= 2024 in Philippine television =

The following is a list of events affecting Philippine television in 2024. Events listed include television show debuts, finales, cancellations, and channel launches, closures and rebrandings, as well as information about controversies and carriage disputes.

== Events ==
=== January ===
- January 1
  - Aniplus Asia and K-Plus have ceased its broadcast in the Philippines by Cignal and SatLite due to the termination of agreement between Omnicontent Management, Inc. (the exclusive Philippine pay TV distributor) and Plus Media Networks, Pte. Ltd. as they failed to agree on the terms and conditions for the renewal of its channel carriage.
  - Broadcast Enterprises and Affiliated Media terminated Advanced Media Broadcasting System's All TV on BEAM TV's digital subchannel line-up via Channel 31 due to the expiration of its licensing agreement with the network. Meanwhile, the network continued to air on VHF Channel 2 (analog) and UHF channel 16 (digital), Cignal, G Sat, Sky Cable and other cable and satellite providers, while BEAM TV launched Blast Sports on their digital subchannel line-up on January 17.
  - Cignal terminated three channels: MTV 90s, MTV Live and Outdoor Channel on its line-up due to the expiration of Cignal's contract with the said networks. Meanwhile, MTV 90s, MTV Live and Outdoor Channel continued to air on Cablelink, Sky Cable (until April 16) and other cable and satellite providers, until the closure of the said MTV channels on December 31, 2025.
  - G Sat terminated six channels owned by Warner Bros. Discovery Asia-Pacific: Cartoon Network, Cartoonito, Cinemax, CNN International, HBO and Warner TV as they failed to agree on the terms and conditions for the renewal of its channel carriage; however, they are set to return on April 3. Meanwhile, Cartoon Network, Cartoonito, CNN International, Cinemax, HBO and WarnerTV continued to air via Cignal, Cablelink, Sky Cable and other cable and satellite providers.
- January 2 – Cignal terminated Telenovela Channel on its line-up due to the expiration of their contract with the said network. Meanwhile, the channel continued to air on Sky Cable and other cable and satellite providers until its closure on March 1.
- January 5 – The lawyers of TVJ Productions were served the December 22, 2023 decision of the Marikina City Regional Trial Court Branch 273, ordered GMA Network and TAPE Inc. to stop infringing upon the trademarks to the variety show, Eat Bulaga!. The decision resolved a copyright infringement and unfair competition complaint filed against TAPE and GMA, which continued to use the title even after the original hosts Tito Sotto, Vic Sotto, and Joey de Leon and other hosts left the show on May 31, 2023. This development paved the way for TVJ Productions to resume the use of the title and drop the interim title E.A.T. on January 6. On the same day, GMA Network and TAPE Inc. debuted their new noontime show Tahanang Pinakamasaya.
- January 6
  - After 62 years, ABS-CBN Entertainment formally renamed to ABS-CBN Studios that began to use their opening billboard (OBB) on respective programs. On April 6, they used the new simplified OBB since It's Showtime.
  - Rated Korina (formerly known as Rated K) celebrated its 1,000th episode on Philippine television.
- January 15 - After 22 years, GMA Network's primetime evening block "GMA Telebabad" formally renamed to "GMA Prime" in conjunction with the back-to-back premiere of Love. Die. Repeat. and Asawa ng Asawa Ko on its respective time slots.
- January 18 - i-Witness celebrated its 25th anniversary of the longest-running documentary program on Philippine television since it premiered in 1999.
- January 20 - Lance Aceron of Quezon City proclaimed as first ever Mr. Cutie: Boys Got Talent Grand Winner on Eat Bulaga!.
- January 22
  - One Sports has switched its airing of aspect ratio format quality on the channel feed and its programming to widescreen format (16:9) that converted its mitigation of reception through channel 41 (digital), cable and satellite providers at exactly 8:00 a.m. after 23 years on the usage of broadcast video picture resolution that migrated from fullscreen format (4:3). On March 15, the channel and RPTV (owned and operated by TV5 Network, Inc. and Nine Media Corporation, together with Radio Philippines Network) launched their respective high-definition simulcast feeds on Cignal TV.
  - Most of SMNI's free TV and radio broadcasting operations from Sonshine Media Network International including channels 39 and 43 and Sonshine Radio 1026 AM KHz in Mega Manila signed off the air due to the indefinite suspension of the National Telecommunications Commission, citing the network's failure to comply with an earlier order, SMNI continues to broadcast of pay television channels in 24 Hours a Day, 7 Days a Week, together with 600 Cable TV Operators across the Philippines.
- January 23 – The Government of the Philippines (Presidential Communications Operations Office) through the subchannel of People's Television Network launched Congress TV on channel 14 (digital) replacing RTVMalacañang, and on channel 17 (digital), on October 1.
- January 27 - Rea Gen Villareal of Caloocan City proclaimed as the Year 7 Grand Champion on Tawag ng Tanghalan on It's Showtime.
- January 28 – The Government of the Philippines, under the Marcos administration, officially launched the Bagong Pilipinas Digibox during the Bagong Pilipinas kick-off rally. Coinciding with the launch, the government urged Filipinos to switched to digital terrestrial television as the transition period is now moving ahead.
- January 31
  - After 9 years of broadcast, CNN Philippines (VHF 9) ended its commercial operations on dawn of Saturday until it signed off completely on January 30 & 31. as Nine Media Corporation and CNN decided not to renew their license agreement due to financial losses as well as poor ratings of the network and loss of advertisers' support. On February 1, Radio Philippines Network rebranded to RPTV, jointly owned and operated by TV5 Network that featured programs from TV5 and One Sports. Pursuant to airtime lease agreement between MediaQuest Holdings, Cignal TV and Radio Philippines Network, RPTV became the new official broadcaster of the local and international sports coverage. A2Z continued to provide the Philippine Basketball Association until Finals Game 5 of the Commissioner's Cup on February 11 when they canceled and removed from the schedule after 3 months of broadcast that previously assigned by TV5 Network on October 17, 2023.
  - Solar Learning terminated on Cablelink and other cable and satellite providers due to pull-out from the satellite broadcast dish provider's line-up. Meanwhile, the network continued to air on digital terrestrial broadcast via Southern Broadcasting Network through their subchannel lineup.

=== February ===
- February 1
  - Radio Philippines Network has switched its airing of aspect ratio format quality on the channel feed and its programming to widescreen format (16:9) as being converted its mitigation of reception through analog and digital signal reception through free TV and other cable and satellite providers after more than 54 years on the usage of broadcast video picture resolution that migrated from fullscreen format (4:3).
  - TV5 Network terminated One PH on their digital subchannel line-up via Channel 18 after three years and 8 months and was replaced by RPTV. Meanwhile, the channel continued to air on Cignal, Cignal Play and SatLite. However, the channel returned to digital free-TV in 2026 with a test broadcast on channel 51.
- February 4 - As part of their 29th anniversary, ABS-CBN's noontime musical variety show ASAP Natin 'To resumed their studio audience after almost 4 years on behind closed door productions due to the COVID-19 pandemic in the Philippines in 2020. Alongside with its audience return, the show retained the title ASAP alone again on September 1, as well as updated its new logo and on-air graphics.
- February 10 - Christian Era Broadcasting Service International, the religious broadcast media arm of the Iglesia ni Cristo, celebrated its 55th anniversary of religious broadcasting on radio and 41st year in television.
- February 14 - TV Patrol Weekend celebrated its 20th anniversary on Philippine television.
- February 15
  - Cablelink launched seven channels owned by Creative Programs, Inc. (a subsidiary of ABS-CBN Corporation) on their line-up: ANC, Cinema One, Cine Mo!, Jeepney TV, Metro Channel, Myx and TeleRadyo Serbisyo.
  - Converge Vision launched ANC and TeleRadyo Serbisyo on their line-up owned by Creative Programs, Inc. (a subsidiary of ABS-CBN Corporation).
  - G Sat terminated three channels: Fox News and Paramount Network on its line-up due to the expiration of G Sat's contract with the said networks while Daystar TV on its line up due to pull-out from the satellite broadcast dish provider's line-up. Meanwhile, Fox News continued to air on Cignal, Sky Cable (until August 1) and other cable providers via distributor Omnicontent Management while Paramount Network continued to air on Cignal until its closure on April 1. In addition, G Sat launched three channels on their line-up: ANC, RJ DigiTV, and TeleRadyo Serbisyo.
- February 18
  - One PH celebrated its 5th anniversary of broadcasting on cable television.
  - One Balita Pilipinas celebrated its 5th anniversary on Philippine television.
- February 22
  - Blast TV launched Setanta Sports on their linear channel line-up.
  - Sky Cable continued its cable television service after Lopez Holdings Corporation (ABS-CBN Corporation) and PLDT's Beneficial Trust Fund (MediaQuest Holdings) decided not to push through with the sale of Sky Cable. It was previously announced for a shutdown on February 27 at 12:00 m.n. after 32 years and a month, following its transition into internet service provider due to the PLDT-SKY acquisition deal, which disclosed by the Philippine Competition Commission and allowed the transaction to proceed on January 22.
- February 25 -
  - Kapuso Mo, Jessica Soho celebrated its 1,000th episode on Philippine television.
  - Tutok 13 celebrated its 5th anniversary on Philippine television.

=== March ===
- March 1
  - After 12 years and 5 months of its broadcasting, Telenovela Channel has ceased broadcast by Beginnings at Twenty Plus, Inc. due to permanent discontinuation of its telecast by the content provider.
  - After 32 years and a month, Chinese Entertainment Channel has ceased broadcast by Sky Cable due to permanent discontinuation of its telecast by the content provider.
- March 5 - After over 20 years, Pampanga-based local/regional cable TV channel PEP TV has ceased broadcast by Reliance Broadcasting Unlimited (an affiliate of Converge ICT) due to financial difficulties.
- March 8 - Weekday noontime programming on GMA Network reverted to its direct control after the abrupt end of the blocktime agreement with TAPE Inc. that lasted for 29 years and two months. This came on the heels of the sudden conclusion of TAPE's Tahanang Pinakamasaya because of its failure to pay GMA a ₱57 million in blocktime fees over a period of eight months, coinciding with the departure of the original hosts of Eat Bulaga! from their partnership with the Jalosjos-owned production company.
- March 15 - 24 Oras celebrated its 20 years of Philippine television.
- March 20
  - ABS-CBN Studios and GMA Network, Inc. extended their collaboration to air the noontime variety show, It's Showtime on its main channel and Kapuso Stream on April 6.
  - Sky Cable terminated Shop TV on its line-up due to the expiration of Sky Cable's contract with the said network. Meanwhile, the network continued to air on digital free TV Channel 21 via digital subchannel and other cable and satellite providers until its closure on July 12, 2026.
- March 25–27 - Eat Bulaga! aired its annual "Lenten Drama Specials" for the first time since 2019, as part of the festivities for its 45th anniversary. This edition resumed production following the COVID-19 pandemic in the Philippines, which caused a hiatus in 2020. Notably, it marked their debut on TV5 and was produced by TVJ Productions. Furthermore, it was the first time the special program aired via simulcast on RPTV, since their final airing on Radio Philippines Network in 1988.
- March 28–30
  - TeleRadyo Serbisyo, including its radio counterpart (both owned by owned by Baycomms Broadcasting Corporation and operated by Media Serbisyo Production Corporation, a joint venture between Prime Media Holdings (through subsidiary Philippine Collective Media Corporation) and ABS-CBN Corporation) went off-air for the first time after 4 years since the English-language ABS-CBN News Channel along with simultaneous telecast of ABS-CBN-owned TeleRadyo aired the Holy Week special programming every Easter Triduum from 2020 to 2023.
  - The Healing Eucharist aired its special liturgical masses during the Paschal Triduum for this year. The Holy Week Masses taped at the ABS-CBN Chapel of the Annunciation, instead from the normal studio used in the past years, and it was broadcast simultaneously for three days on cable TV via Kapamilya Channel and Metro Channel, online via Kapamilya Online Live, The Healing Eucharist Facebook page and YouTube channel and iWantTFC, and on free-to-air via A2Z (where the network has a right of first refusal to carry as part of a programming agreement with ABS-CBN Corporation along with SVD-Mission Communications Foundation's Seven Last Words, due to the Jesus Is Lord Church Worldwide's ownership).
- March 29
  - SVD-Mission Communications Foundation's Seven Last Words officially resumed its live broadcast with live audiences after 2 years of pre-recorded due to the COVID-19 pandemic in the Philippines and the shutdown of ABS-CBN broadcasting in 2020, and was broadcast simultaneously on cable TV via Kapamilya Channel and Metro Channel, online via iWantTFC, and on free-to-air via A2Z (MCFI's director Fr. Bel San Luis later acknowledged Jesus is Lord Church Worldwide and ZOE Broadcasting Network founder Eddie Villanueva during the special program's closing message, as the church's channel ownership also refused to carry Catholic liturgical masses during the Paschal Triduum due to their programming agreement with ABS-CBN Corporation).
  - The Dominican Fathers of the Philippines' Siete Palabras had its live broadcast with live audiences held at the Santo Domingo Church in Quezon City and other locations affiliated with the Dominican Fathers throughout Luzon (including the University of Santo Tomas in Manila and the Minor Basilica of Our Lady of the Rosary of Manaoag in Manaoag, Pangasinan), and was broadcast on television via GMA Network (selected GMA Regional TV stations in Visayas and Mindanao were pre-empted and replaced with their own local versions) for the 16th year and on radio via Radyo Veritas in Metro Manila as well as other Catholic Media Network affiliated stations nationwide.

=== April ===
- April 1
  - Three beIN Sports linear channels have ceased broadcast in the Philippines on G Sat and Sky Cable due to the planned restructuring content of beIN Media Group as part of the company's continuing efforts focusing on its streaming services through beIN Sports Connect in the region. Until September 1, 2026 Cignal returned on Three beIN Sports linear channel.
  - MediaQuest Holdings, through TV5 Network, Inc. launched a livestreaming of exclusive and recapping episodes for old, new and well-loved shows of TV5 on their digital and online platforms like Facebook and YouTube, Kapatid Online.
  - After three years and one month, Paramount Network Asia has ceased broadcast across Southeast Asia (including the Philippines) due to the planned restructuring content of Paramount Networks EMEAA (a unit of Paramount International Networks owned by Paramount Global) as part of the upcoming launch of their own streaming services in the region through both Paramount+ and Pluto TV (in the Philippines, however for Paramount+ launched as a content hub on TAP DMV's own streaming service Blast TV instead).
- April 3 - G Sat returned six channels owned by Warner Bros. Discovery Asia-Pacific on their line-up: Cartoon Network, Cartoonito, Cinemax Asia, CNN International, HBO and WarnerTV after three months-long termination also due to the provider's expired contract. In addition, G Sat launched TAP DMV's Premier Sports 2 on their line-up in high-definition while Fox News returned its broadcast on their line-up with a new channel assignment after a month of halt broadcast on its provider.
- April 5 - Cignal terminated two channels on their line-up: CinemaWorld and Gem on its line-up due to the expiration of Cignal's contract with the said networks. Meanwhile, CinemaWorld continued to air on Cablelink, Sky Cable and other cable providers via distributor Omnicontent Management while Gem continued to air on Sky Cable and other cable and satellite providers via distributor Asian Cable Communications until its closure on August 1.
- April 15 - All TV began its simulcast of Jeepney TV programs under Jeepney TV sa All TV and Kapamilya Channel broadcast feed to be known as Kapamilya Channel sa All TV (later ABS-CBN sa ALLTV2 from March 16, 2026) for the former and current ABS-CBN programs, respectively, marking the return of ABS-CBN to Channels 2 and 16 in Mega Manila and regional stations after 4 years since the shutdown of its former network on May 5, 2020, pursuant to the content (later brand licensing from December 17, 2025) agreement between ABS-CBN Corporation and Advanced Media Broadcasting System. As such, commercial breaks of current programs used the 2020–2026 Kapamilya Channel silent break bumper from April 15, 2024 to January 1, 2026 (with the bumper itself was used from June 13, 2020 to March 16, 2026).
- April 16 - Sky Cable terminated 13 channels on their line-up: ABP News, Da Vinci Kids, Fashion TV, Good Times, NDTV India, Outdoor Channel, Star Bharat, Star Gold, Star Plus, Zee Anmol, Zee Cinema, Zee Punjabi and Zee TV on its line-up. Meanwhile, ABP News, Star Bharat, Star Gold and Star Plus continued to air on Cablelink, while Da Vinci Kids continued to air on G Sat, and Fashion TV continued to air on Cignal and streamed on iWantTFC.
- April 20 - Kim Hewitt of Dumaguete City, Negros Oriental emerged as the second season grand champion of Tawag ng Tanghalan Kids on It's Showtime.
- April 23–30 - For the very first time, GMA Network made a collaboration through its two departments for a crossover: Abot-Kamay na Pangarap with Jillian Ward (GMA Entertainment Group) and Black Rider with Ruru Madrid (GMA Public Affairs).

=== May ===
- May 1 - MediaQuest Holdings, through TV5 Network, Inc. launched 92.3 Radyo5 True FM's "TeleRadyo" channel on Cignal TV, True TV on a test broadcast with its official launch commenced on November 4 coinciding the transfer of True FM's operations from NBC's 92.3 FM to Bright Star's 105.9 FM after the former was acquired by Philippine Collective Media Corporation and rebranded as Favorite Music Radio on the same day.
- May 12 - The Creamline Cool Smashers clinched the 2024 Premier Volleyball League All-Filipino Conference championship title after defeated Choco Mucho Flying Titans 3–2 in a best-of-three game series at the Araneta Coliseum in Cubao, Quezon City.
- May 13 - After its soft launch on September 13, 2022, Advanced Media Broadcasting System's All TV made its official launch.
- May 15 - The NU Bulldogs and NU Lady Bulldogs clinched the UAAP Season 86 men's and women's volleyball championship title after defeated the UST Growling Tigers and Tigresses 2–0 in the best-of-three game series at the SM Mall of Asia Arena in Bay City, Pasay.
- May 19 - Jillian Pamat of Dangcagan, Bukidnon (coached by Bamboo Mañalac) proclaimed as the third season grand champion of The Voice Teens. It also marked its final season and edition of The Voice franchise on its 11-year relationship with ABS-CBN Corporation after producing 10 seasons (including regular edition ended on March 1, 2013, the kids edition ended on May 21, 2023 and the teens edition ended on May 19) as the Philippine reality singing competition was taken over by GMA Network on August 27, 2023, including the social media pages.
- May 26
  - The Perpetual Altas clinched the NCAA Season 98 men's volleyball championship title after defeating the EAC Generals 2–0 in a best-of-three-game series at the Filoil EcoOil Centre in San Juan, Metro Manila. This was fourth consecutive title.
  - The Benilde Lady Blazers clinched the NCAA Season 98 women's volleyball championship title after defeating the Letran Lady Knights 2–0 in a best-of-three-game series at the Filoil EcoOil Centre in San Juan, Metro Manila. This was third consecutive title.
- May 27 - Philippine Collective Media Corporation, in collaboration with several other content providers including ABS-CBN Corporation (where PCMC's owner Martin Romualdez, who is Leyte 1st District Representative and House Majority Floor Leader, voted one of the 70 representatives to reject the network's renewal broadcast franchise on July 10, 2020) launched a national television network, Prime TV, that also marked the return of TeleRadyo Serbisyo to digital free-to-air television, almost 2 years after ZOE Broadcasting Network terminated TeleRadyo on ZOE TV's digital subchannel line-up via Channel 20 as the licensing agreement expired on November 1, 2022.

=== June ===
- June 1 - Jesus the Healer celebrated its 35th anniversary on Philippine television.
- June 4 - Living Asia Channel celebrated its 20th anniversary of broadcasting.
- June 14 - MC Mateo proclaimed as the Tanghalan ng Kampeon Grand Champion on TiktoClock.
- June 16 - The Meralco Bolts proclaimed as the 2024 PBA Philippine Cup champions after defeating the San Miguel Beermen 4–2 in a best-of-seven game series. This was their first title achieved by the said team in the history of the Philippine Basketball Association since they joined the said league in 2010.
- June 28 - GMA Network unveiled a new station ID featuring a revised version of the 2002 logo with a new slogan "Isa sa Puso ng Pilipino" (lit. "One of the Heart of Filipino"). This latest station ID is seen during the network's sign-on and sign-off activity and the shortened version aired during commercial breaks and without Mike Enriquez after his death on August 29, 2023.

=== July ===
- July 1
  - two ABS-CBN/CPI/ZOE linear channels (A2Z and Kapamilya Channel) have switched its airing of aspect ratio format quality on the standard definition feed and its programming to widescreen format (16:9) as being converted its mitigation of reception through VHF channel 11 (analog) and UHF channel 20 (digital) (for A2Z), Sky Cable, Cignal and other cable and satellite providers, iWantTFC, TFC, and other digital platforms (for Kapamilya Channel) after 26 years and two months (for A2Z) and after 4 years (for Kapamilya Channel) as the move officially phased out the 4:3 aspect ratio used by ABS-CBN for almost 71 years since the Philippine television established on October 23, 1953, and almost 9 years after ABS-CBN HD launched on October 3, 2015 and 6 years and two months after ABS-CBN News and Current Affairs programs officially transitioned to full high definition on April 2, 2018.
  - Several journalists of CNN Philippines jointly launched a revival of RPN's flagship newscast NewsWatch via digital multicasting news service on YouTube, NewsWatch Plus.
- July 3 - The Government of the Philippines (Presidential Communications Group) through the subchannel of Intercontinental Broadcasting Corporation launched DWAN-AM's "TeleRadyo" Channel, DWAN-TV on channel 17 (digital).
- July 7 - The 60th edition of Binibining Pilipinas took place at the Smart Araneta Coliseum in Cubao, Quezon City, Metro Manila. ABS-CBN Corporation and PLDT's Beneficial Trust Fund (MediaQuest Holdings through TV5 Network, Inc. and Cignal TV) awarded the local rights to the annual pageant that aired on both A2Z, Kapamilya Channel, Metro Channel, TV5, iWantTFC and Binibining Pilipinas Facebook and YouTube. It marked the fourteenth overall year with ABS-CBN, which began with Binibining Pilipinas 1995 and 2nd year on TV5, which also began with Binibining Pilipinas 2022 on July 31, 2022. At the end of the event, Angelica Lopez crowned Myrna Esguerra of Abra as Binibining Pilipinas International 2024, 60 years since Myrna Panlilio was also crowned as the first Binibining Pilipinas 1964 as the first edition on July 5, 1964.
- July 12 - Ito Ang Balita celebrated its 20th anniversary on Philippine television aired on UNTV before temporarily leaving the air in 2005 and was reinstated on September 3, 2007.
- July 15 - Financial news website, Bilyonaryo, launched its own business news channel — Bilyonaryo News Channel. The official broadcast commenced on September 9.
- July 16 - Cignal TV made some changes to its channel space assignment. Kapamilya Channel HD transferred from channel 23 to channel 257 and Aliw 23 transferred from channel 24 to channel 23, following their partnership agreement with Aliw Broadcasting Corporation on July 12.
- July 26 – August 11 – The 2024 Summer Olympics took place in Paris, France. On June 10, MediaQuest Holdings (Cignal TV, Radio Philippines Network and TV5 Network, Inc.) and their sister companies PLDT–Smart Communications awarded the local rights to the annual games as part of a deal with the Philippine Olympic Committee that aired games on TV5 (selected games aired from July 31 to August 6 only), One Sports, One Sports+, RPTV, Cignal Play, Smart Livestream and Pilipinas Live. It also aired on pay-per-view through Cignal and SatLite. This marked both as the seventh overall consecutive games of TV5/Cignal and fourth consecutive summer games of MediaQuest that introduced for the 2012 Summer Olympic Games co-shared with Solar Entertainment Corporation. It also served as the official historic Olympics return on the Radio Philippines Network since their last broadcast of the 2008 Summer Olympics and marked centennial for the Philippines at the Olympics since they joined the Summer Olympic Games in 1924.
- July 27 – After 19 years and a month of its broadcast programming run, Asenso KaPinoy aired its final episode as the original host, Francis Cardona, died last April 28, making it the longest-running infotainment on Philippine television.
- July 29 - Net 25 aired the first Tagalog-dubbed Vietnamese drama on Philippine television: Strict ang Mommy Ko, also known by its original title Mẹ ác ma, cha thiên sứ (Devil Mother, Angel Father).
- July 30 - The longest-running noontime variety show in the Philippines, Eat Bulaga!, celebrated its 45th anniversary with the subtitle “5 Years to 5 Decades.” It also marked the official five-year countdown to Eat Bulaga!’s upcoming 50th anniversary in 2029.

=== August ===
- August 1
  - After 4 years and 4 months, Gem has ceased broadcast by KC Global Media across Southeast Asia (including the Philippines via distributor Asian Cable Communications) due to low demand on Japanese contents as they shift the focus on their sister channels, including Animax.
  - Sandro Muhlach filed an administrative complaint with GMA Network's management against Richard Dode Cruz, GMA head writer and GMA content creator and creative consultant Jojo Tawasil Nones. The case anchored on sexual abuse after the GMA Gala 2024 that was held on July 20 inside the Manila Marriott Hotel suite, where Sandro got intoxicated and eventually led by the suspects to a room. Because of Sandro's requested confidentiality, the Network said it only published the details after conclusion of the investigation. Pending the inquiry, Nones was removed as the 2nd Unit Director of then-upcoming drama series, Prinsesa ng City Jail (2025). Earlier, Muhlach, Diane Abby Tupaz and Angela Kristine, in Facebook cryptic statements accused the suspects and demanded justice for Sandro. Nones and Cruz's lawyer, Maggie Abraham-Garduque, released a public appeal to honor the ongoing probe and desist from publishing defamatory remarks.
  - Sky Cable terminated Fox News on its line-up due to the expiration of Sky Cable's contract with the said network. Meanwhile, the channel continued to air on Cignal, G Sat and other cable and satellite providers.
- August 21 - Aliw Broadcasting Corporation launched DWIZ-AM's "TeleRadyo" Channel, DWIZ News TV, through the subchannel of Aliw Channel 23 on channel 23 (digital) after the latter began to broadcast current affairs from NewsWatch Plus and sports programming.

=== September ===
- September 1
  - Jungo TV Pinoy, ScreamFlix and Toro TV have ceased broadcast of three channels by Jungo TV (via distributor Solar Entertainment Corporation) due to permanent termination of their channel worldwide. On September 20, Front Row Channel has ceased broadcast after four years and five months of broadcast with the same latter's termination.
  - Rock MNL celebrated its 5th anniversary of broadcasting.
  - Sky Cable terminated two channels on their line-up: DreamWorks Channel and NHK World Premium on its line-up due to the expiration of Sky Cable's contract with the said network. Meanwhile, DreamWorks Channel continued to air on Cignal and G Sat, while NHK World Premium continued to air on Cablelink and other cable and satellite providers.
- September 4 - The Creamline Cool Smashers clinched the 2024 Premier Volleyball League Reinforced Conference title after defeating the Akari Chargers 3–0 at the PhilSports Arena in Pasig. On September 12, the said team also clinched the 2024 Premier Volleyball League Invitational Conference title, including their first grand slam title after defeating the Cignal HD Spikers 3–2 at the Araneta Coliseum in Cubao, Quezon City. This is also their 10th overall championship title for a year, a season and three conferences in the Premier Volleyball League history since it established in 2004 as the inter-collegiate Shakey's V-League.
- September 7 - For the second time in the Philippine sports history since March 26, 2022, the National Collegiate Athletic Association and the University Athletic Association of the Philippines simultaneously began their respective seasons. The NCAA Season 100 held their opening ceremony at the SM Mall of Asia Arena in Bay City, Pasay and also marked as centennial season since it established in 1924, while the UAAP Season 87 held their opening ceremony at the Araneta Coliseum in Cubao, Quezon City.
- September 20 - Hallypop and Pinoy Hits ended its commercial operations by GMA Network on free-to-air television due to low ratings, programming redundancies, lack of advertising support and cross-cutting measures as well as the latter's contract with Jungo TV expired on September 9.
- September 30 - ABS-CBN launches its Kapamilya, Deal or No Deal YouTube channel with episodes hosted by Luis Manzano being uploaded on weekdays until January 30, 2026, with simulcasts on Facebook, All TV and A2Z. It was later confirmed by ABS-CBN on July 29, 2025 that the show would be returning after a ten-year hiatus with its sixth season premiere slated to air on April 25, 2026.

=== October ===
- October 1
  - All pay television operators and providers in the Philippines have added or terminated a number of various channels and networks on their respective listing line-ups.
  - Cablelink terminated NBA TV Philippines on its line-up due to the expiration of Cablelink's contract with the said network. Meanwhile, the network continued to air on Cignal, SatLite and other cable and satellite providers.
- October 1 – 26 - ABS-CBN's longest-running noontime variety show It's Showtime, celebrating its 15th year in Philippine television dubbed as "KinsEYYY" with Magpasikat 2024: KinsEYYY! took place from October 21 to 26.
- October 7 - Solar Sports marked its return to free-to-air television through channel 21 (digital), thus resuming its free-to-air broadcast after 2 years, this time as a non-encrypted channel.
- October 11 - ANC Headlines celebrated its 25th anniversary on Philippine television.
- October 15
  - Radio Philippines Network celebrated its 55th anniversary of broadcasting as a television network.
  - Radyo Bandido TV celebrated its 5th anniversary of broadcasting.
- October 26
  - Team Ogie, Kim, MC and Lassy was hailed as the 15th anniversary grand champion (Magpasikat 2024: KinsEYYY) on It's Showtime.
  - Fyang Smith of Mandaluyong proclaimed as the Big Winner of Pinoy Big Brother: Gen 11.

=== November ===
- November 4 - Digital 8, Inc. launched D8TV on BEAM TV's digital subchannel thru timesharing with Pilipinas HD.
- November 6 - Blast TV launched tvN Asia on their linear channel line-up.
- November 7 - Kapuso Mo, Jessica Soho celebrated its 20th anniversary on Philippine television.
- November 8 - TNT Tropang Giga clinched the 2024 PBA Governors' Cup title after defeating Barangay Ginebra San Miguel 95–85 in the finals best-of-seven series at the Araneta Coliseum in Cubao, Quezon City.
- November 18 - The Government of the Philippines (Presidential Communications Group) through the subchannel of People's Television Network launched a sports-oriented channel, PTV Sports Network, on channel 14 (digital). On the same day, Congress TV terminated on channel 14 (digital) and was replaced by the mirror feed of PTV. Meanwhile, the network continued to air on channel 17 (digital) and Converge Vision.
- November 19 - Warner Bros. Discovery Asia-Pacific rebranded the HBO Go service as Max in the Southeast Asian region, including the Philippines.
- November 22 - Tala Gatchalian proclaimed as the Tanghalan ng Kampeon Season 2 Grand Champion on TiktoClock.
- November 23 - KZ Tandingan's look-alike (Vyan Dela Cruz of La Union) proclaimed as the Ultimate Kalokalike: Face 4 Grand Winner on It's Showtime.
- November 25 - Sky Cable terminated Warner TV and HLN on its line-up due to the expiration of Sky Cable's contract with the said networks. Meanwhile, Warner TV continued to air on Cablelink, Cignal, G Sat and other cable and satellite providers, while HLN continued to air on other cable and satellite providers.

=== December ===
- December 1 - The NU Pep Squad clinched the UAAP Season 87 cheerdance competition title and tied with UST Salinggawi Dance Troupe and UP Varsity Pep Squad as winningest squad in UAAP cheerdance history.
- December 3 - GMA Network and FPJ Productions sealed a content partnership to license the films of the late Fernando Poe Jr. on the main network that marked the return of FPJ sa GMA for the 2nd incarnation on March 2, 2025 after 30 years since the movie block aired from May 3, 1986 to March 25, 1995 before it moved to ABS-CBN Corporation under the movie block FPJ: Da King on ABS-CBN (formerly FPJ Action Cinema and Cinema FPJ: Da King on ABS-CBN) from October 22, 2001 to May 2, 2003, the second again from 2007 to 2010 and third again from September 8, 2013 to January 12, 2014 and fourth again on November 11, 2018 under Ang Hari: FPJ on ABS-CBN. It continued to air under FPJ: Da King on Kapamilya Channel, A2Z and TV5 until December 31, 2023. The movie block previously aired on Studio 23/S+A (now Aliw 23) as FPJ: Hari ng Pelikula in 2013, second again FPJ: Ang Nag-Iisang Alamat until January 12, 2014 and third again as FPJ: Kampeon ng Aksyon from January 24, 2014 to January 27, 2017 and Jeepney TV as FPJ: Da King Magpakailanman from August 30, 2013 to March 23, 2017. Meanwhile, Cine Mo! continued until February 25 as FPJ: Hari ng Aksyon, while Cinema One continued on a respective timeslots.
- December 6 - Unang Hirit celebrated its 25th anniversary as the longest-running morning news broadcasting and talk show on Philippine television since it premiered in 1999.
- December 7
  - The Mapúa Cardinals clinched the NCAA Season 100 basketball title after defeating the Benilde Blazers 2–0 in a best-of-three game series held at the Araneta Coliseum in Cubao, Quezon City. This was their 6th basketball championship title in 33 years since they last won in 1991.
  - The Pampanga Giant Lanterns proclaimed as the 2024 MPBL season champions after defeating the Quezon Huskers 3–0 in a best-of-five finals series and also the first team to win back-to-back championships in MPBL history.
- December 11 – Former Tawag ng Tanghalan finalist Sofronio Vasquez wins the 26th season of The Voice.
- December 14 - Naya Ambi won the sixth season of The Clash.
- December 15
  - The NU Lady Bulldogs clinched the UAAP Season 87 women's basketball title after defeating the UST Growling Tigresses 2–1 in winner take-all game 3 of the best-of-three finals series held at the Araneta Coliseum in Cubao, Quezon City. This was their 8th basketball championship title in 2 years since they last won in 2022.
  - The UP Fighting Maroons clinched the UAAP Season 87 men's basketball title after defeating De La Salle Green Archers 2–1 in winner take-all game 3 of the best-of-three finals series held at the Araneta Coliseum in Cubao, Quezon City. This was their 4th basketball championship title in 4 years since they last won in 2022.
  - Nevin Adam Garceniego of Quezon City (coached by Pablo) proclaimed as the sixth season grand champion of The Voice Kids.
- December 19 - The Government of the Philippines (Presidential Communications Operations Office) and the Philippine Charity Sweepstakes Office announced a groundbreaking partnership to air the TV broadcast of PCSO Lottery Draw on December 31 via free-to-air network D8TV, Intercontinental Broadcasting Corporation, its sister station DWAN 1206 AM (both radio and social media) and online livestreaming via IBC's YouTube channel that also marked the end of its 30-year relationship with People's Television Network.

== Debuts ==
=== Major networks ===
==== A2Z ====
The following are programs that debuted on A2Z:

- January 1: Fractured
- January 15: Superbook Reimagined (season 4) and Zoomers (season 1)
- January 22: Linlang: The Teleserye Version
- February 17: The Voice Teens (season 3)
- February 18: Sunday Blockbusters
- April 22: Monarch
- May 13: High Street
- May 25: What's Wrong with Secretary Kim (Philippine adaptation)
- June 3: Superbook Reimagined (season 5)
- June 17: Pamilya Sagrado
- July 1: Goin' Bulilit (season 9), TV Patrol Express and Zoomers (season 2)
- July 15: Star Hunt: The Audition Show
- July 20: Pinoy Big Brother: Gen 11 and Rainbow Rumble (season 1)
- September 2: Lavender Fields
- October 6: Kuan on One (seasons 1 and 2)
- October 28: The Untamed
- November 2: Mega Blockbusters (A2Z Zinema)
- November 18: Taxi Driver
- December 9: Pinoy Big Brother: Gen 11 Big 4 Ever

===== Re-runs =====
- January 6: Click, Like, Share (seasons 2 and 3)
- January 27: Come and Hug Me
- January 29: Dirty Linen and Mars Ravelo's Darna (2022)
- February 5: F4 Thailand: Boys Over Flowers
- May 4: Count Your Lucky Stars
- May 27: 2gether: The Series^{4}
- July 21: Tara, G!
- July 29: The Killer Bride^{1} and Walang Hanggang Paalam
- August 10: Still 2gether^{4}
- September 14: The Forbidden Flower
- September 30: Kapamilya, Deal or No Deal (season 5)^{1}^{4}
- November 16: Super Inggo at ang Super Tropa^{1}^{2} (Kidz Weekend)

Notes
^ ^{a} Originally aired on ABS-CBN (now Kapamilya Channel)
^ ^{b} Originally aired on Jeepney TV
^ ^{c} Originally aired on Hero (now defunct)
^ ^{d} Originally aired on Kapamilya Channel

==== GMA ====
The following are programs that debuted on GMA Network:

- January 1: Kapuso Primetime Cinema (weeknight edition)
- January 6: Tahanang Pinakamasaya
- January 8: Makiling and Romantic Deception
- January 15: Asawa ng Asawa Ko, Love. Die. Repeat. and The Long Ballad
- January 20: Jose & Maria's Bonggang Villa (season 2)
- January 29: Jinxed at First
- February 3: Trolls: TrollsTopia
- February 4: Walang Matigas na Pulis sa Matinik na Misis (season 2)
- February 18: Sunny Bunnies
- February 19: Secret Affair
- February 26: GameKeepers
- March 3: Si Manoy Ang Ninong Ko
- March 4: Lilet Matias: Attorney-at-Law and Miracle of Love
- March 8: Lunchtime Movie Hits
- March 18: Yumi's Cells
- March 25: The Unlisted
- March 31: Recipes of Love
- April 1: Kokdu: Season of Deity and My Guardian Alien
- April 6: Daig Kayo ng Lola Ko (season 3) and It's Showtime
- April 13: DreamWorks Dragons: Rescue Riders and Kung Fu Panda: The Paws of Destiny
- April 15: Rewriting Destiny
- April 22: Third Rail
- May 6: Eclipse of the Heart
- May 11: Running Man Philippines (season 2)
- May 12: My Mother, My Story
- May 13: Spy × Family (season 1) and To the Moon and Back
- May 27: Queen of the Ring and Shooting Stars
- June 1: Daig Kayo ng Lola Ko (season 4)
- June 10: Dr. Tang and Superhero Academy
- June 22: Yashahime
- July 1: Widows' War
- July 11: Parallel World
- July 22: Curtain Call and Tokyo Revengers
- July 29: Pulang Araw and The Betrayal
- August 3: Biyahe ni Drew
- August 5: The Girl He Never Noticed
- August 15: Kiss Goblin
- August 26: Doctor Detective
- September 2: The Girl Who Sees Smells
- September 8: Ok Ako
- September 9: Shining Inheritance (Philippine adaptation) and Snow Eagle Lord
- September 14: The Clash (season 6)
- September 15: The Voice Kids (season 6)
- September 16: The Heavenly Idol
- September 21: Maka (season 1)
- September 22: The Amazing Spiez and GMA Sunday Noontime Blockbuster
- October 14: Love at First Night
- October 21: Forever Young
- October 26: Heart World (season 1)
- October 27: Home Base Plus (season 25)
- October 28: Endless Love (Thai version)
- November 4: Stealer: The Treasure Keeper
- November 11: When the Sky Falls
- November 30: Dami Mong Alam, Kuya Kim!
- December 2: Power Rangers: Beast Morphers
- December 14: All New: Jackie Chan Adventures
- December 21: Aliens Ninano and Daig Kayo ng Lola Ko (season 5)
- December 22: Walang Matigas na Pulis sa Matinik na Misis (season 3)

===== Re-runs =====
- February 18: The New Legends of Monkey^{5}
- February 24: Angry Birds Blues^{5}
- May 6: Voltes V: Legacy
- June 2: GameKeepers
- June 15: Piggy Tales^{5}
- August 3: Sesame Street
- September 30: Knockout^{5}^{6}
- October 20: Cardcaptor Sakura: Clear Card^{3}^{4}
- October 27: The Bible^{1}
- November 30: Oggy and the Cockroaches^{1}^{2}^{5}
- December 9: Flames of Vengeance^{5}
- December 21: Karelasyon

Notes
^ ^{a} Originally aired on ABS-CBN (now Kapamilya Channel)
^ ^{b} Originally aired on TV5
^ ^{c} Originally aired on Yey! (now defunct)
^ ^{d} Originally aired on A2Z
^ ^{e} Originally aired on GTV
^ ^{f} Originally aired on TeleAsia Filipino (now defunct)

==== TV5 ====
The following are programs that debuted on TV5:

- January 1: Fractured
- January 6: Eat Bulaga!
- January 7: Sunday Blockbusters
- January 15: Diary of a Prosecutor and Zoomers (season 1)
- January 20: Cine Cinco K-Hits
- January 22: Linlang: The Teleserye Version
- January 27: Cine Cinco: Sabado Hits
- January 29: Cine Cinco Hits
- February 1: Starting Lineup
- February 17: Cine Cinco: Sabado Nights and The Voice Teens (season 3)
- February 21: Wanted sa Radyo
- March 4: Parientes a la fuerza
- March 11: Barangay Singko Panalo
- March 17: Budol Alert
- March 23: Cine Cinco: Weekend Hits
- March 31: American Idol (season 22)
- April 6: Top 5: Mga Kwentong Marc Logan
- April 7: Kapatid Mo, Idol Raffy Tulfo
- April 8: Frontline Express and Lumuhod Ka Sa Lupa
- April 22: Monarch
- April 29: Bluey
- May 13: High Street
- May 18: Gus Abelgas Forensics (season 2)
- May 25: What's Wrong with Secretary Kim (Philippine adaptation)
- June 10: Padyak Princess
- June 17: Catch the Ghost and Pamilya Sagrado
- July 1: Zoomers (season 2)
- July 14: Wil To Win
- July 15: Star Hunt: The Audition Show
- July 20: Fast & Furious Spy Racers, Pinoy Big Brother: Gen 11 and Rainbow Rumble (season 1)
- July 21: Da Pers Family
- September 2: Lavender Fields
- September 22: Julius Babao Unplugged
- September 30: Ang Himala ni Niño and PJ Masks
- October 21: Cine Cinco Kids, Cine Cinco Hollywood, Cine Cinco sa Umaga and Quizmosa
- October 26: Cine Cinco Weekend Saya and Cinco Serye Specials Presents
- October 27: Cine Cinco Astig Sunday
- October 28: The Untamed
- November 2: Cine Cinco Hit na Hit
- November 9: The Second Chance (Thai adaptation)
- November 11: Face to Face: Harapan
- November 18: Taxi Driver
- December 9: Pinoy Big Brother: Gen 11 Big 4 Ever

===== Re-runs =====
- February 5: F4 Thailand: Boys Over Flowers^{6}^{7}
- May 12: The Rain In España
- May 18: Kaya
- May 27: 2gether: The Series^{6}
- July 15: Moonbug Cartoons
  - July 15: Cocomelon, Go Buster and Little Baby Bum
- September 16: Wanted: Ang Serye
- September 28: Jurassic World Camp Cretaceous
- September 30: SpongeBob SquarePants (seasons 1–3)^{1}^{2}^{3}^{4}^{5}
- November 2: Kagat ng Dilim (2020)
- November 11: Stay-In Love

Notes
^ ^{a} Originally aired on ABS-CBN (now Kapamilya Channel)
^ ^{b} Originally aired on Yey! (now defunct)
^ ^{c} Originally aired on Studio 23 (now Aliw 23)
^ ^{d} Originally aired on Q (now GTV)
^ ^{e} Originally aired on RPN (now RPTV)
^ ^{f} Originally aired on Kapamilya Channel
^ ^{g} Originally aired on A2Z

=== State-owned networks ===
==== PTV ====
The following are programs that debuted on People's Television Network:

- January 27: Serbisyo Muna
- March 1: In Person
- March 2: Expertalk (season 3)
- April 27: Health @ Home and Sentro Balita Weekend
- May 5: Eat's Fun
- May 11: Artsy Craftsy
- May 17: Pinoy Pawnstars
- May 20: Unity League
- May 29: Larry Gadon Live
- June 2: RDR Talks
- June 5: Dayaw: Rediscovering Traditions and PTV Balitang Kapampangan
- August 5: Malacañang Insider
- August 8: Young Guns on the Move
- October 5: Expertalk (season 4)
- October 6: Siyensikat (season 5)
- October 21: Balitang Pambansa
- November 3: Lakbay Tugon: Presidential Help Desk
- November 10: Tuklas Yaman
- December 1: Goldenberg: The Concert Series

==== IBC ====
The following are programs that debuted on IBC:

- February 6: Talents Academy (season 14)
- March 9: Dok True Ba? (season 1)
- April 27: Sentro Balita Weekend
- May 15: Handa Sakuna
- May 20: Unity League
- June 8: Ate Rose: Real Life Stories
- July 21: Ang Senado ng Pilipinas
- August 5: Malacañang Insider
- September 20: ResTOURant (season 1)
- September 28: Dok True Ba? (season 2)
- October 21: Balitang Pambansa
- December 31: PCSO Lottery Draw

=== Minor networks ===
The following are programs that debuted on minor networks:

- January 8: All TV News Break on All TV
- January 8: Gracious Revenge on Net 25
- January 14: 3-iN-1 on Net 25
- January 20: May For Ever on Net 25
- February 5: Hataw Balita Ngayon on UNTV
- February 24: Cayetano in Action with Boy Abunda on CLTV 36
- February 26: Usapang TOL on Aliw 23
- March 4: DWIZ Network News and Pasada Balita on Aliw 23
- March 10: Pera-Pera Lang Yan on Aliw 23
- March 30: Benrat, Simba Jr. and the Football World Cup and Speed Racer: The Next Generation on Net 25
- April 1: One Litre of Tears on Net 25
- April 8: Hello, My Shining Love on Net 25
- April 15: TV Patrol on All TV
- April 20: Pamilya Talk with Tita Jing, Proyekto Pilipino and TV Patrol Weekend on All TV
- April 21: Siyasat: DWIZ Investigative Reports on Aliw 23
- May 12: Konnichiwa Manila on All TV
- May 13: Magandang Buhay on All TV
- May 18: Marites University on All TV
- June 9: GoodWill (season 4) on Net 25
- June 15: Motorcycle Republic on Net 25
- June 17: It's Showtime on All TV
- June 28: Net 25 World News on Net 25
- June 29: Sandigan ng Bayan on Aliw 23
- July 1: Goin' Bulilit (season 9) and TV Patrol Express on All TV
- July 22: Oath of Love on Net 25
- July 29: Strict ang Mommy Ko on Net 25
- August 3: Kingdom Force on All TV
- August 12: NewsWatch Now (2nd incarnation), World on a Plate and Zoom In on Aliw 23
- August 13: NewsWatch Plus Conversations on Aliw 23
- August 15: Batas et Al (revived version) on Aliw 23
- August 17: At the Moment with Imee on All TV
- August 20: The Other Office on Aliw 23
- August 21: Manila Conversations on Aliw 23
- September 7: I Love Jesus Street Mission on Light TV
- September 8: Lakbites, Misa Nazareno Sunday Mass, Tastetimony and Trip ni Dre on Aliw 23
- September 8: Basta Enerhiya, Sagot Kita! (season 1) on All TV
- September 23: Love Designer on Net 25
- October 6: Kabuhayan at Negosyo on Aliw 23
- October 13: Wonderful Pinas on UNTV
- October 24: Sagip Bagong Barangay ng Mamamayan in Action on Aliw 23
- November 16: Spotlight on All TV
- November 18: Love Me, Love My Voice on Net 25
- November 24: GoodWill (season 5) on Net 25
- December 9: Life Balance on Aliw 23

==== Re-runs ====
- January 1: If You Wish Upon Me and Why Her? on All TV
- February 26: From Now On, Showtime!, Ngayon at Kailanman (2018)^{1} and Woori the Virgin on All TV
- April 1: Miracle on All TV
- April 15: Bagani^{1}^{6}^{7}, Be My Lady^{1}^{6}^{7}, Habang May Buhay (2010)^{1}, Kadenang Ginto^{1}^{5}^{6}, My Little Juan^{1}, Oh My G!^{1}, Pasion de Amor (2015)^{1}^{3}, Precious Hearts Romances Presents: Lumayo Ka Man sa Akin^{1}, Tubig at Langis^{1}^{5}, Walang Iwanan^{1}^{5} and Wansapanataym^{1}^{5}^{6} on All TV
- April 20: Celebrity Playtime^{1}^{5}, Home Along Da Riles^{1}, Kampanerang Kuba^{1}^{5}, Maalaala Mo Kaya^{1}^{5}^{6}^{7} and Palibhasa Lalake^{1}^{3} on All TV
- April 21: Dahil May Isang Ikaw^{1}, Dahil sa Pag-ibig (2012)^{1}, Ipaglaban Mo!^{1}^{5}^{6}^{7} and Nasaan Ka Nang Kailangan Kita^{1} on All TV
- April 22: Komiks: Da Adventures of Pedro Penduko^{1}^{4}, Krystala^{1}^{5} and Minute to Win It: Last Man Standing (season 2)^{1}^{6}^{7} on All TV
- April 27: Komiks Presents: Wakasan on All TV^{1}
- April 29: Again My Life on All TV
- May 13: Budoy, Forevermore, May Bukas Pa (2009), On the Wings of Love and Pangako sa 'Yo (2015) on All TV^{1}^{5}
- May 18: KBYN: Kaagapay ng Bayan^{6}^{7} and Love in 40 Days^{2}^{5}^{6}^{7} on All TV
- May 19: Paano Kita Mapasasalamatan?^{5}^{6}^{7}, Sana Maulit Muli^{1}^{5} and Viral Scandal^{2}^{5}^{6}^{7} on All TV
- May 27: If You Wish Upon Me on All TV
- June 8: Komiks Presents: Tiny Tony on All TV^{1}^{4}^{5}
- June 10: Komiks: Pedro Penduko at ang Mga Engkantao^{1}^{4} and Langit Lupa^{1}^{5} on All TV
- June 17: Agua Bendita on All TV^{1}^{5}
- July 8: From Now On, Showtime! on All TV
- July 13: Dyesebel (2014) on All TV^{1}^{5}
- July 29: Rubi (2010) on All TV^{1}^{5}
- August 12: Building Bridges, Get Fit, MedTalk Health Talk, One Small Act and The Story of the Filipino on Aliw 23^{8}
- August 19: Why Her? on All TV
- August 24: Kimba the White Lion on Net 25^{9}^{10}
- August 26: Momay on All TV^{1}^{5}
- September 1: Kahit Isang Saglit on All TV^{1}^{5}
- September 7: Volta on All TV^{1}^{5}
- September 9: River Where the Moon Rises on All TV
- September 14: Bagong Umaga^{5}^{6}^{7} and Wako Wako^{1}^{4}^{5} on All TV
- September 30: Kapamilya, Deal or No Deal (season 5)^{1}^{5} and Love Thy Woman^{1}^{5}^{6}^{7} on All TV
- October 13: Hiram on All TV^{1}^{5}
- October 21: Inday Bote^{1}^{5} and Miracle on All TV
- October 28: Magkaribal and Mga Anghel na Walang Langit on All TV^{1}^{5}
- November 4: Woori the Virgin on All TV
- November 9: Nathaniel on All TV^{1}^{5}
- November 18: Nang Ngumiti ang Langit on All TV^{1}^{5}^{6}^{7}
- December 1: Sa Puso Ko, Iingatan Ka on All TV^{1}^{5}
- December 2: Again My Life and The General's Daughter^{1}^{5}^{6} on All TV
- December 9: La Vida Lena on All TV^{2}^{5}^{6}^{7}
- December 14: Lastikman on All TV^{1}^{5}^{6}
- December 28: Ikaw Lamang on All TV^{1}^{5}
- December 30: All of Me^{1}^{5} and Kung Fu Kids^{1}^{4}^{5} on All TV

Notes

1. ^ ^{a} Originally aired on ABS-CBN (now Kapamilya Channel)
2. ^ ^{b} Originally aired on TV5
3. ^ ^{c} Originally aired on Cine Mo!
4. ^ ^{d} Originally aired on Yey! (now defunct)
5. ^ ^{e} Originally aired on Jeepney TV
6. ^ ^{f} Originally aired on Kapamilya Channel
7. ^ ^{g} Originally aired on A2Z
8. ^ ^{h} Originally aired on CNN Philippines (now RPTV)
9. ^ ^{i} Originally aired on Hero (now defunct)
10. ^ ^{j} Originally aired on ABC (now TV5)

=== Other channels ===
The following are programs that debuted on other channels:

- January 1: Lovers & Liars on GTV
- January 1: Fractured on Kapamilya Channel
- January 1: Ted Failon at DJ Chacha sa Radyo5 on One News
- January 1: The Big Story on One PH
- January 1: Kapuso Primetime Cinema (weeknight edition) on Pinoy Hits
- January 6: Eat Bulaga! on CNN Philippines
- January 6: Frontline Pilipinas Weekend on One PH
- January 7: Sunday Blockbusters on Kapamilya Channel
- January 8: Eat Bulaga! on BuKo Channel
- January 8: Makiling on Pinoy Hits
- January 15: Love. Die. Repeat. on GTV
- January 15: Superbook Reimagined (season 4) and Zoomers (season 1) on Kapamilya Channel
- January 15: Afternoon Delight and Storycon on One News
- January 15: Asawa ng Asawa Ko and Love. Die. Repeat. on Pinoy Hits
- January 20: From the Heart Specials: Pumpkin Time on Heart of Asia
- January 20: Jose & Maria's Bonggang Villa (season 2) on Pinoy Hits
- January 22: Linlang: The Teleserye Version on Jeepney TV and Kapamilya Channel
- February 1: Starting Lineup on One Sports and One Sports+
- February 1: BalitaOnenan!, Eat Bulaga!, Frontline Tonight, Gud Morning Kapatid, Starting Lineup, Ted Failon at DJ Chacha sa Radyo5, Wanted sa Radyo and Wow Mali: Doble Tawa on RPTV
- February 3: Chink Positive, Frontline Pilipinas Weekend, Gus Abelgas Forensics (season 1), Hollywood Blockbusters, Masaganang Buhay and Ride PH on RPTV
- February 4: Best 10 Bets on Jeepney TV
- February 4: Walang Matigas na Pulis sa Matinik na Misis (season 2) on Pinoy Hits
- February 5: Ako Bicol Tabang Oro Mismo on Congress TV
- February 11: Negosyo Goals (season 3) on GTV
- February 12: Asawa ng Asawa Ko and Buena Manong Balita (Dobol B TV) on GTV
- February 16: Usapang Budget Natin on Radyo Pilipinas 1 Television
- February 17: Movie Mania and Screams on Screen on Heart of Asia
- February 17: The Voice Teens (season 3) on Kapamilya Channel
- February 18: Bida Asia on Heart of Asia
- March 4: MBC TV Network News on DZRH TV
- March 4: Lilet Matias: Attorney-at-Law on Pinoy Hits
- March 4: Blockbuster Bida on RPTV
- March 4: Radyo 630 Balita on TeleRadyo Serbisyo
- March 9: At the Moment with Imee and Hello Pagkain! on One PH
- March 9: Watcha Morning and Weekend CinePrime on RPTV
- March 9: Yan Tayo on TeleRadyo Serbisyo
- March 10: Sunday Combo Panalo on RPTV
- March 10: Sunny Side Up on TeleRadyo Serbisyo
- March 17: Sunday Mass Live on One Sports
- March 18: MoJo: Mukha ng Balita on One PH
- March 23: Magpakailanman on GTV and Pinoy Hits
- April 1: My Guardian Alien on GTV and Pinoy Hits
- April 4: Hotseat and Jumpball on RPTV
- April 6: Top 5 Mga Kwentong Marc Logan on One PH
- April 6: Daig Kayo ng Lola Ko (season 3) on Pinoy Hits
- April 7: Kapatid Mo, Idol Raffy Tulfo on One PH
- April 8: TiktoClock on GTV
- April 8: Lumuhod Ka Sa Lupa on Sari-Sari Channel
- April 13: Julius Babao Unplugged on One PH
- April 22: Monarch on Kapamilya Channel
- April 23: Tropang K!likasan on Knowledge Channel
- April 23: The Medyo Serious Talk Show on One News
- April 24: Private Time with Ara on One News
- April 29: Banana Actually and The Ordinary Life of Ms. O on Hallypop
- May 1: Bangon Bayan with Mon, Cristy FerMinute, Dr. Love Radio Show, Fastbreak Sports Updates, Frontline Pilipinas, GG: Good Game, H2H: Heart to Heart, Radyo5 News Update, Sana Lourd, Sagot Kita, Sa Totoo Lang, Shoutout, Ted Failon at DJ Chacha sa Radyo5 and Wanted sa Radyo on True FM TV (now True TV)
- May 4: Alagang Kapatid sa Radyo5, Buhay Unleash, Frontline Pilipinas Weekend, Gus Abelgas Forensics (season 1), Inay Ko Po! and Power and Play on True FM TV (now True TV)
- May 4: Rekta: Agenda ng Masa on DZRH TV
- May 5: Chink Positive and Sunday Mass Live (Radio Veritas) on True FM TV (now True TV)
- May 10: The B Side (season 1) on Cinema One
- May 11: Hoy Bawal Yan on DZRH TV
- May 11: Running Man Philippines (season 2) on GTV and Pinoy Hits
- May 13: High Street on Jeepney TV and Kapamilya Channel
- May 16: FanPick on Hallypop
- May 16: Round Table with Roby on One News
- May 18: Gus Abelgas Forensics (seasons 2 and 3) on One PH
- May 19: Power and Play on RPTV
- May 25: What's Wrong with Secretary Kim (Philippine adaptation) on Kapamilya Channel
- May 27: ATM: Ano'ng Take Mo?, Gising Pilipinas, Headline Ngayon, Hello Attorney, Isyu Spotted, Kabayan, Kasalo, Pasada, Pintig ng Bayan, SKL: Share Ko Lang, Tatak: Serbisyo, TeleRadyo Serbisyo & Radyo 630 Special Coverage, TeleRadyo Serbisyo Balita, TeleRadyo Serbisyo Newsbreak and TV Patrol on Prime TV (now PRTV Prime Media)
- June 1: Ang Tinig N'yo, Anong Ganap?, Feel Kita, Headlines of the Day, Headline Ngayon Weekend, Iwas Sakit, Iwas Gastos, K-Paps Playlist, Ligtas Dapat, Pasado Serbisyo, Safe Space, Spot Report, TV Patrol Weekend, Wais Konsyumer and Win Today on Prime TV (now PRTV Prime Media)
- June 2: Aprub' Yan!, Bongga Ka Jhai!, GBU: God Bless U, Konek Ka D'yan!, Panalong Diskarte, Story Outlook, Travel ni Ahwel and Wow, Sikat! on Prime TV (now PRTV Prime Media)
- June 3: Deux Yeoza and The Sensible Life of Director Shin on Hallypop
- June 3: Superbook Reimagined (season 5) on Kapamilya Channel
- June 3: Abuhan on One PH
- June 3: Usapang Agrikultura on Radyo Pilipinas 1 Television
- June 8: TikTalk ng Bayan on Radyo Pilipinas 1 Television
- June 10: Padyak Princess on BuKo Channel
- June 16: Rosary Hour on Prime TV (now PRTV Prime Media)
- June 17: Pamilya Sagrado on Jeepney TV and Kapamilya Channel
- June 22: Doctor, Next Door (season 1) on One PH
- June 23: Gretchen Ho Reports on One News
- July 1: Back to Classics, Bangon Bagong Pilipinas, Mag Agri Tayo!, Bawat Gising May Blessing!, Decades of Sound: Classics to Now, DWAN 1206 News Alert, Dwance Groove, Hardball, KaLOGAN, Kapwa Mo, Sagot Ko, Morning Chill, Overthoughts Podcast, Tanghali Na Lang Ang Tapat!, Tutok 13 and Ulat Bayan on DWAN TV
- July 1: Widows' War on GTV and Pinoy Hits
- July 1: Yeojeong's Journey on Hallypop
- July 1: TV Patrol Express on Jeepney TV
- July 1: Goin' Bulilit (season 9), TV Patrol Express and Zoomers (season 2) on Kapamilya Channel
- July 1: Ako 'To Si Tyang Amy, Balitapatan, Headline sa Hapon, Johnson, Ikwento Mo, Kaserbisyo Balita, Kaserbisyo Special Coverage, Klinika 630, Nagseserbisyo, Niña Corpuz and Showbiz Sidelines on Prime TV (now PRTV Prime Media)
- July 1: Frontline Pilipinas on RPTV
- July 1: Ako 'To Si Tyang Amy, Balitapatan, Headline sa Hapon, Johnson, Ikwento Mo, Kaserbisyo Balita, Kaserbisyo Special Coverage, Klinika 630, Love Konek, Nagseserbisyo, Niña Corpuz and Showbiz Sidelines on TeleRadyo Serbisyo
- July 2: Remember Your Music on TeleRadyo Serbisyo
- July 6: Mobile Circuit, OPM Rewind, The Legal Weapon and Top Senate Stories on DWAN TV
- July 7: The Pop Phenomenon: K-pop and P-pop on DWAN TV
- July 7: Match Made! on One PH and True FM TV (now True TV)
- July 7: Private Talks on TeleRadyo Serbisyo
- July 8: Frontline Express on RPTV
- July 14: Wil To Win on BuKo Channel, One PH and Sari-Sari Channel
- July 15: Star Hunt: The Audition Show on Kapamilya Channel
- July 15: Frontline sa Umaga on RPTV
- July 17: Impormasyon at Aksyon sa Bagong Pilipinas on Radyo Pilipinas 1 Television
- July 20: Pinoy Big Brother: Gen 11 and Rainbow Rumble (season 1) on Kapamilya Channel
- July 20: Radyo Siyensiya on Radyo Pilipinas 1 Television
- July 22: Abot-Kamay na Pangarap on GTV
- July 22: Radyo5 Balita Pilipinas on True FM TV (now True TV)
- July 29: Pulang Araw on GTV
- July 29: 72 Seconds on Hallypop
- July 29: Pinoy in Paris on RPTV
- July 29: The Secret of Feriha (ETCerye) on SolarFlix
- August 3: People Should Know on DWAN TV
- August 5: Man in the Shower on Hallypop
- August 5: Malacañang Insider on Radyo Pilipinas 1 Television
- August 8: Young Guns on the Move on Congress TV
- August 11: ReFOODlika Na Sa Pilipinas on DWAN TV
- August 11: Negosyo Goals (season 4) on GTV
- August 18: Business Matters (season 11) on GTV and Heart of Asia
- August 21: Arangkada Balita (3rd incarnation), Botika ni Tita, DWIZ Network News, Karambola, Newscoop, Pasada Balita, Pilipinas Ngayon Na, Pinoy Gising!, Ronda Pilipinas, Sulong na Bayan, Usapang STL: Sa Totoo Lang, Usapang TOL and Yes, Yes Yo, Topacio! on DWIZ News TV
- August 22: NegoShow on DWIZ News TV
- August 23: Batas et Al (revived version) on RPTV
- August 24: Balitang Paliparan, Brgy. 882, Department of Help, El Pueblo Publico, Isyu ng Bayan, IZ Balita Sabado, Labanan Para sa Karapatan, Mr. Taxman, Pulis @ Ur Serbis, Sa Kabukiran at Kabuhayan, Sandigan ng Bayan, Sapul ni Jaruis Bondoc and Usapang Senado on DWIZ News TV
- August 25: Ano’ng Say ni Father, Ano’ng Say nina Brothers?, Bella Pilipina, IZ Balita Linggo, IZ Game Time, OPM sa DWIZ, Senior Citizen' Forum, The Financial District and Usapang Payaman! on DWIZ News TV
- August 25: Galing sa Puso on DZRH TV
- August 26: Mr. Hashtag on Hallypop
- August 27: Usapang STL: Sa Totoo Lang on DWIZ News TV
- September 2: Innerview on Hallypop
- September 2: Lavender Fields on Jeepney TV and Kapamilya Channel
- September 2: LGU Sports Center on Radyo Pilipinas 1 Television
- September 5: Leslie Bocobo Live on Radyo Pilipinas 1 Television
- September 7: The Lifestyle Lab on Bilyonaryo News Channel
- September 8: Chinese by Blood, Filipino by Heart (season 5) on One News
- September 9: Agenda, At the Forefront, Basis Points, Follow the Money, Industry Beacon, It's a Beautiful Day, NewsFeed @ Noon, NewsFeed, Pathways to Success, The Scorecard, Usapang Bilyonaryo, and Weather HQ on Bilyonaryo News Channel
- September 14: The Clash (season 6) on GTV
- September 15: The Voice Kids (season 6) on GTV
- September 15: The Final Pitch on One News
- September 16: Cinema G! on GTV
- September 22: I Heart PH (season 9) on GTV
- September 27: Astig Anime Friday and Sci-Fi Picks on Heart of Asia
- October 5: Kwatro Kantos on Bilyonaryo News Channel
- October 6: Kabuhayan at Negosyo on DWIZ News TV
- October 6: Kuan on One (seasons 1 and 2) on Kapamilya Channel
- October 12: Diskarteng Megamilyonaryo on Bilyonaryo News Channel
- October 12: One Balita Bai on One PH and True FM TV (now True TV)
- October 12: Balita Antemano on Prime TV (now PRTV Prime Media) and TeleRadyo Serbisyo
- October 13: Keep the Faith: Daily Mass with the Jesuits and The Word Exposed on Bilyonaryo News Channel
- October 14: Kape't Pandasal and World NewsFeed on Bilyonaryo News Channel
- October 14: GuesSing GuesSong on True FM TV (now True TV)
- October 19: Tambayan sa Barangay 1206 on DWAN TV
- October 21: Balitang Pambansa on DWAN TV and Radyo Pilipinas 1 Television
- October 21: Panalangin sa Alas-Tres ng Hapon on TeleRadyo Serbisyo
- October 24: Sagip Bagong Barangay ng Mamamayan in Action on DWIZ News TV
- October 26: Dayaw and NewsFeed Weekend on Bilyonaryo News Channel
- October 27: Weekend Agenda on Bilyonaryo News Channel
- October 28: On Point with Pinky Webb on Bilyonaryo News Channel
- October 28: Lutong Bahay (3rd incarnation) on GTV
- October 28: The Untamed on Kapamilya Channel
- November 2: Mega Blockbusters on Kapamilya Channel
- November 3: The Good Life on GTV
- November 4: Island Living Channel, Motivated 3x3 Basketball Tournament, Motivated Billard League, Game Room, Pigeon Isider, and The Game Changer on D8TV
- November 4: Play by Play on One News
- November 4: Good Morning, Bayan!, Quizmosa, Ted Failon at DJ Chacha sa True FM, True FM Balita Pilipinas and True FM News Update on True TV
- November 5: Beyond the Exchange on ANC
- November 6: Banker After Dark on ANC
- November 11: Face to Face: Harapan on One PH
- November 13: Safe House on One News
- November 16: Boom Balita (2nd incarnation) on DZRH TV
- November 18: Taxi Driver on Jeepney TV and Kapamilya Channel
- November 25: Overthoughts on DWAN TV
- November 25: Usapang Legal on DZRH TV
- November 26: WPS: West Philippine Sea on DZRH TV
- November 27: One Small Act on RPTV
- December 2: News Patrol and TV Patrol Express on ANC
- December 2: Bigayan Na with Boss Toyo!! and Pinoy Pawnstars on D8TV
- December 9: Life Balance on DWIZ News TV
- December 9: Pinoy Big Brother: Gen 11 Big 4 Ever on Kapamilya Channel
- December 21: Daig Kayo ng Lola Ko (season 5) on GTV
- December 31: PCSO Lottery Draw on D8TV and DWAN TV

==== Re-runs ====
- January 1: Hogu's Love on Heart of Asia^{26}
- January 1: Angelito: Ang Bagong Yugto and Kadenang Ginto on Jeepney TV^{1}
- January 2: Dugong Buhay on Cine Mo!^{1}^{8}
- January 6: Click, Like, Share (seasons 2 and 3) on Kapamilya Channel
- January 7: Meteo Heroes on GTV^{2}
- January 7: About Time on Heart of Asia^{2}
- January 8: Another Miss Oh^{2} and Gokusen (season 3)^{2}^{29} on Heart of Asia
- January 8: Wild Lands on Telenovela Channel
- January 14: Extraordinary You on Heart of Asia^{7}
- January 15: Mulawin vs. Ravena on Heart of Asia^{2}^{18}
- January 15: Adarna on Pinoy Hits^{2}^{18}^{33}
- January 20: Princess Hours on Heart of Asia^{1}^{2}^{8}^{15}
- January 22: Kokey @ Ako and My Super D on Jeepney TV^{1}
- January 22: Kokey @ Ako on Kapamilya Channel^{1}^{8}
- January 22: Rhodora X^{2}^{18}^{33} and The Millionaire's Wife^{2} on Pinoy Hits
- January 22: Love to Death on Telenovela Channel
- January 27: Come and Hug Me on Kapamilya Channel
- January 28: Ultraman Taiga on GTV^{2}
- January 29: Beauty Boy on Heart of Asia^{26}
- January 29: Dirty Linen and Mars Ravelo's Darna (2022) on Kapamilya Channel
- January 29: Sortilegio on Telenovela Channel
- February 1: Building Bridges^{24}, The Story of the Filipino^{24} and Tropa Mo Ko Unli^{3} on RPTV
- February 3: Bayan Ko on Pinoy Hits^{7}
- February 3: Demolition Job on RPTV^{3}
- February 4: Dinofroz on GTV^{2}
- February 4: Mr. Merman on Heart of Asia^{26}
- February 5: Ancient Love Poetry and Poong, the Joseon Psychiatrist (season 1) on Heart of Asia^{2}
- February 5: Apoy sa Dagat and My Little Juan on Jeepney TV^{1}
- February 5: F4 Thailand: Boys Over Flowers on Kapamilya Channel
- February 10: Home Along Da Riles on Jeepney TV^{1}
- February 12: Man of Vengeance on Heart of Asia^{2}
- February 17: Dino Dan^{2} and Simba: The Lion King^{2}^{26} on Heart of Asia
- February 18: General and I on Heart of Asia
- February 19: Delayed Justice^{26}, Mr. Queen^{2} and Queen Seondeok^{2}^{7}^{29} on Heart of Asia
- February 19: Bagani on Jeepney TV^{1}^{19}^{25}
- February 19: TODA One I Love on Pinoy Hits^{2}
- February 24: Scripting Your Destiny on Heart of Asia^{2}
- February 26: Code Name: Yong Pal^{2} and Girl Next Room^{26} on Heart of Asia
- February 26: Tubig at Langis on Jeepney TV^{1}
- March 1: Pwedeng Pwede on Cine Mo!^{1}^{8}
- March 3: Queen and I on Heart of Asia^{2}
- March 4: Habang May Buhay (2010) and Oh My G! on Jeepney TV^{1}
- March 9: Hanggang Saan on Jeepney TV^{1}
- March 9: Pinoy Explorer on RPTV^{3}
- March 10: Angry Birds Stella^{2} and Daimos^{1}^{2}^{22}^{27} on GTV
- March 11: Poong, the Joseon Psychiatrist (season 2) on Heart of Asia^{2}
- March 14: Tayong Dalawa on Cine Mo!^{1}^{8}
- March 16: Titser on Pinoy Hits^{7}
- March 17: FlordeLiza on Jeepney TV^{1}
- March 18: Precious Hearts Romances Presents: Lumayo Ka Man sa Akin on Jeepney TV^{1}
- March 25: Encantadia (2016) on Pinoy Hits^{2}
- March 31: My Ambulance on Heart of Asia
- March 31: Nasaan Ka Nang Kailangan Kita on Jeepney TV^{1}
- April 1: Get Fit and MedTalk Health Talk on RPTV^{24}
- April 6: Love in the Moonlight^{1}^{8}^{21}^{26} and The Witch's Diner^{2} on Heart of Asia
- April 6: Maalaala Mo Kaya on Jeepney TV^{1}^{19}^{25}
- April 7: Eve on GTV^{2}
- April 8: Komiks: Da Adventures of Pedro Penduko on Jeepney TV and Kapamilya Channel^{1}^{5}
- April 15: Bad Romeo^{2}, Game of Affection^{2}, Kingmaker: The Change of Destiny^{26} and Signal^{4}^{21}^{26} on Heart of Asia
- April 15: Honesto, Ningning and Walang Iwanan on Jeepney TV^{1}
- April 20: Celebrity Playtime^{1} and Palibhasa Lalake^{1}^{4} on Jeepney TV
- April 22: Bai Ling Tan^{2} and Goblin^{1}^{2} on Heart of Asia
- April 22: Krystala and Precious Hearts Romances Presents: Somewhere in My Heart on Jeepney TV^{1}
- April 27: Art of the Spirit on Heart of Asia
- April 28: Playful Kiss on Heart of Asia^{2}
- April 29: I Hear Your Voice on Heart of Asia^{2}
- April 29: The Lost Recipe on Pinoy Hits^{7}^{26}
- May 4: Count Your Lucky Stars on Kapamilya Channel
- May 5: Ultraman Z and Wolfblood (seasons 3–4) on GTV^{2}
- May 5: Show Window: The Queen's House on Heart of Asia^{2}
- May 6: Voltes V: Legacy on Pinoy Hits
- May 12: Angry Birds Toons on GTV^{2}
- May 13: The Heirs on GTV^{1}^{8}^{33}
- May 13: Room No. 9 on Heart of Asia^{26}
- May 13: Budoy^{1}, Forevermore^{1}^{34}, May Bukas Pa (2009)^{1}, On the Wings of Love^{1}^{34} and Pangako sa 'Yo (2015)^{1} on Jeepney TV
- May 13: Grazilda on Pinoy Hits^{2}^{33}
- May 18: The Red Sleeve on Heart of Asia^{2}
- May 18: KBYN: Kaagapay ng Bayan^{19}^{25} and Love in 40 Days^{3}^{19}^{25} on Jeepney TV
- May 19: Paano Kita Mapasasalamatan?^{19}^{25}, Sana Maulit Muli^{1} and Viral Scandal^{3}^{19}^{25} on Jeepney TV
- May 20: Precious Hearts Romances Presents: Pintada on Jeepney TV^{1}
- May 26: One the Woman on Heart of Asia^{2}
- May 27: My Roommate is a Gumiho on Heart of Asia^{2}
- May 27: 2gether: The Series on Kapamilya Channel
- May 27: Buena Familia and Hiram na Alaala on Pinoy Hits^{2}^{18}
- June 1: Katipunan on Pinoy Hits^{2}^{18}
- June 2: The Frog Prince on Heart of Asia^{26}
- June 3: An Oriental Odyssey on Heart of Asia^{2}
- June 3: Batas et Al (2023 original version) and Building Bridges on RPTV^{24}
- June 8: Komiks Presents: Tiny Tony on Jeepney TV^{1}^{5}
- June 10: Now, We Are Breaking Up and Tale of the Nine Tailed on Heart of Asia^{2}
- June 10: Komiks: Pedro Penduko at ang Mga Engkantao^{1}^{5} and Langit Lupa^{1} on Jeepney TV
- June 10: Komiks: Pedro Penduko at ang Mga Engkantao on Kapamilya Channel^{1}^{5}^{8}
- June 15: Her Bucket List and Revenge Note on Heart of Asia^{2}
- June 16: The Unlisted on GTV^{2}
- June 17: Jirisan^{2} and Jumong^{2}^{16}^{26} on Heart of Asia
- June 17: Agua Bendita on Jeepney TV^{1}
- June 23: To Me, It's Simply You on Heart of Asia^{2}
- June 24: Game of Outlaws^{2} and Tomorrow's Cantabile^{26} on Heart of Asia
- June 24: Precious Hearts Romances Presents: Impostor on Jeepney TV^{1}
- July 1: Jewel in the Palace on Heart of Asia^{2}^{7}^{16}^{26}^{29}
- July 8: Flame of Recca^{2}^{7} and The Penthouse (season 1)^{2}^{33} on GTV
- July 8: In Need of Romance 3 on Heart of Asia^{26}
- July 8: Little Nanay^{2}, Mundo Mo'y Akin^{2}^{33} and Mulawin vs. Ravena^{2} on Pinoy Hits
- July 13: Dyesebel (2014) on Jeepney TV^{1}
- July 15: Huwag Ka Lang Mawawala on Jeepney TV^{1}
- July 15: The Story of the Filipino on RPTV^{24}
- July 20: Blacklist and Doctor John on Heart of Asia^{26}
- July 21: Angry Birds Blues on GTV^{2}
- July 21: Tara, G! on Kapamilya Channel
- July 22: Bora: Sons of the Beach on Cine Mo!^{1}
- July 22: Prophecy of Love on Heart of Asia^{2}
- July 22: Agimat: Ang Mga Alamat ni Ramon Revilla, Mutya and Moon of Desire on Jeepney TV^{1}
- July 22: Agimat: Ang Mga Alamat ni Ramon Revilla on Kapamilya Channel^{1}
- July 29: Bride of the Water God and Ghost Doctor on Heart of Asia^{2}
- July 29: Rubi (2010) on Jeepney TV^{1}
- July 29: The Killer Bride^{1} and Walang Hanggang Paalam on Kapamilya Channel
- July 29: Sahaya on Pinoy Hits^{2}
- August 10: The Merciless Judge on Heart of Asia^{26}
- August 10: Still 2gether on Kapamilya Channel
- August 11: Bleach (season 2) on GTV^{2}
- August 11: Moon Embracing the Sun on Heart of Asia^{2}^{26}
- August 12: The Herbal Master and The World of Fantasy on Heart of Asia^{2}
- August 17: The Skywatcher on Heart of Asia^{2}
- August 18: Kamen Rider Zero-One on GTV^{2}
- August 18: Backstreet Rookie on Heart of Asia^{2}
- August 19: Magkano ang Iyong Dangal? on Jeepney TV^{1}
- August 24: Puppy in my Pocket: Adventures in Pocketville and Ultraman R/B on Heart of Asia^{2}^{26}
- August 24: Sirkus on Pinoy Hits^{2}^{7}
- August 26: What's Wrong with Secretary Kim on Heart of Asia^{1}^{2}^{21}
- August 26: Momay on Jeepney TV^{1}
- August 27: Jujutsu Kaisen (season 1) on GTV^{2}
- August 31: The Maid on Heart of Asia^{2}
- September 1: Oggy and the Cockroaches on GTV^{1}^{2}^{3}
- September 1: Kahit Isang Saglit on Jeepney TV^{1}
- September 2: The Penthouse (season 2) on GTV^{2}^{33}
- September 2: E-Boy and Maria Flordeluna on Jeepney TV^{1}
- September 2: Barangay Singko Panalo^{3}, MedTalk Health Talk^{24} and Tropa Mo Ko Unli^{3} on RPTV
- September 7: Volta on Jeepney TV^{1}
- September 9: Queen and I and You Are My Heartbeat on Heart of Asia^{2}
- September 9: Juan Happy Love Story^{2}^{33} and Katipunan^{2}^{18} on Pinoy Hits
- September 14: Bagong Umaga^{19}^{25} and Wako Wako^{1}^{5} on Jeepney TV
- September 14: The Forbidden Flower on Kapamilya Channel
- September 16: The Romantic Doctor 2 and The Wolf on Heart of Asia^{2}
- September 22: Estudyantipid on Kapamilya Channel^{23}
- September 29: The Penthouse (season 3) on GTV^{2}^{33}
- September 29: Boys Over Flowers^{1}^{7}^{8}^{15}^{26} and Poong, the Joseon Psychiatrist (season 1)^{2} on Heart of Asia
- September 30: Guns and Roses on Cine Mo!^{1}^{8}
- September 30: The Long Ballad on Heart of Asia^{2}
- September 30: Love Thy Woman on Jeepney TV^{1}^{19}
- September 30: Kapamilya, Deal or No Deal (season 5) on Kapamilya Channel^{1}
- October 1: Da Body en da Guard on Cine Mo!^{1}
- October 1: Get Fit on RPTV^{24}
- October 5: Pangarap na Bituin on Jeepney TV^{1}
- October 6: The Worst Witch (season 1) on GTV^{2}
- October 6: From the Heart Specials: Pumpkin Time and God of Lost Fantasy^{2} on Heart of Asia
- October 7: Dong Yi^{2}^{7} and Nabi, My Stepdarling^{26} on Heart of Asia
- October 7: The Legend of Bruce Lee on SolarFlix^{16}^{29}
- October 13: Hiram on Jeepney TV^{1}
- October 14: 46 Days on Heart of Asia^{2}
- October 14: Bukas na Lang Kita Mamahalin, Little Champ and Marina on Jeepney TV^{1}
- October 14: Marina on Kapamilya Channel^{1}
- October 21: Delayed Justice^{26} and Romantic Deception^{2} on Heart of Asia
- October 21: Inday Bote and Kambal sa Uma on Jeepney TV^{1}
- October 27: Walang Kapalit on Jeepney TV^{1}
- October 28: The Witch's Diner on GTV^{2}^{33}
- October 28: Beauty Boy^{26}, Bleach (season 2)^{2}^{26} and Jewel in the Palace^{2}^{7}^{16}^{26}^{29} on Heart of Asia
- October 28: Magkaribal and Mga Anghel na Walang Langit on Jeepney TV^{1}
- November 1: The Story of the Filipino on RPTV^{24}
- November 2: Oki Doki Doc on Jeepney TV^{1}
- November 3: Tokyo Revengers and Where's Chicky? on GTV^{2}
- November 4: Goblin on GTV^{1}^{2}^{21}^{33}
- November 4: Building Bridges on RPTV^{24}
- November 9: One Night Steal on Heart of Asia^{2}
- November 9: Nathaniel on Jeepney TV^{1}
- November 10: Boy For Rent on Heart of Asia^{26}
- November 11: Kaya ni Mister, Kaya ni Misis on Cine Mo!^{1}
- November 11: My Name is Busaba on Heart of Asia^{2}
- November 15: Fear Times on GTV
- November 16: Dino Dana and Third Rail on Heart of Asia^{2}
- November 16: Super Inggo at ang Super Tropa on Kapamilya Channel^{1}^{10}
- November 17: Meteo Heroes and Sunny Bunnies on GTV^{2}
- November 18: Douluo Continent and Miracle of Love on Heart of Asia^{2}
- November 18: Lorenzo's Time and Nang Ngumiti ang Langit on Jeepney TV^{1}
- November 23: Ultraman Taiga on Heart of Asia^{2}^{26}
- November 25: Iisa Pa Lamang on Jeepney TV^{1}
- December 1: Sa Puso Ko, Iingatan Ka on Jeepney TV^{1}
- December 2: Yumi's Cells on GTV^{2}
- December 2: Precious Hearts Romances Presents: Mana Po^{1} and The General's Daughter^{1}^{19} on Jeepney TV
- December 8: Buck on GTV^{2}
- December 9: Queen Seondeok on Heart of Asia^{2}^{7}^{29}
- December 9: La Vida Lena on Jeepney TV
- December 14: Ancient Love Poetry on Heart of Asia^{2}
- December 14: Lastikman on Jeepney TV^{1}^{19}
- December 15: Legend of the Blue Sea^{1}^{21}^{26} and Rewriting Destiny^{2} on Heart of Asia
- December 16: Love in the Moonlight on GTV^{1}^{8}^{21}^{33}
- December 16: Jinxed at First and Shooting Stars on Heart of Asia^{2}
- December 23: Detective Conan (season 9)^{2}^{26}, Dr. Tang^{2} and Eclipse of the Heart^{2} on Heart of Asia
- December 23: Mirabella on Jeepney TV^{1}
- December 28: Born for You and Ikaw Lamang on Jeepney TV^{1}
- December 29: My Shy Boss on Heart of Asia^{2}
- December 30: Hello from the Other Side on Heart of Asia^{26}
- December 30: All of Me^{1} and Kung Fu Kids^{1}^{5} on Jeepney TV

Notes

1. ^ ^{a} Originally aired on ABS-CBN (now Kapamilya Channel)
2. ^ ^{b} Originally aired on GMA
3. ^ ^{c} Originally aired on TV5
4. ^ ^{d} Originally aired on Cine Mo!
5. ^ ^{e} Originally aired on Yey! (now defunct)
6. ^ ^{f} Originally aired on S+A (now Aliw 23)
7. ^ ^{g} Originally aired on GMA News TV (now GTV)
8. ^ ^{h} Originally aired on Jeepney TV
9. ^ ^{i} Originally aired on Sari-Sari Channel
10. ^ ^{j} Originally aired on Hero (now defunct)
11. ^ ^{k} Originally aired on ETC (now SolarFlix)
12. ^ ^{l} Originally aired on Jack TV (now defunct)
13. ^ ^{m} Originally aired on 2nd Avenue (now defunct)
14. ^ ^{n} Originally aired on CT (now defunct)
15. ^ ^{o} Originally aired on Studio 23 (now Aliw 23)
16. ^ ^{p} Originally aired on Q (now GTV)
17. ^ ^{q} Originally aired on RPN (now RPTV)
18. ^ ^{r} Originally aired on Fox Filipino (now defunct)
19. ^ ^{s} Originally aired on Kapamilya Channel
20. ^ ^{t} Originally aired on Metro Channel
21. ^ ^{u} Originally aired on Asianovela Channel (now defunct)
22. ^ ^{v} Originally aired on PTV
23. ^ ^{w} Originally aired on Knowledge Channel
24. ^ ^{x} Originally aired on CNN Philippines (now defunct)
25. ^ ^{y} Originally aired on A2Z
26. ^ ^{z} Originally aired on GTV
27. ^ ^{aa} Originally aired on IBC
28. ^ ^{ab} Originally aired on ABC (now TV5)
29. ^ ^{ac} Originally aired on TeleAsia Filipino (now defunct)
30. ^ ^{ad} Originally aired on One Screen (now defunct)
31. ^ ^{ae} Originally aired on Colours (now defunct)
32. ^ ^{af} Originally aired on SolarFlix
33. ^ ^{ag} Originally aired on Heart of Asia Channel
34. ^ ^{ah} Originally aired on PIE Channel (now defunct)

=== Video streaming services ===
The following are programs that debuted on video streaming services:

- January 2: TV Patrol Express on Facebook and YouTube (ABS-CBN News)
- January 15: Zoomers (season 1) on YouTube (ABS-CBN Entertainment)
- January 20: Iskool Rul3z on Facebook and YouTube (PIE)
- February 12: All TV News: Top of the Hour on Facebook (All TV News)
- March 1: Roadkillers on Viva One
- March 18: What's Wrong with Secretary Kim (Philippine adaptation) on Viu
- May 10: Sem Break on Viva One
- May 11: High Street on iWantTFC
- June 14: Pamilya Sagrado on iWantTFC
- June 15: Stars on Stars on Facebook and YouTube (Jeepney TV)
- June 24: Marahuyo Project on YouTube (Anima Studios)
- June 26: Sparks Camp (season 2) on YouTube (Black Sheep)
- July 1: Zoomers (season 2) on YouTube (ABS-CBN Entertainment)
- July 1: NewsWatch Live and NewsWatch Now (2nd incarnation) on YouTube (NewsWatch Plus)
- July 2: Kuan on One (season 1) on iWantTFC and YouTube (ABS-CBN Entertainment)
- July 4: LOL: Last One Laughing Philippines (season 1) on Amazon Prime Video
- July 6: Zoom In with Menchu Macapagal on YouTube (NewsWatch Plus)
- July 26: Pulang Araw on Netflix
- August 2: Batas et Al (revived version) on YouTube (NewsWatch Plus)
- August 7: Drag Race Philippines (season 3) and Drag Race Philippines: Untucked! (season 3) on HBO Go and WOW Presents Plus
- August 15: Manila Conversations with Tristan Nodalo on YouTube (NewsWatch Plus)
- August 16: Chasing in the Wild on Viva One
- August 20: The Other Office with Lois Calderon on YouTube (NewsWatch Plus)
- August 30: Lavender Fields on Netflix
- August 31: Lavender Fields on iWantTFC
- October 18: Halfmates on YouTube (ABS-CBN Entertainment)
- November 12: Kuan on One (season 2) on iWantTFC and YouTube (ABS-CBN Entertainment)
- November 25: How to Spot a Red Flag on Viu
- November 28: Saving Grace on Amazon Prime Video
- December 7: Your Honor on YouTube (YoüLOL)

== Returning or renamed programs ==
=== Major networks ===
Show	Last aired	Retitled as/Season/Notes	Channel	Return date
Kapuso Primetime Cinema	2016 (as Monday–Thursday Edition)	Same (as weeknight Edition)	GMA / Pinoy Hits	January 1
E.A.T.	2024	Eat Bulaga!	TV5 / BuKo Channel / CNN Philippines (now RPTV)	January 6
Jose & Maria's Bonggang Villa	2022	Same (season 2)	GMA / Pinoy Hits	January 20
Linlang	2006 (GMA)	Linlang: The Teleserye Version	A2Z / Jeepney TV / Kapamilya Channel / TV5	January 22
Wanted sa Radyo	2019 (AksyonTV)	Same	TV5 / RPTV	February 1 (RPTV); February 21 (TV5)
Walang Matigas na Pulis sa Matinik na Misis	2023	Same (season 2)	GMA / Pinoy Hits	February 4
The Voice Teens	2020	Same (season 3)	A2Z / Kapamilya Channel / TV5	February 17
American Idol	2019 (ETC)	Same (season 22)	TV5	March 31
Mga Kwento ni Marc Logan	2017 (ABS-CBN)	Top 5: Mga Kwentong Marc Logan	TV5 / One PH	April 6
Daig Kayo ng Lola Ko	2024	Same (season 3)	GMA / Pinoy Hits	April 6
Aksyon sa Tanghali	2020	Frontline Express	TV5 / RPTV	April 8
Mission Possible	2020 (ABS-CBN / DZMM TeleRadyo / Jeepney TV)	Julius Babao Unplugged	TV5 / One PH	April 13 (One PH); September 22 (TV5)
Running Man Philippines	2022	Same (season 2)	GMA / GTV / Pinoy Hits	May 11
Senior High	2024	High Street	A2Z / Jeepney TV / Kapamilya Channel / TV5	May 13
Gus Abelgas Forensics	2023	Same (season 2)	TV5 / RPTV / One PH	May 18
What's Wrong with Secretary Kim	2018 (ABS-CBN) / 2019 (Asianovela Channel) / 2023 (GMA)	Same (Philippine adaptation)	A2Z / Kapamilya Channel / TV5	May 25
Daig Kayo ng Lola Ko	2024	Same (season 4)	GMA	June 1
Goin' Bulilit	2019 (ABS-CBN)	Same (season 9)	A2Z / All TV / Kapamilya Channel	July 1
Widows' Web	2022	Widows' War	GMA / GTV / Pinoy Hits	July 1
Zoomers	2024 (season 1)	Same (season 2)	A2Z / Kapamilya Channel / TV5	July 1
Wowowin	2023 (All TV)	Wil To Win	TV5 / BuKo Channel / One PH / Sari-Sari Channel	July 14
Star Hunt: The Grand Audition Show	2018 (ABS-CBN)	Star Hunt: The Audition Show	A2Z / Kapamilya Channel / TV5	July 15
Pinoy Big Brother	2022	Same (season 11: "Gen 11")	A2Z / Kapamilya Channel / TV5	July 20
Shining Inheritance	2010	Same (Philippine adaptation)	GMA	September 9
The Clash	2023	Same (season 6)	GMA / GTV	September 14
The Voice Kids	2023 (A2Z / Kapamilya Channel / TV5)	Same (season 6)	GMA / GTV	September 15
Niña Niño	2022	Ang Himala ni Niño	TV5	September 30
Home Base Plus	2024	Same (season 25)	GMA	October 27
Kapamilya Mega Blockbusters	2018 (ABS-CBN)	Mega Blockbusters	A2Z / Kapamilya Channel	November 2
Face to Face	2024 (2nd Incarnation)	Face to Face: Harapan	TV5 / One PH	November 11
Matanglawin	2020 (ABS-CBN / Jeepney TV)	Dami Mong Alam, Kuya Kim!	GMA	November 30
Power Rangers	2020 (Yey!)	Same (season 21: "Beast Morphers")	GMA	December 2
Daig Kayo ng Lola Ko	2024	Same (season 5)	GMA / GTV	December 21
Walang Matigas na Pulis sa Matinik na Misis	2024	Same (season 3)	GMA	December 22

=== State-owned networks ===
Show	Last aired	Retitled as/Season/Notes	Channel	Return date
Serbisyo Muna	2008 (NBN)	Same	PTV	January 27
Expertalk	2024	Same (season 4)	PTV	October 5
Siyensikat	2024 (CNN Philippines)	Same (season 5)	PTV	October 6

=== Minor networks ===
Show	Last aired	Retitled as/Season/Notes	Channel	Return date
Hataw Balita Pilipinas	2024	Hataw Balita Ngayon	UNTV	February 5
Pasada Balita	2023	Same	Aliw 23	March 4
Radyo5 Network News	2021 (TV5) / 2023 (One PH)	DWIZ Network News	Aliw 23	March 4
One Liter of Tears	2009 (GMA)	One Litre of Tears	Net 25	April 1
Batas et Al	2024 (CNN Philippines)	Same (revived version)	Aliw 23	August 15
Bagong Barangay ng Mamamayan in Action	2024	Sagip Bagong Barangay ng Mamamayan in Action	Aliw 23 / DWIZ News TV	October 24

=== Other channels ===
Show	Last aired	Retitled as/Season/Notes	Channel	Return date
Chink Positive	2019 (AksyonTV)	Same	RPTV	February 3
Negosyo Goals	2023 (All TV)	Same (season 3)	GTV	February 11
Buena Manong Balita (Dobol B TV)	2021	Same	GTV	February 12
UAAP Men's & Women's Volleyball	2023	Same (season 86)	One Sports / UAAP Varsity Channel	February 17
Premier Volleyball League	2023 (season 6: "Second All-Filipino Conference")	Same (season 7: "All-Filipino Conference"; season 20 as Shakey's V-League)	One Sports / One Sports+ / RPTV	February 20
Philippine Basketball Association	2024 (A2Z / One PH; season 48: "Commissioner's Cup")	Same (season 48: "Philippine Cup")	PBA Rush / RPTV	February 28
MBC Network News	2024	MBC TV Network News	DZRH TV	March 4
Garantisadong Balita	2020 (TeleRadyo)	Radyo 630 Balita	TeleRadyo Serbisyo	March 4
Ito ang Radyo Patrol	2020 (DZMM TeleRadyo)	Yan Tayo	TeleRadyo Serbisyo	March 9
Kape at Salita	2021 (TeleRadyo)	Sunny Side Up	TeleRadyo Serbisyo	March 10
Spikers' Turf	2023 (season 6: "Invitational Conference")	Same (season 7: "Open Conference")	One Sports / One Sports+	March 13
PBA D-League	2023 (One Sports / PBA Rush; season 10: "Aspirants' Cup")	Same (season 11: "Aspirants' Cup")	PBA Rush / RPTV	March 14
Maharlika Pilipinas Basketball League	2023	Same (season 6)	Media Pilipinas TV (MPTV) / One PH	April 6
NCAA Women's Volleyball	2023	Same (season 99)	GTV	April 7
Perfect Morning	2023 (One PH)	Sagot Kita	True FM TV (now True TV)	May 1
Dr. Love Radio Show	2022 (TeleRadyo)	Same	True FM TV (now True TV)	May 1
Tulong Ko, Pasa Mo	2023 (TeleRadyo)	Buhay Unleash	True FM TV (now True TV)	May 4
Power and Play	2019 (AksyonTV)	Same	True FM TV (now True TV) / RPTV	May 4 (True FM TV); May 19 (RPTV)
Hardball	2019 (ANC)	Same (2nd incarnation)	DWAN TV	July 1
TeleRadyo Serbisyo Newsbreak	2024	Kaserbisyo Balita	Prime TV (now PRTV Prime Media) / TeleRadyo Serbisyo	July 1
Pasada	2024	Balitapatan	Prime TV (now PRTV Prime Media) / TeleRadyo Serbisyo	July 1
Salamat Dok	2020 (ABS-CBN / ANC)	Klinika 630	Prime TV (now PRTV Prime Media) / TeleRadyo Serbisyo	July 1
A.M.Y. (About Me & You)	2010 (DZMM TeleRadyo)	Ako 'To Si Tyang Amy	Prime TV (now PRTV Prime Media) / TeleRadyo Serbisyo	July 1
Headline Ngayon Express	2023	Headline sa Hapon	Prime TV (now PRTV Prime Media) / TeleRadyo Serbisyo	July 1
Good Vibes	2020 (TeleRadyo)	Nagseserbisyo, Niña Corpuz	Prime TV (now PRTV Prime Media) / TeleRadyo Serbisyo	July 1
Pintig ng Bayan	2024	Johnson, Ikwento Mo	Prime TV (now PRTV Prime Media) / TeleRadyo Serbisyo	July 1
Showbuzz	2020 (DZMM TeleRadyo)	Showbiz Sidelines	Prime TV (now PRTV Prime Media) / TeleRadyo Serbisyo	July 1
Lovelines	2013 (DZMM TeleRadyo)	Love Konek	TeleRadyo Serbisyo	July 1
Moonlight Serenade	2020 (DZMM TeleRadyo)	Remember Your Music	TeleRadyo Serbisyo	July 2
Private Nights	2020 (DZMM TeleRadyo)	Private Talks	TeleRadyo Serbisyo	July 7
Premier Volleyball League	2024 (season 7: "All-Filipino Conference")	Same (season 7: "Reinforced Invitational Conference"; season 20 as Shakey's V-League)	One Sports / One Sports+ / RPTV	July 16
Negosyo Goals	2024	Same (season 4)	GTV	August 11
Philippine Basketball Association	2024 (season 48: "Philippine Cup")	Same (season 49: "Governors' Cup")	PBA Rush / RPTV	August 18
Business Matters	2023 (CNN Philippines)	Same (season 11)	GTV / Heart of Asia	August 18
Batas et Al	2024 (CNN Philippines)	Same (revived version)	RPTV	August 23
National Collegiate Athletic Association	2024	Same (season 100)	GTV / Heart of Asia	September 7
University Athletic Association of the Philippines	2024	Same (season 87)	One Sports / UAAP Varsity Channel	September 7
Chinese by Blood, Filipino by Heart	2023 (CNN Philippines)	Same (season 5)	One News	September 8
The Score	2020 (Liga / S+A)	The Scorecard	Bilyonaryo News Channel	September 9
Usapang Bilyonaryo	2024 (CNN Philippines)	Same	Bilyonaryo News Channel	September 9
I Heart PH	2023 (CNN Philippines)	Same (season 9)	GTV	September 22
East Asia Super League	2024	Same (2024–25 season)	One Sports+ / PBA Rush / RPTV	October 2
Magpayo Nga Kayo	2020 (TeleRadyo)	Balita Antemano	Prime TV (now PRTV Prime Media) / TeleRadyo Serbisyo	October 12
Kape't Pandasal	2020 (ABS-CBN)	Same	Bilyonaryo News Channel	October 14
Spikers' Turf	2024 (season 7: "Open Conference")	Same (season 7: "Invitational Conference")	One Sports / One Sports+	October 16
Panalangin sa Alas-Tres ng Hapon	2020 (TeleRadyo)	Same	Prime TV (now PRTV Prime Media) / TeleRadyo Serbisyo	October 21
National Basketball Association	2024 (NBA TV Philippines / One Sports)	Same (2024–25 season)	NBA TV Philippines / One Sports / RPTV	October 23
The Source with Pinky Webb	2024 (CNN Philippines)	On Point with Pinky Webb	Bilyonaryo News Channel	October 28
Lutong Bahay	2002 (NBN)	Same (3rd incarnation)	GTV	October 28
Ted Failon at DJ Chacha sa Radyo5	2024 (TV5 / One News / One PH / RPTV / True FM TV)	Ted Failon at DJ Chacha sa True FM	One PH / RPTV / True TV	November 4
Radyo5 Balita Pilipinas	2024 (True FM TV)	True FM Balita Pilipinas	True TV	November 4
Radyo5 News Update	2024 (True FM TV)	True FM News Update	True TV	November 4
The Exchange with Rico Hizon	2024 (CNN Philippines)	Beyond the Exchange	ANC	November 5
Premier Volleyball League	2024 (season 7: "Invitational Conference")	Same (season 7: "Second All-Filipino Conference"; season 20 as Shakey's V-League)	One Sports / One Sports+	November 9
Boom Balita	2013 (RHTV)	Same (2nd incarnaton)	DZRH TV	November 16
Overthoughts Podcast	2024	Overthoughts	DWAN TV	November 25
Dos Kumpanyeras	2024	Usapang Legal	DZRH TV	November 25
Philippine Basketball Association	2024 (season 49: "Governors' Cup")	Same (season 49: "Commissioner's Cup")	PBA Rush / RPTV	November 27

=== Video streaming services ===
Show	Last aired	Retitled as/Season/Notes	Service	Return date
What's Wrong with Secretary Kim	2018 (ABS-CBN) / 2019 (Asianovela Channel) / 2023 (GMA)	Same (Philippine adaptation)	Viu	March 18
Senior High	2024	High Street	iWantTFC	May 11
Sparks Camp	2023	Same (season 2)	YouTube (Black Sheep)	June 26
Zoomers	2024	Same (season 2)	YouTube (ABS-CBN Entertainment)	July 1
NewsWatch	2012 (RPN)	NewsWatch Live	YouTube (NewsWatch Plus)	July 1
NewsWatch Now	2007 (RPN)	Same (2nd incarnation)	YouTube (NewsWatch Plus)	July 1
Batas et Al	2024 (CNN Philippines)	Same (revived version)	YouTube (NewsWatch Plus)	August 2
Kuan on One	2024	Same (season 2)	iWantTFC and YouTube (ABS-CBN Entertainment)	November 12

== Programs transferring networks ==
=== Major networks ===
Date	Show	No. of seasons	Moved from	Moved to
January 6	Eat Bulaga!	—N/a	GMA (under TAPE Inc.)	TV5 / CNN Philippines (now RPTV) (under TVJ Productions)
March 31	American Idol	22	ETC (now SolarFlix)	TV5
April 6	Mga Kwento ni Marc Logan	—N/a	ABS-CBN (now Kapamilya Channel)	TV5 (as Top 5: Mga Kwentong Marc Logan)
April 6	It's Showtime	—N/a	Jeepney TV	GMA
May 13	Magandang Buhay	—N/a	TV5	All TV / Jeepney TV
July 14	Wowowin	—N/a	All TV	TV5 / BuKo Channel / Sari-Sari Channel / One PH (as Wil To Win)
September 15	The Voice Kids	6	A2Z / Kapamilya Channel / TV5	GMA
October 27	Home Base Plus	25	GTV	GMA
November 30	Matanglawin	—N/a	ABS-CBN (now Kapamilya Channel) / Jeepney TV	GMA (as Dami Mong Alam, Kuya Kim!)
December 2	Power Rangers	21	Yey!	GMA

=== State-owned networks ===
Date	Show	No. of seasons	Moved from	Moved to
October 6	Siyensikat	5	CNN Philippines (now RPTV)	PTV
December 31	PCSO Lottery Draw	—N/a	PTV	D8TV / DWAN TV / IBC

=== Minor networks ===
Date	Show	No. of seasons	Moved from	Moved to
March 4	Radyo5 Network News	—N/a	TV5 / One PH	Aliw 23 (as DWIZ Network News)
April 1	One Liter of Tears	—N/a	GMA	Net 25 (as One Litre of Tears)

=== Other channels ===
Date	Show	No. of seasons	Moved from	Moved to
February 1	Wanted sa Radyo	—N/a	AksyonTV (now One Sports)	RPTV
February 3	Chink Positive	—N/a	AksyonTV (now One Sports)	RPTV
February 11	Negosyo Goals	3	All TV	GTV
February 28	Philippine Basketball Association	48	A2Z / One PH	RPTV
March 14	PBA D-League	11	One Sports	RPTV
April 13	Mission Possible	—N/a	ABS-CBN (now Kapamilya Channel) / DZMM TeleRadyo (now TeleRadyo Serbisyo) / Jeepney TV	One PH (as Julius Babao Unplugged)
May 1	Perfect Morning	—N/a	One PH	True FM TV (as Sagot Kita)
May 1	Dr. Love Radio Show	—N/a	TeleRadyo (now TeleRadyo Serbisyo)	True FM TV (now True TV)
May 6	Tulong Ko, Pasa Mo	—N/a	TeleRadyo (now TeleRadyo Serbisyo)	True FM TV (now True TV) (as Buhay Unleash)
May 19	Power and Play	—N/a	AksyonTV (now One Sports)	RPTV
July 1	Hardball	—N/a	ANC	DWAN TV
August 11	Home Base Plus	24	GMA	GTV
August 18	Business Matters	11	CNN Philippines (now RPTV)	GTV / Heart of Asia
September 8	CHInoyTV	—N/a	CNN Philippines (now RPTV)	One News
September 9	The Score	—N/a	S+A (now Aliw 23)	Bilyonaryo News Channel (as The Scorecard)
September 9	Usapang Bilyonaryo	—N/a	CNN Philippines (now RPTV)	Bilyonaryo News Channel
September 22	I Heart PH	9	CNN Philippines (now RPTV)	GTV
October 14	Kape't Pandasal	—N/a	ABS-CBN (now Kapamilya Channel)	Bilyonaryo News Channel
October 23	National Basketball Association	79	TV5	RPTV
October 28	The Source with Pinky Webb	—N/a	CNN Philippines (now RPTV)	Bilyonaryo News Channel (as On Point with Pinky Webb)
October 28	Lutong Bahay	—N/a	NBN (now PTV)	GTV
November 5	The Exchange with Rico Hizon	—N/a	CNN Philippines (now RPTV)	ANC (as Beyond the Exchange)
November	Abante Pilipinas	—N/a	NBN (now PTV)	Abante TeleTabloid

=== Video streaming services ===
Date	Show	No. of seasons	Moved from	Moved to
July 1	NewsWatch	—N/a	RPN (now RPTV)	YouTube (NewsWatch Plus) (as NewsWatch Live)
July 1	NewsWatch Now	—N/a	RPN (now RPTV)	YouTube (NewsWatch Plus)

== Milestone episodes ==
The following shows made their Milestone episodes in 2024:

Show	Network	Episode #	Episode title	Episode air date
Rated Korina	A2Z / Kapamilya Channel / TV5	1,000th	"1,000th Episode"	January 6
Senior High	A2Z / Jeepney TV / Kapamilya Channel / TV5	100th	"Sacrifice"	January 12
Tadhana	GMA / Pinoy Hits	300th	"Pinaasa (Part 2)"	January 13
Face 2 Face	TV5 / One PH	200th	"Aswang"	January 26
TiktoClock	GMA	400th	"400th episode"	February 14
Family Feud (4th incarnation)	GMA	400th	"Club Mwah vs. Slay Zone"	February 16
Kapuso Mo, Jessica Soho	GMA / GTV / Pinoy Hits	1,000th	"1,000th Episode"	February 25
Can't Buy Me Love	A2Z / Jeepney TV / Kapamilya Channel / TV5	100th	"Dig Deeper"	March 1
Fast Talk with Boy Abunda	GMA / Pinoy Hits	300th	"HORI7ON"	March 20
Gud Morning Kapatid	TV5	200th	"200th Episode"	March 22
Black Rider	GMA / GTV / Pinoy Hits	100th	"Sugod Na"	March 22
Amazing Earth	GMA / Pinoy Hits	300th	"300th Episode"	April 5
It's Showtime	A2Z / GMA / GTV / Kapamilya Channel	4,000th	"My FUNanghalian"	April 10
FPJ's Batang Quiapo	A2Z / Kapamilya Channel / TV5	300th	"Ex-Convict"	April 11
Abot-Kamay na Pangarap	GMA / Pinoy Hits	500th	"Hawahan"	April 17
Dapat Alam Mo!	GTV / Pinoy Hits	700th	"700th Episode"	May 7
Magandang Buhay	A2Z / Kapamilya Channel	1,200th	"1,200th Episode"	May 10
Pepito Manaloto: Tuloy Ang Kuwento	GMA / Pinoy Hits	100th	"Hangry"	May 18
Afternoon Delight	One News	100th	"100th Episode"	June 4
Linlang: The Teleserye Version	A2Z / Jeepney TV / Kapamilya Channel / TV5	100th	"Binaligtad"	June 11
Face 2 Face	TV5 / One PH	300th	"Pag-ibig ko Ipaglalaban ko"	June 17
Family Feud (4th incarnation)	GMA	500th	"Olympians"	June 18
Oh No! It's B.O. (Biro Only)!	Net 25	100th	"100th Episode"	July 6
Asawa ng Asawa Ko	GMA / GTV / Pinoy Hits	100th	"Backfire"	July 8
ASAP Natin 'To	A2Z / Jeepney TV / Kapamilya Channel / TV5	9,700th	"Your Vibe"	July 14
TiktoClock	GMA / GTV	500th	"500th Episode"	July 18
Lilet Matias: Attorney-at-Law	GMA / Pinoy Hits	100th	"Bala ni Patricia"	July 24
It's Showtime	A2Z / All TV / GMA / GTV / Kapamilya Channel	4,100th	"Oh Gusto ko Showtime"	August 6
Abot-Kamay na Pangarap	GMA / Pinoy Hits	600th	"May Pagseselosan"	August 12
Fast Talk with Boy Abunda	GMA / Pinoy Hits	400th	"Alma Concepcion and Maricel Morales"	August 12
Gud Morning Kapatid	TV5	300th	"300th Episode"	August 13
FPJ's Batang Quiapo	A2Z / Kapamilya Channel / TV5	400th	"Bagong Bahay"	August 29
Lumuhod Ka Sa Lupa	TV5 / Sari-Sari Channel	100th	"Hinala"	August 30
Dapat Alam Mo!	GTV	800th	"800th Episode"	September 24
Afternoon Delight	One News	200th	"200th Episode"	October 22
Pamilya Sagrado	A2Z / Jeepney TV / Kapamilya Channel / TV5	100th	"Ganti"	November 1
Family Feud (4th incarnation)	GMA	600th	"The Clash"	November 5
Widows' War	GMA / GTV	100th	"Barry Revealed"	November 15
It's Showtime	A2Z / All TV / GMA / GTV / Kapamilya Channel	4,200th	"Pinakamasaya"	November 30
Wil To Win	TV5 / BuKo Channel / One PH / Sari-Sari Channel	100th	"100th Episode"	December 2
Lilet Matias: Attorney-at-Law	GMA	200th	"Away Pamilya"	December 3
TiktoClock	GMA	600th	"600th Episode"	December 5
The Boobay and Tekla Show: Tawa is Life	GMA	300th	"Happy Holidays"	December 8
Pulang Araw	GMA / GTV	100th	"Unexpected"	December 13
Farm to Table	GTV	200th	"200th Episode"	December 15
Asawa ng Asawa Ko	GMA / GTV	200th	"Sibling Ties"	December 30
Fast Talk with Boy Abunda	GMA	500th	"Fast Talk Awards 2024 and AiAi Delas Alas"	December 30
Gud Morning Kapatid	TV5 / RPTV	400th	"400th Episode"	December 31

== Finales ==
=== Major networks ===
==== A2Z ====
The following are programs that ended on A2Z:

- January 11: Fractured
- January 12: Superbook (1981)
- January 18: Senior High
- January 20: Click, Like, Share (seasons 2 and 3; rerun)
- January 26: Nag-aapoy na Damdamin
- January 27: Pira-Pirasong Paraiso
- February 1: Zoomers (season 1)
- February 11: Everybody, Sing! (season 3)
- February 24: Tomorrow's World
- April 19: F4 Thailand: Boys Over Flowers (rerun)
- April 28: Come and Hug Me (rerun)
- May 10: Can't Buy Me Love
- May 18: Mr. Bean
- May 19: The Voice Teens (season 3)
- May 24: Monarch
- May 31: Superbook Reimagined (season 4)
- June 14: Linlang: The Teleserye Version
- June 16: Goin' Bulilit (seasons 1–5)
- June 28: 2gether: The Series and Minute to Win It: Last Man Standing (seasons 1 and 2)
- June 30: Ipaglaban Mo!
- July 12: Zoomers (season 2)
- July 14: I Can See Your Voice (season 5) and What's Wrong with Secretary Kim (Philippine adaptation)
- July 19: Star Hunt: The Audition Show
- July 26: Mars Ravelo's Darna (2022; rerun)
- July 27: Dirty Linen (rerun)
- August 4: Count Your Lucky Stars (rerun)
- August 30: High Street
- September 8: Still 2gether
- October 13: Tara, G! (rerun)
- October 26: Pinoy Big Brother: Gen 11
- November 9: Super Inggo (Kidz Weekend)
- November 15: Pamilya Sagrado
- November 24: The Forbidden Flower (rerun)

===== Stopped airing =====
Program	Last airing	Resumed airing	Reason
Goin' Bulilit (season 9)	September 29	March 10, 2025	Season break and temporarily replaced by the reruns of the fifth season of Kapamilya, Deal or No Deal.
Team Yey!	November 10	November 24	Pre-empted by the Miss Universe 2024.
Wansapanataym	November 10	November 24	Pre-empted by the Miss Universe 2024.
Jesus the Healer	November 16	November 30	Pre-empted by the JIL 46th Year: Christ is the Answer.
Mega Blockbusters (A2Z Zinema)	December 8	December 21	Pre-empted by the 2-part special of Shine Kapamilya Tulong-Tulong Ngayong Pasko: The ABS-CBN Christmas Special 2024.

==== GMA ====
The following are programs that ended on GMA Network:

- January 5: Eat Bulaga!, I Can See You (season 2; rerun) and The Deadly Affair
- January 11: Lovers & Liars
- January 12: Wolfblood (season 2; rerun)
- January 13: Daig Kayo ng Lola Ko (season 2)
- January 25: Queen of Masks
- January 26: At Home with GMA Regional TV, GMA Regional TV Early Edition, GMA Regional TV Live! and Mornings with GMA Regional TV
- January 28: Sparkle U
- February 11: Where's Chicky?
- February 16: Dong Yi (rerun)
- February 17: Oggy and the Cockroaches
- February 23: The Long Ballad
- March 1: She and Her Perfect Husband and Stolen Life
- March 7: Tahanang Pinakamasaya
- March 15: Romantic Deception
- March 22: GameKeepers
- March 23: Jose & Maria's Bonggang Villa (season 2)
- March 27: Jinxed at First and Love. Die. Repeat.
- April 5: Lunchtime Movie Hits
- April 6: Kamen Rider Zero-One
- April 12: The Unlisted
- April 19: Secret Affair
- May 3: Makiling and Yumi's Cells
- May 4: Daig Kayo ng Lola Ko (season 3)
- May 5: Walang Matigas na Pulis sa Matinik na Misis (season 2)
- May 10: Bleach (seasons 2 and 3; rerun) and Miracle of Love
- May 24: Kokdu: Season of Deity and Third Rail
- May 25: Open 24/7
- May 26: Recipes of Love and The New Legends of Monkey (rerun)
- June 7: Queen of the Ring and Rewriting Destiny
- June 8: Angry Birds Blues (rerun)
- June 15: Jujutsu Kaisen (season 1)
- June 28: My Guardian Alien
- July 10: Superhero Academy
- July 19: Shooting Stars and Spy × Family
- July 26: Black Rider and Eclipse of the Heart
- July 27: Pinoy Crime Stories
- July 28: Si Manoy Ang Ninong Ko
- August 2: To the Moon and Back
- August 14: The Girl He Never Noticed
- August 23: Kiss Goblin
- August 30: Balitang Bicolandia (GMA Bicol), Balitang Southern Tagalog (GMA Batangas) and Dr. Tang
- September 6: Parallel World and Voltes V: Legacy (rerun)
- September 8: Running Man Philippines (season 2)
- September 13: Curtain Call
- September 14: Biyahe ni Drew
- September 15: Dino Dana
- September 22: Ok Ako
- September 27: Tokyo Revengers
- September 28: DreamWorks Dragons: Rescue Riders and Sarap, 'Di Ba?
- October 11: The Betrayal
- October 19: Abot-Kamay na Pangarap, Daig Kayo ng Lola Ko (season 4) and Trolls: TrollsTopia
- October 20: GameKeepers (rerun) and Sunny Bunnies
- October 25: The Girl Who Sees Smells
- October 27: My Mother, My Story
- November 1: The Heavenly Idol
- November 8: Doctor Detective
- November 29: Snow Eagle Lord
- December 6: Endless Love (Thai version)
- December 14: Maka (season 1), Piggy Tales (rerun) and The Clash (season 6)
- December 15: The Voice Kids (season 6)
- December 27: Pulang Araw
- December 29: Home Base Plus (season 25)
- December 31: Power Rangers: Beast Morphers

===== Stopped airing =====
Program	Last airing	Resumed airing	Reason
Kapuso Primetime Cinema (weeknight edition)	January 12	December 30	Programming break.
Home Base Plus (season 24)	January 14	August 11 (GTV)	Season break.
Lilet Matias: Attorney-at-Law	July 19	July 23	Pre-empted by the GMA Integrated News special coverage of the 3rd State of the Nation Address.
Fast Talk with Boy Abunda	July 19	July 23	Pre-empted by the GMA Integrated News special coverage of the 3rd State of the Nation Address.
Voltes V: Legacy (rerun)	July 19	July 23	Pre-empted by the GMA Integrated News special coverage of the 3rd State of the Nation Address.
Eclipse of the Heart	July 19	July 23	Pre-empted by the GMA Integrated News special coverage of the 3rd State of the Nation Address.
Amazing Earth	October 4	October 18	Pre-empted by the concert of Julie X Stell: Ang Ating Tinig.
GMA Blockbusters	November 24	December 8	Pre-empted by the 100th season of National Collegiate Athletic Association.
Regal Studio Presents	November 24	December 8	Pre-empted by the 100th season of National Collegiate Athletic Association.
Daig Kayo ng Lola Ko (season 5)	December 21	January 4, 2025	Pre-empted by the 2024: The GMA Integrated News Year-End Report.
Stealer: The Treasure Keeper	December 27	January 6, 2025	Programming break.
Flames of Vengeance	December 30	January 1, 2025	Pre-empted by the Kapuso Countdown to 2025: Isa sa Puso.

==== TV5 ====
The following are programs that ended on TV5:

- January 5: E.A.T.
- January 12: Fractured and Revolutionary Love
- January 13: Cine Cinco Classics
- January 19: Senior High
- January 26: Nag-aapoy na Damdamin
- January 27: Pira-Pirasong Paraiso
- January 31: The Game
- February 2: Zoomers (season 1)
- February 10: Cine Cinco K-Hits
- February 11: Everybody, Sing! (season 3)
- February 20: Celebrity Samurai (rerun) and Niña Niño (rerun)
- March 1: Magandang Buhay
- March 9: Demolition Job (rerun) and Gus Abelgas Forensics (season 1)
- March 16: Cine Cinco: Sabado Hits
- March 17: Cine Spotlight
- March 22: Diary of a Prosecutor
- March 23: Cine Cinco: Sabado Nights
- March 24: Britain's Got Talent (series 16)
- March 31: TikTalks (season 2)
- April 5: Wanted sa Radyo
- April 19: F4 Thailand: Boys Over Flowers
- April 28: My Little Pony: Friendship Is Magic and Transformers: Cyberverse
- May 3: Ted Failon at DJ Chacha sa Radyo5
- May 5: Jack and Jill sa Diamond Hills
- May 10: Can't Buy Me Love
- May 11: Emojination (seasons 1-4)
- May 19: The Voice Teens (season 3)
- May 24: Monarch
- June 14: Linlang: The Teleserye Version
- June 28: 2gether: The Series and Barangay Singko Panalo
- July 12: Zoomers (season 2)
- July 14: I Can See Your Voice (season 5), Jurassic World Camp Cretaceous, The Rain In España (rerun) and What's Wrong with Secretary Kim (Philippine adaptation)
- July 19: Parientes a la fuerza and Star Hunt: The Audition Show
- August 9: Catch the Ghost
- August 30: High Street
- September 27: Bluey, Gabby's Dollhouse, Padyak Princess and Wanted: Ang Serye (rerun)
- October 18: Cine Cinco Hits, and Face 2 Face (2nd Incarnation)
- October 20: Budol Alert, Cine Cinco: Weekend Hits and Sunday Blockbusters
- October 25: Starting Lineup
- October 26: Gus Abelgas Forensics (season 2), Kaya (rerun), Pinoy Big Brother: Gen 11, Wow Mali: Doble Tama and Wow Mali: Doble Tawa
- November 3: Kagat ng Dilim (2020; rerun)
- November 8: Cine Cinco Hollywood
- November 15: Pamilya Sagrado
- December 13: Stay-In Love (rerun)

===== Stopped airing =====
Program	Last airing	Resumed airing	Reason
Wow Mali: Doble Tawa	March 8	July 20	Season break.
Starting Lineup	June 7	July 22	The 11:30 p.m. timeslot was temporary occupied by Parientes a la fuerza for the remaining episodes until it concluded on July 19.
Lumuhod Ka Sa Lupa	June 14	June 24	Season break.
Kapatid Mo, Idol Raffy Tulfo	June 30	July 21	Pre-empted by the Seryosong Usapan: Revillame Faces the Journos and Wil to Win: WILcome Back Party Special.
Cine Cinco Hits	July 19	July 23	Pre-empted by the News5 special coverage of the SONA 2024: Ulat ng Pangulo.
Wil To Win	July 19	July 23	Pre-empted by the News5 special coverage of the SONA 2024: Ulat ng Pangulo.
Pinoy Explorer (rerun)	September 15	February 16, 2025	Programming break.
Word of God Network	October 12	October 19	Programming break due to the pre-occupied timeslots on weekday mornings until it resumed on January 6, 2025 after subsequently transposed from every Saturdays.
Frontline sa Umaga	October 18, 2024	August 10, 2026	Program used as a segment on Gud Morning Kapatid.
American Idol (season 22)	November 10	November 24	Pre-empted by the television special for Defying Gravity: The Curtain Rises on Wicked.
Fast & Furious Spy Racers	November 16	November 23	Pre-empted by the television special for Defying Gravity: The Curtain Rises on Wicked.
Da Pers Family	December 8	December 29	Pre-empted by the 2-part special of Merry ang Vibes ng Pasko: The MVP Group Christmas Party

=== State-owned networks ===
==== PTV ====
The following are programs that ended on People's Television Network:

- January 1: On Assignment (season 1)
- February 10: Abogado ng Bayan
- April 13: Lakbayin ang Magandang Pilipinas and Serbisyo Muna
- June 1: Expertalk (season 3)
- July 27: Asenso KaPinoy
- August 16: Pinoy Pawnstars
- August 18: RDR Talks
- September 1: Unity League
- September 11: Malacañang Insider
- September 22: Entrepinas TV
- October 13: Word of God Network
- November 14: Young Guns on the Move
- December 15: Lakbay Tugon: Presidential Help Desk
- December 28: Expertalk (season 4)
- December 30: PCSO Lottery Draw

==== IBC ====
The following are programs that ended on IBC:

- January 28: Feast TV
- January 31: Bitag Live
- March 10: Ang Alamat ng Silk Road: Ang Larawan ng Dagat
- May 29: Handa Sakuna
- July 13: Ate Rose: Real Life Stories
- July 14: Ito Ang Kongreso
- September 1: Unity League
- September 6: Malacañang Insider
- September 29: Sentro Balita Weekend and Ulat Bayan Weekend
- September 30: Bagong Pilipinas Ngayon and Sentro Balita

===== Stopped airing =====
Program	Last airing	Resumed airing	Reason
Dok True Ba?	May 4	September 28	Season break.

=== Minor networks ===
The following are programs that ended on minor networks:

- January 5: My Bargain Queen on Net 25
- January 7: Quizon CT on Net 25
- January 13: Anong Meron kay Abok? on Net 25
- January 21: GoodWill (season 3) on Net 25
- January 27: Mag-Usap Tayo on Aliw 23
- January 31: Bitag Live on CLTV 36
- February 2: Hataw Balita Pilipinas and UNTV News Worldwide on UNTV
- February 4: Bahay Pinoy, Buhay Pinoy on Aliw 23
- February 23: If You Wish Upon Me (rerun) and Why Her? (rerun) on All TV
- February 25: Till I Met You (rerun) on All TV
- February 25: Gawin ang Tama on Aliw 23
- March 1: Tandem: Drew at Jon on Aliw 23
- March 17: Magpuri TV on Light TV
- March 22: Woori the Virgin (rerun) on All TV
- March 24: Miffy's Adventures Big and Small, Sunny Girl No. 23 and Transformers: Rescue Bots on Net 25
- March 28: Life Giver on Light TV
- March 29: Unwanted Family on Net 25
- March 31: NBI: Naku, Bawal Ito and Raket on Aliw 23
- April 5: Daydreamer on Net 25
- April 12: All TV News Break, AllFlix Pinoy Picks and From Now On, Showtime! (rerun) on All TV
- April 13: John en Ellen on All TV
- April 14: Let's Prove It! on Aliw 23
- April 14: AllFlix Prime, Asintado, Kuha All!, Ngayon at Kailanman (2018; rerun) and Sana Dalawa ang Puso (rerun) on All TV
- April 19: Pasion de Amor (2015) on All TV
- April 26: Miracle (rerun) on All TV
- May 5: Dahil May Isang Ikaw on All TV
- May 10: Bagani, Habang May Buhay (2010), Precious Hearts Romances Presents: Lumayo Ka Man sa Akin and Walang Iwanan on All TV
- May 11: Home Along Da Riles, Palibhasa Lalake, Pamilya Talk with Tita Jing and Proyekto Pilipino on All TV
- May 12: Celebrity Playtime, Dahil sa Pag-ibig (2012) and Nasaan Ka Nang Kailangan Kita on All TV
- May 17: My Little Juan on All TV
- May 24: Again My Life (rerun) on All TV
- May 26: Konnichiwa Manila on All TV
- June 2: Komiks Presents: Wakasan on All TV
- June 7: Komiks: Da Adventures of Pedro Penduko and Oh My G! on All TV
- June 14: AllFlix Noon Flix, Be My Lady and Komiks: Pedro Penduko at ang Mga Engkantao on All TV
- June 15: AllFlix Sabado Hits on All TV
- June 15: Obet P. sa IZ on Aliw 23
- June 28: Minute to Win It: Last Man Standing (season 2) on All TV
- July 5: If You Wish Upon Me (rerun) on All TV
- July 6: Kampanerang Kuba on All TV
- July 19: House of Bluebird on Net 25
- July 26: Budoy on All TV
- July 26: One Litre of Tears on Net 25
- July 31: Why News on UNTV
- August 5: SCWC Konek on Aliw 23
- August 14: Newswatch Plus Conversations on Aliw 23
- August 16: From Now On!, Showtime! (rerun) on All TV
- August 18: Benrat on Net 25
- August 23: Langit Lupa on All TV
- August 25: Sana Maulit Muli on All TV
- August 25: GoodWill (season 4) on Net 25
- September 1: IZ Game Time and Manila Cathedral Sunday Mass on Aliw 23
- September 1: Komiks Presents: Tiny Tony on All TV
- September 6: Why Her? (rerun) on All TV
- September 7: Love in 40 Days on All TV
- September 8: Volta on All TV
- September 20: Hello, My Shining Love on Net 25
- September 25: Counterpoint with Secretary Salvador Panelo (3rd incarnation) on Net 25
- September 27: Tubig at Langis on All TV
- September 28: Reality Check on Net 25
- September 29: The Financial District on Aliw 23
- September 29: AllFlix Linggo Hits on All TV
- October 6: Viral Scandal on All TV
- October 17: Bagong Barangay ng Mamamayan in Action on Aliw 23
- October 18: Krystala and River Where the Moon Rises (rerun) on All TV
- October 19: Marites University on All TV
- October 25: Momay and Rubi (2010) on All TV
- November 1: Miracle (rerun) on All TV
- November 3: Wako Wako on All TV
- November 15: May Bukas Pa (2009) on All TV
- November 15: Oath of Love on Net 25
- November 24: Kahit Isang Saglit on All TV
- November 29: On the Wings of Love and Woori the Virgin (rerun) on All TV
- December 6: Botika ni Tita on Aliw 23
- December 6: Forevermore on All TV
- December 7: Dyesebel (2014) on All TV
- December 8: Basta Enerhiya, Sagot Kita! (season 1) and Paano Kita Mapasasalamatan? on All TV
- December 21: Maalaala Mo Kaya on All TV
- December 22: Ipaglaban Mo! and KBYN: Kaagapay ng Bayan on All TV
- December 27: Inday Bote and Magkaribal on All TV
- December 28: Beyond Wellness with Ms. P on Aliw 23
- December 29: Department of Help on Aliw 23

==== Stopped airing ====
Program	Channel	Last airing	Resumed airing	Reason
M.O.M.S — Mhies on a Mission	All TV	April 12	October 6	Season break.
Goin' Bulilit (season 9)	All TV	September 29	March 10, 2025	Season break and temporarily replaced by the reruns of the fifth season of Kapamilya, Deal or No Deal.

=== Other channels ===
The following are programs that ended on other channels:

- January 5: E.A.T. on BuKo Channel
- January 5: Gokusen (season 2) and My Shy Boss on Heart of Asia
- January 5: I Can See You (season 2) on Pinoy Hits
- January 7: Innocent Defendant (rerun) on Heart of Asia
- January 11: Lovers & Liars on GTV and Pinoy Hits
- January 12: Lokomoko U on BuKo Channel
- January 12: Princess Charming on Heart of Asia
- January 12: Fractured and Superbook (1981) on Kapamilya Channel
- January 12: Kapuso Primetime Cinema (weeknight edition) on Pinoy Hits
- January 13: Eat Bulaga! on BuKo Channel
- January 13: Angel's Last Mission (rerun) and VIP (rerun) on Heart of Asia
- January 13: Daig Kayo ng Lola Ko (season 2) on Pinoy Hits
- January 19: Kokey (rerun), Kung Fu Kids (rerun) and Senior High on Jeepney TV
- January 19: Kokey and Senior High on Kapamilya Channel
- January 19: Kakambal ni Eliana (rerun) on Pinoy Hits
- January 19: Crown of Tears on Telenovela Channel
- January 20: Sahaya on Pinoy Hits
- January 21: Ultraman R/B on GTV
- January 21: Click, Like, Share (seasons 2 and 3; rerun) on Kapamilya Channel
- January 22: Usapang Bilyonaryo on CNN Philippines
- January 23: MedTalk Health Talk on CNN Philippines
- January 24: Politics as Usual on CNN Philippines
- January 25: Batas et Al on CNN Philippines
- January 26: Anderson Cooper 360°, Balitaan, CNN Philippines 10, News Night, Newsroom Ngayon, Sports Desk, The Exchange with Rico Hizon, The Final Word with Rico Hizon, The Source with Pinky Webb, The Story of the Filipino, Traffic Center and Wholesome Meals, Better Life on CNN Philippines
- January 26: The Heirs (rerun) on Heart of Asia
- January 26: Nag-aapoy na Damdamin on Kapamilya Channel
- January 26: Mar de amor on Telenovela Channel
- January 27: Building Bridges, Eat Bulaga! and One Smart Act on CNN Philippines
- January 27: Pira-Pirasong Paraiso on Kapamilya Channel
- January 27: Sirkus on Pinoy Hits
- January 28: Get Fit, Hollywood Express, Newsroom Weekend, Siyensikat (season 4), The Art of Movement, The World is Yours and Updates on CNN Philippines
- January 28: Dragon Ball Z and Sparkle U on GTV
- January 28: Sparkle U on Pinoy Hits
- January 29: Amanpour, New Day and This is Life with Lisa Ling on CNN Philippines
- January 31: The Game on One News, One Sports and One Sports+
- February 1: Martin Mystery (rerun) on GTV
- February 2: Gokusen (season 3; rerun) and The Penthouse (season 3; rerun) on Heart of Asia
- February 2: Little Champ (rerun) and Muling Buksan ang Puso (rerun) on Jeepney TV
- February 2: Zoomers (season 1) on Kapamilya Channel
- February 3: Legend of the Blue Sea (rerun) on Heart of Asia
- February 3: Qpids on Jeepney TV
- February 4: Angry Birds Toons on GTV
- February 4: Legend of Fuyao (rerun) on Heart of Asia
- February 9: Bangon na, Bayan! (Dobol B TV) and My Husband in Law on GTV
- February 9: Juan Happy Love Story on Heart of Asia
- February 10: Demolition Job on RPTV
- February 11: Everybody, Sing! (season 3) on Kapamilya Channel
- February 16: Beauty Boy and Hogu's Love on Heart of Asia
- February 16: Walang Hanggang Paalam (rerun) on Jeepney TV
- February 16: Dading (rerun) on Pinoy Hits
- February 17: From the Heart Specials: Pumpkin Time on Heart of Asia
- February 17: Gus Abelgas Forensics (season 1) on RPTV
- February 23: Another Miss Oh and Are We Alright? on Heart of Asia
- February 23: The Greatest Love (rerun) on Jeepney TV
- February 25: FPJ: Hari ng Aksyon on Cine Mo!
- February 25: About Time (rerun) on Heart of Asia
- February 29: Whattamen on Cine Mo!
- February 29: Love to Death (rerun), Road to Destiny (rerun), Sortilegio (rerun) and Wild Lands (rerun) on Telenovela Channel
- March 1: MBC Network News on DZRH TV
- March 1: Aryana (rerun) and Saan Ka Man Naroroon on Jeepney TV
- March 1: Stolen Life on Pinoy Hits
- March 1: BalitaOnenan! on RPTV
- March 2: The Good Son (rerun) on Jeepney TV
- March 3: Flame of Recca and Meteo Heroes on GTV
- March 3: Hollywood Blockbusters and Tropa Mo Ko Unli on RPTV
- March 8: Poong, the Joseon Psychiatrist (season 1) on Heart of Asia
- March 9: Gus Abelgas Forensics (season 1) on One PH
- March 9: Bayan Ko on Pinoy Hits
- March 10: Family TV Mass on One Sports
- March 10: Hawak Kamay (rerun) on Jeepney TV
- March 13: Dugong Buhay on Cine Mo!
- March 15: Angelito: Ang Bagong Yugto (rerun) on Jeepney TV
- March 16: Brigada on GTV and Pinoy Hits
- March 22: Love You Two on Pinoy Hits
- March 23: Scripting Your Destiny (rerun) on Heart of Asia
- March 23: Jose & Maria's Bonggang Villa (season 2) on Pinoy Hits
- March 24: Extraordinary You (rerun) on Heart of Asia
- March 24: And I Love You So (rerun) on Jeepney TV
- March 27: Love. Die. Repeat. on GTV and Pinoy Hits
- March 27: Ted Failon at DJ Chacha sa Radyo5 on One News
- March 27: Building Bridges and The Story of the Filipino on RPTV
- March 31: Resibo: Walang Lusot ang May Atraso on GTV
- March 31: Mr. Merman (rerun) on Heart of Asia
- March 31: TikTalks (season 2) on One News and One PH
- April 5: It's Showtime, Kokey @ Ako (rerun) and My Super D (rerun) on Jeepney TV
- April 5: Kokey @ Ako on Kapamilya Channel
- April 5: The Big Story on One PH
- April 6: Jewel in the Palace on GTV
- April 12: Delayed Justice, Girl Next Room, Mr. Queen (rerun) and Poong, the Joseon Psychiatrist (season 2) on Heart of Asia
- April 12: Ang sa Iyo ay Akin (rerun) on Jeepney TV
- April 13: Bubu and the Little Owls, Dinoman, Mr. Bean, Pasada Pelikula, Ryan Ryan Musikahan, Super Inggo (rerun) and Team Yey! (season 5) on Jeepney TV
- April 14: Kapamilya Journeys of Hope, Kapamilya Sunday Mass and Kid Sine Presents on Jeepney TV
- April 19: Ancient Love Poetry and Code Name: Yong Pal (rerun) on Heart of Asia
- April 19: Apoy sa Dagat (rerun) on Jeepney TV
- April 19: F4 Thailand: Boys Over Flowers (rerun) on Kapamilya Channel
- April 20: The Leaves on Heart of Asia
- April 21: Queen and I (rerun) on Heart of Asia
- April 26: Man of Vengeance (rerun) on Heart of Asia
- April 26: Touching You on Hallypop
- April 26: TODA One I Love on Pinoy Hits
- April 27: Ka-Vendor on DZRH TV
- April 27: The Millionaire's Wife on Pinoy Hits
- April 28: The Endlings and Ultraman Taiga on GTV
- April 28: Bubble Up and Romance of Dog & Monkey on Hallypop
- April 28: Come and Hug Me (rerun) on Kapamilya Channel
- May 3: Makiling on Pinoy Hits
- May 4: Alamin na This on DZRH TV
- May 4: Love in the Moonlight (rerun) on Heart of Asia
- May 4: Magpakailanman on GTV
- May 4: Daig Kayo ng Lola Ko (season 3) on Pinoy Hits
- May 5: Jack and Jill sa Diamond Hills on BuKo Channel
- May 5: Angry Birds Stella (rerun) and Negosyo Goals (season 3) on GTV
- May 5: Dahil May Isang Ikaw (rerun) on Jeepney TV
- May 5: Walang Matigas na Pulis sa Matinik na Misis (season 2) on Pinoy Hits
- May 10: Mulawin vs. Ravena on Heart of Asia
- May 10: Asintado, Bagani (rerun), Can't Buy Me Love, Precious Hearts Romances Presents: Lumayo Ka Man sa Akin (rerun), Precious Hearts Romances Presents: Somewhere in My Heart (rerun) and Walang Iwanan (rerun) on Jeepney TV
- May 10: Can't Buy Me Love on Kapamilya Channel
- May 10: Bangon Bayan with Mon on One PH
- May 10: Munting Heredera on Pinoy Hits
- May 11: Princess Hours (rerun) on Heart of Asia
- May 11: Home Along Da Riles (rerun), Over A Glass or Two, Palibhasa Lalake (rerun), Pamilya Talk with Tita Jing and Proyekto Pilipino on Jeepney TV
- May 12: Emojination (seasons 1–4) on BuKo Channel
- May 12: Eve on GTV
- May 12: Best 10 Bets and Celebrity Playtime (rerun) on Jeepney TV
- May 17: My Little Juan (rerun) on Jeepney TV
- May 18: Mr. Bean on Kapamilya Channel
- May 19: My Ambulance (rerun) on Heart of Asia
- May 19: The Voice Teens (season 3) on Kapamilya Channel
- May 23: Adarna (rerun) on Pinoy Hits
- May 24: Signal (rerun) on Heart of Asia
- May 24: Monarch on Kapamilya Channel
- May 24: Rhodora X (rerun) on Pinoy Hits
- May 25: Titser on Pinoy Hits
- May 31: Regional TV News on GTV and Pinoy Hits
- May 31: Banana Actually and The Ordinary Life of Ms. O on Hallypop
- May 31: Bai Ling Tan on Heart of Asia
- May 31: Superbook Reimagined (season 4) on Kapamilya Channel
- May 31: Get Fit and MedTalk Health Talk on RPTV
- June 1: Show Window: The Queen's House (rerun) on Heart of Asia
- June 2: Komiks Presents: Wakasan (rerun) on Jeepney TV
- June 7: 1 for 3 on BuKo Channel
- June 7: Game of Affection (rerun) and Goblin on Heart of Asia
- June 7: Komiks: Da Adventures of Pedro Penduko (rerun) and Oh My G! (rerun) on Jeepney TV
- June 7: Komiks: Da Adventures of Pedro Penduko on Kapamilya Channel
- June 8: Celebrity Samurai (rerun) on BuKo Channel
- June 8: Art of the Spirit (rerun) and The Witch's Diner (rerun) on Heart of Asia
- June 9: Mako Mermaids (rerun) on GTV
- June 14: I Hear Your Voice (rerun) and Kingmaker: The Change of Destiny on Heart of Asia
- June 14: Be My Lady (rerun) and Linlang: The Teleserye Version on Jeepney TV
- June 14: Linlang: The Teleserye Version on Kapamilya Channel
- June 16: Playful Kiss (rerun) on Heart of Asia
- June 21: Bad Romeo and Room No. 9 on Heart of Asia
- June 21: Habang May Buhay (2010; rerun) on Jeepney TV
- June 24: The Huddle on RPTV
- June 27: Jumpball on RPTV
- June 28: My Guardian Alien on GTV and Pinoy Hits
- June 28: Deux Yeoza on Hallypop
- June 28: Queen Seondeok on Heart of Asia
- June 28: 2gether: The Series (rerun) and Minute to Win It: Last Man Standing (seasons 1 and 2) on Kapamilya Channel
- June 28: Kasalo, Pasada, Pintig ng Bayan, SKL: Share Ko Lang, TeleRadyo Serbisyo & Radyo 630 Special Coverage and TeleRadyo Serbisyo Newsbreak on Prime TV (now PRTV Prime Media) and TeleRadyo Serbisyo
- June 30: Ipaglaban Mo! on Kapamilya Channel
- July 5: The Heirs on GTV
- July 5: My Roommate is a Gumiho on Heart of Asia
- July 5: The Half Sisters and The Lost Recipe on Pinoy Hits
- July 6: Kampanerang Kuba (rerun) on Jeepney TV
- July 7: Jackie Chan Adventures (rerun) on GTV
- July 12: Leya, ang Pinakamagandang Babae sa Ilalim ng Lupa (rerun) on BuKo Channel
- July 12: Precious Hearts Romances Presents: Pintada (rerun) on Jeepney TV
- July 12: Zoomers (season 2) on Kapamilya Channel
- July 12: Batas et Al (2023 original version) on RPTV
- July 13: Her Bucket List on Heart of Asia
- July 14: Angry Birds Toons (rerun) on GTV
- July 14: The Frog Prince (rerun) on Heart of Asia
- July 14: Timeless Telesine on I Heart Movies
- July 14: I Can See Your Voice (season 5) and What's Wrong with Secretary Kim (Philippine adaptation) on Kapamilya Channel
- July 19: Pwedeng Pwede on Cine Mo!
- July 19: Tale of the Nine Tailed (rerun) on Heart of Asia
- July 19: Komiks: Pedro Penduko at ang Mga Engkantao (rerun), Ningning (rerun) and Pasion de Amor (2015; rerun) on Jeepney TV
- July 19: Komiks: Pedro Penduko at ang Mga Engkantao and Star Hunt: The Audition Show on Kapamilya Channel
- July 19: GG: Good Game on True FM TV (now True TV)
- July 21: Hotseat on RPTV
- July 26: Abot-Kamay na Pangarap and Black Rider on GTV
- July 26: The Sensible Life of Director Shin on Hallypop
- July 26: Jirisan and Now, We Are Breaking Up on Heart of Asia
- July 26: Budoy (rerun) on Jeepney TV
- July 26: Mars Ravelo's Darna (2022; rerun) on Kapamilya Channel
- July 26: Black Rider on Pinoy Hits
- July 26: In Between (rerun; ETCerye) on SolarFlix
- July 27: Kung Ako'y Iiwan Mo (rerun) on Jeepney TV
- July 27: Dirty Linen (rerun) on Kapamilya Channel
- July 27: Pinoy Crime Stories on Pinoy Hits
- August 2: Yeojeong's Journey on Hallypop
- August 3: The Red Sleeve (rerun) on Heart of Asia
- August 4: One the Woman (rerun) on Heart of Asia
- August 4: Count Your Lucky Stars (rerun) on Kapamilya Channel
- August 9: Detective Conan (season 9) on GTV
- August 9: An Oriental Odyssey and Tomorrow's Cantabile on Heart of Asia
- August 11: Daimos on GTV
- August 11: Doctor John (rerun) and To Me, It's Simply You (rerun) on Heart of Asia
- August 11: Pinoy in Paris on RPTV
- August 16: Huwag Ka Lang Mawawala (rerun) on Jeepney TV
- August 17: Dino Dan and Simba: The King Lion on Heart of Asia
- August 17: Katipunan on Pinoy Hits
- August 18: Huntahan on DZRH TV
- August 18: Home Base Plus (season 24) on GTV
- August 23: 72 Seconds on Hallypop
- August 23: In Need of Romance 3 on Heart of Asia
- August 23: Langit Lupa (rerun) on Jeepney TV
- August 24: Revenge Note on Heart of Asia
- August 25: Flame of Recca (rerun) and Ultraman Z on GTV
- August 25: Sana Maulit Muli (rerun) on Jeepney TV
- August 30: The Penthouse (season 1) on GTV
- August 30: Man in the Shower on Hallypop
- August 30: High Street, Honesto (rerun) and Mutya (rerun) on Jeepney TV
- August 30: High Street on Kapamilya Channel
- August 30: Building Bridges (rerun) on RPTV
- September 1: A8 E-Sports on Hallypop
- September 1: Komiks Presents: Tiny Tony on Jeepney TV
- September 6: Game of Outlaws and Ghost Doctor (rerun) on Heart of Asia
- September 6: Fast Talk with Boy Abunda, Grazilda and Voltes V: Legacy (rerun) on Pinoy Hits
- September 6: Agenda ng Bayan on Radyo Pilipinas 1 Television
- September 7: Love in 40 Days (rerun) on Jeepney TV
- September 8: Running Man Philippines (season 2) on GTV and Pinoy Hits
- September 8: Volta on Jeepney TV
- September 8: Still 2gether (rerun) on Kapamilya Channel
- September 11: Malacañang Insider on Radyo Pilipinas 1 Television
- September 13: TiktoClock on GTV
- September 13: Bride of the Water God and Prophecy of Love (rerun) on Heart of Asia
- September 13: Amazing Earth and i-Witness on Pinoy Hits
- September 14: Alamat (rerun), Biyahe ni Drew, Dobol Weng sa Dobol B, Good News Kasama si Vicky Morales, iJuander, Karelasyon, Magpakailanman, Pepito Manaloto: Tuloy ang Kwento, Pera Paraan, Pinas Sarap, Pinoy M.D. sa Dobol B, Pop Talk (rerun), Pulang Araw, Reporter's Notebook, Sarap, 'Di Ba?, Super Balita sa Umaga, Tadhana, Taste Buddies, Telesine Presents and Wish Ko Lang! on Pinoy Hits
- September 15: Jungo Pinoy Presents on Hallypop
- September 15: Team Fitfil on Kapamilya Channel
- September 15: 24 Oras Weekend, Aha!, All-Out Sundays, Ang Mahiwagang Baul, Art Angel, Born to Be Wild, Bubble Gang, Day Off, Dear Uge, Farm to Table, iBilib, Ismol Family, Kapuso Mo, Jessica Soho, Telesine Presents, The Boobay and Tekla Show, The Key of David and Wagas on Pinoy Hits
- September 19: FanPick, Hallypop Fresh, Hallypop Hits, Hallypop Lokal, Hallystage, Innerview, Mr. Hashtag and StarGazeMuzik on Hallypop
- September 19: 24 Oras, Abot-Kamay na Pangarap, Asawa ng Asawa Ko, Balitanghali, Buena Familia (rerun), Dapat Alam Mo!, Daig Kayo ng Lola Ko, Encantadia (2016), GMA Integrated News Bulletin, Hiram na Alaala (rerun), Juan Happy Love Story, Katipunan (rerun), Lilet Matias: Attorney-at-Law, Little Nanay (rerun), Mulawin vs. Ravena, Mundo Mo'y Akin, Reel Time, Sahaya (rerun), Saksi, Saksi sa Dobol B, Sine Totoo, Unang Hirit and Widows' War on Pinoy Hits
- September 22: Backstreet Rookie (rerun) on Heart of Asia
- September 27: Padyak Princess on BuKo Channel
- September 27: The World of Fantasy on Heart of Asia
- September 27: Tubig at Langis (rerun) on Jeepney TV
- September 27: Starting Lineup on RPTV
- September 28: Tayong Dalawa on Cine Mo!
- September 28: The Penthouse (season 2) on GTV
- September 28: The Maid (rerun) and The Skywatcher (rerun) on Heart of Asia
- September 28: Stars on Stars on Jeepney TV
- September 29: The Financial District on DWIZ News TV
- September 29: General and I (rerun) on Heart of Asia
- September 29: FlordeLiza (rerun) on Jeepney TV
- September 29: Goin' Bulilit (season 9) on Kapamilya Channel
- September 30: Bora: Sons of the Beach on Cine Mo!
- September 30: The Story of the Filipino (rerun) on RPTV
- October 4: What's Wrong with Secretary Kim and You Are My Heartbeat on Heart of Asia
- October 4: Forbidden Fruit (ETCetye) on SolarFlix
- October 5: Headlines of the Day on Prime TV (now PRTV Prime Media) and TeleRadyo Serbisyo
- October 5: Hello Pagkain! on One PH
- October 6: Bleach (season 2) and The Unlisted on GTV
- October 6: Viral Scandal (rerun) on Jeepney TV
- October 11: Queen and I (rerun) on Heart of Asia
- October 11: Agimat: Ang Mga Alamat ni Ramon Revilla (rerun), E-Boy and Magkano ang Iyong Dangal? on Jeepney TV
- October 11: Agimat: Ang Mga Alamat ni Ramon Revilla on Kapamilya Channel
- October 13: Tara, G! (rerun) on Kapamilya Channel
- October 17: Bagong Barangay ng Mamamayan in Action on DWIZ News TV
- October 18: Jewel in the Palace and The Herbal Master (rerun) on Heart of Asia
- October 18: Krystala (rerun) and Precious Hearts Romances Presents: Impostor (rerun) on Jeepney TV
- October 18: Face 2 Face (2nd Incarnation) on One PH
- October 19: Diskarteng Megamilyonaryo on Bilyonaryo News Channel
- October 20: Gimik (rerun) on Jeepney TV
- October 25: Dapat Alam Mo! on GTV
- October 25: The Romantic Doctor 2 (rerun) on Heart of Asia
- October 25: Momay (rerun) and Rubi (2010; rerun) on Jeepney TV
- October 26: Wow Mali: Doble Tama on BuKo Channel
- October 26: Dahil sa Pag-ibig (2012; rerun) on Jeepney TV
- October 26: Pinoy Big Brother: Gen 11 on Kapamilya Channel
- October 27: Angry Birds Blues (rerun), Kamen Rider Zero-One and Oggy and the Cockroaches on GTV
- October 27: Chinese by Blood, Filipino by Heart (season 5) on One News
- October 29: Insight with April Lee-Tan on ANC
- October 31: Get Fit (rerun) on RPTV
- November 1: The Penthouse (season 3) on GTV
- November 1: Ted Failon at DJ Chacha sa Radyo5 on One PH
- November 1: MedTalk Health Talk (rerun) and Ted Failon at DJ Chacha sa Radyo5 on RPTV
- November 1: Bangon Bayan with Mon, Radyo5 Balita Pilipinas, Radyo5 News Update and Ted Failon at DJ Chacha sa Radyo5 on True FM TV (now True TV)
- November 2: The Merciless Judge (rerun) on Heart of Asia
- November 3: Wako Wako on Jeepney TV
- November 6: Private Time with Ara Mina on One News
- November 8: Da Body en da Guard on Cine Mo!
- November 8: Balitang Pambansa and Ulat Bayan on DWAN TV
- November 8: Doors on GTV
- November 8: Nabi, My Stepdarling on Heart of Asia
- November 9: Blacklist (rerun), Dino Dan and From the Heart Specials: Pumpkin Time (rerun) on Heart of Asia
- November 9: Super Inggo on Kapamilya Channel
- November 10: Business Matters (season 11) and Negosyo Goals (season 4) on GTV
- November 10: Business Matters (season 11) on Heart of Asia
- November 14: Young Guns on the Move on Congress TV
- November 15: 46 Days and Beauty Boy (rerun) on Heart of Asia
- November 15: May Bukas Pa (2009; rerun), Little Champ (rerun) and Pamilya Sagrado on Jeepney TV
- November 15: Pamilya Sagrado on Kapamilya Channel
- November 16: Puppy in my Pocket: Adventures in Pocketville on Heart of Asia
- November 22: Overthoughts Podcast on DWAN TV
- November 22: Dos Kumpanyeras on DZRH TV
- November 22: Bukas na Lang Kita Mamahalin (rerun) on Jeepney TV
- November 24: Kahit Isang Saglit (rerun) on Jeepney TV
- November 24: The Forbidden Flower (rerun) on Kapamilya Channel
- November 26: The Story of the Filipino (rerun) on RPTV
- November 29: ANC Headlines, ANC Rundown and Business Roadshow on ANC
- November 29: The Witch's Diner on GTV
- November 29: Moon of Desire and On the Wings of Love (rerun) on Jeepney TV
- November 30: ANC Headlines Weekend, ANC Conversation, ANC Rundown Weekend, Dateline Philippines Weekend, The World Tonight Weekend and Top Story Weekend on ANC
- December 1: Wolfblood (seasons 3–4) on GTV
- December 6: Jumong on Heart of Asia
- December 6: Forevermore (rerun) on Jeepney TV
- December 7: Dyesebel (2014; rerun) on Jeepney TV
- December 7: Gus Abelgas Forensics (seasons 2 and 3) on One PH
- December 8: Botika ni Tita on DWIZ News TV
- December 8: Boys Over Flowers (rerun), Moon Embracing the Sun (rerun) and Poong, the Joseon Psychiatrist (season 1; rerun) on Heart of Asia
- December 8: Paano Kita Mapasasalamatan? (rerun) on Jeepney TV
- December 13: Goblin on GTV
- December 13: Delayed Justice (rerun) and The Wolf (rerun) on Heart of Asia
- December 14: The Clash (season 6) on GTV
- December 15: I Heart PH (season 9) and The Voice Kids (season 6) on GTV
- December 20: Jewel in the Palace (rerun), Miracle of Love and Romantic Deception on Heart of Asia
- December 20: World NewsFeed on Bilyonaryo News Channel
- December 20: Maria Flordeluna (rerun) on Jeepney TV
- December 21: Maalaala Mo Kaya (rerun) on Jeepney TV
- December 22: Ipaglaban Mo! (rerun), KBYN: Kaagapay ng Bayan and Pangarap na Bituin (rerun) on Jeepney TV
- December 27: Pulang Araw on GTV
- December 27: My Name is Busaba on Heart of Asia
- December 27: Inday Bote (rerun) and Magkaribal (rerun) on Jeepney TV
- December 27: The B Side (season 1) on Cinema One
- December 28: Kwarto Kantos on Bilyonaryo News Channel
- December 28: Beyond Wellness with Ms. P on DWIZ News TV
- December 28: One Night Steal (rerun) on Heart of Asia
- December 29: The Huddle on One Sports
- December 30: Dwance Groove on DWAN TV
- December 31: It's Showtime and Siesta Fiesta Movies on GTV
- December 31: The Story of the Filipino (rerun) on RPTV

==== Unknown ====
- AT: Adulting in Tandem, Fight News Weekly, Global Pinoy Konek, Home EcoNanay, LGU Sports Center, Operation Lokal, Otro Cinco, PBS News Now, Serbisyo Pilipinas and Sports News Roundup on Radyo Pilipinas 1 Television

==== Stopped airing ====
Program	Channel	Last airing	Resumed airing	Reason
Sine Date Weekend	GTV	March 31	May 12	Pre-empted by the 99th season of National Collegiate Athletic Association.
Sine Date Weekend	GTV	September 1	December 1	Pre-empted by the 100th season of National Collegiate Athletic Association.
Afternoon Movie Break	GTV	April 6	May 11	Pre-empted by the 99th season of National Collegiate Athletic Association.
Afternoon Movie Break	GTV	September 1	November 30	Pre-empted by the 100th season of National Collegiate Athletic Association.
Saturday Cinema Hits	GTV	April 6	May 11	Pre-empted by the 99th season of National Collegiate Athletic Association.
Regal Treasures	GTV	April 8	May 13	Pre-empted by the 99th season of National Collegiate Athletic Association.
The Boobay and Tekla Show: Tawa is Life	GTV	May 5	December 22	Pre-empted by the second season of Running Man Philippines and the sixth season of The Voice Kids.
Wow Mali: Double Tawa	RPTV	July 21	August 19	Pre-empted by the 2024 Summer Olympics coverage.
Starting Lineup	RPTV	July 26	August 13	Pre-empted by the 2024 Summer Olympics coverage.
Barangay Singko Panalo	RPTV	September 2	February 2, 2025	Programming break.
Jujutsu Kaisen (season 1)	GTV	September 15	October 12	Programs replaced by Cinema G! (weekdays) and I Heart PH (every Sundays).
Goin' Bulilit (season 9)	Kapamilya Channel	September 29	March 10, 2025	Season break and temporarily replaced by the reruns of the fifth season of Kapamilya, Deal or No Deal.
Saturday Cinema Hits	GTV	October 5	October 19	Pre-empted by The Church of Jesus Christ of Latter-day Saints Conference.
Dinofroz (rerun)	GTV	October 6	October 20	Pre-empted by The Church of Jesus Christ of Latter-day Saints Conference.
Kamen Rider Zero-One	GTV	October 6	October 20	Pre-empted by The Church of Jesus Christ of Latter-day Saints Conference.
Martin Mystery (rerun)	GTV	October 6	October 20	Pre-empted by The Church of Jesus Christ of Latter-day Saints Conference.
Oggy and the Cockroaches	GTV	October 6	October 20	Pre-empted by The Church of Jesus Christ of Latter-day Saints Conference.
Wolfblood	GTV	October 6	October 20	Pre-empted by The Church of Jesus Christ of Latter-day Saints Conference.
Frontline sa Umaga	RPTV	October 18, 2024	August 10, 2026	Program used as a segment on Gud Morning Kapatid.
Mega Blockbusters	Kapamilya Channel	December 8	December 21	Pre-empted by the 2-part special of Shine Kapamilya Tulong-Tulong Ngayong Pasko: The ABS-CBN Christmas Special 2024
Daig Kayo ng Lola Ko (season 5)	GTV	December 21	January 4, 2025	Pre-empted by the 2024: The GMA Integrated News Year-End Report.
Tambayan sa Barangay 1206	DWAN TV	December 28	May 16, 2025	Programming break.

=== Video streaming services ===
- January 21: Safe Skies, Archer on Viva One
- February 2: Zoomers (season 1) on YouTube (ABS-CBN Entertainment)
- February 9: All TV News: Balitang Recap on Facebook (All TV News)
- March 22: Roadkillers on Viva One
- May 7: Can't Buy Me Love on Netflix
- May 8: Can't Buy Me Love on iWantTFC
- June 12: What's Wrong with Secretary Kim (Philippine adaptation) on Viu
- June 14: Sem Break on Viva One
- July 12: Zoomers (season 2) on YouTube (ABS-CBN Entertainment)
- July 18: LOL: Last One Laughing Philippines (season 1) on Amazon Prime Video
- August 14: Sparks Camp (season 2) on YouTube (Black Sheep)
- August 28: High Street on iWantTFC
- October 8: Kuan on One (season 1) on iWantTFC and YouTube (ABS-CBN Entertainment)
- October 9: Drag Race Philippines (season 3) and Drag Race Philippines: Untucked! (season 3) on HBO Go and WOW Presents Plus
- November 11: Pamilya Sagrado on iWantTFC
- November 29: Halfmates on YouTube (ABS-CBN Entertainment)
- December 20: Chasing in the Wild on Viva One
- December 24: Pulang Araw on Netflix

== Networks ==
=== Launches ===
The following are a list of free-to-air and cable channels or networks launches and closures in 2024.

Date	Station	Type	Channel	Source
January 17	Blast Sports	Free-to-air	Channel 31 (digital feed)	
January 23	Congress TV	Free-to-air	Channel 14 (digital feed)^{1} Channel 17 (digital feed)^{2} Converge Vision Channel 42 (Metro Manila)^{3} Sky Cable Channel 29 (Metro Manila); Cignal TV Channel 17 (Nationwide)	
March 15	One Sports HD	Cable and satellite	Cignal Channel 258 (Nationwide)	
May 1	True TV	Cable and satellite	Cignal TV Channel 19 (Nationwide); SatLite Channel 19 (Nationwide)	
May 27	PRTV Prime Media	Free-to-air	Channel 31 (digital feed); Cignal Channel 31 (Nationwide)	
July 3	DWAN TV	Free-to-air	Channel 17 (digital feed)	
August 21	DWIZ News TV	Free-to-air	Channel 23 (digital feed)	
September 9	Bilyonaryo News Channel	Free-to-air	Channel 31 (digital feed); Cignal Channel 24 (Nationwide); Converge Vision Channel 74 (Metro Manila); Sky Cable Channel 35 (Metro Manila); Cablelink Channel 67 (Metro Manila)	
September	FilAm TV	Cable and satellite, OTT/digital streaming	Converge Vision Channel 108 (Metro Manila); Converge FiberTV Channel 108 (Provincial)	
September	Vegas Life TV	Cable and satellite, OTT/digital streaming	Converge Vision Channel 109 (Metro Manila); Converge FiberTV Channel 109 (Provincial)	
November 4	D8TV	Free-to-air	Channel 31 (digital feed)	
November 7	Abante TeleTabloid	Cable and satellite	Sky Cable Channel 85 (Metro Manila)	
November 18	PTV Sports Network	Free-to-air	Channel 14 (digital feed); Sky Cable Channel 33 (Metro Manila)	
December 2	Mindanow Network	Cable and satellite, OTT/digital streaming	Sky Cable Channel 77 (Metro Manila); The Roku Channel (United States); Amazon Fire TV (United States)	

- Notes
1. ^1: until November 17
2. ^2: starting October 1
3. ^3: starting November 1

=== Stations changing network affiliation ===
The following is a list of television stations that have made or will make noteworthy network affiliation changes in 2024.

Date	Station	Channel	Prior affiliation	New affiliation	Source
February 1	RPN	9	CNN Philippines	RPN/RPTV	

=== Rebranded ===
The following is a list of television stations or cable channels that have made or will make noteworthy network rebrands in 2024.

Date	Rebranded from	Rebranded to	Type	Channel	Source
February 1	CNN Philippines	RPN/RPTV	Broadcasting network	Channel 9 (analog feed); Channel 18 (digital feed); Channel 19 (digital feed); Cablelink Channel 103 (Metro Manila); Sky Cable Channel 14 (Metro Manila); Cignal Channel 9 (SD) / Channel 259 (HD) (Nationwide); G Sat Channel 8 (Nationwide); SatLite Channel 9 (Nationwide); Converge Vision Channel 9 (Metro Manila)	

=== Closures ===
The following is a list of stations and channels or networks that have stopped broadcasting or (permanently) off the air in 2024.

Date	Station	Type	Channel	Sign-on debut	Source
January 1	Aniplus Asia	Cable and Satellite	Cignal Channel 75 (Nationwide); SatLite Channel 85 (Nationwide)	May 15, 2017	
January 1	K-Plus	Cable and Satellite	Cignal Channel 171 (Nationwide)	May 25, 2018	
January 18	SMNI	Broadcasting network	Channel 39 and 43 (Metro Manila)	May 24, 2016	
January 18	SMNI News Channel	Broadcasting network	Channel 39 and 43 (Metro Manila)	May 24, 2016	
January 20	CNN Philippines	Free-to-air / Cable and satellite	Channel 9 (analog feed) / Channel 19 (digital feed) / Sky Cable Channel 14 (Metro Manila) / Cignal Channel 9 (Nationwide) / SatLite Channel 9 (Nationwide) / Cablelink Channel 14 (Metro Manila)	March 16, 2015	
January 22	RTVMalacañang	Free-to-air	Channel 14 (digital feed)	June 26, 2023	
March 1	Telenovela Channel	Cable and Satellite	Cignal Channel 126 (Nationwide)^{1} Sky Cable Channel 81 (Metro Manila) / Channel 619 (Provincial)	September 30, 2011	
March 1	Chinese Entertainment Channel	Cable and Satellite	Sky Cable Channel 98 (Metro Manila)	January 26, 1992	
March 5	PEP TV	Cable and Satellite	Converge Vision Channel 3 (Metro Manila); Air Cable Channel 3 / 243 (Provincial); Various cable providers in Central Luzon	2004	
April 1	beIN Sports 1	Cable and Satellite	G Sat Channel 75 (HD) (Nationwide); Sky Cable Channel 204 (HD) (Metro Manila) / Channel 767 (HD) (Provincial)	April 15, 2014	
April 1	beIN Sports 2	Cable and Satellite	Sky Cable Channel 206 (HD) (Metro Manila) / Channel 766 (HD) (Provincial)	October 23, 2013	
April 1	beIN Sports 3	Cable and Satellite	G Sat Channel 82 (HD) (Nationwide); Sky Cable Channel 205 (HD) (Metro Manila) / Channel 765 (HD) (Provincial)	October 23, 2013	
April 1	Paramount Network Asia	Cable and Satellite	Cignal Channel 52 (Nationwide); G Sat Channel 73 (Nationwide)^{2}	February 1, 2021	
April 14	UFM 105.5 TV	Cable and Satellite	Converge Vision Channel 6 (Metro Manila); Air Cable Channel 6 (Provincial)	2012	
August 1	Gem	Cable and Satellite	Cignal Channel 173 (Nationwide)^{3} G Sat Channel 46 (Nationwide); Sky Cable Channel 116 (Metro Manila) / Channel 222 (Provincial)	March 17, 2020	
September 1	Jungo TV Pinoy	Cable and Satellite	Converge Vision Channel 31 (Metro Manila); Air Cable Channel 31 (Provincial)	July 1, 2023	
September 1	Toro TV	Cable and Satellite	Converge Vision Channel 64 (Metro Manila); Air Cable Channel 64 (Provincial)	July 1, 2023	
September 1	ScreamFlix	Cable and Satellite	Cablelink Channel 34 (Metro Manila); Converge Vision Channel 61 (Metro Manila); Air Cable Channel 61 (Provincial)	June 22, 2022	
September 20	Front Row Channel	Cable and Satellite	Cablelink Channel 35 (Metro Manila); Converge Vision Channel 33 (Metro Manila); Air Cable Channel 33 (Provincial)	April 1, 2020	
September 20	Hallypop^{4}	Free-to-air	Channel 15 (digital feed); GMA Affordabox Channel 4 Sky Cable Channel 57 (Metro Manila); Cignal TV Channel 152 (Nationwide)	September 20, 2020	
September 20	Pinoy Hits	Free-to-air	Channel 15 (digital feed); GMA Affordabox Channel 6	January 16, 2023	

- Notes
1. ^1: via Cignal until January 2
2. ^2: via G Sat until February 15
3. ^3: via Cignal until April 5
4. ^4: Relaunched by Jungo TV as a linear channel on the Jungo Pinoy streaming service in November 2024

== Services ==
The following are a list of television operators or providers and streaming media platforms or services launches and closures in 2024.

=== Launches ===
Date	Provider	Type	Stream	Source
January 28	Bagong Pilipinas Digibox	DTT set-top device box	N/A	
March 3	Kapatid Livestream	Multicasting	Facebook (TV5); YouTube (TV5 Philippines)	
July 1	NewsWatch Plus	Multicasting	Various	

=== Rebranded ===
The following is a list of streaming providers that have made or will make noteworthy service rebrands in 2024.

Date	Rebranded from	Rebranded to	Type	Stream	Source
October 10	Vivamax	VMX	VOD OTT streaming media platform	—N/a	
November 19	HBO Go	Max	VOD OTT streaming media platform	—N/a	

=== Closures ===
Date	Provider	Type	Sign-on debut	Source

== Deaths ==
The following personalities who died in 2024:

January

- January 12 – Hansen Nichols (b. 1983), former contestant of Pinoy Dream Academy
- January 13 – Mario Bautista (b. 1946), columnist
- January 28 – Susan Isorena-Arcega (b. 1959)

February

- February 3
  - Roldeo Endrinal (b. 1963), head of ABS-CBN's production unit, Dreamscape Entertainment
  - Augusto "Jake" Almeda Lopez (b. 1928), former vice-chairman and board of director of ABS-CBN
- February 10 – Mike Lacanilao (b. 1935), broadcaster
- February 19 – Tikoy Aguiluz (b. 1952), film director

March

- March 2 – Jaclyn Jose (b. 1963), actress
- March 12 – Ernesto dela Peña (b. 1932), composer
- March 21 – Zenaida Seva (b. 1944), astrologer

April

- April 7 – Kathleen Okubo (b. 1953), journalist
- April 10 – Tito Mina, singer
- April 15 – Proculo Maslog (b. 1948), journalist
- April 27
  - Floy Quintos (b. 1961), playwright
  - Andy Santillan (b. 1958), former voice-over announcer of RPN
- April 28 – Francis Cardona (b. 1957), Executive Vice President for radio of the Kapisanan ng mga Brodkaster ng Pilipinas, president and CEO of the Radyo Pilipino network, journalist and television host

May

- May 6 – Esteve "Inozent One" Bohol (b. 1981), rapper
- May 7 – Ignatius Jones (b. 1957), singer and journalist
- May 10 – Priscila Rose Nalundasan (b. 1964), voice actress (Batibot)
- May 19 – Arsenio Ferriol (b. 1936), Chief Executive Minister and founder of Pentecostal Missionary Church of Christ (4th Watch) and speaker of Oras ng Katotohanan television and radio program
- May 24 – Leo Dominguez, talent manager
- May 25 – Carlo J. Caparas (b. 1944), comic strip artist, producer and director
- May 28 – Barbara "Tweetums" Gonzalez-Ventura (b. 1944), The Philippine Star columnist

June

- June 2 – Sherwin Buenvenida (b. 1978), headwriter
- June 18
  - Armando "Bing" Lao (b. 1948), screenwriter
  - Yoyong Martirez (b. 1946), basketball player, comedian, and former vice mayor of Pasig (2004–2013)
  - CJ de Silva-Ong (b. 1987), visual artist
- June 20 – Ruben Alabastro (b. 1941), journalist
- June 29 – Samuel Santos (b. 1961), journalist and head of the Senate media relations department (2013–2016)
- June 30 – Manny Castañeda (b. 1954), actor and director

July

- July 2 – Dinky Doo Jr. (b. 1958), actor and comedian
- July 13 – Chino Trinidad (b. 1967), sports journalist and executive and play-by-play commentator in the Philippine Basketball Association
- July 31 – Carmen Pateña (b. 1941), singer

August

- August 4 – Lily Monteverde (b. 1938), film producer (Regal Entertainment)
- August 10 – Didong Dumadag (b. 1977), comedian
- August 15 – Norma Marco (b. 1947), radio personality
- August 18 – Angel "Conrado" Sangalang, singer
- August 27 – Cesar Mangawang (b. 1953), columnist, (Philippine Daily Inquirer)

September

- September 16 – Danilo Luis Mariano (b. 1952), journalist
- September 27 – Socorro "Coritha" Avelino (b. 1951), folk singer

October

- October 6 – Edmund Aspero (b. 1947), journalist and radio host
- October 16 – Danny L. Mandia (b. 1954), father of modern Filipino dubbing
- October 19 – Wilde Almeda (b. 1935), evangelist, pastor and founder (Jesus Miracle Crusade)
- October 29 – Rommel Rebollido (b. 1957), journalist

November

- November 3 – Maita Sanchez (b. 1969), actress and mayor of Pagsanjan, Laguna (2010–2019)
- November 5 – Robert Alejandro (b. 1963), TV host, artist and co-founder of Papemelroti
- November 18 – Mercy Sunot (b. 1976), vocalist, Aegis
- November 20 – Elmer Abacahin (b. 1955), Catholic priest and journalist

December

- December 14 – Lina Sagaral Reyes (b. 1961), journalist and poet
- December 18 – Bobby Garcia (b. 1969), theater director and producer
- December 21 – Marife Mordido (b. 1958), makeup artist

== See also ==
- 2024 in television
