= MedTalk Health Talk =

Philippine public affairs TV show

- Also known as: MedTalk Health Talk
- Created by: Nine Media Corporation; Southern Broadcasting Network (2012–13); Radio Philippines Network (2013–24)
- Developed by: Nine Media News and Current Affairs; CNN Philippines
- Presented by: Dr. Freddie Gomez
- Country of origin: Philippines
- Original language: English
- No. of episodes: n/a (airs daily)

Production
- Production locations: CNN Philippines Newscenter, Worldwide Corporate Center, EDSA corner Shaw Boulevard, Mandaluyong, Philippines

Original release
- Network: Solar News Channel (2012–14); 9TV (2014–15); CNN Philippines (2015–24)
- Release: November 27, 2012 – January 23, 2024

MedTalk HealthTalk (formerly MedTalk) is a Philippine television infotainment show broadcast by Solar News Channel, 9TV and CNN Philippines. Hosted by Dr. Freddie Gomez, it aired from November 27, 2012 to January 23, 2024. It carried over as reruns through RPTV beginning February 1, 2024 and expanded its airing to Aliw Channel 23 on August 12, 2024.

== Hosts ==
Final host

- Dr. Freddie Gomez (2016–24)

Former host

- Angel Jacob (2012–16)

== See also ==
- Nine Media Corporation
- Solar Entertainment Corporation
- Solar News Channel
- Nine Media News and Current Affairs
- NewsWatch Plus
- RPTV (TV channel)
- Aliw Channel 23
- Daybreak
- CNN Philippines Newsroom
- CNN Philippines Network News
- CNN Philippines Nightly News
