= CNN Philippines Nightly News =

Defunct nightly newscast of CNN Philippines

- Logo used from 2015–16
- Also known as: Solar Nightly News (2012—14); Nightly News (2014—16)
- Created by: Solar Entertainment Corporation (2012–14); Nine Media Corporation (2012—16); Southern Broadcasting Network (2012–13); Radio Philippines Network (2012–16)
- Developed by: Nine Media News and Current Affairs; CNN Philippines/CNN
- Theme music composer: Hit Productions, Inc.
- Country of origin: Philippines
- Original language: English
- No. of episodes: N/A (airs daily)

Production
- Production locations: CNN Philippines Newscenter; Mandaluyong
- Running time: 60 minutes (2012–15); 30 minutes (2015–16)

Original release
- Network: Talk TV (2012); ETC (2012–13); RPN (2013); Solar News Channel (2012–14); 9TV (2014–15); CNN Philippines (2015–16)
- Release: July 16, 2012 – February 12, 2016

Related
- RPN NewsCap (in-house news programs); CNN Philippines Newsroom; CNN Philippines Network News

CNN Philippines Nightly News (titled as CNN Philippines Nightly News with Mitzi Borromeo) or simply Nightly News (formerly Solar Nightly News) is a Philippine television news broadcasting show broadcast by Talk TV, Solar News Channel, 9TV and CNN Philippines. Originally anchored by Nancy Irlanda, it aired from July 16, 2012 to February 12, 2016, replacing RPN NewsCap (in-house news programs) and was replaced by CNN Philippines Newsroom. The newscast aired every weeknights at 9:00 pm. Mitzi Borromeo serve as the final anchors.

== Background ==
=== 2012–2014: Talk TV/Solar News Channel ===
Logo used Ident as Solar Nightly News since July 16, 2012, until August 22, 2014

Formerly anchored by ABS-CBN news presenter Nancy Irlanda, the newscast was first known as Solar Nightly News and was launched on July 16, 2012, on Talk TV, by then aired on SBN UHF Channel 21. The launch of the newscast was a result of the formation as Solar Television Network's news and current affairs department, which in turn was brought by the privatization of Radio Philippines Network (RPN) by Solar Entertainment. It was carried over upon the channel's rebranding as Solar News Channel in October 30.

Solar Nightly News was simulcasted on RPN (by then affiliated by Solar Entertainment-operated ETC) from January 14 until November 29, 2013, after the network ceased production of its late-night newscast RPN NewsCap due to the retrenchment of the program's production team and other employees of the privatized network. The simulcast was also a replacement of Solar Network News to RPN's news content, as a result of Solar Entertainment's decision to scrap the cable-only limitation of American Idol season 12 and allow the broadcast to be available to RPN (over-the-air) viewers (in which the original plan was to limit the AI via satellite broadcast to cable viewers while RPN will continue to air Network News at 6 PM). On December 1, 2013, Solar News Channel switched its affiliation to RPN, making it a program at its own right.

Nancy Irlanda retired as the newscast's anchor on January 10, 2014; Mitzi Borromeo, anchor of Solar News program News Café took over by the end of the month. Hilary Isaac joined Borromeo weeks later but left some months later to join Daybreak.

=== 2014–2015: 9TV ===
Solar Nightly News dropped the Solar branding on July 21, 2014, upon the impending acquisition of Solar Television Network (now Nine Media Corporation) to the ALC Group of Companies a month later, with a new titlecard and graphic introduced on August 25, 2014, following channel's rebrand to 9TV. Mitzi Borromeo was held over as anchor. During the newscast's tenure, it also kept its one-hour runtime.

=== 2015–2016: CNN Philippines ===
The final incarnation was launched on March 16, 2015, in lieu with the launch of CNN Philippines along with a CNN-themed graphics and a revamped news studio. However, the newscast was cut to a half-hour to make way for the network's current affairs block. It also debuted segments such as Nightly Focus and Heads Up, a peek on the following day's headlines.

CNN Philippines Nightly News was axed on February 12, 2016, as a part of the network's program restructuring to be replaced by an Evening edition of Newsroom.

== Anchors ==
Final

- Mitzi Borromeo (2014–16)

Former

- Nancy Irlanda (2012–14)
- Hilary Issac (2014)

== See also ==
- List of programs previously broadcast by Radio Philippines Network
