= CNN Philippines Network News =

Defunct evening newscast of CNN Philippines

- Logo used from 2015–16
- Also known as: Solar Network News (2012–14); Network News (2014–17); Network News Weekend (2015–17)
- Created by: Solar Entertainment Corporation (2012–14); Nine Media Corporation (2012—17); Southern Broadcasting Network (2012–13); Radio Philippines Network (2012–17)
- Developed by: Nine Media News and Current Affairs; CNN Philippines/CNN
- Presented by: Pia Hontiveros (weeknights); Mai Rodriguez (weekends)
- Narrated by: Pia Hontiveros (weeknights); Mai Rodriguez (weekends)
- Opening theme: "World Pulse" by Philip Guyler
- Country of origin: Philippines
- Original language: English
- No. of episodes: N/A (airs daily)

Production
- Executive producer: Joseph Cataan
- Production locations: CNN Philippines News Studio, Mandaluyong
- Running time: 60 minutes (with commercials) (weeknights); 30 minutes (weekends); 2 hours (special editions, weekdays); 1 hour (special edition, weekends)

Original release
- Network: Talk TV (2012); RPN (2012); ETC (2012–13); Solar News Channel (2012–14); 9TV (2014–15); CNN Philippines (2015–17)
- Release: June 18, 2012 – March 26, 2017

Related
- CNN Philippines Newsroom; CNN Philippines Balitaan; RPN NewsWatch; Una sa Lahat; Frontline Pilipinas; Frontline Pilipinas Weekend

CNN Philippines Network News (titled as CNN Philippines Network News with Pia Hontiveros for its weekday broadcasts) or simply Network News (formerly Solar Network News) was a Philippine television news broadcasting show broadcast by Talk TV, Solar News Channel, 9TV and CNN Philippines. Anchored by Pia Hontiveros for weekdays and Mai Rodriguez for weekends. It aired from June 18, 2012, to March 26, 2017, replacing RPN NewsWatch (in-house news programs) and was replaced by News Night and Newsroom Weekend. The newscast aired seven days a week at 6:00 PM (PST).

== Background ==
=== As a weekday newscast ===
==== 2012-2014: Talk TV/Solar News Channel era ====
Title card used as Solar Network News since January 1, 2013 until August 22, 2014

The newscast was first known as Solar Network News and was launched on June 18, 2012, on Talk TV, by then aired on SBN UHF Channel 21, as a result of the formation as Solar Television Network's news and current affairs department, which in turn was brought by privatization of Radio Philippines Network (RPN) by Solar Entertainment. It was carried over upon the channel's rebranding as Solar News Channel in October 30, with its graphics updated on January 1, 2013.

Solar Network News was simulcasted on Radio Philippines Network (by then affiliated by Solar Entertainment-operated ETC; now SolarFlix) from October 30, 2012, until January 11, 2013, after RPN ceased production of its afternoon newscast RPN NewsWatch due to the retrenchment of the program's production team and other employees of the privatized network. The simulcast, however, was given to Solar Nightly News (which is at the mid-evening timeslot) on January 14 onwards to allow the via satellite broadcast of the twelfth season of American Idol to free TV (over-the-air) viewers. The original plan was to limit the AI "via satellite" broadcast to cable viewers while RPN would continue to air the newscast at 6:00 PM. On December 1, 2013, Solar News Channel switched its affiliation to RPN, making it a program at its own right.

==== 2014-2015: 9TV era ====
Solar Network News dropped the Solar branding on July 21, 2014, upon the impending acquisition of Solar Television Network (now Nine Media Corporation) to the ALC Group of Companies a month later, with a new title card and graphics introduced on August 25, 2014, following channel's rebrand to 9TV.

==== 2015-2017: CNN Philippines era ====
The current incarnation was launched on March 16, 2015, in line with the launch of CNN Philippines along with a CNN-themed graphics and a revamped news studio. On March 24, 2017, CNN Philippines Network News officially ended its weeknight run.

=== Weekend expansion ===
Prior to the third and final reformat, Solar News and subsequently 9News did not produce a weekend newscast except for severe weather coverage. Notable for such instance was Typhoon Hagupit (Ruby) in December 2014.

On June 13, 2015, CNN Philippines Network News expanded to seven days a week, branding the weekend editions as Network News Weekend albeit in a capacity as a half-hour newscast, unlike the 1-hour weeknight edition. Roanna Jamir was the inaugural anchor while doubling her duty as Weekend Updates top of the hour presenter.

On November 29, 2015, Roanna Jamir made her final broadcast on Network News Weekend, prior to leaving the network.

On December 5, 2015, CNN Philippines senior correspondent Ina Andolong replaced Roanna Jamir as the interim Saturday anchor on Network News Weekend while Nicolette Henson-Hizon and Menchu Macapagal rotated as Sunday anchor. By January 2016, Andolong consolidated the weekend chair.

As the Philippine version of New Day, a morning television show on CNN (US) launched on February 15, 2016, CNN Philippines newscasts updated their title cards with deep blue touch, similar in those newscasts in CNN International and revised their musical scoring. Claire Celdran replaced Mai Rodriguez to anchor the noontime edition of CNN Philippines Newsroom, while Rodriguez took over the Network News Weekend anchor chair since February 20, 2016.

=== Special editions ===
During news of urgent nature such as scheduled events, severe weather and breaking news, the weekday and weekend editions run two hours and one respectively. Notable of these instances are during the President's State of the Nation Address on an annual basis, the press conference of the then-President-elect Rodrigo Duterte that became notorious for his attitude with Mariz Umali, and more recently, the night of the impending arrest of Senator Leila de Lima. The newscast ran for nearly two hours with Senator Antonio Trillanes speaking with Pia Hontiveros.

== Cancellation ==
On March 7, 2017, the network announced that it will retire the newscast as a part of its sweeping program restructuring. It was replaced by News Night with Pia Hontiveros effective March 27. The network's move to retire the newscast was also partly due to viewers' complaints of retaining the Network News name despite rebranding three times.

On March 26, 2017, CNN Philippines Network News Weekend officially ended the near 5-year run of Network News.

== Final anchors ==
=== Weeknights ===
- Pia Hontiveros (2012–17)
- Mico Halili (2016–17, SportsDesk presenter)

=== Weekends ===
- Mai Rodriguez (2013–15, Weather weeknight presenter; 2016–17, weekend edition)

== Former anchors ==
=== Weeknights ===
- Jinno Rufino (2013–15, SportsDesk presenter)

=== Weekends ===
- Roanna Jamir (2015)
- Ina Andolong (2015–16, Saturdays)
- Nicolette Henson-Hizon (2015–16, Sundays, alternating with Macapagal)
- Menchu Macapagal (2013–15, Entertainment weeknight presenter; 2015–16, Sundays, alternating with Hizon)

== See also ==
- List of programs previously broadcast by Radio Philippines Network
