= DZKB-TV =

Television station in Metro Manila

RPN TV-9 Manila/RPTV-9 Manila (DZKB-TV)
- Para sa Pinoy!
- Metro Manila; Philippines
- City: Quezon City (via unclear signal/analog); Mandaluyong (studio); Antipolo (digital)
- Channels: Analog: 9 (VHF) (until January 15, 2027; 58 days' time); Digital: 19 (UHF) (ISDB-T); Virtual: 19
- Branding: RPTV Channel 9 Manila; RPN TV-9 Manila

Programming
- Subchannels: See list
- Affiliations: RPTV

Ownership
- Owner: Radio Philippines Network (Nine Media Corporation)
- Operator: TV5 Network, Inc.
- Sister stations: Through TV5: DWET-TV (TV5); DWNB-TV (One Sports); DWLA-FM (105.9 True FM); Through NMC/Aliw: DWIZ-AM (DWIZ 882 AM); DWQZ (97.9 Home Radio); DWBA-DTV (Aliw Channel 23)

History
- Founded: October 15, 1969
- Former affiliations: KBS (1969−1975); NV9 (1989−1994); C/S 9 (2008−2009); Solar TV (2009−2011); ETC (2011−2013); Solar News Channel (2013−2014); 9TV (2014−2015); CNN Philippines (2015−2024)
- Call sign meaning: Kanlaon Broadcasting System (former branding)

Technical information
- Licensing authority: NTC
- Power: Analog: 60,000 watts (50 kW on-operational power output); Digital: 5,000 watts
- ERP: Analog: 500 kW; Digital: 25,000 watts
- Transmitter coordinates: 14°38′18″N 121°1′47″E 14°34′39″N 121°10′5″E

DZKB-TV (VHF channel 9 Analog, UHF channel 19 Digital) is a television station in Metro Manila, Philippines, serving as the flagship of the RPTV network. It is owned by Radio Philippines Network, which is controlled by parent company Nine Media Corporation; TV5 Network, Inc., which owns TV5 flagship DWET-TV (channel 5), operates the station under an airtime lease agreement. Both stations, alongside True FM 105.9 share studios at the TV5 Media Center, Reliance cor. Sheridan Sts., Mandaluyong (which also serves as the network's broadcast facility).

DZKB-TV maintains its facility and digital transmitter (for DTV channel 19) located at Crestview Heights Subdivision, Brgy. San Roque, Antipolo, Rizal, on a tower site formerly owned by Progressive Broadcasting Corporation; and its office and analog transmitter (for VHF channel 9) are at the RPN Compound, #97 Panay Avenue, Brgy. South Triangle, Quezon City.

== History ==
RPN was established on June 29, 1960, when the Congress approved its franchise. The network operates on radio only and on October 15, 1969, it began operating on television. In the late 1960s, the company was acquired by Roberto Benedicto, a Marcos' crony, and changed its corporate name as Kanlaon Broadcasting System (KBS).

DZKB-TV was established when KBS acquired channel 9 frequency from Lopez family's ABS-CBN under the callsign DZXL-TV.

When former Philippine President Ferdinand Marcos declared martial law on September 23, 1972, ABS-CBN facilities were turned over to KBS. In July 1978, KBS then moved to Broadcast City in Capitol Hills, Diliman, Quezon City alongside two networks owned by Benedicto, IBC and BBC, respectively. In 1975, KBS changed its identity as Radio Philippines Network (RPN).

Following Marcos' downfall after the 1986 People Power Revolution, RPN, IBC, and BBC were sequestered by the government. BBC's frequencies was awarded to ABS-CBN through an executive order, while RPN and IBC were turned over to the Presidential Commission on Good Government (PCGG).

Despite conflicts on TV ratings and competition, on October 8, 1989, RPN relaunched as New Vision 9. NV9 increased its transmitter's ERP to 1 million watts, resulting in clearer and better signal reception in the Greater Luzon Area.

In 1994, NV9 reverted its name to RPN and became the second VHF television network to broadcast in full surround stereo.

On March 11, 2007, RPN started their collaboration with cable company Solar Entertainment Corporation to enhance its ratings. On January 1, 2008, RPN begin airing Solar's C/S programs on channel's lineup following carriage dispute between Solar and Sky Cable. In October 2008, RPN rebranded as C/S 9 as part of permanent branding.

On November 29, 2009, C/S 9 rebranded as Solar TV. The channel's identity was changed as ETC on March 2, 2011. This relaunch came after Solar TV Network acquired 34% stake in RPN from the Philippine Government as part of RPN/IBC privatization in 2011.

On October 30, 2012, RPN announced the axing of RPN NewsWatch and NewsCap, as Solar TV took over the entire network's airtime. More than 200 employees were retrenched, effectively dissolves RPN's news department.

On December 1, 2013, Solar News Channel replaced ETC on RPN to enhance wider nationwide coverage as ETC returned to SBN.

In the third quarter of 2014, Solar Entertainment chief Wilson Tieng announced the sale of STVNI and RPN to ALC Group of Companies due to Solar's revenue deterioration after investing in RPN. As a result, the Solar brand was dropped from SNC's programming. SNC rebranded as 9TV on August 23, 2014.

The identity was changed once again on March 16, 2015, as CNN Philippines. This came after parent Nine Media Corporation signed a 5-year brand licensing agreement with Turner Broadcasting System to acquire the branding of CNN.

In 2017, RPN and Nine Media Corporation acquired their UHF transmitter complex in Crestview Heights Subdivision, Brgy. San Roque, Antipolo, Rizal, from Progressive Broadcasting Corporation to use RPN's Digital terrestrial television broadcast in Metro Manila and nearby provinces.

On January 25, 2024, Nine Media and CNN ended their partnership due to financial losses, poor ratings, and loss of advertiser's support. On January 29, 2024, CNN Philippines ceased its live news productions and will permanently shut down at the end of the month.

CNN Philippines rebranded as RPTV on February 1, 2024, in collaboration with RPN, Nine Media, and TV5 Network.

== Digital television ==
=== Digital channels ===
UHF Channel 19 (503.143 MHz)

| Channel | Video | Aspect | Short name | Programming | Notes |
|---|---|---|---|---|---|
| 19.01 | 1080i | 16:9 | RPTV HD | RPTV | Commercial broadcast |
| 19.02 | 480i | 4:3 | RPN SD Test 1 | (SMPTE Color Bars) | Test Broadcast |
| 19.33 | 240p | 16:9 | RPTV 1Seg | RPTV | 1Seg |

== Areas of coverage ==
=== Primary areas ===
- Metro Manila
- Cavite
- Bulacan
- Laguna
- Rizal

=== Secondary areas ===
- Pampanga
- Portion of Bataan
- Portion of Batangas
- Portion of Tarlac
- Portion of Nueva Ecija

== See also ==
- TV5 Network
- RPTV
- CNN Philippines
- Radio Philippines Network
- Nine Media Corporation
- List of Radio Philippines Network affiliate stations
