= ETC HQ =

- Created by: Solar Entertainment Corporation (2012-13)
- Developed by: Nine Media Corporation (2012-13); Radio Philippines Network (2012-13)
- Starring: Patti Grandidge; Julia Sniegowski; Mike Concepcion
- Country of origin: Philippines
- Original language: English
- No. of seasons: 2

Production
- Running time: 1 hour
- Production company: ETC Local Productions

Original release
- Network: ETC
- Release: September 16, 2012 – July 7, 2013

ETC HQ (stylised as etcHQ) is a Philippine infotainment show that aired on ETC from September 16, 2012 to July 7, 2013.

== Final hosts ==
- Patti Grandidge
- Julia Sniegowski
- Mike Concepcion
- Sam Sadhwani
- Kim Jones

== See also ==
- ETC (SEC's women-oriented free TV channel)
