= NewsWatch (Philippine TV program) =

Philippine television news show

- Final Title card used from November 30, 2009 to October 29, 2012.
- Also known as: RPN NewsWatch
- Genre: News broadcasting
- Directed by: Rudy Alberto
- Presented by: various anchors
- Opening theme: NewsWatch Theme by James Sace
- Country of origin: Philippines
- Original language: English
- No. of episodes: 11,024

Production
- Executive producer: Allen Pascual - Lugo
- Producer: Marigold Haber-Dunca (News Manager)
- Production locations: KBS Studios Roxas Boulevard, Pasay, Philippines (1970–72); KBS/RPN Studios Broadcast Plaza, Quezon City, Philippines (1972–78); RPN Studios Broadcast City, Quezon City, Philippines (1978–2012)
- Camera setup: Multiple-camera setup; Single-camera setup (News bulletin)
- Running time: 60 minutes (2009–2012); 30 minutes (1970–2009); 2 to 3 minutes (2008–2011) (News bulletin)
- Production company: RPN News and Public Affairs

Original release
- Network: Radio Philippines Network
- Release: June 1, 1970 – October 29, 2012

NewsWatch is a Philippine television news broadcasting show broadcast by Radio Philippines Network (formerly known as Kanalon Broadcasting System). The program premiered on June 1, 1970 to until October 29, 2012, replacing Eyewitness Reports and was replaced by CNN Philippines Network News, CNN Philippines Nightly News and Updates (who three outsourcing news programs). It is the longest-running English-language news broadcasting show of RPN.

Its reportorial teams are tasked to gather news from every major beat in the Greater Manila Area as well as nearby provinces.

== Broadcast chronology ==
Launched on June 1, 1970, it became one of the most watched English language newscasts on Philippine TV alongside The World Tonight of ABS-CBN, TV-13 News of IBC and The Big News of ABC (now TV5). It is dubbed as the "First TV Newspaper" in the Philippines. Prior to 2008, it produced some spin-offs such as:

- NewsWatch Balita Ngayon, a Filipino-language early evening newscast.
- NewsWatch sa Umaga, morning spin-off of the newscast.
- NewsWatch sa Tanghali, first Tagalog noontime newscast from 1994 to 2000, anchored by Angelique Lazo and Rolly "Lakay" Gonzalo.
- NewsWatch Junior Edition, first children and youth spin-off of the newscast that aired from 1979 to 1993.
- NewsWatch Evening Cast, first English-language early evening newscast anchored by Cathy Santillan, then it was anchored by Cielo Villaluna and Cristina Peczon; and later who was replaced by Marigold Haber and Buddy Lopa. It was also the first newscast from 1970 to 1999. From 1999 to 2000, it was named NewsWatch Primetime Edition.
- NewsWatch Prime Cast, a late night edition anchored by Harry Gasser, Cathy Santillan, Dody Lacuna, Lulu Pascual, Mike Toledo, and Coco Quisumbing and later Eric Eloriaga (Eloriaga, who is known for his very strong American English accent, also anchored rival newscast The Big News on ABC).
- NewsWatch Now, replacement of Primetime Balita aired from August 13, 2001 to March 9, 2007.
- RPN Jr. NewsWatch, second youth spin-off that aired in 2005.
- RPN Aksyon Balita, later NewsWatch Aksyon Balita, successor of NewsWatch from April 17, 2006 to January 4, 2008, first anchored by Erwin Tulfo, Aljo Bendijo, Connie Sison (all former ABS-CBN News talents), Jake Morales, Vikki Sambilay, and Bobby Yan.
- i-Watch News, replacement of NewsWatch Now anchored by former 103.5 K-Lite disc jockey Carlo Tirona, and Aryana Lim, who was replaced by Lexi Schulze after a few months. It aired from March 12, 2007, to January 11, 2008.

On July 3, 2000, NewsWatch made its one-year absence on television due to low ratings because of the premiere of the network's only Filipino-language late-afternoon newscasts Arangkada Xtra Balita and late-night newscast Primetime Balita. It was during that time that some television networks started airing late-night newscasts in Filipino-language from the last year of the 20th century. But Primetime Balita was replaced by NewsWatch Now and returning its English-language news reporting on August 13, 2001, until its final broadcast on March 9, 2007. On January 7, 2008, when Solar Entertainment channel C/S started to air on free-TV, it went back on the air replacing NewsWatch Aksyon Balita. It was anchored by the network's president and chief executive officer, former Defense secretary and senator Orly Mercado and the News and Public Affairs department manager Marigold Haber-Dunca. Because of Mercado's environmental advocacy, the background was adorned with plants On January 14, 2008, its late-night spin-off was aired as NewsWatch Second Edition. This broadcast was anchored by Jay Esteban and Queen Sebastian. It also started to air on cable on all frequencies occupying C/S. The network's hourly news bulletins was renamed as NewsWatch Update until February 25, 2011.

The show was reformatted into a reality show between June 7, 2008, and August 16, 2008. On October 11, 2008, another version was premiered, entitled NewsWatch Junior Edition with the contestants of the show anchoring it. This was the third youth spin-off of the RPN NewsWatch; the previous two were RPN NewsWatch Kids Edition (1979 to 1993) and RPN Jr. NewsWatch (2005).

On October 8, 2008, began covering Philippine Basketball Association (PBA) games. These were broadcast to coincide with the second half of the game on Wednesday and Friday. This coverage ended in 2011 when RPN lost its PBA broadcasting rights to Studio 23 (and later to TV5, A2Z and RPTV).

On February 16, 2009, former ABS-CBN news anchor and beauty queen Joyce Burton-Titular replaced Orly Mercado as anchor. Mercado was then able to focus on his duties as the network's president and CEO.

On November 30, 2009, Radio Philippines Network (RPN) relaunched as Solar TV. Broadcast times were changed from 30 minutes to 60 minutes duration. From the usual twice a day times of 5:30 p.m. and 11:00 p.m., it became once a day at 5:30 p.m. and Reema Chanco was engaged as an additional anchor. RPN NewsCap replaced NewsWatch Second Edition and started airing at midnight. In 2010, the timeslot was moved to 11:30 in the evening. It also continued to air on both free TV and on cable until February 25, 2011.

On March 2, 2011, after Solar Entertainment bought 34% stake in RPN, RPN relaunched as ETC. Alongside RPN NewsCap, RPN NewsWatch started to air only on free TV on that date at 5 p.m. as ETC had occupied the RPN frequency on all cable providers nationwide. But, it is still being managed to air only through Global Destiny Cable (now Destiny Cable, owned by Sky Cable) on channel 116, which was the frequency occupied by The Game Channel, a channel of Solar TV Network, occupying the 5:00 p.m. timeslot. On August 15, 2011, the two newscasts began to air on BEAM TV Channel 31 as The Game Channel was simulcast on that channel. Its simulcast on that channel stopped in October 2011.

After a total of 11,024 episodes in 42 years, on October 29, 2012, RPN NewsWatch and RPN NewsCap were axed due to the impending privatization of the network and the controversial retrenchment of some employees of the network. However, RPN NewsWatch is still used by RPN's provincial AM radio arm Radyo Ronda for its newscasts.

=== Revival (2024) ===
The NewsWatch brand was reactivated on July 1, 2024, and was revamped as NewsWatch Plus, a digital news and lifestyle media service. The news service was created by Nine Media Corporation together with RPN's indirect parent company Broadreach Media Holdings and is independently managed by former CNN Philippines staff and correspondents which were absorbed by Broadreach Media following the closure of the channel and the dissolution of its news department on January 31, 2024. The digital news channel currently produces daily news bulletins (NewsWatch Live) and a 15-minute primetime newscast (NewsWatch Now) through YouTube and X accounts formerly used by CNN Philippines. It is currently airing archives of public affairs content through RPTV (a free to air channel jointly owned by RPN/Nine Media and TV5 Network, which in turn replaced CNN Philippines on its flagship station), and as primetime block on its sister station Aliw Channel 23 since August 12; on July 3, 2024, NewsWatch Plus announced that it would produce new episodes for its programs and provide access to CNN Philippines archives for subscribers.

== Former anchors ==
- Frank Abao (1970–91)
- Roma Agsalud (interim anchor)
- Marlene Alcaide (2008–10)
- Ina Andolong (interim anchor)
- Thelma Aranda-Sugay
- Erwin Tulfo (RPN NewsWatch Aksyon Balita: 2006)
- Aljo Bendijo (RPN NewsWatch Aksyon Balita: 2006–07)
- Joyce Burton-Titular (First/Main Edition: 2009–12)
- Dennis Cabalfin (1970–75)
- Ninez Cacho Olivares
- Joe Carlos
- Reema Chanco (Main Edition: 2009–10)
- Luchi Cruz-Valdes
- Eric Eloriaga (Prime Cast/Final Cast: 1997–2000, RPN NewsWatch Now: 2001–07)
- Jay Esteban (RPN Arangkada Xtra Balita: 2001–03, Second Edition: 2008–09)
- Ernie Fresnido
- Harry Gasser (1976–97)
- Joanna Gomez Santos
- Rolly Lakay Gonzalo
- Audrey Gorriceta (interim anchor)
- Teresa Guanzon (NewsWatch sa Umaga, 1990–94)
- Vivienne Guilla (interim anchor; co-anchor: 2011-12)
- Joee Guilas (business segment: 2002–07)
- Marigold Haber-Dunca (Evening Cast: 1991–93, 1998–2000, RPN NewsWatch Now: 2001–03, First/Main Edition: 2008–11)
- Joyce Ilas (interim anchor)
- Ramon Imperial
- Kara Javier
- Phoebe Javier (interim anchor; co-anchor: 2011-12)
- Dody Lacuna
- Bong Lapira
- Pat Lazaro
- Mike Toledo
- Angelique Lazo (RPN Arangkada Xtra Balita/Arangkada Balita: 2001–06)
- Loren Legarda
- Arlene Lim-Farol
- Buddy Lopa (1987–94)
- Maeanne Los Baños (interim anchor)
- Twink Macaraig
- Jing Magsaysay (NewsWatch sa Umaga, 1990–98)
- Orly Mercado (2008–09)
- Carlo Tirona
- Jake Morales (RPN NewsWatch Aksyon Balita: 2006–07)
- Stephanie Ongkiko (interim anchor)
- Melissa Gecolea (interim anchor)
- Lulu Pascual (1991–94; interim anchor, 1994-2000)
- Cristina Peczon
- Raissa Puno-Diaz (interim anchor)
- Coco Quisumbing (1989–94)
- Lina Ramos
- Pete Roa
- Gaby Roldan-Concepcion
- Babe Romualdez
- Cathy Santillan (1985–2000)
- Vikki Sambilay (RPN NewsWatch Aksyon Balita: 2007–08)
- Bobby Yan (RPN NewsWatch Aksyon Balita: 2007–08)
- Queen Sebastian (Second Edition/RPN NewsCap: 2008–11)
- Connie Sison (RPN NewsWatch Aksyon Balita: 2006–07)
- Mel Tiangco
- Korina Sanchez
- Isabel Roces (RPN NewsCap: 2011–12)
- Lexi Schulze (RPN iWatch News: 2007–08)
- William Thio
- Bill Velasco
- Beverly Verches-Anterola
- Bob de Veyra
- Cielo Villaluna
- Charlie Ysmael

== See also ==
- Government of the Philippines
- Presidential Communications Office
- Radio Philippines Network
- List of programs previously broadcast by Radio Philippines Network
