= Talk TV (Philippine TV network) =

Defunct News and talk television network in the Philippines

- Type: Cable and broadcast television network
- Country: Philippines
- Availability: Defunct
- Owner: Southern Broadcasting Network (50%); Solar Entertainment Corporation (STVNI/Nine Media) (50%)
- Key people: Wilson Tieng (President, Solar Entertainment); William Tieng (Chairman, Solar Entertainment); Willy Y. Tieng (Vice-chairman, Solar Entertainment); Lucio Co (Chairman, Southern Broadcasting Network); Teofilo Henson (President and CEO, Southern Broadcasting Network)
- Launch date: March 2, 2011
- Dissolved: October 29, 2012
- Language: English (main); Filipino
- Replaced: ETC on SBN 21 (February 25 - March 1, 2011)
- Replaced by: Solar News Channel

Talk TV (stylized as talkv) was an English-language all-news and talk television network in the Philippines. It was a joint venture of Southern Broadcasting Network and Solar Entertainment Corporation through Solar TV Network, Inc. (now Nine Media Corporation). It was available over SBN 21 on free TV. Talk TV operated 24 hours a day on cable TV and 6:00 AM - 12:00MN on SBN 21 starting October 1, 2012.

Talk TV Test Broadcast continued until March 1, 2011. It started its full broadcast on March 2, 2011. Talk TV studios is located at Solar Media Center, WCC Building, EDSA corner Shaw Boulevard, Mandaluyong, and the transmitter is located at Strata 2000 Building, F. Ortigas Jr. Road, Ortigas Center, Pasig.

On October 29, 2012, at 05:30 am (UTC +8:00), TalkTV signed off for the last time to make way for the launch of the first 24-hour English news channel on both cable TV and free-to-air TV, Solar News Channel.

== Programming ==
Most of the programs are the U.S. morning or late night talk shows, on either live or taped broadcast.

After Solar Entertainment bought 34% of RPN, Solar opened Talk TV and finally ventured into news at the end of 2011.

From January 16, 2012, Talk TV started airing local programming through Solar TV Network's new news arm Solar News. These programs mainly feature former ANC and ABS-CBN personalities including Solar News chief Jing Magsaysay, Pia Hontiveros, Pal Marquez, Nancy Irlanda, Claire Celdran, Mai Rodriguez and Jun Del Rosario. Reporters included some from RPN's NewsWatch as well as new reporters.

The first local news event that was covered was the Renato Corona impeachment trial.

Talk TV also airs Solar Headlines which is a daily news break aired every 30 minutes, a primetime newscast named Solar Network News; launched on June 18, 2012, a late-night newscast, Solar Nightly News; launched on July 16, 2012, a morning newscast Solar Daybreak and a noontime newscast Solar Newsday; both launched on October 1, 2012.
