= 9News =

9News may refer to the following:

- Nine Media News and Current Affairs, defunct Philippine media production arm formerly known as Solar News and 9News
  - 9TV, formerly branded as Solar News Channel, its defunct news channel
- KUSA (TV), Denver, Colorado, USA, branded as 9 News
- Nine News, Australia, branded as 9News
