= Daybreak (Philippine TV program) =

- Created by: Solar Entertainment Corporation; Nine Media Corporation
- Developed by: 9News and Current Affairs
- Presented by: Amelyn Veloso
- Opening theme: "Skyrides" from NetCap Music Publishing
- Country of origin: Philippines
- Original language: English
- No. of episodes: n/a (airs daily)

Production
- Production locations: Solar Media Center; Mandaluyong
- Running time: 2 hrs.

Original release
- Network: Talk TV (2012); Solar News Channel (2012–14); 9TV (2014–15)
- Release: October 1, 2012 – March 13, 2015

Daybreak (formerly known as Solar Daybreak) is a Philippine television news broadcasting and talk show broadcast by Talk TV, Solar News Channel and 9TV. Originally hosted by Jing Magsaysay, it aired from October 1, 2012 to March 13, 2015, and was replaced by CNN Philippines Headline News. Amelyn Veloso, Hilary Isaac and Claudine Trillo serve as the final hosts. It featured daily headlines as well as national and local news, weather, traffic, sports, foreign, and entertainment stories. The program aired every weekdays from 7:00 am to 8:30 am (UTC+8:00).

Ident as Solar Daybreak from October 1, 2012, until August 22, 2014. Solar branding was dropped by July 21, 2014

== Final anchors ==
- Amelyn Veloso (deceased)
- Hilary Isaac
- Claudine Trillo

== Sit-in anchors ==
- Menchu Macapagal
- Nicolette Henson-Hizon

== Former anchors ==
- Claire Celdran
- Roanna Jamir
- Jing Magsaysay
- Pat Fernandez (Weather and Entertainment)
- Rod Nepomuceno

== See also ==
- Nine Media Corporation
- Solar Entertainment Corporation
- Solar News Channel
