= Solar Entertainment =

Filipino media company

Solar Entertainment Corporation
- Trade name: Solar Entertainment
- Type: Private
- Industry: Mass media
- Founded: January 3, 1976; 50 years ago (as a TV movie company); July 15, 1988; 38 years ago (as a film distribution company); June 17, 2000; 26 years ago (as a cable television network); January 1, 2008; 18 years ago (as a broadcast company)
- Headquarters: Solar Century Tower, 100 Tordesillas St., Corner H.V. Dela Costa St., Salcedo Village, Brgy. Bel-Air, Makati, Metro Manila, Philippines
- Area served: Worldwide
- Key people: William Y. Tieng (Chairman); Willy Y. Tieng (Vice Chairman); Wilson Y. Tieng (President and CEO); Gidget Lao (Chief Executive for Business Operations)
- Products: Films; Music; Television programs; Web portals; Sporting events; Real estate; Food distribution; Transportation; satellite telecommunications
- Brands: E-Novation TV; Solar All Access; SolarFlix; Solar Learning (DepEd TV); Solar Sports; Solar Pictures; Solar Scoop; Sinag Maynila Film Festival; BYD; Dynamex; Dynamo; Federated Distributors, Inc.; Gourdo's; KLG; KLG Foodservice; L. Meyerf Pharma, Inc.; Manila Goldcoast Development Corporation; Shacman; Solar Resources; Winning Touch International Marketing, Inc.
- Services: Broadcasting; Television; Cable television TV Production; Motion Picture; Film distribution Digital media Streaming; Foodservice
- Revenue: ▲ ₱1.372 billion (FY 2015)
- Operating income: ▲ ₱124.43 million (FY 2015)
- Owner: Solar Films Inc. (38%); Wilson Y. Tieng (21%); William Y. Tieng (15%)
- Divisions: Former: Nine Media News and Current Affairs (formerly Solar News) (2011—2024)
- Subsidiaries: Current: Southern Broadcasting Network; Solar Digital Media Holdings; Domestic Satellite Philippines, Inc. Former: Nine Media Corporation (formerly Solar Television Network, Inc.) (2011—2014): Radio Philippines Network (34% share) (2011—2014)
- Website: solarstudiosinc.com

Solar Entertainment Corporation (doing business as Solar Studios Inc. and also known as Solar Entertainment, and simply known as Solar or SEC) is a Filipino media company based in Makati, Philippines. Founded and owned by the brothers Wilson, William and Willy Tieng, Solar Entertainment operates three digital free-to-air channels and one cable channel. Solar also owns a film distribution company (Solar Pictures) and defunct freemium digital television service (Easy TV Home).

Solar Entertainment owns and operates three digital TV channels: SolarFlix, Solar Sports, DepEd TV and E-Novation TV. It also owns television network Southern Broadcasting Network (SBN).

Solar Entertainment formerly owns Nine Media Corporation, a Solar's former broadcast media firm, which privatized Radio Philippines Network (RPN) in 2011. NMC and RPN are currently owned by ALC Group of Companies and operates RPTV, a free-to-air channel in partnership with TV5 Network.

== History ==
=== Film production and distribution ===
Solar Entertainment was founded by the brothers William Tieng, Wilson Tieng and Willy Tieng in 1976. Solar Films was then formed in 1988 (one of the first films distributed by Solar Films was Rambo III of Sylvester Stallone), bringing international films (and later, local films since 2009) to the Philippines. Since 2012, Solar has collaborated with independent film director Brillante Mendoza for a multiple film contract. On March 18, 2015, Solar launched the Sinag Maynila film festival, which featured five films from a talented group of directors, each with a different vision and approach. The films were shown in select SM Cinemas from March 18 to 24, 2015. The winners were announced at the “Gabi ng Parangal” on March 22.

On April 2, 2004, Solar announced that they distribute films from United International Pictures (UIP, a joint venture of Viacom's Paramount Pictures and Vivendi Universal's Universal Pictures) in the Philippines starting with DreamWorks Animation's Shrek 2 in May 2004, until a temporary restraining order stopping UIP's operations in the country in March 2014.

=== Cable television ===
On January 1, 1994, Solar launched on cable television as the Solar Entertainment Channel.

On December 22, 2000, Solar acquired Domestic Satellite Philippines Inc. (DOMSAT) from the Philippine government through Presidential Commission on Good Government after Solar won the bidding for the franchise and assets formerly owned by DOMSAT, making DOMSAT a 100% Solar subsidiary. As a result, DOMSAT's teleport is being used by Solar to produce, originate, and distribute its various television program services. Its full service digital broadcast teleport features server technology facility located in Barangay Sta. Cruz, Sumulong Highway, Antipolo, Rizal. It is built around two encoder platforms, Scientific Atlanta Power Vu Classic(DVB) and Motorola Digicipher II(MPEG-@). Program origination is done on a SeaChange Media Cluster Server System. The facility includes a 500-square-meter studio and various linear and non-linear production bays. Solar Entertainment first launched its namesake entertainment cable channel in the early 2000s, one devoted to American programs. This channel was later known as Solar USA (the acronym stands for "Ultimate in Suspense and Action"), and then later simply as USA before it was replaced by two separate channels (Jack TV and Crime/Suspense or C/S).

On January 17, 2004, Solar launched on cable sports alternative channel as Sports Plus.

On March 1, 2004, Solar Entertainment launched ETC or Entertainment Central, which is positioned as the country's premier cable female entertainment channel. ETC is a platform that brings its audience closer to their aspirational lifestyle, as embodied by their idols.

On April 5, 2005, it test launched delivering debuting service. Intended for a predominantly male audience, the company launched the country's leading general entertainment cable channel, Jack TV, in July.

On October 15, 2005, Solar Entertainment launched a crime and action cable channel, Crime/Suspense or C/S

On December 15, 2005, Solar Entertainment launched a spin-off channel to ETC, ETC 2nd Avenue, a lifestyle and general entertainment channel. Started as a test broadcast on December 15, 2005, and had its full launch in 2006. The channel was later renamed as 2nd Avenue on January 17, 2007.

On October 1, 2006, Sports Plus ceased broadcasting and replaced by the Basketball TV channel formed by Solar, while moving most of Sports Plus programs to Solar Sports.

=== As a broadcast company ===
On January 1, 2008, Solar Entertainment Corporation entered into a partnership with RPN, SBN and RJTV for block time programming from its cable TV channels. The move was a result of Sky Cable pulling out C/S, ETC, and 2nd Avenue from the cable company's lineup at their own right. Those three started carrying shows from Solar's, with C/S on RPN, ETC on SBN, and 2nd Avenue on RJTV.

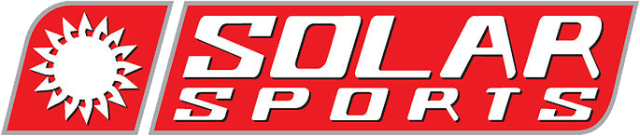
Former logo of Solar Sports

On May 22, 2009, a victory party for Manny "Pacman" Pacquiao, who just became the new IBO (International Boxing Organization) and Ring Magazine Light Welterweight Champion, was held at the Renaissance Hotel in Makati, in partnership with GMA Network Inc. Solar and GMA executives at that time signed for a partnership in TV coverage of Manny Pacquiao's upcoming boxing matches.

The C/S cable channel was later rebranded as C/S Origin in September 2008, while the RPN network later changed its branding to C/S 9 the next month.

On November 29, 2009, Solar rebranded C/S9 as Solar TV at 11:00 am with a slogan It's A Bright New World on RPN. On October 31, 2010, it changed some of its programming content to English/Tagalog with a new slogan Kung Saan Lahat Panalo!. On January 5, 2010, Solar TV was incorporated as a Solar's broadcast media arm.

In mid-2010, Gem Communications Holdings, a media firm led by Lucio Co, sold its 97% equity share in SBN to Solar for Php 368.8 million. Since then, SBN became the Solar's fully owned subsidiary.

On February 11, 2011, SEC partnered with ABS-CBN Corporation to air National Basketball Association (NBA) games over free TV starting February 19, 2011. The games are aired on Studio 23 (later S+A, IZTV and now Aliw 23) and ABS-CBN, but Solar still airs the games daily on BTV.

Logo of Solar TV as a television network

On March 2, 2011, after SEC acquired 34 percent of RPN's shares from the Philippine government as part of RPN/IBC privatization in 2011, Solar TV finally ventured into news at the end of 2011. On that same day, ETC moved to RPN while TalkTV launched over SBN. TalkTV was formed by then Solar-owned Solar Television Network. The first programs that aired on the channel were Dateline NBC, Today Show, Today's Talk, NBC Nightly News, Inside Edition, The Tonight Show with Jay Leno and Late Show with David Letterman.

On April 8, 2011, Solar Entertainment launched The Game Channel on Destiny Cable. It conducted its initial test broadcast from April 8, 2011, until September 29. It then began airing on BEAM Channel 31 on August 15, 2011, after BEAM and Solar signed an affiliation deal, which gave the latter the use of the former's facilities. Full broadcast started on September 30, 2011.

In May 2011, ETC launched the slogan "Young and Loving It". It also saw new programs such as the reality series The Rachel Zoe Project and Bachelor Pad, drama series Nikita, and The Secret Circle, US reality series The Glee Project, comedy shows like New Girl and 2 Broke Girls, and local lifestyle show Etcetera. In 2012, ETC includes the reality show American Idol, local programs like Project Runway Philippines (season 3), drama series The Lying Game, Emily Owens MD and Beauty & the Beast, and local infotainment show ETC HQ. In 2013, ETC aired comedy-drama series The Carrie Diaries, sitcom series Super Fun Night, supernatural drama series Ravenswood, horror fantasy drama series The Originals and among others.

Solar News, known for its back-to-basics and unbiased journalism, was formed in January 2012 during the coverage of the impeachment trial of former Chief Justice Renato Corona. Post-EDSA revolution ABS-CBN newsmen Pal Marquez, Jing Magsaysay and Pia Hontiveros together with former ANC anchors Claire Celdran, Mai Rodriguez and Nancy Irlanda, known as the pillars of Solar News. Most of its news reporters are from ABS-CBN and ANC, as well as from RPN NewsWatch.

On December 24, 2011, The Game Channel limited its broadcast on daytime sharing with a new programming service called CHASE which takes over the evening block. In February 2012, both services aired a promotion, announcing the split of CHASE and TGC to form themselves as separate channels. On February 15, 2012, The Game Channel finally shuts down on free TV and was relaunched as a cable channel; CHASE was also relaunched as a separate channel, now occupying the entire BEAM broadcast airtime on Free TV.

On April 3, 2012, Solar transferred its former Salcedo Village facilities to their new facility in Worldwide Corporate Center in Mandaluyong. It also featured a newly constructed set for Solar's then-news division, which would become fully functional three months later.

On July 16, 2012, Solar News launched its first local newscast Solar Network News, followed by Solar Nightly News, an hourly Solar News Update, Solar Daybreak, and Solar Newsday.

On September 7, 2012, Jack TV plugged their announcement through CHASE programs bearing the title "Another Jack TV is rising, coming soon on this channel" (BEAM Channel 31). This indicated that CHASE was being replaced; finally, on October 20, 2012, Jack City was then launched, marking October 19 as the end of CHASE's broadcasts. Jack City still does carry some of CHASE's programs however.

In October 2012, it was found out that Solar News would replace the government-controlled RPN News, as a result of RPN's privatization, making Solar TV covering the entire network's airtime. More than 200 RPN employees, particularly those from the labor union and the NewsWatch staff, were retrenched and RPN News was closed down on October 29, effectively axing NewsWatch and NewsCap. Some retrenched government employees were relocated to either People's Television Network (PTV 4) or Intercontinental Broadcasting Corporation (IBC 13) (both State-run broadcasters).

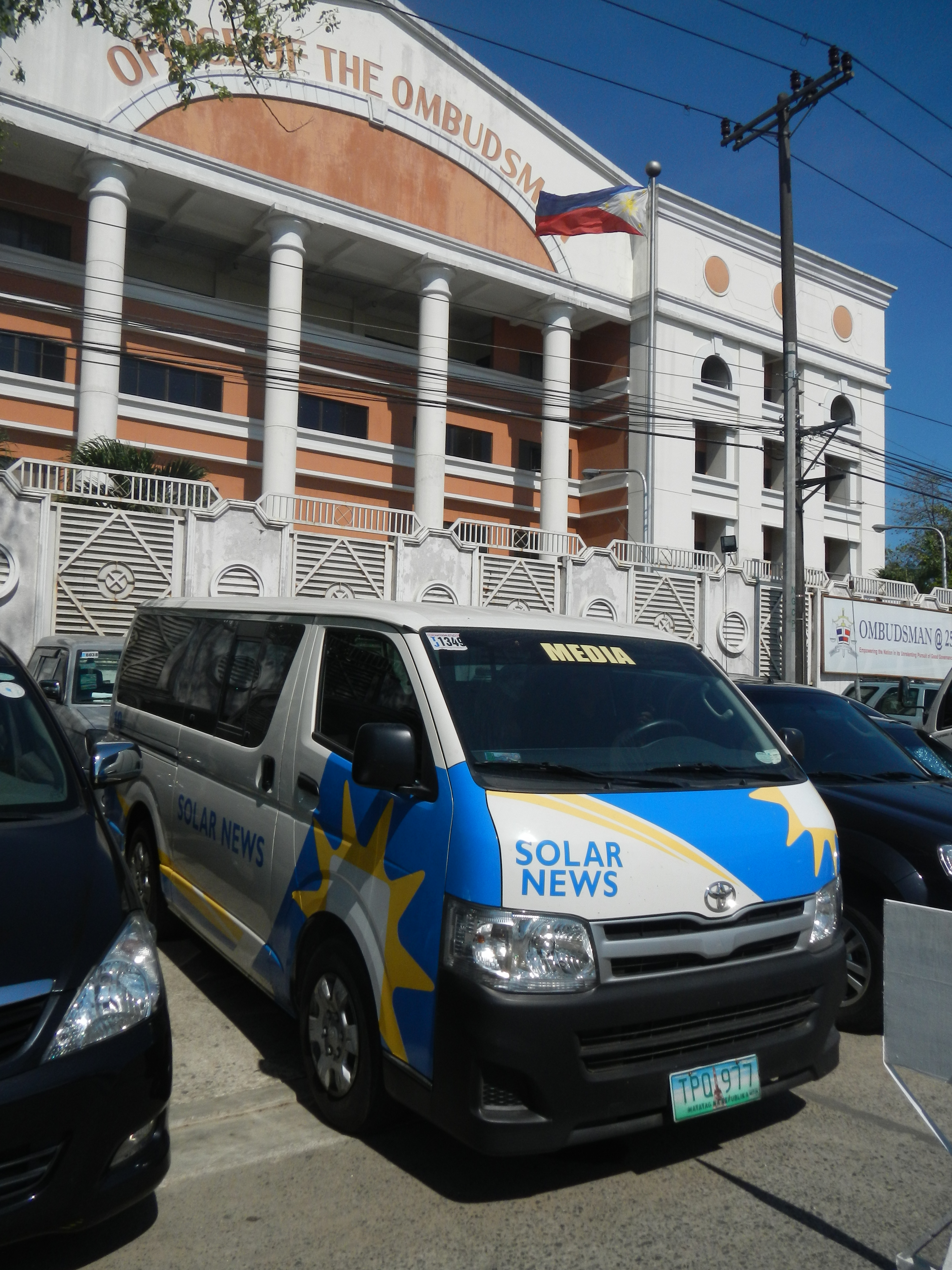
A Toyota HiAce van used by Solar News parked at the Office of the Ombudsman.

On October 30, 2012, at 5:45 am, TalkTV was replaced as Solar News Channel on Channel 21 via SBN. The channel saw the relaunch of sports news program Solar Sports Desk (now known as CNN Philippines Sports Desk), as well as the initial telecast of the Solar News and Current affairs block in November 2012 comprising five public affairs programs (Legal HD, MedTalk, News.PH, Opposing Views, Elections 2013 and News Café), 60 Minutes, Top Gear, Undercover Boss and the "Stories" documentaries block. In January 2013, Solar News Cebuano (now known as CNN Philippines Cebuano News) made history as the first national newscast delivered in a local dialect. In 2014, it also launched the Kapampangan national newscast, Kapampangan News and the public service program Serbisyo All Access, which is shown in Filipino language.

Prior to the channel's transfer to RPN, SNC's flagship newscast (Solar Network News) simulcasted on RPN 9 (free TV only) from the SNC's launch. The news content for RPN (then affiliated with ETC), however, was switched to Solar Nightly News on January 14, 2013, onwards, to avoid backlash from free TV viewers, particularly Free TV viewers of American Idol (in which the original plan was to replace the 6 pm via satellite broadcast to Free TV viewers by Network News, then airs the AI episodes at the 8 pm rerun in simulcast with cable and satellite viewers). Throughout the American Idol season, as the episodes are repeated at 8 PM on cable, Solar used the separate free TV-only feed, that contains reruns of selected ETC shows (but with advertisements replaced by ETC teasers and promotions) at 8 pm and Nightly News at 9 PM (with additional ETC programs, if necessary) to be used by RPN after each AI via satellite episode before RPN returns to the main ETC feed at 10 PM. This is to retain RPN's news content as it then has no newscast since the axing of NewsWatch.

On January 3, 2013, SEC launched Blink Cinema (later renamed as My Movie Channel) with the full broadcast taking effect later that month.

On April 14, 2013, TV5 Network Inc. and Solar Entertainment joined to broadcast the 2013 FIBA Asia Championship in Manila on Philippine television on August 1–11. Aside from TV5 and its sister channel (AksyonTV), the games were also broadcast over Solar's cable channel Basketball TV.

=== New management ===
On May 22, 2013, SEC appointed two officers to manage its broadcasting and cable businesses: Manuel “Meckoy” Quiogue as chief commercial officer and Maria Theresa “Mitos” Borromeo as chief operating officer (COO). Quiogue, however, suddenly died on May 31, 2013, prior to assuming his position.

On June 28, 2013, Jack City reduced its free TV broadcast to 18 hours a day on BEAM in compliance with the National Telecommunications Commission's guidelines. However, it still continues to air as a cable channel 24 hours a day.

On November 9, 2013, San Miguel Corporation's president and COO, Ramon Ang, explored the possibility of acquiring a controlling stake in Solar Entertainment Corporation as well as it's television subsidiary in his personal capacity. However, no further announcements were made after this and Ang subsequently reached an agreement to acquire a minority stake.

Solar News Channel and its partnership moved to RPN 9 on December 1, 2013 in favor to expand its nationwide coverage, while ETC returned to SBN Channel 21 a day before. (ETC was aired on SBN-21 from 2008 to 2011 then to RPN-9 from 2011 to 2013), as well as the launch of Solar's video-on-demand website Blink. As a result of the channel swap (on RPN's part), Network News and Nightly News became newscasts on its own right.

In 2014, Solar Entertainment's Solar One Boracay happened during the Labor Day weekend to showcase its channels (ETC, 2nd Avenue, JackTV, JackCITY, My Movie Channel, The Game Channel, Solar Sports, BTV and NBA Premium TV) through various summer activities all over the island.

On August 20, 2014, Solar Entertainment Corporation chief Wilson Tieng announced that he had sold his entire share on Solar TV Network, Inc., including its 34% majority share on RPN, to Antonio Cabangon-Chua, owner of business daily BusinessMirror and Aliw Broadcasting Corporation. Tieng sold Solar TV because their revenues were deteriorated after its investment in RPN. As a result of this ownership change, STVNI (now known as Nine Media Corporation since October 2014), Solar News Channel (later 9TV, CNN Philippines, and now RPTV) and RPN's majority stake were separated from the Tiengs; while ETC, 2nd Avenue, and Jack City reverted to Solar Entertainment's ownership.

On September 1, 2014, Jack City ended its run on free TV due to the preparations being made by BEAM 31 for the incoming transition to ISDB-T digital television, though it continues to be broadcast as a separate cable channel. However, Jack City continued to broadcast on cable networks until March 21, 2015. After Jack City's closure to free TV, BEAM aired under blocktime programs from various local production and religious companies. On November 15, 2014, BEAM began being carried on Sky Cable and Destiny Cable subscribers (per compliance with NTC's "must-carry" basis). This move resulted of Jack City in a change of its channel assignment for SkyCable and Destiny Cable subscribers, as well as several pay TV companies.

In 2015, Solar Entertainment Corporation launched the #1stonPHTV brand of Solar channels for ETC, 2nd Avenue, Jack TV, Jack City and My Movie Channel, with the brand implemented on January 6, 2015. Since then, all SEC channels broadcast first-run foreign television programs with the hashtag #1stonPHTV (First on Philippine TV), which was formerly known as "Match Airing" (ETC), "Playing 1st" (Jack TV), "The Newest in the US" and "FastCast" (2nd Avenue) and "See It First" (Jack City).

The Game Channel, after almost three years on broadcasting, selling or ceased on February 28, 2015. The channel space was taken over by My Movie Channel on March 1.

On March 22, 2015, Jack City was replaced by CT, thus becoming independent from its parent network. Upon launch, the channel broadened its programming focus by adding talk shows, sitcoms and men's lifestyle programs to its roster.

On March 26, 2015, Solar Entertainment announced its broadcast of the "Fight Of The Century" between Manny Pacquiao and Floyd Mayweather Jr. on May 3, 2015. As stated in a press conference that day, it was broadcast on May 3 via delayed broadcast in three major television stations in the Philippines, ABS-CBN, TV5, and GMA Network (who waived its exclusive contract with Solar to allow its multi-network coverage, but maintained its exclusive live broadcast on its radio division), with Solar Sports as its main content provider for this historic event in boxing.

On July 1, 2015, My Movie Channel ceased broadcasting. The closure or selling was announced by Solar a day before.

=== Rebranding of the four flagship networks ===
On October 16, 2016, Solar relaunched its flagship channels ETC, 2nd Avenue, Basketball TV and Solar Sports. The four networks unveiled their new logos, on-air graphics and station IDs, which took effect on that day. CT, Jack TV, Shop TV and NBA Premium TV on the other hand remains unchanged. Also that day, Solar launched its corporate campaign slogan ...There's More To Come, which evolved in 2017 as We go for More.

In 2017, Solar Entertainment became the official Philippine broadcaster of the 65th edition of the Miss Universe in Manila. This led to another deal with ABS-CBN, TV5 and GMA (the second time that such deal happened between Solar and the Big 3 networks). According to some sources, a directive from President Duterte ordered that the major networks must cover the prestige pageant as it happens live in the Philippines. Alongside the Big Three, Solar Entertainment channels ETC, 2nd Avenue, Jack TV and CT aired the pageant simultaneously. It was also in the same year when Solar Entertainment forged a joint venture with the Bermuda-based communications satellite company Asia Broadcast Satellite to launch the first nationwide free-to-air direct-to-home satellite television services using the C-band, which is set to launch on the 3rd quarter of the year.

On August 18, 2025, Solar Entertainment launched livestreaming exclusive and recapping episodes for old, new and well-loved shows of SolarFlix and Solar Sports and movies on their digital and online platforms such as YouTube Solar Watch Now.

== Carriage disputes ==
=== Sky Cable ===
==== 2008 ====
Solar's channels have ceased airing on Sky Cable, the Philippines' largest cable television provider. An insider claims that these troubles with Sky Cable started when boxer Manny Pacquiao, whose fights Solar Entertainment has the exclusive right to air and distribute to, moved from ABS-CBN, the flagship television network of ABS-CBN Corporation and the primary owner of Sky Cable Corporation, to rival GMA Network. Another insider claims that SkyCable wanted to remove ETC and Jack TV to make room for their own channels, Velvet (now defunct) and Maxxx (now defunct). Sky Cable wanted to retain C/S, 2nd Avenue, Solar Sports and Basketball TV, but Solar made a decision that they would only renew their contract if Sky Cable carried all six channels. Thus, Solar decided to pull out all their channels rather than remove ETC and Jack TV.

However, Solar has signed a deal with local terrestrial channels ABC, RPN, SBN and RJTV for block-time programming. C/S, ETC and 2nd Avenue programming are seen on terrestrial TV channels RPN, SBN and RJTV, respectively, while NBA and WWE programming were seen on TV5, now moved to RPN (WWE programming are currently being broadcast thru TV5, while its terrestrial NBA coverage were moved to ABS-CBN Sports under Solar).

Most of its channels were later returned to Sky Cable, while Jack TV would eventually return to its lineup on October 1, 2010, replacing Maxxx.

Meanwhile, Pacquiao's boxing promotion, Top Rank, signed a non-guaranteed contract with ABS-CBN Sports to exclusively air fights promoted by Top Rank, with the exception of Pacquiao fights which are still signed exclusively through Solar Entertainment.

==== 2017–2019 ====
On April 10, 2017, 3 days before the 2017 NBA playoffs was scheduled to begin (and coincided with the final day of the 2016–17 NBA regular season), Basketball TV, NBA Premium TV, Solar Sports, Jack TV and CT (now defunct) were removed by Solar from Sky Cable (including Sky Direct, Destiny Cable & Sky On Demand thru video on demand) without any prior announcement from Solar. Initially, both Basketball TV and NBA Premium TV were replaced by airing a simulcast of ABS-CBN Sports and Action with a ticker announcing the unavailability of the channels, with Solar Sports, Jack TV and CT (now defunct) also doing the latter albeit with a black screen. Later, almost all of the pulled-out Solar channels were replaced by an imaging card, initially detailing the unavailability of the channels and then later, announcing that they will discuss with Solar on returning the aforementioned channels; while for BTV and NBA Premium TV, a schedule of the NBA games that will air on ABS-CBN, ABS-CBN Sports and Action and Fox Sports within the week and a loop of an NBA promo. Solar did not comment on the situation for the removal of the channels, but sources and some netizens pointed out a carriage dispute between the two parties for not paying an undisclosed price to continue broadcasting these channels, which was later proven true by an article published by the Philippine Daily Inquirer.

As the dispute continued, some media enthusiasts and netizens raised concerns of whether these Solar channels will return to Sky and/or Destiny. Others pointed that inaction between the two parties could affect the next long-term local broadcast franchise with the NBA, slated to begin at the association's 2019–2020 regular season. (Solar and Sky's parent, ABS-CBN, would share the airing of NBA games on pay and terrestrial television. Rumours circulated that both networks may bid separately, if they could not reach renewal, and use their respective infrastructure to broadcast adequate NBA coverage. Otherwise, rival networks with a functioning sports department like The 5 Network may also seek their own bidding to take over the 2019 contract from both Solar and ABS-CBN.)

Netizens and viewers were dismayed and frustrated by the removal of the said channels by Sky Cable, most notably for BTV and NBA Premium due to the importance of the Playoffs. Some netizens were angered by the removal of the said channels and asked Sky Cable to return the channels before the scheduled Playoffs would begin, however Sky Cable would respond to angered netizens on social media that they are "fixing the situation with Solar". Other netizens and viewers would otherwise switch providers from Sky Cable to other cable companies that carried these channels or to other satellite providers like Cignal.

On October 16, 2018, Basketball TV and NBA Premium TV returned to Sky Cable, Sky Direct, & Sky On Demand after an 18-month absence; however it was removed on October 28, 2018, for unknown reasons.

The carriage dispute officially ended on January 1, 2019, when all Solar channels: Basketball TV, NBA Premium TV, Solar Sports, and Jack TV were restored on Sky (including Sky On Demand & Sky Direct).

Ironically, MTVph, which is a Solar channel, ended its operations on the same day that Sky resumed the affected Solar channels. As of 2019, Sky's sister company Destiny Cable still did not carry all the aforementioned Solar channels despite its aforementioned return on Sky Cable.

During the aforementioned period, Shop TV (now E-Novation TV), ETC and 2nd Avenue (now defunct) were kept on-the-air, due to the "must-carry" rules by the NTC. MTVph was also kept on the air (until it was discontinued on January 1, 2019) since it was carried in a separate programming agreement outside of the affected channels despite its ownership.

=== Dream Satellite TV ===
Dream Satellite TV ceased carrying three Solar Channels, namely Solar Sports, ETC (which was at that time a cable channel prior to its move to free TV and cable) and 2nd Avenue (now defunct) (except C/S 9) effective February 1, 2009. Dream's carriage contract with Solar Entertainment, which expired on December 31, 2008, was not renewed by Dream, citing financial constraints as its main reason. The three Solar channels were replaced by A&E's The History Channel, Biography Channel and Crime and Investigation Channel. As of 2017, ETC and 2nd Avenue remained on its lineup due to the "must-carry" rules of the NTC.

Unfortunately, Dream Satellite ended its operations on December 31, 2017, due to bankruptcy and its competition with other satellite providers.

== Divisions and subsidiaries ==
- ETC Productions
- Blink
- Solar Pictures
- Domestic Satellite Philippines, Inc. (DOMSAT)
- Southern Broadcasting Network (acquired in 2010 from Lucio Co's Gem Communications Holdings Corporation)
- Solar Digital Media Holdings (operator of Solar's digital television service Easy TV Home)

== Filmography of Solar Pictures ==
=== Notable local films released or distributed by Solar Pictures ===
- Syota ng Bayan (2001)
- Batas Militar (2006)
- Pacquiao: The Movie (2006) - with Star Cinema
- Anak Ng Kumander (2007)
- Ang Tanging Pamilya (2009) - with Star Cinema
- Kimmy Dora: Kambal sa Kiyeme (2009) - with Star Cinema
- Wapakman (2009)
- Flames of Love (2012)
- Sapi (2013)
- Mumbai Love (2014)
- Bonifacio: Ang Unang Pangulo (2014)
- Kid Kulafu (2015) - with Star Cinema
- Ma' Rosa (2016)
- Mulat (2016)
- Apocalypse Child (2016)
- Ang Larawan (2017, 43rd Metro Manila Film Festival's Best Picture)
- Siargao (2017, 43rd Metro Manila Film Festival's 2nd Best Picture)
- Citizen Jake (2018)
- Mary, Marry Me (2018)
- Rainbow's Sunset (2018)
- Mindanao (2019)
- GomBurZa (2023, 49th Metro Manila Film Festival's 2nd Best Picture) - with Jesuit Communications, MQuest Ventures/Cignal Entertainment, and CMB Film Services
- Sa Likod ng Tsapa (2025)
- Until She Remembers (2026) with Center Stage Productions
- She Who Must Not Be Named (2026) with Solar Studios, Inc / Oh Aye Productions Inc.

=== Sinag Maynila films ===
- Balut Country (2015) with Center Stage Productions and Embryo Films
- Bambanti (2015) with Center Stage Productions
- Imbisibol (2015) with Center Stage Productions
- Ninja Party (2015) with Center Stage Productions
- Swap (2015) with Center Stage Productions, Above the Line Productions, 8thumbs, and Epicmedia
- Dyamper (2016) with Center Stage Productions, Cinelarga Multimedia Productions, and Sampaybakod Productions
- Expressway (2016) with Center Stage Productions, Strawdogs Studio Productions, and Waveslicer Films
- Lila (2016) with Center Stage Productions, Stained Glass Productions, and Keep Me Posted Inc.
- Mrs. (2016) with Center Stage Productions and Phoenix Features
- T.P.O. (2016) with Center Stage Productions, Mahusay Kolektib, and Outpost Visual

== Broadcast assets ==
=== Free-to-air and Pay TV channels ===
- E-Novation TV (2026–present, digital platform)
- Solar Flix (SBN: 2022–present)
- Solar Sports (1994–present, digital platform only, formerly Solar Entertainment Channel)
- Solar Learning (DepEd TV) (2020–present, digital platform)
- Hallypop (2025–present, pay TV platform; distribution rights)

=== Former subsidiary, divisions and broadcast assets ===
- Nine Media Corporation (formerly known as Solar Television Network, Inc.) (sold to ALC Group of Companies)
  - Solar News Channel (2012–2014)
  - Radio Philippines Network (34%)
  - Nine Media News and Current Affairs (formerly Solar News and 9News) (2011–2024)
- Rajah Broadcasting Network

=== Defunct cable, terrestrial channels and former digital TV distribution ===
- 2nd Avenue (Cable TV: 2005–2018, RJTV 29: 2008–2018, formerly ETC 2nd Avenue)
- 9TV (34%)^{1}
- Aniplus Asia (2018–2019)^{5}
- BTV (2006–2019)
- Boo (2018–2019)^{5}
- Cinemundo Pinoy^{5}
- C/S Origin (2008–2009)
- C/S 9 (Cable TV: 2005–2007, RPN 9: 2008–2009)
- CT (2015–2017)
- Chase (BEAM TV 31: 2011–2012)
- Hallmark Channel/Diva Universal Philippines (2009–2013)^{2}
- eGG Network (2020–2022)^{5}
- ETC (Cable TV: 2004–2022, SBN 21: 2008–2011, 2013–2022, RPN 9: 2011–2013)
- Front Row Channel (2020–2024, joint venture with Jungo TV)
- Gone Viral TV (2018–2019)
- Jack City (BEAM TV 31: 2012–2014, Cable TV: 2014–2015)
- Jack TV (2005–2020, now on web portal)
- Jungo TV Pinoy
- K-Plus (2018–2019)^{5}
- Living Asia Channel (2019)^{5}
- MTV (2018–2019)
- MTVph (2017–2018)^{3}
- Blink Cinema/My Movie Channel (2013–2015)
- NBA League Pass
- NBA Premium TV (2010–2019)
- Outdoor Channel (2018–2019)
- Playboy TV (2001–2005)
- Scream Flix (2022–2024)^{5}
- Shop TV (2005–2026)
- Solar All Access (2002–2016, formerly Solar Sports PPV)
- Solar News Channel (34%)^{4}
- Sports Plus (2004–2006)
- Solar TV (RPN 9: 2009–2011)
- Solar USA (2001–2005, split into Jack TV and Crime/Suspense)
- Talk TV (SBN 21: 2011–2012)
- Telenovela Channel (2019)^{5}
- TGC (BEAM TV 31: 2011–2012, Cable TV: 2011, 2012–2015)
- Toro TV^{5}
- SciFi/Universal Channel Philippines (2009–2012)^{2}
- Zee Sine (2018–2019)^{5}
- ZooMoo (2018–2019)^{5}
- ^{1}Joint venture with RPN 9 (2014–2015); now owned by Nine Media Corporation
- ^{2}Joint venture with Universal Networks International
- ^{3}Joint venture with Viacom International Media Networks Asia
- ^{4}Joint venture with RPN 9 (2013–2014)/SBN 21 (2012–2013)
- ^{5}Channel distribution only.

== See also ==
- Nine Media Corporation
