= Sa Likod ng Tsapa =

2025 Philippine documentary film

- Theatrical release poster
- Directed by: Editha Z. Caduaya
- Written by: Editha Z. Caduaya
- Story by: Hansel M. Marantan
- Starring: Hansel M. Marantan; Stefanio Rabino
- Cinematography: Willie Apa Jr.
- Edited by: Willie Apa Jr.
- Music by: Jerry M. Anga
- Production companies: Pop Moviehouse; Newsline Philippines
- Distributed by: Solar Pictures
- Release date: August 13, 2025
- Running time: 112 minutes
- Country: Philippines
- Language: Filipino

Sa Likod ng Tsapa (The Story of Col. Hansel M. Marantan) (lit. 'Beneath the Badge') is a 2025 Philippine action documentary drama film directed and written by Editha Z. Caduaya under Pop Moviehouse and Newsline Philippines and starring Hansel M. Marantan and Stefanio Rabino. The film tackles the career of Marantan who is a personnel of the Philippine National Police since 1999.

Released on August 13, 2025, the film is the first Davao-based production to secure nationwide theatrical release through Solar Pictures.

== Cast ==
- Hansel Marantan as himself; A police colonel in the Philippine National Police (PNP). Marantan considers his work on the documentary film as an "act of forgiveness" to his enemies. Marantan preferred Bong Revilla to play him in a film.
- Stefanio Rabino as Young Hansel Marantan; A PNP officer himself with the rank of lieutenant colonel, Rabino considers Marantan as his idol.
- Nicolas Torre as himself; the PNP chief at the time of the film's release who had worked with Marantan before.

== Production ==
Editha Caduaya, a veteran journalist, served as the director, writer, and a producer for Sa Likod ng Tsapa as part of a documentary film project for Davao City-based Newsline Philippines and Pop Moviehouse.

Sa Likod ng Tsapa was about Hansel Marantan, an Ilocano police colonel who works for the Philippine National Police who had various assignments in Luzon and Mindanao. He was directly involved in the production as an interviewee. The film covered operations Marantan was involved in as a police officer from 1999 including the 2008 Parañaque shootout, 2013 Atimonan shootout where Marantan himself was accused of a crime he was acquitted of in 2025, the 2024 service of search warrants concerning alleged mastermind of the Pamplona massacre Arnie Teves, and the 2024 arrest of Apollo Quiboloy.

Caduaya disclosed that 16 hours worth of interview footage was recorded for the film. Marantan remarked that filming had to pause several times due to him recalling events in his career becoming too emotional at times.

Marantan positioned the film as a platform to show the "human side" of the law enforcers, lamenting how their actions are "politicized". In the 2008 shootout for example, he recalled how the policed involved were charged for collateral damage an act which discourages young police offers.

== Release ==
Sa Likod ng Tsapa was released in cinemas in the Philippines on August 13, 2025, under the distribution of Solar Pictures.

Parts of the proceeds went to the women and children's desk of the Davao City Police Office as well as disability advocacy organizations.

Release of the film overseas is also planned.
