= Nine Media News and Current Affairs =

Defunct news and current affairs division of Nine Media Corporation

- Division of: Solar Entertainment Corporation (2011-14); Nine Media Corporation (2014-24)
- Former names: Solar News and Current Affairs/Solar News; 9News and Current Affairs/9News
- Predecessor: KBS News Department/RPN News and Public Affairs (1969-2012, in-house)
- Country: Philippines
- Area served: Defunct
- Key people: Pal Marquez (Senior Vice President for Operations); Benjamin Ramos (President, Nine Media Corporation and President and CEO, Radio Philippines Network); Pia Hontiveros (Chief Correspondent); Rico Hizon (Senior Anchor, and Director for News Content Development)
- Headquarters: Ground Floor, Worldwide Corporate Center, EDSA cor. Shaw Boulevard, Mandaluyong City, Philippines
- Language: English (main); Filipino (secondary)
- Formed: March 2, 2011; 15 years ago
- Launched: January 16, 2012; 14 years ago
- Dissolved: January 31, 2024; 2 years ago
- Successor: TV5 News (outsourced news programs); NewsWatch Plus (news operations and assets)
- Fate: Most of the operations and assets were sold and folded to MediaQuest/TV5 Network's News5; remaining spun out into NewsWatch Plus.

Nine Media News and Current Affairs (formerly known as Solar News and Current Affairs/Solar News and 9News and Current Affairs/9News) is the now-defunct news and current affairs division of the Philippine media company Nine Media Corporation, leased its news programming content for Southern Broadcasting Network (2011–2013) and Radio Philippines Network (2012–2014). The division produces local news and content for its free-to-air television channels TalkTV, Solar News Channel, 9TV, and CNN Philippines.

Launched on March 2, 2011, as a result of RPN's privatization. It ended its operations alongside CNN Philippines on January 31, 2024, due to financial losses. Meanwhile, TV5 Network's TV5 News and NewsWatch Plus took over its role of supplying news content for RPN and its affiliate RPTV.

== History ==
=== As Solar News (2012-2014) ===
Solar News was formed on March 2, 2011, along with the launch of TalkTV. The formation of the news department came after Solar Entertainment acquired 34% controlling stake of Radio Philippines Network (RPN) from the Philippine Government as part of RPN/IBC privatization in 2011. On July 16, 2012, Solar News launched its first local newscast Solar Network News, followed by Solar Nightly News, an hourly Solar News Update, Solar Daybreak, and Solar Newsday.

On October 30, 2012, after RPN ceased its production of NewsWatch and NewsCap due to impending retrenchment of its employees brought by the network's privatization, two newscasts began airing simultaneously on RPN (then-affiliated by ETC). On the same day, TalkTV rebranded as Solar News Channel on SBN 21, which ran until November 30, 2013, before it transferred to RPN the following day.

=== As 9News (2014-2015) ===
In November 2013, San Miguel Corporation President and COO Ramon S. Ang interested to acquire a majority stake in Solar Television Network as well as its stake on RPN. The Tieng family were the majority stockholders then of STVNI.

On August 20, 2014, Solar Entertainment chair Wilson Tieng announced that they sold the entire share of Solar TV Network, including its 34% controlling stake of RPN, to Amb. Antonio Cabangon-Chua, owner of radio network Aliw Broadcasting Corporation and business newspaper BusinessMirror, citing the company's financial losses while investing the network.

To reflect the change of ownership, and upon announcement of the rebranding of Solar News Channel into 9TV by August 23, Solar News also rebranded to 9News, retaining its news and current affairs programming as 9TV expanded its weekend programming.

=== As CNN Philippines (2015-2024) ===
CNN Philippines logo from March 15, 2015, until January 31, 2024.

9News underwent a major overhaul in 2015, as parent Nine Media Corporation signed a five-year brand licensing agreement (later extended until the end of 2024) with Turner Broadcasting System/Warner Bros. Discovery to share resources with CNN to integrate the latter's content and 9News's reporting as CNN Philippines, which launched on March 16, 2015.

=== Closure ===
On January 25, 2024, Media Newser Philippines reported that Nine Media and CNN were closing down CNN Philippines by mutual agreement due to financial losses, as well as poor ratings of the network and loss of advertisers' support.

Nine Media News and Current Affairs was dissolved a week late, on January 31, 2024. The division's live news operations had ceased on January 29, citing financial losses and a shift in focus to the operations of their sister channel, Aliw Channel 23.

On the same day, after CNN Philippines signed off at 10:00 p.m., TV5 Network took over RPN's airtime and formally launched its replacement channel RPTV the following day. Its news programs are now outsourced from TV5's news division, News5, acquiring the latter's former news operations and assets. On July 1, 2024, CNN Philippines' operations and assets, as well as its current affairs archives, were handled over to the newly created NewsWatch Plus, a digital news service created by Nine Media Corporation's indirect parent company Broadreach Media Holdings, Inc. and independently managed by former staff of CNN Philippines. The said launch was the revival of former RPN's in-house flagship newscast, which was defunct 11 years ago. Its current affairs archives will be seen initially on online and digital platform starting from July 1, 2024, and later on TV (via RPTV and Aliw Channel 23). Other several personalities and remaining staff who are not part of its successor outlet, however, were later resurfaced either News5, ABS-CBN News and Current Affairs (which took over the CNN Philippines' role of supplying news content for AMBS' All TV since April 15, 2024), GMA News, Presidential Communications Office (through RPN's half-sister companies PTV and IBC), or Prage's newly launched Bilyonaryo News Channel.

== See also ==
- Radio Philippines Network
- Government of the Philippines
- Presidential Communications Office
- TV5 Network
- News5
- Nine Media Corporation
- Solar Entertainment Corporation (former division)
- Solar News Channel
- 9TV
- CNN Philippines
- Talk TV
- Southern Broadcasting Network (former leased airtime)
