= RPTV (TV channel) =

Philippine free-to-air television channel

- Logo used since February 1, 2024
- Type: Free-to-air television network
- Country: Philippines
- Network: TV5; RPN 9
- Stations: List of RPTV stations
- Affiliates: NewsWatch Plus
- Headquarters: For TV5: TV5 Media Center, Reliance cor. Sheridan Sts., Mandaluyong, Metro Manila, Philippines; For Nine Media/RPN: JMT Building Condominium, 27 ADB Avenue, Ortigas Center, Pasig, Metro Manila, Philippines

Programming
- Languages: Filipino (main); English (secondary)
- Picture format: 720p/1080i HDTV (downscaled to 16:9 480i for the SDTV feed)

Ownership
- Owner: MediaQuest Holdings, Inc. (PLDT Beneficial Trust Fund); Nine Media Corporation (ALC Group of Companies)
- Parent: TV5 Network, Inc. (Programming and Broadcast Facilities); Radio Philippines Network (Broadcast Spectrum and License)
- Key people: Benjamin Ramos (President, Nine Media Corporation, Broadreach Media Holdings and Aliw Broadcasting Corporation and President and CEO, RPN); Manuel V. Pangilinan (Chairman, TV5 Network, Inc. and MediaQuest Holdings, Inc.); Victorico P. Vargas (President and CEO, MediaQuest Holdings, Inc. and TV5 Network, Inc.)
- Sister channels: Through TV5: TV5; One Sports; Kapatid Channel; AksyonTV International; PBA Rush Through NMC/ALC Group: Aliw Channel 23; DWIZ News TV

History
- Launched: February 1, 2024; 2 years ago (soft launch); March 4, 2024; 2 years ago (official launch)
- Replaced: CNN Philippines (RPN channel space); One PH (TV5 DTT sub-channel space); One Sports (UHF 29 Cebu, Cagayan de Oro, and Davao channel space); SolarFlix (Cignal TV channel renumbering space); One Screen (Cignal TV channel space)
- Replaced by: Cine Mo! (Cablelink channel space); WilTV (Cignal TV channel space); One Sports (UHF 29 Cagayan de Oro channel space)
- Former names: C/S 9 (2008–09); Solar TV (2009–11); ETC (2011–13); Solar News Channel (2013–14); 9TV (2014–15); CNN Philippines (2015–24)

Availability

Terrestrial
- Analog VHF/UHF: Listings may vary
- Digital UHF: Channel 18.2 (TV5 DTT); Channel 19.1 (RPN DTT)
- Sulit TV: Channel 2
- Sky Cable: Channel 14 (Mega Manila); Channel 6 (Regional)
- Converge Vision / SkyTV (Metro Manila): Channel 9
- Sky Direct (Nationwide): Channel 6
- Cignal TV (Nationwide): Channel 9 (SD); Channel 259 (HD)
- SatLite (Nationwide): Channel 9
- G Sat (Nationwide): Channel 3
- Cablelink (Metro Manila, Cavite, Laguna, Bulacan, Tarlac): Channel 61

Streaming media
- Cignal Play: Available on the Cignal Play website or via mobile application

RPTV is a Philippine commercial free-to-air television network. It is jointly owned and operated by TV5 Network, Inc., and Nine Media Corporation, with Radio Philippines Network (RPN) serving as its free-to-air broadcaster. RPTV was established through a content distribution, sales, and marketing agreement between TV5 (under its parent company MediaQuest Holdings) and Nine Media. Under this arrangement, TV5 provides programming and related services to Nine Media through its existing airtime lease agreement with RPN.

RPTV officially launched on 1 February 2024, replacing CNN Philippines on its flagship station, DZKB-TV channel 9 (the latter frequency previously used by ABS-CBN from 1958 to 1969). This followed the termination of the brand licensing agreement between Nine Media and CNN (under its parent company Warner Bros. Discovery), resulting in CNN Philippines' closure on 31 January 2024.

== History ==
=== Background ===
Prior to the launch, on December 22, 2023, TV5 Network entered into a blocktime agreement with Nine Media Corporation to air Eat Bulaga!—the Philippines' longest-running noontime variety and entertainment show—along with select games from the Philippine Basketball Association (PBA) every Saturday and Sunday on CNN Philippines starting January 6, 2024. This marked the return of these programs to RPN, where they had aired previously (with the Eat Bulaga! cases also marking the historic return of the traditional Mondays to Saturdays noontime slot on Channel 9 to its origin as ABS-CBN roots, dating back from the premiere of Student Canteen in 1958 on these timeslot and frequency, as the Channel 9 frequency in Manila were previously held by ABS-CBN from 1958 to 1969 before it handed over to RPN).

This blocktime partnership lasted until January 25, 2024, when Nine Media and CNN mutually agreed to terminate their brand licensing agreement amid financial difficulties and loss of advertising support. CNN Philippines announced later that month that it would shut down on January 31, citing financial losses.

=== Launch ===
On January 31, 2024, after CNN Philippines signed off at 10:00 pm (after airing its last program, Building Bridges), TV5 Network took over the entire RPN-9 airtime. This included a test broadcast unveiling RPTV as its replacement (with RPTV's looping logo played after CNN Philippines signed off). The takeover was later confirmed during TV5's late-night newscast, Frontline Tonight. However, it was not until February 6, 2024, at the TV5 Media Center, that MediaQuest, TV5, and Nine Media formalized a content distribution, sales, and marketing services agreement for the new channel. RPN retains the license and transmission operations for the network, as current ownership restrictions limit the number of stations a franchise holder can own in a specific media market.

RPTV's first commercial broadcast commenced on February 1, 2024, at 6:00 am with Ted Failon at DJ Chacha sa Radyo5 as its inaugural program. At the same time, RPTV replaced One PH on DTT subchannels across TV5-owned and Mediascape-affiliated stations, with One PH reverting its availability via Cignal TV, Streamtech-owned Planet Cable and other cable and satellite platforms. However, One PH would resume its free-to-air broadcast on channel 51 on August 29, 2026.

== Programming ==
RPTV's programming consists of simulcasts and reruns of select shows from TV5 and its sister channel One PH, sporting events and programs by One Sports/Sports5 as well as other channels owned by its cable provider Cignal TV. This includes Eat Bulaga! along with the PBA, NBA, NCAA Philippines and UAAP games, which were previously aired on RPN (Eat Bulaga! and the NBA, NCAA Philippines and UAAP games were previously also aired on the original Channel 9 user from 1958 to 1969, ABS-CBN, which frequently shares several programs with RPN). The network also features TV5's flagship newscast Frontline Pilipinas along with its lead-in Una sa Lahat. RPTV carries reruns of current affairs programs from CNN Philippines, now handled by Nine Media's parent company, Broadreach Media, through NewsWatch Plus.

The return of One PH programs on RPTV also marks the revival of content previously aired on 105.9 True FM (formerly 92.3 Radyo5 True FM) following the closure of the news and sports channel AksyonTV five years prior.

== Technical facilities ==
RPTV broadcasts from its studios and main broadcast facilities at the TV5 Media Center in the corner of Reliance and Sheridan Streets in Mandaluyong. It also maintains relay technical facilities at the RPN Digital Transmitter Complex, Crestview Heights Subdivision, Brgy. San Roque, Antipolo, Rizal. This relay facility is the primary feed for RPN transmitters (some of these were previously owned and operated by ABS-CBN), pay television providers, and direct-to-home (DTH) satellite providers, including MediaQuest-owned Cignal TV (standard definition feed), ABS-CBN Corporation-owned Sky Cable, Converge ICT-owned Vision, and Streamtech-owned Planet Cable. Meanwhile, DTT transmitters owned by TV5 and Mediascape receive the channel directly from the Reliance master control.

The network operates daily from 6:00 am to 12:00 midnight PHT and goes off-air annually during Holy Week, from Maundy Thursday to Black Saturday.

== Availability ==
RPTV is available on RPN's flagship station DZKB-TV (Channel 9) in Metro Manila, as well as on seven regional VHF TV stations. It is also accessible via TV5's main digital TV channels in selected areas in the Philippines in major cities and through Mediascape-owned DTT affiliates. Some time after launch, stations owned by MediaQuest-owned Nation Broadcasting Corporation in Cebu, Cagayan De Oro, and Davao (both previously affiliated as MTV Philippines, AksyonTV, 5 Plus and later One Sports) were converted into mirror feeds of the new channel.

Upon its launch, RPTV was available exclusively in high definition over the air via RPN's digital UHF Channel 19 in Metro Manila. On 14 March 2024, Cignal TV announced via its social media platforms that RPTV, along with its sister sports channel One Sports, would be available in the HD format. The HD feed of RPTV was officially launched on the platform the following day. Unlike the standard definition channel, RPTV HD on Cignal is a direct feed from the TV5 Media Center playout facility.

RPN transmitters outside of Manila are also in the process of launching DTT services for RPTV, with Baguio City being the first provincial DTT outlet, which began broadcasting in May 2024.

Callsign	TV	Type	Transmitter location
DZKB	9 (Note: Formerly owned by ABS-CBN from 1958 to 1969.) (analog); 19 (Note: Digital transmitter site in Antipolo, Rizal.) (digital)	Originating	Quezon City
DZBS	12 (analog); 19 (digital)	Relay	Tuba, Benguet
DWKI	10 (analog)	Relay	Iriga
DYKB	8 (analog)	Relay	Bacolod
DYKC	9 (analog)	Relay	Mandaue
DYAN (Note: Owned by Nation Broadcasting Corporation.)	29 (analog)	Relay	Cebu City
DXWW	9 (analog)	Relay	Davao City
DXAN	29 (analog)	Relay	Davao City
DXXX	5 (analog)	Relay	Zamboanga City

== See also ==
- ABS-CBN, the original owner of Channel 9 frequency in Manila from 1958 to 1969
  - Kapamilya Channel
- TV5
- One News
- One Sports
- One PH
- BuKo
- Sari-Sari Channel
- Kapatid Channel
- Radio Philippines Network
- CNN Philippines
- Solar TV
- SolarFlix (formerly ETC)
- C/S 9
- Solar News Channel
- 9TV
- AKTV
- AksyonTV
- Fox Filipino
- Aliw Broadcasting Corporation
  - Aliw Channel 23
