= Solar News Channel =

Defunct Television network in the Philippines

- Type: Broadcast commercial television network
- Country: Philippines
- Availability: Defunct
- Broadcast area: Nationwide
- Owner: Solar Entertainment Corporation (STVNI/Nine Media)
- Key people: Wilson Tieng (Chairman, Radio Philippines Network, Solar Television Network); William Tieng (President, Solar Television Network); Jing Magsaysay (Senior Vice President for News and Current Affairs head); Robert T. Rivera (President and CEO, Radio Philippines Network)
- Launch date: October 30, 2012; 13 years ago
- Dissolved: August 22, 2014; 12 years ago
- Picture format: NTSC 480i (SDTV)
- Sister channels: ETC; 2nd Avenue; Jack City
- Affiliations: Southern Broadcasting Network (2012–13) (50%); Radio Philippines Network (2013–14) (34%)
- Official website: Solar News
- Language: English (main); Filipino, Cebuano, Kapampangan (secondary)
- Replaced: Talk TV (UHF Channel 21 space); ETC (VHF Channel 9 space)
- Replaced by: ETC (UHF Channel 21 space); 9TV (VHF Channel 9 space)

Solar News Channel (SNC) was the Philippine free-to-air television channel owned by Solar Entertainment Corporation and Nine Media Corporation (formerly Solar Television Network), leased airtime from Southern Broadcasting Network (2012–2013) and Radio Philippines Network (2013–2014). The station was operational 18 hours a day from 6:00 AM to midnight on free TV, while being available 24 hours on cable, satellite and internet TV providers.

The channel was carried over on SBN's flagship DWCP-TV (2012-13) and RPN's flagship DZKB-TV (2013-14).

SNC local programming and master control originate at Upper Ground Floor of the Worldwide Corporate Center, Shaw Boulevard corner Epifanio de los Santos Avenue in Mandaluyong.

The channel ceased broadcasting on August 22, 2014, and was replaced by 9TV.

== History ==
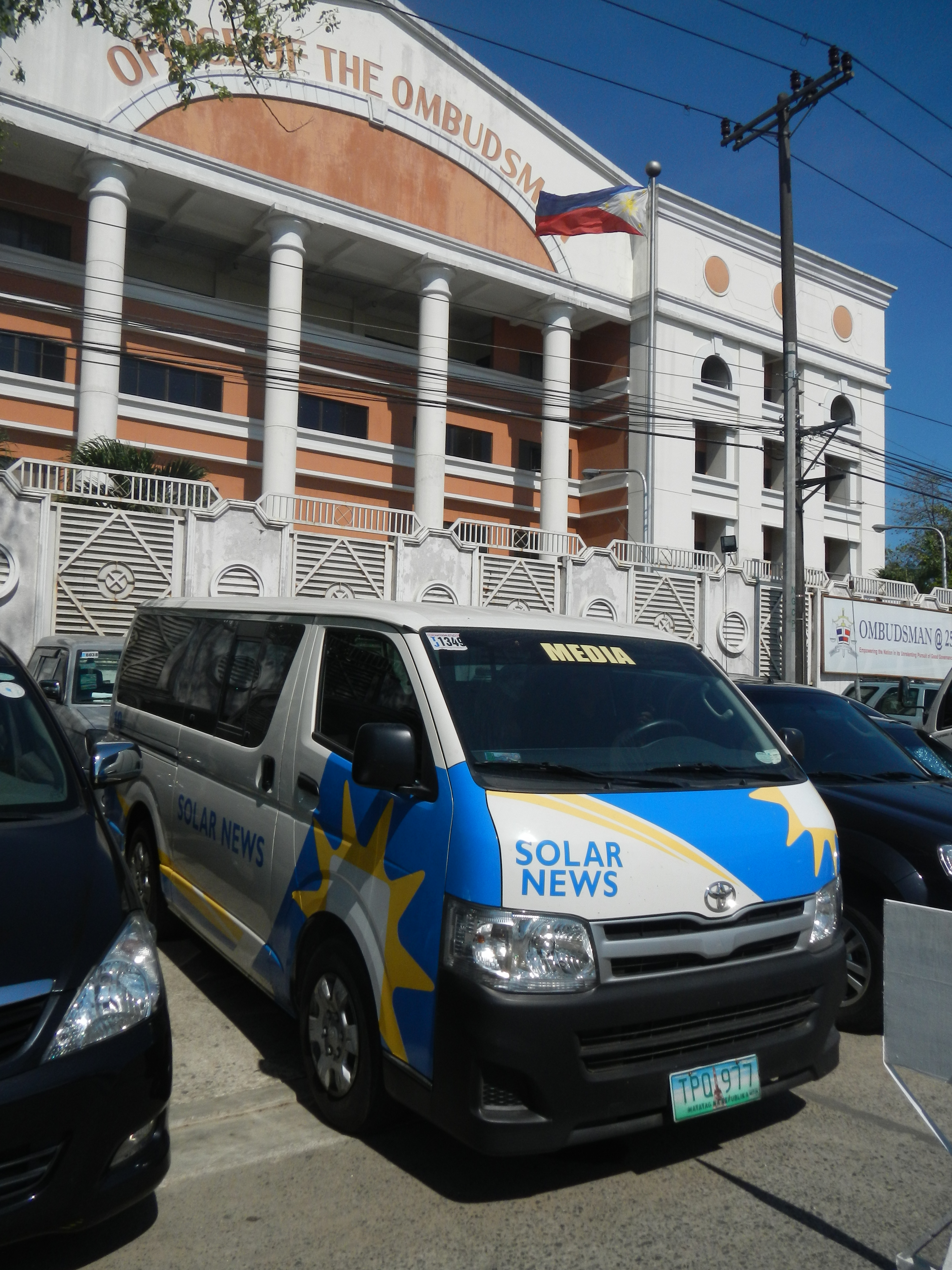
A Toyota HiAce van used by Solar News parked at the Office of the Ombudsman.

The network debuted on October 30, 2012, at 5:45 AM (UTC +8:00), as a replacement for then all-news channel Talk TV on SBN 21—as such it was broadcast by all television service provider and terrestrial stations which formerly carried Talk TV.

It is the first all-English news channel to be aired on free TV in the Philippines, and the first channel of Solar Entertainment to air both on cable and free TV. Major part of the programming are local programs including news and current affairs programs from Solar News and foreign programs from NBC and CBS.

On November 30, 2013, Solar News Channel switched its affiliation to RPN to expand its nationwide coverage while ETC returned to SBN.

Aside from the transfer, Solar News Channel launched its own mobile application for smartphone users. Its consists of features such as live streaming, catch-up episodes and latest news from the network's website, solarnews.ph.

On August 13, 2014, as part of acquisition of STVNI and RPN by the ALC Group of Companies led by Ambassador Antonio Cabangon-Chua, Solar TV announced that the channel will rebrand as 9TV, dropping the "Solar" branding in all of its assets.

== Programming ==
Solar News Channel's programming consists of rolling news coverage and other news programming, along with documentaries, current affairs show, talk show, entertainment, sports news. Most of the foreign programs on this news channel are from American TV networks such as NBC and CBS, with programs dedicated for infomercials, religious, pre-school, and children's programs.

=== Kids programming ===
- Sesame Street
- Beware The Batman
- Care Bears
- Strawberry Shortcake: Berry Bitty Adventures
- Young Justice
- Pokémon the Series: XY

=== News programming ===
- Solar Daybreak
- News.PH
- Serbisyo All Access
- Sports Desk
- MedTalk

== See also ==
- Radio Philippines Network
- SolarFlix
- Jack City
- Solar Entertainment Corporation
- Nine Media News and Current Affairs
- CNN Philippines
- Nine Media Corporation
