= Southern Broadcasting Network =

Philippine media company

Southern Broadcasting Network, Inc.
- Type: Private (1992-2010); Subsidiary (2010-present)
- Industry: Mass media
- Founded: 1977; 49 years ago (radio); May 30, 1992; 34 years ago (television)
- Headquarters: Worldwide Corporate Center, EDSA corner Shaw Boulevard, Mandaluyong, Philippines
- Area served: Nationwide
- Key people: Wilson Y. Tieng (Chairman); William Y. Tieng (President); Linnie M. Dinopol (Vice President)
- Services: Broadcasting; Radio; Television
- Parent: Solar Entertainment Corporation

SBN 21
- Type: Free-to-air television network
- Country: Philippines
- Broadcast area: Nationwide
- Affiliates: Solar Flix (2022–present); ETC (2008–11, 2013–22); Talk TV (2011–12); Solar News Channel (2012–13)
- Headquarters: Worldwide Corporate Center, EDSA corner Shaw Boulevard, Mandaluyong, Philippines

Programming
- Picture format: 480i (16:9 SDTV)

Ownership
- Owner: Nine Media Corporation (broadcast operations and assets) (2010-2014)
- Parent: Gem Communications Holdings (1992–2010); Solar Entertainment Corporation (2010–present)
- Key people: Current Management; Wilson Y. Tieng (Chairman); William Y. Tieng (President); Former Management; Lucio Co (Majority Stockholder); Leonardo B. Dayao (Chairman); Teofilo A. Henson (President)

History
- Launched: May 30, 1992; 34 years ago
- Founder: Lucio Co
- Former names: World TV 21 (1992–96)

Southern Broadcasting Network, Inc. (SBN) is a Filipino media company based in Mandaluyong, Philippines. SBN is a subsidiary of Solar Entertainment Corporation, a Filipino-owned television company managed by the Tieng family.

Its main broadcast facilities are located at the Third Floor, Worldwide Corporate Center, EDSA corner Shaw Boulevard, Mandaluyong.

Southern Broadcasting Network operates television stations with airtime being leased by its parent Solar Entertainment, serving as primary broadcasters of movie and entertainment channel SolarFlix.

== History ==
=== World TV/SBN era (1992–2007) ===
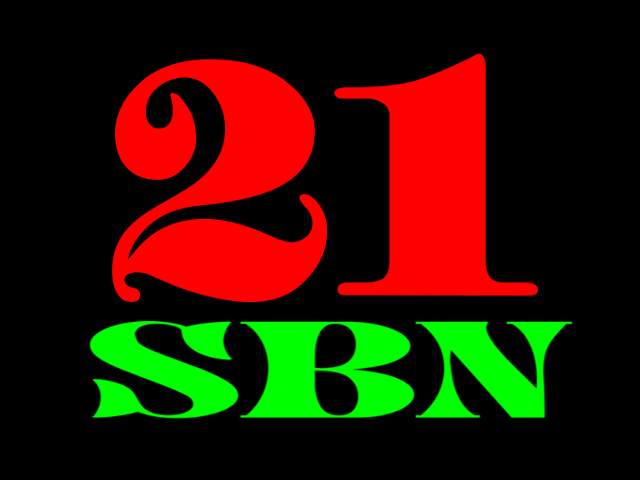
SBN 21 Logo from 1996 to 2005.

SBN was founded by Gem Communications Holdings Corporation (GemCom) majority owned by Filipino-Chinese tycoon Lucio Co, founder of supermarket chain Puregold Price Club Inc. with 97% share. Leonardo B. Dayao and Teofilo A. Henson served as chairman and president of SBN, respectively.

The Davao-based broadcast company launched DWCP-TV channel 21, on May 30, 1992, becoming the first local UHF TV station in Metro Manila. It was then known as World TV 21, which was operated by the Kampana Television Corporation, providing programming content from ABC, ESPN and CNN.

On September 7, 1995, SBN was granted a 25-year legislative franchise under Republic Act No. 8147, albeit without Philippine President Fidel V. Ramos' signature as the bill lapsed into law after 30 days of inaction.

In 2000, SBN started airing Ang Dating Daan after transferring from PTV, as well as informative and educational programs, and the most notable program during the network's popularity, SBN Music Videos, which later evolved as SBN 21 Live, a videoke oriented program. In 2001, the Iglesia ni Cristo launched its own program, Ang Tamang Daan, as a direct response to Ang Dating Daan, featuring video footages and recordings of ADD hosts as issues were tackled. Over time the animosity between the two groups has intensified, and their relationship has been severely strained. The Quezon City Regional Trial Court on Wednesday ordered televangelist Bro. Eliseo Soriano of Ang Dating Daan to pay the Iglesia ni Cristo, P100,000 in moral damages for libel committed 10 years ago. Branch 92 Judge Eleuterio Bathan also directed him to pay a fine of P6,000 each for two counts of libel. He ruled the elements of libel have been established in the case filed by INC over Soriano's pronouncement on a television program on April 25, 2003, and the replay on April 27 on the same timeslot during the live program of Ang Dating Daan on SBN.

The case stemmed from a complaint filed by members of the Iglesia ni Cristo, including its minister Michael Sandoval, due to statements of Soriano aired on August 10 referring to the minister. By 2004, Ang Dating Daan transferred to UNTV, while Ang Tamang Daan moved to the INC's secular television station Net 25.

Aside from Ang Dating Daan and Ang Tamang Daan, the channel also aired other religious programs like "Oras ng Himala" (hosted by Apostle Renato Carillo), "Oras ng Katotohanan" (produced by the Pentecostal Missionary Church of Christ (4th Watch)), and selected programs of ACQ-KBN (owned by Pastor Apollo Quiboloy) during primetime hours.

=== As a Solar's subsidiary (2008–present) ===
==== Blocktime agreement and subsequent purchase by Solar ====
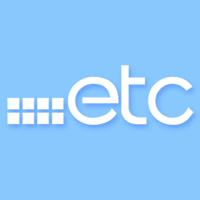
ETC-21 logo from December 12, 2009, to March 1, 2011, from November 30, 2013, to July 27, 2014.

On January 1, 2008, Solar Entertainment Corporation began to lease airtime on SBN, choosing to broadcast programming from its entertainment channel ETC. Months prior to the deal, SkyCable stated that they would offer less "redundant" programming and feature more series that had never been aired in the country before, but reports surfaced that channels operated by Solar were pulled due to a dispute; SkyCable's owner, ABS-CBN Corporation, believed that Solar's lower fees for advertising on its channels were causing ABS-CBN to lose revenue. The new blocktime deal between SBN, Radio Philippines Network, Rajah Broadcasting Network, and Solar is said to be a part of the latter's retaliation to Sky.

In mid-2010, GemCom divested all of its 97% equity share in SBN to Solar Entertainment for Php 368.8 million. Since then, SBN became a fully owned subsidiary of Solar.

Talk TV logo from March 2, 2011, to October 29, 2012.

When Solar TV ventured as a Solar's broadcast television arm, after Solar acquired a 34% majority stake of Radio Philippines Network from the Philippine government as a part of RPN/IBC privatization in 2011, ETC was transferred from SBN to RPN. Meanwhile, SBN and Solar created news and talk channel Talk TV, with both parties enjoying a 50% share of the channel. The newly created channel conducted its test broadcast until March 31, 2011, with full operation commencing on April 1, 2011. By January 16, 2012, Talk TV became the first home of Solar's newly created division, Solar News. The first local news event covered was the Renato Corona impeachment trial. On October 30, Talk TV was relaunched as the Solar News Channel. Though it was claimed as "the first 24-hour English news channel on free-to-air TV", SBN (who holds free-to-air broadcast rights of SNC) never materialized SNC's slogan.

On December 1, 2013, Solar News Channel moved to RPN to allow SNC's wider coverage, while ETC returned to SBN a day before. (SNC and RPN, however, were sold to ALC Group of Companies chair, the late Amb. Antonio Cabangon Chua, in August the following year, due to the Tieng's loss of revenue after investing on RPN.)

On July 26, 2019, Philippine President Rodrigo Duterte signed Republic Act No. 11354 which renewed SBN's legislative franchise for another 25 years. The law granted SBN a franchise to construct, install, operate, and maintain, for commercial purposes, radio broadcasting stations and television stations, including digital television system, with the corresponding facilities such as relay stations, throughout the Philippines.

== Stations ==
=== TV Stations ===
==== Digital ====
Branding	Callsign	Channel	Power	Frequency	Transmitter Site
SolarFlix Manila	DWCP	21	3 kW	515.143 MHz	Solar Entertainment Complex, along Nuestra Señora de la Paz Subdivision, Barangay Sta. Cruz, Antipolo, Rizal

==== Cable ====
Provider	Channel	Coverage
SkyCable	16	Metro Manila
Cablelink	101	Metro Manila
Cignal TV	21	Nationwide
Satlite	21	Nationwide
G Sat Direct TV	23	Nationwide
FiliTV	8	Nationwide
Parasat	253	Regional

=== Radio Stations ===
==== FM Stations ====
Branding	Callsign	Frequency	Location	Operator
XFM Bacolod	DYCP	90.3 MHz	Bacolod	Y2H Broadcasting Network, Inc.
XFM Cebu	DYAP	88.3 MHz	Cebu City	Y2H Broadcasting Network, Inc.
