= SolarFlix =

Television network in the Philippines

- Type: Free-to-air television network
- Country: Philippines
- Broadcast area: Nationwide
- Network: SBN 21 (2008–present); RPN 9 (2011–2013)
- Headquarters: Solar Century Tower, 100 Tordesillas St., Corner H.V. Dela Costa St. Salcedo Village, Makati, Metro Manila, Philippines

Programming
- Languages: Tagalog (main); English (secondary, primary for Reel Time)
- Picture format: 16:9 480i (SDTV)

Ownership
- Owner: Solar Entertainment Corporation
- Parent: Nine Media Corporation (2010–2014); Southern Broadcasting Network (2008–present); Radio Philippines Network (2011–2013)
- Sister channels: DepEd TV; E-Novation TV; Solar Sports

History
- Launched: March 1, 2004; 22 years ago (as ETC); July 11, 2022; 4 years ago (as SolarFlix)
- Closed: July 11, 2022; 4 years ago (as ETC)
- Former names: SBN (May 30, 1992 – December 1, 2013); ETC (March 1, 2004 – July 11, 2022)

Availability

Terrestrial
- SBN O&O stations: Digital: Channel 21 (Metro Manila) (LCN: 21.02)
- SkyCable Metro Manila: Channel 16
- SkyTV Metro Manila: Channel 21
- Sky Direct Metro Manila: Channel 14
- Cignal TV Nationwide: Channel 21
- SatLite Nationwide: Channel 21
- G Sat Nationwide: Channel 23

SolarFlix (formerly Entertainment Central or ETC) is a Philippine free-to-air television network owned by the Southern Broadcasting Network, a subsidiary of Solar Entertainment Corporation. Its digital free-to-air broadcast is carried by SBN's flagship station, DWCP-DTV (channel 21) in Metro Manila. The channel's analog broadcast is available on its lone provincial TV station, DXSS-TV (channel 7) in Davao City. SolarFlix is also carried by several cable and satellite providers, including Sky Cable, Destiny Cable, Cablelink, Binangonan Cable TV Corporation, Cignal, SatLite, Sky Direct, and G Sat, along with various provincial cable operators. More recently, the channel has been made available through online streaming.

SolarFlix operates daily from 8:00 a.m. to midnight on digital free TV, and is broadcast 24 hours a day on most paid television and streaming service providers. Following the 2021 Holy Week in the Philippines, the channel has begun singing off from Holy Thursday to Easter Sunday at 8:00 a.m., citing religious reasons. The channel previously operated daily from 5:00 a.m. to midnight on free-to-air analog TV until September 2019, when SBN permanently closed its analog signal.

SolarFlix broadcasts from Solar Entertainment's studio headquarters, located at the Worldwide Corporate Center in Mandaluyong. Solar's office is located at the Solar Century Tower in Metro Manila. SBN delivers free-to-air broadcasts from its transmitter and tower site located in the Nuestra Señora de la Paz Subdivision of Antipolo, Rizal.

== History ==
=== Entertainment Central (2004–2022) ===
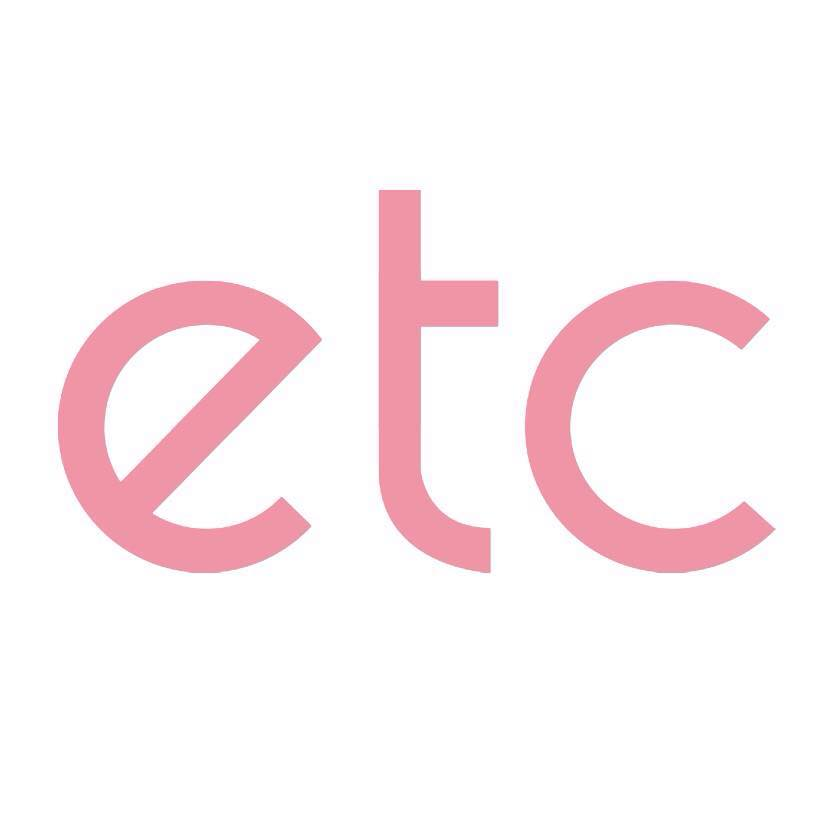
ETC logo from 2016 to 2022

On November 24, 2003, Solar Entertainment began a series of test broadcasts. These broadcasts culminated in the debut of ETC, launched as "Entertainment Central", on March 1, 2004. The channel was initially made available on Sky Cable.

==== Southern Broadcasting Network (2008–2011) ====
On January 1, 2008, ETC ceased airing as a separate channel on Sky Cable due to a carriage dispute. As part of Solar Entertainment's agreements with other terrestrial channels, ETC began airing on SBN's flagship DWCP-TV Channel 21, an ultra high frequency television station in the Philippines.

==== Radio Philippines Network (2011–2013) ====
In 2011, Solar TV Network, Inc. (the legal predecessor of Nine Media Corporation), a former broadcast TV arm subsidiary of Solar Entertainment, acquired a 34% stake in Radio Philippines Network from the Philippine government as part of RPN's ongoing privatization efforts. On March 2, ETC replaced Solar TV as the flagship programming channel of RPN. Meanwhile, Solar Entertainment launched Talk TV on the same day as a part of its news department. On October 30, 2012, Talk TV rebranded as the Solar News Channel.

==== Return to SBN (2013–present) ====
ETC returned to SBN on November 30, 2013. The following day, Solar News Channel shifted to RPN in order to enhance its nationwide coverage. However, RPN, was subsequently sold to the ALC Group of Companies, chaired by Ambassador Antonio Cabangon Chua, in August 2014. Following the sale, Solar News Channel was rebranded as 9TV.

ETC's sister channel, 2nd Avenue, ceased broadcasting on June 5, 2018 after 12 years on air. Many of its programs subsequently moved to ETC. On November 21, 2018, ETC unveiled a new station ID and on-air graphics package. At the same time, the network launched two new slogans, In Full Bloom and #IamETC.

On May 25, 2020, ETC began broadcasting in anamorphic widescreen on free-to-air digital television, with a new 16:9 aspect ratio. This change was undertaken in order to optimize the viewing experience for viewers with compatible widescreen televisions.

=== As SolarFlix (2022–present) ===
On June 7, 2022, SBN announced the addition of a new channel with a teaser stating: "May bagong kakaaliwan ngayong July. Kaya tutok lang. Sagot ka namin!" (transl. "There is something new to entertain you this July. So tune in, and we'll be there for you!"). On June 16, ETC was officially relaunched as SolarFlix at 6:00 p.m. The new broadcast debuted as a Tagalog movie channel, featuring classic and independent Filipino films as well as documentaries from local movie festivals. Following the rebrand, Solar Entertainment Corporation informed select cable and satellite TV operators carrying ETC that the channel would be replaced by Jungo TV's ScreamFlix on June 20, 2022. ScreamFlix currently carries the Front Row Channel and Hallypop; the latter channel was previously broadcast as a digital sub-channel on the GMA Network.

== Programming ==
SolarFlix's programming is intended to target the young adult demographic, and currently consists of a selection of Turkish dramas and Latin American telenovelas dubbed in Tagalog alongside classic and independent Filipino films. The channel also broadcasts films from Hollywood and other foreign film studios.

SolarFlix and its predecessor ETC have made efforts to position themselves as female-oriented entertainment channels. According to AGB Nielsen, ETC was the top-ranked television channel among women in the Philippines in the first half of 2012, with a 10.33% audience share.

== See also ==
- Nine Media Corporation
- Solar Entertainment Corporation
- Radio Philippines Network
- Southern Broadcasting Network
- Nine Media News and Current Affairs
- DWCP-DTV
- Front Row Channel
- Solar TV
- Solar News Channel
- 9TV
