= Radio Philippines Network =

Philippine television network

Radio Philippines Network, Inc.
- Logo used 1981 – 1989 and again since 1995
- Formerly: Kanlaon Broadcasting System (1968–1975)
- Type: Private
- Industry: Broadcasting
- Founded: June 29, 1960; 66 years ago
- Founder: James Lindenberg
- Headquarters: RPN Compound, No. 97 Panay Avenue, Brgy., South Triangle, Quezon City, Metro Manila, Philippines
- Key people: Benjamin Ramos (president and CEO); Robertson Ong (general manager)
- Owners: Nine Media Corporation (34%); Far East Managers and Investors (32%); Government of the Philippines (20%); Private stock (14%)
- Parent: ALC Group of Companies
- Website: www.rpnradio.com

Radio Philippines Network
- Type: Broadcast commercial radio and television network
- Country: Philippines
- Broadcast area: Nationwide
- Stations: List of RPN stations
- Affiliates: C/S 9 (2008–2009); Solar TV (2009–2011); ETC (2011–2013); Solar News Channel (2013–2014); 9TV (2014–2015); CNN Philippines (2015–2024); RPTV (2024–present)
- Headquarters: RPN Compound, No. 97 Panay Avenue, South Triangle, Quezon City, Metro Manila

Programming
- Languages: Filipino (main); English (secondary)
- Picture format: 1080i (HDTV)

Ownership
- Owner: Nine Media Corporation (34%); Far East Managers and Investors (32%); Government of the Philippines (20%); Private Stock (14%)
- Parent: Radio Philippines Network, Inc.
- Key people: Benjamin Ramos (president and CEO); Robertson Ong (general manager)

History
- Founded: June 29, 1960 (radio broadcasts); October 15, 1969 (television broadcasts)
- Founder: James Lindenberg
- Former names: Kanlaon Broadcasting System (1960–1975); New Vision 9 (1989–1994)

Links
- Website: www.rpnradio.com

Radio Philippines Network, Inc. (RPN) is a Philippine television and radio company based in Quezon City. It is currently owned through majority share by Nine Media Corporation of the ALC Group of Companies, along with the Presidential Communications Office (PCO), Far East Managers and Investors Inc. (owned by the family of Roberto Benedicto), and other private shareholders. The network's main offices and flagship transmitter are located at Panay Avenue, Brgy. South Triangle, Quezon City. Founded by James Lindenberg, and before its privatization, it was the sister network of the current government-owned and controlled Intercontinental Broadcasting Corporation. Both networks were sequestered after the 1986 People Power Revolution, and they were formerly an attached agency of the now-PCO, which retained 20% of RPN's non-controlling shares following privatization.

Radio Philippines Network operates television stations with airtime leased by its parent Nine Media and content provider TV5 Network, serving as primary broadcasters of free-to-air television channel RPTV. RPN also operates regional AM radio stations under the brand Radyo Ronda, serving as a partial affiliate of its sister station DWIZ in Metro Manila.

== History ==
=== As Kanlaon Broadcasting System (1960–1975) ===
==== Early years (1960–1972) ====
Radio Philippines Network was founded on February 25, 1960, by James Lindenberg, who is also credited as the founder of ABS-CBN. RPN was officially established when the Congress of the Philippines approved its franchise on June 19, 1960.

RPN initially operated as a radio network, with its first station, DZBI, based in Manila. By 1967, RPN had expanded to seven radio stations nationwide; these included DZRR and DZAX in Manila, DZBS in Baguio, DZTG in Tuguegarao, DZRL in Laoag (later relocated to Batac), DXXX in Zamboanga, and DXDX in Barangay Dadiangas. Ben Aniceto served as operations director of RPN during this time.

In the late 1960s, Lindenberg sold the network to Roberto Benedicto. The network rebranded itself as the Kanlaon Broadcasting System (KBS)—named after Mount Kanlaon on the island of Negros, Benedicto's hometown. On October 15, 1969, the network launched its flagship television station, KBS-9 Manila. KBS-12 Baguio followed later that year.

KBS's initial properties and equipment came from ABS-CBN, including its old headquarters and studios on Roxas Boulevard, along with Toshiba equipment that enabled color broadcasting. As a result, KBS was branded as Accucolor 9, becoming the first Philippine television network to broadcast in full color.

In 1970, KBS acquired a color-capable OB van (outside broadcast van) for remote broadcasts of major events, including news and sports coverage. The network also launched the series NewsWatch, replacing the short-lived program KBS Eyewitness Reports. During this period, broadcast hours were limited to late afternoons through around midnight, Monday through Saturday, with transmissions starting after midday on Sundays.

By 1971, KBS had established itself as an all-color network, operating ten provincial stations. These were located in Baguio (KBS-12), Laoag (KBS-2), Bicol (KBS-10 in Iriga), Iloilo (KBS-2), Bacolod (KBS-8), Cebu (KBS-9 in Mandaue), Davao (KBS-4), General Santos (KBS-7), and Butuan (KBS-4)—in addition to its flagship station, KBS-9 Manila.

==== Martial law KBS years and takeover of ABS-CBN (1972–1975) ====
On September 23, 1972, the KBS television and radio stations, as well as the newspaper publication Philippines Daily Express—all belonging to the Roberto Benedicto group—were allowed to operate during the martial law period. The former aired Wacky Races and Francisco Tatad's reading of Proclamation No. 1081, when most media outfits were closed down after the declaration of martial law with this proclamation by Ferdinand Marcos.

On September 28, 1972, Marcos ordered the takeover of ABS-CBN Broadcasting Corporation and turned its facilities over to KBS, controlled by Benedicto. ABS-CBN's facilities were later transferred from KBS to the government-owned Maharlika Broadcasting System. Crony-owned media companies broadcast or published news and entertainment meant to project a positive image of the dictatorship and to conceal its abuses.

In 1973, RPN brought the first slow-motion production machine to support live coverage of the Manila Industrial and Commercial Athletic Association (MICAA) basketball games. Color production with color-ready equipment enabled the government to invest in RPN for color coverage of national events, as then state network GTV (now PTV)—which began two years later after the start of martial law—was mostly monochrome before its first color broadcasts in 1976. In 1974, the KBS network grew with the opening of more stations in the following locations: Tuguegarao (KBS-9), Bayombong (KBS-7), Legazpi (KBS-2), Palawan (KBS-5), Roxas (KBS-7), Dumaguete (KBS-5 moved to RPN-8), Tacloban (KBS-5), Zamboanga (KBS-5), Dipolog (KBS-5), Pagadian (KBS-5), Ozamiz (KBS-13), Cagayan de Oro (KBS-5), Surigao (KBS-4) and Cotabato (KBS-10).

=== The first Radio Philippines Network (1975–1989) ===
==== Benedicto ownership (1975–1986) ====
In 1975, KBS was formally relaunched as RPN—the acronym for its franchise name, Radio Philippines Network. The RPN name was first used in provincial stations, before the RPN brand was later used for the Manila station as well; the KBS name was also used for other aspects of the network, such as KBS Sports until 1986.

The network covered special events such as the Olympic Games (the first sporting coverage to broadcast in full color) and the boxing match Thrilla in Manila in 1975. In addition, the network became the official broadcaster for the Miss Universe pageant held in Manila in 1974, and the first Metropop Song Festival and its succeeding editions from 1978. The network also headlined some top-rated programs such as John en Marsha (which both the media and academe regarded as the paradigm of development communication), Flordeluna, and Superstar (formerly known as The Nora Aunor-Eddie Peregrina Show). RPN was the birthplace and the first home of the now longest-running daytime variety show Eat Bulaga! (premiering in 1979). The network also headlined the longest-running game show on Philippine television, Family Kuarta o Kahon, hosted by Pepe Pimentel (originally airing on ABS-CBN, and then BBC-2); this program had enjoyed a successful 38-year run until the network finally canceled it in 2000.

The network pioneered the use of computer graphics for its program plugs and station IDs. It also became the only network in the country known for broadcasting an easily recognizable digital clock; this was embedded in the lower left part of the screen during the entire broadcast day except for newscasts, commercials, continuity plugs, station identification, and sign-off. This clock eventually became the centerpiece of the network's broadcasts for 32 years (starting in 1975); viewers had been setting their watches and clocks by RPN for many years, until that clock was abandoned at the end of 2007. After the fire that razed RPN's first studios on June 6, 1973, the network moved to the Broadcast Plaza (now ABS-CBN Broadcasting Center) that same year, and then to its current home in Broadcast City in July 1978, alongside sister networks Banahaw Broadcasting Corporation (BBC) and Intercontinental Broadcasting Corporation (IBC).

RPN also aired anime (Japanese animation) and syndicated programs from the United States. RPN was the first network to cover Philippine Basketball Association (PBA) games live in 1975 (and 1977), before these broadcasts moved to BBC in 1976.

On January 15, 1980, RPN began to broadcast primetime programs through its new domestic satellite technology (DOMSAT), in which the 1980s logo resembles a satellite antenna. On May 18, 1982, Eat Bulaga! was also included in the list of the network's programs simulcast via DOMSAT. As a result, RPN was the first national network to achieve nationwide program simulcasting via satellite in 24 television stations across the Philippines.

In addition, the network was the home of the Japanese Super Sentai series and tokusatsu programs from 1978 until the early 1980s. In 1981, the network adopted The Leader as its official slogan, coupled with its number 9, the red corporate logo (which is the network's current logo) and the theme composed by Domeng Amarillo. In 1986, after President Corazon Aquino assumed office, the government sequestered Radio Philippines Network for allegedly being part of crony capitalism under the Marcos regime. During the live broadcast of Marcos' inauguration from the Malacañang Palace during the final day of the People Power Revolution, rebels shut down the RPN transmitter on Panay Avenue; the network resumed broadcasts again on March 3, 1986.

==== First decline and sequestration (1986–1989) ====
After the People Power Revolution that ousted dictator Ferdinand Marcos and installed Corazon Aquino as president in February 1986, the stock and assets of RPN, IBC, and BBC were sequestered by the Presidential Commission on Good Government (PCGG). President Corazon Aquino awarded BBC's Channel 2 frequency and its affiliates, through an executive order, to ABS-CBN. RPN's and IBC's assets were turned over to the Government Communications Group and placed under the management of a board of administrators, who were tasked with operating and managing its business and affairs, subject to control and supervision by the PCGG.

RPN experienced a major decline during this period, as its resources became outdated and endured major mismanagement, which led the network to either shut down or sell its stations. From being number one in the ratings, RPN's ratings slumped because of the growth of GMA Radio-Television Arts and PTV—and more importantly, as a result of ABS-CBN's meteoric rise to the number one spot in 1988.

During the era after the People Power Revolution, RPN launched the first Filipino-created animated series, Ang Panday. By 1989, some of RPN's programming—such as John en Marsha and Superstar—was canceled; TAPE Inc.'s daytime programs Eat Bulaga!, Agila, and Coney Reyes on Camera (a coproduction with Coney Reyes' CAN Television) moved under a coproduction agreement to ABS-CBN, as it saw the resurgent network as a vital element in sustaining the three shows' success. By then, the once-dominant RPN had fallen to fourth place, trailing far behind ABS-CBN and GMA, and locked in a losing battle with PTV for third place.

=== New Vision 9 (1989–1994) ===
On October 8, 1989, RPN was renamed as New Vision 9 to recoup lost audience share in the ratings game of Philippine television networks. That same year, the network transmitter's effective radiated power was increased to 1 million watts, resulting in clearer and better signal reception in the Greater Luzon Area. The rebranding took place after RPN and Syndicated Media Access Corporation (SMAC) took over the network's management and marketing. The rebranding, although it proved futile for turning around RPN's ratings, did make history for the network, as it pioneered 24-hour television broadcasting in the Philippines. During the latter part of the New Vision 9 era, the network's ratings sank further, ranking last in primetime (behind ABS-CBN, GMA, ABC, IBC, and PTV). Worse yet, RPN's nationwide reach suffered along with its television network. In 1989, it consisted of 24 television stations nationwide (8 originating stations and 16 relay stations).

By that time, RPN needed to deal not only with the continued dominance of ABS-CBN and GMA, but also with the return of another station shut down during martial law—Associated Broadcasting Company (ABC)—and the onset of cable and ultrahigh frequency (UHF) channels. These channels began to absorb the audience share of the least-watched networks.

=== The second Radio Philippines Network (1994–2007) ===
==== Telenovela dominance, emphasis on world-class primetime programming (1994–2003) ====
In 1994, New Vision 9 was renamed back to Radio Philippines Network (RPN); that same year, RPN became the second very high frequency (VHF) television network in the Philippines to broadcast in full surround stereo (after GMA Network had introduced StereoVision in 1987). Following this, RPN managed to recover in the primetime ratings, from being last in 1994 to fifth in 1995; these ratings surpassed PTV's ratings. (By that time, PTV had suffered a major blow after losing the rights to one of its top-raters—the PBA games—to IBC.) RPN's primetime ratings, along with its third-place daytime ratings, helped the network to challenge ABC for third place in total day ratings.

In 1996, RPN quickly regained its foothold when it began to broadcast a Tagalog dub of the 1994 Mexican telenovela series Marimar; this turned out to be an extraordinary success, and it disconcerted the competition for some time.

The network became the driving force in Tagalog-dubbed foreign programs and movies, made them popular, and turned around its ratings for primetime programming. Because of RPN's success, other networks followed and broadcast telenovelas not only from Mexico, but also Spanish-language telenovelas from several countries:

- United States
- Colombia—GMA Network's Betty La Fea
- Venezuela—GMA Network's Samantha and All My Love
- Argentina—GMA Network's Monica Brava

These networks eventually also broadcast drama series from Brazil and several countries in Asia:

- Brazil—ABS-CBN's Ana Manuela
- Taiwan—notably Meteor Garden
- South Korea—notably Bright Girl
- Japan—notably Gokusen
- Indonesia—notably Pinokio and the Blue Fairy
- Thailand—notably You're My Destiny

In addition, RPN became the home of the best English-language television programs from around the world, with a strong primetime programming lineup.

This lineup helped RPN to maintain its overall fourth-place standing in the ratings during the latter half of the 1990s, despite facing later competition from UHF stations such as ABS-CBN's Studio 23, which offered more canned (prerecorded) programs compared to most VHF stations. In 1999, RPN slid again to fifth place behind ABC, but RPN managed to recover its fourth-place standing the following year, until early 2003.

==== Second decline (2003–2007) ====
During the mid-2000s, a major network war in the ratings game ensued, with a battle of Taiwanese/Korean-language television series—which started through ABS-CBN's broadcast of the Taiwanese series Meteor Garden—between the two leading networks, ABS-CBN and GMA; this caused RPN to decline in the telenovela battle.

On February 19, 2004, President Gloria Macapagal Arroyo signed Republic Act No. 9250, renewing RPN's congressional franchise for another 25 years. That same year, the network launched its primetime block, dubbed The Prime Shift, blocktimed by Solar Entertainment Corporation. The said programming block lasted until 2006—largely due to continued financial turmoil—and shrank from 24 television stations to 8 television stations by 2007.

=== Solar Entertainment era (2007–2014) ===
==== Blocktime with Solar, as C/S; C/S9; Solar TV (2007–2011) ====
C/S9 logo used from October 4, 2008 – November 28, 2009

On March 11, 2007, after its initial tie-up with The Prime Shift block, RPN announced its partnership with Solar Entertainment Corporation, an operator of a number of cable channels in the country. Solar began coproducing new programming for the network, such as a local version of the Top Model franchise. The network underwent management changes on December 24, 2007. Tonypet Albano, undersecretary and executive director of Malacañang's Office of Political Coalition Affairs and Deputy Spokesperson of TEAM Unity, now Vice-Governor of Isabela, was appointed chairman of the network. He replaced Education Undersecretary Mona Valisno, incumbent Presidential Assistant for Education. Undersecretary Robert Rivera was appointed director of the board, while the new president and chief executive officer was former senator Orlando "Orly" Mercado.

Mercado's first major action was to expand the network's partnerships with Solar Entertainment. Programming from Solar's cable network C/S was added to RPN's lineup at the beginning of the new year; in addition, PBA basketball returned to the network starting in the 2008–09 season. This was part of Solar Sports' new three-year deal with the league, after ABC's contract expired because of the network's rebranding as TV5, because of the blocktime agreement with Malaysian-based Media Prima Berhad subsidiary MPB Primedia, Inc. and an intense bidding war with ABS-CBN.

In October 2008, RPN's stations ultimately took on the C/S name as part of their permanent branding, and RPN rebranded itself as C/S 9. On November 29, 2009, the network rebranded itself again under the new name Solar TV. In late 2010, it emerged that RPN would no longer carry PBA games, due to a planned network relaunch scheduled for 2011, with more "feminine" programming.

==== Privatization; as ETC (2011–2013) ====
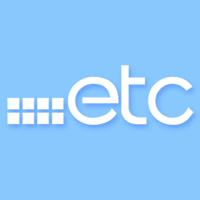
ETC logo from March 2, 2011 – November 30, 2013

In 2010, the Philippine government began to actively consider privatizing RPN and IBC. Ricardo Abcede, a member of the PCGG, supported the plans, noting that the government should not need to subsidize three state broadcasters when most countries have only one, and it could earn a significant profit if these stations were sold to a major company willing to invest in them.

In January 2011, reports confirmed that Solar Entertainment Corporation (through Solar TV Network) and Roberto Benedicto's daughter Kitchie Benedicto together owned a 34% minority share in RPN. In addition, Presidential Communications Operations Office (PCOO) secretary Herminio Coloma Jr. began to meet with the network's employees' union, in order to discuss the financial state of RPN as part of the planned privatization. On February 22, 2011, RPN's employees filed a strike notice, protesting a rumored shutdown of RPN on February 25 and accusing the government of attempting to privatize RPN without actively consulting its employees.

On February 25, 2011, RPN temporarily signed off in preparation for a relaunch as ETC on March 2, 2011. Additional shares in RPN were sold to Far East Managers and Investors Inc. (FEMI), a company affiliated with Ambassador Roberto Benedicto. The government retained People's Television Network to serve as the only state broadcaster in the country. However, after privatization, RPN retrenched 200 employees and stopped the production of RPN NewsWatch—its last RPN-produced program—on October 29, 2012; this happened as RPN started outsourcing news programs from Solar TV's news department, when Solar took over the entire network's airtime.

==== As Solar News Channel (2013–2014) ====
In November 2013, reports emerged that San Miguel Corporation's President and Chief Operating Officer, Ramon S. Ang, was interested in acquiring Solar Television Network.

On November 30, 2013, ETC returned to SBN, while Solar News Channel moved to RPN the following day to widen its nationwide telecast. (SBN broadcast ETC from 2008 to 2011.)

=== Nine Media era (2014–present) ===
==== As 9TV (2014–2015) ====
9TV logo from August 23, 2014 – March 15, 2015

On January 3, 2014, RPN and ABC signed a memorandum of agreement for expanded coverage of both the television and radio networks nationwide. Selected DWIZ programs would be simulcast on the Radyo Ronda Network.

On August 20, 2014, Solar Entertainment Corporation's CEO, Wilson Tieng, announced that he ceded his entire share in Solar TV Network, Inc.—including its 34% majority share in RPN—to Antonio Cabangon Chua, owner of business daily BusinessMirror and Aliw Broadcasting Corporation. Tieng sold Solar TV because they were losing money on operations, and the group shifted to focus on Solar Entertainment's remaining free-to-air and cable channels; these included RPN's former affiliate ETC, 2nd Avenue (aired on RJTV until 2018), and Jack City (aired on BEAM TV until September 2014).

On August 13, 2014, to reflect the change of ownership, Solar Television Network and RPN announced the rebranding of Solar News Channel as 9TV by August 23, dropping the Solar branding. 9TV retained the news and current affairs programming, while expanding its weekend programming to cater to more audiences by launching Kids Weekend, Small Acts, Big Stories, Something to Chew On, and Boys Ride Out.

However, the 9TV branding had been done to transition ownership from Tieng to Cabangon Chua. On October 14, 2014, Nine Media Corporation (formerly Solar Television Network) inked a 5-year brand licensing agreement with the Turner Broadcasting System to rebrand 9TV into CNN Philippines as the Philippine franchisee of CNN, becoming the third local CNN channel in Asia (after CNN Indonesia and India's CNN-IBN). CNN Philippines was officially launched on March 16, 2015.

==== As CNN Philippines (2015–2024) ====
CNN Philippines logo from March 16, 2015 – January 31, 2024

On March 16, 2015, 9TV started broadcasting under the CNN Philippines brand. CNN Philippines is the seventh rebranding of Radio Philippines Network since its inception as Kanlaon Broadcasting System. The network dropped the transitional brand 9TV after seven months of operations under such brand. The new brand reflects the CNN format for news reporting with content from the Philippines.

In 2017, RPN and Nine Media Corporation acquired their UHF transmitter complex in Crestview Heights Subdivision, Brgy. San Roque, Antipolo, Rizal, from Progressive Broadcasting Corporation, in order to use RPN's digital terrestrial television broadcast in Metro Manila and nearby provinces.

On December 22, 2023, TV5 Network entered into an acquisition agreement with RPN's parent company, Nine Media Corporation, to broadcast the longest-running and number one noontime variety show, Eat Bulaga!, as well as selected games from the PBA, every Saturday and Sunday on CNN Philippines starting January 6, 2024. This marked the return of two programs previously aired on RPN to strengthen CNN Philippines' weekend lineup.

However, on January 25, 2024, Media Newser Philippines reported that Nine Media Corporation and CNN decided to shut down CNN Philippines by mutual agreement; the causes were financial losses, poor network ratings, and a loss of advertiser support. While CNN was still weighing its future options, RPN was playing a looping logo plug for its newly branded station, RPTV, after CNN Philippines officially closed its operations around 10 pm.

On January 29, 2024, CNN Philippines announced that its live news productions would cease with immediate effect, and it would be dissolved entirely at the end of the month; CNN Philippines cited financial losses and a shift in focus to operating its sister channel, Aliw Channel 23.

==== Partnership with TV5 Network; as RPTV (2024–present) ====
RPTV logo since February 1, 2024

On January 31, 2024, Bilyonaryo.com reported that TV5 Network partnered with Nine Media and RPN to carry selected sports, news, and entertainment programming. This included Eat Bulaga!, PBA games, and other sporting events from One Sports, alongside programs originally produced by Nine Media under its channel's new branding RPTV, which launched the following day. Selected programs from One PH and 105.9 True FM also aired on RPTV, marking its return to analog free-to-air television after five years since AksyonTV's closure. On February 6, 2024, the partnership was formalized after MediaQuest Holdings, TV5, and Nine Media signed an agreement for content distribution, sales, and marketing services for the new channel. RPN retains license and transmission operations for the network because ownership restrictions limit the number of stations a franchise holder can own in a specific media market.

== Programming ==
=== RPTV programs ===
RPTV programming consists of simulcasts and reruns of programs originally from TV5 and its sister channels. These include Eat Bulaga! and PBA games that were first aired simultaneously on CNN Philippines (before its closure on January 31, 2024), as well as Ted Failon at DJ Chacha sa True FM and Wanted sa Radyo.

== See also ==
- Nine Media News and Current Affairs
- TV5 Network
- RPTV
