= Nine Media Corporation =

Philippine media company

- Formerly: Solar Television Network, Inc. (2010–2014)
- Type: Private
- Industry: Mass media Broadcasting; Entertainment
- Founded: January 5, 2010; 16 years ago
- Founder: Wilson Y. Tieng; Willy Y. Tieng; William Y. Tieng
- Headquarters: JMT Building Condominium, 27 ADB Avenue, Ortigas Center, Pasig, Metro Manila, Philippines
- Area served: Nationwide
- Key people: Benjamin Ramos (President)
- Products: Television program Web portal Digital media
- Brands: RPTV; Formerly: CNN Philippines; 9TV; Solar News Channel; Talk TV; ETC (now SolarFlix); CHASE; Jack City; Solar TV; C/S 9; 2nd Avenue
- Services: Broadcasting; TV production Cable television Internet; Streaming service Broadcast syndication Satellite television
- Revenue: PHP169.6 million (FY 2015)
- Operating income: PHP-651.85 million (FY 2015)
- Owner: JRLT-JHI Corporation
- Number of employees: 328 (FY 2015)
- Parent: Broadreach Media Holdings, Inc. (ALC Group of Companies)
- Divisions: Nine Media News and Current Affairs (2011—2024)
- Subsidiaries: Radio Philippines Network (34%)

Nine Media Corporation (NMC) (Note: Formerly known as Solar Television Network, Inc. or STVNI) is a Philippine media and content company based in Pasig, Philippines. Formerly a wholly owned subsidiary of Solar Entertainment Corporation (SEC), a multimedia television and film company owned by Tieng family, it is now solely owned by the ALC Group of Companies through its indirect parent Broadreach Media Holdings, Inc.

Established in 2010 as a former corporate television arm of Solar Entertainment and served as a content provider for Solar-affiliated networks (RPN, SBN, RJTV, and BEAM TV). The company is also the majority shareholder of state-sequestered Radio Philippines Network (RPN), which privatized it's 34% controlling share from the Philippine Government as a part of 2011 RPN/IBC privatization. Later in 2014, SEC sold the entire share of the company to the ALC Group of Companies due to revenue losses while investing the network.

Today, Nine Media currently serves as a blocktimer for RPN's television stations, which airs its free-to-air channel RPTV through a joint venture with TV5 Network.

== History ==
=== TV channel ===
Solar Entertainment launched Solar TV in the early 2000s, which was later renamed to Solar USA and then to USA. In 2005, USA was split into two channels, Jack TV and Crime/Suspense.

Solar TV was relaunched on November 29, 2009, on Radio Philippines Network (RPN), then owned by the Philippine Government Communications Group (since 2007, Solar TV had already entered into an airtime lease agreement with RPN). Its programming grid primarily included American programs, local sports, and lifestyle content. On October 31, 2010, it changed some of its programming content to English and Tagalog.

=== Broadcast company ===
Former Logo of Solar TV as a television network

Solar TV ventured as Solar Television Network, Inc. (STVNI) on January 5, 2010, becoming the Solar Entertainment's corporate television arm. The new company launched an all talk and news channel, Talk TV, on March 2, 2011, co-owned by Solar TV and Southern Broadcasting Network. (Talk TV would later change its name to Solar News Channel on October 30, 2012.) At the end of 2011, Solar TV launched its own news division called Solar News. The programs produced by the new division were staffed by former ANC personalities such as Jing Magsaysay, Pia Hontiveros, Nancy Irlanda, Claire Celdran and Mai Rodriguez.

STVNI later represented Solar Entertainment's acquisition to Radio Philippines Network (34% privatized) from the Philippine Government as a part of RPN/IBC privatization in 2011.

In November 2013, President and COO of San Miguel Corporation, Ramon Ang, attempted to acquire the majority stake of STVNI from the Tieng family, who controlled the company. He settled for a minority share of STVNI in September 2014.

In the third quarter of 2014, Solar Entertainment chair Wilson Tieng announced that the ALC Group of Companies, owned by late former Ambassador Antonio Cabangon-Chua, had acquired STVNI and its 34% majority stake on RPN. The sale of STVNI was caused by Solar Entertainment's revenue losses after its investment in RPN. After the sale, Wilson Tieng and Robert Rivera resigned from their respective positions as chairman and president of RPN. Solar TV reflected the change in ownership by removing the Solar branding from all Solar News Channel programs; SNC was rebranded as 9TV on August 23, 2014.

On October 14, 2014, Solar TV Network was renamed as Nine Media Corporation, following the brand licensing agreement between the latter and the Turner Broadcasting System to use the CNN brand for RPN's free TV assets and 9TV rebranded as CNN Philippines, which was considered as a transitional brand. It was launched on March 16, 2015.

In September 2015, Nine Media President and CEO Reggie Galura stepped down from his position and was replaced by Jorge San Agustin as Officer-in-Charge of the network. On October 9, 2016, CNN Philippines Managing Editor Armie Jarin-Bennett was appointed as president and CEO of Nine Media, replacing San Agustin.

On January 25, 2024, Nine Media and CNN mutually agreed to shut down CNN Philippines due to financial losses, poor ratings, and loss of advertiser support. Four days later, CNN Philippines confirmed that it had ceased live news production and was to be dissolved on January 31, citing financial losses. Broadreach Media Holdings Inc. took over the assets and properties of CNN Philippines following its closure. Broadreach later launched digital news media service NewsWatch Plus, which was independently managed by the remaining staff of CNN Philippines.

On January 31, 2024, TV5 Network formed a partnership with Nine Media and RPN to carry selected programming (including Eat Bulaga!, Philippine Basketball Association games and other sporting events from One Sports) under the channel's new branding, RPTV, which was launched the following day. Selected programs from One PH and True FM also began airing on RPTV, marking its return to analog free-to-air television after five years since AksyonTV's closure. On February 6, 2024, Nine Media, TV5 and its parent company MediaQuest Holdings formalized their partnership for the new channel.

== Corporate structure ==
=== As Solar TV Network ===
Prior to ALC Group of Companies' acquisition in 2014, Solar Entertainment Corporation (SEC) and Solar TV (STV) operated as two separate business entities:

- SEC was exclusively owned by the Tieng brothers and operates ten (10) TV networks, namely: ETC, 2nd Avenue, JackTV, JackCITY, Solar Sports, Basketball TV, NBA Premium, Shop TV, The Game Channel, and My Movie Channel. It was also involved in film distribution.
- STV, which operated Solar News Channel, was a corporation in which both William Tieng and Wilson Tieng were members of the board of directors.

=== As Nine Media ===
Since 2014, Nine Media Corporation has been owned by ALC Group of Companies through its investment unit, JRLT-JHI Corporation, by way of an intermediary holding company, Broadreach Media Holdings. JRLT-JHI was owned by former Ambassador Antonio Cabangon-Chua which serves as chairman of the company from 2014 until his death in 2016; since then, his family members Ferdinand Chua, Rowena Lumague, Candy Co, Jose Wingkee Jr., and Aida Anora owns 20% equal shares of the company.

While Businessman Ramon Ang reportedly owns a minority share in Nine Media, SEC documents does not show any shares registered under his name. Instead, Ang makes investments through advertisements and paid programming from the San Miguel Group to Nine Media's sole property, CNN Philippines.

== Broadcast assets ==
=== Subsidiaries ===
- Radio Philippines Network (RPN) - (34% share)

=== TV channels ===
- RPTV (joint venture with RPN/Nine Media and TV5 Network, Inc.)

=== Former subsidiaries, divisions and broadcast assets ===
==== Affiliate networks and blocktimers ====
- Broadcast Enterprises and Affiliated Media (August 15, 2011 – August 22, 2014)
- Rajah Broadcasting Network (January 1, 2008 –August 22, 2014)
- Southern Broadcasting Network (January 1, 2008 – August 22, 2014)

==== TV channels (operations reverted back to SEC) ====
- 2nd Avenue - (RJTV 29: January 1, 2008 – June 5, 2018; operations reverted to Solar Entertainment until its closure in 2018)
- ETC (now SolarFlix) - (SBN 21: January 1, 2008 – March 1, 2011; December 1, 2013 – July 10, 2022 / RPN 9: March 2, 2011 – November 30, 2013; operations reverted to Solar Entertainment)

==== Divisions ====
- ETC Productions (ownership reverted to Solar Entertainment until 2022)
- Nine Media News and Current Affairs - (March 2, 2011 – January 31, 2024; most of operations and assets sold to and merged with MediaQuest Holdings' TV5 news division News5, remaining spun out into NewsWatch Plus)

=== Previous or changed ownership television channels ===
- CHASE - (BEAM TV 31: December 24, 2011 – October 19, 2012)
- C/S 9 - (RPN 9: January 1, 2008 – November 28, 2009)
- CNN Philippines - (joint venture with RPN and Warner Bros. Discovery) (RPN 9: March 16, 2015 – January 31, 2024)
- Jack City - (BEAM TV 31: October 20, 2012 – August 31, 2014 / Cable TV only: September 1, 2014 – March 21, 2015)
- Solar News Channel - (SBN 21): October 30, 2012 – November 30, 2013 / (RPN 9: / December 1, 2013 – August 22, 2014)
- 9TV - (RPN 9: August 23, 2014 – March 15, 2015)
- Solar TV - (RPN 9: November 29, 2009 – March 1, 2011)
- Talk TV - (SBN 21: March 2, 2011 – October 29, 2012)

== RPN Stations ==
Since Nine Media doesn't need a congressional franchise to operate, the company controls 7 RPN stations nationwide. The company also serves as the content provider for RPN's affiliate RPTV together with TV5 Network.

== See also ==
- Radio Philippines Network
- TV5 Network
- List of privatizations by country
