= 9TV =

Defunct commercial television network in the Philippines

- Type: Broadcast commercial television network
- Country: Philippines
- Availability: Defunct
- Founded: August 23, 2014
- Broadcast area: Nationwide
- Owner: Nine Media Corporation
- Key people: Amb. Antonio L.C. Chua (Chairman, Radio Philippines Network); Jing Magsaysay (Senior Vice President); Pal Marquez (Vice President for News and Current Affairs); Robert T. Rivera (President & CEO, Radio Philippines Network)
- Launch date: August 23, 2014; 12 years ago
- Dissolved: March 15, 2015; 11 years ago
- Analogue channel: 9 (VHF)
- Picture format: NTSC 480i (SDTV)
- Affiliation: Radio Philippines Network (34%)
- Official website: 9news.ph (redirected to CNNPhilippines.com until June 2015)
- Language: English (main); Filipino, Cebuano, Kapampangan (secondary)
- Replaced: Solar News Channel
- Replaced by: CNN Philippines

9TV was a Philippine free-to-air television network. Owned and operated by Nine Media Corporation (formerly Solar Television Network), which serves as the main content provider of Radio Philippines Network (RPN). It was the successor channel of the now-defunct Solar News Channel. It broadcast 18 hours daily from 6:00 AM to 12:00 MN on free TV, as well as 24 hours a day on cable and satellite TV providers, and through live streaming.

Its flagship television station was DZKB-TV channel 9 in Mega Manila and other regional originating and relay stations in the Philippines.

Most of the live programming of the network is from the main studios located at Upper Ground Floor of the Worldwide Corporate Center, Shaw Boulevard corner Epifanio de los Santos Avenue in Mandaluyong with transmitter at No. 97, Panay Avenue, Brgy. South Triangle, Quezon City.

The channel ceased broadcasting on March 15, 2015, and was replaced by CNN Philippines on March 16, 2015.

== History ==
9TV was launched on August 23, 2014, at 12:00 MN, as a replacement for Solar News Channel. Its first show as 9TV was a replay of Nightly News. Solar News, the network's news arm was rebranded as 9News. The rebranding of the network came after Antonio Cabangon Chua's acquisition of Tieng's share of both STVNI (now known as Nine Media Corporation) and RPN to ALC Group of Companies due to the Tieng's loss of revenue after investing in RPN.

The newscasts, current affairs programs, and public service programs carried from the SNC format and the personnel were retained. It also beefed up their weekend programming including cartoons, infotainment programs, reality, and infomercials to cater more viewers.

The rebranding stage took almost seven months until 9TV was rebranded into CNN Philippines that launched on March 16, 2015. 9News inked a partnership deal with international news network CNN.

As part of the transition to CNN Philippines, 9TV temporarily used green screen as their news studio while their main newsroom and studio is under renovation in December 2014 and 9TV newscasts and current affairs programs began adopting CNN-themed graphics a week later (January 15, 2015). Some non-CNN programming (NBC and CBS shows), as well as the Home Shopping Network (now Shop TV) and Kids Weekend (now defunct CNN Philippines Junior) block were axed in the coming months.
