= List of programs previously broadcast by Radio Philippines Network =

Programs previously aired by the Radio Philippines Network and RPTV broadcasts a variety of programming through its VHF terrestrial television station RPN TV-9 Manila. This article also includes shows previously aired by RPN as itself, and other previous incarnations.

== Local defunct shows ==
=== Game shows ===
- Battle of the Brains (1992–2000)
- Blackout (1988)
- Family Kuarta o Kahon (1984–2000)
- Geym Na Geym (1981–1982)
- It's a Date (1993–1994)
- Kol TV¹ (2007–2008)
- Match TV (2002–2003)
- Spin-A-Win (1975–1985)
- Star Date
- Super Suerte sa 9 (1987)

=== Informative ===
- Business Class (1991–2000)
- Business Expedition
- ETC Vibe (2011–2013) (Note: With ETC television network)
- ETC Watchlist (2011–2013)
- Para Po (2005)
- Small Acts, Big Stories
- Superbrands (2005–2006)
- The Scene (2001)
- The Shahani Perspective (1993–1994)
- TWBF (This Week's Big Five) (2009)
- Two Stops Over

=== Morning shows ===
- Daybreak (2013–2015)
- Good Morning Misis! (1996–1997)
- Magandang Morning Philippines! (2003–2004)
- One Morning Cafe (2007–2010)
- Wake Up Call (1995–1998)

=== Music videos and movie trailer line-up ===
- Box Office Hit Parade
- Cinema Cinema (1993–1997)
- Cinema Cinema Cinema (1997–1999)
- I-Music (2007)
- Mega Cinema Review (1989–1994)
- Movie Line-Up
- Movieparade (1991–1995)
- The American Chart Show (1985–1989)
- The Fuse
- The Top 10 Movie Trailers of the Week
- Video Hit Parade
- Video Hot Tracks

=== Reality ===
- Ang Bagong Kampeon (1985–1988)
- Barkada sa 9
- Clear Men Future League (2009)
- Gen M
- House of Hoops (2009–2010)
- I Am Meg (2012–2013)
- IKON Philippines (2007)
- It's a Date (1991–1995)
- Match TV (2002–2003)
- Mega Fashion Crew (2011–2013)
- Mega Young Designers Competition (2012–2013)
- One Night with an Angel (2007)
- Pasikatan sa 9 (1993–1995)
- Philippines' Next Top Model (2007)
- Project Runway Philippines (2012)
- Shoot That Babe (2007–2008)
- Single Girls (2007)
- Something to Chew on with Xandra Rocha
- Star Search sa 9 (1996–1997)
- The So-called Life of Ryan Garcia Is Going Public (2007)
- Warriors: Celebrity Boxing Challenge (2009)
- What I See with Paco Guerrero (2013–2015)

=== Newscasts ===
- Arangkada Chavacano (2000–2006)
- Arangkada sa Nueve Davao (2001)
- Arangkada Ulat sa Tanghali (1999–2000)
- Cebuano News (2013–2017)
- CNN Philippines Headline News (2015–2016)
- CNN Philippines Network News (2012–2017)
- CNN Philippines Nightly News (2012–2016)
- Daybreak (2013–2015)
- Eyewitness Reports (1969–1970)
- Global Conversations (2015–2016)
- Kapampangan News (2014–2017)
- KBS Spot Check (1969–1973)
- Mga Balita ni Efren Montes (1972–1973)
- Newsday (2013–2015)
- NewsWatch (1970–2012)
  - RPN iWatch News (2007–2008)
  - RPN NewsCap (2009–2012)
  - RPN NewsWatch Aksyon Balita (2006–2008)
  - NewsWatch Balita Ngayon
  - NewsWatch sa Umaga
  - NewsWatch sa Tanghali
  - NewsWatch Evening Edition
  - NewsWatch Final Edition
  - NewsWatch Evening Cast
  - NewsWatch Prime Cast
  - NewsWatch Pilipino Edition (1981–1985)
  - NewsWatch Second Edition (2008–2009)
  - NewsWatch Now (2001–2007)
  - NewsWatch International (1977–1990)
- Primetime Balita (2000–2001)
- RPN Arangkada Balita (2004–2006)
- RPN Arangkada Xtra Balita (2000–2004)
- RPN Newsbreak (1982–1989, 1994–2003)
- RPN News Update (2003–2008)
- RPN NewsWatch Update (2008–2011)
- The Headlines (2013–2015)
- The Hour Updates (1989–1994)
- The Saturday Report
- The Sunday Report
- This Week Tonight (1977–1989)

=== Drama ===
- Agila (produced by TAPE Inc., 1987–1989)
- Agos (1987–1988)
- Ako... Babae (1994)
- Ang Makulay Na Daigdig ni Nora (1974–1979)
- Ang Pangarap Kong Jackpot (produced by PCSO, 1995–2007)
- Anna Luna, Ikalawang Aklat (1994–1995)
- Bakit Ba Ganyan? (2002–2004)
- Bedtime Stories
- Bisperas ng Kasaysayan (1994–1995)
- Boracay (1990)
- Cebu I, Cebu II (1991–1992)
- Charo (1988)
- Coney Reyes - Mumar on the Set (1981–1984, produced by CAN Television)
- Coney Reyes on Camera (1984–1989, produced by TAPE, Inc.)
- Correctionals (1989–1990)
- Davao: Ang Gintong Pag-Asa (1992)
- Dayuhan
- De Buena Familia (1992–1993)
- Dear Manilyn (1988–1991)
- Flordeluna (1979–1984, 1987–1988)
- Gapo (1994)
- Gulong ng Buhay (1981–1983)
- Gulong ng Palad (1979–1981)
- Hanggang Kailan, Anna Luna?: Ikalawang Aklat (1994–1995)
- Heredero (produced by TAPE Inc., 1984–1987)
- Hilda Drama Specials (1989)
- Kapag Nasa Katwiran... Ipaglaban Mo! (1999–2000)
- La Aunor (1984)
- Lumayo Ka Man (1993–1996)
- Makulay ang Daigdig ni Nora (1976–1978)
- Malayo Pa ang Umaga (1993–1995)
- May Bukas Pa (produced by Viva Television, 2000–2001)
- May Puso ang Batas (2003–2004)
- Miranova (1994–1995)
- Mukha ng Buhay (produced by Viva Television, 1996)
- Pamilya
- Paglipas ng Panahon (1983–1985)
- Paraiso (produced by D'JEM Productions)
- Seiko TV Presents (1988–1989)
- Simply Snooky (1986–1988)
- Talambuhay (1981–1985)
- Tanglaw ng Buhay (1990–1994)
- Teenage Diary (1986–1988)
- Tierra Sangre (produced by Viva Television, 1996)
- Verdadero (1986–1988)
- Young Love, Sweet Love (1987–1993)

==== Action ====
- Ang Panday (1986–1988)
- Krusada Kontra Krimen (2005–2007)

==== Fantasy and horror ====
- Captain Barbell (1987–1988)
- Chinese Movies
- Darna (1977)
- Julian Talisman (1983–1984)
- Lily Tubig (1991)
- Mga Kakaibang Horror Stories, Totoo Kaya?
- Mga Kakaibang Kuwento, Totoo Kaya?
- Nora Cinderella (1984–1985)
- Ora Engkantada (1996–1998)
- Wari Waro (1988–1991)
- Zarda (1974–1976)

=== Variety ===
- Aawitan Kita (1977–1997)
- Aksyon, Komedya, Drama ATBP. (1993–1998)
- Ayan Eh! (1970)
- Barkada sa 9 (1977–1980)
- Big Ike's Happening (1975–1983)
- Biz Show Na 'To! (2007)
- Broadcast Campus (1973–1979)
- Carmen in Color (1971–1977)
- Chibugan Na! (1994–1996)
- Dance 10 (1982–1983, produced by Our Own Little Way Productions)
- Fantastik Jeanne in Motion (1970–1976)
- Kami Naman! (1990)
- Kumpletos Recados (1976–1978)
- Let's Dance with Becky Garcia (1996–1998)
- Lotlot & Friends (1985–1988)
- Lucky Stars (1980)
- Manilyn Live! (1990–1991)
- Maricel Live! (1986–1988)
- Movieparade (1991–1995)
- On D'Spot (2004–2006)
- Pipwede (1977–1980)
- Rhapsody (1990)
- Sabado Boys (2007)
- Santos, Mortiz & Associates (1973–1974)
- Student Canteen (1989–1990)
- Superstar (1975–1989)
- Superstar: Beyond Time (1994–1995)
- Talk of the Town
- The Eddie-Nora Show (1970–1972)
- The Imelda Papin Show (2003–2004)
- The New Oh Rosemarie (1971)
- The Nida-Lita Show (1973–1977)
- Tony Santos Presents (1973–1977)
- Your Evening with Pilita (1994–1995)

=== Comedy ===
- Ang Manok ni San Pedro (1987)
- Apple Pie, Patis, Atbp. (1987–1989)
- ATM: Anette, Tonyboy & Maria (1993–1994)
- Ayos Lang, Pare Ko (1977)
- Barangay U.S.: Unang Sigaw (1994–1995)
- Basta Barkada (1978)
- Bogart Case Files¹ (2014–2016)
- Buddy en Sol (1990–1995)
- Cafeteria Aroma (1979)
- Champoy (1980–1985)
- Clubhouse 9 (1977–1978)
- Co-Ed Blues (1987–1988)
- Dalawang Tisoy (2007)
- Dobol Trobol (1989)
- D'on Po sa Amin (1994)
- Dr. Potpot and the Satellite Kid (1985)
- Duplex (1980–1984)
- Gabi ni Dolphy (1990)
- Ganito Kami Ngayon, O Ano Ha (1994)
- Hoy! (1990–1991)
- In DA Money (2005)
- Iyan ang Misis Ko (1970–1972)
- Joey and Son (1980–1983)
- John En Marsha (1973–1990)
- Just the 3 of Us (1992–1993)
- Kaluskos-Musmos (1984–1989)
- Kami Naman! (1990)
- Kapiterya Pinoy (2001–2002)
- Ke-Mis: Kay Misis Umaasa (2007)
- Mag-Asawa'y Di Biro (1990–1993)
- Mommy Ko si Tita (1993–1994)
- Mongolian Barbecue sa 9 (1992–1994)
- My Son, My Son (1977)
- No Permanent Address (1986)
- Padre de Familia (1972)
- Pinky and Boyet
- Plaza 1899 (1986–1988)
- Purungtong (1991–1993)
- Ready Na Direk! (1991–1993)
- Sa Kabukiran (1986)
- Sabi ni Nanay (2007)
- Starzan (1990–1991)
- Stir (1988)
- Tambakan Alley (1981–1983)
- The Front Act Show (2010–2011)
- Tipitipitim Tipitom (2005)
- Tokshow with Mr. Shooli (1999–2000)
- T.S.U.P (1990)
- What's Up 'day! (2003)

=== Current affairs ===
- Action 9 (1993–1998)
- Agenda (2015–2016)
- Back to Back (1996)
- Balikatan
- Banyuhay (1988–1989)
- Blotter (1989–1990)
- Buhay Pinoy (2004–2007)
- Business Class (1991–2001)
- Compañero y Compañera (2000–2001)
- Cerge for Truth (2003–2007)
- Daybreak (2013–2015)
- Dee's Day (2003–2007)
- Direct Line (2003–2006)
- Diyos at Bayan (2002–2005)
- Exclusively Hers
- First Lady ng Masa
- For M (2006–2007)
- FVR Up Close (1992–1998)
- Global Conversations (2015–2016)
- Headlines Exposed (2004–2005)
- Helpline sa 9 (1981–1983)
- Hirit Kabayan
- Ikaw at ang Batas (2000–2007)
- Insight Inside (2004–2007)
- Isyung Pinoy (previously Isip Pinoy; 1987–1991)
- Isumbong Mo! (Tulfo Brothers) (2006)
- Isumbong Mo Kay Tulfo (1996–2006)
- Isyu (1981–1985)
- Kakampi (2000–2001)
- Kapatid (2005–2006)
- Kapihan ng Bayan (2005–2007)
- Kasangga Mo ang Langit (2000–2007)
- Kaya Natin 'To!
- Legal Forum (1992–2006)
- Legal Help Desk (2013–2016)
- Madam Ratsa Live! (2003–2004)
- Makabayang Duktor (2005–2007)
- Make My Day with Larry Henares
- Malacañang Press Conference
- Mare, Mag-Usap Tayo
- News Café (2013–2015)
- News.PH (2013–2017)
- Newslight (1994–2001)
- Ngayon Na, Pinoy!
- Dial OCR (1973–1980)
- Opposing Views (2013–2015)
- Our Doctors (1970)
- One Morning Cafe (2007–2010)
- Political Insider (2016–2017)
- Prangkahan (2003–2005)
- Public Access Programs
- Pulsong Pinoy (2011–2012)
- Ratsada Balita (2000–2006)
- RPN Forum (2003–2005)
- RPN NewsWatch Junior Edition (2008–2009)
- Sa Bayan... (2000–2001)
- Sama-Sama, Kayang-Kaya!
- Serbisyo All Access (2014–2017)
- Stop Watch (1986–1994)
- Street Pulse (1986)
- Tapatan with Jay Sonza (2000–2001)
- Teka! Teka! Teka!
- Tell the People (1983–1997)
- The Doctor Is In (1994, 2001–2004)
- The Estrada Presidency (1998–2001)
- The Executive Report
- The Imelda Papin Show (2003–2004)
- The Police Hour (1992–2007)
- The Service Road (2016–2017)
- TimesFour
- To Saudi with Love (2000)
- OPS-PIA: Ugnayan sa Hotel Rembrandt (1992–2001)
- Ugnayang Pambansa (2003–2005)
- Wats UP sa Barangay (1993–1994)
- The Working President (2001–2010)
- World Class

=== Children's ===
- Batibot (1984–1991)
- Eskwela ng Bayan (2003)
  - Alikabuk
  - Karen's World
  - Solved
  - Why?
- For Kids Only (2000–2002)
- Jr. News (2004–2005)
- Kids to Go (1999–2000)
- Kids TV (2004–2006)
- Kids World
- NewsWatch Kids Edition (1979–1993)
- Pedya: TV Day Care (1990)
- Penpen De Sarapen (1987–2001)
- Star Smile Factory (1993–1996)
- Storyland (2002–2005)
- Uncle Bob's Children's Show (1997–2000)
- The Whimpols (1992–1995)
- Yan Ang Bata (1995–2000; re-runs, 2002–2005)

=== Educational ===
- Ajinomoto Cooking Show (1995-1997)
- Basta Barkada (1989–1995)
- Beauty School with Ricky Reyes (1990–1994)
- Beauty School Plus (1994–2005)
- Better Home Ideas (1996–2001)
- Bogart Case Files (2014–2016)
- Comida con Amor
- Cooking.Com (2001–2003)
- Cooking It Up with Nora Daza (1985–1987)
- Cooking with the Stars (1995)
- DOG TV (2010–2011)
- Fora Medica
- Gandang Ricky Reyes (2005–2006)
- Go Negosyo (2006–2007)
- Go Negosyo Big Time (2007)
- House of Beauty (1991)
- How 'Bout My Place (1999–2004)
- Kalusugan TV (2006–2007)
- KPlus! (2005)
- Kusina Atbp. (1995–1999)
- Luks Family (2002–2003)
- Lutong Bahay (1985–1989)
- Mag-Negosyo Tayo! (2005–2007)
- Make-Over (2006–2007)
- Mommy Hacks (2015)
- Novartis Payo ni Doc (2002–2004)
- Parenting 101 (2007)
- Something to Chew On (2013–2015, 2016–2017)
- Staying Alive (1979–1980)
- Teka Teka Teka
- Tipong Pinoy (1999–2000)
- Veggie, Meaty & Me (1992–1996)
- What's Up 'day! (2003)

=== Film and special presentation ===
- Afternoon Movie
- Afternoon Shockers
- Big Hit Movies
- Cinehouse 9
- C/S Blockbusters (2008–2009)
- C/S Movie Mania (2009)
- Chinese Movies
- Daily Matinee (1980)
- Dalisay Theater
- Dolphy Movies
- English Movies
- ETC Flix (2011–2013)
- French Movies
- Friday Movies in Private
- Friday Night Picturehouse
- Gintuang Ala-Ala
- Last Full Show (2007)
- Magsine Tayo!
- Midnight Movies
- Midweek Specials
- Monday's Television Marvels
- Morning Theater
- Movie Matinee
- Movie Monday
- Movie Treat
- Movies You Missed on Primetime
- Pamana Espesyal
- Pilipino Klasiks
- Rated Wide Awake Movies
- Relax (Watch a Movie)
- RVQ Movie Specials
- Sampaguita Pictures (1990)
- Saturday Night Playhouse
- Sinag 9
- Sinag sa 9
- Sine sa 9
- Sinebisyon
- Solar's Big Ticket (2010–2011)
- Solar's Golden Ticket (2009–2010)
- Studio 9 Presents
- Sunday's Big Event
- Super Tagalog Movies
- Tagalog Movie Special
- Teatro Pilipino
- TGOF: TV Greats on Friday
- The Marcos Diaries: A Public View of Private Lives (1989)
- Thursday Night Specials
- Thursday Suspense Theater
- True Confessions ng mga Bituin
- Tuesday Night Treat
- Wednesday Specials
- Weekend Specials
- World Premiere Presents

=== Infomercial ===
- Contact Magazine
- EZ Shop (2004–2007)
- Give a Life Informercial
- Global Window
- Home Shopping Network/Shop TV (2003–2014)
- Japan Video Topics
- The Quantum Channel (1996–2005)
- Prime K: Primera Klase
- Tagamends
- TV Window Shop
- USIS Filler Film
- Value Vision (1998–2007)
- Winner TV Shopping (2005–2007)

=== Religious ===
- Ang Dating Daan (1992–1998)
- Ang Iglesia ni Cristo (1983–1990)
- Asin at Ilaw (2000–2007)
- Cathedral of Praise with David Sumrall (2003–2005)
- Church of God (1983–1985)
- Diyos at Bayan (2003–2005)
- Emmanuel TV (2007)
- Enjoying Everyday Life
- Family Rosary Crusade (1987–2007)
- Friends Again (2003–2007)
- Heart to Heart Talk (1992–2007)
- Island Life (1983–1993)
- Jesus The Healer (2003–2005)
- Jesus I Trust in You (1985–2007)
- Kerygma TV (2003–2007)
- Life in the Word (1996–2005)
- May Liwanag (2006–2007)
- Oras ng Himala (2006–2007)
- Shalom (1979–2007)
- Sharing in the City (1979–2007)
- Signs and Wonders (2002–2007)
- Spiritual Vignettes (1978–1998)
- Sunday Mass (1985–2007)
- The Chaplet of the Divine Mercy (1985–2007)
- The Power to Unite (2007)
- The World Tomorrow (1989–1999)
- This Is Your Day (2003–2007)
- What Would Jesus Do? (2001–2006)

=== Sports shows ===
- A Round of Golf (2008–2009)
- Auto Extreme (2002–2007)
- Body & Machine (2001–2007)
- Clear Men Future League (2009)
- Extreme Games 101 (2005–2007)
- Finishline (2007–2008)
- Fight Night (1981–1983)
- Fistorama (2003–2007)
- Gameplan (2007)
- Golf Power (2003–2005)
- Golf Power Plus (2005–2007)
- House of Hoops (2009–2010)
- In This Corner (2003–2007)
- Jai Alai Cagayan
- Man & Machine (2005–2007)
- MICAA on KBS/RPN (1972–1981)
- Muscles in Motion (1988–1989)
- NBA Jam (2003–2007)
- NBA on RPN (2004–2007)
- NBA on C/S (2008)
- NBA on C/S 9 (2008–2009)
- NBA on Solar TV (2009–2011)
- Olympic Library (1983–1984)
- PBA Greatest Games
- PBA on C/S 9 (2008–2009)
- PBA on KBS (1975–1977, PBA basketball would return for the 2008 season)
- PBA on Solar TV (2009–2011)
- Philippine Basketball League (2008–2011)
- PCCL Games (2002–2008)
- Premier Dart (2007–2009)
- Punch Out (2009)
- RPN Sports Library (1981–1983)
- Sargo (2007)
- Sports in Focus
- Sports Inside Out (1989)
- Sports Review (1991–2005)
- The Basketball Show (2005–2007)
- The Greatest Fights (2001)
- The Main Event (2005–2010)
- Today at the Games (1984)
- TruSports (2007–2010)
- UAAP (1989–1994) (with Silverstar Sports)
- Warriors: Celebrity Boxing Challenge (2009–2010)

=== Talk shows ===
==== General ====
- A Second Look
- Boys Ride Out: Yeah Men!!!
- CityLine
- Dee's Day (2003–2007)
- Good Morning Misis! (1996–1999)
- K Na Tayo! (2007)
- Oh Yes, Johnny's Back! (2004–2005)
- Real People
- Talk Toons (2007)
- Teen Talk (1995)
- Tell The People (1983–1997)
- Tell The People... Now (1997)
- The Bob Garon Debates
- Toksho with Mr. Shooli (1999–2000)
- Youth Alive (2007)

==== Showbiz-oriented ====
- Actually, Yun Na! (1994–1996)
- Let's Talk Movies
- Nap Knock (1996–1997)
- Showbiz Ka!¹ (2007)
- Showbiz Talk of the Town (1987–1988)
- Talk Toons¹ (2007)
- The Truth And Nothing But (2000–2001)

=== Travel ===
- Biyaheng Langit (2000–2007)
- Islands Life (2003–2004)
- J2J (1994–1997)
- Road Trip (2002–2005)
- What I See (2013–2015)
- W.O.W.: What's on Weekend (2005–2007)

=== Youth oriented ===
- Barkada sa 9 (1981–1982)
- Basta Barkada (1978)
- Broadcast Campus (1973–1979)
- Chill Spot (2012–2013)
- Clubhouse 9 (1978)
- ETC HQ (2012–2013)
- ETCETERA (2011–2013)
- It's a Date (1993–1995)
- Junior Newswatch (1993–2000)
- Kol TV (2007–2008)
- Lotlot & Friends (1985–1988)
- Manilyn Live! (1990–1991)
- Match TV (2002–2003)
- RPN NewsWatch Junior Edition (2008–2009)
- Sabado Boys (2007)
- Side Stitch (2002–2003)
- Teen Talk (1995)
- Teenage Diary (1986–1988)
- The Front Act Show (2010–2011)
- Young Love, Sweet Love (1987–1993)
- Youth Alive (2005–2007)

== Regional programming ==
- Arangkada sa Nueve (2000–2003)
- Bantawan sa Kinabuhi (1981–1982, produced by Galactica Productions)
- Free to Choose (1982)
- Issues ug Tubag (1979–1980)
- Maayong Buntag Sugbo (1979–1980)
- NewsWatch Cebuano Edition (1979–1988)
- NewsWatch Central Visayas (1988–2012)
- NewsWatch Davao (1987–1989, 2003–2005)
- NewsWatch Southern Mindanao (1989–2000)
- NewsWatch Western Visayas (1987–1998)
- NewsWatch Zamboanga (1987–1999)
- Pan sa Kinabuhi (2000–2005)
- Question Hour (1983–1985, produced by Bulwanon Productions)

== Acquired programming ==
=== Asianovelas ===
- Mr. Fighting
- Oshin

=== Drama ===
==== American ====
- Seven Days
- The Six Million Dollar Man (1975–1978)

==== Chinese ====
- Romance in the Rain (2007)

==== Indonesian ====
- Pinokyo at ang Blue Fairy (2007)

=== Telenovelas ===
- Acapulco, cuerpo y alma (1996-1997)
- Alguna Vez Tendremos Alas (1998-1999)
- Canción de amor (1996-1997)
- Carita de Ángel (2003)
- Luz Clarita (1997-1998)
- La Dueña (1997-1998)
- Esmeralda (1998-1999)
- Gente bien (1998-1999)
- La jaula de oro (1998-1999)
- La Traidora (1994-1996)
- La Usurpadora (1999-2000)
- La Viuda de Blanco (1997-1998)
- Los Parientes Pobres (1997)
- Luz y Sombra (1997-1998)
- Maria del Cielo (2000–2001)
- Maria Isabel (1999-2000)
- María la del Barrio (1996-1997)
- MariMar (1996)
- Montecristo (2007)
- Piel (1999-2000)
- Por un beso (2003)
- Preciosa (1999-2000)
- Quinceañera (2000–2001)
- Serafín (2000–2001)
- Siempre te amaré (2000–2001)
- Simplemente Maria (1996-1997)
- Sin Ti (2001-2002)

=== American TV shows ===
- The $1,000,000 Chance of a Lifetime
- 2 Broke Girls (2011–2013)
- 24
- 30 Rock
- The 4400
- 60 Minutes (2013–2015)
- 7 Deadly Hollywood Sins
- 8 Simple Rules (2003–2004)
- Acapulco H.E.A.T.
- The Adventures of Superboy
- Age of Love
- Airwolf
- AJ's Time Travelers
- ALF
- Alfred Hitchcock Presents
- Ally McBeal (1998–2002)
- Amazing Stories
- Ambush Makeover
- American Dreams
- American Gladiators
- American Idol (2012–2013)
- America's Best Dance Crew
- America's Dumbest Criminals
- America's Funniest Home Videos
- America's Funniest People
- America's Got Talent (2009–2011)
- America's Next Top Model (2011–2013)
- Anderson Live (2013–2014)
- Armor of God
- Ask Harriet
- Austin City Limits
- Average Joe
- Baby Bob
- Babylon 5
- Bachelor Pad
- Bachelorette Party Las Vegas (2012)
- Bare Essence
- Battle of the Network Stars
- Battlestar Galactica
- Baywatch Nights
- Beakman's World
- Beauty & the Beast (2012–2013)
- Becker
- Beyond 2000
- Bionic Woman
- Blind Justice
- Blockbusters
- Bones
- Buffy the Vampire Slayer
- Burn Notice
- C-16: FBI
- California Dreams
- Candid Camera
- Charles in Charge
- Cheers
- Chicago Hope
- Child's Play
- Chuck
- City of Angels
- Civil Wars
- Close to Home
- Cold Case
- Combat Missions
- Complete Savages
- Conan
- Conviction
- Covington Cross
- Crime Story
- Crossing Jordan
- CSI: Miami
- CSI: NY
- Dallas
- Dark Angel (2007)
- Dark Justice
- Date My Mom
- Dateline NBC
- Designing Women
- Dharma & Greg
- Dirty Dancing
- Doctor Doctor
- Dollhouse
- Dominick Dunne's Power, Privilege, and Justice
- Double Dare
- Dress My Nest
- Dr. Drew (2015–2016)
- Dweebs
- E-Ring
- Early Today (2013)
- Ed
- Emily Owens M.D. (2012–2013)
- Entertainment Tonight (2001–2006, 2009–2011)
- Entourage
- Eureka
- Everwood
- Extra (2011–2013)
- Extreme Makeover: Home Edition
- Face the Music
- Face the Nation
- Family Feud
- Family Ties
- Fantasy Island
- Fashion Hunters (2013)
- Felicity
- Firefly
- Flash Gordon
- Foody Call
- For Love or Money
- Forensic Files
- Fraggle Rock
- Friday the 13th: The Series
- Friday Night Lights (2011–2012)
- Friends (2011–2013)
- Fringe (2008–2009)
- Full House
- Future Weapons
- Girls Behaving Badly
- Glee (2011–2013)
- Gossip Girl (2011–2012)
- Hardcastle and McCormick
- Harsh Realm (2003)
- Hawaii Five-O
- Hellcats (2011)
- Hercules: The Legendary Journeys
- Heroes
- High School Reunion
- Holding the Baby
- Hollywood One-on-One
- Hollywood Squares
- House of Carters
- House of Glam
- House of Jazmin
- How I Met Your Mother (2011)
- How'd They Do That?
- Hudson Street
- Human Target
- Hunter
- Hypernauts
- I Had Three Wives
- In Living Color
- Inside Edition
- Invasion
- Is She Really Going Out With Him?
- Island Son
- It's a Miracle
- JAG (2002–2004)
- Jake in Progress
- Jeopardy!
- Jericho
- John Doe
- Journeyman
- Just for Laughs
- Just Kidding
- Kamen Rider Dragon Knight
- Keeping Up with the Kardashians
- Kids Say the Darndest Things
- Kitchen Confidential
- Knight Rider
- Kojak
- Kourtney and Khloé Take Miami
- Kung Fu: The Legend Continues
- L.A. Law
- La Femme Nikita
- Last Comic Standing
- Late Night with Conan O'Brien
- Late Show with David Letterman
- Law & Order
- Law & Order: Criminal Intent
- Law & Order: Special Victims Unit
- Legmen
- Lie to Me
- Lifestyles of the Rich and Famous
- MacGyver
- Mad Fashion
- Magnum, P.I.
- Make Me a Supermodel (Note: Part of ETC Recall)
- Malcolm in the Middle
- Martial Law
- Masquerade
- Masterminds
- Medium
- Meet My Folks
- Miami Vice
- Millennium
- Minute to Win It (2010–2011)
- Miss Advised (2013)
- Missing Persons (1994)
- Models of the Runway (2012–2013)
- Modern Family (2009–2010)
- Moesha
- Monk
- Moon Over Miami
- Moonlight
- Murder One
- Mutant X
- My Secret Identity
- My Sister Sam
- My So-Called Life
- Mysteries, Magic and Miracles
- Name That Tune
- Nancy Grace (2015–2016)
- Nash Bridges
- NBC Nightly News (2008–2011, 2013–2015)
- NCIS (2008–2011)
- Ned and Stacy
- New Amsterdam
- New Girl (2011–2013)
- Newton's Apple
- Nikita (2011–2013)
- Nikki
- Nip/Tuck
- NYPD Blue
- omg! Insider (2013)
- Once and Again
- One Tree Hill (2007, 2011–2012)
- Outback Jack
- Over the Top
- Oz
- Parental Control
- Parker Lewis Can't Lose
- Party of Five
- Pensacola: Wings of Gold
- Perfect Strangers
- Picket Fences
- Pointman
- Point Break
- Power Rangers Series (2000–2004)
  - Power Rangers in Space (2000–2001)
  - Power Rangers Lost Galaxy (2001–2002)
  - Power Rangers Lightspeed Rescue (2002–2003)
  - Power Rangers Time Force (2003–2004)
- Pretty Little Liars (2011–2013)
- Prison Break (2005–2009)
- Privileged
- Profiler
- Project Accessory (2013)
- Project Runway (2006–2007, 2011–2013)
- Project Runway All Stars (2013)
- Psych
- Pushing Daisies
- Pussycat Dolls Present: The Search for the Next Doll
- Puttin' on the Hits
- Pyramid
- Quarterlife
- Queer Eye for the Straight Guy
- Rags to Riches
- Ravenswood (2013)
- Reasonable Doubts
- Real NBA
- Rescue 911
- Ripley's Believe It or Not
- Roseanne
- Roswell
- Sabrina, the Teenage Witch
- Saturday Night Live
- Saved by the Bell
- Saving Grace
- Scare Tactics
- Scrubs (2003–2004)
- Sealab 2020 (1980)
- SeaQuest 2032
- SeaQuest DSV
- Seinfeld (1998–2001)
- Sex and the City
- Sexiest
- Shark
- Sledge Hammer!
- Space: Above and Beyond
- Sparks
- Spencer
- Split Ends
- Sports Illustrated Swimsuit Model Search
- Standoff
- Star Search
- Star Trek: The Next Generation
- Stark Raving Mad
- Still Standing
- Strange Luck
- Street Justice
- Super Fun Night (2013)
- Survivor
  - Survivor: China (2007)
  - Survivor: Micronesia (2008)
  - Survivor: Nicaragua (2010)
- Swans Crossing
- Sweet Justice
- T. and T.
- Tales from the Crypt
- Taxi
- Terminator: The Sarah Connor Chronicles
- The Agency (2003–2004)
- The Bachelor
- The Bachelorette
- The Big Bang Theory
- The Biggest Loser
- The Carrie Diaries (2013)
- The Class
- The Closer
- The Commish
- The Dead Zone (2003–2004)
- The Dish
- The Dresden Files
- The Ellen DeGeneres Show (2009–2011)
- The Fresh Prince of Bel-Air (2009–2010)
- The Game
- The Girls of the Playboy Mansion
- The Glee Project (2011–2012)
- The Hitchhiker
- The Incredible Hulk
- The Insider (Solar TV: 2009–2011 ETC: 2011–2013)
- The Insider Weekend
- The Invisible Man
- The Jamie Kennedy Experiment
- The Jerry Springer Show
- The Lying Game (2012–2013)
- The Mentalist
- The Millionaire Matchmaker
- The New Adventures of Wonder Woman
- The Next (2012)
- The Next Big Thing: NY (2013)
- The Nine
- The Originals (2013)
- The Powers of Matthew Star
- The Practice
- The Pretender
- The Price Is Right (2009–2011)
- The Rachel Zoe Project
- The Real Housewives of New Jersey
- The Secret Circle (2011–2012)
- The Simple Life
- The Sopranos
- The Streets of San Francisco
- The Swiss Family Robinson
- The Talk (2013–2015)
- The Tonight Show with Jay Leno
- The World According to Paris (2012)
- The Visitor
- The Wizard
- The X-Files (1995–2004, 2008–2009)
- This Is Your Day
- Threshold
- Thunder in Paradise
- Tim Gunn's Guide to Style
- TMZ (2011–2013)
- TMZ Weekend
- Today
- Today Weekend
- Today with Kathie Lee and Hoda
- Today's FBI (1982)
- Today's Talk
- Treasure Hunters
- True Beauty
- TV's Bloopers & Practical Jokes
- Two and a Half Men
- Two Guys and a Girl
- The Tyra Banks Show
- Undercover Boss
- The Vampire Diaries (Solar TV: 2009–2011, ETC: 2011–2013)
- Veronica Mars
- Versus
- Voyager: The World of National Geographic
- Welcome to the Parker
- What I Like About You
- Wheel of Fortune
- Where in Time is Carmen Sandiego?
- White Collar
- Who Wants to Marry My Dad?
- Who's the Boss?
- Wildfire
- Win, Lose or Draw
- Without a Trace
- Wizards and Warriors
- WKRP in Cincinnati
- Wok With Yan
- Women's Murder Club
- WonderWorks
- World Entertainment Report
- World's Most Amazing Videos
- Xena: Warrior Princess

==== Informative ====
- Barney & Friends (1999–2003)
- Sesame Street (1970–1980, 2014–2015)

=== Australian TV shows ===
- Australia's Next Top Model (2005–2007)

=== British TV shows ===
- Banzai
- Face the Music
- Life on Earth (1984)
- Space: 1999
- The Crystal Maze
- The Thin Blue Line
- Top Gear (2013–2015)
- The World at War

=== Canadian TV shows ===
- Against All Odds
- Air Crash Investigation (2013–2014)
- Just for Laughs Gags
- My Secret Identity
- The Campbells
- Undercover Boss Canada (2014–2015, 2016–2017)
- You Can't Do That on Television

=== European TV shows ===
- Largo (2003–2004)

=== Anime and Tokusatsu ===
- Astro Boy
- Dragon Ball
- Dragon Ball Z
- Gatchaman
- Crayon Shin-chan
- Fiveman (1997–1998) (Tagalog version)
- Goggle V (1998–2000) (Tagalog version)
- Gundam Wing
- In the Beginning: Stories from the Bible
- Jetman (1997–1998) (Tagalog version)
- J.A.K.Q. Dengekitai
- Macross
- Monkey Magic
- Patlabor
- Pokémon: XY (2014–2015)
- Raijin-Oh
- Ranma ½ (1997)
- Saint Seiya
- Saint Tail
- Shaider
- Skyranger Gavan (1997–1998) (Tagalog version)
- Spielban
- Space Battleship Yamato (as Star Blazers)
- Sunvulcan
- Thundersub
- Starranger
- Voltes V
- Voltron
- Yaiba
- Yu-Gi-Oh!
- Zoids: Fuzors

=== Cartoon shows ===
- ¡Mucha Lucha!
- Adventure Time
- Alex and His Dog
- Alvin and the Chipmunks
- Amigo and Friends
- Animaniacs
- As Told By Ginger
- Batman: The Brave and the Bold
- Ben 10
- Ben 10: Alien Force
- Benji, Zax & the Alien Prince
- Beware the Batman (2014–2015)
- Bratz
- Capitol Critters
- Captain Planet and the Planeteers
- Captain Power and the Soldiers of the Future
- Care Bears: Welcome to Care-a-Lot (2014–2015)
- Challenge of the GoBots
- Class of 3000
- Codename: Kids Next Door
- Danger Mouse
- Defenders of the Earth
- Earthworm Jim
- Eek! The Cat
- Emergency +4
- Felix the Cat
- Foster's Home for Imaginary Friends
- G.I. Joe
- G.I. Joe Extreme
- Galtar and the Golden Lance
- Garfield and Friends
- Going Bananas
- He-Man and the Masters of the Universe
- Hey Arnold!
- Hi Hi Puffy AmiYumi
- Hobo
- Inch High, Private Eye
- Invader Zim
- Kiddie Toons
- King of the Hill
- Krypto the Superdog
- Land of the Lost
- Legion of Super Heroes
- Loonatics Unleashed
- Looney Tunes
- Merrie Melodies
- Mickey Mouse Club
- Muppet Babies
- My Little Pony
- Phantom 2040
- Popeye & Son
- Pound Puppies
- Rainbow Brite
- Rocket Power
- Samurai Jack
- Sealab 2020
- Science Court
- Shaggy & Scooby-Doo Get a Clue!
- Shazzan
- She-Ra: Princess of Power
- Shirt Tales
- Skeleton Warriors
- Sky Commanders
- Space Ghost Coast to Coast
- SpongeBob SquarePants (2002–2003)
- Star Fleet
- Strawberry Shortcake's Berry Bitty Adventures (2014–2015)
- Street Fighter
- Super Friends
- Swat Kats
- Taz-Mania
- Teenage Mutant Ninja Turtles
- The Adventures of Raggedy Ann and Andy
- The Adventures of Young Gulliver
- The All-New Popeye Show
- The Bugs Bunny Show
- The Comic Strip
  - Karate Kat
  - Street Frogs
  - The Mini-Monsters
  - Tigersharks
- The Critic
- The Flintstones
- The Greatest Adventure: Stories from the Bible
- The Herculoids
- The Karate Kid
- The Life and Times of Juniper Lee
- The Powerpuff Girls
- The Real Ghostbusters
- The Road Runner Show
- The Simpsons (1991–2003)
- The Sylvester & Tweety Mysteries
- The Tick
- The Wild Thornberrys
- ThunderCats
- Tom and Jerry
- Tom and Jerry Kids
- Wacky Races
- Where's Wally?
- Woody Woodpecker
- World of Animation
- Young Justice (2014–2015)
- X-Men: Evolution
- Xiaolin Showdown

¹With CNN Philippines

=== Sports shows ===
- ABC Wide World of Sports (1981–1991)
- All-Star Wrestling
- Extreme Games 101
- Gameplan (2007)
- K-1
- Main Event
- NBA Action
- NBA Playoffs
- NBA Games (2004–2007, 2008–2011, 2019–2020)
  - NBA on RPN (2004–2007)
  - NBA on C/S (2008)
  - NBA on C/S 9 (2008–2009)
  - NBA on Solar TV (2009–2011)
  - NBA on CNN Philippines (2019–2020)
- NFL Game Day
- Real NBA (2010–2011)
- Ultimate Fighting Championship
- Versus
- World Class Boxing
- World Poker Tour
- WWE Raw (2005–2007, 2008–2011)
- WWE SmackDown (2005–2007, 2008–2011)
- WWF Superstars

== See also ==
- RPTV
- Solar News Channel
- 9TV
- CNN Philippines
- Nine Media News and Current Affairs
- ETC (the former name of Solar News Channel, 9TV, CNN Philippines, and RPTV. Now airing under the SolarFlix brand)
- C/S
- C/S 9
- Solar TV
- Radio Philippines Network
- List of Philippine television shows
- List of CNN Philippines original programming
- Solar Entertainment Corporation
- Nine Media Corporation
