= The Source with Pinky Webb =

Philippine current affairs program

- Also known as: CNN Philippines The Source with Pinky Webb
- Genre: Current affairs Talk show
- Created by: Nine Media Corporation; Radio Philippines Network
- Developed by: CNN Philippines; CNN International
- Presented by: Pinky Webb
- Theme music composer: "Under the Hood" by Christopher Ashmore & Benjamin Marks
- Country of origin: Philippines
- Original language: English (2016–24)
- No. of episodes: N/A (airs daily)

Production
- Production locations: CNN Philippines Newscenter, Worldwide Corporate Center, EDSA corner Shaw Boulevard, Mandaluyong, Philippines (2016–24)
- Running time: 30 minutes (with commercials) (2016–24)

Original release
- Network: CNN Philippines
- Release: September 26, 2016 – January 26, 2024

Related
- The Final Word with Rico Hizon; CNN Philippines Balitaan

The Source with Pinky Webb (or simply The Source) is a Philippine television public affairs show broadcast by CNN Philippines. Hosted by Pinky Webb, it aired from September 26, 2016 to January 26, 2024, and was replaced by Ted Failon and DJ Chacha sa Radyo5 on RPTV's morning timeslot.

== Background ==
The program's tagline is "Where we combined the headlines with in-depth conversations with the newsmakers themselves" and "Going straight to the source of the story."

The Source focuses on in-depth, one-on-one interview with different personalities in different arenas, such as politics, government, even entertainment, lifestyle and trending and most-talked personalities in social media.

CNN Philippines' Executive Vice President and managing Editor Armie Jarin-Bennett explains that "The program gives us an opportunity to delve deeper into the issues that are most important to our viewers. It's also an opportunity to go beyond the headlines, as well as listen and engage with our viewers through social media."

The Source, also debut a segment called "In Focus", wherein features a light-hearted stories that serves as a balance to the program.

The Source or One-on-One with Pinky Webb won as "Best Current Affairs Programme or Series" in the Asian Academy Creative Awards for National Category on October 15, 2020.

== Final host ==
- Pinky Webb

=== Substitute anchors ===
- Ria Tanjuatco-Trillo
- Ruth Cabal
- Mai Rodriguez

=== Former substitute anchors ===
- Amelyn Veloso†
- Cherie Mercado

== See also ==
- List of CNN Philippines original programming
