= News.PH =

Defunct filipino evening newscast of CNN Philippines

- Logo used from 2020–22
- Also known as: News.PH Kasama si Pia Hontiveros
- Created by: Nine Media Corporation; Southern Broadcasting Network (2012–13); Radio Philippines Network (2013–24)
- Developed by: Nine Media News and Current Affairs; CNN Philippines
- Presented by: Pia Hontiveros
- Country of origin: Philippines
- Original languages: English (2012–17); Filipino (2020–22)
- No. of episodes: (airs daily)

Production
- Production locations: CNN Philippines Newscenter; Mandaluyong

Original release
- Network: Solar News Channel / 9TV (2012–15); CNN Philippines (2015–17; 2020–22)
- Release: November 28, 2012 – February 24, 2017
- Release: May 18, 2020 – September 2, 2022

News.PH Kasama si Pia Hontiveros (or simply as News.PH) is the flagship national network Filipino-language newscast program of CNN Philippines, anchored by Pia Hontiveros. The half-hour newscast airs at 7:00 PM on weekdays.

Initially launched as a public affairs program in 2012, it returned as a primetime Filipino language newscast in 2020, making it the first-ever Filipino-language primetime newscast of the network. The 7pm timeslot of the program was formerly occupied by 7pm edition of CNN Philippines News Night (which is anchored also by Hontiveros and it became the companion newscast of News.PH) every Mondays, Wednesdays and Fridays, as well as weekly current affairs programs Politics as Usual on Tuesdays and On The Record on Thursdays.

== Overview ==
News.PH is similar to CNN's Amanpour. where the host interviews newsmakers on certain topics at hand, mostly the political arena. Special editions would also be produced when other extreme issues would warrant.

The former tagline of the program is This is not a politics as usual, which been an inspiration of the defunct public affairs show Politics as Usual that formerly aired every Tuesdays at 7pm.

The newscast's current tagline is "May pinagmulan, may pinupuntahan at may malalim na dahilan." (lit. There's a source, a direction and a deeper-meaning of the story).

== History ==
=== 2012–2017; As a public affairs program ===
It was first known as a public affairs program in 2012 from the network's predecessors Solar News Channel and 9TV, which talks about political issues and current events.

==== Notable guests and special editions ====
News.PH had interviewed the likes of Sen. Grace Poe, Panfilo Lacson, Rodrigo Duterte, Vice Pres. Jejomar Binay, his son Junjun and a host of other newsmakers.

===== Iglesia Ni Cristo leadership crisis =====
After what transpired on the streets of EDSA during the INC protest, News.PH aired a special Saturday edition with former INC minister Isaias Samson being interviewed by Hontiveros on the set and spokesperson Edwil Zabala on the phone. The special ran for an hour.

===== AlDub =====
On October 28, 2015, News.PH set aside the political format to give way to News.PH: AlDub, A Social Phenomenon. Hontiveros interviewed pop culture experts and social media administrators to tackle the topic on the aftermath of the record-breaking 41M Twitter record. On the same night the Twitter hashtag #ALDUBOnCNNPH trended on the Philippines.

The episode was rebroadcast on December 30 and 31, 2015 as a special year-ender.

===== The First 100 Days =====
From July 1 to October 2016, News.PH was formatted into a weekly round-up of new President Rodrigo Duterte's first 100 days in office. Hontiveros talks to members of the administration, experts, and critics to discuss the events involving the President and his administration the week before.

==== Cancellation ====
As a part of the sweeping restructuring of CNN Philippines under Armie Jarin-Bennett, News.PH was cancelled on February 24, 2017, and its slot was replaced by Gilbert Remulla's The Political Insider a week later.

=== 2020–2022; As a Filipino-language newscast ===
On May 18, 2020, CNN Philippines aired News.PH as its first-ever nightly news program in the Filipino language, replacing the 7pm half-hour edition of News Night. Pia Hontiveros remained as anchor, and the newscast focuses on deeper meaning of the stories affecting Filipino lives.

On September 2, 2022, News.PH made its final broadcast to give way to News Night which was extended to 1 hour and was reformatted to a Filipino-language newscast.

== See also ==
- Nine Media Corporation
- Solar Entertainment Corporation
- CNN Philippines
- Nine Media News and Current Affairs
- CNN Philippines Newsroom
- Cebuano News
- Kapampangan News
- CNN Philippines Network News
- CNN Philippines Nightly News
