= News Night =

Evening newscast of CNN Philippines

- Also known as: CNN Philippines News Night
- Genre: News broadcasting; Live television
- Created by: Nine Media Corporation; Radio Philippines Network
- Developed by: CNN Philippines; CNN International
- Presented by: Pia Hontiveros
- Narrated by: Pia Hontiveros
- Country of origin: Philippines
- Original languages: English (2017–22); Filipino (2022–24)

Production
- Executive producer: Erika Factor
- Production locations: CNN Philippines Newscenter, Worldwide Corporate Center, Shaw Boulevard, Mandaluyong, Philippines
- Running time: 60 minutes (2017–20, 2022–24); 30 minutes (2020–22)

Original release
- Network: CNN Philippines; All TV (2022–23)
- Release: March 27, 2017 – January 26, 2024

Related
- CNN Philippines Network News; TV Patrol; CNN Philippines Newsroom; Balitaan; The Final Word with Rico Hizon; Una sa Lahat; Frontline Pilipinas

News Night (alternately titled as News Night kasama si Pia Hontiveros or simply News Night) is a Philippine television news broadcasting show broadcast by CNN Philippines. Anchored by Pia Hontiveros, it aired from March 27, 2017, to January 26, 2024.

The newscast was streamed online on Facebook and also simulcast on RPN Radyo Ronda stations and on All TV from September 13, 2022 to April 5, 2023.

== History ==
News Night was unveiled on March 7, 2017, as part of a continued program restructuring at CNN Philippines led by president Armie Jarin-Bennett. It replaced CNN Philippines Network News, which had survived two brand changes in nearly five years on the air. The program debuted on March 27, with PNP Chief Ronald dela Rosa as the lead guest on the first edition.

By February 2019, the program's 7 p.m. hour was discontinued on Tuesday and Thursday nights to make way for two weekly programs, Politics as Usual on Tuesday and On the Record on Thursdays. The 7 p.m. edition was ended completely on May 18, 2020, to make way for the launch of News.PH Kasama si Pia Hontiveros as the channel's first Filipino-language primetime newscast.

On September 5, 2022, News Night was reformatted as an hour-long newscast in the Filipino language to compete with other early evening news programs in Filipino such as TV Patrol, Ulat Bayan, 24 Oras, Frontline Pilipinas, and Tutok 13. It also aired on the All TV network under a content license partnership with Advanced Media Broadcasting System from September 13, 2022, to April 5, 2023.

The program aired its final broadcast on January 26, 2024, as CNN Philippines ended its live news operations on the morning of January 29 ahead of the network's closure on January 31.

== Anchors ==
=== Main anchors ===
- Pia Hontiveros

=== Segment presenters ===
- Andrei Felix (2020–24, Sports Desk)
- Sam Sadhwani (2022–24, Showbiz Spotlight)
- Nicolette Henson-Hizon (2017, Connect)
- Mico Halili (2017, Sports Desk)
- Paolo del Rosario (2017–18, Sports Desk)

=== Substitute anchors ===
- Mai Rodriguez
- Ruth Cabal
- Pinky Webb
- Rico Hizon
- David Santos
- Menchu Macapagal

== Awards ==
KBP Golden Dove Awards (Kapisanan ng mga Brodkaster ng Pilipinas)

- 2017 - Ka Doroy Broadcaster of the Year - Pia Hontiveros

== See also ==
- List of CNN Philippines original programming
