= CNN Philippines Newsroom =

Defunct newscast of CNN Philippines

- Also known as: CNN Philippines Newsroom
- Genre: News; Public service; Live action
- Created by: Nine Media Corporation; Radio Philippines Network
- Based on: CNN Newsroom
- Developed by: CNN Philippines; CNN International
- Presented by: Newsroom Ngayon anchor Ruth Cabal; Weekend anchors Mai Rodriguez; David Santos; Menchu Macapagal
- Opening theme: "Competitive Edge" by Devine-King
- Ending theme: Same as above
- Country of origin: Philippines
- Original languages: English (Newsroom); Filipino (Ngayon, Weekend)
- No. of episodes: N/A (airs daily)

Production
- Executive producers: Tricia Zafra (Morning and Newsroom Ngayon edition); Joseph Cataan (Late-Night edition)
- Production locations: CNN Philippines Newscenter, Worldwide Corporate Center, EDSA corner Shaw Boulevard, Mandaluyong, Philippines
- Camera setup: Multi-camera setup
- Running time: 30 minutes; 15 Minutes (for Newsroom Junior); 1 hour (special editions)

Original release
- Network: CNN Philippines
- Release: March 16, 2015 – January 28, 2024

Related
- CNN Newsroom (CNN/US); CNN Newsroom (CNN International); CNN Indonesia Newsroom; RPN NewsWatch; Frontline Express; Frontline Tonight; Frontline Pilipinas Weekend

CNN Philippines Newsroom or simply Newsroom is a Philippine television news broadcasting show broadcast by CNN Philippines. Originally anchored by Jing Magsaysay, it premiered on March 16, 2015, as a standalone noontime newscast and was expanded into different editions since February 15, 2016.

The newscast aired the 3:00pm (formerly 10:00am) edition dubbed as Newsroom Ngayon from January 30, 2017, to January 26, 2024, replacing Serbisyo All Access and was replaced by Wanted sa Radyo, later Frontline Express where one of the hosts, Ruth Cabal are also the hosts, on RPTV's afternoon timeslot. The weekend newscasts at 6:00pm consist of Newsroom Weekend from March 4, 2017, to January 28, 2024, replacing CNN Philippines Network News Weekend and was replaced by Frontline Pilipinas Weekend on RPTV's weekend late-night timeslot.

The newscast formerly aired the original weekday noontime edition from March 16, 2015, to April 1, 2016, replacing Newsday and was replaced by Balitaan (which currently also replaced by Frontline Express). The 3:00pm edition dubbed as Global Newsroom from April 11, 2016, to December 29, 2017, replacing Global Conversations and was replaced by Amanpour. The 9:00 pm edition from February 15, 2016, to April 17, 2020, replacing CNN Philippines Nightly News and was replaced by The Final Word with Rico Hizon. The 8:00 am edition, anchored by Ria Tanjuatco-Trillo, from 2015 to 2020. The weekend morning edition at 12:00 noon (which was later moved to 9:00 am every Saturdays, and 10:00 am every Sundays) from 2017 to 2020. The 15-minute weekend morning show Newsroom Junior Edition anchored by young contributors trained by CNN Philippines, from September 1, 2018, to March 15, 2020.

The newscast aired its last broadcast on January 28, 2024, as CNN Philippines ceased live news operations on the morning of January 29 ahead of its announced closure on January 31. Ruth Cabal, Mai Rodriguez, Menchu Macapagal and David Santos serve as the final anchors.

== Background ==
=== As a noontime newscast ===
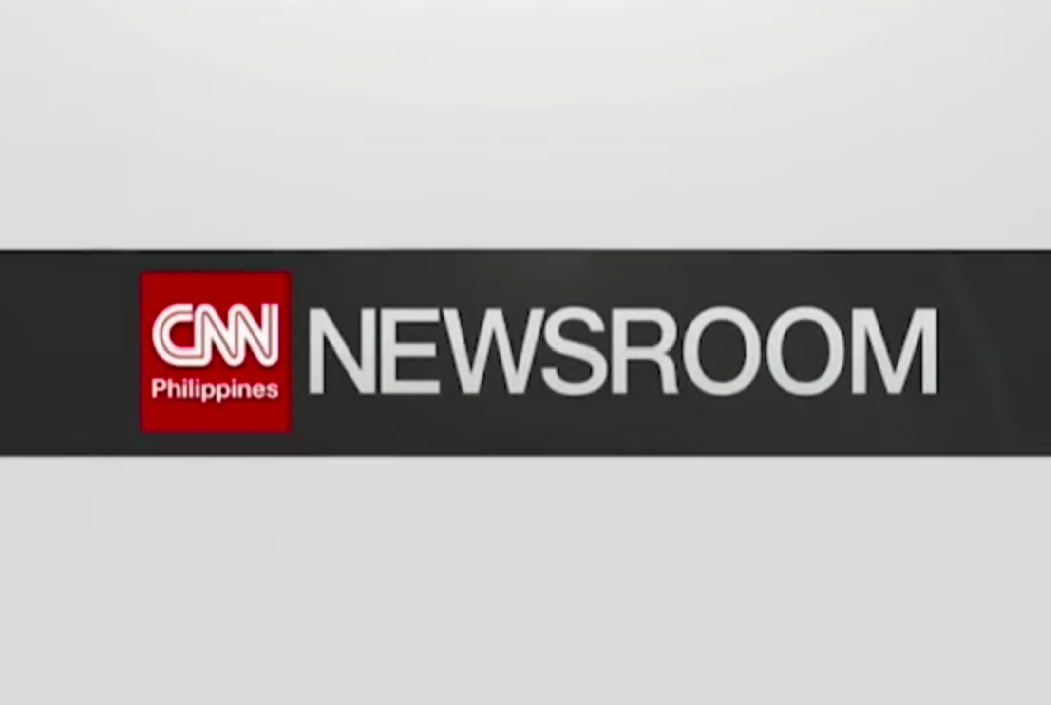
Title card from March 16, 2015, to February 12, 2016

The newscast was launched on March 16, 2015, as a 60-minute standalone noontime newscast as a replacement for Solar/9TV Newsday (which ran across CNN Philippines' predecessors TalkTV, Solar News Channel and 9TV). It was first anchored by former CNN Philippines First Vice President for News and Public Affairs Jing Magsaysay and journalist Mai Rodriguez, who was held over from Newsday.

In September 2015, Magsaysay left the newscast after his resignation following the "right-sizing" retrenchment of 70 junior staffers and contractual employees, who worked in the company for Programming and Technical Engineering divisions, leaving Rodriguez as the sole anchor for the rest of its run.

=== Expansion ===
On February 15, 2016, the newscast expanded its airtime, aligning with its international counterpart. However, the expansion reformatted from a single 60-minute newscast to three 30-minute editions in its initial run. The 8 am edition was first anchored by the late Amelyn Veloso, who formerly anchored CNN Philippines Headline News and was concurrently hosting Serbisyo All Access and a holdover of the newly launched Philippine version of New Day. Claire Celdran replaced Rodriguez in the noontime edition while the latter became the anchor of the network's weekend newscasts. The 9:00 pm edition replaced CNN Philippines Nightly News, anchored by its holdover, Mitzi Borromeo. The English-language noontime edition and the original broadcast of Newsroom were axed on April 4, 2016, to give way for the first-ever Filipino-language noontime newscast Balitaan with Pinky Webb.

On April 11, 2016, Newsroom debuted a 3 pm edition dubbed as Global Newsroom catering on international news relevant to Filipinos, first hosted by Claire Celdran. It carries the similar format of Global Conversations, which was canceled four months later (August 26).

On January 30, 2017, Newsroom launched its mid-morning edition in Filipino language dubbed as Newsroom Ngayon, anchored by Ruth Cabal replacing Serbisyo All Access. Newsroom Ngayon serves as a sister newscast with CNN Philippines' first Filipino language newscast, Balitaan, which airs at midday. The name of Serbisyo All Access remains in the newscast and dubbed as Serbisyo Ngayon.

On February 27, 2017, due to personnel reshuffling, Claire Celdran replaced Veloso at the 8 am slot while Network News anchor Pia Hontiveros took over the Global Newsroom chair. Veloso would occasionally appear in special editions, until she died of cancer on August 24.

On March 4, 2017, Newsroom launched its weekend edition, dubbed as Newsroom Weekend, anchored by the pioneer weekday noontime anchor Mai Rodriguez and Andrei Felix. It started out at the Saturday noontime slot until April 1, 2017, when it expanded to include broadcasts on weekend evenings at 6 pm, following the cancellation of Network News a week before as a result of the launching of News Night on weeknights from March 27. Newsroom Weekend later added a Sunday noontime edition on May 28, 2017 at the wake of the Marawi City crisis. Prior to a permanent weekend expansion, Rodriguez anchored special newscasts during severe weather coverage and other news of utmost importance.

Global Newsroom aired its last broadcast on December 29, 2017, to give way to the extension of Amanpour on January 1, 2018, as part of the network reorganization. Prior to the extension, some segments of the latter were usually aired on Global Newsroom.

On January 31, 2018, Mitzi Borromeo left the evening edition to pursue an advanced degree while retaining her position as host of Profiles and will appear on special editions. It was announced that former TV5 anchor and former Department of Transportation undersecretary Cherie Mercado will replace Borromeo on the anchor chair beginning February 12. from February 1 to 9, Pia Hontiveros and correspondent Joyce Ilas took turns in anchoring the newscast in the interim.

In 2018, Claire Celdran left both New Day and the morning edition, citing more time to spend for her family. Former ANC anchor Ria Tanjuatco-Trillo replaced Celdran on both shows. Prior to this, Mai Rodriguez and Ruth Cabal took turns in filling-up Celdran's vacant spot.

On September 3, 2018, Ruth Cabal and Cherie Mercado switched anchoring duties, with Cabal leading the 9 pm primetime edition and Mercado anchoring Newsroom Ngayon, citing personal reasons. CNN Philippines also launched a 15-minute weekend Newsroom Junior Edition on September 1 as part of the CNN PH Junior weekend morning block, featuring kids and young teens anchoring news bites of the day, similar to its predecessor RPN's RPN NewsWatch Junior Edition (2008–2009) and Jr. NewsWatch (2005).

In May 2019, Cherie Mercado left Newsroom Ngayon, citing her move to Canada to study. Mai Rodriguez was tapped to replace Mercado while selected correspondents are doing the weekend edition for the month of June and July. On August 3, 2019, Claire Celdran, who is returning to the network after a year, is named as the interim replacement for Rodriguez on Newsroom Weekend but she only anchors the Saturday midday edition and the Sunday edition with selected correspondents still anchoring the Saturday Primetime edition.

On October 7, 2019, Ruth Cabal returns to Newsroom Ngayon after more than a year doing the evening edition. She replaced Mai Rodriguez who is named as the new anchor for the evening edition.

On March 30, 2020, former BBC World News and CNBC anchor Rico Hizon takes over the 9 pm edition, his first after coming home to the Philippines from international news stints in Singapore and Hong Kong. On April 17, 2020, the evening edition was replaced by The Final Word, anchored by Hizon.

=== Special editions ===
When warranted, Newsroom would air special editions of the newscast, either within or beyond the current four-edition format. Emulating its international counterpart, Newsroom preempts programming for rolling news coverage and breaking stories (i.e. Senate and Congress hearings, and hooking up to CNN International during major relevant overseas coverage). However, when special events warrant during the early primetime slot, this function goes to News Night with Pia Hontiveros until 8:00 pm and only under the direst situations would warrant preemption of the weeknight 9:00 pm edition in favor of uninterrupted coverage starting from where News Night leaves off.

==== EDSA and Muhammad Ali ====
Under the initial three-split schedule, Newsroom aired additional editions on the 30th anniversary of the People Power Revolution and the aftermath of Muhammad Ali's death, respectively, with the broadcast airing four times on February 25, 2016, all but one edition airing a full hour. On June 6, 2016, Global Newsroom ran a full hour covering the aftermath of the boxer's death. Mico Halili co-anchored the broadcast with Claire Celdran and Dr. Freddie Gomez providing medical perspective, augmenting the network's extended bulletins done on the day of Ali's death.

==== The Marawi City crisis ====
At Battle of Marawi on May 23, 2017, the entire primetime current affairs block gave way to initial developments of the unfolding situation in the city with Pia Hontiveros anchoring uninterrupted coverage for four hours from 6:00 to 10:00 pm. Only the usual 10:00 pm edition of Sportsdesk was greenlit before Mitzi Borromeo resumed coverage for another half-hour. To further cope up with the developments in the city, Newsroom Ngayon added a special 2:00 pm edition during the third day of the conflict and Newsroom Weekend added a special Saturday morning edition on May 27 and a Sunday noontime edition on May 28. On the latter days of the conflict, Mindanao Hour press conferences were broadcast to serve as a lead in to Balitaan.

==== Resorts World Manila robbery ====
The incident marked the program's lengthiest uninterrupted coverage outside of scheduled political functions, totaling almost six hours. Ruth Cabal anchored a three-hour block from 10:00 am to 1:00 pm, before breaking away to simulcast CNN Newsroom International. Pia Hontiveros took the air from 2:00 to 2:30 and 3:00–5:00 pm. The coverage was heavily delivered in Filipino on the first two blocks before reverting to English on the extended slot of Global Newsroom. Again, SportsDesk was greenlit but the planned morning edition was broadcast live-to-tape at 2:30 pm, deviating from the regular protocol of replaying the live 11:00 am broadcast on the slot. The following day, three editions were aired instead of the usual two for Saturdays. A special edition was aired at 10:00 am followed by the usual broadcast at 12:00 noon and the 6:00 pm edition was temporarily moved up to 5:30 pm and ran one and half-hours covering the press conference revealing CCTV footage of the incident.

==== COVID-19 pandemic ====
On March 17, 2020, it was announced that some newscasts including all the weekday editions of Newsroom are temporarily called off until things normalize due to the skeletal workforce imposed by the network due to the coronavirus pandemic. On March 30, 2020, the network brought back a special edition of Newsroom on its 9 pm timeslot with Rico Hizon as an anchor. The special edition was replaced by The Final Word which aired beginning April 20, 2020. On April 2, 2020, Newsroom Ngayon was moved to 3 pm timeslot while the Saturday noontime edition was replaced by a 9 am Saturday edition and a 10 am Sunday Edition with Ina Andolong-Chavenia as an anchor, in the following months, Mai Rodriguez replaced Andolong on both morning weekend edition, while Menchu Macapagal replaced Claire Celdran on its 6 pm weekend edition. In June 2020, the weekend editions were anchored in Filipino language. Due to the pandemic, the weekday morning and junior editions was cancelled in March 2020, and the weekend morning edition was also cancelled months later.

== Final presenters ==
The presenters of the broadcasts are arranged according to assigned slots and priority when special editions would warrant across their timeslots.

- Ruth Cabal (2017–18; 2019–24 Newsroom Ngayon; 2018–19, evening edition)
- Mai Rodriguez (2015–16, original noontime edition; 2017–19; 2020–24, weekend edition; 2019, Newsroom Ngayon; 2019–20, evening edition)
- Menchu Macapagal (2020–24 weekend edition)
- David Santos (2023–24, weekend edition)

== Final segments ==
=== Newsroom ===
- CNN Philippines Investigates (investigative report)
- The Business Report (business news)

=== Newsroom Ngayon ===
- Serbisyo Ngayon (public service)
- Isyu Ngayon (hottest topics of the day)
- Trabaho Ngayon (classifieds and job search)
- Good Juan (human interest and inspiring stories)

=== Newsroom Junior Edition ===
- Here at Home (national news)
- Did You Know That? (facts and trivia)
- Word of the Day
- Pop Quiz (trivia questions)
- Around the World (world news)
- Weather Report (weekend weather forecast)
- Lights, Camera, Action! (entertainment news)
- Ready, Set, Go! (sports news)

== Former presenters ==
- Jing Magsaysay (2015, original noontime edition)
- Pia Hontiveros (2016–17, Global Newsroom)
- Amelyn Veloso (2016–17, morning and special editions; now deceased)
- Mitzi Borromeo (2016–18, weeknights evening and special editions)
- Cherie Mercado (2018, evening edition; 2018–19, Newsroom Ngayon)
- Claire Celdran (2016, original noontime edition; 2016–17, Global Newsroom; 2017–18, morning edition; 2019–20, weekend edition)
- Rico Hizon (2020, evening edition)
- Ina Andolong-Chavenia (2020, weekend morning edition)
- Ria Tanjuatco-Trillo (2018–20, morning edition)

=== Substitute and rotating anchors ===
- Anjo Alimario (weekend and 9 pm edition)
- Greg Chiles (weekend edition)
- Joyce Ilas (all editions)
- AC Nicholls (weekend edition)
- Carolyn Bonquin (weekend edition)
- Makoi Popioco (weekend edition)

== Awards ==
=== KBP Golden Dove Awards (Kapisanan ng mga Brodkaster ng Pilipinas) ===
- 2016 – Best TV Newscaster – Mitzi Borromeo
- 2017 – Best TV Newscaster – Mitzi Borromeo
- 2017 – Best TV Newscast – Newsroom
- 2019 – Best TV Newscast – Newsroom Ngayon

=== Gawad Tanglaw Awards ===
- 2017 – Best News Program – Newsroom
- 2017 – Best News Anchor (Female) – Mitzi Borromeo

== See also ==
- List of CNN Philippines original programming
- List of programs previously broadcast by Radio Philippines Network
