= News Café =

- Created by: Solar Television Network; Radio Philippines Network
- Developed by: 9News and Current Affairs
- Presented by: Jing Magsaysay (2012–13); Amelyn Veloso (2013–14); Mitzi Borromeo (2014–15)
- Country of origin: Philippines
- Original language: English
- No. of episodes: 114 (final)

Production
- Production locations: Solar Media Center; Mandaluyong
- Running time: 1 hour

Original release
- Network: Solar News Channel/9TV
- Release: November 30, 2012 – March 12, 2015

Related
- Profiles

News Café is a Philippine television public affairs show broadcast by Solar News Channel and 9TV. Originally hosted by Jing Magsaysay, it aired from November 30, 2012 to March 12, 2015, and was replaced by Profiles. Mitzi Borromeo serve as the final host.

== Hosts ==
=== Final host ===
- Mitzi Borromeo (2014–15)

=== Former hosts ===
- Jing Magsaysay (2012–13)
- Amelyn Veloso † (2013–14)

== See also ==
- List of CNN Philippines original programming
