= List of CNN Philippines original programming =

Programs broadcast by CNN Philippines are featured on VHF terrestrial television station RPN-TV 9 Manila and other RPN stations nationwide. These programs are owned and managed by Nine Media Corporation (NMC), utilizing the facilities of Radio Philippines Network (RPN). The local programming lineup encompasses news, current affairs, and lifestyle shows produced by diverse local production outfits.

As part of the partnership between Nine Media and Warner Bros. Discovery, CNN Philippines also broadcast acquired programming content from CNN International and CNN USA.

For the list of the previously aired programs of RPN and CNN Philippines, see the List of Radio Philippines Network original programming.

== Final original programming ==
=== News ===
- Balitaan kasama si Pinky Webb (2016–2024)
- New Day (2016–2024)
- News Night kasama si Pia Hontiveros (2017–2024; simulcast on RPN Radyo Ronda)
- Newsroom (2015)
  - Newsroom Ngayon (2017–2024)
  - Newsroom Weekend (2017–2024)
- The Final Word with Rico Hizon (2020–2024)
- Updates (2015–2024)
  - Breaking News (2015–2024)

=== News specials ===
- Happening Now (2016–2024)

=== Business ===
- The Exchange (2020–2024)
- Usapang Bilyonaryo (2023–2024)

=== Sports ===
- Sports Desk (2012–2024) (Note: Rebranded/retained Solar News Channel/9TV/CNN Philippines carry-overs.)
- Shakey's Girls Volleyball League (2023–2024)

=== Public service ===
- Batas Et Al (2023–2024)
- Traffic Center (2015–2024)

=== Current affairs ===
- CNN Philippines Presents (occasional, 2016–2024)
- Med Talk Health Talk (2012–2017; 2018–2024)
- Meet the Millennials (occasional, 2018–2024)
- Politics as Usual (2019–2020; 2021–2024)
- The Source (2016–2024)
- The Story of the Filipino (2016–2024)

=== Infotainment and talk ===
- Behind the Brand (occasional, 2018–2024)
- Business Matters (2016–2018, 2020–2024)
- Building Bridges (2018–2019, 2021–2024)
- CNN Philippines 10 (2022–2024)
- CHInoyTV (2021–2024, co-produced by Fil-Chi Media Productions)
- Dear SV (2023–2024)
- Expertalk (2022–2024, produced by Department of Science and Technology)
- Get Fit (2020–2024)
- Living Well (online viewing; 2018–2024)
- Philippine Realty TV (2022–2024)
- Siyensikat (2021–2024, produced by Department of Science and Technology)
- Thank God It's the Weekend (2019–2024)
- Where to Next? (online viewing; 2018–2024)
- Wholesome Meals, Better Life (2018–2024, co-produced by San Miguel Corporation)

=== Segments ===
- Billboard
- Bright Side
- Check-In
- News That Matters
  - The Headlines
- Snippets
- The Scoop

== Final acquired programming ==
=== CNN International-provided newscasts ===
- CNN Newsroom International (2017–2024)
  - CNN Newsroom with Michael Holmes (Monday)
  - CNN Newsroom with John Vause (Tuesday to Friday)

=== TV5 Network / MediaQuest Holdings programs ===
- E.A.T... (2023–2024), produced by TVJ Productions)
- Eat Bulaga! (1979–1989, 2024, produced by TVJ Productions)
- PBA (season 48) (2024)

=== Stories documentary block (2013–2024) ===
- CNN Freedom Project (occasional)
- This is Life with Lisa Ling (2018–2024)

=== Infotainment and lifestyle ===
- Business Traveller (2015–2024)
- CNN 10 (2020–2024)
- Hollywood Express (2014–2024)
- Quest's World of Wonder (2021)
- Vital Signs with Dr. Sanjay Gupta (2016–2024)

=== Current affairs ===
- Amanpour (2016, 2018–2024)
- Anderson Cooper 360° (2016, 2020–2024)
- Reliable Sources (2015–2016, 2017–2024)

=== Edutainment ===
- Box Yourself (2021–2024)
- Zoo Clues (2021–2024)

=== Movie blocks and special presentation ===
- Miss Universe Classics (2023–2024)
- Silver Screen (2022–2024)
