= Sports Desk =

Sports Desk may refer to:

- Sports Desk (Philippine TV program), a Philippine sports television program that has aired on various channels since 2007
- Scotsport, a Scottish sports television program shown on STV

== See also ==
- SportsDesk
