= Paolo Abrera =

Filipino triathlete, news presenter

- Born: Paolo Altomonte Abrera; February 24, 1971 (age 55); Muntinlupa, Rizal, Philippines
- Education: University of the Philippines; University of New South Wales
- Occupations: Television host, environmentalist, columnist
- Spouse: Suzi Entrata-Abrera (m. 2001)
- Children: Leona Abrera (b. 2003); Jade Abrera (b. 2004); Antonella Abrera (b. 2006)
- Website: https://twitter.com/paoloabrera

Paolo Altomonte Abrera (born February 24, 1971) is a Filipino television host, lifestyle columnist, triathlete, and environmentalist. He is the youngest child of Carlos Abrera from Coron, Palawan and Emily Altomonte-Abrera from Muntinlupa.

Abrera is the creative director of Tripleshot Media Inc, a Manila-based independent production company that create English-language non-fiction lifestyle and entertainment content for free-TV, cable, and web channels. He is a practitioner of multi-disciplinary creative arts having graduated from the University of Western Sydney with a focus on visual arts and a New York University film-making course. Alongside his career in broadcasting, he has also had stints as a commercials director and television content producer.

In 2024, Abrera became an anchor for NewsWatch Plus on RPTV and Aliw Channel 23. He formerly hosted the morning show New Day on CNN Philippines and Mornings @ ANC on ANC, the sustainable lifestyle show Green Living, the auto show Rev and the health-lifestyle show Health Matters, previously working under GMA News via Q show like May Trabaho Ka (later Hired) before the channel's rebrand to GMA News TV.

Abrera is married to prominent television host Suzi Entrata. They first met on the sports show Game Plan, a multi-awarded sports magazine show where they were both hosts independently produced by Probe Productions Inc. back then. Over time, their mutual attraction developed into a relationship. On May 6, 2001, they married at Colegio San Agustin Chapel in Makati. They have 3 daughters together.
