= Claire Celdran =

Filipino broadcast journalist

- Born: August 22, 1980 (age 45); Philippines
- Occupation: Broadcast journalist

Claire Celdran Rodriguez (born August 22, 1980) is a Filipino broadcast journalist. She previously worked at ANC, EBRU TV, Solar News Channel and CNN Philippines. In September 2020, Celdran joined Ayre Media.

== Filmography ==
=== Television ===
Year	Title	Position
2007–2011	EBRU News	News Anchor
2008–2012	The Weekly Report	News Anchor
2012–2015	Solar Daybreak/9TV Daybreak	News Anchor
2015–2016	CNN Philippines Headline News	News Anchor
2015–2017; 2019–2024	CNN Philippines Updates	One of the Various Contributors
2016	Newsroom (Noontime/Afternoon Edition)	News Anchor
2016	CNN Philippines Network News	'Trending Now' Segment Presenter
2016–2017	Global Newsroom	News Anchor
2017–2018	New Day	News Anchor
2017–2018	Newsroom (Morning Edition)	News Anchor
2018	Behind the Brand	Host
2019–2020	Newsroom Weekend	News Anchor
