= New Day (2016 TV program) =

Defunct morning newscast of CNN Philippines

- Also known as: CNN Philippines New Day
- Genre: News; Live action
- Created by: Nine Media Corporation; Radio Philippines Network
- Inspired by: New Day
- Developed by: CNN Philippines; CNN International
- Presented by: Ria Tanjuatco-Trillo; Christine Jacob-Sandejas; Paolo Abrera; Dr. Freddie Gomez; Jamie Herrell
- Country of origin: Philippines
- Original language: English
- No. of episodes: N/A (airs daily)

Production
- Executive producer: Jan Acosta
- Production locations: CNN Philippines Newscenter, Worldwide Corporate Center, EDSA corner Shaw Boulevard, Mandaluyong, Philippines (2016–24)
- Running time: 90 minutes (2016–20, 2023–24); 30 minutes (temporary, 2020); 60 minutes (2020–23)

Original release
- Network: CNN Philippines
- Release: February 15, 2016 – January 29, 2024

Related
- Daybreak

CNN Philippines New Day is a Philippine television news broadcasting and talk show broadcast by CNN Philippines. Originally hosted by Andrei Felix, Karen Jimeno, Amelyn Veloso and Claudine Trillo, it aired from February 15, 2016 to January 29, 2024, replacing CNN Philippines Headline News and was replaced by Ted Failon at DJ Chacha on RPTV's morning timeslot. Ria Tanjuatco-Trillo, Christine Jacob-Sandejas and Paolo Abrera serves as the final hosts.

The program was part of a major programming revamp following the appointment of Armie Jarin-Bennett as managing editor of CNN Philippines.

== Premise ==
The newscast's tagline is "Where we bring all the news you need and more", wherein the program will give a daily dose of relevant headlines, nationally, locally or internationally, as well as news from business, health, sports, entertainment, tech, trends, lifestyle and more to start your day right. It also offers one-on-one interview with different people to tackle latest topics.

== History ==
=== 2016–2020; First on-air and changes ===
CNN Philippines New Day premiered on February 15, 2016, replacing Headline News as English morning news program of CNN Philippines air at earlier 6 am slot, instead of 7 am (which been used by its predecessors, Solar/9TV Daybreak and Headline News.) It is the second localized edition of a program of CNN Philippines after the successful launch of CNN Philippines Newsroom. In October 2016, one of its anchors, Atty. Karen Jimeno left the newscast as she was appointed as Department of Transportation Officer, leaving Veloso, Trillo and Felix alone but she is still included in OBB. In February 2017, Veloso and Trillo left the show and was replaced by Claire Celdran, James Deakin, Christine Jacob-Sandejas and Angel Jacob as new anchors, leaving Felix the only remained mainstay in the news show. Meanwhile, Claire Celdran left the show and the morning edition of Newsroom focusing more family time, but returned to the network to anchor the Weekend edition of Newsroom, but later left the said newscast. Also, Angel Jacob left the show as she focuses on her program, Leading Women and she was replaced by Ria Tanjuatco-Trillo, Mike Alimurung, (who was anchored his program "Business Roundup") and Dr. Freddie Gomez (host of "MedTalk/HealthTalk").

=== 2020–2024; COVID-19 change and Revamp ===
On March 17, 2020, production was halted on March 18, 2020, due to the enhanced community quarantine in Luzon caused by the COVID-19 pandemic. The show resumed its programming on April 13, 2020, in a 30-minute morning newscast solo anchored by Tanjuatco-Trillo. By October 19, Broadcaster and TV Host Paolo Abrera joins Tanjuatco-Trillo, Felix and Jacob-Sandejas. Along with his departure, a new OBB and logo (which patterned to the U.S. counterpart), and theme song was also unveiled and it became a 1-hour morning news program aired from 6:00 am to 7:00 am, instead of its original timeslot from 6:00 am to 7:30 am.

== Hosts ==
=== Final hosts ===
- Ria Tanjuatco-Trillo (2018–24)
- Christine Jacob-Sandejas (2017–24)
- Paolo Abrera (2020–24)
- Dr. Freddie Gomez (occasional, 2018–24)
- Jamie Herrell (occasional, 2023–24)

=== Former hosts ===
- Andrei Felix (2016–23)
- Karen Jimeno (2016)
- Amelyn Veloso† (2016–17)
- Claudine Trillo (2016–17)
- Angel Jacob (2017–18)
- Claire Celdran (2017–18; formerly relief anchor for Veloso)
- James Deakin (2017–20)
- Mike Alimurung (2018–20)

=== Guest hosts ===
- Ruth Cabal
- Rina Andolong-Chavenia
- Joyce Ilas
- Anjo Alimario
- David Santos
- Rico Hizon

== Segments ==
- Global Headlines
- Regional News
- Business Report
- Sports Desk
- The Doctor is In
- Technology
- Talk
- Weather Forecast
- Entertainment
- Traffic Center

== See also ==
- List of CNN Philippines original programming
