= Primetime Balita =

- Genre: News broadcasting; Live action
- Directed by: Rudy Alberto
- Starring: Buddy Lopa; Marigold Haber-Dunca
- Country of origin: Philippines
- Original language: Filipino

Production
- Production locations: RPN Studios Broadcast City, Quezon City, Philippines
- Running time: 30 minutes
- Production company: RPN News and Public Affairs

Original release
- Network: Radio Philippines Network
- Release: July 3, 2000 – August 10, 2001

Primetime Balita (lit. 'Primetime News') is a Philippine television news broadcasting show broadcast by Radio Philippines Network. Originally anchored by Buddy Lopa and Angelique Lazo, it aired from July 3, 2000, to August 10, 2001, replacing RPN NewsWatch Prime Cast and was replaced by RPN NewsWatch Now. Lopa and Marigold Haber-Dunca serve as the final anchors. It was RPN's first and only late-night news program in Filipino language.

== Anchors ==
- Buddy Lopa (2000–2001)
- Angelique Lazo (2000–2001)
- Marigold Haber-Dunca (2001)

== See also ==
- RPN News and Public Affairs
- List of programs previously broadcast by Radio Philippines Network
