= The Exchange with Rico Hizon =

Defunct public affairs show of CNN Philippines

- Created by: CNN Philippines
- Developed by: Nine Media News and Current Affairs; Radio Philippines Network
- Presented by: Rico Hizon
- Theme music composer: Philip Guyler
- Opening theme: "Ideas In Motion"
- Ending theme: Same as above
- Country of origin: Philippines
- Original language: English
- No. of episodes: (airs weeknights)

Production
- Production locations: CNN Philippines newscenter, Worldwide Corporate Center, EDSA corner Shaw Boulevard, Mandaluyong
- Camera setup: Multicamera setup
- Running time: 30 minutest
- Production company: Nine Media Corporation

Original release
- Network: CNN Philippines
- Release: July 10, 2020 – January 26, 2024

Related
- The Final Word with Rico Hizon

The Exchange with Rico Hizon (or simply The Exchange) is a Philippine television public affairs show broadcast by CNN Philippines. Hosted by Rico Hizon, it aired from July 10, 2020 to January 26, 2024. In 2020 Hizon was awarded Best TV Program Host at the Asian Academy Creative Awards for his work on The Exchange.
