= Serbisyo All Access =

Defunct morning public affairs show of CNN Philippines

- Also known as: CNN Philippines Serbisyo All Access
- Genre: Public service
- Created by: Nine Media Corporation; Radio Philippines Network
- Developed by: CNN Philippines/CNN
- Presented by: Amelyn Veloso†
- Theme music composer: Hit Productions, Inc.
- Country of origin: Philippines
- Original languages: Filipino; English (during Updates segment)

Production
- Production locations: CNN Philippine Newscenter; Mandaluyong
- Running time: 2 hr (special coverage) (2014–16); 60 mins (2016–17)

Original release
- Network: Solar News Channel / 9TV (2014–15); CNN Philippines (2015–17)
- Release: June 2, 2014 – January 27, 2017

Related
- CNN Philippines Newsroom

CNN Philippines Serbisyo All Access (simply Serbisyo All Access, lit. All Access Service) was the flagship public-service program of CNN Philippines and its predecessors Solar News Channel and 9TV. It aired on the weekdays from 10:00 a.m. to 11:00 a.m. (PST) before Sports Desk. The program also had a TV and radio hook-up over 8 RPN-TV Stations and 13 RPN-Radyo Ronda stations nationwide since June 9, 2014. The program initially had a two-hour runtime until April 4, 2016, when it was reduced to 1 hour to give way for the newly launched Balitaan.

The program ended on its slot last January 27, 2017, and was replaced with Newsroom Ngayon on January 30, 2017. However, the Serbisyo All Access name still continues as a segment of Newsroom Ngayon as Serbisyo Ngayon.

== Background ==
Title card from June 2, 2014 – August 22, 2014, on Solar News Channel.

The show was the sole public-service program produced by CNN Philippines, carried over from the network's predecessors Solar News Channel and 9TV and the channel's first locally produced program in Filipino vernacular language, as it serves public needs. It is also CNN PH's only program that uses vernacular language until April 2016 when the network's first ever Filipino language newscast Balitaan was launched.

The program was a one-stop-shop for complainants, queries and feedback from the public to government organizations, the private sector and NGOs through their Action Center. Up-to-date live reports via phone line or on-site from CNN Philippines reporters also air on the program - albeit recently scaled down until the end of its run. Advisories on power, water interruptions and missing people are flashed on the final segment of the show. The show was anchored jointly by Gani Oro and Amelyn Veloso from its inception until September 2016. This was Oro's comeback project after his unsuccessful bid for the Quezon City 5th district congressional bid in the 2013 national elections and his television return after a long stint at Super Radyo DZBB.

Title card from August 25, 2014 – March 13, 2015, on 9TV.

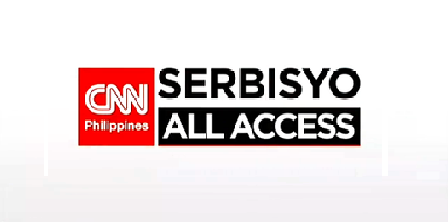
Title card from March 16, 2015 – February 12, 2016, on CNN Philippines.

In September 2016, Gani Oro left the network to join DZRJ 810 AM Radyo Bandido and 8TriMedia Broadcasting Network (coinciding with the launch of his new weekday afternoon program "Oro Mismo"), leaving Amelyn Veloso as the sole anchor until January 27, 2017.

== Final host ==
- Amelyn Veloso

=== Final fill-in presenters ===
- Ruth Cabal
- Atty. Karen Jimeno

=== Former co-host ===
- Gani Oro

== Final segments ==
- Serbisyo Komentaryo (lit. Service Commentary) - an interactive segment focusing on the listeners' take on a current issue
- Agency Response - responses of government agencies to viewers' queries
- Tawag-Pansin (lit. Noticeable) - Viewers, concerned citizens report problems in their community, usually about road potholes, electricity cables that pose as hazards, and other issues that may or may not have been previously raised to authorities concerned but have not been addressed. SAA raises the issue and coordinates on air with the concerned government agency or company and urges it to act on the problem
- Problema At Solusyon (lit. Problems and Solutions) - Specific problems or concerns of callers are addressed via phone patch by a resource person who is expert in the topic. Previous guests’ responses to viewers’ queries are read on air and also posted on SAA's Facebook page. These questions were the ones not immediately answered by the guest on the day of the live guesting, and were forwarded to the guest
- Pilipino Ako (lit. I am Filipino) - Developed in 2013, this was the precursor to CNN Philippines’ “The Story of the Filipino”. Filipinos who are making a difference in their fields or line of work, who have causes that support the common good, or acts showing good Filipino values are featured
- Pilipino Ito (lit. This is Filipino) - An offshoot of Pilipino Ako, Pilipino Ito focuses on native Filipino products or those manufactured by Filipinos, with world-class quality and reflects Filipinos’ ingenuity and culture
- Public Service Announcements and Special Reports

== Spin-off ==
Serbisyo All Access had a short-lived, albeit taped afternoon spin-off which ran one hour at 4 pm from March 16 to May 29, 2015. It was cut to 30 minutes on June 2 to give way to timeslot adjustments and Traffic Center until it was canceled on the last week of August 2015 to give way to Real Talk.

== Awards ==
Awards and nominations
Year	Award giving body	Category	Nominated work	Results
2015	Best TV News Reportage award	Sarihay Media Awards	Illegal logging sa Ipo dam watershed	Won
