= Opposing Views (TV program) =

- Created by: Solar Television Network; Radio Philippines Network
- Developed by: 9News and Current Affairs
- Presented by: Atty. Rod Nepomunceno
- Country of origin: Philippines
- Original language: English
- No. of episodes: n/a airs daily

Production
- Production locations: Solar Media Center; Mandaluyong

Original release
- Network: Solar News Channel/9TV
- Release: August 2, 2013 – March 13, 2015

Opposing Views is a Philippine television public affairs show broadcast by Solar News Channel and 9TV. Hosted by Atty. Rod Nepomunceno, it aired from August 2, 2013 to March 13, 2015.

== See also ==
- List of CNN Philippines original programming
