= For M =

- Genre: Talk show
- Presented by: Marigold Haber-Dunca; Mr. Fu
- Country of origin: Philippines
- No. of episodes: n/a

Production
- Production locations: RPN Studios Broadcast City, Quezon City
- Running time: 30 minutes
- Production company: RPN News and Public Affairs

Original release
- Network: Radio Philippines Network
- Release: April 2006 – February 26, 2007

For M is a current affairs and talk television show in the Philippines. It hosted by Marigold Haber-Dunca and Mr. Fu, and aired every Monday evenings on Radio Philippines Network.

== Hosts ==
- Marigold Haber-Dunca
- Mr. Fu

== See also ==
- List of Philippine television shows
- List of programs previously broadcast by Radio Philippines Network
