= Cebuano News =

Defunct cebuano newscast of CNN Philippines

- Logo used from 2015–2016
- Created by: Nine Media Corporation; Radio Philippines Network
- Developed by: Nine Media News and Current Affairs; CNN Philippines/CNN
- Presented by: Jun Tariman
- Narrated by: Jun Tariman
- Theme music composer: Hit Productions, Inc.
- Country of origin: Philippines
- Original language: Cebuano
- No. of episodes: N/A (airs daily)

Production
- Executive producer: Jun Tariman
- Production locations: CNN Philippines Newscenter; Mandaluyong
- Running time: 30 minutes (2013–16); 15 minutes (2016–17)

Original release
- Network: Solar News Channel (2013-14); 9TV (2014-15); CNN Philippines (2015-17)
- Release: January 28, 2013 – March 31, 2017

CNN Philippines Cebuano News (formerly Solar Cebuano News) is a Philippine television news broadcasting show broadcast by Solar News Channel, 9TV and CNN Philippines. Originally anchored by Menchu Macapagal, it aired from January 28, 2013 to March 31, 2017. Jun Tariman serve as the final anchor. The newscasts aired weekdays at 1:00 p.m.

== Background ==
=== As Solar News Cebuano ===
Ident as Solar News Cebuano from January 28, 2013, until August 22, 2014

The newscast was first known as Solar News Cebuano, an innovative program by Solar News Channel to deliver its trademark newsgathering into Cebuano language, the second widely spoken language in the Philippines. Solar News Cebuano was launched on January 28, 2013, and was first anchored by Menchu Macapagal.

=== Cebuano News ===
The newscast was then rebranded into Cebuano News on July 21, 2014, upon the impending acquisition of Solar Television Network to the ALC Group of Companies a month later, with a new titlecard and graphic introduced on August 25, 2014, following channels rebrand to 9TV. The current incarnation was launched on March 16, 2015, in lieu of the launch of CNN Philippines along with a CNN-themed graphics and a revamped news studio.

Prior to its current incarnation, the text in the lower third of the screen and most of its graphics used the Cebuano language. However, the text was switched to the English language several weeks before the launch of CNN Philippines.

On February 15, 2016, Cebuano News and Kapampangan News reduced their timeslot from their half-hour running time to 15 minutes.

On March 18, 2016, Menchu Macapagal anchored her final newscast on Cebuano News as she was relegated to a regular correspondent but remained anchor of Traffic Center on the afternoons (until her departure on the network on end of October 2016). She was replaced by her relief anchor Jun Tariman, doubling his duty as executive producer of the program. Macapagal, prior to her reassignment had been heavily criticized by viewers due to her notoriety as a former disc jockey.

=== Cancellation ===
Cebuano News was quietly axed by the network on March 31, 2017. The cancellation has been lengthily planned by the network partly due to the continuing revamps under Armie Jarin-Bennett and partly due to mounting viewer complaints of both Cebuano and Kapampangan News not limited to be carried by CNN PH's regional stations. A simulcast of CNN Newsroom's 1 AM EDT/12 MN EST slot with Cyril Vanier and Natalie Allen (Monday) and John Vause and Isha Sesay (Tuesday to Friday) replaced both regional newscasts and the 1:30 pm current affairs filler slot on April 3, 2017.

== Anchors ==
=== Final anchor ===
- Jun Tariman

=== Final reporters ===
- Dale G. Israel
- Ben Tesiorna
- Erwin Cabilbigan
- Liza Jocson

=== Final substitute anchors ===
- Amelyn Veloso †
- Hillary Isaac

=== Former anchor ===
- Menchu Macapagal (2013–2016)
