= NewsWatch Plus =

Online news service

- Website type: Social media Web portal Digital news
- Available in: Filipino; English
- Predecessors: KBS/RPN NewsWatch (1970–2012); CNN Philippines (2015–24); Nine Media News and Current Affairs (2011–24)
- Headquarters: JMT Building Condominium, 27 ADB Avenue, Ortigas Center, Pasig, Metro Manila, {{{location_country}}}
- Area served: Worldwide
- Owners: Broadreach Media, Inc.
- Parent: ALC Group of Companies
- Website: www.newswatchplus.ph
- Launched: July 1, 2024
- Current status: Active

NewsWatch Plus (stylized as NewsWatch+ or NW+) is a Philippine digital news media service. It is owned by Broadreach Media, a media investment firm (and the parent company of Nine Media Corporation) which took over the operations and assets of the now-defunct CNN Philippines. It began its operations on July 1, 2024 on soft launch, and was fully launched in August 2024. It was named after the RPN's in-house longest running flagship newscast.

== History ==
On January 29, 2024, Nine Media Corporation announced the closure of CNN Philippines, which ceased its live news productions effective immediately, and shut down entirely on January 31, citing financial losses and to shift its focus on the operations of their sister channel, Aliw Channel 23. Nine Media President Benjamin Ramos said "the employees were given their severance package and their salary for the whole month of February 2024."

Prior to the closure, Nine Media Corporation's indirect parent Broadreach Media took over the operations and assets of the former's news organization, which includes most of its news presenters and its editorial/management staff.

On June 7, 2024, NewsWatch Plus was formally announced and it is independently operating as a digital multicasting news service. The said launch is a revival of RPN's flagship newscast NewsWatch. It was soft launched online on July 1, 2024, via YouTube and X accounts that were formerly used by CNN Philippines.

On August 22, 2024, NewsWatch Plus has been granted the rights to archive CNN Philippines content from Nine Media Corporation.

== Content ==
Since its launch, NewsWatch Plus launched originally-produced digital programs while keeping most of its predecessor's remaining programs and past archived videos. Programming features NewsWatch Live, a rolling daily news bulletin, and NewsWatch Now, a primetime evening news bulletin.

It is currently airing archives of current affairs content through RPTV (the terrestrial successor channel of the former, jointly run by RPN/Nine Media and TV5 Network), and as primetime block on its partial sister station Aliw Channel 23 since August 12. On July 3, 2024, NewsWatch Plus announced that it would produce new episodes for its programs and provide access to CNN Philippines archives for subscribers. It also kept its paid/sponsored shows and segments with San Miguel Corporation.

=== NewsWatch Now ===
NewsWatch Now is the flagship evening/primetime newscast of NewsWatch Plus, officially debuted on July 1, 2024, the same day NewsWatch Plus began its news operations. It is anchored by Menchu Macapagal.

=== Programming ===
==== Current programming ====
- Building Bridges (2024–present, also aired on RPTV)
- Get Fit (2024–present, also aired on RPTV)
- MedTalk Health Talk (2024–present, also aired on RPTV)
- Negosyo PH: From Idea to Kita (2026–present, also aired on RPTV)
- NewsWatch Interviews
- NewsWatch Live (special live coverage events)
- One Small Act (2024–present, also aired on RPTV)
- T3
- The Newsmakers with Tristan Nodalo (2025–present, also aired on RPTV)
- The Other Office with Lois Calderon (2024–present, also aired on RPTV)
- The Scoop (sponsored segment)
- The Story of the Filipino (2024–present, also aired on RPTV)
- World on a Plate (2024–present, also aired on RPTV)
- Zoom In with Menchu Macapagal (2024–present, also aired on RPTV)

==== Former programming ====
- Ang Kandidato: The NewsWatch Plus Election Series (2025)
- Batas Et Al (2024–2025)
- Culinary Chronicles (2024–2025)
- Manila Conversations with Tristan Nodalo (2024–2025)
- NewsWatch Now (2024–2026)
- NewsWatch Plus Conversations (2025)
- State of the Nation Address: The NewsWatch Plus Special Coverage (2025–present, hookup with TV5, RPTV, One PH, One News and 105.9 True FM)
- The Way Forward with Atty. Karen Jimeno (2025)
- Vote Watch: The NewsWatch Plus Special Coverage (2025–present, hookup with TV5, RPTV, One PH, One News and 105.9 True FM)
