= RPN NewsWatch Junior Edition =

- Directed by: Ellen "Renz" Argaño
- Starring: see Reporters
- Country of origin: Philippines
- No. of episodes: 12

Production
- Executive producer: Lea R. Samin
- Production locations: RPN Studios; Broadcast City, Quezon City
- Running time: 30 minutes
- Production company: RPN News and Public Affairs

Original release
- Network: Radio Philippines Network
- Release: June 7, 2008 – November 21, 2009

RPN NewsWatch Junior Edition is another installation to the longest-running news program NewsWatch aired on Radio Philippines Network in the Philippines and the first reality-based TV workshop for future journalists from June 7, 2008, to August 16, 2008, and as a Magazine show on October 11, 2008.

== RPN NewsWatch Junior Edition reporters ==
Nine High School students from various schools in Metro Manila were chosen from a series of tests and workshops conducted by the Radio Philippines Network News and Public Affairs to become field reporters for NewsWatch Junior Edition. Miguel Sarne also known as "Li'l Man Guile" was the host for the First Season.

Season 2 Hosts

- Abiel Anselmo
- Alex Santos
- Charis Antalan
- Cheeno Almario
- Janeena Chan
- John David Dychioco
- Joyce Manansala
- Yasser Marta
- Miguel Sarne
- Jon Kenneth Salacup
- Trish Terrada

Season 3 Hosts and segments

- Miguel Sarne -Get Connected
- Janeena Chan -Glitz and Glam
- Charis Antalan -Our Camp
- Trish Terada -Stay healthy
- Alex Santos -Active
- Joyce Manansala - Keep it Green

== History ==
Radio Philippines Network decided to put up a reality-based television workshop entitled NewsWatch Junior Edition. It was first aired as a TV workshop on June 7, 2008. They were put in a series of workshops, training and many others. On August 9, 2008, their reports were aired and the voting process started. On August 16, 2008, edition, Joyce Manansala was declared the Grand Champion while Charis Antalan was the First Runner-Up and Cheeno Almario became the Viewers Choice Awardee. From August 23, 2008, to October 4, 2008, it was aired as a re-run. On October 11, 2008, it was aired as a magazine show where every week different stories are featured. The contestants are also the hosts of this show. Its second season was aired from October 11, 2008, to January 4, 2009. The third season had its first airing on May 30, 2009. The last episode of Newswatch Junior Edition aired on August 16, 2009, due to reformatted as Solar TV. Its former reporter Janeena Chan became RPN NewsWatch's segment reporter on TeenWatch.

== Segments ==
- Get Connected
- Active!
- Glitz and Glam
- Our camp
- Stay Healthy
- Keep it Green

== Trivia ==
- Miguel Sarne, John Dychioco and Charis Antalan were the main anchors of Jr. News (2004–2005).
- Joyce Manansala, Cheeno Almario and Alex Santos were the reporters of Jr. News (2004–2005).
- Alex Santos is the namesake of ABS-CBN news anchor Alex Santos but her real name is Ma. Alexandra Janelle Santos.
- Joyce Manansala appeared in a segment of Disney Channel-Asia.
- Janeena Chan appeared in the commercials of Cream Silk Hair Dare, Juicy Cologne, Jollibee and Rexona.
- Janeena Chan was a host of Kids TV (2004–2006).
- Janeena Chan was awarded Best Children Show Host Award for Kids TV given by the PMPC 20th STAR AWARDS for TV 2006 at the age of 13.
- Janeena Chan also appeared in 2007 Disney's High School Musical On Stage here in the Philippines.
- Janeena Chan was 2007 Candy and 2006 Total Girl model search finalist.
- Janeena Chan was featured in 2006 December WOMEN TODAY ASIA in the Young Women's Today Section as 'A Multi-talented Teen'
- Janeena Chan is a voice talent of the radio commercial for Ponds facial care and the TV Commercial for Lifebuoy Anti-Dandruff shampoo soon to be aired.
- Janeena Chan was a Storyteller of Enchanted Kingdom. (December 2007)
- Janeena Chan wrote an article for Enchanted Kingdom Comic Book Volume 6
- Miguel "Li'l Man Guile" Sarne is a DJ of Magic 89.9 FM (2007 to present).
- Miguel Sarne is the voice of the English-speaking Bronson in the movie "Sakal, Sakali Saklolo" starring Judy Ann Santos and Ryan Agoncillo (2007).
- Miguel Sarne is the voice of Raj in an Indian animation film released in December 2008.
- Miguel Sarne is Royal Tru Orange's Ambassador for Radio (2008).
- Miguel Sarne presented an award in the 1st Nick Awards in the Philippines last November 2008.
- Miguel Sarne presented the Best Male Pop Artist in the 1st Radio Music Awards on June 9, 2009.
- Miguel Sarne is still the YOUNGEST RADIO DJ in the Philippines at 14 (he started his radio career in Magic 89.9 FM when he was 11 3/4 years old.)
- Triciah Terada became a 9News / CNN Philippines correspondent.

== See also ==
- RPN NewsWatch
