= Andrei Felix =

Filipino actor, broadcaster, and television host

- Born: Alexander Felix II; May 22, 1981 (age 45); Philippines
- Other name: Drei Felix
- Education: Ateneo de Manila University
- Occupations: Broadcast journalist; television presenter; actor
- Years active: 1998–present
- Agent: Star Magic

Alexander "Andrei" Felix II (born May 22, 1981), also known as Drei Felix, is a Filipino actor, broadcaster, and television host.

== Career ==
Felix launched his acting career in 1998. He was also a video jock (VJ) on Myx. In 2010, he became a television host when he was named as co-host of ABS-CBN's Umagang Kay Ganda. He left the network in 2013 and joined CNN Philippines in 2016 to continue his broadcasting career. After CNN Philippines was shut down in 2024, he was absorbed by News5. He was named as an anchor of Frontline Pilipinas Weekend, Frontline sa Umaga and Gud Morning Kapatid, all of these are airs on TV5 and RPTV.

=== Awards ===
On November 20, 2023, Felix received a Loyalty Award from Star Magic at Manila Marriott Hotel.

== Personal life ==
Felix formerly dated Jennylyn Mercado, during her pregnancy in 2008, and his then Umagang Kay Ganda co-host Venus Raj.

He is currently engaged to sports reporter Pauline Verzosa since 2022.

== Filmography ==
=== Television series ===
Year	Title	Role	Notes	Ref.
1998	Maalaala Mo Kaya		Episode: "Typewriter"	
1998	Maalaala Mo Kaya		Episode: "Kinky Hair"	
1999	Marinella	RJ		
1999–2001	Saan Ka Man Naroroon	Mong		
2001–03	Lunchbreak		Noontime TV host	
2005–06	Etheria	Enuo	Credited as "Drei Felix"	
2007	Pilipinas, Game KNB?	Himself	Celebrity Player	
2010–13	Umagang Kay Ganda	Himself	Host	
2016–23	New Day	Himself	Anchor	
2016–24	CNN Philippines Sports Desk	Himself	Anchor	
2024–present	Frontline Pilipinas Weekend	Himself	Anchor	
2024–present	Frontline sa Umaga	Himself	Anchor	
2024–26	Gud Morning Kapatid	Himself	Anchor	

== Awards and nominations ==
Year	Work	Award	Category	Result	Source
2011	Umagang Kay Ganda	PMPC Star Awards for Television	Best Morning Show Host	Won	
2012	Umagang Kay Ganda	PMPC Star Awards for Television	Best Morning Show Host	Won	
2013	Umagang Kay Ganda	PMPC Star Awards for Television	Best Morning Show Host	Nominated	
