= The Final Word with Rico Hizon =

Defunct nightly newscast of CNN Philippines

- Created by: CNN Philippines
- Developed by: CNN Philippines
- Presented by: Rico Hizon
- Theme music composer: Patrick Hawes
- Opening theme: "Serious Business"
- Ending theme: Same as above
- Country of origin: Philippines
- Original language: English
- No. of episodes: (airs weeknights)

Production
- Production locations: CNN Philippines Newscenter, Worldwide Corporate Center, EDSA corner Shaw Boulevard, Mandaluyong
- Camera setup: Multicamera setup
- Running time: 30 minutes (2020–21); 45 minutes (2021–22); 60 minutes (2022–24)
- Production company: Nine Media Corporation

Original release
- Network: CNN Philippines
- Release: April 20, 2020 – January 26, 2024

Related
- The Exchange with Rico Hizon

The Final Word with Rico Hizon (or simply The Final Word) is a Philippine television news broadcasting show broadcast by CNN Philippines. Anchored by Rico Hizon, it aired from April 20, 2020 to January 26, 2024, replacing 9pm edition of CNN Philippines Newsroom and was replaced by Frontline Tonight on RPTV's late night timeslot.

== Background ==
The hour-long newscast, which airs every Monday through Friday from 9:00-10:00 p.m., focuses on the most significant news stories of the day from the Philippines and around the world, as well as segments which also feature the lighter side of the news. Hizon earlier said that the show's formula gives "overall view of what’s happening in the Philippines, around the world, and at the end, give them a sense of hope, inspire them that there is still a light at the end of the tunnel."

The show also features live reports from various CNN and CNN International correspondents from across the globe, with prominent ones going live for the newscast such as Nic Robertson, Richard Quest, Matthew Chance, Will Ripley, David Culver, Joe Johns, and Nadia Romero, to name a few.

=== Special editions ===
When warranted, The Final Word would air special editions of the newscast. Its first (and only, so far) special edition was during the July 27, 2020, State of the Nation Address of President Rodrigo Duterte, where the newscast aired a special hour-long edition. Correspondents delivered live and packaged reports about the SONA, while BDO's chief market strategist Jonathan Ravelas provided business analysis. Senator Richard Gordon was also interviewed live on the show.

The edition was on the heels of Hizon anchoring the network's SONA coverage for the first time, and his first SONA coverage in the Philippines since 1995. Hizon anchored a cumulative 7 hours that day – starting with the network's 2pm coverage where he joined Chief Correspondent and Anchor Pia Hontiveros and Senior Anchor and Correspondent Pinky Webb until the President's speech ended and for a post-SONA analysis with ADR Stratbase analyst Dindo Manhit and former Presidential Spokesperson Edwin Lacierda.

==== COVID-19 pandemic ====
On July 7, 2020, production of The Final Word, alongside many other shows, was temporarily halted due to a coronavirus infection in the network's headquarters in Mandaluyong. Hizon took to social media to continue the newscast. The show was brought back on the air by July 13 after thorough disinfection in the network's premises, allowing the show to be broadcast on television once again.

== Anchors ==
=== Final anchor ===
- Rico Hizon (2020–2024)

=== Segment presenter ===
- Andrei Felix (2020–24, Sports Desk)

=== Substitute anchors ===
- David Santos (CNN Philippines senior correspondent)
- Ruth Cabal (CNN Philippines anchor and senior correspondent)
- Mai Rodriguez
- Menchu Antigua-Macapagal

== Final segments ==
- Buy. Sell. Hold. (Business)
- Sports Desk (Sports)
- Hollywood Minute (Entertainment)

== Awards ==
- Asian Academy Creative Awards – National Winner (Philippines) – Best News Programme (2020)

== See also ==
- List of CNN Philippines original programming
