= Global Conversations =

- Created by: Nine Media Corporation; Radio Philippines Network
- Developed by: CNN Philippines
- Presented by: Mai Rodriguez
- Country of origin: Philippines
- Original language: English
- No. of episodes: n/a (airs weekly)

Production
- Production locations: CNN Philippines Newscenter; Mandaluyong
- Running time: 30 minutes

Original release
- Network: CNN Philippines
- Release: March 20, 2015 – August 26, 2016

Related
- Global Newsroom

Global Conversations is a Philippine television public affairs show broadcast by CNN Philippines. Hosted by Mai Rodriguez, it aired from March 20, 2015 to August 26, 2016.

== See also ==
- CNN Philippines
- Nine Media Corporation
