= Balitaan (2016 TV program) =

Defunct noontime newscast of CNN Philippines

- Also known as: CNN Philippines Balitaan
- Genre: News; Live action
- Created by: Nine Media Corporation; Radio Philippines Network
- Developed by: CNN Philippines; CNN International
- Presented by: Pinky Webb
- Theme music composer: Hit Productions, Inc.
- Country of origin: Philippines
- Original language: Filipino
- No. of episodes: N/A (airs daily)

Production
- Production locations: CNN Philippines Newscenter, Worldwide Corporate Center, EDSA corner Shaw Boulevard, Mandaluyong, Philippines
- Camera setup: Multiple-camera setup
- Running time: 30 minutes (with commercials)

Original release
- Network: CNN Philippines
- Release: April 4, 2016 – January 26, 2024

Related
- CNN Philippines Newsroom; CNN Philippines Network News; Frontline Express

CNN Philippines Balitaan Kasama si Pinky Webb (simply "Balitaan" (lit. News)) was the flagship Filipino language noontime newscast of CNN Philippines. It aired from April 4, 2016 to January 26, 2024, replacing CNN Philippines Newsroom: Afternoon Edition and was replaced by Eat Bulaga! which returned to the RPN's noontime timeslot after nearly 35 years, and Frontline Express on RPTV's noontime timeslot. The newscasts aired on weekdays at 12:00 NN PST and is anchored by Pinky Webb. The newscast aired its last broadcast on January 26, 2024, as CNN Philippines ceased live news operations on the morning of January 29 ahead of its announced closure on January 31.

== Background ==
It is the first ever Filipino language newscast of CNN Philippines, after the almost 1-year run of its predecessor, the original 12 noon edition of Newsroom. Balitaan is the second locally produced program in Filipino language next to now-defunct public service program Serbisyo All Access.

Balitaan is unique among other midday and afternoon newscasts on CNN Philippines, as it is airs on its normal format despite any live rolling coverage (such as Senate hearings or important developing stories) that might pre-empt other newscasts in their respective timeslots. Rolling coverage continues after the newscast in case the former is needed to provide added information.

== Anchor ==
- Pinky Webb

== Substitute anchors ==
- Joyce Ilas (substitute anchor for Webb; also a reporter)
- Ruth Cabal (substitute anchor for Webb; also a reporter)
- Mai Rodriguez (substitute anchor for Webb)
- Menchu Antigua-Macapagal (substitute anchor for Webb)
- Amelyn Veloso † (substitute anchor for Webb)

== Segments ==
- Balitang Abroad (World Headlines)
- Balitang Probinsya (Regional News)
- Balitang Patok (Features)
- Balitang Sports (Sports)
- Balitang Showbiz (Entertainment)

== See also ==
- List of CNN Philippines original programming
