= CNN Philippines Sports Desk (TV program) =

Defunct sports news program of CNN Philippines

- Also known as: Solar SportsDesk
- Genre: Sports news
- Created by: Solar Entertainment Corporation (2004–07; 2012–14); Nine Media Corporation (2012–24)
- Developed by: Nine Media News and Current Affairs (2012–24); Southern Broadcasting Network (2012–13); Radio Philippines Network (2013–24); CNN Philippines/CNN (2015–24)
- Presented by: Andrei Felix (Morning edition); Charles Tiu (Evening edition)
- Country of origin: Philippines
- Original language: English

Production
- Executive producer: Itos Valdez
- Running time: 30 minutes

Original release
- Network: Solar Sports
- Release: 2004 – 2007
- Network: Solar News Channel/9TV
- Release: December 3, 2012 – March 13, 2015
- Network: CNN Philippines
- Release: March 16, 2015 – January 26, 2024

CNN Philippines Sports Desk (formerly Solar SportsDesk, or simply Sports Desk) is a Philippine television sports news broadcasting show broadcast by Solar Sports, Solar News Channel, 9TV and CNN Philippines. Originally anchored by Jinno Rufino, it aired on Solar Sports from 2004 to 2007 and from December 3, 2012 to September 26, 2014. The show moved to Solar News Channel, 9TV and CNN Philippines from December 3, 2012 to January 26, 2024, and was replaced by Starting Lineup on RPTV's evening timeslot. Andrei Felix serve as the final anchor. Sports Desk airs on weekdays at 10am (with a replay at 2:30pm) and 10pm, with a weekend recap edition on Saturdays at 12:30pm. on May 1, 2023, the show will air on Primetime Weeknights at 8:30 pm.

The program aired its last broadcast on January 26, 2024, as CNN Philippines ceased live news operations on the morning of January 29 ahead of the network's closure on January 31.

== History ==
Sports Desk was first broadcast on cable TV channel Solar Sports from 2004 to 2007 and returned on Solar News Channel by December 3, 2012, with a simulcast on Solar Sports until August 22, 2014 following SNC's rebrand as 9TV.

As part of the expansion, Sports Desk also serves as a sports segment on some CNN Philippines newscasts. However, when major rolling news stories break across their timeslots, the Sports Desk program would either interrupt or pre-empt its normal broadcast. For instance, should the morning edition be pre-empted by a rolling coverage, a replacement live broadcast will take place at the 2:30 pm rerun timeslot.

On September 4, 2017, the primetime edition of Sports Desk was moved to an earlier timeslot at 6:30pm, after News Night divides its full hour single newscast into two 30-minute editions. Three months later, on December 16, Halili stepped down from his anchor role as he left the CNN franchise. The program's basketball analyst Charles Tiu, brother of PBA veteran Chris Tiu, was named as an interim host for the early evening and late night editions.

The 6:30pm edition of SportsDesk aired its final episode on December 29, 2017, to give way to the full-time relaunch of Amanpour. The cancellation was part of the network's reorganization. The remaining two editions remain intact.

In March 2020, Sports Desk halted its productions due to the Enhanced community quarantine in Luzon caused by the COVID-19 pandemic, but the news segment on various newscasts continued to air.

In 2021, after a year of absence, Sports Desk returned on the air albeit on a weekday morning basis.

== Anchors ==
=== Final anchors ===
- Andrei Felix

=== Former anchors ===
- Jinno Rufino
- Cesca Litton
- Mico Halili
- Charles Tiu

== Correspondents ==
=== Final correspondent ===
- Pauline Verzosa

=== Former correspondents ===
- Paolo Del Rosario
- Paola Palma
- Paul Garcia

== Awards ==
KBP Golden Dove Awards (Kapisanan ng mga Brodkaster ng Pilipinas)

- 2017 – Best Sports Program – Sports Desk @ 11am

== See also ==
- List of CNN Philippines original programming
