= Legal Help Desk =

- Created by: Nine Media Corporation; Radio Philippines Network
- Developed by: CNN Philippines
- Presented by: Atty. Karen Jimeno
- Country of origin: Philippines
- Original language: English
- No. of episodes: 100+

Production
- Production locations: CNN Philippines Newscenter; Mandaluyong

Original release
- Network: Solar News Channel (2012–14); 9TV (2014–15); CNN Philippines (2015–16)
- Release: November 26, 2012 – February 2, 2016

Legal Help Desk (abbreviated as Legal HD) was a Philippine television public affairs show broadcast by Solar News Channel, 9TV and CNN Philippines. Hosted by Atty. Karen Jimeno, it aired from November 26, 2012 to February 2, 2016.

== See also ==
- Nine Media Corporation
- Solar Entertainment Corporation
- Solar News Channel
- Solar News and Current Affairs
