= Mico Halili =

Filipino sportscaster

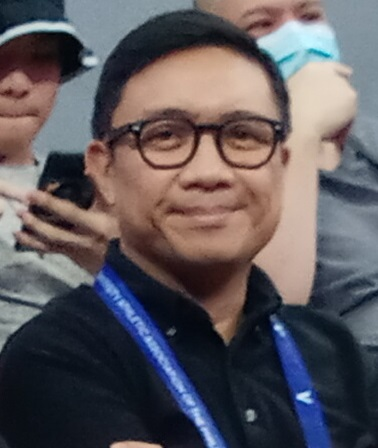
- Halili in 2023
- Education: Ateneo de Manila University
- Years active: 1995–present
- Title: Sportscaster
- Spouse: Pia Arcangel (m. 2004)
- Children: 1
- Sports commentary career
- Genre: Play-by-play
- Sport: Basketball

Mico Halili is a Filipino sports television personality, sportscaster and sports journalist. He is best known as the lead sportscaster for the basketball games of the PBA and UAAP. In October 2020, he became the Creative Director for sports programs and sports digital properties at Cignal TV.

== Broadcast career ==
Halili began his career in 1998 with ABS-CBN Sports as one of the play-by-play commentators for the Metropolitan Basketball Association games. He later became a commentator for the basketball games of the UAAP and the NCAA. In 2003, he became a play-by-play commentator for the PBA games when it was broadcast on NBN/IBC. He became the lead anchor between 2004 and 2015 (ABC - 2004 to 2008, Solar TV - 2008 to 2010, and Sports5 - 2010 to 2015).

Halili co-created and hosted the original Halikinu Radio program on NU 107 (2004 to 2006).

He returned to ABS-CBN Sports in March 2015 as the lead anchor for the UAAP basketball games. He also anchored CNN Philippines Sports Desk from March 2015 to December 2017. After ABS-CBN Sports shutdown due to issues of the congressional legislative franchise, he joined Cignal TV as Creative Director for Sports Programmes.

== Other media ==
Halili hosted web-exclusive shows such as FTW (For the Win) (2012 to 2013) for GMA News Online and The Bro Show (2013 to 2015) with Richard del Rosario and Jason Webb.

He was editor-at-large of SLAM! Philippines magazine (2011).

== Personal life ==
Halili was educated at the Ateneo de Manila (HS 1991) and completed his Bachelor of Arts, major in Communication from the same university in 1995.

He has been married to GMA News reporter and anchor Pia Arcangel since 2003. Their love story was featured in the GMA News TV program Wagas where Archie Alemania portrayed Halili opposite Glaiza de Castro who portrayed Arcangel.
