= Amanpour =

Global affairs television program

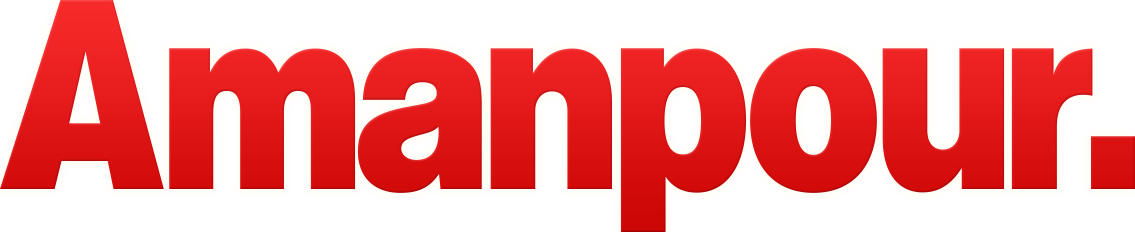
- Also known as: Amanpour.
- Presented by: Christiane Amanpour
- Country of origin: United Kingdom

Production
- Executive producer: Annabel Deegan
- Production location: London
- Running time: 60 minutes
- Production company: CNN International

Original release
- Network: CNN International (2009–2010, 2012–present); CNN (2009–2010, 2015–present); CNN Philippines (occasional, 2016; full-time 2018–2024); CNN Prima News; (2020–present); CNN Brazil (2020-present); PBS (2017–2018)
- Release: September 21, 2009 – April 30, 2010
- Release: April 16, 2012 – present

Related
- Fareed Zakaria GPS; Amanpour & Company

Amanpour (stylized as Amanpour.) is a global affairs interview television program hosted by British-Iranian journalist Christiane Amanpour, airing weeknights 6pm GMT/ 1pm ET & 7PM CET on CNN International.

The program is also aired on CNN Brazil from March 16, 2020, and CNN Philippines via tape-delay on an occasional basis since August 20, 2016, when Philippine affairs in terms of global context are tackled by the show. The program relaunched full-time on the channel on January 1, 2018 to until January 29, 2024.

== Format ==
The weekday program has three segments. The first is called "The Brief", in which Amanpour tells a story from a different perspective, and often adds her personal experiences. The second segment is typically an interview with a high profile news maker or politician, while the final segment is called "Imagine a World", which is Amanpour's final thought on a topic that was not discussed on the show.

When Amanpour is reporting in the field, she anchors the entire program remotely.

=== Interviews ===
The show has featured a number of high-profile interviews, including Joko Widodo, Robert Mugabe, Jacob Zuma, Queen Rania of Jordan, Son of Hamas author Mosab Hassan Yousef, Israeli Defense Minister Ehud Barak, a rare joint interview with Sec. of State Hillary Clinton and Sec. of Defense Bob Gates, a joint interview with the U.N. Ambassadors to India, Afghanistan and Pakistan, Mohamed ElBaradei, Hans Blix, NATO Secretary General Rasmussen, Gen. McChrystal, the first-ever joint interview with media power couple Tina Brown and Harold Evans, Gen. David Petraeus, and the then Vice President, now former President of Nigeria, Goodluck Jonathan.

== History ==
Amanpour debuted on September 21, 2009 on CNN International. It airs weekdays on CNN International and Sundays on CNN/US. The show's first run ended in April 2010 after Amanpour departed CNN to host This Week on American network ABC.

Upon her return to the network in 2011, CNN International relaunched Amanpour. The series returned on April 16, 2012 and airs weekdays in the afternoon in North America and during primetime in Europe.

In November 2015, Amanpour. began airing on CNN in the US on weekdays.

On August 20, 2016, Amanpour was also aired on CNN Philippines via tape-delay as a dry-run, but was axed a week after premiering on the network's local programming for unknown reasons. It eventually returned on August 31, 2016, albeit the program would broadcast on an occasional basis when Philippine affairs that affect the global stage are featured. The program relaunched full-time by January 1, 2018, replacing timeslots formerly occupied by the local franchise's Global Newsroom and the early evening edition of Sports Desk (both were axed due to network reorganization); thus extending its coverage to other international issues which were formerly featured in the former.

On December 4, 2017, it was announced that Amanpour would re-air on PBS as an interim replacement for Charlie Rose, after allegations of sexual harassment against Rose led to his program's cancellation. The show on PBS was branded as Amanpour on PBS. On May 8, 2018, PBS confirmed that the show, retitled Amanpour & Company, would be the official replacement to Charlie Rose and the new show began airing on September 10, 2018.

Christiane Amanpour won Television Personality of the Year for the show in 2015 at the AIB Media Excellence Awards. She also won at the Gracie Awards in 2016 for best Talk Show - News.

On September 10, 2018, as part of a revamp of CNN International's European primetime line-up, Amanpour moved to the 19.00 CET/18.00 UK timeslot and expanded to be a one-hour show.

On March 16, 2020, the program started its daily broadcast on CNN Brazil, with Portuguese subtitles.

On October 19, 2026, Christiane Amanpour announced that she would be leaving CNN sometime in June 2027.

== Reception ==
Amanpour has received generally positive reviews from television critics. Mattie Kahn of Elle wrote, "Charismatic and brilliant."
