= Amelyn Veloso =

Filipino journalist (1974–2017)

- Born: Amelyn Esther Veloso; April 25, 1974; Cebu City, Philippines
- Died: August 24, 2017 (aged 43); Manila, Philippines
- Resting place: St. John the Baptist Columbary and Park, Taytay, Rizal, Calabarzon, Philippines
- Other name: Amelyn Veloso-Zapanta
- Occupations: News anchor, journalist
- Years active: 1997–2017
- Agents: IBC (1997–1998) ABC/TV5 (1998–2013); Solar News Channel/9TV/CNN Philippines (2013–2017)
- Spouse: Rodney Zapanta
- Children: 1

Amelyn Esther Veloso-Zapanta (April 25, 1974 – August 24, 2017) was a Filipina broadcast journalist of CNN Philippines.

Before her death, she was the anchor of the morning show New Day, CNN Philippines Newsroom, and the public service program Serbisyo All Access. She was known for her signature trademark line, "Be Well" at the end of her programs. A co-anchor of Solar Daybreak from January 7, 2013 until August 22, 2014. she had stints with IBC 13 and TV5.

== Death ==
On August 24, 2017, Veloso died due to liver metastasis secondary to breast cancer.
