= Armie Jarin-Bennett =

Filipina journalist

Armie Jarin-Bennett is a Filipina journalist based in Manila, Philippines. She is the current President of Nine Media Corporation, owner of CNN Philippines (now RPTV), the country's very own local franchise of Cable News Network, since October 9, 2016. She is also the Executive Vice President for News and Current Affairs and Managing Director of the network since November 4, 2015, replacing Jing Magsaysay who resigned in September 2015.

Before going back home to work for CNN Philippines, she worked for CNN for 17 years.

== Background ==
She did a BA in Mass Communications at De La Salle University between 1984-1988, and started her media career as a news writer and top-of-the-hour radio newscaster of stations 99.5 RT (now 99.5 Play FM), Kiss FM 101.1 (now 101.1 Yes The Best) and Citylite 88.3 (now Jam 88.3) (the first radio affiliate of CNN in the country), under Francis Lumen, from 1989 to 1996, at the same time, she did voice-over for radio commercials. She unsuccessfully auditioned to succeed Tina Monzon-Palma as anchor of GMA Headline News.

She moved to Atlanta to work as an intern of CNN Radio, doing multi-tasking as floor director, teleprompter operator, and video journalist in 1996. She was hired by CNN Headline News as a producer and writer in 1997, then moved to CNN International in 2000, started as a news producer, and rose through the ranks into supervising producer in 2004 and executive producer in 2008, overseeing the 24/7 daily news operations of the news network.

She was appointed by the network as the Executive Director for Content Sales & Partnerships based in Hong Kong, supervising the work of all CNN local affiliates in the Asia Pacific, including CNN Philippines. In 2012, she was awarded for the Outstanding Live Coverage of a Current News Story – Long Format by the Emmy Awards for the coverage of the Egypt Revolution. In the following year, she was Emmy nominated again for coverage of Typhoon Haiyan.

She resigned from her CNN position in 2020 for unknown reasons.

== Personal ==
She is married to Headline News director, John Bennett.

== See also ==
- CNN Philippines
