= CNN Philippines =

Defunct free-to-air television network in the Philippines

- Final logo used by CNN Philippines from 2015 to 2024.
- Type: Free-to-air television network
- Country: Philippines
- Broadcast area: Nationwide
- Headquarters: Upper Ground Floor Worldwide Corporate Center, Shaw Boulevard corner EDSA, Mandaluyong, Philippines

Programming
- Languages: English (main); Filipino (for News Night, Newsroom, Balitaan, Eat Bulaga!, PBA and Updates)

Ownership
- Owner: Nine Media Corporation (Programming and Broadcast Facilities); Warner Bros. Discovery (Brand licensing of CNN)
- Parent: Radio Philippines Network (Broadcast Spectrum and License)
- Key people: D. Edgard A. Cabangon (Chairman, Nine Media Corporation, Aliw Broadcasting Corporation and RPN); Benjamin Ramos (President, Nine Media Corporation, Aliw Broadcasting Corporation and President and CEO, RPN)

History
- Launched: March 16, 2015; 11 years ago
- Replaced: 9TV
- Closed: January 31, 2024 (8 years, 10 months and 15 days)
- Replaced by: RPTV (free-to-air television); CNN International Asia Pacific; NewsWatch Plus (news operations and assets)
- Former names: On RPN VHF Channel 9: C/S 9 (2008–2009); Solar TV (2009–2011); ETC (2011–2013); Solar News Channel (2013–2014); 9TV (2014–2015)

CNN Philippines (abbreviated sometimes as CNN PH) was a Philippine free-to-air television network owned and operated by Nine Media Corporation, together with Radio Philippines Network (RPN), under a license from Warner Bros. Discovery Asia-Pacific. CNN Philippines was the fifth local franchise of CNN in Asia after CNN Indonesia, CNN Türk, CNN Arabic, and CNN-IBN (now CNN-News18 in India). It was formed after a brand licensing agreement with CNN Worldwide and Nine Media in 2014. It then launched on March 16, 2015, replacing 9TV, and was available on various platforms, including cable, satellite, live-streaming, and RPN's television stations.

CNN Philippines' local programming was produced from the Worldwide Corporate Center in Mandaluyong. It maintained its analog transmitter located at the RPN Compound in Diliman, Quezon City, while digital transmission facilities were located at the Crestview Subdivision in Antipolo, Rizal.

Citing financial losses, CNN Philippines ceased its operations on January 31, 2024. Its terrestrial television channel space was replaced by RPTV, a channel co-owned by Nine Media Corporation and TV5 Network, while its remaining news operations and assets were absorbed by Nine Media's indirect parent Broadreach Media Holdings to form NewsWatch Plus.

== Background ==
=== Solar TV (2009–2011) ===
Solar TV was launched on November 29, 2009, on RPN as part of a blocktime agreement with Solar Entertainment. It ended its broadcast on February 25, 2011, after Solar bought a stake of RPN; programming of ETC (now Solar Flix) was then transferred to the network. Following its closure, Solar TV retains as a Solar's broadcast media arm.

=== Talk TV (2011–2012) ===
Talk TV ran March 2, 2011 to October 29, 2012 on SBN Channel 21. It was formed by the Solar Television Network (now Nine Media Corporation), then-owned by Solar Entertainment Corporation after the latter led the privatization of the state-sequestered Radio Philippines Network (RPN) in 2011. The first programs that aired on the channel were Dateline NBC, The Today Show, Today's Talk, NBC Nightly News, Inside Edition, The Tonight Show with Jay Leno, and Late Show with David Letterman.

Solar News, known for its back-to-basics and unbiased journalism, was formed in January 2012 during the coverage of the impeachment trial of former Chief Justice Renato Corona. Post-EDSA revolution ABS-CBN newsmen Pal Marquez, Jing Magsaysay and Pia Hontiveros, together with former ANC anchors Claire Celdran, Mai Rodriguez and Nancy Irlanda, were known as the pillars of Solar News. A reporting team was composed of the former reporters of RPN NewsWatch, the sole and longest-running English newscast of Radio Philippines Network, which stopped airing in 2012 due to RPN's privatization.

The hourly news bulletin Solar News Update (later renamed Headlines) first aired in March 2012, followed by the primetime newscast Solar Network News and Solar Nightly News, which respectively started airing on June 18 and July 16 of the same year; Daybreak and Newsday started airing on October 1. On October 30, Talk TV finally signed off to make way for the launching of the first 24-hour English news channel on both cable TV and free-to-air TV: the Solar News Channel.

=== Solar News Channel (2012–2014) ===
Dubbed then as the "First 24/7 All-English News Channel on Free TV," Solar News Channel (SNC) replaced Talk TV. SNC was launched on October 30, 2012 on SBN Channel 21.

During its first months of operation, the channel produced local newscasts such as the native language newscast Solar News Cebuano, the sports newscast Solar Sports Desk, and public affairs programs Legal HD, Medtalk, News.PH, Opposing Views, Elections 2013, and News Cafe. 60 Minutes, Top Gear, Undercover Boss, and the Stories documentary block were also launched for SNC. SNC then launched its own mobile application for smartphone users with features such as live streaming, catch-up episodes (newscasts and Stories) and news from solarnews.ph.

In November 2013, San Miguel Corporation President and COO Ramon S. Ang personally acquired the minority stake of STVNI; at the time, brothers Wilson and William Tieng were the then-majority stockholders of STVNI. On December 1, 2013, SNC moved to RPN Channel 9 to improve signal and cate tor a wider audience after RPN's former occupant and Solar Entertainment-owned ETC returned to SBN Channel 21. (ETC was aired in SBN-21 from 2008 to 2011 then at RPN-9 from 2011 to 2013.) Solar News Channel then began to phase out its Solar branding on its newscast as it leaned away from the Tiengs. It also launched the Kapampangan national newscast Kapampangan News along with the public service program Serbisyo All Access in the Filipino language. Solar News Channel closed down before midnight on August 22, 2014.

=== 9TV (2014) ===
SNC was relaunched as 9TV on August 23, 2014. The Solar brand on Channel 9 was retired after the ALC Group of Companies, through Aliw Broadcasting Corporation, bought out the 34% stake of the Tiengs' group with Solar Television Network and RPN 9; the Tiengs had been losing money after they invested in RPN 9 and focused on the cable channels of Solar Entertainment Corporation. Solar News was then rebranded as 9News, with the programming and personnel retained. Kids Weekend, Home Shopping Network, TV Mass for the Homebound, along with local informative shows like Something to Chew On, Boys' Ride Out, Drive, Good Company, Two Stops Over and Bogart Case Files, became part of 9TV's programming line-up.

Controversies hounded 9TV, as one of the motorpool drivers of the news division allegedly violated traffic rules when a news crew cab entered a no-left/no-entry road while on hazard in the Balara area on September 14, 2014. 9News management then imposed disciplinary actions and penalties against the driver and his designated reporter and cameraman.

=== Transition to CNN Philippines (2014–2015) ===
On October 14, 2014, Cabangon-Chua announced their partnership with the Turner Broadcasting System's Cable News Network (CNN). Under the brand licensing agreement between Turner Broadcasting System and Nine Media, the latter would pay CNN an undisclosed amount per month for programs and expertise from CNN International and CNN U.S. to air in CNN Philippines; this was in exchange for locally produced news, current affairs and lifestyle programs, and rolling news coverage from 9News, all based on the standards of CNN. 9News would also be trained by CNN staff at the CNN Center in Atlanta, Georgia to enhance their reporting in order to help them contribute reports to CNN International and its news bureaus worldwide; consultants from the latter would additionally help Nine Media/RPN for further development and expansion of CNN Philippines. Finally, the official news website, 9news.ph would be redesigned and changed into CNNPhilippines.com.

On the day of the soft launching of CNN Philippines held on October 14, 2014 at Solaire Resort & Casino, CNN Worldwide President Jeff Zucker stated:

The global news gathering power of CNN combined with the local perspective Nine Media Corporation brings enables us to provide first-class news and information to millions of Filipinos in a way that we have not been able to previously. I couldn't be happier to welcome CNN Philippines to the CNN family.

The following day, Presidential Communications Operations Office (PCOO) Secretary Sonny Coloma was the guest of honor at the trade launch of CNN Philippines at the Philippine International Convention Center. RPN, the broadcaster of CNN Philippines, was under the portfolio of PCOO, also known as Media Ng Bayan, from 1986 (sequestration from the Benedicto family, the original owner of RPN) until 2011 (when Solar Entertainment Corporation privatized the station). However, PCOO still owned 20% minority share on RPN.

As a part of its transition to CNN Philippines, 9TV temporarily used a green screen as its news studio in December 2014. Along with newsroom renovations and strategic hiring of personnel, its newscasts began adopting the CNN-style on-air graphics starting on January 15, 2015 in time for 9TV's coverage of Pope Francis's visit to the country. Home Shopping Network (now Shop TV) and Kids Weekend block were axed in the same month; foreign non-CNN produced programs (NBC and CBS programs) were also dropped in February, including NBC Nightly News.

== History ==
=== Launch and first eight months ===
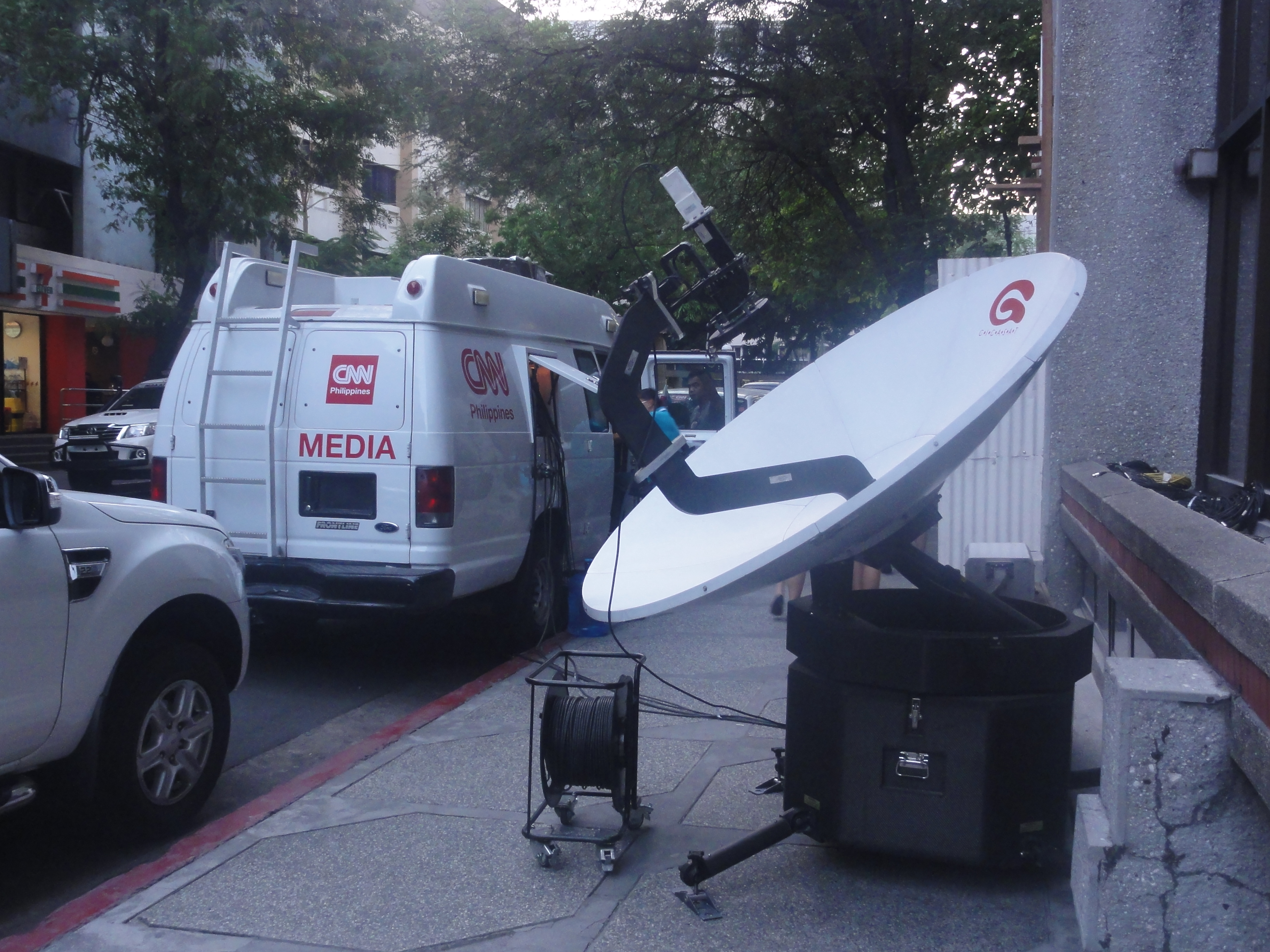
Satellite news gathering truck of CNN Philippines in Salcedo Village, Makati.

CNN Philippines was launched on March 16, 2015 with the tagline: "We Tell The Story of the Filipino." At its inception, the network retained many of its predecessor's newscasts, current affairs, and lifestyle programs—some rebranded, others left unchanged—while gradually integrating CNN-produced content into its lineup. During its initial broadcast, the channel continued using the 4:3 standard definition format, although the 14:9 aspect ratio was tested overnight. Beginning in Holy Week of 2015, CNN Philippines transitioned to full-time broadcasts in the 16:9 widescreen format, aligning with other CNN channels worldwide. However, the output was presented in a 14:9 letterboxed format on both free-to-air and cable/satellite platforms. This made CNN Philippines the first free-to-air television channel in the country to adopt the 14:9 aspect ratio for widescreen presentation—a distinction it held until April 2017.

=== Magsaysay out, Jarin-Bennett in ===
In September 2015, Nine Media Corporation President Reggie Galura and CNN Philippines Senior Vice President for News and Current Affairs Jing Magsaysay left the network after the "right-sizing" retrenchment of 70 junior staffers and contractual employees who worked in its Programming and Technical Engineering divisions. Additionally, Magsaysay left his sole newscast, CNN Philippines Newsroom, leaving Mai Rodriguez as the solo anchor.

On November 2, 2015, CNN International's Armie Jarin-Bennett took over as the managing editor of CNN Philippines, replacing Magsaysay. Bennett had been the head of CNN Content Sales and Partnerships in Asia Pacific after 17 years of working as a writer and producer on various programs for CNN and CNN International; in particular, she had earned a 2012 Emmy Award for coverage of the Egyptian Revolution of 2011 and a nomination for Typhoon Haiyan coverage in 2013. Born and raised in Manila, Jarin-Bennett had begun her career as radio newscaster before moving as an intern in the CNN Center in 1996.

=== Expansion of news operation and first anniversary ===
On February 15, 2016, CNN Philippines updated its station bumpers, removed the station's voiceover, and improved intros for newscasts to resemble some CNN International programs like CNN Newsroom, CNN Today, International Desk, CNN Money, and CNN Money View; newer bumpers for general segments and current affairs shows followed suit. The channel also changed their theme music for their newscasts and bumpers while also adding new programs like the Philippines edition of New Day. Nightly News was axed in favor of an expanded Newsroom, making CNN Philippines Network News the sole lineal brand holdover from its Solar tenure. Former ABS-CBN anchor Pinky Webb also joined CNN Philippines where she became the main anchor of Balitaan, its first ever newscast in Filipino.

Since February 2016, CNN Philippines started to phase out current affairs shows that debuted under Solar News Channel (Legal Help Desk), former CNN shows (Eco-Solutions), and HLN produced shows (Nancy Grace and Dr. Drew On Call) that had been aired as filler programming; they were replaced by newer staple programming such as Smerconish and news programming.

=== Emphasis on local and global programming ===
In August 2016, CNN Sans (the corporate font of their mother network) replaced the Helvetica that had been used in the on-air graphics during CNN Philippines' transition and first year of operation; the new font was implemented in all CNN-operated and CNN-franchised networks worldwide. The font was slowly rolled out upon its February 2016 revamp of its on-air presentations, and during PiliPinas Debates 2016 (vice presidential leg).

HLN-produced programs such as Morning Express, Weekend Express, and The Daily Share (which ended on HLN's programming on mid-November 2016) were axed from the local lineup during the main network's coverage of the respective Republican and Democratic National Conventions, but they returned on August 23 when the premieres of CNN International programming (Amanpour and Anderson Cooper 360°) were placed on hold. Amanpour (whose select stories were featured on CNN Philippines's Global Conversations) was eventually aired but only during its discussions of Philippine affairs in global contexts; its first independent broadcast on CNN Philippines was on August 31, 2016 with Christiane Amanpour interviewing Senators Alan Peter Cayetano and Leila de Lima. CNN U.S. programming (The Lead, Smerconish, and Reliable Sources) that aired during CNN Philippines' first year of operation were also limited then. Erin Burnett OutFront remained on the local lineup until September 22, 2016.

Since mid-September 2016, HLN programming was relegated to the cable-only overnight graveyard slot to make way for the expansion of current affairs blocks. The Service Road with James Deakin debuted on September 19 while The Source with Pinky Webb followed suit a week later. Two non-CNN programs (60 Minutes and Undercover Boss: Canada) were axed during the same month.

On October 9, 2016, Armie Jarin-Bennett was appointed as the president of Nine Media Corporation. With her promotion, more CNN International shows began airing as weekend staples, notably The Art of Movement and Vital Signs with Dr. Sanjay Gupta, which premiered near the end of October.

=== Second year, sweeping restructuring ===
Sweeping restructuring started out in February of 2017, starting with the further replacement of shows carried over from the network's predecessors. Newsroom was further expanded to include a mid-morning Filipino newscast with Ruth Cabal, a former news anchor and reporter from GMA Network, which replaced Serbisyo All Access on February 6; it started a weekend edition on March 4. Additional political shows also premiered such as Political Insider with Gilbert Remulla, which was later axed in July 2017, 4 months after its premiere due to the host's controversies involving his strong opinion stance leaning towards then-President Rodrigo Duterte on engaging word wars against with the Liberal Party supporters on Twitter. CNN Philippines Network News would be retired and replaced with News Night with Pia Hontiveros on March 27, and weekend slots would be filled by Sports Desk Weekend on March 11. Upon cancellation of Cebuano News and Kapampangan News by the end of March, the second hour of CNN Newsroom (simulcast from CNN International) replaced their vacant slots.

In April 2017, CNN Philippines reconfigured to a 16:9 anamorphic widescreen standard-definition format, eliminating the use of letterboxing. The change allowed for a widescreen presentation, optimizing the viewing experience for viewers with compatible widescreen televisions. CNN Philippines also introduced the new slogan "At the Heart of The Story."

=== Weekend programming expansion, extension of partnership and COVID-19 pandemic ===
On September 1, 2018, CNN Philippines launched its weekend morning block, consisting of cartoons from sister channel Cartoon Network, infotainment show KidDo, and a 15-minute "junior edition" of its news program Newsroom hosted by teenagers. Initially called the CNN Philippines Junior, it was similar to the Kids Weekend block from its predecessor, 9TV. This additionally marked the return of the Cartoon Network block on RPN after it was discontinued in 2010.

On November 13, 2019, CNN Philippines announced its intention to air weekend broadcasts of selected NBA games on an interim basis as a blocktimer following the expiration of broadcast rights of Solar Entertainment and ABS-CBN Sports which led to the closure of NBA Premium TV and BTV (CNN Philippines's free TV partner, RPN 9, previously aired the games also under C/S 9 or Solar TV affiliation). This was due to the pending evaluation of the joint bid of ABS-CBN Sports and Cignal TV/ESPN5 (now One Sports) for the aforementioned broadcast rights.

Based from a December 2019 report of Media Newser Philippines, Nine Media Corporation and WarnerMedia agreed to extend its 2014 brand licensing agreement until the end of 2024. The extension of partnership was brought about by the positive performance, improved ratings, and financial stability of CNN Philippines.

From March 18 to 22, 2020, CNN Philippines was forced to go off-air after an employee working at the Worldwide Corporate Center, the network's headquarters, was confirmed positive with COVID-19. The channel resumed broadcast operations on March 23, 2020. However, the network went off-air again on July 7, 2020 when a utility staff member tested positive. Broadcasts resumed on July 11, 2020.

On January 10, 2022, CNN Philippines was forced to go off-air again for the third time due to limited staff and lack of implementation of health protocols in the broadcast center. Broadcasts resumed on January 11, 2022 at noon.

On December 22, 2023, TV5 Network entered into a blocktime agreement with Nine Media Corporation to broadcast the Philippines' longest-running noontime variety and entertainment show Eat Bulaga! and selected games from the Philippine Basketball Association (PBA) every Saturday and Sunday on CNN Philippines starting January 6, 2024. This marked the return of the two programs previously aired on RPN in order to strengthen CNN Philippines' weekend line-up.

=== Closure ===
On January 17, 2024, Media Newser Philippines reported that Nine Media Corporation and CNN mutually agreed to terminate its brand licensing agreement ahead of its expiry by the end of the year due to increasing financial losses, poor ratings of the network, and waning support from advertisers. Reportedly, the Radio Philippines Network branding is scheduled to return to its free TV affiliates for some time in the future while CNN assesses its future options, including possible plans to set up its own news bureau in the Philippines.

On January 18, 2024, CNN Philippines confirmed that it would cease live news productions immediately, after which it shut down entirely end of the month on January 31; they cited financial losses and a decision to shift its focus toward the operations of their sister channel, Aliw Channel 23 which carried the simulcast of selected programs of sister station DWIZ-AM. (Note: Attributed to multiple references:) Nine Media President Benjamin Ramos said: "the employees were given their severance package and their salary for the whole month of February."

CNN Philippines will discontinue operations on all media platforms effective Wednesday, January 31, 2024.

A trusted source of news and information, CNN Philippines is accessible on free-to-air TV, cable, and digital platforms. To our staff, we thank you for your commitment and dedication. To our partners, including CNN Worldwide / Turner Broadcasting Corporation, we are grateful for your support.

And to our viewers, our sincerest gratitude for your loyalty and trust over the past 9 years.

— CNN Philippines' statement on the channel's closure was broadcast and shared across their social media accounts

On January 31, 2024, CNN Philippines quietly signed-off for the last time after their final interstitial A Moment of Serenity was played. Its last program aired was an episode of Building Bridges. On the same hour, all digital platforms of CNN Philippines were permanently deactivated.

=== Post-closure, NewsWatch Plus ===
On February 1, 2024, the channel relaunched as RPTV, with programming of TV5 and One PH, as well as re-runs of Nine Media's current affairs programs, carried over onto the new channel. The channel is a joint venture between Nine Media and TV5 Network, became the content providers of RPN. This includes TV5 programming like Eat Bulaga! (which is also one of the RPN's original programming) and selected PBA games (who's two previously aired on RPTV's predecessor, CNN Philippines) and news and current affairs outsourced from News5, TV5 news division, acquiring the former assets of Nine Media's news department.

On June 7, 2024, several news anchors and reporters from CNN Philippines officially announced the launch of NewsWatch Plus, a digital multicasting news service operated by Broadreach Media Holdings. This media investment firm, which owns Nine Media Corporation, took over the assets and operations of CNN Philippines following its closure. NewsWatch Plus was designed as a revival of RPN's flagship newscast, NewsWatch. It was first launched online on July 1, 2024, through the YouTube channel previously branded as CNN Philippines. Its programming block later premiered on August 12, 2024, on Aliw Channel 23.

Several personalities and remaining staff who were not part of its successor outlet either have an undisclosed status or have transferred to different news organizations, such as MediaQuest's news divisions (including News5 whose currently supply most of news and current affairs content for RPTV as part of wider content partnership agreement between TV5 and RPN; and Cignal news channels (One News, One PH, True TV)), ABS-CBN News (which took over the CNN Philippines' role of supplying news content for AMBS' All TV since April 15, 2024), GMA News, RPN's part owner the Government of the Philippines (through Presidential Communications Office (the same network's parent agency)), and Prage's newly launched Bilyonaryo News Channel.

== Awards and citations ==
In April 2016, CNN Philippines earned 6 awards from the Golden Dove Awards hosted by the Kapisanan ng mga Brodkaster ng Pilipinas. Most notably, the Best Newscaster Award went to Mitzi Borromeo, a newsroom anchor. On June 30, 2016, CNN Philippines was recognized as the Television Station of the Year in the Rotary Club of Manila's Journalism Awards.

During the sixth EdukCircle Awards, Pia Hontiveros and Pinky Webb were given a special citation for their work on the vice presidential leg of the PiliPinas Debates 2016.

Two of CNN Philippines' news programs were recognized by the Asian Academy Creative Awards for national categories on October 15, 2020: The Source with Pinky Webb won as Best Current Affairs Programme or Series while The Final Word with Rico Hizon won as Best News Programme in the country.

== Digital television ==
On January 28, 2016, CNN Philippines, through RPN, conducted digital terrestrial television testing using ISDB-T on UHF Channel 19 (503.143 MHz). One year later, in 2017, Nine Media Corporation and RPN acquired a UHF transmitter complex in the Crestview Heights Subdivision of Antipolo, Rizal from Progressive Broadcasting Corporation. It was then used for RPN's DTT broadcasts in Metro Manila and nearby provinces in anticipation of digital television in the Philippines; full implementation was expected for 2026.

== Final programming ==
Some of CNN Philippines programming consists of English and Filipino-language programming, and additional programming produced by RPN and Nine Media.

CNN Philippines broadcast local news and international reports from the CNN U.S. and CNNI reporters pool. Current affairs and lifestyle programs were also aired and produced by different local production outfits. As a part of the deal between CNN and Nine Media Corporation, select programs from CNN U.S. and HLN were also aired, mainly during overnight hours.

=== Simulcasts between CNN Philippines, CNNI and CNN U.S. ===
When warranted, breaking stories and special scheduled events were also broadcast on CNN Philippines via the CNN U.S. or CNNI feed. Notable coverage included the Paris and Brussels terrorist attacks, trapped cave survivors in Thailand, New Year's Eve, select U.S. presidential speeches, and U.S. presidential election coverage.

== Hosts, news anchors, and correspondents ==
=== Final ===
- Pia Hontiveros (CNN Philippines anchor and chief correspondent)
- Pinky Webb (CNN Philippines senior anchor and correspondent)
- Rico Hizon (CNN Philippines senior anchor and director of news content development)
- Andrei Felix
- Christine Jacob-Sandejas
- Paolo Abrera
- Jamie Herrell
- Anthony Pangilinan
- Ruth Cabal
- Mai Rodriguez
- Ria Tanjuatco-Trillo
- Dr. Freddie Gomez
- Menchu Macapagal
- Sam Sadhwani
- Gerg Cahiles
- David Santos
- Anjo Alimario
- AC Nicholls
- Tristan Nodalo
- Eimor Santos
- Xianne Arcanghel
- Rex Remitio
- Pauline Verzosa
- Paige Javier
- Lois Calderon
- Daniza Fernandez
- EJ Gomez
- Currie Cator
- Agatha Gregorio
- Bea Pinlac
- Dale Israel (Cebu correspondent)

=== Former ===
- Patricia Fernandez
- Cherie Mercado
- Amelyn Veloso (deceased 2017)
- Mico Halili
- Charles Tiu
- Gilbert Remulla
- James Deakin
- Rachel Alejandro
- Shamcey Supsup

== See also ==
- List of Radio Philippines Network affiliate stations
