= RJ =

RJ, R&J, or Rj may refer to:

== Arts and entertainment ==
- Romeo and Juliet (disambiguation)
- Radio jockey, a person who hosts a radio talk show
- RJ, a raccoon in the comic strip and feature film Over the Hedge
- R.J. MacReady, the helicopter pilot in the 1982 sci-fi/horror film The Thing
- RJ, an alpaca in the BT21 brand of Line Friends
- R#J, a 2021 American experimental romantic drama film

== Businesses and organizations ==
- R. J. Reynolds Tobacco Company
- Las Vegas Review-Journal, major daily newspaper in Nevada
- Les Brasseurs RJ, a brewery in Québec
- Royal Jordanian airlines, of Jordan (IATA airline designator RJ)

== People ==
=== In arts and entertainment ===
- RJ Jacinto (born 1945), Filipino businessman and musician
- RJ (rapper) (born 1984), American rapper
- RJ Mitte (1992–2026), American actor
- RJ Rosales (1974–2011), Australian-Filipino actor and singer
- R. J. Haddy, special effects artist, contestant on seasons 2 and 5 of the TV series Face Off
- R. J. Helton (born 1981), an American Idol finalist
- Ron Jeremy (born 1953), pornographic actor
- RJ Cyler (born 1995), American actor
- RJ Jimenez (born 1983), Filipino singer and guitarist
- RJ Padilla (born 1989), Filipino former actor and comedian

=== In sport ===
- RJ Barrett (born 2000), Canadian professional basketball player for the Toronto Raptors
- Richard Jefferson (born 1980), former American professional basketball player and ESPN analyst
- Rick Jeanneret (1942-2023), Canadian hockey announcer for the Buffalo Sabres
- Roy Jones Jr. (born 1969), former American boxer
- R. J. Maryland (born 2004), American football player
- R. J. Mickens (born 2001), American football player
- R.J. Oben (born 2001), American football player (son of Roman Oben)

=== In other fields ===
- RJ May (born 1986), American politician
- RJ Mical (born 1956), American inventor and engineer
- RJ Nieto (born 1985), Filipino blogger and option columnist
- RJ Scaringe, American engineer and CEO of Rivian

=== Fictional characters ===
- RJ Tanyag, a character in the Philippine drama series Abot-Kamay na Pangarap
- Romeo and Juliet

== Places ==
- Rio de Janeiro, a Brazilian city
- Rio de Janeiro (state), a state in Brazil
- Rajasthan, a state in India

== Technology and Transportation ==
- Registered jack, a standardized telecommunication network interface
- Regional jet, a 35- to 100-passenger class of short-haul airliner
- Boeing RC-135 Rivet Joint, an American intelligence-gathering aircraft
- RJ (New York City Subway service), a former NYC Subway service, whose route is now served by the J, R, and Z trains.
- RegioJet, a Czech provider of train and bus transport
- Avro RJ, a variant of the British Aerospace 146 regional jet

== Other uses ==
- Reproductive justice, a concept that links reproductive rights with social justice
- Rim job, a sexual act
- The R Journal, a statistical computing periodical (R J. per ISO 4)
- Rajah Broadcasting Network-owned stations in the Philippines:
  - DZRJ-AM
  - DZRJ-FM, known as 100.3 RJ FM
  - DZRJ-DTV, known as RJ DigiTV
