= List of programs previously broadcast by RJTV =

This is a list of programs previously aired by RJTV. For the current shows on RJTV of this network, see List of programs broadcast by RJTV.

== Local defunct shows ==
=== News programs ===
- Insider Exclusive Kapihan (2018–2020; simulcast on DZRJ 810 AM)
- Newsline Citybeat
- Newsline Consumers Front
- RJTV Interactive News with Tony Israel.
- RJ TeleRadio (2019)

=== Public service ===
- Doc Willie and Liza
- HealthLine with Makati Med (2018–2019; simulcast on DZRJ 810 AM)
- Heartbeat Philippines
- Interactive Health
- On Scene: Emergency Response

=== Current affairs ===
- Insight
- Kasangga Mo ang Langit (2019–2022)
- Legally Speaking
- Open House with Gerry Cornejo
- Pag-usapan Natin
- Rapido sa RJTV
- Unbiased (2018–2019)
- What's on TSI?

=== Talk shows ===
- Hearts on Fire
- Jorel Of All Trades
- sportZtackle (hosted by sportscaster Noel Zarate)
- Talk to Harry (now on One Media Network)

=== Travel shows ===
- Biyaheng Langit (2019–2022)
- Only Gemma

=== Variety shows ===
- A Wonderful Evening with Arthur Manuntag
- Acoustic Show with Paul Toledo
- Alternatives
- Bistromania (1993–1994)
- Catch a Rising Star
- Dance Upon A Time with Becky Garcia (1993–1998)
- Executive Lounge with Dale Adriatrico (2006–2007)
- Gimme a Break! (2006–2007)
- Hapi Our (2006–2007)
- Intimate Sessions with Charlie Ysmael (1995)
- Itchy Feet (2019)
- La Salle Night on a Blue Monday (2019)
- Live by Request
- Livewire
- Local Jam
- New Generation
- Party Central
- Pinoy Arts Exposed
- RJ Penthouse (2002–2004)
- Saturday Night Live with Jorel Tan
- Seasons On-Stage
- Wednesday Underground

=== Celebrity talk shows ===
- Jojo A. All the Way (2004–2007)
- The Bill Bailey Show
- The Lynn Sherman Show

=== Youth-oriented shows ===
- Blazin' RnB (2003)
- Kaibigan (2007)
- Livewire (1993)
- Local Jam (1993–1995)
- Saturday Night Live with Jorel Tan (2007)
- Wednesday Underground (2007)

=== Showbiz oriented ===
- Look Who's Talking with Chito Alcid

=== Religious shows ===
- Ang Dating Daan (1994–1998, now aired on UNTV 37: 2004–present)
- Armor of God (2001–2004)
- Oras ng Katotohanan (2001–2007)
- Oras ng Himala (2020–2023)
- Power to Unite with Elvira (2018–2023)

=== Reality shows ===
- New Generation (2005–2007)
- Two Stops Over With Paco Guerrero^{1} (2010–2012)

=== Lifestyle shows ===
- Body and Face by Mendez
- For Sharing
- Home Buddies
- In Her Shoes (2015–2016)^{1}
- Slice of Life with Melissa Gecolea^{1}
- Suzy's Cue with Suzy Guttler (2005)
- You've Been Served with Chef Red^{1}
- Privilege Card (2019)

=== Drama ===
- Sta. Zita At Si Mary Rose (1989; moved to ABS-CBN, 1989–1992)

=== Kids' programs ===
- Junior Jam
- Kiddeo
- Kiddie News
- Worlds of Fun TV Game Show

=== Sports ===
- Pinoy Wrestling (1993–2002)
- Pinoy Wrestling Reloaded (2002–2003)
- Sportzblitz
- Sportztackle

=== Game shows ===
- Spin 2 Win (2006–2008)

=== Infomercials ===
- EZ Shop (2019, 2022–2023)
- Home TV Shopping (1993–1997)
- New Life Shopping TV
- Shop TV (2008–2018)
- The Quantum Channel
- TV Shop Philippines (2018–2023)
- Value Vision (1998–2007)
- Winner TV Shopping (2002–2007)

=== Movie blocks ===
- 3rd Row^{1} (2008–2011)
- Classic Movies (2022–2023)
- Classic Comedy Movies (2021–2022)
- Pinoy Box Office (2006–2007)
- The Screening Room^{1} (2011–2018)
- Sunday Night Movies
- Xclusive Cinema Special

=== Specials ===
- An Atenean Tribute: RJ Bistro's 12th Anniversary Special (July 1998)
- RJ Jams at Glorietta (1997)
- RJ Junior Jam Finals
- Radyo Bandido Strikes Again (1997)
- RJTV 29 Lenten Special: Awit Papuri Sa Panginoon (April 1995)
- RJ Junior Jam New Year Special (December 30, 1995)
- Papuri: The Tiples De Sto. Domingo Christmas Concert TV Special (December 9, 2019)
- Celebreast: The Fight Against Cancer (May 27, 2019)
- 2000 Today (December 31, 1999 – January 1, 2000)
- 34th Bistro RJ Anniversary (TV Special) (July 25, 2020)
- Bibingka, Puto Bumbong, Musika, Atbp.: The RJTV 29 Christmas Special (December 23, 1994)
- RJ Birthday Marathon Jam TV Special (June 5–6, 2020)
- RJ Bistro Christmas Treat (December 23, 2022)
- 2 Shows Back-to-Back Concert Series at RJ Bistro
  - Elvis Night & Disco Dancing: Valentine's Show (February 14, 2022)
  - Tribute Night & Twist Night (March 25, 2022)
  - Elvis vs. Sinatra & Dancing All-Night (April 29, 2022)
  - Dance Fest: RJ's 77th Birthday & Retro Dancing (June 3, 2022)
  - Pavarotti Duets & Dancing All-Night: RJ Bistro's 36th Anniversary (July 25, 2022)
  - Elvis Night & Dancing All-Night (August 17, 2022)
  - Night of the Singing Generals & Dancing All-Night (September 30, 2022)
  - Night of the Singing Ex-Cabinets Members & Dancing All-Night (November 9, 2022)
  - Concert King Meets Rock 'N Roll King (November 29, 2022)
  - Elvis Night: Celebrating Elvis Presley's 88th Birthday & Dancing All-Night (January 18, 2023)
- RJ Guitarman @ 80: The RJ Jacinto 80th Birthday TV Special (June 2025)
- Bistro RJ 40th Anniversary TV Special (July 2026)

== Previously aired programs ==
- 30 Days^{1}
- 9-1-1^{1} (2018)
- Ally McBeal^{1}
- America's Got Talent^{1}
- America's Next Great Restaurant^{1}
- Anything For A Laugh
- Are You There, Chelsea?^{1}
- Arrow^{1} (2016–2018)
- Back in the Game^{1}
- Back to You^{1}
- Better with You^{1}
- Bewitched
- Big Shots^{1}
- Black Work^{1} (2016; rerun, 2018)
- Blindspot^{1} (2016–2018)
- Blow Out^{1}
- Bones^{1} (2016–2017)
- Bono
- Boston Legal^{1}
- Box Office America
- Breathless^{1} (2017)
- Brief Encounters^{1} (2017)
- Building Bryks^{1} (2014)
- Business in a Box
- Californication^{1}
- Case 2 Case
- Celebrity Cooking Showdown^{1}
- Celebrity Says!^{1}
- Chuck's World^{1} (2018)
- Classic Cartoons (1993–2007, 2018–2023)
  - Betty Boop (1930)
  - Cartoon Funnies
  - Crusader Rabbit (1950-1959)
  - Felix the Cat
  - Kissyfur Bear Roots
  - Little Audrey (1947)
  - Looney Tunes
  - Merrie Melodies
  - Mighty Max (1993)
  - Popeye: The Sailor Man (1952)
  - Private Snafu (1943)
  - Superman (1941)
  - The New 3 Stooges (1965-1966)
- Classic Rock
- Coach
- Cold Turkey^{1}
- Crowded^{1}
- Culinary Genius^{1} (2018)
- DC's Legends of Tomorrow^{1} (2017–2018)
- Dateline NBC^{1}
- Deal or No Deal USA^{1}
- Denise Austin's Daily Workout
- Dharma & Greg^{1}
- Diff'rent Strokes
- Dinner: Impossible^{1}
- Dinosaucers
- Doctor Foster^{1} (2017)
- Donut Showdown^{1} (2014)
- Doogie Howser, M.D.^{1}
- Double Exposure^{1}
- Dr. 90210^{1}
- Dr. Phil^{1}
- Dress My Nest^{1}
- Early Today^{1}
- ER^{1}
- Extreme Makeover: Home Edition^{1}
- Extant^{1} (2016–2017)
- Fairy Tales Stories
- Fantastic Four
- Farmer Wants a Wife^{1}
- Father Knows Best
- Golf in Paradise
- Good Morning! How Are You?
- Growing Up Fisher^{1} (2014)
- Hell's Kitchen^{1} (2014–2018)
- Hollywood 101^{1}
- Hot Shots^{1}
- Hot Stuff
- House^{1}
- I Hate My Teenage Daughter^{1}
- I Propose^{1}
- In Plain Sight^{1}
- Inside the Actors Studio^{1}
- Inside Edition^{1} (2008, 2011–2018)
- Italy Unpacked^{1} (2016)
- Jamie's 30-Minute Meals^{1}
- Jamie & Jimmy's Food Fight Club^{1} (2017)
- Jeopardy!^{1}
- Jordskott^{1} (2018)
- Josie and the Pussycats
- Josie and The Pussy Cats in Outer Space
- Kath & Kim^{1}
- Kimora: Life in the Fab Lane^{1}
- Kitchen Nightmares^{1}
- Knife Fight^{1} (2014–2018)
- Kristie's Fill Your House for Free (2015)
- Liar^{1} (2017–2018)
- Life Choices
- Life in Pieces^{1} (2015–2017)
- Lipstick Jungle^{1}
- Live from Abbey Road^{1}
- Living Coffee^{1}
- Love Bites^{1}
- Lovespring International^{1}
- Lucifer^{1} (2017–2018)
- Mad Men^{1}
- Madam Secretary^{1} (2015–2017)
- Malcolm in the Middle^{1}
- Marcel's Quantum Kitchen^{1}
- Married^{1}
- Married... with Children
- Maury^{1}
- May The Best House Win Canada^{1}
- May the Best House Win US^{1}
- Men in Trees^{1}
- Mercy^{1}
- Million Dollar Listing^{1}
- Mister T
- Mixing With The Best^{1}
- Modern Family^{1} (2010–2018)
- Motive^{1} (2018)
- Mr Selfridge^{1} (2018)
- Nanny 911^{1}
- NBC Nightly News^{1}
- Nip/Tuck^{1}
- Notes from the Underbelly^{1}
- Oh Tokyo!
- Odd Mom Out^{1}♥
- Outsourced^{1}
- Prison Break^{1} (2017)
- Pushing Daisies^{1}
- R.A.I.D.
- Reservations Required^{1}
- Restaurant Takeover^{1} (2014, 2016)
- Rita Rocks^{1}
- Royal Pains^{1}
- Satisfaction^{1}
- Saved^{1}
- Saving Grace^{1}
- Sealab 2020
- Sean Saves the World^{1} (2014)
- Sex and the City^{1}
- Shades of Blue^{1} (2016–2018)
- Shazzan
- Showbiz Moms & Dads^{1}
- Side Order of Life^{1}
- Silent Majority^{1}
- Six Feet Under^{1}
- Skating with Celebrities^{1}
- Slot Machine
- Small Wonder^{1}
- Soap
- Star^{1} (2018)
- Stargazer
- Starting Over^{1}
- Still Standing^{1}
- Studio 60 on the Sunset Strip^{1}
- Summerland^{1}
- Super Sports Follies
- Tabloid Wars^{1}
- Tease^{1}
- Thintervention with Jackie Warner^{1}
- Three's Company
- Ticket to Adventure
- The Biggest Loser^{1} (2016–2017)
- The Biggest Loser UK Edition^{1}
- The Chefs' Line^{1} (2018)
- The Crazy Ones^{1}
- The Directors^{1}
- The Facts of Life
- The Funky Phantom
- The Heart Guy^{1} (2018)
- The Insider
- The Jerry Springer Show^{1}
- The L Word^{1}
- The Layover^{1}
- The Lonely Chef
- The Man Called U.N.C.L.E.
- The Middle^{1} (2009–2018)
- The Moment of Truth^{1}
- The Naughty Kitchen with Chef Blythe Beck^{1}
- The New Adventures of Old Christine^{1}
- The Oprah Winfrey Show^{1}
- The Price Is Right^{1}
- The Real Housewives of Atlanta^{1}
- The Real Housewives of New York City^{1}
- The Real Housewives of Orange County^{1}
- The Resident^{1} (2018)
- The Riches^{1}
- The Slap^{1} (2017)
- The Starter Wife^{1}
- The Strain^{1} (2018)
- The Streets of San Francisco
- The Today Show^{1} (2008–2011)
- The Wall Street Journal Report with Maria Bartiromo^{1}
- The Wedding Band^{1}
- The West Wing^{1}
- The Wonder Years^{1}
- This Is Us^{1} (2018)
- Top Chef^{1} (2008–2018)
- Top Chef Masters^{1} (2010–2015)
- The Millionaire Matchmaker^{1} (2018)
- Tori & Dean: Inn Love^{1}
- Trading Spouses^{1}
- Training Day^{1} (2017)
- Trust Me^{1}
- Tyrant^{1} (2018)
- Unan1mous^{1}
- Under Cover
- Video Fashion
- Wacky Races
- Wait Till Your Father Gets Home
- What Would You Do?
- Wheel of Fortune^{1}
- Windfall^{1}
- Winners & Losers^{1} (2014–2017)
- Work Out New York^{1} (2017)

♥ Now moved to ETC
● Now moved to Jack TV
^{1} Acquired through the blocktime agreement with 2nd Avenue

== See also ==
- DZRJ-DTV
- 2nd Avenue
- List of programs broadcast by RJTV
- Rajah Broadcasting Network
- Solar Entertainment Corporation
