= DXRJ-TV =

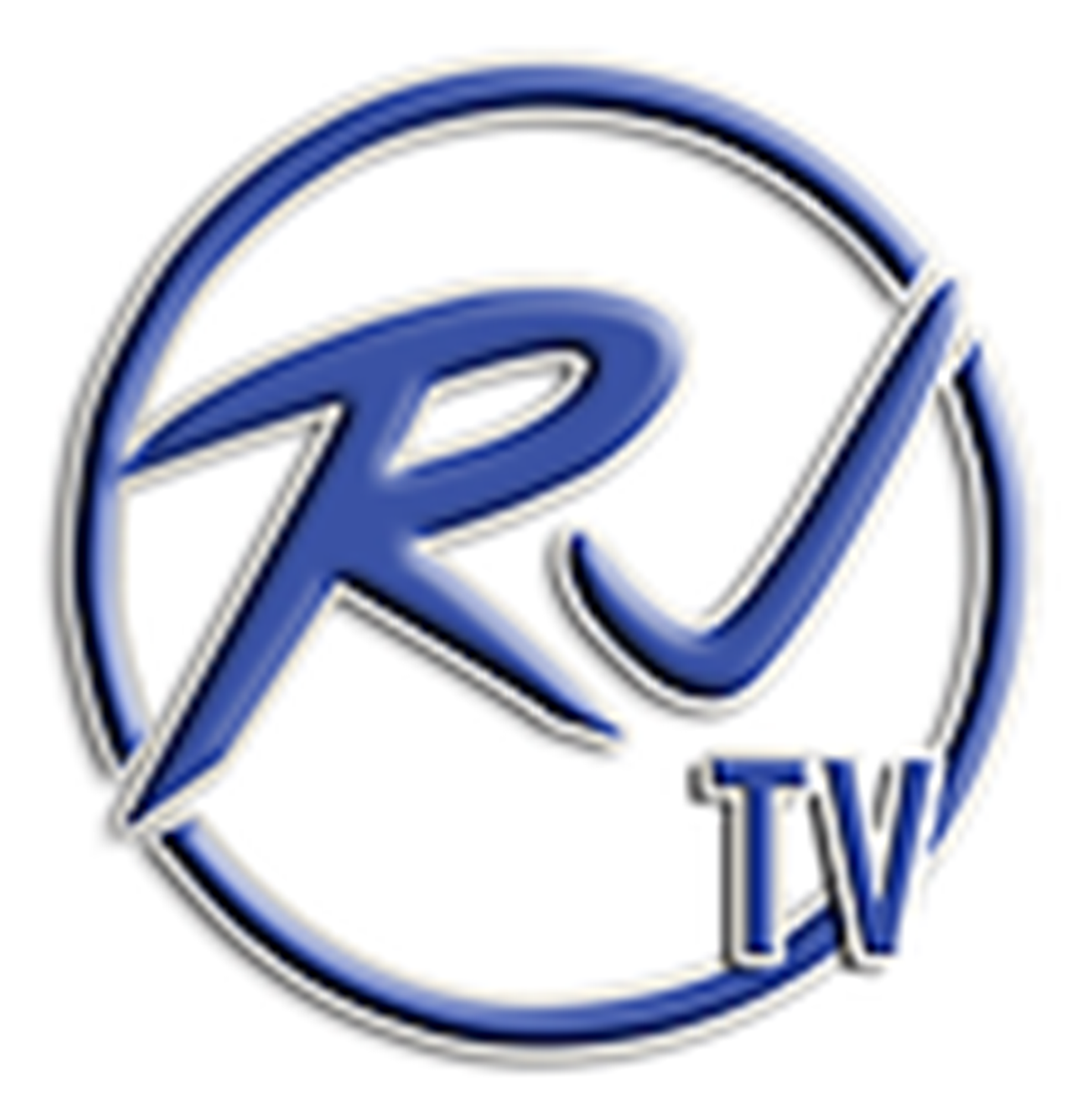
- Cagayan de Oro; Philippines
- City: Cagayan de Oro
- Channels: Analog: 31 (inactive)
- Branding: RJTV-31 Cagayan de Oro

Ownership
- Owner: Rajah Broadcasting Network
- Sister stations: DXRJ-FM

History
- Founded: 1995
- Former affiliations: Solar Entertainment Corporation / 2nd Avenue (2008–2018)
- Call sign meaning: DX; Ramon; Jacinto

Technical information
- Power: 1 kW

Links
- Website: www.RJplanet.com

RJTV Cagayan de Oro (DXRJ-TV) was a free to air television channel in the Philippines, owned and operated by Rajah Broadcasting Network, Inc. owned by Ramon "RJ" Jacinto. The station's studios and transmitters are located at Pryce Plaza Hotel, Carmen Hill, Brgy. Carmen, Cagayan de Oro.

== RJTV Programs ==
Note: Two shows from RJTV continues airing (Thank God It's RJ Live! and RJ Sunday Jam) at 23:00 and 09:00 PHT respectively.

== See also ==
- DZRJ-DTV
- Rajah Broadcasting Network
