= DYRJ-TV =

DYRJ-DTV
Iloilo City; Philippines
- Channels: Digital: 24 (UHF) (ISDB-Tb); Virtual: 24
- Branding: RJTV 24 Iloilo

Programming
- Subchannels: See list
- Affiliations: 24.21: RJTV (Independent); 24.22: Timeless TV; 24.23: Radyo Bandido TV; 24.24: Rock MNL; 24.25: TV Maria; 24.26: RJTV SD6

Ownership
- Owner: Rajah Broadcasting Network
- Sister stations: DYNJ

History
- Founded: 2008
- Former channel numbers: Analog: 46 (UHF) (1996-2008) 24 (UHF) (2008-2018)
- Former affiliations: Solar Entertainment Corporation / 2nd Avenue (2008-2018)
- Call sign meaning: DY; Ramon; Jacinto

Technical information
- ERP: 5 kilowatts

Links
- Website: http://www.rjplanet.com

RJTV 24 Iloilo (DYRJ-DTV) is a UHF, free-to-air television channel in the Philippines owned and operated by Rajah Broadcasting Network, Inc. RJTV 29 broadcasts from the BOC Bldg., Mapa Street, Iloilo City.

== RJTV programs ==
Note: Two shows from RJTV continue airing (Thank God It's RJ Live! and RJ Sunday Jam) at 23:00 and 09:00 PHT, respectively.

== Technical information ==
=== Digital channels ===
DYRJ-TV operates on UHF Channel 24 (533.143 MHz) and is multiplexed into the following subchannels:

Subchannels of DYRJ-DTV
Channel	Video	Aspect	Short name	Programming	Note
24.21	480i	16:9	RJ DigiTV	Main DYRJ-TV programming/RJ DigiTV	Fully migrated from analog to digital (Still under test broadcast)
24.22	480i	16:9	Timeless TV	Timeless TV	Fully migrated from analog to digital (Still under test broadcast)
24.23	480i	4:3	Radyo Bandido TV	Radyo Bandido TV	Fully migrated from analog to digital (Still under test broadcast)
24.24	480i	16:9	Rock of Manila TV	RJTV Rock	Fully migrated from analog to digital (Still under test broadcast)
24.25	480i	16:9	TV Maria	TV Maria	Fully migrated from analog to digital (Still under test broadcast)

== See also ==
- DZRJ-DTV
- Rajah Broadcasting Network
