= List of programs broadcast by RJTV =

This is a list of programs broadcast by RJDigiTV 29, a UHF digital independent TV station owned by Rajah Broadcasting Network. It was known as 2nd Avenue from 2008 to 2018, before it reverted to its own programming.

== Current programming ==
=== Music ===
- Bravo Executive Lounge (2019)
- Let's Groove with Roaring 20's Band (2021)
- RJ Sunday Jam (2003; simulcast on RJ 100.3 and DZRJ 810 AM)
- Thank God it's RJ (2002)
- The Drive Time Show (2018; simulcast on RJ 100.3)

=== Talk ===
- The Medyo Late Night Show with Jojo A. (2004–2007, 2020, 2023)

=== Lifestyle ===
- All About Dogs with Jamie (2026)

=== Archival programming ===
- Choice Concerts (2021)
- RJ Video Vault (2018)

== See also ==
- Rajah Broadcasting Network
