= DZRJ =

DZRJ is the callsign of Rajah Broadcasting Network's three flagship stations in Metro Manila:

- DZRJ-AM, branded as Radyo Bandido
- DZRJ-FM, branded as RJFM
- DZRJ-TV, branded as RJTV
