= DYRJ =

DYRJ may refer to:

- DYRJ-FM, an FM station broadcasting in Cebu City, branded as RJFM
- DYRJ-TV, a television station broadcasting in Iloilo City, branded as RJTV
