= DXRJ =

DXRJ may refer to:

- DXRJ-AM, a defunct AM station in Iligan
- DXRJ-FM, an FM station broadcasting in Cagayan De Oro
