= Biyaheng Langit (TV program) =

2000 Philippine television documentary show

- Genre: Current Affairs Program
- Created by: Heavenly Images Productions for Television, Inc.
- Developed by: RPN News and Public Affairs (2000–07); IBC News and Public Affairs (2007–13); PTV (2013–19); RJTV (2019–22); Bilyonaryo News Channel (since 2025; as a segment of Kasangga Mo ang Langit)
- Presented by: Rey Langit (2000–present); Reyster Langit (2000–05); Sarah Balabagan (2000–03); JR Langit (2005–present)
- Theme music composer: Allan Feliciano
- Opening theme: "Biyaheng Langit" by Cecilia "Chi" Datu-Bocobo
- Composers: Allan Feliciano, Cecilia "Chi" Datu-Bocobo
- Country of origin: Philippines
- Original language: Filipino

Production
- Editor: Sam Creencia
- Running time: 1 hour (2000–03); 30 Minutes (2004–08, 2019–22); 15 minutes (2009–present; on a sporadic basis since 2025)

Original release
- Network: RPN (2000–07); IBC (2007–13); PTV (2013–19); RJTV (2019–22); Bilyonaryo News Channel (since 2025)
- Release: April 8, 2000 – present

Related
- Kasangga Mo ang Langit

Biyaheng Langit (transl. The Heavenly Voyage) is a Philippine television travel documentary show broadcast by RPN, IBC, PTV and RJTV. Originally hosted by Rey Langit, Reyster Langit and Sarah Balabagan, it aired on RPN from April 8, 2000 to March 10, 2007. The show moved to IBC from January 5, 2008 to September 13, 2013, PTV from September 18, 2013 to August 30, 2019 and RJTV from September 7, 2019 to October 22, 2022, and on Bilyonaryo News Channel since March 15, 2025, as a sporadic segment of Kasangga Mo Ang Langit. Langit and JR Langit serve as the current hosts.

The show has been hosted by Rey Langit following his failed senatorial bid in the 1998 Presidential Elections through the Partido para sa Demokratikong Reporma–Lapiang Manggagawa (Reporma–LM). His first co-hosts were the late Reyster Langit, who died of heart failure due to cerebral malaria, a disease he contracted in Palawan while he was on assignment, and Sarah Balabagan, who was known for her trial in the United Arab Emirates. They were replaced by Reyster's younger brother, Reynante "JR" Langit, Jr.

== History ==
Biyaheng Langit was first aired on RPN from April 8, 2000 to March 10, 2007. Rey Langit, who had an unsuccessful senatorial bid in the 1998 Presidential Elections through the Partido para sa Demokratikong Reporma–Lapiang Manggagawa (Reporma–LM) two years ago, was joined by his late son Reyster Langit and partner Sarah Balabagan.

On June 2, 2005 Reyster died of heart failure due to cerebral malaria, a disease he contracted while on assignment in Palawan for Kasangga Mo ang Langit. Reyster wrote a letter to his family

“I have seen the value of helping others. I believe that the most rewarding part of my job as a broadcaster is not exposing the wrongdoings of others, but the smile and acknowledgment we get people whose lives we have touched and changed in some wonderful way.”

Following his death, Rey's surviving son, JR, has since joined him not only for Biyaheng Langit but also for Kasangga Mo ang Langit.

The show moved to IBC from January 5, 2008 to September 13, 2013 and later moved to PTV from September 18, 2013 to August 31, 2019 and later moved to RJTV from September 7, 2019 to October 22, 2022.

On February 12, 2022 Rey Langit bid farewell to the show to run for senator. and his friend former Ulat Bayan anchor Erwin Tulfo to run for Partylist Following that, JR Langit remained as a sole host and continued his role until 2022. By that time, it was reformatted as a magazine show.

== Hosts ==
Main hosts

- Rey Langit (2000–present)
- JR Langit (2005–present)

Former hosts

- Reyster Langit+ (2000–05)
- Sarah Balabagan (2000–03)

== See also ==
- List of programs previously broadcast by Radio Philippines Network
- List of programs broadcast by People's Television Network
- List of programs previously broadcast by RJTV
