= Kasangga Mo ang Langit =

1998 Philippine television documentary show

- Genre: Current Affairs Program
- Created by: Heavenly Images Productions for Television, Inc.
- Developed by: IBC News and Public Affairs (1998-2000, 2007–2013); RPN News and Public Affairs (2000–2007); PTV (2013–2019); RJTV (2019–2022); Bilyonaryo News Channel (since 2025)
- Presented by: Rey Langit (1998–present); Reyster Langit (1998–2005); JR Langit (2005–present)
- Opening theme: "Kasangga Mo ang Langit" by Michael Laygo
- Ending theme: "Kasangga Mo ang Langit" by Ronilo Victoriano
- Country of origin: Philippines
- Original language: Tagalog

Production
- Editor: Sam Creencia
- Running time: 1 hour (1998–2001); 30 minutes (2001–2008, 2019–present); 15 minutes (2009–2019)

Original release
- Network: IBC (1998-2000, 2007–2013); RPN (2000–2007); PTV (2013–2019); RJTV (2019–2022); Bilyonaryo News Channel (since 2025)
- Release: July 18, 1998 – present

Related
- Biyaheng Langit

Kasangga Mo ang Langit
- Genre: public affairs, news analysis, commentary
- Country of origin: Philippines
- Language: Tagalog
- Home station: DWIZ (1998-2016); DZRJ (2016-2019); DZEC (2022–2025); DWAR 1494 Abante (since 2025)
- Hosted by: Rey Langit (1998–present); Reyster Langit (1998–2005); JR Langit (2005–present)
- Created by: Heavenly Images Productions for Television, Inc.
- Original release: 1998 – present

Kasangga Mo ang Langit (transl. You're Up Against the Sky) is a Philippine television documentary show broadcast by RPN, IBC, PTV, RJTV and Bilyonaryo News Channel. Originally hosted by Rey Langit and Reyster Langit, it aired on IBC from July 18, 1998 to 2000. The show moved to RPN from April 7, 2000 to March 8, 2007, IBC from January 5, 2008, to September 13, 2013, PTV from September 18, 2013, to August 30, 2019, RJTV from September 7, 2019, to October 22, 2022 and Bilyonaryo News Channel since March 15, 2025. Rey Langit and JR Langit currently serve as the hosts.

In addition to the television program, a radio version of Kasangga Mo ang Langit has also been hosted by Rey Langit and JR Langit. It originally aired on DWIZ before moving to DZRJ Radyo Bandido from 2017 until October 2022. The show then transitioned to DZEC Radyo Agila from December 2022 to February 2025 and currently airs on DWAR 1494 Abante as of March 3, 2025.

Rey Langit launched the program after his unsuccessful senatorial bid in the 1998 Presidential Elections under the Partido ng Demokratikong Reporma–Lapiang Manggagawa (Reporma–LM). His first co-host was his son, the late Reyster Langit, who died due to heart failure caused by cerebral malaria, which he contracted while on assignment in Palawan. Following Reyster’s passing, his brother, Reynante "JR" Langit, Jr., took over as co-host.

== History ==
Kasangga Mo ang Langit premiered on IBC from July 18, 1998 to 2000, then moved to RPN from April 7, 2000 to March 10, 2007, with Rey Langit and his son, Reyster Langit, as hosts. Rey, who had previously run for senator in the 1998 elections under the Partido ng Demokratikong Reporma–Lapiang Manggagawa (Reporma–LM), co-hosted the show with Reyster until the latter's passing in 2005.

On June 2, 2005, Reyster Langit died at age 32 from heart failure due to cerebral malaria, which he contracted while on assignment in Palawan. Before his passing, he wrote a heartfelt message to his family about the value of helping others through journalism. He was laid to rest at Manila Memorial Park in Parañaque.

Following Reyster’s death, his brother, JR Langit, joined their father as co-host on both Kasangga Mo ang Langit and Biyaheng Langit. The show later moved networks multiple times: to IBC (2008–2013), PTV (2013–2019), and RJTV (2019–2022).

On February 12, 2022, Rey Langit stepped down to run for senator, leaving JR as the sole host until the first incarnation of the show concluded later that year. By then, it had transitioned into a magazine-style program, with elements carried over into its radio edition, which continued airing with taped episodes streamed on social media.

On March 15, 2025, Kasangga Mo ang Langit relaunched as a standalone TV program on the Bilyonaryo News Channel. This came after the show's daily radio edition moved from Radyo Agila to Abante Radyo on March 3, 2025.

== Hosts ==
Main hosts

- Rey Langit (1998–2010, 2010–16, 2016–22, 2022–present)
- JR Langit (2005–present)

Former hosts

- Reyster Langit† (1998–2005)
- Alex Santos (substitute host for Langit; 2022–25, Radyo Agila)

== See also ==
- List of programs previously broadcast by Radio Philippines Network
- List of programs broadcast by People's Television Network
- List of programs broadcast by RJTV
