= RJFM Tuguegarao =

Radio station in Tuguegarao, Philippines

RJFM Tuguegarao (DWRJ)
Simulcast of DZRJ-FM Manila
- Tuguegarao; Philippines
- Broadcast area: Cagayan and surrounding areas
- Frequency: 96.5 MHz
- Branding: 100.3 RJFM

Programming
- Language: English
- Format: Adult Hits

Ownership
- Owner: Rajah Broadcasting Network; (Free Air Broadcasting Network, Inc.)

History
- First air date: 1987
- Call sign meaning: Ramon Jacinto

Technical information
- Licensing authority: NTC
- Power: 5,000 watts
- ERP: 5,000 watts

Links
- Website: www.RJplanet.com

DWRJ (96.5 FM) is a relay station of RJFM Manila, owned and operated by Rajah Broadcasting Network through its licensee Free Air Broadcasting Network, Inc. The station's transmitter is located at Tuguegarao City.
