= Ang Padrino =

1984 action film by Ronwaldo Reyes

- Theatrical Poster
- Directed by: Ronwaldo Reyes
- Screenplay by: Eddie Romero; Fred Navarro; Ronwaldo Reyes
- Produced by: FPJ
- Starring: Fernando Poe Jr.
- Cinematography: Ver Reyes
- Edited by: Augusto Salvador
- Music by: Ernani Cuenco
- Production company: FPJ Productions
- Distributed by: FPJ Productions
- Release date: December 6, 1984
- Running time: 140 minutes
- Country: Philippines
- Language: Filipino

Ang Padrino (transl. The Godfather) is a 1984 Philippine action film co-written, produced, and directed by Fernando Poe Jr. The film also stars Poe as the titular Padrino, a local adaptation of the film, The Godfather. The film is notable for the casting of radio personality, Rey Langit (of Kasangga Mo ang Langit fame) as an antagonist in the film.

== Cast and characters ==
- Fernando Poe Jr. as Emong Sanchez
- Coney Reyes as Chayong Sanchez
- Fred Montilla as Atty. Dela Costa
- Rey Langit as Hitman
- Johnny Delgado as Jimmy
- Lito Anzures as Sgt. Quintiliano
- Ruel Vernal as Pepeng Tambak
- Lucita Soriano Lita Quintiliano
- Zandro Zamora as Tony Sanchez
- Rez Cortez as Jake
- Ricky Davao as Alex dela Costa
- Allan Bautista as Frankie
- Alex Leviste as Totoy
- Amay Bisaya as Donggay
- Gigi dela Riva as Selina
- Max Alvarado as Tasyo
- Daria Ramirez as Alice
- Larry Silva as Hilarion
- Cesar Montano as Noring
- Rosemary Sarita as Lilia
- Mario Taguiwalo as Pidyong
- Tina Loy
- Joaquin Fajardo
- King Gutierrez
- Rene Hawkins
- Nonoy de Guzman
- Boy Bañez
- Belo Borja
- Nenette Cellona
- Ernie David
- Bebot Davao
- Bert Garon
- Eddie Gicoso
- Pons de Guzman
- Romy Guarin
- Eddie del Mar
- Michael Murray
- Robert Rivera
- Er Canton Salazar
- Angie Salinas
- Naty Santiago
- Eddie Samonte
- Eddie Tuazon
- Angelo Ventura

== Accolades ==
Award-Giving Body	Category	Recipient	Result
1985 FAMAS Awards
1985 FAMAS Awards	Best Picture	Ang Padrino	Won
1985 FAMAS Awards	Best Director	Ronwaldo Reyes	Won
1985 FAMAS Awards	Best Screenplay	Eddie Romero, Fred Navarro and Ronwaldo Reyes	Won
1985 FAMAS Awards	Best Actress	Coney Reyes	Nominated
1985 FAMAS Awards	Best Supporting Actor	Zandro Zamora	Nominated
