= DYRJ-FM =

Radio station in Cebu City, Philippines

RJFM Cebu (DYRJ)
Simulcast of DZRJ-FM Manila
- Cebu City; Philippines
- Broadcast area: Metro Cebu and surrounding areas
- Frequency: 100.3 MHz
- RDS: RJFMCebu
- Branding: 100.3 RJFM

Programming
- Language: English
- Format: Adult hits
- Affiliations: BBC World Service; Voice of America

Ownership
- Owner: Rajah Broadcasting Network; (Free Air Broadcasting Network, Inc.)

History
- First air date: 1987
- Call sign meaning: Ramon Jacinto, founder, Rajah Broadcasting Network

Technical information
- Licensing authority: NTC
- Power: 20,000 watts
- ERP: 42,000 watts

DYRJ (100.3 FM) is a relay station of RJFM Manila, owned and operated by Rajah Broadcasting Network through its licensee Free Air Broadcasting Network, Inc. The station's relay transmitter is located at the 10th Floor, Ludo and Luym Building, Plaridel Street, Cebu City.

== History ==
The station was established in 1987 as RJFM. At that time, it aired an album rock format, similar to its former AM station in Manila. In 1996, it changed its name to Boss Radio. In 2000, it rebranded as The Hive and switched to a modern rock format. In 2003, it became a relay station of RJ 100.3 with limited local advertising.

On December 16, 2021, the station went off the air after its building and transmitter at Ludo and Luym Building were destroyed by Typhoon Rai (Odette), together with 106.7 Home Radio's transmitter site and 107.5 Win Radio. Its transmitter tower was struck by the said typhoon. In February 2022, it went back on the air after the power was restored in the building.
