= 51st International Eucharistic Congress =

International-Eucharistic gathering in Cebu

2016 International Eucharistic Congress
- Official logo
- Date: January 24–31, 2016
- Venue: International Eucharistic Congress Pavilion
- Location: Cebu City, Philippines
- Theme: Christ in you, our hope of glory (Co 1:27)
- Organised by: Archdiocese of Cebu; Cebu City Government
- Participants: 15,000 (registered candidates), 2,000,000+ (public attendees)
- Papal legate: Cardinal Charles Maung Bo (Myanmar)
- Website: iec2016.ph

The 2016 International Eucharistic Congress was the 51st edition of the International Eucharistic Congress (IEC) which took place from January 24–31, 2016 in Cebu City, Philippines. A convention center, the International Eucharistic Congress Pavilion, was constructed for this occasion. Pope Francis sent Cardinal Charles Maung Bo of Myanmar as his papal legate and presider at the opening Mass on January 24.

This was the second time that the Philippines hosted the International Eucharistic Congress, with the first one held in Manila on February 3–7, 1937.

== Preparations ==
The Cebu City Traffic Office ran traffic dry-runs days before the event to ensure that the traffic situation during the event would be manageable. Several roads were closed and others open to public vehicles only.

Catholic Schools and selected public schools in Cebu, including universities, suspended classes during the IEC week.

The Philippine National Police's Regional Office 7 ensured safety and security for the event and its ad hoc task group on the IEC and Sinulog requested additional support from Camp Crame, including the Explosives Ordnance Division and bomb-sniffing dog squad of the Philippine military.

== Marketing ==
=== Mobile app ===
The IEC2016 Guide was developed by InnoPub Media as the official mobile app for the event which included information for the event such as schedules, speakers, basic theological text, news and updates, and linked to the official livestream feed of the event. It also included information on tourism sites within Metro Cebu, particularly religious heritage sites such as churches.

=== Logo ===
The logo used for the 2016 International Eucharistic Congress was derived from a logo design competition. The winning design was made by Jayson Jaluag, a 19-year-old fine arts student from Mandaue.

The Sun signifies the hope of glory and a new beginning. It also emphasizes the host country whose flag has the sun as one of its primary elements. The seven rays of the sun represent the seven gifts of the Holy Spirit. The chalice and bread signify the sacredness of the Eucharist. The "IHS" monogram which stands for (Iesus Hominum Salvator) symbolize the Holy Name of Jesus and represents the host city of Cebu whose former name was Villa del Santissimo Nombre de Jesus.

The missionary nature of the Catholic Church is symbolized by the stylized boat. The three people on the boat in different colors portrays the principles which influence the faith of Filipinos: green for hope, blue for faith itself, and red for charity. The boat's aqua blue color represents the Christian pilgrimage to Heaven.

=== Theme ===
The theme for event revolved around hope and was derived from a Biblical verse: "Christ in you, our hope and glory" (Col. 1:27).

== Venues ==
The International Eucharistic Congress (IEC) Pavilion (renamed as IC3 Convention Center after the event), built by Duros Development Corporation, served the primary venue of the Congress.

== Events ==
=== Theological Symposium ===
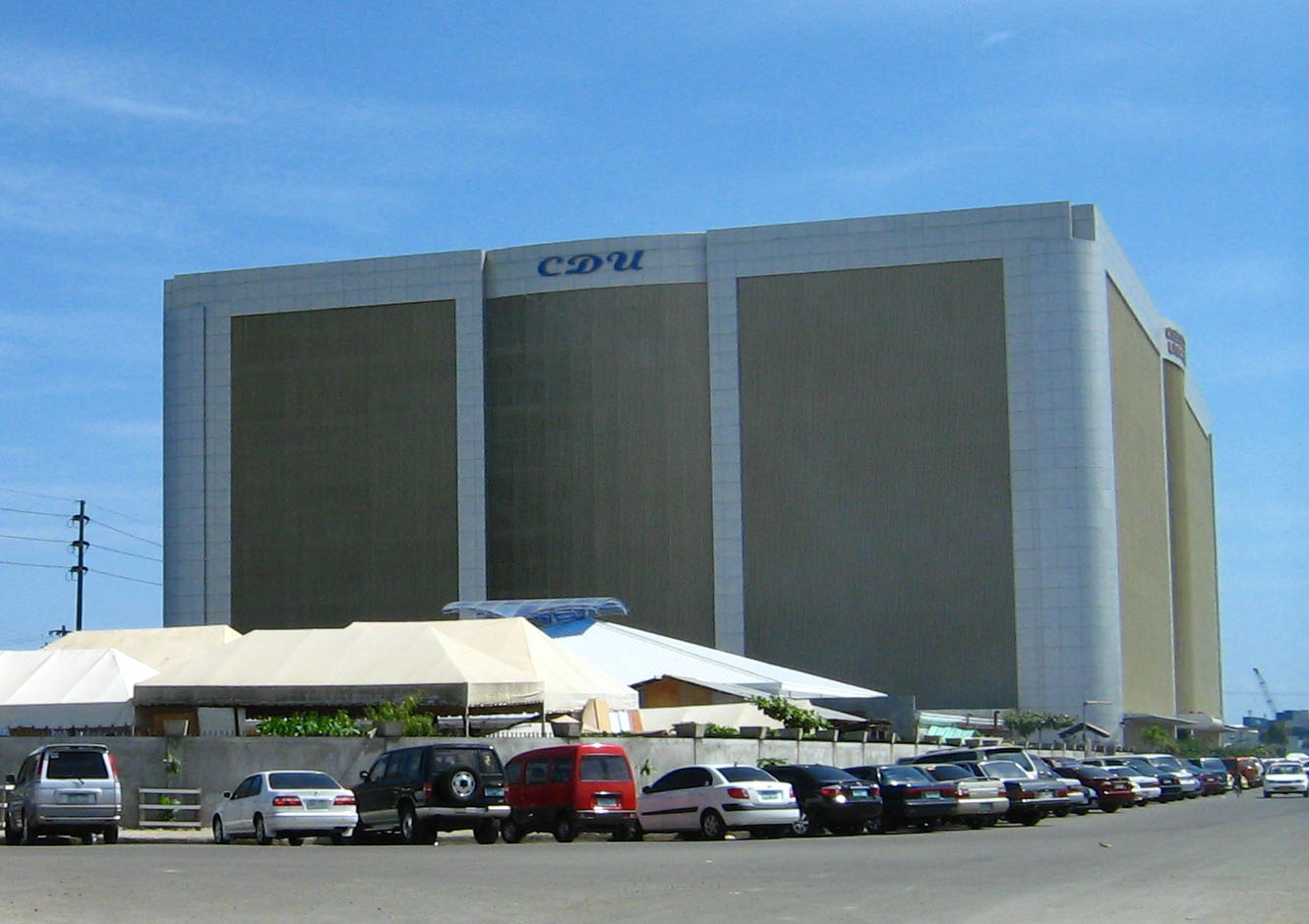
The Cebu Doctors' University in Mandaue was the venue of the Theological Symposium

From January 20–22, a symposium was held at the Cebu Doctors' University in Mandaue, Cebu where the Eucharist among other topics were discussed. Members of the clergy and theologians attended the symposium. 1,800 people attended on the first day.

Among the speakers and workshop facilitators that led the event were:

- Timothy Radcliffe (United Kingdom) discussed the virtue of hope. He spoke of a "crisis of hope" caused by the rise of terrorism (especially in the context of Al-Qaeda and the September 11 terrorist attacks). He described hope as "not just intellectual curiosity" but also as "existential".
- Francis Moloney (Australia), a Salesian priest, author and editor, discussed the passage from the Gospel of John, “He loved them to the end”, and gave a narrative on the Eucharist's institution.
- Mark Francis (United States), President of Catholic Theological Union in Chicago, discussed the topic of liturgy and inculturation.
- Piero Marini (Italy), president of the Pontifical Committee for International Eucharistic Congresses and a papal master of ceremonies for 20 years, spoke in Italian on La storia del nuovo "Ordo Missae" (The history of the new Order of Mass).
- Thomas Rosica (Canada), columnist for a Catholic media network, spoke on the topic, “Evangelizing the secular world”.
- Josefina Manabat (Philippines), the sole woman speaker and dean of the graduate school of San Beda College, Manila, discussed “Catechesis on the Sunday Eucharist”.

=== Congress proper ===
January 24

The Congress started on January 24 with a Solemn Mass in the Plaza Independencia led by Cardinal Charles Maung Bo. The Police Regional Office 7 estimates that the Mass was attended by at least 350,000 people.

January 26

Cardinal Bo along with other church officials visited the Cebu Provincial Detention and Rehabilitation Center. Bo was joined by Cebu Archbishop José S. Palma and the papal legate's protocol officer Fr. Jan Limchua. They witnessed the CPDRC Dancing Inmates performing the theme of the Congress and interacted with the inmates after the performance.

January 28

Don Bosco Youth Center (DBYC) in Barangay Pasil, Cebu City, was visited by Cardinal Bo, himself a Salesians of Don Bosco. The DBYC performed a traditional Sinulog dance for the visiting cardinal. Bo had visited a slum area prior to his visit to the youth center. At his speech before students of the youth center, he urged the youth to pursue their vocations, never give up, and never blame others, themselves, or their situations as an excuse to remain idle.

January 29

In the morning at the IEC Pavilion, Cardinals John Onaiyekan of Nigeria and Oswald Gracias of India spoke on the Eucharist.

At the meet attended by 15,000 people, Onaiyekan criticized discrimination in the Church which he called a form of "apartheid" and he urged that the IEC should be open to people regardless of social standing. He also criticized the government of Saudi Arabia and ISIS for the practice of crucifixion, the former for using it for capital punishment and the latter for using it against Christians in disrespect for the sacredness of the symbol of the cross. He noted the violent response to the alleged disrespect of the Quran, while urging people to respect the religious symbols of people of other faiths. He also criticized the satirical French magazine Charlie Hebdo. Onaiyekan said that despite all this, "the cross still remains the symbol of the victory of the Lord Jesus,”

The second Mass of the IEC was held at 4:00 pm local time. A grand procession was held after the Mass with a custom-made, gold-plated brass monstrance on a float accompanying devotees.

January 30

As one of the highlights of the Congress, Cebu Archbishop Emeritus Ricardo Vidal administered first communion to 5,000 children, some of them street children.

January 31

The Congress concluded with the Statio Orbis or closing Mass. It was expected that millions were to attend the event. Pope Francis announced the next International Eucharistic Congress would be held in 2020 in Budapest, Hungary.

== Media coverage ==
The 2016 edition marked the first time that the congress had a global satellite broadcast. It was planned that the coverage of the event would be similar to that of Pope Francis's visit to the Philippines in January 2015.

The IEC Channel featured 12 hours of programming which covered all major events of the IEC, live and tape-delay broadcasts. RTVM was responsible for running the control room. The People's Television Network was responsible for the outdoor coverage.

The Cebu IEC produced the first daily print of the CBCP Monitor covering the proceedings and other relevant stories about the Eucharistic Congress. CBCP News and Areopagus Communications produced handled the special coverage.

With assistance from the Supreme Office of the Knights of Columbus, the main satellite uplink was provided by Apstar Global which enabled the broadcasting of the IEC to as far as Italy and the United States. PLDT provided a bandwidth of 1 GB to the TOC. Cignal TV broadcast the IEC in two of its channels; standard definition on Channel 99 and high definition for Channel 199. TV Maria and the Cebu Catholic Television Network also broadcast the IEC.

The EWTN Global Catholic Network which had a reach of 144 countries, RAI of Italy, and Centro Televisivo Vaticano covered the event, as well as Radyo Veritas in Luzon and DYRF for Visayas and Mindanao, besides the stations of the Catholic Media Network.
