= DYNB =

DYNB may refer to:

- DYNB-TV, a relay television station owned by Nation Broadcasting Corporation, Philippines
- Radyo Kaabyanan (DYNB), a low-powered Nutriskwela Community Radio station from Sibalom, Philippines
- Dynamic apnea with bifins, a freediving discipline
