= DXRJ-AM =

Radio station in Iligan, Philippines

DXRJ
Iligan; Philippines
- Broadcast area: Lanao del Norte, Lanao del Sur, parts of Misamis Oriental
- Frequency: 1476 kHz

Programming
- Format: Silent

Ownership
- Owner: Rajah Broadcasting Network; (Free Air Broadcasting Network, Inc.)

History
- First air date: 1986
- Last air date: 2013
- Call sign meaning: Ramon Jacinto

Technical information
- Licensing authority: NTC

DXRJ (1476 AM) was a radio station owned and operated by Rajah Broadcasting Network through its licensee Free Air Broadcasting Network, Inc. Its studio and transmitter were located along National Highway, Brgy. Santa Filomena, Iligan City. It aired Voice of America during late nights throughout its existence.
