= Family Rosary Crusade (TV program) =

Filipino Catholic TV program

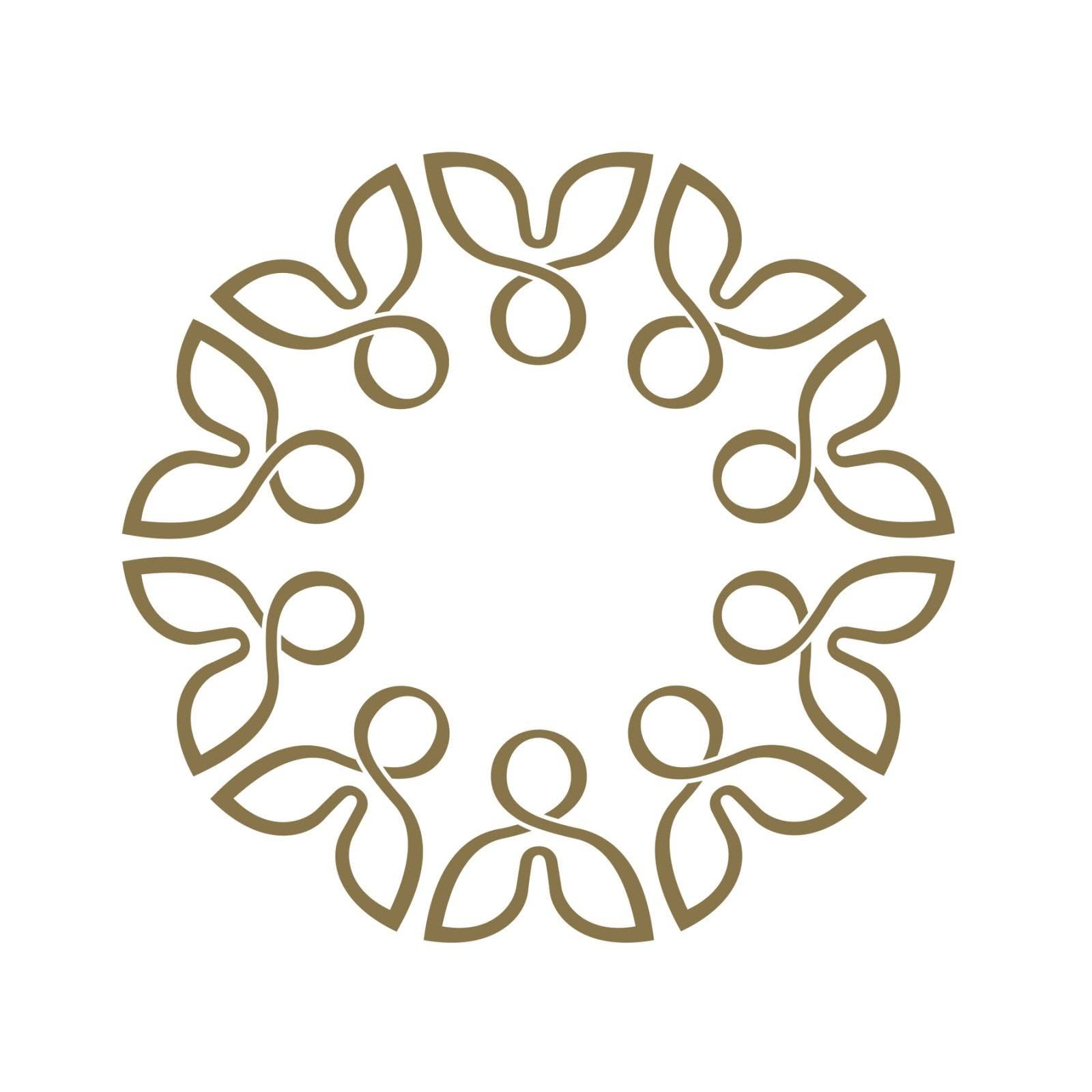
- "The family that prays together stays together"
- Genre: Religious broadcasting
- Created by: Patrick Peyton, CSC
- Starring: Fr. Allan Samonte; Bernard Factor Cañaberal; Claudine Zialcita
- Country of origin: Philippines
- Original languages: Filipino; English

Production
- Running time: 1 hour

Original release
- Network: National: ABS-CBN (1987–2003); Studio 23 (1996–2014); S+A (2014–2018); RPN (1987–2007); PTV (formerly NBN) (1987–2014); ABC/TV5 (1992–2008); Regional: CCTN; TV Maria
- Release: March 7, 1987 – November 18, 2018

The Family Rosary Crusade is a multi-media based ministry in the Philippines. In the 1950s, Patrick Peyton, CSC came to the Philippines upon the invitation of the Dominican Fathers, or Order of Preachers, to conduct and speak on his worldwide efforts to promote the praying of the Family Rosary all over the world. Peyton was warmly welcomed in the Philippines and his mission has grown and expanded all over the country. Peyton died in 1992, but his mission in the Philippines continues to date with programs airing in various radio and television networks.

== History ==
=== Distant collaborations ===
The promotion of the Family Rosary through the use of mass media was intensely pursued by Peyton in the United States in the late 1940s, viewed by many as an important step of healing families whose loved ones were lost in the intense fighting during the Second World War. In 1947, Peyton with the volunteer help from several Hollywood actors, aired dramatizations of family life centered on praying the Rosary on the United States radio network, Mutual Broadcasting System.

In 1947, a Jesuit priest, James B. Reuter, SJ who was in the United States submitted a radio drama play to Peyton that was used on the Family Theater programs that was aired on Mutual Broadcasting System. Reuter, a priest who was assigned to the Philippines before the Second World War, was among those severely treated while in Japanese prison camp returned to Manila in 1948.

Reuter launched a Philippine version of the Family Theater on radio station KZPI (now known as DWIZ) with well-known Filipino actors and actresses voicing the radio drama scripts that Peyton used in the United States. The program aired every Sunday evening.

With the advent of television in the Philippines, Family Theater broadcast were among the first programs that aired on the country's first television station, DZAQ owned by the Alto Broadcasting System, co-owned by a retired American war veteran communications engineer James Lindenberg and Antonio Quirino, brother of the incumbent Philippine president of that time, Elpidio Quirino.

Peyton first got to visit the Philippines in 1953, a few years since his mission was introduced to the Philippines by Reuter. By then, his efforts to promote the praying of the Family Rosary had started to take roots in the Philippines and by the time he started some of his famous Rosary rallies in the country, Peyton was already a household name in radio and television.

In the 1960s, Eugenio Lopez's Chronicle Broadcasting Network (CBN) acquired Alto Broadcasting System to establish what would be the most important television network in the Philippines all throughout the 1960s. ABS-CBN brought in Family Theater into its prime time programming in the 1960s.

Filipino actors and actresses including unknown ones who would later become entertainment icons worked with Reuter's Family Theater productions for free. At first Family Theater was airing for free on Channel 3 (later Channel 2 in 1969) of ABS-CBN but later the group was asked to bring advertising into the network, and when the call was made, people continued to donate to keep the program airing.

Filipino named celebrities Vic Diaz, Celia Diaz-Laurel, Barbara Perez, Vic Silayan, Pancho Magalona, Tita Duran, Jaime Zobel de Ayala, Zenaida Amador, Baby Barredo, Noel Trinidad, Subas Herrero, Robert Arevalo, Cristina Ponce-Enrile, Patsy Monzon were among those who appeared on Family Theater. Jaime Zobel de Ayala later became chairman of a Filipino banking, real estate and telecommunications holding company, Ayala group. Zeneida Amador and Baby Barredo later established the country's highly respected theater group, Repertory Philippines.

=== The Blanket of Darkness ===
Scene from Family Theater in the Philippines with a young Filipino business industrialist Jaime Zobel de Ayala as lead actor.

In 1972, then-President Ferdinand Marcos declared martial law and all forms of media were silenced. ABS-CBN was shut down under the Marcos regime and all Family Theater programs both on television and radio ceased to broadcast.

On December 8, 1985, Peyton led a very successful Marian Rally at Rizal Park. Amidst the political turmoil affecting the country at that time, the call to prayer and world peace brought more than a million Filipinos before the Quirino Grandstand. The rally, with the support of Cardinal Jaime Sin, consecrated the Philippines to the Immaculate Heart of Mary.

In 1985, months before the Marian Rally, Peyton sought permission to promote the scheduled rally on various media outlets in the Philippines who were all subject to censorship or were under the control of Marcos cronies. Peyton finally appeared on the government television station, Maharlika Broadcasting System Channel 4, for a series of talks on the Marian Rally and the importance of prayers. This television appearance later resulted in the newer incarnation of Peyton's mission in Philippine broadcast history a year later.

With the peaceful overthrow of Marcos in 1986, and with a new president, Corazon Aquino leading a nation in praying the Rosary, Peyton's mission started to bloom again in the Philippines. When ABS-CBN reopened after six months, Reuter revived Family Theater under a new title, Ang Pamilya Ko, [My Family] but it would only run on ABS-CBN for thirteen weeks until it was canceled.

=== From drama to magazine talk show ===
With democracy restored in the Philippines and an increase of faith among Filipinos, Peyton saw the possibilities of developing a different type of program for the Philippines. After the poor reception to Ang Pamilya Ko on ABS-CBN, Peyton launched his one-hour once a week magazine talk show program.

Family Rosary Crusade premiered on March 7, 1987, for the relaunch of ABS-CBN as The Star Network (now Kapamilya Network).

In the 1990s, Family Rosary Crusade produced its own version of the 3 O Clock Prayer.

Every Saturday morning, Peyton appeared on ABS-CBN to start the program with the praying of the Rosary. He was later joined by a long-time advertising practitioner, Rosita "Babs" Hontiveros or "Tita Babs" (Auntie Babs) as the co-host. For almost five years, the program continued to air until Peyton's death in June 1992.

=== FRC after Peytons's death ===
Despite Peyton's death in 1992, the weekly television program Family Rosary Crusade continues to air on ABS-CBN with Babs Hontiveros as main host with James Reuter. Behind the scenes, a group of media volunteers continue to lend a hand in continuing with Peyton's mission, utilizing mass media as a handy tool for evangelization and the promotion of the praying of the Family Rosary.

Family Rosary Crusade was run by Gennie Q. Jota who served as executive director and recruited volunteers to write and contribute almost anything to keep the program running. Veteran sound engineer, Beda Orquejo, who was met by Peyton at the old government television network under Marcos' time, left his regular work with the network to serve as all-around technical person. Orquejo served as director, cameraman and editor of the weekly episodes of Family Rosary Crusade.

Several television networks also sought programs of Family Rosary Crusade, aired for with free airtime and without advertisements. From 1992 up to 2002, Family Rosary Crusade had almost 40 hours of free airtime to fill for television networks like People's Television (PTV), Radio Philippines Network (RPN), ABS-CBN Corporation (ABS-CBN) and Associated Broadcasting Company (ABC). Family Rosary Crusade's locally produced programs and a library of films produced by Family Theater in the United States aired throughout this period.

On February 21, 1992, the Associated Broadcasting Company (ABC) resumed its broadcast operations after it had been shut down by martial law in 1972. The television network became an official carrier for Family Rosary Crusade. The network utilized as part of its station identification at the top of every hour a plug wherein the Blessed Virgin Mary appealed to Filipinos to pray the Rosary with the closing standard slogan, "The family that prays together stays together." The plug ran on ABC from the reopening on February 21, 1992, to the relaunching as Iba Tayo! on April 12, 2004, after businessman Tonyboy Cojuangco purchased the network.

The increase in available airtime required more programming to produce, and this called in for more volunteers.

Jota and Beda Orquejo recruited several personalities to appear on the Family Rosary Crusade. Dominican priest Larry Faraon, OP joined Family Rosary Crusade as a younger voice for inspiration for the younger audience. Younger hosts joined Faraon; Loudette Zaragosa Banson, who appeared on Reuter's drama programs, was joined by radio drama personality Bernard Factor-Cañaberal as the two main hosts of the magazine talk show Family Rosary Crusade. Inspirational motivator Claudine Zialcita later joined the three other hosts to become the news reader for a segment called, "Religious Update."

Between the 1990s and 2000s, Family Rosary Crusade aired a lot of PSA's like the Pueblo Amante de Maria or also known as Bayang Sumisinta Kay Maria and We Ask for Peace.

Reuter had a daily program on ABC called Three Minutes a Day which aired at 3:00 pm for three minutes. He reflected on the day's Gospel reading from October 5, 1998, to August 8, 2008.

ABS-CBN's flagship Channel 2 continued to air it until 2003. That same year, Studio 23 began to air the program, airing at 7:00 am every Sunday, the sister channel had carried the program since its launch in 1996 with a 30-minute edition. FRC continued with its magazine type programming with talks and discussions related to themes of the Catholic Church with sole host Bernard Cañaberal and supported by Claudine Zialcita, Ces Datu and guest priest Gospel homilist.

In March 2010, Family Rosary Crusade got a new National Director, a member of the Congregation of Holy Cross from the South Asia province, Roque D'Acosta, CSC, formerly a Spiritual Director for the FRC for two years. The Family Rosary Crusade also left its 50-year office in Pope Pius XII Catholic Center in the Archdiocese of Manila. It moved to a formation house/television studio in Loyola Heights, Quezon City within the recently created Diocese of Cubao. The new office has since served as its studios and production facilities and formation house for future members of the mission of the Congregation of Holy Cross in the Philippines.

On January 19, 2014, after Studio 23 reformatted as S+A, Family Rosary Crusade continued to air every Saturday at 5:00 AM.

On November 17, 2018, Family Rosary Crusade aired its last episode on National TV, owing to S+A's increased focus on daily sports programs. They continue to produce new episodes for broadcast on Facebook and YouTube, while TV Maria continues to air re-runs of the show.

== Current programming ==
On the 21st anniversary of the program incarnation of Family Rosary Crusade on television, long-time guest host Erick Santos, of the Archdiocese of Manila and parish priest of the Shrine of the Child Jesus in the district of Tondo in Manila, joined the FRC program as its main host on March 14, 2010, replacing long-time host Bernard Cañaberal.

The program continues with its magazine type programming with talks and discussions related to themes of the Catholic Church.

== Hosts ==
Rev. Fr. Erick Santos begins his first official taping for the Family Rosary Crusade taken at the makeshift studios at the Mother Teresa Chapel inside the Holy Child Parochial School in Tondo, Manila

=== Current Hosts ===
- Rev. Fr. Allan Samonte - main host
- Chi Datu-Bocobo - segment host for Kwentong Buhay (Life Stories)
- Claudine Zialcita - segment host for Dateline FRC
- Bernard Factor Cañaberal - segment host for Once Upon a Saint

=== Former Hosts ===
- Loudette Zaragoza-Banson
- Rev. Fr. James Reuter, SJ
- Rev. Fr. Larry Faraon, OP
- Rev. Fr. Erick Santos
- Rev. Fr. Joel Francis Victorino

=== Segments ===
- Church Alive - a 10-minute segment where guest panelists explain events and issues in the Philippine Catholic church.
- Dateline FRC - a world summary of important news & events within and affecting the Catholic Church.
- Kwentong Buhay - (Life Stories) short inspirational storytelling of one's spiritual discovery, life-changing work of faith through prayers.
- Once Upon A Saint - a fun way of re-telling the life of saints before elementary and high school students.
- Sunday Gospel Reflections - reflections and inspirations based on the Sunday gospel as explained by a guest priest.
- Three Minutes a Day with Father James Reuter SJ - Monday to Saturday gospel reflections aired on ABC 5 (now TV5) from 1998 to 2008.

== See also ==
- Official site of Family Rosary Crusade: Philippines
- Official site of the Holy Cross Family Ministries
