= DYFJ =

Radio station in Bacolod, Philippines

RJFM Bacolod (DYFJ)
Simulcast of DZRJ-FM Manila
- Bacolod; Philippines
- Broadcast area: Northern Negros Island, parts of Iloilo and Guimaras
- Frequency: 99.9 MHz
- Branding: 100.3 RJFM

Programming
- Language: English
- Format: Adult Hits

Ownership
- Owner: Rajah Broadcasting Network; (Free Air Broadcasting Network, Inc.)

History
- First air date: 1985
- Call sign meaning: Don Fernando Jacinto, father of Ramon Jacinto

Technical information
- Licensing authority: NTC
- Power: 10,000 watts
- ERP: 35,000 Watts

Links
- Website: www.RJplanet.com

DYFJ (99.9 FM) is a relay station of RJFM Manila, owned and operated by Rajah Broadcasting Network through its licensee Free Air Broadcasting Network, Inc. The station's transmitter is located along Cuadra St., Brgy., Pahanocoy, Bacolod.
