= DXRJ-FM =

Radio station in Cagayan de Oro, Philippines

RJFM CDO (DXRJ)
Relay of DZRJ-FM Manila
- Cagayan de Oro; Philippines
- Broadcast area: Misamis Oriental, Northern Bukidnon and surrounding areas
- Frequency: 88.5 MHz
- Branding: 100.3 RJFM

Programming
- Language: English
- Format: Adult Hits

Ownership
- Owner: Rajah Broadcasting Network; (Free Air Broadcasting Network, Inc.)

History
- First air date: 1987
- Call sign meaning: Ramon Jacinto (founder, Rajah Broadcasting Network)

Technical information
- Licensing authority: NTC
- Power: 10,000 watts
- ERP: 20,000 watts

DXRJ (88.5 FM) is a relay station of RJFM Manila, owned and operated by Rajah Broadcasting Network through its licensee Free Air Broadcasting Network, Inc. The station's relay transmitter is located at Pryce Plaza Hotel, Carmen Hill, Cagayan de Oro.
