= Rey Langit =

Filipino broadcaster (born 1948)

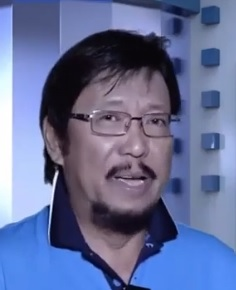
- Langit in 2022
- Born: Reynante Magat Langit; September 20, 1948 (age 78); Pampanga, Philippines
- Other names: Rey Sky, Rey Heaven, Pareng Rey
- Education: Far Eastern University (BS)
- Years active: 1969–present
- Employer: DWAR Abante Radyo 1494
- Political party: PDP–Laban (2021–present); UNA (c. 2015 – c. 2016); Lakas–Kampi–CMD (c. 2009 – c. 2010); Reporma-LM (c. 1997 – c. 1998)
- Spouse: Ester Dino
- Children: 2

Reynante "Rey" Magat Langit (Tagalog: [reɪ ˈlaŋɪt]; born September 20, 1948) is a Filipino journalist. He is a longtime columnist for Philippine newspapers Tempo, Balita, People's Tonight, and Pilipino Mirror. He is also the main anchorman for the nationally-aired program over AM radio station DWAR Abante Radyo 1494 in Mega Manila. He currently hosts two weekly public affairs television programs, Kasangga Mo ang Langit and Biyaheng Langit; the former is now airing on the Bilyonaryo News Channel (even his surname means "sky" or "heaven" in Tagalog) since 2025.

== Early life ==
Langit expressed his dynamism at a very young age. He would pull the weeds in a Chinese neighbor's garden for ten centavos a bundle, drove a pedicab, sell comics magazines to his classmates, and would even sell native foods like "kakanin" (sticky rice cake) and "matamis na bao" (sweetened coconut) to them at snack time to support his schooling expenses. He finished his primary education at the Felipe G. Calderon Elementary School, a public school in Manila. He started his secondary education at Manuel L. Quezon University and finished the rest of his high school education at the Far Eastern University Boys High School.

Already a working student, he pursued his college education at the Far Eastern University. He is a BS Commerce graduate and a student leader. He was a Director of the Order of Parliamentarians Confraternity; President of the IABF Banking Association; a Model Cadet and ROTC Officer; undisputed “Duplo King”; President of FEU Philippine Cultural Performance Arts Group; RHO OMEGA TAU Fraternity; and a Director of the FEU Progressive Party. He finished second year law at the FEU College of Law.

== Journalistic career ==
Rey Langit went on to join the media, becoming a radio announcer, anchorman, and commentator. His public service programs addressed the concerns of Filipinos, including OCWs (Overseas Contract Workers, now referred to as OFWs - Overseas Filipino Workers) and their families. He served as a point of contact between ordinary Filipinos and the government and its agencies in resolving their concerns. He has received commendations, honors, awards and recognitions from both local and international groups and entities in recognition of his public service programs and activities.

Known for his unique and unmistakable booming voice, Pareng Rey or Sky, has been on the air for more than four decades. Millions of Filipinos start their day listening to Pareng Rey on the radio as he informs them of the current events and pressing issues that affect their lives. During the People Power Revolution that installed Cory Aquino into power in 1986, Langit was continuously on the air for two days. Other radio stations had stopped broadcasting midway into the revolt, but Langit refused to be silenced. His voice became the only resource for millions of Filipinos who wanted to know what was going on in the country's capital. He reported on troop movements all over the city, and as ordinary citizens began walking out of their homes, and gathering on the streets to keep vigil and form human barricades. Langit first used the term "People Power", which went on to become the popular term used for the first peaceful revolution. In 1989, with the Aquino Administration far from being stable, Langit once more became the voice that the Filipino masses listened to as he courageously reported on what became a series of coup d'état attempt to overthrow the Aquino administration. Pareng Rey Langit was awarded the prestigious "Radio Broadcast Journalist of the Year" award given by the Rotary Club of Manila the following year. In 2004, Langit was once more named "Radio Broadcast Journalist of the Year" by the Rotary Club of Manila for his outstanding achievements in public service through broadcast media and his exceptional and in- depth reports on relevant and important issues. He was cited for his dedication to helping overseas Filipino workers through his various TV and radio programs.

Aside from his broadcasting career, Langit also held leadership roles. He served as Station Manager of the AM Radio station DWIZ 882 kHz and vice president of Aliw Broadcasting Corporation until 2016, when he ran for Senator but was unsuccessful. Following the elections and the death of Aliw Broadcasting Corporation chairman Antonio Cabangon-Chua, Langit departed from DWIZ after 24 years and subsequently worked at DZRJ 810 kHz Radyo Bandido (where his radio programme aired until 2022), DZEC 1062 from 2022 to 2025, and Abante Radyo 1494 since March 2025. He has also anchored television programs, including "Insider Exclusive Kapihan", "Kasangga Mo ang Langit" (which has aired on the Bilyonaryo News Channel since March 2025), and "Balitang Tanghali" on PTV.

He is also the chairman of the Kapisanan ng mga Brodkaster ng Pilipinas-Metro Manila Chapter and is a member of the board of directors of the KBP-National. Langit is also the Chairman of the Heavenly Images Productions for Television, Inc. (HIP TV, Inc.) which is an independent media production house producing its own television and radio programs.

== Personal life ==
Rey Langit is married to Ester Dino Langit and has two sons, Reyster (March 14, 1973 – June 2, 2005) and Reynante Langit, Jr. (JR, born April 11. 1976). His parents are Vidal C. Langit and Esperanza M. Langit buried at Loyola Memorial Park. In 2005, His late son, Reyster Langit, also a journalist, died of heart failure due to cerebral malaria, a disease he contracted in Palawan while on assignment for the public affairs program Kasangga Mo Ang Langit. His youngest son, JR, has since joined him in the field of broadcasting.

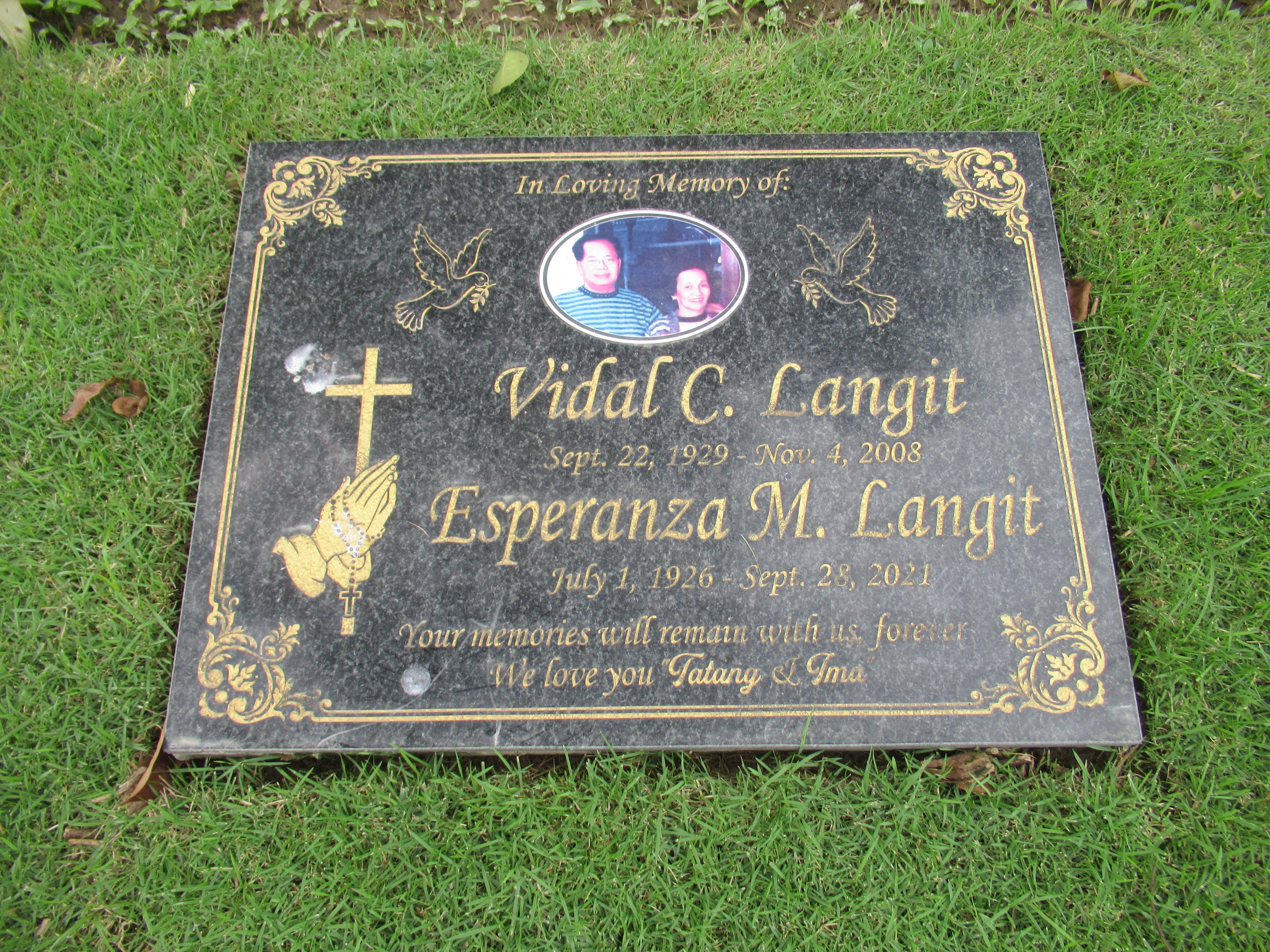
Langit's parents Vidal C. Langit and Esperanza M. Langit grave

=== Politics ===
Langit ran for a Senate seat in the 1998, 2010, 2016 and 2022 elections under Reporma-LM, Lakas Kampi–CMD, the United Nationalist Alliance (UNA), and PDP–Laban respectively but lost all.

== Electoral history ==
Electoral history of Rey Langit
| Year | Office | Party | Votes received | | | | Result |
| Year | Office | Party | Total | % | P. | Swing | Result |
|---|---|---|---|---|---|---|---|
| 1998 | Senator of the Philippines | Reporma–LM | 3,930,085 | 13.42% | 25th | —N/a | Lost |
| 2010 | Senator of the Philippines | Lakas–Kampi | 2,694,213 | 7.06% | 30th | -6.36 | Lost |
| 2016 | Senator of the Philippines | UNA | 1,857,630 | 4.13% | 28th | -2.93 | Lost |
| 2022 | Senator of the Philippines | PDP–Laban | 1,364,548 | 2.46% | 43rd | -1.67 | Lost |

== Filmography ==
=== Film ===
- Ang Padrino (1984) (as FPJ's hired assassin)
- Muslim .357 (1986)
- May Isang Tsuper ng Taxi (1990) (cameo role as a former DZRH Radio Announcer)
- Tora, Tora, Bang, Bang, Bang, Bang (1990)
- To Saudi With Love (1997)
- Pepot Artista (2005)
- Muslim Magnum 357 (2014)

=== Radio ===
- Kasangga Mo ang Langit (Abante Radyo 1494; formerly aired on DWIZ, DZRJ Radyo Bandido 810 and DZEC 1062)

=== Television ===
- Kasangga Mo ang Langit
- Teledyaryo
- Biyaheng Langit
- Action 9
- Wazzup Wazzup
- FPJ's Batang Quiapo
