= IC3 Convention Center =

IEC Convention Center of Cebu
- Interactive map of the IEC Convention Center of Cebu area
- Former names: International Eucharistic Congress Pavilion
- Alternative names: IC3 Convention Center

General information
- Status: Completed
- Type: Convention center
- Location: 23 Minore Park, Pope John Paul II Avenue corner Cardinal Rosales Avenue, Brgy. Luz, Cebu City, Philippines
- Coordinates: 10°19′18″N 123°54′30″E
- Construction started: 2014
- Completed: 2015
- Inaugurated: November 22, 2015
- Renovated: 2016
- Cost: ₱550 million
- Owner: Archdiocese of Cebu

Technical details
- Floor count: 2
- Grounds: 2.5 ha (6.2 acres)

Design and construction
- Architect: Carlos Pio Zafra
- Main contractor: Duros Development Corporation

Other information
- Seating capacity: 10,000 (2017)
- Parking: 225 slots (2017)

Website
- ic3.com.ph

The IEC Convention Center of Cebu or the IC3 Convention Center (formerly the International Eucharistic Congress Pavilion) is a convention center within the grounds of the 23 Minore Park development along Pope John Paul II Avenue in Barangay Luz, Cebu City, Philippines. The convention center was built in order to host the 2016 International Eucharistic Congress held in the city.

The facility is owned by the Archdiocese of Cebu and is managed by Regent Property International.

== History ==
=== Background and prior plans ===
In 2016, Cebu City was due to host the International Eucharistic Congress (IEC), leading the Archdiocese of Cebu to seek the development of a venue for the congress.

It was planned that a venue would be built out of the unfinished shell of a privately owned commercial building behind Parkmall in Mandaue, which was also nearby the Cebu International Convention Center. However, such plans were scrapped in favor of building a venue within the seminary compound of the Archdiocese so that the facility, which would be used for other events of the local church after the IEC, would be more accessible to the archdiocese's constituents.

=== Construction ===
The groundbreaking for the IEC Pavilion took place on February 15, 2014, which was attended by various officials of the Archdiocese of Cebu as well as local government officials. Construction commenced in July 2014 and the building was topped off on July 15, 2015.

The secretariat and plenary buildings were, respectively, 95 percent and 69 percent complete by July 2015. Overall, the facility was 82.8 percent completed by July 2015, with the target completion date remaining September 2015.

By November 2015, the structure was 97 percent complete with structural and architectural aspects already complete and only finishing touches left to be done.

The construction of the IEC Pavilion cost approximately ₱550 million total.

=== Turnover ===
Duros Development Corporation, the contractors of the IEC Pavilion, turned over the facility to the Archdiocese of Cebu on November 21, 2015. The following day, on November 22, 2015 (which also happened to be the Feast of Christ the King), the IEC Pavilion was opened to the public. The facility was consecrated to Christ the King in a ceremony attended by 7,000 people.

=== Turnover and inauguration ===
In October 2016, Regent Property International, a firm linked to Duros Construction Inc., formally took over the management of the venue.

The former IEC Pavilion was subsequently redeveloped into a full-fledged convention center. On December 15, 2016, Duros Land inaugurated the venue as the "IEC Convention Center of Cebu" or the "IC3 Convention Center" The St. John XXII Minore Seminary, where the convention center stood, was converted into a development by Duros Land known as the 23 Minore Park. The redevelopment of the seminary took about six months and was completed by December 2016.

The Archdiocese of Cebu (the owners of the property) have granted Duros Land permissions to manage the venue's operation for the next 25 years.

== Events ==
The IC3 Convention Center was built as the IEC Pavilion, intended as the primary venue of the 2016 International Eucharistic Congress.

Following the congress, the center hosted many religious activities. These were organized mainly by its owner, the Archdiocese of Cebu. On May 18, 2017, ALA Boxing Promotions announced that the center will host Pinoy Pride 41, a boxing event headlined by Thai boxer Komgrich Nantapech and Donnie Nietes.

== Other use ==
During the COVID-19 pandemic, a 130-bed capacity quarantine facility for mild and moderate COVID-19 patients was set up in the convention center.

== Architecture and design ==
“I was tempted to make flamboyant design especially for the international events like IEC to highlight creativity…I control flamboyance to come up with a design which is spiritual. It was really daunting for me to design or create a space that is grant but has to be humble at the same time,”

— Carlos Pio Zafra, architect of the IEC Pavilion describing his experience on designing the pavilion.

The IC3 Convention Center was constructed by the property developer Duros Development Corporation, which also financed the project for usufructuary rights for 25 years over the facility. Among the people involved in the construction of the project were architect Carlos Pio Zafra and project-in-charge Engineer Adonis Gabutin. Rizal Camangyan Jr. was also reported to have been involved as a construction manager.

During the groundbreaking ceremony of the IC3 Convention Center as the IEC Pavilion, IEC secretary Msgr. Dennis Villarojo explained that the structure was dubbed a "pavilion" because the venue would not be a convention center with high-end amenities. He described the would-be structure as "simple", and that it would provide delegates of the 2016 congress "a comfortable and decent venue".

Zafra, the architect of the IEC Pavilion said he was instructed to design the building in a "simple" manner. Camangyan noted that Villarojo had called for "low maintenance building", specifying that there would be no finishes to be done on the floor such that it would be able to be cleaned using a standard mop. Likewise, the walls and ceiling were bare and unadorned. The facility was also to be designed to be earthquake-resistant.

== Facilities ==
Prior to expansion, the IEC Pavilion contained a plenary hall, a secretariat building, a chapel, a media center, and holding rooms for bishops and priests. The pavilion had three levels.

As the IC3 Convention Center, the venue has 10,000 seating capacity. It holds three convention halls and a function room. Hall A has a capacity of 3,000 people, Hall B 5,000 people, and Hall C 2,000 people.

The second level of the convention center, which can be used as a wedding venue and for medium-scale conferences, can seat approximately 500 people. The facility also hosts a holding room for performers and breakout rooms for small-scale gatherings. The grand hallway of the convention center is dubbed as the "Ganghaan Walk", where photos of the 2016 International Eucharistic Congress are exhibited.

There are 255 parking spots available.
