= DYNB-TV =

DYNB-DTV (One Sports 18 Iloilo)
- Jordan, Guimaras; Philippines
- City: Iloilo City
- Channels: Digital: DYMB-TV 18 (UHF) (ISDB-T) (Test Broadcast); Virtual: 36.3
- Branding: One Sports 18 Iloilo

Programming
- Affiliations: One Sports (O&O)

Ownership
- Owner: Nation Broadcasting Corporation (TV5 Network Inc.)
- Sister stations: DYCR-DTV (RPTV); DYMB-TV (TV5)

History
- Founded: 1996
- Former call signs: DYRJ-TV (1996–2008); DYNB-TV (2011–2018)
- Former channel number: Analog: 46 (UHF) (1996–2018)
- Former affiliations: RJTV (1996–2008); TV5 (2008–2012); AksyonTV (2012–2019); 5 Plus (2019–2020)
- Call sign meaning: DY; Nation Broadcasting Corporation

Technical information
- ERP: 5 kW

Links
- Website: www.onesports.ph

DYNB-DTV, channel 18 (36.3), is a digital relay television station owned by Nation Broadcasting Corporation, is the affiliated station of the Philippine television network One Sports; The station its sister company of TV5 Network Inc. Its transmitter is located at Piña-Tamborong-Alaguisoc Road, Jordan, Guimaras Province.

== See also ==
- DWNB-TV
- TV5
- One Sports
- List of television and radio stations owned by TV5 Network
