= Cebu Catholic Television Network =

Television channel in Cebu City, Philippines

- Country: Philippines
- Broadcast area: Metro Cebu, Metro Manila, Cavite, Visayas, Mindanao
- Affiliates: DYRF-AM
- Headquarters: Cardinal Rosales Avenue, Cebu Business Park, Cebu City

Programming
- Language: Cebuano

Ownership
- Owner: Roman Catholic Archdiocese of Cebu; Radio Veritas - Global Broadcasting System, Inc. Fil-Products Group of Companies

History
- Launched: December 17, 2002; 23 years ago

Links
- Webcast: www.cctn47.com
- Website: www.cctn47.com

Availability

Terrestrial
- Cebu: 47 (UHF) Digital

Cebu Catholic Television Network (CCTN) is a broadcast television channel jointly owned by the Roman Catholic Archdiocese of Cebu and Fil-Products Group of Companies in the Philippines, with the Global Broadcasting System as its terrestrial broadcaster. CCTN's facilities are located at the CCTN Broadcast Center, Cardinal Rosales Avenue, Cebu Business Park, Cebu City. It is the Philippines' first ever Catholic television station on cable and free-to-air television (before TV Maria Philippines began broadcasting on pay TV in 2007), and the second to launch in Southeast Asia, behind Thailand's Global Buddhist Network (GBN).

== History ==
Cebu Catholic Television Network Channel 47 (CCTN), founded by its president, Nonito “Dodong” Limchua, signed on in 2002 as the country's pioneer Catholic TV station. After his stint in the cable business, Nonito started family relationship programs that promote Gospel values, and bring the message and teachings of the Catholic Church to the people. Since he and wife Diana are devout Catholics, they have been involved in Walking with Jesus Seminars. Together, they shared their vision with the Archbishop of Cebu, Cardinal Ricardo Vidal, and he supported them in their desire for others to see the face of Christ through professional coverage of events, documentaries and issues concerning the Catholic Church. The impetus was the creation of a Catholic TV station on the same lines as EWTN and Catholic TV in the US but adapted for Philippine conditions. Just as Cebu proved to be the springboard for Philippine Christianity, its launch finally placed the country on the forefront of Catholic TV programming on par with other channels.

Just on its first three years since it was launched in 2002, CCTN gained popularity along Central Visayas and reached out its viewers to Eastern Visayas, Zamboanga Peninsula and Northern Mindanao.

Since it was launched, CCTN exists with various names. Started as CCTN in 2002, the station was rebranded as INTV in 2008 with the slogan Inform, Inspire, Interact. Following the rebranding was the station's website at intv.com.ph. Then in 2012, the network tries to bring back the CCTN name and rebranded as INTV powered by CCTN. In 2013, the network then removed the INTV name and rebranded as, CCTN 47. Their website was then moved to cctn47.com as their old website with the INTV brand was dropped.

Today, CCTN reaches its broadcast signals to Metro Manila, Cavite, Sarangani, Agusan del Norte, Misamis Occidental and Zamboanga Sibugay, via local cable providers.

On early 2026, CCTN ceased operations on analog terrestrial television broadcast on UHF Channel 47 in preparation for digital terrestrial television transition and continued to its Pay TV and IPTV users.

On August 1, 2026, CCTN went back on air after its transition to digital terrestrial television broadcast on UHF Channel 47.

== Programming ==
CCTN's regular programming primarily consists of daily Catholic mass services and other Catholic-related programs, news and current affairs, serial and seasonal dramas, sitcoms, variety and talk shows, and canned programs; all are broadcasting in Cebuano language.

The popular newscast of CCTN is Sayri 47.

== Affiliates ==
- San Gabriel Productions
- Total Viewing Productions
- Cebu City Council
- M-Talent Events and Promotions
- DYRF-AM
- DYLA
- DYHP-RMN Cebu
- Veritas 846 Manila
- TV Maria

== See also ==
- Catholic television
- Catholic television channels
- Catholic television networks
- TV Maria
