= DZRV =

DZRV may refer to:

- DZRV-AM, an AM radio station broadcasting in Metro Manila, branded as Veritas 846
- DZRV-FM, an FM radio station broadcasting in Bayombong, branded as Spirit FM
