= TV Maria =

Catholic television network in the Philippines

- Country: Philippines
- Broadcast area: Worldwide
- Headquarters: Manila; Philippines

Programming
- Languages: English; Filipino
- Picture format: 1080i (HDTV) (downscaled to 480i for the SDTV feed DTT)

Ownership
- Owner: Roman Catholic Archdiocese of Manila; Catholic Bishops' Conference of the Philippines; TV Maria Foundation Philippines, Inc.
- Sister channels: Veritas 846; Catholic Media Network

History
- Launched: January 1, 2006; 20 years ago (test broadcast); August 13, 2007; 19 years ago (full launch)

Links
- Website: www.tvmaria.ph

Availability

Terrestrial
- Digital terrestrial television: Channel 29.25 (Metro Manila); Channel 48.04 (Naga City); Channel 47.03 (Cebu City)
- SkyCable (Metro Manila): Channel 210
- Sky Direct (Nationwide): Channel 49
- Cignal TV (Nationwide): Channel 188
- SatLite (Nationwide): Channel 102

Streaming media
- TV Maria website (via YouTube): Watch Live

TV Maria is a national Catholic television channel broadcasting from Manila, Philippines. Owned by TV Maria Foundation Philippines (a non-profit, non-stock organization under the Catholic Bishops' Conference of the Philippines and the Roman Catholic Archdiocese of Manila), it airs 24 hours a day and is currently available on major and provincial cable and Satellite television operators nationwide, on digital terrestrial television broadcasts via RJ DigiTV's DTT subchannel in Mega Manila — which operates daily (except Good Friday annually — from 6 am to 12 midnight of the following day), via GNN's DTT subchannel in selected provincial areas, and via online livestreaming.

Most of the station's programmes are both in-house productions and packaged shows from Jesuit Communications Foundation, Kerygma Foundation, Family Rosary Crusade, Society of St. Paul, and other Catholic groups.

== History ==
The Roman Catholic Church recognizes the importance of keeping up with the times to reach out to a greater number of people. And TV Maria is its means to cater to a Filipino audience who are hungry for God's Word through television as well as through various alternatives such as the internet and the cellphone.

TV Maria Foundation Philippines, Inc. – or simply known as TV Maria – is a non-profit, non-stock religious organization of the Catholic Bishops' Conference of the Philippines through the Roman Catholic Archdiocese of Manila. Its work mainly involves evangelizing the Catholic faith through television and internet broadcasting, plus other forms of modern communication. It promotes not only the importance of communication and information in building a nation but also the importance of interweaving these with Catholic Filipino values.

TV Maria began test broadcasting on 1 January 2006 and began regular transmission on 4 December 2006, the Feast of the Immaculate Conception.

On 13 August 2013, during a press conference for the upcoming Philippine Conference on New Evangelization, Archbishop of Manila Cardinal Luis Antonio Tagle announced that TV Maria finally granted its pay-TV-to-air television franchise from the National Telecommunications Commission.

Starting 2015, TV Maria began to broadcast its Misa Nazareno mass from historic Quiapo Church live via video streaming, as well as certain Papal Masses via EWTN. Since Holy Week 2016, TV Maria also started live broadcasts of Holy Week activities in the Manila Cathedral using the 16:9 widescreen format.

On 11 March 2020, TV Maria was launched on digital terrestrial television on UHF Channel 29 (563.143 MHz) in Metro Manila and surrounding provinces after it signed a partnership deal with Rajah Broadcasting Network.

On September 6 and 7, 2024, TV Maria and Aliw Broadcasting Corporation separately announced through their respective Facebook pages that some TV Maria original programming would air every Sunday on Aliw Channel 23, starting September 8, 2024.

== See also ==
- Catholic television
- Catholic television channels
- Catholic television networks
- Cebu Catholic Television Network
- Padre Pio TV
- Radio Maria
