= DZRJ-FM =

Radio station in Metro Manila, Philippines

RJFM (DZRJ)

Makati; Philippines
- Broadcast area: Mega Manila and surrounding areas
- Frequency: 100.3 MHz
- RDS: RJ 100
- Branding: 100.3 RJFM

Programming
- Language: English
- Format: Adult Hits
- Affiliations: BBC World Service; (news bulletin only)

Ownership
- Owner: Rajah Broadcasting Network; (Free Air Broadcasting Network, Inc.)
- Sister stations: DZRJ 810 AM; RJ DigiTV

History
- First air date: August 1963 (on AM); 1973 (on FM)
- Former call signs: DZUW (1963–1980); DWNK (1980–1986)
- Former frequencies: 1310 kHz (1963–1973)
- Call sign meaning: Ramon Jacinto (founder, Rajah Broadcasting Network)

Technical information
- Licensing authority: NTC
- Class: A, B, upper C
- Power: 25,000 watts
- ERP: 60,000 watts
- Repeater: See RJFM stations

Links
- Webcast: Live Stream

DZRJ (100.3 FM), broadcasting as 100.3 RJFM, is a radio station owned and operated by Rajah Broadcasting Network through its licensee Free Air Broadcasting Network, Inc. The station's studio is located at 7849 General Luna Street corner Makati Avenue, Barangay Poblacion, Makati, while its transmitter is located along Merano Street, Barangay San Roque, Antipolo (sharing facilities with sister station RJ DigiTV).

== History ==
The station was once known as DZUW-AM under the joint ownership of Republic Broadcasting System and Rajah Broadcasting Network. It is the third AM station of RBS after DZBB and DZXX. Originally broadcasting on 1310 kHz AM, it moved to 100.3 MHz FM in 1973. In 1980, 100.3 FM was reformatted as 100.3 Wink FM and it changed its callsign to DWNK-FM. It was staffed by all-female DJs.

Around 1986, during the Philippines' historic People Power Revolution, DZRJ-AM reformatted as Radyo Bandido with a news and talk format. Meanwhile, its album rock format transferred to the then-newly acquired 100.3 FM under the call letters DZRJ. As a result, it carried the brand RJFM: The Original Rock and Roll Radio.

In December 1995, it rebranded as Boss Radio and shifted to a classic rock format, focusing on the 50s, 60s and 70s. Among its on-air personalities were Eddie Mercado, Bong Lapira, Lito Gorospe, Larry Abando, Manny Caringal, Ronnie Quintos, Naldi Castro and Cito Paredes. By this time, it officially launched its nationwide satellite broadcasting, a first in the history of the company to achieve this milestone.

In June 1999, it rebranded as The Hive and switched to an alternative rock format.

On May 6, 2001, it rebranded as RJFM and switched to a variety hits format, airing music from the 1960s to the present-day, with its Sunday programming reserved for music from the 1950s and 1960s (Oldies). Initially fully automated, it was in May 2003 when it started having on-air jocks. RJFM has a daily morning program called Beatles Anthology, featuring the songs of The Beatles for one whole hour.

== See also ==
- DZRJ 810 AM
- RJ DigiTV 29
