= DZRJ-DTV =

Television station in Makati, Philippines

RJ DigiTV (DZRJ-DTV)
- Metro Manila; Philippines
- City: Makati
- Channels: Digital: 29 (UHF) (ISDB-T); Virtual: 29

Programming
- Language: English (mainly)
- Subchannels: See list
- Affiliations: 29.21: RJTV (Independent); 29.22: Timeless TV; 29.23: Radyo Bandido TV; 29.24: Rock of Manila TV; 29.25: TV Maria

Ownership
- Owner: Rajah Broadcasting Network
- Sister stations: DZRJ-AM, DZRJ-FM

History
- First air date: May 3, 1993 (analog)
- Former call signs: DZRJ-TV (1993–2018)
- Former channel numbers: Analog: 29 (UHF, 1993–2018); Digital: 30 (UHF, 2019–)
- Former affiliations: 2nd Avenue (2008–2018); Oras ng Himala Channel (2019–2023)
- Call sign meaning: Ramon Jacinto (owner and founder of RBN)

Technical information
- Licensing authority: NTC
- Power: 2.5 kW
- ERP: 10 kW
- Transmitter coordinates: 14°34′20″N 121°10′28″E

Links
- Website: www.rjplanet.com

DZRJ-DTV (channel 29) is a commercial independent digital-only television station based in Makati City, Metro Manila, Philippines. The station is the flagship TV property of Rajah Broadcasting Network, Inc., a broadcast company owned by long-time guitarist/musician Ramon "RJ" Jacinto. The station's broadcast facilities, shared with its AM and FM radio sisters, are located at the Ventures I Bldg., Makati Ave. cor. Gen. Luna St., Brgy. Poblacion, Makati; DZRJ-DTV's transmitter facility is located at Merano Street, Brgy. San Roque, Antipolo City, Rizal (sharing facilities with sister station 100.3 RJ FM).

DZRJ-DTV began in 1993 as DZRJ-TV which operated on UHF Channel 29 using the analog NTSC-M system from 1993 to 2018.

== Background ==
=== First years (1993–2008) ===
Ramon "RJ" Jacinto's TV property began its test broadcast in April 1993 through UHF TV channel 29 using the Analog NTSC-M system. The station then launched a month later as RJTV (Ramon Jacinto TeleVision), an independent television channel focusing on music oriented shows, local news, talk shows, and the very first local Home TV Shopping program.

On July 3, 1995, RJTV went into niche programming and timeless television series, shopping and animation programs for children. At the time, the target market was kids during the day, and baby boomers at night. RJTV became the strongest UHF TV station in the Philippines, broadcasting with the maximum effective radiated power of 700 kW. In 1997, due to the emergence of UHF competitors such as SBN-21, Studio 23, Citynet 27 and CTV-31, RJTV went from traditional TV programming to specialized programs such as direct response companies and religious sectors. RJTV recognized the advent of specialized television – niche markets that identify specific needs of certain sectors.

In 2003, RJTV experimented with its new programming approach, as it simulcasted its sister FM station RJ 100, which started its new trend called the 'TeleRadyo' concept through RJ's own program RJ Online (now known as RJ Sunday Jam; though it remains to air up to this day). It also became one of the channels who tried to conceptualize its interactive television approach, as it became a text-oriented interactive channel, first airing music videos, combined with the power of SMS messaging. Eventually, it aired programs simulcasted over RBN's radio station DZRJ AM in a visual format (TeleRadyo) during mornings, shopping programs during afternoons (at that time when RJTV signed-off during afternoons on free TV) and live entertainment programming during primetime, thus, the station adopted its slogan "Interactive TV Station". RJTV also aired programs, which aimed to direct its market approach at consumers; thus, its slogan was "Consumer Television."

=== Affiliation with Solar Entertainment (2008–2018) ===
On January 1, 2008, Solar Entertainment Corporation approached RJTV to blocktime one of the former's television channels to the latter. Months prior to the deal, SkyCable stated that they would offer less "redundant" programming and feature more series that had never been aired in the country before, but reports surfaced that channels operated by Solar were pulled due to a carriage dispute; SkyCable's owner, ABS-CBN Corporation, believed that Solar's lower fees for advertising on its channels were causing ABS-CBN to lose revenue. The new blocktime deal between RJTV, Radio Philippines Network, Southern Broadcasting Network, and Solar is said to be a part of the latter's retaliation to Sky. As a result, DZRJ-TV became a network-affiliated station for the first time in its history. The blocktime deal integrated Solar's 2nd Avenue to RJTV's programming. The said deal, however, closed down the station's Venture I broadcast facility and initially transferred its master control to Solar Entertainment's downlink facility in Antipolo prior to another transfer in 2012 to Solar's current playout facilities at Worldwide Corporate Center in Mandaluyong.

On September 9, 2012, the station temporarily ceased broadcasting together with DWVN-TV 45. It was found out that the channel 45 facility was struck by a lightning bolt, and had to shut off both station's transmitters for repair and inspection. The station returned on-air in the morning of November 21.

In 2015, DZRJ-TV's former in-house transmitter had finally pulled the plug and began leasing transmission from the Solar-owned transmitter tower also within Antipolo, sharing transmission with Solar's subsidiary, Southern Broadcasting Network. Solar provided the upgrade to provide a clearer and better signal reception for SBN and RJTV in both analog and digital signals.

=== Return to independent broadcasting (2018–present) ===
In May 2018, Solar Entertainment launched its own premium digital terrestrial TV service Easy TV. When the service promoted ETC and most of Solar's operated and distributed channels, 2nd Avenue was not included into the lineup. Solar and RJTV later announced their plans for the channel: 2nd Avenue would end all regularly scheduled programming (coinciding the mid-season break of US Television's primetime programming) and terrestrial transmission by June 5, while provincial cable and satellite providers would be provided with a lifeline service until June 30 featuring marathons of the channel's former inventory; after June 5, RJTV's affiliation deal with Solar would expire and would return to independence.

The new RJTV, now known as RJ DigiTV began airing at 12 midnight of June 5, with TV Shop Philippines as its first program to air during the test broadcast, followed by re-run of some of the local programs from RJTV's vast video library, including Pinoy Wrestling, classic programs aired on the station and RJ's concert specials. RJAM and RJFM's programs were also aired on the new channel. During its initial run, RJDigiTV operated 24/7.

Originally scheduled in July 2018, RJTV relaunched on January 3, 2019, with the first 2 subchannels, the main RJTV channel and Oras ng Himala channel, and later, the TeleRadyo-like channels of their sister radio stations DZRJ-AM and DZRJ-FM. It became the 2nd television station in the Philippines to end its analog transmission and went full-blown on its digital television broadcasts, using the ISDB-Tb digital TV system (more than a year after Light TV 33, though it still beams on analog through its provincial UHF stations) in 2021. Since June 1, 2026, RJ DigiTV operates daily from 6:00 AM to 12:00 MN of the next day.

== Technical information ==
=== Digital channels ===
DZRJ-TV operates on UHF Channel 29 (563.143 MHz) and is multiplexed into the following subchannels:

Subchannels of DZRJ-DTV
Channel	Video	Aspect	Short name	Programming	Note
29.21	480i	16:9	RJ DigiTV	Main DZRJ-TV programming/RJ DigiTV	Fully migrated from analog to digital (Still under test broadcast)
29.22	480i	16:9	Timeless TV	Timeless TV	Fully migrated from analog to digital (Still under test broadcast)
29.23	480i	16:9	Radyo Bandido TV	Radyo Bandido TV	Fully migrated from analog to digital (Still under test broadcast)
29.24	480i	16:9	Rock of Manila TV	Rock MNL	Fully migrated from analog to digital (Still under test broadcast)
29.25	480i	16:9	TV Maria	TV Maria	Fully migrated from analog to digital (Still under test broadcast)

==== Timeless TV ====
Timeless TV
- Country: Philippines
- Broadcast area: Philippines
- Headquarters: Metro Manila, Philippines

Programming
- Languages: English, Filipino
- Picture format: 16:9 480i (SDTV)

Ownership
- Owner: Rajah Broadcasting Network
- Sister channels: RJ DigiTV, Radyo Bandido TV, Rock of Manila TV

History
- Launched: July 1, 2023 (test broadcast)

Availability

Terrestrial
- RJTV (DTT): Channel 29 (29.21), Metro Manila

RJTV began launching Timeless TV on July 1, 2023, which is under test broadcast, on the subchannel space that was used to be occupied by Oras ng Himala Channel. The channel currently airs a selection of canned classic TV programs and movies.

==== Rock MNL ====
Rock MNL
- Country: Philippines
- Broadcast area: Philippines
- Headquarters: Makati, Philippines

Programming
- Languages: English, Filipino
- Picture format: 16:9 480i (SDTV)

Ownership
- Owner: Rajah Broadcasting Network
- Sister channels: RJ DigiTV, Radyo Bandido TV, Timeless TV

History
- Launched: September 1, 2019 (test broadcast); October 15, 2019 (soft launch); July 31, 2023 (grand launch)
- Former names: Rock of Manila TV (2019–2020); RJ Rock TV (2020–2023)

Availability

Terrestrial
- RJTV (DTT): Channel 29 (29.04), Metro Manila

Rajah Broadcasting Network began broadcasting its own 18-hour-a-day rock oriented music channel, Rock MNL (formerly RJ Rock TV and Rock of Manila TV), in late-2019 (fifteen years after UNTV Channel 37 (now UNTV News and Rescue)) abandoned its rock TV format from 2001 to 2004, eventually becoming the first public service TV station in the country). The subchannel features archived videos of rock-oriented content, as well as concert videos, produced by the now-defunct RJ Underground Radio 105.9 (now 105.9 True FM) and episodes of Pinoy Wrestling, which as aired of the main channel, prior to the launch.

It was relaunched on July 31, 2023, with an initial lineup of programming including the Manila Wrestling Federation's Aksyonovela TV and other lifestyle, motoring and rock music-oriented programs. At present, it operates daily from 6 am to 12 midnight on the following day.

==== TV Maria ====
TV Maria is a Filipino Catholic channel, owned by the Catholic Bishops Conference of the Philippines and the Roman Catholic Archdiocese of Manila through TV Maria Philippines Foundation, Inc., and features locally produced Roman Catholic programming from the station's in-house productions, as well as Family Rosary Crusade, Jesuit Communications, Kerygma TV (now Feast TV), Daughters of St. Paul, and other Catholic oriented groups, as well as selected canned programs outsourced from Eternal Word Television Network, alongside live coverage of the Holy Masses and other liturgical celebrations from Quiapo Church, Manila Cathedral, and other Catholic churches (strategically located within the jurisdiction of the Archdiocese of Manila).

==== Planned subchannels ====
The network plans to accommodate six digital channels that will air local & foreign content to the station. Among those channels are TeleRadyo simulcasts of its radio stations DZRJ-AM and DZRJ-FM.

=== Analog-to-digital transition ===
In 2015, Solar Entertainment supplied its DTV channels through the new platform. During its initial test, Solar placed both SBN and RJTV in its DWCP-TV digital signal on channel 22. For unknown reasons, the transmitter's encryption system was activated throughout its run, making two of the station's subchannels receivable only on set-top boxes with this capability. The technical issue was fixed by September 25, 2017.

Around the last quarter of 2017, Solar launched a second test transmission signal thru partner company Byers Communications (on behalf of RJTV) on channel 30, also using the facilities of SBN. However, RJTV announced in May 2018 that the station's analog signal would be shut down after 2nd Avenue programming closed down.

DZRJ-TV shut down its analog signal, over UHF channel 29, at 1:05 am of June 5, 2018. The shutdown was rumored to be done at midnight of the same day after a short promo of 2nd Avenue's impending closure, but miscommunication on when to pull the plug resulted in the station to be shut off on its regular 1:00 am sign off.

Byers, meanwhile, continued to operate the channel 30 signal, albeit removing the 2nd Avenue subchannel, until it became inactive in September 2019 as a result of Solar's halt in its Easy TV premium DTT service.

Initially, the station would flash cut its digital signal on July 15, 2018, to the former analog channel; numerous delays in the logistics and installation of their brand-new digital TV transmitter postponed the station's initial transmission until the 1st quarter of 2019. On January 3, 2019, RJTV made a flash cut sequence on its digital signal for post-transition operations, yet technical modifications were made to address audio issues with several integrated TV sets, mobile DTVs, and digital set-top box devices. Currently, DZRJ-DTV started broadcasting digitally with first 3 channels, the main RJTV channel, the Oras ng Himala channel (now Timeless TV), DZRJ RadioVision (now Radyo Bandido TV) and Rock of Manila TV (later RJ Rock TV and now Rock MNL). The subchannels of TV Shop Philippines and TV Maria have commenced on the 2nd Quarter of 2020.

== Areas of coverage ==
=== Primary areas ===
- Metro Manila
- Cavite
- Bulacan
- Laguna
- Rizal

==== Secondary areas ====
- Portion of Pampanga
- Portion of Bataan
- Portion of Tarlac
- Portion of Nueva Ecija
- Portion of Batangas

== See also ==
- Rajah Broadcasting Network
- DZRJ-AM 810 kHz
- RJFM 100.3
