= DZRJ-AM =

Radio station in Metro Manila, Philippines

Radyo Bandido (DZRJ)
- Makati; Philippines
- Broadcast area: Mega Manila and surrounding areas
- Frequency: 810 kHz
- Branding: DZRJ 810 Radyo Bandido

Programming
- Languages: Filipino, English
- Format: News, Public Affairs, Talk
- Affiliations: BBC World Service

Ownership
- Owner: Rajah Broadcasting Network; (Free Air Broadcasting Network, Inc.)
- Sister stations: 100.3 RJFM, RJDigiTV

History
- First air date: 1963
- Former frequencies: 780 kHz (1963–1978)
- Call sign meaning: Ramon Jacinto (founder)

Technical information
- Licensing authority: NTC
- Power: 50,000 watts

Links
- Webcast: Listen/Watch via Facebook Live; Listen/Watch via YouTube Live
- Website: RJplanet.com

Radyo Bandido TV
- Country: Philippines
- Broadcast area: Philippines
- Network: DZRJ 810 AM Radyo Bandido
- Affiliates: RJ DigiTV
- Headquarters: Ventures I Building, Makati Avenue corner General Luna Street, Makati

Programming
- Languages: Tagalog, English
- Picture format: 720p 16:9 (HDTV)

Ownership
- Owner: Rajah Broadcasting Network
- Sister channels: Rock MNL

History
- Launched: September 16, 2019; 6 years ago (test broadcast); October 15, 2019; 6 years ago (soft launch); February 13, 2020; 6 years ago (official launch)

Availability

Terrestrial
- Digital terrestrial television: Channel 29.3

Streaming media
- YouTube: Watch Live

DZRJ (810 AM) Radyo Bandido is a radio station owned and operated by Rajah Broadcasting Network through its licensee Free Air Broadcasting Network, Inc. Its studio is located at the 2nd Floor, Ventures I Building, Makati Avenue corner General Luna Street, Barangay Poblacion, Makati, while its transmitter is located along Km. 21 Quirino Highway, Barangay Pasong Putik, Novaliches, Quezon City.

== History ==
=== 1963–1986: Boss Radio ===
In 1963, the 17-year-old Ramon "RJ" Jacinto started operating the station in the backyard of his house together with his classmates from Ateneo de Manila University. Originally broadcast on the frequency of 780 kHz, it carried the tagline, "DzRJ: Boss Radio", which later evolved into "DzRJ, The Rock of Manila" as it hosted a daily show called "Pinoy Rock 'n' Rhythm" (later shortened to "Pinoy Rock"), which was conceived by DzRJ's original station manager, Alan Austria ("Double-A") and its program director, Emil Quinto ("Charlie Brown"). DZRJ's radio personalities, the "Bossmen", then the "RockJocks", became celebrities in Manila's counterculture.

==== Pinoy Rock 'n' Rhythm ====
The daily Pinoy Rock 'n' Rhythm radio show, which was hosted by Bob Lopez-Pozas ("Bob Magoo") and later by Dante David ("Howlin' Dave"), featured the early vinyl releases of pioneering Filipino rock groups such as RJ and the Riots', the Juan Dela Cruz Band and Anakbayan, as well as submissions (on cassette tapes) of recordings from Manila's unsigned bands and independent artists. The earliest contributions were from groups such as Maria Cafra ("Kamusta Mga Kaibigan"/"How Are You, Friends?"), Petrified Anthem ("Drinking Wine"), Destiny ("A Taste Of Honey"), and the nascent Apolinario Mabini Hiking Society.

A mobile recording studio was set up by Alan Austria in 1974, using the station's 4-track tape recorder and mixing board, for "live-in-the-booth" recordings to facilitate the entries of contestants for one of its sponsors, RC Cola and its First National Battle of the Bands (produced by RC Cola's then COO, Cesare Syjuco). More than 200 new songs were said to have been recorded for the Pinoy Rock 'n' Rhythm show, and these entries were aired in succession through many weeks, as the participating bands worked their way into the elimination rounds. These demos paved the way for recording artists such as Florante, Heber Bartolome of Banyuhay, Johnny Alegre of Hourglass, Bob Aves of Destiny, and many others, who thrived prominently in the Philippine record industry during later years.

DZRJ's premises, the J&T Building along Magsaysay Boulevard in Santa Mesa, Manila, was the site for rock concerts which were organized by the station; first on the building's roof deck, and later in its open-air parking lot. The emergence of Pinoy Rock as a popular musical genre was the springboard for artists to emerge commercially, as their key recordings reached a wide listening public. The best examples of such artists and their hits are the Juan Dela Cruz Band ("Himig Natin"), Sampaguita ("Bonggahan"), Mike Hanopol ("Laki Sa Layaw"), and even Eddie Munji III ("Pinoy Jazz") and, of course, DZRJ's very own RJ Jacinto ("Muli").

The station's Pinoy rock scene, as well as non-rock pop hits, thus formed the basis of what is now known as Original Pinoy Music (OPM).

==== The Rock 'n' Roll Machine ====
DZRJ was also known for a cross-genre, album-oriented midnight show, called The Rock 'n' Roll Machine, hosted by Hoagy Pardo ("Cousin Hoagy'"), which provided late night listeners with entire sides of advance copies of LPs from the United States and the United Kingdom. Its early morning program opened to a rousing drumbeat from a Ventures song with a pre-recorded tape cartridge of Howlin' Dave announcing "Gising na, RJ na!" ("Wake up, it's RJ time!"). It also aired the packaged US chart show, Casey Kasem's American Top 40.

==== New frequency assignment ====
In November 1978, DZRJ-AM migrated to the current frequency of 810 kHz, in response to the frequency adjustments, owing to the adoption of the current 9 kHz spacing on AM radio stations in the Philippines implemented by the Geneva Frequency Plan of 1975, replacing the NARBA mandated 10 kHz AM radio spacing plan which was used from 1922 up to that time.

=== 1986–2010: The first iteration of Radyo Bandido ===
At the height of the People Power Revolution in late February 1986 that ousted then-sitting President Ferdinand Marcos, newscaster June Keithley and Fr. James Reuter, S.J. commandeered the DZRJ station, which they renamed Radyo Bandido (Outlaw Radio or Bandit Radio). This was after the facilities and transmitter of Keithley's home network, the Church-owned Radio Veritas, were shut down by the Marcos-loyal Armed Forces of the Philippines. Radyo Bandido broadcasts opened with former President Ramón Magsaysay's political jingle Mambo Magsaysay (composed by Raúl Manglapus), because it was also the theme music of the disabled Radio Veritas and thus enabled Keithley to clandestinely identify herself to listening protesters.

For her role in providing both information and morale to protesters during the Revolution, Keithley was awarded the Medal of the Legion of Honor by President Cory Aquino after the fall of the Marcos regime. The Radio Broadcast of the Philippine People Power Revolution, which includes broadcasts from DZRJ, is inscribed on the UNESCO Memory of the World Register, the official documentary heritage list of the United Nations.

To honor the station's key role in the 1986 Revolution, DZRJ AM was officially rebranded Radyo Bandido, and switching to a public service format. Meanwhile, the music format revived on FM as RJ 100.3, then later, RJ Underground Radio 105.9 (currently 105.9 True FM), as well as their flagship TV network RJ DigiTV. DZRJ is known for some veteran broadcasters such as Johnny Midnight and Art Borjal. Since 2004, it began airing news from the BBC World Service and the Voice of America. The PBA Games on Radio was moved to DZRJ-AM from DZSR in 2009. UAAP on Radio started on DZRJ-AM in 2010. Of note as well is DZRJ-AM's role during EDSA II in 2001 which led to the resignation of President Joseph Estrada.

=== 2010–2015: The Voice of the Philippines ===
With Radyo Bandido's popularity waning during the recent years, the management decided to launch a unique brand in June 2010. On July 19, it upgraded its transmitter facilities to 50,000 watts, with the old 10,000 watt transmitter being decommissioned. Radyo Bandido signed off for the last time on August 22.

On August 25, 2010, DZRJ launched its English-language broadcasts under the branding The Voice of the Philippines as a test broadcast, with its official launch on October 4, 2010. DZRJ was the only English-language AM station in Mega Manila during the existence. Its format consisted of news in English from the Philippine Star, the Voice of America and the BBC World Service, Lifestyle, Sports and Public Service. In September 2015, the same time the station launched the newest morning show The New Bandidos.

On June 7, 2016, Greco Belgica joined DZRJ and launched his program #GrecoLive. It was a widely accepted public service program that caters to overseas Filipino Workers and local issues. CJ Santos co-hosted #GrecoLive as Jack Logan.

=== 2015–2017: 8TriMedia era ===
On October 4, 2015, 8TriMedia Pro Inc. , a media firm owned by rice trader Jojo Soliman and veteran radio broadcaster Kaye Dacer (formerly from DZMM), transferred its programs and time-sharing operation from DWBL 1242. Coinciding with its move was the launch of a TeleRadyo format exclusively on Cablelink, where it was seen on Channel 7 as 8TriTV. 8TriMedia firm had previously occupied the 6:00 to 10:00 pm timeslot of ZOE Broadcasting-owned DZJV 1458 from April 2014 to March 2015 and the aforementioned DWBL from May to September that year.

Initially, 8TriMedia occupied DZRJ's 9 am to 7 pm timeslot before expanding to the full 21-hours on weekdays in November 2016 while retaining the overnight hook-up of the BBC World Service and station-produced programs (especially on weekends).

8TriMedia made use of the Radyo Bandido brand until late 2016 while DZRJ still retained the Voice of the Philippines brand when airing its in-house programs. During its tenure, DZJV's Daniel Castro remained as voice-over for station ID's, program teasers, and other on-air elements as had been the case with the previous stations where 8TriMedia served as tenant and content provider

In November 2017, the blocktimers' original studio in Seneca Plaza Bldg., Quezon City was damaged due to flooding brought by Tropical Storm Salome (Haikui). This prompted 8TriMedia's programs and personalities to use DZRJ's studio at the Ventures Building in Makati, until a new studio for the company was reconstructed. However, on December 5, 2017, DZRJ cancelled the blocktime agreement with 8TriMedia.

=== 2017–present: Return of Radyo Bandido ===
Logo of DZRJ-AM from 2017 to 2022

On December 5, 2017, DZRJ brought back the Radyo Bandido brand, with most of 8TriMedia's programs and radio personalities integrated into its programming.

==== Radyo Bandido TV ====
From June 6, 2018, some programs of Radyo Bandido began airing as a "TeleRadyo" format through RJ DigiTV after its affiliate 2nd Avenue ended its free TV broadcast due to the expiry of Solar Entertainment Corporation's airtime lease with the Jacintos. Plans for a separate "TeleRadyo" sub-channel on RJdigiTV carrying the AM station's video feed were also unveiled.

On September 16, 2019, DZRJ TeleRadyo began its initial test broadcast on an RJ DigiTV sub-channel, and it also became available via SkyCable Channel 224 in Metro Manila.

On October 15, 2019, the same standalone channel was formally launched as DZRJ RadioVision, reverting its cable and digital channel assignment on channel 29.03. Alongside this, DZRJ unveiled its new content.
