= RJ Jacinto =

Filipino musician and personality

Presidential Adviser for Telecommunications
- In office December 2, 2020 – June 30, 2022
- President: Rodrigo Duterte

Undersecretary for Government Digital Broadcast Television and the Digitization of the Entertainment Industry Sector
- In office May 26, 2020 – December 4, 2020
- President: Rodrigo Duterte
- Preceded by: Eliseo Rio Jr.
- Succeeded by: Ali Atienza

Presidential Adviser on Economic Affairs and Information Technology Communications
- In office July 14, 2016 – May 25, 2020
- President: Rodrigo Duterte

Vice Chairman of Flagship Projects
- In office 1994–1998
- President: Fidel V. Ramos

Personal details
- Born: Ramón Pereyra Jacinto; June 3, 1945 (age 81) Pasay, City of Greater Manila, Philippines
- Party: Lakas-CMD
- Spouse: Frannie Aguinaldo
- Children: 6
- Occupation: Singer, songwriter, producer, businessman

Ramón Pereyra Jacinto (born June 3, 1945), best known as RJ Jacinto or the mononym RJ, is a Filipino businessman, musician and radio TV personality. He previously served as Undersecretary for Government Digital Broadcast Television and the Digitization of the Entertainment Industry Sector in Department of Information and Communications Technology. He is also the founder and chairman of Philippine rock-and-roll radio station DZRJ and the Rajah Broadcasting Network.

== Education ==
Jacinto attended the Ateneo de Manila University and graduated with honors in Economics. To further his studies, he took up law at the University of Santo Tomas while working for his father's steel company, Iligan Integrated Steel Mills, Inc.

== Career ==
Jacinto became an entrepreneur at the age of 15, founding the first multi-track recording company in Asia. At the age of 17, Jacinto and his friends established his radio station in his parents' backyard. The establishment of the radio station with the call letters dzRJ, would eventually be an influential rock and roll station in the country.

By the age of 19, Jacinto began working at his family's Iligan Integrated Steel Mills, Inc. (IISMI), the Philippines' largest steel mill, as VP Purchasing and later as SVP Operations. His band RJ and the Riots disbanded in 1971.

During the Martial law period under Ferdinand Marcos, the Jacinto family's assets were forcibly seized and placed under military control and executives of the company were jailed with no charges filed. The sequestered assets included Jacinto's two radio stations. At that time, Jacinto was in the United States and opted to stay there in exile for 14 years to save himself from being jailed. During his exile, Jacinto recorded songs together with other Filipino musicians and secretly sent them to the Philippines for airplay. The songs "Muli" and "Don't Let Go" became hits but the composers and singers were not named in order to avoid military sanctions.

On March 5, 1986, Juan Ponce Enrile, who was then the Defense Minister, returned the radio stations and some of the Jacinto family's steel mills back to the Jacintos. DZRJ was finally transferred from military administration in June 1986 and Jacinto began to make DZRJ, the leader in retro wave by playing music from the 1950s, 1960s and 1970s.

Upon returning from exile from Martial Law, Jacinto established a string of businesses:

- UHF Television
- Home TV Shopping
- Non-collateral Consumer Finance
- American Style Bargain Stores like Price Club (now occupied by S&R Shopping), Save-A-Lot & Costco

He also owned Ventures Rural Bank, which he later sold and is now known as AMA Bank.

Through his show RJ Sunday Jam, he is claimed to be the first to establish "teleradyo" - a simulcast of radio on TV which was the model for ABS-CBN's DZMM TeleRadyo, the #1 AM radio station in the country.

In 1992, he ran and lost in the Philippine senatorial elections, placing 42nd overall under the Lakas–NUCD (top 24 candidates win seats).

=== Bistro RJ, RJ Bar and RJ Bistro ===
On July 25, 1986, Jacinto set up Bistro RJ, a rock and roll music lounge and restaurant located at Arnaiz Avenue, Makati, Metro Manila which became popular for those who were into singing and dancing. At the time, live bands traveled abroad to make a living and the night circuit in Manila depended on piano bars and discos. Jacinto decided to hire live bands to provide financial opportunities as well as to revive the night life in the Philippines through live music.

Bistro RJ was renamed RJ Bar in 1991. It relocated to the Mandarin Oriental Manila Hotel in 1997 and later to Gil Puyat Avenue and subsequently Jupiter Street, all in Makati, Metro Manila.

In 2010, RJ Bar was renamed RJ Bistro and relocated to the Dusit Thani Hotel Manila in Makati, Metro Manila. and in December 10 of the Same Year, RJ Bistro was re-opened at the Lower Level of the same hotel.

=== RJ Guitars ===
Jacinto developed an interest in music and he was particularly inclined to the guitar. RJ Guitars Store was launched in 1988 in Glorietta Mall (formerly Quad Mall), Makati. While performing in his bistro, Jacinto felt exasperated about switching between a Fender Jazzmaster and a Gibson Les Paul. He decided to approach the legendary Filipino luthier Rudy Discipulo to make a guitar versatile enough to produce all the sounds he needed. Impressed by Discipulo's workmanship, Jacinto embarked on putting up a guitar manufacturing business. At present, there are 20 RJ Guitar Centers in the Philippines, providing RJ Guitar models, and other musical instruments as well as distributing Taylor Guitars and other brands from abroad.

In 2017, he established RJ Bacchus Japanese Guitar Factory, in partnership with Japanese guitar manufacturer Deviser. The 1,150 square meter factory located in Dasmariñas, Cavite.

=== RJ Academy of Music ===
The RJ Academy of Music began in 1994 when RJ Guitar Center became the licensee of the Music Institute of Los Angeles, California.

=== Makati lot dispute with PNB ===
An 8,000-square-meter prime lot at the corner of Sen. Gil J. Puyat Avenue (Buendia) and Paseo de Roxas in Makati was the subject of a long-running legal dispute between Jacinto and the Philippine National Bank (PNB). Along with Tagaytay-located properties of his entity RJ Ventures Realty and Development Corp, the Supreme Court ruled that PNB has a claim over such property due to Jacinto defaulting on his real estate mortgage for said property.

== Presidential appointments ==
Jacinto served as Vice Chairman for the Presidential Committee on Flagship Programs and Projects under former President Fidel V. Ramos from March 22, 1995, to March 1, 1998.

Since 2008, Jacinto is president and CEO of Philcomsat Holdings Corporation, a subsidiary of Philippine Communications Satellite Corporation (PHILCOMSAT). He is also chairman of the board of directors and chairman of the executive committee of PHILCOMSAT.

On July 14, 2016, President Rodrigo Duterte appointed Jacinto as Presidential Adviser on Economic Affairs and Information Technology Communications with the rank of Undersecretary. During the 2016 presidential campaign of Duterte, Jacinto was among the celebrities who were actively supporting him. He created a campaign jingle for Duterte during his 2016 presidential campaign.

On May 22, 2020, Jacinto was appointed Undersecretary for Government Digital Broadcast Television and the Digitization of the Entertainment Industry Sector Department of Information and Communications Technology.

On November 25, 2020, Jacinto was again appointed by President Duterte as his Presidential Adviser for Telecommunications with the rank of Secretary.

=== Presidential citation ===
On June 23, 1998, Jacinto was awarded a Presidential Citation in recognition of the distinguished and exemplary service he rendered to the Philippines as presidential consultant of President Fidel V. Ramos from March 22, 1995, to March 1, 1998.

== Personal life ==
Jacinto is married to columnist and philanthropist, Frannie Aguinaldo. He was previously married to María Lourdes "Marilou" Tuason Arroyo, the sister of Mike Arroyo

== Discography ==
=== RJ & the Riots ===
- 1962: The Teenage Touch of R.J. and the Riots
- 1964: RJ & the Riots

=== Solo studio albums ===
- 1987: RJ, Back from Exile
- 1990: The Guitarman
- 1991: Giliw
- 1992: The Guitarman II
- 2014: Fine as Wine Instrumentals
- 2015: RJ Orig
- 2015: Swinging the Kundiman
- 2016: Romancing RJ
- 2017: Songs I Grew Up With
- 2019: Kundiman ni Guitarman
- 2020: KundiRock
- 2023: Bouncing the Standards
- 2024: Ampless Instrumentals

=== Extended plays ===
- 1992: Compact Series
- 2021: Studio Sessions 1
- 2021: Studio Sessions 2
- 2021: Studio Sessions 3
- 2022: Studio Sessions 4
- 2022: Studio Sessions 5
- 2022: Studio Sessions 6
- 2022: Studio Sessions 7
- 2022: Studio Sessions 8
- 2022: Studio Sessions 9
- 2022: Studio Sessions 10
- 2022: Studio Sessions 11

=== Live albums ===
- 1992: Live Adventures of RJ Vol. 1
- 2007: RJ Symphonic Rock

=== Christmas albums ===
- 1988: Pasko Na Naman
- 1990: Christmas with RJ
- 2015: Super Vintage Christmas Guitar Instrumentals

=== Collaborative albums ===
- 2012: RJ Duets

=== Compilations and other albums ===
- 1991: RJ Best of Original Hits
- 1999: The Ultimate RJ Bistro Collection Vol. 1
- 2000: The Ultimate RJ Bistro Collection Vol. 2
- 2005: The Very Best of RJ
- 2005: Rock & Roll Classics
- 2006: Muli

=== Collaborations ===
- 1994: Quantum Hit Series Vol. 1 (RJ Productions, formerly Quantum Music Corporation)
- 1994: Quantum Hit Series Vol. 2 (RJ Productions, formerly Quantum Music Corporation)
- 1996: Quantum Hit Series Vol. 4 (RJ Productions, formerly Quantum Music Corporation)

=== Singles ===
==== Original ====
- "Muli" / "Don't Let Go" (1978)
- "Sugat ng Puso" (1981)
- "Rising Sun" (1981)
- "Philippines, My Philippines" (1986)
- "Hele-Hele" (1987)
- "Hirap Makatulog" (1991)
- "Pilipinas" (1992)
- "Lubid" (1994)
- "Love Me Without Regrets" (1994)
- "Bolero" (1996)
- "Bulacan" (2006)
- "One and Only" (2006)
- "Pasko Na Naman" (1988; Re-recorded in 1993 and 2021)
- "Ngayon" (2010)
- "Ano Ka Ba" (2015)
- "Bakit Ba" (2016)
- "Magpaturok Ka Ba" (2021)
- "Paturok" (2021)
- "Corned Beef" (2023)

==== Covers ====
- "Constantly" (2012; duet with his best friend Jose Mari Chan & original by Cliff Richard
- "Without You" (2023; original by Badfinger Band)
- "Moon River" (2023; original by Audrey Hepburn & also covered by Andy Williams & former teen star singer & actor Daniel Padilla)
- "Manila" (2012; original by Hotdog band & also covered by Side A Band & Eraserheads & also a duet version with the original Hotdog singer songwriter Dennis Garcia)
- ”Rosanna (2012; original by Toto Band & also a duet versions with former Toto Band member Steve Lutkhanter

=== Music videos ===
- "Constantly" (2012)
- "Presyo" (Feat. former Eraserheads frontman Ely Buendia, 2012)
