= Rajah Broadcasting Network =

Philippine media company

Rajah Broadcasting Network (RJ Broadcasting Group)
- Type: Privately held company
- Industry: Broadcast television and radio network
- Founded: 1963 (radio broadcasts); May 3, 1993 (television broadcasts)
- Founder: Ramon "RJ" Jacinto
- Headquarters: Ventures I Bldg., Makati Ave. cor. Gen. Luna St., Makati, Metro Manila, Philippines
- Area served: Nationwide
- Key people: Ramon "RJ" Jacinto (Chairman Emeritus); Erlinda Legaspi (Vice President); Beatriz "Bea" Jacinto-Colamonici (Senior Vice President); Nadine Jacinto (Executive Producer For RJ Productions)
- Parent: RJ Broadcasting Group
- Website: www.rjplanet.com

RJTV
- Type: Broadcast television network
- Branding: RJ DigiTV
- Country: Philippines
- Headquarters: Ventures I Bldg., Makati Ave. cor. Gen. Luna St., Barangay Poblacion, Makati, Metro Manila
- Broadcast area: Nationwide
- Owner: Rajah Broadcasting Network
- Launch date: May 3, 1993
- Picture format: NTSC 16:9 (1080p HDTV)
- Official website: www.rjplanet.com
- Language: English; Filipino
- Replaced: 2nd Avenue

Rajah Broadcasting Network, Inc. (which stands for RAmon JAcinto Holdings) is a Philippine television and radio network owned by guitarist-singer-businessman Ramon "RJ" Jacinto. The network's studio headquarters is located at Ventures I Building, Makati Avenue cor. General Luna Street, Barangay Poblacion, Makati, Metro Manila.

== History ==
The RJ Group was founded by Ramon "RJ" Jacinto. His grandfather, Dr. Nicanor Jacinto, founded the Philippine Bank of Commerce, which was the first Filipino-owned private bank, and RJ's father, Don Fernando P. Jacinto founded the steel industry in the country—Jacinto Steel and Iligan Integrated Steel Mills, which are now known as National Steel.

At the age of 15, RJ Enterprises pioneered in multi-track recording in the Philippines, utilizing the first three multi-track Ampex in Southeast Asia.

After the EDSA People Power Revolution on February 25, 1986, RJ came home from exile on March 5, 1986, and the new democratic regime returned the family properties and his radio stations. Those assets were seized and operated by the military for 14.5 years.

RJ's radio station, DZRJ, became the voice of the democratic revolution, known as Radyo Bandido, and was the recipient of freedom awards after that. Its old format was carried over to 100.3 FM.

RJ immediately expanded his radio stations and started many businesses after that, making up for lost time. This includes a nationwide network of 11 total FM and AM radio stations and a TV station, RJ DigiTV, which is carried nationwide by the cable networks, and in Metro Manila via Digital Terrestrial Television.

Today, the RJ Group is composed of broadcasting, entertainment, and music store enterprises.

=== Franchise Renewal ===
On October 9, 2018, in accordance with current constitutional rules, it was granted a 25-year legislative franchise under Republic Act No. 8104 that was approved by the House of Representatives and by the Senate. On August 31, 2019, Rajah Broadcasting Network, Inc.'s franchise to construct, install, operate and maintain commercial radio and TV broadcasting stations was renewed by virtue of Republic Act No. 11414 signed by then-President Rodrigo Duterte.

== TV stations ==
=== RJTV ===
==== Digital ====
Branding	Callsign	Channel	Frequency	Power	Type	Location
RJTV Manila	DZRJ	29	563.143 MHz	2.5 kW	Originating	Metro Manila

==== Cable ====
Provider	Channel	Coverage
Cablelink	102	Metro Manila
Sky Cable	19	Metro Manila
Cignal	28	Nationwide
G Sat	68	Nationwide
SatLite	29	Nationwide
LeyteNet	18	Leyte
Parasat	112	Regional

== Radio stations ==
=== AM Stations ===
Branding	Callsign	Frequency	Power	Coverage
Radyo Bandido	DZRJ	810 kHz	50 kW	Mega Manila

=== FM Stations ===
Branding	Callsign	Frequency	Power	Location
RJFM Manila	DZRJ	100.3 MHz	25 kW	Metro Manila
RJFM Baguio	DWDJ	91.1 MHz	5 kW	Baguio
RJFM Tuguegarao	DWRJ	96.5 MHz	5 kW	Tuguegarao
RJFM Puerto Princesa	DZJR	99.1 MHz	5 kW	Puerto Princesa
RJFM Iloilo	DYNJ	98.3 MHz	10 kW	Iloilo City
RJFM Bacolod	DYFJ	99.9 MHz	10 kW	Bacolod
RJFM Cebu	DYRJ	100.3 MHz	20 kW	Cebu City
RJFM Cagayan de Oro	DXRJ	88.5 MHz	10 kW	Cagayan de Oro
RJFM Iligan	DXQJ	88.7 MHz	5 kW	Iligan
RJFM Davao	DXDJ	100.3 MHz	20 kW	Davao City

== Programming ==
=== Radyo Bandido TV ===
Radyo Bandido TV is a Tagalog-language news/talk channel of Rajah Broadcasting Network. The channel predominantly airs simulcasts of DZRJ 810 AM programs. The channel launched on September 16, 2019. Radyo Bandido TV started its official broadcasting on October 15, 2019.

=== Rock MNL ===
Rock MNL is a music and entertainment cable/terrestrial television channel operated by Rajah Broadcasting Network. It was launched on September 1, 2019.

== Other assets ==
=== Divisions ===
- RJ Group of Companies

=== Films and studios ===
- RJ Academy of Music
- RJ Productions
- RJ Recording Studios
- RJ Guitar Center
- RJ Bistro
- RJ Shop
- RJ Electronics

=== Other Properties ===
- Jacinto Color Steel Inc.

== Productions and affiliates ==
- The Philippine Star
- Daily Tribune
- VOA
- BBC
- Jesus is Our Shield Worldwide Ministries (Oras ng Himala)
- TV Maria

=== Defunct ===
- 2nd Avenue
- 8TriMedia Broadcasting Network
