= Aksyon (TV program) =

2010–20 Philippine defunct flagship television news show of TV5

- The primetime edition titlecard from August 14, 2017 to March 16, 2020
- Genre: News broadcasting Public service
- Created by: TV5 Network, Inc. (then ABC Development Corporation)
- Directed by: Dodge Dillague (2010–11); Benedict Carlos (2011–20)
- Presented by: Luchi Cruz-Valdes; Ed Lingao
- Narrated by: Paolo Bediones (2010–11); Erwin Tulfo (2011–17); Ed Lingao (2018–20)
- Theme music composer: Jimmy Antiporda
- Opening theme: "Aksyon" (2017 arrangement)
- Country of origin: Philippines
- Original language: Tagalog

Production
- Executive producers: Paul Padua; Grace Navarro
- Production locations: TV5 Studio B, Novaliches, Quezon City, Metro Manila, Philippines (2010–13); Studio 4 (News5 Studio), TV5 Media Center, Reliance, Mandaluyong City, Metro Manila, Philippines (2013–20)
- Camera setup: Multiple-camera setup
- Running time: 30 minutes (2010, 2012–13); 45 minutes (2010–11) (2011–12, 2013–14); 60 minutes (2011, 2014–17); 90 minutes (2017–20)
- Production company: News5

Original release
- Network: TV5
- Release: April 5, 2010 – March 16, 2020

Related
- Sapul sa Singko; Good Morning Club; Frontline Pilipinas; Gud Morning Kapatid

Aksyon (transl. Action) is a Philippine television news broadcasting show that aired on TV5. Originally anchored by Paolo Bediones, Erwin Tulfo and Cheryl Cosim, it premiered on April 5, 2010, on the network's evening line up replacing Balita Ngayon and TEN: The Evening News. The show concluded on March 16, 2020. Luchi Cruz-Valdes and Ed Lingao served as the final anchors. It was replaced by Frontline Pilipinas in its timeslot.

== Background ==
The name of the newscast is based on News5's slogan Higit sa Balita, Aksyon! (transl. Beyond the News, Action!).

== History ==
=== 2010–2014: As a primetime newscast ===
Aksyon premiered on April 5, 2010, at 9:00 PM with Paolo Bediones and Cheryl Cosim as its first anchors. The news program used a touch-screen television called Aksyon Board. It is the first local newscast to report via live-pack in contrast to the OB Vans used by its competitors. There is also a round-up news update called Aksyon Ngayon.

On October 25, 2010, Erwin Tulfo, host of the police-report-and-public-service-segment Aksyon Metro, joined the newscast and their time slot was moved to 6:00 PM, then 5:45 PM, and then 5:30 PM serving as a former lead-in to the network's former variety shows Willing Willie/Wil Time Bigtime. On that same day, the newscast also introduced a new augmented virtuality set and OBB. On November 8, 2010, the newscast began its simulcast on the then-newly launched Radyo5 92.3 News FM.

On February 18, 2011, Paolo Bediones left the newscast for Aksyon JournalisMO, leaving Tulfo and Cosim as the main anchors, with Shawn Yao (showbiz and weather) and Makata Tawanan (Makata's Super Bidyo) as segment anchors. The newscast was also given new weekday graphics and new virtual background while starting its simulcast on AksyonTV on February 21, 2011.

On June 6, 2011, the newscast added a news desk while updating their graphics and title card. "Makata's Super Bidyo", a video features segment, was reformatted with its new name "Makatang Gala" (transl. The Stray Poet), where Makata Tawanan goes on streets to bring information to its viewers. By July 25, 2011, Lourd de Veyra joined the newscast, hosting his weather-and-trivia-segment "Weather or Not", which includes relevant and historical bites after de Veyra presents the weather.

On February 6, 2012, Aksyon divided into two parts, Metro Aksyon focused on police reports around Metro Manila, and Jun Sabayton hosted "Anong Problema Mo", while remaining 30 minutes is the national and other news. It then became an emergency protocol when its former lead-in public service program, T3: Kapatid, Sagot Kita, of the Tulfo brothers was given a long-term suspension by the Movie and Television Review and Classification Board following numerous controversies that hounded the show. By February 20, 2012, Aksyon modified its newsdesk and updating its graphics and title card.

On January 7, 2013, Aksyon re-expand its time to 45 minutes, from 6:00 PM to 6:45 PM. It then launched a new segment entitled Happy News, a segment that focuses on light-hearted topics (e.g., travel, food, festivals, etc.) that reflects the Filipino's happy spirit. It has become the newscast's closing segment since its launch.

In June 2013, when Sports5 did not renew a blocktime agreement with IBC to air the AKTV sports block due to high blocktime costs and low ratings, the newscast's simulcast on AksyonTV was limited to give way for the primetime sports programming on AksyonTV.

On October 14, 2013, along with the launch of News5's primetime block KBO: Karunungan, Balita, Opinyon, Aksyon updated its newsdesk, graphics and title card. Later, Aksyon became a 1-hour newscast from 6:00 PM to 7:00 PM.

On December 23, 2013, Aksyon, along with other News5 programs, transferred from its former TV5 Studio Complex in Novaliches, Quezon City to a larger TV5 Media Center in Mandaluyong.

In March 2014, the newscast has two new segments. Caught in Aksyon focuses on issues – accidents, violation, and wrongful activities caught on CCTV Cameras. Makatarugan Ba? is about the issues that one or more individuals has a violations in a law, as explained by Atty. Mel Sta. Maria.

=== 2014–2017: Expansion ===
On July 21, 2014, Aksyon expanded its newscast by revamping four separate newscasts: Aksyon sa Umaga (replacing Good Morning Club), Aksyon sa Tanghali (replacing Balitaang Tapat) back-to-back with T3 :Enforced (after moving to noontime slot), the reformatted flagship Aksyon Prime, and Aksyon Tonite (replacing Pilipinas News due to man-polling of its anchors like Cherie Mercado and Jove Francisco).

On October 21, 2014, Aksyon Prime cut its runtime to 45 minutes whenever PBA games are at hand on weeknights. Reaksyon once again had a separate program after Aksyon Tonite.

In June 2015, all Aksyon newscasts updated their graphic packages in full 16:9 presentation, which is currently used by major television networks in the U.S., Australia, most of Europe and other countries. The studio set was also renovated and expanded to accommodate an LED screen at the back of the studio with a desk for the anchor. This also the first time that Aksyon sa Umaga doesn't have a separate studio set.

On July 20, 2015, all Aksyon newscasts rescaled their graphics to allow TV5 to fit the newscast to the conventional 4:3 broadcast format. However, the letterboxing output shall remain to be used for some circumstances (such as events like President Noynoy Aquino's 2015 State of the Nation Address where the originating source only applies to 16:9 widescreen TVs).

After Shawn Yao's controversy on one of her live reports on TV and before anchoring a program on Bloomberg TV Philippines (and later One News), she left her segment in Aksyon and replaced permanently by MJ Marfori.

On January 18, 2016, Tulfo replaced Lourd de Veyra as one of the anchors/hosts of Aksyon sa Umaga. Erwin and Martin's tandem in early morning television show made a return after Good Morning Sir; their radio program Punto Asintado became a segment again in Aksyon sa Umaga. Erwin Tulfo is still one of the anchors of Aksyon Prime.

On February 15, 2016, Aksyon sa Tanghali introduced Balitaserye, a five-minute crime investigation segments, anchored by Gary de Leon.

On April 18, 2016, Cheryl Cosim and TV5's resident legal analyst Atty. Mel Sta. Maria replaced Martin Andanar and Erwin Tulfo as anchors/hosts of Aksyon sa Umaga. This is Cheryl Cosim's return as a morning anchor/host after Good Morning Club, though she still anchored Aksyon Tonite at that time. This is also Atty. Mel Sta. Maria's first time to become a main anchor of a television newscast. Public service format was added on his arrival. Before this, he already became part of a segment in some newscasts of News5 where he gave similar advice to that which he gave on his radio program Relasyon.

In April 2016, after many years of anchoring various newscasts, this is the first time that Martin Andanar doesn't have any television-produced programs except the continuous rerun of Crime Klasik and as host of Punto Asintado from Radyo5. He then focused on his radio and podcast career, while continuing his job as the official voice over of all News5 platforms: Radyo5, AksyonTV (except Sports5 programs), N5E, and News5 programs on TV5. But in June 2016, it was revealed that Andanar was appointed as the new head of PCOO (Presidential Communication Operations Office) under the Duterte administration, which supervises the government's media infrastructure.

In May 2016, after the Bilang Pilipino 2016 election coverage, all Aksyon newscasts continued to utilize the new studio with a large LED. Unlike ABS-CBN News, and GMA News who came back in their respective newscast studios after the coverage, News5 considered the Election studio as their new studio for all of its editions. However, 4:3 graphics, title cards, and OBB didn't change. There was also a time that Sports5 used the studio for the announcement of the Gilas Pilipinas line-up prior to the FIBA Olympic Qualifying Tournament in July (with the Philippines as one of the host countries).

On July 15, 2016, Cherie Mercado left the newscast after six years with TV5 (from Aksyon Weekend, Aksyon JournalisMO, Pilipinas News, to Aksyon sa Tanghali), after she was appointed as the Press Officer and spokesperson to the newly created Department of Transportation. She, went to a private life with her family after resigning from her post in May the following year. In 2018, she was hired by CNN Philippines (a local franchise of CNN which, ironically, became TV5's former partner in sharing international news content via AksyonTV's defunct CNN Konek, currently as RPTV) to anchor the late evening edition of Newsroom, replacing Mitzi Borromeo who'll leave the channel to pursue an advance degree in college.

Following her departure, Aksyon was downgraded to single-presenter format by August 1. Cheryl Cosim retained her role to the morning newscast, but she left her co-presenter of Aksyon Tonite Ed Lingao, who went solo for a week until Roices Naguit took over Cosim's vacated anchor's chair on the Late-Night edition in the height of the network's coverage to the 2016 Summer Olympics in Rio de Janeiro, Brazil. More than two months later, on October 17, the edition's segment anchor Lia Cruz and former Aksyon sa Tanghali segment anchor Marga Vargas are named as new rotating co-anchors to Lingao. The primetime edition however, was spared from these changes and continued to be co-anchored by Valdez and Tulfo during the time.

On December 19, 2016, the newscast's graphic package gained rounded edges (in exception in the flipper) with orange as the standard color. It was initially used in the morning and early evening editions before implementing on the rest of the newscast. The color is now similar with their Cignal business channel Bloomberg TV Philippines.

On January 9, 2017, Aksyon Prime extended its runtime every Mondays, Tuesdays and Thursdays to 75 minutes, with Aksyon sa Tanghali extending its runtime to a full hour seven days before the main edition. However, Aksyon Prime was scaled back to 60 minutes by February 23.

On March 31, 2017, Erwin Tulfo and News5 reached an agreement for the former to leave Aksyon Prime. replaced by Ed Lingao, on April 3, 2017, Joining Luchi Cruz-Valdes

Series of possible budget cuts forced Aksyon sa Umaga to reduce its airing time to 75 minutes from June 5; followed by Aksyon Prime on July 3, when it shortened its airing time to its original 45 minutes. As a compromise for the latter, however, News5 offered a separate online streaming on News5 Everywhere and News5's Facebook Live, where it can continue to run beyond its television broadcast. The said extension was discontinued months later.

=== 2017–2020: Reformat and major changes made by ESPN5's launch ===
New soundtrack, openers, title cards and transition graphics (except Aksyon sa Umaga) were refreshed across all editions by August 14, 2017, replacing its 2014 version. The morning edition also replaced the AksyonTV theme with the new Aksyon soundtrack.

On September 4, 2017, Aksyon sa Umaga reduced its airtime from 75 minutes to 60 minutes to give way to some programming changes within the network.

On October 12, 2017, TV5 announced its partnership agreement between the network and U.S.-based sports television network ESPN, who returned to Philippine television after a 5-year long hiatus. Thus the former Sports5 rebranded as ESPN5 a day after, during the coverage of Game 1 of the 2017 PBA Governor's Cup Finals between the Barangay Ginebra San Miguel and the Meralco Bolts. The new sports deal showed drastic changes within News5 and Aksyon: Aksyon sa Umaga was axed for good on November 3 to give way for the upcoming ESPN U.S.' primetime programming simulcast overnight. This ended Cheryl Cosim's role as the main anchor of a News5 newscast after 7 years, although she continues radio duties at Radyo5 as well as filling-in for Cruz-Valdes on the primetime edition. Weekend Aksyon News Alert bulletins were also axed as part of the sports division's expansion. Also, since November 6, during daylight saving time, Aksyon sa Tanghali adjusted its timeslot to 12:30 PM, every Monday, Tuesday, & Friday (to accommodate live coverage of the US National Football League) with a more public service focus along with reading the day's Main Headlines. Aksyon Tonite also cutback its airtime to 15 minutes by November 6. Presenter changes in the newscast also occurred, as Lia Cruz left the newscast three days earlier to join ESPN5's new on air talents, while Marga Vargas moved back to Aksyon sa Tanghali a week after; leaving Ed Lingao as the main solo presenter for the newscast.

Weeks after these changes, News5 chief Luchi Cruz-Valdes made an indefinite absence on Aksyon Prime. Ed Lingao and Cheryl Cosim temporarily replaced Luchi Cruz-Valdes in the newscast. Cosim served as the main anchor of the primetime edition from its inception In 2010 until 2014. While Lingao is on the primetime edition, News5 correspondent Maricel Halili took Lingao's post as sit-in anchor for Aksyon Tonite.

On December 11, 2017, the newscast had a minor change on their studio set-up and a newsdesk, which was previously used by now-defunct News5 program Reaksyon. The newscast also shares its set with SportsCenter Philippines of ESPN5 and The Big Story of Bloomberg TV Philippines (before it was moved to newly launched One News studio as the newscast was relaunched in the news channel). Aksyon Tonite also moved its timeslot at 11:00 PM to also give way to the said sports newscast. The said edition also re-extended its broadcast by 15 minutes.

On January 10, 2018, Aksyon Prime reduced airtime by 15 minutes on a PBA game day. This is due to adjustment of the PBA broadcast schedule which starts at 4:30 PM, on Wednesdays and Fridays. The runtime remains the same for the non-PBA game days.

On March 21, 2018, the noontime and primetime edition began airing on weekday mornings at 5:00 AM as a replay telecast, serving as the morning timeslot formerly occupied by Aksyon sa Umaga.

During the third week of April, Aksyon sa Tanghali was given an SPG (Strong Parental Guidance) rating by the MTRCB due to its public service segments profane nature. The rating also includes the news segments of the said edition.

On July 2, 2018, after her almost 7 months of absence, Aksyon Prime main anchor Luchi Cruz-Valdes returns in the newscast, joining Ed Lingao, who serves as one of the sit-in presenters while she was on her leave. Meanwhile, another sit-in anchor Cheryl Cosim made a comeback to Aksyon Tonite as main anchor. Cosim permanently replaced Lingao, who also been her former co-anchor in the late-night edition.

On January 14, 2019, upon the rebranding of AksyonTV to 5 Plus, and later One Sports, Aksyon Prime's simulcast on the channel was axed to give way to the channel's repositioning as an all-sports channel. However, the audio simulcast on Radyo5 remains intact, with added TV presence on a standalone Cignal channel of the same name, which is also aired on selected UHF free TV stations run by the radio station's owner, Nation Broadcasting Corporation.

On February 11, 2019, Aksyon Tonite moved its timeslot at 10:30 PM, to give way for the special program as part of News5's coverage of the 2019 Philippine midterm elections, Aplikante sa Senado.

On February 18, 2019, Aksyon Primetime began simulcasting on One PH, a "Teleradyo" channel of Radyo5, on Cignal TV channel 6. Four days later, News5 announced that Aksyon Tonite will be replaced by a rebroadcast of The Big Story, the flagship newscast of 5's sister English news channel One News starting March 4.

On July 15, 2019, Aksyon Prime began airing a replay once again at 6:15 AM every weekday morning. It serves as a replacement for the timeslot formerly occupied by Aksyon sa Umaga and the Kids on 5 block. The replay once again ended after a month. It was replaced by a simulcast of Radyo5's Morning Calls.

On September 23, 2019, Aksyon Prime re-extends its broadcast to 60 minutes during non-PBA game days. In accordance with the changes, Aksyon airs at 6:00 PM every Monday, Tuesday, and Thursday. Its PBA game day timeslot remains unchanged. These changes were brought about by TV5's expansion of its news content through programs from sister station One PH; like its newscast service One Balita and late night talk show Wag Po!. Weeks prior to the change, Aksyon Prime had already reintroduced their online-only extension on News5 Always On.

In November 2019, Aksyon sa Tanghali and Aksyon Prime brought the 2019 Southeast Asian Games telecast in their respective newscast.

=== Cancellation ===
On March 16, 2020, a day before the Enhanced Community Quarantine in Luzon due to the COVID-19 pandemic, Aksyon sa Tanghali and Aksyon Prime aired their final newscasts. They were later replaced by One News Now as TV5's provisional programming.

On March 8, 2025, all editions of Aksyon's successor Frontline Pilipinas (which launched on October 5, 2020, except for News5 Alerts until June 8, 2025) used the former's theme soundtrack from 2010 to 2017 that was composed by Jimmy Antiporda throughout their broadcasts for unknown reason. The same thing also applies to Pasada Balita segment of Gud Morning Kapatid as of March 10.

== Final editions ==
=== Aksyon (Primetime edition) ===
==== Start time differences ====
The primetime edition is promoted to air at 6:30 PM on weeknights, with some exceptions. In almost every PBA game day, the newscast would start at or after 6:30 PM on 5 to allow the afternoon PBA game to end with the final score of the match. Start time is also subjected to change outside PBA games, only if necessary.

==== Final presenters ====
- Luchi Cruz-Valdes (2014–20)
- Ed Lingao (2017–20)

==== Segment presenters ====
- Lourd de Veyra (2011–20, Aksyon Weather and Word of the Lourd)
- MJ Marfori (2014–20, Celebrity Aksyon)
- Lyn Olavario (2018–20, SportsCenter sa Aksyon)

==== Former main presenters ====
- Paolo Bediones (2010–11)
- Erwin Tulfo (2010–17)
- Cheryl Cosim (2010–14)

==== Former segment presenters ====
- Paloma (2010–11, Showbiz Aksyon)
- Shawn Yao (2011–14, Showbiz Aksyon)
- Atty. Mel Sta. Maria (2014, Makatarungan Ba?)
- Chiqui Roa-Puno (2014–15, Aksyon Sports)
- Vic Garcia (2017, Ano ang Aksyon mo?)
- Laila Chikadora (2017–18, Happy News)
- Renz Ongkiko (2017–18, Sportscenter sa Aksyon)

==== Segments ====
- Aksyon Weather
- Celebrity Aksyon
- Foreign News
- Happy News
- SportsCenter sa Aksyon
- Word of the Lourd (Opinion)

=== Aksyon sa Tanghali (Noontime edition) ===
Aksyon sa Tanghali, an afternoon edition of Aksyon, aired on TV5 from July 21, 2014 to March 16, 2020, replacing Balitaang Tapat and was replaced by Frontline Express. The one-hour midday edition of the newscast is aired Weekdays from 12:30 to 1:30 pm, and is presented by Raffy Tulfo (who also hosts his Ipa-Raffy Tulfo Mo segment (formerly called as Itimbre Mo Kay Tulfo), a spin-off from Wanted sa Radyo) with Marga Vargas presenting news segment Balita 1.2.3.. This edition always changes the schedule since the launch, due to blocktime programming or competing with other noontime newscasts. In 2018, it holds the reputation of being the only SPG-rated newscast in the country due to its public service format which they are featuring some sensitive complaints, and profanity which cannot be censored in a live program. During daylight time changes from November–December, in order to accommodate NFL games, the show airs at 12:30 pm to 1:30 pm instead.

==== Format changes ====
On November 6, 2017, this edition has largely abandoned its newscast format and adopted a public service format, which occasionally serves as extension of Wanted sa Radyo. However, in occasions that Tulfo is absent, Aksyon sa Tanghali reverts to its original newscast format, anchored by rotating News5 correspondents.

On September 10, 2018, a new title card was released for the noontime edition presenting the public service and news.

==== Public service segments ====
Aside from Ipa-Raffy Tulfo Mo segment, two additional segments have been included in the newscast. The first segment, named OFW Alert, is a public service for Overseas Filipino Workers or OFW, and the second segment, named Raffy Tulfo in Aksyon, is a public service through social media, and is about uploaded videos that show unexpected events or wrongful activities happening in the community or on the road.

Tulfo is the only news presenter with the most segments in a newscast. In his three segments, it focuses on public service for Walk-In Complainants, Overseas Filipino Workers, and Uploaded Videos in Social Media that shows wrongful activities in the community.

The main presenter sitting comfortably in a news desk in the studio. Respondents and interviewees are video taped while they are on the discussion with him. A straight forward, hard hitting line of questioning is present throughout all the segments. The segments regularly emphasizes no nonsense approach and interrogation, sometimes laced with profanity.

==== Reading Top Stories in Short Minutes ====
Despite each cases is taking several minutes of discussion, it still remains a newscast by delivering and reading some national, community, and weather news of the day in the segment called Balita 1.2.3. presented by Marga Vargas.

==== Final presenter ====
- Raffy Tulfo (2014–20)

==== Segment presenters ====
- Marga Vargas (2014–16; 2017–20, Balita 1.2.3.)
- Hannibal Talete (2016–20, Aksyon sa Kalsada)
- Roda Magnaye (2016–20, One Balita's Aksyon Center, Showbiz Bulaga)

==== Former main presenter ====
- Cherie Mercado (2014–16)

==== Former segment presenters ====
- Jannie Alipo-on (2015–16, Celebrity Aksyon, Kwentanong, and Traffic Update)
- Atty. Mel Sta. Maria (2014–15, May K Ka)
- Dr. Edinell Calvario (2014–15, Healing Galing)
- Laila Chikadora (2014–16, Aksyon sa Kalsada and Diskarteng Pinoy)
- Jun Sabayton (2015, Bayaw ng Bayan)
- Gary De Leon (2016, Balita Serye)

==== Final segments ====
===== Public service segments =====
- Ipa-Raffy Tulfo Mo (for Walk-in complainants)
- OFW Alert (for Overseas Filipino Workers)
- Raffy Tulfo in Aksyon (for Uploaded Videos in Social Media that shows wrongful activities)

===== News segments =====
- Balita 1.2.3. (Top Stories)
- Aksyon Weather

===== Other segments =====
- Aksyon sa Kalsada
- Hula-Who
- Showbiz Bulaga
- Viral Video of the Day

== Correspondents ==
Aside from reporting on Aksyon, the following correspondents occasionally file reports for Radyo5 92.3 News FM as well as Cignal TV's satellite TV news channels One News and One PH.

- Marlene Alcaide
- Ryan Ang
- Gem Avanceña^{[1]}
- Jen Calimon
- Carlo Castillo
- Naomi Dayrit
- Jenny Dongon
- Marianne Enriquez
- Zony Esguerra
- Dindo Flora
- Shyla Francisco^{[2]}
- Maricel Halili
- Gary de Leon
- Romel Lopez
- Maeanne Los Baños
- Patricia Mangune
- MJ Marfori
- Faith del Mundo
- Justinne Punsalang
- Roices Naguit-Sibal
- Lyn Olavario^{[3]}
- Renz Ongkiko^{[3]}
- Laila Pangilinan
- Gerard de la Peña
- Bim Santos^{[2]}
- Hannibal Talete
- Faye Tobias
- Dale de Vera
- Bev Verdera
- Greg Gregorio
- JC Cosico
- Kari Cator
- Ria Fernandez
- Jennifer Reyes

Note
^{1} Absorbed from News5 Davao/Aksyon Dabaw
^{2} Full-time correspondent for One News
^{3} Also a correspondent for One Sports's SportsCenter Philippines

== Regional and affiliate versions / adaptations ==
Aksyon also had three regional versions: Aksyon Bisaya, a late afternoon regional newscast aired on TV5 Cebu, launched on July 18, 2011, following the station's launch in Cebu;, Aksyon Leyte launched on 2010 later became Balita ha Singko aired on TV5 Tacloban hosted by Bob Abellanosa and Aksyon Dabaw, which was launched on May 5, 2014, on TV5 Davao. These were the only regional editions that TV5 managed to produce, since they did not have a regional newscast for years in the network's history.

However, On September 8, 2016, the two regional newscasts were cancelled due to cost-cutting measures by the network to sustain the day-by-day operations of these regional stations. Although the newscast was ended, the reporters and cameramen were remaining employed and they will continue to give reports for all national Aksyon newscasts and for Radyo5.

Although it didn't consolidate with Aksyon, Golden Broadcast Professionals DXGB-11 Zamboanga, a TV5 affiliate, adopted the soundtrack of the newscast for the station's flagship Dateline Zamboanga which its only the 2014 version.

=== Previous regional newscasts ===
- Aksyon Bisaya (TV5 Channel 21 Cebu)
- Aksyon Dabaw (TV5 Channel 2 Davao)

== Hourly news updates ==
Aksyon has hourly update spin-offs on television and radio.

=== Aksyon Alert ===
Formerly known as Aksyon Ngayon and Aksyon News Alert, the news bulletin of TV5 airs every morning and afternoon on weekdays (formerly aired every weekends), delivering the top stories of the hour. it aired from April 5, 2010 to March 15, 2020, replaced by One News Now (from March 16, 2020 to October 4, 2020) and News5 Alerts (from October 5, 2020 onwards).

==== Presenters ====
- Patricia Mangune
- Marlene Alcaide
- Maricel Halili
- Mae Ann Los Baños
- Roices Naguit-Peek
- Renz Ongkiko
- Gerard de la Peña
- JC Cosico
- Gary de Leon
- Carlo Castillo
- Ed Lingao
- Cheryl Cosim
- Naomi Dayrit

== Former editions ==
=== Aksyon JournalisMO ===
Aksyon JournalisMO, roughly translated as "Action: Your Journalism" (JournalisMO is a portmanteau of journalismo and mo, Filipino words meaning journalism and your, respectively), was the flagship late night news program broadcast by TV5. Originally anchored by Martin Andanar, Cherie Mercado, and Jove Francisco, it aired on TV5 from October 25, 2010 to February 17, 2012, replacing TEN: The Evening News and was replaced by Pilipinas News. Simulcast on AksyonTV and on the radio through Radyo 92.3 News FM in Mega Manila, the program is broadcast Monday to Friday from 10:45 p.m. to 11:15 p.m. (PST). The newscast is based on News5's Facebook fan page JournalisMO. In JournalisMO, citizens can express their opinions on the different issues of the country. Paolo Bediones, Mercado and Francisco served as the final anchors.

==== Final presenters ====
- Paolo Bediones (2011–12)
- Cherie Mercado (2010–12)
- Jove Francisco (2010–12; Side TRACKED segment presenter)
- Manu Sandejas (2011–12; Aksyon Weather segment presenter)
- Claudine Trillo (2011–12; Aksyon Weather segment presenter)
- Lou Garcia (2011–12; Showbiz Eklavu segment presenter)

==== Former anchors ====
- Martin Andanar (2010–11)

=== Aksyon Weekend ===
Aksyon's weekend edition, then called Aksyon Weekend, premiered on April 10, 2010 at 5:00 pm, co-anchoring the weekend edition were Cherie Mercado, Jove Francisco and Martin Andanar, all final anchors of Aksyon's predecessor, TEN: The Evening News. Mercado, pregnant when the weekend edition first aired, when she got gave birth to her child, she was replaced by Amelyn Veloso, Naomi Dayrit, and then Maricel Halili, when she was the permanent replacement for Mercado. The weekend edition, along with Tutok Tulfo was moved to late nights in October 30, 2010 to make way for the pilot episodes of Willing Willie. Being absent on his last five weeks, Andanar was pulled out of the newscast to anchor the late-night newscast Aksyon JournalisMO in October 2010.

In October 2010, Andanar was replaced on Aksyon Weekend by his co-host on the weekday morning program Sapul sa Singko, Atty. Mike Templo. He joined Halili and Francisco, who remained in the weekend newscast although he was also assigned to the late night newscast. The weekend edition was split into Aksyon Sabado and Aksyon Linggo.

On August 5, 2012, Aksyon Sabado/Linggo made its final broadcast and was replaced by Pilipinas News Weekend. from August 11, 2012 to July 13, 2014.

On January 26, 2013, the weekend edition returned on air. But this time, it is now being anchored by Raffy Tulfo and Grace Lee. And it is being aired on Saturdays only because of the weekend edition of Pilipinas News which is aired every Saturday and Sunday around midnight, with Aksyon being aired on Sundays as Aksyon Alert only. Tulfo has a new segment called "Itimbre Mo, Tol". The final episode of Aksyon Weekend aired on July 12, 2014, and was replaced by Frontline Pilipinas Weekend. with Raffy Tulfo moving to Aksyon sa Tanghali and Grace Lee being assigned to Aksyon sa Umaga starting July 21, 2014.

The following week, Aksyon Alert extended their broadcast to weekends with the bulletin airing every top of the hour in the morning and a number of times in the afternoon and the evening. Later on, it was expanded and now airs every 30 minutes in the morning starting 9:00 am, and still a number of times in the afternoon and the evening, before it was stopped airing on November 4, 2017, but still continues on weekdays.

==== Final presenters ====
- Raffy Tulfo (2013–14)
- Grace Lee (2013–14)
- Joseph Ubalde † (2013–14, Aksyon Weather Saturday segment presenter)

==== Former presenters ====
- Martin Andanar (2010)
- Cherie Mercado (2010)
- Jove Francisco (2010–12)
- Maricel Halili (2010–12)
- Atty. Mike Templo (2010–12)

=== Aksyon sa Umaga (Morning edition) ===
Aksyon sa Umaga, a morning edition of Aksyon, aired on TV5 from July 21, 2014 to November 3, 2017, replacing Good Morning Club and was replaced by Frontline sa Umaga. The news broadcasting in its last iteration from 5:00 to 6:00 am, PST on TV5 with simulcast on AksyonTV and Radyo5 92.3 News FM. This was the only edition that has frequently changing its presenters due to several commitments. It was the first edition that was axed on November 3, 2017, due to ESPN5's upcoming expansion.

==== Final presenter ====
- Cheryl Cosim (2016–2017)

==== Former presenters ====
- Martin Andanar (2014–16)
- Lourd de Veyra (2014–16)
- Grace Lee (2014–16)
- Paolo Bediones (2014)
- Erwin Tulfo (2016)
- Atty. Mel Sta. Maria (2016)
- Jun Sabayton (2014–16)

=== Aksyon Tonite (Late-Night edition) ===
Aksyon Tonite, an late-night edition of Aksyon, aired on TV5 from July 21, 2014 to March 1, 2019, replacing Pilipinas News and was replaced by Frontline Tonight. The news broadcasting from 10:30 to 10:45 pm, on Weeknights, presented by Cheryl Cosim. The late-night edition recaps the top stories of the day. This edition show concluded on March 1, 2019, to give way for the telecast of the English newscast The Big Story on March 4. Cosim will later return on late-night newscast through 5's delayed telecast of One Balita Pilipinas, which replaces The Big Story's timeslot on September 23.

==== Final presenter ====
- Cheryl Cosim (2014–16; 2018–19)

==== Former main presenters ====
- Paolo Bediones (2014)
- Martin Andanar (2014; former substitute anchor for Bediones)
- Jove Francisco (2014–15, Aksyon Pulitika segment presenter)
- Lia Cruz (2014–17, Weather and Sports segment presenter)
- Marga Vargas (2016–17)
- Ed Lingao (2014–17)
- Maricel Halili (2017–18)

==== Final segments ====
- Foreign News
- Aksyon Sports

==== Former segment presenters ====
- Ina Zara (2014, Health)
- Shawn Yao (2014, Presinto Singko)

== See also ==
- List of TV5 (Philippine TV network) original programming
- List of programs broadcast by One Sports
