= Balitaang Tapat =

Philippine defunct television news show

- Created by: TV5 Network, Inc.
- Developed by: News5
- Directed by: Irco Cornel
- Presented by: Raffy Tulfo; Amelyn Veloso
- Narrated by: Amy Perez
- Opening theme: "Balitaang Tapat theme" composed by Reev Robledo
- Country of origin: Philippines
- Original language: Filipino
- No. of episodes: n/a (airs daily)

Production
- Executive producer: Naomi Dayrit
- Running time: 30 minutes

Original release
- Network: TV5
- Release: November 1, 2010 – May 11, 2012

Balitaang Tapat (The Loyal News) is a Philippine television news broadcasting show broadcast by TV5. Anchored by Raffy Tulfo and Amelyn Veloso, it aired from November 1, 2010 to May 11, 2012. It is aired on every Monday to Friday at 11:30 AM to 12:15 PM (later at 11:30 AM to 12:30 PM and 1:30 PM to 2:00 PM).

== Background ==
The newscast is known for its Itimbre Mo Kay Tulfo segment, where anchor Raffy Tulfo tries to solve community or government problems and other complains that are sent to them either via email or text messaging. In addition, Atty. Mel Sta. Maria (a legal counsel for TV5 Network) was the segment host for Sabi ni Attorney, may K ka. However, unlike all other newscasts of News5, Balitaang Tapat focuses on crime and police reports (especially in Metro Manila), and national news stories come last.

Balitaang Tapat stopped their simulcast over AksyonTV and Radyo5 and ceased airing altogether on May 11, 2012. Two years later, News5 returned to noontime newscasting with Aksyon sa Tanghali, with former Balitaang Tapat anchor Raffy Tulfo and former Aksyon JournalisMO and Pilipinas News anchor Cherie Mercado.

== Anchors ==
- Raffy Tulfo
- Amelyn Veloso

=== Segment presenters ===
- Atty. Mel Sta. Maria (Sabi ni Attorney, may K ka!)
- Pat Fernandez (Aksyon Weather)
- Claudine Trillo (Aksyon Weather)
- Lia Cruz (Short Time)
- Roda Magnaye (Bargain Hunter and Chow Time)
- Ferdinand "Makata Tawanan" Clemente (Makatang Gala)

== Reception ==
=== Viewership ===
According to AGB Neilsen, Balitaang Tapat received 2.2 percent people ratings in Mega Manila from November 25 to 30, 2010.

== See also ==
- List of TV5 (Philippine TV network) original programming
- List of programs broadcast by One Sports
