= Reev Robledo =

Reev Robledo is a music composer, songwriter, teacher and author. He has written various TV themes for networks ABS-CBN, GMA, and TV5. His first commercially released song "Paano Ang Pasko" won Best Christmas Recording in the 11th Awit Awards. In 2014, his first novel, Gitarista, won the Filipino Readers' Choice Awards for fiction in English.

== TV themes ==
=== ABS-CBN ===
- Rated K (2011)
- ABS-CBN News Channel station ID (2010)
- Krusada (2010)
- Probe Profiles (2009)
- KNN Kabataan News Network (2006)

=== TV5 ===
- Unang Tikim (2014)
- Bigtime (2014)
- Kaya (2014)
- Good Morning Club (2012)
- Pilipinas News (2012)
- Rescue 5 (2012)
- T3: Reload (2011)
- Alagang Kapatid (2011)
- Balitang 60 (2011)
- Balitaang Tapat (2011)
- Journo (2010)
- Kidztown (2001)

=== My Movie Channel ===
- My Movie Channel station ID (2014)

=== Jack TV ===
- JackTV station ID (2011)

=== Velvet Channel ===
- Velvet Channel station ID (2012)

=== Balls TV ===
- Balls (TV channel) station ID (2014)

=== GMA ===
- Txtube (2005)
- Fanatxt (2005)
- I-Witness (2002)
- Partners Mel and Jay (2002)

== Books ==
- Hustle 'N Flip: A Young Entrepreneur's Story (2023)
- The Spy Who Slaughtered Kingdoms (2015)
- The Legend of The Cram (2014)
- Gitarista (2013)
- Life Lessons From Teachers (2012)
- An Assassin's Tale (2012)
- The Testimonies (2011)

== Musicals ==
- The Testimonies (2009)
- Shepherd King, The Story of David (2006)
