= Grace Lee =

South Korean businesswoman (born 1984)

- Born: Lee Kyung-hee; October 4, 1982 (age 44); Seoul, South Korea
- Occupations: Businesswoman; TV host; radio disc jockey
- Years active: 2007–2015
- Agent: Zenith Media Contents
- Spouse: Alex Tiu (m. 2024)

Korean name
- Hangul: 이경희
- Hanja: 李敬熙
- RR: I Gyeonghui
- MR: I Kyŏnghŭi

Grace Lee (Korean: 이경희; Lee Kyung-hee) is a South Korean film distributor, businesswoman, former television host and former radio disc jockey based in the Philippines. From 2007 to 2015, she co-hosted several programs on GMA Network and TV5. From 2007 to 2012, she co-hosted the morning radio show Good Times with Mo on Magic 89.9. After retiring as a media host in 2015, Lee established a film distribution company called Glimmer Productions in 2019.

== Biography ==
=== Early life ===
Lee was born on October 4, 1982 in Seoul. She moved to the Philippines at age 10 because of her father's business, which involved importing Korean cars. She studied from second grade to fourth year high school at St. Paul College, Pasig, and graduated from the Ateneo de Manila University, where she obtained her Communication Arts degree. Before becoming a television host, she had been hosting events for Korean-Filipino communities.

=== Career ===
Lee planned on becoming a journalist. She sent her résumé to major television studios in the Philippines and received a callback from GMA Network. She landed her first Philippine TV hosting job in March 2007 as a segment host on Q 11’s lifestyle-magazine show The Sweet Life. Among her first assignments include featuring life in Korea where she gets to wear traditional female garb as well as interviewing prominent Korean celebrities such as Yoon Se Ah of Lovers in Prague and The Great King, Sejong drama series.

She stayed with Magic 89.9 from 2007 up to 2012 co-hosting the morning radio show Good Times with Mo with Mo Twister and Mojo Jojo as a replacement for Andi-9. Lee is also a Manila correspondent for YTN in Korea, as well as teaching at the Manila New Life Church's Sunday school for preschool students and takes part in various outreach programs.

Lee was added as an anchor of "Silip Showbiz" (a segment of News on Q) and then hosted a cooking reality show, Eateria that aired every Sunday mornings on GMA Network. Lee also hosted Diz Iz It! that aired 6 days a week on GMA. She was also a guest segment anchor both for Balitanghali on GMA News TV during weekdays (2011–2012), and 24 Oras Weekend Edition during Saturdays on GMA.

In August 2012, Lee left GMA Network and moved to TV5. Upon her arrival on TV5, she was joined by Martin Andanar as co-anchor on Andar ng mga Balita on AksyonTV and also joined Good Morning Club.

In January 2013, Lee became a co-host on TV5's noontime variety show, Wowowillie, with main host Willie Revillame and also became an anchor for Aksyon Weekend, alongside Raffy Tulfo during Saturday nights.

From July 2014 until 2015, she became an early morning news anchor in the first of four editions of Aksyon, Aksyon sa Umaga alongside Martin Andanar, Lourd de Veyra, Erwin Tulfo, Cheryl Cosim and Melencio Santa Maria.

In 2015, she went inactive on-screen.

In 2019, Lee established Glimmer Productions, a Philippine-based company focusing on distributing Korean films and aims to produce original content, with the 2022 South Korean crime-action film The Roundup as its first "big outing" as a production company. Prior to the COVID-19 pandemic, she had plans to showcase Korean-Filipino film and live entertainment projects, but those projects would be stalled until 2022. Apart from film distribution, she handles a Korean food business venture.

== Personal life ==
Lee can speak English and Tagalog in addition to her native Korean.

She was once in a relationship with Benigno Aquino III, the 15th president of the Philippines. She admitted to the relationship on her show stating in response to the president's claim of their relationship, "what the president said is true".

In 2011, Lee and her sister began applying for Filipino citizenship through naturalization.

On October 25, 2024, Lee married businessman Alex Tiu in a church ceremony in Seoul. In October 2026, Lee announced that she and her husband were expecting their first child, a son.

== Filmography ==
=== TV shows ===
Year	Show	Role
2007–2011	The Sweet Life	Herself/Main host
2009	Good Times	Herself/Host
2010	Eateria	Herself/Host
2010	Diz Iz It	Herself/Host
2010–2012	24 Oras Weekend	Herself/Anchor (Chika Minute)
2010–2011	News on Q	Herself/Anchor (Silip Showbiz)
2011–2012	Balitanghali	Herself/Anchor (Star Bites)
2012	Cooking with the Stars	Herself/Host
2012–2013	Andar ng mga Balita	Herself/Anchor
2012–2013	Wil Time Bigtime	Herself/Co-host
2012–2014	Good Morning Club	Herself/Anchor
2013	Wowowillie	Herself/Co-host
2013–2014	Aksyon Weekend (Saturday & Sunday)	Herself/Anchor
2014–2016	Aksyon sa Umaga	Herself/Anchor
2014–2015	Aksyon sa Tanghali	Herself/Relief anchor for Cherie Mercado

== Radio shows ==
Year	Show	Role	Station
2007–2012	Good Times with Mo	Co-host	Magic 89.9
