= MTB (TV program) =

Philippine noontime variety show

- Title card, c. 1998
- Also known as: Magandang Tanghali Bayan (1998–2003); Esep-Esep (1999); Masayang Tanghali Bayan (2003–2004); MTB Ang Saya Saya (2004–2005)
- Genre: Variety, comedy
- Created by: ABS-CBN Studios
- Developed by: ABS-CBN Studios
- Presented by: Randy Santiago; John Estrada; Willie Revillame; Amy Perez; Roderick Paulate; Ai-Ai delas Alas; Edu Manzano; Arnell Ignacio
- Country of origin: Philippines
- Original language: Filipino

Production
- Production locations: Studio 3, ABS-CBN Broadcasting Center, Quezon City, Philippines
- Running time: 1 hour and 30 minutes (Weekdays, 1998–2001, Weekdays and Saturdays, 2004–2005); 2 hours (Weekdays, 2001–2003); 2 hours and 30 minutes (Saturdays, 1999–2003 and Weekdays, 2003–2004); 3 hours (Saturdays, 2003–2004)

Original release
- Network: ABS-CBN
- Release: November 30, 1998 – February 4, 2005

Related
- Family Kuarta o Kahon; Eat Bulaga!; 'Sang Linggo nAPO Sila; Wowowee; It's Showtime; Pilipinas Win Na Win; Happy Yipee Yehey!; It's Your Lucky Day; Tahanang Pinakamasaya

Magandang Tanghali Bayan (MTB) (transl. good noontime, nation) or Masayang Tanghali Bayan (transl. happy noontime, nation), later known as MTB Ang Saya Saya (transl. MTB, it's so much fun or transl. MTB, a very happy time), was a Philippine noontime variety show broadcast by ABS-CBN. It aired from November 30, 1998, to February 4, 2005, replacing 'Sang Linggo nAPO Sila and was later replaced by Wowowee. The program was also broadcast worldwide through The Filipino Channel (TFC).

The show was known for its many formats and host changes over the years. Magandang Tanghali Bayan – the original run of MTB – is the fourth longest running noontime show of ABS-CBN after It's Showtime, Eat Bulaga! and Wowowee, staying on air for 4 years, 2 months and 22 days from 1998 to 2003. Other MTB incarnations such as Masayang Tanghali Bayan and MTB Ang Saya Saya stayed on air for around one year each, before Wowowee eventually took over. Including all of its iterations however, MTB was ABS-CBN's longest running daily noontime show until It's Showtime surpassed its run in 2016.

== History ==
=== Magandang Tanghali Bayan/Esep-Esep (1998–2003) ===
As ABS-CBN decided to remove Sang Linggo nAPO Sila, the management decided to produce 2 noontime variety shows, one airing daily and one airing weekly. ABS-CBN's new daily noontime show Magandang Tanghali Bayan (MTB), started premiering on November 30, 1998, airing between 12:00 and 13:30, Philippine time. The weekly noontime show, APO Hiking Society's Sabado Live occupied the Saturday timeslot. The original hosts of MTB were Randy Santiago, John Estrada, Willie Revillame, Christine Jacob-Sandejas, Roderick Paulate, Vanessa del Bianco, Yen Serrano, and Amy Perez. The show aired live from Studio 3 of ABS-CBN Broadcasting Center in Quezon City. This marks the return of Christine Jacob to ABS-CBN since she left when she was a co-host of now rival Eat Bulaga! which moved to the rival network GMA Network in 1995.

The show assumed most of the segments and staff from its predecessor 'Sang Linggo nAPO Sila during its first season. Meanwhile, former Tropang Trumpo director Edgar Mortiz also joined the show as the show's creative consultant. Among the most popular segments from APO's previous noontime show was "Calendar Girl", a daily pageant where girls between 15–21 years of age participate in the talent and question-and-answer portions hosted by Estrada, Santiago and Revillame. To continue the chronology of the pageant (where monthly winners from January to December of the previous year converge to compete in the Grand Finals of the following year), management decided to include the January–November monthly winners from the defunct "APO" show in the MTB grand coronation that happened on January 2, 1999.

In December 1998, Pera o Bayong (lit. transl. Money or Basket) debuted on TV as MTB's highlight game portion. The engaging elimination round and the suspense-filled jackpot round won the hearts of most viewers. It gave MTB better overall ratings than 'Sang Linggo nAPO Sila, and the show even overtook IBC's Chopsuey Espesyal (which was later replaced by Alas Dose sa Trese and Lunch Break) and GMA's Eat Bulaga! as the top weekday noontime variety show from early 1999 until Revillame's ouster in March 2001. This led the management to cancel Sabado Live! on its Saturday timeslot and replace it with MTB's Saturday edition, which started to air on March 6, 1999 between 12:00 and 14:30. Mortiz was promoted as the noontime show's new director along with Bobet Vidanes.

MTB also had its share of controversies. The Calendar Girl portion became notorious for the main hosts' crude humor which subsequently got warnings from Movie and Television Review and Classification Board (MTRCB), then headed by veteran actress Armida Siguion-Reyna. Eventually, the ABS-CBN management intervened and suspended the three main hosts indefinitely. With their suspension from August 7, 1999, onwards, the show was temporarily renamed to Esep-Esep for 20 days. Estrada, Santiago, and Revillame returned on August 28, 1999, after their suspension almost three weeks later.

On January 1, 2000, the show covered the millennium celebration at Times Square in New York City, United States. Three weeks later on January 22 of the same year, the show was celebrated on its first anniversary at the Folk Arts Theater.

In the year 2000, the game portion Pera o Bayong faced competition from the long-running noontime show Eat Bulaga! when it produced a segment called Meron o Wala (Something or Nothing). But despite the move from the rival show, Pera o Bayong continued to attract viewers. The popular catchphrases coined by the hosts eventually became part of Filipino pop culture. Because of its immense popularity, Pera o Bayong was made into a movie version entitled Pera o Bayong not da TV by Star Cinema that year, with the entire MTB cast included.

Changes were suddenly made after the February 7, 2001 episode, when main host Willie Revillame was fired from the show due to creative differences between him and the staff. Matinee idols Marvin Agustin, Dominic Ochoa, and Rico Yan (collectively known as "Whattamen") replaced him on the show. Stand-up comedians Marissa Sanchez and Ai-Ai delas Alas also joined the show as the new female co-hosts. On March 12 of the same year, the show was reformatted without Revillame and expanded to 2 hours on weekdays. MTB also started doing out-of-town shows abroad during that same year to promote ABS-CBN's international channel TFC.

In March 2002, MTB lost a co-host, Rico Yan, who died during his Holy Week vacation in Dos Palmas Resort, Palawan. The show aired a week-long tribute for him. That same year, the show introduced new faces to join the growing MTB family. The quintet Power Boys, the dance group G-Girls, morning traffic angel Pia Guanio, and upcoming teen star Maoui David were among those who joined. Around this time, Christine Jacob-Sandejas left the show to focus on her family. At the same time, original mainstay and regular voice-over announcer Gary Lim was also relieved from the show to focus on his acting career.

During the 4th anniversary of the show in November 2002, the show underwent a major revamp with new game portions and some established ABS-CBN stars (Judy Ann Santos, Edu Manzano, Ryan Agoncillo) co-hosting every week. By this time, the show had lost its luster in the ratings game to Eat Bulaga! following the rising popularity of the reality TV portion Sige Ano Kaya Mo? and creating new sensations out of the Sexbomb Dancers.

During the last week of its incarnation from February 17 to 21, 2003, the show was relocated to ABS-CBN Studio 1 and it was hosted by the show's co-hosts, without Estrada and Santiago.

MTB ended its four-year run on February 21, 2003, coinciding with the departures of co-hosts Roderick Paulate and Amy Perez from the noontime slot to give way to Willie Revillame's TV comeback on the same timeslot. The title of the replacement show, Masayang Tanghali Bayan, and Willie's co-hosts (among them Estrada and Santiago) were not revealed until 12:00 of February 22, 2003.

=== Masayang Tanghali Bayan (2003–2004) ===
Before the start of the show, ABS-CBN engaged in month-long promotions for the replacement show where they only revealed Willie Revillame, the JaBoom Twins, and Cindy Kurleto as mainstays and had the audience guess the rest of the co-hosts through a nationwide raffle promo. The title of the show was also kept secret.

It was on the initial telecast on February 22, 2003, when Willie Revillame revealed the title Masayang Tanghali Bayan and his co-hosts through an elaborate opening number. He was joined by Randy Santiago, John Estrada, Dennis Padilla, Ai-Ai delas Alas, Bayani Agbayani, Mickey Ferriols, and Aubrey Miles. Resident comedians Tado and Bentong also came on board. The show was directed by famous TV director Johnny Manahan. The show had more game portions giving out big cash prizes through Super Jack en Poy and Urong Sulong which gives out 2 million PHP as the highest possible jackpot prize. It was also touted as the biggest noontime show of ABS-CBN, with a simultaneous airing on the Kapamilya Network's UHF channel, Studio 23.

Like its predecessor, the second version of MTB also attracted controversy when John Estrada and Willie Revillame were suspended because of delivering their usual green jokes during the Super Jack en Poy jackpot round. The show's cast also grew with the inclusion of former Kapuso comedians Long Mejia and Dagul.

There is a celebrity edition of all show's game segments where several celebrities and/or prominent personalities are playing every Saturday.

However, before 2003 was about to end, Willie Revillame resigned from the show after a public outcry when he delivered a derogatory joke to midget co-host Mahal during her birthday.

The show continued to air until February 2004 with Vhong Navarro and Edu Manzano taking over Revillame's place. However, Masayang Tanghali Bayan failed to sustain viewership and was removed on February 20, 2004, coinciding with the departures of hosts Randy Santiago and John Estrada from the noontime slot.

=== MTB Ang Saya Saya (2004–2005) ===
The ABS-CBN management capitalized on Ai-Ai delas Alas' rising popularity following her box-office triumph in Star Cinema's Ang Tanging Ina. She was named the main host together with Edu Manzano and former GMA Network resident game show host Arnell Ignacio in the third incarnation of MTB. Mickey Ferriols and Tado were also retained from the former show along with the younger favored co-hosts and were joined by the Viva Hot Babes, and newcomers BJ Manalo, Jeni Hernandez, and Empoy.

MTB Ang Saya Saya premiered on February 21, 2004, with more reality-based talent search segments launched. TV Idol (You're the Man!) and Luv Idol: Ur D Pair gained popularity among the viewers and gave birth to the showbiz careers of Ahron Villena, AJ Dee, and JE Estrada. The show also made household names out of Joross Gamboa, Roxanne Guinoo, and Sandara Park who were newcomers from their winning stints in the reality show Star Circle Quest. However, these efforts were overshadowed by rival Eat Bulaga! which celebrated its 25th anniversary on television with a Silver Special.

On November 15, 2004, MTB Ang Saya Saya lost its prime 12:00 timeslot to Kris Aquino's Pilipinas, Game KNB? and started airing as an afternoon variety show on a 12:45. time slot. Soon after, main host Edu Manzano resigned in 2005 to concentrate on his duties as chairman of the Optical Media Board (OMB).

The show ended on February 4, 2005, and was replaced by Wowowee, hosted by Willie Revillame, who made his third comeback on the ABS-CBN noontime slot due to public clamor.

In January 2011, ABS-CBN announced through its Push.com site that a new noontime show, hosted by ex-MTB hosts Santiago and Estrada as well as Toni Gonzaga and ex-Wowowee host Mariel Rodriguez, was in the works. The noontime show was eventually called Happy Yipee Yehey! and would run from February 2011 to February 2012.

== Segments ==
=== Pera o Bayong ===
Pera o Bayong became one of the more popular segments on MTB. The game's concept came from another Philippine TV show Kwarta o Kahon (Cash or Box) which aired on Sundays on RPN.

The original version of the game started with at least 36 players answering a series of multiple-choice questions (A, B, C, or D), hoping to eliminate all others until only one remained. The most popular type of question involved the scientific names of plants and animals, with at least two of the four choices noticeably joke answers.

If two people remain in the game and both choose the correct answer, the first person to arrive at his/her choice is declared the winner.

The winner of the elimination round then moves on to the jackpot round where he or she begins by choosing one of three bayongs marked M, T, or B (for the show's title). Each bayong contains a concealed piece of cardboard on which is written what the contestant is playing for. But during the suspension of Santiago, Estrada and Revillame, M and T were replaced with P and O.

There is a bargaining session where the host (usually Revillame and later Ochoa on the show's reformat) would offer cash (pera) in exchange for the contestant abandoning the prize hidden in the bayong. After each offer, Amy Perez and Roderick Paulate, along with the celebrity guests in 2002, lead the crowd in asking "Pera o Bayong?" and the contestant declares his or her choice.

The number of bargaining sessions varies from day to day, depending on the mood/emotional status of both the host and the contestant. Originally, The prizes in the bayong would range from nothing to a different foods, cheaper items, different toys, fashion items, showcase of the day, house with a lot, electronic devices, different appliances, trips, different vehicles and/or others. Later, during the reformat in 2001, the prize of 1 million PHP would be included.

In its early days, the prize that was inside the chosen bayong was revealed to the audience during the sessions. Sometimes, family members went to a TV inside the cafeteria at the ABS-CBN studios to see what the prize was, then tried to influence the crowd to beg for the contestant to take whatever was in the bayong. After this was discovered the TV was switched off during the round. Later the prize was not revealed to anyone until it was opened.

There is a celebrity edition where several celebrities (e.g. actors, actresses, singers, and hosts) and/or prominent personalities (e.g. newscasters, reporters, athletes, disc jockeys, and politicians) are playing every Saturday.

After the cancellation of MTB, an improved version of Pera o Bayong debuted as a part of Wowowee, retitled "Bigtime" Pera o Bayong.

This segment is also played in Happy Yipee Yehey! and in It's Showtime under the same title.

The winner of the elimination round then moves on to the jackpot round where he or she begins by choosing one of 7 bayongs. Each bayong contains an Inside The Bayong Rattan Bags Number Cards Of 1 Or 0 Places on which is written what the contestant is playing for.

This segment is brought back as a digital game show on the Kumu app, produced by ABS-CBN Regional.

The game also aired on the Launching of PIE Channel on May 26, 2022, as of the Programming Block, Pie-Nalo.

=== Calendar Girl ===
Calendar Girl was a pageant contest for girls aged 15 to 21 years old. In the daily rounds, contestants paraded the MTB stage wearing a two-piece bikini/swimsuit while in the weekly/monthly finals, the pageant transforms into a more formal portion, with a grand "themed" opening number featuring contestants in various costumes, but still retaining the swimsuit portion. The grand coronation of "Calendar Girls" airs usually in the first half of January, featuring all the monthly winners of the past year who will vie for the title.

The said portion gained notoriety, where the contestants were subjected to double entendre questions and risqué jokes thrown by main hosts Randy, John, and Willie Revillame. After their suspension, the daily contests were toned down, with the contestants wearing a cloth around their waists to cover the lower portion of their bodies.

=== Wansa Funny Taym ===
Wansa Funny Taym was a comedy skit segment performed by the hosts and guests featuring a storyline. The storylines provided were mostly spoofs on pop culture and everyday life.

=== Other segments ===
Other popular segments included: Sa Pula, Sa Puti (Tanggal ang Mali), Pakita Mo Puppet Mo, Munting Miss U, Super Lolo, Bulilit Japorms, Mr. Ador-able, Sing It, Milenyonaryo, and Winner Take All. When the show reformatted in later years, other segments that made an impact were: Sing Alis, Ano Ka, Hilo?, Oo, Kaya Ko!, and .MTBGo

==== Magandang Tanghali Bayan segments ====
- Cash Ng Bayan (1998–1999)
- Pera o Bayong (1998–2002)
- Calendar Girl (1999–2002)
- Munting Miss U
- Sa Pula, Sa Puti (Tanggal ang Mali)
- Winner Take All (2001–2002)
- Hula Bira
- Thaliataliada (2000)
- Pakita Mo Puppet Mo
- Super Lolo
- Bulilit Japorms
- Bataoke
- Showmai Mommy
- Showgay
- Showgirl G.R.O.2000
- Mr. Ador-able
- Doble Karaoke (1999)
- Star Quest (The Nationwide Campus Singing Competition, The second incarnation for daily edition from 2000 to 2002, As part and the first incarnation original singing competition segment for Sunday edition of Sa Linggo nAPO Sila from 1989 to 1995)
- Wansa Funny Taym
- Sing It
- Coca-Cola Pamaskong Payaman (Sponsored by Coca-Cola)
- Milenyonaryo (2000)
- Awards Ka D'yan
- Loveli-Vanessa
- Hunk-A-Babe
- Magkapera Tayo sa Bahay
- Sing Alis (2001)
- Quiz Tayo
- Flawless de Mayo
- Ano Ka, Hilo?
- Oo, Kaya Ko!
- Awards Ka Diyan
- MTBGo
- Cash O Kaha
- Dance Alis
- Datsa Ratsa Money
- Make My Dare (Sponsored by Aquafresh)
- Atras o Abante
- Whattatext
- Miss Terrific Body: Bikini Watch (Sponsored by Block & White)
- U-Ring, U-Win
- Mission Text
- Pls. Konek
- Surveyvor
- Sagot Ng Bayan
- Todo Na 'To!
- WWW dat Ano?
- Sing A Gong
- Sing A Dunk
- Sakto!!
- Cheer Boom Bah
- Game Ka Na Bayan
- Chicks in the City
- Kita Mo
- Pera Busog
- Surbeibor
- Power Girls
- Power Breakers
- TOPSilog: The Beyblade Challenge
- Matira Ang Matibay: Challenge Sa Barangay
- Lucky Egg Mo
- Pasko Paksing Na Naman Muli
- Queen Of The World
- Mag-Nestle Almusal Gising Milyonaryo (Sponsored by Nestle)

==== Masayang Tanghali Bayan segments ====
- Super Jack en Poy
- Urong Sulong
- Mr. Suave
- Macho Garden/Planetang Tutong
- Sexy Flying Girls
- Joke, Joke, Joke
- Memorace
- Minus All
- Jologs
- Mahal o Mura
- 1+1 Rambulan
- SMB Jingaling (Sponsored by San Miguel Beer)
- Miniature Garden
- Front to Front to Front (Saturdays)

==== MTB Ang Saya Saya segments ====
- Libre Load
- Libre Cellphone
- Libre Kuryente
- TV Idol (Monday - Saturday)
- Spin A Million (Monday - Wednesday - Friday)
- Global Pinay (Tuesday - Thursday - Saturday)
- Bilog Ang Mundo (Sponsored by Ginebra San Miguel)
- Fresh Girls
- Star in a Magic
- Tsong Hits
- SMB Jingaling (Sponsored by San Miguel Beer)
- Viva Hot Games
- Luv Idol
- Senior Citizens Quest
- Hatataw
- Hakatak : Hakot Attack

== Hosts ==
=== Magandang Tanghali Bayan (1998-2003) ===
==== Main hosts ====
- Randy Santiago
- John Estrada
- Willie Revillame (1998–2001)

==== Co-hosts ====
- Roderick Paulate (1998–2003)
- Amy Perez (1998–2003)
- Bayani Agbayani (1998–2003)
- Bentong+ (1998–2003)
- Bojo Molina (1998–2001)
- Gary Lim (1998–2002)
- Vanessa del Bianco (1998–2003)
- Carding Castro+ (1998–99)
- Christine Jacob-Sandejas (1998–2001)
- Claudine Barretto (1998–2002)
- Jolina Magdangal (1998–2001)
- G. Toengi
- Diether Ocampo (1998–99)
- Wowie de Guzman (1998–99)
- Belinda Panelo
- Dominic Ochoa (1999, 2001–03)
- Kiray Celis (2000–03)
- Carmina Villarroel (1999)
- Vina Morales (1999–2000)
- Rica Peralejo (1999–2002)
- Ai-Ai delas Alas (2001–03)
- Paula Peralejo (2000–02)
- Camille Prats (2000–03)
- Bernard Cardona (1999–2003)
- Rico Yan+ (2001–02)
- Marvin Agustin (2001–03)
- Angela Velez (2001–03)
- Pia Guanio (2002–03)
- Dennis Padilla (2002–03)
- Michelle Bayle
- Karel Marquez (2002–03)
- Aurora Halili
- The Powerboys
  - Jordan Herrera
  - Geoff Rodriguez
  - Frank Garcia
  - Jay Salas
  - Greg Martin
- Marissa Sanchez
- Anne Curtis (2002)
- Chary Lopez
- Mylene Dizon
- Regine Tolentino
- Kaye Abad
- Melisa Henderson
- Maoui David
- Yuuki Kadooka (2002–03)
- Judy Ann Santos (1998; 2002–03)
- Bea Alonzo (2002–03)
- Yen Serrano (1998)
- Ryan Agoncillo (2002–03)
- Edu Manzano (2002–03)

==== Guest co-hosts ====
- Jericho Rosales
- Angelica Panganiban
- Emman Abeleda
- Martin Nievera
- Paolo Montalban

=== Masayang Tanghali Bayan (2003-2004) ===
==== Main hosts ====
- Randy Santiago
- John Estrada
- Willie Revillame (2003)

==== Co-hosts ====
- Ai-Ai delas Alas
- Aubrey Miles
- Cindy Kurleto
- Mahal+
- Mura
- Mickey Ferriols
- Bayani Agbayani
- Dennis Padilla
- Long Mejia
- Bentong+
- Tado Jimenez+
- Angelica Jones
- Diether Ocampo
- Jericho Rosales
- Piolo Pascual
- Bernard Palanca
- Carlos Agassi
- Rica Peralejo
- Claudine Barretto
- Judy Ann Santos
- Kristine Hermosa
- Jaboom Twins
- Angelene Aguilar
- Bernard Cardona
- Assunta de Rossi
- Roselle Nava
- Sheryn Regis
- Dagul
- JE Sison

=== MTB: Ang Saya Saya (2004-2005) ===
==== Main hosts ====
- Ai-Ai delas Alas
- Edu Manzano
- Arnell Ignacio

==== Co-hosts ====
- Mickey Ferriols
- Angelica Jones
- Vhong Navarro
- BJ Manalo
- Jenny Hernandez
- Tado Jimenez†
- Empoy
- Bentong†
- Baby Bunot
- Viva Hot Babes
- Joross Gamboa
- Angelene Aguilar
- Archie Alemania
- Melissa Ricks
- Angelika dela Cruz
- Sheryn Regis
- Jasmine Trias
- Carla Humphries
- Pokwang

The TV Idols

- Ahron Villena
- AJ Dee
- Marc Cortez
- JE Sison
- Kiko Matos

=== Directors ===
- Danni Caparas (1998–1999)
- Edgar Mortiz (Monday to Friday) (1999–2003)
- Bobet Vidanes (Saturday) (1999–2003)
- Willy Cuevas (for MTB Lenten Specials) (1999–2004)
- Johnny Manahan (Masayang Tanghali Bayan) (2003–2004)
- Arnel Natividad (MTB: Ang Saya Saya) (2004–2005)

== See also ==
- List of programs broadcast by ABS-CBN
- Eat Bulaga!
- 'Sang Linggo nAPO Sila
- Pilipinas Win Na Win
- Wowowee
- Happy Yipee Yehey!
- It's Showtime
- It's Your Lucky Day

== In popular culture ==
- Masayang Tanghali Bayan's "Flying Sexy Girl" segment was featured in one scene of the 2004 movie Volta also produced by Star Cinema. In that scene, the movie's protagonist Perla (Ai-Ai delas Alas) decides to use her newly acquired powers as Volta to enter the contest and win a cash prize to help pay for sister Penny's (Pauleen Luna) hospital bills, much to the dismay of their brother Percy (Justin Cuyugan) who watched his sister's performance on his company office's television while on lunch break.

== Pera o Bayong: Not da TV ==
Pera o Bayong: Not da TV
- Directed by: Edgar Mortiz
- Written by: Wilbur F. Hernandez
- Based on: the segment of Magandang Tanghali Bayan
- Produced by: Charo Santos-Concio
- Starring: Willie Revillame; Randy Santiago; John Estrada
- Cinematography: George Tutanes
- Edited by: Augusto Salvador
- Music by: Ruben Cadsawan
- Production company: Star Cinema
- Release date: July 26, 2000
- Running time: 204 minutes
- Country: Philippines
- Language: Filipino

Due to the phenomenal success of Pera o Bayong in 1999, ABS-CBN's film arm Star Cinema produced a movie "Pera o Bayong: not da TV" with Edgar Mortiz directing and the whole cast of MTB included (except for Christine Jacob). Veteran actors Mark Gil, Paquito Diaz, Nanding Josef, Bayani Agbayani, Bentong, Norman Mitchell, Mike Gayoso, Hyubs Azarcon, Bangkay, Vangie Labalan and Bella Flores with special participation of Noli de Castro, Ernie Baron, Marc Logan, Kiko Pangilinan, Roderick Paulate and Amy Perez had pivotal roles in the movie while young actresses Tracy Vergel and Kristine Hermosa joined MTB mainstay Vanessa del Bianco as leading ladies to respective lead stars Willie Revillame, Randy Santiago and John Estrada. The movie was released on July 26, 2000.

=== Plot ===
Estranged cousins Mauricio, Tiburcio and Bartolome were forced to take responsibility in taking care of their late grandfather Topacio's claim on the land where Barangay Esep-Esep stands. In between their responsibility, the cousins take odd jobs to survive life in the city and incidentally fall in love with the three daughters of Don Juanito, the prospective buyer of the said land. In addition, the three cousins also face constant bullying from Burado, the main henchman of Don Juanito. With no copy of the land title in their hands, the cousins had to raise 5 million PHP in cash to pay off Don Juanito or face eviction.

While watching TV, the cousins coincidentally found a solution to the problem by joining the famous game show Pera o Bayong which offered the same amount that they need to keep the land. Unfortunately, due to lack of instinct, strategy and common sense during the jackpot round of the game portion, they lost out on the bid for the jackpot prize. As they faced eviction, the three cousins convinced their neighbors to voluntarily demolish their houses to avoid a violent confrontation. However, an accident during the voluntary demolish exposes the land title document where it was examined by Don Juanito's lawyer and found to be legal. The cousins engaged Burador and his gang in a fight after Burador was exposed by the lawyer to have illegally sold the land to Don Juanito. After Mauricio, Tiburcio, Bartolome and their neighbors successfully defeat Burador and his gang, Don Juanito arrivs at the demolition site with the policemen and announces he was deceived by Burador and had him arrested along with his men. Don Juanito apologizes to the cousins for the misunderstanding while allowing the three to see his daughters again.
