= Boboy Garrovillo =

Filipino singer

- Born: Jose Teves Garrovillo Jr. October 10, 1951 (age 75); Dipolog, Zamboanga del Norte
- Genres: OPM; Manila sound
- Occupations: Singer, actor, television host, composer
- Years active: 1969–present

Jose Teves Garrovillo Jr. (born October 10, 1951), professionally known as Boboy Garrovillo, is a Filipino actor and musician. He is known as one of the members of the musical trio Apo Hiking Society along with Danny Javier and Jim Paredes. He is also regarded as one of the pillars and icons of Original Pilipino Music (OPM).

== Personal life ==
Garrovillo was born in Dipolog, Zamboanga del Norte to Jose Garrovillo Sr. and Paulita Teves, sister of Senator Lorenzo Teves and aunt of the former Secretary of Finance, Margarito Teves. He is married to Elizabeth "Bong" Agcaoili and they have two sons, Alfonso and Antonio. Just like his fellow APO bandmates, he went to study at Ateneo de Manila high school. In college, he took an economics course at the Ateneo de Manila University.

== Filmography ==
=== Film ===
Year	Title	Role
1977	Kung Mangarap Ka't Magising	Mike
1980	Kakabakaba Ka Ba?	Onota
1981	Blue Jeans	College student
1986	Payaso	
1995	Pare Ko	Dong Martinez
2011	Shake, Rattle and Roll 13	Bikbok
2012	Just One Summer	Berting Salazar
2012	This Guy's In Love With You Mare	Gemma's dad
2013	Four Sisters and a Wedding	Honey Bayag
2014	Da Possessed	Doctor
2014	Maybe This Time	Butch Asuncion
2018	Miss Granny	Bert
2023	Yung Libro sa Napanood Ko	Pio
2024	My Sassy Girl	

=== Television ===
- Sa Linggo nAPO Sila (1989–1995)
- 'Sang Linggo nAPO Sila (1995–1998)
- Mr. Kupido (1992–1995)
- Sabado Live (1998–1999)
- Oki Doki Doc (2000) as Joaquin "Jake" Makunatan
- Ang Pinaka (2005)
- Marimar (2007)
- Celebrity Duets: Philippine Edition season 1 (2007)
- Nagsimula sa Puso (2009)
- Talentadong Pinoy (TV5, 2010)
- Diva ( 2010)
- Precious Hearts Romances Presents: Mana Po (2011)
- The Jose and Wally Show Starring Vic Sotto (TV5, 2011)
- Alice Bungisngis and her Wonder Walis (2012)
- Aso ni San Roque (2012) as Noah
- Annaliza (2013)
- Ipaglaban Mo: Ang Pangako Mo Sa Akin (2014)
- Hawak Kamay (2014)
- Pepito Manaloto (2015)
- Pangako Sa 'Yo (2015)
- Ipaglaban Mo: Nakaw Na Sandali (2015)
- Langit Lupa (2016)
- Tubig at Langis (2016)
- Tadhana (2017)
- Dear Uge (2017)
- Sana Dalawa ang Puso (2018)
- Sino ang May Sala?: Mea Culpa (2019)
- Hanggang sa Dulo ng Buhay Ko (2019)
- First Yaya (2021)
- First Lady (2022)
- Unica Hija (2022)
- Daddy's Gurl (2023)
- Imbestigador: Bata sa Washing Machine (2023)
- Lilet Matias: Attorney-at-Law (2024)
- Encantadia Chronicles: Sang'gre (2025)
- You're My Favorite Song (2026)
