= Insider (Philippine TV program) =

- Genre: Documentary
- Created by: Associated Broadcasting Company
- Developed by: News5
- Directed by: Abbie S.J. Lara
- Presented by: various
- Country of origin: Philippines
- Original language: Tagalog
- No. of episodes: 26

Production
- Executive producers: Archie Madrid; Jallawee Balitan
- Running time: 1 hour (AksyonTV); 30 minutes (TV5)

Original release
- Network: TV5
- Release: February 2 – August 2, 2012

Insider is a Philippine television investigative journalism program broadcast by TV5. Hosted by the news anchors of News5, it aired from February 2 to August 2, 2012. The program originally aired every Thursday at 10:15pm (PST) on TV5, with a Producer's Cut at 7:30pm (PST) on AksyonTV.

== List of Insider episodes ==
Episode no.	Episode title	Host	Aired
1	Matadero	Cherie Mercado	February 2, 2012
2	Bilibid	Atty. Mike Templo	February 9, 2012
3	Navotas Fishport Complex	Cheryl Cosim	February 16, 2012
4	PNPA	Martin Andanar	February 23, 2012
5	Embalsamo	Atty. Mike Templo	March 1, 2012
6	The Amazing Show	Chiqui Roa-Puno	March 8, 2012
7	Bumbero	Martin Andanar	March 15, 2012
8	Mental	Atty. Mike Templo	March 22, 2012
9	Liham	Lourd de Veyra	March 29, 2012
10	Sabong	Cheryl Cosim	April 12, 2012
11	Rodeo Masbateño	Atty. Mike Templo	April 19, 2012
12	Karera	Cherie Mercado	April 26, 2012
13	Balikatan	Cheryl Cosim	May 3, 2012
14	MMA: Mixed Martial Arts	Atty. Mike Templo	May 10, 2012
15	Call Center	Lourd de Veyra	May 17, 2012
16	Batang Aquarium	Atty. Mike Templo	May 24, 2012
17	Baga	Cheryl Cosim	May 31, 2012
18	Aruga	Chiqui Roa-Puno	June 7, 2012
19	Badjao	Atty. Mike Templo	June 14, 2012
20	Bayan ng Talugtug	Atty. Mike Templo	June 21, 2012
21	Lunas	Cheryl Cosim	June 28, 2012
22	Resettlement Area	Chiqui Roa-Puno	July 5, 2012
23	Bayang Walang Lupa	Atty. Mike Templo	July 12, 2012
24	Trabahador	Atty. Mike Templo	July 19, 2012
25	Tulay	Lourd de Veyra	July 26, 2012
26	Doctor To The Barrio	Atty. Mike Templo	August 2, 2012

== See also ==
- List of TV5 (Philippine TV network) original programming
- List of programs broadcast by One Sports
