= Jim Paredes =

Filipino musician (born 1951)

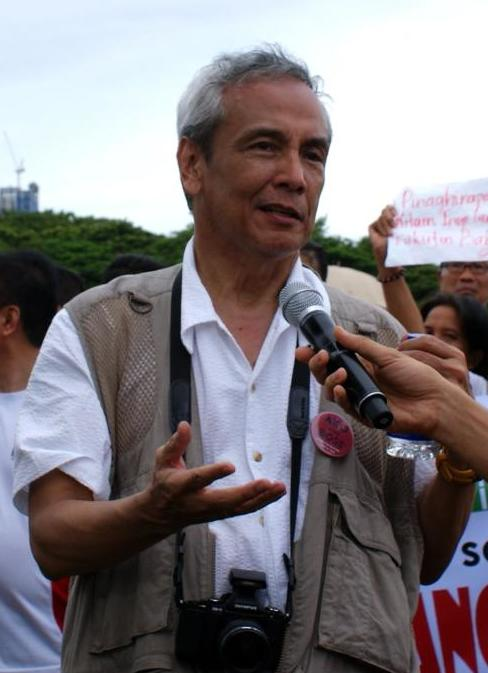
- Paredes in 2013
- Born: Jaime Ramon Misa Paredes; August 30, 1951 (age 75); Manila, Philippines
- Education: Ateneo de Manila University
- Occupations: Musician; television personality
- Spouse: Lydia Mabanta
- Children: 3, including Ala Paredes
- Musical career
- Genres: Pop; OPM
- Instrument: Vocals
- Years active: 1969–present
- Label: Universal Records
- Member of: Apo Hiking Society
- Website: jimparedes.com

Jaime Ramon Misa Paredes (born August 30, 1951), better known simply as Jim Paredes, is a Filipino singer, songwriter, television host, writer, actor and activist. He is known as one of the members of popular musical trio Apo Hiking Society along with Danny Javier and Boboy Garovillo. Regarded as one of the pillars and icons of Original Pilipino Music (OPM). He is the son of Ester Paredes Jimenez, a staunch martial law activist.

Paredes' most prominent collaboration work with himself and multiple artists called, Handog ng Pilipino sa Mundo, became the anthem of the peaceful People Power Revolution that overthrew the regime of Ferdinand Marcos. It was participated in by 15 Filipino artists in April of that year, and its English version "A New and Better Way" was launched in Australia a few months after. In recognition of its significance, the lyrics of the song are embedded on a wall of the EDSA Shrine, a chapel commemorating the revolution. Paredes' other compositions includes When I Met You, Panalangin, Batang-Bata Ka Pa, Yakap sa Dilim, Mahirap Magmahal Ng Syota Ng Iba, San' Na Nga Ba'ng Barkada Ngayon, Blue Jeans, and Nakapagtataka.

== History ==
In 2001, Jim Paredes, who was then leading the anti-Erap group Artista Para sa Pagbabago ng Pilipinas alongside Leah Navarro, Joey Reyes, Maan Hontiveros; attended the Second EDSA Revolution along with Behn Cervantes, then OPM President Mitch Valdez, Pinky Marquez.

=== Leaked masturbation video ===
In April 2019, following Paredes' public remarks critical of then president Rodrigo Duterte, calling the latter "immoral" for cursing in presidential speeches, Paredes attracted controversy after a video that showed him masturbating was leaked in social media, assumed to have been done so by the person whom he was having videocall sex with. After initially denying the video's authenticity, he later admitted that he was the one in the video and apologized for said video. Duterte later mocked Paredes for having a small penis.

== Filmography ==
=== Film ===
- EDSA 1986: Mga Tinig ng Himagsikan (2006)
- Must Date The Playboy (2015) ... Andy Andres
- I'm Drunk, I Love You (2017) ... Dio's father
- Di Ako lsa Ba Nyo (2019)

=== Television ===
Paredes' most prominent television appearances include:

- Sa Linggo nAPO Sila (1990-1995) - Host
- Tatak Pilipino (1990-1994) - Host
- 'Sang Linggo nAPO Sila (1995-1998) - Host
- Search for the Star in a Million (2005) - Judge
- Pinoy Dream Academy (2006) - Headmaster
- Maalaala Mo Kaya (Episode: "Kalapati", 2010) - Don Pepe
- Pilyang Kerubin (2010) - Ronaldo Esteban
- A Beautiful Affair (2012) - Stephen Saavedra
- Pyra: Ang Babaeng Apoy (2013) - Don Del Fierro
- Give Love On Christmas Presents: The Exchange Gift (2014) - ????
- FPJ's Ang Probinsyano (2021) - PGen. Eduardo Singson (Chief of PNP)

== Bibliography ==
- Humming in My Universe: Random Takes on Everything
- Between Blinks
- Writing on Water
- As Is Where Is

== Discography ==
- Ako Lang (1996)
- Laro (2011)
