= Aksyon Dabaw =

Regional newscast on TV5 Davao

- Also known as: Aksyon Alerto Davao (May 9, 2011 - May 2, 2014)
- Created by: TV5 Network
- Developed by: News5
- Presented by: Mikey Aportadera; Gem Avancena-Arenas
- Country of origin: Philippines
- Original language: Cebuano
- No. of episodes: n/a (airs daily)

Production
- Running time: 30 minutes

Original release
- Network: TV5
- Release: May 5, 2014 – September 8, 2016

Aksyon Dabaw is a regional newscast of TV5 in Davao City, which premiered on May 5, 2014. It is the second Aksyon regional edition opposite Aksyon Bisaya, the flagship regional newscast of TV5 Cebu Channel-21. It airs every Monday to Friday at 3:45 pm over TV5 Davao Channel-2 and AksyonTV-29 Davao. It is anchored by Mikey Aportadera and Gem Avancena-Arenas. The newscast is simulcast on radio through Radyo 5 101.9 News FM Davao.

On September 8, 2016, Aksyon Dabaw (after 2 years) as Aksyon Alerto Davao and Cebu's Aksyon Bisaya were cancelled due to cost-cutting measures by the network to sustain its day-to-day operations. Although the newscast ended, the reporters and camera crew remained employed and continued to give reports for Aksyon newscast seen nationally on TV5.

== Final anchors ==
- Mikey Aportadera
- Gem Avancena-Arenas
- Robert Teo - Segment anchor for "Aksyon Weather" and "Today in History"

== Final reporters ==
- Paolo Anota
- Mike Pasco
- Lerma Alingalan
- Irene dela Cruz

== See also ==
- Aksyon
