= Danny Javier =

Filipino singer (1947–2022)

- Born: Daniel Morales Javier; August 6, 1947; Abuyog, Leyte, Philippines
- Died: October 31, 2022 (aged 75) Quezon City, Philippines
- Genres: Pop; OPM
- Occupations: Singer, songwriter, actor, television host, and businessman
- Years active: 1969–2018

Daniel Morales Javier (August 6, 1947 – October 31, 2022), better known simply as Danny Javier (Tagalog: [ˈdanɪ habˈjɛɾ]), was a Filipino singer, songwriter, actor, television host and businessman. He was known as one of the members and lead vocalist of the musical trio Apo Hiking Society along with Boboy Garrovillo and Jim Paredes, wherein he was the oldest of the group. He is regarded as one of the pillars and icons of Original Pilipino Music (OPM).

Javier coined the term "OPM" ("Original Pinoy Music", "Original Philippine Music", "Original Pilipino Music"), originally referring to the Music of the Philippines and Philippine pop songs, particularly ballads, and any musical composition created by a Filipino that became popular in the Philippines during the late '70s. The term continued to be used in following decades to refer to Filipino music popular in those decades.

Javier's compositions include "Show Me a Smile" (1976), "Pag-ibig" (1978), "Lumang Tugtugin" (1978), "Pumapatak ang Ulan" (1978), "Kaibigan" (1978), "Doo Bidoo" (1978), "Kabilugan ng Buwan" (1980), "Princesa" (1980), "Blue Jeans" (1981), "Salawikain" (1982), "Kumot at Unan" (1983), "Di Na Natuto" (1985), "Awit ng Barkada" (1991), "Just a Smile Away" (1992), "Isang Dangkal" (1999), and his last composition, "Lahat Tayo" (2022).

== Career ==
Javier began his musical career in the late 1960s. He was already dabbling in performing solo and with other groups when he enrolled at the Ateneo de Manila University for college. He became part of a singing group named Danny, Mandy, and Alice, with Mandy Marquez and Alice Zerrudo. In 1970, Javier met Jim Paredes, Boboy Garrovillo, Ric Segreto, and 9 other original members of the Apolinario Mabini Hiking Society or known today as Apo Hiking Society. Although he was a latecomer to the group, remember the members had been together since high school and in some cases, even grade school, Danny instantly became the lead vocalist. The group was formed and had its fledgling beginnings in 1969 at the Ateneo de Manila High School. After graduation, the majority of its members left to pursue individual careers, with only three members remaining, made up of Javier, Paredes, and Garrovillo.

In the span of their professional career, Apo Hiking Society emerged as a principal adherent of the musical movement termed Original Pilipino Music (OPM), a term coined by Javier, a milieu in which their original musical contributions and cultural influence became essential. He became involved in record production, talent management and organizing artists under the Organisasyon ng Pilipinong Mang-aawit (O.P.M., acronym translation: "Organization of Philippine Singers/musicians"). The group expanded its activities into establishing and furthering the careers of new OPM artists in the Philippines.

As a television actor, Javier was part of different shows and movies such as Kung Mangarap Ka't Magising (1977), Kakabakaba Ka Ba? (1980), Blue Jeans (1981), and I Do Bidoo Bidoo: Heto nAPO Sila! (2012). Javier, with Paredes and Garrovillo, managed to host their own shows such as Sa Linggo nAPO Sila (They Are Now On Sunday), a Philippine musical-variety show that aired on ABS-CBN from December 3, 1989, to January 29, 1995, replaced by the first Talent Singing competition show Tawag ng Tanghalan from 1987–1989, and 'Sang Linggo nAPO Sila (They Are Now On All Week), a Philippine daily noon-time variety show of ABS-CBN that aired from January 28, 1995, to November 28, 1998, replacement of Eat Bulaga! and followed by Magandang Tanghali Bayan or MTB.

To date, the Apo Hiking Society has released 27 albums and hundreds of songs over a career spanning four decades. Two hugely successful tribute albums were produced in 2006 and 2007 by its management group, featuring numerous young bands reinterpreting APO's expansive repertoire, included many hit songs such as "When I Met You", "Panalangin", "Batang-Bata Ka Pa", "Yakap Sa Dilim", "Pumapatak Ang Ulan", "Ewan", "Handong Ng Pilipino Sa Mundo", "Awit Ng Barkada", "Mahirap Magmahal Ng Syota Ng Iba", "Paano", "Pag-ibig", "Nakapagtataka", "Di Na Natuto", "Show Me A Smile", "Blue Jeans", "Tuyo Na'ng Damdamin", "Kumot At Unan", "Kaibigan", "Sa'n Na Nga Ba'ng Barkada Ngayon", "Bawat Bata", "Princesa", "American Junk", "Lumang Tugtugin", "Salawikain", "Doo Bidoo", and many among others.

In 2010, the Apo Hiking Society, composed of Javier, Paredes, and Garrovillo decided to retire as a group after 41 years of activity. They performed a series of farewell concerts that started on February 14, 2010, and ended in May, just in time for the elections. In 2018, He retired from both singing and acting.

== Personal life and death ==
Born in Abuyog, Leyte, Javier was the son of Leonardo "Andok" Javier Sr. of Leyte and brother of comedian George "Dyords" Javier, former actor turned photographer and government official Jimmy Javier, and former Javier, Leyte mayor and incumbent Leyte vice governor Leonardo "Sandy" Javier Jr., who also owns the Andok's Litson Corporation food chain. He attended San Beda University and Ateneo de Manila University. Sandy’s children—singer-actress Mica Javier, television personality Nikka Javier (an ex-housemate from Pinoy Big Brother: Teen Edition 4), and Jam 88.3 radio DJ Jobim—are Javier’s nieces and nephew. The latter was part of Eto Na! Musikal nAPO, a musical adaptation based on the first tribute album Kami nAPO Muna.

As a businessman, Danny Javier also had T-shirt venture called Pidro: Ang Saplot Ng Bayan, based on Pidro, a character he created about a man from the rural areas of the Philippines who came to Manila seeking good fortune. Pidro was selected as the official shirt of the Philippine Centennial celebrations in 1998.

Javier resided in General Santos and had been visiting the United States on a regular basis. Javier had a near-death experience in 2011 and was a survivor of kidney failure, pneumonia, emphysema, heart failure, hepatitis, diabetes and sepsis. He later became an advocate of moringa as a traditional and alternative medicine.

Javier openly supported the candidacy of Rodrigo Duterte in the 2016 Philippine presidential election, while he supported Leni Robredo in the 2022 Philippine presidential election.

Javier died of complications due to a prolonged illness at the National Kidney and Transplant Institute on October 31, 2022, at the age of 75, as confirmed by his daughter Justine.

He was later cremated at Heritage Park, Taguig City on Nov 06, 2022.

== Discography ==
=== As main artist ===
- "American Junk" (written by Jim Paredes)
- "Ang Nobyang Kong Sexy" (written by Jose Mari Chan)

=== As songwriter ===
- "Awit ng Barkada"
- "Blue Jeans" (co-written with Jim Paredes)
- "Di Na Natuto" (performed by Gary V., later covered by APO and Noel Cabangon)
- "Doo Bi Doo"
- "Isang Dangal"
- "Just a Smile Away" (Javier's second and last English composition, performed by Jaime Garchitorena)
- "Kaibigan"
- "Kumot at Unan" (later covered by Richard Poon and Noel Cabangon)
- "Lahat Tayo" (Javier's last composition before his death in 2022)
- "Lata ang Aming Tambol" (Javier's first original Tagalog Christmas song)
- "Lumang Tugtugin"
- "Pag Ibig"
- "Princesa"
- "Pumapatak ang Ulan"
- "Salawikain"
- "Show Me a Smile" (Javier's first original English composition)
- "Suntok sa Buwan"

== Selected filmography ==
=== Television ===
- Tawag ng Tanghalan (1987–1989)
- Islands Gamemasters (1989)
- Sa Linggo nAPO Sila (1989–1995)
- Sang Linggo nAPO Sila (1995–1998)
- Vilma On Seven (1993)
- Maynila (2005)
- Philippine Idol (2006)
- Celebrity Duets Season 1 (2007) - performer
- Pinoy Idol (2008)
- Talentadong Pinoy (2009) - judge
- It's Showtime (2010) - guest celebrity judge
- Bangis (2011)
- Power House (2012)
- News Café (9TV, 2013)
- Tunay na Buhay (2013)
- ASOP: A Song of Praise Season 3 (2014) - guest judge
- Matanglawin (2014)
- Boys Ride Out! (2015)
- Aha! (2015)
- Sabado Badoo (2015) - cameo featured footage
- Gandang Gabi Vice (2015)
- Tonight With Boy Abunda (2016)
- Family Feud (2016)
- Full House Tonight (2016)
- Sunday Pinasaya (2017)

== See also ==
- Apo Hiking Society
  - Jim Paredes
  - Boboy Garrovillo
