= Ala Paredes =

Filipino model, activist and writer

- Born: Angela Nadine Mabanta Paredes; April 17, 1983 (age 43); Pasadena, California, U.S.
- Other name: Ala Paredes
- Education: Ateneo de Manila University
- Occupation: Correspondent
- Years active: 2001–present
- Employer: ABS-CBN Global
- Known for: Environmental activist, vocalist, TV personality, model
- Spouse: John Buencamino (m. 2015)
- Parent: Jim Paredes (father)
- Website: ala-ism.pansitan.net

Angela Nadine Mabanta Paredes (born April 17, 1983), professionally known as Ala Paredes, is an American-born, Australia-based Filipino environmental activist, artist and writer, who at various times in her career was also a TV host, VJ, commercial model, and vocalist for Filipino alternative band Hiraya. Since moving to Australia, she has become one of the correspondents covering Australia for the Philippines' ABS-CBN News & Current Affairs.

== Early life and education ==
Paredes was born in California and raised in Manila. She is the daughter of singer Jim Paredes of the APO Hiking Society. As a toddler, she displayed her talents in drawing.

Paredes graduated from high school in 2000 at the School of the Holy Spirit (SHSQC), a private, all-girls Roman Catholic school in Quezon City. Before going to college, she took a pre-college course at the University of Oxford. She then moved on to the Ateneo de Manila University, where she received her Bachelor of Arts in Communication in 2004.

== Career ==
=== Career in the Philippines ===
==== Modeling and activism ====
She first ventured into modeling in her junior year in college at the age of 19, doing a TV commercial for a popular facial wash (Johnson and Johnson), and was soon endorsing a clothing line (Penshoppe).

In her first forays as a television personality, doing television ads, she quickly became a recognizable figure, distinguished by her morena (malay brown) complexion and curly hair, a sharp contrast to the traditional look of models at the time. The Philippine Center for Investigative Journalism took note of her unusual success and said:

Model Ala Paredes has curly hair in a country where long, straight hair is considered the epitome of female beauty.... In an industry that prizes fair skin and straight hair, her morena skin color and loose, voluptuous curls are considered unconventional.

At around the same time, Paredes began blogging regularly, with her blog soon becoming popular and earning her a reputation as a celebrity blogger – a role she would later use to promote environmental issues just as her father, well known for his advocacies, did before her. She had also been vocal about how martial law affected her family.

==== Media work in the Philippines ====
Paredes' modeling career soon burgeoned into a television career. She continued modelling occasionally but became a regular VJ for ABS-CBN's music channel Myx, and then later the host of IslaMusik, a television show on ABC 5 featuring a musicians from all over the Philippines. She also often served as a presenter at numerous events.

==== Hiraya vocalist ====
In 2005, Paredes became the frontwoman of a Pinoy rock band called Hiraya when the original vocalist left. Guitarist Mark Verzo, bassist Marco Cuneta on bass, and drummer Paulo Tomas recruited her to become the replacement vocalist. The band had already released an EP, with their previous vocalist, when Ala took over. She stayed with the band until a short time before she moved to Australia with her family in 2006. She didn't do music again after that experience until several years later she learned how to play the ukulele to cope with postpartum depression.

=== Move to Australia ===
In 2006, the Paredes family decided to migrate to Australia – a decision which Jim Paredes explained was related to a desire for greater personal development. Initially she rejected the move, but a sailing trip convinced her to try something new.

The move generated some controversy when a copyeditor for a prominent Philippine newspaper wrote a headline that said Mr. Paredes, known for his activism, was "giving up on the Philippines." Both Jim and Ala Paredes protested that this was a miscategorization of their family's motives for moving. The paper eventually apologized to the Paredes family for the original, inaccurate headline of the article. Mr Paredes later said that he "felt bad not so much that people misread me as a person (that's hurtful, yes) but more so that they may slip deeper into despair by such a false story. That's the last thing we need," and Ala expressed similar sentiments.

Initially she struggled adjusting to life in Australia. She struggled finding work as she lacked experiences in the country, but was soon able to find a job as a barista, where Filipino tourists would sometimes recognize her.

==== Media work and further studies ====
In the same year that the Paredeses moved to Australia, she was recruited by ABS-CBN Global, the international multi-platform media company of Filipino media giant ABS-CBN, to be a correspondent for Balitang Australia, a weekly news and feature program catering specifically to Filipino Australians.

Paredes later decided to take up an illustration course from the Sydney Design Institute, graduating in December 2009.

==== Ampatuan trial sketch artist ====
Upon graduation, Paredes served as the official courtroom sketch artist at the trial of Andal Ampatuan Jr., the prime suspect in the Maguindanao massacre. Paredes had gone on vacation in the Philippines to spend the holidays with relatives, when a friend of hers who worked at the Supreme Court of the Philippines called about an open position for a courtroom sketch artist at the Ampatuan trial. Courtroom sketches were needed because media coverage at the trial was restricted.

Describing the moment, she said that she “immediately called my friend back 10 seconds after receiving her message and accepted the offer. We did not talk about the (pay).” Noting the importance of the case, she said that “At a time when the nation is still grieving, I feel like this is my way of getting involved,” and “I thought this is my own way of giving public service, especially when media can’t be there.”

==== Artwork and other ventures ====
In 2013, Paredes opened her first solo exhibit. In 2017, she took part in an exhibition showcasing contemporary Filipino art with the piece "Power Pose".

Paredes is currently a freelance writer, having written for Vogue Philippines, Rappler, and SBS Australia. In 2018, she starred in a SBS short film Tomgirl. She also appeared on a podcast on SBS titled 'Let Me Tell You'. She is also an English as a Second Language (ESL) teacher.

== Personal life ==
In 2015, Paredes married John Buencamino in a non-traditional wedding ceremony. They have two daughters, Zadie and Aurelia. In 2019, she suffered from a miscarriage.
