= Cheryl Cosim =

Filipino journalist

Cheryl Cosim-Alvarez
- Born: Cheryl Kathleen Cosim; February 7, 1974 (age 52); Dagupan, Pangasinan, Philippines
- Occupations: News anchor; radio commentator; TV host
- Years active: 1996–present
- Organization: Plan Philippines
- Spouse: John Francis Alvarez (m. 2010)

Cheryl Kathleen Cosim-Alvarez (Tagalog: [ˈʃɛɾil ˈkɔsim]; born February 7, 1974) is a Filipino journalist, news anchor and TV host, who has appeared on ABS-CBN News and Current Affairs and News5.

== Career ==
Cosim began her career as a journalist at ABS-CBN News and Current Affairs, hosting the programs Magandang Umaga, Pilipinas, Salamat Dok, the hourly news updates, and Gising Pilipinas on DZMM. After 14 years at ABS-CBN, she joined News5, the news department of TV5 as an on-air presenter in summer 2010. Cosim became the co-anchor of Aksyon with Erwin Tulfo. In 2014, she became the news anchor on the late-night newscast Aksyon Tonite, first with Paolo Bediones and later with Martin Andanar following Bediones' resignation from the show.

In 2016, Cosim joined Aksyon sa Umaga together with Mel Sta. Maria (who replaced Andanar) and Erwin Tulfo.

Cosim currently heads the network's morning program, Perfect Mornings, the afternoon newscast One Balita Pilipinas, the primetime newscast Frontline Pilipinas, alongside Julius Babao, and the public service radio program, Sagot Kita.

== Personal life ==
Cosim is married to John Francis Alvarez, a businessman who used to reside in the United States.

== Filmography ==
=== Television ===
Year	Title	Role
1996–2007	Alas Singko y Medya	Host
1996–2001	Balitang K	Reporter
2005–2010	News Patrol	News anchor
2004–2010	Salamat Dok	Host
2010–2020	Alagang Kapatid	Host
2010–2014; 2017–2018	Aksyon	News anchor; relief anchor for Cruz-Valdes
2011–2012	Sapul sa Singko	Host
2012	Insider	Host
2012–2014	Good Morning Club	Host
2014	Numero	Host
2014–2019	Aksyon Tonite	News anchor
2016–2017	Aksyon sa Umaga	News anchor
2017	Reaksyon	Substitute anchor for Cruz-Valdes
2019–2020	Sa Totoo Lang	Host
2019–present	One Balita Pilipinas	News anchor
2020–present	Frontline Pilipinas	News anchor
2021–2022	All Politics is Local	Co-host
2021–2022	KandidaTalks	Host
2022	Bilang Kandidato	Host
2026–present	Perfect Mornings	Host
2026	Gud Morning Kapatid	Substitute host

== Radio ==
Year	Title	Role
2006–2009	Gising Pilipinas	News anchor
2011–2012	Diretsahan	Host
2014–2016	Healthline with Cheryl Cosim	Host
2015–2020	Alagang Kapatid	Host
2017–2019	Serbisyong Kapatid	Host
2019–2020	Early All Ready	Co-Host
2019–2023	Perfect Morning	Host
2019–2020	Sa Totoo Lang	Co-Host
2023–present	Sagot Kita!	Host

== Awards ==
Gawad Tanglaw

- 2014 - Best Female News Program Anchor

KBP Golden Dove (Kapisanan ng mga Brodkaster ng Pilipinas)

- 2013 - Best Female Newscaster

Inding-Indie Short Film Festival

- 2015 - Most Outstanding Broadcaster Asian Media Award
- 2016 - Best News Anchor
