= Cherie Mercado =

Filipino journalist

- Born: Cherie Lei Ariza Mercado; Manila, Philippines
- Occupations: Journalist, Radio Commentator
- Years active: 1994–2016, 2018–2019
- Agent(s): GMA Network (1994–1995); ABS-CBN (1995–2004); ABC/TV5 (2004–2016); CNN Philippines (2018–2019); Filipino TV (?–present)
- Spouse: Mike Santos (m. 2004)
- Children: 2

Cherie Mercado-Santos is a Filipino broadcast journalist. She has worked for various broadcast networks in the Philippines, the longest with TV5, and is currently based in Canada.

== Career ==
Mercado's career as a news anchor, reporter, researcher, and eventually as a live on-the-scene reporter began with GMA News (1994–1995) and then ABS-CBN News (1995–2004). With ABS-CBN, Mercado hosted morning show Alas Singko Y Medya (lit. Five-Thirty, for the show's airtime), The Global News, the health and weather segment of Magandang Umaga Bayan (Good Morning to the Nation), and her own lifestyle show on ANC, Coffee Talk with Cherie Mercado. As a reporter, she covered the EDSA II Revolution and the May 1 riots. After nine years with ABS-CBN, she signed with ABC/TV5 (2004–2016).

In 2011, together with Shawn Yao and Cheryl Cosim, Mercado served as one of TV5's special correspondents for the wedding of Prince William and Catherine Middleton, reporting live from London.

Mercado was the anchor for several news programs. She was the co-anchor of the late-night newscast Aksyon JournalisMO (Action: Your Journalism) together with Jove Francisco and Martin Andanar. She was the host and anchor for CNN Konek, which aired on AksyonTV, and starting in 2012 was the co-anchor of the late newscast Pilipinas News (P-News), together with Francisco and Paolo Bediones. Mercado was also one of several co-hosts of the news documentary series Insider, along with Cosim, Bediones, Andanar, Luchi Cruz-Valdes, Raffy Tulfo, Erwin Tulfo, Mike Templo, and Lourd de Veyra.

She and Bediones also co-hosted Trabaho Lang with Paolo and Cherie (Just Work with Paolo and Cherie), which aired every weeknight on Radyo5, 92.3 News FM from 8:00-9:30pm.

In July 2014, Mercado was moved to the noontime newscast Aksyon sa Tanghali (Action at Noon) together with Raffy Tulfo.

On July 15, 2016, Mercado left TV5, her home network for 12 years to become the spokesperson of the Department of Transportation (DOTR). She later resigned in May 2017 due to her motherhood.

On February 12, 2018, Mercado joined CNN Philippines, as she took over as a new anchor of the Evening Edition of Newsroom replacing Mitzi Borromeo. On September 3, 2018, Mercado moved to mid-morning Filipino newscast Newsroom Ngayon.

Mercado and her family moved to Canada in 2021 in order to give her children a specialized arts education. There she began working at Filipino TV, a channel targeted at Filipinos in Canada. Her programs with Filipino TV include Thrive in Canada, which introduces services and resources to new immigrants, and The Hub Daily, a news roundup show. In 2023, she hosted The Cherie Mercado Podcast, which features conversations between Mercado and another Filipino living or working in Canada. On September 20, 2025, she received the Excellence Award in Media at the Golden Balangay Awards, a recognition for outstanding Filipino-Canadians.

== Personal life ==
Mercado is married to Mike Santos, a stockbroker, and they have two children, Christiana and Anabella.

== Filmography ==
=== Television ===
Year	Title	Role
1995–2004	The Weekend News	News Anchor
1996–2001	Hoy Gising!	News Anchor (substitute for Gel Santos-Relos)
1996–2001	Balitang K	Reporter
1998–2001	Global News	News Anchor
2001–2004	Alas Singko Y Medya (now Magandang Umaga Bayan)	Host
2001–2003	Coffee Talk with Cherie Mercado	Host
2004–2008	Big News	News Anchor
2008–2010	TEN: The Evening News	News Anchor
2010	Aksyon Weekend	News Anchor
2010–2012	Aksyon JournalisMO	News Anchor
2010–2011	Sapul sa Singko	Host
2011–2013	CNN Konek	News Anchor
2012	Insider	Host
2012–2014	Pilipinas News	News Anchor
2014–2016	Aksyon sa Tanghali	News Anchor
2018	Newsroom	News Anchor
2018–2019	Newsroom Ngayon	News Anchor
2018–2019	CNN Philippines Updates	Various Contributor
2019	CNN Philippines The Filipino Votes: Senatorial Forum	Co-Moderator

== Radio ==
- Trabaho Lang! (2013–2014; 2015–2016)
