= Jove Francisco =

Filipino journalist

- Born: Jovenal Mapalo Francisco Jr.
- Occupations: Journalist, News Producer
- Years active: 1994–present

Jovenal Mapalo Francisco Jr. is a Filipino broadcast journalist in the Philippines.

== Career ==
Among 17 other journalists from different international media organizations including CNN, Jove Francisco is the only Filipino reporter to be accepted as a fellow in the Journalist to Journalist (J2J) program of the AIDS Vaccine 2011 Journalist Training Program Fellows by the Washington-based National Press Foundation held recently in Bangkok.

He has been covering health and politics for 15 years, spanning four administrations from Ramos to Aquino. He was an anchor for TV5's late night newscast Pilipinas News and AksyonTV's Balitang 60.

His name was mentioned by then-Rep. Gilbert Remulla during the congressional investigation on the "Hello Garci" controversy for his TV reports.

On October 10, 2015, according to a Media Newser Philippines' report, Jove has transferred to ABS-CBN.

On April 25, 2018, Francisco joined Cignal TV's One News.

In October, Francisco was promoted as officer-in-charge of One News, replacing Patrick Paez who was named new head of News5.

== Filmography ==
=== Television ===
Year	Title	Position
2020–present	Short Take	Host
2019–present	Sa Totoo Lang	Co-Anchor
2019–2023	Wag Po!	Co-Host
2018–present	One News Now	Various Contributors
2018–present	The Chiefs	Executive Producer
2016	#NoFilter	Executive Producer
2015–2016	The World Tonight	Executive Producer
2014–2015	Aksyon Tonite	News Anchor / Segment Presenter
2012–2014	Pilipinas News	News Anchor
2011–2012	Anggulo	Correspondent
2011–2014	Balitang 60	News Anchor
2010–2012	Aksyon JournalisMO	News Anchor
2010–2013	Aksyon Weekend	News Anchor
2008–2010	TEN: The Evening News	News Anchor

== Radio ==
Year	Title	Character
2019–2023	Wag Po!	Co-Host
2019–present	Sa Totoo Lang	Co-Host
