= Aksyon Bisaya =

- Created by: TV5 Network
- Developed by: News5
- Presented by: Glenn Anthony Soco; Atty. Georgia Herrera
- Opening theme: "Aksyon Theme" by Jimmy Antiporda & Ria Tanjuatco-Trillo (2011-2016)
- Country of origin: Philippines
- Original language: Cebuano
- No. of episodes: n/a (airs daily)

Production
- Running time: 30 minutes

Original release
- Network: TV5 Cebu
- Release: July 18, 2011 – September 8, 2016

Aksyon Bisaya was a regional newscast of TV5 in Cebu City. It aired every weekdays at 3:45 PM over TV5 Cebu Channel-21, AksyonTV-29 Cebu and pre-empted Movie Max 5 and game days of the PBA. It was anchored by Glenn Anthony Soco and Atty. Georgia Herrera. The newscast was simulcast on radio through Radyo 5 101.9 News FM.

== History ==
The newscast premiered as the first regional version of Aksyon on July 18, 2011, with Atty. Ruphil Bañoc and Darlanne Sino Cruz as the pioneering anchors of the newscast. As part of the launch, TV5 upgraded the facilities in Cebu by constructing a new transmission site in Mount Busay and renovations in their studio in Capitol Road. In April 2013, Atty. Frank Malilong, Jr. and Atty. Georgia Hererra were named as new anchors of Aksyon Bisaya, replacing Bañoc, who had conflict of interest on his contract with RMN DYHP Cebu and Sino Cruz, who remained focus on her business. Malilong resigned from anchoring the newscast in May 2014, and was later replaced by Cebu entrepreneur Glenn Soco.

In September 2015, Aksyon Bisaya lost three of its reporters, Dennis Tanoc, Andrea Pateña, and King Anthony Perez, after they accepted the Special Limited Voluntary Separation Program offer given by the TV5's higher-ups.

On September 8, 2016, Aksyon Bisaya (after 5 years) and Davao's Aksyon Dabaw were cancelled due to cost-cutting measures by the network to sustain its day-by-day operations. Although the newscast has ended, the reporters and cameramen remain employed and they have continued to file reports for the Aksyon newscast seen nationally on TV5 and for Radyo5.

== Final anchors ==
- Glenn Anthony Soco
- Atty. Georgia Herrera
- JP Lao (Showbiz Aksyon anchor)

=== News manager ===
- Titus Borromeo (formerly with ABS-CBN - Cebu, ABS-CBN - Cagayan de Oro, ABS-CBN - Dumaguete and DYRC - CBC)

=== Desk editor/Researcher ===
- Madine Sabang
- Julit Jainar

=== Final reporters ===
- Jinky Bargio (ABS-CBN Davao/Bombo Radyo Davao/RPN Davao)
- Rey Pasaporte (Banat News/DYBB)
- Lesley Caminade-Vestil (The Freeman and Banat News/DYLA)
- Ryan Sorote (The Freeman/DYRC-MBC)

=== Former anchors and reporters ===
- Atty. Ruphil Fernandez Bañoc (now with DYHP RMN Cebu and CCTN)
- Darlanne Sino-Cruz
- Arnold Bustamante
- Katreena Bisnar
- Noreen Tormis
- Atty. Frank Malilong, Jr.
- Andrea Pateña
- Dennis Tanoc (GMA Cebu Production/SugboTV)
- King Anthony Perez

== See also ==
- Aksyon
