= 'Sang Linggo nAPO Sila =

Philippine noontime variety show

- Genre: Variety show
- Created by: ABS-CBN Studios
- Developed by: ABS-CBN Studios
- Directed by: Danni Caparas; Victor de Guzman
- Presented by: Apo Hiking Society
- Country of origin: Philippines
- Original language: Tagalog/Filipino
- No. of episodes: 1,183

Production
- Production locations: Delta Theater, Quezon City, Philippines (1995-1997); Studio 3, ABS-CBN Broadcasting Center, Quezon City, Philippines (1997-1998)
- Camera setup: Multicamera set-up
- Running time: 90 minutes (weekdays); 150 minutes (Saturdays)

Original release
- Network: ABS-CBN
- Release: February 4, 1995 – November 28, 1998

Related
- Sa Linggo nAPO Sila

'Sang Linggo nAPO Sila (They Are Now On All Week) is a Tagalog-language Philippine television variety show broadcast by ABS-CBN. Hosted by Apo Hiking Society, it aired from February 4, 1995 to November 28, 1998, replacing Eat Bulaga! and replaced by Magandang Tanghali Bayan.

== History ==
=== First year ===
'Sang Linggo nAPO Sila started its first live broadcast from the ABS-CBN Delta Theater on February 4, 1995. The core hosts from the previous show Sa Linggo nAPO Sila (led by the Apo Hiking Society) were initially joined by various ABS-CBN contract artists on a twice-weekly basis, until the show established its own core of regular hosts committed to appear on a daily basis.

It garnered high ratings most especially in provinces and cities where ABS-CBN had superior signal. But the real challenge for 'Sang Linggo was the show's content itself as it tried to veer away from the usual noontime format of slapstick humor and various talent portions that its predecessor (and formerly a competitor on GMA Network) Eat Bulaga! (now on TV5) (which added Allan K., Francis Magalona, Jose Manalo, Donna Cruz, and others to its roster of hosts as well) had presented to its viewers. Eventually, the show decided to compete for viewership by coming up with various game and talent portions as their answer to their rival show's own segments. Among the portions that were popular to its viewers on its initial year were "Conan the Beautician", "Hibangers", "Pop-Pinoyan", "Princess Asia", and the highlight game portion "Sarimanok Sweepstakes".

Soon after, 'Sang Linggo nAPO Sila became the avenue to showcase talent and introduce new stars. The likes of Rico Yan, Bojo Molina and Matthew Mendoza were introduced to the public as regular co-hosts. The show's rotating comedy sketch segments won loyal following out of new star combinations like the comic duos of John Estrada and Manilyn Reynes, Roderick Paulate and Jun Encarnacion, and Redford White and Norman Mitchell. The biggest contribution however of the show to the noontime scene was the musical portion "Doon Po sa Jammin'" where the most popular and upcoming Pinoy rock bands were featured.

=== Second year: Top-rating status and downfall ===
In the show's second year, it launched "Calendar Girl", a pageant segment for girls aged 15–21 years old. The segment injected a "sexy" element to the show but won over a new fanbase. The noontime show also introduced "Barangay APO", a segment where host Eagle Riggs goes on live remote telecast on a selected barangay and gives out many prizes in cash and kind. The said segment brought 'Sang Linggo nAPO Sila to the number one spot in the noontime slot in Mega Manila. But the show's popularity declined when Eat Bulaga! introduced "Super SiReyna", a transgender beauty pageant. Due to the success of "Super SiReyna" in 1996, it brought Eat Bulaga! back to the top spot as well as other new segments that capture the attention of its viewers.

=== Third and final year ===
'Sang Linggo nAPO Sila barely celebrated its third year on Philippine TV when the show suddenly suffered in the ratings game. The show was moved from Delta Theater to Studio 3 of ABS-CBN Broadcast Center at that time in 1997. With Eat Bulaga! continuing to thrill the noontime viewing public with "Super SiReyna", "Kaserola ng Kabayanan", and "Philippine Bulaga Association", the staff decided to give its still-popular segment "Calendar Girl" a more bolder, naughtier approach. The question-and-answer portion was now handled by the newly established trio of John Estrada, Randy Santiago and Willie Revillame. Their delivery of naughty jokes on national TV was met with mixed reactions. At the same time, the show unveiled its own game portion "APO Cash ng Bayan" which gave out many cash prizes. The ratings improved a bit with the changes but it reportedly did not sit well with some of the original hosts of the show. The show was in danger of cancellation and went its final airing on November 28, 1998, when co-hosts Randy Santiago, John Estrada and Willie Revillame went on to become the main hosts of the network's new noontime show Magandang Tanghali Bayan that aired Mondays to Fridays.

=== Sabado Live ===
The Apo Hiking Society was able to keep the Saturday noontime slot via the musical variety show "Sabado Live" which premiered on December 5. 1998. They were joined by Agot Isidro, G. Toengi, Mo Twister, Ara Mina and Lara Fabregas. The show's format was similar to their previous Sunday variety show Sa Linggo nAPO Sila. However with "MTB" posting higher ratings after adding the phenomenal segment "Pera o Bayong" later before the year ended, ABS-CBN management decided to cancel "Sabado Live" and extend "MTB"'s run to Saturday. Sabado Live's final show aired on February 20, 1999.

== Legacy ==
'Sang Linggo nAPO Sila garnered high ratings from the start of its airing but it was not able to overtake Eat Bulaga! permanently, but it did gain popularity in regions where GMA's signals were weak and ABS-CBN's signals were stronger. The show also introduced many new talents to television. Some of the show's new talents would eventually make their mark in show business as box-office stars and acclaimed artists (recording, film and TV) despite Eat Bulaga's reported clout and power in the showbiz industry.

However, despite the show's initial advocacy to "clean up" the noontime slot and become the viewer's alternative choice, the management eventually decided that the show must go head-on with Eat Bulaga!. The all-out "noontime network war" escalated as the staff and fans of both warring noontime shows accused each other of copying segments.

The downfall of the show was blamed on the humor being "too intelligent for the average Filipino" as the management tried to request the show's hosts to tone down on jokes (mostly political) that only a few would understand. Apparently, ABS-CBN was looking for a bigger version of its competitor in the noontime slot. After the axing of "APO", succeeding Kapamilya noontime shows would feature younger set of hosts with the same "street humor" inspired by their competitors.

== Hosts ==
=== Main hosts ===
- Danny Javier
- Jim Paredes
- Boboy Garovillo

=== Co-hosts ===
- Manilyn Reynes (1995–1998)
- Kris Aquino (1995–1996)
- Agot Isidro (1995–1998)
- Amy Perez (1995–1998)
- Pops Fernandez (1995–1996)
- Michelle van Eimeren (1995–1998)
- Lara Melissa de Leon (1995–1998)
- Bing Loyzaga (1995–1998)
- Gelli de Belen (1996–1998)
- Aiko Melendez (1996–1998)

=== Extended hosts ===
- John Estrada (1995–1998)
- Roderick Paulate
- CJ Ramos
- Randy Santiago (1998)
- Willie Revillame (1998)
- Ai-Ai delas Alas (1998)
- Judy Ann Santos
- Claudine Barretto
- Rico Yan (1996–1998)
- Kristine Hermosa
- Jolina Magdangal (1997–1998)
- Rica Peralejo
- Giselle Toengi (1998)
- Ruffa Gutierrez
- Carmina Villarroel
- Mark Vernal
- Bojo Molina (1996–1998)
- Ara Mina
- Matthew Mendoza (1996–1997)
- Anjo Yllana
- Jun Encarnacion
- Eagle Riggs
- Rannie Raymundo
- Giselle Sanchez
- Jon Santos
- Bayani Agbayani (1996–1998)
- Redford White (1995–1998)
- Norman Mitchell
- Solidgold Dancers
- Winnie Cordero
- Joy Viado
- Joji Isla
- Dinky Doo, Jr.
- Whitney Tyson
- Sammy Lagmay
- Cynthia Patag
- Beverly Salviejo
- Joseph Montalvo
- Christien John Gonzales
- David Bermudez
- Bentong
- Mat Ranillo III
- Voice Unlimited

== Segments ==
- Calendar Girl
- Hibangers
- Princess Asia
- Barangay APO
- ABS-CBN Sarimanok Sweepstakes
- Ricollection
- Little Dreamboy
- Made na Made Na!
- Doon Po sa Jammin'
- Hataw ng Tanghalan
- Fantasya Festival
- Ngiting Unique, Ngiting Panalo (1996–1997)
- APO Cash ng Bayan
- Dahil Tanging Ikaw Sing-a-like Contest (1996)
- Dunkin' Lafe
- Ginoong Pilipinas
- Star Kid
- Mader Dear
- 'Wag Isnabin
- Showgirl 2000
- Expo Pilipino Bingo
- Mula sa Puso ni Esperanza (1997)
- Lakas Pinoy
- Boo! Yey!
- Showbiz I.Q.
- Boys Watch/Babes Watch
- ABS-CBN Sarimanok III
- Christmas Course 2000
- Papa's Boy, Papa's Girl
- Coca-Cola Red Hot Summer
- Coca-Cola Always Time For Million
- Coca-Cola Always Time Panalo
- San Miguel Beer AFFORDaboys! ₱9 na lang! Nationwide Raffle Promo
- Letra'To
- Little April Boy
- Hibangers Standard Appliances Edition
- Wish Upon A Mega Mula Sa APO
- Nescafe Grand Celebration, Grand Prizes (1998)

== Personnel ==
=== Directors ===
- Danni Caparas
- Victor de Guzman

== See also ==
- Eat Bulaga!
- Magandang Tanghali Bayan
- Wowowee
- It's Showtime
- List of programs broadcast by ABS-CBN
