= Sapul sa Singko =

Philippine defunct morning television show

- Also known as: Sapul!
- Created by: ABC Development Corporation
- Developed by: News5
- Directed by: Irco Cornel (Sapul sa Singko); Mark Linchoa (Kumare Klub)
- Presented by: see Hosts
- Opening theme: "Sapul sa Singko" by Patricia Fernandez
- Country of origin: Philippines
- Original language: Filipino
- No. of episodes: Aired weekdays

Production
- Executive producers: Icy Luzano (Sapul sa Singko); Aida Salamat (Kumare Klub)
- Camera setup: Multiple-camera setup
- Running time: 3 hours

Original release
- Network: TV5
- Release: April 5, 2010 – February 3, 2012

Related
- Good Morning Club; Aksyon sa Umaga; Frontline sa Umaga; Gud Morning Kapatid

Sapul sa Singko (English: Bullseye on Five), formerly Sapul (English: Bullseye) is a Philippine television news broadcasting and talk show broadcast by TV5. Originally hosted by Erwin Tulfo, Martin Andanar, Lourd de Veyra, and Shawn Yao, it aired from April 5, 2010 to February 3, 2012, and was replaced by Good Morning Club. Andanar, de Veyra, Yao, Tawanan, Atty. Mike Templo, Chiqui Roa-Puno, Paolo Bediones, Amy Perez, Lia Cruz, Ariel Villasanta, Pat Fernandez, and Christine Bersola-Babao. serve as the final hosts.

== History ==
Sapul first aired on TV5 on April 5, 2010 as the network's answer to ABS-CBN's Umagang Kay Ganda and GMA's Unang Hirit. Erwin Tulfo, Martin Andanar, Lourd de Veyra, and Shawn Yao started the show as the original hosts.

On October 25, 2010, Sapul was rebranded and retitled as Sapul sa Singko with fresh and hip OBB and graphics and the addition of two new cast members- Chiqui Roa-Puno (who later became a Congresswoman) and Atty. Mike Templo, the weekend news anchor at that time. The new OBB marked the return of the official theme song of TEN: The Evening News, entitled "Astro" by Radioactive Sago Project, and the program running time of two hours was extended to three hours, beginning at 5am and ended at 8am every weekday.

On November 8, 2010, the main news portion of the show began its simulcast on radio thru Radyo5 92.3 News FM in Mega Manila for thirty minutes from 5:30 to 6 am.

On February 21, 2011, Sapul sa Singko started its simulcast on AksyonTV.

On September 5, 2011, Sapul sa Singko cut the time from 3 hours to 2 hours to give way to its spin-off show Kumare Klub which also hosted by Amy Perez, Chiqui Roa-Puno, and Christine Bersola-Babao.

In September 2011, Paolo Bediones joined the cast as a replacement for Erwin Tulfo.

On February 3, 2012, Sapul sa Singko aired its final episode due to eventual reprogramming and to give way for Good Morning Club. It continued to have its regional version (Balita ha Singko (TV5 Tacloban) until 2014.)

== Hosts ==
=== Main hosts ===
- Martin Andanar
- Chiqui Roa-Puno
- Lourd de Veyra
- Shawn Yao
- Atty. Mike Templo
- Paolo Bediones
- Amy Perez
- Lia Cruz
- Christine Bersola-Babao

=== Segment hosts ===
- Ferdinand "Makata Tawanan" Clemente
- Benjie "Tsongkibenj" Felipe
- Chinkee Tan
- Pat Fernandez
- Ariel Villasanta

=== Former hosts ===
- Erwin Tulfo
- Cherie Mercado

== Segments ==
- Sapul sa Singko
  - Word of the Lourd
  - Makata on the Spot
  - Rapido Meals
  - Love Hurts
    - Tibok ng Bayan
  - Gwaping in the Morning
  - Active Mornings
  - Poging Balita
  - Balitang Sapul
    - Tinamaan ng Sapul
    - Balitang Iba Pa
    - Probinsyang Sapul
    - Sports Sapul
    - Sapul Around the World
    - Showbiz Chis-Mwah
    - Traffic Sapul
  - Alagang Kapatid
  - Talo-Panalo
  - Usapang Sapul
  - Aksyon Weather
- Kumare Klub
  - Angel Rowda On The Go
  - Chiqui Chiqui Dance
  - Fashionistang Mudra
  - Kumare Chika
  - Kumare Tips
  - Luto Na Ba T'yang?
  - OK Ka Lang?
  - Pera Pera Lang
  - ParenTin

== See also ==
- List of TV5 (Philippine TV network) original programming
- List of programs broadcast by One Sports
