= Joseph Ubalde =

Filipino online journalist and web trainer (1986–2019)

- Born: Mark Joseph Ubalde; 8 January 1986; Philippines
- Died: 1 April 2019 (aged 33); Bonifacio Global City, Taguig, Philippines
- Employer: GMA News TV

Joseph Ubalde or Mark Joseph H. Ubalde (8 January 1986 – 1 April 2019) was a Filipino online journalist and web trainer.

== Biography ==
He used to be the weather presenter for TV5's morning show, Good Morning Club, as well as Andar ng mga Balita, Aksyon News Alerts, and Balitang 60. He also headed News5 Everywhere as its content manager from 2013–2016 and was responsible for increasing its visibility online. He won two online journalism awards for his articles on absentee mothers and overseas Filipinos.

Before working for TV5, he was a Senior News Producer for GMANewsTV and briefly worked for VERA Files under his former teachers from the University of the Philippines - Diliman.

He was discovered dead in the bathroom of his hotel room in Bonifacio Global City on April 1, 2019. He had been battling depression, having been clinically diagnosed with it in 2016. He also made a video about the condition one evening in late March, before his death.
