= Gud Morning Kapatid =

Philippine morning television show

- Genre: News broadcasting; Talk show
- Created by: TV5 Network Inc.
- Directed by: Carby Salvador
- Presented by: Maoui David; Chiqui Roa-Puno; Dimples Romana; Ted Failon; Czarina "DJ Chacha" Guevara; Andrei Felix; Angela Lagunzad-Castro
- Opening theme: "El Verano" by Declan DP (Remix) (2023–26)
- Country of origin: Philippines
- Original language: Tagalog

Production
- Executive producer: Maria Corazon Llosala
- Production locations: Studio 5, TV5 Media Center, Mandaluyong, Metro Manila, Philippines
- Camera setup: Multi-camera setup
- Running time: 150 minutes
- Production company: News5

Original release
- Network: TV5
- Release: June 19, 2023 – August 7, 2026

Related
- Sapul sa Singko; Good Morning Club; Aksyon sa Umaga; Frontline sa Umaga

Gud Morning Kapatid (transl. Good Morning Sibling, stylized as Güd Morning Kapatid) is a Philippine television news and talk show produced by TV5. Originally hosted by Justin Quirino, Gretchen Ho and Jes delos Santos, it aired on the network's Gandang Mornings line up from June 19, 2023 to August 7, 2026. Maoui David, Chiqui Roa-Puno, Dimples Romana, Ted Failon, Czarina "DJ Chacha" Guevara, Andrei Felix, and Angela Lagunzad-Castro serve as the final hosts. It airs from Monday to Friday, 5:30 am to 8:00 am (PHT), on TV5 and its livestreaming channels; with simulcast on RPTV from 6:00 am PHT. From October 21, 2024 to August 7, 2026, the show hooks up the first newscast segment from Ted Failon at DJ Chacha sa True FM, which airs on True Network outlets and affiliates (except DXET-FM Davao).

== History ==
In October 2023, Maoui David, Chiqui Roa-Puno and Dimples Romana joined the show.

On October 21, 2024, the network announced a major revamp in its daytime programming, with Gud Morning Kapatid moving its timeslot to 5:30 a.m., and extending to 2½ hours, directly competing for the first time with other morning shows. Angela Lagunzad-Castro, Andrei Felix (a holdover from FSU) and Dr. Val Gadiaza joined the show upon the relaunch; Hannibal Talete was initially added as segment host, but his Hanni ng Bayan segment was later quietly taken off the show. The radio tandem of Ted Failon and Czarina “DJ Chacha” Guevara also joined the show, contributing the newscast segment of Ted Failon at DJ Chacha sa Radyo5 (later renamed as Ted Failon at DJ Chacha sa True FM), which is hooked up on TV5 from 6:30 to 7:00 a.m., marking the partial return of the radio program's simulcast on the channel after it was halted on May 3, 2024. The change also marked the restart of the morning show's simulcast on RPTV, which used to be partially simulcast since the channel's first broadcast on February 1; albeit simulcasting only from 6:00 to 8:00 a.m., and may subject to pre-emptions due to live sports coverage commitments that the channel may carry between the said two-hour period. It also marks Felix and Cabal's return to the timeslot formerly occupied by the defunct CNN Philippines-produced New Day.

The program ended on August 7, 2026, after three years, to give way to the third iteration of Frontline sa Umaga, with all the hosts of GMK remained and with addition of Ed Lingao.

== Hosts ==
=== Final hosts ===
- Chiqui Roa-Puno (2023–26)
- Maoui David (2023–26)
- Dimples Romana (2023–26)
- Angela Lagunzad-Castro (2024–26)
- Ted Failon (2024–26)
- Czarina "DJ Chacha" Guevara (2024–26)
- Andrei Felix (2024–26)

=== Substitute hosts ===
- Mon Gualvez
- Maricel Halili
- Nikki de Guzman
- Ruth Cabal

=== Former hosts ===
- Gretchen Ho (2023)
- Jes delos Santos (2023–24 as a main host; 2024–26 as a substitute host)
- Justin Quirino (2023–24)
