= CNN Konek =

- Genre: News magazine
- Created by: TV5 Network, Inc. Turner Entertainment
- Developed by: News5
- Written by: Odette Bachoco; Nikolai Dino; Arvic Tolentino
- Directed by: Benedict Carlos
- Presented by: Cherie Mercado
- Country of origin: Philippines
- Original language: Filipino
- No. of episodes: n/a (aired daily)

Production
- Executive producer: April Espejo
- Running time: 30 minutes

Original release
- Network: AksyonTV
- Release: February 28, 2011 – August 30, 2013

Related
- CNN International

CNN Konek, roughly translated as CNN Connected, is a Philippine television news broadcasting show broadcast by AksyonTV. Anchored by Cherie Mercado, it aired from February 28, 2011 to August 30, 2013. The program aired every Monday to Friday from 9:30 p.m. to 10:00 p.m. (PST).

== Final anchors ==
- Cherie Mercado

== Final substitute anchors ==
- Shawn Yao
- Roices Naguit

== Final segments ==
- Balitang Hollywood
- World at a Glance
- Video of the Day
- Balitang Health
- Balitang Techie
- Banda Rito

== See also ==
- CNN International
- CNN Philippines
- News5
- List of programs broadcast by One Sports
