= Renz Ongkiko =

Renzie Ongkiko
- Born: Lorenzo Herman Rosales Ongkiko; July 22, 1988 (age 38); Mandaluyong, Philippines
- Education: Diliman Preparatory School, De La Salle University, Manila
- Occupations: Marketing executive Former journalist
- Years active: 2011–present
- Agent: TV5
- Known for: AksyonTV
- Children: 1
- Relatives: Shehyee (brother)

Lorenzo Herman Rosales Ongkiko (born July 22, 1988, in Mandaluyong, Philippines), better known for his stage name Renz Ongkiko is a Filipino marketing executive, former newscaster, media personality and model. Renz served News5 as a media personality and news anchor

== Biography ==
Lorenzo Ongkiko was born and raised in Mandaluyong, Philippines on July 22, 1988. Completed his high school in Diliman Preparatory School in Quezon City and pursued a college degree in Mass Media at De La Salle University.

He is widely known as a news broadcaster in AksyonTV on TV5.

He currently serves as marketing manager for Ducati in the Philippines.

== See also ==
- Paolo Bediones
- Hermes Bautista
