= Sa Linggo nAPO Sila =

Philippine variety show

- Title card
- Genre: Variety show
- Created by: ABS-CBN Broadcasting Corporation; Amy Perez; Apo Hiking Society
- Developed by: ABS-CBN Broadcasting Corporation; Apo Hiking Society
- Directed by: Johnny Manahan
- Presented by: Apo Hiking Society
- Country of origin: Philippines
- Original language: Filipino
- No. of episodes: 326 (airs Sundays)

Production
- Production locations: Studio 2 & 3, ABS-CBN Broadcasting Center, Quezon City, Philippines
- Running time: 150 minutes

Original release
- Network: ABS-CBN
- Release: December 3, 1989 – January 29, 1995

Related
- 'Sang Linggo nAPO Sila

Sa Linggo nAPO Sila (They Are On This Sunday/It's Sunday with APO) is a Philippine television variety show broadcast by ABS-CBN. Hosted by Apo Hiking Society, it aired from December 3, 1989 to January 29, 1995, replacing Tawag ng Tanghalan and was replaced by ASAP.

== Cast ==
=== Apo Hiking Society ===
- Danny Javier
- Jim Paredes
- Boboy Garovillo

=== Co-hosts ===
- Agot Isidro (1989–1995)
- Amy Perez (1989–1995)
- Ariel Rivera (1991–1995)
- Bing Loyzaga (1989–1995)
- Jun Encarnacion (1990–1995)
- Lara Melissa de Leon (1989–1995)
- Ilonah Jean (1989–1995)
- Star Querubin
- Eagle Riggs
- Ronniel Mendoza (1991–1994)
- Rene Requiestas (1990–1993)
- Solidgold Dancers
- Street Boys
- Adrenalin Dancers
- Michael Segovia
- Jam Morales (1990–1995)
- Katherine de Leon Vilar (1989–1995)

=== Segments ===
- Cleene Premyo Sa Rolyo
- Koleksyon OPM
- Sarimanok Sweepstakes
- Mr. Cupido
- KaBarangay Dance Showdown
- Star Quest (The Nationwide Campus Singing Competition: 1990–1995)
- Patuluyin ng Swerte
- Ang Puso ay Panalo sa Batang San Miguel Beer

== Critical response ==
In March 1992, Angela Stuart Santiago of the Manila Standard denigrated the show's lack of professionalism, stating that "Jim, Danny, and Boboy rarely know the lyrics of the songs they sing; often their numbers with guests and female co-hosts turn out like amateur karaoke affairs, out of tune and out of synch [sic]."

== See also ==
- 'Sang Linggo nAPO Sila
- List of programs broadcast by ABS-CBN
