= Good Morning Club =

Philippine defunct morning television show

- Final titlecard from October 14, 2013, to July 18, 2014
- Genre: Talk show
- Created by: ABC Development Corporation
- Developed by: News5
- Directed by: Mark Limchoa
- Presented by: see Hosts
- Country of origin: Philippines
- Original language: Filipino
- No. of episodes: n/a (airs daily)

Production
- Executive producer: Icy Luzano
- Camera setup: Multiple-camera setup
- Running time: 90 minutes

Original release
- Network: TV5
- Release: February 6, 2012 – July 18, 2014

Related
- Sapul sa Singko; Aksyon sa Umaga; Frontline sa Umaga; Gud Morning Kapatid

Good Morning Club is a Philippine television news broadcasting and talk show broadcast by TV5. Originally hosted by Paolo Bediones, Martin Andanar, Cheryl Cosim, Chiqui Roa-Puno, Shalala, Lucky Mercado, Amy Perez, Maka Tawanan, Christine Bersola-Babao and April Gustillo, it aired from February 6, 2012 to July 18, 2014, replacing Sapul sa Singko and was replaced by Aksyon sa Umaga. Andanar, Cosim, Grace Lee, Lourd de Veyra, Twink Macaraig, Tuesday Vargas, Ina Zara, Trish Roque, Laila Chikadora, Jun Sabayton, and Mon Gualvez. serve as the final hosts. This show aired every Mondays to Fridays, 5:30 to 7:00 AM (PST), and was also simulcast with AksyonTV.

== History ==
Good Morning Club title card used from February 6, 2012, to October 11, 2013

Good Morning Club began airing on February 6, 2012, as a merger of two morning shows, namely Sapul sa Singko and Kumare Klub. Originally aired from 5:00-7:30 am, the program later cut its airing to two hours (from 5:00-7:00 am) and expanded to three hours (from 5:00-8:00 am) in 2013. It simulcasted on AksyonTV, as well as on Radyo5 92.3 News FM from 5:30-6:00 am.

On October 14, 2013, as part of the launch of the network's Everyday All the Way campaign, the show underwent a reformat where it implemented a "4-in-1" format consisting of Good Morning, Grace (which was later axed), Good Morning Sir!, Good Morning Girls and Good Morning, MamuTin!. At the same time, the program was also shortened to two hours (from 6:00-8:00 am), then expanded to 2 hours and 30 minutes (from 5:30-8:00 am).

Good Morning Club aired its final episode on May 2, 2014, and was replaced by its former segment, Good Morning Ser, which began on May 5.

=== Cancellation ===
The final airing of Good Morning Ser was on July 18, 2014, and was replaced by the first of four editions of the network's flagship news program Aksyon, Aksyon sa Umaga, which began on July 21.

== Final hosts ==
- Cheryl Cosim (Good Morning Girls)
- Martin Andanar (Good Morning Sir!)
- Grace Lee (Good Morning Girls and Good Morning, Grace)
- Christine Bersola-Babao (Good Morning, MamuTin!)
- Lourd de Veyra (Good Morning Sir!)
- Twink Macaraig† (Good Morning Girls)
- Tuesday Vargas (Good Morning Girls)
- Ina Zara (Mobile 5)
- Trish Roque (Mobile 5)
- Laila Chikadora (Mobile 5, Traffic Na Ba? and Aksyon Weather)
- Jun Sabayton (Chickang Bayaw)
- Mon Gualvez

== Former hosts ==
- Erwin Tulfo
- Paolo Bediones
- Amy Perez
- Edu Manzano
- Chiqui Roa-Puno
- Pat Fernandez
- Lucky Mercado
- Shalala
- Makata Tawanan
- April Gustillo
- Joseph Ubalde

== Final segments ==
- Good Morning Sir
  - Hitlist
  - Presinto 5
  - Now Showing
  - Mobile 5
  - Punto Asintado
  - Traffic Na Ba?
  - Aksyon Weather
  - Chikang Bayaw
  - Love Hurts
- Good Morning Girls
  - Talkathon
- Good Morning MamuTin

== Former segments ==
- Morning Balita
  - Headlines
  - Presinto 5
  - Probinsya Balita
  - Caught In The ACT
  - Aksyon Weather
  - Globalita
  - Neti-Sense
  - Morning Traffic
  - Feature News
  - Teknolohiyang Balita
  - Sports News
  - Kumare at Your Service
- Chiz-Mwah
- Isyu
- Makata Adventures
- OK Ka Lang?
- Chiqui Dance
- Luto Na Ba T'yang?
- Kumare Tips
- What the Fact?

== See also ==
- List of TV5 (Philippine TV network) original programming
- List of programs broadcast by One Sports
