= Amy Perez =

Filipino TV host and presenter

Amy Perez-Castillo
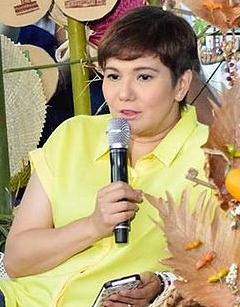
- Perez in 2015
- Born: Maria Armida Parale Perez; September 5, 1969 (age 56); Quezon City, Philippines
- Occupations: Host, actress
- Years active: 1986–present
- Agents: Star Magic (1997–2006); Backroom Inc. (2006–present)
- Spouses: Brix Ferraris (m. 1995; ann. 2014) Carlo Castillo (m. 2014)
- Children: 3
- Relatives: Lorna Tolentino (cousin); Zsa Zsa Padilla (cousin)

YouTube information
- Channel: FunFunTyangAmy
- Years active: 2018–present
- Genres: Travel; Lifestyle; Comedy
- Subscribers: 617,000
- Views: 21.6 million
- Last updated: June 23, 2023

Maria Armida "Amy" Parale Perez-Castillo (Tagalog: [ˈʔamɪ ˈpɛrɛs kasˈtiljo]; born September 5, 1969), also known as Tiyang Amy or Tyang Amy, is a Filipino television and radio presenter. Noted for her strong opinions and distinct brand in hosting, she has since established herself as a dependable figure in morning and noontime variety shows. Among the shows she presented or co-hosted include Family Kuarta o Kahon (1986), Eat... Bulaga! (1988), Sa Linggo nAPO Sila (1989), 'Sang Linggo nAPO Sila (1995), Magandang Tanghali Bayan (1998), M.R.S. (2005), Kabuhayang Swak na Swak (2006), Face 2 Face (2010), The Singing Bee (2013) Umagang Kay Ganda (2013) and It's Showtime (2016). She has received a selection of accolades for her work such as five PMPC Star Awards for Television including two wins for "Best Female TV Host" and three Alta Media Icon Awards.

== Career ==
Perez' earliest big-time gig was co-hosting the noontime variety programs Family Kuarta o Kahon (1986–1990), Eat Bulaga! (1989–1995), Sa Linggo nAPO Sila (1990–1995), 'Sang Linggo nAPO Sila (1995–1998), and Magandang Tanghali Bayan from 1998 until she left in 2002. After two years of absence from variety shows, she was chosen to be one of the hosts for the morning talk-variety show M.R.S.

As an actress, Perez portrayed diverse roles in both television and film. Notable performances include her role as Anne in Anak ni Baby Ama and appearances in Flavor of the Month alongside Joey Marquez and Alma Moreno. These films showcased her comedic talent, earning her recognition. Perez received critical acclaim for her portrayal of Helen in the Robin Padilla-starrer Sa Diyos Lang Ako Susuko. She also featured in Petrang Kabayo 2: Ang Ganda-Ganda Ko, Palibhasa Lalake, Ipagpatawad Mo, Tigasin, and Pera o Bayong (Not da TV).

On the television front, Perez took on roles in dramas such as Sa Dulo ng Walang Hanggan (Mirriam), Habang Kapiling Ka (Divine Ogata), and Ikaw sa Puso Ko in 2004. She also appeared in two episodes of Komiks in 2006: Alpha Omega Girl and Agua Bendita. Additionally, she starred in the horror flick Matakot Ka sa Karma, directed by Jose Javier Reyes, playing the role of Myrna in the segment entitled Kama.

Her television appearances extended to Love Spell in 2007, where she featured in the episode Shoes ko po, Shoes ko Day! and I've Fallen for You, portraying the character Ninang Beth. In 2019, Perez became the celebrity endorser for Belo Medical Clinic.

== Personal life ==
Perez and musician Brix Ferraris share a son named Adi. She is also a cousin of veteran actress Lorna Tolentino. Despite filing for annulment from Ferraris, her request was denied by the Supreme Court. However, their marriage was annulled in October 2014. Subsequently, Perez entered into a relationship with radio host Carlo Castillo, with whom she has a son, Kyle born in 2008. In 2012, she confirmed her pregnancy, expecting her second child, Seyah with Castillo, and announced a one-year leave from Face to Face.. Perez and Castillo married on November 12, 2014.

== Filmography ==
=== Film ===
Year	Title	Role
1984	Campus Beat	Annie
1987	Jack & Jill	Bridesmaid
1988	Bobo Cop	
1989	Sa Diyos Lang Ako Susuko	
1990	Anak ni Baby Ama	Anne
1990	Flavor of the Month	
1990	Sa Diyos Lang Ako Susuko	Helen
1990	Petrang Kabayo 2 (Anong Ganda Mo! Mukha Kang Kabayo)	Marianne
1991	Ipagpatawad Mo	
1991	Kaputol ng Isang Awit	Margaux Vicencio
1991	Darna	
1994	Nag-iisang Bituin	
1994	Oo Na, Sige Na	Nina Bermudez
1995	Batang-X	
1999	Gimik: The Reunion	
1999	Tigasin	
2000	Pera o Bayong: Not da TV	Lola/Host
2006	Matakot Ka sa Karma	Myrna
2007	I've Fallen for You	Ninang Beth
2010	Si Agimat at si Enteng Kabisote	Ina Magenta
2011	Enteng Ng Ina Mo	Ina Magenta
2012	Si Agimat, si Enteng Kabisote at si Ako	Ina Magenta

=== Television ===
Year	Title	Role
1986–1990	Family Kuarta o Kahon	Herself / Co-host
1988–1995	Eat Bulaga!	Herself / Co-host
1987–1998	Palibhasa Lalake	Amy / Amelia
1987–1988	Kalatog Pinggan	Herself / Co-host
1990–1995	Sa Linggo nAPO Sila	Herself / Host
1995–1998	'Sang Linggo nAPO Sila	Herself / Host
1998–2003	Magandang Tanghali Bayan	Herself / Host
2001–2002	Sa Dulo ng Walang Hanggan	Mirriam Dela Rosa
2002	Wansapanataym: Ang Pilyo at Ang Pilya	Susan
2002	Wansapanataym: Kambing-Alone	
2002	Wansapanataym: Enchanted Trees	
2002–2003	Habang Kapiling Ka	Divine Ogata
2004	Ikaw sa Puso Ko	Various
2004	Leya, ang Pinakamagandang Babae sa Ilalim ng Lupa	Maruba
2004	Wansapanataym: Esep-Bata	
2004	Wansapanataym: Home Sweet Home	
2004–2005	Diretsahan	Herself / Host
2005	M.R.S.	Herself / Host
2006–2010	Kabuhayang Swak na Swak	Herself / Host
2007–2010	A.M.Y. (About Me & You)	Herself / Host
2006	Love Spell: Shoes Ko Po, Shoes Ko Day!	Various
2006	Gulong ng Palad	Lorraine Pineda
2009	Only You	Emily
2010–2013	Face to Face	Herself / Host
2010–2011	Juicy!	Herself / Guest
2010–2012	Untold Stories Mula sa Face to Face	Herself / Host
2010–2012	Sapul sa Singko	Herself / Host
2012–2013	Ang Latest	Herself / Host
2012–2013	Good Morning Club	Herself / Host
2013–2020	Umagang Kay Ganda	Herself / Host
2013–2015	The Singing Bee	Herself / Host
2014–2023	Sakto	Herself / Host
2016–present	It's Showtime	Herself / Host
2023	Unang Hirit	Herself / Guest
2023–2024	Kasalo	Herself / Host
2024	Family Feud (Philippine game show)	Herself / Guest
2024–present	Ako 'To Si Tyang Amy	Herself / Host

=== Radio shows ===
Year	Title	Ref(s)
1989–1991	Amy Perez on Radio Romance 101.9	
	Ah OA (Amy and Hans On-Air)	
2006–2010	A.M.Y. (About Me & You)	
2014–2020	Sakto	
2023–2024	Kasalo	
2024–present	Ako 'To Si Tyang Amy	

== Awards and nominations ==
Award	Year (Note: Indicates the year of ceremony. Each year is linked to the article about the awards held that year, wherever possible.)	Nominee / Work	Category	Result	Ref.
Alta Media Icon Awards	2016	Umagang Kay Ganda	Best Morning Show Host	Won	
Alta Media Icon Awards	2017	Umagang Kay Ganda	Best Morning Show Host	Won	
Alta Media Icon Awards	2018	Umagang Kay Ganda	Best Morning Show Host	Won	
Anak TV Seal Awards	2023	Amy Perez	Net Makabata Star	Won	
EdukCircle Awards	2013	Umagang Kay Ganda	Best Talk Show Host	Won (Note: Tied with Ryzza Mae Dizon.)	
Gawad Pilipino Icon Awards	2022	Sakto	Outstanding Female TeleRadyo Host of the Year	Won	
Jeepney TV Fan Favorite Awards	2022	It's Showtime	Favorite Musical/Variety Show Host	Nominated	
Nwssu Students' Choice Awards	2023	Sakto	Best Female Morning Show Host	Won	
Paragala Central Luzon Media Awards	2019	Umagang Kay Ganda	Best Female Morning Show Host	Won	
PMPC Star Awards for Television	1999	Magandang Tanghali Bayan	Best Female TV Host	Won	
PMPC Star Awards for Television	2007	Kabuhayang Swak Na Swak	Best Educational Program Hosts (Shared with Uma Khouny and Chase Tinio.)	Nominated	
PMPC Star Awards for Television	2008	Kabuhayang Swak Na Swak	Best Educational Program Hosts (Shared with Uma Khouny.)	Nominated	
PMPC Star Awards for Television	2009	Kabuhayang Swak Na Swak	Best Educational Program Hosts (Shared with Gilbert Remulla.)	Nominated	
PMPC Star Awards for Television	2012	Good Morning Club	Best Morning Show Hosts (Shared with Good Morning Club hosts.)	Nominated	
PMPC Star Awards for Television	2012	Kumare Klub	Best Morning Show Hosts (Shared with Christine Bersola-Babao and Chiqui Roa-Puno.)	Nominated	
PMPC Star Awards for Television	2012	Face to Face	Best Public Affairs Program Hosts	Nominated	
PMPC Star Awards for Television	2013	Good Morning Club	Best Morning Show Hosts (Shared with Good Morning Club hosts.)	Nominated	
PMPC Star Awards for Television	2013	Face to Face	Best Public Affairs Program Hosts (Shared with Gelli de Belen.)	Nominated	
PMPC Star Awards for Television	2014	The Singing Bee	Best Game Show Hosts (Shared with Roderick Paulate.)	Nominated	
PMPC Star Awards for Television	2015	Umagang Kay Ganda	Best Morning Show Hosts (Shared with Umagang Kay Ganda hosts.)	Nominated	
PMPC Star Awards for Television	2016	It's Showtime	Best Female TV Host	Nominated	
PMPC Star Awards for Television	2016	Umagang Kay Ganda	Best Morning Show Hosts (Shared with Umagang Kay Ganda hosts.)	Won	
PMPC Star Awards for Television	2017	It's Showtime	Best Female TV Host	Nominated	
PMPC Star Awards for Television	2017	Umagang Kay Ganda	Best Morning Show Hosts (Shared with Umagang Kay Ganda hosts.)	Won	
PMPC Star Awards for Television	2018	It's Showtime	Best Female TV Host	Nominated	
PMPC Star Awards for Television	2018	Umagang Kay Ganda	Best Morning Show Hosts (Shared with Umagang Kay Ganda hosts.)	Nominated	
PMPC Star Awards for Television	2019	It's Showtime	Best Female TV Host	Nominated	
PMPC Star Awards for Television	2019	Umagang Kay Ganda	Best Morning Show Hosts (Shared with Umagang Kay Ganda hosts.)	Won	
PMPC Star Awards for Television	2021	It's Showtime	Best Female TV Host	Won	
PMPC Star Awards for Television	2021	Umagang Kay Ganda	Best Morning Show Hosts (Shared with Umagang Kay Ganda hosts.)	Nominated	
PMPC Star Awards for Television	2023	It's Showtime	Best Female TV Host	Nominated	
Yahoo OMG! Celebrity Awards	2013	Umagang Kay Ganda	Favorite Female TV Host of the Year	Nominated	
