= List of programs broadcast by One Sports =

One Sports (formerly AksyonTV and 5 Plus), is a Philippine free-to-air television network owned by Nation Broadcasting Corporation (NBC) and jointly operated by TV5 Network, Inc., a wholly owned subsidiary of MediaQuest Holdings, Inc. The following is a list of all original television programming by AksyonTV, 5 Plus and One Sports.

== Current original programming ==
=== Sports ===
Title	Premiere
University Athletic Association of the Philippines	March 26, 2022

==== Supplamental ====
Title	Premiere
School Spirit	April 7, 2022
The Bounce	October 16, 2022
Glory Days	March 5, 2023

==== Football ====
Title	Premiere
Philam Life 7s Football League	2019
The Azkals matches	2019

==== Volleyball ====
Title	Premiere
Premier Volleyball League	July 17, 2021
Spikers' Turf	2022

== Former original programming ==
=== Newscasts ===
- Aksyon (2011–19)
- Andar ng mga Balita (2011–14)
- Balitaang Tapat (2011–12)
- CNN Konek (2011–13)
- Good Morning Club (2012–14)
- Sapul sa Singko (2011–12)

=== Documentaries and public affairs ===
- Alagang Kapatid (2011–14)
- Anggulo (2011–12)
- Bitag (2011–12)
- Buhay OFW (2011–19)
- Crime Klasik (2011–13)
- Dokumentado (2011–13)
- Insider (2012)
- Juan Direction (2013–14)
- Reaksyon (2012–14, 2014–17)
- Tutok Tulfo (2011–12)
- USI: Under Special Investigation (2011–12)
- Wanted (2011–12)

=== Informercials ===
- Shop TV (2016–18)

=== Reality ===
- Juan Direction (2013–14)

=== Radyo5 programs ===
- Alagand Kapatid (2015–16, 2017–19)
- Andar ng mga Balita (2011–12)
- Bitag Live (2013–17)
- Cristy FerMinute (2011–19)
- Wanted sa Radyo (2011–19)

=== Sports ===
- Manny Pacquiao Presents: Blow By Blow (2023-2025)

=== Sports-oriented programs ===
- National Basketball Training Center League (NBTC) (2019)

=== Esports ===
- eGG Network (2019–20)
- Road to The Nationals (2019–21)

=== Election coverage specials ===
- Pagbabago 2013
- Bilang Pilipino 2016

as TV5

=== Specials ===
- 2013 FIBA Americas Championship (September 2013)
- 2013 FIBA Asia Championship (August 1–11, 2013)
- 2013 FIBA EuroBasket Championship (September 2013)
- 2014 Winter Olympics (February 8–24, 2014)
- 2014 Incheon Asian Games (September 19 – October 4, 2014)
- 2016 Rio Olympics (August 6–22, 2016)
- 2018 Winter Olympics (February 9–25, 2018)
- 2018 William Jones Cup (July 14–22, 2018)
- 2018 Jakarta-Palembang Asian Games (August 18 – September 2, 2018)
- 2018 Copa Paulino Alcantara Finals (October 27, 2018)
- 2019 Southeast Asian Games (November 30, 2019–December 11, 2019)
- 2019 FIBA Basketball World Cup (August 31, 2019–September 15, 2019)
- 2020 Tokyo Olympics (July 23–August 8, 2021)
- 2022 FIBA Asia Cup (July 12–24, 2022)
- 2021 Asian Women's Club Volleyball Championship (October 1–7, 2021)
- 2021 Asian Men's Club Volleyball Championship (October 8–15, 2021)
- 2021 Copa Paulino Alcantara (November 7–19, 2021)
- 2022 Winter Olympics (February 4–20, 2022)
- 2021 Southeast Asian Games (May 12–23, 2022)
- 2022 AFF Women's Championship (July 4–17, 2022)
- 2022 Asian Women's Volleyball Cup (August 21–29, 2022)
- 2022 FIBA Women's Basketball World Cup (September 22– October 1, 2022)
- 2023 Southeast Asian Games (May 5–17, 2023)
- 2023 FIBA Basketball World Cup (August 25–September 10, 2023)
- 2022 Hangzhou Asian Games (September 23 – October 8, 2023)
- 2024 AVC Women's Challenge Cup (May 22–29, 2024)
- 2024 AVC Men's Challenge Cup (June 2–9, 2024)
- 2024 FIVB Women's Volleyball Challenger Cup (July 4–7,2024)
- 2024 Paris Olympics (July 26 – August 11, 2024)
- 2025 AVC Women's Volleyball Champions League (April 20–27 2025)
- 2025 AVC Women's Volleyball Nations Cup (June 7–14, 2025)
- 2025 AVC Men's Volleyball Nations Cup (June 17–24, 2025)
- 2025 FIBA Women's AmeriCup (June 28– July 6, 2026)
- 2025 FIBA Women's Asia Cup (July 13–20, 2025)
- 2025 FIBA Asia Cup (August 5–17, 2025)
- EuroBasket 2025 (August 27– September 14, 2025)
- 2025 FIVB Men's Volleyball World Championship (September 12–28, 2025)
- 2025 Southeast Asian Games (December 9–20, 2025)
- 2026 Winter Olympics (February 6–22, 2026)
- 2026 AFC Women's Asian Cup (March 1–21, 2026)
- 2026 AVC Women's Volleyball Cup (June 6–14, 2026)
- 2026 ASEAN Championship (July 24–August 26, 2026)
- 2026 Asian University Basketball League (August 2–11, 2026)
- 2026 William Jones Cup (August 14–23 2026)
- 2026 Aichi–Nagoya 2026 Asian Games (September 10–October 4, 2026)
- Davis Cup (2011)
- Glory Kickboxing (2019-2020)
- Formula E (2019)
- Maharlika Pilipinas Basketball League (2023–2024)
- Manny Pacquiao vs. Mario Barrios (July 20, 2025)
- National Cheerleading Championship (NCC) (2019)
- NCAA (Men's Basketball) on AksyonTV
- NCAA March Madness (March 19 – April 8, 2014)
- NFL on One Sports (2017-2019)
- NFL Super Bowl XLVIII (February 3, 2014)
- Philippine Premier League (2019)
- Philippine Secondary Schools Basketball Championship
- Philippine Super Liga (2015-20)
- Super Bowl LIV (February 3, 2020)
- The United Football League (2013-16)
- WNCAA Highlights (2013–14)

=== Special coverages/TV specials ===
- Sinulog Festival (2012–2014)

== See also ==
- TV5
- RPTV (TV channel)
- One Sports (sports division)
- One Sports (TV channel)
- PBA Rush
- List of Philippine television shows
