= DWET-TV =

Television station in Metro Manila, Philippines

TV5 Manila (DWET-TV)
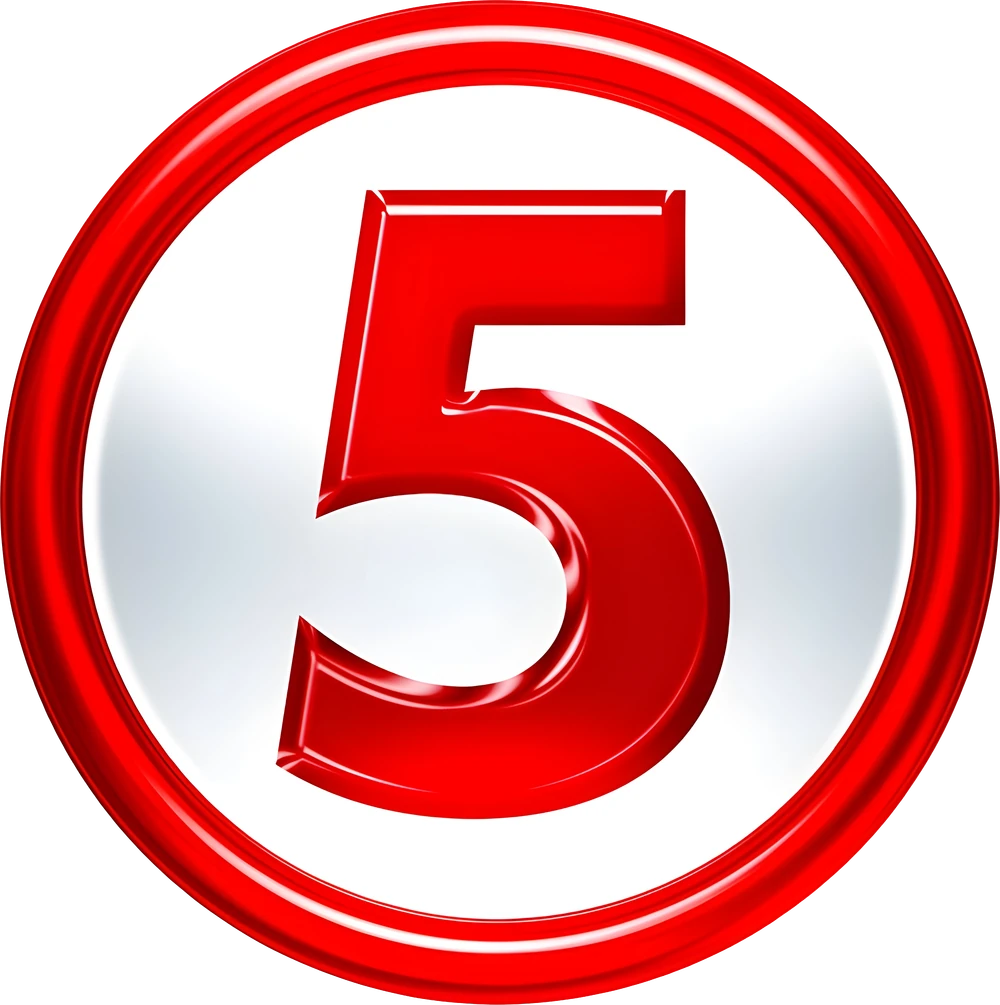
- Metro Manila; Philippines
- City: Quezon City; Mandaluyong
- Channels: Analog: 5 (VHF) (until January 15, 2027); Digital: 18 (UHF) (ISDB-T); Virtual: 5
- Branding: TV5 Manila

Programming
- Language: Filipino (mainly)
- Subchannels: See list
- Affiliations: 5.01: TV5; 5.02: RPTV; 5.03: One Sports

Ownership
- Owner: TV5 Network Inc.
- Sister stations: DZKB-TV (RPTV); DWNB-TV (One Sports); DWLA (105.9 True FM)

History
- Founded: July 1962; 64 years ago (original); February 21, 1992; 34 years ago
- Former call signs: DZTM-TV (1962–1972)
- Former channel numbers: Digital: 42 (UHF) (2014–2015)
- Call sign meaning: DW; Edward; Tan (former owner, deceased)

Technical information
- Licensing authority: NTC
- Power: Analog: 60 kW (50 kW on-operational power output); Digital: 20 kW (channel 18), 5.5 kW (channel 51)
- ERP: Analog: 500 kW; Digital: 75 kW (channel 18)
- Transmitter coordinates: 14°42′19″N 121°2′25″E

Links
- Website: www.tv5.com.ph

DWET-TV (VHF channel 5 Analog, UHF channel 18 Digital) is a television station in Metro Manila, Philippines, serving as the flagship of the TV5 network. It is owned and operated by the network's namesake corporate parent; TV5 also provides certain services to RPTV flagship DZKB-TV (channel 9) and One Sports flagship DWNB-TV (channel 41) under an airtime lease agreement with station owners Radio Philippines Network and Nation Broadcasting Corporation, respectively.

The three stations, alongside flagship radio station True FM 105.9, share studios at the TV5 Media Center, Reliance cor. Sheridan Sts., Brgy. Highway Hills, Mandaluyong. DWET-TV maintains its alternate studios and hybrid analog/digital transmitting facilities (for VHF channel 5 and DTV UHF channel 18) is located at the TV5 Complex, 762 Quirino Highway, Brgy. San Bartolome, Novaliches, Quezon City (sharing facilities with sister station 106.7 Energy FM); while its alternate digital transmitting facility (for DTV UHF channel 51 and DTV channel 18 SFN relay) at the NBC Compound, Block 3, Emerald Hills, Sumulong Highway, Antipolo, Rizal (sharing facilities with sister station 105.9 True FM).

== History ==
=== The First ABC-5 as Associated Broadcasting Corporation (1962–1972) ===
DWET-TV traces its history to DZTM-TV, On June 19, 1960, Joaquin "Chino" Roces, owner of the Manila Times, obtained a radio-television franchise through Republic Act 2945. He established the Associated Broadcasting Corporation (ABC), with the initial studios located along Pasong Tamo in Makati, Rizal (now part of Metro Manila).

ABC's first radio station DZMT, DZTM, and DZWS. After the success of its radio station, the company decided to expand into television ABC Channel 5 began broadcasting in July 1962, the seventh television station in the Philippines (after ABS Channel 3 and CBN Channel 9, which were owned by the Bolinao Electronics Corporation (now ABS-CBN Corporation) which used to operate Channel 2, IBC Channel 13 by the Inter-Island Broadcasting Corporation) and RBS Channel 7 by the Republic Broadcasting System (now GMA Network, Inc.)

On September 23, 1972, President Ferdinand E. Marcos declared martial law, resulting in the forced shutdown of ABC.

=== Sining Makulay, Inc. (1978–1987) ===
ABC's vacated frequency was then utilized in 1978 by Sining Makulay, Inc. (a cable TV firm of Roberto Benedicto who by then already owned RPN, IBC, and BBC) for its cable operations. This lasted until 1987 – a year after People Power revolution deposed Ferdinand Marcos, Sr. (and forced Roberto Benedicto to go into self-exile) – when Corazon Aquino signed Executive Order (EO) No. 205, ending the cable monopoly of and shut down Sining Makulay (a year after it was sequestered by the government), leaving Channel 5 vacant.

=== The Second ABC-5 as Associated Broadcasting Company (1987–2003) ===
After the People Power Revolution in 1986, Chino Roces advocated for the network's reinstatement with President Corazon Aquino. In 1987, Roces applied for a permit with the National Telecommunications Commission and acquired a one hectare property in Barangay San Bartolome, Novaliches, Quezon City. Following Roces' death in 1988, his son Edgardo Roces along with Edward Tan took over efforts to revive the network. They planned to reuse the Makati studios but was dropped since the facilities were outdated and small (Unlike its rival ABS-CBN which partially reused its own complex). Tan and Roces secured approval from the Securities and Exchange Commission to increase capitalization. In 1989, ABC broke ground for the construction of a new studio complex and transmitter tower and reacquired the Channel 5 frequency. In 1990, ABC completed construction of its studio complex and transmitter tower in Barangay San Bartolome, Novaliches, Quezon City. In November 1991, ABC began test broadcasts featuring Japanese documentaries.

On February 21, 1992, at 5 p.m, the network returned to the air. The flagship station adopted the call sign DWET-TV under a new corporate entity as ABC Development Corporation, with Associated Broadcasting Company adopted as on-air and trade name, a nod to its pre-martial law incarnation.

Early in the network's revival, it expanded to Cebu, Davao, Baguio, Naga, Bacolod, Zamboanga, Cagayan de Oro, and General Santos. By the end of 1993, the network ranked third in ratings, with two more stations planned in 1994 ahead of its satellite broadcast launch.

In the 1990s, ABC aired a public service announcement titled Dial His Mother's Number daily at 6:00 pm, before the station ID and, on weekdays, the news program Balitang-Balita. It ran until 2004, after Antonio "Tonyboy" Cojuangco purchased the network and became its CEO.

On February 4, 1994, ABC launched nationwide satellite broadcasting. The network experienced rapid growth under Chief Operating Officer Tina Monzon-Palma. On December 9, 1994, ABC obtained a 25-year legislative franchise through Republic Act No. 7831, which authorized the network to establish and operate television and radio stations countrywide.

In 1998, ABC began airing Three Minutes a Day with Father James Reuter, SJ, a short daily gospel reflection produced by the Family Rosary Crusade that aired from Monday to Saturday. It aired until ABC's final sign-off on August 8, 2008, the day before the network relaunched as TV5.

In 2001, ABC started producing local versions of popular game shows, including The Price Is Right (hosted by Dawn Zulueta), Wheel of Fortune (hosted by Rustom Padilla), and Family Feud (hosted by Ogie Alcasid). The move came during a period of game show popularity among Philippine networks.

In 2001, ABC began airing a daily 3 o'clock Prayer from the Archdiocesan Shrine of the Divine Mercy in Mandaluyong. The segment also ended with ABC's farewell broadcast on August 8, 2008.

=== Cojuangco era (2003–2008) ===
In June 2003, the joint consortium of Tan and Roces sold ABC TV and radio stations to a group led by businessman Antonio "Tonyboy" Cojuangco Jr. Cojuangco, the former chairman of the Philippine Long Distance Telephone Company (PLDT) and owner of Dream Satellite TV and Bank of Commerce, formally acquired the assets in October of the same year. Cojuangco became the president and CEO of ABC, with Jose T. Pardo, a former secretary of the Department of Trade and Industry, serving as the network's board chairman.

Under the new management, changes were made to the news and public affairs division, broadcast equipment was upgraded, and the network acquired broadcast rights for Philippine Basketball Association (PBA) games. Network executives led by Roberto Barreiro coined a new slogan, "Iba Tayo!" ("We're Different!"), replacing "Come home to ABC!". ABC aimed to differentiate itself with fresh programming formats targeting the growing middle- to upper-class youth market. ABC continued to support the Family Rosary Crusade until August 3, 2008, days before its relaunch as TV5. The network featured the religious pre-identification campaign "Please Pray the Rosary" announcement before its programs, although this was gradually phased out during the programming revamp.

In 2005, ABC received the "Outstanding TV Station" award at the 2005 KBP Golden Dove Awards, and several programs on the network also received awards in their respective categories.

In early 2007, ABC implemented budget cuts that mainly affected its news department, resulting in significant layoffs and a diminished capacity for coverage before the 2007 general elections.

In November 2007, ABC launched new sports programming, including NBA basketball, professional boxing, and WWE events, as part of a five-year deal with Solar Entertainment. Due to high costs and poor ratings, the programs were dropped throughout 2008. The NBA review show House of Hoops was cut back and eventually cancelled by April 2008. The PBA, which was previously aired on ABC, did not have its contract renewed and instead found a new home on RPN through a partnership with Solar Entertainment, leading to RPN's privatization by Solar in 2011.

=== First TV5 era (2008–2018) ===
==== ABC-MPB Primedia partnership (2008–2010) ====
In March 2008, Cojuangco announced a partnership between ABC and MPB Primedia Inc., a local company backed by Media Prima Berhad of Malaysia. The partnership was a long-term strategy to enhance ABC's competitiveness in the network wars between ABS-CBN and GMA. MPB Primedia Inc. was established as an asset for Media Prima's proposed private equity fund to invest in media companies in Southeast Asia. Under the agreement, MPB Primedia Inc. produced and sourced entertainment programs, while ABC would continue to be responsible for news programming and station operations. In addition, MPB Primedia was granted rights to schedule and manage sales of ABC-5's airtime. Christopher Sy was appointed CEO of MPB Primedia, Inc., but resigned in January 2009 due to reported differences in management style.

ABC aired its final broadcast at around 22:00 PST on August 8, 2008, with its late-night newscast Sentro as the last program. A countdown to the Network's relaunch followed until 19:00 PST the next day when it officially rebranded as TV5; the TV5 brand was also used as the trade name of MPB Primedia in press releases and station notices, while ABC retained its trade name after the relaunch. The network retained its alternative programming line-up but aimed to cater to "Progressive Pinoys, including those 'young at heart'" to market classes C and D. TV5 also unveiled an upgraded 120-kilowatt stereo TV transmitter. Some ABC programs, such as Shall We Dance, Nick on TV5, Kerygma TV, Light Talk, and Sunday TV Mass, were carried over to TV5's line-up. The TV5 Ani MEGA, a programming block focused on Japanese anime series, was launched on the network.

Under the new management, TV5's audience share increased from 1.9% in the second quarter of 2008 (before the rebranding) to 11.1% in September 2009. That same month, TV5 began airing two hours of Singaporean content produced by MediaCorp's studios division, mainly its Mandarin dramas and English sitcoms, dubbed in Filipino, such as The Little Nyonya starring Jeanette Aw, Darren Lim, Apple Hong and Eelyn Kok, Under One Roof starring Vernetta Lopez, Koh Chieng Mun, Moses Lim, Nicholas Lee and Daisy Irani Subaiah, and Phua Chu Kang Pte Ltd starring Gurmit Singh and Irene Ang.

TV5 continued its partnership with the Family Rosary Crusade, which produced Holy Week specials including Ang Pitong Hapis ni Maria (2009), a Black Saturday special hosted by Father Erick Santos, Buhay ni Kristo (2012), and Sugo and Unos (2014). Its spin-off program Family Matters aired from 2010 to 2016.

==== Acquisition by PLDT, the Kapatid Network years (2010–2018) ====
On October 20, 2009, Media Prima announced its intention to divest its share in MPB Primedia / TV5, along with its affiliated ABC TV stations, and sell it to MediaQuest Holdings, the broadcasting division of PLDT. The decision was driven by the company's losses during the year. The acquisition was completed and officially announced by Chairman Manuel V. Pangilinan on March 2, 2010; he had previously intended to acquire ABC as early as 1999. New programming was introduced through a trade launch at the World Trade Center in Pasay and on April 4, 2010, the network rebranded itself as the "Kapatid" ("sibling") network to compete with ABS-CBN and GMA Network.

On October 1, 2010, TV5 took over the management of MediaQuest's Nation Broadcasting Corporation (NBC) stations. DWFM was relaunched as Radyo5 92.3 News FM (now 105.9 True FM), a TV5-branded news radio station, on November 8, 2010. DWNB-TV was rebranded as AksyonTV, a news channel based on TV5's newscast Aksyon, on February 21, 2011. TV5 outranked GMA Network to become the second most-watched network in key cities in the Visayas and Mindanao regions, including Iloilo, Cebu, Bacolod, Davao, and Cagayan de Oro. The network shared the top spot with ABS-CBN in General Santos.

On December 23, 2013, TV5 began broadcasting from its new headquarters, the TV5 Media Center located in Reliance, Mandaluyong.

In 2014, TV5 acquired the Filipino broadcast rights to the 2014 Winter Olympics, the 2014 Summer Youth Olympics, and the 2016 Summer Olympics.

Despite financial struggles, TV5 remained operational. The network's programming, such as the PBA via Sports5 and the TV5 Kids block, contributed to its popularity. TV5 celebrated its fifth anniversary under the management of Manny V. Pangilinan with a trade launch of 2015 shows at the Sofitel Philippine Plaza on November 26, 2014.

TV5 started each year with a New Year's Eve countdown called Happy sa [year] at the Quezon Memorial Circle, a tradition that continued until 2017.

In 2015, the Network changed its corporate name from ABC Development Corporation to TV5 Network, Inc.

TV5 experienced growing financial difficulties, including losses and debt, primarily due to a reduction in advertisers and the effects of digitalization. This situation led to employee layoffs in September 2015. The network's in-house entertainment division was disbanded, and its Chief Entertainment Content Officer, Wilma Galvante, ended her consultancy agreement. Consequently, TV5's workforce shrank from around 4,000 employees in 2013–2014 to approximately 900 by late 2021.

Unable to produce original content until 2020, TV5 appointed Vicente "Vic" Del Rosario, CEO of Viva Entertainment, as the network's chief entertainment strategist. Changes were implemented in TV5's entertainment programming, including the formation of the Viva-TV5 joint venture Sari-Sari Channel and the outsourcing of Viva Television for entertainment shows. The partnership was announced at a trade launch in Bonifacio Global City, Taguig on November 25, 2015. However, several new shows were cancelled due to a lack of advertising support and poor ratings. TV5 renewed its partnership with Viva Entertainment in October 2020, focusing on local versions of foreign programming and TV remakes of Viva classic films.

From January 2016 until December 31, 2018, TV5 and Cignal, through Hyper, served as the official free-to-air and pay television partners, respectively, for the Ultimate Fighting Championship (UFC) in the Philippines.

In July 2016, TV5 started airing selected programs from MTV and MTV International as part of a deal with Viacom International Media Networks. The new MTV on TV5 block included shows like Catfish, Ridiculousness, and Ex on the Beach.

On September 8, 2016, TV5 cancelled its locally produced programs Aksyon Bisaya and Aksyon Dabaw due to cost-cutting measures. The personnel remained employed to continue filing reports for the national edition of Aksyon.

TV5 President and CEO Emmanuel "Noel" C. Lorenzana stepped down on September 30, 2016, and was replaced by basketball coach and Sports5/D5 Studio head Vicente "Chot" Reyes. Following Reyes' appointment, the Network announced a retrenchment of approximately 200 employees as part of TV5's digitalization efforts.

In April 2017, TV5 acquired the rights to air WWE programming after Fox Philippines decided not to renew its contract with the WWE.

On October 12, 2017, TV5 Network announced its partnership with ESPN, obtaining the licensing rights for PBA, UFC, PSL, and the NFL, as well as access to ESPN programs and content. The partnership led to the formation of the ESPN5 brand, which aired on TV5 and AksyonTV. The move was part of TV5's temporary shift from a general entertainment station to a sports and news channel.

=== The 5 Network era and reverting to TV5 (2018–2020) ===
Logo used from February 17, 2018, to present with the current "5" wordmark used since April 4, 2010

On February 17, 2018, TV5 underwent a rebranding and was relaunched as the 5 Network or simply 5. The new logo dropped the word "TV" and was designed to be more flexible for use by the network's other divisions. The programming grid was divided into three blocks – ESPN5 for sports, News5 for news programs, and 'On 5' for other content. Additionally, D5 Studio focused on digital content, while Studio 5 produced Filipino productions for various platforms. The "Kapatid" ("sibling") moniker was de-emphasized during the period and was mainly used by News5 and ESPN5 for some programs. The network phased out Filipino-dubbed movies and foreign-acquired programming, which had been a practice since 2008, while Disney programs and movies aired in their original audio until 2019.

On January 13, 2019, TV5 introduced a variation of its 2018 logo, which included the respective websites of the division producing the program as part of their on-screen graphics following the launch of 5 Plus.

On April 22, 2019, TV5's legislative franchise was renewed for another 25 years under Republic Act No. 11320.

On June 3, 2019, Chot Reyes retired as TV5 President and CEO and was succeeded by Jane Basas, who led pay TV provider and radio company Cignal TV/Mediascape. Under Basas' leadership, the network outsourced news and sports programming from its co-owned Cignal channels, phased out daytime ESPN5 programs, focused on archived entertainment programs, and expanded movie blocks on 5 Plus. Plans for the network included retaining existing news programs and sports content in primetime and reintroducing original entertainment programming through outsourcing. Perci Interlan returned as the head of programming in November.

On February 4, 2020, Robert P. Galang was appointed as the new president and CEO of TV5 Network and Cignal TV, replacing Basas, who in turn was appointed as the Chief Marketing Officer of Smart Communications.

On March 8, 2020, 5 Plus was relaunched as One Sports, and the ESPN5 division was renamed and merged into the brand. The sports programming on 5 no longer carried the ESPN5 banner. The ESPN5 partnership continued online, with ESPN5.com serving as the sports portal of One Sports and ESPN in the Philippines until October 13, 2021. TV5 Network announced on the same day that 5 would be rebranded as One TV on April 13, 2020. However, due to the COVID-19 pandemic and disapproval from viewers and fans, the rebranding was postponed to July 20, until it was ultimately cancelled. The network returned to the TV5 brand on July 20, 2020, and introduced new Filipino-dubbed series.

On July 27, 2020, Cignal TV, TV5, and Smart Communications announced a multi-year deal with the National Basketball Association (NBA) for the league's official broadcast rights in the Philippines, replacing Solar Entertainment Corporation. The games during the 2019–2020 season were aired live on free-to-air networks TV5 and One Sports. This marked the return of the NBA to TV5 since the partnership between the then-ABC and Solar Entertainment Corporation from 2007 to 2008.

=== Second TV5 era and collaboration with Cignal TV (2020–present) ===
Logo used from January 13, 2019, to May 19, 2021, the second revision of the 2010 logo

The old headquarters of TV5 in Novaliches in 2022

Logo used from May 20, 2021, to April 27, 2026, the third revision of the 2010 logo

On August 15, 2020, Channel 5 reverted to its former name, TV5, and announced a partnership with its sister company Cignal TV, which was tasked with handling its programming. The partnership with Cignal TV introduced a slate of new entertainment programs and collaborations with other networks, including GMA Network, RPN, ZOE Broadcasting Network's A2Z and AMBS' All TV. TV5 unveiled its first wave of entertainment programs produced by companies such as Archangel Media/APT Entertainment, Content Cows Company Inc., Luminous Productions Inc., Regal Entertainment, Viva Television, and Brightlight Productions. Additionally, shows from ABS-CBN that were affected by the network's franchise non-renewal were transferred to TV5. In mid-September 2020, TV5 announced a second wave of programs for October, including shows produced by Regal, Viva, APT Entertainment, Brightlight Productions, and News5.

On January 24, 2021, TV5 has aired selected programming produced by ABS-CBN Studios following the shutdown of its free-to-air network. Programs included ASAP XP (2021–present, now hookup with All TV since 2026), Primetime Bida and Yes Weekend! (select programs only, 2021–present, now hookup with All TV since 2024), FPJ: Da King (2021–2023, now returned on GMA Network as FPJ sa GMA since 2025), It's Showtime (2022–2023, now moved on both All TV and GMA Network since 2024), Nag-aapoy Na Damdamin and Pira-Pirasong Paraiso (2023–2024 as part of Kapamilya Gold and reruns in 2026), Magandang Buhay (2023–2024, later moved on All TV from 2024 to 2026), Rated Korina (2023–present, originally by Brightlight Productions when the show transferred to TV5 from October 24, 2020, to June 16, 2023, now hookup with All TV since 2025), Sunday Blockbusters (2024), and Blockbusters sa Umaga (2026–present, hookup with A2Z and All TV). TV5 suspended the airing of newly released ABS-CBN content from January 2 to June 21, 2026, due to a financial dispute that was later settled.

TV5 introduced its revamped programming under the slogan "TV5 TodoMax," dividing programs into five blocks: TodoMax Kids, TodoMax Serbisyo (Idol in Action), TodoMax Panalo (the afternoon programming lineup), TodoMax Primetime (Singko), and TodoMax Weekend.

Following the programming revamp, TV5 became the second most-watched TV network in prime-time TV ratings, according to AGB Nielsen, which conducts audience measurements for television ratings in specific areas of the Philippines. Primetime programs produced by MQuest Ventures/Cignal/TV5 Entertainment, in association with various content company (such as UXS, The IdeaFirst Company, Viva Entertainment, ABS-CBN Studios, APT Entertainment, Brightlight Productions, Regal Entertainment, Cornerstone Studios and other various productions), contributed to the achievement.

On May 20, 2021, TV5 launched its new slogan "Iba sa 5" (which roughly translates to "It's different on 5") along with a new station jingle, station ID, and a revision of the 2010 logo with a darker red scheme. On July 1, 2022, the network introduced a new slogan, "Iba'ng Saya peg Sama-Sama" (The Fun is One of a Kind When We're Together), accompanied by another new station jingle and ID.

On January 31, 2023, Guido R. Zaballero was appointed as the president and CEO of TV5 Network, effective February 1, 2023. The appointment followed the retirement of Robert P. Galang, who had led Cignal TV and TV5 since February 2020. Jane J. Basas assumed the role of president and CEO of Cignal TV, while also serving as the president and CEO of MediaQuest, the holding company of TV5 and Cignal TV.

In November 2025, the National Telecommunications Commission (NTC) issued Memorandum Circular No. 005–11–2025, establishing a 12-month transition period for analog television stations operating in Mega Manila. The covered area includes the National Capital Region and parts of Bulacan, Rizal, Laguna, Cavite, Pampanga and Bataan. In July 2026, the NTC identified November 22, 2026, as the target date for the Mega Manila analog switch-off. The analog shutdown date was extended by the NTC on November 17, 2026, from the original November 22, 2026, it became January 15, 2027.

On April 27, 2026, TV5 updated its 2021 logo to a three-dimensional, metallic, beveled version as part of a "fresh start" for a new programming era.

On October 22, 2026, it further received a signal increase to 15 kW transmitter power. Few weeks later, the main Novaliches transmitter has increased its signal further to 20 kW.

==== Transition to high definition (2023) ====
On March 21, 2023, TV5 announced the launch of its main channel in high-definition (HD) feed, presented in a full-screen format, on Cignal TV. The channel officially launched as TV5 HD on April 1, 2023.

On April 16, 2023, TV5 began broadcasting in anamorphic 16:9 aspect ratio on free-to-air digital television.

== Digital television ==
=== Digital channels ===
DWET-TV's digital signal operates on UHF Channel 18 (497.143 MHz)^{1} and broadcasts on the following subchannels:

Channel	Video	Aspect	Short name	Programming	Notes
5.01	480i	16:9	TV5	TV5 (Main DWET-TV programming)	Commercial broadcast (20 kW)
5.02	480i	16:9	RPTV	RPTV (SD feed)	Commercial broadcast (20 kW)
5.03	480i	16:9	One Sports	One Sports	Commercial broadcast (20 kW)
5.35	240p	16:9	One Seg S1	TV5	1seg broadcast

Prior to the NTC's assignment of channels 14 to 20 for major broadcast networks, the station utilized UHF Channel 51 (695.143 MHz)^{2} for its digital TV operations, although it remains active to this day.

Channel	Video	Aspect	Short name	Programming	Notes
51.01	480i	16:9	One Sports	One Sports (Main DWNB-TV programming)	Commercial broadcast (5.5 kW)
51.02	480i	16:9	One PH	One PH	Commercial broadcast (5.5 kW)
51.03	480i	16:9	True TV	105.9 True FM	Commercial broadcast (5.5 kW)
51.35	240p	4:3	One Sports 1SEG	One Sports	1seg broadcast

=== Subchannel history ===
Since its addition to the subchannel lineup, One PH has been transmitted in widescreen on the channel 18 multiplex, while a 4:3 letterboxed feed is shown for the channel 51 multiplex; the latter would later mirror its widescreen feed with the former's multiplex sometime later. On April 16, 2023, output on DWET-TV began broadcasting its main channel in 16:9 widescreen output. The One Sports subchannel feeds, however, converted to widescreen broadcasting less than a year later, on January 22, 2024. Upon the launch of RPTV on February 1, 2024, it replaced the subchannel space of One PH, which reverted its availability to pay TV and streaming. However, One PH reverted to a digital free TV subchannel on channel 51 last August 29, 2026.

Notes

^{1} – Permanent digital frequency assigned by NTC (through a Memorandum Circular).
^{2} – Licensed to Mediascape (Cignal TV), Inc.

== Areas of coverage ==
=== Primary areas ===
- Metro Manila
- Cavite
- Bulacan
- Laguna
- Rizal

=== Secondary areas ===
- Pampanga
- Nueva Ecija
- Tarlac
- Portion of Pangasinan
- Portion of Bataan
- Portion of Batangas
- Portion of Quezon

== See also ==
- TV5
- RPTV
- One Sports
- One PH
- List of TV5 stations
- 105.9 True FM

Preceded by DZTM-TV (1962–1972)	DWET-TV; 1992–present	Incumbent
