= List of TV5 stations =

The following is a list of television and radio stations owned by and affiliated with the TV5 Network Inc. in the Philippines, including stations that airs TV5, One Sports and True FM.

== TV stations ==
=== Analog ===
Branding	Callsign	Channel	Type	Power	Location
TV5 Manila*	DWET	5	Originating	60 kW	TV5 Complex, 762 Quirino Highway, Brgy. San Bartolome, Novaliches, Quezon City
TV5 Laoag	DWTE	2	Relay	2.5 kW	Talingaan St., Brgy. 31, Laoag, Ilocos Norte
TV5 Baguio	DZET	28	Relay	10 kW	Mt. Sto. Tomas, Tuba, Benguet
TV5 Bacolod	DYTE	32	Relay	10 kW	PLDT Compound, Galo St., Bacolod
TV5 Cebu	DYET	21	Relay	10 kW	TV5 Transmitter Compound, Mount Busay, Brgy. Babag 2, Cebu City
TV5 Cagayan de Oro	DXTE	21	Relay	20 kW	Macapagal Drive, Upper Bulua, Cagayan de Oro
TV5 Davao	DXET	2	Relay	10 kW	TV5 Heights, Broadcast Ave. Shrine Hills, Matina, Davao City
TV5 General Santos	DXER	12	Relay	10 kW	PLDT Bldg, Beatiles St., General Santos
TV5 Butuan	PA	22	Relay	5 kW	PLDT Compound, JC Aquino Ave., Butuan

- Analog switch-off on January 15, 2026

==== Analog affiliates ====
Branding	Callsign	Channel	Power	Affiliation	Location
TV5 Tuguegarao	PA	39	5 kW	Interactive Broadcast Media, Inc.	Rios Building, Taft St. Cor. College Ave. Tuguegarao
TV5 Isabela	DWDH	25	5 kW	Cignal TV, Inc. (Mediascape, Inc.)	SMART Cellsite, Basilio St., Brgy. San Andres, Santiago, Isabela
TV5 Tarlac	PA	24	5 kW	Cignal TV, Inc. (Mediascape, Inc.)	MacArthur Highway, Brgy. Sto. Domingo II, Capas, Tarlac
TV5 Olongapo	PA	28	5 kW	Interactive Broadcast Media, Inc.	Alaska St., Upper Mabayuan, Olongapo
TV5 Batangas	PA	30	5 kW	Interactive Broadcast Media, Inc.	Mt. Banoy, Bo. Talumpok East, Batangas City
TV5 Occidental Mindoro	PA	34	5 kW	Cignal TV, Inc. (Mediascape, Inc.)	Brgy. 1 Poblacion, San Jose, Occidental Mindoro
TV5 Puerto Princesa	DWDD	29	5 kW	Nation Broadcasting Corporation	SMART Cellsite, Valencia St. Puerto Princesa, Palawan
TV5 Naga	DWNA	22	5 kW	Nation Broadcasting Corporation	SMART Cellsite, Maharlika Highway, Naga, Camarines Sur
TV5 Naga	DWLV	2	5 kW	Bicol Broadcasting System, Inc.	Sitio Upper Yabu, Brgy. Panicuason, Naga, Camarines Sur
TV5 Kalibo	PA	41	5 kW	Interactive Broadcast Media, Inc.	Garcia Building, C. Laserna St. Poblacion, Kalibo, Aklan
TV5 Iloilo	DYMB	36	10 kW	Cignal TV, Inc. (Mediascape, Inc.)	Piña-Tamborong-Alaguisoc Road, Jordan, Guimaras
TV5 Tacloban	PA	40	1 kW	Palawan Broadcasting Corporation/Prime Media Services	Residencia Marfel, #23 Lukban St., Tacloban
TV5 Zamboanga	DXGB	11	5 kW	Golden Broadcast Professional, Inc.	GBPI Bldg., Campaner Street, Zamboanga City

=== Digital ===
Branding	Callsign	Channel	Frequency	Type	Power	Location
TV5 Manila	DWET	18	497.143 MHz	Originating	20 kW	TV5 Complex, 762 Quirino Highway, Brgy. San Bartolome, Novaliches, Quezon City
TV5 Manila	PA	51	695.143 MHz	Originating	5.5 kW	NBC Transmitter Site, Block 3, Emerald Hills, Brgy. Sta. Cruz, Antipolo City, Rizal
TV5 Laoag	DWTE	18	497.143 MHz	Relay	5 kW	Talingaan St., Brgy. 31, Laoag City
TV5 Vigan	DWDI	18	497.143 MHz	Relay	5 kW	Rizal Avenue, Vigan City, Ilocos Sur
TV5 Tuguegarao	PA	18	497.143 MHz	Relay	5 kW	4th Floor, Rios Building, Taft St. Cor. College Ave. Tuguegarao
TV5 Isabela	DWDH	18	497.143 MHz	Relay	10 kW	SMART Cellsite, Basilio St., Brgy. San Andres, Santiago, Isabela
TV5 Baguio	DZET	51	695.143 MHz	Relay	10 kW	Mt. Sto. Tomas, Tuba, Benguet
TV5 Olongapo	PA	18	497.143 MHz	Relay	5 kW	Alaska St. Upper Mabayuan, Olongapo City
TV5 Tarlac	PA	18	497.143 MHz	Relay	5 kW	MacArthur Highway, Brgy. Sto. Domingo II, Capas, Tarlac
TV5 Batangas	PA	51	695.143 MHz	Relay	10 kW	Mt. Banoy, Bo. Talumpok East, Batangas City
TV5 Lucena	PA	18	497.143 MHz	Relay	5 kW	Brgy. Isabang, Tayabas, Quezon
TV5 Occidental Mindoro	PA	18	497.143 MHz	Relay	5 kW	Liboro St. Brgy. 1 Poblacion, San Jose, Occidental Mindoro
TV5 Puerto Princesa	DWDD	18	497.143 MHz	Relay	5 kW	SMART Cellsite, Valencia St. Puerto Princesa, Palawan
TV5 Legazpi	DWLB	18	497.143 MHz	Relay	5 kW	Mt. Bariw, Estanza, Legazpi City, Albay
TV5 Kalibo	PA	18	497.143 MHz	Relay	5 kW	Garcia Building, C. Laserna St. Poblacion, Kalibo, Aklan
TV5 Iloilo	DYMB	18	497.143 MHz	Relay	10 kW	TV5 Transmitter Tower, Piña-Tamborong-Alaguisoc Road, Jordan, Guimaras
TV5 Bacolod	DYTE	18	497.143 MHz	Relay	10 kW	PLDT Compound, Galo St., Bacolod
TV5 Cebu	DYET	18	497.143 MHz	Relay	10 kW	TV5 Transmitter Compound, Mount Busay, Brgy. Babag 2, Cebu City
TV5 Bohol	PA	18	497.143 MHz	Relay	5 kW	SMART Cellsite, Banat-i Hill, Tagbilaran
TV5 Zamboanga	PA	18	497.143 MHz	Relay	10 kW	PLDT Bldg., Canelar Moret, Zamboanga City
TV5 Cagayan de Oro	DXTE	18	497.143 MHz	Relay	10 kW	SMART Compound, Macapagal Drive, Upper Bulua, Cagayan de Oro
TV5 Iligan	PA	18	497.143 MHz	Relay	5 kW	PLDT Compound, Tibanga, Iligan
TV5 Davao	DXET	18	497.143 MHz	Relay	10 kW	TV5 Heights, Broadcast Ave., Shrine Hills, Matina, Davao City
TV5 General Santos	DXER	18	497.143 MHz	Relay	10 kW	PLDT Bldg, Beatiles St., General Santos
TV5 Butuan	PA	18	497.143 MHz	Relay	5 kW	PLDT Compound, JC Aquino Ave., Butuan

==== Digital affiliates ====
Branding	Callsign	Channel	Frequency	Company	Power	Location
TV5 Tacloban	DYPR	50	689.143 MHz	Philippine Collective Media Corporation	2 kW	Remedios Trinidad Romualdez Hospital Compound, Brgy. 96 (Calanipawan), Tacloban
TV5 Zamboanga	DXGB	51	695.143 MHz	Golden Broadcast Professional, Inc.	5 kW	GBPI Bldg., Campaner Street, Zamboanga City

TV5 main and subchannels
LCN	Video	Aspect	Name	Programming	Notes
xx.01	480i	16:9	TV5	TV5	Commercial broadcast
xx.03	480i	16:9	RPTV	RPTV	Commercial broadcast
xx.04	480i	16:9	One Sports	One Sports	Commercial broadcast
xx.35	240p	16:9	One Seg S1	TV5	1seg

== Radio stations ==
Branding	Callsign	Frequency	Power	Company	Location
True FM Manila (Note: Originating station.)	DWLA	105.9 MHz	20 kW	Bright Star Broadcasting Network	Mega Manila
True FM Davao	DXET	106.7 MHz	10 kW	Interactive Broadcast Media, Inc.	Davao City
True FM Cebu (Note: Semi-satellite station of DWLA 105.9 True FM Manila.)	DYFM	101.9 MHz	10 kW	Nation Broadcasting Corporation	Cebu City
True FM Cagayan de Oro (Note: Relay station of DWLA 105.9 True FM Manila.)	DXRL	101.5 MHz	10 kW	Nation Broadcasting Corporation	Cagayan de Oro
B 107.9 Kaboses Radio (Note: Affiliate station.)	—N/a	107.9 MHz	5 kW	Prime Media Services	Tacloban
Dream Radio	DYOC	99.9 MHz	5 kW	Prime Media Services	Ormoc

== See also ==
- Mediascape TV stations
- TV5 Network
- Nation Broadcasting Corporation
- List of Radio Philippines Network affiliate stations
