= Cignal TV =

Philippine media and telecommunications company

- TV5 Media Center at Reliance Street corner Sheridan Street, Mandaluyong City, where the Cignal TV corporate offices are located.
- Trade name: Mediascape Inc.
- Formerly: GV Broadcasting System (1983–2008)
- Type: Private (1983–2007); Subsidiary (since 2007)
- Industry: Mass media Telecommunications
- Founded: 1983; 43 years ago (broadcasts); February 1, 2009; 17 years ago (satellite broadcasts)
- Founder: Emmanuel "Manoling" A. Galang
- Headquarters: 5/F TV5 Media Center, Reliance cor. Sheridan Sts., Mandaluyong, Metro Manila, Philippines
- Area served: Philippines
- Key people: Manuel V. Pangilinan (Chairman); Victorico P. Vargas (President & CEO); Oscar Reyes, Jr. (COO); Sienna Olaso (Vice President; Head of Channels and Content); Vacant (Vice President; Head of Content Management and Acquisition); Rissa Guilas (AVP; Head of Channel Management and Programming); Engr. Erwin V. Galang (Head, Regulatory and Industry Relations); Engr. Edward Benedict V. Galang (Network Engineering Operations); Isabel Aranez-Santillan (Vice President; Head of Cignal Entertainment)
- Products: Cignal, Cignal Play, SatLite, Pay television networks
- Brands: Kapatid Channel; One News; One Sports+ One PH; True TV; PBA Rush; NBA TV Philippines; BuKo; UAAP Varsity Channel; TVUP; Red Fiber
- Services: Direct-broadcast satellite, IPTV, radio and pay television, pay per view, video on demand, film production, Fiber-optic broadband
- Owner: MediaQuest Holdings (PLDT BTF Holdings Inc.)
- Parent: Satventures, Inc.
- Divisions: Cignal Entertainment
- Subsidiaries: Apollo Broadcast Investors (50%; non-controlling stake)
- Website: cignal.tv

Cignal TV, Inc. (formerly known as GV Broadcasting System), also known by its legal trading name Mediascape Inc., is a Filipino media and telecommunications firm in the Philippines. A wholly owned subsidiary of the media company MediaQuest Holdings under the PLDT Beneficial Trust Fund, the firm operates its pay television services (Cignal and SatLite), subscription television networks (One News, One Sports+, BuKo, NBA TV Philippines, PBA Rush, and UAAP Varsity Channel), television and film entertainment production (Cignal Entertainment), and fiber broadband internet (Red Fiber).

Cignal TV also operates in sixteen affiliate free television stations TV5 (with its main frequencies owned by its sister company) and one affiliate free television station One Sports (with its owned by Nation Broadcasting Corporation). In addition, under the Mediascape name, it operates UHF 51 via DTT in Metro Manila and a majority of thirteen regional DTV stations affiliated with TV5 Network, and owns provincial radio stations associated with Apollo Broadcast Investors/GV Radios Network Corporation.

== History ==
=== Early years ===
The firm was founded in 1983 as GV Broadcasting System by the Galang family. GV then operated its radio stations in Pampanga and later expanded in Batangas. GV's broadcast franchise was granted in 1995, and was later amended in 1998 allowing the inclusion of establishing its pay-TV business.

In 2007, MediaQuest Holdings acquired a majority stake in GV and its parent Satventures, making the Galangs being part of MediaQuest. The Galangs would spun-off its broadcast radio assets. Smart Communications executive Orlando Vea was then appointed as the new executive of GV.

At that time, it formed a partnership with PLDT subsidiary Smart Communications to launch a mobile TV service called myTV. The trial service was later stopped in 2010.

=== Expansion and the birth of Cignal TV ===
In 2008, after its stake in the Sky Cable business was sold to the Lopez Group of Companies, PLDT announced its intention of entering the direct-to-home satellite service industry using the franchise of GV (which in turn, was renamed to Mediascape, Inc.), with the result forming a new DTH satellite brand called Cignal which was launched a year later in 2009.

In 2012, Cignal TV launched its first satellite television networks: lifestyle channel Colours (now defunct), sports channel Hyper (now One Sports+), and Weather Information Network (now defunct). The channels were launched on April 14, 2012.

On March 25, 2015, TV5 Network and Cignal TV announced its partnership with Bloomberg L.P. to establish a local Bloomberg service in the Philippines. It will provide up-to-date business information to aid in their decision-making in an aim to place the country as the "next financial capital of Southeast Asia." The service was formally unveiled on August 13, and it started airing on October 5, 2015.

On August 3, 2015, TV5 Network through its sister company Cignal, ties up with Viva Communications to form an entertainment network the Sari-Sari Channel that will air programs and movies from both the Viva portfolio and TV5. SSN will also handle the production of all the entertainment programs of TV5. Instead of this, the network has appointed Viva head honcho Vic del Rosario, Jr. as its chief entertainment strategist in October 2015.

In 2016, Cignal made a partnership with the Philippine Basketball Association (PBA) to launch PBA Rush, a 24-hour channel featuring content from the PBA as well as live games.

In 2017, Cignal began its new venture outside of the DTH service with the launch of its own entertainment unit Cignal Entertainment.

In 2018, Cignal TV formally launched One News, an English-language news and public affairs channel which features content from the news divisions of the MediaQuest group (News5, The Philippine Star and BusinessWorld).

In 2019, Cignal launched two new channels under the "One" brand, namely: One Sports, a sports channel replacing Hyper; and One PH, an all-Filipino language news and public affairs channel featuring a mix of content from Radyo5 and its own produced programming. In November 2019, Cignal TV made a 5-year content partnership with APT Entertainment for BuKo Channel (Buhay Komedya), the first all-local comedy channel to be launched supposedly in the 2nd quarter of 2020, but was delayed due to the COVID-19 pandemic in the Philippines until the channel would be pushed through on August 2, 2021.

On July 27, 2020, Cignal TV announced the multi-year partnership deal with the NBA, on the announcement it was also mentioned that the provider will launch an NBA-dedicated pay TV channel, NBA TV Philippines along with the airing of games through its free-to-air channels (TV5 and One Sports).

On August 15, 2020, following the resignation of Chot Reyes as TV5 Network president and CEO in June 2019 and the denial of ABS-CBN's franchise by 70 congressmen in July 2020, sister company, TV5 Network announced its partnership with Cignal TV to become as TV5's main content provider to handle the network's blocktime entertainment programming in order to bring back the glory days of TV5 to compete again with GMA Network, TV5's longtime rival and other TV networks in the Philippines, blocktiming with other production companies such as Regal Entertainment, Viva Television, Brightlight Productions and APT Entertainment to air new programs, mostly featuring stars and retrenched creatives from ABS-CBN as well as few stars from GMA.

In October 2020, Cignal TV formally signed a broadcast agreement with the University Athletic Association of the Philippines (UAAP) for the coverage rights of every UAAP varsity sporting events through 2026 on TV5 and One Sports in addition of the upcoming dedicated channel on the Cignal service.

On November 16, 2020, Cignal TV began venturing into the fiber broadband business with the launch of Red Broadband. It is a partnership with Meralco's telco unit Radius Telecoms.

On March 29, 2022, President Rodrigo Duterte signed Republic Act No. 11668 which renewed Cignal TV's legislative franchise for another 25 years. The law granted Cignal TV a franchise to construct, install, operate, and maintain, for commercial purposes, radio broadcasting stations and television stations, including digital television system, with the corresponding facilities such as relay stations, throughout the Philippines.

On August 10, 2022, it was announced that Cignal Cable Corporation (formerly Dakila Cable TV Corporation), Cignal TV's affiliate and corporate partner, would acquire a 38.88% minority stake of ABS-CBN Corporation's cable TV arm, Sky Cable Corporation. Also announced was the investment of ABS-CBN into Cignal's sister company TV5 Network through a "debt instruments agreement". The proposed investment by Cignal Cable will have an option to acquire an additional 61.12% of Sky Cable shares within the next eight years. On September 1, 2022, both parties announced the termination of the proposed investment due to alleged political pressure.

On January 31, 2023, Guido R. Zaballero as president and chief executive officer of TV5 Network, effective February 1, 2023. He will assume the position following the retirement of Robert P. Galang, who headed Cignal TV and TV5 since 2020. Meanwhile, Jane J. Basas has assumed the post of president and CEO of Cignal TV, concurrently with her role as the president and CEO of MediaQuest, the holding company of TV5 and Cignal TV.

On January 9, 2026, Basas resigned as president and CEO of MediaQuest, with Ricky Vargas assuming the transitional role of officer-in-charge.

== Assets ==
=== Pay television ===
==== Cignal ====
Cignal is the company's flagship brand operates as a direct-to-home satellite service.

==== SatLite ====
SatLite
- Logo used since 2018
- Type: Direct-broadcast satellite television
- Country: Philippines
- Availability: Nationwide
- Parent: Cignal TV, Inc.
- Launch date: January 12, 2018; 8 years ago
- Picture format: DVB-S2 MPEG-4
- Official website: www.satlitetv.com

SatLite is a digital prepaid pay TV service launched on January 12, 2018. It offers budget-sized lineup of channels with a similarity of Cignal's channel lineup, and is only catered to low income households and rural communities. SatLite uses Koreasat 7, the satellite transponder previously used by the now-defunct Dream Satellite TV prior to the end of 2017.

=== Television channels ===
Following the launch of its satellite TV service in 2009, Cignal TV has been establishing its own cable television channels.

==== Kapatid Channel ====
Kapatid Channel is a Philippine cable television channel owned by TV5 Network Inc. and MQuest Ventures, The channel airs simulcast and re-running programs from its main channel TV5 and its sister cable channels BuKo and Sari-Sari Channel (now defunct) and it also airs some movies from MQuest Ventures (under its predecessors, Studio5 and Cignal Entertainment).

==== One PH ====
One PH is a 24/7 Filipino-language news/talk and public affairs channel. The channel predominantly airs simulcasts of Radyo5 (now True FM) programs. This channel replaced AksyonTV's "teleradyo" segment when it rebranded as 5 Plus on January 13, 2019. One PH started its official broadcasting on February 18, 2019.

==== One News ====
One News is a 24-hour English-language news and public affairs channel in partnership with MVP-owned media properties News5, The Philippine Star, BusinessWorld, Bloomberg TV Philippines and content provider Probe Productions. It was launched on May 28, 2018.

==== One Sports+ ====
One Sports+ is a sports and entertainment cable/satellite television channel. It was launched on January 9, 2019. This counterpart of One Sports channel was renamed to One Sports+, as terrestrial television channel of One Sports was launched on March 8, 2020, replacing 5 Plus.

==== True TV ====
True TV is a pay-television channel of Cignal. It serves as a television feed of 105.9 True FM Manila.

==== PBA Rush ====
PBA Rush is a 24/7 channel which has been currently airing games of the Philippine Basketball Association. The channel is patterned after NBA TV and it airs live telecast of the PBA games (in English commentary), same day replays of PBA games, games from the PBA D-League, PBA Women's 3x3 and Batang PBA, Sports 360 and behind-the-scenes shows such as Kuwentong Gilas.

==== NBA TV Philippines ====
NBA TV Philippines is a 24/7 channel which has been currently airing games of the National Basketball Association. The channel is the Philippine counterpart of the league-dedicated channel in United States NBA TV and it airs live telecast of the NBA games.

==== UAAP Varsity Channel ====
The UAAP Varsity Channel is a collegiate sports channel in partnership with the UAAP. It airs various collegiate sporting events of the UAAP all-year round, with most of the events primarily on basketball, cheerdance competition, volleyball and football.

=== Radio ===
Apollo Broadcast Investors operates/represents the radio assets of GV/Mediascape (thru GV Radios Network Corporation), which its pay-TV congressional franchise is used to operate Cignal and SatLite. GV 99.1, Mediascape's flagship FM station based in Pampanga (operated by GV Radios), is also heard nationwide via Cignal Channel 306.

While it is owned by the same company (MediaQuest Holdings), Apollo Broadcast Investors/GV Radios is not associated with its sister company Nation Broadcasting Corporation, which also operates television and radio stations that are affiliated with TV5 Network.

=== Cignal Play ===
Cignal Play is the digital Internet Protocol television (IPTV) and video on demand (VOD) service of Cignal. Exclusively for Cignal and PLDT subscribers, it allows the user to watch live linear channels offered from Cignal as well as content from third-party providers.

In August 2019, it was announced that Cignal will invest P200 million for content production, and is planning to relaunch Cignal Play in October 2019 as a standalone over-the-top (OTT) service with its own original content and shows from third-party productions such as HBO and AXN.

Cignal Play is open to Basic subscribers for free that includes live channels TV5, One Sports, Cignal-exclusive channels (One News, One PH, One Sports+, One Screen and Colours) and other exclusive or free-to-air channels and catch-up episodes from TV5 and Brightlight Productions, and costs P75 per month for Premium subscribers that can access up to 28 channels and access to premium movies and series.

In 2025, Cignal Play began streaming its own original short-form microdramas.

==== Pilipinas Live ====
Pilipinas Live is a hub under Cignal Play dedicated for sports programming. It originally launched as a subscription-based over-the-top streaming platform in 2023 before being integrated into Cignal Play in August 2026. It uses the Quickplay platform.

=== Red Fiber ===
Red Fiber is the broadband internet service of Cignal TV. It offers ultra high-speed internet with a download speed of up to 400 Mbit/s bundled with Cignal channels and Cignal Play to selected residential areas in Metro Manila using the fiber-optic cable service of Meralco's Radius Telecoms. It is commercially launched on November 16, 2020.

== Cignal Entertainment ==
Cignal Entertainment TV5 Entertainment
- Formerly: MPB Primedia, Inc. (2008-2010); TV5 Entertainment Group (2010-2017)
- Type: Division
- Industry: Television; Film; Broadcast syndication; Distribution
- Predecessors: ABC/TV5 Entertainment Department
- Founded: 2017; 9 years ago
- Defunct: January 31, 2024; 2 years ago
- Fate: Assets were later TV5 and Cignal TV jointly with MQuest Ventures
- Headquarters: TV5 Media Center, Reliance cor. Sheridan Sts.,, Mandaluyong, Metro Manila, Philippines
- Area served: Worldwide
- Key people: Manuel V. Pangilinan (Chairman); Victorico P. Vargas (President & CEO); Sienna Olaso (Vice President; Head of Channels and Content); Isabel Aranez-Santillan (Vice President; Head of Cignal Entertainment)
- Products: Television programs; Motion pictures; Live events; Concert tours
- Services: Television production; Film production; Film promotion; Concert production
- Parent: TV5 Network, Inc.
- Divisions: Sari-Sari Network; UXS, Inc.; Epik Studios

Cignal Entertainment (formerly ABC Entertainment Department and TV5 Entertainment Group) is a Philippine television, film, event production and distribution company and the entertainment division of TV5 Network, Inc. and jointly operated with sister company Cignal TV. It was launched in 2017 with the mini-drama Tukhang, followed by several series and movies they produced such as Ang Babaeng Allergic sa WiFi (2018, for Pista ng Pelikulang Pilipino, co-produced with The IdeaFirst Company and October Train Films), Born Beautiful (2019, co-produced with The IdeaFirst Company and October Train Films), Malecdito (2019, co-produced with Fox Networks Group Philippines), Feelenial (2019, co-produced with DSL Events and Production House, Inc.) and Cara x Jagger (2019, co-produced with APT Entertainment).

Since August 2020, Cignal Entertainment serves as the primary production and content provider unit of Cignal TV for TV5's blocktime airings. It handles entertainment and lifestyle programs co-produced with various local and foreign production houses such as MQ Studios, Archangel Media, Inc., TVJ Productions, Regal Entertainment, Brightlight Productions, Studio Viva (formerly known as Viva Television), ABS-CBN Studios, Double Vision Malaysia, Astro Shaw Malaysia and Mediacorp Singapore.

List of current television productions

| Title | Broadcast date | Co-production with | Network |
|---|---|---|---|
| Face 2 Face (2nd Incarnation) | May 1, 2023 – present | | TV5; One PH |

Formerly aired programs

| Title | Broadcast date | Co-production with | Network |
|---|---|---|---|
| Tukhang | 2017 | | Colours; Sari-Sari Channel |
| Bawal Na Game Show | August 15, 2020 – March 31, 2021 | Archangel Media, Inc. | TV5 |
| Fill in the Bank | August 15, 2020 – March 30, 2021 | Archangel Media, Inc. | TV5 |
| Bangon Talentadong Pinoy | August 15, 2020 – March 13, 2021 | The IdeaFirst Company | TV5 |
| Usapang Real Life | August 15, 2020 – January 9, 2021 | ContentCows Company, Inc. | TV5; Colours |
| Fit for Life | August 16 – November 1, 2020 | Luminus Productions, Inc. | TV5; Colours |
| Chika, Besh! | August 17, 2020 – January 8, 2021 | Archangel Media, Inc. | TV5; Colours |
| Masked Singer Pilipinas | Season 1 October 24 – December 26, 2020; Season 2 March 19 – July 9, 2022; Season 3 May 17 – August 17, 2025 | Viva Television | TV5; Sari-Sari Channel |
| Paano ang Pangako? | November 23, 2020 – March 31, 2021 | The IdeaFirst Company | TV5; One Screen |
| Ate ng Ate Ko | November 23, 2020 – February 15, 2021 | Archangel Media, Inc. | TV5; One Screen |
| Stay-In Love | November 24, 2020 – February 16, 2021 | Cornerstone (CS) Studios | TV5; One Screen |
| Carpool | November 26, 2020 – February 18, 2021 | Archangel Media, Inc. | TV5; One Screen |
| John En Ellen | January 24 – August 1, 2021 | Debonair Productions; Ichthus Productions | TV5; One Screen |
| Gen Z | February 7 – May 30, 2021 | Regal Entertainment | TV5; One Screen |
| The Wall Philippines | March 13, 2021 – December 4, 2022 | Viva Television; GMA Entertainment Group (season 2) | TV5; Sari-Sari Channel; GMA Network |
| 1000 Heartbeats: Pintig Pinoy | March 20 – June 12, 2021 | Viva Television | TV5; Sari-Sari Channel |
| Encounter | March 20 – October 30, 2021 | Viva Television | TV5; Sari-Sari Channel |
| Niña Niño | April 5, 2021 – May 19, 2022 | Cornerstone (CS) Studios | TV5; Colours |
| Rolling In It Philippines | Season 1 June 5 – October 2, 2021; Season 2 May 28 – September 24, 2022 | Viva Television | TV5; Sari-Sari Channel |
| POPinoy | June 13 – November 7, 2021 | Archangel Media, Inc. | TV5; Colours |
| Puto | June 19 – September 11, 2021 | Viva Television | TV5; Sari-Sari Channel |
| Di Na Muli | September 18 – December 18, 2021 | Viva Television | TV5; Sari-Sari Channel |
| Lakwatsika | April 18, 2022 – July 15, 2022 | Redcrane Studios | TV5 |
| Top Class | June 18, 2022 – August 20, 2022 | Cornerstone (CS) Studios; Kumu | TV5; Kumu |
| Suntok sa Buwan | July 18 – December 8, 2022 | Cornerstone (CS) Studios | TV5 |
| Oh My Korona | August 6 – November 26, 2022 | Cornerstone (CS) Studios | TV5 |
| Sing Galing! (second incarnation) | Season 1 April 5, 2021 – March 12, 2022; Season 2 March 21 – December 22, 2022 | Cornerstone (CS) Studios | TV5; Colours |
| Sing Galing Kids | July 16 – December 3, 2022 | Cornerstone (CS) Studios | TV5 |
| Kalye Kweens | October 1 – December 24, 2022 | Viva Television | TV5; Sari-Sari Channel |
| Kurdapya | March 18 – June 17, 2023 | Studio Viva | TV5; Sari-Sari Channel |
| Team A: Happy Fam, Happy Life | Season 1 March 18 – June 17, 2023 | Studio Viva | TV5; Sari-Sari Channel |
| Emojination | May 14, 2023 – May 11, 2024 | APT Entertainment | TV5; BuKo |
| Jack and Jill sa Diamond Hills | May 14, 2023 – May 5, 2024 | Archangel Media, Inc. | TV5; BuKo |
| Team A | Season 2 July 15 – October 7, 2023 | Studio Viva | TV5; Sari-Sari Channel |
| Minsan pa Nating Hagkan ang Nakaraan | July 25 – October 20, 2023 | Studio Viva | TV5; Sari-Sari Channel |
| Wow Mali: Doble Tama! | August 26, 2023 – October 26, 2024 | APT Entertainment | TV5; BuKo |
| Spingo | September 11 – December 8, 2023 | The IdeaFirst Company; O4 Media | TV5 |
| Padyak Princess | June 10, 2024 – September 27, 2024 | APT Entertainment | TV5 |
| Wil to Win | July 14, 2024 – April 25, 2025 | WinQuest Productions | TV5 |

List of featured films produced and/or distributed by Cignal Entertainment

| Title | Release date | Co-production with | Accolades |
|---|---|---|---|
| Ang Babaeng Allergic sa WiFi | August 15, 2018 | OctoberTrain Films | |
| Born Beautiful | January 18, 2019 | The IdeaFirst Company | |
| Maledicto | May 1, 2019 | Fox Networks Group Philippines | |
| Feelenial | June 19, 2019 | DSL Events and Production House, Inc. | |
| Babae at Baril | October 15, 2019 | Epicmedia | |
| Cara x Jagger | November 6, 2019 | APT Entertainment | |
| Kalel, 15 | November 29, 2019 | The IdeaFirst Company | |
| The Fabulous Filipino Brothers | October 18, 2021 | Self-produced | |
| Big Night! | December 25, 2021 | The IdeaFirst Company; Octobertrain Films; Quantum Films | 2021 Metro Manila Film Festival: Best picture; Best director, Best screenplay (Jun Lana); Best actor (Christian Bables); Best supporting actor (John Arcilla) |

== Former assets ==
=== Weather Information Network ===
Weather Information Network is the first weather-oriented television channel in the Philippines. It is created in May 2012 as Cignal TV forms a partnership with New Zealand-based Metra Weather. the channel brings projected storm tracks, wind direction, rain volume, water conditions, regional and provincial weather, and seven-day forecasts as well as other information related to weather. The channel ceased airing on December 23, 2013, as TV5 transfers its broadcast facilities from its TV5 Studio Complex in Novaliches, Quezon City to TV5 Media Center in Reliance, Mandaluyong.

=== Bloomberg TV Philippines ===
Bloomberg TV Philippines was a Philippine business news channel formed through a partnership of Cignal TV, TV5 Network and Bloomberg L.P. Launched on October 5, 2015, it includes a variety of locally produced business and complementary programs powered by News5 and foreign news from the main Bloomberg Television. The channel was shut down on May 27, 2018 and it was replaced by One News. Although, Bloomberg-produced programs is still carried by One News under the block of the same name of the now defunct channel.

=== One Screen ===
One Screen was an entertainment cable/satellite television channel. It was launched on June 15, 2020. It aired movies from local productions and foreign content from CinemaWorld, as well as reruns from TV5 and third-party productions. The channel of ceased its broadcast on January 1, 2022. and it was replaced by RPTV.

=== Hyper ===
Hyper was a sports and entertainment cable/satellite television channel and one of the first two channels launched by Cignal TV. Launched on April 14, 2012, its programming composed of local and foreign produced sports programs and events, some of them came from now-defunct primetime block AKTV, as well as Jai-Alai and horse racing events. The channel was shut down on January 9, 2019 and it was replaced by One Sports.

=== Colours ===
Colours was a magazine cable/satellite television channel. Launched on May 5, 2012, its programming composed primarily of lifestyle and reality shows. The channel ceased its broadcast on January 1, 2022.

==== Media Pilipinas TV ====
Media Pilipinas TV was a is a top-tier sports channel launched by April 13, 2023. The related sports shows into MPBL and the Blow by Blow. The channel ceased its broadcast on April 12, 2025.

==== WilTV ====
WilTV was a all-game and entertainment channel which is a joint venture of Willie Revillame, MQuest Ventures and Cignal TV and it was launched on January 25, 2026. The test run also marked the network’s buildup toward the debut of Revillame’s new game show Wilyonaryo and his public service program Willingly Yours, The channel ceased its broadcast on May 22, 2026 due to difficulties attracting advertisers (mainly because of the online gaming/raffle format).

==== Sari-Sari Channel ====
Sari-Sari Channel (visually rendered in all capital letters as SARI SARI CHANNEL) was a 24-hour general entertainment channel under a joint venture between Cignal TV and Viva Communications was launched on January 15, 2016. Named after the Philippine sari-sari store, it offers a smorgasbord of shows from the portfolios of Studio Viva and TV5. The channel ceased its broadcast on June 1, 2026.

== Mediascape TV stations ==
Since 2010, Cignal TV/Mediascape's regional television stations are the primary affiliate group of TV5, RPTV and One Sports.

=== Active ===
| Branding | Callsign | Ch. # | Power kW (ERP) | Type | Affiliation | Location (Transmitter Site) |
|---|---|---|---|---|---|---|
| MediaScape TV-51 Manila | (Provisional authority) | TV-51 | 5 kW | DTT | One Sports/One PH/True TV (digital TV test broadcast) | Block 3, Emerald Hills, Brgy. Sta. Cruz, Antipolo City, Rizal under Mandaluyong City Mega Manila |
| MediaScape TV-39 Tuguegarao | DWZE-TV | TV-39 (Analog); TV-18 (DTT) | 5 kW | Analog/DTT | TV5 | Rios Building, Taft St. Cor. College Ave. Tuguegarao City (Cagayan Valley) |
| MediaScape TV-25 Santiago | DWDH | TV-25 (Analog); TV-18 (DTT) | 10 kW | Analog/DTT | TV5/RPTV/One Sports (digital TV test broadcast) | Basilio St., Brgy. San Andres, Santiago, Isabela (Cagayan Valley) |
| MediaScape TV-18 Ilocos Sur | DWDI-DTV | TV-18 | 5 kW | DTT | TV5/RPTV/One Sports (digital TV test broadcast) | Rizal Avenue, Vigan City, Ilocos Sur (Ilocos Region) |
| MediaScape TV-28 Olongapo | (Provisional authority) | TV-28 (Analog); TV-18 (DTT) | 5 kW | Analog/DTT | TV5 | Alaska St. Upper Mabayuan, Olongapo City (Central Luzon) |
| MediaScape TV-24 Tarlac | DZJA-TV | TV-24 (Analog); TV-18 (DTT) | 1 kW (Analog); 5 kW (DTT) | Analog/DTT | TV5 | MacArthur Highway, Brgy. Sto. Domingo II, Capas, Tarlac |
| MediaScape TV-44 Batangas | DWBD-TV | TV-44 (Analog); TV-51 (DTT) | 10 kW | Analog/DTT | RPTV | Pres. Jose P. Laurel Highway, Mahabang Parang, Batangas City (Calabarzon) |
| MediaScape TV-34 Occidental Mindoro | (Provisional authority) | TV-34 (Analog); TV-18 (DTT) | 5 kW | Analog/DTT | TV5 | Liboro St. Brgy. 1 Poblacion, San Jose, Occidental Mindoro |
| MediaScape TV-18 Legazpi | DWLB-DTV | TV-18 | 5 kW | DTT | TV5/RPTV/One Sports (digital TV test broadcast) | Mt. Bariw, Estanza, Legazpi City, Albay (Bicol Region) |
| MediaScape TV-41 Kalibo | DYCJ-TV | TV-41 (Analog); TV-18 (DTT) | 5 kW | Analog/DTT | TV5 | Garcia Building, C. Laserna St. Poblacion, Kalibo, Aklan (Western Visayas) |
| MediaScape TV-33 Roxas | DYMD-TV | TV-33 (Analog); TV-18 (DTT) | 10 kW | Analog/DTT | TV5 | Iloilo-Capiz National Highway, Brgy, Cabugao, Roxas, Capiz. |
| MediaScape TV-36 Iloilo | DYMB-TV | TV-36 (Analog); TV-18 (DTT) | 10 kW (138.7 kW ERP) | Analog/DTT | TV5 | Piña-Tamborong-Alaguisoc Road, Jordan, Guimaras. (Western Visayas) |
| MediaScape TV-36 Iligan | (Provisional authority) | TV-36 (Analog); TV-18 (DTT) | 5 kW | Analog/DTT | TV5 | Andres Bonifacio Ave., Brgy. San Miguel, Iligan City (Northern Mindanao) |
| MediaScape TV-18 Butuan | (Provisional authority) | TV-22 (Analog); TV-18 (DTT) | 5 kW | Analog/DTT | TV5/RPTV/One Sports (digital TV test broadcast) | JC Aquino Ave., Butuan (Caraga) |

=== Inactive/Former analog ===
| Callsign | Ch. # | Power kW (ERP) | Location (Transmitter Site) |
|---|---|---|---|
| DWDJ-TV^{2} | TV-40 | 10 kW | Dagupan |
| (Provisional authority)^{2} | TV-43 | 10 kW | Laoag, Ilocos Norte |
| DWDI-TV^{1} | TV-32 | 5 kW | Vigan, Ilocos Sur |
| DWTU-TV^{2} | TV-40 | 5 kW | Naga City |
| DWLB-TV^{1} | TV-45 | 10 kW (138.78 kW ERP) | Legazpi, Albay |
| (Provisional authority)^{2} | TV-25 | 10 kW (138.78 kW ERP) | Puerto Princesa |
| (Provisional authority)^{2} | TV-41 | 5 kW | Santa Cruz, Marinduque |
| DWMD-TV^{2} | TV-50 | 5 kW | Calapan |
| DWSS-TV^{3} | TV-47 | 5 kW | Sorsogon City |
| DXMZ-TV^{3} | TV-33 | 10 kW | Zamboanga City |
| (Provisional authority)^{2} | TV-37 | 10 kW | Cagayan de Oro |
| (Provisional authority)^{3} | TV-34 | 10 kW | Malaybalay, Bukidnon |
| DXOC-TV^{3} | TV-48 | 10 kW | Oroquieta |

^{1} Fully migrated from analog to digital
^{2} Still inactive
^{3} Available soon on analog and digital
