= DXFM =

Radio station in Davao City, Philippines

FMR Davao (DXFM)
Simulcast of FMR DavNor
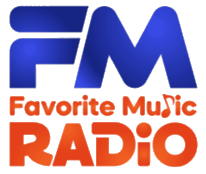
- Davao City; Philippines
- Broadcast area: Metro Davao and surrounding areas
- Frequency: 101.9 MHz
- RDS: FMR101.9
- Branding: 101.9 FMR

Programming
- Languages: Cebuano, Filipino
- Format: Contemporary MOR, OPM
- Network: FMR Philippines
- Affiliations: DZMM Radyo Patrol 630/DZMM TeleRadyo; ABS-CBN News (for TV Patrol newscast); PRTV Prime Media (for Arangkada Balita newscast); TV5 News (for Ted Failon at DJ Chacha sa True FM)

Ownership
- Owner: Nation Broadcasting Corporation
- Operator: Philippine Collective Media Corporation (outright acquisition of the frequency pending)
- Sister stations: Through NBC: DXAN-TV (RPTV; operated by TV5); Through PCMC: PRTV Prime Media (DXKC-DTV)

History
- First air date: 1975
- Former names: MRS 101.9 (1975–1998); Danni @ Rhythms 101.9 (1998–2005); Danni 101.9 (2005–2009); Wav FM (2009–2011); Radyo5 True FM (2011–2024); FM Radio 92.3 relay (November 2024–December 2024)
- Call sign meaning: Frequency Modulation

Technical information
- Licensing authority: NTC
- Power: 10,000 watts
- ERP: 32,000 watts

Links
- Webcast: Listen Live

DXFM (101.9 FM), on-air as FMR 101.9 is a radio station owned by the Nation Broadcasting Corporation and operated by Philippine Collective Media Corporation. It currently serves as a relay station of 89.5 FMR DavNor, which has studios at the 2nd Floor, JRafols Building, Purok 3, La Filipina, Tagum. The station's relay transmitter is located at Shrine Hills, Matina, Davao City.

== History ==
The station was established in 1975 as MRS 101.9 Most Requested Song. It carried an adult contemporary format.

On September 1, 1998, after NBC was acquired by PLDT Beneficial Trust Fund's broadcasting division MediaQuest Holdings from the consortium of the Yabut family and then House Speaker Manny Villar, the station rebranded as Danni @ Rhythms 101.9 and switched to an urban contemporary format. On August 1, 2005, the "Rhythms" tag was dropped.

On October 1, 2009, Audiowav Media (WAV Atmospheric) took over the station's operations, along with NBC's stations in Visayas and Mindanao, and relaunched it as WAV FM. It carried a Top 40 format with the slogan "Philippines' Hit Music Station".

On December 1, 2011, TV5 took over the station's operations and relaunched it under the Radyo5 network as Radyo5 101.9 News FM. Initially a relay of Manila-based 92.3 News FM, the station launched its local programming on December 3, 2012.

On October 5, 2020, Davao-based local media company KAMM Media Network took over the station's weekday morning slot under a blocktime agreement. It was thus the only Radyo5 station that did not simulcast Ted Failon at DJ Chacha sa Radyo5 (now known as Ted Failon at DJ Chacha sa True FM).

On March 11, 2024, Radyo5 changed its sub-brand to True FM (adopted from its flagship station in Manila) and adopted the slogan "Diri Kita sa Tinuod!".

On November 1, 2024, it began simulcasting on 106.7 FM, owned by Interactive Broadcast Media, as part of the integration into the newly established True Network. True FM Davao then fully transferred its operations to 106.7 FM on November 4, aligning with its Mega Manila counterpart's reassignment. It was replaced by a relay of FM Radio 92.3 Manila, the former flagship True FM station now under Philippine Collective Media Corporation (PCMC). This change was part of an agreement wherein PCMC will acquire most of NBC's radio assets and frequencies, except for its stations in Cebu and Cagayan de Oro.

On December 8, 2024, it became a relay of 89.5 FM Radio, which is based in Tagum, and held its Paskong Ka-Vibes launch concert at Ayala Malls Abreeza. On February 10, 2025, FM Radio launched a new roster of DJs and new schedule, following its transfer to JRafols Building in La Filipina.
