= DXYZ =

DXYZ may refer to the following radio stations in Mindanao, Philippines:

- DXYZ-AM (963 AM), an AM radio station broadcasting in Zamboanga City, branded as Sonshine Radio
- DXYZ-FM (107.1 FM), an FM radio station broadcasting in Iligan, branded as Love Radio
