= DZRB =

DZRB may refer to:

- DZRB-AM, an AM radio station broadcasting in Metro Manila, branded as Radyo Pilipinas - Radyo Publiko
- DZRB-FM, a defunct FM radio station in Naga, Camarines Sur
- DZRB-TV, a TV station broadcasting in Laoag
