= TV4ME Philippines =

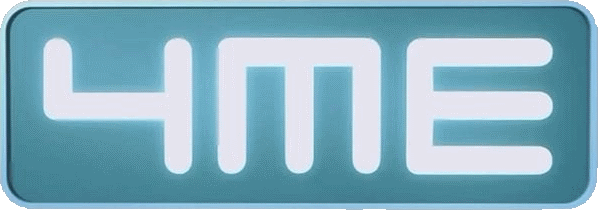
- Country: Philippines
- Headquarters: TV5 Media Center, Reliance cor. Sheridan sts., Mandaluyong, Metro Manila, Philippines

Programming
- Languages: English, Filipino

Ownership
- Owner: TV5 Network Inc. Brand New Media

History
- Launched: February 2015

Links
- Website: tv4me.com.ph

TV4ME Philippines was a lifestyle multi-channel network (MCN) in the Philippines. It consisted of 10 original channels with original, short-form content around food, health, travel, fashion, celebrity, and home style. It also provided programs from the Outdoor Channel and History Channel.

TV4ME was owned by Brand New Media Philippines, which itself was a joint venture between Brand New Media and MediaQuest Holdings. TV5 and Brand New Media signed the joint venture in October 2014. This service is currently inactive due to budget cuts by TV5.

== Website ==
- Official Website
