= 5 Plus =

Defunct television network in the Philippines

- Type: Free-to-air television network
- Country: Philippines
- Founded: January 13, 2019; 7 years ago
- TV stations: List of 5 Plus stations
- Headquarters: TV5 Media Center, Reliance cor. Sheridan Sts., Mandaluyong
- Area: Nationwide
- Owner: PLDT Beneficial Trust Fund (MediaQuest Holdings)
- Parent: Nation Broadcasting Corporation (broadcast spectrum/license); TV5 Network, Inc. (programming and broadcast facilities); ESPN Inc. (content partnership)
- Key people: Manuel V. Pangilinan (Chairman, TV5 Network Inc./NBC); Robert P. Galang (President and CEO, TV5 Network Inc.); Engr. Erwin V. Galang (Head, Regulatory and Industry Relations, Nation Broadcasting Corporation); Engr. Edward Benedict V. Galang (Network Engineering Operations, Nation Broadcasting Corporation)
- Launch date: January 13, 2019; 7 years ago
- Dissolved: March 7, 2020 (after 1 year, 54 days)
- Official website: Archived official website at the Wayback Machine (Archived 2020-03-06)
- Language: English (main); Filipino (secondary)
- Replaced: MTV Philippines (2001–2007); AksyonTV (2011–2019)
- Replaced by: One Sports

5 Plus (stylized as 5PLUS) was a short-lived Philippine free-to-air television network owned by Nation Broadcasting Corporation (NBC) and jointly operated by TV5 Network, Inc., a wholly owned subsidiary of MediaQuest Holdings, Inc. media arm of PLDT Beneficial Trust Fund.

Named after its parent station, 5 Plus served as complementary channel for 5 with its programs primarily produced by its sports division, ESPN5. 5 Plus was launched on January 13, 2019, as AksyonTV, a Filipino-language news and public affairs channel launched by TV5 in 2011, bifurcated into two new separate channels (the other one being One PH on Cignal).

However 14 months after its launch, on March 7, 2020, 5 Plus ceased its broadcasting to give way for One Sports.

== History ==
Prior to January 13, 2019, the network was known as AksyonTV, a 24-hour news channel launched by TV5 Network (then known as ABC Development Corporation) in February 2011 after taking over the airtime of NBC television and radio stations in 2010 (TV5 Network was acquired by NBC's parent MediaQuest Holdings from the Cojuangco / Media Prima group earlier that March). Its original programming included simulcasts from Radyo5 and independently produced newscasts and information programs from News5.

However, in June 2013, AksyonTV began to carry over the sports programs from AKTV, a primetime and weekend block of Sports5 airing over government-sequestered Intercontinental Broadcasting Corporation (IBC), after TV5 decided not to renew its agreement with IBC due to high airtime costs and low ratings. This move was heavily criticized by viewers for putting news programs and coverage on-hold. Such move, as well as losses and cost-cutting measures by TV5 Network, forces all news and current affairs programs produced by AksyonTV to be cancelled, leaving Radyo5 simulcasts intact (which in turn, is hampered by the addition of home shopping programs). Cignal, a sister company of TV5, soon launched its 24-hour satellite news channel, One News which combines the news content of the media companies owned by MediaQuest, including News5 on May 28, 2018, replacing News5-owned Bloomberg TV Philippines.

AksyonTV continued to reformat its programs in 2017, as the network started airing reruns of American series that air or aired on TV5, including Arrow and Supernatural, as well as the movie block Movie Max 5, home shopping and classic programs of TV5 in lieu of live sports programming.

Following TV5's relaunch as 5 in February 2018, shifting its position from a general entertainment network to a network focusing heavily on news and sports, on November 30, T5N announced that AksyonTV will be relaunched as 5 Plus on January 13, 2019. The new channel carried "atypical sports" programming with additional coverage from ESPN5 and new sports-related contents which would target a younger, more adventurous audience or the millennials.

Selected Radyo5 simulcast programs and other news content were later moved to a new stand-alone satellite Filipino news, One PH on Cignal, effectively bifurcating AksyonTV into two separate channels, with 5 Plus taking over analog channel 41 and digital subchannel channel 5.2 by DWET-TV.

Upon the appointment of Jane Basas as president and CEO of TV5 and Cignal TV took over the management and operations of TV5 Network in June 2019, 5's morning sports programming moved to 5 Plus. It included the National Football League and the NCAA (U.S.). The vacated morning block on the flagship station was used for reruns of old entertainment programs and expanded movie blocks.

On March 7, 2020, the channel was officially dissolved as One Sports took over its channel space the following day. Meanwhile, the original Cignal TV channel was renamed to One Sports+.

The former space of the channel on Cignal Channel 15, however, was still operating, showing a test card of a promotion launch of One Sports, and was removed on March 30 upon temporary sign-off of One Sports, due to coronavirus pandemic.

== Final programming ==
5 Plus' programming included extreme sports, collegiate sports, e-sports, sports entertainment, and other sports-related content. Occasionally as time permits, the network would take on the responsibility of airing sports programs produced by ESPN5 in the event that 5 was unable to carry them due to breaking news or any special programming. A selection of 5 Plus' sports coverage will be made available online through their official website and various social media platforms.

5 Plus is now home to the NFL and NCAA (U.S.). This is due to the decision of 5 to reformat its daytime lineup, which affected the schedules of both sporting leagues. Also, during the 2019 Southeast Asian Games, the NFL games were aired on a delayed, late night timeslot instead during days when the games were aired.

== See also ==
- TV5
- RPTV
- One Sports (sports division)
- One Sports (TV channel)
- PBA Rush
- AKTV
- Nation Broadcasting Corporation
- List of analog television stations in the Philippines
- Media of the Philippines
