= DXTY =

Defunct radio station in Zamboanga City, Philippines

Zamboanga City; Philippines
- Broadcast area: Zamboanga City, Basilan and surrounding areas
- Frequency: 101.1 MHz

Programming
- Format: Silent

Ownership
- Owner: Nation Broadcasting Corporation

History
- First air date: 1979; 47 years ago
- Last air date: 2004; 22 years ago
- Former names: MRS (1979-1998); Tony @ Rhythms (1998-2004)
- Call sign meaning: TonY (former branding)

Technical information
- Licensing authority: NTC

DXTY (101.1 FM) was a radio station owned and operated by Nation Broadcasting Corporation.

== History ==
The station began operations in 1979 as MRS 101.1, airing an adult contemporary format. In 1998, after NBC was acquired by PLDT subsidiary MediaQuest Holdings, the station rebranded as Tony @ Rhythms 101.1 and switched to an oldies format, ranging from the 50s and 60s. It went off the air in 2004.
