= Nation Broadcasting Corporation =

Philippine media company

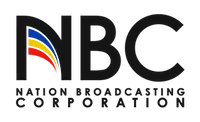

- TV5 Media Center at Reliance Street corner Sheridan Street, Mandaluyong City, where the Cignal TV corporate offices are located.
- Type: Subsidiary
- Industry: Mass media Broadcasting
- Founded: July 12, 1963 (radio broadcasts); January 1, 2001 (television broadcasts)
- Founder: Abelardo "Abel" L. Yabut, Sr.
- Headquarters: TV5 Media Center, Reliance cor. Sheridan Sts., Mandaluyong, Metro Manila, Philippines
- Key people: Manuel V. Pangilinan (Chairman); Victorico P. Vargas (President and CEO); Engr. Erwin V. Galang (Head, Regulatory and Industry Relations); Engr. Edward Benedict V. Galang (Network Engineering Operations); Raul Dela Cruz (General Manager); Jann Inigo (Officer in Charge)
- Brands: One Sports; True FM; True TV; Formerly: MTV Philippines; AksyonTV; 5 Plus
- Services: Television; Radio; Cable television; Satellite television
- Owner: MediaQuest Holdings (51.00%); Tri-Media Holdings, Inc. (18.62%); Megahertz Holdings, Co., Inc. (18.62%); Frequency Resources Holdings, Inc. (11.76%)
- Parent: PLDT BTF Holdings Inc. (Beneficial Trust Fund)
- Website: One Sports website; TRUE FM Website

Nation Broadcasting Corporation (NBC) is a Philippine radio and television broadcast company established in 1963. As of December 2013, NBC is a subsidiary of MediaQuest Holdings, Inc. under the PLDT Beneficial Trust Fund. NBC's radio and television stations are operated by sister network TV5 Network, Inc., with other being leased by different management; its corporate offices and studios are shared with the latter at 2/F TV5 Media Center, Reliance cor. Sheridan Sts., Mandaluyong, Metro Manila, Philippines.

NBC operates television stations with airtime being leased by its sister network TV5 Network, serving as the primary broadcasters of sports channel One Sports in Metro Manila, Baguio, Zamboanga, Cagayan de Oro, and General Santos; and as a UHF translator of free-to-air channel RPTV in Cebu and Davao, serving as a partial affiliate of Radio Philippines Network (RPN).

NBC also operates five radio stations under the brand FMR Philippines in Metro Manila, Baguio, Bacolod, General Santos, and Davao, serving as a partial affiliate of Philippine Collective Media Corporation (PCMC); while its Cebu and Cagayan de Oro radio stations became a relay station of 105.9 True FM in Metro Manila.

== History ==
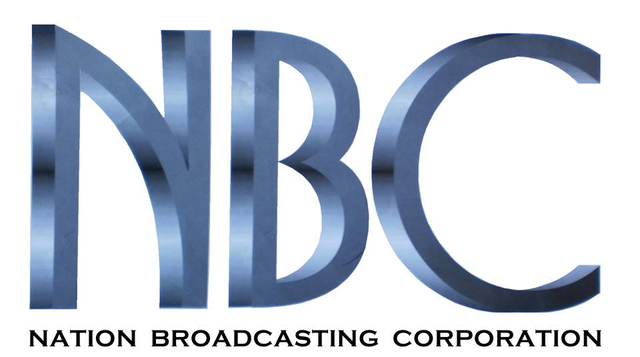
Former logo, used in 2007

=== Radio ===
==== AM Broadcasting ====
NBC was established by Abelardo Yabut Sr. in 1963, coinciding with the launch of DXYZ, the network's pioneer AM station in Zamboanga City, using a surplus transmitter that he bought from Deeco Electronics in Manila. Throughout the next years, NBC established a string of 10 AM stations in provincial areas.

In 1987, NBC acquired DWXX 1026 AM from Hypersonic Broadcasting Center and it was reformatted as DZAM, which featured news, commentaries, and well-balanced mix of entertainment and music programming. In 1998, DZAM changed its call letters to DZAR, and reformatted into a news and talk based station.

NBC also pioneered in many ways as the first network to broadcast 24 hours a day outside of Metro Manila (via DYCB 765 in Cebu City). It was the first network to bridge the archipelago with the utilization of satellite broadcasting, and continues to cover the live games of the Philippine Amateur Basketball League and the Philippine Basketball Association.

DZAR was the first to launch in 1998 through its nationwide transmission. At the time, DZAR 1026 and other NBC AM stations were rebranded as Angel Radyo. In 2005, The Kingdom of Jesus Christ (KJC) leader pastor Apollo Quiboloy (through Swara Sug Media Corporation) acquired all of NBC's AM stations and were rebranded as Sonshine Radio.

==== FM Broadcasting ====
In 1973, DWFM was established as the first FM station during the martial law era. It was the Yabut family's first entry to the nation's capital, and the third FM station in the said area. MRS 92.3 was an adult contemporary station, which played listeners' most requested songs. Two years later, in 1975, NBC put up the first FM station in Cebu City, DYNC 101.9; and DXFM 101.9 in Davao City. Its provincial stations carried the format as well. When PLDT media subsidiary MediaQuest Holdings, Inc. bought NBC from the consortium led by the Yabut family and real estate magnate Manny Villar in 1998, its stations rebranded into their respective names under the @ Rhythms banner.

DWFM in Manila became Joey and aired a smooth jazz and R&B format. Tony in Zamboanga aired oldies, ranging from the 1950s and 1960s. Rocky in Iligan aired modern rock. The remaining NBC stations in Baguio (Jesse), Cabanatuan (Donna), San Pablo, Laguna (Lovely), Naga (Nikki), Legazpi (Alex), Bacolod (Jamie), Cebu (Charlie), Davao (Danni), Butuan (Jake), Cagayan de Oro (Sandy), General Santos (Anna) and Cotabato (Marco) aired a contemporary hit radio format. The Rhythms banner was dropped in 2004, leaving their names intact.

On April 8, 2007, XFM began after 923 Joey was signed off on April 4, just before Holy Week. XFM featured ambient, chill, down-tempo, electronica, house, lounge, trip-hop and indie music on radio until its ground-breaking format in February 2008.

In October 2009, the Manila, Cebu and Davao stations discontinued their Smooth AC format. The Manila station was leased to Francis Lumen's All Youth Channels, and rebranded as U92, a CHR radio brand used as complementary to then AYC-operated MTV Philippines, broadcasting from a state-of-the-art studio at Silver City Mall in Pasig City. The U92 branding would eventually shut down on September 30, 2010, following the dissolution of AYC's lease agreement with NBC, as a result of MTV Philippines' shut down in February. The Cebu and Davao stations were leased to AudioWAV (WAV Atmospheric), a Makati City-based multinational instore radio company known for producing customized music and messaging for large chains across Southeast Asia and North America, and rebranded as WAV FM. The other provincial stations retained their formats.

On October 1, 2010, ABC Development Corporation, TV5 Network's legal predecessor and NBC corporate sister, took over the management of 92.3 FM. The result was the launch of Radyo5 92.3 News FM, the first news/talk station on the FM band. On November 8, it had its debut at 12:30 am and its first day of broadcasting began at 4 am. Beginning February 21, 2011, its provincial stations started carrying Radyo5 programming, either as relays of the Manila station, or as regional outlets with dedicated local programming.

=== Television ===
Nation Broadcasting Corporation (NBC-41) is a commercial UHF television station owned by First Pacific conglomerate and headed by Manuel Pangilinan, who is also the chairman of the telecommunications giant Philippine Long Distance Telephone Company (PLDT).

The name was unfamiliar to many Filipinos. NBC TV 41 used to be MTV Philippines. MTV ("Music Television") is a cable TV network which was originally devoted to music videos, especially popular rock music. MTV later became an outlet for a variety of material aimed at adolescents and young adults.

After six years of partnership in the Philippines, MTV Channel 41 has gone off the air after a multi-year deal with All Youth Channel (AYC). This follows the dissolution of the partnership with NBC. MTV Philippines became a defunct channel in February 2010. It was inactive until October 2010 when it began test broadcasting as TV5 and when ABC Development Corporation took over the management of NBC stations. It then took over the blocktime of UHF Channel 41, which alternates programming ABC Development Corporation. It was simulcast with Radyo5 92.3 News FM for a few months when it debuted on November 8. TV5 was scheduled to set up the first free-to-air interactive-radio-on-TV channel with a format similar to DZMM TeleRadyo and RHTV in the first quarter of 2011. It was set to broadcast after its initial simulcasting of 92.3 News FM if Associated Broadcasting Company introduced this UHF channel. It plans to initialize test broadcasts on various cable and satellite operators nationwide.

On February 21, 2011, AksyonTV launched as TV5 introduced the new UHF channel. AksyonTV was launched at exactly 4 am, airing its first program, Andar ng Mga Balita, hosted by Martin Andanar (is now with CGTN anchor), which was a simulcast of the morning news program on Radyo5 News FM of the same title.

After 8 years as news channel (sports content was later added), AksyonTV is announced to be rebranded as 5 Plus on January 13, 2019, with its programs consisting of mostly sports from ESPN5 and serving as a complementary channel for The 5 Network.

On March 8, 2020 (after 14 months as 5 Plus), the channel was relaunched when One Sports took over its channel space, making it available on free TV and other pay television operators. Meanwhile, its original satellite channel counterpart of One Sports was rebranded as One Sports+.

=== Recent developments ===
On February 1, 2024, in line with the launch of new channel RPTV, NBC TV stations in Cebu (DYAN-TV), Cagayan De Oro (DXCO-TV), and Davao (DXAN-TV) were converted into mirror feeds of the channel, replacing sister channel One Sports.

In October 2024, it was reported by news website Bilyonaryo that Prime Media Holdings (through Philippine Collective Media Corporation) has signed a blocktime and content licensing agreement with MediaQuest Holdings for NBC-owned 92.3 FM in Metro Manila and other provincial stations, effective November 4, converting into outlets of PCMC's Favorite Music Radio as its relay national feed. NBC confirmed the deal in a press statement on October 28, which also stated True FM's programs transferring to Bright Star-owned DWLA 105.9 MHz in Metro Manila and DXET 106.7 MHz in Davao (which TV5's previous owners divested to Interactive Broadcast Media in 2010, and was later operated by the city government of Digos in 2022 until 2024), while retaining its stations in Cebu and Cagayan de Oro and losing its stations in Baguio, Bacolod and General Santos to PCMC. The deal would eventually transfer NBC's FM assets and licenses to PCMC, subject to regulatory appeals and other commercial terms. NBC's owned TV assets are not included in the deal.

In line with the transition, NBC rebranded Radyo5 as the True Network, a multimedia brand that expands the presence of True FM into other media platforms including television (True TV, a pay TV channel on Cignal), podcast (True Pods), and digital/social media platforms (True Digi).

== Legislative franchise renewals ==
On April 8, 1998, Republic Act No. 8623 renewed NBC its congressional franchise for another 25 years, The law granted NBC a franchise to construct, install, establish, operate and maintain for commercial purposes and in the public interest, radio and/or television broadcasting stations in the Philippines. On March 29, 2022, Philippine President Rodrigo Duterte signed Republic Act No. 11667, which renewed NBC another 25 years to perform the same obligations, but now includes clauses involving digital television transmission in the Philippines.

== Assets ==
=== One Sports ===
One Sports is a TV5 Network Inc.'s sports channel with Nation Broadcasting Corporation (NBC) as its primary content provider, which aired on its flagship station, UHF channel 41, and was launched on March 8, 2020. One Sports serves as a sports channel for TV5 with its programs primarily produced by its sports division of the same name. It was formerly called 5 Plus, when it was launched on January 13, 2019, and AksyonTV, a Filipino-language news channel launched by TV5 in 2011–2019. It is also available in most satellite and cable TV systems.

=== True Network ===
True Network
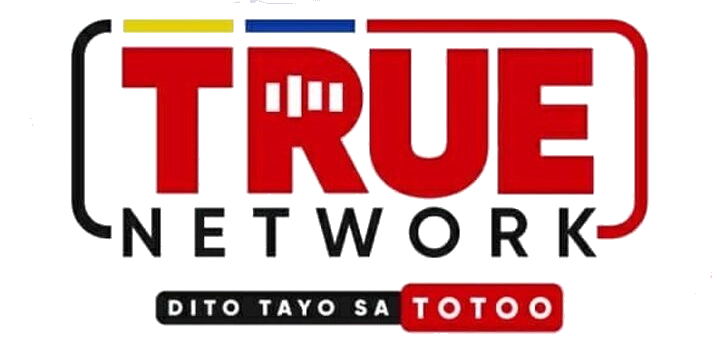
- Type: Broadcast FM radio network / free-to-air TV channel
- Country: Philippines
- Availability: Nationwide
- Founded: November 8, 2010
- Former names: Radyo5

True TV
- Type: Free-to-air television channel
- Country: Philippines
- Broadcast area: Nationwide
- Affiliates: News5; One PH
- Headquarters: TV5 Media Center, Reliance cor. Sheridan Sts., Mandaluyong, Metro Manila, Philippines

Programming
- Language: Filipino
- Picture format: 720p/1080i HDTV

Ownership
- Owner: Nation Broadcasting Corporation (MediaQuest Holdings)

History
- Launched: May 1, 2024 (soft launch; pay television); November 4, 2024 (official launch; pay television); August 29, 2026 (test broadcast; free-to-air television)
- Closed: August 15, 2026 (pay television)

Links
- Webcast: True Network

True Network is a multimedia platform brand of NBC. Formerly known as an all-news/talk radio network Radyo5 ("Radyo Singko") which broadcasts on FM stations owned by NBC and operated by sister company TV5 Network, True Network broadcasts its flagship FM radio brand known as True FM and its free-to-air television channel counterpart True TV (not to be confused with TruTV, an American pay TV channel). It can also be seen via Sulit TV and other DTT set-top boxes in Mega Manila since August 29, 2026 on channel 51. In addition, selected True Network programs are also aired on channels of TV5 (via RPTV) and Cignal TV (via One PH) as well as on podcasts.

True Network is available on FM radio thru 105.9 FM in Metro Manila and selected provincial stations nationwide.

== TV stations ==
=== One Sports ===
==== Analog ====
Branding	Callsign	Channel	Power	Type	Location
One Sports Manila	DWNB	41	30 kW	Originating	NBC Transmitter Site, Block 3, Emerald Hills, Brgy. Sta. Cruz, Antipolo
One Sports Baguio	DZYB	36	1 kW	Relay	Mt. Sto. Tomas, Benguet
One Sports Zamboanga	DXDE	29	5 kW	Relay	GBPI Bldg., Campaner Street, Zamboanga City
One Sports Cagayan de Oro	DXCO	29	10 kW	Relay	Macapagal Drive, Upper Bulua, Cagayan de Oro
One Sports General Santos	PA	22	1 kW	Relay	PLDT Bldg, Beatiles St., General Santos

==== Digital ====
Branding	Callsign	Channel	Frequency	Power	Type	Location
One Sports Manila	DWNB	51	695.143 MHz	5.5 kW	Originating	NBC Transmitter Site, Block 3, Emerald Hills, Brgy. Sta. Cruz, Antipolo

LCN	Video	Aspect	Short name	Programming	Notes
51.01	480i	16:9	One Sports	One Sports	Commercial free-to-air broadcast
51.02	480i	16:9	One PH	One PH	Commercial free-to-air broadcast
51.03	480i	16:9	True TV	105.9 True FM	Commercial free-to-air broadcast
51.35	240p	4:3	One Sports 1SEG	One Sports	1seg broadcast

=== RPTV ===
==== Analog ====
Branding	Callsign	Channel	Power	Type	Location
RPTV Cebu	DYAN	29	10 kW	Relay	TV5 Transmitter Compound, Mt. Busay, Brgy. Babag 1, Cebu City
RPTV Davao	DXAN	29	10 kW	Relay	TV5 Heights, Broadcast Ave., Shrine Hills, Brgy. Matina Crossing, Davao City

== Radio stations ==
=== True FM ===
The following stations are operated by TV5 Network, Inc. and serve as relay stations of 105.9 True FM based in Manila.

Branding	Callsign	Frequency	Location
True FM Cebu	DYFM	101.9 MHz	Cebu City
True FM Cagayan de Oro	DXRL	101.5 MHz	Cagayan de Oro

=== FMR Philippines ===
The following stations are operated by Philippine Collective Media Corporation.

Branding	Callsign	Frequency	Location
FMR Manila	DWFM	92.3 MHz	Metro Manila
FMR Baguio (Note: Relay station of 92.3 FM Radio Manila.)	DZYB	102.3 MHz	Baguio
FMR Bacolod	DYBC	102.3 MHz	Bacolod
FMR General Santos	DXOO	97.5 MHz	General Santos
FMR Davao (Note: Relay station of 89.5 FM Radio DavNor.)	DXFM	101.9 MHz	Davao City

=== Defunct/Inactive ===
==== AM Stations ====
Callsign	Frequency	Location	Notes
DZAR	1026 kHz	Metro Manila	Acquired by Sonshine Media Network International in 2005. Went off the air on December 19, 2023 due to NTC's suspension order, which was made indefinite on January 18, 2024.
DWAR	819 kHz	Laoag	Acquired by Sonshine Media Network International in 2005. Went off the air on December 19, 2023 due to NTC's suspension order, which was made indefinite on January 18, 2024.
DZRD	981 kHz	Dagupan	Acquired by Sonshine Media Network International in 2005. Went off the air on December 19, 2023 due to NTC's suspension order, which was made indefinite on January 18, 2024.
DZYT	765 kHz	Tuguegarao	Acquired by Sonshine Media Network International in 2005. Went off the air on December 19, 2023 due to NTC's suspension order, which was made indefinite on January 18, 2024.
DWSI	864 kHz	Santiago	Acquired by Sonshine Media Network International in 2005. Went off the air on December 19, 2023 due to NTC's suspension order, which was made indefinite on January 18, 2024.
DZYI	711 kHz	Ilagan	Acquired by Sonshine Media Network International in 2005. Went off the air on December 19, 2023 due to NTC's suspension order, which was made indefinite on January 18, 2024.
DWAY	1332 kHz	Cabanatuan	Acquired by Sonshine Media Network International in 2005. Went off the air on December 19, 2023 due to NTC's suspension order, which was made indefinite on January 18, 2024.
DZSP	864 kHz	San Pablo	Acquired by Sonshine Media Network International in 2005. Went off the air on December 19, 2023 due to NTC's suspension order, which was made indefinite on January 18, 2024.
DYAR	765 kHz	Cebu City	Acquired by Sonshine Media Network International in 2005. Went off the air on December 19, 2023 due to NTC's suspension order, which was made indefinite on January 18, 2024.
DXYZ	963 kHz	Zamboanga City	Acquired by Sonshine Media Network International in 2005. Went off the air on December 19, 2023 due to NTC's suspension order, which was made indefinite on January 18, 2024.
DXCL	1098 kHz	Cagayan de Oro	Acquired by Sonshine Media Network International in 2005. Went off the air on December 19, 2023 due to NTC's suspension order, which was made indefinite on January 18, 2024.
DXRD	711 kHz	Davao City	Acquired by Sonshine Media Network International in 2005. Went off the air on December 19, 2023 due to NTC's suspension order, which was made indefinite on January 18, 2024.
DXRE	837 kHz	General Santos	Acquired by Sonshine Media Network International in 2005. Went off the air on December 19, 2023 due to NTC's suspension order, which was made indefinite on January 18, 2024.
DXRO	945 kHz	Cotabato City	Acquired by Sonshine Media Network International in 2005. Went off the air on December 19, 2023 due to NTC's suspension order, which was made indefinite on January 18, 2024.
DXRB	873 kHz	Butuan	Acquired by Sonshine Media Network International in 2005. Went off the air on December 19, 2023 due to NTC's suspension order, which was made indefinite on January 18, 2024.
DXBL	801 kHz	Bislig	Acquired by Sonshine Media Network International in 2005. Went off the air on December 19, 2023 due to NTC's suspension order, which was made indefinite on January 18, 2024.
DZYZ	576 kHz	Olongapo	Off the air.
DWTT	1368 kHz	Tarlac City	Off the air.
DXRT	873 kHz	Tawi-Tawi	Off the air.

==== FM Stations ====
Callsign	Frequency	Location	Notes
DWYC	88.7 MHz	Cabanatuan	Off the air.
DWJY	94.3 MHz	San Pablo	Off the air.
DZMC	91.1 MHz	Tarlac City	Acquired by Acacia Broadcasting Corporation in 1998. Currently broadcasting as Jelexie Radio.
DZRB	95.9 MHz	Naga	Off the air.
DWMR	97.9 MHz	Legazpi	Off the air.
DXTY	101.1 MHz	Zamboanga City	Off the air.
DXRI	98.3 MHz	Iligan	Off the air.
DXOK	97.3 MHz	Cotabato City	Off the air.
DXEY	96.7 MHz	Butuan	Acquired by Baycomms Broadcasting Corporation in 2018. Currently broadcasting as Brigada News FM.
