= DXYZ-AM =

Radio station in Zamboanga City, Philippines

Sonshine Radio Zamboanga (DXYZ)
- Zamboanga City; Philippines
- Broadcast area: Zamboanga City, Basilan and surrounding areas
- Frequency: 963 kHz
- Branding: DXYZ Sonshine Radio

Programming
- Languages: Chavacano, Filipino
- Format: Silent
- Network: Sonshine Radio

Ownership
- Owner: Sonshine Media Network International

History
- First air date: 1963 (NBC DXYZ 963); 1998 (as DXYZ Angel Radyo); 2005 (as DXYZ Sonshine Radio)
- Last air date: December 2023 (NTC suspension order)
- Former frequencies: 970 kHz (1963–1978)
- Call sign meaning: Yabut Zamboanga; Last 3 letters of the alphabet

Technical information
- Licensing authority: NTC
- Power: 15,000 watts

Links
- Website: www.sonshineradio.com

DXYZ (963 AM) Sonshine Radio was a Philippine radio station owned and operated by Sonshine Media Network International. The station's studio is located at the 4th floor, MindPro Building, La Purisima St., Zamboanga City.

== History ==
Established on July 12, 1963, DXYZ was the first station of Nation Broadcasting Corporation under the helm of Abelardo L. Yabut Sr. It is also the second in Zamboanga City. Its offices and studios were located then in the third floor of Evangelista Building, the tallest in the city by that time. It transmitted then on a 1-kilowatt surplus transmitter from Deeco Electronics through its tower on the building rooftop. Eddie Rodriguez, who later on became the city councilor, was the station's first manager by later part of that year.

It was known as NBC DXYZ Radyo 963 and later on Angel Radyo 963. In 1998, PLDT media subsidiary MediaQuest Holdings bought NBC from the consortium led by the Yabut family and real estate magnate Manny Villar. In 2005, The Kingdom of Jesus Christ (KJC) leader, pastor Apollo C. Quiboloy purchased all of NBC AM radio stations, including DXYZ, and rebranded them as Sonshine Radio.

On mid-December 2023, the station, along with the rest of the network, had its operations suspended by the National Telecommunications Commission for 30 days, through an order dated December 19 but was publicized two days later, in response to a House of Representatives resolution, in relation to the alleged franchise violations.
