= DYFM-FM =

Radio station in Cebu City, Philippines

True FM Cebu (DYFM)
Repeater of DWLA Manila
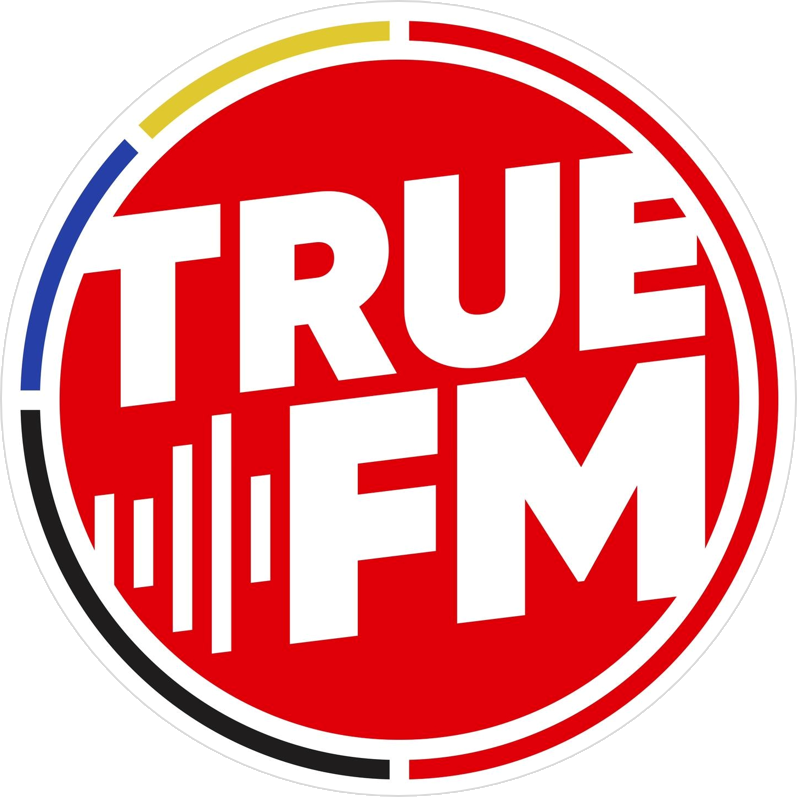
- Cebu City; Philippines
- Broadcast area: Metro Cebu and surrounding areas
- Frequency: 101.9 MHz (FM Stereo)
- Branding: 101.9 True FM

Programming
- Language: Filipino
- Format: News, Public Affairs, Talk, Drama
- Network: True FM
- Affiliations: One PH; True TV

Ownership
- Owner: Nation Broadcasting Corporation
- Sister stations: DYET-TV (TV5); DYKC-TV (RPTV); DYAN-TV (RPTV Mirror feed)

History
- First air date: February 1, 1975
- Former call signs: DYNC (1975–2008)
- Former names: MRS (1975–1998); Charlie @ Rhythms 101.9 (1998–2005); 101.9 Charlie (2005-2008); WAV FM (2009–2011); Radyo5 (2011-2024)
- Call sign meaning: Frequency Modulation

Technical information
- Licensing authority: NTC
- Class: A, B, C, D, E
- Power: 10,000 watts
- ERP: 32,000 watts

Links
- Website: news.tv5.com.ph

DYFM (101.9 FM) is a radio station owned and operated by Nation Broadcasting Corporation, a sister company of TV5 Network Inc. It serves as a relay station of True FM in Manila. The station's transmitter is located inside the TV5 Transmitter Compound, Mt. Busay, Brgy. Babag 2, Cebu City. It is considered to be the first Stereo FM station in Cebu City.

== History ==
=== 1975–1998: MRS ===
DYNC was Cebu's first FM station established on February 1, 1975, as MRS 101.9 (Most Requested Song). It carried an adult contemporary format, known for playing the most requested song every hour. Back then, it was located at Vacation Hotel Cebu along Juana Osmeña Ext. and later moved to Krizia Bldg. along Gorordo Ave.

=== 1998–2008: Charlie ===
Charlie 101.9 logo from 2005 to 2009

On September 1, 1998, after NBC was acquired by PLDT Beneficial Trust Fund's broadcasting division MediaQuest Holdings, Inc from the consortium of the Yabut family and then House Speaker Manny Villar, the station was reformatted as Charlie @ Rhythms 101.9 with a Top 40 format. On August 1, 2005, the Rhythms tag was dropped and became 101.9 Charlie, with the slogan "Get your Groove On". At the same time, it reformatted into a Smooth AC station. However, in 2008, lack of advertisers' and financial problems led to 101.9 Charlie's closure of operations in Cebu after 33 years of broadcasting.

=== 2009–2011: WAV FM ===
On September 27, 2009, DYNC returned on the air, this time as DYFM. On October 1, Makati-based Audiowav Media (WAV Atmospheric) took over the station's operations, along with NBC's stations in Visayas and Mindanao, and relaunched it as 101.9 WAV FM. It carried a Top 40 format with the slogan "Philippines' Hit Music Station". At that time, its studios moved from Krizia Bldg. along Gorordo Ave. to its transmitter site in Antuwanga Road, Quiot Pardo. The Radio Station was programmed by Caloy Hinolan. It went off the air for the second time in mid-2011.

=== 2011–2024: Radyo5 ===
Radyo5 News FM logo from November 2022 until March 7, 2023

On December 1, 2011, seven months after TV5 Cebu was relaunched, ABC Development Corporation (TV5) took over the station's operations and relaunched it as Radyo5 101.9 News FM, the first and only originating news/talk radio station on the FM band that delivers news and information. The station transferred to its current home at TV5 Complex in Kalunasan, while its transmitter moved to Busay Hills and upgraded its power to a newly improved 10,000-watt stereo.

It began simulcasting DWFM 92.3 Manila since then. On November 12, 2012, the station launched its local programming. It began its main broadcast at 5:30am PHT with the first local radio program entitled Frankahai Ta!, anchored by Atty. Frank Malilong Jr. After his resignation in May 2014 for health reasons, the show was replaced by Rated JP with Jaypee Lao-Kwatsera as host. In September 2016, following the cancellation of Aksyon Bisaya, Radyo5 Cebu ceased its local programming as part of cost-cutting measures. As a result, it was downgraded back to a relay station of DWFM.

In 2017, REH Herbal Trading and Manufacturing, owned by Ka Rey Herrera and distributor of KINGS Herbal, took over the station's weekday morning slot under a blocktime agreement.

On December 16, 2021, Radyo5 Cebu temporarily went off the air due to Typhoon "Rai" (Odette). Four days later, it went back on air.

In April 2024, it changed its sub-brand to True FM (from its sister stations in Manila and Davao) and adopted the slogan "Dito Tayo sa Totoo!" and it's Cebuano slogan, "Diri Kita sa Tinuod!".

=== 2024-present: True FM ===
On November 4, 2024, the station dropped the Radyo5 branding as part of the newly established True Network. It became a semi-satellite station of 105.9 FM in Manila, which in turn replaced 92.3 FM. It is one of the two radio stations that was not covered by the deal between Nation Broadcasting Corporation (NBC) and Philippine Collective Media Corporation.

In May 2025, after REH's blocktime with the station expired, it relegated to a full-time relay station, albeit retaining its local advertising.
