= DZRB-FM =

Defunct radio station in Naga, Camarines Sur, Philippines

DZRB
- Naga; Philippines
- Broadcast area: Camarines Sur and surrounding areas
- Frequency: 95.9 MHz

Programming
- Format: Silent

Ownership
- Owner: Nation Broadcasting Corporation

History
- First air date: 1985
- Last air date: 2012

Technical information
- Licensing authority: NTC

DZRB (95.9 FM) was a radio station owned and operated by Nation Broadcasting Corporation.

== History ==
The station began operations in 1985 as MRS 95.9, airing an adult contemporary format. In 1998, after NBC was acquired by PLDT subsidiary MediaQuest Holdings, the station rebranded as Nikki @ Rhythms 95.9 and switched to a Top 40 format. In 2002, Earthsounds Broadcasting System took over the station's operations and rebranded it as 95.9 Crosswave, carrying a smooth jazz format. In 2006, Southern Broadcasting Network took over the station's operations and rebranded it as Mom's Radio 95.9. In 2009, Audiowav Media took over the station's operations, along with NBC's stations in Visayas and Mindanao, and relaunched it as WAV FM, carrying a Top 40 format. In December 1 2011, it became a relay station of Radyo5 News FM Manila. It went off the air sometime in late 2012 due to cost cutting measures.
