= DXRL =

Radio station in Cagayan de Oro, Philippines

True FM Cagayan de Oro (DXRL)
Relay of DWLA Manila
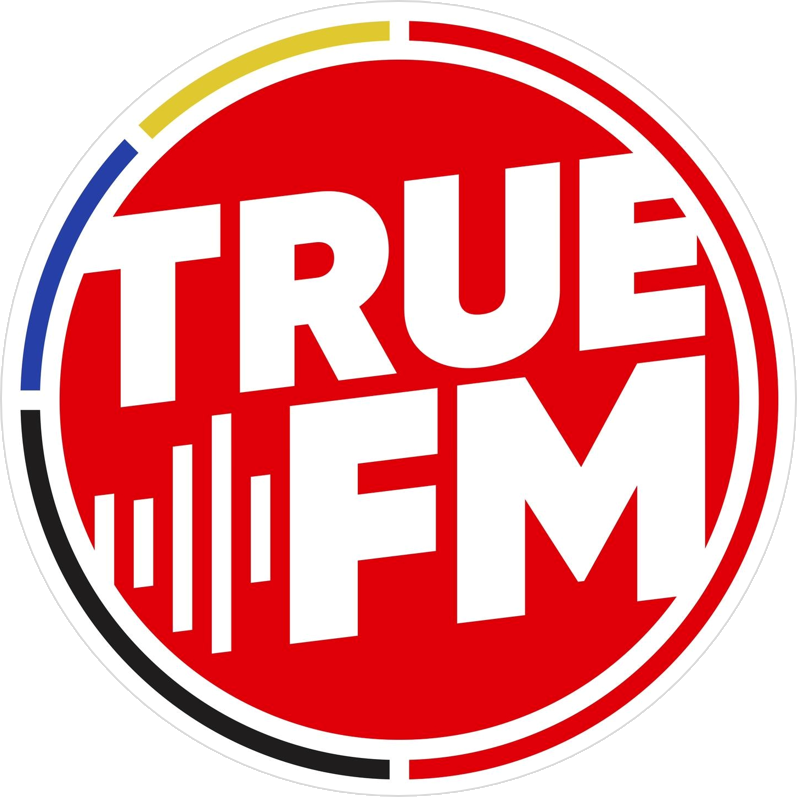
- Cagayan de Oro; Philippines
- Broadcast area: Misamis Oriental, parts of Lanao del Norte and Bukidnon
- Frequency: 101.5 MHz
- Branding: 101.5 True FM

Programming
- Language: Filipino
- Format: News, Public Affairs, Talk
- Network: True FM
- Affiliations: One PH; True TV

Ownership
- Owner: Nation Broadcasting Corporation (TV5 Network Inc.)
- Sister stations: DXTE-TV (TV5); DXCO-TV (One Sports)

History
- First air date: 1976
- Former names: MRS (1976–1998); Sandy @ Rhythms 101.5 (1998–2005); Sandy 101.5 (2005–2011); Radyo5 (2011–2024)

Technical information
- Licensing authority: NTC
- Class: B C D
- Power: 10,000 watts
- ERP: 30,000 watts

DXRL (101.5 FM) is a radio station owned and operated by Nation Broadcasting Corporation, a sister company of TV5 Network Inc. It currently serves as a relay station of True FM in Manila. The station's transmitter is located along Macapagal Drive (formerly Greenhills Road), Upper Bulua, Cagayan de Oro.

== History ==
The station began operations in 1976 as MRS 101.5 with an adult contemporary format. In 1998, after NBC was acquired by PLDT subsidiary MediaQuest Holdings, the station rebranded as Sandy @ Rhythms 101.5 and switched to a Top 40 format. In 2005, the "Rhythms" tag was dropped.

In 2011, months after TV5 took over operations of the stations, it became a relay station of 92.3 FM based in Manila, which was broadcasting as Radyo5. In 2023, the branding transitioned to True FM. On November 4, 2024, True FM transferred to 105.9 FM as part of the rebranded True Network. It is one of the two radio stations of Nation Broadcasting Corporation (NBC) not part of the acquisition of Philippine Collective Media Corporation (PCMC).
