= AKTV =

Defunct primetime sports programming block in the Philippines

- Type: sports programming block
- Branding: AKTV on IBC-13
- Country: Philippines
- Availability: Defunct
- Founded: June 5, 2011
- Owner: TV5 Network (MediaQuest Holdings)
- Parent: Sports5/ESPN5/One Sports
- Launch date: June 5, 2011
- Dissolved: May 31, 2013
- Former names: Viva TV on IBC (block) (1999–2003)
- Former affiliations: Intercontinental Broadcasting Corporation
- Official website: www.interaktv.ph
- Language: Filipino (main); English (secondary)
- Replaced by: IBC programming Sports5/ESPN5 programming (AksyonTV/5 Plus, Hyper/One Sports and RPTV)

AKTV (pronounced "active", officially branded as AKTV on IBC) was the primetime sports programming block in the Philippines. Owned and operated by TV5, it occupied the 5 pm to 11 pm timeslot of IBC; weekend coverage usually began at 11 am to 11 pm. It started on June 5, 2011, and it ended on May 31, 2013 due to high airtime costs and low ratings.

== History ==
IBC signed a blocktime agreement with TV5's sports division Sports5 to air live sports coverage via its new programming block AKTV. It was launched on June 5, 2011, with the AKTV Run held outside SM Mall of Asia in Bay City, Pasay.

=== Cancellation ===
However, on April 11, 2013, TV5 announced that the blocktime agreement with IBC would not be renewed, meaning AKTV would cease broadcasting on May 31, 2013. The move was due to high cost and low ratings given by IBC to air over the channel. Broadcasts of the NCAA basketball tournament, and the United Football League were moved to AksyonTV/5 Plus, although Sports5 (now One Sports)-produced PBA games continue to air in the channel until October 6. IBC, later signed another blocktime agreement with Asian Television Content Corporation, to air a new set of primetime programs under ATC @ IBC, which is set to aired on June 2, 2014. Until August 31, 2014, the ATC @ IBC primetime block was cancelled due to poor ratings and loss of advertisers' support. It is later noted that, despite the expiration of blocktime agreement, TV5 continues to use IBC-13's Broadcast City facilities for sports events including its 2014 FIBA Basketball World Cup coverage; as MediaQuest Holdings is a possible bidder for the privatization of IBC-13. However, MediaQuest could not join the privatization bid due to ownership rules and regulations that MediaQuest owns TV5 and AksyonTV.

== Programming ==
=== Final sports specials/coverage ===
- 2011 FIBA Americas Championship (August 31–September 12, 2011)
- 2011 FIBA Asia Champions Cup
- 2011 FIBA Asia Championship
- 2011 LBC Ronda Pilipinas
- 2011 PBA Draft (August 28, 2011)
- 2011 SEA Games
- 2011 William Jones Cup
- 2012 AFF Suzuki Cup (November–December 2012)
- 2012 DFL-Supercup
- 2012 FIBA Asia Cup
- 2012 London Olympics
- 2012 William Jones Cup
- AIBA European Continental Championships
- AIBA Junior World Championships
- Aliwan Fiesta 2012
- Australian Open (2012, 2013)
- ATP World Master Tours
- Barclays Premier League
- Bundesliga
- BWF Grand Prix
- EuroBasket 2011
- F1 Grand Prix
- La Liga
- PartyPoker.com World Cup of Pool
- PBA Dream Game 2012 (February 2012)
- RHB Singapore Cup
- Smart Ultimate All-Star Weekend (July 23–24, 2011)
- UEFA Euro 2012
- Wimbledon Championship
- World 10-Ball Championship
- World Sumo Challenge

=== Former ===
- AKTV Center (2011–2013)
- Bigtime Bakbakan (2011–2013)
- Fight Sports BWF (2011–2013)
- Fight Sports Greatest Classics (2011–2013)
- Fight Sports Knockouts (2011–2013)
- Fight Sports Wide World of Fights (2011–2013)
- Fight Sports World Championship Kick Boxing (2011–2013)
- Fight Quest (2011–2013)
- Knockout Sportsworld (2011–2013)
- NCAA on AKTV (2012)
- Pacific Xtreme Combat (2011–2013)
- PBA on AKTV (2011–2013)
- PBA D-League (2011–2013)
- Shakey's V-League (2012–2013)
- The Main Event (2011–2013)
- United Football League (2011–2013)
- Whacked Out Sports (2012–2013)
- WWE Bottom Line (2012–2013)
- WWE SmackDown (2012–2013)
