= DWLA-FM =

True FM (DWLA)
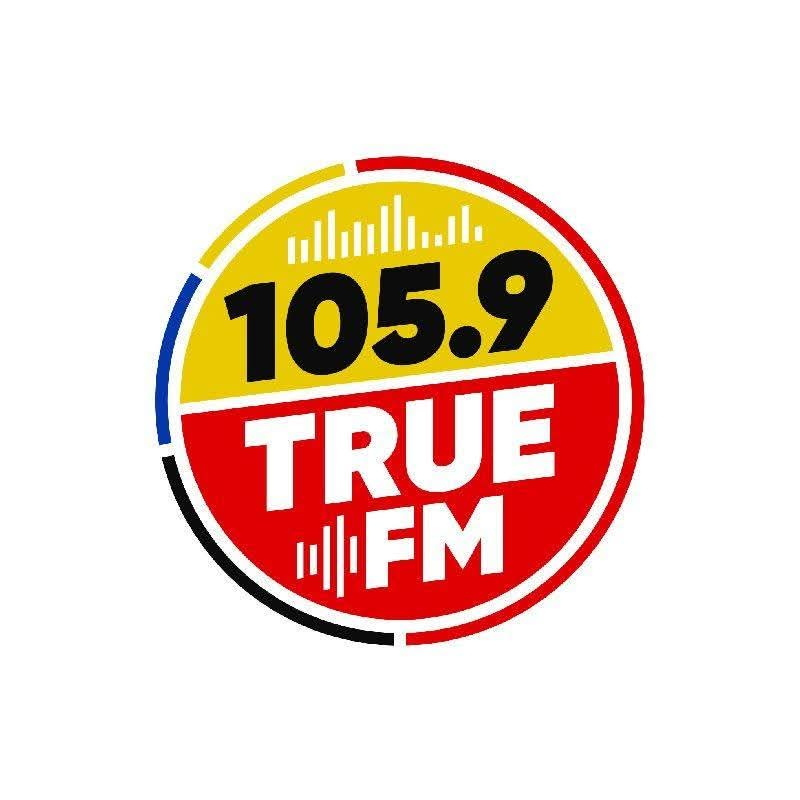
- Mandaluyong; Philippines
- Broadcast area: Mega Manila and surrounding areas
- Frequency: 105.9 MHz
- Branding: 105.9 True FM

Programming
- Language: Filipino
- Format: News, Public Affairs, Talk, Drama
- Network: True Network
- Affiliations: One PH; One News; TV5 News; Nation Broadcasting Corporation; Vanguard Radio Network; 92.3 FMR Manila

Ownership
- Owner: Bright Star Broadcasting Network Corporation
- Operator: TV5 Network, Inc.
- Sister stations: Through TV5: DWET-TV (TV5); DZKB-TV (RPTV); DWNB-TV (One Sports)

History
- First air date: 1989
- Former names: LA (1989–99); DWLA (2000–2002); Blazin' (2003–07); RJ Underground Radio (2007–11); Radio High (2011–14); Retro (2014–18); Like FM (2018–19); Lite FM (2019); Neo Retro (2019–24)
- Call sign meaning: We Love Adventure (former slogan)

Technical information
- Licensing authority: NTC
- Class: A (clear frequency)
- Power: 20,000 watts
- ERP: 60,000 watts
- Repeaters: Cebu City: DYFM 101.9 MHz; Cagayan de Oro: DXRL 101.5 MHz

Links
- Webcast: Live Stream
- Website: truefm.ph

DWLA (105.9 FM), branded as True FM, is a radio station owned by Bright Star Broadcasting Network Corporation, and operated under an airtime lease agreement by TV5 Network, Inc. It serves as the flagship station of True Network, one of the assets of TV5 News and Nation Broadcasting Corporation. Its studios are located at the 2nd Floor of TV5 Media Center, Reliance cor. Sheridan Sts., Brgy. Highway Hills, Mandaluyong; its transmitter is located at NBC Compound, Emerald Hills Subdivision, Sumulong Highway, Brgy. Santa Cruz, Antipolo. Bright Star's sales office is located in Southland Estates, Las Piñas.

== History ==
=== 1989-1999: LA 105.9 ===
The station was established in 1989 as LA 105.9 by Bright Star Broadcasting Network Corporation, owned by polo patron and Banco Filipino owner Albert “Bobby” Aguirre. Under the helm of Production Director and Chief Announcer Ramon "The Doctor" Zialcita, LA initially carried a pop format in its early years. At that time, it was broadcasting from the 19th floor of the Philcomcen Building in Ortigas. In April 1990, it went off the air after its original studios were affected by a major fire.

In February 1991, LA returned on air, albeit transmitting in a low powered signal, airing classical and middle of the road music. By August 1992, it adapted a world music format. On November 30, 1993, the format was dropped due to shortages of music material and a need for a stable revenue. In preparation for its transition the station played non stop Christmas songs from December 1 to 25 before going off the air the next day.

On December 27, 1993, LA adopted a modern rock format, with the tagline Rock of the World. It was known for introducing underground bands to the Pinoy rock scene, such as Erectus, Backdraft, Mutiny, Re-Animator, Dahong Palay, Datu's Tribe, and Teeth, whose song "Laklak" became a hit. Among its on-air talents were Bob Magoo, Cool Carla, Luis "The Ghost" Rocha, Carlos, and Ed Formoso.

In July 1998, LA shifted to an automated electronic dance music format with the tagline We Love Adventure. The format lasted for six months.

=== 2000-02: DWLA 105.9 ===
By 2000, the station was simply known as DWLA 105.9 and diversified its programming beyond pop to include Latino, techno, reggae, world music, and occasionally OPM, rap, rock, hip-hop, and jazz. During the 2001 elections, independent record producer Ed Formoso introduced “pop and politics” programming with political features for young adult voters.

=== 2003-07: Blazin' 105.9 ===
On October 20, 2003, the station relaunched as Blazin' 105.9. It was operated by Empire Entertainment, owned by radio veteran Marcelle John Marcelino (DJ Htown), and Cavite businessman-politician Mayor Dino Chua, President of Cavite Broadcasting Network.

Blazin' played various rap, hip-hop, and R&B, including underground hip hop, and produced the first Black Eyed Peas concert in the Philippines.

In late 2006, Empire Entertainment subleased the station to Ramon Jacinto's Rajah Broadcasting Network. It was inactive from January to July 2007, with Wave 89.1 taking over the Pinoy hip hop scene in 2007 and creating the 1st Urban Music Awards in 2010.

=== 2007-11: UR 105.9 ===
UR logo from 2007 to 2010

On July 15, 2007, 105.9 FM resumed broadcasting as RJ Underground Radio UR 105.9, airing a mainstream rock format. Functioning as a child station of RJ 100.3 FM, it mirrored the pre-1986 DZRJ Rock of Manila and even LA 105.9, playing three songs in a row (modern rock, classic rock, and Pinoy rock), with exceptions for special programs and “Sunday Rock Jam.” Initially, it primarily used public address systems on weekdays, later introducing on-air talent. Veteran DJs from the original RJ Rock of Manila hosted "Sunday Rock Jam." Within months, RJ UR increased its transmission to 25,000 watts, though its signal remained limited in distant areas.

Sundays on RJ UR 105.9 featured legendary DZRJ rock jocks Jamie Evora (“The Spirit”), Hoagy Pardo (“Cousin Hoagy”), Mike Llamas (“Stoney Burke”), and Alfred Gonzalez (“The Madman”), broadcasting from the United States. Also, legendary rock DJ Dante David (“Howlin' Dave”) returned to FM radio and the RJ group with his Sunday afternoon program, “RJ Pinoy Rock and Rhythm,” following a stint with the short-lived Rock 990. David's program continued until his death in May 2008 due to health reasons.

After four years, UR management decided not to renew the lease on 105.9. On May 28, 2011, UR 105.9 relaunched and migrated to the internet as UR Faceradio, though the station continued to air the online feed until the end of June. It was later discovered that Rajah Broadcasting Network had an issue with Bright Star Broadcasting Network Corporation over its unauthorized use of the network.

=== 2011–14: Radio High ===
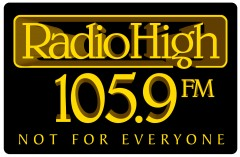
Radio High logo from 2011 to 2014

On July 1, 2011, Francis Lumen's Hi-Definition Radio Inc. acquired the station's airtime lease, relocating studios to Silver City Mall in Pasig.

On July 14, 2011, it began test broadcasts as Radio High 105.9, adopting a smooth jazz and varied format similar to the defunct 923 Joey and 106.7 Dream FM. Its programming included quarter-hour segments like “Global High” (world music), “High on the 80s” (80s music), “Lite Jazz High” (smooth jazz), and “Natural High” (New Age Music), alongside sponsored programs and “105.9 Hours of Christmas” (a 106-hour Christmas music marathon, later adopted by RJFM).

Due to financial losses, Lumen subleased the station in February 2014, with the format airing until March 27, 2014.

=== 2014–18: Retro 105.9 ===
Retro 105.9 logo from 2017 to May 25, 2018

On March 1, 2014, DCG Radio-TV Network, led by Joselito Ojeda and Domingo C. Garcia, subleased the station's airtimer. Concurrently, a team of veteran DJs, headed by Jonathan “JJ Sparx” Jabson, developed a new format playing “songs listeners grew up with.” After teasers, the station relaunched as Retro 105.9 DCG FM on March 28, 2014, at 5:00 AM PHT. This format quickly became successful, boosting listenership and inspiring similar "retro" stations across the Philippines.

In October 2014, Jabson resigned, leading to Cris Hermosisima (DJ Cris Cruise) being hired as a consultant and subsequent changes in the DJ lineup. Retro 105.9 also introduced new programs like “Discoteria” and “Retro In Love.” Willy "Hillbilly Willy" Inong took over as station manager on October 12, 2015, but left on June 4, 2017, due to “creative differences.”

For nearly two years, Retro 105.9 was Nielsen's #1 station in the Niche market. However, by 2017, the station reduced its terrestrial broadcast hours to 19 daily for transmitter maintenance, continuing online overnight. On November 20, 2017, the “DCG FM” tag was removed, and most DJs were dismissed, leaving the station largely automated outside of newscasts.

Retro 105.9 ceased broadcasting abruptly on May 25, 2018, at 6:00 PM. It was later disclosed that DCG Radio-TV Network failed to pay its debts and did not renew its sublease with Bright Star.

=== 2018-19: Like FM ===
On May 26, 2018, 105.9 FM returned to air as Like FM 105.9, featuring an Adult Top 40 and talk radio format. The station's airtime was taken over by a new investor group, including former personalities Jabson and Manny “Jimmy Jam” Pagsuyuin. Regular broadcasting began on July 28, 2018, at 6:00 AM.

In February 2019, after Jabson's departure, Like FM adopted the tagline “The Best of the '90s and Beyond” and started playing jazz and R&B during late nights, while largely maintaining its format.

Like FM 105.9 ceased operations on July 23, 2019, at midnight, after previously announcing a reformat.

=== 2019: Lite FM ===
On July 24, 2019, the station rebranded as Lite FM 105.9, adopting a smooth jazz format for the second time in its history.

However, this branding was dropped by early December of the same year, and the station entered a period of transition.

=== 2019–24: Neo Retro ===
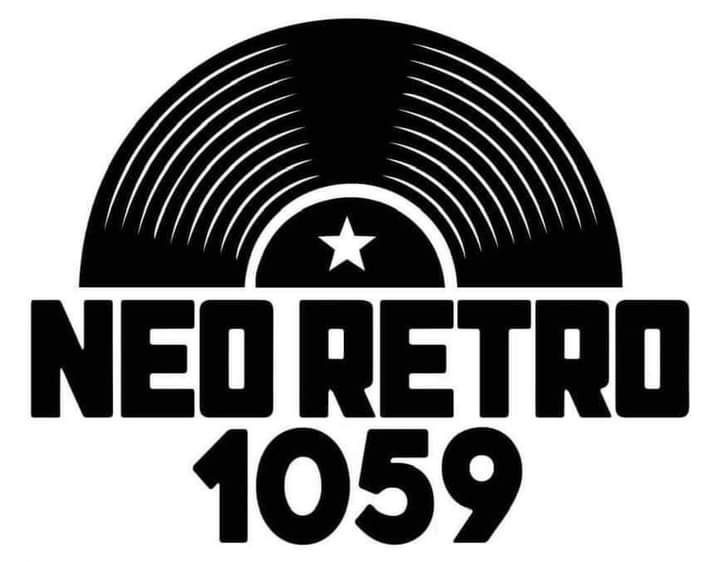
Neo Retro logo from 2019 to 2024.

On December 5, 2019, at 4:00 PM, the station began carrying the brand Neo Retro 1059 and adapted an adult hits format. Its official broadcast commenced on January 1, 2020. In May 2021, the station relocated its studio from Pasig to Southland Estates, Las Piñas. Neo Retro 1059 signed off permanently at midnight on November 4, 2024.

=== 2024–present: True FM ===
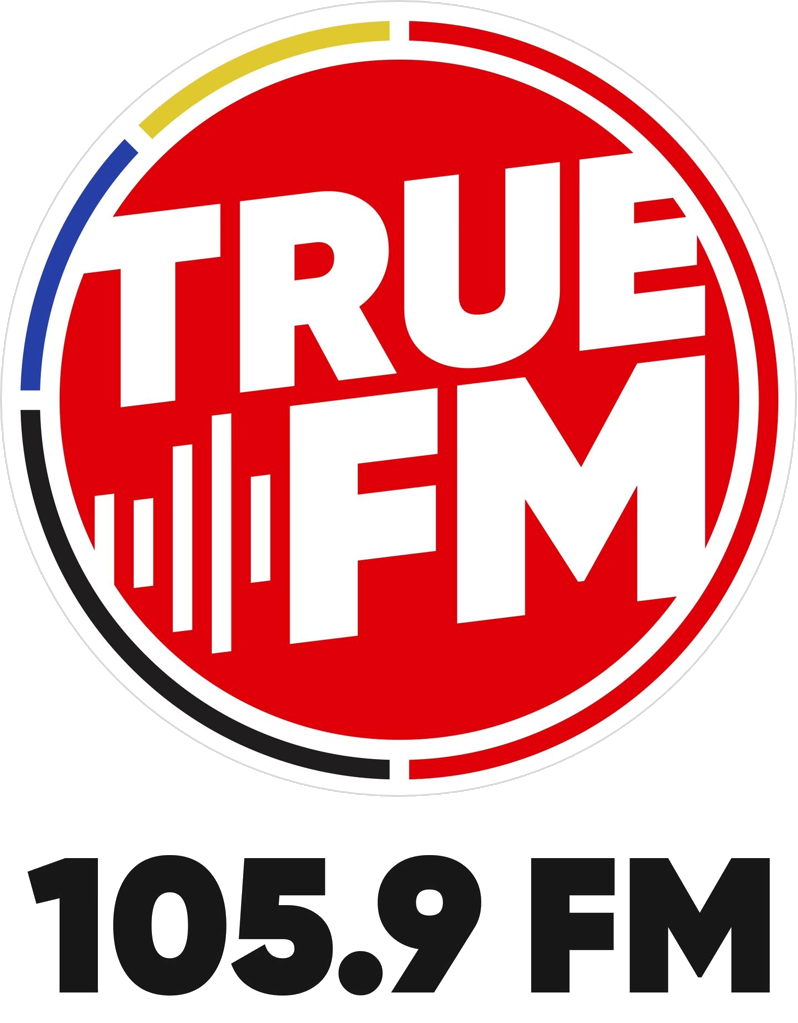
True FM old logo from 2024 to 2026.

On November 4, 2024, at 3:00 AM, the station returned on air as 105.9 True FM under the management of TV5 Network. This move followed True FM's transition from Nation Broadcasting Corporation's former frequency, a result of Philippine Collective Media Corporation's airtime lease and content agreement with NBC for most of its radio assets.

In November 9, 2026, 92.3 FMR (including selected relay stations) began simulcasting True FM's flagship morning show Ted Failon at DJ Chacha sa True FM.

== Notable presenters ==
=== Current ===
- Sen. Raffy Tulfo
- Ted Failon
- Cheryl Cosim
- Jove Francisco
- Cristy Fermin
- Marc Logan
- Mon Gualvez
- Noli Eala
- Jervi Wrightson
- Lourd de Veyra
- Laila Chikadora
- Gus Abelgas
- Stanley Chi
- Jiggy Manicad
- Julius Babao
- Christine Bersola-Babao
- Manuel Mogato
- Amy Pamintuan
- Ronald Llamas

=== Former ===
- Bro. Jun Banaag, O.P.

== See also ==
- TV5
- One Sports
- One PH
- DWET-TV
- RPTV
- TV5 News
- Nation Broadcasting Corporation
- List of television and radio stations owned by TV5 Network
