= TV5 Media Center =

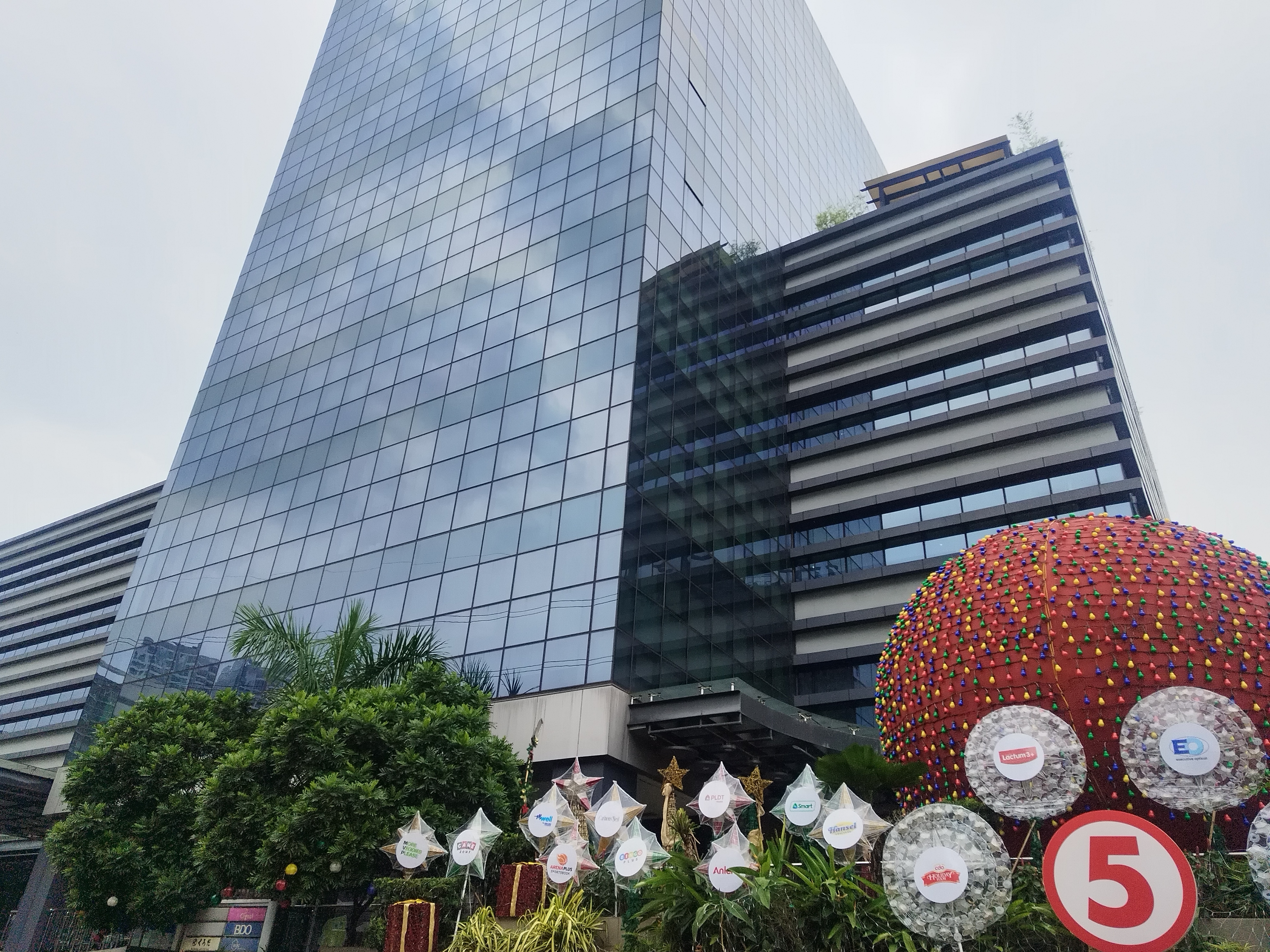

- Location in Metro Manila Location in Luzon Location in the Philippines

General information
- Type: Office, studio, broadcasting
- Location: Reliance corner Sheridan Streets, Barangay Highway Hills, Mandaluyong, Metro Manila, Philippines
- Coordinates: 14°34′23.86″N 121°3′15.29″E
- Construction started: 2011; 15 years ago
- Opening: December 23, 2013; 12 years ago
- Cost: ₱6 billion
- Owner: TV5 Network

Technical details
- Floor count: 9
- Floor area: 6,300 square metres (68,000 sq ft)

The TV5 Media Center (also known as the Launchpad Center) serves as the headquarters and broadcast complex of TV5 and affiliate companies Cignal TV, Nation Broadcasting Corporation, Philex Mining Corporation and Voyager Innovations, Inc. The building houses 105.9 True FM, TV5, RPTV and One Sports.

== Construction ==
The construction of TV5 Media Center began In January 2011 in the site where a former PLDT warehouse was located, ten months after TV5 was acquired by MediaQuest Holdings, a media conglomerate of PLDT Beneficial Trust Fund, from the consortium led by former PLDT Chairman Antonio "Tony Boy" Cojuangco, Jr. and Malaysian media conglomerate Media Prima. The media center was the network's effort to update its existing technologies for a seamless transition to digital broadcasting and to acquire a clearer broadcast signal, as well as to consolidate business and studio production operations from its original Novaliches broadcast facility, which was used from ABC/TV5's reopening in 1992, the Delta Theater in Quezon City, Broadway Centrum in New Manila (previously owned by Broadway Centrum Condominium Corporation), Broadcast City in Capitol Hills, Old Balara (which was also used by Eat Bulaga! during its first years), the Marajo Tower in Bonifacio Global City and the L. V. Locsin Building in Makati.

The construction of the new facility included two phases. The first phase was the construction of the news department, and its target completion was the fourth quarter of 2011. The second phase involved the entertainment department, which was targeted for completion the following year. ₱6 billion of capital expenditures from the parent MediaQuest was used in constructing the facilities. However, the restricted cash flow in the earlier years of construction caused a delay in completion. The first phase was completed in December 2013, while the second phase was targeted to be completed in November 2016. The main corporate and broadcast operations of TV5 Network, Inc. were transferred to the new facility between the said dates. However, TV5's transmitter and production of some programs remained in the original Novaliches studios.

In 2017, Phase 2 of TV5 Media Center was renamed to "Launchpad Center", which serves as the headquarters of Voyager Innovations, Inc. The 3rd floor serves as the staff office of Pilipinas Global Network Ltd. Some of the network's subsidiaries are also based here. MQ Digital. Also, the management and staffs of MQ Studios and MQ Play.

Later in 2025, MediaQuest Ventures partnered with Wilyonaryo host Willie Revillame and Golden Pacific Holdings for the construction of the 10-storey P4-billion multi-purpose building situated at the TV5 Media Center, with the Phase 1 expected to be completed by year-end. The building, which was later christened as the MVP Studios, will have different facilities such as the new studios for Wilyonaryo, Eat Bulaga!, News5 programs and other planned programs for all MediaQuest platforms and volleyball and basketball courts. They are also announced that the one-hectare property which serves as the former home of ABC/TV5 in Novaliches, Quezon City (currently in use by the weekly OPM countdown show Vibe) will be putting up on sale and the proceeds of the auction will go for the construction of the additional phases.

== Features ==
The TV5 Media Center is composed of one 9-storey corporate building and two 8-storey buildings which house six ultramodern TV studios used by the programs of TV5 and One Sports as well as Cignal-exclusive channels (One News, One PH, One Sports+ and PBA Rush), particularly Studio 4 currently uses for Eat Bulaga!, Studio 5 for news programs, Studio 6 for Face to Face with Ate Koring, radio booths for 105.9 True FM post-production facilities, newsroom and staff offices of News5, TV5 Entertainment and Sports5, voice-over room and office spaces. The 5th floor serves as the main office of Cignal TV and management, and talent development agency Star Worx.
