= One Sports (TV channel) =

Philippine free-to-air sports television network

- Logo used since March 8, 2020
- Type: Free-to-air television network
- Country: Philippines
- Stations: List of One Sports stations
- Headquarters: TV5 Media Center, Reliance cor. Sheridan Sts., Mandaluyong, Metro Manila, Philippines

Programming
- Languages: English (main); Filipino (secondary)
- Picture format: 720p/1080i HDTV (downscaled to 16:9 480i for the SDTV feed)

Ownership
- Owner: Nation Broadcasting Corporation (MediaQuest Holdings, Inc.)
- Parent: TV5 Network, Inc.
- Key people: Manuel V. Pangilinan (Chairman, TV5 Network and NBC); Victorico P. Vargas (President and CEO, TV5 Network); Raul Dela Cruz (General Manager, Nation Broadcasting Corporation); Engr. Erwin V. Galang (Head, Regulatory and Industry Relations, NBC); Engr. Edward Benedict V. Galang (Network Engineering Operations, NBC)
- Sister channels: TV5; RPTV; Kapatid Channel; AksyonTV International; PBA Rush

History
- Founded: March 8, 2020; 6 years ago
- Launched: March 8, 2020; 6 years ago
- Replaced: RPTV (UHF 29 Cagayan de Oro channel space)
- Replaced by: RPTV (UHF 29 Cebu, Cagayan de Oro and Davao channel space)
- Former names: MTV Philippines (2001–07); AksyonTV (2011–19); 5 Plus (2019–20)

Links
- Webcast: Live Streaming (Philippine users only)
- Website: onesports.ph

Availability

Terrestrial
- Analog UHF: Listings may vary
- Digital UHF: Listings may vary
- Sulit TV: Channel 3
- Sky Cable: Channel 59 (Mega Manila); Channel 13 (Regional)
- Converge Vision / SkyTV (Metro Manila): Channel 41
- Sky Direct (Nationwide): Channel 11
- Cignal TV (Nationwide): Channel 6 (SD); Channel 258 (HD)
- SatLite (Nationwide): Channel 6
- G Sat (Nationwide): Channel 37
- Cablelink (Metro Manila, Cavite, Laguna, Bulacan, Tarlac): Channel 16

Streaming media
- Cignal Play: Available on the Cignal Play website or via mobile application

One Sports (stylized in all lowercase) is a Philippine commercial free-to-air television network. It is currently broadcast in analog on DWNB UHF TV Channel 41 in Metro Manila and various other relay and affiliate stations across the country. It is also available as a digital television subchannel in selected areas. Its broadcast schedule runs from 5:00 AM to 12:00 AM, Monday through Saturday, and from 6:00 AM to 1:00 AM on Sundays. It may operate a reduced schedule during the Paschal Triduum or 24/7 during important sporting events (most notably, the 2024 Summer Olympics).

One Sports is owned by the Nation Broadcasting Corporation (NBC), and is jointly operated by NBC and TV5 Network, Inc., both subsidiaries of MediaQuest Holdings, Inc., the media arm of PLDT Beneficial Trust Fund. One Sports is the second MediaQuest channel launched under the One branding (presently known as the One Network Media Group), along with the English-language news channel One News, Filipino-language news/talk channel One PH, lifestyle portal One Life, and now-defunct premium entertainment channel One Screen.

== History ==
One Sports was originally known as 5 Plus, a dedicated sports channel which was launched on January 13, 2019, replacing the news channel AksyonTV.

On March 8, 2020, One Sports was launched as a free-to-air television channel by Cignal TV (which owns the said brand on its own cable channel) and TV5, with TV5 Network's sports division having adopted the same branding coinciding with the start of the 2020 PBA season. From March 30 to June 14, 2020, the terrestrial network temporarily suspended its broadcast due to the COVID-19 pandemic and the enforcement of the enhanced community quarantine in Luzon.

Following the closure of ABS-CBN Sports after 70 congressmen denied ABS-CBN Corporation's new franchise, One Sports replaced certain programming – such as the NFL, the NCAA (US) and Philippine Super Liga – with some sports whose rights were previously held by ABS-CBN Sports – such as the NBA, ONE Championship, UAAP, and Premier Volleyball League.

On February 1, 2024, One Sports ceased its affiliation in Cebu and Davao and was replaced by sister channel RPTV, which serves as an UHF relay of RPN-owned TV stations.

=== Transition to high-definition (2024) ===
On January 22, 2024, One Sports began broadcasting in the anamorphic 16:9 aspect ratio. This change allowed for a widescreen presentation that was intended for viewers with compatible widescreen televisions. Around two months later, on March 14, Cignal TV announced that the channel, along with its sister channel RPTV, would be available in high-definition; the HD channel feed was launched the following day.

== Programming ==
One Sports programming includes extreme sports, collegiate sports, e-sports, sports entertainment, and other sports-related content. The network may take on the responsibility of airing sports programs displaced from TV5 and RPTV by breaking news or other special programming. A selection of One Sports sports coverage is available online through their official website and various social media platforms.

== Availability ==
One Sports is seen via analog free-to-air television on Channel 41 in Metro Manila and 4 regional stations nationwide. Aside from One Sports main analog signal, it is a must-carry channel on all cable and satellite TV providers. The network is also available as a digital subchannel through TV5's main digital TV channels in selected areas in the Philippines.

Callsign	Channel	Type	TX Site
DWNB	41	Originating	Antipolo, Rizal
DZYB	36	Relay	Tuba, Benguet
DXDE (Note: Owned by TV5 Network, Inc.)	29	Relay	Zamboanga City
DXCO	29	Relay	Cagayan de Oro
PA	22	Relay	General Santos

== One Sports+ ==
One Sports+
- Logo used since March 8, 2020
- Type: Pay television channel
- Country: Philippines
- Broadcast area: Nationwide
- Network: TV5; One Sports; RPTV
- Affiliates: One Sports (a sports division of TV5)
- Headquarters: TV5 Media Center, Reliance cor. Sheridan Sts., Mandaluyong, Metro Manila, Philippines

Programming
- Languages: English (main); Filipino (secondary)
- Picture format: 720p/1080i HDTV (downscaled to 16:9 480i for the SDTV feed)

Ownership
- Owner: Cignal TV (MediaQuest Holdings)
- Sister channels: One PH; One News; Kapatid Channel; PBA Rush; NBA TV Philippines; UAAP Varsity Channel; True TV

History
- Launched: January 9, 2019 (as original counterpart of One Sports); March 8, 2020; 6 years ago (as One Sports+)
- Former names: Hyper (2012–2019); One Sports (original counterpart) (2019–2020)

Links
- Website: cignal.tv/one-sports onesports.ph

Availability

Terrestrial
- Cignal TV (Nationwide): Channel 91 (SD); Channel 261 (HD)
- SatLite (Nationwide): Channel 54

Streaming media
- Cignal Play: Available on the Cignal Play website or via mobile application

One Sports+ is a Philippine pay TV channel owned by Cignal TV. It is the cable/satellite counterpart of the main One Sports channel. Unlike its terrestrial network counterpart, the channel broadcasts sports-related programs and live sporting events 24 hours a day, all year round.

The original One Sports channel was launched on January 9, 2019, on satellite provider Cignal, replacing Hyper. On March 8, 2020, following the launch of the One Sports brand on free-to-air television, the original One Sports channel on Cignal was rebranded as One Sports+, making it the fourth One-branded channel.

=== One Sports+ current programming ===
- Premier Volleyball League
- Spikers' Turf
- NBA (only games that not aired live by ESPN-Disney+ and Prime Video)
- Starting Lineup
- LVBP
- Caribbean Series
- One Championship (exc. PPV events)
- PXC MMA
- Sharks Billiards Association
- Matchroom Pool events
- WPA World Ten-ball Championship
- Women's World 10 ball Championship
- Korean Basketball League
- Japanese B.League
- German Basketball Bundesliga
- Superliga Profesional de Baloncesto
- FIFA Futsal Women's World Cup
- FIFA World Cup
- FIBA World Cup

=== Previous programming ===
- 2026 AFC Women's Asian Cup
- Philippine Super Liga
- Maharlika Pilipinas Basketball League
- WWE SmackDown
- WWE Bottom Line
- Cage Warriors
- PGA Tour
- Copa Paulino Alcantara
- Premier Boxing Champions (including Showtime fights)
- Golden Boy Boxing
- Billie Jean King Cup
- The Game
- CONMEBOL
- Glory Kickboxing
- LPGA
- 2019 William Jones Cup
- FIBA Americup
- East Asia Super League
- EuroLeague
- Top Rank Boxing

== See also ==
- TV5
- RPTV
- One PH
- 105.9 True FM
- One Sports (sports division)
- PBA Rush
- 5 Plus (defunct channel)
- AKTV (defunct channel)
- Hyper (defunct channel)
- Nation Broadcasting Corporation
- List of analog television stations in the Philippines
- Media of the Philippines
