= Jun Sabayton =

Filipino actor, comedian, host, and director (born 1973)

- Born: Rodolfo Adaptar Sabayton Jr. November 23, 1973 (age 52); Cebu City, Philippines
- Other name: Bayaw
- Education: Communications and Broadcasting
- Alma mater: Mowelfund Film Institute
- Occupations: actor, comedian, host, director

Rodolfo "Jun" Adaptar Sabayton Jr. (born November 23, 1973) is a Filipino actor, comedian, host, and director. He is known as "Bayaw” due to his works with Lourd de Veyra at News5's History with Lourd, Wasak, Word of the Lourd, Kontrabando, B.A.Y.A.W. for president advocacy campaign.

Jun Sabayton was born on November 23, 1973, in Cebu City. Jun's television debut was in the 2002 show Strangebrew. He was a producer and a special participant in the show, working alongside his co-stars Ramon Bautista, Angel "Erning" Rivero, and the late Tado Jimenez.

Sabayton has also acted in movies. He was a host on TV5 and then moved to ABS-CBN, in around 2018. He was also a host of comedy science program You Have Been Warned Asia broadcast on the Discovery Channel.

== Filmography ==
=== Film ===
- 2026: 2 Valid IDs
- 2026: Youngblood
- 2025: Samahan ng mga Makasalanan
- 2025: Ang Pagbabalik ni Max Buwaya (short film)
- 2025: Muli Na Ka, Merlie (short film)
- 2021: Historya ni Ha
- 2021: Ang Fraile
- 2019: Pandanggo Sa Hukay
- 2018: Goyo: Ang Batang Heneral
- 2018: Kusina Kings
- 2017: Balangiga: Howling Wilderness
- 2017: Dormitoryo: Mga Walang Katapusang Kuwarto
- 2016: My Candidate
- 2015: Ilustrado Problems (short film)
- 2014: Kubot The Aswang Chronicles 2
- 2014: Mumbai Love
- 2013: Blue Bustamante
- 2012: Ang Mga Kidnapper ni Ronnie Lazaro
- 2011: Rakenrol
- 2006: Wag kang lilingon
- 2006: Imahe Nasyon
- 2005: Sa Ilalim ng Cogon
- 2003: Keka
- 2002: Piso Dalawang Piso (short film)

=== Television ===
- 2022: Jose & Maria's Bonggang Villa
- 2022: Happy Together
- 2022: My Papa Pi
- 2022: Lakwatsika
- 2021: Wag Po!
- 2021: Chika Besh
- 2021: Daddy's Gurl
- 2021: Sing Galing
- 2021: Unang Hirit
- 2020: Kaibigan
- 2020: LOL: Lunch Out Loud
- 2020: All Out Sundays
- 2020: Mars Pa More
- 2020: Pepito Manaloto
- 2019: Wagas
- 2019: Dear Uge
- 2019: Bubble Gang
- 2019: Tadhana
- 2018: Karelasyon
- 2018: Wish Ko Lang
- 2018: Funny Ka, Pare Ko
- 2018: Home Sweetie Home
- 2018: Banana Sundae
- 2017: You Have Been Warned Asia
- 2017: It's Showtime
- 2017: Eat Bulaga
- 2017: Trops
- 2017: Aksyon Sa Umaga
- 2016: My Candidate
- 2016: Barangay Utakan
- 2016: Demolition Job
- 2016: Funny Ka, Pare Ko
- 2015-2016: News5 Kontrabando
- 2015: Wattpad Presents
- 2015: Tanod (TV Series)
- 2015: Mac and Chiz
- 2015: Sapul Sa 5
- 2015: Sunday PinaSaya
- 2014: Party Pilipinas
- 2013-2016: History with Lourd
- 2013: Aksyon Primetime Balita
- 2013: Cassandra: Warrior Angel
- 2011-2013: Wasak
- 2010: Baikinggu
- 2009: Baywalk
- 2008: Shall We Dance?
- 2007: SOP: Sobrang Okay Pare
- 2006-2012: Wow Mali
- 2005: Maynila
- 2005: Bubble Gang
- 2005: Wowowee
- 2004: Magpakailanman
- 2004: MTB: Ang Saya Saya
- 2003: ASAP Natin To!
- 2003: Maalaala Mo Kaya
- 2002: Strangebrew
