= Strangebrew =

- Created by: R.A. Rivera
- Developed by: Furball Entertainment
- Directed by: R.A. Rivera
- Starring: Arvin Jimenez; Angel Rivero
- Opening theme: Macho Gwapito by Rico J. Puno
- Country of origin: Philippines

Production
- Camera setup: Single-camera setup
- Running time: 30 minutes

Original release
- Network: UNTV
- Release: 2001 – 2003
- Network: Studio 23
- Release: April 13, 2004 – 2004

Strangebrew is a Philippine television situational comedy and reality show broadcast by UNTV, NBN and Studio 23. Directed by R.A. Rivera, it stars Tado and Angel Rivero, it aired on UNTV from 2001 to 2003. The show moved to Studio 23 from April 13, 2004 to 2004.

== History and concept ==
Strangebrew was launched in early summer of 2001 on UNTV. It was hosted by Arvin "Tado" Jimenez, and Angel "Erning" Rivero. The show was directed by R.A. Rivera. The show also featured film makers Ramon Bautista and Jun Sabayton, playing odd characters. The reality comedy show features fun facts about how things are made in a factory, or making a movie. Trivial pursuits and road trip like episodes were produced, as means to make a transition from one topic to another. Some episodes cover two or more topics about everyday ordinary things and people. Some include interviews of a plumber, a toll gate operator, MRT/LRT operator/employees, theater ticket attendees, motion picture deliverymen, the late Raymundo Punongbayan of PHIVOLCS, when Tado and Erning featured Taal Volcano. The known celebrities to make guest appearances were Odette Khan and Julia Clarete. Khan, a veteran television and film actress, played Tado's mother in one episode, while Julia Clarete played "Erning" on a couple of episodes, one of which featured Tado on a date with a mestiza in Manila Zoo.

Notable among the episodes are the catchphrases such as "rakenrol", often said by Tado and "Tama" (correct) being mentioned by Erning whenever Tado says something but in a naivete way. The show usually starts with the opening billboard being shown with the intro of "Macho Gwapito", popularized by Rico J. Puno, being played repeatedly.

== Cast ==
Tado was freelance actor/film maker before landing the lead role. He appeared in some independent short films as a lead character or a supporting/minor role in mainstream Pinoy cinema and television. He made several appearances on Parokya ni Edgar music videos doing odd characters.

Angel "Erning" Rivero went on to become a host on Studio 23's Breakfast.

Ramon "Monra" Bautista portrayed various characters, a fairy, a mermaid, a film director, a fake plumber, an alien/robot and even played Erning at the end of sci-fi episode narrative with a feature on the COD mannequins in between.

Jun Sabayton portrayed Bautista's cohort in most of the episodes, a mermaid's aid, an assistant director/stuntman, a police officer, an alien/robot and the like.

R.A. Rivera produced/directed various film/video projects for local musicians such as Radio Active Sago Project and Pedicab in which he is a non-musical band member. He directed "Astro" for Radioactive Sago Project, in which he was awarded Best Music Video on MTV Pilipinas.

Julia Clarete also appeared as Erning in two episodes, the feature on Manila Zoo and the local drag racing scene in Parañaque City, respectively.

=== Episode locations ===
- Lucban, Quezon Province
- Los Baños, Laguna
- Marikina Shoe Expo, Cubao, Quezon City
- AMSPEC Factory, Muntinlupa
- Sampaguita Studios Museum, Quezon City
- Manila Memorial Park, Parañaque City
- SM Megamall, Mandaluyong
- Ayala Center, Makati City
- Corregidor
- Trece Martirez City, Cavite
- Philippine General Hospital
- Taal, Batangas
- Philippine National Railways

=== Other appearances of hosts ===
- Angel Rivero, a.k.a., "Erning" was a former Breakfast Host on Studio 23 where she also wears the Mao Zedong hat that she wears on Strangebrew.
- Tado was a former cast member of a former sitcom of ABS-CBN's Ok Fine Whatever, children's programme Art Jam (with Jeffrey Quizon) and the noontime show MTB.
- Ramon, Angel and Tado have a radio show called The BrewRATs! (Ramon, Angel and Tado Show) which had aired on FM stations 99.5 RT and U92. Its current incarnation, on the internet radio station Dig Radio, runs every Thursday from 9 PM to midnight.

== Post-Strangebrew ==
After the cancellation of the reality sitcom show, the hosts appeared in various TV shows and radio programs:

Angel "Erning" Rivero is still active on TV, and recently hosted the radio comedy show The Brewrats on U92 (now 92.3 Radyo5 True FM), and also formerly hosted the daily morning show Breakfast on Studio 23 (now defunct).

Ramon Bautista* is also active hosting both TV and radio shows, and is also a movie actor. He recently starred with Dingdong Dantes in the movie Tiktik: The Aswang Chronicles, which was released in 2012 by GMA Films. He is also the author of the bestselling book, Bakit Hindi Ka Crush Na Crush Mo?, which was made into a major motion picture comedy by Star Cinema in 2013. He is currently one of the hosts of the online news satire program "Kontrabando" and Barangay Utakan, which airs on TV5.

Tado Jimenez guested on various movies and TV shows, and operated his own toys and hobbies store LimiTADO. He was one of fourteen passengers killed in a bus accident on the morning of February 7, 2014, in Benguet Province.

Jun Sabayton* became a comedian and host of Wasak, "History with Lourd", and Word of the Lourd on AksyonTV (now One Sports), Aksyon sa Umaga on TV5 with Radioactive Sago Project Band frontman and TV5 broadcaster/host Lourd De Veyra. Sabayton appeared in the indie movie RAKenROL with Glaiza de Castro, Diether Ocampo, and Jason Abalos in 2012. Sabayton is currently one of the hosts of the online news satire program "Kontrabando" and Barangay Utakan which airs on TV5.

R.A. Rivera* is now a movie director and still directs various indie movies. He is currently one of the hosts of the online news satire program "Kontrabando".

Julia Clarete became a host for the longest running daily variety noontime show, Eat Bulaga!, on GMA 7. She is currently based in Kuala Lumpur, Malaysia, with her son and her husband.

Bautista, Sabayton, and Rivera are currently anchors of the online, satire-based and profanity-laced newscast, "Kontrabando" with Lourd de Veyra, which is currently being broadcast through their Facebook page.

== See also ==
- List of programs broadcast by UNTV
- List of programs broadcast by People's Television Network
- List of programs broadcast by Studio 23
- List of Philippine television shows
