= Angel Rivero =

Filipino actress, host and DJ

- Occupations: Actress, disc jockey, TV host
- Known for: Erning in Strangebrew

Angel Rivero is a Filipino actress, host and DJ. She is best known for her role in the show Strangebrew as Erning, the bodyguard/driver of Tado.

In 2017, Rivero was host of comedy science program You Have Been Warned Asia together with Lourd de Veyra, Ramon Bautista, Jun Sabayton, and R.A. Rivera aired on Discovery Channel across Southeast Asia.
