= Rowan Hamilton =

Canadian hammer thrower (born 2000)

Personal information
- Born: January 29, 2000 (age 26) Chilliwack, British Columbia
- Education: University of British Columbia
- Height: 6 ft 2 in (188 cm)

Sport
- Country: Canada
- Sport: Track and field
- Event: Hammer throw
- University team: UBC Thunderbirds (2019–2023); California Golden Bears (2024–present)
- Club: Kajaks Track and Field Club

Achievements and titles
- Personal bests: Hammer throw: 77.78 m (Paris 2024); Weight throw: 22.36 m (Seattle 2024)
Medal record
Men's track and field
Representing Canada
Commonwealth Games
Bronze medal – third place	2026 Glasgow	Hammer throw
NACAC Championships
Bronze medal – third place	2022 Freeport	Hammer throw
Pan American U20 Championships
Gold medal – first place	2019 San José	Hammer throw

Rowan Hamilton (born January 29, 2000) is a Canadian athlete who competes in the Hammer throw. He has represented Canada at the 2022 and 2023 World Athletics Championships and holds a personal best of 77.78m, set in 2024.

== Athletics career ==
=== High School ===
==== 2017 ====
In 2017, representing Sardis Secondary School, he finished runner up at the BC High School Championships in both the Discus throw and Hammer throw.

At the Canadian U20 Championships in Ottawa, Hamilton finished 2nd in the hammer throw, throwing a personal best of 62.37 m and earning the opportunity to represent Canada at the 2017 Pan American U20 Athletics Championships in Trujillo, Peru. Making his international debut in Peru, he finished 7th, with his best throwing standing at 61.77 m.

In August, he competed at the Canadian U18 Championships in Brandon, Manitoba, winning gold in the hammer and earned a bronze medal in the discus.

==== 2018 ====
The following year, he improved upon his 2017 performances at the BC High School Championships in the hammer and discus throws, taking first in both events. At the Canadian U20 Championships, he matched his performance from the previous year, once again taking second.

=== University of British Columbia ===
After graduating from Sardis Secondary in 2018, Hamilton enrolled at the University of British Columbia to compete for the UBC Thunderbirds track and field.

==== 2019 ====
In his first season as a Thunderbird, Hamilton won the Cascade Conference and NAIA titles in the hammer throw, setting a personal best of 63.50 m at the NAIA Championships in Gulf Shores, Alabama.

In July, he competed at the Pan American U20 Championships in Costa Rica, where he took first place, throwing a 6 kg hammer personal best of 75.35 m. That same month, he took first at the Canadian U20 Championships with a throw of 66.43 m.

==== 2022 ====
On 6 May, Hamilton threw a personal best of 75.88 m to win the Oregon Twilight. Later that month at the 2022 NAIA Championships, Hamilton's first since 2019, he defended his hammer title with a mark of 74.21 m. In Langley, British Columbia, at the 2022 Canadian Track and Field Championships, Hamilton earned a bronze medal despite throwing of just 67.91 m, his shortest performance of the year up to that point.

Hamilton qualified to compete at the 2022 World Athletics Championships in Eugene, Oregon. Making his world championship debut, he failed to advance from the qualifying round, posting a best throw of 74.02 m. Just a few weeks later, he competed at the Commonwealth Games in Birmingham, placing 9th with a throw of 67.76 m. He ended his year by competing at the NACAC Championships in Freeport, Bahamas. There he earned a bronze medal, just edging out fellow Canadian Adam Keenan for a spot on the podium by just 12 centimeters with a throw of 74.36 m to Keenan's 74.24 m.

==== 2023 ====
On 24 May 2023, Hamilton defended his NAIA title in Marion, Indiana with a throw of 71.97 m. His next competition came a month later in Rathdrum, Idaho where he managed a personal best of 76.80 m. At the Canadian Championships, he threw a mark of 72.81 m, placing second to Ethan Katzberg.

At the 2023 World Athletics Championships in Budapest, Hungary, Hamilton once again failed to advance from the qualifying round, his furthest throw reaching 74.14 m.

=== University of California, Berkeley ===
==== 2024 ====
With one year of college athletic eligibility remaining, Hamilton decided to enroll at the University of California, Berkeley to compete for the California Golden Bears.

In his Bear debut and his first ever indoor meet at the Don Kirby Invitational in Albuquerque, New Mexico, he broke the Cal school record in the weight throw with a mark of 21.98 m, shattering the previous mark by over 2 metres. Two weeks later he improved upon that mark with a throw of 22.36 in Seattle. That performance qualified him for the 2024 NCAA Division I Indoor Track and Field Championships in Boston, becoming the first Cal male thrower to do so. At the championship, he placed 12th with a throw of 21.52 m, earning All-American honours.

== Personal life ==
Hamilton married Chloe Alkema on September 30, 2023 in a ceremony in Chilliwack, BC.

== Competition record ==
Representing Canada
Year	Competition	Venue	Position	Event	Result
2017	2017 Pan American U20 Athletics Championships	Trujillo, Peru	7th	Hammer throw (6 kg)	61.77 m
2019	2019 Pan American U20 Athletics Championships	San José, Costa Rica	1st	Hammer throw (6 kg)	75.35 m
2022	2022 World Athletics Championships	Eugene, Oregon	17th	Hammer throw	74.02 m
2022	2022 Commonwealth Games	Birmingham, United Kingdom	9th	Hammer throw	67.76 m
2022	2022 NACAC Championships	Freeport, Bahamas	3rd	Hammer throw	74.36 m
2023	2023 World Athletics Championships	Budapest, Hungary	13th	Hammer throw	74.14 m
2026	2026 Commonwealth Games	Glasgow, Scotland	3rd	Hammer throw	75.36 m
