= Barry Neufeld =

Former school trustee

- Born: Barnabas Lynn Neufeld
- Education: BA, Adolescent Psychology, 1978
- Alma mater: Simon Fraser University
- Known for: Controversial former school trustee
- Website: barryneufeld.academia.edu

Barry Neufeld is a former school trustee from Chilliwack, BC. Neufeld was first elected in December 1993 and held office until December 2008. He was elected again in December 2011 and held office until October 2022. Neufeld has been criticized for making bigoted and discriminatory remarks towards the LGBTQ+ community, and in May 2020, he was accused of disparaging the Chief Public Health Officer of Canada, Dr. Theresa Tam.

Neufeld made headlines in 2017 for comparing gender transitioning to child abuse. His comments attracted widespread media attention, a court filing by the Canadian Union of Public Employees, and a vocal exchange with political and human rights defender Morgane Oger. The superintendent of School District 33 Chilliwack, Evelyn Novak, responded saying Neufeld did not speak for the Board on that issue.

The Chilliwack School Teachers Association passed a vote of non-confidence in 2017. The Chilliwack Board of Education passed a motion asking Neufeld to resign and the Ministry of Education issued a statement.

In 2019, Neufeld's defamation lawsuit against British Columbia Teachers' Federation (BCTF) president Glen Hansman was dismissed in British Columbia’s first use of Strategic lawsuit against public participation ("anti-SLAPP") legislation. His appeal to the Supreme Court of Canada was dismissed in May 2023.

Neufeld has complained other trustees treated him "like a dirty old man".

Neufeld lost his bid for re-election in October 2022.

In 2022, Neufeld was sued by school trustee Carin Bondar who alleged that Neufeld defamed her when he called her a “striptease artist.” The comment was in reference to an educational video starring Bondar that parodied the Miley Cyrus music video, Wrecking Ball. Neufeld defended himself on the basis that Dr. Bondar had willingly entered an ideologically charged political arena that is well-known for ‘use of intemperate, offensive or harsh language aimed at discrediting one’s opponent'. Neufeld applied to have the case dismissed under the BC Protection of Public Participation Act, but this application was dismissed. Then, in April 2024, a B.C. Supreme Court judge ordered Barry Neufeld to pay Bondar $45,000 in defamation damages. Then, in 2025, Neufeld's appeal of this judgment to the BC Court of Appeal was dismissed.

In 2026 the B.C. Human Rights Tribunal ordered Neufeld to pay $750,000 to the Chilliwack Teachers' Association "in compensation to teachers' association members who identify as LGBTQ between October 2017 through 2022 for injury to their dignity, feelings and self-respect." The Tribunal also issued a statement that Neufeld had purposely violated their rules and orders during their deliberation proceedings.
