= Tado (comedian) =

Filipino actor and comedian (1974–2014)

- Tado in 2009
- Born: March 24, 1974; Baybay, Leyte, Philippines
- Died: February 7, 2014 (aged 39); Bontoc, Mountain Province, Philippines
- Resting place: Loyola Memorial Park Marikina, Philippines
- Education: Polytechnic University of the Philippines (BS)
- Occupations: Comedian, actor, author
- Political party: Sanlakas; Partido Lakas ng Masa
- Spouse: Lei Jimenez

Comedy career
- Medium: Stand-up, television, radio, internet
- Genres: Satire/political satire/news satire, observational comedy
- Subjects: Mass media/news media/media criticism, Philippines politics, human sexuality, self-deprecation

Arvin Impuesto Jimenez (March 24, 1974 – February 7, 2014), known mononymously as Tado, was a Filipino comedian, actor, radio personality, businessman, published author and activist. His nickname "Tado" comes from a Tagalog expletive (tarantado) that he frequently blurts out. Tado was primarily known for the offbeat television program Strangebrew and the U92 radio program The BrewRATs!.

== Early life and career ==
Prior to fame, Tado had worked on various odd jobs such as a staff in a mental hospital, a waiter, a scriptwriter for television and a photojournalist. Tado graduated from the Polytechnic University of the Philippines (PUP) with a degree in Psychology. He was an active member of Scouts Royale Brotherhood (SRB), Beta Tau chapter. He was engaged in social issues as a student organizer of Sanlakas.

While in PUP, Tado was influenced by his artist friends, causing him to be involved in theater, painting and photography. This led to the founding of the now-defunct PUP-based cultural organization called PANDAY PIRA (Pandayan ng Pilipinong Kultura). He eventually studied film making at the Mowelfund Institute.

Tado later co-founded Dakila ("Noble"), an artists group aiming to instill modern-day heroism in everyday people, with poet and journalist Lourd de Veyra, Parokya ni Edgar bassist Buwi Meneses and acclaimed actor Ronnie C. Lazaro.

Tado also dabbled in music and had appeared once as the lead vocalist of The Youth as with original vocalist Dodong Cruz's consent. He and the band appeared on the GMA Network program Unang Hirit, singing the band's hit "Multong Bakla" ("gay ghost").

== Showbiz career ==
=== Strangebrew ===
Tado became involved in television with the premiere of the off-the-wall magazine show Strangebrew in the then-NU 107 operated UNTV Channel 37, with Angel Rivero as his co-host, in 2001. His maroon Volkswagen Beetle took him and Rivero throughout Metro Manila on an adventure with "a unique cartoony look, a caustic wit" with "a weird sense of humor."

Strangebrew and Tado became a cult hit until the show was canceled a year later, with him enshrined as a pop culture icon.

In almost all episodes whenever they interview a certain person, Tado throws his famous question "Kuya/ate, sa tagal mo nang ginagawa itong trabaho na ito, umibig ka na ba?" ("Sir/ma'am, with all the time that you have given for this job, have you tried falling in love?")

=== The BrewRATs! ===
He was reunited with Rivero (along with occasional Strangebrew contributor, Ramon Bautista) in Hit 99.5 FM's (now 99.5 Play FM) late-night talk show The BrewRATs! in which is a pun on the Tagalog slang of the male genitalia. Even with Hit FM's reformatting to 99.5 Campus FM and finally reverting to its old 99.5 RT callsign, the show was consistently placed on the station's roster of shows, and consistently occupying the late-night slot until it was moved to the morning slot from August to September 2009.

On October 1, 2009, The BrewRATs! resurfaced on U92, the radio affiliate of MTV Philippines, of which Bautista was a personality of The Ramon Bautista Show. It went off the air a second time as a result of U92's reformat to Radyo5 92.3 News FM and has since become a show at the internet radio station DigRadio every Thursday from 9 PM to midnight.

== Other ventures ==
=== LimiTado ===
Aside from radio, Tado also designed LimiTado ("Limited"), and ran it with his wife, Lei Jimenez. The graphic T-shirts' main selling points are striking messages printed on the shirt and spoofs. Other items include bags, accessories and toy collectibles such as Volkswagen die-casts. He also has a tattoo shop and a production company.

== Political life and activism ==
Tado ran for the position of city councilor of Marikina's 1st City Council District (coextensive with Marikina's 1st congressional district) in 2010 as an independent candidate. He finished eleventh; the first eight in the tally were elected.

Tado was involved in protest actions of the Sanlakas political bloc such as the campaign against rising electricity rates, and demonstrations against Charter Change. He also supported the picket protest of the workers of Philippine Airlines. He was also seen visiting Sulu Sultan Jamalul Kiram III, expressing his support in the Sulu Sultanate's claim over Sabah, North Borneo. He also joined the demonstration against the Priority Development Assistance Fund, known as Pork barrel.

Tado ran again for the position of city councilor of Marikina's 1st District in 2013 as a candidate under Partido Lakas ng Masa. This would be the second time he lost in the election, finishing at eleventh yet again.

== Death ==
Tado died on February 7, 2014, in an accident when a GV Florida Transport bus fell off a road in Sitio Paggang, Talubin, Bontoc, Mountain Province in the Philippines. In total, 14 people were killed and more than 32 people were injured. He was cremated and inurned in Loyola Memorial Park in Marikina City, Philippines.

== Selected filmography ==
=== Television ===
- Pangako Sa 'Yo as Jason (2000)
- Strangebrew as himself (2001–2002)
- Bituin as King (2002)
- Klasmeyts (2002)
- Masayang Tanghali Bayan as himself (Host) (2003–2004)
- Ok Fine Whatever (2003)
- MTB: Ang Saya Saya (2004–2005)
- Art Jam as host (2005)
- Laugh To Laugh: Ang Kulit (2005)
- Project 11 (2006)
- Baywalk (2006)
- Camera Cafe Philippine Edition as himself (2007–2008)
- Palos (2008)
- The Weekend News With Ramon Bautista (2009) as himself/guest
- Pinoy Big Brother as himself (2009)
- Stoplight TV (2009)
- Maynila (2010)
- Showtime as himself (Judge) (2010)
- Eat Bulaga! as Himself/Guest (2010)
- 30w POwhz! as Himself (2010)
- Happy Yipee Yehey! as Himself (2011)
- Wasak as Himself (2013)
- Pepito Manaloto as Joel (2013)
- One Day Isang Araw presents "John Tamad" (2013)
- Aha! as himself (2013–2014) His last TV appearance
- My Puhunan as himself on his business LimiTADO (2014, aired posthumously)
- Day Off as himself (2014, aired posthumously)

=== Film ===
- Radio (2001)
- Trip (2001)
- Hesus, Rebolusyunaryo (2002)
- Utang Ni Tatang (2002)
- First Time (2003)
- Astigmatism (2004)
- Dilim (2005)
- Boso (2005)
- D' Anothers (2005) as Atty. Reposo
- Coup Betat (2006)
- M.O.N.A.Y (Misteyks obda neyson adres Yata) ni Mr. Shooli (2007)
- Scaregivers (2008)
- 69 1/2 (2009)
- Ang Beerhouse (2009)
- Captive (2012)
- PakantoTADO (2012)
- Dyagwar: Havey O Waley (2012)
- Call Center Girl (2013)
- My Little Bossings (2013)

=== Music videos ===
- "Nerbyoso" by Rivermaya (cameo)
- "Harana" by Parokya ni Edgar (cameo)
- "Picha Pie" by Parokya Ni Edgar
- "Inuman Na" By Parokya Ni Edgar (special participation)
- "Swimming Beach" by Parokya Ni Edgar
- "Boy Kulot" by Rocksteddy
- "Ang Parokya" by Parokya Ni Edgar (stock footage)
- "Magkabilang Mundo" by Jireh Lim (love triangle with Donnalyn Bartolome)
- "Maquilit" by Q-York Feat. Sponge Cola (posthumous released video)
