= You Have Been Warned =

You Have Been Warned may refer to:

- You Have Been Warned, a TV series also known as Outrageous Acts of Science
- You Have Been Warned – A Complete Guide to the Road, a 1935 book by Fougasse (cartoonist)
