= Food Detectives =

- Food Detectives Logo
- Starring: Ted Allen, Adam Ruben
- Country of origin: United States
- No. of episodes: 23

Original release
- Network: Food Network and Cooking Channel
- Release: July 29 – September 20, 2008

Food Detectives is a food science show hosted by Ted Allen that aired in North America on Food Network from July to September 2008. Ted Allen, backed by research conducted by Popular Science magazine, investigated food-related beliefs, such as the validity of the five-second rule or the effectiveness of ginger in relieving motion sickness. In addition to support from scientists such as molecular biologist Dr. Adam Ruben and Popular Science staff members, Allen was assisted on-screen by a group of "food techs," often-silent assistants who were the participants in simple experiments exploring food-related myths, beliefs, practices, and folkways.

Food Detectives has 23 episodes. Allen said the series was "MythBusters meets Good Eats meets [Watch] Mr. Wizard." Filming for the show's inaugural episode took place in Little Italy, Baltimore.

== Reception ==
Melissa Camacho of Common Sense Media had a positive review of the show, writing, "The show's unique combination of food science, pop culture, and experimentation creates an amusing formula that offers entertaining but teachable moments for both kids and adults. Granted, watching food techs slice, dice, eat, run, spin, and even sleep in the name of science may not sound very interesting, but Allen's quick wit adds flavor to what could be considered bland technical conversations. Kids and adults who are interested in science and/or cooking will certainly find this show appealing. Trivia buffs will also be engaged."

The New York Times's Mike Hale penned a negative review of the show, stating, "With Mr. Allen straining to add some levity, Food Detectives will live and die by the questions it asks. In the premiere last week, it hit one for four. A test of what cools down your mouth after eating spicy food was interesting. (Bread and dairy products help; soda and beer only make things worse.) But the other three segments were thuddingly unsurprising. ... Those who complain that the Food Network's best days are in the not-too-recent past you know who you are, and you're blogging right this second will only feel more disillusioned after watching Food Detectives."

== See also ==
- Brainiac: Science Abuse
- Good Eats
- MythBusters
