= Snake City =

- Genre: Wildlife documentary/Travel documentary/Family
- Starring: Simon Keys; Siouxsie Gillett
- Music by: Stereo MC's
- Countries of origin: South Africa
- Original language: English
- No. of seasons: 9
- No. of episodes: 53

Production
- Running time: 45 minutes
- Production company: Earth-Touch Productions

Original release
- Network: National Geographic Channel (regular series)
- Release: November 7, 2014

Snakes In The City (also known as Snake City) is a wildlife documentary television series that stars snake-catchers Simon Keys and his partner, Siouxsie Gillett. Aired on the National Geographic Channel, the show takes place in Durban, South Africa and has become valued for the series' entertainment and educational perspective on catching and releasing life-threatening snakes such as cobras, pythons and black mambas. The series features music by the Stereo MCs. Season 9 (2023) is shot in Mysore, India.

== Presenters ==
Gillett has a herpetology degree and zoo background while Keys has worked with snakes all of his life. The first season of Snake City featured Simon Keys’ ex-wife, Nadine Keys.

In the past, Keys and Gillett also worked at a snake sanctuary in Dunstable, Bedfordshire. Gillett has an allergy to the venom of the Mozambique spitting cobra that can elevate the potency of a bite.

Record temperatures and storms in South Africa have brought about an abundance of snakes in urban areas. In Summer months, they receive close to one hundred calls a week.

== Series overview ==
Season	Episodes	Originally released	
Season	Episodes	First released	Last released
1	3	November 7, 2014	November 21, 2014
2	6	October 16, 2015	November 20, 2015
3	6	January 17, 2017	February 17, 2017
4	10	July 30, 2017	October 1, 2017
5	6	September 14, 2018	October 19, 2018
6	6	October 2, 2019	November 6, 2019
7	6	February 23, 2021	March 29, 2021
8	6	July 6, 2022	August 10, 2022
9	6	September 6, 2023	October 11, 2023

== Episodes ==
=== Season 1 (2014) ===
No. overall	No. in season	Title	Original release date
1	1	"Python Ambush"	November 7, 2014
2	2	"Spitting Mad Cobra"	November 14, 2014
3	3	"Attack of the Black Mambas"	November 21, 2014

=== Season 2 (2015) ===
No. overall	No. in season	Title	Original release date
4	1	"Mamba in My Closet!"	October 16, 2015
5	2	"Panic in the Streets"	October 23, 2015
6	3	"Ghost Snake"	November 30, 2015
7	4	"Bed of Snakes"	November 6, 2015
8	5	"Snakes on a Train"	November 13, 2015
9	6	"Into the Snake Pit"	November 20, 2015

=== Season 3 (2017) ===
No. overall	No. in season	Title	Original release date
10	1	"DeadCatch/Snakes in the city"	January 13, 2017
11	2	"Recipe for Disaster"	January 20, 2017
12	3	"Cobra in the Kitchen"	January 27, 2017
13	4	"Hiss of Death"	February 3, 2017
14	5	"Country Club Killer"	February 10, 2017
15	6–7	"The Cape Crusaders"	February 17, 2017

=== Season 4 (2017) ===
No. overall	No. in season	Title	Original release date
16	1	"The Wedding Crasher"	July 30, 2017
17	2	"Psycho Mamba"	August 6, 2017
18	3	"Trailer Park Terror"	August 13, 2017
19	4	"Monster Under the Bed"	August 20, 2017
20	5	"Twice Bitten"	August 27, 2017
21	6	"Slithering Heights"	September 3, 2017
22	7	"Say Your Prayers"	September 10, 2017
23	8	"Office Nightmare"	September 17, 2017
24	9	"Mamba Hotline"	September 24, 2017
25	10	"Venomous Encounters"	October 1, 2017

=== Season 5 (2018) ===
No. overall	No. in season	Title	Original release date
26	1	"Storm of Snakes"	September 14, 2018
27	2	"Hot & Bothered"	September 21, 2018
28	3	"Mamba Mama"	September 28, 2018
29	4	"Tunnel of Doom"	October 5, 2018
30	5	"Humungosoar"	October 12, 2018
31	6	"Hiss in the Night"	October 19, 2018

=== Season 6 (2019) ===
No. overall	No. in season	Title	Original release date
32	1	"Divide and Conquer"	October 2, 2019
33	2	"There's a Snake in the Fridge!"	October 9, 2019
34	3	"Snakes and Sewage"	October 16, 2019
35	4	"The Dark Night"	October 23, 2019
36	5	"Kindergarten Terror"	October 30, 2019
37	6	"Housing Estate Horror"	November 6, 2019

=== Season 7 (2021) ===
No. overall	No. in season	Title	Original release date
38	1	"Python Party"	January 25, 2021
39	2	"Cobra Wedding Crashers"	February 1, 2021
40	3	"Mamba Mayhem"	February 8, 2021
40	4	"Black Mamba Summer"	February 15, 2021
41	5	"The Snake Pit"	March 22, 2021
42	6	"Big Mamma Mamba"	March 29, 2021

=== Season 8 (2022) ===
No. overall	No. in season	Title	Original release date
43	1	"New Blood"	July 6, 2022
44	2	"Ten Foot Mamba"	July 13, 2022
45	3	"Cobras to Crocs"	July 20, 2022
46	4	"Mamba Nightmare"	July 27, 2022
47	5	"Mamba Madness"	August 3, 2022
48	6	"The Last Bite"	August 10, 2022

=== Season 9 (2023) ===
No. overall	No. in season	Title	Original release date
49	1	"Snakes & Ladders"	September 6, 2023
50	2	"Mamba Invasion"	September 13, 2023
51	3	"Cobra Chaos"	September 20, 2023
46	4	"Monster Python"	September 27, 2023
52	5	"Killer Krait"	October 4, 2023
53	6	"Cobra Dive"	October 11, 2023
