= Aaron Flagg =

Canada international rugby union player

- Born: June 16, 1989 (age 37) New Zealand
- Height: 6 ft 2 in (188 cm)
- Weight: 244 lb (111 kg)
- School: Sardis Secondary School

Rugby union career
- Position: Lock
International career
| Years | Team | Apps | (Points) |
| 2013 | Canada | 1 | (0) |

Aaron Flagg (born June 16, 1989) is a Canadian former rugby union player.

Born in New Zealand, Flagg moved to Chilliwack, British Columbia at the age of 12, where he attended Sardis Secondary School. He is a product of Abbotsford RFC and was a forward, best suited to the second row.

Flagg made a capped appearances for Canada in the 2013 Pacific Nations Cup, coming on as a second half replacement in the match against Japan in Nagoya. The following year, Flagg was an unused substitute in Canada's final 2015 World Cup qualifier against the United States, which they won to secure a tournament berth.

In 2015, Flagg was signed by Moseley, a second-tier English club.

== See also ==
- List of Canada national rugby union players
