= Watson Elementary School =

Watson Elementary School can refer to the following schools:

- Watson Elementary School (Arkansas), in Little Rock
- Watson Elementary School (British Columbia), in Chilliwack
