= Throw (band) =

Filipino hardcore punk band

THROW

Background information
- Genres: Punk rock, hardcore punk
- Years active: 2000–2017; 2019–present
- Label: Throw Music (independent)
- Members: Al Dimalanta; Dennis Maniego; Alan Roldan; Spyk Maniego
- Past members: Ojie Arcega; Bimboi San Pedro; Albert Ascona
- Website: throwmusic.tumblr.com

Throw is a four-piece hardcore punk band from the Philippines.

== History ==
The band was formed by Al Dimalanta (the leader and co-founder of the 1980s Philippine punk band Dead Ends) in the year 2000 with Dennis Maniego on bass, Ojie Arcega on drums and Bimboi San Pedro on guitar. This is generally considered the official start of the band despite earlier attempts by Al to form a band with the same name. Throw went on to record its first independently produced album one year later (2001), a self-titled hardcore release (THROW) that marked the official return of Dimalanta to the local punk scene.

Sometime in 2006, Ojie Arcega and Bimboi San Pedro left the Philippines to work in Singapore. This left Al and Dennis without a drummer and guitar player. The late Luis Guiang of Put3Ska fame played the drums for Throw while the band looked for permanent replacements. With Al Dimalanta doing both the vocal and guitar chores like he did with Dead Ends, Throw played as a power trio for a few gigs.

Sometime in 2007, Throw officially reformed with Al Dimalanta on guitar and vocals, Dennis on bass, Albert Ascona on second guitar and Spyk Maniego (Al's nephew) on drums. This was to be the second generation of Throw. The band then came out with their second album entitled Unwavering, which was released in 2008.

In early 2010, Throw came out with their third independently produced album entitled Believe. The album went on to be hailed as one of the best albums of 2010 by Uno Magazine and the Philippine Star. Similarly, the title cut Believe was hailed by the same magazine as one of the best songs of the decade (2000-2010).

Throw came out with an extended play (EP) release entitled Wag Kalimutan ang Ingay in October 2010 with Alan Roldan handling the second guitar chores (Roldan replaced Ascona who went on a self-imposed, although short-lived, hiatus from the local underground music scene). The EP also went on to be hailed as one of the best releases of the year by FHM Magazine, Uno Magazine and Philippine Star.

Four years after the band's last release, Throw came out with their fourth independently produced album titled Stand, a 23-song opus with over an hour's worth of hardcore punk music. The album received early positive reviews from music websites and is considered one of the best underground releases for 2014.

In 2017, Dimalanta had withdrawn from the Philippine punk scene due to his perceived distress in the local punk community, effectively disbanding Throw. After around two years, the band reportedly resumed playing gigs.

== Band members ==
=== From 2001-2007 ===
- Al Dimalanta - vocals
- Dennis Maniego - bass
- Bimboi San Pedro - guitars
- Ojie Arcega - drums

=== From 2008-2010 ===
- Al Dimalanta - guitar and vocals
- Dennis Maniego - bass
- Albert Ascona - guitar
- Spyk Maniego - drums

=== From 2011-present ===
- Al Dimalanta - guitar and vocals
- Dennis Maniego - bass
- Alan Roldan - guitar
- Spyk Maniego - drums

== Discography ==
- Throw (2001)
- Unwavering (2008)
- Believe (2010)
- Wag Kalimutan ang Ingay - EP (2010)
- Stand (2014)
