= Carin Bondar =

Canadian biologist (born 1975)

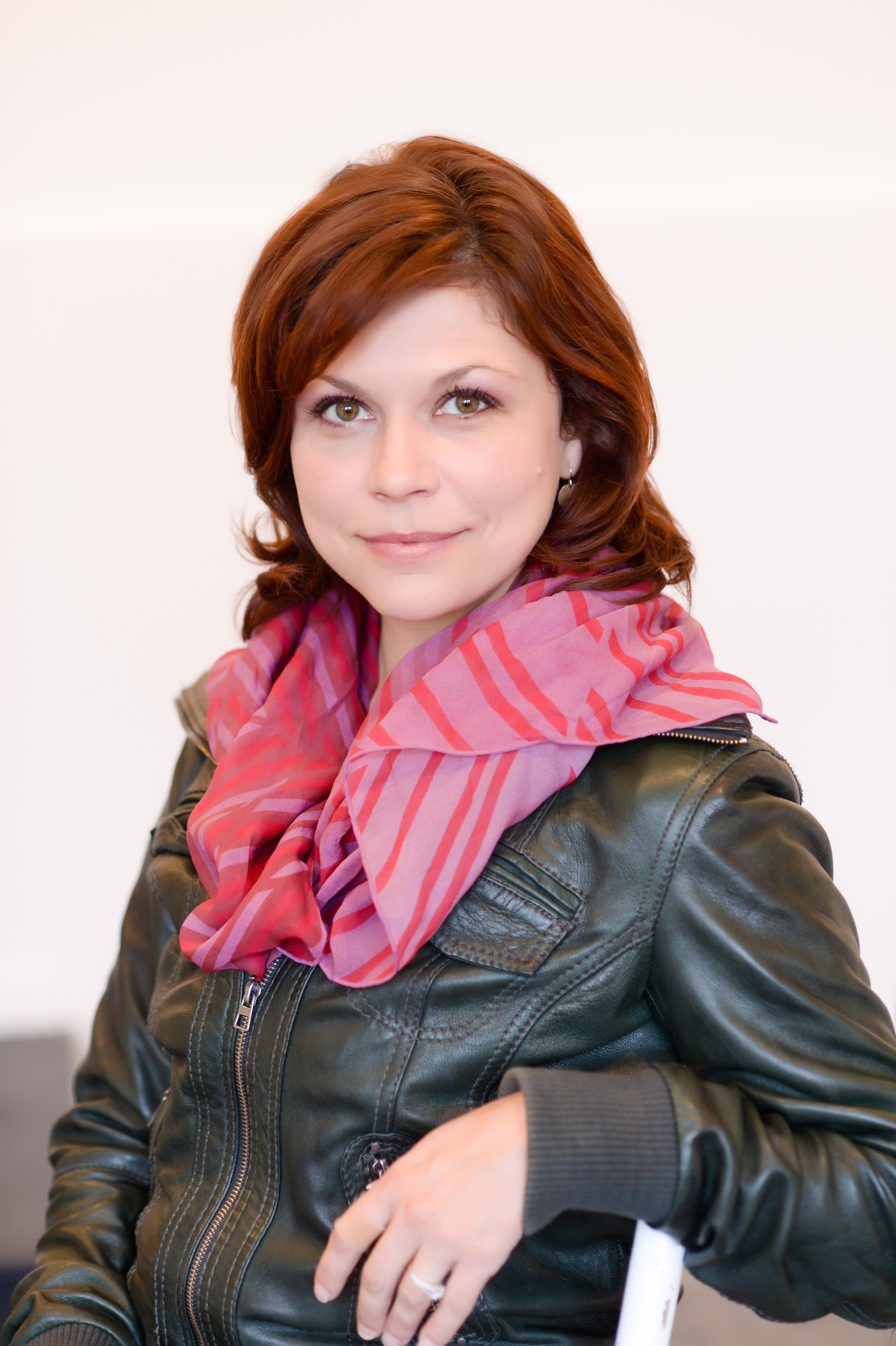
- Born: 20 May 1975 (age 51); New Westminster, British Columbia
- Education: BSc - Simon Fraser University; MSc - University of Victoria; PhD - University of British Columbia
- Occupations: Academic; School trustee; Science writer; T.V. host; Writer
- Notable work: Wild Moms; Wild Sex
- Television: Outrageous Acts of Science (2012-2018)
- Spouse: Ian Affleck (m. 2001; div. 2017)
- Children: 4
- Scientific career
- Known for: discovered 7 new species of beetles and snails
- Fields: Biology
- Workplaces: University of the Fraser Valley
- Doctoral advisor: John Richardson
- Website: www.carinbondar.com

Carin Bondar (born 20 May 1975) is a Canadian biologist, writer, filmmaker, speaker and television personality. She is a host of Outrageous Acts of Science, Stephen Hawking's Brave New World, and Worlds Oddest Animal Couples.

== Personal life ==
Bondar was born in New Westminster and grew up near Vancouver, British Columbia. She comes from a small family of French-Canadian, Russian and British ancestry. She met mathematician Ian Affleck in 1995, became engaged in 1999 and married in 2001.

After receiving a BSc from Simon Fraser University in 1999, she completed an MSc in evolution and development at the University of Victoria in 2001 and a PhD in freshwater population ecology from the University of British Columbia. Bondar was forced to put her PhD studies on hold in 2005 while she took over a family business after the deaths of her father John Paul and her brother William Paul. She re-enrolled after a year's leave and completed her PhD in 2007.

== Career ==
Bondar began a career in science communication while raising her four young children in Chilliwack, British Columbia. Her first book, The Nature of Human Nature and her own personal biology blog led her to a blogging position with Scientific American in 2011. She was invited to appear in the Science Channel's Outrageous Acts of Science in its first season, and she has maintained a hosting position on this TV show for all of its 6 seasons.

Bondar has since written two more books and written/hosted several web and television programs on major networks. She has worked with The Science Channel, Discovery Channel, Animal Planet, Netflix and National Geographic Wild. Her independent web series Wild Sex (produced by Earth Touch, a South African based natural history film production company), has engaged over 60 million viewers. She presented on this topic at TED Global in Edinburgh, Scotland in 2013 – "The Birds and the Bees are just the Beginning".

Bondar is currently a writer and host of Wild Sex, an animated series based on her book of the same title. She also wrote a book called Wild Moms, published in 2018. Bondar holds an adjunct professorship in the department of biology at the University of the Fraser Valley in British Columbia, and works with Taxon Expeditions, a Netherlands-based company that engages citizen scientists on scientific expeditions to discover new species. The group mainly works in the Sabah region of Borneo and has discovered seven new species.

Bondar is known for her bold approach to science storytelling. She has received accolades and global media-coverage for her music video parodies including a play on Miley Cyrus' "Wrecking Ball." She has appeared in several live events including I F*#cking Love Science Live, the Australian National Science Week, and the Bay Area Science Festival.

Bondar was elected to the Board of Education for the Chilliwack School District in 2022.

== Books ==
- The Nature of Human Nature : Lulu Press
- The Nature of Sex: The Ins and Outs of Mating in the Animal Kingdom (Orion, UK)
- Wild Sex (Pegasus, United States)
- Wild Moms (Pegasus, United States)

== Television series ==
Year	Title	Credits
2012–18	Outrageous Acts of Science	Science Channel, TV series, Cast
2013	Brave New World with Stephen Hawking	Discovery Canada, Discovery World HD, National Geographic, presenter
2013	Bad Ass Animals	National Geographic Wild
2013	World's Weirdest Farms and World's Weirdest Body Parts	National Geographic Wild
2015	Daily Planet	Discovery Canada
2016	The World's Oddest Animal Couples	Netflix Canada, TV series, Cast
2017	Mother Nature is Trying to Kill You	Discovery Canada
2020	Strange Evidence	Science Channel

== Web series ==
Year	Title	Credits
2013	Wild Sex	Earth Touch Online
2015	Adventures in Biology	Carin Bondar YouTube
2015	DNews	Discovery Digital Networks
2015	Sex Bytes	Carin Bondar YouTube
2017	Wild Moms (forthcoming)	Seeker (Group 9 Media)
2017	Wild Sex	Seeker (Group 9 Media)

== Awards and recognition ==
Year	Award
2003	Timberwest Fellowship for Graduate Studies at UBC
2007	Gunter and Cordula Paetzold fellowship for high academic standing during PhD
2011	Grand Prize in the Discovery World HD Film Snacks competition for outreach film 'Why did the toad cross the road'
2016	Canadian Journal of Zoologists Public Outreach award
