= G.W. Graham Secondary School =

Location
- 45955 Thomas Rd. Chilliwack, British Columbia, V2R 0B5; Canada; 49.1073°N 121.953°W

Information
- School type: Public, high school
- School board: School District 33 Chilliwack
- Principal: Brian Fehlauer
- Grades: 9-12
- Language: English
- Colours: Blue, silver, and white
- Team name: Grizzlies
- Website: gwg.sd33.bc.ca

G.W. Graham Secondary School, previously G.W. Graham Middle-Secondary School, is a high school for students from grade 9 (age 14–15) to grade 12 (age 17–18) in Chilliwack, British Columbia. It is part of School District 33 Chilliwack.

Prior to the school district reorganization in 2018 this was constituted as a combined middle secondary school taking pupils from grade 7 (age 12–13).

In 2018, the school district proposed a reorganization. An expansion plan for the school was announced in 2020.
