= Bakit Hindi Ka Crush ng Crush Mo? =

- Theatrical movie poster
- Directed by: Bb. Joyce A. Bernal
- Written by: Irene Emma Villamor
- Based on: Bakit Hindi Ka Crush ng Crush Mo? by Ramon Bautista
- Produced by: Marizel Samson-Martinez (supervising)
- Starring: Kim Chiu; Xian Lim
- Cinematography: Dan Villegas
- Edited by: Joyce A. Bernal; Beng Bandong; Glenn Ituriaga
- Music by: Carmina Cuya
- Production company: Star Cinema
- Distributed by: ABS-CBN Film Productions
- Release date: July 31, 2013
- Country: Philippines
- Language: Filipino
- Box office: ₱102,368,727.00 (Domestic)

Bakit Hindi Ka Crush ng Crush Mo? (lit. 'Why does your crush not have a crush on you?') is a 2013 Filipino romantic comedy film directed and co-edited by Joyce Bernal from a screenplay by her assistant director Irene Emma Villamor. Starring Kim Chiu and Xian Lim in their first film as a love team, it is an adaptation of comedian Ramon Bautista's self-help book of the same name. It tells the story of a brainy ugly duckling girl and her journey as she turns into someone who's worth loving. Bautista also stars in the film as a taxi driver.

Produced by Star Cinema as part of its 20th anniversary presentation, it was released in theaters on July 31, 2013.

== Synopsis ==
Sandy Veloso (Kim Chiu) is a modern-day ugly duckling who is obsessed with her boyfriend Edgardo (Kean Cipriano). After he breaks with her, Sandy is left to ponder why she feels unwanted.

Matters turn worse for Sandy when she is laid off by her company, under the leadership of its new bachelor CEO, Alex Prieto (Xian Lim). Realizing his mistake when employees belatedly put in a good word for Sandy, Alex hires her back, and the two start forming an unlikely friendship.

In a love story about "the ugly duckling in all of us and how we turn into someone worth loving", Alex at one point offers Sandy a make-over so she will no longer cry over a failed relationship.

== Cast ==
- Kim Chiu as Sandy Veloso
- Xian Lim as Francisco Alejandro "Alex" Prieto
- Mylene Dizon as Pamela
- Freddie Webb as Don Antonio Prieto
- Ramon Bautista as himself / taxi driver
- Kean Cipriano as Edgardo "Gardo" Salazar
- EJ Jallorina as Max Veloso
- Cholo Barretto as Nathan
- Jojit Lorenzo as Julius
- Marnie Lapus as Maricel
- Cheska Iñigo as Patty Prieto
- Cecil Paz as CWL
- Dianne Medina as pretty girl employee
- Sarah Gaugler as Liza
- Tonton Gutierrez as Miguel Prieto
- Angeline Quinto as Tangerine
- Pokwang as Cora Veloso
- Garlic Garcia as Orange
- Bianca Valerio as herself
- Jasmine Maierhoffer as Laura
- Dave Tolentino as punk employee
- Josie Galvez as HR head
- Carlo Cannu as Jancy
- Janlee Dungca as Fancy
- Dawn Jimenez as bar pretty girl
- Annika Gonzalez as Nina
- Jose Sarasola as Neil
- Elisse Joson as Isa
- Maricor Canlas as CWL
- Carmen Del Rosario as CWL
- Carmen dela Cruz as CWL
- Milagros Nacudini as CWL
- Lilia Cuntapay as CWL
- Gina Villa as CWL
- Raphael Robles as Alex's cousin
- Bret Jackson as Alex's cousin
- Paulo Nicko Ang as Alex's cousin
- Rommel Galido as Alex's cousin
- Connie Virtucio as Alex's aunt
- Ann Rose Blas as Alex's aunt
- Alora Mae Sasam as maid
- Nicco Manalo as reporter
- Javier Chan as Mang Andres
- Erika Marie Dionisio as Pamela's assistant
- Jireh Lim as himself
- RC Delos Reyes as office employee

== Production ==
Under director Joyce Bernal, screenwriter Irene Emma Villamor served as assistant director while Antoinette Jadaone served as script continuity supervisor.

== Promotion ==
Actors Kim Chiu and Xian Lim became guests to several ABS-CBN TV shows to promote the film. Among these are Gandang Gabi Vice and Banana Split.

=== Theme song ===
"Bakit Hindi Ka Crush ng Crush Mo?"

Single by Zia Quizon

from the album A Little Bit Of Lovin'
- Released: July 17, 2013
- Genre: Pop
- Length: 4:11
- Label: Star Records; PolyEast
- Songwriter: Jungeee Marcelo

"Bakit Hindi Ka Crush ng Crush Mo?", sung by Zia Quizon and written by Jungee Marcelo, serves as the theme song of the film. It was first released on July 8, 2013 on the FM radio station MOR 101.9 For Life! and was released as a single on July 17. It is also included in her second studio album, A Little Bit of Lovin'.

=== Music video ===
The music video for the song was released on ABSstarcinema's YouTube channel on July 23, 2013. The video's plot features Quizon at a photo shoot session while being pursued by a man who works on set, played by Ramon Bautista, the author of the book to which the film is primarily based.

=== Accolades ===
The song won at the 27th Awit Awards for the Awit Award for Best Song Written for Movie/TV/Stage Play on December 12, 2014.

== Release ==
=== Box office ===
The film was a box office success, earning 10.5 million php on its first day. Both local and international screenings had to be extended due to high demand. Domestically, the film grossed ₱180 million (not including international gross). After three weeks of its theatrical run, the film grossed over 100 million php. During its run, the film drew more audiences than several American films: Despicable Me 2, Percy Jackson: Sea of Monsters and The Wolverine.

=== Critical reception ===
Bakit Hindi Ka Crush ng Crush Mo? mostly received positive reviews from critics. Jerald uy of Uy.com stated that "Bakit Hindi Ka Crush ng Crush Mo? reminds us of the stupid things we can do for love but offers it in a fresh way." The movie was given an 8.5/10 rating from both moviegoers and movie critics alike.
