= Chilliwack Secondary School =

Chilliwack Secondary

Location
- 46363 Yale Rd; Chilliwack, Fraser Valley, British Columbia, V2P 2P8; Canada; 49.17661°N 121.94282°W

Information
- School type: Public, high school
- Motto: Ad Summum Nitamur ("We Strive for the Highest")
- Founded: 1903
- School board: School District 33 Chilliwack
- Superintendent: Rohan Arul-Pragasam (2004-)
- School number: 3333012
- Principal: Chuck Lawson
- Grades: 9-12
- Enrollment: 1,620 (December 2025)
- Language: Primarily English (Japanese, French, and Spanish classes are offered.)
- Hours in school day: 6.4 hours
- Area: Chilliwack
- Colours: Royal blue, gold
- Mascot: The Storm Trooper
- Team name: Storm
- Website: css.sd33.bc.ca
- Last updated: December 17, 2025

Chilliwack Secondary is a public high school in Chilliwack, British Columbia, Canada. It is part of School District 33 Chilliwack.

== History ==
Chilliwack Secondary School was founded on August 24, 1903, under the name, "Chilliwack High School". The school moved to its present site in 1950. It is finished with construction converting it to a hybrid high school and community centre. The project was completed in 2013.

In September 2024, Chilliwack Secondary was reportedly put on lockdown due to a local disturbance in the community. As of December 2025, there have been no updates regarding the situation, only speculations on what it could've been.

During the 2025-2026 school year, it was reported that Chilliwack Secondary School was 135% (400 students) over the 1,200-student capacity.

== Alumni ==
- Allan Fotheringham, satirical journalist
- Patrick Gallagher, actor
- Lewis MacKenzie, retired Canadian major-general, author and media commentator
- Jack McGaw, broadcast journalist
- George Pedersen, past president of five Canadian Universities
- Bria Skonberg, musician
- Diana Swain, CBC anchorperson
- Homer Thompson, classical scholar
- Tasha Tilberg, fashion model
