= Al Dimalanta =

- Birth name: Alfred Martin Alcantara Dimalanta
- Born: Manila, Philippines
- Genres: Punk rock, hardcore punk
- Occupation(s): Musician, QA manager, columnist, writer, professor, marketing communicator, visual artist, freelance PR consultant
- Instrument(s): Electric guitar, acoustic guitar, vocals, bass, drums, piano
- Years active: 1985-present
- Labels: Twisted Red Cross, Throw Music

Al Dimalanta (born Alfred Martin Alcantara Dimalanta) is a Filipino musician, writer, public relations practitioner, photographer, visual artist, and professor. He is best known as the leader, co-founder and chief songwriter of the Philippine punk band Dead Ends (1985-1996) and the leader and chief songwriter of punk-hardcore band Throw [2000–2019], considered one of the most important bands in the contemporary Philippine punk scene.

== Music ==
Al Dimalanta's musical career has spanned several decades, with his foray into punk rock, hardcore and acoustic rock music.

=== Dead Ends ===
Al and half-brother Jay Dimalanta formed Dead Ends in 1985 with drummer Rouen Pascual. The band came out with four independently produced underground punk albums from 1985 to 1995 as well as a fifth special edition greatest hits album in 2003. Dead Ends had several line-up changes but Al (on vocals and guitar) and Jay (on bass) remained as the band's core.

Dead Ends' albums, in chronological order, are Complaints (1986), Second Coming (1987), Damned Nation (1988), Mamatay sa Ingay (1995) and the greatest hits special edition album Chosen (2003) which was released in honor of Jay Dimalanta.

When Dead Ends disbanded following Jay's death in 1996, Al went into a four-year musical hiatus and focused on his marketing communications work and his stint at the academe in the University of Santo Tomas.

During those four years, Al tried putting up a band with Lourd de Veyra, who was a member of Dead Ends in the 1990s (only for the band's fourth album, Mamatay sa Ingay). The band was tentatively named Throw, although the band was rather short-lived on account of Al's and Lourd's respective jobs at the time and never even played beyond a few rehearsal sessions.

=== Throw ===
In 2000, Al Dimalanta reformed Throw as the band's vocalist and chief songwriter, with Dennis Maniego on bass, Ojie Arcega on drums and Bimboi San Pedro on guitar. This was to be the official start of Al's new hardcore punk band. Throw went on to record its first independently produced album one year later (2001), a self-titled hardcore release (THROW) that marked the official return of Dimalanta to the local punk scene.

Sometime in 2006, Ojie Arcega and Bimboi San Pedro left for Singapore to work in architectural firms. That left Al and Dennis without a drummer and guitar player. For a time, the late Luis Guiang of Put3Ska fame played the drums for Throw while the band looked for permanent replacements. With Al handling both the vocal and guitar chores, Throw then played as a power trio for a few gigs.

In 2007, Throw reformed with Al Dimalanta on guitar and vocals, Dennis Maniego on bass, Albert Ascona on second guitar and Spyk Maniego on drums. This was to be the 'second generation' of Throw. The band then came out with their second album entitled Unwavering which was released in July 2008.

Dimalanta and Throw came out with their third independently produced album entitled Believe two years later. The album went on to be hailed as one of the best albums of 2010 by Uno Magazine and the Philippine Star. Similarly, the title cut Believe was hailed by the same magazine as one of the best songs of the decade (2000-2010).

Throw came out with an extended play (EP) album entitled Wag Kalimutan ang Ingay in November 2010 with Alan Roldan handling the second guitar chores (Roldan replaced Ascona who went on a self-imposed, although short-lived, hiatus from the local underground music scene). The EP also went on to be hailed as one of the best releases of the year by FHM Magazine, Uno Magazine, Philippine Star, and Trash Radio Manila.

Four years after the band's last release, Al and Throw came out with their fourth album titled Stand, a 23-song opus with over an hour's worth of hardcore punk music. The album received early positive reviews from music websites.

Throw disbanded in April 2017 but reformed in 2018. The band is currently in hiatus following the departure of bass player Dennis Maniego.

=== As We Defy ===
In 2018, Al Dimalanta formed a project band called As We Defy, a thrash metal band with the same lineup of Throw (Alan, Spyk, and Dennis) and adding a new vocalist, Jason Papango, formerly of metal band Man Monster Machine.

As We Defy recorded a four-song EP called Forged in Defiance in 2018 and distributed it through digital channels. The band is also currently in hiatus following the departure of bass player Dennis.

== Marketing communicator and academician ==
From 1990 to 2002, Al worked as an officer and corporate communicator in Metrobank. His stint in Metrobank started in 1990 as a PR coordinator. He went on to become the head of the PR Section and the OIC of the Marketing Services Department. Dimalanta left Metrobank in 2002 to put up a small PR firm with some colleagues, called Vivid Communication.

Al Dimalanta also taught at the Faculty of Arts and Letters (AB) of the University of Santo Tomas from 1993 to 2008. During this time, he taught public relations, marketing, integrated marketing communication, advertising, feature writing and English. Dimalanta is credited to have spearheaded the public relations program in the university's AB Journalism course. It was upon his recommendation that public relations instruction was offered to journalism majors starting in 1993 (previously, public relations was only offered to Mass Communication/Communication Arts majors). His recommendation stemmed from the belief that a thorough knowledge of PR would help journalism graduates in their work as media practitioners, particularly when interacting with corporate communicators. He also believed that the subject would give journalism graduates added options in terms of post-college work. Public relations continues to be part of the Faculty's Journalism curriculum. Dimalanta left UST in 2008 to pursue a public relations project in Singapore. When Al came back to the country, he started doing freelance PR and editorial consultancy work.

While teaching in AB, Dimalanta concurrently served as the PR and Marketing Officer of the UST Center for Creative Writing and Studies (CCWS), from 2003 to 2007. He worked under the helm of his mother, then CCWS director (and later UST writer-in-residence) and renowned poet Ophelia Alcantara Dimalanta.

From February 2011 to December 2012, Al worked as the QA Manager in eServe, Inc., handling a team of content writers and social media managers. He left the firm to go to the US for several months. When he came back, he resumed his PR and editorial consultancy work. He is currently the Head of Content at GeiserMaclang Marketing Communications Inc., one of the leading PR and Marketing Communications firms in the Philippines today.

In 2016, Al briefly served as a radio host in The Punk Connection, a weekly two-hour punk rock and hardcore radio show aired every Saturday on Jam 88.3 FM.

== Photography and painting ==
Al Dimalanta is also known for his visual arts, particularly photography and painting. His digital photography work has been featured in several multi-artist exhibits and magazines. He also does lomography in his spare time. In his career as a semi-professional photographer, Al has come to be known for his figure studies and still life, as well as for his street photography work.

Although Al mainly uses a second-generation Canon digital SLR (Canon EOS D60) in his photography work, he has also used Canon film SLRs and Nikon DSLRs in his shots. In his lomography work, Al has used the following film cameras: Holga 135BC, Vivitar PN2011, and a SuperHeadz wide and slim plastic toy camera.

Al also dabbles in painting, particularly oil and acrylic painting. Although mostly for personal use, Al's paintings lean more towards still life, punk art, and contemporary landscapes.

== Writing career ==
As a writer, Al has dabbled in creative writing, journalism, and business writing. He has written short stories, flash fiction pieces, and poems which were published in leading publications (such as the Philippines Graphic) and UST journals. Most of his works remain unpublished, however, and can only be seen in Al's online blogs. Al plans to come up with a non-fiction book about his experience as a youngster during the Philippine punk scene of the '80s and the history of his two bands Dead Ends and Throw.

Al was also a columnist of Interaksyon, the online news portal of TV5, one of the leading broadcast networks in the Philippines. He has been writing for the news portal's Infotech section since 2011 and mostly writes about digital audio, digital photography, social media and SEO, and marketing communication. Al also works as the editorial consultant of graphic design companies and has written the annual reports of some big local companies.

== Discography ==
=== Dead Ends ===
- Complaints (1985)
- Second Coming (1986)
- Damned Nation (1987)
- Mamatay sa Ingay (1995)
- Chosen (Greatest Hits) (2003)

=== Throw ===
- Throw (2001)
- Unwavering (2008)
- Believe (2010)
- Wag Kalimutan ang Ingay (EP) (2010)
- Stand (2014)

=== As We Defy ===
- Forged in Defiance (EP) (2018)
