= Fraser Valley Distance Education School =

Fraser Valley Distance Education School (FVDES)
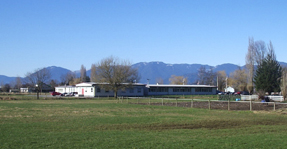

Location
- 46361 Yale Road East; Chilliwack, British Columbia, V2P 2P8; Canada; 49°10′35″N 121°56′33″W

Information
- School type: Public, Distributed Learning
- School board: School District 33 Chilliwack
- School number: 10133000
- Principal: S. Wicker
- Staff: 15
- Grades: K-12
- Enrollment: 4000 (7 December 2012)
- Website: fvdes.sd33.bc.ca
- Last updated: 17 April 2025

Fraser Valley Distance Education School (FVDES) is one of the largest distance education schools in British Columbia, Canada. It offers both online and paper-based distance learning from kindergarten to grade 12. FVDES's students include both school age and adult learners. Most live in the Lower Mainland of B.C., but a growing number live in other areas of the province or overseas. FVDES is a publicly funded school that follows the British Columbia school curriculum and offers full "Dogwood" certification upon graduation.

Founded in 1990, Fraser Valley Distance Education School is part of a provincial group of nine distance education schools located throughout British Columbia. These schools have their roots in traditional correspondence distance education but are rapidly undergoing change to provide online (or internet) course delivery.

FVDES currently has over 500 full-time online learners. The school also has around 3000 correspondence students who use predominantly paper-based correspondence materials, although many are starting to enroll in the new online course offerings. In addition, there are approximately 300 part-time online students. Two new areas of growth are adult learners and students who continue to attend regular "brick and mortar" schools.

FVDES's online and paper-based programs offer different features and different ways of learning. Online courses are more structured, and feature full-time teacher support and online instruction. They also have email access, virtual classrooms and discussion groups. Correspondence booklets (though not textbooks) have largely been phased out of the online courses. On the other hand, correspondence (paper-based) courses offer greater flexibility and a wide range of course options. Students may take some courses online and others by paper; students make their choice based on their personal needs. At the elementary level, optional portfolio-based assessment is a popular option.

To address the needs of online learners, the school has moved rapidly to incorporate online course offerings and is currently undergoing unprecedented growth. FVDES now offers a complete selection of the core academic courses, including Planning 10 and provincial exam courses like Math 12, History 12, and Biology 12. More elective courses are under development. FVDES is dedicated to offering individual teachers for each course, rather than providing non-specialist tutors. Over the past three years, the on-site staff has grown to twenty-five elementary, middle school and senior secondary teacher, plus five special needs teachers and four teaching assistants. Technical help has also grown from a single part-time technician to two full-time technicians. Other developments at FVDES include an expanded number of field trips (for example, swimming, skiing, geocaching, skating) and regularly scheduled art-based activities.
