= Chilliwack Central Elementary Community School =

Public school in British Columbia, Canada

Coordinates: 49.173979°N 121.953173°W

Chilliwack Central Elementary Community

Location
- 9435 Young Rd; Chilliwack, British Columbia, V2P 2P9; Canada

Information
- School type: Public, Elementary school
- Founded: 1929
- School board: School District 33 Chilliwack
- Superintendent: Rohan Arul
- School number: 3333008
- Principal: Jaimee Charlie
- Grades: K-5
- Enrollment: 260 (November 2014)
- Colours: Green and White
- Team name: Sockeyes

Chilliwack Central Elementary Community is a public elementary school in Chilliwack, British Columbia part of School District 33 Chilliwack.

== History ==
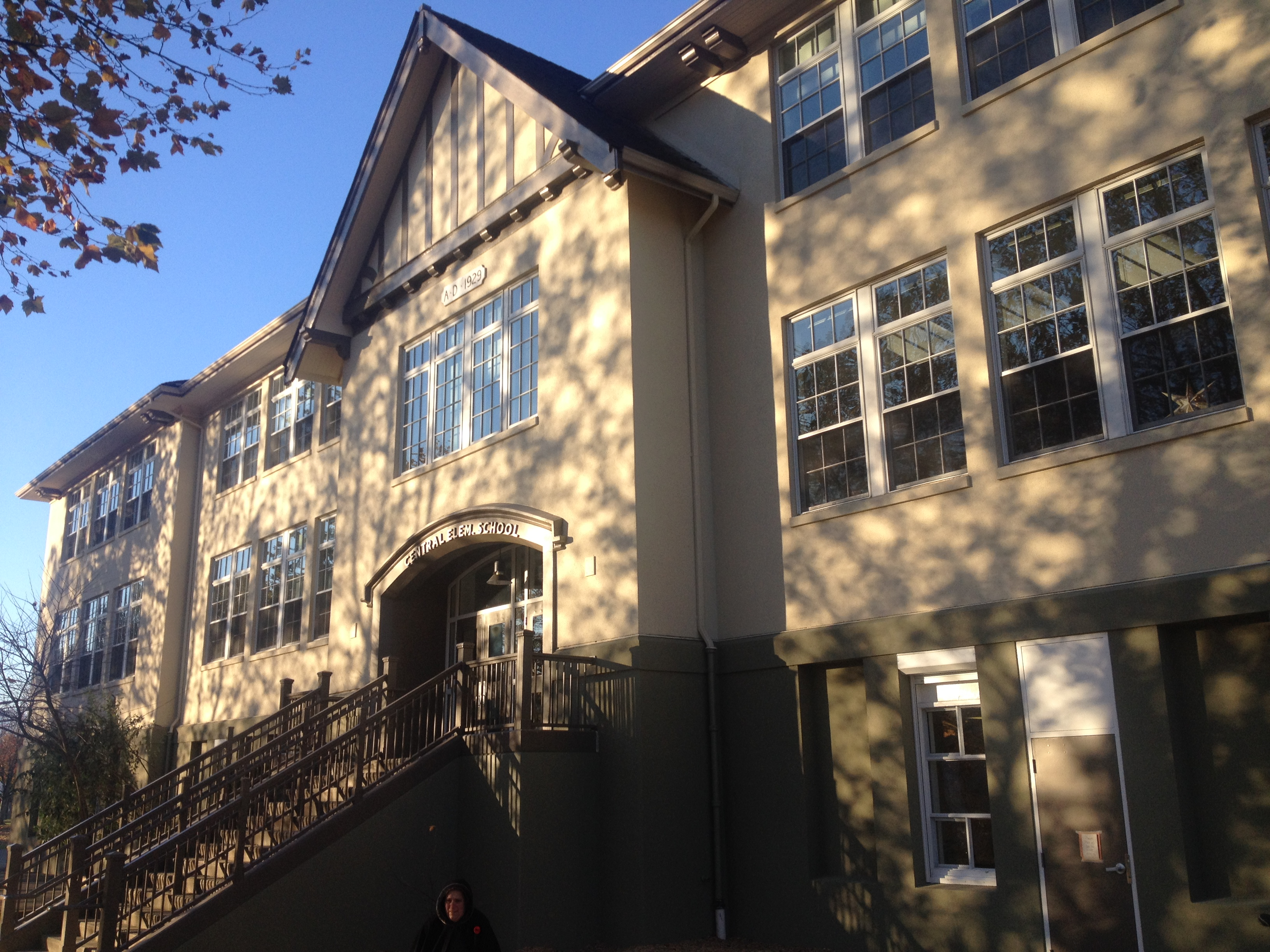
Central 2014

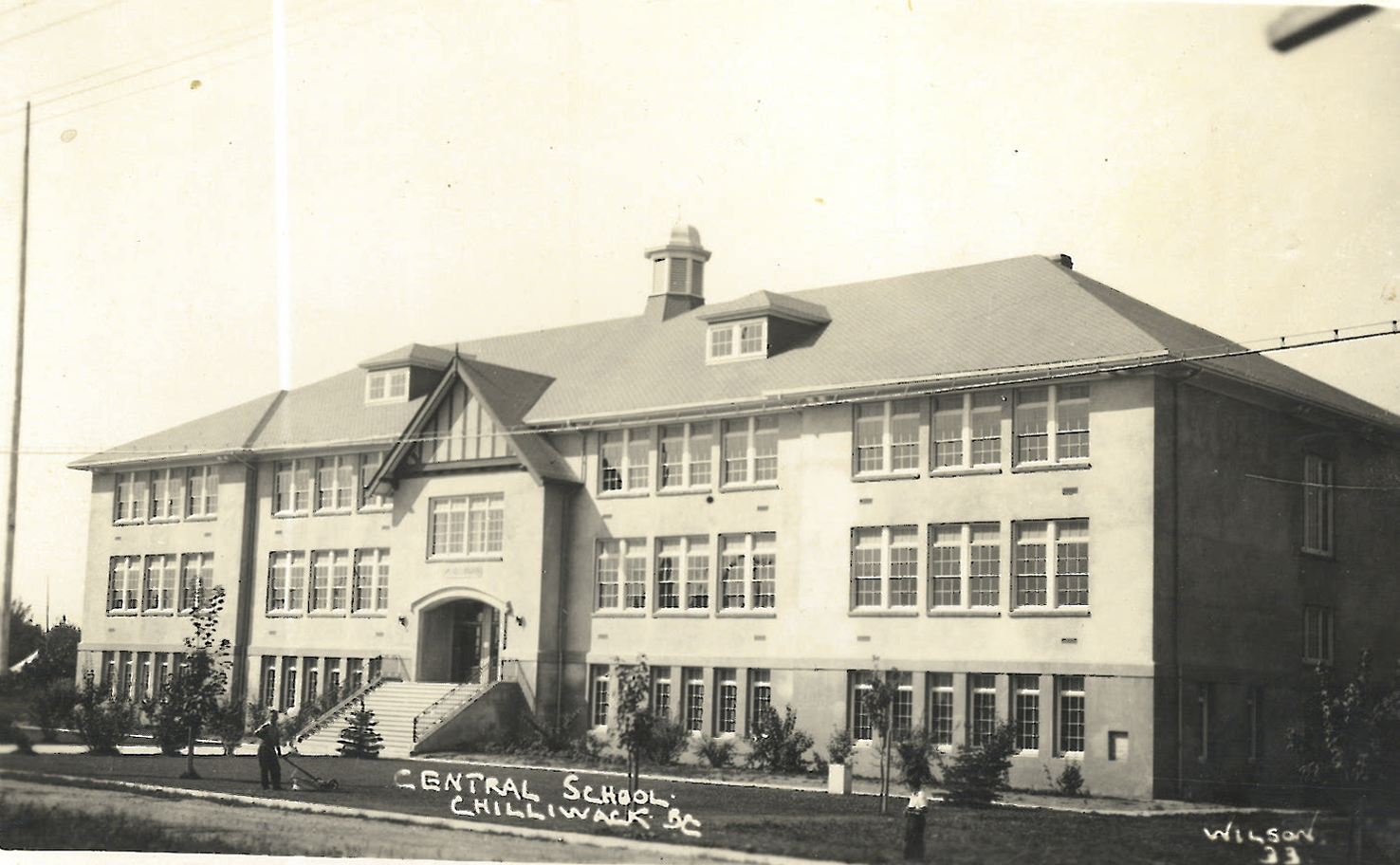
Central 1940s

Chilliwack Central is considered to be the original school within the Chilliwack School District with the first school house opening in 1871. The school location was first moved to the Chilliwack River in 1874, then new buildings were erected in 1907 and 1911 where the Southgate Shopping Centre now exists. In 1929, the present Central School was erected on Young Street North with eighteen rooms. The first Principal of Central was Harold Manuel. (1929-1950)

In 2007, Principal Clyde Dougans was named one of Canada's Outstanding Principals.

== Administration ==
Principals
Years	Principal
1929 – 1950	Mr. Harold Manuel
1950 - 1966	Mr. Carl Wilson
1966 - 1973	Mr. Peter Neumann
1973 - 1975	Mr. Don Few
1975 - 1980	Mr. Bob Hagkull
1980 - 1986	Mr. Bob Beckett
1986 - 1991	Mr. Lew Chater
1992 - 1996	Mr. Don Langford
1996 - 2007	Mr. Clyde Dougans
2007 - 2010	Mr. Scott Wallace
2011 - 2012	Mrs. Nadine Clattenburg
2012 - 2014	Mr. Jim Edgcombe
2014 - 2022	Mrs. Leslie Waddington
2022 - 2025	Mrs. Donna Arnold
2025–Present	Ms. Jaimee Charlie

Vice Principals
Years	Vice Principal
1929 – 1932	Miss Mary Thompson
1932 – 1937	Mr. Murdo Maclachlan
1937 – 1945	No VP
1945 - 1950	Mr. Wally Ferguson
1950 – 1965	No VP
1965 – 1968	Mr. Bob Beckett
1968 – 1970	Mr. Terry Bodman
1970 – 1973	Mr. Len Braun
1973 – 1978	Mr. Bill Smith
1978 – 1979	Mr. Kieth Gardiner
1980 – 1983	Mr. Dave Henn
1983 – 1984	Mr. Jim Todd
1984 - 1989	No VP
1989 – 1993	Mrs. Margo Valer
1993 – 1998	Mr. Darchan Chand
1999 - 2001	Mr. Wade Gemmel
2001 - 2002	Mrs. Patti Lawn
2002 - 2007	Mr. Scott Wallace
2007 - 2009	Mr. David Wellingham
2010 – 2011	Mrs. Colleen Larsen
2011 - 2012	Mr. Jim Edgcombe
2012 - 2015	Mr. Noel Sharman
2015 - 2017	Mr. Shawn McLeod
2017 - 2019	Ms. Jaimee Charlie
2019 - 2020	Ms. Kim Parker
2020 - 2022	Mrs. Donna Arnold
2022 - 2024	Mrs. Tsandlia Van Ry
2024–Present	Mrs. Monica Padgham

- Bob Beckett, Scott Wallace, Jim Edgcombe, Donna Arnold and Jaimee Charlie are the only admin to serve as both VP and Principal. Noel Sharman is the only former student of Central who has served as an administrator. Nadine Clattenburg was the first female to serve as Principal in 2011-12.

== Programs ==

Gateway For Families/Community School Coordinator Central has a full-time Gateway For Families/Community School Coordinator. Work includes overseeing the day-to-day operations of programs and activities governed by the CCECSS. The coordinator recruits, promotes, and provides year around site supervision for contracted programs/user groups. Her focus is on developing a working relationship with public and private agencies to recruit and coordinate services that empower the Central community children and their families. Additionally, the Coordinator oversees all aspects of 2nd Day and Gateway for Families. The position is governed by the CCECSS, the coordinator works in consultation with the principal. The responsibilities of the coordinator are determined by the Society in consultation with the principal (or designate) and in accordance with the Joint Use Agreement between School District 33 and the City of Chilliwack.

The coordinator's major responsibilities include:

- Program Development /Delivery/Facility Management
- Staff and Volunteer Management
- Community Liaison/Partnerships/Public Relations/Grantsmanship
- Policy Development
- Fundraising/Special Events Coordination
- Budget Developing/Monitoring/Payroll
- Second Day Development/Delivery/Management

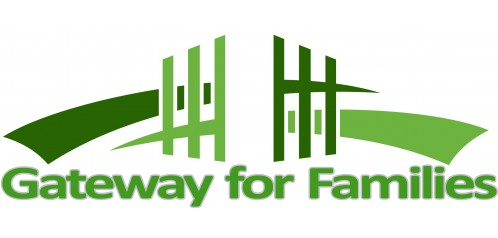
Gateway for Families

Central has been identified as a community hub called "Gateway for Families" which hosts Community Partner programming that respectfully engages inner core community members from all age, ethnic, and socio-economic realms in opportunities that promote health and independence in their lives. These supports are delivered mainly during the school day through the collaboration of community agencies that provide services to children and their families within the Chilliwack Downtown Community.

- Ministry of Children and Family Development continues to support the concept of neighborhood hubs by funding a family resource room & office space for the use of MCFD workers & community partners.
- Licensed infant/toddler daycare and preschool available for parents attending ongoing programs. Central Gateway Preschool also available to general public 3 mornings and 5 afternoons a week.
- Families First offers a support group to parents or caregivers of children ages 0–12 with the challenges of parenting.
- Family Literacy provides UFV upgrading, virtues parenting program, goal setting and life skills support & learning opportunities.
- Families In Motion view families as a learning unit, and provide support and learning opportunities for all family members.
- Education and Career Planning an upgrading course offered through the University of the Fraser Valley.
- Next Step provides intensive services to children with autism offered by Fraser Valley Child Development Centre.
- Chilliwack Learning Community Society provides outreach workers to tutor one on one to improve adult literacy skills.
- Sto:lo Nation and Aboriginal Child & Youth Mental Health provide culturally appropriate support services to children and their families.
- Success by 6 works with parents and communities so children 0-6 can be healthy, safe, secure, socially engaged, responsible and successful learners.
