= Art Jam =

- Genre: Education
- Created by: ABS-CBN Corporation via ABS-CBN Foundation; The Filipino Channel (TFC)
- Presented by: Tado; Epi Quizon; Nina Torres; Rosabelle Pangililinan (occasionally)
- Country of origin: Philippines
- Original language: Filipino

Production
- Running time: 30 minutes

Original release
- Network: ABS-CBN
- Release: April 17, 2004 – November 19, 2005

Art Jam is a Philippine television informative show broadcast by ABS-CBN. Hosted by Epy Quizon, Tado, Nina Torres and Rosabelle Pangilinan (occasionally), it aired from April 17, 2004 to November 19, 2005. It is targeted toward children and teaches how to make art.

== Art Jam segments ==
=== Playtime ===
In this segment, they make artwork tools such as cardboard, pencil, pentel pens, colored papers, cartolina, etc.

=== Food Trip ===
In this segment, they use foods to make edible artworks.

=== Sketch Pad ===
In this segment, they sketch drawings.

=== Junk Art ===
In this segment, they use recyclable materials to create artworks.

== See also ==
- Art Angel
- List of programs broadcast by ABS-CBN
