= Dead Ends =

Filipino hardcore-punk band

- Origin: Manila, Philippines
- Genres: Punk rock, hardcore
- Years active: 1985–1996
- Labels: TRC, Dead Ends Music
- Past members: Al Dimalanta; Jay Dimalanta; Rouen Pascual; Harley Alarcon; Bong Montojo; Lourd de Veyra

Dead Ends is a Filipino punk band that came out during the Philippine punk movement in the mid-1980s. Dead Ends released a total of four full-length independently produced underground punk albums in the band's lifetime from 1985 to 1996 as well as a fifth special edition greatest hits album in 2003.

== History ==
Al Dimalanta and half-brother Jay Dimalanta formed Dead Ends in 1985 with drummer Rouen Pascual. The band became part of the 80s Philippine punk scene which included other bands like Urban Bandits, the Wuds, Private Stock, Betrayed, G.I. and the Idiots and a host of other bands.

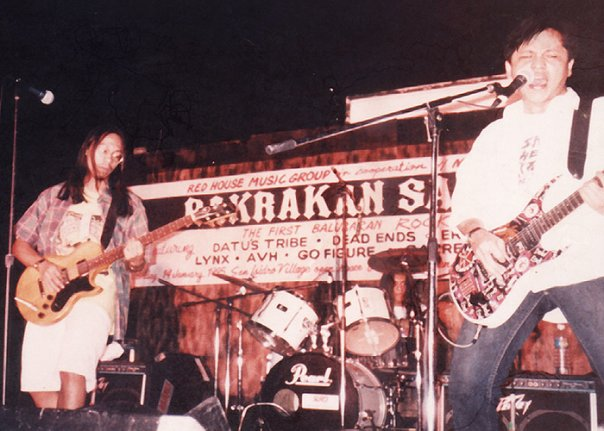
Dead Ends in 1996

Dead Ends had several line-up changes but brothers Al (on vocals and guitar) and Jay (on bass) remained as the nucleus of the band through the years. The band had three drummers: Rouen Pascual (for the band's first two albums, Complaints and Second Coming), Harley Alarcon (for the band's third album Damned Nation) and Bong Montojo (for the band's fourth album Mamatay sa Ingay with guitarist Lourd de Veyra).

Dead Ends’ albums, in chronological order, are Complaints (1986), Second Coming (1987), Damned Nation (1988), Mamatay sa Ingay (1995) and the greatest hits special edition album entitled Chosen (2003) which was released in honor of Jay Dimalanta (Al's half brother). The first three albums were released under the Twisted Red Cross label, while the fourth album was released under the band's own independent label.

The band's first album, Complaints (1986), was considered the very first full-length independently released album from an underground Pinoy punk band (note: although Tommy Tanchangco's Third World Chaos' full-length album preceded Dead Ends' debut album by a year, that particular album was released by RCA records, a mainstream record label). Dead Ends' second album, Second Coming (1987), release a year later, is also considered the very first full-length sophomore album from an underground Pinoy punk act back then.

Dead Ends disbanded following the death of co-founder Jay in 1996. Al Dimalanta continues to create and play punk music with his new band Throw (2001–present).

== Discography ==
Dead Ends' discography from 1986 to 1996 (including a 2003 greatest hits release).

- Complaints (1986)
- Second Coming (1987)
- Damned Nation (1988)
- Mamatay sa Ingay (1995)
- Chosen - Greatest Hits (2003)

== Band members ==
=== From 1985 to 1987 ===
- Al Dimalanta (guitar and vocals)
- Jay Dimalanta (bass)
- Roueen Pascual (drums)

=== From 1988 to 1989 ===
- Al Dimalanta (guitar and vocals)
- Jay Dimalanta (bass)
- Harley Alarcon (drums)

=== From 1995 to 1996 ===
- Al Dimalanta (guitar and vocals)
- Jay Dimalanta (bass)
- Lourd de Veyra (guitar)
- Bong Montojo (drums)
