= Outrageous Acts of Science =

- Also known as: You Have Been Warned
- Presented by: Ean Nusrun (South Asia), Karl Kruszelnicki (Australia)
- Narrated by: Gareth Cornick (United Kingdom), Tim Dadabo (United States)
- Countries of origin: United Kingdom; United States
- Original language: English
- No. of seasons: 10

Production
- Running time: 44 minutes
- Production company: October Films

Original release
- Network: Science Channel
- Release: 2012 (UK); April 20, 2013 – January 30, 2019 (US)

Outrageous Acts of Science is a science program shown on Science Channel in the United States, featuring a fast-paced countdown of the top 20 internet videos in each episode. The series first aired in the United Kingdom on Discovery International with the title You Have Been Warned. The program features homemade science experiments and stunts, often accompanied by warnings of "don't try this at home" when doing so might endanger the viewer. For the U.S. TV network, it was the top-rated show of 2015.

Each episode focuses on a particular science theme that features the cleverest, funniest, most daring, or just downright bizarre clips, along with an explanation and breakdown from science and engineering experts, including Hakeem Oluseyi, Debbie Berebichez, Carin Bondar and also-comedians Helen Arney, Matt Parker, Adam Ruben, and Tom Wrigglesworth, among others. The expert panel's explanations are accompanied by storytelling motion graphics and an explanation of what, how and why these clips were scientifically possible.

Outrageous Acts of Science is narrated by Tim Dadabo, while Gareth Cornick voices You Have Been Warned for Europe. In mid 2017, the last ten episodes of season seven aired on Discovery Channel (Australia) as Dr. Karl's Outrageous Acts of Science, hosted by Dr. Karl Kruszelnicki, with commentary by other Australians not seen in other versions of the show.

The first two seasons of You Have Been Warned are shown in Asia as well, with the third season of Outrageous Acts also airing there under the You Have Been Warned banner and intro. Two separate Asian versions were also created. In the first, titled You Have Been Warned with Ean Nasrun, Malaysian radio announcer and TV personality Ean Nasrun voices and appears on-screen in a separate version that aired on Discovery Channel Asia, along with some commentators' clips replaced by those featuring scientists from Malaysia. A second independent version, You Have Been Warned Asia, is also produced by Rohit Tharani for Discovery Channel Asia, hosted by five Filipinos, actor/comedian Ramon Bautista; director and performer RA Rivera; comedic performer Jun Sabayton; musician, TV presenter, and political commentator Lourd de Veyra; and actress, TV presenter, and motoring journalist Angel Rivero. The hosts provide the science behind the clips themselves rather than relying in a separate commentator panel in an edgier, more comedic take on the series.

The series is produced by October Films UK. In its tenth season, new episodes began airing in the U.S. on 17 October 2018. The first four episodes of season six were compilations of previous clips. A one-season spin-off called Outrageous Acts of Psych aired in the U.S. in 2015.

== Experts ==
Scientist	Knowledge domain	Season									
Scientist	Knowledge domain	1	2	3	4	5	6	7	8	9	10
Scientist	Knowledge domain	2012	2013	2015	2015	2016	2016	2016	2017	2018	2018
Helen Arney	Physicist	●	●	●	●	●	●	●	●	●	●
Debbie Berebichez	Physicist	●	●	●	●	●	●	●	●	●	●
Carin Bondar	Biologist	●	●	●	●	●	●	●	●	●	●
Eric Gradman	Robotic engineer	●	●	●	●	●	●	●	●	●	●
Ellie Harrison	Wildlife expert	●	●	●	●	●	●				
Alistair Linsell	Nuclear chemist	●	●	●	●	●	●	●	●	●	●
Mike North	Engineer	●	●	●	●	●	●	●	●	●	●
Hakeem Oluseyi	Astrophysicist	●	●	●	●	●	●	●	●	●	●
Simon Pampena	Mathematician	●	●	●	●	●	●	●	●	●	●
Matt Parker	Mathematician	●	●	●	●	●	●	●	●	●	●
Adam Ruben	Biologist	●	●	●	●	●	●	●	●	●	●
Saad Sarwana	Physicist	●	●	●	●	●	●	●	●	●	●
Tom Wrigglesworth	Engineer	●	●	●	●	●	●	●	●	●	●
Christina Aas	Engineer		●			●					
Uli Brandt-Bohne	Biochemist		●	●	●	●		●			
Simon Foster	Physicist		●			●	●				
Jessica Jensen	Engineer		●	●	●	●	●	●			
Chris Krishna-Pillay	Biologist		●	●	●	●	●	●	●	●	●
Sujata “Suze” Kundu	Material Chemist		●	●	●	●	●	●	●	●	●
Judy Lee	Engineer		●			●	●				
Hermes Gadelha	Mathematician			●	●	●	●	●			
Raychelle Burks	Chemist				●	●	●	●	●	●	●
Amy Elliott	Mechanical engineer					●	●	●	●	●	●

== Episodes ==
U.S. airdates and selected clip examples from each episode.

=== Season 1 ===
1. Homemade Heroes - April 20, 2013
2. Human Guinea Pigs - April 27, 2013
3. Natural Born Thrillers - May 4, 2013
4. Epic Stunts - May 11, 2013
5. Power Junkies - May 18, 2013
6. Dukes of Havoc - May 25, 2013

=== Season 2 ===
1. Kings of Carnage - February 15, 2014 -Destruction in the name of science, including using an MRI machine to destroy objects.
2. Show Offs - February 22, 2014 - Skills including tightrope walking between two trucks, a walrus that whistles, and a needle thrown through glass but not shattering it.
3. Daredevils - March 1, 2014 - Daredevil stunts, including "surfing" on a high-speed train, a dog walking on a tightrope, a motocross on water, "brain freeze", a backflipping car, jumping onto a cactus, and a skydiver walking from plane to plane.
4. Zeros to Heroes - March 8, 2014 - A Mexican firework hammer, freezing a tongue to a lamppost, superglue, and an easily scared man.
5. When Nature Calls - March 15, 2014 - A gorilla that walks like a person, clouds formed indoors, surfing glacier runoff, a wrong way to feed a crocodile, and a man that gets dangerously close to volcanoes.
6. Human Lab Rats - March 29, 2014 - Self-experimentation, including speed eating, a bot fly larva in a person's scalp, and a helicopter powered by a person.
7. The People's Vote - April 5, 2014 - The best of the first 12 episodes.
8. Masters of the Universe - April 12, 2014 - Vertical driving, a high-speed hammock, a man without a fear of heights, RC helicopter maneuvers, and a supersonic ping pong ball.
9. Freaks of Nature - April 19, 2014 - Featuring a washcloth wrung in outer space, a backwards-driving car, a "human axe" (Quantrel Bishop), naked at the South Pole, and using animals to catch animals.
10. Muthas of Invention - April 26, 2014 - Shooting rock salt to kill a housefly, a bicycle 14 feet (4.3 m) tall, a hover platform, human-powered cars, a solar 3D printer that melts layers of sand with a lens, and pulse-jet bicycle.
11. Backyard Boffins - May 3, 2014 - Backyard boffins, including a triple backflip on a BMX bike, homemade civil defense siren, and a submarine made from a propane tank.
12. Hackaverse - May 10, 2014 - Life hacks, featuring an inflatable snowmobile, a shopping cart rocket, an orchestra from drinking glasses, an explosion of gummy bears, bedbug "tattoos", and a car driven by an iPad.
13. Heroes and Hoaxers - May 17, 2014
14. Greatest Hits II - May 24, 2014 - The best clips from season two, as chosen by the scientists.
15. Most Dangerous - July 5, 2014
16. Biggest Explosions - July 12, 2014
17. Coolest Inventions - July 19, 2014
18. Worst Ideas - July 26, 2014
19. Craziest Driving - August 2, 2014
20. Greatest Hoaxes - August 9, 2014
21. Wildest Nature - August 16, 2014
22. Weirdest Science - August 16, 2014 (EP Guides)

=== Season 3 ===
1. Fact or Fake? - January 17, 2015 - Underwater BASE jumping and a billiards trick shot.
2. License to Thrill - January 24, 2015
3. Kings of Creation - January 31, 2015 - Ridiculous inventions, like a car that skips a jump rope, a robot that always wins at Rock Paper Scissors, and a single-wheeled motorbike.
4. Born to Be Wild - February 7, 2015 - More daredevils, including an avalanche survivor, a man who can hold his breath for more than 22 minutes, and one who walks between hot-air balloons a few thousand feet (over a kilometer) above ground.
5. Grand Masters - February 14, 2015 - A man drifting two cars at once, a snake able to open a door, and a three-year-old basketball player.
6. Tested on Humans - February 21, 2015 - A man who pops his eyes out of their sockets, contagious yawning, and a bike helmet with an emergency airbag.
7. Lord of the Elements - February 28, 2015 - A skydiver with a jetpack, levitating objects, and a solar car.
8. Cowboys of Chaos - March 7, 2015 - A homemade cannon, exploded houses, and magnets that can crush a person's hand.
9. Epic Fails - March 14, 2015 - An extreme surfing wipeout, the hardest tongue twister, and a man with an extreme fear of lobsters.
10. Urban Legends - March 21, 2015 - Home inventions, including a dangerous electric bike, a submarine under human power, and a full-sized car made of Legos.

=== Season 4 ===
1. Fact or Fiction - June 20, 2015 - Snow skiing on Hawaii's Mauna Kea, a wingsuit pilot towed by a car, a great white shark encounter, driving vertically, and a handgun trick shot.
2. Summer Wipeout - June 22, 2015
3. Kings Of Summer - June 23, 2015
4. Speed Freaks - June 27, 2015 - A car drives 1,000 feet (300 m) across water, a mantis shrimp with the fastest punch of any animal, bionic boots, and a car that jumps over a plane.
5. Fan Favorites - June 27, 2015
6. Home Hacks - July 4, 2015 - Motorcycle chariot racing, a homemade Iron Man-like exoskeleton, a plane flying with no wings, and a 9-foot (2.7 m) tall robotic insect.
7. No Limits - July 11, 2015 - A world-record truck jump, the world's fastest electric motorcycle, a 90-year-old gymnast, and a skydiver and wingsuit pilot who form a human flying carpet.
8. Win or Fail - July 18, 2015 - A spinning skydiver, a wasabi prank, and car jump that is the longest ever attempted.
9. Demolition Derby - July 25, 2015 - A man's finger that pokes through coconuts, a nearly indestructible Batman suit, and a 30-foot (9 m) robotic hand that can crush cars while controlled by a person with a glove.
10. Superhuman - August 1, 2015 - Walking on the ceiling with magnets, a knife/nunchuck master, a small arm-wrestler taking on a bodybuilder, and a man runs a loop-the-loop.
11. Forces of Nature - August 8, 2015 - A shark rescue, leeches as first aid, and a cluster balloon aircraft made of a lawn chair, helium balloons, and a "pilot" with shotgun.
12. Insane Inventions - August 15, 2015 - A car with color-changing paint, a model rocket that reaches the edge of space, a flying car, and a stunt machine that crosses a skateboard and tank.
13. Weird Science - August 22, 2015 - A ghost ship made of light projected into sprayed water, a bear with a human-like walk, and an uphill tightrope walk.

=== Season 5 ===
1. Like A Boss - January 9, 2016
2. Is This for Real? - January 16, 2016
3. Man vs. Nature - January 23, 2016
4. Epic Skills - January 30, 2016
5. Homemade Hotshots - February 6, 2016
6. Wild Rides - February 13, 2016
7. Brain Vs. Brawn - February 20, 2016
8. Killer Builds - February 27, 2016
9. Facepalm - March 5, 2016
10. Shock and Awesome - March 12, 2016

=== Season 6 ===
1. Not Safe for Work - June 22, 2016
2. Wild Things - June 29, 2016
3. Beast Mode - July 6, 2016
4. Transformers - July 13, 2016
5. Punked? - July 20, 2016
6. Nailed It - July 27, 2016
7. Garage Genius - August 3, 2016
8. Man vs. Animal - August 10, 2016
9. Don't Tell Mom

=== Season 7 ===
1. Power Hungry - October 26, 2016
2. Accident or Design - November 2, 2016
3. Movers and Makers - November 9, 2016
4. Power Up - November 16, 2016
5. Game Changers - January 4, 2017
6. Neighborhood Watch - January 11, 2017
7. Beta Testers - January 18, 2017
8. Fearless or Foolish - January 25, 2017
9. Amped Up - February 1, 2017
10. Truth or Troll - February 8, 2017
11. Natural Selection - February 15, 2017
12. Epic Elements - February 22, 2017
13. Crowd Pleasers - March 1, 2017
14. Moguls of Mayhem - March 8, 2017
15. Pure Power - March 15, 2017
16. Bucket List - March 22, 2017
17. Mind Benders - March 29, 2017

=== Season 8 ===
1. Life Hackers - June 20, 2017
2. Tons of Anarchy - June 27, 2017
3. Bragging Rights - July 4, 2017
4. Very Innovative People - July 11, 2017
5. Seriously? - July 18, 2017
6. Ground Breakers - July 25, 2017
7. No Brainers - August 1, 2017
8. Body Rockers - August 8, 2017
9. Rebooters - August 22, 2017
10. Masters of Disasters - August 29, 2017

=== Season 9 ===
1. Strangest Things - February 27, 2018
2. Mod Fathers - March 6, 2018
3. Owned It - March 13, 2018
4. Supernatural - March 20, 2018
5. How Not To - March 26, 2018
6. MVPs - April 3, 2018
7. Power Trippin' - April 10, 2018
8. Masters of Mayhem - April 17, 2018
9. Ultimate Upgraders - April 24, 2018
10. Mind Blown - May 1, 2018

=== Season 10 ===
1. Quantum Leaps - October 16, 2018
2. Only Natural - October 23, 2018
3. Savage Skills - October 30, 2018
4. This Changes Everything - November 6, 2018
5. Make It Real - November 13, 2018
6. Overachievers
7. Supercharged
8. Super Weird
9. Controlled Chaos
10. Unusual Suspects
