= Adam Ruben =

American science communicator (born 1979)

- Born: Philadelphia
- Website: adamruben.net

Adam Ruben (born 1979) is an American writer, comedian, rapper, storyteller, science communicator, and molecular biologist.

Ruben is known for hosting the show Outrageous Acts of Science on the Science Channel, known outside the United States as You Have Been Warned and Loco Lab. He has also appeared on the Food Network's Food Detectives, the Science Channel's Head Rush, the Weather Channel's Weather Gone Viral, the Travel Channel's Mysteries at the Kremlin, Discovery International's Superhuman Science, the Science Channel's How Do They Do It?, the documentary Mortified Nation, and NPR's All Things Considered and The Moth Radio Hour. He is the author of Surviving Your Stupid, Stupid Decision to Go to Grad School (Random House, 2010), a satirical guide to post-baccalaureate education, and Pinball Wizards: Jackpots, Drains, and the Cult of the Silver Ball (Chicago Review Press, 2017), a narrative nonfiction book about the past, present, and future of pinball. Ruben is also known for writing the monthly science humor column "Experimental Error" in the AAAS journal Science Careers. Ruben frequently gives keynote lectures and performances about science, education, career-related topics, comedy, science communication, and public perception of science, and he performs his one-man show about bullying, Please Don't Beat Me Up: Stories and Artifacts from Adolescence.

== Early life and education ==
Ruben was born in Philadelphia in 1979 and raised in Wilmington, Delaware, where he was one of seven valedictorians at Concord High School, a National Merit Scholar and a Presidential Scholar. He majored in Molecular Biology at Princeton University, graduating in 2001 with minors in Engineering Biology, Creative Writing, and Theater & Dance, receiving the Gregory T. Pope '80 Prize for Science Writing. While at Princeton, Ruben served as the drum major of the Princeton University Band and wrote sketches and songs for the Princeton Triangle Club.

He earned his Ph.D. in Biology at Johns Hopkins University in Baltimore in 2008, where he used isothermal titration calorimetry and spectrophotometry to quantify the enthalpic and entropic contributions of enzyme-ligand interactions, specifically the binding of novel hydroxymethylcarbonyl isotere-based dipeptidomimetic compounds to the plasmepsin family of aspartic proteases used by the malaria parasite Plasmodium falciparum for breaking down human hemoglobin. While at Johns Hopkins, Ruben taught classes in the Expository Writing Program, the School of Education, the Department of Film & Media Studies, and the summer program Discover Hopkins; he still teaches an undergraduate class called "The Stand-Up Comic in Society." For nearly 11 years, he worked on developing a whole-organism malaria vaccine at Sanaria Inc., where he served as the Associate Director of Vaccine Stabilization and Logistics. He currently resides in D.C..
