= Bakit Hindi Ka Crush ng Crush Mo? (book) =

2012 novel by Ramon Bautista

Bakit Hindi ka Crush ng Crush Mo?
- First edition
- Author: Ramon Bautista
- Language: Tagalog
- Genre: Love Story, Self-help
- Published: September 2012 (PSICOM Publishing, Inc.)
- Publication place: Philippines
- Media type: Print (hardcover, paperback)
- Pages: 200
- ISBN: 9789710573561

Bakit Hindi Ka Crush ng Crush Mo? is a novel written by Ramon Bautista and was published by PSICOM Publishing Inc. It is a compilation of the author's answers to love questions posted on his website. The novel was released in 2012 and converted into a movie with the same name released in July 2013 under Star Cinema.

== Plot ==
The story starts when a record company, A&A Records, has gone down to the bottom of the music industry. Miguel Prieto has passed the company to his son, Alex Prieto. Sandy Veloso, an ugly duck darling who has a boyfriend Edgardo Salazar. She becomes brokenhearted when she sees her boyfriend with a beautiful girl. Sandy is also a worker in A&A Records who is the personal assistant of Pamela. Alex finds a solution when the workers suggest Sandy because she has much knowledge in the music industry. First, Sandy suggests a band named Banda ni Kleggy. Next, she suggests Tangerine, a singer whose career has gone down.

After that, Sandy suggests Jireh Lim. But after their efforts to make the company down, they failed. Alex realizes that he likes Sandy.

Ramon Bautista states the reasons why your crush has no crush on you. The following are:

- he/she dislikes your handsomeness and your beauty
- your attitude is bad
- he/she didn't like your favorite television shows
- your horoscopes are not compatible
- your age is not suitable for his/her age
- one of you has a relationship
- if there is no relationship, he/she has a crush on others

At the end of the movie, which is of the same title, Alex Prieto kisses Sandy Veloso.

== Writing ==
Ramon Bautista's inspiration was the people who became crazy because of love. He said that people who become crazy because of love will have a special someone because they will not worry about love after their break-ups.

== Film adaptation ==
Star Cinema has announced that Kim Chiu and Xian Lim will be the tandem for the Star Cinema's twentieth anniversary film. Ramon Bautista, author and writer has given the copyrights to the Star Cinema, 6 months before the release of the movie. Kim Chui portrays Sandy Veloso and Xian Lim as Alex Prieto. The film got a box-office hit with PHP 102,600,634 as domestic gross and PHP 98,784,042 as international gross converted to a 42 peso-mark for a total of PHP 201,384,676 in the box-office for 3 weeks.
