= Ramon Bautista =

Filipino comedian (born 1986)

- Born: Ramon Victor Agas Bautista; May 20, 1978 (age 48); Manila, Philippines
- Other name: Monra
- Education: University of the Philippines Diliman (BA)
- Occupations: Actor; comedian; professor; businessman
- Years active: 2003–present
- Agent: SMNI (2025-present)

YouTube information
- Channel: Ramon Bautista
- Years active: 2007–present
- Subscribers: 274 thousand
- Views: 35.5 million
- Last updated: August 4, 2026

Ramon Victor Agas Bautista, known professionally as Ramon Bautista, is a Filipino comedian, television personality, filmmaker, writer, and academic. A prominent internet personality and noted car enthusiast, he is also known for his work as a YouTuber and vlogger, adopting the self-proclaimed title of "Internet Action Star."

He made his first television appearance as he played various characters in Strangebrew, a comedy-reality show television series aired from 2001 to 2003. In 2011, he became the main host of the news satire show May Tamang Balita on GMA News TV, and ran for two years. He was also an endorser for the Mitsubishi Adventure multipurpose-vehicle.

In 2012, he published his book, Bakit Hindi Ka Crush ng Crush Mo?, about a man who began to respect a woman after a makeover. The book was adapted to a film with the same name the next year, led by Xian Lim and Kim Chiu.

In 2013, he gained popularity among Filipino netizens when he published his YouTube relationship advice series, Tales from the Friend Zone (TFTFZ).

Bautista also hosted the localized comedy science programs Science of Stupid on National Geographic, and You Have Been Warned Asia on Discovery Channel.

Davao City officials declared him persona non grata in 2014 for his derogatory jokes against women from Davao. Among local leaders who expressed disappointment were Sara Duterte and Paolo Duterte. He expressed his apologies to former Davao Mayor (then-President) Rodrigo Duterte and was forgiven since.

Complementing his public persona is a set of personal philosophies that he has consistently shared with his audience, often becoming memorable quotes. His most famous adage, "There's more to life than love," served as the closing statement for his Tales from the Friend Zone series and encapsulates his core message of self-worth and personal development beyond romantic pursuits. In an interview, he revealed that this realization came to him during a time when he needed to move on from his own heartbreak. Other notable quotes that reflect his worldview include, "The best revenge is to live an awesome life," and the humorously pragmatic, "Lowering your standards is the key to happiness". These statements, delivered with his characteristic blend of sincerity and wit, form the foundation of the "tough love" ethos that first endeared him to a generation of followers seeking advice not just on love, but on life.

== Education and academic career ==
Unlike many children his age, Bautista's home was not filled with comic books but with periodicals like Time and Newsweek, which his parents kept around the house. This environment fostered a distinctly intellectual upbringing. His early exposure to global affairs and serious journalism cultivated what he and his childhood friend, future filmmaker RA Rivera, called their "closet interests" in substantive topics such as world trade and food security.

Bautista attended the University of the Philippines Integrated School for his primary and secondary education. He later pursued a degree in Film and Audio-Visual Communication at the University of the Philippines Diliman.

His undergraduate thesis, a short animated film titled Makina, won first prize in its category at the 20th CCP Gawad para sa Alternatibong Pelikula at Video in 2008, marking an early success in his filmmaking career. He has served as lecturer at his alma mater's College of Mass Communication since 2001 and has also taken units in the university's master's degree program.

== Personal life ==
Bautista is the second of three children and the only son of Ernesto and Leonida (née Agas) Bautista. His parents were employees at the University of the Philippines; his father worked as a clerk and his mother served as a teacher and administrative staff member. This lifelong connection to the university environment led to him completing his own education entirely within the UP system.

Despite the shared surname, he is not related to the Revilla political family, whose patriarch was former Senator Ramon Revilla Sr. (born Jose Acuña Bautista). Bautista has humorously addressed this coincidence in his vlogs, citing an instance where a road worker mistook him for a "junior" member of the political clan. He clarified they were unrelated but quipped that he sometimes wished they were.

He is an avid car enthusiast whose interest spans from performance-oriented Japanese Domestic Market (JDM) vehicles to comfortable, practical cars. His collection includes a Suzuki Swift, a Suzuki Jimny, Mazda CX8, a first-generation Honda CR-V, and a centerpiece trio of Mitsubishi Lancers. Of the Lancers, his 1995 Lancer EL (his first car) has undergone a full conversion to Lancer Evolution III (CE9A) specifications, while his 2000 model has been modified to resemble the Lancer Evolution VI. This practice of converting base models is common among enthusiasts in the Philippines, as the high-performance Evolution line was not officially sold in the country.

Bautista actively shares his automotive passion on his vlog, where he reviews a wide range of cars, from fellow enthusiasts' custom JDM builds to practical daily drivers.

== Filmography ==
The following is the list of movies and series in which Ramon Bautista has appeared in various roles:

=== Movies ===
Year	Title	Role
2003	Keka	Showbiz Kachipan Chipples
2005	Sa Ilalim ng Cogon	Sgt. Romero
2006	Green Rocking Chair	
2006	Seroks	Raho
2007	Juan Baybayin	
2007	Sinungaling na Buwan	
2011	San Lazaro	Limuel
2011	Rakenrol	Flame Tigerblüden
2012	MNL 143	Himself
2012	Qwerty	Silao
2012	Tiktik: The Aswang Chronicles	Bart
2013	Bakit Hindi Ka Crush ng Crush Mo?	Himself/taxi driver
2014	Kubot: The Aswang Chronicles 2	Justiniani
2020	Death Of Nintendo	Guard

=== Television ===
Year	Title
2001–2003	Strangebrew
2006–2007	The Ramon Bautista Show
2006–2007	Gameplan
2009–2010	The Weekend News
2011–2013	May Tamang Balita
2012–2013	Sarap at Home S4
2014–2016	Science of Stupid
2015–2016	Sports 360
2015–2016	Barangay Utakan
2015–2017	Kontrabando
2017–2018	You Have Been Warned Asia

=== Music videos ===
Year	Title	Artist
2004	Astro	Radioactive Sago Project
2006	Wasak na Wasak	Radioactive Sago Project
2011	Siguro	Yeng Constantino
2013	Bakit Hindi Ka Crush Ng Crush Mo?	Zia Quizon
2013	The Noon At Ngayon Song	Krazykyle
2019	Doble Kara	MZhayt

== Authored books ==
- Bakit Hindi Ka Crush ng Crush Mo?. Quezon City: Viva PSICOM. 2012. ISBN 9789710573561.
- Help!!! Ayoko Na Sa Syota Ko!. Quezon City: ABS-CBN Publishing. 2014. ISBN 9789718161234.
- Malapit Na, Unggoy. Quezon City: ABS-CBN Publishing. 2016. ISBN 9789718161746.
