= School District 33 Chilliwack =

School district in British Columbia, Canada

- School District 33 Chilliwack logo

Location
- 8430 Cessna Drive; Chilliwack, BC Chilliwack, Sardis, Rosedale, Yarrow, Cultus Lake & Greendale in the Fraser Valley Canada

District information
- Motto: Partners in Learning
- Superintendent: Rohan Arul-pragasm
- Asst. superintendent(s): Paula Jordan; Kirk Savage; David Manuel
- Chair of the board: David Swankey
- Schools: 32
- Budget: $248 million CAD (2024–2025)

Students and staff
- Students: 15,321 (2023)
- Staff: 2,400

Other information
- Website: www.sd33.bc.ca

School District 33 Chilliwack is a school district in the Fraser Valley region of British Columbia, Canada. It has an enrollment of approximately 15,321 full students, and approximately 2,400 teachers and support staff. Its annual budget for the 2023/24 school year is $248,394,300 CAD.

The District operates under authority of the School Act of British Columbia. It is governed by Board of Education consisting of seven trustees elected to four-year terms and is funded principally by the Province of British Columbia through the Ministry of Education.

== History ==
The Chilliwack School District was created on June 16, 1870. James Kennedy was the first teacher appointed by the Province of British Columbia in Chilliwack, on June 18, 1872.

== Schools ==
School	Grades
Bernard Elementary	K-5
Cheam Elementary	K-5
Central Elementary	K-5
Cultus Lake Community School	K-5
East Chilliwack Elementary	K-5
Evans Elementary	K-5
Greendale Elementary	K-5
Leary Integrated Arts & Technology	K-5
Little Mountain Elementary	K-5
McCammon Elementary	K-5
Promontory Heights Community Elementary	K-5
Robertson Elementary	K-5
Sardis Elementary	K-5
Strathcona Elementary	K-5
Tyson Elementary	K-5
Unsworth Elementary	K-5
Vedder Elementary	K-5
Watson Elementary	K-5
Yarrow Community School	K-5
Rosedale Traditional Community	K-8
Stitó:s Lá:lém Totí:lt	K-8
A D Rundle Middle School	6-8
Chilliwack Middle School	6-8
Mount Slesse Middle School	6-8
Vedder Middle School	6-8
Chilliwack Secondary	9-12
G. W. Graham Secondary	9-12
Imagine High Integrated Arts/Technology	9-12
Kw'íyeqel Secondary	9-12
Sardis Secondary	9-12
Fraser Valley Distance Education	10-12
Continuing Ed SD 33	12

== Board of Education ==
The district is governed by the school board, which consists of seven trustees elected at-large every four years. The most recent election was on October 15, 2022. The next scheduled election will be October 17, 2026. A vacancy was created on the Board when Trustee Heather Maahs was elected to be the Member of the Legislative Assembly for Chilliwack North in the 2024 British Columbia general election. Laurie Throness was elected in a byelection on 1 March 2025.

- David Swankey, Chair
- Teri Westerby, Vice Chair (on leave)
- Carin Bondar, Trustee
- Richard Procee, Trustee
- Willow Reichelt, Trustee
- Margaret Reid, Trustee
- Laurie Throness, Trustee

=== 2022 election results ===
Candidate	Votes	%
Carin Bondar (elected)	8,888	51.26
Willow Reichelt (elected)	8,287	47.8
Margaret Reid (elected)	8,116	46.81
David Swankey (elected)	8,047	46.41
Teri Westerby (elected)	7,584	43.74
Heather Maahs (resigned)	7,075	40.81
Richard Procee (elected)	7,047	40.64
Brian VanGarderen	7,000	40.64
Elliott Friesen	6,767	39.03
Darrell Furgason	6,451	37.21
Kaethe Jones	6,423	37.05
Barry Neufeld	6,006	34.64
Lewis Point	4,364	25.17
Greg Nelmes	4,133	23.84
Darren Ollinger	1,402	8.09

=== 2025 byelection results ===
Candidate	Votes	%
Laurie Throness (elected)	3,977	55
Katie Bartel	3,163	44
Shane Kooyman	94	1

Source: "2025 Chilliwack School District No. 33 by-election results". chilliwack.com. City of Chilliwack.

== See also ==
- Barry Neufeld
- Carin Bondar
- Education in British Columbia
- Higher education in British Columbia
- List of school districts in British Columbia
