= Earth-Touch =

African Lion (Panthera leo)

Hippopotamus (Hippopotamus amphibius)

Leopard (Panthera pardus)

African Elephant (Loxodonta africana)

Earth Touch is a South Africa-based multimedia company that disseminates its content across multiple platforms, including television networks, video and DVD, the Internet and mobile phones. Earth Touch focuses on topics relating to natural history and wildlife, particularly nature documentaries.

== Background ==
Established in 2007, Earth Touch pioneered a rapid filming and production cycle using high definition (HD) cameras and satellites. Earth Touch has since built up an extensive archive of HD footage of animal behaviour, filmed primarily in southern Africa, but also Thailand, Antarctica, Indonesia, Brazil, Ecuador and the United States. The company also produced a number of wildlife and nature broadcast programmes that were screened in South Africa and Australia.

== Collaborations ==
Earth Touch is a content partner in the WikiProject Lights Camera Wiki!, a collaboration designed to encourage public creation of video content for Wikipedia. Earth Touch videos were used for the Wildlife section of this initiative.

== Recognition/Awards ==
In 2008, Earth Touch's Wildlife podcasts received the ARKIVE NEW MEDIA AWARD at the Wildscreen Panda Awards. The award is given to the project that best explores the interactive potential of digital technology to raise awareness and understanding of the natural world.

== Earth Touch News Network (online) ==
http://www.earthtouchnews.com currently hosts over 2000 wildlife videos and new clips are added on a regular basis. The videos are available for viewing and download on a number of new media distribution platforms, including MIRO, iTunes, VUZE and YouTube.

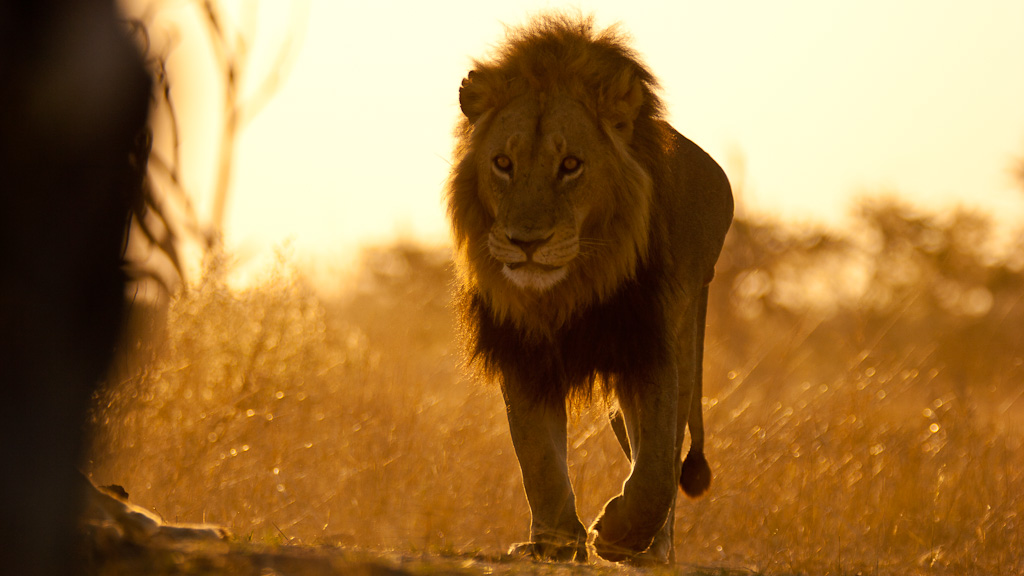

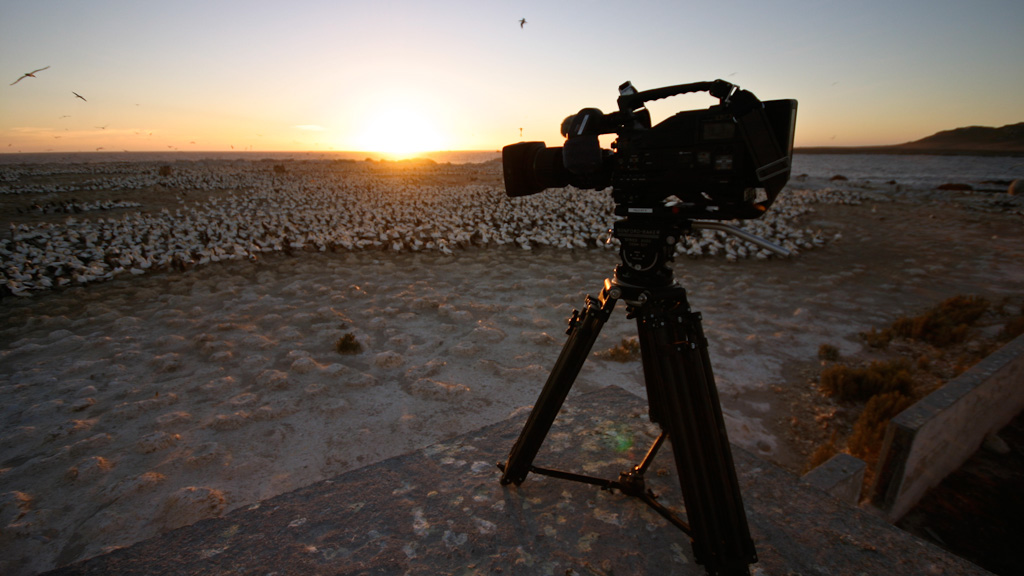

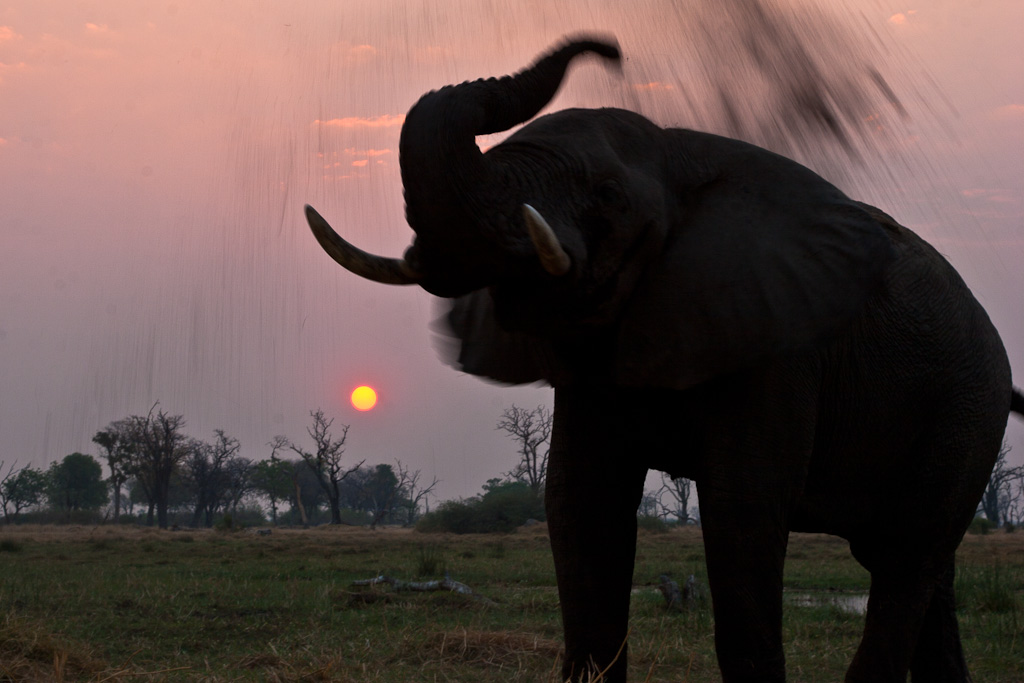

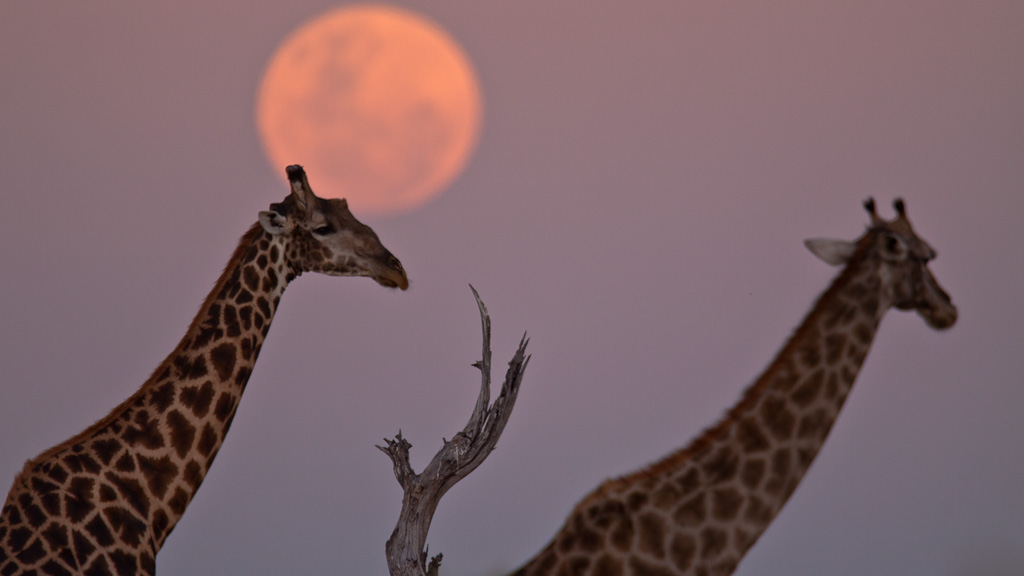

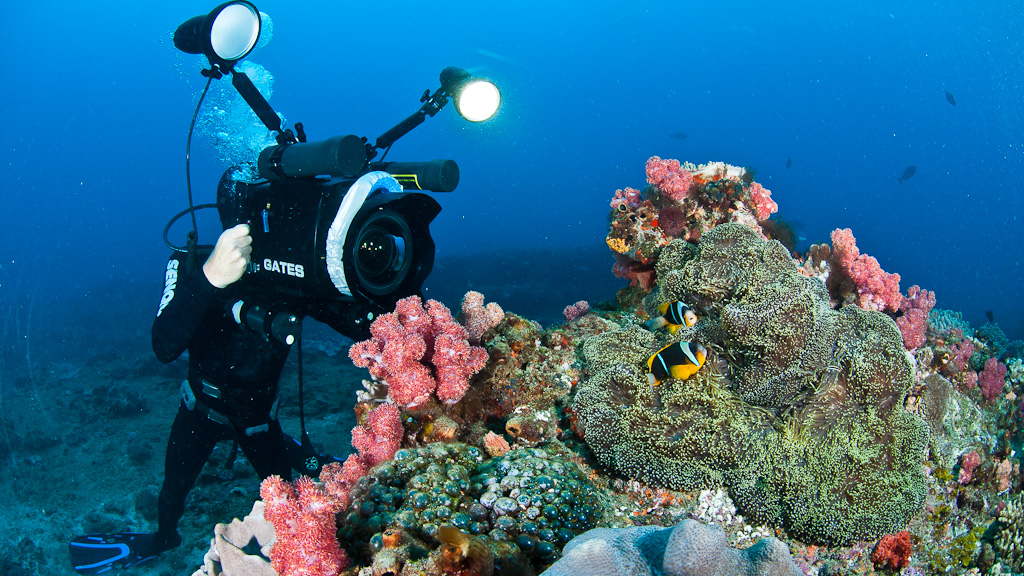
