= Sardis Secondary School =

Location
- 45460 Stevenson Rd; Chilliwack, British Columbia, V2R 2Z6; Canada; 49.12187°N 121.96759°W

Information
- School type: Public, high school
- Founded: 1933
- School board: School District 33 Chilliwack
- School number: 3333018
- Principal: Lynnet Schramm
- Staff: 100+
- Grades: 9-12 (13+ for students who choose to stay)
- Enrollment: 2,100+ as of March 2026
- Language: English and the French immersion program is offered
- Colours: Green, white
- Mascot: Freddy Falcon
- Team name: Falcons
- Website: www.sardissecondary.ca

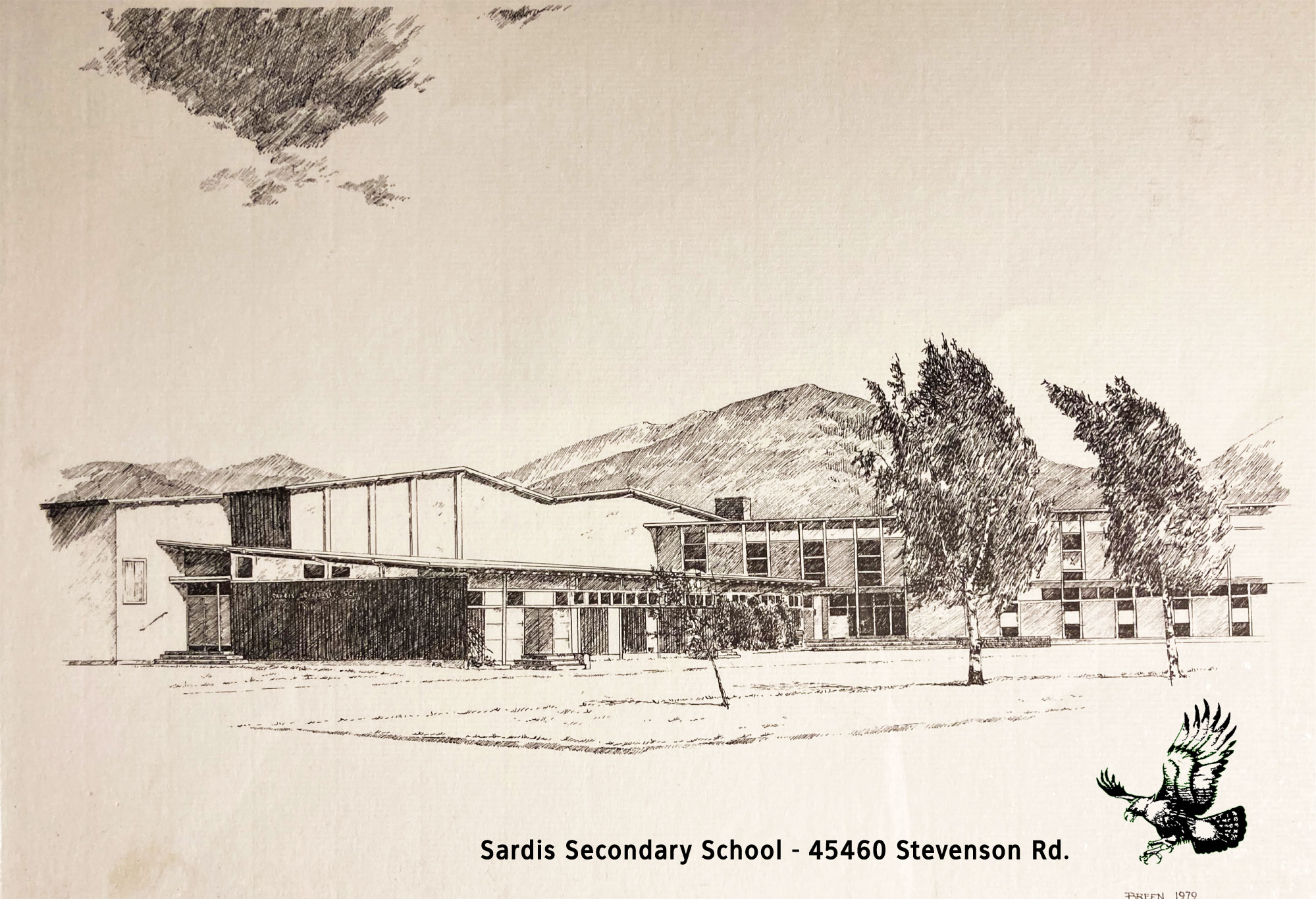
Original SSS building that was demolished in 1995 and replaced by the current school

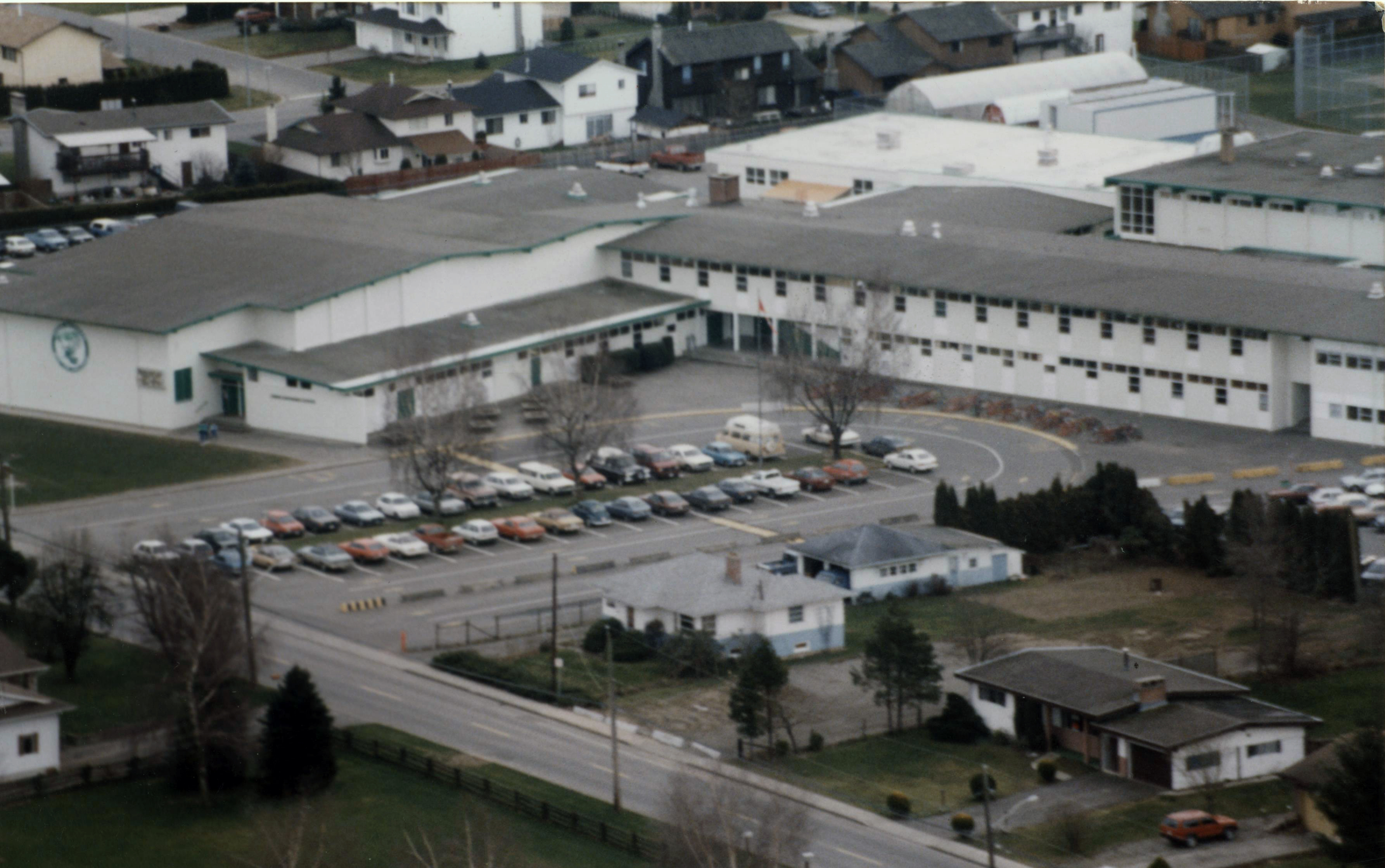
Looking southeast, 1994

Sardis Secondary (SSS) is a public high school in Chilliwack, British Columbia part of School District 33 Chilliwack. The current principal is Lynnet Schramm.

Sardis Secondary has a focus on agricultural and skilled trades education. The school is also somewhat distinctive in having an active high school football team.

A new addition for the school was approved in 2024 and was finished in august 2026. The project aims to expand the school and enroll 400 more students. It has an estimated project value of 40 million Canadian dollars; funded by the provincial government

== Controversies ==
In 2013, 12 students were suspended for a semester for using marijuana and breaking curfew on a school trip. The punishment was appealed by some parents and received a small amount of national news coverage.

In December of 2023, one of the teachers, Kevin Sigaty, was suspended for making a recent graduate uncomfortable. Sigaty and the former student had been communicating through Instagram in a friendly manner. In August of 2023, Sigaty told the student that he had a graduation gift for her. Around September, the student went to the school to pick up the gift, which was two books worth 50$. This made the student uncomfortable. Later in September, Sigaty invited the student to come to his classroom in October to watch a halloween movie. This resulted in her denying and blocking Sigaty. Sigaty then made a new account to apologize. In December of 2025, Sigaty agreed to a 3 day suspension of his certificate of qualification.

== Curriculum ==
In 2015, the sustainable agriculture program was expanded with the purchase of the SSS Farm. Students grow food for a community-supported agriculture program. Participation in the program is worth four course credits, the same amount as a standard class. The program was developed with support from the University of the Fraser Valley, a university local to Chilliwack and Abbotsford.

With the end of the 2023 school year, the 20+ year old Computer Science program was shut down due to the lack of any available Computer Science teachers in British Columbia.

== Awards and accomplishments ==
In 2022, the Drumline placed third in the BC Provincial Championships, hosted by the Canadian Drumline Association, losing only to MEI and Collingwood. In 2024 and 2025, The senior drumline placed 2nd in the BC drumline provincials, with MEI taking first.
