= Radioactive Sago Project =

Filipino band

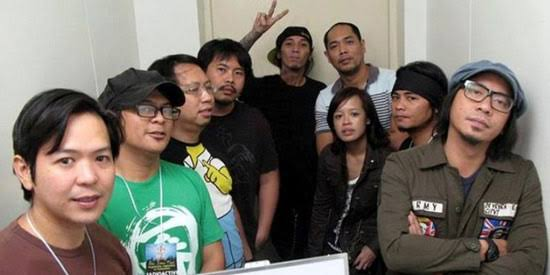

Background information
- Origin: Quezon City, Philippines
- Genres: Alternative rock, ska punk, jazz fusion, salsa
- Years active: 1997–2015 • 2022–present (reunions)
- Labels: Viva Records (2000); Terno Recordings (2004–present)
- Members: Lourd de Veyra; Junji Lerma; Francis de Veyra; Wawi Anzano; Pards Tupas; Ryan Zapanta; Arwin Nava; Jay Gapasin; B-Boy Garcia
- Past members: EJ Delgado; Josefa Alovera; Roxy Modesto; Jed Punongbayan; Julie J. Julie; Rastem Eugenio

Radioactive Sago Project is a Filipino jazz rock band formed in 1997 in Quezon City, Philippines. The band's sound is a fusion of spoken-word poetry, bebop jazz, and punk. Subjects in their material range from politics, drugs, alcohol, random musings and current issues.

Fronted by award-winning poet and broadcaster Lourd de Veyra, the band has released four albums. The first, a self-titled album, was released under Viva Records in 2000. This was followed by Urban Gulaman in 2004 and Tangina Mo Andaming Nagugutom sa Mundo Fashionista Ka Pa Rin in 2007 and Ang Itlog at ang Demonyo in 2014, all under Terno Recordings.

== Career ==
In 2000, the band released its first single, "Gusto Ko Ng Baboy", about a young man's fascination with pigs since his childhood. As the song progresses, it becomes a political tirade against corruption, which also symbolizes the pork barrel.

In 2004, they released the single "Astro", from Urban Gulaman, depicting a person's addiction to cigarette smoking. This was titled after Astro, a now-defunct, cheap brand of cigarettes sold in impoverished areas. The song was used on the Pinoy/Blonde soundtrack the following year. A second single entitled "Alaala ni Batman" was also released. It tells the story of a man's idolization of Batman since his childhood. The song progresses into ruminations on politics and society, and how these factors contribute to the demise of the Philippine economy and society. At the end of the song, the persona jumps off the top of a building believing he could fly, only to realize that Batman cannot fly.

In 2005, the band received three nominations at the MTV Pilipinas Video Music Awards for Favorite Group, Best Video, and Best Director (R.A. Rivera). The band won Best Video, and Best Director (R.A. Rivera).

In later years, songs from the group became the chosen theme songs for de Veyra’s TV shows on TV5. "Astro" and "Huwag Kang Maingay May Naglalaba" from Urban Gulaman became the theme songs of late night news program TEN: The Evening News and satirical news and commentary web series Kontrabando, respectively, while "Wasak na Wasak" from Tanginamo Andaming Nagugutom sa Mundo Fashionista Ka Parin became the theme of late night talk show Wasak, and on its top 5 segment, it uses "Gusto Ko Ng Baboy" as background.

== Discography ==
=== Studio albums ===
Year	Album
2000	The Radioactive Sago Project: Released: 2000; Label: Viva Records; Format: CD, Album, Streaming Platforms
2004	Urban Gulaman: Released: 2004; Label: Terno Recordings; Format: CD, Album, Digipak, Streaming Platforms
2007	Tanginamo Andaming Nagugutom Sa Mundo Fashionista Ka Parin: Released: 2007; Label: Terno Recordings; Format: CD, Album, Digipak, Streaming Platforms
2014	Ang Itlog At Ang Demonyo: Released: 2014; Label: Terno Recordings; Format: CD, Album, Digipak, Streaming Platforms

=== Compilation Tracks ===
Year	Song	Album
2004	Nalulunod Sa Isang Basong Tubig	Supersize Rock (Warner Music Philippines, 2004)
2005	Alkohol	Ultraelectromagneticjam!: The Music Of The Eraserheads (Sony BMG Music Philippines, 2005)
2006	Kapalaran	The Best Of Manila Sound: Hopia Mani Popcorn (Viva Records, 2006)
2006	Mr. Pogi In Space	Environmentally Sound: A Select Anthology of Songs Inspired by the Earth (World Wildlife Fund, Ayala Land, 2006)
2007	Syotang Pa-class	Kami nAPO Muna Ulit (Universal Records, 2007)
2008	Kung Ano Ang Meron	Huling Balita: Songs for the Disappeared (Free Jonas Burgos Movement, 2008)

== Members ==
- Lourd de Veyra - vocals
- Francis De Veyra - bass
- Jay Gapasin - drums
- Junji Lerma - guitar
- Wowie Ansano - trumpet
- Pards Tupas - trombone
- Roxy Modesto - saxophone
- Rastem Eugenio - saxophone
- Arwin Nava - percussion
- B-Boy Garcia - turntables

== Past members ==
- EJ Delgado - guitars
- Josefa Alovera - saxophone
- Ryan Zapanta - saxophone
- Jed Punongbayan - Piano
- Julie J. Julie- Synth

== Singles and music videos ==
- "Gusto ko ng Baboy (Jovelyn Laborte)"
- "Astro" (TEN: The Evening News, Theme song of the TV5 News program from 2008–2010)
- "Gin Pomelo"
- "Panic Buying Sa Duljo"
- "Hello Hello"
- "Wasak na Wasak"
- "Kapalaran" (original by Rico J. Puno)
- "Alaala ni Batman"
- "Alkohol" (original by Eraserheads)
- "Syotang Pa-Class" (original by APO Hiking Society)
- "Alak, Sugal, Kape, Babae, Kabaong"
- "Trip" ("Recorded from Tower Sessions")
- "Super Hatdog"
- "Bosnots & Friends"

== Awards and nominations ==
Year	Award giving body	Category	Nominated work	Results
2001	NU Rock Award	Best New Artist	—N/a	Nominated
2004	NU Rock Awards	Rock Video of the Year	"Astro"	Won
2005	NU Rock Awards	Best Live Act	—N/a	Nominated
2006	MYX Music Awards	Favorite Indie Artist	—N/a	Nominated
2007	NU Rock Awards	Producer of the Year	Lourd and Francis De Veyra for "Tangina Mo Ang Daming Nagugutom Sa Mundo Fashionista Ka Pa Rin"	Won
2007	NU Rock Awards	Guitarist of the Year	(for Junji Lerma)	Nominated
2007	NU Rock Awards	Bassist of the Year	(for Francis de Veyra)	Nominated
2007	NU Rock Awards	Best Live Act	—N/a	Nominated
2007	NU Rock Awards	Artist of the Year	—N/a	Nominated
2007	NU Rock Awards	Album of the Year	"Tangina Mo Andaming Nagugutom sa Mundo Fashionista Ka Pa Rin"	Nominated
2008	MYX Music Awards	Favorite Indie Artist	—N/a	Nominated
