= Lourd de Veyra =

Filipino musician, writer and broadcaster (born 1975)

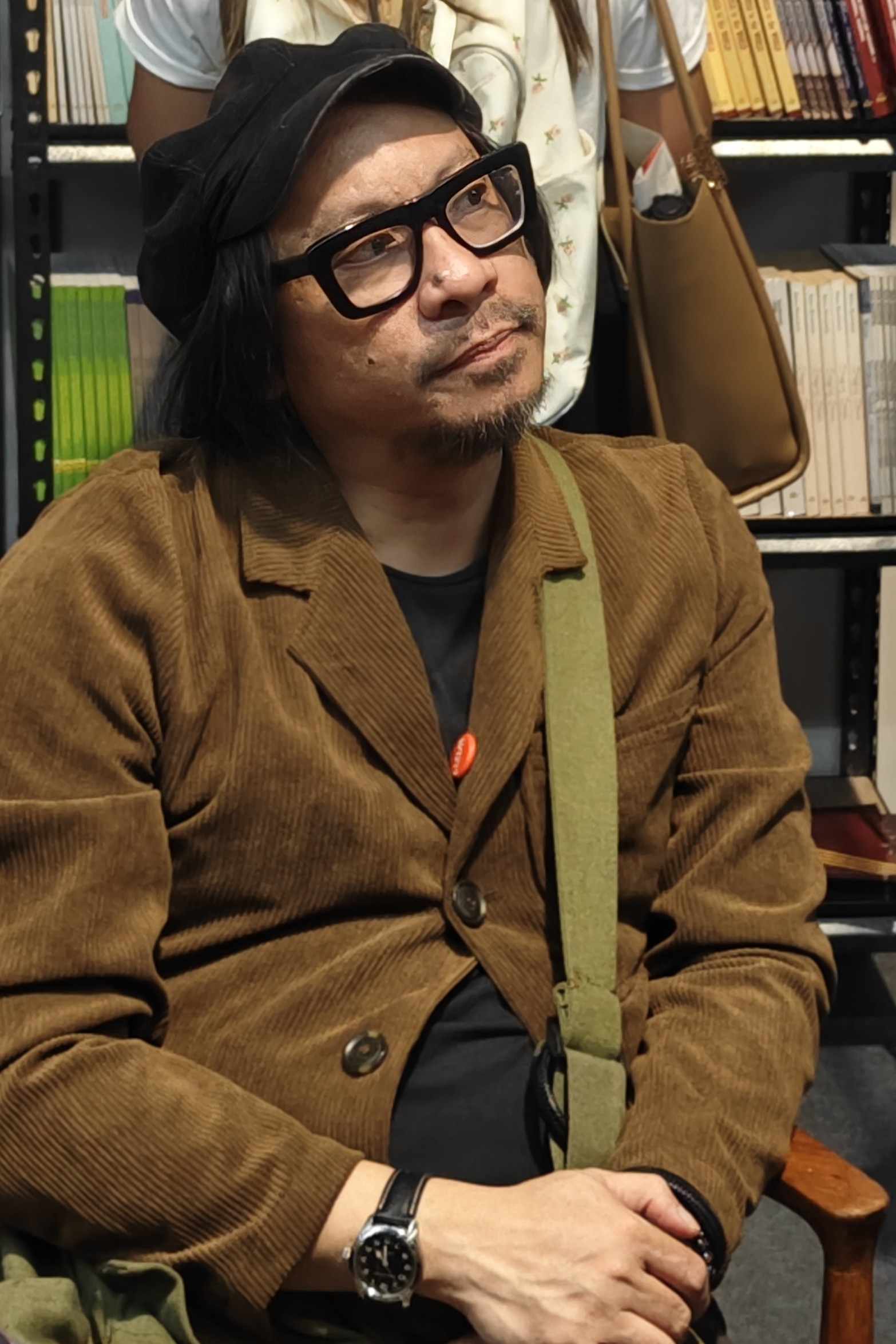
- Born: Lourd Ernest Hanopol de Veyra; February 11, 1975 (age 51); Quezon City, Rizal, Philippines
- Education: University of Santo Tomas (BA)
- Occupations: Journalist; radio and TV host; musician; historian
- Relatives: Mike Hanopol (maternal uncle)
- Writing career
- Genres: Poetry, essays, novels
- Notable works: Word of the Lourd; History with Lourd; Wasak; Kontrabando; This is a Crazy Planets; SuperPanalo Sounds!
- Notable awards: 1999 Don Carlos Palanca Memorial Award for Literature (Third Prize in Essay, English Division); 2003 Don Carlos Palanca Memorial Award for Literature (Second Prize in Essay, English Division); 2004 Don Carlos Palanca Memorial Award for Literature (First Prize in Teleplay, Filipino Division)
- Musical career
- Genres: Hardcore punk; alternative rock; jazz fusion; ska; spoken word
- Instruments: Vocals; guitar
- Member of: Radioactive Sago Project; Kapitan Kulam
- Formerly of: Dead Ends

Lourd Ernest Hanopol de Veyra (Tagalog pronunciation: [de ˈbeɪɾa]; born February 11, 1975) is a Filipino musician, emcee, poet, journalist, TV host, historian, broadcast personality and activist who became famous as the vocalist of the Manila-based jazz rock band Radioactive Sago Project.

== Life and career ==
=== Education ===
De Veyra went to Quirino Elementary School for grade school and to Colegio de San Juan de Letran for high school. He then graduated with a Bachelor of Arts in journalism from the University of Santo Tomas.

=== Early musical career ===
When the hardcore punk band Dead Ends ended their four-year hiatus, he became one of the band's guitarists in 1994, sharing guitar chores with the band's leader and founder Al Dimalanta, making Dead Ends a four-piece band. The band then recorded their comeback and final album, the influential Mamatay sa Ingay (1995); it had a sound different from their past materials, having more of a crossover thrash approach. Dead Ends disbanded in 1996 because of Jay Dimalanta's death, after which de Veyra briefly became a member of Al Dimalanta's new band Throw; the band also included de Veyra's brother Francis, who played the bass. Lourd de Veyra is the nephew of singer/guitarist Mike Hanopol.

=== Television ===
De Veyra was one of the hosts of Sapul sa Singko, Aksyon on TV5, Tayuan Mo at Panindigan, and Wasak (with Jun Sabayton) on AksyonTV. He was also the main host of the action documentary show Lupet until its relaunch in early 2011.

In 2013, de Veyra hosted a documentary series for TV5 called History with Lourd.

In 2017, de Veyra hosted comedy science program You Have Been Warned Asia which broadcast across Southeast Asia on Discovery Channel.

In 2019, de Veyra hosted the late night commentary talk program Wag Po!, aired originally on TV5 and One PH with a radio simulcast on Radyo5 92.3 News FM (now 105.9 True FM) from 8PM-9PM, until March 2023.

Since 2023, de Veyra hosted the morning radio drama Sana Lourd, which airs from Mondays to Saturdays (initially from 11AM-1PM, then from 10AM-12NN, and now from 11AM-12NN), on 92.3 Radyo5 True FM (now 105.9 True FM), True TV (until August 14, 2026) and One PH.

Since August 10, 2026, de Veyra became the new anchor for Frontline Tonight, replacing Ed Lingao who moved to the morning edition.

=== Books ===
De Veyra has published five books of poetry: Subterranean Thought Parade, Shadowboxing in Headphones and Insectissimo. He released his fourth book of poetry in 2020, titled Marka Demonyo (Demon's Mark in English). In 2025, he released Pagpag: Poems, Precautions, Meditations, and Other Protestations.

His Spot.ph blog This is a Crazy Planets spawned two volumes collecting his essays, one in 2011 and one in 2013.

His first novel, Super Panalo Sounds!, was released in 2011.

In 2014, de Veyra released a compilation of his speeches titled Lourd de Veyra's Little Book of Speeches and a book about the culture of alcohol in the Philippines titled Espiritu at the 35th Manila International Book Fair. In 2018, a book tie-in with his TV5 history documentary series was released.

== Awards ==
He has thrice been a recipient of a Don Carlos Palanca Memorial Award for Literature - A third prize in essay (English division) in 1999, a second prize in the same category in 2003, and a first prize in teleplay (Filipino division) in 2004.

=== Awards and nominations ===
Year	Award-giving body	Category	Recipient	Result	Source
2017	2nd Guild of Educators, Mentors, and Students (GEMS)	Best Program Host	Lourd de Veyra	Won	
2017	5th EdukCircle Awards	Best Educational Show Host	Lourd de Veyra	Won	
2014	National Commission on Culture and the Arts	Best Culture-Based Documentation Host	Lourd de Veyra	Won	

== See also ==
- Radioactive Sago Project
