= List of programs broadcast by True FM/One PH =

These are the programs that have been currently aired on 105.9 True FM and its television counterparts One PH.

== Current programming ==
=== News ===
- One Balita Pilipinas (2019–present)
  - One Balita Pilipinas Weekend (2026–present)
- One Balita Bai (2024–present)

=== Talk ===
- Julius and Tintin: Para sa Pamilyang Pilipino (2022–present)^{1}

=== Public affairs ===
- Ted Failon at DJ Chacha sa True FM (2020–present)^{345}

=== Public service ===
- Wanted sa Radyo (2011–present)^{4}

=== Entertainment ===
- Cristy FerMinute (2010–present)

=== Programs from TV5 ===
- Frontline Pilipinas (2020–present)^{3}
- Frontline Pilipinas Weekend (2023–present)^{34}

=== Programs from One News ===
- The Big Story (2024–present)^{1}

==== Notes ====
1. Programs that are exclusively aired on One PH.
2. Programs that are exclusively aired on True FM.
3. Hookup/delayed telecast with TV5.
4. Hookup/delayed telecast with RPTV.
5. Hookup/delayed telecast with FMR Philippines

== Previously aired programs ==
- A Secret in Prague (2026)
- Aksyon (2010–20)
- Andar ng mga Balita (2010–12)
- At the Moment with Imee (2024–25)
- Bitag Live (2013–17)
- E.A.T. (2023)
- Face to Face (2023–2026)
- Feast TV (in cooperation with Sheperds Voice Radio and Television) (2020–22)
- Feelings (2020–23)
- MPBL (2022–24)
- MPVA (2023–24)
- One Balita Ngayon (2021–23)
- One Balita (noontime) (2019–20)
- One Balita Pilipinas (primetime) (2019–23)
- Panahon.TV (2019–23)
- POPinoy (2021)
- Punto Asintado (2010–18)
- Rated Korina (2020–23)
- Remoto Control (2012–17)
- Sakto Kay Paolo, Sakto rin Kay Cherie (2010–14)
- Simbang Gabi (in cooperation with Holy Family Parish-Kapitolyo) (2021)
- Todo Balita (2010–13)
- Wil To Win (2024–25)
- Wanted: Ang Serye (2023–25)
- Safe Ka Ba, 2025? (television special, 2025)
- Totoy Bato (2025–26)

== See also ==
- DWLA-FM
- One PH
- AksyonTV
- RPTV
- News5
