= Wanted sa Radyo =

Philippine public affairs show

- Title card since 2026
- Genre: Public service
- Running time: 2 hours (2:00 pm – 4:00 pm)
- Country of origin: Philippines
- Language: Filipino
- Home station: DZXL (1994–2010); DWFM (2010–24); DWLA (2024–present)
- TV adaptations: Wanted (2011–12); Idol in Action (2020–21); Wanted: Ang Serye (2021)
- Hosted by: Raffy Tulfo; Sharee Roman
- Created by: TV5 Network (True FM) (2011–present); Radio Mindanao Network (1994–2011)
- Narrated by: Jupiter Torres (2002–2011); Martin Andanar (2011–2026); Michael Knight "MK" Borricano (2026-present); Mitch Amurao (2022–2025); Archie Zapanta (2025–present)
- Recording studio: DZXL studio, Makati (1994–2010); TV5 Complex, Novaliches, Quezon City (2010–13); TV5 Media Center, Mandaluyong (2013–21; since 2022); Raffy Tulfo Action Center, Quezon City (2021–22)
- Original release: 1994 – present
- No. of episodes: N/A (airs daily)
- Opening theme: Wanted sa Radyo Theme Song by Robster Evangelista (2011–18); Ikaw ang Idol Ko by Janine Baligod and Rusty Loayon (2019–20; 2021–present); Salamat Idol Raffy Tulfo by Still One (2019–20); Raffy Tulfo in Action Theme Song (2020–21); Ikaw ang Idol Ko (Instrumental) (2022)
- Ending theme: Wanted sa Radyo Theme Song by Robster Evangelista (2011–18); Ikaw ang Idol Ko by Janine Baligod and Rusty Loayon (2019–20; 2021–present); Salamat Idol Raffy Tulfo by Still One (2019–20); Raffy Tulfo in Action Theme Song (2020–21); Ikaw ang Idol Ko (Instrumental) (2022)
- Website: http://raffytulfoinaction.com

Wanted sa Radyo (lit. transl. Wanted on Radio) is a Philippine radio public service show broadcast by DZXL, Radyo5 92.3 News FM/Radyo5 92.3 True FM, AksyonTV, One PH, RPTV, TV5, True TV and 105.9 True FM. Originally hosted by Niña Taduran and Raffy Tulfo, it previously aired on DZXL from 1994 to 2010 and Radyo5 92.3 News FM (later Radyo5 92.3 True FM) from 2010 to 2024. The program is currently aired weekdays at 2 pm on 105.9 True FM with a live simulcast on television via One PH and online via livestreaming on the Raffy Tulfo in Action YouTube channel and Facebook page and also one-episode delayed basis on weekdays at 10 pm on RPTV. Tulfo and Sharee Roman currently serve as the hosts. The program is also aired on television via AksyonTV from February 21, 2011 to January 11, 2019, One PH since February 18, 2019, RPTV since February 1, 2024, TV5 from February 21 to April 5, 2024, and True FM TV (later True TV) from May 1, 2024 to August 14, 2026. Whenever Tulfo is absent from the show, mostly due to his duties as a senator, he is filled in by his daughter Maricel Tulfo-Tungol, his son-in-law and chief of staff Atty. Gareth Tungol, his co-parent-in-law Atty. Danilo Tungol, Atty. Blessie Abad, Atty. Gabriel Ilaya, Atty. Ina Magpale, Atty. Gail Dela Cruz, Atty. Joren Tan, Atty. Freddie Villamor, Atty. Jethro Aramis King, Atty. Pau Cruz, Atty. Paul Castillo, Atty. JV Bernardez (legal counsel of ACT-CIS Partylist), Marsh Salcedo, Rhoanne Torres, or Rio Angeles.

== History ==
=== DZXL (1994–2010) ===
Wanted sa Radyo first aired on DZXL-AM from 1994 to 2010. Raffy Tulfo and Niña Taduran hosted the program.

=== DWFM (2010–2024) ===
Wanted sa Radyo transferred to the newly-launched Radyo5 92.3 News FM (later True FM) in 2010, while retaining Raffy Tulfo and Niña Taduran as its hosts with the same airtime from 2:00 p.m. to 4:00 p.m.

Its television simulcast began on February 21, 2011, on AksyonTV, which was launched on the same day. From January to May 29, 2012, the show used to temporarily air for one hour from 12:30 p.m. to 1:30 p.m. whenever Radyo5 and AksyonTV aired the News5 coverage of the impeachment trial of then-Chief Justice Renato Corona at 1:30 p.m. onwards. On December 23, 2013, the Radyo5 studios used by the show moved from the TV5 Studio Complex in Novaliches, Quezon City to TV5 Media Center in Mandaluyong.

On October 15, 2018, Niña Taduran left the show to run for party-list representative for ACT-CIS Partylist in 2019. She was replaced by Sharee Roman. The TV simulcast was carried over to One PH on January 12, 2019, when AksyonTV was rebranded as 5 Plus.

From October 18, 2021, the show moved from TV5 Media Center to its new studio at the Raffy Tulfo Action Center in Quezon City and it went online-only where it is exclusively livestreamed on "Raffy Tulfo in Action" YouTube channel. Replay episodes were being aired until October 20, 2021, on their regular timeslot on Radyo5 92.3 News FM and One PH before live broadcasts resumed on the next day. An online-only hour-long extended edition of the show was also launched on the same day.

On February 8, 2022, Tulfo took a leave from the show to focus on his Senate campaign; he returned to the show on May 10. The show still continues streaming online even if Radyo5 and One PH air a One News special coverage.

On August 12, 2022, Tulfo revealed that the show would return to the TV5 Media Center starting August 15. As a result, it reverted to its regular two-hour timeslot. The hour-long online-exclusive extended edition was moved to 6:00–7:00 p.m., this time re-titled as RTIA: Bardagulan Serye with Roman and Maricel Tulfo-Tungol as hosts; it later returned airing from 4:00 to 5:00 p.m.

On February 1, 2024, the program began airing on the newly launched RPTV as a simulcast. It later extended its simulcast to TV5 from February 21 to April 5, 2024, with the simulcast's last 30 minutes preempted by Diary of a Prosecutor beginning March 11. Both simulcasts' first 30 minutes were preempted by Eat Bulaga!. On April 29, 2024, its RPTV broadcast was moved to an earlier timeslot at 10:00 am as a lead-in program for Eat Bulaga!, extending its airtime to two hours through a replay of its latest episode. On July 15, 2024, it was shortened to 90 minutes as its last 30 minutes were preempted by the replay of the revived Frontline Express AM. During the 2024 and 2025 NBA conference finals and Finals, the program's replay on RPTV was frequently adjusted, often cut to 30, 60, or 90 minutes between 8:00 a.m. and 12:00 p.m., or entirely preempted to accommodate the live coverage.

=== DWLA (2024–present) ===
On October 30, 2024, the program aired its last episode on DWFM 92.3 before the Allhallowtide break, as True FM would transfer to DWLA 105.9, effective November 4. This follows TV5 Network's FM realignment, after Philippine Collective Media Corporation (PCMC) agreed on October 26 to lease the frequency and buy most of NBC/MediaQuest's radio stations, except those based in Cebu and Cagayan de Oro.

== Format ==
The show investigates and exposes cases of abuse, dishonesty, exploitation, and family disputes ("Sumbong at Aksyon"), as well as recognizes ordinary people who return items of value that they find in their course of work ("Solian ng Bayan"). The show regularly emphasizes Tulfo's no-nonsense approach and interrogation, sometimes laced with profanity.

The most common feature of the show is "Sumbong at Aksyon," where complainants share their situation with Tulfo and seek assistance. Tulfo contacts the other party to get their side and encourages both parties to discuss the issue on air. Occasionally, Tulfo concludes that the complainant is at fault and may refuse further assistance. In rare cases, he may take action against the complainant, such as referring them to the police and filing charges. After hearing both sides, Tulfo may contact relevant authorities, like high-ranking police officials or social workers, to assist the aggrieved party. The show typically features four sets of complainants, and lengthy discussions may be continued off-air if time runs out.

The final show of each month begins with an awarding ceremony featuring people who returned items to their owners in the "Solian ng Bayan" segments aired throughout the month. The awardees receive a medal, plaque, cash reward, and items from the sponsors; these are in addition to the cash reward and items received during the "Solian ng Bayan" segment in which they appeared.

=== Internet and social media ===
On July 4, 2016, Wanted sa Radyo launched a website entitled "Raffy Tulfo in Action", which features the cases featured in WSR and also cases in the spin-off segment Itimbre Mo kay Tulfo on Aksyon sa Tanghali and Idol in Action. The show's video feed is simulcast over Radyo5's Facebook page and a copy of the day's show is also posted on the "Raffy Tulfo in Action" YouTube channel. The social media accounts contain video clips that feature how some of the cases were resolved, as well as how the off-air conversations between the parties have gone.

== Spin-off television series ==
From January 28, 2011, to July 30, 2012, Wanted, a public affairs program acting as an extension and TV version of Wanted sa Radyo, was aired every Monday at 11:30pm–12:00am on TV5. AksyonTV aired its producer's cut from February 21, 2011, to January 11, 2019. The set was different, with Tulfo sitting comfortably in a radio booth setting. Respondents and interviewees are videotaped while they are on the phone with him. From June 8, 2020, to October 1, 2021, it was replaced by Idol in Action, which is similar to Wanted.

Wanted: Ang Serye, a docu-drama anthology and another extension of Wanted, premiered on January 16, 2021, on TV5. Presented by Cignal Entertainment and JCB Entertainment Productions, it is also hosted by Tulfo. The program dramatizes true stories based on complaints brought to Raffy Tulfo in Action. After its most recent episode was aired on May 1, 2021, it took a "season break". It returned on June 27 in a new timeslot. The show ended on August 1, 2021.

== Controversies ==
=== Jee Ick-Joo's abduction and killing ===
On October 21, 2016, a complainant named alias "Joy" was exalted to WSR that her employee South Korean businessman named Jee Ick-Joo was kidnapped by a policeman identified as SPO3 Richard "Ricky" Sta. Isabel, due to alleged involvement of illegal drugs on October 18 in Angeles, Pampanga, the maid and Jee were sent to Quezon City and eventually separated at Camp Crame, and that night when they separated Jee was killed in nearby White House, the residence of the Philippine National Police Chief, incidentally Gen. Ronald dela Rosa was in Beijing accompanied by President Rodrigo Duterte on his State Visit.

=== Political involvement ===
Raffy Tulfo and his siblings are staunch supporters of President Rodrigo Duterte's policies. During the 2019 elections, he and Erwin acquired ACT-CIS Partylist from former Representative Samuel Pagdilao, Jr. and nominated Erwin's Chief of Staff Eric Go Yap, Raffy's wife Jocelyn Tulfo, and co-host Niña Taduran, while Ramon, Wanda, and Ben declined to participate. ACT-CIS took the top position with 2.6 million votes, earning the maximum of three seats at the 18th Congress. One of the campaign strategies is inserting the ACT-CIS logo into the Raffy Tulfo in Action social media pages, as RTIA was only a blocktimer on Radyo5 92.3 News FM.
