= Mon Gualvez =

Filipino broadcaster

- Born: Mon Argel Gualvez; March 10, 1990 (age 36); Sampaloc, Manila, Philippines
- Other name: Pambansang Good Boy (English: National Good Boy)
- Education: University of Santo Tomas (AB Communication)
- Occupation: Journalist
- Years active: 2011–present
- Agent: TV5 (2011–present)

Mon Argel Gualvez (Tagalog: [mɔn ˈgwalbɛs]; born March 10, 1990) is a Filipino broadcast journalist and former student leader. He produces several shows on TV5, News5, 105.9 True FM, One PH and One News. He is also the continuity voice over talent of One PH.

== Background ==
Gualvez studied at Holy Trinity Academy in Manila and graduated salutatorian and valedictorian for elementary and high school, respectively. He was a student leader in his college years and graduated AB Communication Magna cum laude from the University of Santo Tomas in 2011, and was also awarded the university's Quezon Leadership Award and Benavides Award.

In February 2023, famous Filipino comedy page @kblstgn posted a video of Gualvez' report on Twitter where he mentioned "Otin" several times. "Otin" is another Filipino term for penis.

== Recognition ==
Gualvez was awarded Best Field Reporter by the KBP Golden Dove Awards in 2016 for his work in TV5.

== Selected shows ==
Year	Title	Role
2024	Budol Alert	Co-host
2023–24	Bangon Bayan with Mon	Anchor
2022–23	One Balita Weekend	Anchor
2021–present	Alagang Kapatid	Host
2021–present	Frontline Pilipinas	Reporter
2020	Bagong Gawi	Host
2020	One Balita Ngayon	Anchor
2020	Alternative Learning System Programming	Teacher
2018	Shop TV	Host
