= Ted Failon at DJ Chacha sa True FM =

Philippine radio news commentary and public affairs program

- Title card
- Other names: Ted Failon at DJ Chacha sa Radyo5 (2020–2024); Ted Failon at DJ Chacha
- Genre: News, Public affairs, Commentary, Entertainment
- Running time: 4 hours (6:00 am – 10:00 am)
- Country of origin: Philippines
- Languages: Tagalog, English
- Home station: DWFM (2020–2024); DWLA (2024–present)
- TV adaptations: TV5 (6:30 AM – 7:00 AM); RPTV/Kapatid Channel (partial broadcast); One PH (full broadcast)
- Hosted by: Ted Failon; DJ Chacha (Czarina Guevara)
- Created by: TV5 Network; Nation Broadcasting Corporation (TV5 News)
- Recording studio: TV5 Media Center, Mandaluyong City, Metro Manila, Philippines
- Original release: October 5, 2020 – present
- No. of episodes: N/A (airs daily)
- Website: news.tv5.com.ph

Ted Failon at DJ Chacha sa True FM (transl. Ted Failon and DJ Chacha on True FM), formerly known as Ted Failon at DJ Chacha sa Radyo5 and also known as simply Ted Failon at DJ Chacha, is a Philippine radio news and commentary produced by TV5 News and Nation Broadcasting Corporation. Hosted by Ted Failon and DJ Chacha (Czarina Balba-Guevara). It aired on Radyo5 92.3 News FM (later 92.3 Radyo5 True FM and 105.9 True FM) and One PH since October 5, 2020. It also aired on TV5 from October 5, 2020 to February 19, 2021, and from October 4, 2021 to May 3, 2024.

The show broadcasts live on weekday mornings from 6:00 AM to 10:00 AM PST on 105.9 True FM and 92.3 FMR in Metro Manila, with nationwide radio relay stations and affiliates, a visual television simulcast on TV5, Kapatid Channel, One PH, RPTV and online streaming platforms.

== History ==
=== Conceptualization and launch ===
Following the non-renewal of the ABS-CBN broadcast franchise on May 5, 2020, veteran news anchor Ted Failon concluded his 30-year career with ABS-CBN, where he previously anchored Failon Ngayon sa DZMM (later Failon Ngayon sa TeleRadyo). Shortly thereafter, Failon signed a broadcast contract with TV5 Network and News5 to anchor a new morning commentary and public affairs slot.

Failon was paired with Czarina Guevara, widely known as DJ Chacha, who had previously served as a prominent radio host on ABS-CBN's FM radio station, MOR 101.9. The duo officially debuted on October 5, 2020, under the title Ted Failon at DJ Chacha sa Radyo5, broadcasting simultaneously on Radyo5 92.3 News FM (later True FM), One PH, and partially on TV5. Until September 29, 2023, its newscast segment was called Radyo5 Network News, before becoming a separate program until it was later replaced by the program's News5 segment.

On January 1, 2024, it began airing on One News, lasting until March 27. On February 1, 2024, the program began simulcasting on the newly launched RPTV as its inaugural broadcast. Meanwhile, after its simulcast's duration on TV5 was reduced from its first 90 down to 30 minutes, its run on the network ended on May 3, 2024.

=== Station migration and rebranding ===
In late 2024, following TV5 Network's realignment of its FM radio frequencies and the rebranding of its flagship station from DWFM 92.3 to DWLA 105.9 True FM, the show adopted its updated title, Ted Failon at DJ Chacha sa True FM.

On October 21, 2024, the program's first newscast segment, care of News5 (later known as TV5 News), began simulcasting as part of Gud Morning Kapatid on TV5, marking the show's return to the network after a few months, and RPTV. Consequently, its first two hours on RPTV were pre-empted by the morning show, reducing its standalone simulcast to two hours starting at 8:00 AM. This format was carried over to the third incarnation of Frontline sa Umaga, which replaced Gud Morning Kapatid on August 10, 2026.

On November 9, 2026, the program began simulcasting on 92.3 FMR, marking its return to the DWFM frequency after the station was rebranded in 2024 following its lease to Philippine Collective Media Corporation. Most other FMR provincial stations are not affected as it simulcasts ABS-CBN News-produced morning programs from sister AM station DZMM Radyo Patrol 630.

== Format ==
The program features news commentary, public service segments, investigative reporting, and lifestyle discussion between its hosts:

- Headliners / Executive Summary: A detailed breakdown of major national news, economic developments, and political updates.
- Think About It: Analytical commentary led by Ted Failon covering press issues, policy decisions, and social concerns in the Philippines.
- Sino? / Hula-Hula: Lighthearted interactive segments covering social trends, pop culture, and humor between the co-hosts.
- Public Assistance & Legal Affairs: Segments facilitating direct aid and guidance to citizens by connecting them with relevant government agencies and legal experts.

== Presenters ==
- Ted Failon (2020–present)
- DJ Chacha (Czarina Guevara) (2020–present)

=== Substitute hosts ===
- Lourd de Veyra
- Angela Lagunzad-Castro
- Nikki de Guzman
- Maricel Halili
- DJ Popoy (Arnold Rei)
- Ruth Cabal
- Mon Gualvez

== Broadcast outlets ==
=== Current ===
- Radio: 105.9 True FM (Metro Manila), regional True FM affiliate stations nationwide and 92.3 FMR (Metro Manila and select provincial relays)
- Television: TV5 (simulcast from 6:30 AM to 7:00 AM via Frontline sa Umaga), Kapatid Channel (partial broadcast), RPTV (partial broadcast) and One PH (full broadcast)
- Online: Live streaming via TV5 News and True FM official YouTube and Facebook pages

=== Former ===
- Radio: Radyo5 92.3 News FM/92.3 Radyo5 True FM (2020–24; Metro Manila)
- Television: One News (2024), True TV (2024–26)

== See also ==
- News5
- TV5 Network
- One PH
- DWLA-FM
- Gud Morning Kapatid
