= Frontline Pilipinas =

Philippine television news show

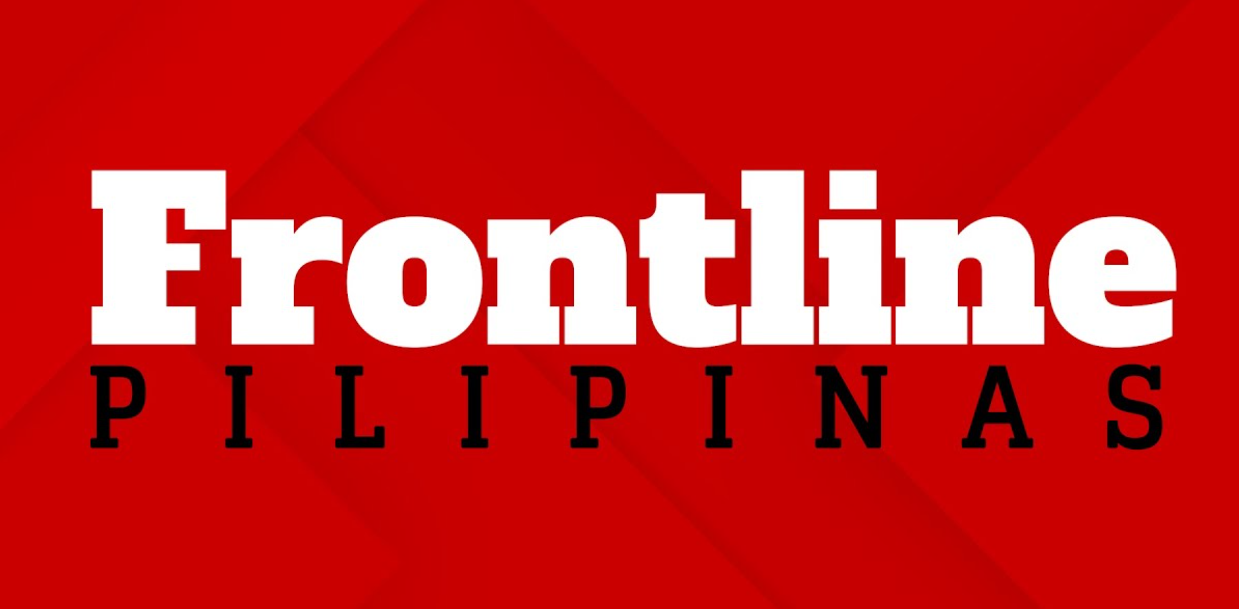
- Title card since 2025
- Genre: Newscast; Live television
- Created by: TV5 Network
- Directed by: Benedict Carlos
- Presented by: Cheryl Cosim; Julius Babao; KaladKaren
- Narrated by: Raffy Tulfo (2020–21); Cheryl Cosim (2021–25); Mon Gualvez (since 2024)
- Theme music composer: Michael Llave (2020–25); Jimmy Antiporda (since 2025)
- Opening theme: "Frontline Pilipinas" theme music (2020–25); "Aksyon" theme music (2010–17 arrangement; since 2025)
- Country of origin: Philippines
- Original language: Tagalog

Production
- Executive producer: Ryan Juego
- Production locations: TV5 News (formerly News5) Studio, TV5 Media Center, Mandaluyong City, Metro Manila, Philippines
- Camera setup: Multiple-camera setup
- Running time: 90 minutes (early-night weeknights); 60 minutes (weekend edition); 45 minutes (weekdays afternoons, late-night weeknights (except Wednesdays), Saturday afternoons); 30 minutes (late-morning weekdays, Una sa Lahat, Wednesday late-night); 150 minutes (early-morning weekdays)
- Production company: TV5 News

Original release
- Network: TV5 (Note: The newscast is also broadcast on One PH and RPTV.)
- Release: October 5, 2020 – present

Related
- One Balita Pilipinas; The Big Story; News Night; CNN Philippines Newsroom; Balitaan; CNN Philippines Network News

Frontline Pilipinas (lit. 'Frontline Philippines') is a Philippine television news broadcasting show broadcast by TV5, with simulcast on RPTV since 2024. Originally anchored by Raffy Tulfo and Cheryl Cosim, it premiered on October 5, 2020, replacing Aksyon. Cosim and Julius Babao currently serve as the Main Anchors.

== History ==
=== 2020–2021: Tulfo-Cosim era ===
Frontline Pilipinas premiered on October 5, 2020, at 6:30 pm PHT with Raffy Tulfo and Cheryl Cosim as original anchors, along with former News5 (now TV5 News) chief Luchi Cruz-Valdes, News5 (now tv5 news) and One News' chief correspondent Ed Lingao, and Lourd de Veyra as segment anchors for Deretsahan, NEWS ExplainED, and Word of the Lourd, respectively. The program serves as the replacement to TV5's longest-running flagship newscast Aksyon, which ended abruptly on March 16, 2020, due to the COVID-19 pandemic and the enforcement of enhanced community quarantine in Luzon, as well as the simulcast of two One-branded newscasts (One News Now of One News and One PH's One Balita Pilipinas) on TV5. The following week, the program moved to 6:00 PM timeslot to give way for the 2020 PBA Philippine Cup and new primetime programming.

On February 15, 2021, athlete and TV host Gretchen Ho joined the newscast as "Sports" segment anchor (alongside joining The Big Story on One News). On February 22, 2021, the program extended its running time to one hour and 15 minutes as part of TV5's programming changes.

==== Tulfo's departure ====
On October 1, 2021, Raffy Tulfo bid farewell to the newscast to run for senator in 2022.

Julius Babao was named as Tulfo's replacement, joining the newscast on February 7, 2022. In conjunction with this, Frontline Pilipinas also debuted its new opening billboard, title card, and graphics. Babao was originally to make his debut on January 17, but was postponed due to the increasing number of COVID-19 cases brought by the omicron variant. Ed Lingao and Paolo Bediones took over as interim anchors of the newscast. On May 22, 2023, the newscast was extended to 90 minutes.

KaladKaren and Mikee Reyes

KaladKaren and Mikee Reyes joined TV5’s flagship primetime newscast in June 2023

KaladKaren (Jervi Wrightson) serves as the entertainment and showbiz news presenter (Showbiz Eto Na Nga! and K-alaman), making history as the first prominent transgender news anchor in Philippine television.

Mikee Reyes served as the sports news presenter ("Sports Tito Mikee Reyes"). He officially announced his resignation from the program in January 2025 after a year and a half with News5.

On January 8, 2024, Jiggy Manicad joined the newscast, becoming its first third main anchor. It also marked his return to journalism, after a nearly six-year hiatus.

From March 8, 2025, beginning with its weekend edition, all of the newscast's edition (with exception of News5 Alerts (now Frontline Alerts) until June 8, 2025) silently dropped its original theme music and began adopting the composition used by its predecessor program Aksyon from 2010 to 2017 throughout its broadcasts for unknown reasons, sharing the music with TV5's affiliate in Zamboanga City for its regional newscast Dateline Zamboanga.

A week later, the newscast transitioned to a temporary studio set, as its current news studio underwent renovations in preparation for the Bilang Pilipino 2025 mid-term election coverage. On April 29, the graphics were updated, starting with the morning edition of Frontline Express. On May 10, the newscast returned to its newly renovated News5 Studio, ahead of the Bilang Pilipino 2025 midterm election coverage. The same day also marked the rollout of updated graphics.

On May 16, Manicad made his final appearance on the newscast to become the anchor of its lead-in, Una sa Lahat, previously a segment of the newscast. On May 19, it was shortened to 45 minutes to make way for Una sa Lahat and Ang Mutya ng Section E. Beginning August 25, Babao took a leave from the newscast amid an investigation into the Discaya interviews; various male anchors rotated to fill his spot. Until Babao return Then, from September 29, 2025, to January 1, 2026, it was expanded to an hour due to primetime programming changes. Beginning January 2 to September 4, 2026, Frontline Pilipinas was expanded to 1 hour and 45 minutes, following the end of the 5-year content partnership with ABS-CBN to air its primetime programs. It was then temporarily shortened to 1 hour and 15 minutes from September 7 to October 16, 2026; Una sa Lahat was temporarily shortened to 15 minutes. Then, starting October 19, 2026, after the rerun of Minute to Win It has ended, Una sa Lahat is lengthened to 30 minutes and airs from 6:00 PM to 6:30 PM, followed by Frontline Pilipinas, which is also lengthened to 90 minutes and airs from 6:30 PM to 8:00 PM, to rival two other primetime newscasts, TV Patrol and 24 Oras.

== Newscast editions ==
=== Frontline Sa Umaga (Morning Edition) ===
Frontline sa Umaga (lit. transl. Frontline in the Morning), a morning edition of Frontline Pilipinas, aired on TV5 from May 10, 2021, to June 16, 2023, with Paolo Bediones and Marga Vargas as its original anchors. It is currently anchored by Ed Lingao, Dimples Romana, Andrei Felix, and Angela Lagunzad-Castro, with segments hosted by Maoui David, Chiqui Roa-Puno, and Ted Failon at DJ Chacha sa True FM anchors Ted Failon and Czarina "DJ Chacha" Guevara. The newscast was revived as a standalone show for a third time on August 10, 2026.

=== Frontline Express (AM and PM Edition) ===
A fast-paced newscast premiered on April 8, 2024. Its main anchors are Ruth Cabral (weekday afternoons) and Nikki de Guzman (weekday mornings and Saturday afternoons).

=== Frontline Tonight (Late Night Edition) ===
A late night newscast premiered on September 27, 2021 replacing Aksyon Tonite. with Ed Lingao and Maeanne Los Baños as its original anchors. Los Baños and Lourd de Veyra. currently serve as the anchors.

=== Frontline Pilipinas Weekend (Weekend Edition) ===
On July 20, 2025, its Sunday edition was shortened to 15 minutes and aired from 5:50 pm to 6:05 pm due to the delayed broadcast of Pacquiao vs. Barrios earlier that day.Frontline Pilipinas Weekend is currently anchored by Nikki de Guzman and Andrei Felix.

=== Frontline Alerts (News Bulletin) ===
Frontline Alerts (formerly News5 Alerts) is a news bulletin aired on TV5 launched on October 6, 2020, anchored by various TV5 News anchors. Currently it is airing on Sundays. Before the launch of Frontline Express, it airs daily on mid-mornings and mid-afternoons.

== Accolades ==
Frontline Pilipinas received nominations for Best News Program and Best Female Newscaster (Cosim) at the 35th PMPC Star Awards for Television.
