= Andar ng mga Balita =

Andar ng mga Balita could refer to the following newscasts anchored by Martin Andanar:

- Andar ng mga Balita (radio), a radio newscast
- Andar ng mga Balita (TV newscast), a television newscast
