= Ed Lingao =

Filipino broadcast and investigative journalist

- Born: Eduardo D. Lingao; November 20, 1976 (age 49)
- Education: University of the Philippines Diliman
- Occupations: Journalist; investigative reporter; war correspondent; news anchor
- Years active: 1987–present
- Television: Wag Po!, The Chiefs, Frontline sa Umaga, "Showbiz Lingao"
- Spouse: Esther Lingao
- Children: 1
- Awards: Marshall McLuhan Fellowship (2010); Titus Brandsma Leadership in Journalism Award (2019)

Eduardo D. Lingao (born November 20, 1976) is a Filipino broadcast journalist, investigative reporter, war correspondent and news anchor. He has worked across print, television, and online platforms.

== Early life and education ==
Lingao completed his Journalism degree at the University of the Philippines College of Mass Communication in 1988. He was a student during the 1986 People Power Revolution, an event he has said influenced his worldview and his approach to journalism.

== Career ==
=== Print journalism beginnings ===
Lingao began his career in print journalism with The Manila Chronicle in 1987. He joined The Manila Times as a reporter in 1989. In 1992, he had a brief stint in broadcasting with SkyCable News before returning to The Manila Times in 1998 to take on editorial roles until the temporary closure of the newspaper outfit.

=== Broadcast and war correspondence ===
Lingao moved into broadcast journalism with ABS-CBN Integrated News & Current Affairs. Through his work on The Correspondents, he has covered numerous local conflict zones, including clashes between military forces and rebel groups in Mindanao, as well as international conflicts such as the wars in Iraq and Afghanistan. He has also reported on high-risk political and security events, including the Oakwood Mutiny.

Lingao subsequently took on the role of manager of ABC‑5 News Operations.

=== Multimedia and investigative journalism ===
In 2009, Lingao joined the Philippine Center for Investigative Journalism (PCIJ) as Multimedia Director, where he oversaw the integration of print, broadcast, and digital platforms for investigative reporting. He produced in-depth documentaries and investigative pieces on topics including governance, electoral reforms, human rights, policing, military affairs, and corruption. One of his significant investigative works involved the aftermath of the Maguindanao massacre, exploring the political power dynamics of the Ampatuan clan.

=== Return to broadcasting ===
Beginning in 2014, Lingao returned to broadcast media, working with TV5 and OneNews. Among his notable shows are Wag Po!, a social commentary talk show that he co-hosted, and The Chiefs, a current affairs program. He currently anchors late-night newscast Frontline Tonight and primetime news program Storycon.

== Personal life ==
Lingao and wife, Esther, launched the Laptop Project, which donates laptops to students in remote areas, inspired partly by their daughter, Elizabeth or Ellie, who died from an aneurysm in 2017.

He has been nicknamed "Grass Man" or "Damong Lingao" within the PCIJ due to his fondness for military-green attire and frequent field assignments.

== Awards and recognition ==
In 2010, Lingao was awarded the Marshall McLuhan Fellowship, one of the most prestigious recognitions for Philippine journalists. In 2012, he was conferred the University of the Philippines Alumni Association Distinguished Alumnus Award for his contributions to journalism. He was honored with the Center for Media Freedom and Responsibility Award of Distinction in 2016 for his contributions to media freedom and responsibility. Lingao later received the Titus Brandsma Leadership in Journalism Award in 2019 for his three decades of work across multiple media forms. In 2017, he was honored with the Glory Medal of Distinction by his alma mater, the University of the Philippines College of Mass Communication. In 2022, he was named one of People Asia Magazine’s Men Who Matter awardees.
