= Agenda with Cito Beltran =

Philippine television program

- Genre: Talk show
- Created by: Cignal TV
- Presented by: Cito Beltran
- Opening theme: One News theme
- Country of origin: Philippines
- Original language: English

Production
- Production locations: TV5 Media Center, Reliance cor. Sheridan Sts., Mandaluyong
- Camera setup: Multiple-camera setup
- Running time: 60–90 minutes
- Production company: News5

Original release
- Network: One News (2018–2023); TV5 (2019–2020)
- Release: May 28, 2018 – December 29, 2023

Agenda with Cito Beltran is a Philippine television talk show broadcast by One News, hosted by Cito Beltran. It aired from May 28, 2018 to December 29, 2023, and was replaced by the Radyo5 (Now 105.9 True FM) simulcast of Ted Failon at DJ Chacha sa Radyo5 (late Ted Failon at DJ Chacha sa True FM). It airs every weekdays at 8:00 AM (PST).

The program was also aired on TV5 via same-day delayed telecast at 10:30 PM, later moved as next-day broadcast at 6:00 AM from March 4, 2019 to March 16, 2020. Due to COVID-19 pandemic, the show's broadcast on TV5 went on-hiatus and later removed on the network's programming.

== Host ==
- Cito Beltran

== Segments ==
- Opening Shot
- Experts and Pros
- TLC: Tweets, Likes, & Comments
- Today's Agenda

== See also ==
- One News
- Straight from the Shoulder
