= Andar ng mga Balita (TV program) =

- Created by: ABC Development Corporation; Nation Broadcasting Corporation
- Developed by: News5
- Directed by: Benedict Carlos
- Presented by: Martin Andanar; Chi Bocobo
- Country of origin: Philippines
- Original language: Tagalog
- No. of episodes: n/a (airs daily)

Production
- Executive producer: Eric Montas
- Running time: 60 minutes Monday to Friday at 11:00 (PST)

Original release
- Network: AksyonTV
- Release: February 21, 2011 – July 11, 2014

Related
- Balitang 60 (as weekend newscast)

Andar ng mga Balita (lit. Movement of the News) was a Philippine television newscast of AksyonTV. Originally anchored by Martin Andanar, it aired from February 21, 2011, to July 11, 2014. Andanar and Chi Bocobo served as the final anchors.

== History ==
Logo used from February 21, 2011, to July 5, 2013

The newscast premiered on February 21, 2011 at 18:30 Philippine Standard Time, with Martin Andanar as its sole anchor, serving as lead-out programming for AksyonTV's simulcast of its namesake flagship newscast from TV5.

Its weekend edition aired on February 26–27, 2011 with Jove Francisco and Chi Bocobo as co-anchors. However, it was replaced by Balitang 60 on March 5, 2011.

On October 1, 2012, the newscast was moved to a later 9:00 pm slot while its format was kept and Grace Lee was added as co-anchor.

On February 4, 2013, former beauty queen and lawyer Anna Theresa Licaros became Grace Lee's replacement as she was moved to Aksyon Weekend.

On June 3, 2013, Andar ng Mga Balita revamped to a more formal style and moved to the 11:00 a.m slot. after Aksyon Solusyon (later Bitag Live) as AksyonTV gave way to its sports programming on primetime. This arrangement would last until July 11, 2014 when Andar ng mga Balita aired its final broadcast ahead of News5's rollout of a unified Aksyon which began on July 14.

== Format ==
Andar ng Mga Balita was based on the early-morning radio newscast of the same title hosted by Andanar on Radyo5 92.3 News FM, airing at 4:00 AM and featuring a fast-paced, tabloidish vocabulary and interactive segments.

The TV adjunct served as a considerable departure from the more formal style and vocabulary of Aksyon as it originally incorporated radio-styled sound effects and a looser, more uninhibited presentation with behind the scenes and master control staff participating in light banter, humorous items and a brief airtime to dance during the show's end credits.

Andar Ng Mga Balita discontinued its original format in 2013 but gained technological equipment and presentation, delivered through augmented reality graphics from the all new Orad-based graphics engine.

== Final anchors ==
- Martin Andanar (2011–14)
- Chi Bocobo (2014)

=== Final segment presenters ===
- MJ Marfori (2011–14, Celebrity Hot Stuff)
- Joseph Ubalde (2011–14, N5E)
- Danton Remoto (2013–14, Remoto Control)

=== Substitute anchors ===
- Amelyn Veloso
- Maricel Halili

=== Former anchors ===
- Anna Theresa Licaros (2013–14)
- Grace Lee (2012–13)

=== Former segment presenters ===
- Benjie "TsongkiBenj" Felipe (2011–13, Kasindak-sindak!)

== Segments ==
- N5E – News found at News5.com.ph
- Police Reports
- Celebrity Hot Stuff
- Remoto Control
- Weather
- Sports

== See also ==
- News5
- AksyonTV
- Andar ng mga Balita (radio)
- One Balita Pilipinas
