= Pamintuan =

Pamintuan is a Kapampangan language surname meaning "to obey", "to serve" or "to give service to". Notable people with the surname include:

- Edgardo Pamintuan Sr. (born 1949), Filipino lawyer and politician
- Edu Pamintuan, Filipino politician
- Mariel Pamintuan (born 1998), Filipino actress
- Amy Pamintuan, Filipino journalist
- Marlo Mortel (born 1993), Filipino actor, TV host, musician, entrepreneur, and singer-songwriter
- Carlos Celdran (1972–2019), Filipino artist, tour guide, segment TV host and cultural activist
- Nicolasa Pamintuan Dayrit-Panlilio (1874–1945), Filipina non-combatant in the Philippine–American War
