= Gretchen Ho =

Filipino volleyball player and TV presenter

- 何美霖
- Born: Gretchen Ong Ho; April 19, 1990 (age 36); Manila, Philippines
- Education: Ateneo de Manila University (BS and AB)
- Occupations: Television host; broadcaster; former volleyball player; businesswoman
- Years active: 2010–present
- Agent(s): ABS-CBN (2013–2020; 2026–present); TV5 (2020–2026); Star Magic (2014–present); Cornerstone Talent Management Center (2013–present); ALLTV2 (2026–present)
- Volleyball career

Personal information
- Height: 1.72 m (5 ft 8 in)
- Education: Ateneo de Manila University (2008–2013)

Volleyball information
- Position: Middle Blocker / Open Spiker

Career
Years	Teams
2013–2015	Petron Blaze Spikers
- Website: womaninaction.ph

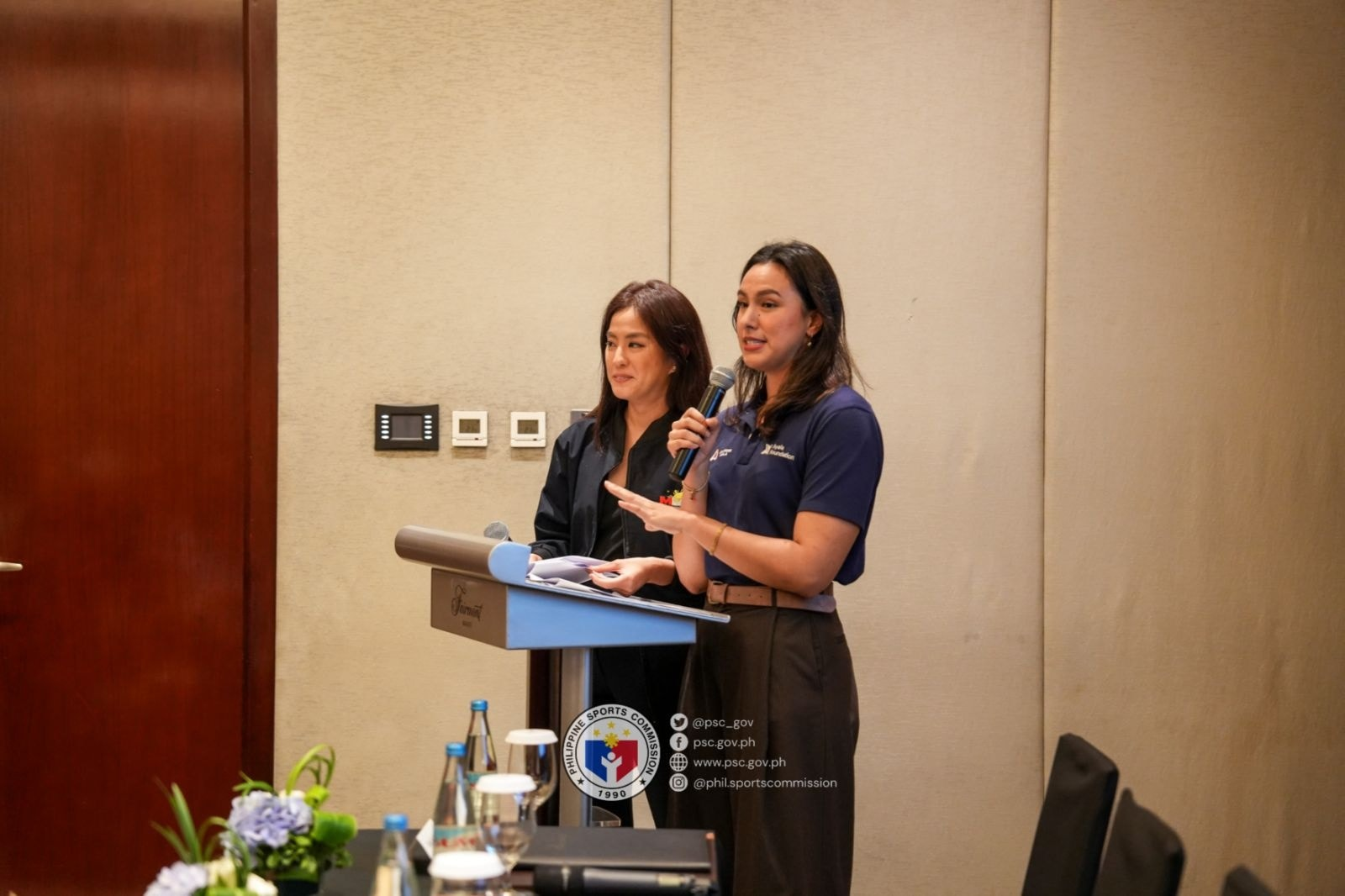
Gretchen Ho and Jasmine Alkhaldi

Gretchen Ong Ho (Tagalog: [ˈgrɛtʃɛn ʔɔŋ ho]; born April 19, 1990) is a Filipino broadcaster, journalist, television presenter and former volleyball player. She played collegiate volleyball for the Ateneo Lady Eagles from 2008 to 2013, helping the team earn their first back-to-back UAAP finals appearances (seasons 74 and 75). She then played professionally for the Petron Blaze Spikers in the Philippine Super Liga (PSL) from 2013 to 2015, where she helped the team win the 2014 Grand Prix Conference.

== Personal life ==
Gretchen Ong Ho was born on April 19, 1990 in Manila, Philippines, to James and Annie Ho. She is the only daughter among four siblings.

Ho was previously in a relationship with host and actor Robi Domingo from 2012 to 2017.

== Career ==
=== Volleyball ===
She played varsity volleyball in high school for Immaculate Conception Academy-Greenhills. While in college, she played for Ateneo De Manila University for 5 years. She also played professional volleyball for two years, suiting up for the Petron Trail Blazers in the Philippine Super Liga from 2013 to 2015, as well as the PSL Beach Volleyball Cup in 2015. She is one of the co-founders of Beach Volleyball Republic.

=== Clubs ===
- (Philippines) Petron Blaze Spikers (2013–2015)

== Journalism ==
Having earned a double degree in BS Management Engineering and AB Communications, and a minor in Development Management from Ateneo de Manila University, Ho moved to television work. She debuted as one of the hosts of Gameday Weekend, a sports magazine show on Balls and ABS-CBN Sports+Action. She previously worked as an anchor, segment host, and field reporter for various ABS-CBN programs, such as Umagang Kay Ganda, TV Patrol, News Patrol, The Score, and University Town.

On January 26, 2021, Ho officially transferred to TV5 after 7 years on ABS-CBN as part of its retrenchment program caused by the ABS-CBN shutdown from the Philippine Congress that junked the new ABS-CBN legislative franchise to operate.

In September 2022, Ho started producing her own travel, documentary and public service program called Woman In Action. She hosts and co-writes the program that airs on One News, One PH and TV5. Woman In Action won "Best Public Affairs Program" at the PMAP Makatao Awards in 2023.

In 2025, Ho was recognized by the Global South World as one of the Top 50 most influential journalists on TikTok in Southeast Asia.

== Advocacy and issues ==
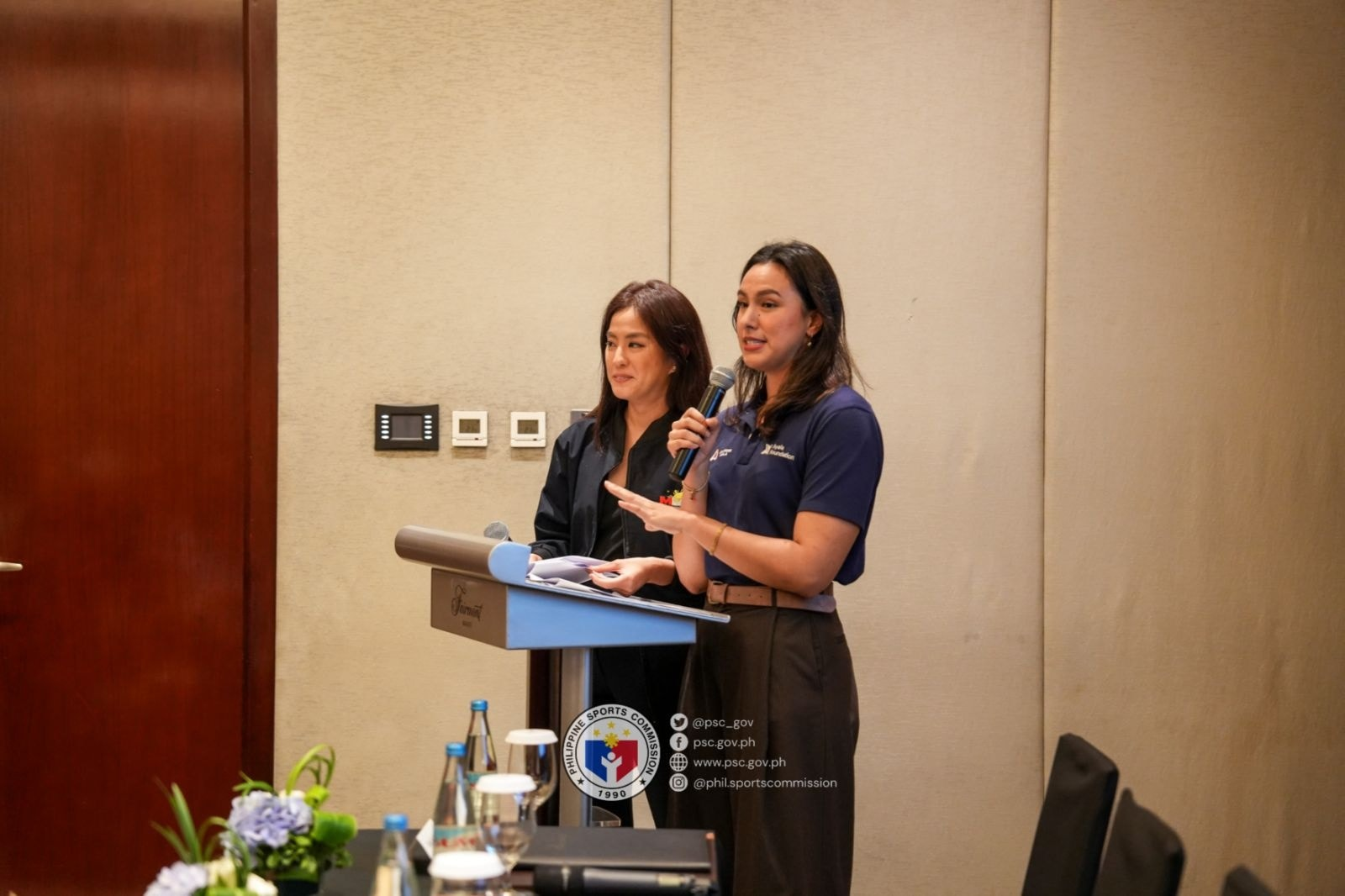
Ho with Jasmine Alkhaldi in 2025

On May 22, 2017, Ho became an Ambassador for Health and Nutrition of the Philippine branch of the humanitarian aid, development, and advocacy organization World Vision.

Ho has also spoken out publicly on various social issues. In 2018 she spoke out about the importance of freedom, saying "That's the media's responsibility in a democracy: to keep power in check." In 2020 she added her voice to the many others who asked for the government to unveil concrete plans to fight the COVID-19 pandemic in the Philippines.

On April 19, 2020, Ho launched her own brand and online platform, Woman In Action, with an article titled, "COVID19: My Birthday Eve". According to her, she created the website to create a "safe space" where she and anyone else can share their stories. "In this time of the COVID-19 crisis, we'd like to share more #happinews to the world. Let's all help uplift each other's spirits," Ho wrote on the website.

Under "Woman In Action", Ho started her "Donate A Bike, Save A Job" campaign, providing more than 1000 bicycles to the most vulnerable during the COVID-19 pandemic. The bikes were distributed to 10 cities all over Metro Manila, even reaching typhoon victims in Naga and Cagayan.

== Filmography ==
=== Film ===
- Stranded (2019)

=== Television ===
- Gameday Weekend (2014–2016)
- Team U (2014)
- The Score (2014)
- CHInoyTV (2014)
- TV Patrol (2015); Guest Star Patroller
- Mornings @ ANC (2015–2016); Host
- The Daily Serve (2015–2020); Anchor
- Modern Girls (2016–2017); Host
- CHInoyTV (2017–2018); Host
- University Town (2016–2020)
- Umagang Kay Ganda (2016–2020)
- TV Patrol (2015–2018, 2026–present); Segment Host/Substitute Anchor
- Frontline Pilipinas (2021–2023); Sports Segment Anchor
- The Big Story (2021–2025); Anchor
- Woman in Action (2021–2023); Host
- Frontline sa Umaga (2022–2023); Anchor
- Gud Morning Kapatid (2023); Anchor
- Y Speak (TBA)

=== TV specials ===
- Wish Music Awards (2016–present); Host
- Binibining Pilipinas 2017 (2017); Judge
- PMPC Star Awards For TV (2015); Host & Presenter
- Mr. & Ms. Chinatown (2015–2020); Host

== Accolades ==
- 2023 PMAP Best Public Affairs Show for "Woman In Action"
- 2022 Paragala Media Awards -- Paragala Pang Kabataan: News and Current Affairs
- 2020 Paragala Media Awards -- Best News Personality
- 2020 3rd Gawad Lasallianeta -- Most Outstanding Female Correspondent
- 2019 Gawad Pilipino -- Best New Female Segment Host for the Year
- 2018 PMPC Star Awards for TV – Best Lifestyle Show and Best Morning Show Hosts UKG Barkada Winner (Umagang Kay Ganda)
- 2016 PMPC Star Awards for TV – Best Lifestyle Show and Best Morning Show Hosts UKG Barkada Winner (Umagang Kay Ganda)
- Halalan 2016 "Bayan Mo, iPatrol Mo" Ambassador
- 2016 USTv XII Awards—Student's Choice of Personality for Social Media Development, Ranked No. 61
- 2015 PMPC Star Awards for TV – Best Lifestyle Show and Best Lifestyle Show Host Nominee (ChinoyTV)
- Hall of Famer – First Philippine Superliga Ambassadress
- Female Hothlete of the Year – Yahoo Celebrity Awards 2014
- FHM Philippines 100 Sexiest Women 2014, Ranked No. 100
- FHM Philippines 100 Sexiest Women 2015, Ranked No. 61
