= Stanley Chi =

Filipino-Chinese comedian and book author

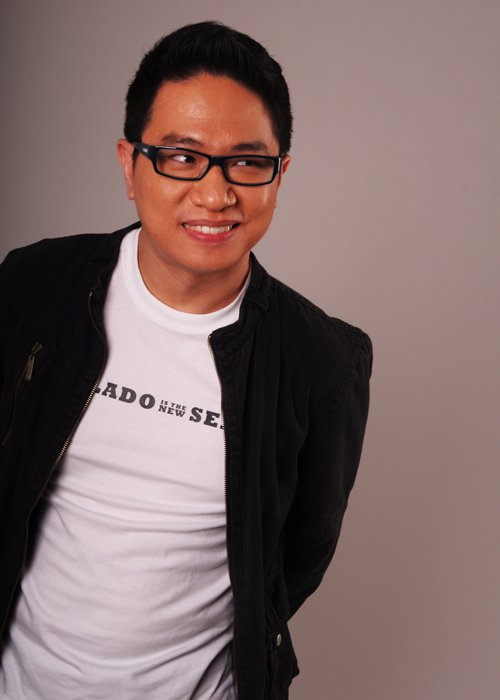
- Stanley Chi wearing a t-shirt with his iconic statement, "Suplado is the new Sexy"
- Born: Stanley Tan Chi; May 12, 1978 (age 48); Philippines
- Occupations: comedian, columnist, cartoonist, tv host, author, video blogger humorist
- Years active: 2007—present
- Website: http://www.youtube.com/stanleychi

Stanley Tan Chi (born May 12, 1978) is a Chinese Filipino observational comedian, cartoonist, TV host, columnist and book author. Chi has gained an underground cult following because of his unique comedic chops. He is the columnist for FHM Philippines' website, One Night Stan and a video blogger for Spot.ph's Suplado in the city.

== Early years ==
A Fine Arts graduate who majored in advertising, Chi graduated from the University of Santo Tomas and quickly acquired a position as Art Director in some of the country's creative centers.

== Chopsticks comic strip ==
Following his resignation in 2003, Chi sent a sample of his comic strip, Chopsticks to one of the Philippines' biggest dailies, the Manila Bulletin owned by the Manila Bulletin Publishing company. Immediately, Chopsticks entered daily circulation as part of the comics section of Bulletin. The first appearance of the said comic strip was on August 1, 2003.

In 2007, PSICOM Publishing, Inc. published Chopsticks book 1. In 2008, Chopsticks 2 Kung-fu Mahjong was released and the 3rd volume Chopsticks 3 Hopia Like It was released last 2010. All of the Chopsticks books was launched at the Manila International Book Fair.

== Observational comedy ==
Besides venturing into comic strips and illustrations to express his Tsinoy point of view humor, Chi has been involved in observational stand-up comedy since 2005. His material focuses on his life as a Filipino Chinese person living in the Philippines and growing up during the 1980s.

== Front Act/Hecklines and Robo Rock Radio ==
On July 19, 2009, Chi and Mike Unson premiered the show, Front Act on TV5. Billed as a comedy talk show, Chi regularly does the segment, "Stanley goes to..." In the said segment, Chi has gone to interview Palawan Mayor Ed Hagedorn, tried out for the UST Growling Tigers and studied magic under JB Dela Cruz.

Other regular segments of the show include: Tambytes, The Lighter Side, Mike and Stanley Presents, Open Mike and Funnymation. In May 2010, the show was later moved to RPN with new co-hosts LC Reklamo, Benedict Bartolome and Bogart the explorer.

In 2011, the show was renamed as Hecklines and is shown on its new network GMA News TV every Saturday 11 pm. Hecklines ran for 1 season and ended last 2012.

Aside from TV, Chi is also one of the co-hosts of the Robo Rock Radio Show as "Mazinger Chi" heard on UR 105.9 every Thursday nights.

== Written work ==
=== Suplado Tips ===
Suplado Tips is Chi's brainchild. It started as a random and impromptu post on Facebook. "That online post turned out to be my very first suplado tip," Chi said. "I toyed with the idea that being cocky can be a means of getting what you want – or at least a way to delude yourself that you already have everything in the first place." Soon after he shared several of his suplado tips on Facebook, people started reposting his tips.

"Many people dream of sticking it to their bosses or giving someone they hate a nasty remark or two, but they often resort to doing none of the above. Filipinos tend to be non-confrontational, avoiding conflicts as much as they can. Suplado Tips is the funny respite that people with a grudge have been looking for," Chi said. "Reading a suplado tip is like acting out a fantasy. The book gives you many scenarios where being standoffish gives you the upper hand, something which otherwise would not happen in real life," Chi added.

Having been released nationwide in National Bookstore and Fully Booked outlets just last March, stores have reported a shortage of the book. In under three months, there have been about 3000 copies sold nationwide. Suplado Tips is already undergoing its first reprinting. The book has reaped a cult following even before the book's release, with readers already scouring bookstores months before the book made it to the shelves.

Suplado Tips has spurred on a series of video testimonials, all of which hailed the book in comical embroidery. Ramon Bautista, a TV celebrity and a host of the former radio show, The Brewrats, gave the first testimonial. "Simula nung tinuruan ako ni Stanley Chi na maging suplado, nawala ang ubo ko (Ever since Stanley Chi taught me how to be stuck-up, my cough disappeared)," Bautista said in the video with pokerfaced wit. Obviously meant as a comical testament, Bautista went on to describe how being suplado has gained him more fans and stalkers, and how it eventually cured his skin problems. (Bautista also stepped up later on to write the book's foreword.) Since then, many other celebrities have given their own hilarious accounts of how Suplado Tips has helped them, some of which were not entirely fictional.

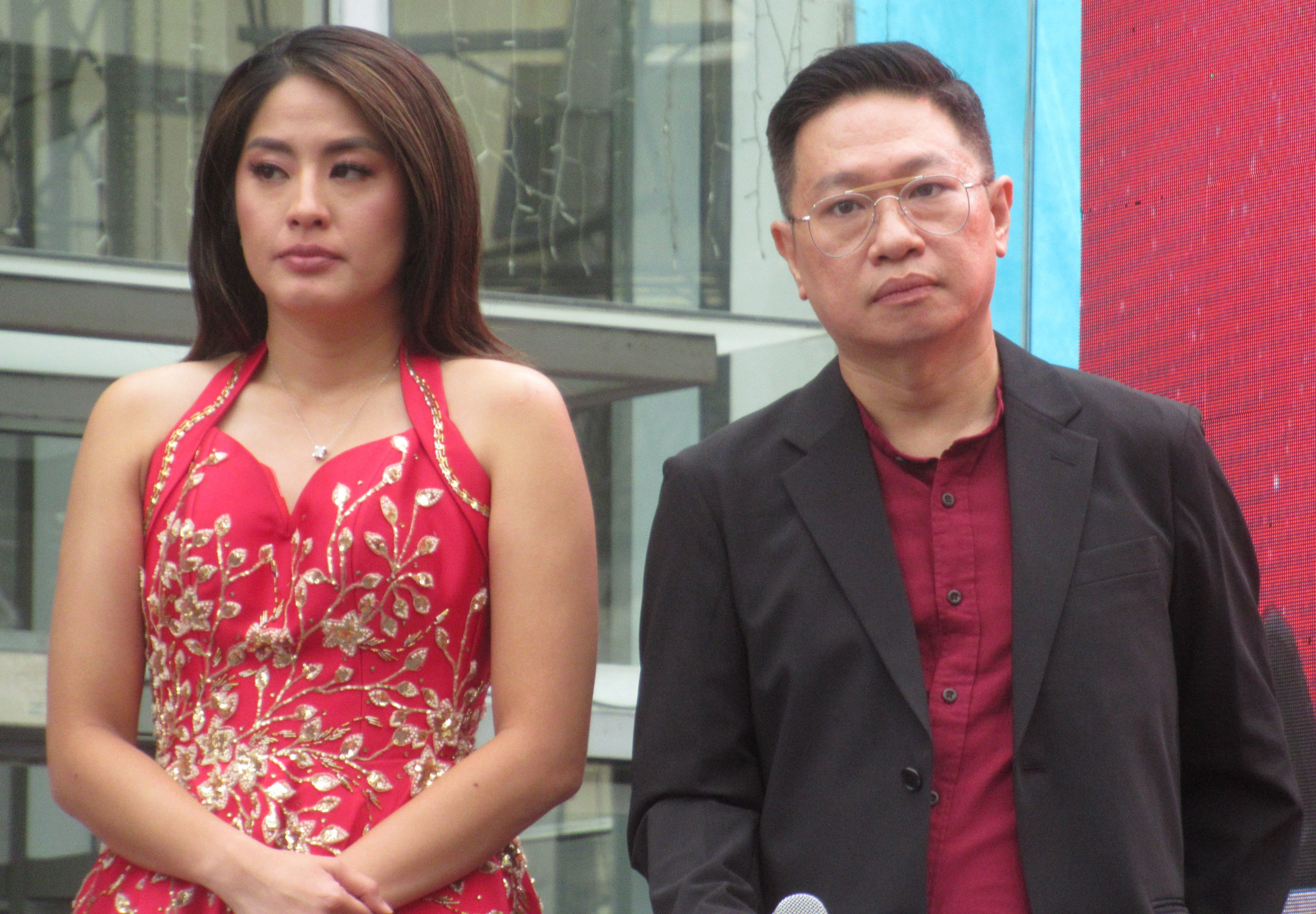
Banaue Chinese New Year

With the book selling well months before the official book launch last May, PSICOM Publishing Inc.'s Tom Aquitania was more than happy that he asked Chi to write the book. After the undeniable popularity of Chi's suplado tips on Facebook and on television's Front Act (of which Chi was a host), Aquitania asked Chi to compile them into a book. "Stanley's suplado tips on Facebook has even led to the creation of the Suplado Society of the Philippines, complete with its own suplado oath. All of this, despite being clearly just a pseudo-serious joke, is also an unmistakable sign that Stanley Chi's suplado tips is something the public will want more of," Aquitania said.

Suplado Tips 2 was launched last March 2012 at National Bookstore Shangri-La mall.

Suplado Tips books 1 and 2 are Chi's 4th and 5th books.

=== Other ===
- After teaching guys how to be suplado, Chi came up with the book Pogi Points the not-so-gentleman's guide to looking good. The book teaches guys how to be a gentleman and was released at the 2012 Manila International Book Fair.
- In 2012, Chi became an ambassador of the Manila International Book Fair with Ramon Bautista, Tado Jimenez and Carlos Celdran. Together they were called the MIBF Bookworms.
- After the success of Suplado Tips and Pogi Points, Chi wrote a parody of the book Men are from Mars, Women are from Venus called Men are from QC, Women are from Alabang which will be produced into a movie by Viva Films. This book also became a best seller under National Book Store's Philippine Publications category.
- The follow-up for Men are from QC, Women are from Alabang is a parody of Chicken Soup for the Soul. The book Chicken Mami for the Sawi was his last book under Psicom Publishing.
- Chi's online column on FHM Philippines entitled One Night Stan was compiled into a book by Summit books with illustrations from Warren Espejo.
- In 2017, Chi wrote the humor book Office Petiks about office politics under Viva books which became a bestseller on National Book Store's best selling list.
- Chi's 12th book Love is Landian with Effort was released in 2019 at the Manila International Book Fair. Published by Viva Books, it is a compilation of his love advice, tips and quotes for people who are looking for love in their 30s and above.
- His ninth book, One Night Stan was released by Summit Media with his launching a video parody of a political TV ad, This book was launched at the FHM BroCon (100 Sexiest Woman Party) on July 11, 2015, at the SMX Convention Center only with Bernardino, and once again on August 1, 2015, at the Trinoma mall with Choii also appearing.

== Audio and video ==
- With the success of his humor book Office Petiks about employees, Chi started a podcast titled Underpaid with Stanley Chi produced by Podcast Network Asia with his co-hosts Madam HR Faye (Faye Saguid) and Papi Lex (Lexter Santos). The podcast discusses work-related topics in a light manner. Notable guests of his podcast were Chinkee Tan, Bo Sanchez, Vince Rapisura, and Bong Nebrija.
- Chi began hosting Philkotse's YouTube channel in May 2020, he hosted Philkotse's Top List and car reviews as the Senpai ng Turbuhan (The Turbomeister) alongside Martin Aguilar the Kambyo boy next door.
- In 2020, Chi and Dr. Rica Cruz, a sexual psychologist, established Feelings, a radio/TV show where they answer questions regarding love, sex, and relationship-related problems. Their show is aired every Sunday on 92.3 Radyo5 True FM and One PH. The program concluded on 92.3 Radyo5 True FM in March 2023. However, it continued airing on One PH until June 25, 2023.
- In 2023, Chi and Laila Chikadora were launched as hosts of Good Vibes, a daily showbiz radio program from Mondays to Fridays from 8:00 PM (formerly 7:30 PM) to 9:30 PM (formerly 9:00 PM) on 92.3 Radyo5 True FM until October 20, 2023.
