= Face of the Enemy =

Face of the Enemy may refer to:

== Literature ==
- The Face of the Enemy (Doctor Who), a novel based on Doctor Who
- "The Face of the Enemy" by Ana Marie Pamintuan

== Television ==
- "Face of the Enemy" (TNG episode), an episode of Star Trek:The Next Generation
- "The Face of the Enemy" (Babylon 5), an episode of Babylon 5
- Battlestar Galactica: The Face of the Enemy, a series of Battlestar Galactica webisodes
