= Cine5 =

First subscription-based television channel in Turkey

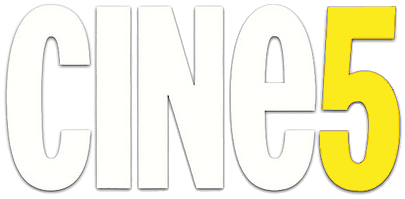
- Country: Turkey
- Affiliates: Radyo5 (1997-2010)
- Headquarters: Barbaros Boulevard, Aşiyan, Bebek, Beşiktaş, Istanbul

Programming
- Language: Turkish
- Picture format: 4:3 (576i, SDTV)

Ownership
- Owner: Erol Aksoy (1993-2004, 2006-2008); TMSF (2004-2006, 2008-2011, 2015); Al Jazeera (2011-2015)
- Sister channels: Show TV (1993-1999)

History
- Launched: 20 September 1993; 33 years ago
- Closed: 30 December 2015; 10 years ago

Links
- Website: http://cine5tv.com.tr

Cine5 was the first subscription-based television channel in Turkey. Founded on 20 September 1993, it primarily broadcast in an encrypted format using the Nagravision Syster analog encryption system. Subscribers were required to use a specific decoder, manufactured by Sagem, to access the channel's premium content. At its peak, the channel surpassed 500,000 subscribers, largely due to its exclusive film library and specialized late-night adult programming, including partnerships with brands like Playboy TV. In late 2002, as part of its MultiCanal digital bouquet, the network launched CineAdult, marking the first dedicated digital adult platform in the Turkish media market . However, in recent years, it enlarged its program spectrum due to competition from other movie-based channels and removed encryption and the subscription policy on January 16, 2006. On February 15, 2011, the channel was put up for sale and bought by Al Jazeera to launch Al Jazeera Türk, however it has never happened (except the short-term digital broadcast).

== Programmes ==
- 32. Gün - Mehmet Ali Birand
- Çarkıfelek - Yıldo
- Turkish Super League - Erman Toroğlu
- Arena - Uğur Dündar
