= Rica Cruz =

Filipino sex therapist

Rica Vina Cruz, popularly known as Rica Cruz or Doc Rica is a licensed psychologist specializing in sex and relationship therapy in the Philippines. She is the first Filipino Board Certified Diplomate in Clinical Sexology.

== Education ==
Cruz graduated from the Ateneo de Manila University with a degree of Master of Arts (MA) in Counseling Psychology in 2015 and a Doctor of Philosophy (PhD) degree in psychology in 2020. She had her specialized training in sex therapy in 2015 at the University of Guelph in Canada. She also acquired certifications in sex and relationship therapy from the Cambridge Health Alliance of Harvard Medical School and Society for the Scientific Study of Sexuality (SSSS).

== Career ==
Cruz started her psychotherapy practice in 2015 at the Ateneo Bulatao Center and later established her own private practice to cater to individuals and couples experiencing relationship issues and sex-related concerns. In addition, she was a lecturer at the Ateneo de Manila University Department of Psychology from 2015 to 2020.

She is a co-host of the talk show Feelings on One PH, a Filipino teleradio news channel by Cignal TV. She also hosts her own show, Love and Sex with Doc Rica, on the FYE Channel of Kumu where she discusses relevant topics about relationships, intimacy, and sexual health.

Cruz launched her own podcast, Conservative Ako, which discusses female sexuality with a scientific and academic lens, in 2019 through Pumapodcast. She also co-hosts The Sexy Minds podcast with Boys’ Night Out’s Tony Toni, where they talk about Filipino sexual experiences and behaviors.

Aside from hosting, Cruz also has a column called "The Sexy Mind Answers" in Tempo News Philippines where she answers readers' frequently asked questions about love, relationships, and sex. Cruz also writes for Smart Parenting magazine's "Love and Relationships" column and contributes to lifestyle media website Metro.Style by ABS-CBN Publishing, Inc. and ABS-CBN Corporation.

Cruz is also the CEO of Unprude, a sexual wellness brand.

In 2023, Cruz became the first Filipino Consulting Editor for the Journal of Sex Research.

== Advocacies ==
Cruz advocates for sex education for Filipinos and has participated in campaigns for HIV awareness and family planning. She has also worked with UN Women and other NGOs to address gender-based violence in the country, and to promote gender equality and women's empowerment. She has launched projects on various platforms, including her podcast, column, and retail brand related sexual health and well-being.

== Controversies ==
In late January 2024, the Philippines' Movie and Television Review and Classification Board (MTRCB) banned her television program, Private Convos with Doc Rica, labeling it as "prurient" due to its explicit discussions on topics such as masturbation, anal sex, and oral sex. The MTRCB's decision came after objections to a scene in a separate TV program involving an LGBTQ couple, reflecting broader societal sensitivities.

The MTRCB upheld its ruling despite appeals, emphasizing that the show's content violated the agency's standards.

The ban was criticized by some publications, with critics arguing that labeling her educational content as "prurient" perpetuates shame and hinders open discussions about sex. She continues to advocate for comprehensive sex education in the Philippines, challenging traditional norms and addressing the stigma surrounding sexual health.

== Academic publications ==
- Cruz, R. V. & Caringal-Go, J. F. (2021). "Filipinos behind closed doors: Nonsexual and sexual constructs as predictors of sexual and relationship satisfaction in Filipino individuals". Sexuality and Culture. 25, 807–834. DOI:10.1007/s12119-020-09795-5
- Cruz, R. V. (2021), "The role of sex guilt as a mediating variable in the association of relationship and sexual satisfaction: An intersectional approach". DOI:10.1007/s12119-021-09912-y
- Cruz, R.V. (2021). "The wife, the mother, and the slut: sexual pleasure for the Filipino woman a grounded theory approach". Sexual and Relationship Therapy. DOI: 10.1080/14681994.2022.2031150
- Cruz, R.V. & Militante, K. (2022). "To give or to receive? Oral sexual activities as predictor of sexual satisfaction in Filipino men and women". Sexuality and Culture. 26, 1477–1489. DOI: 10.1007/s12119-022-09954-w
