= Feelings (talk show) =

Philippine television talk show

- Title card
- Genre: Talk show; sex education
- Presented by: Rica Cruz; Stanley Chi
- Country of origin: Philippines
- Original language: Tagalog

Production
- Production location: Philippines
- Camera setup: Multiple-camera setup
- Running time: 60 to 120 minutes

Original release
- Network: One PH
- Release: October 5, 2020 – June 25, 2023

Feelings
- Genre: Talk show; sex education
- Running time: 60 to 120 minutes
- Country of origin: Philippines
- Home station: Radyo 5 95.2 News FM (2020–23)
- Hosted by: Rica Cruz; Stanley Chi
- Original release: October 5, 2020 – March 2023

Feelings is a Philippine television and radio talk show broadcast by One PH and Radyo Singko 92.3 News FM. Hosted by Rica Cruz and Stanley Chi, it premiered on October 5, 2020. The show concluded on June 25, 2023.

== Premise ==
Feelings is a show about sex, love, and relationships that aired Monday to Friday on One PH. It is recognized for its frank, educational, and often humorous discussions regarding human sexuality, reproductive health, and modern relationships.

== Hosts ==
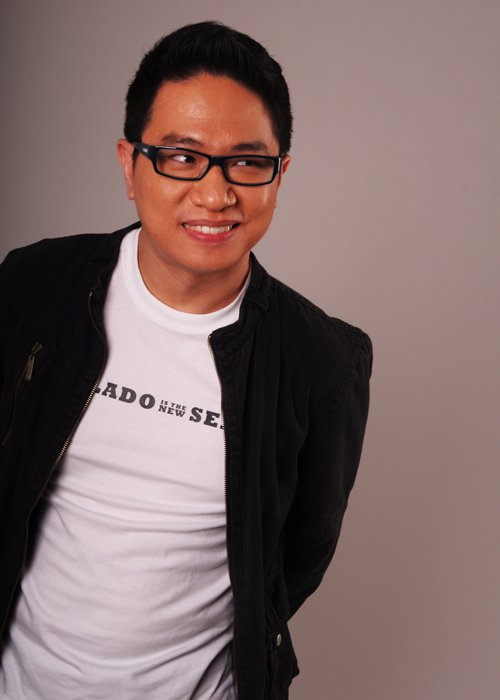
Stanley Chi served as one of the hosts.

- Rica Cruz
- Stanley Chi
