= Discaya interviews =

2025 political scandal in the Philippines

2024–25 Discaya interviews
- Type: Vlog / Television segments
- Hosts: Julius Babao; Korina Sanchez
- Guests: Curlee and Sarah Discaya
- Videos: Julius Babao Unplugged; September 2024 Rated Korina; November 24, 2024 Korina Interviews; January 5, 2025

The Discaya interviews were a series of interviews with Curlee and Sarah Discaya which were released online from September 2024 to January 2025. These interviews were publicized in August 2025 by Pasig Mayor Vico Sotto. The videos, one by Julius Babao and two by Korina Sanchez were alleged to be undeclared paid placements by Sotto raising journalist ethics issues concerns.

== Background ==
External videos
- September 2024 Discaya interview
- "Exclusive! Ate Sarah at Kuya Curlee, Dating Mahirap na Naging Bilyonaryo!" at Julius Babao Unplugged

Curlee and Sarah Discaya are a couple who are linked to Alpha and Omega Gen. Contractor & Development Corporation, St. Timothy Construction, and St. Gerrard Construction General Contractor and Development Corporation, contractors which has projects with the Department of Public Works and Highways. (DPWH).

Their "rags-to-riches" stories has featured in Julius Babao's interview of the couple in September 2024 and in Korina Sanchez's feature of Sara Discaya in her shows in November 2024 and January 2025.

Sarah ran for the position of Mayor of Pasig in the 2025 election. She lost to incumbent Vico Sotto.

== Release ==
The release details for the three features are as follows:

| Work | Series | Host | Guest(s) | Release date |
|---|---|---|---|---|
| "Exclusive! Ate Sarah at Kuya Curlee, Dating Mahirap na Naging Bilyonaryo!" (lit. 'Sarah and Curlee, Formerly Poor who Became Billionaries!' | Julius Babao Unplugged | Julius Babao | Curlee Discaya; Sarah Discaya | September 2024 |
| "Kaya ni Hubby, Kaya ni Wifey!" | Rated Korina | Korina Sanchez | Sarah Discaya | November 24, 2024 |
| "A Victim of Bullying, Now a Politician" | Korina Interviews (Net 25) | Korina Sanchez | Curlee Discaya; Sarah Discaya | January 5, 2025 |

The Rated Korina and Korina Features features was later removed from YouTube.

== Paid placement allegations ==
On August 11, 2025, President Bongbong Marcos flagged the top 15 contractors involved in the government's flood control project for possible irregularities in his 4th State of the Nation Address. On the same day Pasig mayor Vico Sotto on Facebook highlighted that Alpha & Omega, St. Timothy, and St. Gerrard are owned by the Discayas.

Sotto on August 21, discussed the three videos and alleged that the Discayas paid ₱10 million to be featured by prominent journalists in their shows. However he did admit that the alleged placement money Sotto gave is not the exact figure. While he provided screenshots of features hosted by Korina Sanchez and Julius Babao, he did not explicitly name the two journalists.

== Responses from Babao and Sanchez ==
Both Julius Babao and Korina Sanchez rejected the allegation of being paid ₱10 million for their respective features.

Babao also underscored that his interview with the Discayas are not a news report but a lifestyle feature and politics was not raised at the time during the feature's production.

Viktory 8 Media, the producers of Rated Korina and Korina Interviews, said that Sanchez only became aware of Sarah Discaya's impending mayoral bid at the day of the January 2025 interview. They insist they do not produce either "hit" or "vanity" pieces and that Sotto's claim constitutes cyberlibel. They issued two statements with the phrase "there are payments for certain businesses such as that of the Discayas, products, personalities, companies, or politicians much like payments made for advertisements" removed from the second statement.

Babao went on leave from being a newscaster in Frontline Pilipinas of TV5 from August 25, 2025.

== Journalist ethics ==
The National Union of Journalists of the Philippines (NUJP) maintains that, while Sotto's allegation is unsubstantiated, journalists being compensated in exchange for "favorable coverage" of their benefactors is unethical.

== Investigations on luxury vehicles ==
The Bureau of Customs and the Bureau of Internal Revenue announced that they would open their respective investigations regarding the ownership of the 40 luxury vehicles featured in one of the interviews.
