= The Chiefs (TV program) =

Philippine television program

- Title card
- Genre: Talk show Current affairs
- Created by: Cignal TV
- Presented by: Ed Lingao; Roby Alampay; Amy Pamintuan; Luchi Cruz-Valdes
- Opening theme: One News theme
- Country of origin: Philippines
- Original language: English

Production
- Production locations: TV5 Media Center, Reliance cor. Sheridan Sts., Mandaluyong
- Camera setup: Multiple-camera setup
- Running time: 1 hour
- Production company: News5

Original release
- Network: One News (since May 28, 2018)
- Release: May 28, 2018 – present

The Chiefs is a Philippine television current affairs talk show broadcast by One News, hosted by News5 chief correspondent Ed Lingao, News5 chief Luchi Cruz-Valdes, BusinessWorld editor-in-chief emeritus Roby Alampay, and Philippine Star editor-in-chief Amy Pamintuan.

It premiered on May 28, 2018. It airs every weeknight at 10 PM (PST). The program was broadcast by TV5 from August 26, 2019 to July 17, 2020 and returned from March 13 to June 19, 2022 and from January 22 to February 26, 2023 and from October 29 to November 11, 2023.

== Hosts ==
- Ed Lingao
- Roby Alampay
- Amy Pamintuan
- Luchi Cruz-Valdes

== See also ==
- One News
