= Safe Ka Ba, 2025? =

2025 Filipino television special

- Written by: Myrna Angelyn Meneses Gamido
- Directed by: Benhur Mojado (uncredited)
- Presented by: Edu Manzano
- Country of origin: Philippines
- Original languages: Filipino, English

Production
- Producers: Paul Padua (consulting); John Peter Pormento (spiels)
- Production locations: TV5 Media Center, Mandaluyong
- Cinematography: Benhur Mojado
- Editors: Dorina Naraval (master); Ramyer Medina (offline)
- Camera setup: Multi-camera
- Running time: 48 minutes
- Production company: Cignal TV

Original release
- Network: One PH
- Release: December 20, 2025

Safe Ka Ba, 2025? (transl. Are You Safe, 2025?) is a 2025 Filipino documentary television special produced by Cignal TV and hosted by Edu Manzano. It recounts the notable events and turbulent politics that occurred in the Philippines in 2025. Titled in reference to a remark made by Senator Rodante Marcoleta during the Blue Ribbon Committee hearings on the flood control projects scandal, Safe Ka Ba, 2025? first aired on One PH in the Philippines on December 20, 2025.

== Background ==
As the massive flood control projects scandal gained national attention in the Philippines during the latter half of 2025, actor and television presenter Edu Manzano began regularly posting satirical AI-generated memes on Facebook that commented on the country's ongoing corruption scandal, largely receiving a positive response from online users.

== Overview ==
In the special, Manzano wore a barong tagalog, the attire worn by Philippine congressmen, and a hard hat. Among the high-profile events recounted in the special were: the impeachment of Vice President Sara Duterte, the arrest of former president Rodrigo Duterte, the mid-term elections, the flood control projects scandal and the resulting anti-corruption protests, the election of Pope Leo XIV, the successes of tennis player Alex Eala, and the devastation wrought by Typhoon Tino on Cebu.

== Release ==
One PH first began marketing Safe Ka Ba, 2025? on December 11, 2025.

The special first aired on One PH in the Philippines on December 20, 2025, and was later broadcast on TV5 later that evening. It was released on YouTube in its entirety on December 23, 2025.
