= One Balita Pilipinas =

2019 Philippine television news show of One PH

- Genre: Newscast; Live action
- Created by: Cignal TV
- Developed by: News5/One PH
- Directed by: Raffy Romano (2019–20); Benedict Carlos (2020–present)
- Presented by: Cheryl Cosim
- Narrated by: Cheryl Cosim
- Country of origin: Philippines
- Original language: Tagalog
- No. of episodes: N/A (airs daily)

Production
- Production locations: TV5 Media Center, Reliance cor. Sheridan Sts., Mandaluyong, Metro Manila, Philippines
- Running time: 15 minutes (2019); 30 minutes (2019–2020; 2020–2024); 60 minutes (2020–present)
- Production company: News5

Original release
- Network: One PH; One News (2021–present)
- Release: February 18, 2019 – present

Related
- Big News; Sentro; Aksyon; TEN: The Evening News; Frontline Pilipinas; The Big Story

One Balita Pilipinas (lit. 'One News Philippines', formerly known as One Balita) is the rolling newscast service of One PH, the 24/7 Filipino-language cable news channel of Cignal TV.

Serving as the channel's flagship newscast, the main noontime edition airs from Monday to Friday from 12:00 PM to 1:00 PM (PST).

The newscasts were simulcast on radio through 92.3 News FM Radyo5 (now 92.3 Radyo5 True FM and later 105.9 True FM) in Mega Manila and its provincial Radyo5 stations nationwide, until January 20, 2023. However, its radio simulcast resumed on July 17, 2023, while its noontime edition was reverted to the original timeslot, replacing the 1-hour simulcast of E.A.T.. Its radio simulcast ended on October 23, 2023, to give way to the new radio program, Heart to Heart. However, on July 6, 2026, the newscast resumed its simulcast on 105.9 True FM (until September 18, 2026) and began its simulcast on True TV, after Heart to Heart moved to the primetime slot, until the channel ceased broadcast on August 15 of the same year. It is also simulcast on One News, the English-language sister news channel of One PH.

The newscast also airs worldwide via Kapatid Channel International and Aksyon TV International.

== History ==
=== As a noontime newscast ===
On June 1, 2020, the newscast launched its new title card. On the same day, the original noontime edition of the newscast went back on air, and it was renamed as "One Balita Pilipinas," which resulted in airing twice a day with the same name.

On June 8, 2020, One PH launched a new program titled Idol in Action, which features live public service on television and is presented by Raffy Tulfo, with Marga Vargas and MJ Marfori. After 2 complainants and some segments, they will proceed to the news using the name of One Balita Pilipinas.

On October 2, 2020, Cosim replaced Tulfo as the anchor of the newscast's original noontime edition which aired on TV5 until October 16 to make way for the launch of Lunch Out Loud on October 19.

On February 15, 2022, former actor and UNTV news anchor Diego Castro III joined Cheryl Cosim in the noontime edition.

== See also ==
- Aksyon
- Andar ng mga Balita
- Frontline Tonight
- News5
- One PH
