= The Big Story (TV program) =

Philippine television news show

- Title card
- Genre: Newscast; Live action
- Created by: Cignal TV
- Presented by: Ces Drilon
- Opening theme: "Breaking News" by MemoryProd
- Country of origin: Philippines
- Original language: English

Production
- Production locations: TV5 Media Center, Reliance cor. Sheridan Sts., Mandaluyong
- Camera setup: Multiple-camera setup
- Running time: 60 minutes
- Production company: News5

Original release
- Network: Bloomberg TV Philippines (2016–18); One News (since 2018); TV5 (2019); One PH (2024)
- Release: October 24, 2016 – present

The Big Story is a Philippine television news broadcasting show broadcast by Bloomberg TV Philippines, One News, TV5 and One PH. Originally anchored by Roby Alampay. it aired from October 24, 2016 to present. Ces Drilon current served as the anchor. The newscasts aired weekdays at 8:45 pm in 2016 (later moved to 8 pm in 2018, 8:10 pm and 7:30 pm in 2024 and back at 8 pm since 2025).

== History ==
Bloomberg TV Philippines launches its first-ever primetime news program, The Big Story, which was first aired on October 24, 2016, at 8:45 pm. It continued to run until the local Bloomberg channel relaunched as One News on May 28, 2018, and expanded its airtime, with an earlier timeslot at 8:00 pm.

On March 4, 2019, the program began broadcasting on free TV via One News sister channel, TV5, replacing Aksyon Tonite as a late-night newscast and airs every weeknights at 10:00 PM, (PST). It is the first English-language newscast of the network since Big News from 1962 to 1972 and from 1992 to 2004 and Sentro from 2007 to 2008. However, it was replaced by the delayed telecast of One Balita Pilipinas, produced by sister station One PH beginning September 23, 2019, anchored by former Aksyon Tonite anchor Cheryl Cosim.

On February 1, 2021, Gretchen Ho served as the main presenter of the program. She was later joined by Regina Lay and Shawn Yao on April 10, 2023. In early-2025, Lay was replaced by former CNN Philippines personality Pauline Verzosa.

On February 23, 2025, Media Newser Philippines reported that Ces Oreña-Drilon would be joining The Big Story. Her role was officially confirmed after she signed a contract with News5, Cignal TV, and MediaQuest on February 26, 2025. She began anchoring the newscast on March 3, 2025.

On June 1, 2026, The Big Story returned to a single-anchor format, with Ces Oreña-Drilon serving as the sole anchor after three years under a multi-anchor format. Co-anchors Shawn Yao and Pauline Versoza were reassigned to other programs within the network.

== Anchors ==
=== Main presenters ===
- Ces Drilon (2025–present)

=== Substitute presenters ===
- Rizza Diaz (2022–present)
- Angela Lagunzad Castro (2023–present)
- Maricel Halili (2021–present)
- Jay Taruc (2021)
- Jester "Jes" Delos Santos (2020)

=== Former anchors ===
- Roby Alampay (2016–23)
- Gretchen Ho (2021–25)
- Regina Lay (2023–25)
- Shawn Yao (2023–26)
- Pauline Verzosa (2025–26)
