= CHInoyTV =

- 菲華電視台
- Genre: News program
- Directed by: Mike Carandang
- Presented by: Janeena Chan
- Country of origin: Philippines
- Original languages: English; Tagalog; Mandarin

Production
- Running time: 30 minutes

Original release
- Network: IBC (2009–10); Net 25 (2010–14); PTV (2014–17); ANC (2017–20); DZMM TeleRadyo (2020); CNN Philippines (2021–22); One News (2024–25); Bilyonaryo News Channel (2025–present)
- Release: October 25, 2009 – present

CHInoyTV (Traditional Chinese: 菲華電視台, Simplified Chinese: 菲华电视台, Pinyin: Fēi huá diànshìtái, Hokkien: Hui hôa tiān sī tai, Cantonese: Fēi wàh dihn sih tòih), is a weekly program that focuses on news, events and culture associated with the national Chinese Filipino community.

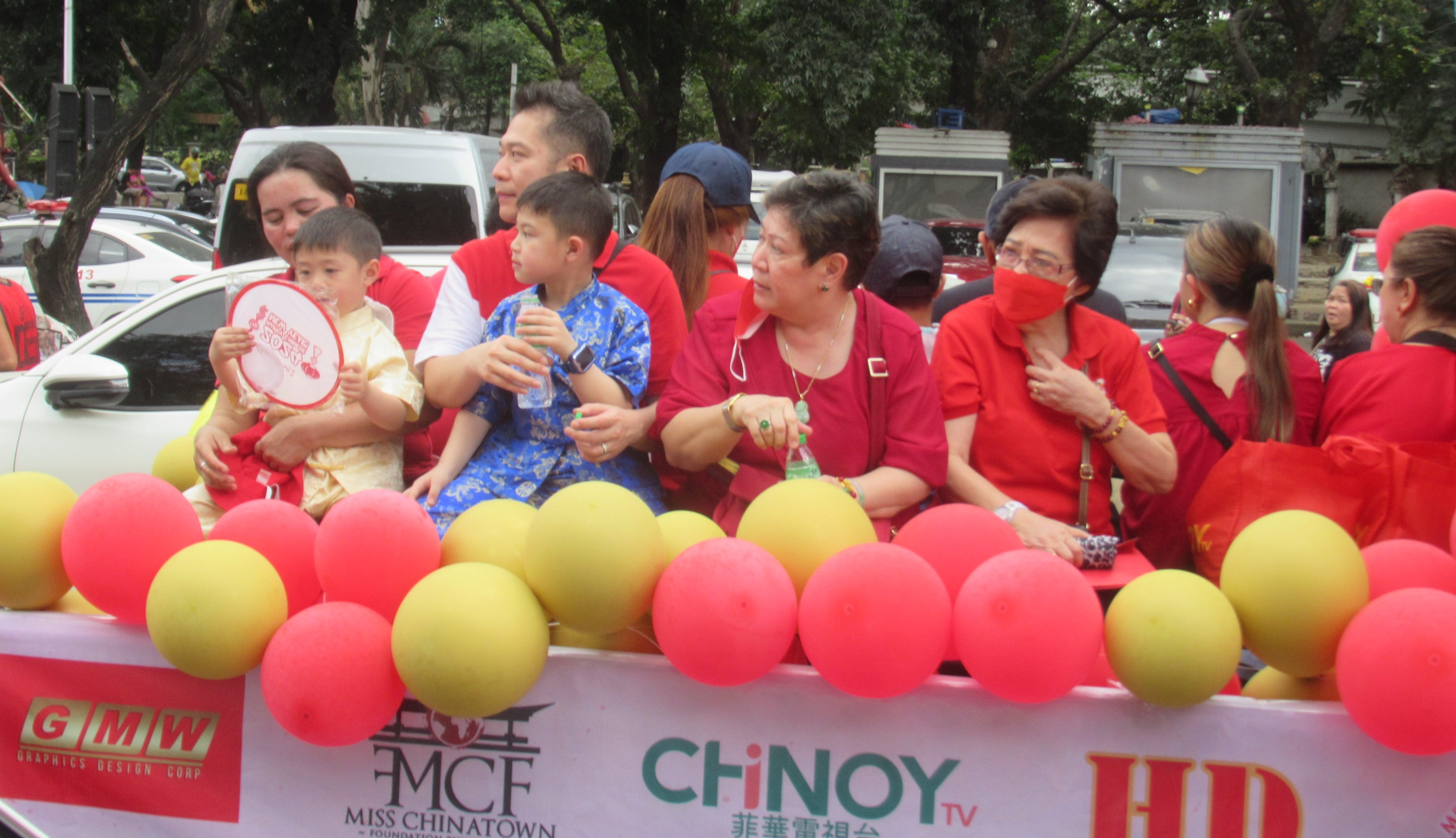
Manila Chinatown Solidarity Parade Chinese New Year 2024

CHInoyTV traces its roots to the 2009–2010 series Chi on IBC from October 25, 2009 to 2010. The series has since aired on multiple networks, moving to Net 25 from 2010 to 2014, PTV from June 29, 2014 to March 5, 2017 and the ABS-CBN News Channel from March 11, 2017 until 2020 before moving to CNN Philippines from 2021 to 2022 and on One News since September 8, 2024.

The series is presented in three languages, with English, Filipino, and Mandarin Chinese being used in either dubbed or subtitled forms.
