= Amy Pamintuan =

Filipina journalist and editor

Ana Marie "Amy" Pamintuan
- Citizenship: Filipino
- Education: University of the Philippines (BA Journalism, 1981)
- Occupation: Editor-in-chief of The Philippine Star

Ana Marie "Amy" Pamintuan is a Filipino journalist who currently serves as editor-in-chief of The Philippine Star.

== Biography ==
In 1981, Pamintuan graduated with a journalism degree from UP Diliman. She was first a long-time reporter before writing news commentaries under the column name of Sketches published thrice a week by The Star.

In 1995, the Vantage Press published Pamintuan's novel The Face of the Enemy.

Also The Star's past executive editor, Pamintuan now serves as editor-in-chief after replacing Isaac Belmonte in January 2012. That was 26 years in the making for a Star reporter to be elevated to the top post of EIC.

Pamintuan has also been co-hosting current affairs programs on TV5 since 2018 for The Chiefs and the election-coverage Bilang Pilipino since 2016.

== Career highlights and distinctions ==
- Fellow, Global Managers' Program, Asian Institute of Management
- Fellow, United States Information Service, 1996
- Outstanding Alumna for Journalism, University of the Philippines, 2008
- 2x Journalist of the Year, Rotary Club of Manila, 2012 & 2016
- Outstanding Native of Pangasinan, 2015
- Journalists of Courage and Impact Awards, East-West Center, 2024

== See also ==
- "UP in the Time of People Power (1983-2005): A Centennial Publication" (2009). Ferdinand C. Llanes, editor; Ma. Bernadette L. Abrera...[et al.], contributors; Jose Y. Dalisay, executive editor ISBN 978-971-542-623-7, University of the Philippines Press
