= Andar ng mga Balita (radio) =

Philippine morning newscast of Radyo5 92.3 News FM

- Title card used on its AksyonTV simulcast, identical to its TV adaptation
- Genre: newscast
- Running time: 1 hour
- Country of origin: Philippines
- Home station: Radyo5 92.3 News FM
- TV adaptations: Andar ng mga Balita (AksyonTV)
- Hosted by: Martin Andanar
- Created by: Associated Broadcasting Company (Radyo5)
- Original release: November 8, 2010 – August 10, 2012
- No. of episodes: n/a (airs daily)
- Podcast: Andar ng mga Balita Podcast

Andar ng mga Balita (lit. transl. Movement of the News) was a newscast of FM station Radyo5 92.3 News FM in Mega Manila, Philippines. Anchored by Martin Andanar, the newscast aired from Monday to Friday from 4:00 a.m. to 5:00 a.m., with television simulcast on AksyonTV.

Launched on November 8, 2010, Andar ng mga Balita was the first ever program to be aired over Radyo5 92.3 News FM. On February 21, 2011, it started its TV simulcast on AksyonTV and became the first ever program to be aired there. This was also the first radio program hosted by Martin Andanar. It made its final broadcast day on August 10, 2012, to make way for the new program entitled Manila sa Umaga (lit. transl. Manila in the Morning), hosted by Arnell Ignacio. Andanar then joined Erwin Tulfo on Punto Asintado, which aired from 8:00 to 10:00 am.

Its TV newscast, however, aired weekdays as a nightly newscast and later as a noontime newscast on AksyonTV from 2011 to 2014.

== Anchors ==
- Martin Andanar
- Mylene Valencia - Metro and regional news anchor
- Sugar Sallador - World news anchor
- Atty. Mike Templo - alternate World news anchor
- Benjie "Tsongkibenj" Felipe - ShowBilis! at Andar ni Tsongki Benj anchor

== Segments ==
- Headlines Ngayon - Top Stories of the day
- Headlines Noon - History
- Sports - Sports News
- ShowBilis at Andar ni Tsongki Benj (Mabilis na Andar ng mga Balitang Showbiz) - Showbiz News
- Weather - Weather Forecast
- MP3 (Mula Plaka hanggang MP3) - Music from LP to MP3
- Police Reports - roundup of the latest police reports
- Andar Tanod Agents 005 - different barangay "tanod" will give reports about their community over the night.
