= DWFM =

Radio station in Metro Manila, Philippines

FMR Manila (DWFM)
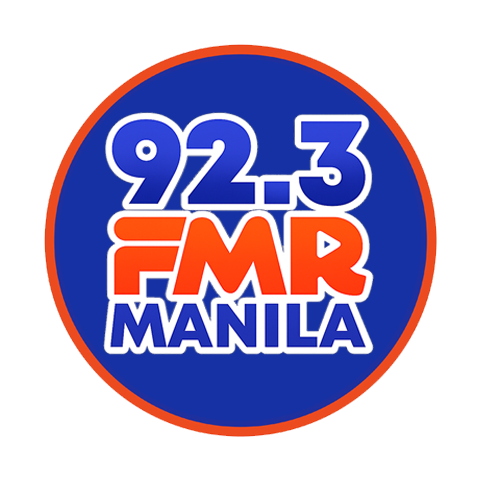
- Quezon City; Philippines
- Broadcast area: Mega Manila and surrounding areas
- Frequency: 92.3 MHz
- RDS: 1. KA-VIBES; 2. FMR MNL; 3. 92.3
- Branding: 92.3 FMR

Programming
- Language: Filipino
- Format: Contemporary MOR, OPM, Talk
- Network: Favorite Music Radio
- Affiliations: PRTV Prime Media (for Arangkada Balita newscast); TV5 News (for Ted Failon at DJ Chacha sa True FM)

Ownership
- Owner: Nation Broadcasting Corporation
- Operator: Philippine Collective Media Corporation (outright acquisition of the frequency pending)
- Sister stations: Through PCMC: DZMM Radyo Patrol 630; DZMM TeleRadyo; PRTV Prime Media (DWKC-DTV)

History
- First air date: 1973
- Former call signs: DZRU (1998–2007)
- Former names: MRS (1973–98); Joey (1998–2007); XFM (2007–09); U92 (2009–10); Radyo5 (2010–24)
- Call sign meaning: Frequency Modulation

Technical information
- Licensing authority: NTC
- Power: 25,000 watts
- ERP: 75,000 watts
- Transmitter coordinates: 14°36′25.564″N 121°09′48.557″E
- Repeaters: Baguio: DZYB 102.3 MHz; Bacolod: DYBC 102.3 MHz; General Santos: DXOO 97.5 MHz

Links
- Webcast: Listen Live
- Website: pcmc.com.ph/923fmrmanila

DWFM (92.3 FM), broadcasting as 92.3 FMR, is a radio station owned by Nation Broadcasting Corporation and operated by Philippine Collective Media Corporation. It serves as the flagship station of the Favorite Music Radio network. The station's studio is located at 5th Floor, The Ignacia Place, 62 Sgt. Esguerra Ave corner Mother Ignacia Ave., Barangay South Triangle, Diliman, Quezon City; its transmitter is located at NBC compound, Block 3, Emerald Hills, Sumulong Highway, Antipolo.

== History ==
=== 1973–1998: MRS ===
DWFM signed on in 1973 as MRS 92.3 (MRS meaning Most Requested Song), Manila's third FM station at that time. Having an adult contemporary format during its existence, the station is known for playing the most requested song every hour. DWFM quickly became the top-rated FM station in Manila, and held this title for most of its existence. The success of DWFM led NBC to establish other FM stations using a similar format, including Cebu's DYNC in 1975, and Davao's DXFM.

Its first home was in Sikatuna Building (formerly National Life Insurance Building) along Ayala Avenue. In the 80s, it moved to Jacinta Building 1 along Pasay Road. It later on moved to the NBC Tower/Jacinta Building 2 (now ACQ Tower) along EDSA.

=== 1998–2007: Joey ===
In September 1998, NBC was acquired by MediaQuest Holdings, Inc., a broadcasting company owned by the PLDT's Beneficial Trust Fund from the consortium of the Yabut family and then House Speaker Manny Villar. In November 1998, DWFM switched to a smooth jazz station as Joey @ Rhythms 92.3 (also known as Joey @ 92.3). Radio executive Francis Lumen assumed the position of president and CEO bringing with him his previous 10 years of managing Citylite 88.3 (now Jam 88.3). The call letters were also changed to DZRU.

The jazz format would also be implemented on all of NBC's other FM stations, who used other female names for their branding. It was also during this period that NBC entered into a joint venture with MTV Asia for an MTV Philippines feed via NBC's UHF Network (Channel 41). It also featured new-age instrumental music during the Paschal Triduum of the annual Holy Week during that era, which is dubbed as "Take 20".

In 2004, the Rhythms tag was dropped, thus becoming 923 Joey (pronounced as "nine-two-three"), with the station slogan "It's a Groove Thing". In January 2007, the station was taken over by new management, led by radio executives Raymund Miranda and Al Torres (former voiceover for GMA Network, GTV, Heart of Asia Channel, and I Heart Movies, currently based in Canada), along with sales executive Amy Victa. Together with the new team, the butterfly was dropped from the logo and the official call letters were returned to DWFM, the original call letters of the station.

=== 2007–2009: XFM ===
On Easter Sunday, April 8, 2007, the station was relaunched as 92.3 xFM, airing downtempo, trip hop and house music. It also reverted its call letters back to DWFM. In August 2007, easy listening tracks were added to the station's playlist, which led to the scrapping of the electronica format in January 2008.

In February 2008, the station reverted to its smooth jazz format. Now known as XFM 92.3, it adopted the slogans "Stress Free Radio", "Cool, Hip, Light, Smooth and all that Jazz" and "Light N Up!".

=== 2009–2010: U92 ===
On October 1, 2009, All Youth Channels, owner of the now-defunct MTV Philippines, took over the station's operations and rebranded it as U92 with the youth-oriented slogan "Cool To Be U". It carried a contemporary hit radio format, which was also tightly cross-promoted and shared talent with MTV Philippines, which had been broadcast by NBC's stations until mid-2007 when AYC took over the MTV franchise in the country and converted it to a cable-only service. Thus, the on-air personalities are a mix of former and current MTV Philippines VJ's, celebrities and career radio people. At that time, its studios moved from NBC Tower to Silver City Mall in Pasig.

On October 1, 2010, U92 transitioned to a fully automated station, eight months after MTV Philippines shut down on February 15, which signified another branding to the station.

=== 2010–2024: Radyo5 ===
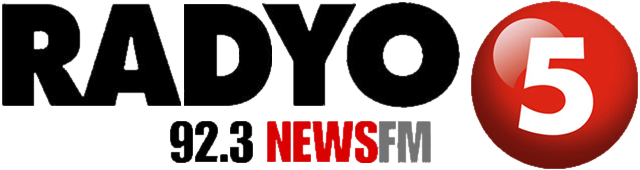
Radyo5 92.3 News FM station logo from 2010 to 2018

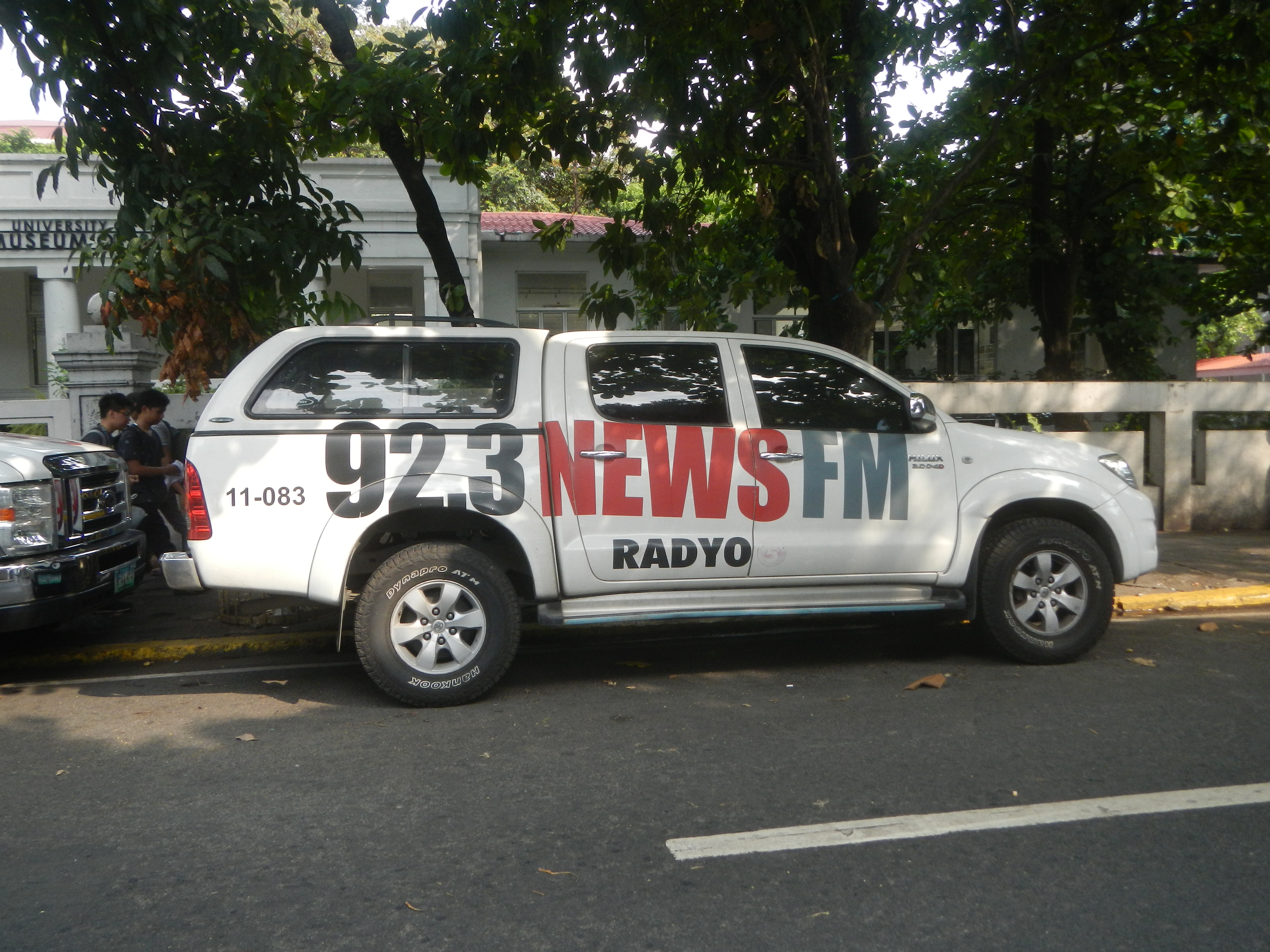
OB van of Radyo5 92.3 News FM along Padre Faura Street in Manila

On November 8, 2010, after almost a month of test broadcast, DWFM made another first in the history of FM radio broadcasting in the Philippines, as the station flipped to a news/talk format as Radyo5 92.3 News FM; becoming the flagship station for a new radio network operated in conjunction with the news department of TV5 (which PLDT media subsidiary MediaQuest recently acquired a majority stake of in earlier in the year). At that time, the station's studios moved again from Silver City Mall in Pasig to TV5 Studio Complex in Novaliches, Quezon City. The move came as part of a plan to expand TV5's news operation in order to become more competitive with the other major networks, which also included the launch of a news network on NBC's television stations, AksyonTV (which also simulcasts some of its programming until its shutdown in 2019). Most of the personalities are former anchors and reporters from different AM-radio stations in Mega Manila including Neil Ocampo, Laila Chikadora, Cheryl Cosim, Cristy Fermin (from DZMM), Raffy Tulfo, Nina Taduran, Ruel Otieco, JV Arcena, Sharee Roman (from DZXL), Arnell Ignacio, Shalala (from DZBB), Izza Reniva-Cruz (from Veritas 846), Zony Esguerra (from DZME), and Arnold "Popoy" Rei (from MOR 101.9). Andar ng mga Balita was News FM's inaugural program.

In less than six months under the new format, Radyo5 ranked as the fourth most listened to FM stations in Metro Manila. In March 2012, the Radio Research Council ranked Radyo5 as the number 1 news radio station in the market in a survey of motorists. Afterwards, in 2013, Radyo5 was declared again by the PSRC Car Coincidental Survey as the most preferred & listened FM station for public utility vehicles.

On December 23, 2013, Radyo5 transferred its studios from the TV5 Studio Complex in Novaliches, Quezon City to their new home at TV5 Media Center along Reliance Street, Mandaluyong.

In 2017, a series of budget cuts were imposed by TV5's management. Among those affected were Radyo5's overnight operations. The network changed broadcast times twice until February 16, 2018, when they made a permanent daily 20-hour run (4:00 am until midnight), adding music content during early morning and late-night (except during radio coverage of double-header Philippine Basketball Association game days).

Radyo5 92.3 News FM station logo from 2018 to 2022, with current TV5 logo adopted from 2019 to 2022

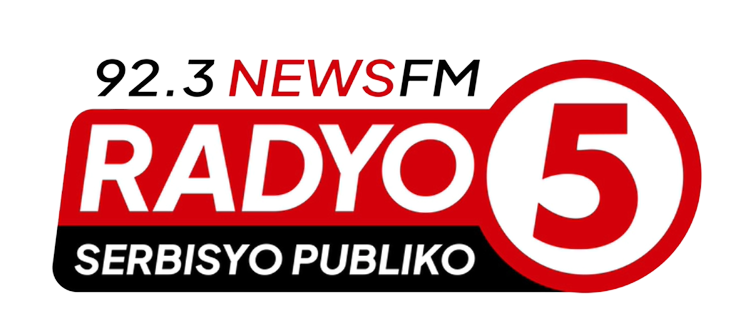
Radyo5 92.3 News FM station logo used from November 8, 2022, to March 7, 2023.

On November 8, 2022, coinciding with the 12th anniversary of the station, it launched its new slogan "Ito ang Totoong Tunog ng Serbisyo Publiko" (transl. "This is the True Sound of Public Service").

During TV5's trade launch, Radyo5 announced its plans for its relaunching scheduled January 23, 2023, along with new programs, and its renewed expansion to key cities nationwide.

92.3 Radyo5 True FM station logo used from March 8, 2023, to November 4, 2024.

On March 8, 2023, Radyo5 changed its sub-brand to True FM and adopted the slogan "Dito Tayo sa Totoo!" (transl. "Let's Be Real Here!"), along with its first-ever jingle composed and arranged by Francis de Veyra. In addition, it debuted its radio dramas, including its first-ever radio drama, Sana Lourd, which also airs live on the station's Facebook page.

On May 1, 2024, Radyo5 launched another TeleRadyo channel True FM TV, which is exclusive on Cignal Channel 19.

On November 4, 2024, at midnight, True FM signed off for the last time on this frequency, accompanied with a farewell message. It then transferred its operations to DWLA 105.9, owned by Bright Star Broadcasting Network Corporation.

==== One PH ====
After the shutdown of AksyonTV on January 13, 2019, Radyo5 programs began broadcasting in a Cignal-exclusive "teleradyo" channel, One PH, which was initially launched on February 18 and officially launched on July 31. Coinciding with the said launch, Radyo5 was added with new studios and programs, and re-extended its weekday broadcast hours.

Starting August and September 2019, selected Radyo5 and One PH programs (Morning Calls, One Balita, One Balita Pilipinas, Wag Po! and Turbo Time with Mike and Lindy) begin its airing on either simulcast or delayed basis on TV5 as part of programming revamp spearheaded by TV5 Network's new CEO Jane Basas.

On March 17, 2020, Radyo5, along with One PH, temporarily suspended its regular programming as an effect of the Luzon-wide "enhanced community quarantine" against COVID-19. The radio station aired the special edition of One News Now and automated music throughout the day. However, regular programs resumed after a few months.

In December 2020, Cignal TV and Philstar Media Group took over the operations and programming of Radyo5, respectively. With this development, some of the station's programs aired their respective final episodes during the final weeks of December 2020. On January 1, 2021, One PH's programming (except for overnight slots) have been integrated to the programming schedule of Radyo5 and all the music blocks have been removed. The new management retained the radio coverage rights of PBA games, in which its existing exclusive contract between PBA and One Sports (formerly Sports5 and ESPN5) expired by the end of 2022.

The integrated programming of Radyo5 and One PH ended upon the launch of the former's new inhouse programs in January 2023. Starting January 29, 2023, its integrated Sunday programming, except for Healing Mass sa Veritas (simulcast from DZRV-AM) and Word of God Network, was axed and replaced it with new additional music programming. Starting May 2023, Radyo5 added new music blocks to its Saturday programming.

=== 2024–present: Favorite Music Radio ===
FM Radio 92.3 station logo used from November 4, 2024 to July 12, 2026.

On October 26, 2024, Prime Media-owned Philippine Collective Media Corporation (PCMC) made an agreement with NBC/MediaQuest, wherein it will lease the frequency and eventually acquire most of NBC's radio assets, except for its stations in Cebu and Cagayan de Oro, thereby introducing PCMC's Favorite Music Radio to the Mega Manila market.

On November 4, 2024, at 5:00 AM, Favorite Music Radio 92.3 began its official broadcast with programming emanating from Diliman, Quezon City. Good Vibes Morning is its inaugural program on the station, with a relay simulcast on most NBC regional stations.

From January 6 to November 14, 2025, and from April 13, 2026 up to July 10, 2026, it is airing a simulcast of Arangkada Balita from PRTV Prime Media.

By July 13, 2026, the branding was shortened to 92.3 FMR.

On November 9, 2026, FMR began simulcasting True FM's flagship morning radio show, Ted Failon at DJ Chacha sa True FM.

== Notable personalities ==
=== Current ===
- Ted Failon

=== Former ===
- Migs (2024–25)

== See also ==
- Nation Broadcasting Corporation
- ABS-CBN
- ABS-CBN Corporation
- DZMM TeleRadyo
- PRTV Prime Media
- ABS-CBN News
- DZMM Radyo Patrol 630
- MOR Entertainment
