= Radyo5 =

- Turkey
- Frequencies: 94.7 Istanbul; 101.8 Ankara; 106.3 İzmir and 20+ cities

Programming
- Format: CHR, Hit Music

Ownership
- Owner: TMSF

History
- First air date: 4 February 1997
- Last air date: 1 March 2011

Technical information
- Transmitter coordinates: Tepeüstü, Küçükçekmece, Istanbul

Links
- Webcast: http://www.radyo5.com.tr/canli.asp
- Website: http://www.radyo5.com.tr/

Radyo 5 is a Turkish national radio station playing CHR (contemporary hit radio) music. On 1 March 2011, it changed its name to Kral Pop Radyo. With the tender held on 26 April 2010, it was purchased by Cem Aydın, the General Manager of Doğuş Publishing Group, with an offer of $5.2 million.

== Radyo 5 DJ list ==
- Ayça Şen
- Nilgün Ayaz Mısırlığlu
- Öykü Serter
- Hakan Tamar
- Savaş Biner
- Erdal Şahin
- Ahmetcan Serin
- Merih Guzelarda

== Slogans ==
- We lead They Follow!
- It's Fresh
- The Big radio
- Today's Hit Music
