= AksyonTV =

Defunct free-to-air Television network in the Philippines

Aksyon TV
- Type: Terrestrial television network
- Branding: Aksyon TV
- Country: Philippines
- Availability: Defunct
- Founded: February 21, 2011; 15 years ago
- TV stations: List of AksyonTV stations
- Headquarters: TV5 Media Center, Reliance cor. Sheridan Sts., Mandaluyong, Metro Manila, Philippines
- Broadcast area: Nationwide
- Owner: PLDT Beneficial Trust Fund (MediaQuest Holdings)
- Parent: NBC (broadcast spectrum/license); TV5 Network, Inc. (programming and broadcast facilities)
- Key people: Manuel V. Pangilinan (Chairman, TV5 Network Inc./NBC); Chot Reyes (President and CEO, TV5 Network Inc.); Engr. Erwin V. Galang (Head, Regulatory and Industry Relations, NBC); Engr. Edward Benedict V. Galang (Network Engineering Operations, NBC)
- Launch date: February 21, 2011; 15 years ago (Philippines); July 2011; 15 years ago (international)
- Dissolved: January 12, 2019; 7 years ago (Philippines)
- Former names: MTV Philippines (2001–2007)
- Sister channels: TV5 Network
- Official website: www.news5.com.ph www.tv5.com.ph/aksyontv
- Language: Tagalog (main); English (secondary)
- Replaced by: 5 Plus (terrestrial television); One PH (pay television)

Aksyon TV (lit. 'action TV', visually rendered in all uppercase as AKSYONTV) was a Philippine free-to-air television network. It was a joint venture of NBC and TV5 Network, Inc. (international operations is under its subsidiary Pilipinas Global Network Ltd.), both under PLDT media arm MediaQuest Holdings. Its programs were primarily produced by TV5's divisions News5 and ESPN5. AksyonTV formerly broadcasts terrestrially through DWNB-TV (UHF channel 41) in Metro Manila, as well as on UHF channel 29 in Cebu, Davao and other relay stations, and on a digital subchannel via channel 5.2 in Metro Manila. It occupies the frequency previously used by MTV Philippines, a subsidiary of MTV Networks Asia Pacific from 2001 to 2006.

Named after TV5's newscast, Aksyon, it started broadcasting on February 21, 2011, as an all-news channel, with simulcasts from Radyo5 and independently produced newscasts from News5. It has also carried-over sports coverages due to shutdown of sports primetime block AKTV on May 31, 2013, due to high airtime costs and low ratings caused by IBC's impending privatization. Its main broadcast facilities are located at TV5 Media Center, Reliance cor. Sheridan Sts., Mandaluyong. It was the first and only 24-hour news channel on free-to-air TV and the first 24-hour Tagalog language news channel until December 1, 2013. It formerly operates daily from 5:00 AM to 12:00 MN.

The program line-up of AksyonTV also includes news analysis, documentaries and talk shows, as well as entertainment and other news and sports-related programs.

On November 30, 2018, TV5 Network announced that AksyonTV would be rebranded as 5 Plus on January 13, 2019, with its programs consisting mostly of sport events. AksyonTV silently ended its broadcast on January 12, 2019, with ESPN5's Heavy Hitters as its last program to air on the network. AksyonTV International continues to broadcast after the rebrand.

== History ==
Originally, local UHF channel 41 was intended to broadcast local programming under the supervision of Nation Broadcasting Corporation. Sometime in 2000, MTV Networks Asia Pacific, operator of MTV (Music Television) brand in Asia wanted to transmit its music channel on terrestrial television in the Philippines. Eventually, MTV Networks Asia Pacific entered into an agreement with Nation Broadcasting Corporation to transmit its localize music channel via its UHF channel and started broadcasting MTV Philippines on January 1, 2001, until the partnership ended on February 15, 2007.

In March 2010 MediaQuest Holdings, a PLDT subsidiary, the Philippines' largest telecommunication company, announced the acquisition of ABC Development Corporation, broadcaster of TV5 from the joint consortium led by former PLDT Chairman Antonio "Tonyboy" O. Cojuangco Jr. and Malaysian media conglomerate Media Prima Berhad.

In October 2010, through its flagship station, it took over the management of Nation Broadcasting Corporation and its radio and television businesses, particularly 92.3 News FM and UHF channel 41. Consequently, UHF channel 41 went on air and began its initial test broadcast of its radio station 92.3 News FM from 12:00 noon to 8:00 p.m. (Philippine Standard Time, UTC+8). In December 2010, ABC Development Corporation announced plans to launch its own news and sport-related channel. On February 21, 2011, AksyonTV started its commercial broadcast launched as TV5 introduced the new UHF channel. was launched at exactly 4 am, airing its first program, Andar ng Mga Balita, hosted by Martin Andanar, which was a simulcast of the morning news program on Radyo5 News FM of the same title.

On June 3, 2013, several sports programs from IBC 13's defunct blocktimer AKTV were carried over to AksyonTV. This was done by the TV5 Network, Inc. management after the deal expired on May 31, 2013. News and public affairs programs were either moved to a new timeslot or canceled.

Since December 2013, AksyonTV removed its 24-hour broadcasting activities due to cost-cutting measures by the management as well as NTC's rules and regulations for affiliated free-to-air TV stations.

Since the 2014 Sochi Winter Olympics, AksyonTV is one of the official Olympics broadcasters in the Philippines, together with TV5 and Cignal.

Since July 21, 2014, AksyonTV ceased producing any independent newscasts including news advisories (e.g. Aksyon Breaking, Aksyon Weather). This was done after TV5 unified all of its newscasts under the Aksyon brand.

Since October 2015, AksyonTV dropped its simulcast of the PBA games after the move of the Filsports Basketball Association from PTV as part of PTV-4 reorganization and the taped airing of the PCBL and other PSL games on the same network every weeknights and weekends.

In January 2016, AksyonTV further improved its sports programming, starting the year with the return of the PBA D-League on Sports5 and being the second home of the UFC (including The Ultimate Fighter) and the PGA tour after its parent network TV5 and satellite channel Hyper.

By December 19, 2016, AksyonTV moved from Cignal Channel 1 to Channel 6.

In 2017, as Chot Reyes become president and CEO of TV5 Network Inc., AksyonTV began to shift as a complement sister station of TV5, as the network started airing reruns of American series that air or aired on the station, including Arrow and Supernatural, as well as Movie Max 5 block and home shopping in lieu of live sports programming. In December of the same year, the channel also added classic TV5 local programming. The network also expanded its broadcast hours till 1:00 am on selected days. The practice being similar to rival GMA News TV was also heavily criticized by viewers, putting news programs and coverage on-hold for these kind of programming. As a complement, Cignal, a sister company of TV5, launched its 24-hour satellite news channel, One News which combines news content of the media companies owned by MediaQuest, including News5 on May 28, 2018.

On November 30, 2018, the channel was teased to rebrand as 5 Plus (now One Sports as of 2020). The network's programming is primarily sports, with additional coverage from ESPN5, along with sports-related content which will target millennials. 5 Plus also competes with rival S+A (inactive since May 5, 2020 due to issue on ABS-CBN's broadcast franchise), which carries the same format. Selected Radyo5 simulcast programs later moved to a new stand-alone satellite channel One PH, at the satellite service, Cignal. Public service program Buhay OFW and home shopping block EZ Shop are the only non-sports programs from AksyonTV to be carried to 5 Plus (both of which were eventually cancelled by Q2 2019). The channel cease its broadcast on January 13, 2019.

== Final programming ==
AksyonTV was presented in English and Tagalog languages. Programming was distributed equally between newscasts, sports (since June 2013 after the expiration of MediaQuest-IBC 13 blocktime agreement), live coverage of important news events, and talk shows. AksyonTV's programs also comprised a combination of live news reports, documentaries and current affairs. Its lineup of programming draws upon TV5's own resources and its news partners. It also aired programs simulcast from Radyo5 92.3 News FM (now FM Radio Philippines and 105.9 True FM) and news programs of TV5.

After cancellation of AKTV on IBC 13 sports block, all sports programs of AKTV and Sports5 (now One Sports) were moved to AksyonTV. The channel also started aired foreign entertainment programs that aired on TV5 from 2017 until January 31, 2019, though it is only considered as filler to the network's programming.

== AksyonTV International ==
AksyonTV International
- Country: Philippines
- Broadcast area: International
- Network: AksyonTV (now as separate channels 5 Plus/One Sports, One PH and True TV)
- Headquarters: TV5 Media Center, Reliance cor. Sheridan Sts., Mandaluyong, Metro Manila, Philippines

Programming
- Languages: Tagalog; English
- Picture format: 720p/1080i HDTV (downscaled to 16:9 480i/576i for the SDTV feed)

Ownership
- Owner: TV5 Network
- Parent: Pilipinas Global Network, Ltd.
- Sister channels: TV5; RPTV; One Sports; Kapatid International; PBA Rush

History
- Launched: July 2011; 15 years ago

Links
- Website: www.kapatidinternational.com

AksyonTV International is an international Philippine subscription television channel owned by Pilipinas Global Network, Ltd. The channel offers programming highlights from the Philippine television channels TV5, RPTV, One Sports, One News, One Sports+, One PH, True TV, PBA Rush and UAAP Varsity Channel.

It was announced in early 2011 that it would launch an international channel to support AksyonTV's local presence. In July 2011, Pilipinas Global Network Ltd., a company owned by PLDT, Inc. and TV5 Network Inc. based in British Virgin Islands will oversee the operation of AksyonTV International. The news channel will be primarily accessible to viewers in the Middle East, North Africa and some parts in Europe and North America. Despite the closure of its domestic network on January 13, 2019, Aksyon TV International remains operational; airing local sports and public affairs programs from One Sports and True FM simulcasts - now airing in One PH and True TV, two of the "teleradyo" domestic satellite TV channels.

== Controversy ==
On March 16, 2011, ABC Development Corporation (TV5) and Nation Broadcasting Corporation (NBC) filed a complaint to the local regulator in the Philippines, the National Telecommunications Commission against Sky Cable Corporation, one of ABS-CBN Corporation subsidiaries, broadcaster of ABS-CBN and TV5's competitor. In its complaint, ABC and NBC criticized SkyCable for its inaction to the request of the latter and subsequently non-inclusion of AksyonTV to its lineup, despite local laws instructing all cable and satellite companies operating in the Philippines to carry all free-to-air networks. Under Memorandum Circular 4-08-88 (or otherwise known as the “Must Carry Rule”), all entities in the cable and satellite businesses are required to include all free-to-air channels on its system regardless of its capabilities. SkyCable on the other hand revoke its compliance to the order due to system capacity and will conform once an additional facility is in place. On April 1, 2011, SkyCable announces the inclusion of AksyonTV on its channel lineup effective May 4, 2011, but made it earlier on April 30, four days from the planned May 4 launch. In July 2011, it was moved from Channel 61 to Channel 59 on SkyCable.

== See also ==
- TV5
- 105.9 True FM
- One News
- One PH - the spiritual successor of Aksyon TV on pay TV
- True TV - another spiritual successor of Aksyon TV on pay TV
- Nation Broadcasting Corporation
- List of analog television stations in the Philippines
- Mass media in the Philippines
