= One News (TV channel) =

Pay television news channel in the Philippines

- All sides, All the time.
- Country: Philippines
- Network: TV5 Network Inc. Philstar Media Group
- Affiliates: TV5; One Sports; RPTV; The Philippine Star; BusinessWorld; Bloomberg Television
- Headquarters: News5 (main studio); TV5 Media Center, Reliance cor. Sheridan Sts., Mandaluyong City , The Philippine Star; 202 Roberto S. Oca St. cor Railroad St. Port Area, Manila, BusinessWorld; 95 Balete Drive Extension, Brgy. Kristong Hari, New Manila, Quezon City, Metro Manila, Philippines

Programming
- Languages: English (Main ) Filipino (Secondary)
- Picture format: 720p/1080i HDTV (downscaled to 16:9 480i for the SDTV feed)

Ownership
- Owner: Cignal TV, Inc. (MediaQuest Holdings)
- Sister channels: Kapatid Channel; One PH; One Sports+; PBA Rush; NBA TV Philippines; UAAP Varsity Channel

History
- Launched: May 28, 2018; 8 years ago
- Former names: Bloomberg TV Philippines (2015–2018)

Links
- Website: onenews.ph

Availability

Terrestrial
- Cignal TV (Nationwide): Channel 8 (SD); Channel 250 (HD)
- SatLite (Nationwide): Channel 60

Streaming media
- Cignal Play: Available on the Cignal Play website or via mobile application

One News (stylized as "one news") is a 24/7 Philippine pay television news channel owned by MediaQuest Holdings through its subsidiary Cignal TV. It was launched in May 2018 exclusively on satellite provider Cignal. One News is the first MediaQuest channel launched under the One branding (presently known as the One Network Media Group), along with the free TV sports channel One Sports, cable sports channel One Sports+, Tagalog -language news channel One PH, lifestyle portal One Life, and now-defunct premium entertainment channel One Screen.

It is an aggrupation of the news division units within the MediaQuest group, namely TV5 Network's News5 division and the Philstar Media Group's newspapers The Philippine Star and BusinessWorld.

== History ==
Before its launch, the channel was known as Bloomberg TV Philippines, which was a joint venture of Bloomberg L.P., Cignal TV, and TV5 Network.

Logo used from May 28, 2018, until March 7, 2020

On May 28, 2018, Cignal TV formally launched One News, an English-language news channel featuring content from the news divisions of the MediaQuest group (News5, The Philippine Star, and BusinessWorld), Bloomberg TV Philippines, and Probe Productions. It retained most of the programs played on its predecessor.

In 2019, TV5 began airing selected programs from One News, such as Agenda with Cito Beltran and The Chiefs. In addition, the channel launched a dedicated news website, which is currently managed by the PhilStar Media Group.

On March 17, 2020, One News, along with One PH, temporarily suspended its regular programming due to the island-wide "enhanced community quarantine" against COVID-19 in Luzon. The news channel aired a special edition of One News Now.

== Programming ==
One News program lineup includes national newscasts, talk shows, business newscasts, and public affairs shows. Several programs from Bloomberg Television, One PH, True TV, One Sports, and PBA Rush, along with third-party content partners (including NewsWatch Plus, ABS-CBN and Probe Productions), also air on the channel. Some programs can also be seen for free via TV5, RPTV, ALLTV2 and A2Z, as well as internationally through Kapatid Channel and AksyonTV International.

== Current programs ==
=== News ===
- Morning Matters (2025–present)
- News and Views (2025–present)
- One Balita Pilipinas (2020–present, also aired on One PH, True FM, and True TV)
- One NewsFeed (2026–present)
- One News Now (2018–present)
- The Big Story (Note: also aired on Kapatid Channel (international).) (2016–present, formerly aired on Bloomberg TV Philippines, TV5, 2019, and One PH, 2024)

=== Talk ===
- Infinite Legacies
- The View from Manila (2023)
- Thought Leaders with Cathy Yang (2023)
- Political Beat (2026–present)
- Round Table (2023)
- Sa Totoo Lang (2026–present; also aired on One PH, True FM, True TV, and Kapatid Channel)
- Safe House (2024)
- Storycon (2024–present, also aired on One PH, True FM and True TV)
- The Medyo Serious Talk Show (2024)

=== Business ===
- Money Talks with Cathy Yang (2025)

=== Sports ===
- Play by Play (2024–2026, also aired on RPTV, One Sports and One Sports+)
- Starting Lineup (2025, also aired on RPTV, One Sports and One Sports+)
- Homestretch (2025, produced by Rappler)

=== Documentary ===
- Bright Ideas (2016; formerly aired on Bloomberg TV Philippines)
- Chronicles (2018)
- One News Archives
- One News Documentaries (2019; also aired on One PH)
- Probe Archives
- Story of Our Islands
- The Long Take

=== Infotainment ===
- Afternoon Delight (2024–2026)
- #RidePH with Jay Taruc (also aired on TV5, RPTV and One PH)
- CHInoyTV (2024–2025, co-produced by Fil-Chi Media Productions)
- Change Makers
- Go Local
- The Men's Room (2023; also aired on TV5 and RPTV)
- The Final Pitch (2024–2025)

=== Lifestyle ===
- DiscoverEats (also aired on TV5 and One PH)
- From Helen's Kitchen (also aired on TV5, RPTV and One PH)
- MomBiz (also aired on One PH)
- Presello
- Recreate (2021)
- The Philippine Star's Modern Living (formerly aired on ABS-CBN News Channel)

=== Acquired programming ===
- Bloomberg Green
- Bloomberg Wealth
- David Rubenstein Show
- Game Changers
- Hello World
- Leaders with Lacqua
- Sa INC
- Studio 1.0
- What Can Be Saved?

== One News Now ==
One News
- Genre: News broadcasting
- Created by: Cignal TV
- Country of origin: Philippines
- Original languages: English (Main); Filipino (for MOJO: Mobile Journo)

Production
- Production locations: TV5 Media Center, Reliance cor. Sheridan Sts., Mandaluyong
- Camera setup: Multiple-camera setup
- Running time: 3-20 minutes
- Production company: News5

Original release
- Network: One News (May 28, 2018–December 31, 2023; May 20, 2024–present); TV5 (March 17–October 4, 2020)
- Release: May 28, 2018 – present

One News Now served as a replacement for both Rush (formerly Rush Hour) and One Newsroom on One News starting March 17, 2020 due to the enhanced community quarantine caused by the COVID-19 pandemic. It resumed broadcast on May 20, 2024, this time as an hourly news bulletin.

=== Current Anchor ===
- Pauline Verzosa (2024–present)

=== Former Anchors ===
- Denise Tan (Afternoon and Evening Edition, and Sports)
- Mon Gualvez
- Jove Francisco
- Angela Laguzad (2023)
- Danie Laurel
- Chiqui Vergel
- Maricel Halili
- Francis Orcio
- Charles Lejano
- Rizza Diaz
- Cheryl Cosim (2020)
- Ed Lingao (2020)
- Jes Delos Santos (2023)
- Diego Castro (2023)
- Shawn Yao (2023; Sports)

== See also ==
- TV5
- AksyonTV (defunct channel)
- News5
- One PH
- RPTV
- Bloomberg TV Philippines (defunct channel)
- CNN Philippines (defunct channel)
- ABS-CBN News Channel
- Bilyonaryo News Channel
