= TV5 News (Philippines) =

News and public affairs division of TV5 Network

TV5 News and Current Affairs (TV5 News)
- Division of: TV5 Network
- Country: Philippines
- Area served: Worldwide
- Key people: Patrick Paez (Vice President and Head); Jackie Sierda (Assistant Vice President, News Operations); Mary Grace Navarro (Assistant Vice President, News Production); Jay Cesora Orense (Head, Public Affairs Unit); Cherry Bayle (OIC-Station Manager, True FM); Ed Lingao (Chief of Reporters)
- Headquarters: TV5 Media Center, Reliance corner Sheridan Streets, Barangay Highway Hills, Mandaluyong, Metro Manila, Philippines
- Former names: ABC News and Public Affairs (1992–2008); TV5 News and Public Affairs (2008–2010); TV5 News and Information (2010–2024); News5 (on-air branding, 2010–2026)
- Predecessor: Nine Media News and Current Affairs (2011–2024)
- Language: Tagalog (main); English (secondary, used for One News)
- Website: news.tv5.com.ph

TV5 News and Current Affairs (formerly ABC News and Public Affairs, TV5 News and Public Affairs and later TV5 News and Information), also known on-air as TV5 News (formerly News5), is the news and public affairs division of the Philippine media company TV5 Network Inc.

News5 logo, a variant of 2015 logo, used from 2021 to 2026; currently as secondary logo since 2026

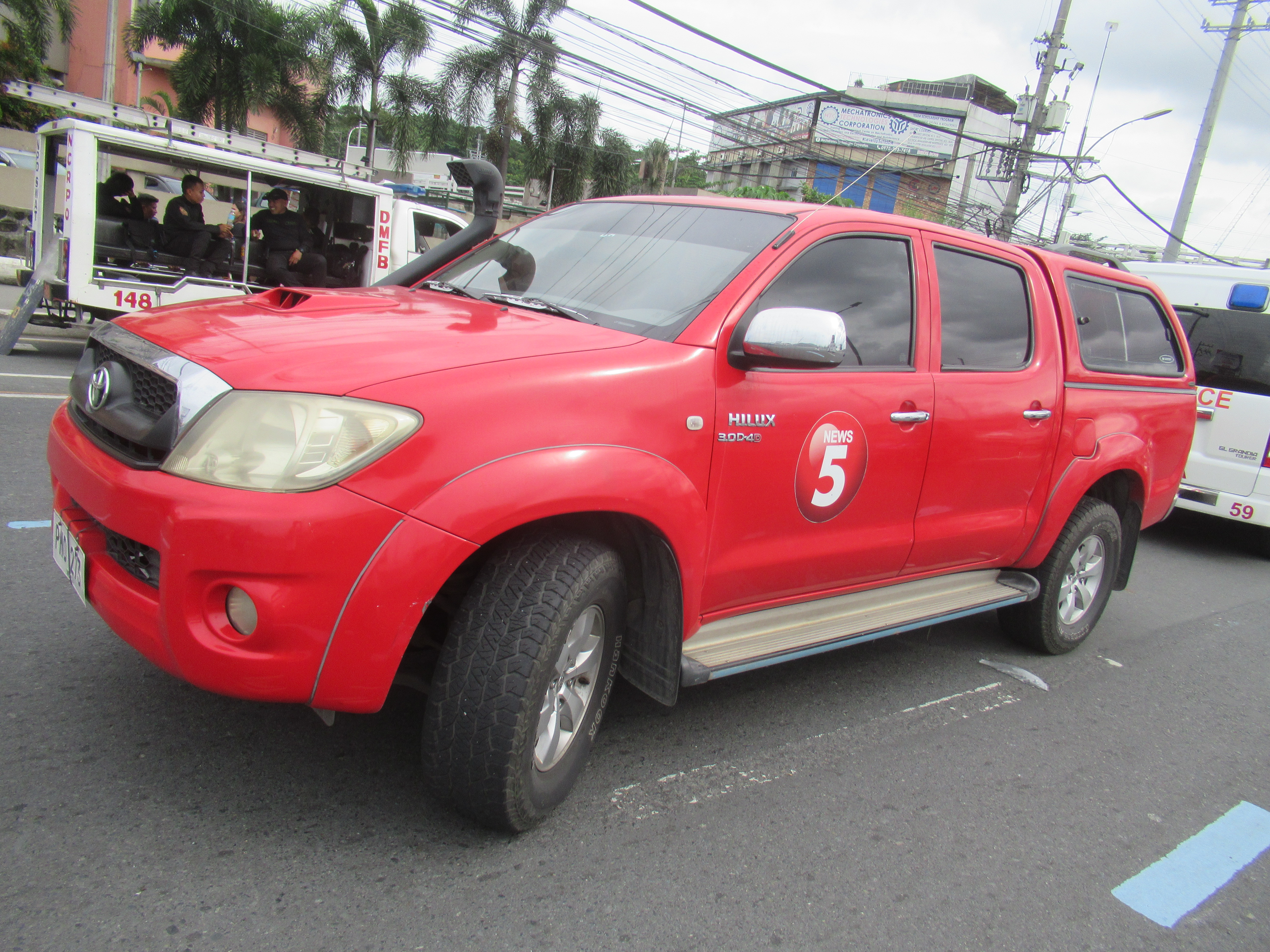
News5 broadcasting vehicle

TV5 News generates news, infotainment, and entertainment output for TV5's media assets including its namesake network, RPTV, and other television stations, radio through the True FM network, cable television through One News and One PH, internationally through Kapatid International, AksyonTV, and news websites news5.com.ph and InterAksyon (part of the PhilStar Group). Luchi Cruz-Valdes served as News5 and Public Affairs department chief since 2009 until her retirement on September 30, 2024.

== Programs ==
=== Currently aired ===
==== TV5 ====
- Frontline Pilipinas (2020–present)

==== RPTV ====
- Frontline Pilipinas (2024–present)
- Ted Failon at DJ Chacha sa True FM (2024–present)
- Wanted sa Radyo (2024–present)

==== One PH ====
- Alagang Kapatid (2015–present)
- Cristy FerMinute (2011–present)
- Frontline Pilipinas (2020–present)
- One Balita Pilipinas (2020–present)
- Ted Failon at DJ Chacha sa True FM (2020–present)
- Wanted sa Radyo (2011–present)

==== One News ====
- The Big Story

==== Defunct regional newscasts ====
- Aksyon Bisaya (TV5 Cebu)
- Aksyon Dabaw (TV5 Davao)

== See also ==
- TV5
- List of TV5 (Philippine TV network) original programming
- One Sports
- List of programs broadcast by One Sports
- RPTV
- One News
- One PH
- List of programs broadcast by True FM/One PH
- 105.9 True FM
- Nine Media News and Current Affairs
