= One PH =

Philippine television channel

- One PH logo since 2020
- Country: Philippines
- Broadcast area: Philippines
- Network: TV5 Network; Philstar Media Group
- Affiliates: TV5; One Sports; RPTV; 105.9 True FM; Pilipino Star Ngayon; PM: Pang-Masa; The Freeman; Banat
- Headquarters: True FM Studios, TV5 Media Center, Reliance cor. Sheridan Sts., Mandaluyong City, Metro Manila, Philippines

Programming
- Languages: Tagalog (main); English (secondary); Cebuano (during One Balita Bai)
- Picture format: 720p/1080i HDTV (downscaled to 16:9 480i for the SDTV feed)

Ownership
- Owner: Cignal TV, Inc. (MediaQuest Holdings)
- Sister channels: Kapatid Channel; One News; One Sports+ PBA Rush; Sari-Sari Channel (closure); BuKo (closure); NBA TV Philippines; UAAP Varsity Channel; True TV (closure); WilTV (closure)

History
- Launched: January 13, 2019; 7 years ago (test broadcast); February 18, 2019; 7 years ago (soft launch); July 31, 2019; 7 years ago (official launch)
- Replaced: Catsup (TV5 DTT sub-channel space); AksyonTV (Cignal TV channel space)
- Replaced by: RPTV (TV5 DTT sub-channel space)
- Former names: AksyonTV (2011–2019)

Links
- Website: cignal.tv/one-ph

Availability

Terrestrial
- Cignal TV (Nationwide): Channel 1
- SatLite (Nationwide): Channel 1

Streaming media
- Cignal Play: Available on the Cignal Play website or via mobile application

One PH (also one Ph) is a 24/7 Tagalog teleradio news channel—owned by MediaQuest Holdings, Inc.—that officially launched on July 31, 2019, on satellite provider Cignal. One PH can also be seen in Mega Manila via Sulit TV and other digital terrestrial television (DTT) set-top boxes on channel 51.

One PH is the fifth MediaQuest channel launched under the "One" branding (known as the One Network Media Group), along with the English-language news channel One News, cable sports channel One Sports+, free TV sports channel One Sports, and now-defunct premium entertainment channel One Screen.

One PH is a joint partnership between MVP Group's Pilipino Star Ngayon and its sister tabloids, PM: Pang Masa (national), The Freeman (regional), and Banat by The Freeman (regional), as well as 105.9 True FM and News5. (Pilipino Star Ngayon is a sister Filipino tabloid to the English The Philippine Star.)

== History ==
AksyonTV was rebranded into all-sports network 5 Plus on January 13, 2019, causing Radyo5 programs that were simulcast on AksyonTV to be moved to the then-unnamed channel. 5 Plus had taken over DWNB-TV's terrestrial (analog) TV space and now moved to Cignal channel 15. But on January 17, 2019, just four days after the move, the Radyo5 simulcast channel was reassigned from channel 6 to channel 1, temporarily replacing Cignal's community promotion channel. 5 Plus later took over channel 6, but it continued simulcasting on channel 15 until February 17, 2019.

One PH was soft-launched on February 18, 2019, reverting its Cignal channel assignment from channel 1 back to channel 6. At the same time, Radyo5 unveiled its refurbished studios and announced new content to be added to the program line-ups of both Radyo5 and One PH.

On July 31, 2019, One PH was formally launched by Cignal TV as a 24/7 all-Tagalog news, public affairs, and entertainment channel with three blocks: NewsKom (newscasts and talk shows); KKK (public service and infotainment); and SnS (showbiz and sports).

In August 2019, selected Radyo5 and One PH programs began airing on either a simulcast or delayed basis on TV5 as part of a programming revamp. These programs included Morning Calls, One Balita, One Balita Pilipinas, Wag Po!, and Turbo Time with Mike and Lindy.

On March 8, 2020, One PH was given a slightly revamped look, along with One News and the rebranded One Sports and One Sports+. One PH replaced the community promotion channel on Cignal channel 1, while One Sports launched as a free-to-air channel replacing 5 Plus on channel 6.

On March 17, 2020, One PH and One News temporarily suspended their regular programming during the Luzon-wide "enhanced community quarantine" in response to the COVID-19 pandemic, with the news channel airing a special edition of One News Now.

On May 22, 2020, One PH began conducting successful test transmissions on digital terrestrial television via DWET-TV subchannel 5.3 in Mega Manila. This development marked the reinstatement of Radyo5's "RadyoVision" format on free-to-air television after its predecessor, AksyonTV, had carried over most of the radio station's programs from 2011 to 2019. Starting in mid-2021, this arrangement would also spread to other cities in the Philippines in preparation for the launch of the network's DTTB service Sulit TV.

In December 2020, Cignal TV and Philstar Media Group took over the operations and programming, respectively, of Radyo5. With this development, some of the station's programs aired final episodes during the last weeks of December 2020. On January 1, 2021, One PH's programming was integrated into the programming schedule of Radyo5, with the exception of the overnight slots.

On January 1, 2021, all programs on One PH were simulcast on One Sports via live streaming on its website, joining Radyo5 92.3 News FM's live streaming there, with the exception of its overnight slots. The livestream later reverted to One Sports a few days later.

On February 1, 2024, One PH was removed from TV5's digital TV subchannel lineup and was replaced by the mirror feed of RPTV, a joint venture of TV5 and Nine Media/RPN that replaced CNN Philippines on analog TV channel 9 and digital TV channel 19. However, selected programming from One PH was carried over to RPTV, and this programming remains available on Cignal and Streamtech-owned Planet Cable, as well as on other cable and satellite TV operators nationwide.

On August 29, 2026, One PH made a return to digital free TV after a nearly two-and-a-half-year hiatus, albeit with just a test broadcast on channel 51.

== Programming ==
The majority of One PH's programming is sourced and simulcast from 105.9 True FM, a practice that was carried over from its predecessor AksyonTV as it followed suit with other Mega Manila news radio stations. The rest of One PH's programming is One PH original content and brokered programming, which are not aired but rather simulcast on Radyo5 (except for overnight slots) and ABS-CBN News' Rated Korina on PBA sa Radyo5 coverage days.

The integrated programming of Radyo5 and One PH ended with the launch of the former's new in-house programs. Starting on January 29, 2023, the station's integrated Sunday programming was canceled, except for Healing Mass sa Veritas and Word of God Network, to be replaced with new and additional music programming. Starting May 20, 2023 Radyo5 added new music blocks to its Saturday programming, and from July 1 until July 29, 2023, the noontime variety show program E.A.T. (now known as Eat Bulaga!) started to simulcast with TV5 until 1:00 pm on Mondays to Fridays and from 11:30 am to 2:30 pm on Saturdays.

== Personalities ==
- Ted Failon
- Julius Babao
- Cheryl Cosim
- Jove Francisco
- Jiggy Manicad
- Raffy Tulfo
- Christine Bersola-Babao
- Gus Abelgas
- Andrei Felix
- Jervy Grayson
- Marc Logan
- Lourd de Veyra
- Jay Taruc
- Korina Sanchez
- Laila Chikadora
- Mon Gualvez (voiceover)
- Noli Eala
- Manuel Mogato
- Stanley Chi
- Cristy Fermin
- Ces Drilon

== See also ==
- TV5
- One Sports
- 5 Plus (defunct)
- DWET-TV
- 105.9 True FM
- News5
- One News
- AksyonTV (defunct)
