= 2025 in Philippine television =

The following is a list of events affecting Philippine television in 2025. Events listed include television show debuts, finales, cancellations, and channel launches, closures and rebrandings, as well as information about controversies and carriage disputes.

== Events ==
=== January ===
- January 1
  - Cignal terminated two TAP Digital Media Ventures Corporation linear channels (Premier Football and TAP Edge) on its line-up due to the expiration of Cignal's contract with the said networks. Meanwhile, both channels continued to air on Cablelink, Converge Vision, G Sat, Sky Cable, and other cable and satellite providers as well as on its own streaming service Blast TV.
  - After a year and 4 months, One Media Network reverted to Golden Nation Network for its 2nd incarnation, along with its stations in Pampanga and Naga.
  - UNTV migrated its broadcast signal reception to digital terrestrial transmission from switching off its analog frequency in nationwide areas after 26 years.
- January 5 – All-Out Sundays celebrated its 5th anniversary on Philippine television.
- January 18 – Carmelle Collado from King Thomas Learning Academy Inc., Camarines Sur proclaimed as the Tawag ng Tanghalan: The School Showdown Grand Champion on It's Showtime.
- January 20 – After 8 years and 6 months, Pilipinas HD ended its broadcast operations (including its timesharing) by BEAM TV due to low ratings and programming redundancies, following Chino Trinidad's death on July 13, 2024. Meanwhile, D8TV (owned by Digital 8, Inc.) began its full broadcast operations on the same channel space.
- January 25 – ABS-CBN Regional officially resumed via A2Z as A2Z Regional brand to viewers in Central Visayas and Mindanao, as well as in Panay for the first time since the denial of ABS-CBN broadcast franchise on July 10, 2020, that led to the cessation of ABS-CBN-produced regional broadcasts on August 28, 2020.
- January 28 – In coinciding with the 20th anniversary on August 21, ABS-CBN Studios, through Banijay Asia and GMA Network, Inc. announced a historic collaboration deal for the longest-running reality competition show Pinoy Big Brother to produce seasons beginning with the Celebrity Collab Edition on March 9 and Celebrity Collab Edition 2.0 on October 25 on six ABS-CBN/GMA linear platforms (the main channel, Kapuso Stream, Kapamilya Online Live, iWant, GMA Pinoy TV and TFC.

=== February ===
- February 5 – ASAP celebrated its 30th anniversary of the longest-running musical variety show on Philippine television since it premiered in 1995.
- February 6 – Goin' Bulilit celebrated its 20th anniversary on Philippine television.
- February 16 – After 14 years and 10 months of its broadcast programming run, Aha! aired its final episode due to programming decision by the network to introduce a new educational show in weekend timeslot, making the longest-running infotainment on Philippine television.
- February 17 – Premier Football celebrated its 5th anniversary of broadcasting on cable television.
- February 21
  - 24 Oras Weekend celebrated its 15th anniversary on Philippine television.
  - The Movie and Television Review and Classification Board updated their digital on-screen graphic (or pictogram) and immediately appeared on all Philippine TV networks on-air and in teasers. All TV was the first channel to release it while on-air. It officially commenced on April 17.
- February 22 – The 700 Club Asia, CBN Asia's flagship program, celebrated its 30th anniversary of the longest-running Christian televangelist program on Philippine television since it premiered in 1995.

=== March ===
- March 1
  - Blast TV launched Blast Movies on Samsung TV Plus (FAST)/linear channel lineup.
  - GMA Network celebrated its 75th anniversary of establishment as a media company and radio network. Weng Dela Peña replaced Al Torres as a voice over of that network after over 30 years in service. Alongside the anniversary, the network launched their station ID with the motto "Forever One with the Filipino" on August 4 and aired during sign-on and sign-off activity retained their music "Isa sa Puso ng Pilipino" (lit. "One of the Heart of Filipino").
  - Headstart with Karen Davila celebrated its 15th anniversary on Philippine television.
  - Intercontinental Broadcasting Corporation celebrated its 65th anniversary of broadcasting.
  - Zeah Pala of Camiling, Tarlac proclaimed as the Showtime Sexy Babe 2025 grand winner on It's Showtime.
- March 3 – Solar Entertainment Corporation announced a deal with the Maharlika Pilipinas Basketball League for the league's official broadcasting rights succeeding 2-year stint with Cignal TV to aired games beginning with the 2025 MPBL season on March 8 on free-to-air and cable channel, Solar Sports, on a selected games only, while Facebook and YouTube handled all live games. Meanwhile, Cignal TV's Media Pilipinas TV (MPTV) continued to air until its closure on April 12.
- March 8
  - One Sports celebrated its 5th anniversary of broadcasting.
  - PCSO Lottery Draw celebrated its 30th anniversary of the longest-running multi-million lottery game show on Philippine television since it premiered in 1995.
- March 14
  - Voice of America ended its broadcast operations in the Philippines by the U.S. Agency for Global Media as U.S. President Donald Trump signed an executive order to reduce the functions of several agencies.
  - GMA Network's international channel, GMA Pinoy TV celebrated its 20th anniversary on global television.
- March 16 – Kapamilya Daily Mass celebrated its 5th anniversary on Philippine television.
- March 28
  - Pepito Manaloto celebrated its 15th anniversary on Philippine television.
  - TNT Tropang Giga clinched the 2024–25 PBA Commissioner's Cup title after defeating Barangay Ginebra San Miguel 4–3 in a winner-take-all seven-game series at the Araneta Coliseum.

=== April ===
- April 1
  - Cignal launched PRTV Prime Media on their line-up.
  - Zee Entertainment Enterprises formally relaunched Zee Sine, a movie channel featuring Bollywood/Indian movies dubbed in Filipino, thru Samsung TV Plus as a FAST/linear channel.
- April 9 – Philippine Basketball Association celebrated its 50th founding anniversary with double-header games held at the Rizal Memorial Coliseum. In the second game, the league featured the old graphics and bugs on RPTV that used since it established in 1975, including the momentary switched of video quality from colored to black and white.
- April 3 – Word for the Season celebrated its 5th anniversary on Philippine television.
- April 12
  - After 2 years of its broadcasting, Media Pilipinas TV (MPTV) has ceased its operations by Cignal and SatLite due to programming redundancies, lack of advertising support and cross-cutting measures as well as the latter's contract with the network expired after Maharlika Pilipinas Basketball League transferred to Solar Entertainment Corporation's Solar Sports on March 8.
  - Ice Almeria of Manila proclaimed as Grand Champion of Time to Dance.
  - The Petro Gazz Angels clinched the 2024–25 Premier Volleyball League All-Filipino Conference title after defeating the Creamline Cool Smashers 2–1 in winner take-all game 3 of the best-of-three finals series held at the PhilSports Arena in Pasig.
- April 23 – Net 25, the television network of Iglesia ni Cristo-affiliated company Eagle Broadcasting Corporation, celebrated its 25th anniversary of broadcasting.
- April 26 – Marko Rudio (from San Nicolas, Pangasinan) of Team Agimat proclaimed as the Tawag ng Tanghalan: All-Star Grand Resbak 2025 Grand Champion on It's Showtime.

=== May ===
- May 5 – In coinciding with its 4th anniversary on July 26, ZOE Broadcasting Network's late-night newscast, Balitang A2Z, began its simulcast on Light TV that marked the return of the channel's original broadcasting hours (later extended from 6:00 am to 12:00 mn on October 1) after almost 5 years of limited hours due the COVID-19 pandemic on July 6, 2020. On December 15, the channel has switched its airing of aspect ratio format quality on the channel feed and its programming to high-definition (16:9) as being converted its mitigation of reception through digital signal reception through free TV and other cable and satellite providers after 19 years and 7 months on the usage of broadcast video picture resolution that migrated from standard-definition (4:3).
- May 12–13 – All Philippine TV networks had their special coverage of the 2025 elections.
- May 14 – The NU Lady Bulldogs clinched the UAAP Season 87 women's volleyball championship title after defeating the De La Salle Lady Spikers 2–0 in the best-of-three-game series held at the SM Mall of Asia Arena in Pasay.
- May 17 – The NU Bulldogs clinched the UAAP Season 87 men's volleyball championship title after defeating the FEU Tamaraws 3–0 in winner take-all game 3 of the best-of-three finals series held at the SM Mall of Asia Arena in Pasay.
- May 22 – The Arellano Chiefsquad clinched the NCAA Season 100 cheerleading competition championship title held at the SM Mall of Asia Arena in Pasay. This was their sixth consecutive title.
- May 23 – TAP Digital Media Ventures Corporation launched and distributed Paramount+ as a content hub on the Blast TV service in September after the latter signed content licensing and distribution agreement with Paramount Global Content Distribution.
- May 24–31 – The 2025 Palarong Pambansa took place at the Laoag, Ilocos Norte. On May 2, MediaQuest Holdings (Cignal TV) and their sister companies PLDT-Smart Communications awarded the rights to the annual games that aired on four free-to-air/cable and satellite/online linear platforms (One Sports, One Sports+, Cignal Play and Pilipinas Live).
- May 29 – TeleRadyo Serbisyo officially reverted to its original name, DZMM TeleRadyo, including its radio counterpart that marked the return on-air and online after 5 years due to the lapsed of its franchise in 2020 as part of a wider rebranding effort by its owners, Philippine Collective Media Corporation and operated by Media Serbisyo Production Corporation, a joint venture between Prime Media Holdings and ABS-CBN.
- May 31 – Cignal launched its first OTT streaming media aggregator in the Philippines, Cignal Super. In addition, they launched 3 streaming medias: Curiosity Stream, Fuse+ and Hallmark+.

=== June ===
- June 1
  - After 8 years and 7 months, Life TV ended its commercial operations by BEAM TV due to programming redundancies, lack of advertising support and cross-cutting measures, with most of their programs already moved to its digital service, 4th Watch Media.
  - Bro. Eddie Villanueva Classics celebrated its 5th anniversary on Philippine television.
- June 3–4 – Samsung TV Plus launched two FAST/linear channels on their line-up by respective date: Bilyonaryo News Channel on June 3; and Abante TV on June 4.
- June 4 – MediaQuest Holdings, through TV5 Network and Pentecostal Missionary Church of Christ (4th Watch) sealed a content partnership to air their flagship program Oras ng Katotohanan on August 17 on TV5. It also marked the return on Philippine television after 7 years on hiatus since it previously aired on Intercontinental Broadcasting Corporation from October 18, 1991, to 1995 and returned from March 12, 2001, to February 18, 2018, Southern Broadcasting Network from 2004 to December 30, 2007, and People's Television Network from August 11, 2013, to June 29, 2018.
- June 6 – Ito Ang Balita Weekend Edition celebrated its 5th anniversary on Philippine television.
- June 11
  - The Arellano Chiefs clinched the NCAA Season 100 men's volleyball championship title after defeating the Letran Knights 2–0 in a best-of-three-game series at the Playtime Filoil Centre in San Juan, Metro Manila. It was also the team's first victory in the NCAA volleyball championships since they joined the league in 2009.
  - The Benilde Lady Blazers clinched the NCAA Season 100 women's volleyball championship title after defeating the Letran Lady Knights 2–0 in a best-of-three-game series at the Playtime Filoil Centre in San Juan, Metro Manila.
- June 12
  - After almost 5 years, ABS-CBN's over-the-top media service and production company, iWantTFC softly reverted to its former name, iWant, on Smart TV. It officially commenced on July 9.
  - Pinoy M.D. celebrated its 15th anniversary on Philippine television.
- June 13 – Kapamilya Channel celebrated its 5th anniversary of broadcasting on cable and satellite television.
- June 19 – TV5 celebrated its 65th anniversary of corporate formation and broadcasting.
- June 20 – SatLite launched True TV on their line-up.
- June 21 – Kids Church celebrated its 5th anniversary on Philippine television.
- June 22 – Ricardo Cadavero (aka. Cardong Trumpo), Trompo spinner from Dasmariñas, Cavite, proclaimed as the seventh season Grand winner of Pilipinas Got Talent. The grand finals were held at the Solaire Resort Entertainment City in Parañaque.
- June 23 – Iskoolmates celebrated its 10th anniversary on Philippine television.
- June 29
  - Heart of Asia Channel celebrated its 5th anniversary of broadcasting.
  - Radio Philippines Network celebrated its 65th anniversary of broadcasting.
- June 30 – MediaQuest Holdings, through Cignal TV and their sister companies PLDT-Smart Communications sealed another 5-year deal with the University Athletic Association of the Philippines to aired the games from season 89 to 93 on five free-to-air/cable and satellite/online linear platforms (One Sports, UAAP Varsity Channel, Cignal Play, Cignal Super and Pilipinas Live) ahead of their expiration of the current five-year deal after season 88 concluded in 2026.

=== July ===
- July 5 – Brent Manalo of Tarlac & Mika Salamanca of Pampanga (BreKa) proclaimed as the Big Winner Duo of Pinoy Big Brother: Celebrity Collab Edition.
- July 9 – Warner Bros. Discovery Asia-Pacific reverted Max service to its former name, HBO Max, in the Southeast Asian region, including the Philippines.
- July 20 - MediaQuest Holdings (Cignal TV, Radio Philippines Network and TV5 Network, Inc.), TAP Digital Media Ventures Corporation and their sister company PLDT awarded the rights of the boxing match between Manny Pacquiao and American boxer Mario Barrios, billed as the "Pacquiao Returns", which took place at the MGM Grand Garden Arena in Las Vegas, Nevada in United States that aired on free-to-air networks, TV5, RPTV and One Sports, and on the cable and satellite channel Blast Sports, One Sports+, Premier Football, Premier Sports, Premier Sports 2, TAP Action Flix and TAP Sports. The boxing match was also aired live on pay-per-view through Cignal, SatLite, Sky Cable, Cablelink and Vision/FiberTV, and online through Cignal Play, iWant Tickets and Pilipinas Live.
- July 22 – Pera Paraan celebrated its 5th anniversary on Philippine television.
- July 24 – Samsung TV Plus launched Real Blast on their line-up.
- July 25 – The San Miguel Beermen clinched the 2025 PBA Philippine Cup after defeating TNT Tropang 5G 4–2 in a best-of-seven-game series at the PhilSports Arena in Pasig.
- July 31
  - NBA TV Philippines celebrated its 5th anniversary of broadcasting on cable television.
  - Sky Cable terminated five channels on their line-up: Animal Planet, Eurosport, Food Network, TLC and Travel Channel due to the expiration of Sky's contracts with the channels. Meanwhile, the channels continued to air via Cablelink, Cignal and other cable and satellite providers.

=== August ===
- August 2 – TCL Smart TV launched two channels on their line-up: Abante TV and Bilyonaryo News Channel.
- August 3 – Shanen Garciso of Talisay City, Cebu proclaimed as Ultimate Bida-Oke Star third season grand winner of Sing Galing!.
- August 5–18 – The 2025 FIBA Asia Cup took place at Jeddah in Saudi Arabia. MediaQuest Holdings, through Cignal TV and MVP Group of Companies, and their sister companies PLDT-Smart Communications awarded the rights to the games that airs on six free-to-air/cable and satellite/online linear platforms (RPTV, One Sports, One Sports+, Cignal Play, Cignal Super and Pilipinas Live).
- August 11 – Solar Learning celebrated its 5th anniversary of broadcasting.
- August 13 – Medialink Group Limited launched Ani-One thru Samsung TV Plus as a FAST/linear channel.
- August 16 – Daniel Butas of Brgy. Pasong Kawayan 2, General Trias, Cavite and Verna Joy Tuliao of Brgy. BF-International CAA, Las Piñas were proclaimed as grand winners of Breaking Muse and Escort Mo, Show Mo on It's Showtime.
- August 17
  - After almost 31 years, Cartoon Network Philippines ceased on major providers like Cignal, and migrated to the 16:9 widescreen aspect ratio format on its standard-definition feed and returned its Cartoon Network Asia feed.
  - Actor Pepe Herrera (portrayed as "Foxtastic Samurai") proclaimed as the third season grand winner of Masked Singer Pilipinas.
  - The PLDT High Speed Hitters clinched the 2025 Premier Volleyball League on Tour title after defeating the Chery Tiggo Crossovers 3–2 at the SM Mall of Asia Arena in Pasay and also their first title in franchise history. On August 31, the said team also clinched the 2025 Premier Volleyball League Invitational Conference title after defeating the Kobe Shinwa University 3–1 at the Araneta Coliseum in Cubao, Quezon City. This was also their 1st back-to-back championship and first team to become undefeated in 2 conferences.
- August 21 – Pinoy Big Brother celebrated its 20th anniversary on Philippine television.
- August 23 – City Sanctuary Worship Celebration celebrated its 5th anniversary on Philippine television.

=== September ===
- September 1
  - After a year and 8 months, Broadcast Enterprises and Affiliated Media terminated Blast Sports on BEAM TV's digital subchannel line-up via Channel 31 due to the expiration of its licensing agreement with the network, and was replaced by UFC TV. Meanwhile, the channel continued to stream on TAP Digital Media Ventures Corporation's Blast TV.
  - Myx has switched its airing of aspect ratio format quality on the channel feed and its programming to widescreen format (16:9) as being converted its mitigation of reception through digital signal reception through Sky Cable, Cignal and other cable and satellite providers, iWant, TFC IPTV, and other digital platforms after almost 28 years on the usage of broadcast video picture resolution that migrated from fullscreen format (4:3).
- September 5 – News Patrol celebrated its 20th anniversary on Philippine television.
- September 6 – Jean Jordan Abina proclaimed as the ultimate grand winner of The Clones: Ka-Voice of the Stars on Eat Bulaga!.
- September 7
  - Jong Madaliday of Cotabato City won the seventh season of The Clash.
  - PTV News Tonight and Rise and Shine Pilipinas celebrated its 5th anniversary on Philippine television.
- September 11 – Two ABS-CBN/Creative Programs linear channels (Cine Mo! and Knowledge Channel) have switched its airing of aspect ratio format quality on the channel feed and its programming to widescreen format (16:9) as being converted its mitigation of reception through digital signal reception through free TV (for Knowledge Channel), Sky Cable, Cignal and other cable and satellite providers, iWant, TFC IPTV, and other digital platforms after more than 22 years (for Cine Mo!) and after almost 29 years (for Knowledge Channel) on the usage of broadcast video picture resolution that migrated from fullscreen format (4:3).
- September 12–28 – The 2025 FIVB Men's Volleyball World Championship took place at the SM Mall of Asia Arena in Pasay and Smart Araneta Coliseum in Cubao, Quezon City. On April 28, MediaQuest Holdings, through Cignal TV and MVP Group of Companies, and their sister companies PLDT-Smart Communications awarded the rights to the annual games that aired on six free-to-air/cable and satellite/online linear platforms (RPTV, One Sports, One Sports+, Cignal Play, Cignal Super and Pilipinas Live).
- September 19 – Omnicontent Management, Inc. and Plus Media Networks, Pte. Ltd. formally relaunched Aniplus Asia thru Samsung TV Plus as a FAST/linear channel.
- September 20 – INC TV celebrated its 25th anniversary of broadcasting.
- September 28 – Alexa Mendoza of Calamba, Laguna won the first season of Idol Kids Philippines.
- September 30 – In coinciding with its 13th anniversary on October 22, Jeepney TV has switched its airing of aspect ratio format quality on the channel feed and its programming to widescreen format (16:9) as being converted its mitigation of reception through digital signal reception through Sky Cable, Cignal and other cable and satellite providers, iWant, TFC IPTV, and other digital platforms at exactly 9:00 a.m. after almost 13 years on the usage of broadcast video picture resolution that migrated from fullscreen format (4:3).

=== October ===
- October 1 – All pay television operators and providers in the Philippines have added or terminated a number of various channels and networks on their respective listing line-ups.
- October 2 – Saksi celebrated its 30th anniversary of the longest-running late-night newscast on Philippine television since it premiered in 1995.
- October 3
  - Intercontinental Broadcasting Corporation granted an amendment of its congressional franchise after President Bongbong Marcos signed Republic Act No. 12311 (previously Republic Act No. 8954), allowing IBC to operate radio and television stations nationwide.
  - The Christ's Commission Fellowship's Word of God Network celebrated its 10th anniversary of the milestone religious program on Philippine television since it premiered in 2015.
- October 5
  - As part of the year-long 50th anniversary celebration, Philippine Basketball Association opened its 50th season on Philippine television since it established in 1975.
  - Frontline Pilipinas, News5 Alerts and Ted Failon at DJ Chacha sa True FM celebrated its 5th anniversary on Philippine television.
- October 9 – The Walt Disney Company replaced the Star content hub with Hulu on the streaming platform Disney+ in key international markets, including the Philippines.
- October 10 – A2Z celebrated its 5th anniversary of broadcasting.
- October 11 – Masaganang Buhay celebrated its 5th anniversary on Philippine television.
- October 18 – Rodjun Cruz and Dasuri Choi proclaimed as Grand Champion of Stars on the Floor.
- October 20 – Bubble Gang celebrated its 30th anniversary of the longest-running sketch comedy show on Philippine television since it premiered in 1995.
- October 25 – Amazon Prime Video began streaming its own coverage of live NBA games globally, including the Philippines.
- October 21–30 – Cablelink launched three channels on their line-up by respective date: Abante TV and Bilyonaryo News Channel on October 21; and TapSilog on October 30.

=== November ===
- November 1 – Shop TV celebrated its 20th anniversary of broadcasting.
- November 2 – After the success of the return of ABS-CBN-produced programming in the Visayas Region, ABS-CBN Regional stations, via A2Z Regional and ABS-CBN News, revived a regional news service, TV Patrol Regional, as a weekly roundup of the best national and local news stories, with a pilot online-only edition in Cebuano to serve viewers in Central Visayas and in the Cebuano language. This also served as the historic return of regional news programming after almost 5 years and 2 months due to the denial of ABS-CBN broadcast franchise on July 10, 2020, that led to the cessation of ABS-CBN-produced regional broadcasts on August 28, 2020. A television return of the program happened on November 16, more than 5 years after the final regional TV news broadcasts ended on May 4, 2020.
- November 3 – Sky Cable terminated two SPOTV linear channels on their line-up: SPOTV and SPOTV2 due to the expiration of Sky's contracts with the channels. Meanwhile, both channels continued to air via Cablelink, Cignal and other cable and satellite providers and through its own streaming service SPOTV Now.
- November 7 – Count Your Blessings celebrated its 5th anniversary on Philippine television.
- November 8 – Kent Villarba of Dalaguete, Cebu proclaimed as the Tawag ng Tanghalan: Ika-9 na Taon Grand Champion on It's Showtime.
- November 9 – Garrett Bolden, Thea Astley and Arabelle Dela Cruz were proclaimed as winners of Veiled Musician Philippines on All-Out Sundays, granting them the opportunity to represent the Philippines in the South Korean singing competition series Veiled Cup.
- November 11 – Balitanghali celebrated its 20th anniversary on Philippine television.
- November 20
  - Myx, the Philippines' leading music pay TV channel, celebrated its 25th anniversary of broadcasting on cable and satellite television.
  - Disney+ Philippines began streaming its own coverage of select live NBA games.
- November 20–24 – The 2025 Junior World Artistic Gymnastics Championships took place at the Newport World Resorts in Pasay. MediaQuest Holdings, (Cignal TV) and MVP Group of Companies, and their sister companies PLDT-Smart Communications awarded the rights to the annual games that aired on five free-to-air/cable and satellite/online linear platforms (One Sports, One Sports+, Cignal Play, Cignal Super and Pilipinas Live).
- November 21 – December 7 – The 2025 FIFA Futsal Women's World Cup took place at the PhilSports Arena in Pasig. MediaQuest Holdings, (Cignal TV) and MVP Group of Companies, and their sister companies PLDT-Smart Communications awarded the rights to the annual games that aired on six free-to-air/cable and satellite/online linear platforms (RPTV, One Sports, One Sports+, Cignal Play, Cignal Super and Pilipinas Live).
- November 23 – S.O.C.O.: Scene of the Crime Operatives celebrated its 20th anniversary on Philippine television.
- November 29 – The Criss Cross King Crunchers clinched the 2025 Spikers' Turf Invitational Conference title after defeating guest team Kindai University of Japan in five sets (25–15, 25–21, 23–25, 23–25, 22–20).
- November 30 – The Petro Gazz Angels clinched the 2025 Premier Volleyball League Reinforced Conference title after defeating the Zus Coffee Thunderbelles 3–1 at the Araneta Coliseum in Cubao, Quezon City. This is also their 2nd championship title in 1 season.

=== December ===
- December 1–5 – It's Showtime held a weeklong MagPASKOsikat special during their Laro Laro Pick segment (first premiered on August 18) as part of the show's 16th anniversary, offering a grand prize of ₱1 million. Only two contestants, Disyang (on December 4), and Angela (on December 5), had successfully won the ₱1 million grand prize.
- December 1
  - Kapwa Ko Mahal Ko celebrated its 50th anniversary on Philippine television since it premiered in 1975.
  - Sky Cable terminated five HBO linear channels on their line-up: Cinemax, HBO, HBO Family, HBO Hits and HBO Signature due to the expiration of Sky's contracts with the channels. Meanwhile, the channels continued to air via Cablelink, Cignal, and provincial cable providers via distributor CableBOSS, while select movies and HBO Originals content are still available on its own streaming platform HBO Max. In prior of three replacement linear channels, Blast Movies, Lotus TV Macau and Studio Universal were launched on their line-up.
- December 2 – MediaQuest Holdings, through Cignal TV and MVP Group of Companies, and their sister companies PLDT-Smart Communications extended their multi-year deal with the National Basketball Association (NBA) to aired games on six free-to-air/cable and satellite/online linear platforms (RPTV, One Sports, NBA TV Philippines, Cignal Play, Cignal Super and Pilipinas Live), following the start of the 2025–26 season on October 22.
- December 4
  - After 4 years and almost 11 months, Lopez Holdings Corporation (ABS-CBN Corporation) and PLDT's Beneficial Trust Fund (MediaQuest Holdings through Cignal TV and TV5 Network, Inc.) announced a termination of its content partnership deal for airing ABS-CBN-produced programs on TV5 after January 1, 2026 due to financial disputes involving blocktime fees which was subsequently settled. On December 17, ABS-CBN Corporation and Advanced Media Broadcasting System entered a licensing agreement to air the Kapamilya Channel on All TV effective January 2, 2026, replacing Jeepney TV.
  - Bjorn Morta proclaimed as the Tanghalan ng Kampeon Season 3 Grand Champion on TiktoClock.
- December 8 – Selected Knowledge Channel programs began its simultaneous broadcast on Solar Learning that stemmed from a three-party memorandum of agreement among Solar Entertainment Corporation (via its subsidiary Solar Pictures Inc.), the Knowledge Channel Foundation Inc., and the Department of Education (DepEd), aiming to revive DepEd TV after more than 3 years and help reduce learning loss while strengthening the resilience of education during disruptions.
- December 9–20 – The 2025 SEA Games took place in Thailand. MediaQuest Holdings, (through Cignal TV and TV5 Network, Inc.) and MVP Group of Companies, and their sister companies, PLDT-Smart Communications, awarded the rights to the annual games that air on eight free-to-air/cable and satellite/online linear platforms (TV5, One News, One Sports, One Sports+, RPTV, Cignal Play, Cignal Super and Pilipinas Live).
- December 13 – The San Beda Red Lions clinched the NCAA Season 101 basketball tournaments after defeating the Letran Knights 2–0 in a best-of-three game series at the Araneta Coliseum in Quezon City.
- December 14
  - Sofia Mallares of Pasig City (coached by Zack Tabudlo) proclaimed as the seventh season grand champion of The Voice Kids.
  - The UST Growling Tigresses win the UAAP Season 88 women's basketball title after defeating the NU Lady Bulldogs 2–1 in a do-or-die three-game series at the SM Mall of Asia Arena in Pasay.
- December 16 – The Abra Weavers clinched the 2025 MPBL season title after defeating the Quezon Huskers 3–0 in a best-of-five game series. The team has the most win-loss record in a single season of the MPBL with 38–1.
- December 17 – The De La Salle Green Archers clinched the UAAP Season 88 men's basketball title after defeating the UP Fighting Maroons 2–1 in a do-or-die three-game series at the Araneta Coliseum in Quezon City.
- December 29 – In coinciding with the 65th anniversary on June 19, TV5 Network relaunched Kapatid Channel as a cable and satellite-only channel, exclusively on Cignal TV and Cignal Play.
- December 31 – Two MTV linear channels in the Philippines (MTV 90s and MTV Live) have ceased their broadcast worldwide by Paramount International Networks due to the company's restructuring policy.

== Debuts ==
=== Major networks ===
==== A2Z ====
The following are programs that debuted on A2Z:

- January 18: Time to Dance
- January 20: Incognito
- January 25: Bisaya Ni (A2Z Visayas and Mindanao)
- January 27: How to Spot a Red Flag
- February 22: Dear MOR (A2Z Visayas and Mindanao)
- March 3: Saving Grace: The Untold Story
- March 10: Liar
- March 29: Pilipinas Got Talent (season 7)
- April 21: Happiness
- April 26: Maalaala Mo Kaya (2nd incarnation; season 31)
- June 16: Unchained Love
- June 23: Sins of the Father
- June 28: Idol Kids Philippines and Rainbow Rumble (season 2)
- July 21: It's Okay to Not Be Okay (Philippine adaptation)
- August 2: Maalaala Mo Kaya: Hugot from the Vault
- October 4: Your Face Sounds Familiar (season 4)
- October 6: Go Ahead
- October 20: What Lies Beneath
- November 16: TV Patrol Regional
- November 24: Roja

===== Re-runs =====
- January 6: Viral Scandal
- January 13: Huwag Kang Mangamba
- March 10: Meteor Garden (2001)^{1}^{2}^{3}^{4}^{5}
- May 13: Meteor Garden II^{1}^{2}^{3}^{4}^{5}
- July 7: Pamilya Sagrado
- August 4: Linlang: The Teleserye Version
- December 1: Lavender Fields
- December 8: Senior High

Notes
^ ^{a} Originally aired on ABS-CBN (now Kapamilya Channel)
^ ^{b} Originally aired on GMA
^ ^{c} Originally aired on Jeepney TV
^ ^{d} Originally aired on Q (now GTV)
^ ^{e} Originally aired on Asianovela Channel (now defunct)
^ ^{f} Originally aired on Kapamilya Channel

==== All TV ====
The following are programs that debuted on All TV:

- February 6: All TV News: Mabilis Lang 'To
- April 26: Maalaala Mo Kaya (2nd incarnation; season 31)
- June 28: Rainbow Rumble (season 2) and Sparks Camp (seasons 1 and 2)
- June 29: Rated Korina
- August 2: Maalaala Mo Kaya: Hugot from the Vault
- September 14: Basta Enerhiya, Sagot Kita! (season 2)

==== Re-runs ====
- January 6: Basta't Kasama Kita^{1}
- January 13: If You Wish Upon Me
- January 20: Ina, Kapatid, Anak^{1}
- February 3: Dolce Amore^{1}^{5}^{6} and From Now On, Showtime!
- February 10: A Beautiful Affair^{1}
- February 15: Good Vibes^{1}
- March 3: Starla^{1}
- March 8: Ang Munting Paraiso^{1}
- March 10: Why Her?
- March 17: Bagito^{1}
- March 24: Sarah the Teen Princess^{1}
- March 29: Halik^{1}
- March 31: Calla Lily^{1}
- April 14: River Where the Moon Rises
- April 21: Hawak Kamay^{1}
- May 5: Maging Sino Ka Man (2006)^{1}
- May 12: Angelito: Batang Ama^{1}
- May 26: My Dear Heart^{1}
- May 31: Mangarap Ka^{1}
- June 23: Honesto^{1}
- June 30: Galema: Anak ni Zuma^{1}
- July 12: Super Inggo^{1}^{3}
- July 21: Ningning and Pusong Ligaw^{1}
- July 29: The Greatest Love^{1}
- August 4: Noah^{1}
- August 11: Ang sa Iyo ay Akin^{2}^{4}^{5}^{6} and The Legal Wife^{1}
- August 30: Hiwaga ng Kambat^{1}
- September 1: My Super D^{1}
- September 13: What's Wrong with Secretary Kim (Philippine adaptation)^{2}^{5}^{6}
- September 20: Ysabella^{1}
- September 29: Walang Hanggan (2012)^{1}
- October 13: Kokey at Ako^{1}^{5}
- October 20: Annaliza (2013)^{1}
- November 8: Flower of Evil^{4}^{5}^{6}
- November 17: Hiram na Mukha, Little Champ and Maria Flordeluna^{1}
- November 24: Precious Hearts Romances Presents: Paraiso^{1}
- December 8: Apoy sa Dagat^{1}
- December 13: Kampanerang Kuba^{1}
- December 22: Ikaw ay Pag-Ibig, Maging Sino Ka Man: Ang Pagbabalik and The Blood Sisters^{1}

Notes

1. ^ ^{a} Originally aired on ABS-CBN (now Kapamilya Channel)
2. ^ ^{b} Originally aired on TV5
3. ^ ^{c} Originally aired on Yey!
4. ^ ^{d} Originally aired on Jeepney TV
5. ^ ^{e} Originally aired on Kapamilya Channel
6. ^ ^{f} Originally aired on A2Z

==== GMA ====
The following are programs that debuted on GMA Network:

- January 1: Kamen Rider Saber
- January 6: Mga Batang Riles
- January 13: Agency, My Ilonggo Girl and Prinsesa ng City Jail
- January 20: Lolong: Bayani ng Bayan and Perfect Marriage Revenge
- January 27: Yo-kai Watch!
- February 1: Maka (season 2)
- February 3: Wicked-in-Law
- February 9: Pinas Sarap
- February 10: Binibining Marikit
- February 24: Mommy Dearest
- March 2: FPJ sa GMA (2nd incarnation)
- March 8: Where in Manila
- March 9: Pinoy Big Brother: Celebrity Collab Edition
- March 10: The Bureau of Magical Things (season 2)
- March 17: Red Balloon
- March 23: The Little Prince and Friends
- March 24: Slay
- March 31: The Legend of Shen Li
- April 5: Angry Birds: Bubble Trouble and Makerspace
- April 6: Bakugan 3.1
- April 21: Oh My Boss and The Cheery Lee, Village Headman
- May 14: Dr. Stone (season 1)
- June 7: Maka (season 3)
- June 8: The Clash (season 7)
- June 16: Bossam: Steal the Fate and Encantadia Chronicles: Sang'gre
- June 23: My Father's Wife, Sanggang-Dikit FR and The Lovely Runner
- June 28: Magic Kaito 1412 and Stars on the Floor (season 1)
- June 30: Akusada and Kamen Rider Revice
- July 6: H2O: Mermaid Adventures
- July 7: Beauty Empire and Hidden Love (Chinese adaptation)
- July 14: Desirable Flowers
- July 21: Cruz vs Cruz and One Piece (season 17)
- August 25: One Ordinary Day
- August 30: Taffy
- September 6: Maka Lovestream
- September 8: Love Between Fairy and Moon Supreme and When I Marry a Stranger
- September 14: The Voice Kids (season 7)
- October 13: Hating Kapatid
- October 20: You Are My Makeup Artist
- October 25: Pinoy Big Brother: Celebrity Collab Edition 2.0
- November 8: Angry Birds: Slingshot Stories Maker Space
- December 29: Tricky Love

===== Re-runs =====
- January 20: Just for Laughs Gags^{3}^{4}^{5}
- February 8: Sparkle U
- February 22: Voltes V (2017 reboot dub)
- March 29: Magic Kaito
- May 4: Detective Conan (season 7) and Power Rangers Beast Morphers
- June 2: A.D. The Bible Continues^{1}
- September 8: Wicked-in-Law
- September 29: The Baker King
- October 4: GameKeepers
- October 12: A.D. The Bible Continues^{1}
- November 3: To the Moon and Back and Unica Hija
- December 20: Sparkle U: #Frenemies

Notes
^ ^{a} Originally aired on ABS-CBN (now Kapamilya Channel)
^ ^{b} Originally aired on GMA News TV (now GTV)
^ ^{c} Originally aired on Jack TV (now defunct)
^ ^{d} Originally aired on Q (now GTV)
^ ^{e} Originally aired on RPN (now RPTV)
^ ^{f} Originally aired on GTV

==== TV5 ====
The following are programs that debuted on TV5:

- January 12: America's Got Talent: Fantasy Team
- January 20: Incognito
- January 27: How to Spot a Red Flag
- February 8: Be The Next: 9 Dreamers
- March 1: Sing Galing! (2nd incarnation; season 3)
- March 3: Saving Grace: The Untold Story
- March 10: Liar
- March 23: Aplikante
- March 29: Pilipinas Got Talent (season 7)
- March 30: Balwarte
- April 6: American Idol (season 23)
- April 21: Happiness
- May 5: Totoy Bato (2025)
- May 11: The Men's Room
- May 17: Emojination (season 5) and Masked Singer Pilipinas (season 3)
- May 19: Ang Mutya ng Section E (season 1) and Una sa Lahat
- June 2: Secret Royal Inspector & Joy
- June 16: Unchained Love
- June 23: Sins of the Father
- June 28: Idol Kids Philippines
- June 30: Frontline Express AM
- July 14: Cine Cinco sa Hapon
- July 21: It's Okay to Not Be Okay (Philippine adaptation) and Seducing Drake Palma
- August 10: Vibe
- August 11: Vibe Nights and Vibe Up
- August 16: Vibe TV
- August 17: Oras ng Katotohanan
- September 13: Para sa Isa't Isa
- September 27: Sing Galing: Sing-lebrity Edition (season 2)
- October 4: Your Face Sounds Familiar (season 4)
- October 6: Go Ahead
- October 11: Love on the Clock
- October 18: Bad Genius: The Series (Philippine adaptation)
- October 20: What Lies Beneath
- November 23: Presinto 5 (second incarnation)
- November 24: Roja
- December 29: Kiddie Explorers

===== Re-runs =====
- January 20: Marimar (1994)^{2}^{3}^{4}^{5}^{7}
- March 1: Wow Mali: Doble Tawa
- March 10: Glamorosa
- March 24: Mr. Queen^{2}^{6}
- April 21: Betty sa NY^{5} and The Adventures of Puss in Boots
- April 28: Sa Ngalan ng Ina
- May 5: Rosalinda (1999)^{1}^{2}^{3}
- May 26: Babaeng Hampaslupa
- June 28: Gretchen Ho Reports^{8}^{9}
- June 30: Trolls: The Beat Goes On!
- July 5: Dragons: Race to the Edge
- July 26: Gus Abelgas Forensics (seasons 3-5)^{9}
- October 13: Dog of Flanders^{1}^{3}^{10}^{11} and Little Princess Sarah^{1}^{10}^{11}
- December 20: Safe Ka Ba, 2025?^{9}
- December 22: The Adventures of Tom Sawyer^{1}^{10}^{11}^{12}

Notes
^ ^{a} Originally aired on ABS-CBN (now Kapamilya Channel)
^ ^{b} Originally aired on GMA
^ ^{c} Originally aired on Q (now GTV)
^ ^{d} Originally aired on RPN (now RPTV)
^ ^{e} Originally aired on One Screen (now defunct)
^ ^{f} Originally aired on Heart of Asia Channel
^ ^{g} Originally aired on Solar Flix
^ ^{h} Originally aired on One News
^ ^{i} Originally aired on One PH
^ ^{j} Originally aired on Yey!
^ ^{k} Originally aired on A2Z
^ ^{l} Originally aired on Kapamilya Channel

=== State-owned networks ===
==== PTV ====
The following are programs that debuted on People's Television Network:

- January 11: Sagisag Kultura TV
- February 3: ABU Sports
- February 10: Radyo Publiko Serbisyo
- March 1: COMELEC: Usapang Halalan
- March 3: Pag-usapan Natin
- April 23: Code Red
- April 27: Kundiman ATBP
- April 28: Know Your Candidates
- June 14: Maaram
- August 10: ASEAN Para Sa’yo
- August 16: Patubig sa Bagong Pilipinas
- September 29: Kangrunaan a Damag and PTV News Mindanao
- October 4: Pit Stop Pinas and Straight Shot
- October 25: Philippine Bay Watch

==== IBC ====
The following are programs that debuted on IBC:

- January 11: Cooltura (season 2)
- January 20: Congress News
- March 9: Legally Speaking (season 1)
- March 10: Kandidato
- March 24: Mindanow Network Hour
- March 29: Dok True Ba? (season 3)
- April 5: Kalye Sining
- April 27: Sayanista
- August 10: ASEAN Para Sa’yo
- September 15: Ala-Una Sa Balita
- October 26: Legally Speaking (season 2)
- November 7: ResTOURant (season 4)
- December 6: Balitaktakan: Tinig ng Kinabukasan (season 1)
- December 13: House at Your Service
- December 15: 13 News

=== Minor networks ===
The following are programs that debuted on minor networks:

- January 4: Work Related on Aliw 23
- February 17: INC Giving Show and Rising With the Wind on Net 25
- February 18: Lingap Stories on Net 25
- March 10: A Date with the Future on Net 25
- March 16: Senior Moments on Aliw 23
- March 22: 25 Tanong ng Bayan on Net 25
- March 23: Newscoop Weekend on Aliw 23
- April 7: In Good Shape and Tomorrow Today on Net 25
- April 9: Global Us and Rev on Net 25
- April 20: Fact or Fake on Aliw 23
- April 28: As Beautiful as You on Net 25
- April 30: The Way Forward on Aliw 23
- May 5: Balitang A2Z and Japan Video Topics on Light TV
- June 9: Go Go Squid! on Net 25
- June 16: Best Choice Ever on Net 25
- July 14: Kimchi Family on Net 25
- July 24: Zoom In on Aliw 23
- August 6: Jesus Is Lord Prayer Revival Meeting on Light TV
- September 7: Pareng Pares on Aliw 23
- September 8: Syndrome on Net 25
- October 6: Love in Her Bag on Net 25
- October 20: Happy Ending on Net 25
- December 1: Showbiz na Showbiz (2nd incarceration) on Aliw 23
- December 15: Here We Meet Again on Net 25

==== Re-runs ====
- February 15: AveNEU and Musikover on Net 25^{1}
- March 10: Hello, My Shining Love on Net 25
- April 5: Homework and Word Hub on Net 25
- May 19: Pisobilities on Light TV^{2}
- May 20: I Love Pinas and This Is My Story, This Is My Song on Light TV^{2}
- May 21: JAM on Light TV^{2}
- May 22: Kids HQ Sarap Pinoy The Awesome Life and The Healthy Life on Light TV^{2}
- May 23: Hashtag Pinoy and Tiny Kitchen on Light TV^{2}
- May 24: Bless Pilipinas and Organique TV^{2} on Light TV
- May 25: Solemn Sessions on Light TV
- June 28: Landmarks on Net 25
- November 17: Love Me, Love My Voice on Net 25

Notes

1. ^ ^{a} Originally aired on INC TV
2. ^ ^{b} Originally aired on GMA News TV (now GTV)

=== Other channels ===
The following are programs that debuted on other channels:

- January 4: Noontime Movie Hits on GTV
- January 4: Work Related on DWIZ News TV
- January 6: Iskovery Night on D8TV
- January 6: Mga Batang Riles on GTV
- January 6: Arangkada Balita on PRTV Prime Media
- January 6: Boses and Radyo Publiko Serbisyo on Radyo Pilipinas 1 Television
- January 7: Juan Trabaho on Radyo Pilipinas 1 Television
- January 8: DOTR Sakay NA on Radyo Pilipinas 1 Television
- January 9: Tahanan ng OFW on Radyo Pilipinas 1 Television
- January,10: DOLE At Your Service sa Bagong Pilipinas on Radyo Pilipinas 1 Television
- January 11: Media Ngayon on Radyo Pilipinas 1 Television
- January 13: Nagmamahal, Tita Chupeta on DWAN TV
- January 13: My Ilonggo Girl on GTV
- January 18: Time to Dance on Kapamilya Channel and Myx
- January 20: Business 360 and Newsfeed Business on Bilyonaryo News Channel
- January 20: Congress News on Congress TV
- January 20: Isang Tawag Ka Lang on DWAN TV
- January 20: Lolong: Bayani ng Bayan on GTV
- January 20: Incognito on Jeepney TV and Kapamilya Channel
- January 27: How to Spot a Red Flag on Jeepney TV and Kapamilya Channel
- February 1: Spotlight With Sister L on DZRH TV
- February 1: Kapatid Mo, Idol Raffy Tulfo on RPTV
- February 2: Top 5: Mga Kwentong Marc Logan on RPTV
- February 3: Voice of America on D8TV
- February 3: Wil To Win on RPTV
- February 10: Trade Talks on Bilyonaryo News Channel
- February 10: Money Talks with Cathy Yang, Morning Matters and News & Views on One News
- February 15: Love on Top on Bilyonaryo News Channel
- February 15: Hanap Buhay Diaries on DZRH TV
- February 15: Science Pinas on GTV
- February 16: Stars Under Pressure on One PH
- February 17: Starting Lineup on One News
- February 23: Sine Saya on BuKo Channel
- February 23: Filipino at Heart on GTV
- March 1: Sing Galing! (2nd incarnation; season 3) on BuKo Channel and Sari-Sari Channel
- March 1: Prangkahan Na on Radyo Pilipinas 1 Television
- March 1: Homegrowth: The Untold Stories of Sports and Tourism on One News
- March 3: Business Brief on Bilyonaryo News Channel
- March 3: Saving Grace: The Untold Story on Jeepney TV and Kapamilya Channel
- March 3: Aplikante on One News, One PH and RPTV
- March 9: Good Old Days on GTV
- March 10: Kandidato on Congress TV
- March 10: Liar on Kapamilya Channel
- March 15: Kasangga Mo ang Langit on Bilyonaryo News Channel
- March 16: Senior Moments on DWIZ News TV
- March 17: Pay it Forward with Maricar Bautista on Bilyonaryo News Channel
- March 17: This is Our Team on RPTV
- March 22: Gus Abelgas Forensics (seasons 4 and 5) on One PH
- March 23: Newscoop Weekend on DWIZ News TV
- March 24: Slay on GTV
- March 29: Pilipinas Got Talent (season 7) on Kapamilya Channel
- March 29: Balwarte on One PH, RPTV and True TV
- March 29: Kwatro Kantos, Raz-tsada and Serbisyong DSWD for Every Juan on PRTV Prime Media and TeleRadyo Serbisyo
- March 30: Balwarte on One News
- April 3: Abogado on Bilyonaryo News Channel
- April 14: D8TV News: Balitang Balita on D8TV
- April 14: The Situation Report on DZRH TV
- April 20: Fact or Fake on DWIZ News TV
- April 21: Happiness on Kapamilya Channel
- April 26: Maalaala Mo Kaya (2nd incarnation; season 31) on Kapamilya Channel
- April 26: Kwatro Alas on PRTV Prime Media and TeleRadyo Serbisyo
- April 27: Politiko Talks on Bilyonaryo News Channel
- April 30: The A-List on ANC
- April 30: The Way Forward on RPTV
- May 5: Totoy Bato (2025) on Sari-Sari Channel
- May 16: FPJ sa G! Flicks on GTV
- May 17: Emojination (season 5) on BuKo Channel
- May 17: Masked Singer Pilipinas (season 3) on Sari-Sari Channel
- May 19: Una sa Lahat on One PH, RPTV and True TV
- May 19: Recipe of Love (ETCerye) on SolarFlix
- May 23: The B Side (season 2) on Cinema One
- May 24: Dokyu-Mento on Knowledge Channel
- May 29: DZMM Special Coverage (2nd incarnation) and Love Konek on DZMM TeleRadyo
- May 29: DZMM Special Coverage (2nd incarnation) on PRTV Prime Media
- May 30: Ako 'To Si Tyang Amy, ATM: Ano'ng Take Mo?, Balitapatan, DZMM Balita Ngayon (2nd incarnation), Gising Pilipinas, Headline Ngayon, Headline sa Hapon, Isyu Spotted, Kabayan, Nagseserbisyo Niña Corpuz, Panalangin sa Alas-Tres ng Hapon, Remember Your Music and TV Patrol on DZMM TeleRadyo
- May 30: DZMM Balita Ngayon (2nd incarnation) on PRTV Prime Media
- May 31: Bilyonaryo Quiz B (season 1) on Bilyonaryo News Channel
- May 31: Anong Ganap?, Balita Antemano, Feel Kita, Headline Ngayon Weekend, Iwas Sakit, Iwas Gastos, K-Paps Playlist, Kwatro Alas, Ligtas Dapat, Pasado Serbisyo, Safe Space, Serbisyong DSWD for Every Juan, Spot Report, TV Patrol Weekend, Win Today and Yan Tayo on DZMM TeleRadyo
- June 1: Aprub 'Yan!, Bongga Ka Jhai!, GBU: God Bless U, Konek Ka D'yan, Panalong Diskarte, Private Talks, Rosary Hour, Story Outlook, Sunny Side Up, Travel ni Ahwel and Wow Sikat on DZMM TeleRadyo
- June 1: BTS: Bring the Soul Docu-Series on GTV
- June 2: Aksyon Ngayon, Alam Na Dis!, Maalaala Mo Kaya sa DZMM (2nd incarnation), Radyo Patrol Balita Alas-Kwatro (2nd incarnation), Radyo Patrol Balita Alas-Siyete (2nd incarnation), Ronda Pasada and Tandem ng Bayan on DZMM TeleRadyo
- June 2: Aksyon Ngayon, Alam Na Dis!, Maalaala Mo Kaya sa DZMM (2nd incarnation), Radyo Patrol Balita Alas-Siyete (2nd incarnation) and Tandem ng Bayan on PRTV Prime Media
- June 7: Radyo Patrol Balita Alas-Siyete Weekend (2nd incarnation) on DZMM TeleRadyo and PRTV Prime Media
- June 7: Expertalk (season 5) on GTV
- June 8: I Heart PH (season 10) on GTV
- June 15: Point of View on DZRH TV
- June 16: Encantadia Chronicles: Sang'gre on GTV
- June 16: Unchained Love on Kapamilya Channel
- June 23: D8TV News Alert on D8TV
- June 23: Sanggang Dikit FR on GTV
- June 23: Sins of the Father on Jeepney TV and Kapamilya Channel
- June 28: Idol Kids Philippines and Rainbow Rumble (season 2) on Kapamilya Channel
- June 29: Chinese by Blood, Global by Heart on Bilyonaryo News Channel
- June 29: BTS: Break the Silence on GTV
- July 7: Beauty Empire on GTV
- July 14: Beautiful Day on Bilyonaryo News Channel
- July 21: It's Okay to Not Be Okay (Philippine adaptation) on Jeepney TV and Kapamilya Channel
- July 26: Zoom In on RPTV
- August 2: PinaSigla! on DZMM TeleRadyo and PRTV Prime Media
- August 2: Healing Galing with Doc E on GTV
- August 2: Maalaala Mo Kaya: Hugot from the Vault on Kapamilya Channel
- August 3: The Chosen (season 1) on GTV
- August 4: PBBM Podcast on D8TV
- August 4: Word of God on One PH
- August 8: Sessions with Brian Yamsuan on Bilyonaryo News Channel
- August 9: Hukbong Dagat ng Pilipinas and The AI Talks with The Voice Master on Radyo Pilipinas 1 Television
- August 9: Cine Cinco Weekend Saya on RPTV
- August 10: Congress TV, RTVMalacañang and Senate Hearing on D8TV
- August 10: Vibe on BuKo Channel, Sari-Sari Channel and True TV
- August 11: The Daily Dish on Bilyonaryo News Channel
- August 11: Vibe Nights and Vibe Up on BuKo Channel and True TV
- August 11: Vibe Nights on One PH
- August 16: Vibe TV on BuKo Channel and Sari-Sari Channel
- August 16: Basta Batas and Money Masters on One PH
- August 16: Basta Batas, Money Masters and Vibe TV on True TV
- August 30: Aksyon DOLE sa DZMM on DZMM TeleRadyo and PRTV Prime Media
- September 1: Kwento Nights on DZMM TeleRadyo
- September 1: Myx Now on Myx
- September 7: Pareng Pares on DWIZ News TV
- September 13: Divina Law on Bilyonaryo News Channel
- September 13: Para sa Isa't Isa on Sari-Sari Channel
- September 15: Ala-Una Sa Balita on Congress TV
- September 15: PRTV News Break on PRTV Prime Media
- September 20: Siyensikat (season 6) on GTV
- September 21: Word of God on GTV
- September 22: Politiko Nightly on Bilyonaryo News Channel
- September 23: Rampa on Bilyonaryo News Channel
- September 26: The PH Insider on D8TV
- September 27: Unscripted on Bilyonaryo News Channel
- September 27: Sing Galing: Sing-lebrity Edition (season 2) on BuKo Channel and Sari-Sari Channel
- October 4: Your Face Sounds Familiar (season 4) on Kapamilya Channel
- October 6: Go Ahead on Kapamilya Channel
- October 6: Gen H: Generation Healthy on Knowledge Channel
- October 6: Totoy Bato (2025) on One PH
- October 6: Cine Cinco sa Hapon on RPTV
- October 11: Cine Cinco Hit na Hit and Think About It on RPTV
- October 12: Cine Cinco Astig Sunday on RPTV
- October 19: With Due Respect on PRTV Prime Media
- October 20: Barangay 13 on DWAN TV
- October 20: What Lies Beneath on Jeepney TV and Kapamilya Channel
- October 25: Business Matters (season 12) on GTV
- October 27: The Spokes on Bilyonaryo News Channel
- October 29: Beyond The Game on Bilyonaryo News Channel
- November 3: Balitang Konektado on DWAN TV
- November 10: Ala-Una Sa Balita, D’Showbiz Authority and Woke Up Like This! on DWAN TV
- November 16: TV Patrol Regional on Kapamilya Channel
- November 18: Tech Bytes on Bilyonaryo News Channel
- November 21: Taym In! on Cine Mo!
- November 23: Presinto 5 (second incarnation) on One PH
- November 24: Roja on Jeepney TV and Kapamilya Channel
- November 26: Pinoy Flavors on DWAN TV
- December 1: Biyaheng IZ and Showbiz na Showbiz (2nd incarnation) on DWIZ News TV
- December 4: O.F.W. (Overseas Filipino Watch) on DWAN TV
- December 5: Session Unplugged on DWAN TV
- December 6: Balitaktakan: Tinig ng Kinabukasan (season 1) on Congress TV
- December 13: House at Your Service on Congress TV
- December 20: Safe Ka Ba, 2025? on One PH
- December 21: Presinto 5 (2nd incarnation) on RPTV
- December 29: Eat Bulaga!, Frontline Express, Frontline Pilipinas, Frontline Tonight, Gud Morning Kapatid, Inay Ko Po!, Sa Totoo Lang, Totoy Bato (2025) and Una sa Lahat on Kapatid Channel
- December 30: Play by Play on Kapatid Channel

==== Re-runs ====
- January 1: MedTalk Health Talk on RPTV^{24}
- January 6: Another Miss Oh on Heart of Asia^{2}
- January 6: Basta't Kasama Kita and May Isang Pangarap on Jeepney TV^{1}
- January 6: Viral Scandal on Kapamilya Channel
- January 13: When Duty Calls on Heart of Asia^{26}
- January 13: We Will Survive on Jeepney TV^{1}
- January 13: Huwag Kang Mangamba on Kapamilya Channel
- January 19: Spy × Family on GTV^{2}
- January 20: Ina, Kapatid, Anak on Jeepney TV^{1}
- January 27: Palos on Cine Mo!^{1}
- January 27: Tomorrow's Cantabile on GTV
- January 27: What's Wrong with Secretary Kim on Heart of Asia^{1}^{2}^{21}
- January 27: Ligaw na Bulaklak on Jeepney TV^{1}
- February 1: Budol Alert and No Harm, No Foul on RPTV^{3}
- February 2: Barangay Singko Panalo, Emojination (season 1) and John en Ellen on RPTV^{3}
- February 3: Niña Niño on BuKo Channel^{3}
- February 3: My Love from the Star on GTV^{2}^{33}
- February 3: Jumong^{2}^{16}^{26} and Show Window: The Queen's House^{2} on Heart of Asia
- February 3: Dolce Amore on Jeepney TV^{1}
- February 3: Batas et Al (2023 original version)^{24}, Suntok sa Buwan^{3} and Tropa Mo Ko Unli^{3} on RPTV
- February 8: John en Ellen on BuKo Channel^{3}
- February 8: Art of the Spirit and From the Heart Specials: Ending Like a Flower on Heart of Asia
- February 9: Tokyo Revengers on GTV^{2}
- February 10: Love Revolution^{2} and The Penthouse (season 1)^{2}^{26} on Heart of Asia
- February 10: A Beautiful Affair on Jeepney TV^{1}
- February 15: Ultraman Z on Heart of Asia^{2}^{26}
- February 15: Good Vibes on Jeepney TV^{1}
- February 17: Goblin on Heart of Asia^{1}^{2}^{21}^{26}
- February 22: Tabing Ilog on Jeepney TV^{1}
- February 22: Wansapanataym on Kapamilya Channel^{1}^{8}^{25}
- February 24: Are We Alright?^{26} and Playful Kiss^{2}^{26} on Heart of Asia
- March 1: Bleach (season 3) on Heart of Asia^{2}
- March 2: DreamWorks Dragons: Rescue Riders and Pan Tau on GTV^{2}
- March 2: From the Heart Specials: The Best Ending on Heart of Asia
- March 3: Starla on Jeepney TV^{1}
- March 8: Miss the Dragon on Heart of Asia^{2}
- March 8: Ang Munting Paraiso on Jeepney TV^{1}
- March 9: To Me, It's Simply You on Heart of Asia^{2}
- March 10: Now, We Are Breaking Up on Heart of Asia^{2}
- March 10: Kahit Konting Pagtingin on Jeepney TV^{1}
- March 10: Meteor Garden (2001)^{1}^{2}^{8}^{16}^{21} on Kapamilya Channel
- March 15: G-mik! on Jeepney TV^{1}
- March 17: You Are My Heartbeat on GTV^{2}^{33}
- March 17: The Love Trap on Heart of Asia^{26}
- March 17: Bagito on Jeepney TV^{1}
- March 22: From the Heart Specials: Ending Again on Heart of Asia
- March 23: The Endlings on GTV^{2}
- March 23: Yumi's Cells on Heart of Asia^{2}^{26}
- March 24: Eve^{2}^{26} and Kokdu: Season of Deity^{2} on Heart of Asia
- March 24: Sarah the Teen Princess on Jeepney TV^{1}
- March 29: The Leaves on Heart of Asia
- March 29: Halik on Jeepney TV^{1}
- March 31: Apoy sa Langit^{2} and Ghost Doctor^{2}^{33} on GTV
- March 31: Calla Lily on Jeepney TV^{1}
- April 4: Building Bridges on RPTV^{24}
- April 5: Revenge Note on Heart of Asia^{2}
- April 6: Piggy Tales on GTV^{2}
- April 7: Lobo on Cine Mo!^{1}^{8}
- April 7: My Roommate Is a Gumiho and The Deadly Affair on Heart of Asia^{2}
- April 7: And I Love You So and Bukas na Lang Kita Mamahalin on Jeepney TV^{1}
- April 14: Doctor Detective on Heart of Asia^{2}
- April 14: Pieta and Precious Hearts Romances Presents: Ang Lalaking Nagmahal Sa Akin on Jeepney TV^{1}
- April 20: An Oriental Odyssey and The Skywatcher on Heart of Asia^{2}
- April 21: Beauty and the Guy^{2}, Kingmaker: The Change of Destiny^{26} and My Forever Sunshine^{2} on Heart of Asia
- April 21: Hawak Kamay on Jeepney TV^{1}
- April 28: Da Body en da Guard on Cine Mo!^{1}
- April 28: Bai Ling Tan on Heart of Asia^{2}
- May 4: Her Bucket List on Heart of Asia^{2}
- May 5: Maging Sino Ka Man (2006) on Jeepney TV^{1}
- May 12: Room No. 9^{26}, Secret Affair^{2} and The Girl Who Sees Smells^{2} on Heart of Asia
- May 12: Angelito: Batang Ama on Jeepney TV^{1}
- May 13: About Time on GTV^{2}^{33}
- May 13: Meteor Garden II on Kapamilya Channel^{1}^{2}^{8}^{16}^{21}
- May 13: MedTalk Health Talk on RPTV^{24}
- May 17: Just for Laughs Gags on GTV^{2}^{12}^{16}^{17}
- May 17: Kamen Rider Zero-One^{2}^{26} and The Heavenly Idol^{2} on Heart of Asia
- May 18: Daimos on GTV^{1}^{2}^{22}^{27}
- May 19: Tayong Dalawa and Yes, Yes Show! on Cine Mo!^{1}
- May 19: Stealer: The Treasure Keeper on Heart of Asia^{2}
- May 19: Mundo Man ay Magunaw on Jeepney TV^{1}
- May 23: True Horror Stories on GTV^{2}^{7}
- May 25: Puppy in my Pocket: Adventures in Pocketville on GTV^{2}^{33}
- May 25: When the Weather Is Fine on Heart of Asia^{2}
- May 26: Galema: Anak ni Zuma and My Dear Heart on Jeepney TV^{1}
- May 31: Mangarap Ka on Jeepney TV^{1}
- June 1: Aliens Ninano on GTV^{2}
- June 1: Poong, the Joseon Psychiatrist (season 2) on Heart of Asia^{2}
- June 2: I Need of Romance 3^{26} and She and Her Perfect Husband^{2} on Heart of Asia
- June 2: Precious Hearts Romances Presents: Bud Brothers on Jeepney TV^{1}
- June 8: The New Legends of Monkey and Trolls: TrollsTopia on GTV^{2}
- June 9: Luv Is: Caught in His Arms on GTV^{2}
- June 9: Beauty Boy^{26} and Curtain Call^{2} on Heart of Asia
- June 14: Parang Kayo Pero Hindi on Heart of Asia^{26}
- June 16: From Helen's Kitchen on BuKo Channel^{3}^{31}
- June 16: Jirisan, Romantic Deception and Still on GTV^{2}
- June 16: The Betrayal and The Penthouse (season 2) on Heart of Asia^{2}
- June 23: Behind Your Smile^{26} and The Red Sleeve^{2} on Heart of Asia
- June 23: Honesto on Jeepney TV^{1}
- June 29: Nabi, My Stepdarling on Heart of Asia^{26}
- June 29: The Better Half on Jeepney TV^{1}^{34}
- June 30: Game of Outlaws and The Wolf on Heart of Asia^{2}
- July 7: My Dear Donovan on Heart of Asia^{2}
- July 7: Aryana and Kahit Puso'y Masugatan on Jeepney TV^{1}
- July 7: 100 Days to Heaven^{1} and Pamilya Sagrado on Kapamilya Channel
- July 12: Super Inggo on Jeepney TV^{1}^{5}^{19}^{25}
- July 13: Parallel World^{2} and Tomorrow's Cantabile^{26} on Heart of Asia
- July 20: Superhero Academy on GTV^{2}
- July 20: Moon Embracing the Sun on Heart of Asia^{2}^{26}
- July 21: The Last Promise and The Penthouse (season 3) on Heart of Asia^{2}
- July 21: Ningning, Precious Hearts Romances Presents: Pintada and Pusong Ligaw on Jeepney TV^{1}
- July 26: Dino Dan^{2}, Queen of the Ring^{2} and Simba The King Lion^{2}^{26} on Heart of Asia
- July 27: Perfect Marriage Revenge on Heart of Asia^{2}
- July 28: Hogu's Love on GTV^{2}
- July 28: Flames of Vengeance^{2}^{26} and Third Rail^{2} on Heart of Asia
- July 28: The Greatest Love on Jeepney TV^{1}
- August 3: Yashahime on GTV^{2}
- August 4: Luv Is: Love at First Read on GTV^{2}
- August 4: Bride of the Water God on Heart of Asia^{2}
- August 4: Noah on Jeepney TV^{1}
- August 4: Linlang: The Teleserye Version on Kapamilya Channel
- August 8: Doors on GTV
- August 9: The Maid on Heart of Asia^{2}
- August 11: Shooting Stars on Heart of Asia^{2}
- August 11: Ang sa Iyo ay Akin^{3}^{19}^{25}, Reputasyon^{1} and The Legal Wife^{1} on Jeepney TV
- August 17: Kung Fu Panda: The Paws of Destiny on GTV^{2}
- August 17: Dr. Tang on Heart of Asia^{2}
- August 18: Ancient Love Poetry and Put Your Head on My Shoulder on Heart of Asia^{2}
- August 24: The Girl He Never Noticed on Heart of Asia^{2}
- August 25: Love at First Night^{2} and Tokyo Revengers^{2}^{26} on Heart of Asia
- August 30: Hiwaga ng Kambat on Jeepney TV^{1}^{19}
- September 1: Kaya ni Mister, Kaya ni Misis on Cine Mo!^{1}
- September 1: When the Sky Falls on Heart of Asia^{2}
- September 1: My Super D on Jeepney TV^{1}
- September 1: The Story of the Filipino on RPTV^{24}
- September 7: Jirisan^{2}^{26} and One Night Steal^{2} on Heart of Asia
- September 8: The Long Ballad on Heart of Asia^{2}
- September 13: Mint to Be on Heart of Asia
- September 14: Douluo Continent on Heart of Asia^{2}
- September 15: Bad Romeo^{2}^{33} and Princess Hours (2006)^{1}^{2}^{8}^{15}^{33} on GTV
- September 15: Jinxed at First^{2}, Love Revolution^{2} and My Love from the Star^{2}^{26} on Heart of Asia
- September 15: Katorse on Jeepney TV^{1}
- September 20: Ysabella on Jeepney TV^{1}
- September 21: From the Heart Specials: Pumpkin Time on Heart of Asia
- September 22: Hearts on Ice on GTV
- September 22: Agency^{2}, Me Always You^{26} and Red Balloon^{2} on Heart of Asia
- September 22: Rebelde (ETCerye) on SolarFlix^{3}
- September 28: Happy Together on GTV^{2}
- September 28: Bai Ling Tan^{2} and Eve^{2}^{26} on Heart of Asia
- September 29: Yo-kai Watch! on Heart of Asia^{2}
- September 29: Walang Hanggan (2012) on Jeepney TV^{1}
- October 6: Endless Love (2019) on Heart of Asia^{2}
- October 6: Kung Ako'y Iiwan Mo on Jeepney TV^{1}
- October 9: Gus Abelgas Forensics (seasons 1–2) on RPTV^{3}^{36}
- October 12: Jack and Jill sa Diamond Hills on RPTV^{3}
- October 13: Kokey at Ako on Jeepney TV^{1}^{19}
- October 20: My Name is Busaba on Heart of Asia^{2}
- October 20: Annaliza (2013) on Jeepney TV^{1}
- October 25: Meteo Heroes on Heart of Asia^{2}^{26}
- October 26: Dear Uge^{2}, Jujutsu Kaisen (season 1)^{2} and Kamen Rider Zero-One^{2}^{33} on GTV
- October 26: Art of the Spirit on Heart of Asia
- October 27: Rewriting Destiny on Heart of Asia^{2}
- November 1: The Girl Who Sees Smells on Heart of Asia^{2}
- November 3: Miss the Dragon^{2}, Snow Eagle Lord^{2} and Witch's Love on Heart of Asia
- November 10: Secret Affair on Heart of Asia^{2}
- November 10: Doctor Next Door on RPTV^{36}
- November 16: The Bureau of Magical Things (season 2) on GTV^{2}
- November 17: Lobo on Cine Mo!^{1}^{8}
- November 17: The Skywatcher on GTV^{2}^{33}
- November 17: Kokdu: Season of Deity and The Legend of Shen Li on Heart of Asia^{2}
- November 17: Dahil May Isang Ikaw, Hiram na Mukha, Little Champ, Maria Flordeluna and Rosalka on Jeepney TV^{1}
- November 17: One Small Act on RPTV^{24}
- November 22: Doctor Detective and Kiss Goblin on Heart of Asia^{2}
- November 23: Poong, the Joseon Psychiatrist (season 1) on Heart of Asia^{2}
- November 24: Blacklist on Heart of Asia^{26}
- November 24: Precious Hearts Romances Presents: Paraiso and The Promise of Forever on Jeepney TV^{1}
- December 1: Hello from the Other Side^{26} and Knockout^{2}^{26}^{29} on Heart of Asia
- December 1: Lavender Fields on Kapamilya Channel
- December 7: I Need of Romance 3 on Heart of Asia^{2}
- December 8: 46 Days on Heart of Asia^{2}
- December 8: Apoy sa Dagat on Jeepney TV^{1}
- December 8: Senior High on Kapamilya Channel
- December 13: Good Old Days on Heart of Asia^{26}
- December 13: Kampanerang Kuba on Jeepney TV^{1}
- December 14: Kiddie Cuisine on BuKo Channel^{31}
- December 15: Bride of the Water God on Heart of Asia^{2}
- December 21: From the Heart Specials: Ending Like a Flower on Heart of Asia
- December 21: Bagani on Jeepney TV^{1}
- December 22: Heartful Café and One the Woman on GTV^{2}^{33}
- December 22: Bad Romeo^{2}^{26} and She and Her Perfect Husband^{2} on Heart of Asia
- December 22: Ikaw ay Pag-Ibig, Maging Sino Ka Man: Ang Pagbabalik and The Blood Sisters on Jeepney TV^{1}
- December 28: The Last Promise on Heart of Asia^{2}
- December 29: Bossam: Steal the Fate and Eclipse of the Heart on Heart of Asia^{2}
- December 29: 40 is the New 30^{31}, Chika, Besh!^{3}^{31}, Kusina ni Mamang^{3}^{37}, Minsan pa Nating Hagkan ang Nakaraan (2023)^{3}^{9}, Mombiz^{31}^{36}, Niña Niño^{3}^{31}, Paano ang Pasko?^{3}^{31}, Padyak Princess^{3}^{37} and Usapang Real Life^{3}^{31} on Kapatid Channel
- December 29: Moon of Desire on Jeepney TV^{1}
- December 30: From Helen's Kitchen on Kapatid Channel^{3}^{31}^{36}^{37}

Notes

1. ^ ^{a} Originally aired on ABS-CBN (now Kapamilya Channel)
2. ^ ^{b} Originally aired on GMA
3. ^ ^{c} Originally aired on TV5
4. ^ ^{d} Originally aired on Cine Mo!
5. ^ ^{e} Originally aired on Yey! (now defunct)
6. ^ ^{f} Originally aired on S+A (now Aliw 23)
7. ^ ^{g} Originally aired on GMA News TV (now GTV)
8. ^ ^{h} Originally aired on Jeepney TV
9. ^ ^{i} Originally aired on Sari-Sari Channel
10. ^ ^{j} Originally aired on Hero (now defunct)
11. ^ ^{k} Originally aired on ETC (now Solar Flix)
12. ^ ^{l} Originally aired on Jack TV (now defunct)
13. ^ ^{m} Originally aired on 2nd Avenue (now defunct)
14. ^ ^{n} Originally aired on CT (now defunct)
15. ^ ^{o} Originally aired on Studio 23 (now Aliw 23)
16. ^ ^{p} Originally aired on Q (now GTV)
17. ^ ^{q} Originally aired on RPN (now RPTV)
18. ^ ^{r} Originally aired on Fox Filipino
19. ^ ^{s} Originally aired on Kapamilya Channel
20. ^ ^{t} Originally aired on Metro Channel
21. ^ ^{u} Originally aired on Asianovela Channel (now defunct)
22. ^ ^{v} Originally aired on PTV
23. ^ ^{w} Originally aired on Knowledge Channel
24. ^ ^{x} Originally aired on CNN Philippines (now RPTV)
25. ^ ^{y} Originally aired on A2Z
26. ^ ^{z} Originally aired on GTV
27. ^ ^{aa} Originally aired on IBC
28. ^ ^{ab} Originally aired on ABC (now TV5)
29. ^ ^{ac} Originally aired on TeleAsia Channel (now defunct)
30. ^ ^{ad} Originally aired on One Screen (now defunct)
31. ^ ^{ae} Originally aired on Colours (now defunct)
32. ^ ^{af} Originally aired on Solar Flix
33. ^ ^{ag} Originally aired on Heart of Asia Channel
34. ^ ^{ah} Originally aired on PIE Channel (now defunct)
35. ^ ^{ai} Originally aired on All TV
36. ^ ^{aj} Originally aired on One PH
37. ^ ^{ak} Originally aired on BuKo Channel

=== Video streaming services ===
The following are programs that debuted on video streaming services:

- January 3: Ang Mutya ng Section E on Viva One
- January 7: Wow Mani on VMX
- January 17: Incognito on Netflix
- January 18: Incognito on iWantTFC (now iWant)
- February 3: The Newsmaker: Just The Facts on NewsWatch Plus
- March 3: Slay on Viu
- April 11: Avenues of the Diamond on Viva One
- April 24: Maalaala Mo Kaya (2nd incarnation; season 31) on iWantTFC (now iWant)
- May 28: Bini Versus on YouTube (Bini)
- June 15: Seducing Drake Palma on Viva One
- June 16: Beauty Empire on Viu
- June 17: Kuan on One (season 3) on iWant and YouTube (ABS-CBN Entertainment)
- June 20: Love at First Spike on iWant
- July 15: Philippines' Most Shocking Stories (season 1) on YouTube (ABS-CBN News)
- July 16: Sparks Camp (season 3) on YouTube (ABS-CBN Entertainment)
- July 17: Bad Genius: The Series (Philippine adaptation) on Viva One
- July 18: It's Okay to Not Be Okay (Philippine adaptation) on Netflix
- July 19: Ghosting (season 1) and It's Okay to Not Be Okay (Philippine adaptation) on iWant
- August 15: Tropang G.O.A.T. on iWant
- September 5: I Love You Since 1892 on Viva One
- September 17: I-Listen with Kara David on YouTube (GMA Public Affairs)
- September 23: Bini World Tour Stories on iWant
- September 23: Possessed on YouTube (ABS-CBN News)
- October 17: What Lies Beneath on Netflix
- October 18: What Lies Beneath on iWant
- October 18: Golden Scenery of Tomorrow on Viva One
- October 24: S.O.C.O.: Scene of the Crime Operatives (2nd incarnation) on iWant
- October 28: Philippines' Most Shocking Stories (season 2) on YouTube (ABS-CBN News)
- November 1: Ghosting (season 2) on iWant
- November 2: TV Patrol Regional (2nd incarnation) on YouTube (ABS-CBN News)
- November 7: The Alibi on Amazon Prime Video
- November 11: AFAM Wives Club on iWant
- November 19: Benta Nights on iWant
- November 21: Roja on Netflix
- November 22: Roja on iWant
- November 25: Kuan on One (season 4) on iWant and YouTube (ABS-CBN Entertainment)
- December 5: Ang Mutya ng Section E: The Dark Side on Viva One

== Returning or renamed programs ==
=== Major networks ===
Show	Last aired	Retitled as/Season/Notes	Channel	Return date
Kamen Rider	2024 (season 30: "Zero-One")	Same (season 31: "Saber")	GMA	January 1
Lolong	2022	Same (Bayani ng Bayan)	GMA / GTV	January 20
Yo-kai Watch	2021	Yo-kai Watch!	GMA	January 27
Maka	2024	Same (season 2)	GMA	February 1
Pinas Sarap	2021	Same	GMA	February 9
Sing Galing!	2022 (2nd incarnation; season 2)	Same (2nd incarnation; season 3)	TV5 / BuKo Channel / Sari-Sari Channel	March 1
FPJ: Da King	2023 (A2Z / Kapamilya Channel / TV5)	FPJ sa GMA (2nd incarnation)	GMA	March 2
Pinoy Big Brother: Celebrity Edition	2008 (ABS-CBN; season 2: "Celebrity Edition 2")	Same (season 3: "Celebrity Collab Edition")	GMA	March 9
The Bureau of Magical Things	2021	Same (season 2)	GMA	March 10
Pilipinas Got Talent	2018 (ABS-CBN)	Same (season 7)	A2Z / Kapamilya Channel / TV5	March 29
American Idol	2025	Same (season 23)	TV5	April 6
Maalaala Mo Kaya	2022 (season 30)	Same (2nd incarnation; season 31)	A2Z / All TV / Kapamilya Channel	April 26
Totoy Bato	2009 (GMA)	Same (2025)	TV5 / Sari-Sari Channel	May 5
Emojination	2024	Same (season 5)	TV5 / BuKo Channel	May 17
Masked Singer Pilipinas	2022	Same (season 3)	TV5 / Sari-Sari Channel	May 17
Maka	2025	Same (season 3)	GMA	June 7
The Clash	2024	Same (season 7)	GMA	June 8
Encantadia	2017	Encantadia Chronicles: Sang'gre	GMA / GTV	June 16
Rainbow Rumble	2025 (A2Z / Kapamilya Channel / TV5)	Same (season 2)	A2Z / All TV / Kapamilya Channel	June 28
Kamen Rider	2025 (season 31: "Saber")	Same (season 32: "Revice")	GMA	June 30
Hidden Love	2020 (GMA News TV) / 2021 (Heart of Asia)	Same (Chinese adaptation)	GMA	July 7
Cine Cinco Hits	2024	Cine Cinco sa Hapon	TV5	July 14
One Piece	2020	Same (season 17)	GMA	July 21
MMK Klasik	2020 (DZMM TeleRadyo)	Maalaala Mo Kaya: Hugot from the Vault	A2Z / All TV / Kapamilya Channel	August 2
Oras ng Katotohanan	2018 (IBC / PTV)	Same	TV5	August 17
Maka	2025	Same (Lovestream)	GMA	September 6
The Voice Kids	2024	Same (season 7)	GMA	September 14
Sing Galing: Sing-lebrity Edition	2021 (Colours) / 2022 (TV5)	Same (season 2)	TV5 / BuKo Channel / Sari-Sari Channel	September 27
Your Face Sounds Familiar	2021 (A2Z / Kapamilya Channel)	Same (season 4)	A2Z / Kapamilya Channel / TV5	October 4
Bad Genius	2022 (GMA) / 2023 (Heart of Asia)	Same (Philippine adaptation)	TV5	October 18
Pinoy Big Brother: Celebrity Edition	2025 (season 3: "Celebrity Collab Edition")	Same (season 4: "Celebrity Collab Edition 2.0")	GMA	October 25
TV Patrol Regional	2020 (ABS-CBN Regional stations)	Same (2nd incarnation)	A2Z / Kapamilya Channel	November 16
Presinto 5	2013 (AksyonTV)	Same (2nd incarnation)	TV5 / One PH	November 23

=== State-owned networks ===
Show	Last aired	Retitled as/Season/Notes	Channel	Return date
Cooltura	2020	Same (season 3)	IBC	January 11
Sagisag Kultura TV	2023	Same	PTV	January 11
TV 13 News	1969	13 News	IBC	December 15

=== Minor networks ===
Show	Last aired	Retitled as/Season/Notes	Channel	Return date
Senior Moments	2022 (DZRH TV)	Same	Aliw 23 / DWIZ News TV	March 16
Basta Enerhiya, Sagot Kita!	2024	Same (season 2)	All TV	September 14
Showbiz na Showbiz	1987 (ABS-CBN)	Same (2nd incarnation)	Aliw 23 / DWIZ News TV	December 1

=== Other channels ===
Show	Last aired	Retitled as/Season/Notes	Channel	Return date
Lunchtime Movie Hits	2024 (GMA)	Noontime Movie Hits	GTV	January 1
UAAP Men's & Women's Volleyball	2024	Same (season 87)	One Sports / UAAP Varsity Channel	February 15
Spikers' Turf	2024 (season 7: "Invitational Conference")	Same (season 8: "Open Conference")	One Sports / One Sports+	February 21
Maharlika Pilipinas Basketball League	2024 (Media Pilipinas TV (MPTV) / One PH)	Same (season 7)	Solar Sports	March 8
Kasangga Mo ang Langit	2022 (RJ DigiTV)	Same	Bilyonaryo News Channel	March 15
Gus Abelgas Forensics	2024	Same (seasons 4 and 5)	One PH	March 22
Konek-Todo	2019 (DZMM TeleRadyo)	Serbisyong DSWD for Every Juan	PRTV Prime Media / TeleRadyo Serbisyo (now DZMM TeleRadyo)	March 29
Philippine Basketball Association	2025 (season 49: "Commissioner's Cup")	Same (season 49: "Philippine Cup")	PBA Rush / RPTV	April 4
NCAA Women's Volleyball	2024	Same (season 100)	GTV / Heart of Asia	April 22
Kwatro Kantos	2025	Kwatro Alas	PRTV Prime Media / TeleRadyo Serbisyo (now DZMM TeleRadyo)	April 26
FPJ: Hari ng Aksyon	2024 (Cine Mo!)	FPJ sa G! Flicks	GTV	May 16
The B Side	2024	Same (season 2)	Cinema One	May 23
Kaserbisyo Special Coverage	2025 (TeleRadyo Serbisyo / PRTV Prime Media)	DZMM Special Coverage (2nd incarnation)	DZMM TeleRadyo / PRTV Prime Media	May 29
Kaserbisyo Balita	2025 (TeleRadyo Serbisyo / PRTV Prime Media)	DZMM Balita Ngayon (2nd incarnation)	DZMM TeleRadyo / PRTV Prime Media	May 30
Radyo 630 Balita	2025 (TeleRadyo Serbisyo)	Radyo Patrol Balita Alas-Kwatro (2nd incarnation)	DZMM TeleRadyo	June 2
Johnson, Ikwento Mo	2025 (TeleRadyo Serbisyo / PRTV Prime Media)	Ronda Pasada	DZMM TeleRadyo	June 2
TeleRadyo Serbisyo Balita	2025 (TeleRadyo Serbisyo / PRTV Prime Media)	Radyo Patrol Balita Alas-Siyete (2nd incarnation)	DZMM TeleRadyo / PRTV Prime Media	June 2
S.R.O.: Suhestyon, Reaksyon, at Opinyon	2023 (TeleRadyo)	Tandem ng Bayan	DZMM TeleRadyo / PRTV Prime Media	June 2
Maalaala Mo Kaya sa DZMM	2010	Same (2nd incarnation)	DZMM TeleRadyo / PRTV Prime Media	June 2
Tatak: Serbisyo	2025 (TeleRadyo Serbisyo / PRTV Prime Media)	Aksyon Ngayon (2nd incarnation)	DZMM TeleRadyo / PRTV Prime Media	June 2
Showbiz Sidelines	2025 (TeleRadyo Serbisyo / PRTV Prime Media)	Alam na Dis!	DZMM TeleRadyo / PRTV Prime Media	June 2
TeleRadyo Balita Weekend	2022 (TeleRadyo)	Radyo Patrol Balita Alas-Siyete Weekend (2nd incarnation)	DZMM TeleRadyo / PRTV Prime Media	June 7
Expertalk	2024 (PTV)	Same (season 5)	GTV	June 7
Premier Volleyball League	2025 (season 8: "All-Filipino Conference")	Same (season 8: "on Tour"; season 21 as Shakey's V-League)	One Sports / One Sports+ / RPTV	June 22
Chinese by Blood, Filipino by Heart	2024 (One News)	Chinese by Blood, Global by Heart	Bilyonaryo News Channel	June 29
It's a Beautiful Day!	2025	Beautiful Day	Bilyonaryo News Channel	July 14
Ma-Beauty Po Naman	2020	PinaSigla!	DZMM TeleRadyo / PRTV Prime Media	August 2
Healing Galing	2025 (GMA)	Healing Galing with Doc E	GTV	August 2
Premier Volleyball League	2025 (season 8: "on Tour")	Same (season 8: "Invitational Conference"; season 21 as Shakey's V-League)	One Sports / One Sports+	August 21
OMJ: Oh My Job	2022 (GTV)	Aksyon DOLE sa DZMM	DZMM TeleRadyo / PRTV Prime Media	August 30
Ms. M Confidential	2012	Kwento Nights	DZMM TeleRadyo	September 1
University Athletic Association of the Philippines	2025	Same (season 88)	One Sports / UAAP Varsity Channel	September 19
Siyensikat	2025 (PTV)	Same (season 6)	GTV	September 20
National Collegiate Athletic Association	2025	Same (season 101)	GTV / Heart of Asia	October 1
Philippine Basketball Association	2025 (season 49: "Philippine Cup")	Same (season 50: "Philippine Cup")	PBA Rush / RPTV	October 5
Premier Volleyball League	2025 (season 8: "Invitational Conference")	Same (season 8: "Reinforced Conference"; season 21 as Shakey's V-League)	One Sports / One Sports+	October 7
East Asia Super League	2025	Same (2025–26 season)	One Sports / One Sports+ / PBA Rush / RPTV	October 8
Failon Ngayon	2020 (ABS-CBN / ANC / Jeepney TV)	Think About It	RPTV	October 11
Tambayan sa Barangay 1206	2025	Barangay 13	DWAN TV	October 20
National Basketball Association	2025	Same (2025–26 season)	NBA TV Philippines / One Sports / RPTV	October 22
Spikers' Turf	2025 (season 8: "Open Conference")	Same (season 8: "Invitational Conference")	One Sports / One Sports+	October 27
Biyaheng RH	2020 (DZRH News Television)	Biyaheng IZ	DWIZ News TV	December 1

=== Video streaming services ===
Show	Last aired	Retitled as/Season/Notes	Service	Return date
Kuan on One	2025	Same (season 3)	iWant and YouTube (ABS-CBN Entertainment)	June 17
Sparks Camp	2024 (YouTube; Black Sheep)	Same (season 3)	YouTube (ABS-CBN Entertainment)	July 16
Bad Genius	2022 (GMA) / 2023 (Heart of Asia)	Same (Philippine adaptation)	Viva One	July 17
S.O.C.O.: Scene of the Crime Operatives	2020 (Kapamilya Channel / TeleRadyo)	Same (2nd incarnation; season 1)	iWant	October 24
Philippines' Most Shocking Stories	2025	Same (season 2)	YouTube (ABS-CBN News)	October 28
Ghosting	2025	Same (season 2)	iWant	November 1
TV Patrol Regional	2020 (ABS-CBN Regional stations)	Same (2nd incarnation)	YouTube (ABS-CBN News)	November 2
Kuan on One	2025	Same (season 4)	iWant and YouTube (ABS-CBN Entertainment)	November 25
Ang Mutya ng Section E	2025 (season 1)	Same (The Dark Side)	Viva One	December 5

== Programs transferring networks ==
=== Major networks ===
Date	Show	No. of seasons	Moved from	Moved to
March 2	FPJ: Da King	—N/a	A2Z / Kapamilya Channel / TV5	GMA (as FPJ sa GMA)
March 9	Pinoy Big Brother: Celebrity Edition	3 (as Celebrity Collab Edition)	ABS-CBN (now Kapamilya Channel)	GMA
March 29	Pilipinas Got Talent	7	ABS-CBN (now Kapamilya Channel)	A2Z / Kapamilya Channel / TV5
May 5	Totoy Bato	—N/a	GMA (as the original 2009 TV series)	TV5 / Sari-Sari Channel (as the remake)
July 7	Hidden Love	—N/a	GMA News TV (now GTV) / Heart of Asia	GMA (as the Chinese adaptation)
August 2	MMK Klasik	—N/a	DZMM TeleRadyo	A2Z / All TV / Kapamilya Channel (as Maalaala Mo Kaya: Hugot from the Vault)
August 17	Oras ng Katotohanan	—N/a	IBC / PTV	TV5
October 18	Bad Genius	—N/a	GMA / Heart of Asia	TV5 (as the Philippine adaptation)
November 16	TV Patrol Regional	—N/a	ABS-CBN Regional stations (now defunct)	A2Z / Kapamilya Channel
November 23	Presinto 5	—N/a	AksyonTV (now One Sports)	TV5 / One PH

=== Minor networks ===
Date	Show	No. of seasons	Moved from	Moved to
March 16	Senior Moments	—N/a	DZRH TV	Aliw 23 / DWIZ News TV
June 28	Rainbow Rumble	2	TV5	All TV
December 1	Showbiz na Showbiz	—N/a	ABS-CBN (now Kapamilya Channel)	Aliw 23 / DWIZ News TV

=== Other channels ===
Date	Show	No. of seasons	Moved from	Moved to
January 1	Lunchtime Movie Hits	—N/a	GMA	GTV (as Noontime Movie Hits)
March 8	Maharlika Pilipinas Basketball League	7	Media Pilipinas TV (MPTV) / One PH	Solar Sports
March 15	Kasangga Mo ang Langit	—N/a	RJ DigiTV	Bilyonaryo News Channel
March 29	Kwatro Kantos	—N/a	Bilyonaryo News Channel	PRTV Prime Media / TeleRadyo Serbisyo (now DZMM TeleRadyo)
May 16	FPJ: Hari ng Aksyon	—N/a	Cine Mo!	GTV (as FPJ sa G! Flicks)
June 7	Expertalk	5	PTV	GTV
June 29	Chinese by Blood, Filipino by Heart	—N/a	One News	Bilyonaryo News Channel (as Chinese by Blood, Global by Heart)
August 2	Healing Galing	—N/a	GMA	GTV (as Healing Galing with Doc E)
August 30	OMJ: Oh My Job	—N/a	GTV	DZMM TeleRadyo / PRTV Prime Media (as Aksyon DOLE sa DZMM)
September 20	Siyensikat	6	PTV	GTV
October 11	Failon Ngayon	—N/a	ABS-CBN (now Kapamilya Channel) / ANC / Jeepney TV	RPTV (as Think About It)
December 1	Biyaheng RH	—N/a	DZRH News Television (now DZRH TV)	DWIZ News TV (as Biyaheng IZ)

=== Video streaming services ===
Date	Show	No. of seasons	Moved from	Moved to
July 16	Sparks Camp	3	YouTube (Black Sheep)	YouTube (ABS-CBN Entertainment)
July 17	Bad Genius	—N/a	GMA / Heart of Asia	Viva One (as the Philippine adaptation)
November 2	TV Patrol Regional	—N/a	ABS-CBN Regional stations (now defunct)	YouTube (ABS-CBN News)

== Milestone episodes ==
The following shows made their Milestone episodes in 2025:

Show	Network	Episode #	Episode title	Episode air date
FPJ's Batang Quiapo	A2Z / Kapamilya Channel / TV5	500th	"Di Iiwan"	January 16
Lavender Fields	A2Z / Jeepney TV / Kapamilya Channel / TV5	100th	"Ang Huling Pagtutuos"	January 17
Lumuhod Ka Sa Lupa	TV5 / Sari-Sari Channel	200th	"Giyera"	January 17
Ang Himala ni Niño	TV5	100th	"100th Episode"	February 14
All-Out Sundays	GMA	200th	"FEBtastic"	February 23
Cayetano in Action with Boy Abunda	GMA	100th	"100th Episode"	February 23
Afternoon Delight	One News	300th	"300th Episode"	March 11
Family Feud (4th incarnation)	GMA	700th	"DZBB vs LS"	March 25
It's Showtime	A2Z / All TV / GMA / Kapamilya Channel	4,300th	"Puksaan"	March 27
Resibo: Walang Lusot ang May Atraso	GMA	100th	"100th Episode"	March 30
Prinsesa ng City Jail	GMA	100th	"Sacrifice"	May 19
Fast Talk with Boy Abunda	GMA	600th	"Pooh and Pokwang"	May 20
Gud Morning Kapatid	TV5 / RPTV	500th	"500th Episode"	May 22
Mga Batang Riles	GMA / GTV	100th	"Balik Ronda"	May 28
Tao Po!	A2Z / Kapamilya Channel	100th	"100th Episode"	June 1
FPJ's Batang Quiapo	A2Z / Kapamilya Channel / TV5	600th	"Kinilala"	June 9
Incognito	A2Z / Jeepney TV / Kapamilya Channel / TV5	100th	"In Plain Sight"	June 10
Lolong: Bayani ng Bayan	GMA / GTV	100th	"Bunyag"	June 11
My Puhunan: Kaya Mo!	A2Z / Kapamilya Channel	100th	"100th Episode"	June 15
Pinoy Big Brother: Celebrity Collab Edition	GMA	100th	"First Big 4"	June 23
Binibining Marikit	GMA	100th	"The Finale"	June 27
Mommy Dearest	GMA	100th	"Shocking Revelation"	July 15
It's Showtime	A2Z / All TV / GMA / Kapamilya Channel	4,400th	"Happy Day"	July 24
Afternoon Delight	One News	400th	"400th Episode"	August 1
Bagong Pilipinas: PBBM Lingkod Ng Bayan	IBC	100th	"100th Episode"	August 3
Family Feud (4th incarnation)	GMA	800th	"TGIS Reunion"	August 15
Bubble Gang	GMA	1,500th	"Rich Kid Ka Kasi"	August 31
Totoy Bato	TV5 / Sari-Sari Channel	100th	"Pangangalang"	September 22
Fast Talk with Boy Abunda	GMA	700th	"Cassy and Mavy Legaspi"	October 9
FPJ's Batang Quiapo	A2Z / Kapamilya Channel / TV5	700th	"Mag-Amang Montenegro"	October 27
Encantadia Chronicles: Sang'gre	GMA / GTV	100th	"Flame of Revenge"	October 31
Gud Morning Kapatid	TV5 / RPTV	600th	"600th Episode"	November 6
Sanggang-Dikit FR	GMA / GTV	100th	"Bitag"	November 7
Sins of the Father	A2Z / Jeepney TV / Kapamilya Channel / TV5	100th	"Rebellion of the Father"	November 7
It's Showtime	A2Z / All TV / GMA / Kapamilya Channel	4,500th	"Paborito Natin"	November 25
Cruz vs Cruz	GMA	100th	"Acting Strange"	December 4
Regal Studio Presents	GMA	200th	"Wrong Number, Right Family"	December 7
Afternoon Delight	One News	500th	"500th Episode"	December 19
Rated Korina	A2Z / All TV / Kapamilya Channel / TV5	1,100th	"1,100th Episode"	December 21

== Finales ==
=== Major networks ===
==== A2Z ====
The following are programs that ended on A2Z:

- January 3: The Killer Bride
- January 11: Walang Hanggang Paalam (rerun)
- January 17: Lavender Fields
- January 24: Pinoy Big Brother: Gen 11 Big 4 Ever and Taxi Driver
- February 15: Super Inggo at ang Super Tropa (Kidz Weekend)
- February 28: How to Spot a Red Flag
- March 7: The Untamed
- March 23: Rainbow Rumble (season 1)
- April 12: Time to Dance
- April 16: Liar
- May 9: Meteor Garden (2001)
- June 13: Happiness
- June 22: Pilipinas Got Talent (season 7)
- June 27: Goin' Bulilit (season 9) and Saving Grace: The Untold Story
- July 4: Viral Scandal (rerun)
- July 18: Incognito
- July 25: Meteor Garden II
- July 26: Maalaala Mo Kaya (2nd incarnation; season 31)
- August 2: Huwag Kang Mangamba (rerun)
- September 28: Idol Kids Philippines
- October 3: Unchained Love
- October 17: It's Okay to Not Be Okay (Philippine adaptation)
- November 21: Sins of the Father
- November 29: Linlang: The Teleserye Version (rerun)
- December 5: Pamilya Sagrado (rerun)

===== Stopped airing =====
Program	Last airing	Resumed airing	Reason
Afternoon Zinema (A2Z Zinema)	March 7	June 30	Programming break.
Kapamilya, Deal or No Deal (seasons 4 and 5)	March 7	July 28	Program was temporarily replaced by the reruns of Meteor Garden (2001) and Meteor Garden II as the host of the show ran as a candidate for a local position in the 2025 elections.
Jesus the Healer	October 25	December 6	Pre-empted by the 5-part special of Jesus Is Lord Church 47th anniversary.
Mega Blockbusters	November 30	December 21	Pre-empted by Bini Chapter 3: Hanggang Dulo on December 7 and Part 2 of Love, Joy, Hope: The ABS-CBN Christmas Special 2025 on December 14.
Maalaala Mo Kaya: Hugot from the Vault	December 6	December 20	Pre-empted by Part 1 of Love, Joy, Hope: The ABS-CBN Christmas Special 2025 on December 13.
Tao Po!	December 6	December 20	Pre-empted by Part 1 of Love, Joy, Hope: The ABS-CBN Christmas Special 2025 on December 13.

==== All TV ====
The following are programs that ended on All TV:

- January 3: Agua Bendita
- January 10: Again My Life (rerun)
- January 17: Kadenang Ginto
- January 31: If You Wish Upon Me (rerun) and Pangako sa 'Yo (2015)
- February 7: Love Thy Woman
- February 8: Bagong Umaga
- February 28: Nang Ngumiti ang Langit
- March 2: Nathaniel
- March 7: From Now On, Showtime! (rerun) and Kapamilya, Deal or No Deal (season 5)
- March 14: All of Me
- March 21: Mga Anghel na Walang Langit
- March 22: Good Vibes
- March 28: Kung Fu Kids
- April 11: Why Her? (rerun)
- April 18: Starla
- May 2: A Beautiful Affair
- May 9: Bagito
- May 23: Calla Lily
- May 25: Ikaw Lamang
- May 30: River Where the Moon Rises (rerun)
- June 20: Hawak Kamay
- June 21: Halik
- June 22: Hiram
- June 27: Goin' Bulilit (season 9)
- July 5: Lastikman
- July 25: Angelito: Batang Ama
- July 26: Maalaala Mo Kaya (2nd incarnation; season 31)
- August 1: My Dear Heart
- August 8: Dolce Amore and The General's Daughter
- August 29: Honesto
- September 7: Sparks Camp (seasons 1 and 2)
- September 14: Mangarap Ka
- September 26: Ina, Kapatid, Anak
- October 10: My Super D
- October 17: Ningning
- November 2: Basta Enerhiya, Sagot Kita! (season 2), Hiwaga ng Kambat and What's Wrong with Secretary Kim (Philippine adaptation)
- November 14: Kokey at Ako, Noah and The Greatest Love
- November 21: Galema: Anak ni Zuma
- November 30: Kingdom Force
- December 5: Hiram na Mukha
- December 7: Ang Munting Paraiso
- December 19: Little Champ, Maging Sino Ka Man (2006) and The Legal Wife
- December 27: Super Inggo
- December 28: Flower of Evil, Kampanerang Kuba (rerun), M.O.M.S — Mhies on a Mission, Sa Puso Ko, Iingatan Ka and Ysabella

==== GMA ====
The following are programs that ended on GMA Network:

- January 9: Asawa ng Asawa Ko
- January 10: Shining Inheritance (Philippine adaptation) and Stealer: The Treasure Keeper
- January 17: Flames of Vengeance, Love at First Night and Widows' War
- January 25: Heart World (season 1) and Karelasyon (rerun)
- January 31: When the Sky Falls
- February 2: Walang Matigas na Pulis sa Matinik na Misis (season 3)
- February 8: Lilet Matias: Attorney-at-Law
- February 15: Aliens Ninano
- February 16: Aha!
- February 21: Forever Young
- February 23: GMA Blockbusters and Pinas Sarap
- March 1: Dear SV and Sparkle U (rerun)
- March 7: Kamen Rider Saber
- March 14: Perfect Marriage Revenge
- March 20: My Ilonggo Girl
- March 22: Cardcaptor Sakura: Clear Card
- March 28: Agency and The Bureau of Magical Things (season 2)
- March 30: Oggy and the Cockroaches (rerun)
- April 16: Just for Laughs Gags (rerun) and Wicked-in-Law
- May 9: Yo-kai Watch!
- May 24: Maka (season 2) and Yashahime (season 1)
- May 30: Oh My Boss
- June 7: Where in Manila
- June 13: Lolong: Bayani ng Bayan and Slay
- June 20: Mga Batang Riles and Red Balloon
- June 21: Magic Kaito (rerun) and Prinsesa ng City Jail
- June 27: Binibining Marikit and The Legend of Shen Li
- June 28: Healing Galing
- June 29: Kung Fu Panda: The Paws of Destiny
- July 4: The Cheery Lee, Village Headman
- July 5: Pinoy Big Brother: Celebrity Collab Edition
- July 12: A.D. The Bible Continues
- July 18: Dr. Stone (season 1) and Mommy Dearest
- August 16: Maka (season 3)
- August 22: The Lovely Runner
- August 23: Power Rangers Beast Morphers (rerun)
- September 5: Bossam: Steal the Fate and Kamen Rider Revice
- September 6: Desirable Flowers
- September 7: The Clash (season 7)
- September 26: Hidden Love (Chinese adaptation)
- September 27: Knockout (rerun) and Pinoy M.D.
- September 28: The Little Prince and Friends
- October 2: Beauty Empire
- October 5: The Bible
- October 11: My Father's Wife
- October 17: One Ordinary Day
- October 18: Stars on the Floor (season 1)
- October 23: Kapuso Primetime Cinema (weeknight edition)
- October 31: Akusada
- November 1: Angry Birds Toons (rerun) and Wicked-in-Law (rerun)
- December 13: Maka Lovestream
- December 14: The Voice Kids (season 7)
- December 26: When I Marry a Stranger
- December 28: The Amazing Spiez!

===== Stopped airing =====
Program	Last airing	Resumed airing	Reason
Kapuso Primetime Cinema (weeknight edition)	January 2	October 6	Programming break.
GMA Blockbusters	January 19	February 2	Pre-empted by Josh Cullen: Lost and Found Album Concert.
Magpakailanman	January 25	February 8	Pre-empted by Sa Gitna ng Unos, The Benhur Abalos Life Story and Tanong ng Bayan: The GMA Senatorial Face-Off 2025.
I-Witness	January 25	February 8	Pre-empted by Sa Gitna ng Unos, The Benhur Abalos Life Story and Tanong ng Bayan: The GMA Senatorial Face-Off 2025.
Reporter's Notebook	January 25	February 8	Pre-empted by Sa Gitna ng Unos, The Benhur Abalos Life Story and Tanong ng Bayan: The GMA Senatorial Face-Off 2025.
Just for Laughs Gags (rerun)	March 7	March 31	Programming break.
Daig Kayo ng Lola Ko (season 5)	April 12	May 10	Pre-empted by GMA Holy Week 2025 Programming. and Biyaheng Totoo: Sana sa Eleksyon 2025.
The Bible	April 27	August 3	Program was temporarily replaced by Detective Conan (season 7). and reruns of Power Rangers Beast Morphers.
Born to be Wild	April 27	May 11	Pre-empted by Miss Universe Philippines 2025.
iBilib	April 27	May 11	Pre-empted by Miss Universe Philippines 2025.
Tadhana	May 10	May 24	Pre-empted by Philippine Defenders.
Wish Ko Lang!	May 10	May 24	Pre-empted by Philippine Defenders.
Amazing Earth	June 6	July 11	Pre-empted by the final episode of Slay on June 13 and temporarily replaced by the remaining episodes of Pinoy Big Brother: Celebrity Collab Edition until July 4.
Daig Kayo ng Lola Ko (season 5)	June 14	July 12	Pre-empted by the Week 1 recap of Encantadia Chronicles: Sang'gre on June 21 and temporarily replaced by the remaining episodes of Pinoy Big Brother: Celebrity Collab Edition until The Big Night on July 5.
Knockout (rerun)	June 14	July 5	Pre-empted by the 2-part special of Be-Cool: The Express Adventure.
Stars on the Floor (season 1)	July 5	July 19	Pre-empted by Beyond 75: The GMA 75th Anniversary Special.
Magpakailanman	July 5	July 19	Pre-empted by Beyond 75: The GMA 75th Anniversary Special.
The Boobay and Tekla Show	October 19	December 21	Programming break.
Amazing Earth	October 24	March 14, 2026	Programming break.
Daig Kayo ng Lola Ko (season 5)	November 8	November 22	Pre-empted by Broken Roads, Broken Promises.
I-Witness	November 8	November 22	Pre-empted by Broken Roads, Broken Promises.

==== TV5 ====
The following are programs that ended on TV5:

- January 5: American Idol (season 22)
- January 17: Lavender Fields
- January 18: Quizmosa
- January 24: Pinoy Big Brother: Gen 11 Big 4 Ever and Taxi Driver
- February 28: How to Spot a Red Flag
- March 7: The Second Chance (Thai adaptation) and The Untamed
- March 21: PJ Masks
- March 22: Cinco Serye Specials Presents and Wow Mali: Doble Tawa (rerun)
- March 23: America's Got Talent: Fantasy Team and Rainbow Rumble (season 1)
- April 11: Ang Himala ni Niño
- April 16: Liar
- April 19: SpongeBob SquarePants (seasons 1–3; rerun)
- April 25: Wil To Win
- May 2: Lumuhod Ka Sa Lupa
- May 3: Marimar (1994; rerun)
- May 10: Aplikante, Balwarte and Be The Next: 9 Dreamers
- May 11: Da Pers Family
- May 23: Sa Ngalan ng Ina (rerun)
- May 30: Mr. Queen
- June 13: Happiness
- June 20: Saving Grace: The Untold Story
- June 22: Pilipinas Got Talent (season 7)
- June 27: The Adventures of Puss in Boots (rerun)
- June 29: Jurassic World Camp Cretaceous (rerun)
- July 11: Babaeng Hampaslupa (rerun) and Secret Royal Inspector & Joy
- July 18: Ang Mutya ng Section E (season 1) and Incognito
- July 19: Gretchen Ho Reports
- August 1: Glamorosa (rerun)
- August 3: Sing Galing! (2nd incarnation; season 3)
- September 6: Emojination (season 5)
- September 13: Moonbug Cartoons (rerun)
  - September 13: Cocomelon, Go Buster and Little Baby Bum
- September 20: Rosalinda (1999)
- September 21: Masked Singer Pilipinas (season 3)
- September 28: Idol Kids Philippines
- October 3: Seducing Drake Palma and Unchained Love
- October 10: Betty sa NY (rerun)
- October 17: It's Okay to Not Be Okay (Philippine adaptation)
- November 21: Sins of the Father
- November 29: Love on the Clock
- December 14: Fast & Furious Spy Racers
- December 26: Dog of Flanders
- December 28: Your Face Sounds Familiar (season 4)

===== Stopped airing =====
Program	Last airing	Resumed airing	Reason
The Second Chance (Thai adaptation)	January 26	February 3	Programming break.
Top 5: Mga Kwentong Marc Logan	February 1	February 15	Pre-empted by Stories of Tomorrow.
Top 5: Mga Kwentong Marc Logan	July 13	July 27	Pre-empted by the boxing match between Manny Pacquiao and American boxer Mario Barrios.
Top 5: Mga Kwentong Marc Logan	November 16	January 4, 2026	Programming break.
Da Pers Family	February 9	March 30	Programming break.
Pinoy Explorer (rerun)	March 23	May 10	Programming break.
American Idol (season 23)	April 20	May 4	Pre-empted by Manindigan.
American Idol (season 23)	June 8	June 22	Pre-empted by Binibining Pilipinas 2025.
CCF Worship Service	June 8	June 22	Pre-empted by Binibining Pilipinas 2025.
The Men's Room	June 8	June 22	Pre-empted by Binibining Pilipinas 2025.
Cine Cinco Astig Sunday	July 13	July 27	Pre-empted by the boxing match between Manny Pacquiao and American boxer Mario Barrios.
Julius Babao Unplugged	July 13	July 27	Pre-empted by the boxing match between Manny Pacquiao and American boxer Mario Barrios.
Rated Korina	July 13	July 27	Pre-empted by the boxing match between Manny Pacquiao and American boxer Mario Barrios.
ASAP	December 28	October 18, 2026 (ASAP XP)	Programming break.
Rated Korina	December 28	September 13, 2026	Programming break.

=== State-owned networks ===
==== PTV ====
The following are programs that ended on People's Television Network:

- January 5: Siyensikat (season 5)
- February 7: Punto Asintado Reload
- February 9: Sagisag Kultura TV
- April 13: Tuklas Yaman
- May 7: Know Your Candidates
- May 16: Balitang Pambansa
- June 14: COMELEC: Usapang Halalan
- July 27: ABU Sports
- September 4: Mike Abe Live
- September 6: ASEAN Para Sa'yo
- October 25: Maaram
- November 22: Oras ng Himala

==== Stopped airing ====
Program	Last airing	Resumed airing	Reason
Iskoolmates	January 2	January 16	Pre-empted by Nazareno 2025: Special Coverage.
COMELEC: Usapang Halalan	April 12	May 3	Pre-empted by Paalam, Santo Papa Francisco: A Special Coverage.
PTV Sports Weekend	April 12	May 3	Pre-empted by Paalam, Santo Papa Francisco: A Special Coverage.
Ulat Bayan Weekend	April 20	April 27	Pre-empted by Paalam, Santo Papa Francisco: A Special Coverage.
ABU Sports	April 25	April 27	Pre-empted by Paalam, Santo Papa Francisco: A Special Coverage.
In Person	July 11	July 25	Pre-empted by Bagyong Crising: Special Coverage.
Ulat Bayan Weekend	July 13	July 20	Pre-empted by Bagyong Crising: Special Coverage.
PTV News Tonight	July 18	July 25	Pre-empted by HABAGAT: An Integrated State Media (ISM) Special Coverage and BAGYO AT HABAGAT: An Integrated State Media (ISM) Special Coverage.
Bagong Pilipinas Ngayon	July 21	July 24	Pre-empted by HABAGAT: An Integrated State Media (ISM) Special Coverage and BAGYO AT HABAGAT: An Integrated State Media (ISM) Special Coverage.
Sentro Balita	July 21	July 25	Pre-empted by HABAGAT: An Integrated State Media (ISM) Special Coverage and BAGYO AT HABAGAT: An Integrated State Media (ISM) Special Coverage.
Sentro Balita	September 19	September 23	Pre-empted by Super Bagyong Nando: An Integrated State Media (ISM) Special Coverage.
Ulat Bayan Weekend	September 20	September 27	Pre-empted by Super Bagyong Nando: An Integrated State Media (ISM) Special Coverage.
Sentro Balita	September 25	September 29	Pre-empted by Bagyong Opong: An Integrated State Media (ISM) Special Coverage.
PTV News Tonight	September 25	September 29	Pre-empted by Bagyong Opong: An Integrated State Media (ISM) Special Coverage.
Sentro Balita Weekend	October 5	October 12	Pre-empted by PAGYANIG SA VISAYAS AT MINDANAO: An Integrated State Media (ISM) Special Coverage.
Ulat Bayan Weekend	October 5	October 12	Pre-empted by PAGYANIG SA VISAYAS AT MINDANAO: An Integrated State Media (ISM) Special Coverage.
PTV News Tonight	October 9	October 13	Pre-empted by PAGYANIG SA VISAYAS AT MINDANAO: An Integrated State Media (ISM) Special Coverage.
Sentro Balita	November 7	November 11	Pre-empted by Bagyong Uwan: An Integrated State Media (ISM) Special Coverage.
Ulat Bayan	November 7	November 11	Pre-empted by Bagyong Uwan: An Integrated State Media (ISM) Special Coverage.
Sentro Balita Weekend	November 8	November 15	Pre-empted by Bagyong Uwan: An Integrated State Media (ISM) Special Coverage.
Ulat Bayan Weekend	November 8	November 15	Pre-empted by Bagyong Uwan: An Integrated State Media (ISM) Special Coverage.
PTV News Tonight	December 30	January 1, 2026	Pre-empted by Tindog: PTV Year-End Special 2025
Sentro Balita	December 31	January 2, 2026	Pre-empted by Tindog: PTV Year-End Special 2025

==== IBC ====
The following are programs that ended on IBC:

- May 2: Kandidato
- May 16: Balitang Pambansa
- July 5: Dok True Ba? (season 3)
- July 20: Cooltura (season 2)
- August 24: Legally Speaking (season 1)

==== Stopped airing ====
Program	Last airing	Resumed airing	Reason
Dok True Ba?	July 5	April 19, 2026	Season break.
Chairman’s Report with Dante "Klink" Ang	July 11	July 25	Pre-empted by Bagyong Crising: Special Coverage.
IpaBITAG Mo	July 25	July 29	Pre-empted by SONA 2025 Special Coverage.
Ala-Una sa Balita	November 4	November 6	Pre-empted by Bagyong Tino: An Integrated State (ISM) Special Coverage.
Ala-Una sa Balita	November 7	November 11	Pre-empted by Bagyong Uwan: An Integrated State Media (ISM) Special Coverage.
Ala-Una sa Balita	December 23	December 29	Programming break.
Congress News	December 23	December 29	Programming break.
Chairman’s Report with Dante "Klink" Ang	December 26	February 13, 2026	Season break.

=== Minor networks ===
The following are programs that ended on minor networks:

- February 8: Aprub and CMV Spotlight on Net 25
- February 9: GoodWill (season 5) on Net 25
- February 14: CFO Today and Love Designer on Net 25
- February 15: CFO Updates on Net 25
- March 7: Love Me, Love My Voice and Strict ang Mommy Ko on Net 25
- March 9: OPM sa DWIZ on Aliw 23
- March 9: Shopping All the Way! on Net 25
- March 14: Gracious Revenge on Net 25
- March 28: Arangkada Balita (3rd incarnation) on Aliw 23
- March 30: Kimba: The White Lion, Simba Jr. and the Football World Cup and Speed Racer: The Next Generation on Net 25
- April 25: Hello, My Shining Love (rerun) on Net 25
- April 27: ASOP Music Festival on UNTV
- May 3: Heart of Wisdom and I Love Jesus Street Mission on Light TV
- May 9: Grandfather Reads on Light TV
- May 29: Batas et Al (revived version) on Aliw 23
- May 30: Net 25 World News on Net 25
- June 6: House of Bluebird (rerun) on Net 25
- June 13: Rising With the Wind on Net 25
- June 21: Motorcycle Republic on Net 25
- July 11: A Date with the Future on Net 25
- July 17: Dooley and Pals on Light TV
- July 20: Senior Citizens Forum on Aliw 23
- September 5: As Beautiful as You on Net 25
- October 3: Best Choice Ever on Net 25
- October 17: Go Go Squid! on Net 25
- November 3: Animated Bible Stories and Tales of Little Women on Light TV
- November 4: 3-2-1 Penguins and Paws and Tales on Light TV
- November 5: Auto-B-Good and Bugtime Adventures on Light TV
- November 9: VeggieTales on Light TV
- November 14: Kimchi Family on Net 25
- November 28: BaliTambayan on Aliw 23
- November 30: Drive Through History and Why Israel Matters on Light TV
- December 12: Syndrome on Net 25

==== Stopped airing ====
Program	Channel	Last airing	Resumed airing	Reason
May For Ever	Net 25	April 12	April 26	Pre-empted by Mata ng Halalan: 25 Tanong ng Bayan.
Tara Game, Agad-Agad! Level Up!	Net 25	April 13	April 27	Pre-empted by Mata ng Halalan: 25 Tanong ng Bayan.
Wansapanataym	All TV	August 24	November 8	Program replaced by the reruns of Hiwaga ng Kambat.
Usapang Kids	Light TV	November 9	December 7	Program temporarily replaced by the reruns of Tiny Kitchen.

=== Other channels ===
The following are programs that ended on other channels:

- January 2: Home EcoNanay on Radyo Pilipinas 1 Television
- January 3: The Long Ballad on Heart of Asia
- January 3: Agua Bendita (rerun) and Lorenzo's Time (rerun) on Jeepney TV
- January 3: The Killer Bride on Kapamilya Channel
- January 3: It's Showtime and Siesta Fiesta Movies on GTV
- January 3: Operation Lokal and Otro Cinco on Radyo Pilipinas 1 Television
- January 9: Asawa ng Asawa Ko on GTV
- January 10: Douluo Continent (rerun) on Heart of Asia
- January 10: Precious Hearts Romances Presents: Mana Po (rerun) on Jeepney TV
- January 11: Konsyumer Atbp. (Dobol B TV) on GTV
- January 11: Walang Hanggang Paalam (rerun) on Kapamilya Channel
- January 12: Dinofroz (rerun) on GTV
- January 17: Widows' War on GTV
- January 17: Kadenang Ginto (rerun) and Lavender Fields on Jeepney TV
- January 17: Lavender Fields on Kapamilya Channel
- January 17: Quizmosa on True TV
- January 19: Decoding Duterte, Duyan ka Magiting, Filipiknow, Grid, Pamana, Panatang Pilipino, Sa Ngalan ng Katotohanan, Storya ng Bayan at Ugat ng Lahi on Pilipinas HD
- January 24: Top Senate Stories on DWAN TV
- January 24: Yumi's Cells on GTV
- January 24: Shooting Stars on Heart of Asia
- January 24: Iisa Pa Lamang (rerun) and Taxi Driver on Jeepney TV
- January 24: Pinoy Big Brother: Gen 11 Big 4 Ever and Taxi Driver on Kapamilya Channel
- January 25: Guns and Roses on Cine Mo!
- January 25: Night Life with Sister L on DZRH TV
- January 26: Walang Kapalit on Jeepney TV
- January 30: Building Bridges (rerun) on RPTV
- January 31: Biglang Sibol, Bayang Impasibol, Daddy Di Do Du and Okay Ka, Fairy Ko! on BuKo Channel
- January 31: Bleach (season 2), Detective Conan (season 9) and Jinxed at First on Heart of Asia
- January 31: Pangako sa 'Yo (2015; rerun) on Jeepney TV
- February 1: Love in the Moonlight (rerun) on GTV
- February 2: Fill in the Bank on BuKo Channel
- February 2: Bubble Gang and The Good Life on GTV
- February 2: Boy For Rent and Third Rail on Heart of Asia
- February 7: Dr. Tang and Hello from the Other Side (rerun) on Heart of Asia
- February 7: Love Thy Woman (rerun) on Jeepney TV
- February 7: Brunch and One News Now on One News
- February 8: Kanya-Kanyang Problema on DZRH TV
- February 8: Ultraman Taiga on Heart of Asia
- February 8: Bagong Umaga (rerun) on Jeepney TV
- February 14: Eclipse of the Heart on Heart of Asia
- February 15: Hanggang Saan (rerun) on Jeepney TV
- February 15: Super Inggo at ang Super Tropa on Kapamilya Channel
- February 15: Buhay Unleash on True TV
- February 16: Meteo Heroes (rerun) on GTV
- February 21: Another Miss Oh (rerun) and When Duty Calls (rerun) on Heart of Asia
- February 22: Dino Dana on Heart of Asia
- February 23: Martin Mystery (rerun) and The Worst Witch (season 1) on GTV
- February 28: Newsfeed Business on Bilyonaryo News Channel
- February 28: How to Spot a Red Flag, May Isang Pangarap (rerun) and Nang Ngumiti ang Langit (rerun) on Jeepney TV
- February 28: How to Spot a Red Flag on Kapamilya Channel
- March 1: From the Heart Specials: Ending Like a Flower (rerun) on Heart of Asia
- March 2: Ancient Love Poetry (rerun) and Rewriting Destiny on Heart of Asia
- March 2: Nathaniel (rerun) on Jeepney TV
- March 7: What's Wrong with Secretary Kim (rerun) on Heart of Asia
- March 7: The Untamed on Kapamilya Channel
- March 9: OPM sa DWIZ on DWIZ News TV
- March 9: Born for You (rerun) on Jeepney TV
- March 14: Tomorrow's Cantabile (rerun) on GTV
- March 14: Love Revolution on Heart of Asia
- March 14: All of Me (rerun) on Jeepney TV
- March 16: Buck on GTV
- March 16: From the Heart Specials: The Best Ending (rerun) and Legend of the Blue Sea (rerun) on Heart of Asia
- March 20: My Ilonggo Girl on GTV
- March 21: Dong Yi (rerun) and Show Window: The Queen's House (rerun) on Heart of Asia
- March 21: Mga Anghel na Walang Langit (rerun) on Jeepney TV
- March 21: Tropa Mo Ko Unli (rerun) on RPTV
- March 22: Ang Tinig N'yo and Wais Konsyumer on PRTV Prime Media and TeleRadyo Serbisyo
- March 22: Good Vibes on Jeepney TV
- March 23: My Shy Boss (rerun) on Heart of Asia
- March 23: Gretchen Ho Reports on One News
- March 23: Rainbow Rumble (season 1) on Kapamilya Channel
- March 28: Morning Chill on DWAN TV
- March 28: Arangkada Balita (3rd incarnation) on DWIZ News TV
- March 28: Lutong Bahay (3rd incarnation) on GTV
- March 28: Kung Fu Kids (rerun) on Jeepney TV
- March 29: My Love from the Star (2013) on GTV
- March 30: Where’s Chicky? on GTV
- March 30: Art of the Spirit (rerun) on Heart of Asia
- April 4: Playful Kiss (rerun) and The Penthouse (season 1; rerun) on Heart of Asia
- April 4: Kahit Konting Pagtingin and Mirabella (rerun) on Jeepney TV
- April 5: Palos on Cine Mo!
- April 5: MedTalk Health Talk (rerun) on RPTV
- April 11: The Love Trap on Heart of Asia
- April 11: Kambal sa Uma (rerun) and Ligaw na Bulaklak on Jeepney TV
- April 12: Time to Dance on Kapamilya Channel and Myx
- April 12: Kwatro Kantos and Raz-tsada on PRTV Prime Media and TeleRadyo Serbisyo
- April 13: Miss the Dragon (rerun) and To Me, It's Simply You (rerun) on Heart of Asia
- April 16: Overthoughts on DWAN TV
- April 16: Goblin (rerun), Jumong (rerun), Now, We Are Breaking Up (rerun) and Queen Seondeok (rerun) on Heart of Asia
- April 16: Liar on Kapamilya Channel
- April 18: Starla (rerun) on Jeepney TV
- April 24: Wil To Win on RPTV
- April 25: Wil To Win on BuKo Channel, One PH and Sari-Sari Channel
- April 25: Kaya ni Mister, Kaya ni Misis on Cine Mo!
- April 25: Are We Alright? (rerun) on Heart of Asia
- May 2: Kandidato on Congress TV
- May 2: A Beautiful Affair (rerun) on Jeepney TV
- May 2: Lumuhod Ka Sa Lupa on Sari-Sari Channel
- May 3: From the Heart Specials: Ending Again (rerun) on Heart of Asia
- May 6: Batas et Al (2023 original version; rerun) on RPTV
- May 9: Fear Times (rerun) and Ghost Doctor on GTV
- May 9: Doctor Detective, Eve and Kokdu: Season of Deity on Heart of Asia
- May 9: Bagito (rerun) on Jeepney TV
- May 9: Meteor Garden (2001) on Kapamilya Channel
- May 9: Aplikante on One News and One PH
- May 9: Aplikante and Suntok sa Buwan on RPTV
- May 10: Cayetano in Action with Boy Abunda on GTV
- May 10: Ultraman Z on Heart of Asia
- May 10: Balwarte on One PH, RPTV and True TV
- May 11: Spy × Family on GTV
- May 11: Revenge Note (rerun) on Heart of Asia
- May 11: Balwarte on One News
- May 14: The Way Forward on RPTV
- May 16: Da Body en da Guard (rerun) on Cine Mo!
- May 16: My Roommate Is a Gumiho (rerun) on Heart of Asia
- May 16: Bukas na Lang Kita Mamahalin (rerun) on Jeepney TV
- May 16: Balitang Pambansa on Radyo Pilipinas 1 Television
- May 16: The Secret of Feriha (ETCerye) on SolarFlix
- May 17: Lobo on Cine Mo!
- May 18: Filipino at Heart on GTV
- May 18: God of Lost Fantasy (rerun) on Heart of Asia
- May 23: Calla Lily (rerun) and We Will Survive (rerun) on Jeepney TV
- May 24: Balita Antemano, Feel Kita, Iwas Sakit, Iwas Gastos, Kwatro Alas, Ligtas Dapat, Pasado Serbisyo, Safe Space, Serbisyong DSWD for Every Juan, Spot Report, Win Today and Yan Tayo on TeleRadyo Serbisyo
- May 25: Good Old Days and Sunny Bunnies on GTV
- May 25: Yumi's Cells on Heart of Asia
- May 25: Ikaw Lamang (rerun) on Jeepney TV
- May 25: Anong Ganap?, Aprub 'Yan!, Bongga Ka Jhai!, GBU: God Bless U, Headline Ngayon Weekend, K-Paps Playlist, Konek Ka D'yan, Panalong Diskarte, Private Talks, Rosary Hour, Story Outlook, Sunny Side Up, Travel ni Ahwel, TV Patrol Weekend and Wow Sikat on TeleRadyo Serbisyo
- May 28: Love Konek on TeleRadyo Serbisyo
- May 29: Kaserbisyo Balita, Kaserbisyo Special Coverage and TeleRadyo Serbisyo Balita on PRTV Prime Media
- May 29: Ako 'To Si Tyang Amy, ATM: Ano'ng Take Mo?, Balitapatan, Gising Pilipinas, Headline Ngayon, Headline sa Hapon, Isyu Spotted, Kabayan, Kaserbisyo Balita, Kaserbisyo Special Coverage, Nagseserbisyo Niña Corpuz, Panalangin sa Alas-Tres ng Hapon, Radyo 630 Balita, Remember Your Music, TeleRadyo Serbisyo Balita and TV Patrol on TeleRadyo Serbisyo
- May 30: Bai Ling Tan (rerun) on Heart of Asia
- May 30: Precious Hearts Romances Presents: Ang Lalaking Nagmahal Sa Akin on Jeepney TV
- May 30: Johnson, Ikwento Mo!, Klinika 630, Showbiz Sidelines and Tatak: Serbisyo on PRTV Prime Media and TeleRadyo Serbisyo
- May 30: Batas et Al (revived version) on RPTV
- May 31: Science Pinas on GTV
- May 31: My Forever Sunshine (rerun) on Heart of Asia
- May 31: Alla's Yummy Food, Awesome Eats, Bible Connection, Chords of Mercy, Chords of Mercy UNLTD., Church Update, Gospel of Salvation, Home Free Radio, Kalinga On-Air, May Plano ang Dios, Moments with God, Music of the Heart, Pag-ibig nga Naman, Pray-A-Thon, Prayer Power, Psalms, Verses & Inspirations, SciShow, SciShow Kids, SciShow Space, Surer Word, The Bible Project, The Living Word, The Lord's Day, The Traveler's Guide, The Truth, The Word Today, Tuklasin Natin and Worship Sessions on Life TV
- June 1: Headline Ngayon Weekend on DZMM TeleRadyo and PRTV Prime Media
- June 1: Jujutsu Kaisen (season 1), Pan Tau (rerun) and Tokyo Revengers (rerun) on GTV
- June 6: Beauty and the Guy and The Girl Who Sees Smells on Heart of Asia
- June 7: Apoy sa Langit on GTV
- June 8: Sa Likod ng Kontrobersiya on DZRH TV
- June 8: Her Bucket List (rerun) on Heart of Asia
- June 13: Lolong: Bayani ng Bayan, Slay and You Are My Heartbeat on GTV
- June 13: Kingmaker: The Change of Destiny (rerun) and Stealer: The Treasure Keeper on Heart of Asia
- June 13: Happiness on Kapamilya Channel
- June 14: About Time on GTV
- June 16: Regal Treasures on GTV
- June 20: Mga Batang Riles on GTV
- June 20: Room No. 9 (rerun) and The Deadly Affair on Heart of Asia
- June 20: D8TV News: Balitang Balita on D8TV
- June 20: Hawak Kamay (rerun) and Saving Grace: The Untold Story on Jeepney TV
- June 22: BTS: Bring the Soul Docu-Series on GTV
- June 22: The Skywatcher (rerun) on Heart of Asia
- June 22: Hiram (rerun) on Jeepney TV
- June 22: Pilipinas Got Talent (season 7) on Kapamilya Channel
- June 27: Beauty Boy (rerun) and Secret Affair on Heart of Asia
- June 27: DOLE At Your Service sa Bagong Pilipinas on Radyo Pilipinas 1 Television
- June 27: Goin' Bulilit (season 9) and Saving Grace: The Untold Story on Kapamilya Channel
- July 3: Still on GTV
- July 4: I Need of Romance 3 (rerun) on Heart of Asia
- July 4: And I Love You So (rerun) and Marina (rerun) on Jeepney TV
- July 4: Marina and Viral Scandal (rerun) on Kapamilya Channel
- July 4: Sa Totoo Lang on True TV
- July 5: Lastikman (rerun) on Jeepney TV
- July 6: Poong, the Joseon Psychiatrist (season 2; rerun) on Heart of Asia
- July 11: It's a Beautiful Day! on Bilyonaryo News Channel
- July 12: An Oriental Odyssey (rerun) on Heart of Asia
- July 13: The Endlings (rerun) on GTV
- July 13: When the Weather Is Fine (rerun) on Heart of Asia
- July 18: Curtain Call and The Penthouse (season 2; rerun) on Heart of Asia
- July 18: Incognito, La Vida Lena (rerun), Pieta (rerun) and Sarah the Teen Princess (rerun) on Jeepney TV
- July 18: Incognito on Kapamilya Channel
- July 19: Chinese by Blood, Global by Heart on Bilyonaryo News Channel
- July 20: Senior Citizens Forum on DWIZ News TV
- July 20: Parang Kayo Pero Hindi on Heart of Asia
- July 25: She and Her Perfect Husband and The Betrayal on Heart of Asia
- July 25: Angelito: Batang Ama (rerun) on Jeepney TV
- July 25: Meteor Garden II on Kapamilya Channel
- July 26: Jirisan on GTV
- July 26: The Leaves (rerun) on Heart of Asia
- July 26: Maalaala Mo Kaya (2nd incarnation; season 31) on Kapamilya Channel
- July 27: BTS: Break the Silence and Daimos (rerun) on GTV
- August 1: Bawat Gising May Blessing! on DWAN TV
- August 1: Luv Is: Caught in His Arms (rerun) and True Horror Stories on GTV
- August 1: Behind Your Smile (rerun) on Heart of Asia
- August 1: My Dear Heart (rerun) on Jeepney TV
- August 2: Huwag Kang Mangamba (rerun) on Kapamilya Channel
- August 2: Prangkahan Na on Radyo Pilipinas 1 Television
- August 2: Watcha Morning on RPTV
- August 3: Sing Galing! (2nd incarnation; season 3) on BuKo Channel and Sari-Sari Channel
- August 3: The Heavenly Idol on Heart of Asia
- August 3: Sunday Combo Panalo on RPTV
- August 4: Blockbuster Bida on RPTV
- August 8: Newsfeed at Noon on Bilyonaryo News Channel
- August 8: The Red Sleeve (rerun) on Heart of Asia
- August 8: Dolce Amore (rerun), Mundo Man ay Magunaw and The General's Daughter (rerun) on Jeepney TV
- August 9: Wanted: Ang Serye on One PH
- August 10: DreamWorks Dragons: Rescue Riders on GTV
- August 10: Bigayan Na with Boss Toyo!!, Iskovery Night, Island Living, Motivated 3x3 Basketball Tournament, Motivated Billard League and Pigeon Insiders on D8TV
- August 15: My Dear Donovan and Third Rail (rerun) on Heart of Asia
- August 16: Parallel World on Heart of Asia
- August 17: Masked Singer Pilipinas (season 3) on Sari-Sari Channel
- August 18: Myx Daily Top 10 on Myx
- August 22: Kamen Rider Zero-One and The Penthouse (season 3; rerun) on Heart of Asia
- August 22: Barangay Singko Panalo on RPTV
- August 23: Queen of the Ring on Heart of Asia
- August 24: Wow Sikat on DZMM TeleRadyo and PRTV Prime Media
- August 29: Yes, Yes Show! (rerun) on Cine Mo!
- August 29: Flames of Vengeance on Heart of Asia
- August 29: Honesto (rerun) on Jeepney TV
- August 29: MedTalk Health Talk (rerun) on RPTV
- August 30: Expertalk (season 5) on GTV
- August 31: Tomorrow's Cantabile (rerun) on Heart of Asia
- September 4: Mike Abe Live on Radyo Pilipinas 1 Television
- September 5: The Wolf (rerun) on Heart of Asia
- September 6: Emojination (season 5) on BuKo Channel
- September 6: Perfect Marriage Revenge on Heart of Asia
- September 7: Nabi, My Stepdarling (rerun) and The Maid (rerun) on Heart of Asia
- September 12: Romantic Deception on GTV
- September 12: Bride of the Water God (rerun), Game of Outlaws (rerun) and The Last Promise on Heart of Asia
- September 12: Precious Hearts Romances Presents: Pintada (rerun) on Jeepney TV
- September 12: Recipe of Love (ETCerye) on SolarFlix
- September 13: Hogu's Love (rerun) on GTV
- September 13: Bilyonaryo Quiz B (season 1) on Bilyonaryo News Channel
- September 14: Mangarap Ka on Jeepney TV
- September 19: Luv Is: Love at First Read on GTV
- September 19: Love at First Night, Put Your Head on My Shoulder and Shooting Stars (rerun) on Heart of Asia
- September 20: The Girl He Never Noticed on Heart of Asia
- September 21: The Chosen on GTV
- September 21: Moon Embracing the Sun (rerun) on Heart of Asia
- September 26: Tokyo Revengers on Heart of Asia
- September 26: Ina, Kapatid, Anak (rerun) on Jeepney TV
- September 27: Dr. Tang (rerun) on Heart of Asia
- September 27: Gabi ng Bading on DZRH TV
- September 28: Idol Kids Philippines on Kapamilya Channel
- October 2: Beauty Empire on GTV
- October 3: Doors (rerun) on GTV
- October 3: When the Sky Falls on Heart of Asia
- October 3: Precious Hearts Romances Presents: Bud Brothers (rerun) on Jeepney TV
- October 3: Unchained Love on Kapamilya Channel
- October 5: John en Ellen and Ride PH on RPTV
- October 10: My Super D (rerun) on Jeepney TV
- October 13: Budol Alert on RPTV
- October 17: Love Revolution (rerun) on Heart of Asia
- October 17: It's Okay to Not Be Okay (Philippine adaptation) and Ningning (rerun) on Jeepney TV
- October 17: It's Okay to Not Be Okay (Philippine adaptation) on Kapamilya Channel
- October 18: Dino Dan (rerun) and From the Heart Specials: Pumpkin Time (rerun) on Heart of Asia
- October 18: Gus Abelgas Forensics (seasons 4 and 5) on One PH
- October 19: I Heart PH (season 10), The New Legends of Monkey (rerun) and The Boobay and Tekla Show on GTV
- October 22: ReFOODlika Na Sa Pilipinas on DWAN TV
- October 24: Jinxed at First (rerun) on Heart of Asia
- October 24: Gen H: Generation Healthy on Knowledge Channel
- October 25: One Night Steal (rerun) on Heart of Asia
- October 31: Agency, Endless Love (2019) and Me Always You (rerun) on Heart of Asia
- November 2: Hiwaga ng Kambat (rerun) on Jeepney TV
- November 7: E.P.A.L. Eto Pala Ang Latest! and Tanghali Na Lang Ang Tapat! on DWAN TV
- November 7: My Love from the Star (2013; rerun) on Heart of Asia
- November 9: Superhero Academy on GTV
- November 14: Bad Romeo on GTV
- November 14: Red Balloon and The Long Ballad (rerun) on Heart of Asia
- November 14: Aryana (rerun), Kokey at Ako (rerun), Noah (rerun), Reputasyon and The Greatest Love (rerun) on Jeepney TV
- November 15: Tayong Dalawa (rerun) on Cine Mo!
- November 16: Bai Ling Tan (rerun), Eve (rerun) and Mint To Be (rerun) on Heart of Asia
- November 21: Ancient Love Poetry (rerun) on Heart of Asia
- November 21: Galema: Anak ni Zuma (rerun), Katorse (rerun) and Sins of the Father on Jeepney TV
- November 21: Sins of the Father on Kapamilya Channel
- November 27: Yo-kai Watch! on Heart of Asia
- November 28: BaliTambayan on DWIZ News TV
- November 28: Rewriting Destiny on Heart of Asia
- November 29: Linlang: The Teleserye Version (rerun) on Kapamilya Channel
- November 30: Jirisan (rerun) on Heart of Asia
- December 5: My Name is Busaba (rerun) on Heart of Asia
- December 5: Hiram na Mukha (rerun) on Jeepney TV
- December 5: Pamilya Sagrado (rerun) on Kapamilya Channel
- December 7: Kiss Goblin on Heart of Asia
- December 7: Ang Munting Paraiso (rerun) on Jeepney TV
- December 7: Think About It on RPTV
- December 12: Witch's Love (rerun) on Heart of Asia
- December 12: Beautiful Day on Bilyonaryo News Channel
- December 13: Weather HQ on Bilyonaryo News Channel
- December 13: Siyensikat (season 6) on GTV
- December 14: The Better Half (rerun) on Jeepney TV
- December 17: DOTR Sakay NA on Radyo Pilipinas 1 Television
- December 19: Hearts on Ice (rerun) on GTV
- December 19: Miss the Dragon (rerun) and Secret Affair (rerun) on Heart of Asia
- December 19: Little Champ (rerun), Maging Sino Ka Man (2006; rerun) and The Legal Wife (rerun) on Jeepney TV
- December 20: Business Matters (season 12) and Princess Hours (2006) on GTV
- December 20: Art of the Spirit (rerun) on Heart of Asia
- December 26: The B Side (season 2) on Cinema One
- December 26: Blacklist (rerun) and Snow Eagle Lord on Heart of Asia
- December 26: The Promise of Forever (rerun) on Jeepney TV
- December 27: Aksyon DOLE sa DZMM on DZMM TeleRadyo and PRTV Prime Media
- December 27: Doctor Detective (rerun) on Heart of Asia
- December 28: Jujutsu Kaisen (season 1; rerun), Kung Fu Panda: The Paws of Destiny and Trolls: TrollsTopia on GTV
- December 28: Poong, the Joseon Psychiatrist (season 1; rerun) on Heart of Asia

==== Unknown dates ====
- Back to Classics, OPM Rewind and The Pop Phenomenon: K-pop and P-pop on DWAN TV

==== Stopped airing ====
Program	Channel	Last airing	Resumed airing	Reason
Isyu Spotted	PRTV Prime Media	January 3	September 7, 2026	Program was temporarily replaced by Arangkada Balita.
Sunday Combo Panalo	RPTV	January 26	May 4	Program replaced by the reruns of Barangay Singko Panalo.
Blockbuster Bida	RPTV	January 31	March 24	Programming break.
Frontline Pilipinas Weekend	RPTV	February 2	February 15	Pre-empted by Stories of Tomorrow.
Kapamilya, Deal or No Deal (seasons 4 and 5)	Kapamilya Channel	March 7	July 28	Program was temporarily replaced by the reruns of Meteor Garden (2001) and Meteor Garden II as the host of the show ran as a candidate for a local position in the 2025 elections.
Kapamilya Gold Hits	Kapamilya Channel	March 7	June 30	Programming break.
Agenda Weekend	Bilyonaryo News Channel	March 9	May 17	Programming break.
Agenda Weekend	Bilyonaryo News Channel	June 8	July 5	Programming break.
Dateline Philippines	ANC	March 10	March 12	Pre-empted by News Patrol: Special Coverage.
Top Story	ANC	March 10	March 12	Pre-empted by TV Patrol Express: Special Coverage.
Suntok sa Buwan	RPTV	April 11	April 21	Series break.
Sine Date Weekends	GTV	April 20	June 15	Pre-empted by the 100th season of National Collegiate Athletic Association.
The Situation Report	DZRH TV	May 23	September 7, 2026	Programming changes.
Wansapanataym (rerun)	Jeepney TV	August 24	November 8	Program replaced by the reruns of Hiwaga ng Kambat.
Aprub Yan!	DZMM TeleRadyo / PRTV Prime Media	September 14	September 28	Pre-empted by Kilos Kontra Korapsyon: DZMM Special Coverage.
Panalong Diskarte	DZMM TeleRadyo / PRTV Prime Media	September 14	September 28	Pre-empted by Kilos Kontra Korapsyon: DZMM Special Coverage.
Iwas Sakit, Iwas Gastos	DZMM TeleRadyo / PRTV Prime Media	September 14	September 28	Pre-empted by Kilos Kontra Korapsyon: DZMM Special Coverage.
Bongga Ka Jhai!	DZMM TeleRadyo / PRTV Prime Media	September 14	September 28	Pre-empted by Kilos Kontra Korapsyon: DZMM Special Coverage.
Konek Ka Dyan	DZMM TeleRadyo / PRTV Prime Media	September 14	September 28	Pre-empted by Kilos Kontra Korapsyon: DZMM Special Coverage.
Travel ni Ahwel	DZMM TeleRadyo / PRTV Prime Media	September 14	September 28	Pre-empted by Kilos Kontra Korapsyon: DZMM Special Coverage.
GBU: God Bless U	DZMM TeleRadyo / PRTV Prime Media	September 14	September 28	Pre-empted by Kilos Kontra Korapsyon: DZMM Special Coverage.
Yashahime	GTV	September 14	December 27	Programming changes
Story Outlook	DZMM TeleRadyo / PRTV Prime Media	September 20	September 27	Pre-empted by Kilos Kontra Korapsyon: DZMM Special Coverage.
K-Paps Playlist	DZMM TeleRadyo / PRTV Prime Media	September 20	September 27	Pre-empted by Kilos Kontra Korapsyon: DZMM Special Coverage.
Yan Tayo	DZMM TeleRadyo / PRTV Prime Media	September 20	October 4	Pre-empted by Alerto sa Bagyong Opong: DZMM Special Coverage.
Spot Report	DZMM TeleRadyo / PRTV Prime Media	September 25	September 29	Pre-empted by Alerto sa Bagyong Opong: DZMM Special Coverage.
Alam Na Dis	DZMM TeleRadyo / PRTV Prime Media	September 25	September 29	Pre-empted by Alerto sa Bagyong Opong: DZMM Special Coverage.
Kwento Nights	DZMM TeleRadyo	September 25	September 29	Pre-empted by Alerto sa Bagyong Opong: DZMM Special Coverage.
Love Konek	DZMM TeleRadyo	September 25	September 29	Pre-empted by Alerto sa Bagyong Opong: DZMM Special Coverage.
Remember Your Music	DZMM TeleRadyo	September 25	September 30	Pre-empted by Alerto sa Bagyong Opong: DZMM Special Coverage.
Sine Date Weekends	GTV	September 28	November 30	Pre-empted by the 101st season of National Collegiate Athletic Association.
Top 5: Mga Kwentong Marc Logan	One PH	November 22	January 10, 2026	Programming break.
Aprub Yan!	DZMM TeleRadyo / PRTV Prime Media	November 2	November 16	Pre-empted by Alerto sa Super Bagyong Uwan: DZMM Special Coverage.
Panalong Diskarte	DZMM TeleRadyo / PRTV Prime Media	November 2	November 16	Pre-empted by Alerto sa Super Bagyong Uwan: DZMM Special Coverage.
Iwas Sakit, Iwas Gastos	DZMM TeleRadyo / PRTV Prime Media	November 2	November 16	Pre-empted by Alerto sa Super Bagyong Uwan: DZMM Special Coverage.
Bongga Ka Jhai!	DZMM TeleRadyo / PRTV Prime Media	November 2	November 16	Pre-empted by Alerto sa Super Bagyong Uwan: DZMM Special Coverage.
Konek Ka Dyan	DZMM TeleRadyo / PRTV Prime Media	November 2	November 16	Pre-empted by Alerto sa Super Bagyong Uwan: DZMM Special Coverage.
Travel ni Ahwel	DZMM TeleRadyo / PRTV Prime Media	November 2	November 16	Pre-empted by Alerto sa Super Bagyong Uwan: DZMM Special Coverage.
Story Outlook	DZMM TeleRadyo / PRTV Prime Media	November 8	November 15	Pre-empted by Alerto sa Super Bagyong Uwan: DZMM Special Coverage.
GBU: God Bless U	DZMM TeleRadyo / PRTV Prime Media	November 2	November 16	Pre-empted by Alerto sa Super Bagyong Uwan: DZMM Special Coverage.
K-Paps Playlist	DZMM TeleRadyo / PRTV Prime Media	November 8	November 15	Pre-empted by Alerto sa Super Bagyong Uwan: DZMM Special Coverage.
Aprub Yan!	DZMM TeleRadyo / PRTV Prime Media	November 23	December 7	Pre-empted by Nobyembre 30, Kilos Kontra Korapsyon: DZMM Special Coverage.
Panalong Diskarte	DZMM TeleRadyo / PRTV Prime Media	November 23	December 7	Pre-empted by Nobyembre 30, Kilos Kontra Korapsyon: DZMM Special Coverage.
Iwas Sakit, Iwas Gastos	DZMM TeleRadyo / PRTV Prime Media	November 23	December 7	Pre-empted by Nobyembre 30, Kilos Kontra Korapsyon: DZMM Special Coverage.
Bongga Ka Jhai!	DZMM TeleRadyo / PRTV Prime Media	November 23	December 7	Pre-empted by Nobyembre 30, Kilos Kontra Korapsyon: DZMM Special Coverage.
Konek Ka Dyan	DZMM TeleRadyo / PRTV Prime Media	November 23	December 7	Pre-empted by Nobyembre 30, Kilos Kontra Korapsyon: DZMM Special Coverage.
Travel ni Ahwel	DZMM TeleRadyo / PRTV Prime Media	November 23	December 7	Pre-empted by Nobyembre 30, Kilos Kontra Korapsyon: DZMM Special Coverage.
GBU: God Bless U	DZMM TeleRadyo / PRTV Prime Media	November 23	December 7	Pre-empted by Nobyembre 30, Kilos Kontra Korapsyon: DZMM Special Coverage.
Story Outlook	DZMM TeleRadyo / PRTV Prime Media	November 29	December 6	Pre-empted by Nobyembre 30, Kilos Kontra Korapsyon: DZMM Special Coverage.
K-Paps Playlist	DZMM TeleRadyo / PRTV Prime Media	November 29	December 6	Pre-empted by Nobyembre 30, Kilos Kontra Korapsyon: DZMM Special Coverage.
Mega Blockbusters	Kapamilya Channel	November 30	December 21	Pre-empted by Bini Chapter 3: Hanggang Dulo on December 7 and Part 2 of Love, Joy, Hope: The ABS-CBN Christmas Special 2025 on December 14.
Maalaala Mo Kaya: Hugot from the Vault	Kapamilya Channel	December 6	December 20	Pre-empted by Part 1 of Love, Joy, Hope: The ABS-CBN Christmas Special 2025 on December 13.
Tao Po!	Kapamilya Channel	December 6	December 20	Pre-empted by Part 1 of Love, Joy, Hope: The ABS-CBN Christmas Special 2025 on December 13.
Serbisyong DSWD for Every Juan	DZMM TeleRadyo / PRTV Prime Media	December 20	January 10, 2026	Programming break.
Ala-Una sa Balita	Congress TV / DWAN TV	December 23	December 29	Programming break.
Congress News	Congress TV / DWAN TV	December 23	December 29	Programming break.

=== Video streaming services ===
- January 9: Saving Grace on Amazon Prime Video
- January 14: Lavender Fields on Netflix
- January 15: Lavender Fields on iWantTFC (now iWant)
- February 11: Wow Mani on VMX
- February 17: How to Spot a Red Flag on Viu
- April 25: Ang Mutya ng Section E on Viva One
- April 26: Kuan on One (season 2) on iWantTFC and YouTube (ABS-CBN Entertainment)
- May 8: Slay on Viu
- July 15: Incognito on Netflix
- July 16: Incognito on iWant
- July 16: Bini Versus on YouTube (Bini)
- July 23: Maalaala Mo Kaya (2nd incarnation; season 31) on iWant
- July 25: Avenues of the Diamond on Viva One
- August 8: Love at First Spike on iWant
- August 28: Beauty Empire on Viu
- September 2: Kuan on One (season 3) on iWant and YouTube (ABS-CBN Entertainment)
- September 3: Sparks Camp (season 3) on YouTube (ABS-CBN Entertainment)
- September 16: Philippines' Most Shocking Stories (season 1) on YouTube (ABS-CBN News)
- September 20: Ghosting (season 1) on iWant
- September 26: Seducing Drake Palma on Viva One
- October 3: Tropang G.O.A.T. on iWant
- October 10: Bad Genius: The Series (Philippine adaptation) on Viva One
- October 14: It's Okay to Not Be Okay (Philippine adaptation) on Netflix
- October 15: It's Okay to Not Be Okay (Philippine adaptation) on iWant
- October 21: Possessed on YouTube (ABS-CBN News)
- November 2: Bini World Tour Stories on iWant
- December 14: Ghosting (season 2) on iWant
- December 19: The Alibi on Amazon Prime Video

== Networks ==
The following are a list of free-to-air and cable channels or networks launches and closures in 2025.

=== Launches ===
Date	Network	Type	Channel	Notes	Source
March 1	Blast Movies	FAST/linear channel	Blast TV (OTT); Samsung TV Plus (FAST); Sky Direct Channel 39 (Nationwide)		
April 1	Zee Sine (2nd incarnation)	FAST/linear channel	Samsung TV Plus (FAST)		
July 24	Real Blast	FAST/linear channel	Samsung TV Plus (FAST)		
August 13	Ani-One	FAST/linear channel	Samsung TV Plus (FAST)		
September 1	UFC TV	Free-to-air	Channel 31 (digital feed); Sky Direct Channel 51 (Nationwide); Blast TV (OTT); Samsung TV Plus (FAST)		
September 19	Aniplus (2nd incarnation)	FAST/linear channel	Samsung TV Plus (FAST)		
October 30	TapSilog	Cable and satellite	Cablelink Channel 33 (Metro Manila); Sky Direct Channel 35 (Nationwide)		
December 1	My Cignal	Cable and satellite	Cignal Channel 12 (Nationwide)		
December 29	Kapatid Channel	Cable and satellite	Cignal Channel 15 (SD) / Channel 256 (HD) (Nationwide); SatLite Channel 15 (Nationwide)		

=== Rebranded ===
The following is a list of television stations or cable channels that have made or will make noteworthy network rebrands in 2025.

Date	Rebranded from	Rebranded to	Type	Channel	Source
January 1	One Media Network (2nd incarnation)	Golden Nation Network (2nd incarnation)	Broadcasting network	Selected terrestrial stations G Sat Channel 1 (Nationwide); Sky Cable Channel 73 (Metro Manila)	
May 29	TeleRadyo Serbisyo	DZMM TeleRadyo (2nd incarnation)	Cable and satellite	Cablelink Channel 7 (Metro Manila); G Sat Channel 39 (Nationwide); Sky Cable Channel 26 (Metro Manila) / Channel 501 (Provincial)	
June 4	Abante TeleTabloid	Abante TV	Cable and satellite	Blast TV; Converge Channel 79 (Nationwide); Selected Smart TV brands Sky Cable Channel 85 (Metro Manila)	
August 17	Cartoon Network Philippines	Cartoon Network Asia (2nd incarnation)	Cable and satellite	Cignal Channel 74 (SD) / Channel 220 (HD) (Nationwide); SatLite Channel 82 (Nationwide); Sky Cable Channel 43 (SD) / Channel 178 (HD) (Metro Manila)	
December 8	Solar Learning (DepEd ALS)	DepEd TV (2nd incarnation)	Free-to-air	Channel 21 (digital feed)	

=== Closures ===
Date	Station	Type	Channel	Sign-on debut	Source
January 20	Pilipinas HD	Free-to-air	Channel 31 (digital feed)	June 12, 2016	
March 14	Voice of America	Cable and satellite	Cablelink Channel 89 (Nationwide); G Sat Channel 103 (Nationwide); Sky Cable Channel 150 (Metro Manila) / Channel 802 (Provincial)	January 26, 1992	
April 12	MPTV (Media Pilipinas TV)	Cable and satellite	Cignal Channel 98 (Nationwide); SatLite Channel 53 (Nationwide)	April 13, 2023	
June 1	Life TV	Free-to-air	Channel 31 (digital feed)	October 3, 2016	
December 31	MTV 90s	Cable and satellite	Cablelink Channel 42 (Metro Manila); Sky Cable Channel 71 (Metro Manila) / Channel 642 (Provincial)	September 1, 2022	
December 31	MTV Live	Cable and satellite	Cablelink Channel 353 (Metro Manila); Sky Cable Channel 190 (Metro Manila) / Channel 749 (Provincial)	September 15, 2008	

=== Stopped broadcasting ===
The following is a list of stations and channels or networks that have stopped broadcasting or (temporarily) off the air in 2025.

Station	Type	Channel	Last broadcasting	Resumed broadcasting	Reason	Source
Shop TV	Free-to-air	Channel 21 (digital feed)	December 25	March 9, 2026	Temporary off-the-air due to changes in broadcast operations.	

== Services ==
The following are a list of television operators or providers and streaming media platforms or services launches and closures in 2025.

=== Launches ===
Date	Provider	Type	Stream	Source
May 23	Paramount+	VOD OTT streaming media	Blast TV	
May 31	Cignal Super	OTT streaming media aggregator	—N/a	
May 31	Curiosity Stream	VOD OTT streaming media	Cignal Super	
May 31	Fuse+	VOD OTT streaming media	Cignal Super	
May 31	Hallmark+	VOD OTT streaming media	Cignal Super	
August 18	Solar WatchNow	Multicasting	YouTube (Solar WatchNow)	

=== Rebranded ===
The following is a list of streaming providers that have made or will make noteworthy service rebrands in 2025.

Date	Rebranded from	Rebranded to	Type	Stream	Source
July 9	iWantTFC	iWant (2nd incarnation)	VOD OTT streaming media platform	—N/a	
July 9	Max	HBO Max	VOD OTT streaming media platform	—N/a	
October 9	Star	Hulu	VOD OTT streaming media (content hub)	Disney+	

== Deaths ==
The following personalities who made their deaths in 2025:

January

- January 25 – Gloria Romero (b. 1933), actress

February

- February 3 – Norman Santos (b. 1972), dancer
- February 14 – Evelyn "Matutina" Bontogon-Guerrero (b. 1946), comedian
- February 27 – Romano Trinidad (b. 1996), rapper and FlipTop emcee

March

- March 15 – Delia Razon (b. 1931), actress
- March 16 – Gold Dagal, stand-up comedian

April

- April 3 – Julie Alipala (b. 1966), Mindanao-based journalist
- April 12 – Pilita Corrales (b. 1939), Filipino singer-songwriter and actress
- April 16 – Nora Aunor (b. 1953), Filipino actress, recording artist, and film producer
- April 22 – Hajji Alejandro (b. 1954), singer and actor
- April 27 – Jiggly Caliente (b. 1980), drag performer, singer and actress

May

- May 2 – Ricky Davao (b. 1961), actor and director
- May 27
  - Freddie Aguilar (b. 1953), folk musician and singer-songwriter
  - Red Sternberg (b. 1974), actor (T.G.I.S.)

June

- June 14 – Cocoy Laurel (b. 1953), actor
- June 23 – Ali Macalintal (b. 1986), journalist (RPN-DXDX)

July

- July 3 – Lolit Solis (b. 1947), talk show host, news writer and talent manager
- July 21 – Fritz Ynfante (b. 1940), actor and director
- July 25 – Bayani Casimiro Jr. (b. 1967), actor (Okay Ka, Fairy Ko!)
- July 31 – Trevor Magallanes (b. 1986), financial analyst and ex-husband of Rufa Mae Quinto

August

- August 5 – Mario Garcia (b. 1951), veteran broadcaster
- August 28 – Mike de Leon (b. 1947), film director (Sister Stella L., Itim, Batch '81)

September

- September 15
  - Andy Verde (b. 1954), broadcaster (DZRH)
  - Ding Ruedas (b. 1958), journalist (DZRH)
- September 23 - Andre Tiangco (b. 1970), actor (Wansapanataym)

October

- October 19 - Lollie Mara (b. 1939), actress
- October 21 - Davey Langit (b. 1986), singer-songwriter, musician and radio DJ
- October 22 – Emman Atienza (b. 2006), actress and social media personality
- October 24 – Anna Feliciano (b. 1959), choreographer

November

- November 1 – Dondon Nakar (b. 1959), actor
- November 15 – Rosa Rosal (b. 1928), actress and humanitarian

December

- December 4 – Budoy Marabiles (b. 1971), musician and host (Pinoy Big Brother: Celebrity Edition 1)
- December 12 – Benjie Liwanag (b. 1964), radio anchor and reporter
- December 16 – Jefferson Utanes (b. 1979), voice actor and announcer
- December 21 – Bing Davao (b. 1960), actor and brother of Ricky Davao
- December 24 – Kuhol (b. 1959), actor and comedian
- December 27 – Jimmy Regino (b. 1969), band member, April Boys Group

== See also ==
- 2025 in television
