= 2023 in Philippine television =

The following is a list of events affecting Philippine television in 2023. Events listed include television show debuts, finales, cancellations, and channel launches, closures and rebrandings, as well as information about controversies and carriage disputes.

== Events ==
=== January ===
- January 1
  - After nine years and three months of broadcasting in the Philippines, BabyFirst has ceased its broadcast operations across Southeast Asia by First Media (under the Philippine channel distribution by Cable Boss) due to permanent discontinuation of its telecast by the content provider.
  - After five years and eight months of e-sports and gaming broadcast coverage, Cignal TV and Solar Entertainment Corporation (for its pay TV channel distribution since 2020) ceased its broadcast operations of eGG Network in the Philippines as the contract with MEASAT Satellite Systems (under the joint venture of Rocketfuel Entertainment Sdn Bhd.) has terminated on that date due to the closure of the said network in the region that follows the review of the management's decision through changes in business direction.
  - Sky Cable terminated Fight Sports on its line-up for the second time due to the expiration of Sky's contract with the network since April 1, 2021. Meanwhile, the network continued to air via Cignal.
  - Cignal terminated two channels: beIN Sports 1 and beIN Sports 3 on its line-up due to the expiration of Cignal's contract with the said networks. Meanwhile, beIN Sports 1 and beIN Sports 3 continued to air on Sky Cable and G Sat until they ceased operations on April 1, 2024.
- January 5 - Sonshine Media Network International migrated its broadcast signal reception to digital terrestrial transmission from switching off its analog frequency in nationwide areas after 17 years.
- January 12 - GMA Network and Viu sealed a five-year deal to air of selected GMA's primetime programs on the latter's streaming service.
- January 16 - GMA Network launched its Pinoy throwback subchannel on digital terrestrial television, Pinoy Hits.
- January 23 - ABS-CBN Corporation and GMA Network announced a historic deal for the co-production of the upcoming teleserye, Unbreak My Heart.
- January 29 - Viva Entertainment launched a secondary over-the-top content platform, Viva Prime, and began its soft operations which include movies and TV series content from the Viva library. It rebranded as Viva One on February 25.
- January 30 - During the ongoing soft launch since May 9, 2022, Aliw Broadcasting Corporation's IZTV rebranded as Aliw 23.
- January 31 - Robert P. Galang, who had been leading Cignal TV and TV5 since 2020 officially retired as president and CEO of TV5 Network and is succeeded by Guido R. Zaballero effective February 1. Jane J. Basas assumed the role of president and CEO of Cignal TV while also serving as the president and CEO of MediaQuest Holdings, the holding company of TV5 and Cignal TV.

=== February ===
- February 1 – G Sat terminated IBC, Outdoor Channel and SMNI on its line-up due to the revamping of the provider's channel space assignments. Meanwhile, Outdoor Channel continued to air via Cignal, SatLite, Sky Cable and Cablelink, IBC 13 continued to air via free TV Channel 13 on Analog and Channel 17 on Digital in Metro Manila, Cignal, SatLite, Sky Cable and Cablelink and SMNI continued to air via Channel 39 (digital) in Metro Manila, Cignal and Sky Cable. In addition, G Sat launched All TV, Cinema One and SolarFlix on their line-up.
- February 4 - Carren Eistrup was hailed as first grand winner of Eat Bulaga!'s "Bida Next".
- February 12 - Jeromy Melendez Batac, Marcus Rayden Cabais, Kenji "Kyler" Chua, Gabriel "Vinci" Malizon, Reyster Yton, Kim Huat Ng, and Winston Pineda were hailed of the top seven aspirants will make their debut in South Korea as members of the boy group HORI7ON, following the finale of the survival show Dream Maker.
- February 13 - Worship, Word & Wonders celebrated its 5th anniversary on Philippine television.
- February 14 - A day after its debut, the production unit team of ABS-CBN's primetime series, FPJ's Batang Quiapo has apologized to the Muslim community due to a scene where Coco Martin's character Tanggol sought the help of his Muslim friend Abdul–portrayed by Rez Cortez as he was being pursued by the police. Tanggol took refuge in the company of armed Muslim men whom the police were hesitant to take action due to fear of retribution. Muslim Filipinos took offense and criticised the portrayal as reinforcing negative stereotypes against them, with some calling for a boycott of the series. MTRCB chairperson, Lala Sotto-Antonio later released a statement on the said controversy. Senator Robin Padilla, a Muslim, gave a statement regarding the controversial episode.
- February 16 - GMA Network's secondary international channel GMA Life TV celebrated its 15th anniversary on global television.
- February 18 - Mary Delle Cascabel was hailed as first grand winner of It's Showtime's "Girl On Fire".
- February 19 - Swara Sug Media Corporation (a broadcast arm of the Kingdom of Jesus Christ that operates Sonshine Media Network International led by their church leader and televangelist pastor Apollo Quiboloy) has officially signed on via digital terrestrial television frequency on Channel 43 during the first Global Thanksgiving and Worship presentation at the Ynares Center in Antipolo, Rizal. The network covered in Metro Manila and nearby provinces. Channel 43 will be used as the main channel of SMNI News Channel on DTT, while retaining the use of SMNI on Channel 39 as a secondary channel after transitioning from analog to digital signal. The frequency was formerly used by AMCARA Broadcasting Network under blocktime agreement with ABS-CBN Corporation to air its digital channels on ABS-CBN TV Plus.
- February 21 - Social media personality Toni Fowler and Freshbreed's "M.P.L." did not receive a Strong Parental Guidance (SPG) rating from the Movie and Television Review and Classification Board contradictory to one of its cast's claim that the agency granted the said rating to the controversial music video. In after the MTRCB received a number of complaints regarding the clip's explicit content over the weekend and it has released a statement on the said controversy.
- February 27 - GMA Network, alongside its sister channel, GTV (owned by Citynet Network Marketing and Productions Inc., a wholly owned subsidiary of GMA Network Inc.), as well as four free-to-air GMA Affordabox digital subchannels (Heart of Asia Channel, Hallypop (until September 20, 2024), I Heart Movies and Pinoy Hits (until September 20, 2024) and three pay TV international channels (GMA Pinoy TV and GMA Life TV and GMA News TV International) have switched its airing of aspect ratio format quality on the channel feed and its programming to widescreen format (16:9) as being converted its mitigation of reception through analog and digital signal reception through free TV and other cable and satellite providers after more than 61 years (for GMA) and after almost 28 years (for GTV) on the usage of broadcast video picture resolution that migrated from fullscreen format (4:3).

=== March ===
- March 4 - Althea Ruedas of Antipolo, Rizal was hailed as first grand winner of Eat Bulaga!'s "Little Miss Diva".
- March 6 - Prayer Line celebrated its 5th anniversary on Philippine television.
- March 7 - Kapuso Mo, Jessica Soho issued an official statement on their Facebook account clarifying the recent K-Pop photo card snatching while on public transportation. Two days after the airing of its episode featuring a girl who reportedly stole over ₱2 million from her family to fund her K-pop merchandise collection. According to the official statement, the KMJS team condemns the trolling and harassment of netizens to their staff to make a statement regarding the story of 'Bea' during one of their recent episodes. Furthermore, the KMJS team clarified that the 'Bea' episode is not intended to demean anyone, but rather to serve as a lesson and warning to the community.

=== April ===
- April 1 - MediaQuest Holdings, through TV5 Network, Inc. launched TV5 in high-definition feed on Cignal TV. On April 16, the main channel has switched its airing of aspect ratio format quality on the channel feed and its programming to widescreen format (16:9) as being converted its mitigation of reception through analog and digital signal reception through free TV and other cable and satellite providers after almost 61 years since its original establishment and after more than 31 years since its re-establishment on the usage of broadcast video picture resolution that migrated from fullscreen format (4:3).
- April 3 - After 31 years in the Philippines, BBC World News rebranded as BBC News across the globe.
- April 13 - Cignal launched Media Pilipinas TV (MPTV) on their channel line-up.
- April 14 - The Benilde Lady Blazers clinched the NCAA Season 98 women's volleyball championship title after defeating the LPU Lady Pirates 2–0 in a best-of-three-game series at the Filoil EcoOil Centre in San Juan, Metro Manila. This was their second consecutive title.
- April 16 - The Perpetual Altas clinched the NCAA Season 98 men's volleyball championship title after defeating the San Beda Red Spikers 3–0 in winner take-all game 3 of the best-of-three finals series held at FilOil Ecooil Centre in San Juan, Metro Manila. This was their third consecutive title.
- April 22 - Maximum Groovers of Taytay, Rizal emerged as Eat Bulaga!'s Sayaw Bulaga 2023 Dabarkids Edition grand champion.
- April 23 - Usapang Pamilya celebrated its 5th anniversary on Philippine television.
- April 27 - After a year and 6 months, Discovery+ has ceased its over-the-top streaming service by Warner Bros. Discovery Asia-Pacific in the Philippines as it focused its efforts to HBO Go and the eventual rebranding of the service as Max on November 19, 2024.
- April 28 - ABS-CBN Corporation and TV5 Network announced a historic deal for the co-production of the upcoming daytime teleseryes, which officially revived its afternoon programming on July 25 with the premiered of Pira-Pirasong Paraiso and Nag-aapoy na Damdamin.
- April 30 - The Arellano Chiefsquad clinched the NCAA Season 98 cheerleading competition championship title held at the Rizal Memorial Coliseum. This was their fourth consecutive title.

=== May ===
- May 1 - Sky Cable terminated two channels: Aniplus and K-Plus on its line-up due to the expiration of Sky's contract with the networks. Meanwhile, Aniplus continued to air via Cablelink (until June 1), Cignal and SatLite while K-Plus continued to air via Cablelink (until June 1) and Cignal.
- May 3 - Rajah Broadcasting Network celebrated its 30th anniversary of broadcasting.
- May 5–17 - The 2023 Southeast Asian Games took place in Phnom Penh, Cambodia. MediaQuest Holdings (Cignal TV) and their sister companies PLDT-Smart Communications awarded the local rights to the annual games which aired on One Sports, One Sports+, Cignal Play and Smart Livestream.
- May 6 - Lyka Estrella of General Santos City was hailed as Tawag ng Tanghalan Year 6 Grand Champion on It's Showtime.
- May 14
  - The NU Bulldogs clinched the UAAP Season 85 men's volleyball championship title after defeated the UST Golden Spikers 2–0 in the best-of-three game series at the SM Mall of Asia Arena in Bay City, Pasay. This was their third consecutive championship title, and also the team to have a perfect 16-0 record, just like Ateneo did a perfect record in 2017.
  - The DLSU Lady Spikers clinched the UAAP Season 85 women's volleyball championship title after defeated the NU Lady Bulldogs 2–0 in the best-of-three game series at the SM Mall of Asia Arena in Bay City, Pasay. This was their 12th women's volleyball championship title in 5 years since their last title in UAAP Season 80 in 2018.
- May 21 - Shane Bernabe of Santa Rosa, Laguna (coached by Bamboo Mañalac) proclaimed as the fifth season grand champion of The Voice Kids.
- May 27 - TV5 and Cignal TV extended their partnership to Philippine Basketball Association for delivering stronger PBA coverage which announced its new home on October 17.
- May 28 -
  - Rex Baculfo of Caloocan won the fifth season of The Clash.
  - One News celebrated its 5th anniversary of broadcasting on cable television.
  - Agenda with Cito Beltran, One News Now and The Chiefs celebrated its 5th anniversary on Philippine television.
- May 31 - GMA Network's Eat Bulaga! original hosts led by Tito Sotto, Vic Sotto, and Joey de Leon departed ways with TAPE Inc. that produced for nearly 44 years. Other hosts and some production members filed their resignation on the same day. As a result, the noontime show aired The Best of EB until June 3 when the live programming resumed on June 5. On June 7, MediaQuest Holdings announced that the iconic noontime trio and other hosts joined the MediaQuest Group. On June 20, MediaQuest Holdings acquired 51% equity in TVJ Productions, a media production company co-owned by Tito, Vic, and Joey, solidifying their partnership to produce media content for the various MediaQuest distribution channels and platforms. MediaQuest chairman, Manny V. Pangilinan, announced an investment agreement with TVJ, expressing anticipation for a productive and long-term partnership. After the collaboration, TV5 announced its new noontime program would air in the timeslot occupied by ABS-CBN's It's Showtime. TV5 offered the 4:30 p.m. to 6:30 p.m. time slot to ABS-CBN for It's Showtime which respectfully declined. ABS-CBN and TV5 separately announced that It's Showtime would end its simulcast on TV5 on June 30 as it moved to its new home, GTV on July 1 and later on GMA Network and All TV in 2024.

=== June ===
- June 1
  - Cablelink terminated two channels: Aniplus and K-Plus on its line-up due to the expiration of Cablelink's contract with the networks. Meanwhile, Aniplus continued to air via Cignal, SatLite and Tap Go while K-Plus continued to air via Cignal.
  - Cignal and SatLite replaced Rock Extreme with Rock Action on its line-up with channel reassignment under movie genre.
- June 5 - RJ DigiTV celebrated its 5th anniversary of broadcasting.
- June 9 - Agripreneur, the agricultural infotainment program produced by Team MMPI (known as Marnie Manicad Productions International), is celebrated on its 5th anniversary on Philippine television.
- June 23 - After its soft launch on May 9, 2022, Aliw Broadcasting Corporation's Aliw 23 made its official launch.
- June 27 - Pilipinas Live, a local and global sports broadcasting brand owned by Cignal, was launched as an OTT service in the Philippines.
- June 28 - ABS-CBN Corporation and PLDT's Beneficial Trust Fund (MediaQuest Holdings through TV5 Network, Inc. and Cignal TV) announced a five-year content agreement after 2 years and five months of partnership agreement to provided more programs for the weekday and weekend slots.
- June 29 - TeleRadyo temporarily stopped its broadcast on pay TV and satellite by Creative Programs, Inc. (a subsidiary of ABS-CBN Corporation) at 10:15 p.m. as announced on May 23 via its press release due to programming redundancies and its persistent financial losses following the denial of its legislative franchise on July 10, 2020, and DZMM Radyo Patrol 630 went off-air on May 5, 2020. On June 30, the channel rebranded as TeleRadyo Serbisyo coinciding with the launch of its AM radio station counterpart DWPM Radyo 630, owned by Philippine Collective Media Corporation and operated by Media Serbisyo Production Corporation, a joint venture between Prime Media Holdings and ABS-CBN under an airtime lease agreement.

=== July ===
- July 1
  - The Sidlak Bisdak duo of Marielle Montellano and JM Dela Cerna was hailed as Tawag ng Tanghalan Duets Grand Champion on It's Showtime.
  - Solar Entertainment Corporation launched two movie channels (through its partnership with Jungo TV): Cinemundo Pinoy and Toro TV.
- July 17 – My Puhunan: Kaya Mo! celebrated its 10th anniversary on Philippine television.
- July 18 – August 20 - The 2023 FIFA Women's World Cup took place in Australia and New Zealand. MediaQuest Holdings (Cignal TV) and their sister companies PLDT awarded the local rights to the games which aired on One Sports, One Sports+, Cignal Play and Pilipinas Live.
- July 28 - Cartoonito relaunched in Southeast Asia (including the Philippines), replacing the 2nd incarnation of Boomerang.
- July 31
  - Tap Go removed six channels: Discovery Science, DMAX, Kartoon Channel, Knowledge Channel and ZooMoo on its line-up.
  - The Movie and Television Review and Classification Board issued a Notice to Appear and Testify to the Producers of ABS-CBN's noontime variety program It's Showtime over complaints concerning scenes that portrayed alleged "indecent acts" by hosts Vice Ganda and Ion Perez during the variety show's Isip Bata segment that aired on July 25. On September 4, the MTRCB ruled to suspend the producers of ABS-CBN's noontime variety program from October 14 to 27. As the result, the board added the cases regarding on two additional warnings over the utterance of profanity on January 24 and June 3 episode by two of its main hosts, Vhong Navarro and Jhong Hilario. Along with the additional complaints regarding to prior multiple warnings with in relation over the utterance of inappropriate word on outfit clothing on January 9 episode and the indecent attire and performance of Kim Duenas in Girl on Fire segment on February 14 episode. However, the show continued to air as their network files a motion for reconsideration. On September 28, the MTRCB denied the motion for reconsideration filed by ABS-CBN Corporation and GMA Network, Inc., allowing the networks to appeal to the Office of the President within 15 days. On October 6, both media networks decided not to appeal to the Office of the President the program's suspension.

=== August ===
- August 1 – Pinoy Box Office celebrated its 20th anniversary of broadcasting on cable television since the channel's establishment in 2003.
- August 5 – Jero Bagaporo from Gasan, Marinduque was hailed as the "Vortas 5" grand winner and won a total cash prize worth ₱100,000 on E.A.T.
- August 7 – Golden Nation Network reverted to One Media Network, along with its stations in Pampanga and Naga.
- August 8 – TAP Digital Media Ventures Corporation formally launched a FAST-oriented streaming service, BlastTV that featured its genre-based linear channels and video on-demand content. The service is available to Converge ICT subscribers. On November 3, The Tap Go app has rebranded under the same name.
- August 11 – The Movie and Television Review and Classification Board issued a Notice to Appear and Testify to the Producers of TVJ Productions' noontime variety program E.A.T. over the utterance of profanity by one of its main hosts, Wally Bayola during the variety show's Sugod Bahay, Mga Kapatid! segment that aired on August 10.
- August 16 – Pinoy Box Office temporarily went off-the-air due to technical audio difficulties.
- August 21 – Diyos at Bayan celebrated its 25th anniversary on Philippine television.
- August 25 – September 10 - The 2023 FIBA Basketball World Cup take place in Indonesia, Japan and Philippines. The Government of the Philippines (Presidential Communications Office), MediaQuest Holdings (Cignal TV and TV5 Network, Inc.) and their sister companies PLDT-Smart Communications awarded the local rights to the annual games which aired on PTV, TV5, One Sports, One Sports+, Cignal Play, Smart Livestream and Pilipinas Live. It also aired on pay-per-view through Cignal and SatLite.
- August 27 – GMA Network announced a franchise historic deal with The Voice of the Philippines to produce respective seasons and editions beginning with The Voice Generations on main channel along with their sister channel, GTV and Pinoy Hits. ABS-CBN Corporation continued to hold the rights of the said reality singing competition until the end of the third season of The Voice Teens on May 19, 2024.

=== September ===
- September 9 - After 23 years and a month of its broadcast programming run, Imbestigador aired its final episode as the original host, Mike Enriquez, died on August 29, making the longest-running investigative docudrama on Philippine television.
- September 12 - After 6 years and a month of broadcasting, Salaam TV ended its broadcast on Channel 14 by the Presidential Communications Office through People's Television Network. In addition, People's Television Network launched the TeleRadyo feed of Radyo Pilipinas 1 on the same digital subchannel assignment slot.
- September 18 - TAP DMV and Converge officially launched Studio Universal, a linear channel and video-on-demand hub on the streaming platform BlastTV.
- September 24 - Sky Cable terminated BBC News on its line-up due to the expiration of Sky's contract with the network. Meanwhile, the network continued to air via Cablelink and Cignal.
- September 30 - Marvin Peralta the Aerialist emerged as the first Ultimate Champion in Battle of the Judges.

=== October ===
- October 1
  - All pay television operators and providers in the Philippines have added or terminated a number of various channels and networks on their respective listing line-ups.
  - Five remaining Disney/Star linear channels in the Philippines (BabyTV, National Geographic Asia, Nat Geo Wild Asia, Star Chinese Movies and Star Chinese Channel) have ceased its operations by The Walt Disney Company (under Disney Branded Television, a unit of Disney General Entertainment Content and Fox Networks Group, a subsidiary of Disney International Operations) across Southeast Asia (including the Philippines), Hong Kong, South Korea and Taiwan, leaving the broadcast feeds from a few Asian territories as announced on June 13 and part of the company's continuing efforts focusing on its direct-to-consumer services through Disney+.
  - Cablelink terminated 12 channels owned by Mimyuni Media Entertainment: Chillayo, Cinemachi Action, Cinemachi Docu, Cinemachi Family, Cinemachi Xtra, Health & Wellness, Homey's, Lolly Kids, Luxe & Life, Pet & Pal, Planet Fun, Sportyfy, and Wow! on its line-up due to the termination of Cablelink's contract with unpaid carriage fees with the said companies and the review of the network's subscription performance. In addition, Cablelink launched 3 channels on their line-up: Premier Sports as well as two movie channels: TAP Action Flix and TAP Movies. The five TAP bundles (including TAP Edge, TAP TV, TAP Sports, Premier Football and Premier Sports 2) remained as part of the subscription plan and channel assignment replacement on the said channels.
  - Cignal launched BBC Lifestyle and HITS Now on their channel line-up. However, in the case of BBC Lifestyle, it can be found on selected cable providers.
  - G Sat relaunched Myx and SMNI on their channel line-up while Rock Action and SolarFlix moved on their channel space assignments.
- October 4 – Katkat Dasalla (Captivating Kakat) of Antipolo, Rizal proclaimed as the grand winner of the second season of Drag Race Philippines.
- October 16 – CLTV 36 migrated its broadcast signal reception to digital terrestrial transmission from switching off its analog frequency in nationwide areas after 16 years.
- October 17 – ABS-CBN Corporation, MediaQuest Holdings (Cignal TV and TV5 Network, Inc. with its sister company Smart Communications) and ZOE Broadcasting Network announced a deal with the Philippine Basketball Association, allowing the games to be broadcast on A2Z with the 48th season on November 5. According to TV5 President and CEO Guido Zaballero, the move made in an effort to have shift TV5 as entertainment and news channel. Apart from A2Z, viewers can watched the games on PBA Rush and Pilipinas Live. This is the first time that the Philippine professional basketball league to broadcast on A2Z since Maharlika Pilipinas Basketball League finished off the 2019–20 season through bubble setup in the Subic Bay Freeport Zone in 2021, 12 years after its broadcast on Studio 23 under PBA on Solar Sports block in 2011 and the return of full broadcast sports coverage after 3 years due to the shutdown of ABS-CBN broadcasting that led the dissolution of ABS-CBN Sports in 2020.
- October 21 – Chandria Rein Diaz of Tondo, Manila was hailed as Little Miss Philippines 2023 on Eat Bulaga!.
- October 27 – Allan Urbiztondo of Mabalacat, Pampanga was hailed as the "Stars of All Seasons" Grand Winner on It's Your Lucky Day.
- October 28 – Arianah Kelsey Lasam (b. January 23, 2019) of Pampanga was hailed as the grand winner of Mini Miss U on It's Showtime.
- October 29 – Philippine television aired the special programming of Halloween and All Saints' Day this year.
  - ABS-CBN News and Current Affairs aired the fifth edition of halloween special, Kababalaghan V: Pagkagat ng Dilim that anchored by Noli de Castro and it was broadcast simultaneously on cable TV via Kapamilya Channel, online via Kapamilya Online Live and iWantTFC, and on free-to-air via A2Z (where ABS-CBN aired the halloween special since 2011 and on KBYN: Kaagapay ng Bayan on October 30, 2022).
  - GMA Network, through its news magazine program, Kapuso Mo, Jessica Soho hosted by Jessica Soho aired the eleventh halloween special edition of Gabi ng Lagim XI and was broadcast simultaneously on its main channel and Pinoy Hits along with their sister channel, GTV and online via Kapuso Stream.

=== November ===
- November 1 - Cignal and SatLite launched TVN Movies Pinoy on their channel line-up. Meanwhile, TVN moved on their channel assignment in high definition slot.
- November 3 - Tap Go removed three channels: Aniplus Asia, MTV Live and TeleRadyo Serbisyo on its line-up due to rebranding of their streaming service, BlastTV.
- November 11 - Team Jhong, Kim and Ion was hailed as the 14th anniversary grand champion (Magpasikat 2023: 1-4 Ever!) on It's Showtime.

=== December ===
- December 2 – Fresno Style PH of Pangasinan was hailed as the first It's Showdown grand champion on It's Showtime.
- December 6 – The De La Salle Green Archers clinched their UAAP Season 86 men's basketball championship title after defeated the UP Fighting Maroons 2–1 in a winner-take-all game 3 of the best-of-three series. This was their 8th men's basketball championship title in 7 years since their last title in UAAP Season 79 in 2016.
- December 7 – CLTV 36 (owned by Radioworld Broadcasting Corporation) fully migrated its broadcast signal reception to digital terrestrial transmission from switching off its analog frequency in nationwide areas after 16 years. The first migration from analog to digital held on October 16.
- December 10 – VocalMyx of Cagayan de Oro (coached by Stell) proclaimed as the first-ever The Voice Generations winner.
- December 17 – The San Beda Red Lions clinched their NCAA Season 99 men's basketball championship title after defeated the Mapúa Cardinals 2–1 in a winner-take-all game 3 of the best-of-three series. This was their 23rd men's basketball championship title in 5 years since their last title in NCAA Season 94 in 2018.
- December 18 – The Movie and Television Review and Classification Board issued a 14-day preventive suspension order against 2 Swara Sug Media Corporation (a broadcast arm of the Kingdom of Jesus Christ that operates Sonshine Media Network International led by their church leader and televangelist pastor Apollo Quiboloy) shows. Laban Kasama ang Bayan has suspended over the unverified report on House Speaker Martin Romualdez's alleged ₱1.8 billion travel funds and Gikan sa Masa, para sa Masa also suspended over alleged death threats and profane language by guests on 2 episodes. According to the agency said the suspension is meant to address concerns and ensure SMNI's compliance with broadcasting standards. On December 21, most of SMNI's channel 39 and 43, Sonshine Radio 1026 AM KHz in Mega Manila signed off the air at 11:45 p.m. without its announcement on respective programs due to the suspension for 30 days that was issued by the National Telecommunications Commission in response to a House of Representatives on their House Resolution that urged the suspension over alleged violations of its franchise's Terms and Conditions.
- December 23 – After eight years and eleven months, TV Shop Philippines ended its digital terrestrial broadcast at 5:00 p.m. via BEAM TV subchannel lineup.
- December 27 - After two years and three months, DepEd NCR Prime ended its digital terrestrial broadcast at 10:00 p.m. via Southern Broadcasting Network subchannel lineup and Sky Cable.
- December 31 – After a year and seven months, PIE Channel ended its digital terrestrial broadcast, cable and satellite at 11:00 p.m. by Kroma Entertainment as officially announced on November 24 that the channel would transition into a fully online platform beginning January 1, 2024.

== Debuts ==
=== Major networks ===
==== A2Z ====
The following are programs that debuted on A2Z:

- January 1: Shuffle: Honoring God Through Music
- January 23: Dirty Linen
- February 13: FPJ's Batang Quiapo
- February 14: The Great Show
- February 25: The Goodbye Girl and The Voice Kids (season 5)
- March 4: I Can See Your Voice (season 5)
- March 18: Beach Bros
- April 9: My Sunset Girl
- April 29: Misis Piggy
- May 20: Tara, G!
- May 22: How to Move On in 30 Days
- June 3: Everybody, Sing! (season 3)
- June 18: Tao Po!
- June 24: Team Yey! Vlogs (Kidz Weekend) and Teen Clash
- July 10: Hello, Heart and Saying Goodbye
- July 16: My Puhunan: Kaya Mo!
- July 25: Nag-aapoy na Damdamin and Pira-Pirasong Paraiso
- July 29: Drag You & Me
- July 31: The Forbidden Flower
- August 28: Senior High
- September 3: Tomorrow's World
- September 16: Story of My Life
- October 14: It's Your Lucky Day
- October 16: Can't Buy Me Love
- October 28: Bubu and the Little Owls and Dinoman

===== Re-runs =====
- January 2: A Soldier's Heart^{1}^{5}
- January 7: Almost Paradise (season 1), Masha and the Bear^{3} (Kidz Weekend) and Robocar Poli^{3} (Kidz Weekend)
- January 8: Remi, Nobody's Girl^{1} (Kidz Weekend)
- April 16: Wansapanataym^{1} (Kidz Weekend)
- May 1: The Tale of Nokdu^{1}
- July 1: Super Inggo^{1} (Kidz Weekend)
- July 17: Minute to Win It: Last Man Standing (seasons 1 and 2)^{1}
- August 26: Call Me Tita^{1}
- September 30: Hinahanap-hanap Kita^{5}
- October 2: The World of a Married Couple^{5}
- October 28: Mr. Bean^{1}^{4}^{6}^{7} (Kidz Weekend)
- October 30: Superbook (1981)^{1}^{2}^{3}^{8} (Kidz Toon Time)
- November 4: I Am U^{1}
- December 2: Click, Like, Share (season 1)

Notes
^ ^{a} Originally aired on ABS-CBN (now Kapamilya Channel)
^ ^{b} Originally aired on GMA
^ ^{c} Originally aired on Yey!
^ ^{d} Originally aired on Studio 23 (now Aliw 23)
^ ^{e} Originally aired on Kapamilya Channel
^ ^{f} Originally aired on ABC (now TV5)
^ ^{g} Originally aired on PTV
^ ^{h} Originally aired on ZOE TV (now Light TV)

==== GMA ====
The following are programs that debuted on GMA Network:

- January 2: You Are My Heartbeat
- January 8: Happy ToGetHer (season 3)
- January 16: Bad Romeo, Luv Is: Caught in His Arms and Underage
- January 22: The Clash (season 5)
- January 23: Fast Talk with Boy Abunda and Poong, the Joseon Psychiatrist (season 1)
- January 30: 46 Days
- February 4: Reporter's Notebook
- February 5: Cayetano in Action with Boy Abunda
- February 6: Pan Tau
- February 13: Detective Conan (season 9)
- February 18: Kamen Rider Zero-One
- February 20: Bai Ling Tan
- February 27: Mga Lihim ni Urduja
- March 6: AraBella and Love Revolution
- March 8: Her Bucket List
- March 11: Dino Dan
- March 13: Hearts on Ice and The Last Promise
- March 20: The Write One
- April 1: GMA Integrated News Bulletin
- April 17: Eve, Game of Outlaws and The Endlings
- April 30: Where's Chicky?
- May 7: Resibo: Walang Lusot ang May Atraso
- May 8: The Seed of Love and Voltes V: Legacy
- May 15: My Dear Donovan
- May 22: An Oriental Odyssey
- May 27: Open 24/7
- May 29: Unbreak My Heart
- June 4: Walang Matigas na Pulis sa Matinik na Misis (season 1)
- June 12: Luv Is: Love at First Read and Now, We Are Breaking Up
- June 19: Royal Blood
- June 26: Magandang Dilag
- July 3: Revenge Note
- July 15: Battle of the Judges and Jujutsu Kaisen (season 1)
- July 24: Beauty and the Guy
- July 30: The Key of David
- August 7: Still
- August 21: Jirisan and My Roommate Is a Gumiho
- August 27: The Voice Generations
- August 28: The Missing Husband
- September 4: The World of Fantasy
- September 10: Dino Dana
- September 11: Maging Sino Ka Man (2023) and My Name Is Busaba
- September 16: Healing Galing and Pinoy Crime Stories
- September 25: Love Before Sunrise
- October 1: Sparkle U
- October 16: Poong, the Joseon Psychiatrist (season 2)
- October 23: The Deadly Affair
- November 5: Home Base Plus (season 24)
- November 6: Black Rider
- November 13: Buck and Stolen Life
- November 18: Dear SV
- November 20: Lovers & Liars and She and Her Perfect Husband
- November 27: Queen of Masks

===== Re-runs =====
- January 2: Queen Seondeok^{5}
- January 8: Angry Birds Toons
- January 16: Ultraman Taiga
- March 11: Road Trip (3rd incarnation)
- April 16: Ultraman Z
- April 23: Daimos^{1}^{2}^{3}^{4}
- June 26: Bad Romeo
- July 10: Bleach (seasons 2 and 3)
- July 24: Bride of the Water God
- July 31: Wolfblood (season 1)
- September 16: Karelasyon
- September 25: Dong Yi
- December 11: Wolfblood (season 2)
- December 18: I Can See You (season 2)

Notes
^ ^{a} Originally aired on ABS-CBN (now Kapamilya Channel)
^ ^{b} Originally aired on RPN (now CNN Philippines)
^ ^{c} Originally aired on IBC
^ ^{d} Originally aired on PTV
^ ^{e} Originally aired on TeleAsia Filipino (now defunct)

==== TV5 ====
The following are programs that debuted on TV5:

- January 15: Healing Galing
- January 17: Oras ng Himala
- January 22: The Chiefs
- January 23: Dirty Linen
- February 6: Magandang Buhay
- February 13: FPJ's Batang Quiapo
- February 14: The Great Show
- February 25: The Voice Kids (season 5)
- March 11: I Can See Your Voice (season 5)
- March 18: Kurdapya and Team A (season 1)
- April 10: Maine Goals (season 3)
- April 29: Cine Cinco Hollywood Edition
- April 30: CCF Worship Service
- May 1: Face 2 Face (2nd Incarnation)
- May 14: Emojination, Jack and Jill sa Diamond Hills and The Rain In España
- June 3: Everybody, Sing! (season 3)
- June 11: Transformers: Cyberverse (season 1)
- June 19: Gud Morning Kapatid
- July 1: E.A.T.
- July 3: More Than Friends
- July 15: Team A (season 2)
- July 25: Minsan pa Nating Hagkan ang Nakaraan (2023), Nag-aapoy na Damdamin and Pira-Pirasong Paraiso
- July 29: Woman in Action
- July 30: At Your Home with Anthony and Maricel and TikTalks (season 2)
- July 31: The Forbidden Flower
- August 5: For The Love
- August 26: Wow Mali: Doble Tama
- August 28: Senior High
- September 11: Spingo
- October 14: Frontline Pilipinas Weekend
- October 16: Can't Buy Me Love
- October 22: Celebrity Family Feud
- October 28: Gus Abelgas Forensics (season 1)
- October 29: Britain's Got Talent (series 16)
- October 30: Gabby's Dollhouse
- November 20: Revolutionary Love
- December 2: Jurassic World Camp Cretaceous
- December 4: The Game

===== Re-runs =====
- January 14: John en Ellen (season 1) and Pinoy Explorer
- January 28: Samurai Jack^{5}
- January 30: Sa Ngalan ng Ina
- February 6: Codename: Kids Next Door^{5}, Dexter's Laboratory^{4}, Maine Goals (seasons 1 and 2)^{7} and The Powerpuff Girls (1998)^{2}
- March 13: True Beauty
- April 10: Bakit Manipis ang Ulap?
- May 1: My Little Pony: Friendship Is Magic^{2} and The Tale of Nokdu^{1}
- May 22: Misibis Bay
- June 10: My Hero Academia (seasons 1 and 2)^{1}^{3}
- June 19: For Love or Money and Star Confessions
- June 24: The Best of Wow Mali
- June 26: Trolls: The Beat Goes On!
- July 10: Dragons: Race to the Edge and Studio 5 Presents
- July 23: Wanted: Ang Serye
- July 25: Masked Singer Pilipinas season 1
- August 14: Rolling In It Philippines (season 2)
- September 4: Niña Niño
- October 2: The World of a Married Couple^{6}
- November 11: Demolition Job
- November 18: Brillante Mendoza Presents
- December 11: Celebrity Samurai

Notes
^ ^{a} Originally aired on ABS-CBN (now Kapamilya Channel)
^ ^{b} Originally aired on GMA
^ ^{c} Originally aired on Yey!
^ ^{d} Originally aired on Studio 23 (now Aliw 23)
^ ^{e} Originally aired on RPN (now CNN Philippines)
^ ^{f} Originally aired on Kapamilya Channel
^ ^{g} Originally aired on BuKo Channel

=== State-owned networks ===
==== PTV ====
The following are programs that debuted on People's Television Network:

- January 21: Saka-Inan
- February 13: Oras ng Himala
- June 10: Atmosphere of Miracles and NAPC: Aksyon Laban sa Kahirapan
- July 18: DOST Report
- July 24: Bagong Pilipinas, On The Ground and PBBM Vlog
- August 21: PTV Balita Ngayon sa Probinsya: Cordillera, PTV Balita Ngayon sa Probinsya: Cebu, PTV Balita Ngayon sa Probinsya: Mindanao, PTV News Now and Stories from the Grid: The VOA and AFP Diaries
- August 25: Global Round-up
- September 18: Bagong Pilipinas Ngayon and Punto Asintado Reload
- September 25: On Assignment
- October 22: Masters of the Game
- November 18: Abogado ng Bayan
- December 2: Asenso KaPinoy
- December 3: Entrepinas TV

==== IBC ====
The following are programs that debuted on IBC:

- January 7: NCCT Originals
- January 30: Bitag Live and IpaBITAG Mo
- March 16: EZ Shop
- March 18: TV Shop Philippines
- June 12: Talents Academy (season 12)
- June 15: Bagong Barangay ng Mamamayan in Action
- July 8: Talents Academy (season 13)
- July 22: Bagong Pilipinas
- July 24: On The Ground and PBBM Vlog
- August 28: Ito Ang Kongreso
- August 29: The Good Story
- September 3: Bagong Pilipinas, PBBM: Lingkod ng Bayan
- September 18: Bagong Pilipinas Ngayon
- November 26: Ang Alamat ng Silk Road: Ang Larawan ng Dagat
- December 9: Mga Babaeng Buhawi (Running Like Wind) and Pagtingin sa Huling Sampung Taon (Decoding the Past Ten Years)
- December 11: Cabinet @ Work
- December 16: Aerial Views of China: Xizang Edition and Pagtawid sa Gubat (Through the Rainforest)

=== Minor networks ===
The following are programs that debuted on minor networks:

- January 2: Woori the Virgin on All TV
- January 20: Blueprint on Net 25
- January 22: GoodWill (season 1) on Net 25
- January 23: Mysterious Personal Shopper on Net 25
- January 30: BaliTambayan, IZ Umaga Balita, Pasada Balita, Pinoy Gising!, Ronda Pilipinas and Tandem: David at Jon on Aliw 23
- January 30: Gikan sa Masa, Para sa Masa on SMNI
- February 1: Why Her on All TV
- February 2: Ziff O’Clock on Aliw 23
- February 4: IZ Balita Sabado on Aliw 23
- February 5: IZ Balita Linggo on Aliw 23
- February 13: Love and Everythaaang on Net 25
- February 20: Department of Help on Aliw 23
- March 4: Reality Check on Net 25
- March 6: Hot Mom and Miracle on All TV
- March 6: Praise, Inc. on Light TV
- March 6: Ang Tingog ni Nanay on Light TV
- March 6: Kızım on Net 25
- March 7: Bawat Tibok ng Puso on Light TV
- March 8: Billy Graham Classics and Billy Graham TV on Light TV
- March 9: Ticktalk on Light TV
- March 10: Our Hope on Light TV
- March 19: Negosyo Goals (season 1) on All TV
- March 20: If You Wish Upon Me on All TV
- March 20: Bitag Live and IpaBITAG Mo on CLTV-36
- March 21: Papa, Nasa'n Ka? on SMNI
- March 26: Drive Through History on Light TV
- April 1: Wisdom Church of Manila on Light TV
- April 10: AllFlix Pinoy Picks on All TV
- April 16: Great Lakes of the Philippines and INC News World on Net 25
- April 17: Eyespotted and News Scoop on Aliw 23
- April 22: Build PH: The Night Owl on SMNI
- April 23: Barangay Mirandas on Net 25
- May 4: Teaching the Bible on Light TV
- May 15: Botika ni Tita on Aliw 23
- May 21: GoodWill (season 2) on Net 25
- May 22: Kingdom Force on SMNI
- May 22: Sumbong N'yo, Aksyon Agad on UNTV
- June 4: Usapang Kids on Light TV
- June 6: NegoShow on Aliw 23
- June 6: Love Ko si Lord on Light TV
- June 7: Tara Lezz Go on Light TV
- June 25: IZ Game Time and NBL Pilipinas on Aliw 23
- June 26: Love, Tonipet and Everythaaang, Mata ng Agila sa Tanghali and Siyento Por Siyento on Net 25
- July 6: Living Word on Light TV
- July 8: A Journey with Joana Marie on Light TV
- July 10: Unwanted Family on Net 25
- July 15: Magandang Araw on Net 25
- July 18: Kasosyo TV on Light TV
- July 30: Negosyo Goals (season 2) on All TV
- August 2: Christian Cinema on Light TV
- August 3: Bagong Barangay ng Mamamayan in Action on Aliw 23
- August 5: Art Academy on Net 25
- August 6: GNPI Series, Magpuri TV and Why Israel Matters on Light TV
- August 12: AllFlix Prime on All TV
- August 14: Dahil Sa'yo on All TV
- August 20: UNTV Volleyball League on UNTV
- August 26: OFW Ikaw Ang Bida! on SMNI
- September 1: Great Day to Live and Living the Blessing on Light TV
- September 10: Bahay Pinoy, Buhay Pinoy (2nd incarnation) on Aliw 23
- September 11: Arangkada Balita (3rd incarnation) on Aliw 23
- September 11: My Bargain Queen on Net 25
- September 11: 3PM Luzon Visayas Mindanao: Pilipinas Muna on SMNI
- October 8: GoodWill (season 3) on Net 25
- October 23: Makitang Muli on SMNI
- October 29: Let’s Prove It!, NBI: Naku, Bawal Ito, Raket and Showbiz Spotted on Aliw 23
- November 27: House of Bluebird on Net 25
- December 18: Starkada on Net 25

==== Re-runs ====
- January 2: Till I Met You on All TV^{1}
- January 7: Oh My Dad! on All TV^{2}
- March 6: Sandugo on All TV^{1}
- April 17: Ngayon at Kailanman on All TV^{1}
- April 24: River Where the Moon Rises on All TV
- May 1: From Now On, Showtime! on All TV
- June 3: Oyayi on Light TV^{1}^{3}^{4}
- June 5: Woori the Virgin on All TV
- June 19: Again My Life on All TV
- July 15: John en Ellen on All TV^{2}
- July 17: If You Wish Upon Me and Precious Hearts Romances Presents: Araw Gabi^{1} on All TV
- August 5: Sino ang Maysala?: Mea Culpa on All TV^{1}
- August 7: Why Her? on All TV
- September 18: From Now On, Showtime! on All TV
- October 9: Asintado^{1} and River Where the Moon Rises on All TV
- October 23: Sana Dalawa ang Puso on All TV^{1}
- November 20: Again My Life, Till I Met You^{1} and Woori the Virgin on All TV
- December 18: Miracle on All TV
- Notes
1. ^ ^{a} Originally aired on ABS-CBN (now Kapamilya Channel)
2. ^ ^{b} Originally aired on TV5
3. ^ ^{c} Originally aired on A2Z
4. ^ ^{d} Originally aired on Knowledge Channel

=== Other channels ===
The following are programs that debuted on other channels:

- January 2: Mi pecado on Telenovela Channel
- January 7: Aksyon, Tulong, Solusyon on DZRH TV
- January 8: Room No. 9 on GTV
- January 8: Manny Pacquiao Presents: Blow By Blow on One Sports
- January 9: Flames of Vengeance on GTV
- January 9: Dream Maker: Pause and Play on PIE Channel
- January 16: Usapang Bilyonaryo on CNN Philippines
- January 16: Luv Is: Caught in His Arms on GTV
- January 16: 24 Oras, Abot-Kamay na Pangarap, Balitanghali, Dapat Alam Mo!, Luv Is: Caught in His Arms, Maria Clara at Ibarra, Regional TV News, Saksi, Saksi sa Dobol B, Unang Hirit, Underage and Unica Hija on Pinoy Hits
- January 20: Bubble Gang and i-Witness on Pinoy Hits
- January 21: 24 Oras Weekend, Brigada, Dobol Weng sa Dobol B, Good News Kasama si Vicky Morales, iJuander, Imbestigador, Pepito Manaloto: Tuloy ang Kwento, Pera Paraan, Pinoy M.D. sa Dobol B, Sarap, 'Di Ba?, Super Balita sa Umaga, Tadhana, Telesine Presents and Wish Ko Lang! on Pinoy Hits
- January 22: I Heart PH (season 7) on CNN Philippines
- January 22: Aha!, All Out Sundays, Born to Be Wild, Farm to Table, iBilib, Kapuso Mo, Jessica Soho, Pinas Sarap, Reporter's Notebook and The Boobay and Tekla Show on Pinoy Hits
- January 23: Dirty Linen on Jeepney TV and Kapamilya Channel
- January 23: PIEnalo (season 3) on PIE Channel
- January 23: Fast Talk with Boy Abunda on Pinoy Hits
- January 28: Sa'ng Daang PIEnalo on PIE Channel
- February 1: EZ Shop on Pinoy Hits
- February 4: Agri TV ATBP.: Kasama sa Hanapbuhay and Sabong TV on One Sports
- February 4: The Chosen One: Barkadahan on PIE Channel
- February 5: Daig Kayo ng Lola Ko, Kapuso Mo, Jessica Soho and The Boobay and Tekla Show on GTV
- February 5: PIE Shorts on PIE Channel
- February 11: Cayetano in Action with Boy Abunda on GTV
- February 11: Hallyflix and Romance of Dog and Monkey on Hallypop
- February 13: FPJ's Batang Quiapo on Cine Mo! and Kapamilya Channel
- February 13: Are We Alright? on GTV
- February 13: Radyo5 Balita Pilipinas on One PH
- February 13: Pak na Pak! Palong Follow on PIE Channel
- February 14: The Great Show on Kapamilya Channel
- February 18: Dear SV on CNN Philippines
- February 18: Papa ng Masa on PIE Channel
- February 19: Tomorrow's Cantabile on GTV
- February 20: General and I on Heart of Asia
- February 20: Kwentong Kalikasan on Knowledge Channel
- February 20: One News Now: Business, One News Now: Markets, One News Now: Sports and One News Now: World on One News
- February 20: In Between (ETCerye) on SolarFlix
- February 25: The Goodbye Girl and The Voice Kids (season 5) on Kapamilya Channel
- February 27: Mga Lihim ni Urduja on GTV and Pinoy Hits
- March 4: Kanya-Kanyang Problema on DZRH TV
- March 4: I Can See Your Voice (season 5) on Kapamilya Channel
- March 6: 24 Oras, Luv Is: Caught in His Arms and Mga Lihim ni Urduja on I Heart Movies
- March 6: AraBella on Pinoy Hits
- March 13: Hearts on Ice on GTV, I Heart Movies and Pinoy Hits
- March 18: Beach Bros on Kapamilya Channel
- March 19: Kurdapya and Team A (season 1) on Sari-Sari Channel
- March 20: Kingmaker: The Change of Destiny and The Write One on GTV
- March 20: The Write One on I Heart Movies and Pinoy Hits
- March 27: StarGaze Muzik on Hallypop
- April 1: GMA Integrated News Bulletin on GTV, I Heart Movies and Pinoy Hits
- April 1: From the Heart Specials: Girl Detective Park Hae-Sol and GMA Integrated News Bulletin on Heart of Asia
- April 1: Kapamilya Journeys of Hope on Kapamilya Channel
- April 9: My Sunset Girl on Kapamilya Channel
- April 10: Maine Goals (season 3) on BuKo Channel
- April 10: The SPG Show: Saktong Pang Gabi on PIE Channel
- April 16: Jungo Pinoy Presents on Hallypop
- April 22: Siyensikat (season 3) on CNN Philippines
- April 22: Over a Glass or Two on Jeepney TV
- April 24: The Love Trap on GTV
- April 29: Misis Piggy on Kapamilya Channel
- April 29: Mga Kuwento ng Dilim on PIE Channel
- April 30: Para sa All on PIE Channel
- May 1: Face 2 Face (2nd Incarnation) on One PH
- May 1: Kung Saka-Sakali, Matching Matching, Pak na Pak!, Shoutout TV and Ur Da Boss on PIE Channel
- May 1: Sortilegio on Telenovela Channel
- May 4: Batas et AL on CNN Philippines
- May 6: The Chosen One: Kakatacute (season 2) on PIE Channel
- May 7: 2023 Shakey's Girls Volleyball Invitational League on CNN Philippines and Solar Sports
- May 7: GMA Blockbusters, Regal Studio Presents and Resibo: Walang Lusot ang May Atraso on GTV
- May 8: Voltes V: Legacy on GTV and I Heart Movies
- May 8: The View From Manila on One News
- May 8: The Seed of Love and Voltes V: Legacy on Pinoy Hits
- May 9: Thought Leaders on One News
- May 10: Private Convos on One News
- May 11: Roundtable on One News
- May 12: The Men's Room on One News
- May 13: Blacklist on GTV
- May 13: Presello House Tours (season 2) on One News
- May 14: Emojination and Jack and Jill sa Diamond Hills on BuKo Channel
- May 20: From the Heart Specials: Youth on Heart of Asia
- May 20: Tara, G! on Kapamilya Channel
- May 22: Parang Kayo Pero Hindi on GTV
- May 22: How to Move On in 30 Days on Kapamilya Channel
- May 29: Unbreak My Heart on GTV, I Heart Movies and Pinoy Hits
- June 3: From the Heart Specials: Ending Like A Flower and From the Heart Specials: Middle School Student A on Heart of Asia
- June 3: Everybody, Sing! season 3 on Kapamilya Channel
- June 4: Chinese by Blood, Filipino by Heart (season 4) on CNN Philippines
- June 4: Happy ToGetHer (season 3) on Pinoy Hits
- June 5: In Need of Romance 3 on GTV
- June 5: Teresa on Telenovela Channel
- June 11: The Key of David on Pinoy Hits
- June 12: BalitaOnenan! (season 2) on BuKo Channel
- June 12: Mar de amor on Telenovela Channel
- June 17: The World is Yours (Kids Block) on CNN Philippines
- June 17: From the Heart Specials: Do I Look Like A Pushover on Heart of Asia
- June 18: Healing Galing on GTV
- June 18: Tao Po! on Kapamilya Channel and TeleRadyo
- June 19: Royal Blood on GTV, I Heart Movies and Pinoy Hits
- June 22: Tao Po! on ANC
- June 24: Team Yey! Vlogs on Jeepney TV
- June 24: Team Yey! Vlogs and Teen Clash on Kapamilya Channel
- June 26: Magandang Dilag on Pinoy Hits
- June 30: Knowledge Channel School Anywhere (weekday edition) on Kapamilya Channel
- June 30: Gising Pilipinas, Headline Ngayon, Kabayan, Pintig ng Bayan, Tatak: Serbisyo, TeleRadyo Serbisyo Balita and TV Patrol on TeleRadyo Serbisyo
- July 1: E.A.T. on BuKo Channel and One PH
- July 1: Matchpoint and Scene Zone on DZRH TV
- July 1: It's Showtime on GTV
- July 1: From the Heart Specials: Best Ending and From the Heart Specials: The Taste of Curry on Heart of Asia
- July 1: Anong Ganap?, Headlines of the Day, Iwas Sakit, Iwas Gastos, TV Patrol Weekend, Wais Konsyumer and Win Today on TeleRadyo Serbisyo
- July 2: Aprub 'Yan!, Panalong Diskarte and Wow Sikat on TeleRadyo Serbisyo
- July 3: Business Outlook, Business Roadshow and Global 3000 on ANC
- July 4: In Good Shapes on ANC
- July 5: Arts.21 on ANC
- July 6: Made in Germany on ANC
- July 7: Tomorrow Today on ANC
- July 8: Touching You on Hallypop
- July 9: The Final Pitch (season 9) on CNN Philippines
- July 9: Bubble Gang on GTV
- July 10: My Ambulance on Heart of Asia
- July 10: Hello, Heart and Saying Goodbye on Kapamilya Channel
- July 14: Doors on GTV
- July 14: Amazing Earth on Pinoy Hits
- July 15: Gus Abelgas Forensics on One PH
- July 15: Team A (season 2) on Sari-Sari Channel
- July 16: I Heart PH (season 8) on CNN Philippines
- July 16: My Puhunan: Kaya Mo! on Kapamilya Channel
- July 17: Hello Attorney, Isyu Spotted, Kasalo, Pasada, Share Ko Lang and TeleRadyo Serbisyo Rewind on TeleRadyo Serbisyo
- July 22: My Puhunan: Kaya Mo! on ANC
- July 22: Expertalk (season 2; Kids Block) on CNN Philippines
- July 22: From the Heart Specials: Ending Again on Heart of Asia
- July 24: TeleRadyo Serbisyo & Radyo 630 Special Coverage on TeleRadyo Serbisyo
- July 25: Nag-aapoy na Damdamin and Pira-Pirasong Paraiso on Kapamilya Channel
- July 25: Minsan pa Nating Hagkan ang Nakaraan (2023) on Sari-Sari Channel
- July 29: Ka-Vendor on DZRH TV
- July 29: Drag You & Me on Kapamilya Channel
- July 29: For the Love on Sari-Sari Channel
- July 30: TikTalks (season 2) on One News and One PH
- July 31: The Forbidden Flower on Kapamilya Channel
- July 31: TeleRadyo Serbisyo Newsbreak on TeleRadyo Serbisyo
- August 1: Oras ng Himala on Solar Sports and SolarFlix
- August 5: Lucky Home with Master Hanz Cua on Jeepney TV
- August 5: Ang Tinig Nyo, Feel Kita, K-Paps Playlist, Pasado Serbisyo and Spot Report on TeleRadyo Serbisyo
- August 6: GBU: God Bless U, Konek Ka Dyan, Story Outlook and Travel ni Ahwel on TeleRadyo Serbisyo
- August 12: Business Matters (season 10) on CNN Philippines
- August 12: Pinoy Paranormal Mysteries on Jeepney TV
- August 13: Kiddie Explorers on One PH
- August 20: Bongga Ka Jhai! on TeleRadyo Serbisyo
- August 21: Mukhang Perya on PIE Channel
- August 26: Wow Mali: Doble Tama on BuKo Channel
- August 27: The Voice Generations on GTV and I Heart Movies
- August 27: NegoSHEnte and The Voice Generations on Pinoy Hits
- August 28: Senior High on Jeepney TV and Kapamilya Channel
- August 28: The Missing Husband on Pinoy Hits
- September 2: Saturday Cinema Hits (2nd incarnation) on GTV
- September 4: Balita Ko on GTV, Heart of Asia, I Heart Movies and Pinoy Hits
- September 9: From the Heart Specials: Came to Me and Become a Star on Heart of Asia
- September 9: Pamilya Talk with Tita Jing on Jeepney TV
- September 9: Tamang Hinala on PIE Channel
- September 11: Maging Sino Ka Man (2023) on GTV, I Heart Movies and Pinoy Hits
- September 11: Bangon Bayan with Mon on One PH
- September 11: Abominable and the Invisible City and Watchawin on PIE Channel
- September 13: Siklo ng Enerhiya on Knowledge Channel
- September 13: Agenda ng Bayan, Bangon, Bayang Mahal!, Doctors on Board, Erwin Tulfo On Air with Niña Corpuz, Game On! Isyu Balita, Home EcoNanay, Mike Abe Live, Operation Lokal, Oras Para sa Musika, Otro Cinco, PBS News Now, Radyo Pilipinas News Nationwide (weekday edition), Ronda Pilipinas, Salaam Radio and Sports News Roundup on Radyo Pilipinas 1 Television
- September 14: Serbisyong Pilipinas on Radyo Pilipinas 1 Television
- September 15: PSC Hour and Tinig ng Kababaihan on Radyo Pilipinas 1 Television
- September 16: FPJ's Batang Quiapo: Marathon on Cine Mo!
- September 16: Story of My Life on Kapamilya Channel
- September 16: Pinoy Crime Stories on Pinoy Hits
- September 16: AT: Adulting in Tandem, Census Serbilis, Global Pinoy Konek, Go Agri, Inside Malacañang, Mabuhay Pilipinas, Para sa Masa, Paul's Alarm, Radyo Pilipinas News Nationwide (Saturday edition), Regional Roundup, Ulat Bayan Weekend, Usap-Usapan! and Usaping Legal on Radyo Pilipinas 1 Television
- September 17: Celebrating Life, Kalinga Hatid ng Red Cross, Meet the Press on Air and Pulso ng Pilipino on Radyo Pilipinas 1 Television
- September 18: Fight News Weekly and Punto Asintado Reload on Radyo Pilipinas 1 Television
- September 25: Love Before Sunrise on GTV, I Heart Movies and Pinoy Hits
- September 25: Headline Ngayon Express on TeleRadyo Serbisyo
- September 30: Oras ng Himala on One PH
- October 1: Sparkle U on GTV and Pinoy Hits
- October 2: Bangon na, Bayan! (Dobol B TV) on GTV
- October 7: Ligtas Dapat on TeleRadyo Serbisyo
- October 10: GSIS Ginhawa for All on DZRH TV
- October 14: It's Your Lucky Day on GTV, Jeepney TV and Kapamilya Channel
- October 14: The Leaves on Heart of Asia
- October 14: The Croods: Family Tree on PIE Channel
- October 14: Headline Ngayon Weekend and Safe Space on TeleRadyo Serbisyo
- October 16: Can't Buy Me Love on Jeepney TV and Kapamilya Channel
- October 22: Sine Date Weekends (2nd incarnation) on GTV
- October 22: Maharlika Pilipinas Volleyball Association on One PH
- October 23: Mint to Be on Heart of Asia
- October 23: Forbidden Fruit (ETCetye) on SolarFlix
- October 28: Bubu and the Little Owls and Dinoman on Jeepney TV and Kapamilya Channel
- November 4: Siyensikat (season 4) on CNN Philippines
- November 4: Biyahe ni Drew on Pinoy Hits
- November 5: Sa Likod ng Kontrobersyal on DZRH TV
- November 6: Black Rider on GTV and Pinoy Hits
- November 7: Heneral Tuna on Knowledge Channel
- November 13: Witch's Love on Heart of Asia
- November 13: Dragons: The Nine Realms on PIE Channel
- November 13: Stolen Life on Pinoy Hits
- November 19: Art2art on DZRH TV
- November 20: Lovers & Liars on Pinoy Hits
- November 20: ATM: Ano'ng Take Mo? on TeleRadyo Serbisyo

==== Unknown ====
- Quiet Moments and Usapang Kaperahan on TeleRadyo Serbisyo

==== Re-runs ====
- January 1: Piggy Tales and Yo-kai Watch (season 3) on GTV^{2}
- January 1: Hello from the Other Side on Heart of Asia^{26}
- January 1: Two Wives (2014) on Jeepney TV^{1}
- January 2: Leya, ang Pinakamagandang Babae sa Ilalim ng Lupa on BuKo Channel^{2}
- January 2: VIP on Heart of Asia^{2}
- January 2: Bridges of Love and Momay on Jeepney TV^{1}
- January 2: A Soldier's Heart on Kapamilya Channel
- January 7: Celebrity Samurai on BuKo Channel^{3}
- January 7: Almost Paradise (season 1) and Robocar Poli^{5} on Kapamilya Channel
- January 9: Bleach (season 1) on GTV^{2}
- January 9: Princess Hours^{1}^{2}^{8}^{15} and Queen and I^{2} on Heart of Asia
- January 16: Daisy Siete: Tabachingching on BuKo Channel^{2}
- January 16: Super Laff-In on Cine Mo!^{1}^{8}
- January 16: Prince of Wolf on Heart of Asia^{26}
- January 16: Anne of Green Gables^{2}^{5}^{16}^{25}, Bagito^{1} and Dream Dad^{1} on Jeepney TV
- January 16: The Better Half on PIE Channel^{1}^{8}
- January 16: Because of You^{2}^{18}^{33}, Buena Familia^{2}^{18}^{33}, Dading^{2}^{33}, Daig Kayo ng Lola Ko^{2}, Dwarfina^{2}^{18}^{33}, Kakambal ni Eliana^{2}^{33} and Pyra: Babaeng Apoy^{2}^{18} on Pinoy Hits
- January 16: Corazón Salvaje and The Two Lives of Estela Carrillo on Telenovela Channel
- January 21: Ang Pinaka^{7}^{16}, Pop Talk^{7}, Reel Time^{7} and Taste Buddies^{7} on Pinoy Hits
- January 22: Alamat^{2}, Ang Mahiwagang Baul^{2}, Art Angel^{2}, Day Off^{7}^{16}, Dear Uge^{2}, Ismol Family^{2}, Sherlock Jr.^{2} and Wagas^{2}^{7} on Pinoy Hits
- January 23: Judy Abbott on Jeepney TV^{1}^{5}^{16}^{25}
- January 29: Nang Ngumiti ang Langit on Jeepney TV^{1}
- January 30: Hotel del Luna on Kapamilya Channel^{1}
- January 30: A Kiss in a Rain (ETCerye) on SolarFlix^{17}
- February 4: Lie After Lie on Heart of Asia^{2}
- February 5: Gokusen (season 1) on GTV^{2}^{29}
- February 6: Miss The Dragon on Heart of Asia^{2}
- February 12: Ysabella on Jeepney TV^{1}
- February 13: H3O: Ha Ha Ha Over on BuKo Channel^{16}
- February 13: Code Name: Yong Pal on Heart of Asia^{2}^{26}
- February 13: Imortal on Jeepney TV^{1}
- February 20: One the Woman on Heart of Asia^{2}
- February 20: Playhouse on Jeepney TV^{1}
- February 27: My Husband in Law on Heart of Asia^{2}
- March 4: Art of a Spirit on Heart of Asia
- March 6: Dragon Ball Z on GTV^{2}^{17}
- March 6: May Isang Pangarap on Jeepney TV^{1}
- March 11: Road Trip (3rd incarnation) on Pinoy Hits^{2}
- March 12: The Last Empress on Heart of Asia^{2}
- March 13: Yo-kai Watch Shadowside on GTV^{2}
- March 13: I Hear Your Voice on Heart of Asia^{2}
- March 13: Galema: Anak ni Zuma on Jeepney TV^{1}
- March 13: Got to Believe on PIE Channel^{1}^{8}
- March 18: The Bureau of Magical Things on GTV^{2}
- March 18: Game of Affection^{2} and Playful Kiss^{2}^{26} on Heart of Asia
- March 20: Since I Found You and We Will Survive on Jeepney TV^{1}
- March 27: The Skywatcher on Heart of Asia^{2}
- March 27: La Luna Sangre on Jeepney TV^{1}
- April 1: The Witch's Diner on Heart of Asia^{2}
- April 3: Marco^{2}^{5}^{16}^{25}, My Super D^{1} and The Trapp Family Singers^{1}^{5}^{16}^{25} on Jeepney TV
- April 9: He's Into Her (season 1) on Jeepney TV^{19}^{25}
- April 10: Man of Vengeance^{2} and Me Always You^{26} on Heart of Asia
- April 17: Marimar (ETCerye) on SolarFlix^{2}^{3}^{16}^{17}
- April 29: The Sand Princess on Heart of Asia^{2}
- April 29: Bubble Up on Hallypop^{32}
- May 1: Ghost Fighter^{2}^{27} and Martin Mystery^{2}^{16} on GTV
- May 1: The Herbal Master on Heart of Asia^{2}
- May 1: Noah and Precious Hearts Romances Presents: Los Bastardos on Jeepney TV^{1}
- May 1: The Tale of Nokdu on Kapamilya Channel^{1}
- May 8: Mundo Mo'y Akin and Prophecy of Love on Heart of Asia^{2}
- May 8: Adarna, Hiram na Alaala and Rhodora X on Pinoy Hits^{2}^{18}
- May 13: Front Row on Pinoy Hits^{2}^{7}
- May 14: Init sa Magdamag on Jeepney TV^{3}^{19}^{25}
- May 15: Dugong Buhay^{1}, Little Women II^{1}^{5}^{25} and Sabel^{1} on Jeepney TV
- May 22: Love in the Moonlight^{1}^{8}^{21}^{26}, Mr. Merman^{26} and The Romantic Doctor 2^{2} on Heart of Asia
- May 27: Gokusen (season 2) on GTV^{2}^{29}
- May 28: The New Legends of Monkey on GTV^{2}
- May 29: Charlotte^{1}^{2}^{5}^{19}^{25}, Nathaniel^{1} and Pusong Ligaw^{1} on Jeepney TV
- May 29: The Borrowed Wife on Pinoy Hits^{2}
- June 2: Klasmeyts on Cine Mo!^{1}^{8}
- June 3: In Time With You on Heart of Asia^{26}
- June 5: Jumong on GTV^{2}^{16}
- June 5: Doctor John on Heart of Asia^{26}
- June 5: Pyra: Babaeng Apoy on Pinoy Hits^{2}^{33}
- June 17: Ilustrado on Pinoy Hits^{2}^{7}^{18}
- June 19: 100 Days to Heaven on Jeepney TV^{1}
- June 25: Tale of the Nine Tailed on Heart of Asia^{2}
- June 26: Grazilda and My Forever Sunshine on Heart of Asia^{2}
- June 30: Lastikman^{1} and My Little Juan^{1}^{5}^{8} on Kapamilya Channel
- July 1: Where Stars Land on Heart of Asia^{7}
- July 1: Kung Ako'y Iiwan Mo and Super Inggo on Jeepney TV^{1}
- July 1: Super Inggo on Kapamilya Channel^{1}^{8}
- July 3: Palibhasa Lalake on Cine Mo!^{1}^{8}
- July 3: About Time on Heart of Asia^{2}
- July 3: Lastikman^{1} and My Little Juan^{1}^{5} on Jeepney TV
- July 8: Qpids on Jeepney TV^{1}
- July 9: Moon Embracing the Sun on Heart of Asia^{2}^{26}
- July 10: The Red Sleeve on Heart of Asia^{2}
- July 15: Blacklist on Heart of Asia^{26}
- July 17: Legend of the Blue Sea^{1}^{21}^{26} and Signal^{4}^{21}^{26} on Heart of Asia
- July 17: The Greatest Love on Jeepney TV^{1}
- July 17: Minute to Win It: Last Man Standing (seasons 1 and 2) on Kapamilya Channel^{1}
- July 17: Little Nanay on Pinoy Hits^{2}^{18}^{33}
- July 30: The Gifted on Heart of Asia^{2}
- August 5: Pan Tau on GTV^{2}
- August 6: Meteo Heroes on GTV^{2}
- August 7: Be My Lady and Dolce Amore on Jeepney TV^{1}^{19}
- August 14: Biglang Sibol, Bayang Impasibol and Daisy Siete: Kambalilong on BuKo Channel^{2}
- August 14: Show Window: The Queen's House on Heart of Asia^{2}
- August 14: Kadenang Ginto on PIE Channel^{1}^{8}^{19}
- August 14: Dwarfina and Munting Heredera on Pinoy Hits^{2}^{18}^{33}
- August 14: Crown of Tears on Telenovela Channel
- August 19: Kampanerang Kuba on Jeepney TV^{1}
- August 21: Behind Your Smile^{26} and My Absolute Boyfriend^{7} on Heart of Asia
- August 21: Asintado on Jeepney TV^{1}^{19}
- August 26: Call Me Tita on Kapamilya Channel^{1}
- August 28: The Wolf on Heart of Asia^{2}
- September 2: The Gifted: Graduation on Heart of Asia^{2}
- September 3: Flame of Recca on GTV^{2}^{7}
- September 4: To Me, It's Simply You on Heart of Asia^{2}
- September 4: Sahaya^{2} and The Half Sisters^{2}^{18}^{33} on Pinoy Hits
- September 4: Road to Destiny on Telenovela Channel
- September 9: The Maid on Heart of Asia^{2}
- September 10: One Night Steal on Heart of Asia^{2}
- September 11: Scarlet Heart on Heart of Asia^{2}^{26}
- September 11: Ang sa Iyo ay Akin on Jeepney TV^{19}^{25}
- September 16: Oh My Baby on Heart of Asia^{2}
- September 16: Karelasyon on Pinoy Hits^{2}^{7}^{18}
- September 17: Detective Conan season 9, The Endlings and Ultraman R/B on GTV^{2}
- September 17: Dahil May Isang Ikaw and Sa Sandaling Kailangan Mo Ako on Jeepney TV^{1}
- September 18: Parekoy on Cine Mo!^{1}
- September 18: Jackie Chan Adventures on GTV^{1}^{2}^{12}
- September 25: The Penthouse (season 1) on Heart of Asia^{2}
- September 25: Forevermore on PIE Channel^{1}^{8}
- September 25: Kakambal ni Eliana on Pinoy Hits^{2}^{33}
- September 30: Hinahanap-hanap Kita on Kapamilya Channel
- October 1: Angry Birds Toons on GTV^{2}
- October 1: Sky Castle on Heart of Asia^{2}
- October 2: The World of a Married Couple on Kapamilya Channel
- October 8: Hawak Kamay on Jeepney TV^{1}
- October 9: My Dear Heart on Jeepney TV^{1}
- October 15: Innocent Defendant on Heart of Asia^{2}^{26}
- October 16: Ghost Doctor on Heart of Asia^{2}
- October 16: Angelito: Batang Ama on Jeepney TV^{1}
- October 22: Backstreet Rookie on Heart of Asia^{2}
- October 23: Juan Happy Love Story^{2}, Princess Charming^{2} and The Merciless Judge^{26} on Heart of Asia
- October 23: Aryana^{1} and Pasión de Amor^{1}^{4} on Jeepney TV
- October 28: Mr. Bean on Jeepney TV and Kapamilya Channel^{1}^{15}^{22}^{28}
- October 30: Kokey^{1} and Kung Fu Kids^{1}^{5} on Jeepney TV
- October 30: Kokey^{1}, Superbook (1982)^{1}^{2}^{5} and The Flying House (2023 dub reboot)^{1}^{2}^{5}^{34} on Kapamilya Channel
- October 30: Dading^{2}^{33} and Love You Two^{2}^{30} on Pinoy Hits
- November 4: Angel's Last Mission and VIP on Heart of Asia^{2}
- November 4: I Am U on Kapamilya Channel^{1}
- November 4: Alamat^{2}^{7}, Pop Talk^{7}^{26} and Sirkus^{2}^{7} on Pinoy Hits
- November 6: Gokusen (season 1)^{2}^{29} and My Love from the Star^{2} on Heart of Asia
- November 11: Legend of Fuyao^{7} and Prince of Wolf^{26} on Heart of Asia
- November 13: Whattamen on Cine Mo!^{1}
- November 13: Walang Hanggang Paalam on Jeepney TV^{19}^{25}
- November 13: In Between (ETCerye) on SolarFlix
- November 18: Wanted: Ang Serye on One PH^{3}
- November 19: And I Love You So on Jeepney TV^{1}
- November 20: My Husband in Law on GTV^{2}^{33}
- November 20: The Penthouse (season 2) on Heart of Asia^{2}
- November 20: Sine Totoo on Pinoy Hits^{2}^{7}
- November 26: Dinofroz^{2}, Mako Mermaids^{2}^{7} and Puppy in My Pocket^{2} on GTV
- November 27: My Shy Boss on Heart of Asia^{2}
- November 27: Little Champ on Jeepney TV^{1}
- December 1: Jewel in the Palace on GTV^{2}^{7}^{16}^{29}
- December 2: Dahil sa Pag-Ibig on Jeepney TV^{1}
- December 2: Click, Like, Share (season 1) on Kapamilya Channel
- December 3: Gimik on Jeepney TV^{1}
- December 4: The Heirs on Heart of Asia^{1}^{8}
- December 11: Gokusen (season 2) on Heart of Asia^{2}^{29}
- December 18: Muling Buksan ang Puso on Jeepney TV^{1}
- December 18: I Can See You (season 2) on Pinoy Hits^{2}
- December 25: Are We Alright?^{26} and The Penthouse (season 3)^{2} on Heart of Asia
- December 31: Martin Mystery on GTV^{2}^{16}
- December 31: Legend of the Blue Sea on Heart of Asia^{1}^{21}^{26}
- Notes
1. ^ ^{a} Originally aired on ABS-CBN (now Kapamilya Channel)
2. ^ ^{b} Originally aired on GMA
3. ^ ^{c} Originally aired on TV5
4. ^ ^{d} Originally aired on Cine Mo!
5. ^ ^{e} Originally aired on Yey! (now defunct)
6. ^ ^{f} Originally aired on S+A (now Aliw 23)
7. ^ ^{g} Originally aired on GMA News TV (now GTV)
8. ^ ^{h} Originally aired on Jeepney TV
9. ^ ^{i} Originally aired on Sari-Sari Channel
10. ^ ^{j} Originally aired on Hero (now defunct)
11. ^ ^{k} Originally aired on ETC (now SolarFlix)
12. ^ ^{l} Originally aired on Jack TV (now defunct)
13. ^ ^{m} Originally aired on 2nd Avenue (now defunct)
14. ^ ^{n} Originally aired on CT (now defunct)
15. ^ ^{o} Originally aired on Studio 23 (now Aliw 23)
16. ^ ^{p} Originally aired on Q (now GTV)
17. ^ ^{q} Originally aired on RPN (now CNN Philippines)
18. ^ ^{r} Originally aired on Fox Filipino (now defunct)
19. ^ ^{s} Originally aired on Kapamilya Channel
20. ^ ^{t} Originally aired on Metro Channel
21. ^ ^{u} Originally aired on Asianovela Channel (now defunct)
22. ^ ^{v} Originally aired on PTV
23. ^ ^{w} Originally aired on Knowledge Channel
24. ^ ^{x} Originally aired on CNN Philippines
25. ^ ^{y} Originally aired on A2Z
26. ^ ^{z} Originally aired on GTV
27. ^ ^{aa} Originally aired on IBC
28. ^ ^{ab} Originally aired on ABC (now TV5)
29. ^ ^{ac} Originally aired on TeleAsia Filipino (now defunct)
30. ^ ^{ad} Originally aired on One Screen (now defunct)
31. ^ ^{ae} Originally aired on Colours (now defunct)
32. ^ ^{af} Originally aired on SolarFlix
33. ^ ^{ag} Originally aired on Heart of Asia
34. ^ ^{ah} Originally aired on ZOE TV (now Light TV)

=== Video streaming services ===
The following are programs that debuted on video streaming services:

- January 1: Marites University on YouTube (MU Entertainment)
- January 13: Iskovery Nights (season 1) on YouTube (Isko Moreno)
- February 13: FPJ's Batang Quiapo on iWantTFC
- March 10: Zero Kilometers Away on Facebook and YouTube (GMA Public Affairs)
- March 17: Teen Clash on iWantTFC
- March 18: The Write One on Viu
- March 26: Sssshhh! on VivaMax
- April 23: Pantaxa: Laiya on VivaMax
- April 24: All TV News: Balitang Recap on Facebook (All TV News)
- April 28: Love Bites (season 2) on YouTube (ABS-CBN Entertainment)
- May 1: The Rain In España on Viva One
- May 12: Iskovery Nights (season 2) on YouTube (Isko Moreno)
- May 18: In My Dreams on Facebook and YouTube (GMA Public Affairs)
- May 24: Sparks Camp (season 1) on YouTube (Black Sheep)
- May 27: Unbreak My Heart on iWantTFC and Viu
- June 1: Cattleya Killer on Amazon Prime Video
- June 2: Drag You & Me on iWantTFC
- June 4: Sex Hub on VivaMax
- June 17: Kuya Dags on YouTube (Blvck Entertainment Production)
- July 2: High on Sex 2 on VivaMax
- July 6: Fit Check: Confessions of an Ukay Queen on Amazon Prime Video
- July 10: Deadly Love on Viva One
- August 1: ReTox: 2 Be Continued on YouTube (ABS-CBN Entertainment)
- August 2: Drag Race Philippines (season 2) and Drag Race Philippines: Untucked! (season 2) on HBO Go and WOW Presents Plus
- August 7: PGT Rewind: The Unforgettable moments of Pilipinas Got Talent on YouTube (Pilipinas Got Talent)
- August 12: Stars on Stars on Facebook and YouTube (Jeepney TV)
- August 21: Kung Hindi Lang Tayo Sumuko on Viva One
- August 27: Secret Campus on VivaMax
- August 31: Comedy Island: Philippines on Amazon Prime Video
- September 1: Iskovery Nights (season 3) on YouTube (Isko Moreno)
- September 7: Dirty Linen on Amazon Prime Video
- September 15: Fractured on iWantTFC and YouTube (iwantTFC)
- September 22: Philippines' Number 1 on YouTube (GMA Public Affairs)
- September 23: Love Before Sunrise on Viu
- October 5: Linlang on Amazon Prime Video
- October 8: Halo-Halo X on VivaMax
- October 13: Can't Buy Me Love on iWantTFC and Netflix
- October 20: Hex Boyfriend on YouTube (ABS-CBN Entertainment)
- November 2: Simula sa Gitna on Amazon Prime Video
- November 19: Araro on VivaMax
- November 20: Safe Skies, Archer on Viva One
- November 24: Replacing Chef Chico on Netflix
- November 30: Roadkillers on Amazon Prime Video

== Returning or renamed programs ==
=== Major networks ===
Show	Last aired	Retitled as/Season/Notes	Channel	Return date
Happy ToGetHer	2022	Same (season 3)	GMA	January 8
Healing Galing Live!	2022 (UNTV)	Healing Galing	TV5	January 15
Tonight with Boy Abunda	2020 (ABS-CBN)	Fast Talk with Boy Abunda	GMA / Pinoy Hits	January 23
The Bottomline with Boy Abunda	2020 (ABS-CBN / ANC)	Cayetano in Action with Boy Abunda	GMA	February 5
Oras ng Himala	2021	Same	TV5	January 17
The Chiefs	2022	Same	TV5	January 22
The Clash	2021	Same (season 5)	GMA	January 22
Philippine Basketball Association	2022 (season 47: "Commissioner's Cup")	Same (season 47: "Governor's Cup")	TV5 / One Sports / PBA Rush	January 22
Reporter's Notebook	2023 (GTV)	Same	GMA	February 4
Detective Conan	2020	Same (season 9)	GMA	February 13
Kamen Rider	2015 (season 21: "OOO")	Same (season 30: "Zero-One")	GMA	February 18
The Voice Kids	2019 (ABS-CBN)	Same (season 5)	A2Z / Kapamilya Channel / TV5	February 25
I Can See Your Voice	2022	Same (season 5)	A2Z / Kapamilya Channel / TV5	March 4
Face to Face	2013	Face 2 Face (2nd Incarnation)	TV5 / One PH	May 1
Voltes V	1979 (GMA) / 1987 (PTV) / 1988 (ABS-CBN) / 1989 (RPN) / 1990 (IBC) / 2006 (Hero)	Voltes V: Legacy	GMA / GTV / I Heart Movies / Pinoy Hits	May 8
Everybody, Sing!	2023	Same (season 3)	A2Z / Kapamilya Channel / TV5	June 3
Luv Is	2023 (Caught in his Arms)	Same (Love at First Read)	GMA	June 12
Team Yey!	2020	Team Yey! Shorts	A2Z / Jeepney TV / Kapamilya Channel	June 24
TVJ on 5	1992 (ABC)	E.A.T.	TV5 / One PH / BuKo Channel	July 1
Team A	2023	Same (season 2)	TV5 / Sari-Sari Channel	July 15
My Puhunan	2020 (ABS-CBN / DZMM TeleRadyo / Jeepney TV)	My Puhunan: Kaya Mo!	A2Z / Kapamilya Channel / ANC	July 16
TikTalks	2023	Same (season 2)	TV5 / One PH	July 30
Wow Mali	2015 (as Lakas ng Tama!)	Same (as Doble Tama!)	TV5 / BuKo Channel	August 26
Tomorrow's World	2023 (TV5)	Same	A2Z	September 3
Dino Dan	2023	Dino Dana	GMA	September 10
Maging Sino Ka Man	2007 (ABS-CBN)	Same (2023)	GMA / GTV / I Heart Movies / Pinoy Hits	September 11
Aksyon Weekend	2014	Frontline Pilipinas Weekend	TV5	October 14
Philippine Basketball Association	2023 (TV5 / One Sports / PBA Rush; season 47: "Governor's Cup")	Same (season 48: "Commissioner's Cup")	A2Z / One PH / PBA Rush	November 5

=== State-owned networks ===
Show	Last aired	Retitled as/Season/Notes	Channel	Return date
Oras ng Himala	2021	Same	PTV	February 13
EZ Shop	2022	Same	IBC	March 16
Punto Asintado	2017 (AksyonTV)	Punto Asintado Reload	PTV / Radyo Pilipinas 1 Television	September 18
Pilipinas Super League	2023 (Net 25)	Same (2024 President's Cup)	IBC	November 9
Asenso Pinoy	2023 (A2Z)	Asenso KaPinoy	PTV	December 2

=== Minor networks ===
Show	Last aired	Retitled as/Season/Notes	Channel	Return date
Pasada Balita	2018 (CLTV)	Same	Aliw 23	January 30
Gikan sa Masa, para sa Masa	2018 (ABS-CBN Davao)	Same	SMNI	January 30
IZ Balita Nationwide Sabado	2023 (IZTV)	IZ Balita Sabado	Aliw 23	February 4
IZ Balita Nationwide Linggo	2023 (IZTV)	IZ Balita Linggo	Aliw 23	February 5
House of Praise	2023	Praise, Inc.	Light TV	March 6
GoodWill	2023	Same (season 2)	Net 25	May 21
In the Heart of Business	2023	NegoShow	Aliw 23	June 6
NBL - Pilipinas	2022 (Solar Sports; season 5: "Chairman's Cup")	Same (season 6: "President's Cup")	Aliw 23	June 25
Love and Everythaaang	2023	Love, Tonipet and Everythaaang	Net 25	June 26
Light Cinema Specials	2023	Christian Cinema	Light TV	August 2
Bagong Barangay ng Mamamayan in Action	2023 (IBC)	Same	Aliw 23	August 3
Bahay Pinoy, Buhay Pinoy	2017 (Inquirer 990 Television)	Same (2nd incarnation)	Aliw 23	September 10
Arangkada Balita	2015 (DZRH News Television) / 2016 (CLTV)	Same (3rd incarnation)	Aliw 23	September 11
Shakey's Super League	2023 (CNN Philippines; season 1: "National Invitationals")	Same (season 2: "Pre-season Championship")	Aliw 23 / Solar Sports / TAP Sports	September 16
NBL - Pilipinas	2023 (season 6: "President's Cup")	Same (season 6: "Chairman's Cup")	Aliw 23	December 1

=== Other channels ===
Show	Last aired	Retitled as/Season/Notes	Channel	Return date
I Heart PH	2022	Same (season 7)	CNN Philippines	January 22
Spikers' Turf	2022 (season 4: "Open Conference")	Same (season 5: "Open Conference")	One Sports / One Sports+	January 22
Premier Volleyball League	2022 (season 5: "Reinforced Conference")	Same (season 6: "First All-Filipino Conference"; season 19 as Shakey's V-League)	One Sports / One Sports+	February 4
UAAP Men's Football	2019 (Liga / S+A)	Same (season 85)	UAAP Varsity Channel	February 19
UAAP Men's & Women's Volleyball	2020 (Liga / S+A)	Same (season 85)	One Sports / UAAP Varsity Channel	February 25
Maharlika Pilipinas Basketball League	2022	Same (season 5)	One PH	March 11
Siyensikat	2022	Same (season 3)	CNN Philippines	April 22
Chinese by Blood, Filipino by Heart	2022	Same (season 4)	CNN Philippines	June 4
BalitaOnenan!	2022	Same (season 2)	BuKo Channel	June 12
Premier Volleyball League	2023 (season 6: "First All-Filipino Conference")	Same (season 6: "Invitational Conference"; season 19 as Shakey's V-League)	One Sports / One Sports+	June 27
Gising Pilipinas	2020 (Kapamilya Channel / TeleRadyo)	Same	TeleRadyo Serbisyo	June 30
TeleRadyo Balita	2023 (Kapamilya Channel / TeleRadyo)	TeleRadyo Serbisyo Balita	TeleRadyo Serbisyo	June 30
Pintig Balita	2020 (DZMM TeleRadyo)	Pintig ng Bayan	TeleRadyo Serbisyo	June 30
Lingkod Kapamilya sa TeleRadyo	2023 (TeleRadyo)	Tatak: Serbisyo	TeleRadyo Serbisyo	June 30
Headline Pilipinas	2020 (ANC) / 2023 (TeleRadyo)	Headline Ngayon	TeleRadyo Serbisyo	June 30
Winner sa Life	2023 (TeleRadyo)	Win Today	TeleRadyo Serbisyo	July 1
Your Daily Do's	2023 (TeleRadyo)	Iwas Sakit, Iwas Gastos	TeleRadyo Serbisyo	July 1
Bida Konsyumer	2023 (TeleRadyo)	Wais Konsyumer	TeleRadyo Serbisyo	July 1
Omaga-Diaz Reports	2020 (ANC) / 2023 (TeleRadyo)	Headlines of the Day	TeleRadyo Serbisyo	July 1
Good Job	2020 (ANC) / 2023 (TeleRadyo)	Aprub 'Yan!	TeleRadyo Serbisyo	July 2
Diskarte	2023 (TeleRadyo)	Panalong Diskarte	TeleRadyo Serbisyo	July 2
Sagot Ko 'Yan!	2021 (TeleRadyo)	Wow Sikat	TeleRadyo Serbisyo	July 2
The Final Pitch	2022	Same (season 9)	CNN Philippines	July 9
I Heart PH	2023	Same (season 8)	CNN Philippines	July 16
Todo-Todo Walang Preno	2020 (TeleRadyo)	SKL: Share Ko Lang	TeleRadyo Serbisyo	July 17
Usapang de Campanilla	2020 (DZMM TeleRadyo)	Hello Attorney	TeleRadyo Serbisyo	July 17
Playback	2023 (TeleRadyo)	TeleRadyo Serbisyo Rewind	TeleRadyo Serbisyo	July 17
On the Spot	2021 (Kapamilya Channel) / 2023 (TeleRadyo)	Isyu Spotted	TeleRadyo Serbisyo	July 17
Pasada sa TeleRadyo	2023 (TeleRadyo)	Pasada	TeleRadyo Serbisyo	July 17
Sakto	2023 (Kapamilya Channel / TeleRadyo)	Kasalo	TeleRadyo Serbisyo	July 17
TeleRadyo Special Coverage	2022 (TeleRadyo)	TeleRadyo Serbisyo & Radyo 630 Special Coverage	TeleRadyo Serbisyo	July 24
Shakey's Super League	2022 (IBC; season 1: "Pre-season Championship")	Same (season 1: "National Invitationals")	CNN Philippines / Solar Sports	July 29
Balita Ngayon	1987 (ABS-CBN) / 2023 (TeleRadyo)	TeleRadyo Serbisyo Newsbreak	TeleRadyo Serbisyo	July 31
Yesterday	2020 (TeleRadyo)	K-Paps Playlist	TeleRadyo Serbisyo	August 5
Kuwentuhang Lokal	2020 (ANC) / 2021 (TeleRadyo)	Ang Tinig Nyo	TeleRadyo Serbisyo	August 5
Lingkod Aksyon	2021 (TeleRadyo)	Pasado Serbisyo	TeleRadyo Serbisyo	August 5
Pinoy Vibes	2020 (DZMM TeleRadyo)	Feel Kita	TeleRadyo Serbisyo	August 5
Kapamilya Konek	2023 (TeleRadyo)	Konek Ka D'yan	TeleRadyo Serbisyo	August 6
Kumu Star Ka!	2023 (Jeepney TV / TeleRadyo)	Travel ni Ahwel	TeleRadyo Serbisyo	August 6
Radyo Patrol Balita Linggo	2018 (DZMM TeleRadyo)	Story Outlook	TeleRadyo Serbisyo	August 6
Salitang Buhay	2020 (DZMM TeleRadyo)	GBU: God Bless U	TeleRadyo Serbisyo	August 6
Rosary Hour	2023 (TeleRadyo)	Same	TeleRadyo Serbisyo	August 6
V-League	2022 (CNN Philippines; season 1: "Collegiate Challenge")	Same (season 2: "Collegiate Challenge")	Solar Sports	August 16
Business Matters	2022	Same (season 10)	CNN Philippines	August 19
OMJ!	2020 (DZMM TeleRadyo)	Bongga Kay Jhai	TeleRadyo Serbisyo	August 20
NegoSHEnte	2023 (TeleRadyo)	Same	Pinoy Hits	August 27
Saturday Cinema Hits	2021	Same	GTV	September 2
Balitanghali	2023	Balita Ko	GTV / Heart of Asia / I Heart Movies / Pinoy Hits	September 4
National Football League	2023	Same (2023 season)	Premier Sports	September 8
National Collegiate Athletic Association	2023	Same (season 99)	GTV	September 24
Radyo Patrol Balita Alas-Kwatro	2017 (DZMM TeleRadyo)	Headline Ngayon Express	TeleRadyo Serbisyo	September 25
University Athletic Association of the Philippines	2023	Same (season 86)	One Sports / UAAP Varsity Channel	September 30
Red Alert sa TeleRadyo	2020 (TeleRadyo)	Ligtas Dapat	TeleRadyo Serbisyo	October 7
Headline Pilipinas Weekend	2020 (ANC) / 2021 (TeleRadyo)	Headline Ngayon Weekend	TeleRadyo Serbisyo	October 14
Juander Titser	2021 (TeleRadyo)	Safe Space	TeleRadyo Serbisyo	October 14
Premier Volleyball League	2023 (season 6: "Invitational Conference")	Same (season 6: "Second All-Filipino Conference"; season 19 as Shakey's V-League)	One Sports / One Sports+	October 15
Spiker's Turf	2023 (season 5: "Open Conference")	Same (season 5; "Invitational Conference")	One Sports / One Sports+	October 20
Sine Date Weekends	2022	Same	GTV	October 22
National Basketball Association	2023 (TV5 / One Sports / NBA TV Philippines)	Same (2023–24 season)	One Sports / NBA TV Philippines	October 26
Siyensikat	2023	Same (season 4)	CNN Philippines	November 4
Haybol Pinoy	2019 (DZMM TeleRadyo)	ATM: Ano'ng Take Mo?	TeleRadyo Serbisyo	November 20

=== Video streaming services ===
Show	Last aired	Retitled as/Season/Notes	Service	Return date
Chismax: Chismis to the Max	2020 (DZMM TeleRadyo)	Marites University	YouTube (MU Entertainment)	January 1
Love Bites	2022	Same (season 2)	YouTube (ABS-CBN Entertainment)	April 28
Iskovery Nights	2023	Same (season 2)	YouTube (Isko Moreno)	May 12
2 Good 2 Be True	2022 (A2Z / iWantTFC / Jeepney TV / Kapamilya Channel / Netflix / TV5)	ReTox: 2 Be Continued	YouTube (ABS-CBN Entertainment)	August 1
Drag Race Philippines: Untucked!	2022	Same (season 2)	HBO Go / WOW Presents Plus	August 2
Drag Race Philippines	2022	Same (season 2)	HBO Go / WOW Presents Plus	August 2
Iskovery Nights	2023	Same (season 3)	YouTube (Isko Moreno)	September 1

== Programs transferring networks ==
=== Major networks ===
Date	Show	No. of seasons	Moved from	Moved to
January 15	Healing Galing Live!	—N/a	UNTV	TV5 (as Healing Galing)
January 23	Tonight with Boy Abunda	—N/a	ABS-CBN (now Kapamilya Channel)	GMA / Pinoy Hits (as Fast Talk with Boy Abunda)
February 4	Reporter's Notebook	—N/a	GTV	GMA
February 5	The Bottomline with Boy Abunda	—N/a	ABS-CBN (now Kapamilya Channel) / ANC	GMA (as Cayetano in Action with Boy Abunda)
February 25	The Voice Kids	5	ABS-CBN (now Kapamilya Channel)	A2Z / Kapamilya Channel / TV5
July 16	My Puhunan	—N/a	ABS-CBN (now Kapamilya Channel) / DZMM TeleRadyo (now TeleRadyo Serbisyo) / Jeepney TV	A2Z / Kapamilya Channel / ANC (as My Puhunan: Kaya Mo!)
September 3	Tomorrow's World	—N/a	TV5	A2Z
September 11	Maging Sino Ka Man	—N/a	ABS-CBN (now Kapamilya Channel)	GMA / GTV / I Heart Movies / Pinoy Hits (as a remake)
September 16	Healing Galing	—N/a	GTV	GMA
November 5	Philippine Basketball Association	48	TV5	A2Z
November 18	Dear SV	—N/a	CNN Philippines	GMA

=== State-owned networks ===
Date	Show	No. of seasons	Moved from	Moved to
January 30	Bitag Live	—N/a	PTV	IBC
September 18	Punto Asintado	—N/a	AksyonTV (now One Sports)	PTV / Radyo Pilipinas 1 Television (as Punto Asintado Reload)
November 9	Pilipinas Super League	2024 President's Cup	Net 25	IBC
December 2	Asenso Pinoy	—N/a	A2Z	PTV (as Asenso KaPinoy)

=== Minor networks ===
Date	Show	No. of seasons	Moved from	Moved to
January 30	Gikan sa Masa, para sa Masa	—N/a	ABS-CBN Davao (now defunct)	SMNI
January 30	Pasada Balita	—N/a	CLTV	Aliw 23
June 25	National Basketball League - Philippines	6	Solar Sports	Aliw 23 (as NBL Pilipinas)
August 3	Bagong Barangay ng Mamamayan in Action	—N/a	IBC	Aliw 23
September 10	Bahay Pinoy, Buhay Pinoy	—N/a	Inquirer 990 Television (now defunct)	Aliw 23
September 11	Arangkada Balita	—N/a	CLTV / DZRH News Television (now DZRH TV)	Aliw 23
September 16	Shakey's Super League	2	CNN Philippines	Aliw 23 / TAP Sports

=== Other channels ===
Date	Show	No. of seasons	Moved from	Moved to
February 4	Agri TV Atbp.: Kasama sa Hanapbuhay	—N/a	IBC	One Sports
February 4	Sabong TV	—N/a	IBC	One Sports
June 18	Healing Galing	—N/a	TV5	GTV
July 1	It's Showtime	—N/a	TV5	GTV
July 29	Shakey's Super League	1	IBC	CNN Philippines
August 16	V-League	2	CNN Philippines	Solar Sports
August 27	NegoSHEnte	—N/a	TeleRadyo (now TeleRadyo Serbisyo)	Pinoy Hits

=== Video streaming services ===
Date	Show	No. of seasons	Moved from	Moved to
January 1	Chismax: Chismis to the Max	—N/a	DZMM TeleRadyo (now TeleRadyo Serbisyo)	YouTube (MU Entertainment; as Marites University)
August 1	2 Good 2 Be True	—N/a	A2Z / iWantTFC / Jeepney TV / Kapamilya Channel / Netflix / TV5	YouTube (ABS-CBN Entertainment; as ReTox: 2 Be Continued)

== Milestone episodes ==
The following shows that made their milestone episodes in 2023:

Show	Network	Episode #	Episode title	Episode air date
The Boobay and Tekla Show	GMA / GTV	200th	"The Cash Celebration"	January 8
Family Feud (4th incarnation)	GMA	200th	"200th Episode"	January 13
Farm to Table	GTV	100th	"100th Episode"	January 15
Maria Clara at Ibarra	GMA / GTV / Pinoy Hits	100th	"Sanib-Puwersa"	February 17
Toni	All TV	100th	"R&B King and Queen: Jay-R and Mica Javier"	February 17
Magandang Buhay	A2Z / Kapamilya Channel / TV5	900th	"900th Episode"	March 7
Dapat Alam Mo!	GTV / Pinoy Hits	400th	"400th Episode"	March 17
All-Out Sundays	GMA / GTV / Heart of Asia / I Heart Movies / Pinoy Hits	100th	"Gusto ko 'Yan!"	March 19
The Iron Heart	A2Z / Kapamilya Channel / TV5	100th	"Laban ni Venus"	March 31
Daig Kayo ng Lola Ko	GMA / GTV / Pinoy Hits	300th	"Lodi League"	April 9
It's Showtime	A2Z / Jeepney TV / Kapamilya Channel / TV5	3,700th	"Summer Squad"	April 18
Abot-Kamay na Pangarap	GMA / Pinoy Hits	200th	"Kamay ng Doktor"	April 29
TiktoClock	GMA	200th	"200th Episode"	May 5
Family Feud (4th incarnation)	GMA	300th	"300th episode"	June 9
Dirty Linen	A2Z / Jeepney TV / Kapamilya Channel / TV5	100th	"Hacked"	June 13
Fast Talk with Boy Abunda	GMA / Pinoy Hits	100th	"100th Episode"	June 13
FPJ's Batang Quiapo	A2Z / Cine Mo! / Kapamilya Channel / TV5	100th	"Swerte"	July 4
Magandang Buhay	A2Z / Kapamilya Channel / TV5	1,000th	"1,000th Episode"	July 27
It's Showtime	A2Z / GTV / Jeepney TV / Kapamilya Channel	3,800th	"Gusto ko GV"	August 2
Dapat Alam Mo!	GMA / GTV / Pinoy Hits	500th	"500th Episode"	August 4
The Iron Heart	A2Z / Jeepney TV / Kapamilya Channel / TV5	200th	"Lantaran"	August 22
Abot-Kamay na Pangarap	GMA / Pinoy Hits	300th	"Trapped"	August 24
Face 2 Face	TV5 / One PH	100th	"Butangera"	September 8
Ur Da Boss	PIE Channel	100th	"100th Episode"	September 8
TiktoClock	GMA	300th	"300th Episode"	September 22
Regal Studio Presents	GMA	100th	"The Dream Band"	October 1
Bubble Gang	GMA / Pinoy Hits	1,400th	"Brand New"	October 1
E.A.T.	TV5	100th	"100th Episode"	October 24
Fast Talk with Boy Abunda	GMA / Pinoy Hits	200th	"200th Episode"	November 1
Gud Morning Kapatid	TV5	100th	"100th Episode"	November 3
Unbreak My Heart	GMA / GTV / I Heart Movies / Pinoy Hits	100th	"Ang Pagtatapos"	November 16
Pira-Pirasong Paraiso	A2Z / Kapamilya Channel / TV5	100th	"Pagtakas"	November 17
FPJ's Batang Quiapo	A2Z / Kapamilya Channel / TV5	200th	"Di Mahalata"	November 21
It's Showtime	A2Z / GTV / Jeepney TV / Kapamilya Channel	3,900th	"Hugot Vibes"	December 11
Nag-aapoy na Damdamin	A2Z / Kapamilya Channel / TV5	100th	"Nag-aapoy na Halaga"	December 11
Magandang Buhay	A2Z / Kapamilya Channel / TV5	1,100th	"1,100th Episode"	December 14
Abot-Kamay na Pangarap	GMA / Pinoy Hits	400th	"Saving Pepe"	December 19
Dapat Alam Mo!	GTV / Pinoy Hits	600th	"600th Episode"	December 22

== Finales ==
=== Major networks ===
==== A2Z ====
The following are programs that ended on A2Z:

- January 7: Asenso Pinoy
- January 20: Flower of Evil (rerun)
- February 5: Almost Paradise (season 1; rerun)
- February 10: Ever Night: War of Brilliant Splendours and Mars Ravelo's Darna: The TV Series (2022)
- February 12: Dream Maker
- February 19: Everybody, Sing! season 2
- February 25: Mr. Bean: The Animated Series (season 3; Kidz Weekend)
- March 12: The Goodbye Girl
- April 2: Beach Bros and Remi, Nobody's Girl (rerun; Kidz Weekend)
- April 23: My Sunset Girl
- April 28: The Great Show
- April 29: Tropang LOL
- May 6: Naruto: Shippuden season 10 (Kidz Weekend)
- May 14: Misis Piggy
- May 19: A Soldier's Heart
- May 21: The Voice Kids season 5
- June 3: Hero City Kids Force
- June 11: KBYN: Kaagapay ng Bayan
- June 18: Tara, G!
- June 24: Masha and the Bear and Robocar Poli (rerun; Kidz Weekend)
- July 7: Ang sa Iyo ay Akin (rerun) and How to Move On in 30 Days
- July 21: Hello, Heart
- July 23: Teen Clash
- July 24: Saying Goodbye
- July 28: The Tale of Nokdu
- August 20: Drag You & Me
- August 25: Dirty Linen
- August 26: Team Yey! Vlogs
- September 10: Call Me Tita
- September 24: Story of My Life
- September 29: The Forbidden Flower
- October 13: The Iron Heart
- October 20: Be Careful with My Heart
- October 21: Team Yey! (season 4)
- October 27: It's Your Lucky Day and Superbook Reimagined (Kidz Toon Time)
- October 28: Hinahanap-hanap Kita
- October 29: FPJ: Da King (A2Z Zinema)
- November 25: I Am U
- December 9: Click, Like, Share (season 1; rerun)
- December 28: The World of a Married Couple

===== Stopped airing =====
Program	Last airing	Resumed airing	Reason
It's Showtime	October 13	October 28	Temporary suspension of broadcast for 12-airing days, which was released by the ruling decision of Movie and Television Review and Classification Board.
Goin' Bulilit (seasons 1–5)	October 21	November 26	Season break.
Ipaglaban Mo!	October 29	February 18, 2024	Pre-empted by the 2023–24 PBA season on November 5.

==== GMA ====
The following are programs that ended on GMA Network:

- January 1: Home Base Plus (season 23)
- January 12: Agimat ng Agila (season 1; rerun)
- January 13: Mano Po Legacy: The Flower Sisters and Nakarehas na Puso
- January 14: Ultraman R/B (rerun)
- January 20: Another Miss Oh
- January 27: What's Wrong with Secretary Kim
- January 29: Telesine Presents
- February 3: Ancient Love Poetry
- February 11: Dragon Ball Z (rerun)
- February 17: Pan Tau
- February 24: Maria Clara at Ibarra
- March 3: Unica Hija and You Are My Heartbeat
- March 4: Ang Pinaka
- March 5: Martin Mystery (rerun)
- March 7: Poong, the Joseon Psychiatrist (season 1)
- March 10: 46 Days and Luv Is: Caught in His Arms
- March 17: Her Bucket List
- March 31: 24 Oras News Alert
- April 14: Bad Romeo, Bai Ling Tan and The Last Promise
- April 15: Ultraman Taiga (rerun)
- April 22: Flame of Recca (rerun)
- April 23: Meteo Heroes
- May 5: Mga Lihim ni Urduja and Underage
- May 6: Daddy's Gurl
- May 12: Love Revolution
- May 19: The Endlings
- May 25: The Write One
- May 28: The Clash season 5
- June 9: Eve
- June 16: Hearts on Ice
- June 23: AraBella, Game of Outlaws and My Dear Donovan
- June 25: Beyond Today
- July 7: Detective Conan season 9
- July 9: Ultraman Z (rerun)
- July 21: Queen Seondeok (rerun) and Revenge Note
- July 28: An Oriental Odyssey and Luv Is: Love at First Read
- August 4: Now, We Are Breaking Up
- August 6: Happy ToGetHer (season 3)
- August 18: Bad Romeo (rerun) and Still
- August 20: Walang Matigas na Pulis sa Matinik na Misis (season 1)
- August 25: The Seed of Love
- September 1: Wolfblood (season 1; rerun)
- September 3: Angry Birds Toons (rerun)
- September 8: Beauty and the Guy and Voltes V: Legacy
- September 9: Dino Dan, Imbestigador and Road Trip (3rd incarnation; rerun)
- September 22: Bride of the Water God (rerun) and Royal Blood
- September 23: Daimos (rerun)
- September 29: Dapat Alam Mo!
- September 30: Battle of the Judges
- October 13: Jirisan
- October 20: My Roommate is a Gumiho
- November 3: Maging Sino Ka Man (2023)
- November 10: Magandang Dilag and The World of Fantasy
- November 11: Karelasyon (rerun)
- November 16: Unbreak My Heart
- November 17: My Name is Busaba
- November 24: Poong, the Joseon Psychiatrist (season 2)
- December 8: Buck
- December 10: The Voice Generations
- December 15: The Missing Husband
- December 29: Love Before Sunrise

===== Stopped airing =====
Program	Last airing	Resumed airing	Reason
Born to Be Wild	May 7	May 21	Pre-empted by Miss Universe Philippines 2023.
IBilib	May 7	May 21	Pre-empted by Miss Universe Philippines 2023.
Family Feud (4th incarnation)	June 9	October 2	Season break.
Daig Kayo ng Lola Ko	July 2	October 7	Season break.
Born to Be Wild	August 13	August 27	Pre-empted by the Miss Grand Philippines 2023.
IBilib	August 13	August 27	Pre-empted by the Miss Grand Philippines 2023.
Kapuso Mo, Jessica Soho	September 3	September 17	Pre-empted by Secret Slaves: A Jessica Soho Special Report on Human Trafficking.
GMA Blockbusters	December 3	December 24	Pre-empted by the 99th season of National Collegiate Athletic Association.
Regal Studio Presents	December 3	December 24	Pre-empted by the 99th season of National Collegiate Athletic Association.
Cayetano in Action with Boy Abunda	December 24	January 7, 2024	Pre-empted by Kapuso Countdown to 2024.
Queen of Masks	December 29	January 15, 2024	Season break.

==== TV5 ====
The following are programs that ended on TV5:

- January 7: The Brilliant Life
- January 8: From Helen's Kitchen (season 3)
- January 20: Flower of Evil and Mag-Badyet Tayo!
- January 21: Johnny Bravo (rerun)
- January 24: Ang Panday (2016; rerun)
- January 30: Top 20 Funniest (rerun)
- February 3: Camp Lazlo (rerun), Dragons: Race to the Edge (rerun), Moonbug Cartoons (Cocomelon, Go Buster and Little Baby Bum) and Trolls: The Beat Goes On! (rerun)
- February 10: Ever Night: War of Brilliant Splendours and Mars Ravelo's Darna (2022)
- February 19: Everybody, Sing! season 2
- February 25: John en Ellen (season 1; rerun)
- March 4: TikTalks (season 1)
- March 9: Encounter (Philippine adaptation; rerun)
- April 5: Maine Goals (seasons 1 and 2) and Sa Ngalan ng Ina (rerun)
- April 27: Lifetime Original Movies
- April 28: The Great Show
- April 29: Tropang LOL
- May 13: Samurai Jack (rerun)
- May 14: Healing Galing sa TV
- May 19: True Beauty (rerun)
- May 21: The Voice Kids season 5
- June 5: Tomorrow's World
- June 9: The Key of David
- June 16: Bakit Manipis ang Ulap? (rerun), Codename: Kids Next Door (rerun) and Misibis Bay (rerun)
- June 17: Kurdapya and Team A (season 1)
- June 23: Dexter's Laboratory (rerun)
- June 30: It's Showtime
- July 7: For Love or Money (rerun), Star Confessions (rerun) and The Powerpuff Girls (1998; rerun)
- July 9: Foster's Home for Imaginary Friends (rerun) and Uncle Grandpa
- July 16: The Rain In España
- July 21: Cine Cinco and Studio 5 Presents
- July 28: The Tale of Nokdu
- August 11: Masked Singer Pilipinas season 1 (rerun)
- August 19: The Best of Wow Mali
- August 25: Dirty Linen
- September 1: More Than Friends
- September 8: Rolling In It Philippines (season 2; rerun)
- September 29: The Forbidden Flower
- October 7: Team A (season 2)
- October 13: The Iron Heart
- October 15: Kusina ni Mamang and Wanted: Ang Serye (rerun)
- October 20: Minsan pa Nating Hagkan ang Nakaraan (2023)
- October 22: At Your Home with Anthony and Maricel
- October 28: For the Love and Maine Goals (season 3)
- November 4: Cine Cinco Hollywood Edition and Woman in Action
- November 11: Sin vergüenza and The Chiefs
- November 26: My Hero Academia (seasons 1 and 2, rerun)
- December 2: Brillante Mendoza Presents (rerun) and La suerte de Loli
- December 8: Spingo
- December 29: The World of a Married Couple
- December 31: Celebrity Family Feud, Dragons: Race to the Edge (rerun), FPJ: Da King and Trolls: The Beat Goes On! (rerun)

===== Stopped airing =====
Program	Last airing	Resumed airing	Reason
Uncle Grandpa	February 3	May 20	Series break.
Foster's Home for Imaginary Friends (rerun)	February 3	May 21	Series break.
The Chiefs	February 26	October 29	Program was replaced by At Your Home with Anthony and Maricel.
Pinoy Explorer (rerun)	March 11	October 22	Season break.
Frontline sa Umaga	June 16	May 6, 2024	Program used as a segment on Gud Morning Kapatid.
At Your Home with Anthony and Maricel	August 20	September 17	Pre-empted by the 2023 FIBA Basketball World Cup coverage.
TikTalks (season 2)	August 20	September 17	Pre-empted by the 2023 FIBA Basketball World Cup coverage.

=== State-owned networks ===
==== PTV ====
The following are programs that ended on People's Television Network:

- January 6: Bitag Live
- April 22: Saka-Inan
- September 2: Atmosphere of Miracles
- September 15: Public Briefing: #LagingHandaPH and The Chatroom
- December 16: NAPC: Aksyon Laban sa Kahirapan
- December 19: DOST Report
- December 24: Masters of the Game

===== Stopped airing =====
Program	Stopped airing	Resumed airing	Reason
PTV Sports	September 8	October 14	Season break.

==== IBC ====
The following are programs that ended on IBC:

- January 14: DokyuBata TV
- January 29: Agri TV ATBP.: Kasama sa Hanapbuhay and Sabong TV
- April 30: EZ Shop, NCCT Originals and TV Shop Philippines
- July 20: Bagong Barangay ng Mamamayan in Action
- September 8: PTV Sports
- September 15: Public Briefing: #LagingHandaPH

=== Minor networks ===
The following are programs that ended on minor networks:

- January 1: From Now On, Showtime! and Ngayon at Kailanman on All TV
- January 16: INC News World on Net 25
- January 17: Reconnect on Net 25
- January 18: El Mensaje on Net 25
- January 20: A Place in the Sun on Net 25
- January 27: Balitaan at Kamustaan, Balitang Todo Lakas, Dear Ate Juday, IZ Balita Nationwide sa Hapon, IZ Balita Nationwide sa Tanghali, IZ Balita Nationwide sa Umaga, O.R.O. (Obserbasyon, Reaksiyon at Opinyon) sa DWIZ, Ratsada sa Umaga and Serbisyong Lubos sa 882 on IZTV (now Aliw 23)
- January 28: IZ Balita Nationwide Sabado on IZTV (now Aliw 23)
- January 29: IZ Balita Nationwide Linggo on IZTV (now Aliw 23)
- January 31: Woori the Virgin on All TV
- February 17: StorIZ of Love on Aliw 23
- February 25: Lingap sa Mamamayan on Net 25
- March 3: Fatal Promise on Net 25
- March 3: House of Praise on Light TV
- March 5: EZ Shop, Sana Dalawa ang Puso and Why Her? on All TV
- March 17: Radyo Klinika on Aliw 23
- March 19: Miracle on All TV
- April 5: News Night and Wowowin on All TV
- April 9: GoodWill (season 1) on Net 25
- April 14: Pasada Balita on Aliw 23
- April 16: Till I Met You on All TV
- April 23: If You Wish Upon Me on All TV
- April 28: Eyespotted on Aliw 23
- April 30: Hot Mom on All TV
- May 8: Travel Well on Aliw 23
- May 12: Trending Ngayon on Aliw 23
- May 19: Papa, Nasa'n Ka? on SMNI
- May 19: Pulis @ Ur Serbis Aksyong Mabilis on UNTV
- May 20: Echoes of the Heart on Aliw 23
- May 21: Great Lakes of the Philippines and INC News World on Net 25
- June 2: In the Heart of Business on Aliw 23
- June 3: Ano'ng Meron kay Abok? on Net 25
- June 4: River Where the Moon Rises (rerun) on All TV
- June 16: From Now On, Showtime! (rerun) on All TV
- June 18: Woori the Virgin (rerun) on All TV
- June 19: Little Juan's Playlist on Net 25
- June 21: Time to Draw on Net 25
- June 22: Hashtag: New Normal and INC Kids Adventure on Net 25
- June 23: Don't Give Up, Love and Everythaaang and Negosyuniversity on Net 25
- June 30: News Light sa Umaga on Light TV
- July 7: Two Sisters on Net 25
- July 8: Oh My Dad! on All TV
- July 16: Miracle (rerun) and Sandugo on All TV
- July 23: Negosyo Goals (season 1) on All TV
- July 23: Barangay Mirandas on Net 25
- July 27: Ziff O’Clock on Aliw 23
- July 28: Toni on All TV
- July 28: Light Cinema Specials on Light TV
- July 30: J12 Kids on Light TV
- August 4: Again My Life (rerun) and Ngayon at Kailanman (2018; rerun) on All TV
- August 6: GoodWill (season 2) on Net 25
- August 13: If You Wish Upon Me (rerun) on All TV
- September 3: Showbiz sa IZ on Aliw 23
- September 8: IZ Umaga Balita on Aliw 23
- September 8: Mysterious Personal Shopper on Net 25
- September 15: Why Her? (rerun) on All TV
- September 15: Get It Straight with Daniel Razon on UNTV
- September 17: D'X-Man on UNTV
- October 6: Dahil Sa'yo on All TV
- October 8: Doble Kara on All TV
- October 22: Negosyo Goals (season 2) and Sino ang Maysala?: Mea Culpa on All TV
- October 22: TNT: Todong Nationwide Talakayan on Aliw 23
- November 11: 2023 Shakey's Super League Collegiate Pre-Season Championship on Aliw 23
- November 17: From Now On, Showtime! (rerun) and River Where the Moon Rises (rerun) on All TV
- November 19: Precious Hearts Romances Presents: Araw Gabi on All TV
- November 21: Kasosyo TV on Light TV
- November 24: Kızım on Net 25
- December 15: Woori the Virgin (rerun) on All TV
- December 29: Again My Life (rerun) and Miracle (rerun) on All TV
- December 31: Korina Interviews on Net 25
- December 31: TV Shop Philippines on RJ DigiTV

==== Unknown dates ====
- Kingdom Force on SMNI

=== Other channels ===
The following are programs that ended on other channels:

- January 1: Pinoy Samurai on BuKo Channel
- January 6: The Merciless Judge on GTV
- January 6: Doctor John and The Heirs on Heart of Asia
- January 8: Pusong Pinoy sa Amerika (season 17) on GTV
- January 13: Daisy Siete: Tinderella on BuKo Channel
- January 13: Yes, Yes Show! on Cine Mo!
- January 13: Mano Po Legacy: The Flower Sisters on GTV
- January 13: Bad Genius on Heart of Asia
- January 13: Ikaw ay Pag-Ibig (rerun), Katorse (rerun) and The Trapp Family Singers on Jeepney TV
- January 13: Love to Death and Moon Daughters on Telenovela Channel
- January 14: Boy For Rent on GTV
- January 18: Hotseat on One Sports
- January 20: Flower of Evil (rerun) and Remi, Nobody's Girl on Jeepney TV
- January 20: Flower of Evil (rerun) on Kapamilya Channel
- January 20: My Sweet Lie (ETCerye) on SolarFlix
- January 22: Annaliza (rerun) on Jeepney TV
- January 22: PIEnalo Pinoy Games on PIE Channel
- January 27: Love in Sadness (rerun) on Kapamilya Channel
- January 27: HaPinay on TeleRadyo
- January 28: Perfect Morning on One PH
- January 29: Reporter's Notebook and The Big Picture on GTV
- January 29: Oh My Baby (rerun) on Heart of Asia
- February 3: Douluo Continent on Heart of Asia
- February 4: Fear Times and The Worst Witch (season 3) on GTV
- February 5: Rainbow Prince on Heart of Asia
- February 5: Prinsesa ng Banyera (rerun) on Jeepney TV
- February 5: Almost Paradise (season 1; rerun) on Kapamilya Channel
- February 10: Iskul Bukol (rerun) on BuKo Channel
- February 10: Mars Ravelo's Darna (2022) on Cine Mo!
- February 10: Hogu's Love on GTV
- February 10: VIP (rerun) on Heart of Asia
- February 10: Ever Night: War of Brilliant Splendours on Jeepney TV
- February 10: Ever Night: War of Brilliant Splendours and Mars Ravelo's Darna (2022) on Kapamilya Channel
- February 11: PIEgalingan on PIE Channel
- February 12: Dream Maker on Kapamilya Channel
- February 12: Pak! Palong Follow on PIE Channel
- February 16: Usapang SSS on DZRH TV
- February 17: Queen and I and Scarlet Heart (rerun) on Heart of Asia
- February 17: The Better Half (rerun) on Jeepney TV
- February 18: Delayed Justice on GTV
- February 19: Everybody, Sing! season 2 on Kapamilya Channel
- February 24: Maria Clara at Ibarra on GTV and Pinoy Hits
- February 24: Prince of Wolf (rerun) on Heart of Asia
- February 25: Secret Garden (rerun) on Heart of Asia
- March 3: Magkaribal (rerun) on Jeepney TV
- March 3: Wag Po! on One PH
- March 3: Unica Hija on Pinoy Hits
- March 4: TikTalks (season 1) on One PH
- March 4: Ang Pinaka on Pinoy Hits
- March 5: Jackie Chan Adventures (rerun) on GTV
- March 5: Hello From the Other Side on Heart of Asia
- March 5: TikTalks (season 1) on One News
- March 10: Luv Is: Caught in His Arms on GTV, I Heart Movies and Pinoy Hits
- March 10: Princess Hours on Heart of Asia
- March 10: Bridges of Love (rerun) on Jeepney TV
- March 10: On the Wings of Love on PIE Channel
- March 11: Love Alert (rerun) on Heart of Asia
- March 12: Heirs of the Night and Yo-kai Watch (season 3; rerun) on GTV
- March 12: Lie After Lie (rerun) on Heart of Asia
- March 12: The Goodbye Girl on Kapamilya Channel
- March 16: Saksi on GTV
- March 17: Flames of Vengeance on GTV
- March 17: Kahit Puso'y Masugatan (rerun) and Precious Hearts Romances Presents: Kristine (rerun) on Jeepney TV
- March 24: Sidewalk Talk on Hallypop
- March 24: Miss the Dragon on Heart of Asia
- March 24: Got to Believe (rerun) on Jeepney TV
- March 25: Art of the Spirit (rerun) on Heart of Asia
- March 26: News Live on GTV
- March 30: 2023 Premier Volleyball League First All-Filipino Conference on One Sports and One Sports+
- March 31: Anne of Green Gables, Dream Dad (rerun) and Judy Abbott (rerun) on Jeepney TV
- March 31: One News Now: Markets on One News
- March 31: 2023 Spikers' Turf Open Conference on One Sports and One Sports+
- March 31: Dream Maker: Pause and Play on PIE Channel
- April 1: Pop Talk on Pinoy Hits
- April 2: Love Thy Woman on Jeepney TV
- April 2: Beach Bros on Kapamilya Channel
- April 5: Code Name: Yong Pal and One the Woman on Heart of Asia
- April 7: Maine Goals (seasons 1 and 2) on BuKo Channel
- April 14: Hotel del Luna on Kapamilya Channel
- April 14: A Kiss in a Rain (ETCerye) on SolarFlix
- April 15: Travel with Kach on Jeepney TV
- April 16: I Heart PH (season 7) on CNN Philippines
- April 21: Are We Alright? on GTV
- April 22: Romance of Dog and Monkey on Hallypop
- April 22: The Chosen One: Barkadahan on PIE Channel
- April 23: Playful Kiss (rerun) on Heart of Asia
- April 23: My Sunset Girl on Kapamilya Channel
- April 23: PIE Shorts on PIE Channel
- April 28: My Husband in Law on Heart of Asia
- April 28: May Isang Pangarap (rerun) and Momay (rerun) on Jeepney TV
- April 28: The Great Show on Kapamilya Channel
- April 28: Pak na Pak! Palong Follow and PIEnalo (season 3) on PIE Channel
- April 28: The Two Lives of Estela Carrillo (rerun) on Telenovela Channel
- April 29: Tropang LOL on Kapamilya Channel
- April 29: Papa ng Masa and Pera o Bayong (PoB) on PIE Channel
- April 30: Bleach (season 1) and Yo-kai Watch Shadowside on GTV
- April 30: Sa'ng Daang PIEnalo on PIE Channel
- April 30: Silver Screen on CNN Philippines
- May 5: Mga Lihim ni Urduja on GTV and I Heart Movies
- May 5: I Hear Your Voice and Munting Heredera on Heart of Asia
- May 5: Dwarfina, Mga Lihim ni Urduja, Pyra: Babaeng Apoy and Underage on Pinoy Hits
- May 6: Room No. 9 on GTV
- May 6: Kakambal ni Eliana and Reel Time on Pinoy Hits
- May 7: He's Into Her (season 1) on Jeepney TV
- May 12: Bagito (rerun), Ningning (rerun) and The Trapp Family Singers (rerun) on Jeepney TV
- May 13: From the Heart Specials: Girl Detective Park Hae-Sol on Heart of Asia
- May 14: Misis Piggy on Kapamilya Channel
- May 19: Kingmaker: The Change of Destiny on GTV
- May 19: General and I, Me Always You and The Skywatcher on Heart of Asia
- May 19: A Soldier's Heart (rerun) on Kapamilya Channel
- May 19: Radyo5 Balita Pilipinas on One PH
- May 20: Dear SV on CNN Philippines
- May 21: Gokusen (season 1) on GTV
- May 21: The Voice Kids season 5 on Kapamilya Channel
- May 25: The Write One on GTV, I Heart Movies and Pinoy Hits
- May 26: Marco (rerun), My Super D and Playhouse (rerun) on Jeepney TV
- May 27: The Bureau of Magical Things (rerun) on GTV
- May 27: From the Heart Specials: Youth and The Witch's Diner on Heart of Asia
- May 27: Because of You on Pinoy Hits
- May 28: The Sand Princess (rerun) on Heart of Asia
- June 1: Super Laff-In (rerun) on Cine Mo!
- June 1: Dading on Pinoy Hits
- June 2: Parang Kayo Pero Hindi and The Love Trap on GTV
- June 2: Man of Vengeance on Heart of Asia
- June 2: Mi pecado on Telenovela Channel
- June 3: 2023 Shakey's Girls Volleyball Invitational League on CNN Philippines and Solar Sports
- June 3: Hero City Kids Force on Kapamilya Channel
- June 9: Italian Bride on Telenovela Channel
- June 11: Box Yourself (Kids Block) on CNN Philippines
- June 11: KBYN: Kaagapay ng Bayan on Kapamilya Channel and TeleRadyo
- June 16: Hearts on Ice on GTV, I Heart Movies and Pinoy Hits
- June 16: Galema: Anak ni Zuma (rerun) on Jeepney TV
- June 17: Kurdapya and Team A (season 1) on Sari-Sari Channel
- June 18: God of Lost Fantasy (rerun) on Heart of Asia
- June 18: Tara, G! on Kapamilya Channel
- June 18: Rated Korina on One PH
- June 23: The Herbal Master and The Half Sisters on Heart of Asia
- June 23: AraBella on Pinoy Hits
- June 23: Diskarte on TeleRadyo
- June 24: Inday Wanda on BuKo Channel
- June 24: Blacklist on GTV
- June 24: From the Heart Specials: Do I Look Like A Pushover, From the Heart Specials: Ending Like A Flower and Game of Affection (rerun) on Heart of Asia
- June 24: Masha and the Bear, Robocar Poli and You're My Home (rerun) on Jeepney TV
- June 24: Masha and the Bear and Robocar Poli (rerun) on Kapamilya Channel
- June 24: Bida Konsyumer, Kapamilya Journeys of Hope, NegoSHEnte, Omaga-Diaz Reports, Winner sa Life and Your Daily Do's on TeleRadyo
- June 25: Kumu Star Ka!, Local Legends, Tao Po!, The Healing Eucharist and TV Patrol Weekend on TeleRadyo
- June 25: Feelings on One PH
- June 26: Kapamilya Konek on TeleRadyo
- June 27: Good Job on TeleRadyo
- June 29: Kabayan, Sakto and TeleRadyo Balita on Kapamilya Channel
- June 29: ANC, Balita Ngayon, Headline Pilipinas, Kabayan, Kapamilya Daily Mass, Lingkod Kapamilya, On The Spot, Pasada sa TeleRadyo, Playback, Sakto, SRO: Suhestiyon, Reaksyon at Opinyon, TeleRadyo Balita, Tulong Ko, Pasa Mo and TV Patrol on TeleRadyo
- June 30: Klasmeyts on Cine Mo!
- June 30: In Need of Romance 3 and Siesta Fiesta Movies on GTV
- June 30: Prophecy of Love on Heart of Asia
- June 30: Charlotte (rerun) and Little Women II (rerun) on Jeepney TV
- June 30: Pak na Pak! on PIE Channel
- July 1: Bubble Up on Hallypop
- July 2: Daig Kayo ng Lola Ko (season 3) on GTV
- July 2: The Last Empress (rerun) on Heart of Asia
- July 7: Love in the Moonlight and The Romantic Doctor 2 (rerun) on Heart of Asia
- July 7: Ang sa Iyo ay Akin (rerun) and How to Move On in 30 Days on Kapamilya Channel
- July 8: From the Heart Specials: The Taste of Curry on Heart of Asia
- July 8: The Chosen One: Kakatacute (season 2) on PIE Channel
- July 14: Doctor John (rerun) and Mr. Merman (rerun) on Heart of Asia
- July 14: Since I Found You (rerun) on Jeepney TV
- July 15: Siyensikat (season 3) on CNN Philippines
- July 15: Music Bank on Hallypop
- July 15: From the Heart Specials: Best Ending on Heart of Asia
- July 15: Buena Familia on Pinoy Hits
- July 21: Hello, Heart on Kapamilya Channel
- July 21: Corazón Salvaje (rerun) on Telenovela Channel
- July 22: Night Life with Sister L on DZRH TV
- July 22: Tomorrow's Cantabile on GTV
- July 23: Healing Galing and The Key of David on GTV
- July 23: Teen Clash on Kapamilya Channel
- July 24: Saying Goodbye on Kapamilya Channel
- July 28: The Tale of Nokdu on Kapamilya Channel
- July 28: The Chiefs on One News
- July 29: In Time with You (rerun) on Heart of Asia
- July 29: E.A.T. on One PH
- July 30: Gokusen (season 2) and Puppy in My Pocket on GTV
- July 30: 2023 Premier Volleyball League Invitational Conference on One Sports and One Sports+
- August 4: BalitaOnenan! (season 2) and H3O: Ha Ha Ha Over (rerun) on BuKo Channel
- August 4: La Luna Sangre (rerun) and We Will Survive on Jeepney TV
- August 6: Happy ToGetHer (season 3) on Pinoy Hits
- August 11: Daisy Siete: Tabachingching on BuKo Channel
- August 11: My Ambulance on Heart of Asia
- August 11: The Better Half on PIE Channel
- August 11: Adarna on Pinoy Hits
- August 12: Juan dela Cruz (rerun) on Jeepney TV
- August 12: Rhodora X on Pinoy Hits
- August 13: 2023 Shakey's Super League National Invitationals and Chinese by Blood, Filipino by Heart (season 4) on CNN Philippines
- August 13: 2023 Shakey's Super League National Invitationals on Solar Sports
- August 18: About Time and The Red Sleeve on Heart of Asia
- August 18: Sabel (rerun) on Jeepney TV
- August 18: Matching Matching and The SPG Show: Saktong Pang Gabi on PIE Channel
- August 19: Mongolian Barbecue on BuKo Channel
- August 20: Hay, Bahay! on GTV
- August 20: KBS Song Festival on Hallypop
- August 20: Drag You & Me on Kapamilya Channel
- August 20: Para sa All and Shoutout TV on PIE Channel
- August 21: Wow Mali on BuKo Channel
- August 23: A Style For You and Yu Huiyeol's Sketchbook on Hallypop
- August 25: The Return of Superman on Hallypop
- August 25: Signal on Heart of Asia
- August 25: Dirty Linen on Jeepney TV and Kapamilya Channel
- August 25: The Seed of Love on Pinoy Hits
- August 26: Team Yey! Vlogs on Jeepney TV and Kapamilya Channel
- August 27: Dinofroz, GMA Blockbusters and Regal Studio Presents on GTV
- August 27: The Gifted (rerun) on Heart of Asia
- August 27: Alamat on Pinoy Hits
- September 1: Balitanghali and My Forever Sunshine on Heart of Asia
- September 1: Balitanghali on I Heart Movies
- September 1: Hiram na Alaala on Pinoy Hits
- September 1: Sortilegio on Telenovela Channel
- September 2: Blacklist and From the Heart Specials: Ending Again on Heart of Asia
- September 2: Over a Glass or Two on Jeepney TV
- September 2: The Borrowed Wife on Pinoy Hits
- September 3: Tale of the Nine Tailed (rerun) on Heart of Asia
- September 3: Mga Kuwento ng Dilim on PIE Channel
- September 6: Negosyo Atbp. on DZRH TV
- September 8: Voltes V: Legacy on GTV, I Heart Movies and Pinoy Hits
- September 8: Legend of the Blue Sea on Heart of Asia
- September 8: Imortal (rerun) on Jeepney TV
- September 8: Panahon.TV on DZRH TV and One PH
- September 8: Kung Saka-Sakali on PIE Channel
- September 9: Everybody Hapi on BuKo Channel
- September 9: Where Stars Land (rerun) on Heart of Asia
- September 9: Imbestigador and Road Trip (3rd incarnation) on Pinoy Hits
- September 10: Mac and Chiz (rerun) on BuKo Channel
- September 10: The Final Pitch (season 9) on CNN Philippines
- September 10: Simba: The King Lion and The New Legends of Monkey on GTV
- September 10: Two Wives (2014; rerun) and Ysabella (rerun) on Jeepney TV
- September 10: Call Me Tita on Kapamilya Channel
- September 15: FPJ's Batang Quiapo on Cine Mo!
- September 15: Public Briefing: #LagingHandaPH on DZRH TV
- September 15: Erwin Tulfo On Air with Niña Corpuz on Radyo Pilipinas 1 Television
- September 16: From the Heart Specials: Came to Me and Become a Star on Heart of Asia
- September 17: Martin Mystery on GTV
- September 21: Pyra: Babaeng Apoy (rerun) on Pinoy Hits
- September 22: Royal Blood on GTV, I Heart Movies and Pinoy Hits
- September 22: Show Window: The Queen's House on Heart of Asia
- September 22: Got to Believe on PIE Channel
- September 23: TeleRadyo Serbisyo Rewind on TeleRadyo Serbisyo
- September 24: All-Out Sundays, Pan Tau and Piggy Tales on GTV
- September 24: Story of My Life on Kapamilya Channel
- September 29: The Forbidden Flower on Kapamilya Channel
- September 29: Radyo5 Network News on One PH
- September 30: The Gifted: Graduation (rerun) on Heart of Asia
- October 1: Nang Ngumiti ang Langit (rerun) on Jeepney TV
- October 6: Balita Ko on Heart of Asia and I Heart Movies
- October 6: Pusong Ligaw (rerun) on Jeepney TV
- October 7: The Maid on Heart of Asia
- October 7: Team A (season 2) on Sari-Sari Channel
- October 8: I Heart PH (season 8) on CNN Philippines
- October 8: All-Out Sundays and Moon Embracing the Sun (rerun) on Heart of Asia
- October 8: All-Out Sundays and The Voice Generations on I Heart Movies
- October 12: Viva Movie Classics on GTV
- October 13: My Absolute Boyfriend (rerun) on Heart of Asia
- October 13: 24 Oras, Love Before Sunrise and Maging Sino Ka Man (2023) on I Heart Movies
- October 13: Precious Hearts Romances Presents: Los Bastardos (rerun) and The Iron Heart on Jeepney TV
- October 13: The Iron Heart on Kapamilya Channel
- October 13: Abominable and the Invisible City on PIE Channel
- October 15: One Night Steal on Heart of Asia
- October 20: Behind Your Smile, Grazilda, Mundo Mo'y Akin and To Me, It's Simply You on Heart of Asia
- October 20: Dugong Buhay (rerun) and Nathaniel (rerun) on Jeepney TV
- October 20: Be Careful with My Heart on Kapamilya Channel
- October 20: Minsan pa Nating Hagkan ang Nakaraan (2023) on Sari-Sari Channel
- October 20: In Between (ETCerye) on SolarFlix
- October 21: Goin' Bulilit (seasons 1–5; rerun) and Team Yey! on Jeepney TV
- October 21: Goin' Bulilit (seasons 1–5) and Team Yey! on Kapamilya Channel
- October 22: GMA Integrated News Bulletin on Heart of Asia and I Heart Movies
- October 27: It's Your Lucky Day on GTV
- October 27: It's Your Lucky Day, Lastikman (rerun) and My Little Juan (rerun) on Jeepney TV
- October 27: It's Your Lucky Day, Lastikman and My Little Juan on Kapamilya Channel
- October 28: Oh My Baby (rerun) on Heart of Asia
- October 28: Hinahanap-hanap Kita (rerun) on Kapamilya Channel
- October 28: Ilustrado and Little Nanay on Pinoy Hits
- October 28: For the Love on Sari-Sari Channel
- November 3: Maging Sino Ka Man (2023) on GTV and Pinoy Hits
- November 3: Scarlet Heart (rerun) and The Wolf on Heart of Asia
- November 4: Business Matters (season 10) on CNN Philippines
- November 4: Anticipated Sunday Mass from Santuario de San Antonio Parish and Celebrity Top 10 on One PH
- November 5: Sky Castle (rerun) on Heart of Asia
- November 10: Parekoy on Cine Mo!
- November 10: Balita Ko on GTV
- November 10: Mint to Be on Heart of Asia
- November 10: Dolce Amore (rerun) on Jeepney TV
- November 10: The Croods: Family Tree on PIE Channel
- November 10: Balita Ko and Magandang Dilag on Pinoy Hits
- November 10: Marimar (ETCerye) on SolarFlix
- November 11: Front Row on Pinoy Hits
- November 11: 2023 Shakey's Super League Collegiate Pre-Season Championship on Solar Sports and TAP Sports
- November 12: Tara Peeps on DZRH TV
- November 12: Init sa Magdamag (rerun) on Jeepney TV
- November 16: Unbreak My Heart on GTV, I Heart Movies and Pinoy Hits
- November 17: The Penthouse (season 1; rerun) on Heart of Asia
- November 17: Headline Ngayon Express on TeleRadyo Serbisyo
- November 19: NegoSHEnte on Pinoy Hits
- November 24: Ghost Doctor on Heart of Asia
- November 24: Noah (rerun) on Jeepney TV
- November 25: Bagong Umaga on Jeepney TV
- November 26: Sa Sandaling Kailangan Mo Ako (rerun) on Jeepney TV
- November 26: I Am U on Kapamilya Channel
- November 30: Jumong on GTV
- December 1: The Merciless Judge on Heart of Asia
- December 6: One Balita Ngayon on One PH
- December 8: Gokusen (season 1) on Heart of Asia
- December 10: The Voice Generations on GTV and Pinoy Hits
- December 10: Click, Like, Share (season 1; rerun) on Kapamilya Channel
- December 15: My Dear Heart (rerun) on Jeepney TV
- December 15: 2023 Spikers' Turf Invitational Conference on One Sports and One Sports+
- December 15: The Missing Husband on Pinoy Hits
- December 16: 2023 Premier Volleyball League Second All-Filipino Conference on One Sports and One Sports+
- December 17: Sherlock Jr. on Pinoy Hits
- December 21: Maharlika Pilipinas Volleyball Association on One PH
- December 22: The Penthouse (season 2; rerun) and Witch's Love on Heart of Asia
- December 22: News Patrol on Jeepney TV
- December 22: Dragons: The Nine Realms on PIE Channel
- December 28: Dwarfina (rerun) on Pinoy Hits
- December 29: Ghost Fighter (rerun) and Love Before Sunrise on GTV
- December 29: My Love from the Star (rerun) on Heart of Asia
- December 29: 100 Days to Heaven (rerun) and Angelito: Batang Ama (rerun) on Jeepney TV
- December 29: The World of a Married Couple (rerun) on Kapamilya Channel
- December 29: Agenda with Cito Beltran, One Balita Pilipinas (primetime), One News Now: Business, One News Now: Sports and One News Now: World on One News
- December 29: Mag-Badyet Tayo! and One Balita Pilipinas (primetime) on One PH
- December 29: Forevermore, Kadenang Ginto, Ur Da Boss and Watchawin on PIE Channel
- December 29: Love Before Sunrise on Pinoy Hits
- December 29: Shop TV on SolarFlix
- December 29: Teresa on Telenovela Channel
- December 30: Palibhasa Lalake on Cine Mo!
- December 30: Prince of Wolf (rerun) on Heart of Asia
- December 31: Christmas Cartoon Festival Presents (rerun), Dinofroz (rerun) and Puppy in My Pocket (rerun) on GTV
- December 31: Backstreet Rookie (rerun) and EZ Shop on Heart of Asia
- December 31: FPJ: Da King on Kapamilya Channel
- December 31: One Balita Weekend on One News and One PH
- December 31: Mukhang Perya, Playlist, Sinong Manok Mo? and Tamang Hinala on PIE Channel

==== Unknown ====
- Quiet Moments and Usapang Kaperahan on TeleRadyo Serbisyo

==== Stopped airing ====
Program	Channel	Last airing	Resumed airing	Reason
Afternoon Movie Break	GTV	January 31	March 22	Pre-empted by the 98th season of National Collegiate Athletic Association.
Afternoon Movie Break	GTV	September 23	October 19	Pre-empted by the 99th season of National Collegiate Athletic Association.
All-Out Sundays	GTV	February 12	April 2	Pre-empted by the 98th season of National Collegiate Athletic Association.
All-Out Sundays	GTV	April 16	April 30	Pre-empted by the 98th season of National Collegiate Athletic Association.
Viva Movie Classics	GTV	February 16	March 23	Pre-empted by the 98th season of National Collegiate Athletic Association.
Regal Treasures	GTV	February 20	March 20	Pre-empted by the 98th season of National Collegiate Athletic Association.
Sunday's Best	Kapamilya Channel	May 21	June 4	Pre-empted by the Binibining Pilipinas 2023.
In Between	SolarFlix	May 25	June 12	Series break.
Day Off	Pinoy Hits	May 28	August 13	Series break.
Day Off	Pinoy Hits	August 20	December 24	Series break.
Daddy Di Do Du	BuKo Channel	June 30	August 22	Pre-empted by E.A.T.
Daig Kayo ng Lola Ko	Pinoy Hits	July 2	October 7	Season break.
The Boobay and Tekla Show: Tawa is Life	GTV	August 20	December 17	Pre-empted by The Voice Generations.
Balitanghali	GTV / Pinoy Hits	September 1	November 13	Season break.
Kapuso Mo, Jessica Soho	GTV / Pinoy Hits	September 3	September 17	Pre-empted by Secret Slaves: A Jessica Soho Special Report on Human Trafficking.
Saturday Cinema Hits	GTV	September 23	November 25	Pre-empted by the 99th season of National Collegiate Athletic Association.
Bubble Gang	GTV	September 24	February 4, 2024	Pre-empted by Sparkle U.
The Endlings	GTV	September 24	November 26	Pre-empted by the 99th season of National Collegiate Athletic Association.
It's Showtime	GTV / Jeepney TV / Kapamilya Channel	October 13	October 28	Temporary suspension of broadcast for 12-airing days, which was released by the ruling decision of Movie and Television Review and Classification Board.
Christmas Cartoon Festival Presents (rerun)	GTV	January 8	November 5	Season break.
One News Now	One News	December 31	May 20, 2024	Season break.

=== Video streaming services ===
- January 22: Lovely Ladies Dormitory on VivaMax
- January 26: Drag Den on Amazon Prime Video
- February 3: K-Love on Viu
- March 21: Zero Kilometers Away on YouTube (GMA Public Affairs)
- April 14: Iskovery Nights (season 1) on YouTube (Isko Moreno)
- April 16: Sssshhh! on VivaMax
- May 24: The Write One on Viu
- May 26: Teen Clash on iWantTFC
- May 27: Pantaxa: Laiya on VivaMax
- June 10: In My Dreams on Facebook and YouTube (GMA Public Affairs)
- June 25: Sex Hub on VivaMax
- July 2: The Rain In España on Viva One
- July 12: Sparks Camp (season 1) on YouTube (Black Sheep)
- July 21: Drag You & Me on iWantTFC
- August 5: Kuya Dags on YouTube (Blvck Entertainment Production)
- August 6: High on Sex 2 on VivaMax
- August 11: ReTox: 2 Be Continued on YouTube (ABS-CBN Entertainment)
- August 11: Iskovery Nights (season 2) on YouTube (Isko Moreno)
- August 14: Deadly Love on Viva One
- September 17: Secret Campus on VivaMax
- September 24: Kung Hindi Lang Tayo Sumuko on Viva One
- October 4: Drag Race Philippines (season 2) and Drag Race Philippines: Untucked! (season 2) on HBO Go and WOW Presents Plus
- October 5: Comedy Island: Philippines on Amazon Prime Video
- October 29: Halo-Halo X on VivaMax
- November 3: Fractured on iWantTFC and YouTube (iWantTFC)
- November 16: Linlang on Amazon Prime Video
- December 8: Iskovery Nights (season 3) on YouTube (Isko Moreno)
- December 10: Araro on VivaMax
- December 29: Love Before Sunrise on Viu

== Networks ==
The following are a list of free-to-air and cable channels or networks launches and closures in 2023.

=== Launches ===
The following are a list of free-to-air and cable channels or networks launches and closures in 2023.

Date	Station	Type	Channel	Source
January 16	Pinoy Hits	Free-to-air	Channel 15 (digital feed); GMA Affordabox Channel 6	
February 19	SMNI News Channel	Free-to-air	Channel 43 (digital feed)	
April 1	TV5 HD	Cable and satellite	Cignal Channel 15 (Nationwide)	
April 13	MPTV (Media Pilipinas TV)	Cable and satellite	Cignal Channel 98 (Nationwide); SatLite Channel 53 (Nationwide)	
May 19	DZME Radyo TV	Cable and satellite	Cablelink Channel 40 (Metro Manila); Cignal Channel 29 (Nationwide)	
June 26	RTVMalacañang	Free-to-air	Channel 14 (digital feed)	
July 1	Cinemundo Pinoy	Cable and satellite	Converge Vision Channel 31 (Metro Manila); Cignal Channel 48 (Nationwide)	
July 1	SEA Today	Cable and satellite	Converge Vision Channel 101 (Metro Manila); Cignal Channel 138 (Nationwide)	
July 1	Toro TV	Cable and satellite	Converge Vision Channel 64 (Metro Manila)	
August 8	Blast Cinema; Family Movies; Fear; Blast Action; Reality TV; Talk Shows; Showcase Drama; Sports+; Cue; Blast FC; UFC TV; WTA Access; Golf+; Fight Ticket	FAST/linear channel	BlastTV (OTT)	
September 13	Radyo Pilipinas 1 Television	Free-to-air	Channel 14 (digital feed)	
September 18	Studio Universal	FAST/linear channel	BlastTV (OTT)	
October 1	BBC Lifestyle	Cable and satellite	Cignal Channel 202 (HD) (Nationwide)	
October 1	HITS Now	Cable and satellite	Cignal Channel 122 (Nationwide)	
November 1	tvN Movies Pinoy	Cable and satellite	Cignal Channel 39 (Nationwide); SatLite Channel 161 (Nationwide)	

=== Rebranded ===
The following is a list of television stations or cable channels that have made or will make noteworthy network rebrands in 2023.

Date	Rebranded from	Rebranded to	Type	Channel	Source
January 30	IZTV	Aliw 23	Broadcasting network	Channel 23 (digital feed); Sky Cable Channel 72 (Metro Manila); Cignal Channel 24 (Nationwide)	
April 3	BBC World News	BBC News	Cable and Satellite	Cignal Channel 136 (Nationwide); Cablelink Channel 20 (Metro Manila); Sky Cable Channel 29 (Metro Manila)^{1}	
June 30	TeleRadyo	TeleRadyo Serbisyo	Cable and Satellite	Sky Cable Channel 26 (Metro Manila) / Channel 501 (Provincial); Cignal Channel 32 (Nationwide)	
July 28	Boomerang (2nd incarnation)	Cartoonito (2nd incarnation)	Cable and Satellite	Cignal Channel 76 (Nationwide); G Sat Channel 43 (Nationwide); SatLite Channel 80 (Nationwide); Cablelink Channel 27 (Metro Manila); Sky Cable Channel 42 (Metro Manila) / Channel 112 (Provincial)	
August 7	Golden Nation Network	One Media Network (2nd incarnation)	Broadcasting network	Selected terrestrial stations G Sat Channel 1 (Nationwide); Sky Cable Channel 73 (Metro Manila)	

- Notes
1. ^1: until September 24

=== Closures ===
Date	Station	Type	Channel	Sign-on debut	Source
January 1	BabyFirst	Cable and Satellite	Sky Cable Channel 121 (Metro Manila)	October 1, 2014	
January 1	eGG Network	Cable and Satellite	Cignal Channel 99 (Nationwide); Cablelink Channel 40 (Metro Manila)	April 12, 2017	
June 25	PCO TV	Free-to-air	Channel 14 (digital feed)	mid-2018	
September 12	Salaam TV	Free-to-air	Channel 14 (digital feed)	July 3, 2017	
October 1	BabyTV	Cable and Satellite	Sky Cable Channel 122 (Metro Manila)	December 1, 2011	
October 1	Chillayo	Cable and Satellite	Cablelink Channel 314 (HD) (Metro Manila)	October 1, 2021	
October 1	Cinemachi Action	Cable and Satellite	Cablelink Channel 302 (HD) (Metro Manila)	October 1, 2021	
October 1	Cinemachi Docu	Cable and Satellite	Cablelink Channel 61 (Metro Manila)	October 1, 2021	
October 1	Cinemachi Family	Cable and Satellite	Cablelink Channel 48 (Metro Manila)	October 1, 2021	
October 1	Cinemachi Xtra	Cable and Satellite	Cablelink Channel 47 (SD) / Channel 300 (HD) (Metro Manila)	October 1, 2021	
October 1	Homey's	Cable and Satellite	Cablelink Channel 33 (Metro Manila)	October 1, 2021	
October 1	Lolly Kids	Cable and Satellite	Cablelink Channel 204 (Metro Manila)	October 1, 2021	
October 1	National Geographic Asia	Cable and Satellite	Cignal Channel 141 (SD) / Channel 240 (HD) (Nationwide); G Sat Channel 65 (Nationwide) (Nationwide); Sky Cable Channel 41 (SD) / Channel 195 (HD) (Metro Manila) / Channel 204 (SD) / Channel 723 (HD) (Provincial)	January 1, 1994	
October 1	Nat Geo Wild	Cable and Satellite	Cignal Channel 142 (SD) (Nationwide); G Sat Channel 87 (HD) (Nationwide); Sky Cable Channel 66 (SD) / Channel 193 (HD) (Metro Manila) / Channel 211 (SD) / Channel 725 (HD) (Provincial)	August 21, 2006	
October 1	Star Chinese Channel	Cable and Satellite	Sky Cable Channel 95 (Metro Manila)	October 21, 1991	
October 1	Star Chinese Movies	Cable and Satellite	Sky Cable Channel 94 (Metro Manila)	May 1, 1994	
October 1	Sportyfy	Cable and Satellite	Cablelink Channel 54 (SD) / Channel 354 (HD) (Metro Manila)	October 1, 2021	
October 1	Wow!	Cable and Satellite	Cablelink Channel 56 (SD) / Channel 353 (HD) (Metro Manila)	October 1, 2021	
December 23	TV Shop Philippines	Free-to-air	Channel 31 (digital feed)	January 5, 2015	
December 27	DepEd NCR Prime	Free-to-air	Channel 21 (digital feed); Sky Cable Channel 4 (Metro Manila)	September 13, 2021	
December 31	PIE Channel	Broadcasting channel	Channel 31 (digital feed); Sky Cable Channel 21 (Nationwide); Cablelink Channel 100 (Metro Manila); Cignal TV Channel 30 (Nationwide)	May 23, 2022	

=== Stopped broadcasting ===
The following is a list of stations and channels or networks that have stopped broadcasting or (temporarily) off the air in 2023.

Station	Type	Channel	Last broadcasting	Resumed broadcasting	Reason	Source
Pinoy Box Office	Cable and Satellite	Cignal Channel 41 (Nationwide); G Sat Channel 12 (Nationwide); SatLite Channel 31 (Nationwide); Sky Cable Channel 60 (Metro Manila) / Channel 409 (Regional); Cablelink Channel 52 (Metro Manila); Converge Vision Channel 8 (Metro Manila)	August 16	August 18	Temporary off-the-air due to technical audio problems.	

== Services ==
The following are a list of television operators or providers and streaming media platforms or services launches and closures in 2023.

=== Launches ===
Date	Provider	Type	Stream	Source
January 29	Viva Prime	VOD OTT streaming media platform	N/A	
June 27	Pilipinas Live	VOD OTT streaming media platform	N/A	
August 8	Blast TV	VOD OTT streaming media platform	N/A	
September 18	Studio Universal	VOD OTT streaming media platform	N/A (via BlastTV)	

=== Rebranded ===
The following is a list of streaming providers that have made or will make noteworthy service rebrands in 2023.

Date	Rebranded from	Rebranded to	Type	Stream	Source
February 25	Viva Prime	Viva One	VOD OTT streaming media	N/A	
November 3	Tap Go	BlastTV	VOD OTT streaming media	N/A	

=== Closures ===
Date	Provider	Type	Stream	Sign-on debut	Source
April 27	Discovery+	VOD OTT streaming media platform	N/A	October 13, 2021	

== Deaths ==
February

- February 17 – Maurice Arcache (b. 1934), veteran lifestyle columnist and co-host of Oh No! It's Johnny!

March

- March 24 – Andrei Sison (b. 2005), actor
- March 29 – Angela Perez (b. 1968), actress

April

- April 19 – Ed Picson (b. 1953), sports broadcaster

June

- June 3 – John Regala (b. 1965), actor
- June 8 – Florence Paytocan (b. 1997), regional news reporter of PTV Cordillera
- June 15 – Patrick Guzman (b. 1967), former actor

July

- July 5 –
  - Mario Dumaual (b. 1958), entertainment correspondent, ABS-CBN
  - Nap Gutierrez (b. 1960), entertainment news personality and sports columnist
- July 7 – Amando Doronila (b. 1928), journalist
- July 16 – Ricky Rivero (b. 1972), actor, filmmaker
- July 25 – Kennedy Nakar (b. 1999), actor
- July 26 – Willie Nepomuceno (b. 1948), actor, comedian, impersonator, satirist

August

- August 3 – JM Canlas (b. 2006), former cast member of Team Yey!, actor, athlete, musician, singer, debater, gamer
- August 7 – Clyde Mercado (b. 1970), senior assistant vice president, GMA Network
- August 10 – Robert Arevalo (b. 1938), actor
- August 17 – Angie Ferro (b. 1937), actress
- August 23 – Magdalena "Moodie Jam" Estrada (b. 1957), disc jockey
- August 29 – Mike Enriquez (b. 1951), radio and television news anchor, GMA Network

September

- September 10 – Ethel Ramos (b. 1936), talent manager and veteran entertainment columnist
- September 25 – Jay de Castro (b. 1977), former voice actor and dubbing director of ABS-CBN, former TV reporter of News5 and radio reporter of DZME 1530 Radyo Uno
- September 28 – Lourdes "Deedee" Siytangco (b. 1940), spokesperson of former President Cory Aquino

October

- October 4 – Heart Uy (b. 2004), UPeepz dance crew member
- October 16 – Lulu Pascual (b. 1956), former news anchor of IBC and RPN
- October 18 – Jaymee Joaquin (b. 1979), TV host and actress
- October 25 – Jose "DJ Richard" Enriquez Jr. (b. 1964), disc jockey
- October 29 – Joey Paras (b. 1978), actor and comedian

November

- November 5 – Juan Jumalon (b. 1966), journalist
- November 6 – Conrado de Quiros (b. 1951), journalist
- November 12 – Rina Jimenez-David (b. 1955), journalist
- November 15 – Jograd dela Torre (b. 1960), singer-comedian
- November 18 – Ray Butch Gamboa (b. 1947), veteran motoring journalist, columnist and host of Auto Focus, Business and Leisure and Motoring Today
- November 27 – Regi Espiritu (b. 1969), journalist for DZRH
- November 29 – Sammy Manese (b. 2005), internet personality

December

- December 1 – Manolo Favis (b. 1939), radio broadcaster
- December 2 – Jun Urbano (b. 1939), actor and comedian
- December 6 – Gil Soriano (b. 1941), director
- December 8 – Kokoi Baldo (b. 1979), reggae singer
- December 17 – Ronaldo Valdez (b. 1947), actor
- December 23 – Samboy Lim (b. 1962), basketball player
- December 29 – Gregorio Bacit Jr., (b. 1975), cameraman for PTV

== See also ==
- 2023 in television
