= Maine Goals =

Philippine Television Show

- Title card
- Genre: Travel; Lifestyle
- Created by: APT Entertainment; Cignal TV
- Written by: Clarence Jovito
- Directed by: Kiko Meily
- Presented by: Maine Mendoza; Chamyto Aguedan; Chi Chirita
- Country of origin: Philippines
- Original language: Tagalog

Production
- Camera setup: Multiple-camera setup
- Running time: 30 minutes

Original release
- Network: BuKo Channel
- Release: August 2, 2021 – October 27, 2023

Maine Goals (stylized as #MaineGoals) is a Philippine travel and lifestyle show broadcast by the BuKo Channel. It is hosted by Maine Mendoza. It premiered on August 2, 2021. Maine Goals featured different places in the country and discovered tourist spots and the culture of the locals.
