= Emojination (game show) =

Philippine television game show

- Title card
- Genre: Game show
- Written by: Reeza Belo
- Directed by: Noel Cabacungan
- Presented by: Maja Salvador
- Country of origin: Philippines
- Original language: Tagalog
- No. of seasons: 5

Production
- Executive producer: Memot Navarro
- Producer: Jinky Tabason
- Running time: 60 minutes
- Production companies: APT Entertainment; MQuest Ventures

Original release
- Network: TV5
- Release: May 14, 2023 – September 6, 2025

Emojination is a Philippine television game show broadcast by TV5. Originally hosted by Maja Salvador and Awra Briguela, it aired on the network's Weekend Trip line up from May 14, 2023 to May 11, 2024. The show returned from May 17, 2025 to September 6, 2025. It is also available for streaming online on Cignal Play and YouTube. Salvador, Chamyto Aguedan and Chad Kinis served as the final hosts.

== Format and gameplay ==
Emojination is an original Filipino game show that deciphers emoji questions and answers questions related to emoji puzzles.

== Hosts ==
- Maja Salvador (2023–2025)
- Chamyto Aguedan (2023–2025)
- Chad Kinis (2025)

== Former hosts ==
- Awra Briguela (2023)
- Miles Ocampo (2023–24)

== Accolades ==
Accolades received by Emojination
Year	Award	Category	Recipient	Result	Ref.
2024	28th Asian Television Awards	Best Quiz or Game Show Host	Maja Salvador	Won	
