= 2021 in Philippine television =

The following is a list of events affecting Philippine television in 2021. Events listed include television show debuts, finales, cancellations, and channel launches, closures and rebrandings, as well as information about controversies and carriage disputes.

== Events ==
=== January ===
- January 1
  - After past six years of broadcasting in the Philippines, Disney XD has ceased its operations by Disney Branded Television (a unit of Disney General Entertainment Content owned by The Walt Disney Company) across Southeast Asia due to a review of Disney's business direction and the upcoming launch of their own streaming service in the region.
  - Sky Cable terminated GINX Esports TV and Stingray Classica on its line-up due to the expiration of Sky's contract with the said networks. GINX Esports TV continued to air via Cignal and G Sat under the distribution by Mediahouse/Club TV (under Mimyuni Media Entertainment from Kick Media) and SES, while Stingray Classica continued to air via G Sat and selected nationwide cable operators.
  - Celestial Movies Pinoy celebrated its 5th anniversary of broadcasting on cable and satellite television.
  - TV Maria celebrated its 15th anniversary of broadcasting.
- January 2 – Cignal terminated eight Fox Networks Group (a subsidiary of The Walt Disney Company) channels: Channel V, Fox Crime, Fox Family Movies, Fox News Channel, Fox Sports 3, FX, Nat Geo People and Star Chinese Channel, on its line-up due to the expiration of Cignal's contract with the company. Meanwhile, ten Disney/Fox channels continued to air on their line-up until eight of them ceased operations nine months later.
- January 4
  - Cignal launched eleven channels on their line-up: Aniplus, Blue Ant Extreme, Jeepney TV, Knowledge Channel, K-Plus, Metro Channel, Nick Jr., Paramount Network (branded from Paramount Channel as prior to the announced February 1 rebranding), TAP Edge, TAP Sports and Telenovela Channel.
- January 15 – Sari-Sari Channel celebrated its 5th anniversary of broadcasting on cable and satellite television.
- January 21 – CNN Philippines (via CNN International), One News, and both TAP Edge and TAP TV (via NBC News), as well as other international news channels (including BBC World News, Bloomberg Television, CNBC Asia, CNA and Fox News) aired the special coverage of the Inauguration of Joe Biden live from Washington, D.C.
- January 24 – ABS-CBN Corporation and PLDT's Beneficial Trust Fund (MediaQuest Holdings through TV5 Network, Inc. and Cignal TV), in collaboration with Brightlight Productions, began a partnership agreement to air Sunday noontime variety show and afternoon movie block via TV5.
- January 29 – VivaMax made its official launched after a month and 14 days of being in soft operations on December 15, 2020.

=== February ===
- February 1 – Comedy Central (after past seven years of broadcasting in the Philippines) and MTV China have ceased its operations by ViacomCBS across Southeast Asia. In addition, Paramount Channel Asia rebranded as Paramount Network Asia.
- February 4 – MediaQuest Holdings, through Cignal TV announced a 3-year deal with the Premier Volleyball League to aired the games beginning with the 4th season (17th overall season for the former Shakey's V-League) One Sports, One Sports+, Cignal Play and Smart Gigafest. This is the second league organized by Sports Vision to broadcast on Cignal and One Sports (the first one being Spikers' Turf since 2018). This also the third time that the volleyball league games broadcast on the company since 2005–2006 on ABC-5 (now TV5; under Associated Broadcasting Company, now TV5 Network, Inc.) and 2012–2013 on Hyper (now One Sports+; under MediaQuest) both as the Shakey's V-League, and marked the end of its stint with ABS-CBN Corporation following the non-renewal of its congressional franchise on July 10, 2020, and the dissolution of ABS-CBN Sports division to close its business operations on August 31, 2020.
- February 6 – JM Yosures of Taguig proclaimed as Tawag ng Tanghalan Year 4 Grand Champion on It's Showtime.
- February 7 – GMA Network launched "GMA Now", a digital TV dongle for Android smartphones.
- February 10 – G Sat terminated four Mediahouse/Club TV (under Mimyuni Media Entertainment from Kick Media) and SES channels: GINX Esports TV, Health & Wellness, Luxe & Life and Pet & Pal, as well as four other channels: Amazing Discoveries TV, Fight COVID-19 (information channel), Sonlife Broadcasting Network and Stingray Classica on its line-up due to the revamping of the provider's channel space assignments. Meanwhile, two Mediahouse/Club TV (under Mimyuni Media Entertainment from Kick Media) and SES channels: Motorvision TV and My Cinema Europe, continued to air on their line-up. In addition, G Sat launched eight channels on their line-up: Da Vinci Kids, DreamWorks Channel, Myx, Paramount Network, TAP Edge, TAP Sports, TAP TV and Travel Channel, as well as two returned channels: Aniplus and K-Plus.
- February 12 – The Healing Eucharist celebrated its 15th anniversary on Philippine television.
- February 14 – My Only Radio rebranded to "MOR Entertainment", transitioned to a new media (online) entity network from a broadcast terrestrial radio network via multiple digital platforms on Facebook, iWantTFC, Kumu, Spotify and YouTube.
- February 20
  - Sky Cable terminated Life TV on its line-up due to the expiration of Sky's contract with the network. Meanwhile, the network continued to air via BEAM TV until its closure on June 1, 2025.
  - Abby Trinidad was hailed as the MNL48's third-generation center girl in the girl group's third general election held on It's Showtime.
- February 22 – GMA News TV rebranded to GTV (which is also the 2nd incarnation of the same name after it used as an Channel 4 frequency from 1974 to 1980), a secondary channel for news, entertainment and sports content in lieu with their parent network. Prior to the rebranding announcement on February 9 by GMA Network, Inc., GMA News TV increased generalist content (similar to the former Citynet Television and Q) since September 2020 where news and public affairs content were decreased as a result of the COVID-19 pandemic. GTV's programming include the upcoming NCAA Philippines (where GMA Network sealed a 5-year deal with the league on November 21, 2020, which led the reason behind the network's rebranding) and GMA News TV's current and existing programming such as weekly public affairs series and newscasts–including Balitanghali, State of the Nation, GMA Regional TV Weekend News (later dropped the "GMA" moniker as Regional TV Weekend News), GMA Regional TV Strip (later dropped the "GMA" moniker as Regional TV Strip), Dobol B sa News TV (later renamed as Dobol B TV), News TV Live (later dropped the "TV" word as News Live) and the simulcast of 24 Oras (for weeknight and later weekend editions), along with movie blocks, Asianovelas and animated series. Following the rebranding of the domestic network to its current name, the News TV brand continued to use through its international version.
- February 28 – Dobol B TV, iJuander, News Live and State of the Nation celebrated its 10th anniversary on Philippine television.

=== March ===
- March 1 – Light TV celebrated its 10th anniversary of broadcasting.
- March 5 – Lopez Holdings Corporation (ABS-CBN Corporation) and PLDT's Beneficial Trust Fund (MediaQuest Holdings through Cignal TV and TV5 Network, Inc.) extended their partnership agreement for the airing of weeknight primetime shows produced and distributed from ABS-CBN Entertainment through TV5 that began on March 8.
- March 6 – Good News celebrated its 10th anniversary on Philippine television.
- March 8 – TV5 unveiled a new relaunched slogan entitled TV5 TodoMax and a revamped programming grid that divided into five blocks: TodoMax Kids (cartoons and kids-oriented), TodoMax Serbisyo (public service), TodoMax Panalo (weekday noontime and afternoon line-up), TodoMax Primetime (later renamed as TodoMax Primetime Singko; weeknight primetime line-up) and TodoMax Weekend (weekend line-up).
- March 10 – The Maharlika Pilipinas Basketball League has resumed their play after almost a year due to the COVID-19 pandemic in the Philippines and the ABS-CBN franchise renewal controversy (which led the closure of its sports division) to finish off the 2019–20 season in a bubble setup in the Subic Bay Freeport Zone, with the games being aired on A2Z, iWantTFC and TFC.
- March 14 – Liofer Pinatacan of Zamboanga del Sur was hailed as the winner of Pinoy Big Brother: Connect.
- March 16 – CNN Philippines implemented a lay off program covering some of its employees due to COVID-19 pandemic in the Philippines.
- March 17
  - People's Television Network temporary stopped its broadcast and limited its programming through online to allow the disinfection of its studios in Quezon City. Their Twitter account posted a controversial tweet about the attacking of President Rodrigo Duterte with the hashtag #DutertePalpak and the mention of the South Korean boyband group BTS, causing the president pertained to the COVID-19 pandemic as a "small thing in our lives". The network later apologized and filed for an investigation against the mastermind behind the said tweet.
  - ABS-CBN Entertainment and WeTV iflix signed a multi-year partnership to air early access of ABS-CBN's primetime shows on the partners' two streaming services starting on March 20.
- March 22 – Four GMA News (Balitanghali, Saksi, State of the Nation and Unang Hirit) became the newest addition of newscasts to incorporate simultaneous sign language interpretation for the deaf and hard of hearing on its broadcast, as well as the online livestream on YouTube being converted to high definition.
- March 29–31 – In protocol response to the emerge wake on the threat surge of uprising COVID-19 cases in the Philippines and the restrictions caused by the second Enhanced Community Quarantine in Greater Manila Area due to the wave of virus mutations in different variants, It's Showtime and Eat Bulaga! cancelled the productions of their annual "Lenten Drama Specials" for the second year. The former aired replays since their second suspension was on March 18, while the latter replaced with the filmed pre-produced episodes before the start of the second lockdown.
- March 31 - TV Maria has switched its airing of aspect ratio format quality on the channel feed and its programming to high-definition (16:9) as being converted its mitigation of reception through digital signal reception through free TV and other cable and satellite providers after 15 years and 3 months on the usage of broadcast video picture resolution that migrated from standard-definition (4:3).

=== April ===
- April 1–3
  - GTV revived its Holy Week special programming every Easter Triduum, after 10 years since GMA News TV never used this practice in 2011.
  - Solar Entertainment Corporation announced a 3-day break on four digital free-to-air and pay TV channels: ETC, Front Row Channel, Solar Learning and Solar Sports, in observance of Holy Week. Meanwhile, Shop TV continued to air on pay TV platforms.
  - The English-language ABS-CBN News Channel along with simultaneous telecast of TeleRadyo aired a special Holy Week programming as prior to the surge of COVID-19 cases in the Philippines since last year.
  - The Healing Eucharist aired its special liturgical masses during the Paschal Triduum for this year. The Holy Week Masses was filmed on the ABS-CBN Chapel, instead from the normal studio used in the past years, and it was broadcast simultaneously for three days on cable TV via Kapamilya Channel, online via Kapamilya Online Live and iWantTFC, and on free-to-air via A2Z (where the network has a right of first refusal to carry as part of a programming agreement with ABS-CBN Corporation along with SVD-Mission Communications Foundation's "Seven Last Words", due to the Jesus Is Lord Church Worldwide's ownership). Meanwhile, Jeepney TV continued to carry on a delay basis.
- April 2
  - SVD-Mission Communications Foundation's "Seven Last Words" returned for pre-recorded this year, after the 2020 edition was cancelled due to the COVID-19 pandemic in the Philippines and the ABS-CBN franchise renewal controversy (which caused their television networks to shutdown), and it was broadcast simultaneously on cable TV via Kapamilya Channel, online via Kapamilya Online Live and iWantTFC, and on free-to-air via A2Z (MCFI's director Fr. Bel San Luis later acknowledged Jesus Is Lord Church Worldwide and ZOE Broadcasting Network founder Eddie Villanueva during the special program's closing message, as the church's channel ownership also refused to carry Catholic liturgical masses during the Paschal Triduum due to their programming agreement with ABS-CBN Corporation). Meanwhile, Jeepney TV continued to air on a delay basis.
  - The Dominican Fathers of the Philippines' "Siete Palabras" was pre-recorded again for the second year filmed at the Santo Domingo Church in Quezon City and other locations affiliated with the Dominican Fathers throughout Luzon (including the University of Santo Tomas in Manila and the Minor Basilica of Our Lady of the Rosary of Manaoag in Manaoag, Pangasinan) due to the COVID-19 pandemic in the Philippines, and it was broadcast on television via GMA Network (selected GMA Regional TV stations in Visayas and Mindanao were pre-empted and replaced with their own local versions) for the 13th year and on radio via Radyo Veritas in Metro Manila as well as other Catholic Media Network affiliated stations nationwide.
- April 3
  - APT Entertainment cancelled the productions of their annual "Black Saturday Lenten Drama Special" for the second year due to the COVID-19 pandemic in the Philippines, which was supposed to air on GMA Network. In lieu of the special, the network replaced by the marathon of First Yaya.
  - Jesuit Communications Foundation Holy Week Specials returned for productions after a year of absence due to the COVID-19 pandemic in the Philippines, with "Fiesta: Ang Makulay na Pananampalatayang Pilipino" as this year's theme. It also marks the first JESCOM Holy Week special to broadcast on GMA Network, ending its 15-year stint with ABS-CBN Corporation following the non-renewal of its congressional franchise on July 10, 2020, and the first JESCOM special to be aired on the said network after 5 years since "Mabuhay Lolo Kiko" in 2015 (GMA replaced from the planned Stations of the Cross with Pope Francis in Vatican City for the second year due to the COVID-19 pandemic in Vatican City).
- April 5
  - GMA Network launched its brand new movie channel on digital terrestrial television, I Heart Movies.
  - Cignal launched five channels on their line-up: CinemaWorld, Fight Sports, GEM, TechStorm and WakuWaku Japan.
- April 9–11 – GTV became the official broadcaster of the 191st General Conference of the Church of Jesus Christ of Latter-Day Saints on national free-to-air (analog and digital) and cable TV via satellite delay from the Conference Center in Salt Lake City, Utah, making the second time the channel aired the conference.
- April 12 – Intercontinental Broadcasting Corporation temporarily suspended their network produced programs as prior to its limited broadcasting hours which only airs DepEd TV every Monday to Saturday at 7:00 am to 7:00 pm and several programs produced by blocktimers on Sunday at 7:00 am to 10:00 am due to limited programming redundancies and the "quarantine safety protocol issues". Their regular programming schedule line-up and broadcasting hours resumed its Sunday schedule on April 25, the Weekday schedule on May 3, and the Saturday schedule on May 8.
- April 18 – Magandang Buhay celebrated its 5th anniversary on Philippine television.
- April 28 – Newsline Philippines, an independent regional news outlet and media organization bureau service based in Davao under Altheni Advertisement and Consultants founded in 2016, expanded into a television channel as it broadcast via selected key areas in the Philippines.
- April 29 – GMA Network and IQiyi sealed a multi-year deal to air GMA's entertainment programs on the latter's streaming service.

=== May ===
- May 1
  - The ABS-CBN News Channel celebrated its 25th anniversary of broadcasting on cable and satellite television.
  - Sky Cable terminated Fight Sports on its line-up due to the expiration of Sky's contract with the network. Meanwhile, the network continued to air via Cignal and G Sat.
  - Jacob Plaza was hailed as the first Ultimate Kantrabahador Grand Champion on Lunch Out Loud's Kantrabaho.
- May 2 – News Light celebrated its 10th anniversary on Philippine television.
- May 3 – After two years of broadcasting, One Media Network was rebranded as Golden Nation Network.
- May 8 – Jehramae Trangia of Cebu was hailed as the winner of the second season of Born to Be a Star.
- May 15 – Maalaala Mo Kaya celebrated its 30th anniversary on Philippine television.
- May 20 – TV5 unveiled a new slogan, station ID or theme jingle entitled Iba sa 5 and a remodify-colored of the current 2019 logo (which is almost similar to the former 2004–2008 slogan of its predecessor, ABC entitled Iba Tayo! and the color scheme of its sister companies, Cignal and PLDT).
- May 24 – SMNI News Channel celebrated its 5th anniversary of broadcasting.
- May 28 – Jessie Pascua (also known as "The Ihaws of Us") of Bulacan was hailed as Versus 1st Grand Champion on It's Showtime.
- May 30 – Singer Klarisse de Guzman of Makati (impersonated as Patti LaBelle) was proclaimed the grand winner of the third season of Your Face Sounds Familiar.

=== June ===
- June 1 – Sky Cable terminated Miao Mi on its line-up due to the expiration of Sky's contract with the network. In addition, Fight Sports returned its broadcast after a month-long termination also due to the provider's expired contract.
- June 5 – G Sat terminated Aniplus and K-Plus on its line-up due to the revamping of the provider's channel space assignments. Meanwhile, both networks continued to air via Cignal, Sky Cable and Cablelink. In addition, G Sat launched Arirang TV and KBS World on their line-up.
- June 6 – Vianna Ricafranca of Albay was emerged as the winner of Centerstage.
- June 12 – PCSO, PIA and Office of the Press Secretary (OPS) launched their Lupang Hinirang MTV respectively (which also aired on TV5, IBC and One Sports) has switched its airing of aspect ratio format quality on the channel feed to widescreen format (16:9) as being converted its mitigation of reception through analog and digital signal reception through free TV and other cable and satellite providers after more than 18 years (for TV5 and IBC) and after almost 9 years (for One Sports) on the usage of broadcast video picture resolution that migrated from fullscreen format (4:3).
- June 13 – ABS-CBN Corporation celebrated its 75th anniversary of original establishment in 1946.
- June 19 – Dean Gales was hailed as the Dance-Off Champion on Lunch Out Loud's Dance Entertainment.
- June 20 – Sky Cable launched Loveworld Asia on their line-up.
- June 28 – TeleRadyo has switched its airing of aspect ratio format quality on the channel feed and its programming to high-definition (16:9) as being converted its mitigation of reception through Sky Cable and other cable providers, iWantTFC, TFC IPTV, and other digital platforms after 14 years and two months on the usage of broadcast video picture resolution that migrated from standard-definition (4:3).
- June 30 – Selected ABS-CBN contents from local programming titles such as originals, movies and series, acquired international distributions, and live channels on iWantTFC and WeTV offered free access with an optional monthly premium subscription of binge-watch to users.

=== July ===
- July 1
  - GMA Network's third international channel GMA News TV International will celebrate its 10th anniversary on global television.
  - TV5's international channels Kapatid Channel and AksyonTV International will celebrate its 10th anniversary on global television.
  - After past nine years of broadcasting in the Philippines, Red by HBO has ceased its operations by Home Box Office, Inc. (operated as a unit of WarnerMedia) across Asia due to lack of advertisements, as well as change in business direction. In addition, HBO Go also removed Asian films from the service, as would focus on Hollywood movies and series.
  - Cablelink launched CGTN Documentary on their line-up.
  - Cignal and SatLite launched two channels on their line-up: Cinema One and Myx.
- July 3 – The Wednesday Group was hailed as the Group Dance Champions on Lunch Out Loud's Dance Entertainment.
- July 8 – Dateline Philippines celebrated its 25th anniversary on Philippine television.
- July 10 – Captivating Kitkat was hailed as the LOL Drag Queen Supreme on Lunch Out Loud's Drag Queendom.
- July 11 – TV5's International channels, Kapatid Channel and AksyonTV International celebrated its 10th anniversary on global television.
- July 16 – UNTV celebrated its 20th anniversary of broadcasting.
- July 18 – PBA Rush celebrated its 5th anniversary of broadcasting on cable and satellite television.
- July 23 – August 8 – The 2020 Summer Olympics was held in Tokyo, Japan after a year of announced postponement on March 24, 2020, due to the COVID-19 pandemic in Japan. On June 11, MediaQuest Holdings (Cignal TV and TV5 Network, Inc.) and their sister companies PLDT–Smart Communications awarded the local rights to the annual games as part of a deal with the Philippine Olympic Committee which aired on TV5, One Sports, One Sports+, Cignal Play and Smart Gigafest. It also marked both the fifth overall consecutive games of TV5/Cignal and the third consecutive summer games of MediaQuest (which introduced for the 2012 Summer Olympic Games co-shared with Solar Entertainment Corporation), ever-record for a Philippine broadcasting company. Although the International Olympic Committee stated to be held as schedule, postponement of the Summer Olympics to the following year was made in March 2020 with its new opening and closing ceremony date range were announced on March 30, 2020.
- July 28 – Converge ICT, in partnership with Pacific Kabelnet (an affiliate cable company), formally launched its internet protocol television service, Vision.

=== August ===
- August 1 –
  - After nine years and sixteen days, Viva TV reverted to Viva Cinema, after the former transitioned to Viva Entertainment's television production arm unit while the latter returned its broadcast operations as the third incarnation channel featuring archived movies and concerts.
- August 2 – Cignal TV, in partnership with APT Entertainment, formally launched its first local comedian channel on Philippine television, Buhay Komedya (BuKo) Channel.
- August 23 – TeleRadyo temporarily suspended the productions of its programming and replaced by the ABS-CBN News Channel–simulcast programs due to the safety precautions of COVID-19 protocols. Later, the channel's regular programming were resumed the following day.
- August 24 – September 5 – The 2020 Summer Paralympics was held in Tokyo, Japan after a year of announced postponement on March 24, 2020, due to the COVID-19 pandemic in Japan. TAP Digital Media Ventures Corporation awarded the local rights to the annual games which aired on TAP Sports and TAP Go.

=== September ===
- September 1
  - Sky Cable terminated tvN on its line-up due to the expiration of Sky's contract with the network. Meanwhile, the network continued to air via Cignal and other cable and satellite providers.
  - Rock Entertainment Holdings rebranded two pay TV channels previously owned by Blue Ant Media: Blue Ant Entertainment to Rock Entertainment and Blue Ant Extreme to Rock Extreme.
- September 8 – Cignal TV, in partnership with University Athletic Association of the Philippines, formally launched its collegiate sports channel on Philippine television, UAAP Varsity Channel.
- September 10 – TV5 Network, Inc. formally launched its digital terrestrial television brand, Sulit TV.
- September 13 – DepEd-NCR Prime was launched as a supplementary digital educational channel catered for Kindergarten to Grade 3 students owned by Solar Entertainment Corporation (under Solar Learning) in partnership with the Department of Education (under DepEd TV).
- September 14 – ABS-CBN Corporation celebrated its 35th anniversary of re-establishment following the People Power Revolution.
- September 16 – ABS-CBN Corporation and Globe Telecom's Group Retirement Fund (Bethlehem Holdings, Inc. through Broadcast Enterprises and Affiliated Media) signed a partnership deal to broadcast an ABS-CBN owned educational channel via BEAM TV (through its digital TV channel frequency on a dedicated subchannel) in nationwide areas beginning on October 5.
- September 18
  - Reiven Umali of Cavite was hailed as Tawag ng Tanghalan Year 5 Grand Champion on It's Showtime.
  - Jesus Is Lord Church Worldwide (ZOE Broadcasting Network) and Philippine Collective Media Corporation entered a partnership agreement for affiliation to broadcast A2Z by airing its programming including from ABS-CBN Entertainment and network-produced programs via Channel 12 (PCMC's owned TV frequency through digital subchannel of PRTV) in selected parts of Eastern Visayas.

=== October ===
- October 1
  - All pay television operators and providers in the Philippines have added or terminated a number of various channels and networks on their respective listing line-ups.
    - Cablelink terminated Baby TV, Fox News and National Geographic Asia on its line-up due to the expiration of Cablelink's contract with the said networks. Baby TV continued to air via Sky Cable until its closure on October 1, 2023; Fox News continued to air via G Sat and Sky Cable; and National Geographic Asia continued to air via Cignal, G Sat and Sky Cable until its closure on October 1, 2023. In addition, Cablelink launched 21 channels on their line-up: Asian Food Network, Chillayo, Cinemachi Action, Cinemachi Docu, Cinemachi Family, Cinemachi Xtra, Discovery Asia, Eurosport, Health & Wellness, HGTV, Homey's, Lolly Kids, Luxe & Life, Motorvision TV, Pet & Pal, Planet Fun, Rock Extreme, Sportyfy, Travelxp, Wow! and ZooMoo.
    - Cignal terminated Shop TV on its line-up due to the expiration of Cignal's contract with the network. Meanwhile, the network continued to air via the digital subchannel of Channel 21 in Metro Manila, Sky Cable (until March 20, 2024) and other cable providers until its closure on July 12, 2026.
    - Fourteen Disney/Fox/Star linear channels in the Philippines (Channel V, Disney Channel, Disney Junior, Fox, Fox Action Movies, Fox Crime, Fox Family Movies, Fox Life, Fox Movies, Fox Sports, Fox Sports 2, Fox Sports 3, FX and Nat Geo People) along with four other channels (SCM Legend, Star Movies China, Star Sports 1 and Star Sports 2) have ceased its operations by The Walt Disney Company (under Disney Branded Television, a unit of Disney General Entertainment Content and Fox Networks Group, a subsidiary of Disney International Operations) in most of Asia across Hong Kong, mainland China, South Korea and Southeast Asia (leaving the broadcast feeds from a few Asian territories across India and parts of East Asia including Japan where only for some selected networks in Asia-Pacific region) due to the company's shifted focus on its direct-to-consumer business model of online streaming service upon the launch in favor of both Disney+ and Disney+ Hotstar in the region on November 17, 2022. Meanwhile, four remaining owned channels (National Geographic Asia, Nat Geo Wild, Star Chinese Channel and Star Chinese Movies) along with four non-owned channels (Baby TV, Fox News, Star Gold and StarPlus) continued to air in the countries of pan-Asia, until five of them ceased operations on October 1, 2023.
    - After 12 years of broadcasting, Global Pinoy Cinema has ceased its operations by Global Satellite Technology Services due to permanent discontinuation of its broadcast operations and repetitive airing of local film libraries, as well as lack of programming redundancies.
    - TAP Digital Media Ventures Corporation launched a TAP Sports' secondary sports channel; Premier Sports; as well as two movie channels; TAP Action Flix and TAP Movies.
- October 5 – Knowledge Channel resumed its free-to-air broadcast through BEAM TV's digital subchannel after almost a year of halt broadcast due to the lapsed of its broadcast franchise in 2020.
- October 6 – The Movie and Television Review and Classification Board Classification ratings celebrated its 10th anniversary of broadcasting the local channels since 2011.
- October 11 – ABS-CBN Corporation and IQiyi announced a partnership to produce locally-exclusive Filipino originals on its owned streaming service, where the multi-title content deal for global audience made official on November 23.
- October 13 – Discovery+, a streaming service owned by Discovery, Inc. through its partner Globe Telecom, was launched and became available in the Philippines.
- October 18
  - Sky Cable launched five channels on their line-up: Premier Sports, SPOTV, SPOTV2, TAP Action Flix and TAP Movies.
  - Eclat Media Group launched two TV channels in the Philippines: SPOTV and SPOTV2.
- October 24 – Mata ng Agila celebrated its 10th anniversary on Philippine television.
- October 29 – GMA Network celebrated its 60th anniversary of broadcasting as a television network.

=== November ===
- November 6 – Yey! resumed its broadcast as a programming block via Jeepney TV (everyday morning through Yey! Weekdays and Yey! Weekend) and Kapamilya Channel (Saturday morning through Yey! Weekend–thus replacing Just Love Kids, with an online web portal remained) after almost a year of halt broadcast due to the shutdown of ABS-CBN broadcasting in 2020.
- November 7 – Versus (boyband) and Yara (girl group), both of Manila, were hailed as POPinoy Grand P-Pop Stars.
- November 15 – Sky Cable launched DreamWorks Channel (SD in separate Tagalog-dubbed feed and HD in main English-dubbed feed) on their line-up.
- November 18 – Knowledge Channel celebrated its 25th anniversary of broadcasting.
- November 20 – Julianne Torres, the Reinanay from Muntinlupa, was hailed as "Ang Pinakanatatanging Ina" on It's Showtime's "ReINA ng Tahanan".
- November 21 – The World Tonight celebrated its 55th anniversary of the longest-running English-language newscast on Philippine television.
- November 27
  - Sky Cable launched DepEd-NCR Prime on their line-up.
  - Team Karylle, Amy and Kim was hailed as the twelfth anniversary grand champion (Magpasikat 2021: Labindala-WOAH! 12 Taong Saya at Pagsasama) on It's Showtime.
- November 29 – Streaming media Viu celebrated its 5th anniversary in the Philippines.

=== December ===
- December 2 – The Government of the Philippines (Presidential Communications Operations Office) and TAP Digital Media Ventures Corporation announced a deal with the Maharlika Pilipinas Basketball League to aired the invitational tournament games from December 11 to 23 via free-to-air network Intercontinental Broadcasting Corporation, the cable and satellite channel TAP Sports, and online livestreaming via TAP Go and the Facebook pages of MPBL and Chooks-to-Go Pilipinas. This is the first time that TAP DMV air a local programming (where the company mostly feature an acquired international contents) and the return of basketball games to broadcast on IBC (the last one being Community Basketball Association since 2019) and marked the end of its 3-year stint with ABS-CBN Corporation following the non-renewal of its congressional franchise on July 10, 2020, and the dissolution of ABS-CBN Sports division to close its business operations on August 31, 2020.
- December 6 – G Sat terminated Fight Sports on its line-up due to unknown reason. Meanwhile, the network continued to air via Cignal and Sky Cable. In addition, G Sat launched Premier Sports on its line-up.
- December 19 – Mariane Osabel of Lanao del Norte won the fourth season of The Clash.

=== Unknown dates ===
- February – Blackbox Studios launched its Filipino-owned independent streaming service, RAD.
- November – Highland TV was launched as a regional TV channel based in Baguio by Regional News Group and Tirad Pass Network where it broadcast via the digital subchannel of Global Satellite Technology Services.

== Debuts ==
=== Major networks ===
==== A2Z ====
The following are programs that debuted on A2Z:

- January 1: Disaster Preparedness (School at Home)
- January 21: Ready, Set, Read! (School at Home)
- February 20: Your Face Sounds Familiar season 3
- March 15: Count Your Lucky Stars
- March 20: Aja! Aja! Tayo sa Jeju
- March 21: Almost Paradise (season 1)
- March 22: Huwag Kang Mangamba
- April 19: Init sa Magdamag
- May 20: Tuldok (School at Home)
- May 30: He's Into Her (season 1)
- June 5: Everybody, Sing! season 1
- June 19: Bawal Lumabas: The Series and Rated Korina
- June 24: Class Project (School at Home)
- June 28: La Vida Lena (full series)
- July 25: Meow: The Secret Boy
- July 26: Balitang A2Z
- July 31: Aksyon Time (season 1) and Hoy, Love You!
- August 8: Click, Like, Share (season 1)
- September 4: Cardcaptor Sakura: Clear Card (Kidz Weekend)
- September 5: Click, Like, Share (season 2)
- September 13: Marry Me, Marry You
- September 18: Unloving U
- September 19: Legends of Dawn: The Sacred Stone
- October 3: Melting Me Softly
- October 12: Anyong Lupa (School at Home)
- October 16: Pinoy Big Brother: Kumunity Season 10
- October 23: Come and Hug Me
- November 6: Aksyon Time (season 2)
- November 15: Ulat A2Z and Viral Scandal
- December 12: Diyos at Bayan
- December 15: Balik Aral (School at Home)
- December 19: F4 Thailand: Boys Over Flowers
- December 23: Ser Ian's Class (School at Home) and Wikaharian Online World (School at Home)

===== Re-runs =====
- January 18: Charlotte (Kidz Toon Time)^{1}^{2}^{3}^{6}
- February 13: Pororo the Little Penguin (Kidz Weekend)^{2}^{3} and Tayo the Little Bus (Kidz Weekend)^{3}
- February 22: Remi, Nobody's Girl (Kidz Toon Time)^{1}^{3}
- March 1: The Trapp Family Singers (Kidz Toon Time)^{3}^{6}
- April 5: Judy Abbott (Kidz Toon Time)^{1}^{3}^{6} and Magpahanggang Wakas^{1}^{4}
- April 6: AgriCOOLture (School at Home)^{7}
- April 29: Constel (School at Home)^{8}
- May 3: Dolce Amore^{1}^{4}, Marco (Kidz Toon Time)^{2}^{3}^{6} and Sining sa Lipunan (School at Home)^{1}^{7}
- May 8: Masha and the Bear (Kidz Weekend)^{3} and PJ Masks (Kidz Weekend)^{3}
- May 31: Anne of Green Gables (Kidz Toon Time)^{1}^{3}^{6}
- June 4: Kuwentong Pambata (School at Home)^{7}
- June 15: K-Hub (School at Home)^{7}
- June 21: Payong K-Lusugan (School at Home)^{7}
- July 4: Ipaglaban Mo!^{1}^{4}
- July 10: Doraemon (2005; Kidz Weekend)^{3}
- July 19: Peter Pan and Wendy (Kidz Toon Time)^{1}^{3}
- July 26: Nang Ngumiti ang Langit^{1}^{4}
- August 9: Little Women II (Kidz Toon Time)^{1}^{3}
- September 20: Kuwentong Kartero (School at Home)^{7} and Naruto: Shippuden season 4 (Kidz Toon Time)^{1}^{3}^{5}
- October 9: Goin' Bulilit (Kidz Weekend)^{1}^{3}^{4}
- November 1: Power Rangers Ninja Steel (Kidz Toon Time)^{3}
- November 6: Peppa Pig (seasons 1 and 2; Kidz Weekend)^{3} and Rob the Robot (Kidz Weekend)^{3}
- November 15: Love Thy Woman^{1}^{9}
- November 29: Inazuma Eleven GO: Chrono Stone (Kidz Toon Time)^{3}

Notes
^ ^{a} Originally aired on ABS-CBN (now Kapamilya Channel)
^ ^{b} Originally aired on GMA
^ ^{c} Originally aired on Yey!
^ ^{d} Originally aired on Jeepney TV
^ ^{e} Originally aired on Hero (now defunct)
^ ^{f} Originally aired on Q (now GTV)
^ ^{g} Originally aired on Knowledge Channel
^ ^{h} Originally aired on NBN (now PTV)
^ ^{i} Originally aired on Kapamilya Channel

==== GMA ====
The following are programs that debuted on GMA Network:

- January 4: Fates & Furies
- January 8: Eat Well, Live Well, Stay Well (seasons 1 and 2)
- January 18: The Worst Witch (seasons 1 and 2)
- February 1: Balitang Bicolandia (GMA Bicol)
- February 6: Catch Me Out Philippines
- February 8: The Romantic Doctor 2
- February 15: Owe My Love
- February 16: On Record
- February 22: Babawiin Ko ang Lahat and Heirs of the Night
- March 1: The Blooming Treasure
- March 13: Detective Conan season 8
- March 15: First Yaya and Stories of Hope
- March 22: I Can See You (season 2)
- April 19: The Desire
- April 26: Heartful Café and The Penthouse (season 1)
- May 1: Agimat ng Agila (season 1)
- May 24: The Gifted
- June 14: Her Private Life
- June 21: Ang Dalawang Ikaw and Lie After Lie
- July 5: The World Between Us (season 1)
- July 12: Game of Affection
- July 17: Pepito Manaloto: Ang Unang Kuwento
- July 26: Legal Wives
- August 2: God of Lost Fantasy, Nagbabagang Luha and The Sand Princess
- August 7: Yo-kai Watch Shadowside
- August 21: Makulay ang Buhay (season 2)
- August 30: Oh My Baby and The Penthouse (season 2)
- September 11: Regal Studio Presents
- September 12: Dinofroz and Knorr Nutri-Sarap Kitchen
- September 13: Stories from the Heart
- September 20: Mr. Queen
- September 27: The Bureau of Magical Things (season 1) and To Have & to Hold
- October 2: The Clash season 4
- October 11: Tale of the Nine Tailed and When the Weather Is Fine
- October 16: Pera Paraan
- October 17: Home Base Plus (season 22)
- October 25: Las Hermanas and Scripting Your Destiny
- November 8: Love Beyond Time
- November 15: I Left My Heart in Sorsogon
- November 22: The World Between Us (season 2)
- November 27: Ultraman R/B
- December 6: The Worst Witch (season 3)
- December 20: The Gifted: Graduation and Movie Holidates
- December 26: Happy ToGetHer (seasons 1 and 2)

===== Re-runs =====
- February 7: Yo-kai Watch (season 2)
- February 13: One Piece season 11
- February 14: Angry Birds Toons
- March 15: Slam Dunk^{5}
- March 20: Angry Birds Stella
- March 28: Toriko (season 2)
- March 29: Ang Dalawang Mrs. Real
- April 5: Karelasyon
- April 18: The Clash (seasons 1–3 "The Final Clash" episode)
- April 19: Mako Mermaids
- May 24: Innamorata
- June 7: Endless Love (2010)
- June 13: Sirkus
- June 19: Hunter × Hunter (season 3; 2011) and Simba: The King Lion^{3}
- June 29: Investigative Documentaries^{1}
- July 3: Ang Pinaka^{1}^{2}
- July 27: The Good Daughter
- August 16: Ghost Fighter^{4}
- September 5: Puppy in My Pocket: Adventures in Pocketville
- October 30: Karelasyon
- November 1: Wolfblood (season 3)
- November 8: My Love from the Star
- November 15: Ang Lihim ni Annasandra

Notes
^ ^{a} Originally aired on GMA News TV (now GTV)
^ ^{b} Originally aired on Q (now GTV)
^ ^{c} Originally aired on GTV
^ ^{d} Originally aired on IBC
^ ^{e} Originally aired on ABC (now TV5)

==== TV5 ====
The following are programs that debuted on TV5:

- January 4: Paano ang Pangako?
- January 6: Sleepless: The Series
- January 7: Hapi House
- January 16: Wanted: Ang Serye
- January 22: Red Envelope
- January 24: ASAP Natin 'To, FPJ: Da King and John en Ellen (season 1)
- January 25: The Loyal Wife
- January 30: Born to Be a Star (season 2) and The Kasambahays
- January 31: M Countdown
- February 1: The Beauty Inside
- February 7: Black Lightning season 1
- February 22: Primetime Sine Festival
- March 7: Gen Z
- March 8: Ang sa Iyo ay Akin, FPJ's Ang Probinsyano, Pinoy Big Brother: Connect and Walang Hanggang Paalam
- March 13: The Wall Philippines (season 1)
- March 15: Count Your Lucky Stars
- March 20: 1000 Heartbeats: Pintig Pinoy, The Apprentice: ONE Championship Edition, Encounter (Philippine adaptation) and Top 20 Funniest
- March 22: Huwag Kang Mangamba
- April 5: Niña Niño and Sing Galing! (2nd incarnation; season 1)
- April 12: Cine Cinco
- April 17: Sine Todo
- April 18: Sine Spotlight
- April 19: Init sa Magdamag
- April 25: Hollywood Movies
- May 1: Sari-Sari Original Telemovie
- May 3: Reina de corazones
- May 8: Samurai Jack
- May 9: John en Ellen (season 2)
- May 10: Frontline sa Umaga and The Secret Life of My Secretary
- May 15: Sari-Sari Presents: Viva Cinema
- June 5: The Game Weekend and Rolling In It Philippines (season 1)
- June 13: POPinoy
- June 19: Puto (2021 television remake)
- June 28: La Vida Lena (full series) and Welcome to Waikiki
- July 4: POPinoy PopDates
- September 13: Marry Me, Marry You
- September 18: Di Na Muli and Sing Galing: Sing-lebrity Edition (season 1)
- September 27: Frontline Tonight
- October 4: Mag Badyet Tayo!
- October 25: True Beauty
- November 15: Viral Scandal

===== Re-runs =====
- January 11: Adventure Time^{5}, Ben 10 (Classic; 2005)^{2}^{4}, Generator Rex and The Marvelous Misadventures of Flapjack
- January 16: Johnny Bravo^{2}
- February 8: María Mercedes^{1}
- February 22: Batibot and Istorifik: Pidol's Kuwentong Fantastik
- April 6: Pidol's Wonderland
- May 8: Gotham season 1
- July 3: Stay-In Love
- July 31: María la del Barrio^{2}^{4}
- October 4: Reply 1988
- October 9: #ParangNormal Activity
- October 23: My Hero Academia (seasons 1 and 2)^{3}
- November 6: Kagat ng Dilim (2020)

Notes
^ ^{a} Originally aired on ABS-CBN (now Kapamilya Channel)
^ ^{b} Originally aired on GMA
^ ^{c} Originally aired on Yey!
^ ^{d} Originally aired on RPN (now CNN Philippines)
^ ^{e} Originally aired on CNN Philippines

=== State-owned networks ===
==== PTV ====
The following are programs that debuted on People's Television Network:

- June 12: Isumbong Mo Kay Tulfo
- December 3: Sundown (season 2)

==== IBC ====
The following are programs that debuted on IBC:

- March 7: Lakbay Pinas
- May 8: Oras ng Kings
- October 25: IBC Headliners (2nd incarnation)
- November 14: Minning Town

=== Minor networks ===
The following are programs that debuted on minor networks:

- January 4: Eat's Singing Time on Net 25
- February 12: Ang Dating Daan: Worldwide Bible Study on UNTV
- February 15: Balitalakayan on Net 25
- February 27: Ang Inyong Kawal on UNTV
- March 6: Heart of Wisdom on Light TV
- March 6: Ikaw ay Akin on Net 25
- March 30: Daan ng Buhay on Net 25
- April 6: Equip on Light TV
- April 10: Doulos Cell Celebration on Light TV
- June 12: Lingap Stories on Net 25
- July 11: Kidz Connect on Light TV
- August 1: Children's Worship Service on Light TV
- August 2: Good News on Light TV
- August 5: E-skwela and Shalomers on Light TV
- August 6: Real Talk on Light TV
- August 10: Let's Get Ready To TV Radyo on Net 25
- August 16: Ito Ang Tahanan on Net 25
- August 30: Kada Umaga and Negosyuniversity on Net 25
- October 18: Ano Sa Palagay N'yo? on Net 25
- November 1: Funniest Snackable Videos on Net 25
- November 13: Cucina ni Nadia on Net 25
- November 20: Responde: Mata ng Mamamayan and Tara! Ating Pasyalan on Net 25
- November 21: Tara Game, Agad Agad! on Net 25
- December 2: Let's Groove! on RJ DigiTV

==== Unknown ====
- CineKabalen, CLTV 36 Balitaan (2nd incarnation), CLTV 36 News, Dapat All: Human Rights for All, Kalinga ni Ria Vergara, Lugud Fernandino, Si Jay at Double J and TopPick on CLTV 36

=== Other channels ===
The following are programs that debuted on other channels:

- January 4: State of the Nation on GMA News TV (now GTV)
- January 4: Game Ka Na Ba? (2nd incarnation; season 2) on Jeepney TV
- January 4: Bulletproof, Chicago Fire season 1 and Riviera (season 1) on TAP Edge
- January 5: Paano ang Pangako? on One Screen
- January 5: Chicago Med season 1, Dateline NBC, Judge Jerry, NBC Nightly News, Rig 45 and Transplant on TAP Edge
- January 6: Chicago P.D., Intelligence, Treadstone and Urban Myths on TAP Edge
- January 7: A Discovery of Witches, Chicago Justice and Gangs of London on TAP Edge
- January 8: Unconditional on One Screen
- January 8: The Magicians and The Purge on TAP Edge
- January 9: American Greed, Bloodline Detectives and TAP Edge Weekend Movies (now Real Deal) on TAP Edge
- January 10: World on Fire on TAP Edge
- January 10: Simply K-Pop on Hallypop
- January 11: All-Out Action on Solar Sports
- January 16: Mind S-Cool (season 3) on Colours
- January 16: I'm Live on Hallypop
- January 16: Wanted: Ang Serye on One Screen
- January 17: Mind S-Cool (season 3) on One PH
- January 17: Seasons of Love on GMA News TV (now GTV)
- January 18: Secret Love Online and The Lost Recipe on GMA News TV (now GTV)
- January 24: Real Talk: The Heart of the Matter (season 1) on Jeepney TV and Kapamilya Channel
- January 24: BBC My World on One News
- January 24: Geek and Gamers Guide (season 2) on One Sports
- January 25: Hayat (ETCerye) on ETC
- January 25: Rising Sun on GMA News TV (now GTV)
- January 25: John en Ellen (season 1) on One Screen
- January 29: Designated Survivor season 1 on One Screen
- January 30: Agri Asenso on DZRH News Television
- January 30: My Fantastic Pag-ibig on GMA News TV (now GTV)
- January 31: Born to Be a Star (season 2) on Sari-Sari Channel
- February 1: Fall into Temptation and Sightless Love on Telenovela Channel
- February 4: M Countdown on Colours
- February 5: Balitang Bicolandia (GMA Regional TV Strip) on GMA News TV (now GTV)
- February 8: After School Club on Hallypop
- February 10: Gangnam Insider's Picks and Rolling in K-Pop on Hallypop
- February 14: Becoming Pinoy, Game of the Gens (GOTG) and Pinoy Aklatan: Filipino Stories for Kids (Pinoy A+) on GMA News TV (now GTV)
- February 14: I Love 1000 on Knowledge Channel
- February 15: One Balita Ngayon on One PH
- February 16: Impact Wrestling on TAP Sports
- February 20: Your Face Sounds Familiar season 3 on Kapamilya Channel
- February 21: Farm to Table on GMA News TV (now GTV)
- March 7: Kumu Star Ka on Jeepney TV and TeleRadyo
- March 8: Love Actually on GTV
- March 9: We K-Pop on Hallypop
- March 11: K-Rush on Hallypop
- March 13: Magandang Kabuhayan on Jeepney TV
- March 14: Gen Z on One Screen
- March 15: First Yaya and Pure Intention on GTV
- March 15: First Yaya and The Lost Recipe on Heart of Asia
- March 15: Count Your Lucky Stars on Kapamilya Channel
- March 20: Aja! Aja! Tayo sa Jeju on Kapamilya Channel
- March 21: All-Out Sundays on GTV
- March 21: Almost Paradise (season 1) on Kapamilya Channel
- March 21: Encounter (Philippine adaptation) on Sari-Sari Channel
- March 22: Huwag Kang Mangamba on Jeepney TV and Kapamilya Channel
- March 22: The Apprentice: ONE Championship Edition on One Sports
- March 29: Daan ng Buhay on INC TV
- April 5: I Can See You (season 2) on GTV and Heart of Asia
- April 5: Block Screening, Pinoy Movie Date, Takilya Throwback and Timeless Telesine on I Heart Movies
- April 5: Suits on Kapamilya Channel
- April 6: The Best Talk with Boy Abunda on Cinema One
- April 6: Niña Niño and Sing Galing! (2nd incarnation; season 1) on Colours
- April 7: Rig 45 (season 2) on TAP Edge
- April 10: Turning Points on INC TV
- April 11: Boys' Lockdown on Heart of Asia
- April 12: Chinatown News TV (CNTV) on ANC
- April 19: Game Ka Na Ba? (2nd incarnation; season 3) and Init sa Magdamag on Jeepney TV
- April 19: Init sa Magdamag on Kapamilya Channel
- April 26: G! Flicks and Simba: The King Lion on GTV
- April 26: Heartful Café on Heart of Asia
- April 26: Myx Premiere on Myx
- April 26: The Game on One Sports
- May 2: Pusong Pinoy sa Amerika (season 16) on GTV
- May 3: Dos Kumpanyeras, DZRH Correspondents, Metro Manila Ngayon and Public Service Hour on DZRH News Television
- May 3: Two Spirits' Love on GTV
- May 8: Making It (season 2) on ETC
- May 10: The Love Knot on GTV
- May 10: John en Ellen (season 2) on One Screen
- May 10: My Husband's Family on Telenovela Channel
- May 13: Afterlife on One Screen
- May 13: WWE NXT on TAP Sports
- May 15: Kapamilya Journeys of Hope on TeleRadyo
- May 16: WWE NXT UK on TAP Sports
- May 17: Reina de corazones on One Screen
- May 18: 1001 Nights on Knowledge Channel
- May 22: Recreate on One News
- May 22: DZRH COMELEC Hour on DZRH News Television
- May 23: Rise Up Stronger on GTV
- May 24: After the Fact on ANC
- May 29: When Duty Calls on GTV
- May 30: He's Into Her (season 1) and We Rise Together on Kapamilya Channel
- June 4: Murder by Tsismis on One Screen
- June 4: The Purge (season 2) on TAP Edge
- June 5: Gour-Made At Home on INC TV
- June 5: Everybody, Sing! season 1 on Kapamilya Channel
- June 5: The Game Weekend on One News, One Sports and One Sports+
- June 6: Fresh Take on Myx
- June 6: Rolling In It Philippines (season 1) on Sari-Sari Channel
- June 6: The Capture on TAP Edge
- June 7: Asian Cinemix on Heart of Asia
- June 8: Chicago Med season 2 on TAP Edge
- June 13: Endless Love (season 2; ETCerye) on ETC
- June 13: Gameboys (season 1) on Heart of Asia
- June 13: Bulletproof (season 2) on TAP Edge
- June 13: POPinoy on Colours
- June 14: POPinoy PopDates on Colours
- June 15: POPinoy All Access on Colours
- June 19: Bawal Lumabas: The Series and Rated Korina on Kapamilya Channel
- June 20: Puto (2021 television remake) on Sari-Sari Channel
- June 20: American Greed (season 12) and Celebrity Obsessed on TAP Edge
- June 21: Prince of Wolf on GTV
- June 21: Showbiz Play Pa More on Jeepney TV
- June 22: Temple on TAP Edge
- June 24: A Discovery of Witches (season 2) and COBRA on TAP Edge
- June 26: Tina Monzon-Palma Reports on ABS-CBN News Channel
- June 28: La Vida Lena (full series) on Kapamilya Channel
- June 28: Lying Heart on Telenovela Channel
- June 30: Straight Up Steve Austin and World's Most Unexplained on TAP Edge
- July 1: A.P. Bio and The Voice Kids UK on TAP TV
- July 2: Celebrity Game Face and E! True Hollywood Story on TAP TV
- July 3: The Real Story of... and Bodyguard on TAP Edge
- July 3: Hell's Kitchen season 17, Top Chef and The Wine Show on TAP TV
- July 4: Flex on GTV
- July 4: Connecting, Songland and The Voice UK on TAP TV
- July 5: The World Between Us (season 1) on Heart of Asia
- July 5: Love Island USA season 1 on TAP TV
- July 6: Keeping Up with the Kardashians season 16 and Revenge Body with Khloé Kardashian on TAP TV
- July 7: Good Girls and The Bold Type on TAP TV
- July 12: La Patrona on One Screen
- July 12: The Candidate on Telenovela Channel
- July 18: Pinoy Aklatan: Filipino Stories for Kids (Pinoy A+) on GTV
- July 19: In Love with Ramon on Telenovela Channel
- July 25: Real Talk: The Heart of the Matter (season 2) on Jeepney TV
- July 25: Meow: The Secret Boy and Real Talk: The Heart of the Matter (season 2) on Kapamilya Channel
- July 26: Daig Kayo ng Lola Ko, IJuander and Rise Up Stronger on DepEd TV (GMA digital channel)
- July 26: Regional TV News on GTV
- July 26: Legal Wives on Heart of Asia
- July 26: Criminal Minds on Kapamilya Channel
- July 28: Pinas Sarap on DepEd TV (GMA digital channel)
- July 29: I-Witness on DepEd TV (GMA digital channel)
- July 30: Mr. Player on DepEd TV (GMA digital channel)
- July 30: Regal Treasures on GTV
- July 31: Film 101 on DepEd TV (GMA digital channel)
- July 31: Hoy, Love You! on Kapamilya Channel
- August 2: ESPN X Games on One Sports
- August 2: #MaineGoals on BuKo Channel
- August 2: In Time With You on GTV
- August 7: Kusina ni Mamang on BuKo Channel
- August 8: Chinese by Blood, Filipino by Heart (season 1) on CNN Philippines
- August 8: Click, Like, Share (season 1) on Kapamilya Channel
- August 9: La Doña and Saksi on GTV
- August 16: La Vida Lena (full series) on Jeepney TV
- August 17: Keeping Up with the Kardashians (season 17) on TAP TV
- August 23: Game Ka Na Ba? (2nd incarnation; season 4) on Jeepney TV
- August 29: eSport 24 (ES24) and Scream Flix on Hallypop
- August 30: Legal Wives on GTV
- September 4: Box Yourself and Zoo Clues on CNN Philippines
- September 5: Click, Like, Share (season 2) on Kapamilya Channel
- September 6: Call Me Maybi on Myx
- September 11: Ka-Kwentuhan Karen on DZRH TV
- September 13: Marry Me, Marry You on Jeepney TV and Kapamilya Channel
- September 14: Politics as Usual on CNN Philippines
- September 18: Sing Galing: Sing-lebrity Edition (season 1) on Colours
- September 18: Unloving U on Kapamilya Channel
- September 19: Legends of Dawn: The Sacred Stone on Kapamilya Channel
- September 19: Di Na Muli on Sari-Sari Channel
- September 22: G Diaries on TeleRadyo
- September 26: Ben X Jim (season 1) on Heart of Asia
- September 27: To Have & to Hold on Heart of Asia
- September 27: Love Island USA season 2 on TAP TV
- September 28: Keeping Up with the Kardashians season 18 on TAP TV
- September 29: Love vs. Stars on One Screen
- October 2: Siyensikat on CNN Philippines
- October 3: Melting Me Softly on Kapamilya Channel
- October 4: Riviera (season 2) on TAP Edge
- October 4: I Plead Guilty and It Had to Be You on Telenovela Channel
- October 7: The Sinner (season 1) on TAP Edge
- October 8: Krypton on One Screen
- October 9: Pet Pals TV (season 1) on Pinoy Xtreme
- October 11: On the Spot on Kapamilya Channel
- October 11: Papá a toda madre on Telenovela Channel
- October 15: Obra Macabra on One Screen
- October 16: Pinoy Big Brother: Kumunity Season 10 on Jeepney TV and Kapamilya Channel
- October 18: Dapat Alam Mo! on GTV
- October 19: Keeping Up with the Kardashians (season 19) on TAP TV
- October 23: Come and Hug Me on Kapamilya Channel
- October 23: Hell's Kitchen season 18 on TAP TV
- October 24: Laugh Laban and TrabaHanap TV on Cine Mo!
- October 24: The Best Talk with Boy Abunda (season 2) on Jeepney TV
- October 25: Stories of Hope on GTV
- October 26: On Record on GTV
- October 26: NBC Nightly News on TAP TV
- October 27: Tunay na Buhay on GTV
- October 28: Reporter's Notebook on GTV
- October 28: Now Streaming on One Screen
- October 30: Hello from the Other Side on GTV
- November 1: Mr. Merman on GTV
- November 5: Jay Leno's Garage (season 1) on TAP Sports
- November 6: K-Drama Special Stories on GTV
- November 6: 10 Things You Don't Know on TAP TV
- November 7: KBS Song Festival on Hallypop
- November 7: KidSine Presents and Laugh Laban on Jeepney TV
- November 7: Code 404 on TAP Edge
- November 8: Finding Love on GTV
- November 8: A Style for You on Hallypop
- November 10: You Hee-yeol's Sketchbook on Hallypop
- November 12: The Return of Superman on Hallypop
- November 12: Diskarte on TeleRadyo
- November 15: Christmas Cartoon Festival Presents and I Left My Heart in Sorsogon on GTV
- November 15: I Left My Heart in Sorsogon on Heart of Asia
- November 15: Viral Scandal on Jeepney TV and Kapamilya Channel
- November 16: Chicago Med season 3 on TAP Edge
- November 16: Keeping Up with the Kardashians (season 20) on TAP TV
- November 22: The World Between Us (season 2) on Heart of Asia
- November 29: The World Between Us (season 2) on GTV
- December 4: Britannia on TAP Action Flix
- December 6: Myx Pressplay on Myx
- December 6: All Politics is Local on One News and One PH
- December 12: Tara Peeps on DZRH TV
- December 12: TableLove with Pinky on ETC
- December 13: The Frog Prince on GTV
- December 19: Merry Flixmas on Hallypop
- December 19: F4 Thailand: Boys Over Flowers on Kapamilya Channel
- December 26: The Handmaid's Tale on TAP Movies
- December 30: The Sinner (season 2) on TAP Edge
- December 31: Jay Leno's Garage (season 2) on TAP Sports

==== Unknown dates ====
- February: Ang Inyong Armed Forces, Ang Inyong Kawal, News Express, News in 3, Up Up Pilipinas and WEmen on tvQ2
- March–April: #KKO, Balik Loob sa Pagbabago, Brakefast and The Tito Potato Show on tvQ2
- October: One Balita Pilipinas (noontime and primetime editions) on One News

==== Unknown ====
- Building Bridges on CNN Philippines
- Adbokasiya (2nd incarnation), The Better News and TNVS: Trending 'N Viral Show on DZRH TV

==== Re-runs ====
- January 4: Boys Over Flowers on GMA News TV (now GTV)^{1}^{8}^{15}
- January 4: Nakee on Heart of Asia^{7}
- January 4: Momay on Jeepney TV^{1}
- January 4: Saturday Night Live season 42 on Solar Sports^{12}
- January 11: Bagani and Kahit Puso'y Masugatan on Jeepney TV^{1}
- January 11: Furious Fire on One Screen^{3}
- January 16: Pasión de Amor on Jeepney TV^{1}
- January 18: Pure Love (2014) on Jeepney TV^{1}
- January 18: Rakshasa Street on Heart of Asia^{2}^{7}
- January 18: Asintado on Kapamilya Channel^{1}
- January 23: Masked Singer Pilipinas season 1 on Sari-Sari Channel^{3}
- January 25: Man x Man^{7} and While You Were Sleeping^{2} on Heart of Asia
- January 30: Best of Imbestigador on GMA News TV (now GTV)^{2}
- February 1: ETCerye Rewind on ETC
  - February 1: Everywhere I Go
  - September 27: Hayat
- February 1: Ika-6 na Utos (remaining episodes only) on Heart of Asia^{2}^{18}
- February 1: Hanggang Saan, Pusong Ligaw, Since I Found You and The Story of Us on Jeepney TV^{1}
- February 2: Saturday Night Live season 43 on Solar Sports^{12}
- February 3: Pokémon the Series: Sun & Moon on GMA News TV (now GTV)^{2}
- February 8: Fire of Eternal Love on Heart of Asia^{2}
- February 8: Hana Nochi Hare on Kapamilya Channel^{21}
- February 12: Making It (season 1) on ETC^{12}
- February 14: Kay Tagal Kang Hinintay on Jeepney TV^{1}
- February 15: Buena Familia^{2}^{18}, Little Nanay^{2} and Ugly Duckling^{7} on Heart of Asia
- February 15: Little Champ on Jeepney TV^{1}
- February 15: Mother on Kapamilya Channel^{21}
- February 15: Destined to be Yours on One Screen^{2}
- February 21: Fairy Tail season 3 on GMA News TV (now GTV)^{2}
- February 22: Angel Heart on One Screen^{3}
- February 28: Chibi Maruko-chan^{2}^{7} and Secret Seven^{7} on Heart of Asia
- March 1: Fight for My Way and Love Alert on Heart of Asia^{2}
- March 1: Nathaniel on Jeepney TV^{1}
- March 8: Funny Ka, Pare Ko on Cine Mo!
- March 8: Dyosa on Jeepney TV^{1}
- March 13: Charlotte^{1}^{5}^{16}^{25}, Kongsuni and Friends^{5} and Oddbods^{3}^{5} on Kapamilya Channel
- March 14: Art Jam^{1}^{23} and Pahina^{1}^{23}^{25} on Kapamilya Channel
- March 15: Gangnam Beauty on Kapamilya Channel^{1}^{21}
- March 22: Hunter × Hunter (seasons 1 and 2; 2011) on GTV^{2}
- March 23: Pokémon the Series: XYZ on GTV^{2}^{7}
- March 28: Ngayon at Kailanman on Jeepney TV^{1}
- March 29: All of Me on Jeepney TV^{1}
- April 4: U-Prince on Heart of Asia^{7}
- April 5: Angel's Last Mission and The Crown Princess on Heart of Asia^{2}
- April 5: Playhouse and Sana Dalawa ang Puso on Jeepney TV^{1}
- April 5: Magpahanggang Wakas on Kapamilya Channel^{1}^{8}
- April 5: María la del Barrio on One Screen^{2}^{17}
- April 7: Yo-Kai Watch (seasons 1 to 3) on GTV^{2}
- April 11: Only You on Jeepney TV^{1}
- April 11: 1000 Heartbeats: Pintig Pinoy and The Wall Philippines on Sari-Sari Channel^{3}
- April 12: Strong Girl Bong-soon on Heart of Asia^{2}
- April 12: The Beauty Inside on One Screen^{3}
- April 16: Gotham season 2 on One Screen^{3}^{12}
- April 19: Legend of Fuyao^{7} and Taste of Love^{2} on Heart of Asia
- April 19: Princess and I and Ysabella on Jeepney TV^{1}
- May 3: Kadenang Ginto^{1}^{19} and Noah^{1} on Jeepney TV
- May 3: Dolce Amore on Kapamilya Channel^{1}^{8}
- May 8: Parasite Island on Kapamilya Channel^{1}
- May 10: Are You Human? on Heart of Asia^{2}
- May 16: Local Legends on TeleRadyo^{1}
- May 17: Madam Pushy and I on Heart of Asia^{2}
- May 17: 100 Days My Prince on Kapamilya Channel^{1}^{21}
- May 23: When a Snail Falls in Love on Heart of Asia^{7}
- May 24: Secret Garden on Heart of Asia^{2}^{7}
- May 24: Nasaan Ka Nang Kailangan Kita on Jeepney TV^{1}
- May 24: The Loyal Wife on One Screen^{3}
- May 31: Two Cops on Kapamilya Channel^{21}
- June 7: Scarlet Heart on GTV^{2}
- June 7: Endless Love (2010) and Princess Hours (2017 Thai version) on Heart of Asia^{2}
- June 13: The King is in Love on Jeepney TV^{1}^{19}^{21}
- June 14: Banana Split on Cine Mo!^{1}^{8}
- June 14: Ben 10: Ultimate Alien^{2}^{3} and Knock Out^{2}^{29} on GTV
- June 14: Ikaw Lang ang Iibigin on Jeepney TV^{1}
- June 21: Misty on Heart of Asia^{2}
- June 21: Meteor Garden (2001 Taiwanese version) on Jeepney TV^{1}^{2}^{16}^{21}
- June 25: The Magicians (season 2) on TAP Edge^{11}
- June 26: Rob the Robot and The Garfield Show on Kapamilya Channel^{5}
- June 30: Chicago P.D. season 2 on TAP Edge^{14}
- July 2: Black Lightning season 1 on One Screen^{3}
- July 3: Precious Hearts Romances Presents: Araw Gabi on Jeepney TV^{1}
- July 3: Ancient Aliens (season 1) on One Screen^{2}^{3}^{7}
- July 5: My Absolute Boyfriend^{7} and Temptation of Wife^{2} on Heart of Asia
- July 5: And I Love You So on Jeepney TV^{1}
- July 5: Chicago Fire season 2 on TAP Edge^{14}
- July 12: Rising Sun (season 1)^{7} and The Last Empress^{2} on Heart of Asia
- July 17: Heirs of the Night and The Shannara Chronicles (season 2) on GTV^{2}
- July 17: The Legal Wife on Jeepney TV^{1}
- July 18: Hay, Bahay! on GTV^{2}
- July 19: Adarna^{2}^{18}, Because of You^{2}^{18} and Oh My Ghost^{2}^{7} on Heart of Asia
- July 19: May Minamahal on Jeepney TV^{1}
- July 19: The Secret Life of My Secretary on One Screen^{3}
- July 26: Sky Castle on Heart of Asia^{2}
- July 26: 100% Pinoy! on DepEd TV (GMA digital channel)^{2}
- July 26: Meteor Garden II (2002 Taiwanese version)^{1}^{2}^{16}^{21} and Sandugo^{1} on Jeepney TV
- July 26: Nang Ngumiti ang Langit on Kapamilya Channel^{1}^{8}
- July 27: Reel Time on DepEd TV (GMA digital channel)^{7}
- August 1: The Legend of Paranormal Stories on GTV^{7}
- August 1: Home Along Da Riles on Jeepney TV^{1}
- August 1: AgriCOOLture on Kapamilya Channel^{23}
- August 2: 1 for 3^{2}, H3O: Ha Ha Ha Over^{16}, Iskul Bukol^{27}, Leya, ang Pinakamagandang Babae sa Ilalim ng Lupa^{2}, Lokomoko^{3}^{9}, Mac and Chiz^{3}, Pidol's Wonderland^{3} and Wow Mali^{3}^{28} on BuKo Channel
- August 2: My Binondo Girl on Jeepney TV^{1}
- August 7: Bawal na Game Show^{3}, Bubble Gang^{2}, Celebrity Samurai^{3}, Fill in the Bank^{3}, Sugo Mga Kapatid^{3} and Tropang Trumpo^{28} on BuKo Channel
- August 7: Hiwaga ng Kambat on Kapamilya Channel^{1}^{8}
- August 8: Gangnam Beauty on Jeepney TV^{1}^{21}
- August 9: Innocent Defendant on GTV^{2}
- August 9: Extraordinary You on Heart of Asia^{7}
- August 9: Oh My G! on Jeepney TV^{1}
- August 16: Ilustrado on DepEd TV (GMA digital channel)^{2}^{7}^{18}
- August 23: Aladdin: You Would've Heard the Name on Heart of Asia^{2}^{7}
- August 23: Bukas na Lang Kita Mamahalin, Iisa Pa Lamang and My Dear Heart on Jeepney TV^{1}
- August 23: Because This Is My First Life on Kapamilya Channel^{21}
- August 28: Fighter of Destiny on Heart of Asia^{7}
- August 30: Strong Girl Bong-soon on DepEd TV (GMA digital channel)^{2}
- August 30: Minsan Lang Kita Iibigin and Palibhasa Lalake on Jeepney TV^{1}
- August 30: Hidden Love on Heart of Asia^{7}
- September 5: Angry Birds Blues on GTV^{2}
- September 5: Rakshasa Street on Heart of Asia^{2}^{7}
- September 6: Amaya on DepEd TV (GMA digital channel)^{2}^{7}^{18}
- September 13: Boys Over Flowers^{1}^{8}^{15} and Stairway to Heaven^{2}^{7}^{16} on Heart of Asia
- September 13: María Mercedes on One Screen^{1}^{3}
- September 20: Encantadia (2016) on DepEd TV (GMA digital channel)^{2}^{18}
- September 20: Dading^{2} and Where Stars Land^{7} on Heart of Asia
- September 22: Chicago P.D. season 3 on TAP Edge^{14}
- September 23: Celebrity Playtime on Jeepney TV^{1}
- September 27: Playful Kiss on GTV^{2}
- September 27: Calla Lily on Jeepney TV^{1}
- September 27: Chicago Fire season 3 on TAP Edge^{14}
- October 4: Live Up to Your Name on Kapamilya Channel^{21}
- October 10: Born For You on Jeepney TV^{1}
- October 18: Hawak Kamay and Tayong Dalawa on Jeepney TV^{1}
- October 22: Alamat on DepEd TV (GMA digital channel)^{2}
- October 24: Green Rose and The Haunted on Jeepney TV^{1}
- October 25: Secret Love Online^{7} and VIP^{2} on Heart of Asia
- October 30: Ikaw Lamang on Jeepney TV^{1}
- October 31: Detective Conan: Episode One^{2} and Slam Dunk^{2}^{28} on GTV
- October 31: Legend of Fuyao on Heart of Asia^{7}
- November 1: Her Private Life on Heart of Asia^{2}
- November 1: A Love So Beautiful on Kapamilya Channel^{1}
- November 6: Kongsuni and Friends^{5}^{19}and Team Yey!^{5} on Jeepney TV
- November 6: Goin' Bulilit and Max Steel on Kapamilya Channel^{1}
- November 8: Kakambal ni Eliana on Heart of Asia^{2}
- November 8: Johnny Test^{5} and Max Steel^{1} on Jeepney TV
- November 8: POPinoy on One PH^{3}
- November 15: Daddy Di Do Du^{2}, Daisy Siete^{2} and Moomoo & Me^{3} on BuKo Channel
- November 15: Love Thy Woman on Kapamilya Channel
- November 20: Charming Girl on Heart of Asia^{2}
- November 21: #ParangNormal Activity^{3}^{9} and Pepito Manaloto^{2}^{18} on BuKo Channel
- November 22: Fates & Furies on Heart of Asia^{2}
- November 27: Price of Passion on Heart of Asia^{7}
- November 29: Aryana on Jeepney TV^{1}
- November 29: I am Not a Robot on Kapamilya Channel^{1}
- December 5: Detective Conan (season 8) on GTV^{2}
- December 6: Nakee^{7} and The Romantic Doctor 2^{2} on Heart of Asia
- December 6: The Garfield Show on Jeepney TV^{5}^{19}
- December 6: The Secret Life of My Secretary on One Screen^{3}
- December 13: The Blooming Treasure on Heart of Asia^{2}
- December 13: Starla^{1}^{5}^{19} and Vietnam Rose^{1} on Jeepney TV
- December 25: Uncoupling on Kapamilya Channel^{1}
- December 27: Hiram na Alaala^{2}^{18} and Rising Sun (season 2)^{7} on Heart of Asia
- Notes
1. ^ ^{a} Originally aired on ABS-CBN (now Kapamilya Channel)
2. ^ ^{b} Originally aired on GMA
3. ^ ^{c} Originally aired on TV5
4. ^ ^{d} Originally aired on Cine Mo!
5. ^ ^{e} Originally aired on Yey!
6. ^ ^{f} Originally aired on S+A
7. ^ ^{g} Originally aired on GMA News TV (now GTV)
8. ^ ^{h} Originally aired on Jeepney TV
9. ^ ^{i} Originally aired on Sari-Sari Channel
10. ^ ^{j} Originally aired on Hero (now defunct)
11. ^ ^{k} Originally aired on ETC
12. ^ ^{l} Originally aired on Jack TV (now defunct)
13. ^ ^{m} Originally aired on 2nd Avenue (now defunct)
14. ^ ^{n} Originally aired on CT (now defunct)
15. ^ ^{o} Originally aired on Studio 23 (now S+A)
16. ^ ^{p} Originally aired on Q (now GTV)
17. ^ ^{q} Originally aired on RPN (now CNN Philippines)
18. ^ ^{r} Originally aired on Fox Filipino (now defunct)
19. ^ ^{s} Originally aired on Kapamilya Channel
20. ^ ^{t} Originally aired on Metro Channel
21. ^ ^{u} Originally aired on Asianovela Channel
22. ^ ^{v} Originally aired on PTV
23. ^ ^{w} Originally aired on Knowledge Channel
24. ^ ^{x} Originally aired on CNN Philippines
25. ^ ^{y} Originally aired on A2Z
26. ^ ^{z} Originally aired on GTV
27. ^ ^{aa} Originally aired on IBC
28. ^ ^{ab} Originally aired on ABC (now TV5)
29. ^ ^{ac} Originally aired on TeleAsia Filipino (now defunct)

=== Video streaming services ===
The following are programs that debuted on video streaming services:

- January 13: Horrorscope on iWantTFC
- January 15: Section St. Valentine: The Disappearance of Divine on WeTV iflix
- January 18: Hoy, Love You! on iWantTFC
- February 1: Afterlife on Cignal Play
- February 8: Unloving U on iWantTFC
- February 12: Ben X Jim (season 2) on Upstream PH
- February 12: Parang Kayo Pero Hindi on VivaMax
- February 13: B&B: The Story of the Battle of Brody & Brandy on WeTV iflix
- February 22: Murder by Tsismis on Cignal Play
- April 9: Kung Pwede Lang on VivaMax
- May 1: Love vs. Stars on Cignal Play
- May 17: Coke Studio: Itodo Mo, Beat Mo on YouTube (Coke Studio Philippines)
- May 28: He's Into Her (season 1) on iWantTFC
- June 5: Click, Like, Share (season 1) on iWantTFC and KTX
- June 11: Trese on Netflix
- July 2: Boyfriend No. 13 on WeTV iflix
- July 10: GVBOYS: Pangmalakasang Good Vibes on YouTube (Puregold Channel)
- July 14: My Sunset Girl on iWantTFC
- August 16: Love Beneath the Stars on iWantTFC
- September 3: Click, Like, Share (season 2) on iWantTFC
- September 5: Pinoy Portal on YouTube (SMAC TV PROD)
- September 11: Hoy, Love You Two on iWantTFC
- September 12: On the Job on HBO Go
- September 24: Pasabuy on WeTV iflix
- September 25: The Gaming House on iWantTFC
- October 2: Limited Edition on YouTube (Bragais TV)
- October 15: BetCin on WeTV iflix
- October 30: Happy Place on iWantTFC
- November 6: Hero City Kids Force on iWantTFC
- November 12: Still on Viu
- November 26: Quaranthings (season 2) on Upstream PH
- December 4: Saying Goodbye on IQiyi
- December 15: Hello, Heart on IQiyi
- December 17: The Kangks Show on WeTV iflix
- December 30: Love at the End of the World on GagaOOLala

==== Unknown dates ====
- January: Alpha News on Alpha News Philippines
- January: Balitaktakan, Bicol.PH, Luzon Headlines and Talk Time on RNG

== Returning or renamed programs ==
=== Major networks ===
Show	Last aired	Retitled as/Season/Notes	Channel	Return date
Paano ang Pasko?	2021	Paano ang Pangako?	TV5	January 4
Love of My Life	2020	Same (new episodes)	GMA	January 18
Oh My Dad!	2021	Same (season 2)	TV5	January 23
John en Shirley	2007 (ABS-CBN)	John en Ellen	TV5	January 24
Born to Be a Star	2016	Same (season 2)	TV5	January 30
Centerstage	2020	Same (new episodes)	GMA	February 7
Anak ni Waray vs. Anak ni Biday	2020	Same (new episodes)	GMA	February 8
Magkaagaw	2020	Same (new episodes)	GMA	February 15
Your Face Sounds Familiar	2015 (ABS-CBN)	Same (season 3)	A2Z / Kapamilya Channel	February 20
Maharlika Pilipinas Basketball League	2020 (Liga / S+A)	Same (season 3)	A2Z	March 10
Detective Conan	2019	Same (season 8)	GMA	March 13
Aja! Aja! Tayo	2019 (TV5)	Aja! Aja! Tayo sa Jeju	A2Z / Kapamilya Channel	March 20
Encounter	2019 (ABS-CBN) / 2020 (Asianovela Channel)	Same (Philippine adaptation)	TV5	March 20
I Can See You	2020	Same (season 2)	GMA	March 22
Sing Galing!	2005 (ABC)	Same (2nd incarnation; season 1)	TV5 / Colours	April 5
John en Ellen	2021	Same (season 2)	TV5 / One Screen	May 9
Sari-Sari Channel Original Telemovie	2021	Sari-Sari Presents: Viva Cinema	TV5	May 15
Rated Korina	2021	Same (season 2)	A2Z / Kapamilya Channel	June 19
Rated Korina	2021	Same (season 2)	TV5 / One PH	June 20
La Vida Lena	2021 (iWantTFC)	Same (full series)	A2Z / Kapamilya Channel / TV5	June 28
Eat Well, Live Well, Stay Well	2021	Same (season 2)	GMA	July 9
Philippine Basketball Association	2020 (season 45: "Philippine Cup")	Same (season 46: "Philippine Cup")	TV5 / One Sports / PBA Rush	July 16
Pepito Manaloto	2021	Ang Unang Kuwento	GMA	July 17
Yo-kai Watch	2019	Shadowside	GMA	August 7
Makulay ang Buhay	2020	Same (season 2)	GMA	August 21
The Penthouse	2021	Same (season 2)	GMA	August 30
Mother Studio Presents	1996	Regal Studio Presents	GMA	September 11
The Clash	2020	Same (season 4)	GMA	October 2
Pinoy Big Brother	2021 (A2Z / Kapamilya Channel / TV5; season 9: "Connect")	Same (season 10: "Kumunity Season 10")	A2Z / Jeepney TV / Kapamilya Channel	October 16
Home Base Plus	2020	Same (season 22)	GMA	October 17
National Basketball Association	2021	Same (2021–22 season)	TV5 / One Sports / NBA TV Philippines	October 20
Aksyon Time	2021	Same (season 2)	A2Z	November 6
The World Between Us	2021	Same (season 2)	GMA / Heart of Asia	November 22
Ultraman	2018 (season 20: "Ginga")	Same (season 23: "R/B")	GMA	November 27
The Worst Witch	2021	Same (season 3)	GMA	December 6
Philippine Basketball Association	2021 (season 46: "Philippine Cup")	Same (season 46: "Governor's Cup")	TV5 / One Sports / PBA Rush	December 8
The Gifted	2021	Graduation	GMA	December 20
Oh My Dad!	2021 (TV5 / One Screen)	Happy Together	GMA	December 26

=== State-owned networks ===
Show	Last aired	Retitled as/Season/Notes	Channel	Return date
Isumbong Mo Kay Tulfo	2006 (RPN)	Same (2nd incarnation)	PTV	June 12
IBC Headliners	2011	Same (2nd incarnation)	IBC	October 25
Maharlika Pilipinas Basketball League	2021 (A2Z)	Same (Invitational)	IBC / TAP Sports	December 11

=== Minor networks ===
Show	Last aired	Retitled as/Season/Notes	Channel	Return date
Responde: Tugon Aksyon Ngayon	2019	Responde: Mata ng Mamamayan	Net 25	November 20
CLTV 36 Balitaan	2013	Same (2nd incarnation)	CLTV	Unknown

=== Other channels ===
Show	Last aired	Retitled as/Season/Notes	Channel	Return date
State of the Nation with Jessica Soho	2021	State of the Nation	GMA News TV (now GTV)	January 4
Game Ka Na Ba?	2021 (2nd incarnation; season 1)	Same (2nd incarnation; season 2)	Jeepney TV	January 4
Mind S-Cool	2020 (CNN Philippines)	Same (season 3)	Colours / One PH	January 16 (Colours); January 17 (One PH)
BBC My World	2020	Same	One News	January 24
Geek and Gamers Guide	2020	Same (season 2)	One Sports	January 24
Rising Sun	2021	Same (season 2)	GMA News TV (now GTV)	January 25
Dobol B sa GMA	2020 (GMA)	Dobol B TV	GTV	February 22
Dobol B sa News TV	2021 (GMA News TV)	Dobol B TV	GTV	February 22
GMA Regional TV Weekend News	2021 (GMA News TV)	Regional TV Weekend News	GTV	February 27
News TV Live	2021	News Live	GTV	March 27
Rig 45	2021	Same (season 2)	TAP Edge	April 7
Chinese News TV (CNTV)	2020 (IBC)	Chinatown News TV (CNTV)	ANC	April 12
Game Ka Na Ba?	2021 (2nd incarnation; season 2)	Same (2nd incarnation; season 3)	Jeepney TV	April 19
Metro Manila Ngayon	2016	Same (2nd incarnation)	DZRH News Television (now DZRH TV)	May 3
Making It	2018 (Jack TV)	Same (season 2)	ETC	May 8
Omaga-Diaz Report	2021	Omaga-Diaz Reports	TeleRadyo	May 15
G Diaries	2021	Same (season 8)	ANC / Kapamilya Channel / Metro Channel	May 16
The Purge	2021	Same (season 2)	TAP Edge	June 4
Chicago Med	2021	Same (season 2)	TAP Edge	June 8
Endless Love	2021	Same (season 2)	ETC	June 13
National Collegiate Athletic Association	2020 (Liga / S+A)	Same (season 96)	GTV	June 13
Bulletproof	2021	Same (season 9)	TAP Edge	June 13
American Greed	2021	Same (season 12)	TAP Edge	June 20
A Discovery of Witches	2021	Same (season 2)	TAP Edge	June 24
Premier Volleyball League	2020 (Liga / S+A; season 3: "Collegiate Conference")	Same (season 4: "Open Conference"; season 17 as Shakey's V-League)	One Sports / One Sports+	July 17
Pinoy Aklatan: Filipino Stories for Kids (Pinoy A+)	2021	Same (season 2)	GTV	July 18
Real Talk: The Heart of the Matter	2021	Same (season 2)	Jeepney TV / Kapamilya Channel	July 25
CHInoyTV	2020 (ANC)	Chinese by Blood, Filipino by Heart (season 1)	CNN Philippines	August 8
Game Ka Na Ba?	2021 (2nd incarnation; season 3)	Same (2ne incarnation; season 4)	Jeepney TV	August 23
KKK'	2018 (DZRH News Television)	Ka-Kwentuhan Karen	DZRH TV	September 11
Love Island USA	2021	Same (season 2)	TAP TV	September 27
Keeping Up with the Kardashians	2021	Same (season 18)	TAP TV	September 28
National Football League	2020 (5 Plus / One Sports)	Same (2021 season)	Premier Sports	October 1
Riviera	2021	Same (season 2)	TAP Edge	October 4
Keeping Up with the Kardashians	2021	Same (season 19)	TAP TV	October 19
Hell's Kitchen USA	2021	Same (season 18)	TAP TV	October 23
Kid Sine	2020 (Yey!)	Kid Sine Presents	Jeepney TV	November 7
Christmas Cartoon Festival Presents	2021 (GMA)	Same	GTV	November 15
Chicago Med	2021	Same (season 3)	TAP Edge	November 16
Keeping Up with the Kardashians	2021	Same (season 20)	TAP TV	November 16
The Sinner	2021	Same (season 2)	TAP Edge	December 30
Jay Leno's Garage	2020	Same (season 2)	TAP Sports	December 31
Adbokasiya	2016 (DZRH News Television)	Same (2nd incarnation)	DZRH TV	Unknown

=== Video streaming services ===
Show	Last aired	Retitled as/Season/Notes	Service	Return date
Ben X Jim	2020 (YouTube; Regal Entertainment)	Same (season 2)	Upstream PH	February 12
Coke Studio Philippines	2020	Same (season 5: "Itodo Mo, Beat Mo")	YouTube (Coke Studio Philippines)	May 17
Click, Like, Share	2021	Same (season 2)	iWantTFC	September 3
Hoy, Love You!	2021	Hoy, Love You Two	iWantTFC	September 11
Quaranthings	2020 (YouTube; Ride or Die)	Same (season 2)	Upstream PH	November 26

== Programs transferring networks ==
=== Major networks ===
Date	Show	No. of seasons	Moved from	Moved to
January 24	John en Shirley	—N/a	ABS-CBN (now Kapamilya Channel)	TV5 (as John en Ellen)
March 10	Maharlika Pilipinas Basketball League	3	Liga (now defunct) / S+A	A2Z
March 20	Aja! Aja! Tayo	—N/a	TV5	A2Z / Kapamilya Channel (as Aja! Aja! Tayo sa Jeju)
March 20	Encounter	—N/a	ABS-CBN (now Kapamilya Channel)	TV5 (as the Philippine adaptation)
April 3	JESCOM Holy Week Specials	—N/a	ABS-CBN (now Kapamilya Channel)	GMA
September 4	Cardcaptor Sakura: Clear Card	—N/a	Yey!	A2Z
October 16	Pera Paraan	—N/a	GTV	GMA
December 12	Diyos at Bayan	—N/a	GMA / GMA News TV (now GTV)	A2Z
December 26	Oh My Dad!	—N/a	One Screen (now defunct) / TV5	GMA (as Happy Together)

=== State-owned networks ===
Date	Show	No. of seasons	Moved from	Moved to
June 12	Isumbong Mo Kay Tulfo	—N/a	RPN (now CNN Philippines)	PTV
December 11	Maharlika Pilipinas Basketball League	(as Invitational)	A2Z	IBC / TAP Sports

=== Other channels ===
Date	Show	No. of seasons	Moved from	Moved to
January 4	Chicago Fire	1	Jack TV (now defunct)	TAP Edge
January 5	Dateline NBC	—N/a	Talk TV (now CNN Philippines)	TAP Edge
January 5	NBC Nightly News	—N/a	TAP TV	TAP Edge
January 6	Chicago P.D.	1	CT (now defunct)	TAP Edge
January 7	The Magicians	1	ETC	TAP Edge
January 16	Mind S-Cool	3	CNN Philippines	Colours
January 17	Mind S-Cool	—N/a	CNN Philippines	One PH
February 16	Impact Wrestling	—N/a	TAP Edge	TAP Sports
April 12	CNTV	—N/a	IBC (as Chinese News TV)	ANC (as Chinatown News TV)
May 8	Making It	2	Jack TV (now defunct)	ETC
June 13	National Collegiate Athletic Association	96	Liga (now defunct) / S+A	GTV
July 2	E! True Hollywood Story	16	2nd Avenue (now defunct) / E! Philippines (now BEAM TV) / Velvet (now defunct)	TAP TV
July 3	Hell's Kitchen USA	17	2nd Avenue (now defunct)	TAP TV
July 3	Top Chef	13	ETC	TAP TV
July 6	Keeping Up with the Kardashians	16	ETC	TAP TV
July 6	Revenge Body with Khloé Kardashian	1	ETC	TAP TV
July 7	The Bold Type	1	ETC	TAP TV
July 17	Premier Volleyball League	4 (17 as Shakey's V-League)	Liga (now defunct) / S+A	One Sports
August 8	CHInoyTV	1 (as Chinese by Blood, Filipino by Heart)	ANC	CNN Philippines
October 1	National Football League	—N/a	5 Plus (now One Sports)	Premier Sports
October 2	Siyensikat	—N/a	GMA News TV (now GTV)	CNN Philippines
October 25	Stories of Hope	—N/a	GMA	GTV
October 26	NBC Nightly News	—N/a	TAP Edge	TAP TV
October 26	On Record	—N/a	GMA	GTV
October 27	Tunay na Buhay	—N/a	GMA	GTV
October 28	Reporter's Notebook	—N/a	GMA	GTV
November 7	Kid Sine	—N/a	Yey! (now defunct)	Jeepney TV (as Kid Sine Presents)
November 15	Christmas Cartoon Festival Presents	—N/a	GMA	GTV

=== Video streaming services ===
Date	Show	No. of seasons	Moved from	Moved to
February 12	Ben X Jim	2	YouTube (Regal Entertainment)	Upstream PH
November 26	Quaranthings	2	YouTube (Ride or Die)	Upstream PH

== Milestone episodes ==
The following shows that made their milestone episodes in 2021:

Show	Network	Episode #	Episode title	Episode air date
Ang sa Iyo ay Akin	A2Z / Jeepney TV / Kapamilya Channel	100th	"Bagong Kaguluhan"	January 1
Chika, Besh!	TV5	100th	"Maui Taylor"	January 7
Prima Donnas	GMA	200th	"Mayi, I am Your Father"	January 7
Mars Pa More	GMA	300th	"300th Episode"	January 15
Maalaala Mo Kaya	A2Z / Kapamilya Channel	1,300th	"Tattoo"	January 16
FPJ's Ang Probinsyano	A2Z / Cine Mo! / Kapamilya Channel	1,300th	"Panaghoy"	January 28
Walang Hanggang Paalam	A2Z / Jeepney TV / Kapamilya Channel	100th	"Hulihin"	February 12
Bagong Umaga	A2Z / Kapamilya Channel	100th	"The Plan"	March 12
Fill in the Bank	TV5	100th	"Maynard vs. Benjie"	March 24
Daddy's Gurl	GMA	100th	"Barakbakan 2"	May 15
FPJ's Ang Probinsyano	A2Z / Cine Mo! / Kapamilya Channel / TV5	1,400th	"Lusob"	June 21
Unang Hirit	GMA	6,000th	"6,000th Episode"	August 6
Huwag Kang Mangamba	A2Z / Kapamilya Channel / TV5	100th	"Suhol"	August 10
Init sa Magdamag	A2Z / Jeepney TV / Kapamilya Channel / TV5	100th	"Closer To Truth"	September 3
Niña Niño	TV5	100th	"Regrets"	September 20
iBilib	GMA	500th	"500th Episode"	October 17
FPJ's Ang Probinsyano	A2Z / Cine Mo! / Kapamilya Channel / TV5	1,500th	"Labanan"	November 8
La Vida Lena	A2Z / Jeepney TV / Kapamilya Channel / TV5	100th	"Damay"	November 12

== Finales ==
=== Major networks ===
==== A2Z ====
The following are programs that ended on A2Z:

- January 15: Dog of Flanders (Kidz Toon Time)
- February 7: I Can See Your Voice season 3
- February 19: The Adventures of Tom Sawyer (Kidz Toon Time)
- February 26: Charlotte (Kidz Toon Time)
- March 14: Pinoy Big Brother: Connect
- March 19: Ang sa Iyo ay Akin
- March 31: Remi, Nobody's Girl (Kidz Toon Time) and The Good Son
- April 16: Walang Hanggang Paalam
- April 30: Bagong Umaga and The Trapp Family Singers (Kidz Toon Time)
- May 1: Pororo the Little Penguin (Kidz Weekend) and Tayo the Little Bus (Kidz Weekend)
- May 23: Almost Paradise (season 1)
- May 28: Judy Abbott (Kidz Toon Time)
- May 30: Your Face Sounds Familiar season 3
- June 12: Aja! Aja! Tayo sa Jeju
- June 25: Count Your Lucky Stars
- June 26: Paano Kita Mapasasalamatan?
- June 27: Iba 'Yan!
- July 3: Masha and the Bear (Kidz Weekend) and PJ Masks (Kidz Weekend)
- July 16: Marco (Kidz Toon Time)
- July 23: Magpahanggang Wakas
- July 24: Bawal Lumabas: The Series
- August 1: He's Into Her (season 1)
- August 6: Anne of Green Gables (Kidz Toon Time)
- August 28: Doraemon (2005; Kidz Weekend)
- August 29: Click, Like, Share (season 1)
- September 10: Init sa Magdamag and Peter Pan and Wendy (Kidz Toon Time)
- September 11: Hoy, Love You!
- September 17: Little Women II (Kidz Toon Time)
- September 26: Click, Like, Share (season 2)
- October 3: Legends of Dawn: The Sacred Stone
- October 10: Everybody, Sing! season 1
- October 16: Unloving U
- October 17: Meow: The Secret Boy
- October 29: Naruto: Shippuden season 4 (Kidz Toon Time)
- October 30: Aksyon Time (season 1) and Cardcaptor Sakura: Clear Card (Kidz Weekend)
- November 12: Dolce Amore and Huwag Kang Mangamba
- November 26: Power Rangers Ninja Steel (Kidz Toon Time)
- December 12: Melting Me Softly
- December 26: Ipaglaban Mo!
- December 31: Primetime Zinema (A2Z Zinema)

===== Stopped airing =====
Program	Last airing	Resumed airing	Reason
Balitang A2Z	July 30	August 16	Temporary suspension of broadcast due to COVID-19 related concerns and their hampered operations.
Inazuma Eleven GO: Chrono Stone	December 31 (Kidz Toon Time)	January 9, 2022 (Kidz Weekend)	Program transferred its timeslot due to the changes in programming schedule line-up.

==== GMA ====
The following are programs that ended on GMA Network:

- January 2: Temptation of Wife (rerun)
- January 8: Christmas Cartoon Festival Presents
- January 15: Encantadia (rerun) and Wolfblood (season 2; rerun)
- January 16: Ika-6 na Utos (rerun; remaining episodes moved to Heart of Asia beginning February 1)
- January 31: Pororo: The Racing Adventure
- February 4: VIP
- February 7: Invincible Teacher season 2 (rerun)
- February 9: Alisto
- February 12: My Korean Jagiya (rerun)
- February 19: Prima Donnas (season 1) and The Worst Witch
- February 21: Wagas (rerun)
- February 27: Fates & Furies
- March 8: Front Row
- March 12: Anak ni Waray vs. Anak ni Biday and Dragon Ball Super (season 1; rerun)
- March 13: Angry Birds Blues
- March 19: Love of My Life
- March 21: Yo-kai Watch (season 2; rerun)
- March 26: Bilangin ang Bituin sa Langit
- March 31: Magkaagaw
- April 16: Heirs of the Night
- April 22: The Romantic Doctor 2
- April 23: I Can See You (season 2)
- April 24: The Blooming Treasure
- May 2: The Clash (seasons 1–3 "The Final Clash" episode; rerun)
- May 21: Babawiin Ko ang Lahat
- May 22: The Desire
- May 29: Pepito Manaloto: Kuwento Kuwento
- June 4: Owe My Love
- June 6: Centerstage
- June 12: The Gifted
- June 13: Ben 10: Ultimate Alien and Knock Out (rerun)
- June 18: Heartful Café
- June 26: Celebrity Bluff (rerun)
- July 2: First Yaya
- July 10: Her Private Life
- July 22: The Penthouse (season 1)
- July 23: Ang Dalawang Mrs. Real (rerun)
- July 24: Agimat ng Agila (season 1)
- July 29: Lie After Lie
- July 30: Innamorata (rerun) and Mako Mermaids (rerun)
- July 31: Karelasyon (rerun) and One Piece season 11 (rerun)
- August 8: In Touch with Dr. Charles Stanley
- August 13: Slam Dunk (rerun)
- August 27: The World Between Us (season 1)
- August 28: Game of Affection
- September 4: Catch Me Out Philippines
- September 7: Sirkus (rerun)
- September 10: Ang Dalawang Ikaw
- September 11: Detective Conan season 8
- September 16: The Sand Princess
- September 24: Eat Well, Live Well, Stay Well (seasons 1 and 2), Endless Love (2010; rerun) and God of Lost Fantasy
- September 25: Angry Birds Stella (rerun)
- September 27: Biyahe ni Drew
- October 8: The Penthouse (season 2)
- October 9: Oh My Baby
- October 18: Stories of Hope
- October 19: On Record
- October 20: Tunay na Buhay
- October 21: Reporter's Notebook
- October 23: Nagbabagang Luha
- October 29: The Bureau of Magical Things (season 1)
- October 30: Simba: The King Lion
- November 4: Scripting Your Destiny
- November 5: When the Weather Is Fine
- November 12: The Good Daughter (rerun) and Legal Wives
- November 16: Makulay ang Buhay (season 2)
- November 19: Tale of the Nine Tailed
- November 21: Hunter × Hunter (season 3; 2011; rerun)
- December 3: Wolfblood (season 3; rerun)
- December 5: Knorr Nutri-Sarap Kitchen
- December 16: Mr. Queen
- December 17: Love Beyond Time and To Have & to Hold
- December 19: The Clash season 4
- December 30: Movie Holidates

===== Stopped airing =====
Program	Last airing	Resumed airing	Reason
Pinas Sarap	January 30	March 14, 2026	Series break.
Hunter × Hunter (2011; rerun)	March 7	March 22 (GTV; seasons 1 and 2); June 19 (season 3)	Program replaced by Detective Conan (season 8) on March 13.
Centerstage	April 11	May 9	Temporary suspension of tapings due to the COVID-19 pandemic in the Philippines.
Karelasyon (rerun)	April 17	April 26	Temporary replaced by the debuting The Desire on its timeslot.
Eat Well, Live Well, Stay Well	April 23	July 9	Season break.
Catch Me Out Philippines	April 24	July 31	Temporary suspension of tapings due to the COVID-19 pandemic in the Philippines.
Angry Birds Toons (rerun)	August 29	October 2	Series break.

==== TV5 ====
The following are programs that ended on TV5:

- January 1: Paano ang Pasko?
- January 9: Usapang Real Life
- January 10: I Got You
- January 17: Pawn Stars, Riverdale season 1, Sunday 'Kada (season 1) and Sunday Noontime Live!
- January 22: Angel Heart
- January 23: Ghost Adventures (season 2)
- January 29: Reply 1988
- January 31: Onstage
- February 5: Marimar
- February 15: Ate ng Ate Ko
- February 16: Stay-In Love (season 1)
- February 17: Sleepless: The Series
- February 18: Hapi House
- February 19: Radyo5 Network News and Red Envelope
- March 2: TVflix
- March 4: Sine Asya
- March 5: Primetime Sine Festival
- March 6: Ancient Aliens and The Kasambahays
- March 13: Bangon Talentadong Pinoy (season 1)
- March 14: Pinoy Big Brother: Connect
- March 19: Ang sa Iyo ay Akin
- March 21: Kagat ng Dilim (2020)
- March 30: Bawal na Game Show
- March 31: Fill in the Bank and Paano ang Pangako?
- April 3: Power to Unite
- April 5: Istorifik: Pidol's Kuwentong Fantastik (rerun)
- April 7: Action Spectacular
- April 9: Fan Faves
- April 11: Black Lightning season 1
- April 16: Walang Hanggang Paalam
- April 23: Betty sa NY
- April 24: Oh My Dad!
- April 30: Pidol's Wonderland (rerun) and The Beauty Inside
- May 2: John en Ellen (season 1)
- May 7: Batibot (rerun) and The Loyal Wife
- May 8: Born to Be a Star (season 2) and Sari-Sari Original Telemovie
- May 30: Gen Z
- June 12: 1000 Heartbeats: Pintig Pinoy and The Apprentice: ONE Championship Edition
- June 25: Count Your Lucky Stars and The Secret Life of My Secretary
- July 18: The Game Weekend
- July 30: María Mercedes
- August 1: John en Ellen (season 2)
- August 15: Wanted: Ang Serye
- August 29: Breaking the Magician's Code and FPJ: Da King
- September 3: Tierra de reyes
- September 10: Init sa Magdamag
- September 11: Puto (2021 television remake) and The Wall Philippines (season 1)
- October 1: Idol in Action and The Powerpuff Girls (1998; rerun)
- October 2: Gotham season 1 (rerun), Rolling In It Philippines (season 1) and Stay-In Love (season 1; rerun)
- October 16: Courage the Cowardly Dog (rerun)
- October 17: Ben 10 (2005; rerun), Codename: Kids Next Door (rerun) and Samurai Jack
- October 22: Welcome to Waikiki
- October 30: Encounter (Philippine adaptation)
- November 7: POPinoy
- November 12: Huwag Kang Mangamba
- November 14: POPinoy PopDates
- November 21: Hollywood Movies
- December 18: Di Na Muli

===== Stopped airing =====
Program	Last airing	Resumed airing	Reason
Codename: Kids Next Door (rerun)	January 5	March 8	Series break.
Codename: Kids Next Door (rerun)	April 14	August 14	Series break.
Ted Failon at DJ Chacha sa Radyo5	February 19	October 4	Affected by the channel's programming schedule lineup changes.
Courage the Cowardly Dog (rerun)	March 5	August 14	Series break.
Dexter's Laboratory (rerun)	March 31	October 4	Series break.
Lifetime Original Movies	April 8	July 10	Programming block on break.
Rated Korina	April 24	June 20	Season break.
Wanted: Ang Serye	May 1	June 27	Season break.
Hollywood Movies	June 6	November 14	Programming block on break.
Breaking the Magician's Code	June 20	August 15	Series break.
Sine Todo	June 26	August 14	Programming block on break.
Sine Todo	November 14	November 28	Programming block on break.
FPJ: Da King	July 11	August 8	Pre-empted by the 46th season of Philippine Basketball Association.
Sine Spotlight	July 11	August 22	Pre-empted by the 46th season of Philippine Basketball Association.
Tierra de reyes	July 23	August 9	Pre-empted by the 2020 Summer Olympics.
Reina de corazones	July 23	August 9	Pre-empted by the 2020 Summer Olympics.

===== Cancelled =====
- January 8: Chika, Besh! (reason: Program failed to renew its contract resulting to the cancellation. Replaced by the extension of TV5 Kids block beginning January 11.)

=== State-owned networks ===
==== PTV ====
The following are programs that ended on People's Television Network:

- August 31: Oras ng Himala
- September 24: Counterpoint with Secretary Salvador Panelo

===== Stopped airing =====
Program	Last airing	Resumed airing	Reason
Sentro Balita	January 8	January 27	Temporary suspension of broadcast due to "quarantine safety protocol issues" on January 11–26.
Sentro Balita	March 3	May 3	Temporary suspension of broadcast due to "quarantine safety protocol issues" on March 3.
Sentro Balita	August 5	September 6	Temporary suspension of broadcast due to enhanced community quarantine in Metro Manila.
PTV News Tonight	January 8	January 27	Temporary suspension of broadcast due to "quarantine safety protocol issues" on January 11–26.
PTV News Tonight	March 12	May 3	Temporary suspension of broadcast due to "quarantine safety protocol issues" on March 15.
PTV News Tonight	August 5	August 23	Temporary suspension of broadcast due to enhanced community quarantine in Metro Manila.
Rise and Shine Pilipinas	March 3	April 5	Temporary suspension of broadcast due to "quarantine safety protocol issues" on March 3.
Rise and Shine Pilipinas	August 9	August 23	Temporary suspension of broadcast due to enhanced community quarantine in Metro Manila.
Ulat Bayan Weekend	March 14	April 4	Temporary suspension of broadcast due to "quarantine safety protocol issues" on March 15.
PTV Balita Ngayon	March 16	April 4	Temporary suspension of broadcast due to "quarantine safety protocol issues" on March 17.
Ulat Bayan	March 16	April 5	Temporary suspension of broadcast due to "quarantine safety protocol issues" on March 17.
PTV Sports	August 5	August 23	Temporary suspension of broadcast due to enhanced community quarantine in Metro Manila.

==== IBC ====
The following are programs that ended on IBC:

- July 31: Oras ng Kings
- November 19: IBC Headliners (2nd incarnation)

===== Stopped airing =====
Program	Last airing	Resumed airing	Reason
Tutok 13	April 9	May 3	Temporary suspension of telecast due to "quarantine safety protocol issues".

=== Minor networks ===
- February 12: Eagle News International Filipino Edition on Net 25
- May 28: Eat's Singing Time on Net 25
- May 29: Ikaw ay Akin on Net 25
- August 9: Agila Pilipinas on Net 25
- August 13: Eagle News America on Net 25
- August 27: Pambansang Almusal on Net 25
- October 8: Piskante ng Bayan on Net 25
- October 15: Happy Time on Net 25
- November 26: Agila Probinsiya on Net 25

==== Unknown ====
- CineKabalen, Kalinga ni Ria Vergara, Lugud Fernandino, and Si Jay at Double J on CLTV 36
- Kesayasaya, Pelikwentuhan and Tagisan ng Galing on Net 25

==== Stopped airing ====
Program	Channel	Last airing	Resumed airing	Reason
Ito Ang Balita Weekend Edition	UNTV	March 27	May 15	Temporary suspension of telecast due to "quarantine safety protocol issues".
Agila Probinsiya	Net 25	November 26	January 29, 2022	Program on break.

=== Other channels ===
- January 1: Everywhere I Go (ETCerye) on ETC
- January 1: i-Witness (Power Block), State of the Nation with Jessica Soho and Usap Tayo: Super Kuwentuhan with Mark and Susan (Dobol B sa News TV) on GMA News TV (now GTV)
- January 1: Switch on Heart of Asia
- January 1: Game Ka Na Ba? (2nd incarnation; season 1) on Jeepney TV
- January 1: Carpool on One Screen
- January 1: Bella Bandida on Sari-Sari Channel
- January 3: StarGazeMuzik on Hallypop
- January 4: Paano ang Pasko? on One Screen
- January 4: NBC Nightly News on TAP TV
- January 6: Sportspage on One PH
- January 7: Budoy (rerun) on Jeepney TV
- January 7: The Huddle on One PH
- January 8: A Love to Last (rerun) and Give Love on Christmas (rerun) on Jeepney TV
- January 8: Jumpball on One PH
- January 8: Reply 1988 on One Screen
- January 8: Sportspage on One Sports, One Sports+ and PBA Rush
- January 9: Two Wives (2014; rerun) on Jeepney TV
- January 10: I Got You on One Screen
- January 10: Usapang Real Life on Colours
- January 10: Glow Up and Holiday Gifts on GMA News TV (now GTV)
- January 15: Ang Pinaka, News TV Quick Response Team, Stairway to Heaven and Where Stars Land on GMA News TV (now GTV)
- January 15: Moribito Final on Heart of Asia
- January 15: Forevermore (rerun) on Jeepney TV
- January 15: The General's Daughter on Kapamilya Channel
- January 16: Oh My Dad! (season 1) on One Screen
- January 17: Sunday 'Kada (season 1) and Sunday Noontime Live! on Colours
- January 18: Born Beautiful: The Series on One Screen
- January 22: Emperor: Ruler of the Mask and Into the World Again on Heart of Asia
- January 22: Unconditional on One Screen
- January 23: Saturday Updates on DZRH News Television
- January 24: World on Fire on TAP Edge
- January 29: Amaya on Heart of Asia
- January 29: Lorenzo's Time, Mula sa Puso (2011), The Greatest Love (rerun) and The Killer Bride on Jeepney TV
- January 29: At Home with GMA Regional TV (GMA Regional TV Strip), GMA Regional TV Early Edition (GMA Regional TV Strip), GMA Regional TV Live! (GMA Regional TV Strip) and Mornings with GMA Regional TV (GMA Regional TV Strip) on GMA News TV (now GTV)
- February 1: Saturday Night Live season 42 on Solar Sports
- February 2: Pokémon the Series: XYZ on GMA News TV (now GTV)
- February 5: Rakshasa Street on Heart of Asia
- February 5: Go Back Couple on Kapamilya Channel
- February 7: Seasons of Love and U-Prince on GMA News TV (now GTV)
- February 7: Tanging Yaman (rerun) on Jeepney TV
- February 7: I Can See Your Voice season 3 on Kapamilya Channel
- February 8: Bulletproof (season 1) on TAP Edge
- February 10: WWE Afterburn on TAP Sports
- February 11: WWE Main Event on TAP Sports
- February 12: Anna KareNina (2013), Nakee and Super Twins on Heart of Asia
- February 12: Goodbye Mr. Black and Story of Yanxi Palace on Kapamilya Channel
- February 12: Love You Two on One Screen
- February 12: This Week in WWE on TAP Sports
- February 12: The Three Sides of Ana (rerun) on Telenovela Channel
- February 14: Flame of Recca and Idol sa Kusina on GMA News TV (now GTV)
- February 14: One News Now on One PH
- February 16: Ate ng Ate Ko on One Screen
- February 17: Stay-In Love (season 1) on One Screen
- February 19: Furious Fire on One Screen
- February 20: Mind S-Cool (season 3) on Colours
- February 20: GMA Regional TV Weekend News on GMA News TV (now GTV)
- February 21: News TV Live on GMA News TV (now GTV)
- February 21: Charming Girl and Mr. Player on Heart of Asia
- February 21: Mind S-Cool (season 3) on One PH
- February 25: A Discovery of Witches (season 1) on TAP Edge
- February 26: Man x Man and While You Were Sleeping on Heart of Asia
- February 26: Honesto (rerun) on Jeepney TV
- February 26: EZ Shop on One Sports
- February 27: Kalderoke on Kapamilya Channel
- February 27: Saturday Night Live season 43 on Solar Sports
- February 28: Showbiz Pa More! on Jeepney TV
- February 28: NBA Spotlight on One Sports
- March 3: Gangs of London (season 1) on TAP Edge
- March 5: Secret Love Online on GTV
- March 5: Little Champ on Jeepney TV
- March 5: I Have a Lover on Kapamilya Channel
- March 6: Hiwaga ng Kambat on Jeepney TV
- March 6: Pop Babies, Robocar Poli and The Adventures of Tom Sawyer on Kapamilya Channel
- March 7: K-pop Star on Hallypop
- March 7: Bayani and Hiraya Manawari on Kapamilya Channel
- March 8: Riviera (season 1) on TAP Edge
- March 9: Treadstone on TAP Edge
- March 12: Rising Sun on GTV
- March 12: Hana Nochi Hare on Kapamilya Channel
- March 12: The Purge (season 1) on TAP Edge
- March 13: eXes and whYs with Pops and Martin on Colours
- March 14: Pinoy Big Brother: Connect on Kapamilya Channel
- March 19: Ang sa Iyo ay Akin on Jeepney TV and Kapamilya Channel
- March 20: Making It (season 1) on ETC
- March 21: Pangako Sa 'Yo (2015; rerun) on Jeepney TV
- March 21: Geeks & Gamers Guide on One Sports
- March 22: Kagat ng Dilim (2020) on Sari-Sari Channel
- March 26: Endless Love (season 1; ETCerye) on ETC
- March 26: The Story of Us on Jeepney TV
- March 28: Chibi Maruko-chan on Heart of Asia
- March 30: Transplant (season 1) on TAP Edge
- March 31: The Lost Recipe on GTV
- March 31: Love Alert, The Lost Recipe and Ugly Ducking on Heart of Asia
- March 31: Game Ka Na Ba? (2nd incarnation; season 2) on Jeepney TV
- March 31: Mother and The Good Son on Kapamilya Channel
- April 1: Bagani and Since I Found You (rerun) on Jeepney TV
- April 1: Paano ang Pangako? on One Screen
- April 1: Chicago Justice on TAP Edge
- April 2: The Magicians (season 1) on TAP Edge
- April 6: Bleach (season 1) on GTV
- April 9: Fight for My Way on Heart of Asia
- April 9: Designated Survivor season 1 and Furious Fire on One Screen
- April 14: Chicago P.D. season 1 on TAP Edge
- April 16: Fire of Eternal Love and My Daughter, Geum Sa-wol on Heart of Asia
- April 16: Hanggang Saan, Kahit Puso'y Masugatan and Walang Hanggang Paalam on Jeepney TV
- April 16: Walang Hanggang Paalam on Kapamilya Channel
- April 16: Basketball Science on One Sports
- April 18: Real Talk: The Heart of the Matter (season 1) on Kapamilya Channel
- April 23: Boys Over Flowers and I Can See You (season 2) on GTV
- April 23: I Can See You (season 2) on Heart of Asia
- April 24: Best of Imbestigador and The Legend of Paranormal Stories on GTV
- April 25: Swak na Swak on ANC
- April 25: Becoming Pinoy and Ben 10: Alien Force on GTV
- April 25: Boys' Lockdown on Heart of Asia
- April 25: Real Talk: The Heart of the Matter (season 1) on Jeepney TV
- April 30: Coffee Break and MBC Network News (evening and late-night editions) on DZRH News Television
- April 30: Pure Intention on GTV
- April 30: Dyosa on Jeepney TV
- April 30: Bagong Umaga on Kapamilya Channel
- May 1: Kadenang Ginto (season 1) on Kapamilya Channel
- May 1: Kape at Salita on TeleRadyo
- May 3: John en Ellen (season 1) on One Screen
- May 4: Chicago Med (season 1) on TAP Edge
- May 7: Love Actually on GTV
- May 7: Angel's Last Mission on Heart of Asia
- May 7: Passion and Power (rerun) on Telenovela Channel
- May 8: Masked Singer Pilipinas season 1 on Sari-Sari Channel
- May 8: Headline Pilipinas Weekend (Saturday edition) on TeleRadyo
- May 9: Ipaglaban Mo! on TeleRadyo
- May 9: Born to Be a Star (season 2) on Sari-Sari Channel
- May 14: The Crown Princess on Heart of Asia
- May 14: Gangnam Beauty on Kapamilya Channel
- May 14: The Beauty Inside on One Screen
- May 15: Boses ng Kabataan on DZRH News Television
- May 16: Secret Seven on Heart of Asia
- May 17: Guest Star on ETC
- May 21: Matters of Fact on ANC
- May 21: Strong Girl Bong-soon on Heart of Asia
- May 21: Pure Love (2014; rerun) on Jeepney TV
- May 21: Destined to be Yours on One Screen
- May 23: Almost Paradise (season 1) and Luckyng Tulong on Kapamilya Channel
- May 28: Suits on Kapamilya Channel
- May 28: Angel Heart on One Screen
- May 30: Luckyng Tulong on Cine Mo!
- May 30: Your Face Sounds Familiar season 3 on Kapamilya Channel
- June 4: First Yaya on GTV
- June 4: Buena Familia, Heartful Café (remaining episodes continued via GMA), Ika-6 na Utos and Little Nanay on Heart of Asia
- June 5: I Feel U on Jeepney TV
- June 6: I Dare You (rerun) on Jeepney TV
- June 6: Gen Z on One Screen
- June 9: Intelligence on TAP Edge
- June 11: Funny Ka, Pare Ko (rerun) on Cine Mo!
- June 11: All of Me (rerun) on Jeepney TV
- June 12: Aja! Aja! Tayo sa Jeju on Kapamilya Channel
- June 13: Hunter × Hunter (seasons 1 and 2; 2011) on GTV
- June 14: I Feel U on Cinema One
- June 14: The Apprentice: ONE Championship Edition on One Sports
- June 14: Chicago Fire season 1 on TAP Edge
- June 18: The Love Knot and Two Spirits' Love on GTV
- June 18: Are You Human? on Heart of Asia
- June 19: Charlotte and Kongsuni and Friends on Kapamilya Channel
- June 25: Hayat (ETCerye) on ETC
- June 25: Count Your Lucky Stars on Kapamilya Channel
- June 25: Gotham season 2 on One Screen
- June 25: Fall into Temptation on Telenovela Channel
- June 26: Paano Kita Mapasasalamatan? and Pasión de Amor (rerun) on Jeepney TV
- June 26: Paano Kita Mapasasalamatan? on Kapamilya Channel
- June 27: Game of the Gens (GOTG) on GTV
- June 27: Iba 'Yan! on Jeepney TV and Kapamilya Channel
- June 30: Urban Myths (seasons 1 to 4) on TAP Edge
- July 2: First Yaya, Princess Hours (2017 Thai version; rerun) and Secret Garden on Heart of Asia
- July 2: Playhouse (rerun) on Jeepney TV
- July 9: Madam Pushy and I and Taste of Love on Heart of Asia
- July 9: The Loyal Wife on One Screen
- July 9: Sightless Love on Telenovela Channel
- July 10: Making It (season 2) on ETC
- July 10: Dream Dad (rerun) on Jeepney TV
- July 15: The Huddle on One Sports
- July 16: Legend of Fuyao on Heart of Asia
- July 16: Game Ka Na Ba? (2nd incarnation; season 3) on Jeepney TV
- July 16: Tierra de reyes on One Screen
- July 16: The Neighbor (rerun) on Telenovela Channel
- July 18: The Game Weekend on One News, One Sports and One Sports+
- July 19: Balitang Amianan (Regional TV Strip) on GTV
- July 20: Balitang Bisdak (Regional TV Strip) on GTV
- July 20: Wanted: Ang Serye on One Screen
- July 21: One Western Visayas (Regional TV Strip) on GTV
- July 22: One Mindanao (Regional TV Strip) on GTV
- July 22: The Nationals on One Sports
- July 23: Balitang Bicolandia (Regional TV Strip) on GTV
- July 23: Misty on Heart of Asia
- July 23: Meteor Garden (2001 Taiwanese version; rerun) and Sana Dalawa ang Puso on Jeepney TV
- July 23: Magpahanggang Wakas and Two Cops on Kapamilya Channel
- July 23: Jumpball on One Sports
- July 24: UFC Fight Night on One Sports
- July 24: Regional TV Weekend News on GTV
- July 24: Bawal Lumabas: The Series on Kapamilya Channel
- July 25: Pusong Pinoy sa Amerika (season 16) on GTV
- July 25: Gameboys (season 1) on Heart of Asia
- July 25: Art Jam on Kapamilya Channel
- July 26: Pinoy Star Stories on Viva TV (now Viva Cinema)
- July 27: ODD Creatures Our Cue on Viva TV (now Viva Cinema)
- July 28: Halo Halo Sessions on Air on Viva TV (now Viva Cinema)
- July 29: COBRA (season 1) on TAP Edge
- July 29: Emo, Hataw, Jam with John, Rak 'En Roll and Sisters Forever (2Gether Poorever) on Viva TV (now Viva Cinema)
- July 30: Prince of Wolf on GTV
- July 30: Pusong Ligaw (rerun) on Jeepney TV
- July 31: Parasite Island on Kapamilya Channel
- July 31: Anong Ganap?, Covers, Fresh, Idol, OMG (Oh My Guardians), OPM Hits, OPM I Love, OPM I Love Weekend, Rak 'En Roll, Pinoy Jams, Playlist, Rap Sessions, Throwback, Top 5 and Tropang Torpe on Viva TV (now Viva Cinema)
- August 1: The King is in Love on Jeepney TV
- August 1: He's Into Her (season 1) on Kapamilya Channel
- August 1: Bulletproof (season 2) on TAP Edge
- August 6: Scarlet Heart on GTV
- August 6: My Absolute Boyfriend on Heart of Asia
- August 6: Nathaniel (rerun) on Jeepney TV
- August 6: The Purge (season 2) on TAP Edge
- August 7: Bodyguard on TAP Edge
- August 8: Rise Up Stronger on GTV
- August 8: Lingkod Aksyon on TeleRadyo
- August 10: Keeping Up with the Kardashians season 16 on TAP TV
- August 13: 100% Pinoy! on DepEd TV (GMA digital channel)
- August 13: FPJ's Ang Probinsyano: Ang Simula (seasons 1 to 3) on Jeepney TV
- August 14: Recreate on One News
- August 20: Oh My Ghost on Heart of Asia
- August 20: And I Love You So, May Minamahal (rerun), Meteor Garden II (2002 Taiwanese version; rerun) and Ysabella on Jeepney TV
- August 20: 100 Days My Prince on Kapamilya Channel
- August 21: Flex on GTV
- August 22: Connecting on TAP TV
- August 26: A Discovery of Witches (season 2) on TAP Edge
- August 27: Ilustrado on DepEd TV (GMA digital channel)
- August 27: Rising Sun and The World Between Us (season 1) on Heart of Asia
- August 28: Adventure Time and Dexter's Laboratory on CNN Philippines
- August 29: Uncle Grandpa and We Bare Bears on CNN Philippines
- August 29: JYP's Party People on Hallypop
- August 29: When a Snail Falls in Love on Heart of Asia
- August 29: Click, Like, Share (season 1) on Kapamilya Channel
- September 3: Rise Up Stronger on DepEd TV (GMA digital channel)
- September 3: In Time With You on GTV
- September 4: Tambalang KJ on DZRH TV
- September 10: Sky Castle (rerun) and The Last Empress on Heart of Asia
- September 10: Init sa Magdamag on Jeepney TV and Kapamilya Channel
- September 10: The Secret Life of My Secretary on One Screen
- September 11: Hoy, Love You! on Kapamilya Channel
- September 12: Puto (2021 television remake) on Sari-Sari Channel
- September 13: Chicago Fire season 2 on TAP Edge
- September 13: Love Island USA season 1 on TAP TV
- September 15: Chicago P.D. season 2 on TAP Edge
- September 15: Kuwentuhang Lokal on TeleRadyo
- September 16: Panahon Ko 'to!: Ang Game Show ng Buhay Ko (rerun) on Jeepney TV
- September 17: Strong Girl Bong-soon on DepEd TV (GMA digital channel)
- September 17: Extraordinary You and Temptation of Wife on Heart of Asia
- September 17: The Magicians (season 2) on TAP Edge
- September 21: Keeping Up with the Kardashians (season 17) on TAP TV
- September 24: Innocent Defendant on GTV
- September 24: Endless Love (2010) on Heart of Asia
- September 24: Bukas na Lang Kita Mamahalin and Princess and I (rerun) on Jeepney TV
- September 24: Black Lightning season 1 on One Screen
- September 25: Saturday Cinema Hits on GTV
- September 25: Oddbods on Kapamilya Channel
- September 26: Click, Like, Share (season 2) and Swak na Swak on Kapamilya Channel
- October 1: Criminal Minds on Kapamilya Channel
- October 1: Idol in Action on One PH
- October 1: Lying Heart and My Husband's Family on Telenovela Channel
- October 3: Legends of Dawn: The Sacred Stone on Kapamilya Channel
- October 3: Rolling In It Philippines (season 1) on Sari-Sari Channel
- October 3: Sagot Ko 'Yan on TeleRadyo
- October 5: Pop Talk on GTV
- October 6: Pera Paraan (New Normal: The Survival Guide) on GTV
- October 7: IRL on GTV
- October 8: Asintado on Kapamilya Channel
- October 8: Murder by Tsimis on One Screen
- October 8: The Candidate on Telenovela Channel
- October 9: 30 for 30 on One Sports
- October 10: Ngayon at Kailanman (rerun) on Jeepney TV
- October 10: Everybody, Sing! season 1 on Kapamilya Channel
- October 10: Clinica Flavier on One PH
- October 12: Keeping Up with the Kardashians season 18 on TAP TV
- October 15: Mr. Player on DepEd TV (GMA digital channel)
- October 15: Iisa Pa Lamang (rerun), My Binondo Girl (rerun) and Sandugo on Jeepney TV
- October 16: Unloving U on Kapamilya Channel
- October 16: Hell's Kitchen season 17 on TAP TV
- October 17: Only You and Real Talk: The Heart of the Matter (season 2) on Jeepney TV
- October 17: Meow: The Secret Boy and Real Talk: The Heart of the Matter (season 2) on Kapamilya Channel
- October 22: Hidden Love and Stairway to Heaven on Heart of Asia
- October 23: When Duty Calls on GTV
- October 23: Precious Hearts Romances Presents: Araw Gabi on Jeepney TV
- October 24: Buena Manong Balita (Sunday edition; Dobol B TV), Ben 10: Ultimate Alien, DZBB Executive Summary (Dobol B TV) and Super Balita sa Umaga Weekend (Sunday edition; Dobol B TV) on GTV
- October 24: ESPN's Boxing Greatest Fights on One Sports
- October 25: NBC Nightly News on TAP Edge
- October 29: Where Stars Land on Heart of Asia
- October 29: My Dear Heart (rerun) on Jeepney TV
- October 29: Because This Is My First Life on Kapamilya Channel
- October 30: Knock Out, La Doña and My Fantastic Pag-ibig on GTV
- October 30: Rob the Robot and The Garfield Show on Kapamilya Channel
- October 30: Star Myx on Myx
- October 31: Myx Moods on Myx
- October 31: Encounter (Philippine adaptation) on Sari-Sari Channel
- October 31: American Greed (season 12) on TAP Edge
- November 5: POPinoy All Access and POPinoy PopDates on Colours
- November 5: Playful Kiss on GTV
- November 5: Adarna on Heart of Asia
- November 5: Ikaw Lang ang Iibigin (rerun), Noah and Palibhasa Lalake (rerun) on Jeepney TV
- November 5: On the Spot on Kapamilya Channel
- November 5: Business Above Usual on TeleRadyo
- November 7: POPinoy on Colours
- November 7: Ben X Jim (season 1) on Heart of Asia
- November 9: Chicago Med season 2 on TAP Edge
- November 9: Keeping Up with the Kardashians (season 19) on TAP TV
- November 12: Mac and Chiz on BuKo Channel
- November 12: Legal Wives on GTV and Heart of Asia
- November 12: Huwag Kang Mangamba on Jeepney TV
- November 12: Dolce Amore and Huwag Kang Mangamba on Kapamilya Channel
- November 14: Fighter of Destiny (rerun), Rakshasa Street (rerun) and U-Prince on Heart of Asia
- November 19: Boys Over Flowers and To Have & to Hold (remaining episodes continued via GMA) on Heart of Asia
- November 19: Game Ka Na Ba? (2nd incarnation; season 4) on Jeepney TV
- November 19: Obra Macabra on One Screen
- November 25: Myx Versions on Myx
- November 26: Calla Lily on Jeepney TV
- November 26: Live Up to Your Name on Kapamilya Channel
- November 28: Chinese by Blood, Filipino by Heart (season 1) on CNN Philippines
- November 28: Detective Conan: Episode One and Pokémon the Series: XYZ on GTV
- November 29: Myx Live! on Myx
- December 2: Now Streaming on One Screen
- December 3: Aladdin: You Would've Heard the Name and VIP on Heart of Asia
- December 3: Johnny Test on Jeepney TV
- December 3: POPinoy on One PH
- December 3: Reina de corazones on One Screen
- December 5: Art2art on DZRH TV
- December 5: Pinoy Aklatan: Filipino Stories for Kids (Pinoy A+) on GTV
- December 5: Pinoy Myx and Pop Myx on Myx
- December 6: Riviera (season 2) on TAP Edge
- December 8: Chicago P.D. season 3 on TAP Edge
- December 10: Mr. Merman on GTV
- December 10: Her Private Life on Heart of Asia
- December 10: May Bukas Pa (2009; rerun) and Minsan Lang Kita Iibigin (rerun) on Jeepney TV
- December 10: Krypton on One Screen
- December 12: Melting Me Softly on Kapamilya Channel
- December 13: Chicago Fire season 3 on TAP Edge
- December 17: Hawak Kamay on Jeepney TV
- December 17: María la del Barrio on One Screen
- December 18: Hiwaga ng Kambat on Kapamilya Channel
- December 18: Pet Pals TV (season 1) on Pinoy Xtreme
- December 19: Laugh Laban on Cine Mo!
- December 19: Di Na Muli on Sari-Sari Channel
- December 23: Myx Backtrax on Myx
- December 23: The Sinner (season 1) on TAP Edge
- December 24: Because of You and Secret Love Online on Heart of Asia
- December 24: Jay Leno's Garage (season 1) on TAP Sports
- December 25: Same Age Trainer and Sing Galing: Sing-lebrity Edition (season 1) on Colours
- December 25: Ancient Aliens (season 1) on One Screen
- December 26: Discover Eats, Half Holiday in Italy, Modern Living TV and Stylish Docus on Colours
- December 26: Heirs of the Night on GTV
- December 26: Laugh Laban on Jeepney TV
- December 26: Mellow Myx and Myx Take 5 on Myx
- December 26: Hollywood Cineplex and Regal Originals on One Screen
- December 28: John en Ellen (season 2) on One Screen
- December 29: Lifetime Original Movies on Colours
- December 29: Afterlife on One Screen
- December 30: Fit Me, Idol Lunchbox, Kiddie Cuisine, Life's a Beach, Louie O. Live with Robin Nievera, M Countdown, Mind S-Cool (season 3; rerun), Mom Café, Niña Niño, Sing Galing! (2nd incarnation; season 1) and Workout From Home on Colours
- December 30: Love vs. Stars on One Screen
- December 30: Juander Titser on TeleRadyo
- December 31: 40 is the New 30, Batibot, From Helen's Kitchen, Lunch Out Loud, MomBiz and Movie Mania on Colours
- December 31: Christmas Cartoon Festival Presents on GTV
- December 31: Dading on Heart of Asia
- December 31: A Love So Beautiful on Kapamilya Channel
- December 31: Born Beautiful: The Series, La Patrona, María Mercedes, The Orbiters and The Secret Life of My Secretary (rerun) on One Screen
- December 31: I Plead Guilty and In Love with Ramon on Telenovela Channel

==== Unknown dates ====
- August: #KKO, Ang Inyong Armed Forces, Ang Inyong Kawal, Balik Loob sa Pagbabago, Brakefast, News Express, News in 3, The Tito Potato Show, Up Up Pilipinas and WEmen on tvQ2

==== Unknown ====
- Balitang America and Trending with Kelly on ANC
- G Diaries on TeleRadyo

==== Stopped airing ====
Program	Channel	Last airing	Resumed airing	Reason
24 Oras Weekend	GMA News TV	January 23 (Saturday edition); February 7 (Sunday edition)	March 13 (GTV)	Program on break.
WWE Raw	TAP Sports	February 9	May 12	Temporary suspension of broadcast due to contract renewal negotiations between TAP DMV and WWE.
News.PH (2nd incarnation)	CNN Philippines	February 26	May 10	Program on break.
News.PH (2nd incarnation)	CNN Philippines	August 23	September 6	Temporary suspension of broadcast due to the disinfection of the building where the network is being housed.
I M Ready sa Dobol B (Dobol B TV)	GTV	March 6 (as a TV program)	March 13 (as a segment of Super Balita sa Umaga Saturday Edition)	Fused into a segment of Super Balita sa Umaga Saturday Edition on March 13.
Jackie Chan Adventures	GTV	March 21	October 31	Series break.
Pokémon the Series: Sun and Moon	GTV	March 22	July 4	Series break.
Pokémon the Series: Sun and Moon	GTV	October 10	December 5	Series break.
The Final Word	CNN Philippines	March 31	April 26	Program on break.
Rated Korina	One PH	April 25	June 20	Season break.
Everywhere I Go (ETCerye Rewind; rerun)	ETC	May 18	June 28	Season break.
All-Out Sundays	GTV	May 30	October 16, 2022	Program on break.
Super Kapamilya Blockbusters	Kapamilya Channel	June 12	July 3	Programing block on break.
Simba: The King Lion	GTV	June 13	October 31	Moved to GMA on June 19.
Pokémon the Series: XYZ	GTV	July 2	October 11	Series break.
Endless Love (2010)	Heart of Asia	July 23	August 30	Affected by the channel's programming schedule lineup changes with remaining episodes continued via GMA.
Newsroom Ngayon	CNN Philippines	August 23	September 6	Temporary suspension of broadcast due to the disinfection of the building where the network is being housed.
New Day	CNN Philippines	August 24	September 6	Temporary suspension of broadcast due to the disinfection of the building where the network is being housed.
Sports Desk	CNN Philippines	August 24	September 6	Temporary suspension of broadcast due to the disinfection of the building where the network is being housed.
Piggy Tales: Third Act	GTV	August 29	October 31	Series break.
Kabayan	Kapamilya Channel and TeleRadyo	October 7	November 8	Temporary suspension of broadcast due to the host's running for candidacy of a government position in the 2022 elections, which later withdrawn and took on leave of absence.

==== Cancelled ====
- January 8: Chika, Besh! on Colours (reason: Program failed to renew its contract resulting to the cancellation.)
- April 14: Chinatown News TV (CNTV) on ANC (reason: ABS-CBN and Horizon of the Sun Communications, Inc. received numerous backlash and heavily criticism, as well as negative reactions from its public viewers and netizens amid the disputed foreign territorial and relationship ties between the Philippines and China resulting to their partnership's termination.)

=== Video streaming services ===
- January 9: Pearl Next Door on YouTube (The IdeaFirst Company)
- January 16: La Vida Lena (pilot series) and The House Arrest of Us on iWantTFC
- January 16: The House Arrest of Us on KTX
- January 24: Hoy, Love You! on iWantTFC
- February 3: Horrorscope on iWantTFC
- February 13: Unloving U on iWantTFC
- February 27: Barangay 143 (season 2) on POPTV
- March 12: Section St. Valentine: The Disappearance of Divine on WeTV iflix
- April 9: Ben X Jim (season 2) on Upstream PH
- June 26: Click, Like, Share (season 1) on iWantTFC and KTX
- July 30: He's Into Her (season 1) on iWantTFC
- August 8: Coke Studio: Itodo Mo, Beat Mo on YouTube (Coke Studio Philippines)
- August 18: My Sunset Girl on iWantTFC
- August 28: GVBOYS: Pangmalakasang Good Vibes on YouTube (Puregold Channel)
- September 20: Love Beneath the Stars on iWantTFC
- September 24: Click, Like, Share (season 2) on iWantTFC
- October 3: On the Job on HBO Go
- October 22: Pasabuy on WeTV iflix
- October 16: Hoy, Love You Two on iWantTFC
- December 12: The Gaming House on iWantTFC
- December 18: Hero City Kids Force on iWantTFC
- December 31: Still on Viu

== Networks ==
The following are a list of free-to-air and cable channels or networks launches and closures in 2021.

=== Launches ===
Date	Station	Type	Channel	Source
January 4	Paramount Network (branded from Paramount Channel)	Cable and satellite	Cignal Channel 52 (Nationwide)	
February 12	tvQ2	Cable and satellite	Cignal Channel 107 (Nationwide)	
February 22	GTV (2nd incarnation)	Broadcasting channel	Channel 27 (analog feed) / Channel 15 (digital feed); Cignal Channel 11 (Nationwide); G Sat Channel 6 (Nationwide); GMA Affordabox Channel 2 (Metro Manila); SatLite Channel 11 (Nationwide); Sky Cable Channel 24 (Metro Manila) / Channel 12 (Provincial); Destiny Cable Channel 24 (Metro Manila); Cablelink Channel 13 (Metro Manila)	
April 5	I Heart Movies	Free-to-air	DTT Channel 7.05; GMA Affordabox Channel 5 (Metro Manila); Cignal TV Channel 46 (now moved to Channel 47 Nationwide since September 1, 2026)	
April 5	WakuWaku Japan	Cable and satellite	Cignal Channel 172 (Nationwide)	
April 28	Newsline Philippines	Broadcasting service	Various channel listings	
May 15	Ryan and Friends	Cable and satellite	Air Cable Channel 2 (Provincial)	
June 20	Loveworld Asia	Cable and satellite	Sky Cable Channel 207 (HD) (Metro Manila)	
July 1	Music Quest	Cable and satellite	G Sat Channel 45 (Nationwide)	
July 28	Pocket Watch	Internet Protocol television	Vision Channel 8 (Metro Manila)	
July 28	Quanzhou TV	Internet Protocol television	Vision Channel 115 (Metro Manila)	
July 28	Star Channel 1	Internet Protocol television	Vision Channel 126 (Metro Manila)	
July 28	USA Today News	Internet Protocol television	Vision Channel 10 (Metro Manila)	
July 28	USA Today Sports	Internet Protocol television	Vision Channel 9 (Metro Manila)	
August 2	BuKo Channel	Cable and satellite	Cignal Channel 2 (Nationwide); SatLite Channel 2 (Nationwide)	
September 8	UAAP Varsity Channel	Cable and satellite	Cignal Channel 263 (HD) (Nationwide); SatLite Channel 55 (SD) (Nationwide)	
September 11	DreamWorks Channel Philippines	Cable and satellite	Cignal Channel 79 (SD) (Nationwide); Sky Cable Channel 47 (SD) (Metro Manila) / Channel 101 (SD) (Provincial)^{1}	
September 13	DepEd-NCR Prime	Broadcasting channel	Channel 21 (digital feed); Sky Cable Channel 4 (Metro Manila)^{2}	
September 30	Moonbug Kids	Cable and satellite	Cignal Channel 78 (Nationwide)	
October 1	B4U Movies	Cable and satellite	Planet Cable Channel X (Provincial)	
October 1	Chillayo	Cable and satellite	Cablelink Channel 314 (HD) (Metro Manila)	
October 1	Cinemachi Action	Cable and satellite	Cablelink Channel 302 (HD) (Metro Manila)	
October 1	Cinemachi Docu	Cable and satellite	Cablelink Channel 61 (Metro Manila)	
October 1	Cinemachi Family	Cable and satellite	Cablelink Channel 48 (Metro Manila)	
October 1	Cinemachi Xtra	Cable and satellite	Cablelink Channel 47 (SD) / Channel 300 (HD) (Metro Manila)	
October 1	DD Sports	Cable and satellite	Royal Cable Channel 103 (Laguna)	
October 1	EM TV	Cable and satellite	Planet Cable Channel X (Provincial)	
October 1	Homey's	Cable and satellite	Cablelink Channel 33 (Metro Manila)	
October 1	Hoora TV	Cable and satellite	Planet Cable Channel X (Provincial)	
October 1	Lolly Kids	Cable and satellite	Cablelink Channel 204 (Metro Manila)	
October 1	MyZen TV	Cable and satellite	G Sat Channel 66 (Nationwide)	
October 1	Planet Fun	Cable and satellite	Cignal TV Channel 71 (Nationwide); Cablelink Channel 213 (Metro Manila)	
October 1	Premier Sports	Cable and satellite	Cignal Channel 272 (HD) (Nationwide); G Sat Channel 30 (Nationwide)^{3} Sky Cable Channel 140 (SD) / Channel 176 (HD) (Metro Manila) & Channel 307 (SD) / Channel 761 (HD) (Provincial)^{4}	
October 1	Reuters Live	Cable and satellite	Cignal TV Channel 32 (Nationwide); Planet Cable Channel X (Provincial)	
October 1	Sportyfy	Cable and satellite	Cablelink Channel 54 (SD) / Channel 354 (HD) (Metro Manila)	
October 1	Stingray CMusic	Cable and satellite	Cignal TV Channel 33 (Nationwide); Royal Cable Channel 901 (Laguna)	
October 1	TAP Action Flix	Cable and satellite	Cignal Channel 216 (HD) (Nationwide); SatLite Channel 74 (Nationwide); Sky Cable Channel 78 (SD) / Channel 177 (HD) (Metro Manila) & Channel 407 (SD) / Channel 715 (HD) (Provincial)^{4}	
October 1	TAP Movies	Cable and satellite	Cignal Channel 50 (SD) / Channel 215 (HD) (Nationwide); SatLite Channel 75 (Nationwide); Sky Cable Channel 55 (SD) / Channel 170 (HD) (Metro Manila) & Channel 406 (SD) / Channel 714 (HD) (Provincial)^{4}	
October 1	Travelxp	Cable and satellite	Cablelink Channel 351 (HD) (Metro Manila)	
October 1	The Word Network	Cable and satellite	Planet Cable Channel X (Provincial)	
October 1	Wow!	Cable and satellite	Cablelink Channel 56 (SD) / Channel 353 (HD) (Metro Manila)	
October 18	SPOTV	Cable and satellite	Sky Cable Channel 31 (SD) / Channel 253 (HD) (Metro Manila) & Channel 304 (SD) / Channel 758 (HD) (Provincial)	
October 18	SPOTV2	Cable and satellite	Sky Cable Channel 32 (SD) / Channel 254 (HD) (Metro Manila) & Channel 305 (SD) / Channel 759 (HD) (Provincial)	
November 1	Dubai Sports	Cable and satellite	Parasat Cable TV Channel 99 (Cagayan de Oro)	
November 1	Highland TV	Regional	DTT Channel 44.02 (Baguio); Cignal TV Channel 113 (Nationwide)	
November 1	Sansha TV	Cable and satellite	Parasat Cable TV Channel 116 (Cagayan de Oro)	
November 1	Veritas TeleRadyo	Cable and satellite	Sky Cable Channel 211 (Metro Manila); Cignal TV Channel 189 (Nationwide)	

=== Rebranded ===
The following is a list of television stations or cable channels that have made or will make noteworthy network rebrands in 2021.

Date	Rebranded from	Rebranded to	Type	Channel	Source
February 1	Paramount Channel (branded as Paramount Network)	Paramount Network (official branding)	Cable and satellite	Cignal Channel 52 (Nationwide); G Sat Channel 78 (Nationwide)^{5}	
February 22	GMA News TV	GTV (2nd incarnation)	Broadcasting network	Channel 27 (analog feed) / Channel 15 (digital feed); Cignal Channel 11 (Nationwide); G Sat Channel 6 (Nationwide); GMA Affordabox Channel 2 (Metro Manila); SatLite Channel 11 (Nationwide); Sky Cable Channel 24 (Metro Manila) / Channel 12 (Provincial); Destiny Cable Channel 24 (Metro Manila); Cablelink Channel 13 (Metro Manila); Converge Vision Channel 11 (Metro Manila)	
May 3	One Media Network	Golden Nation Network	Broadcasting channel	Selected terrestrial stations G Sat Channel 1 (Nationwide)	
June	Community TV3	PEP TV	Cable and satellite	Air Cable Channel 3 (SD) / Channel 209 (HD) (Pampanga)	
July 1	DZRH News Television (remained as official name)	DZRH TV (stylized as on-air branding)	Broadcasting channel	Selected terrestrial stations (via TV Natin); Cignal Channel 18 (Nationwide); G Sat Channel 39 (Nationwide); SatLite Channel 140 (Nationwide); Sky Cable Channel 129 (Metro Manila); Cablelink Channel 3 (Metro Manila); Converge Vision Channel 14 (Metro Manila)	
August 1	Viva TV (2nd incarnation)	Viva Cinema (3rd incarnation)	Broadcasting channel	Cignal Channel 42 (Nationwide); SatLite Channel 32 (Nationwide); Cablelink Channel 51 (Metro Manila); Converge Vision Channel 43 (Metro Manila)	
September 1	Blue Ant Entertainment	Rock Entertainment	Cable and satellite	Cignal Channel 120 (Nationwide); G Sat Channel 19 (Nationwide); Sky Cable Channel 53 (SD) / Channel 196 (HD) (Metro Manila) & Channel 616 (SD) / Channel 739 (HD) (Provincial); Cablelink Channel 37 (Metro Manila)	
September 1	Blue Ant Extreme	Rock Extreme	Cable and satellite	Cignal Channel 122 (Nationwide); G Sat Channel 31 (Nationwide); Sky Cable Channel 104 (SD) / Channel 209 (HD) (Metro Manila) & Channel 223 (SD) / Channel 768 (HD) (Provincial); Cablelink Channel 36 (Metro Manila)^{6}	
September 1	Travel Channel (remained as official name)	Trvl Channel (stylized as on-air branding)	Cable and satellite	Cignal Channel 64 (Nationwide); G Sat Channel 67 (Nationwide); Sky Cable Channel 82 (SD) / Channel 201 (HD) (Metro Manila) & Channel 611 (SD) / Channel 727 (HD) (Provincial)	

=== Closures ===
Date	Station	Type	Channel	Sign-on debut	Source
January 1	Disney XD Southeast Asia	Cable and satellite	Cignal Channel 69 (Nationwide)	May 31, 2014	
February 1	Comedy Central Asia	Cable and satellite	Cignal Channel 125 (Nationwide); Sky Cable Channel 73 (SD) / Channel 189 (HD) (Metro Manila) & Channel 621 (SD) / Channel 748 (HD) (Provincial); Cablelink Channel 311 (HD) (Metro Manila)	May 2013	
February 21	GMA News TV	Broadcasting channel	Channel 27 (analog feed) / Channel 15 (digital feed); Cignal Channel 11 (Nationwide); G Sat Channel 6 (Nationwide); GMA Affordabox Channel 2 (Metro Manila); SatLite Channel 11 (Nationwide); Sky Cable Channel 24 (Metro Manila) / Channel 12 (Provincial); Destiny Cable Channel 24 (Metro Manila); Cablelink Channel 13 (Metro Manila)	February 28, 2011	
February 10	Amazing Discoveries TV	Cable and satellite	G Sat Channel 35 (Nationwide)	October 8, 2020	
February 11	Fight COVID-19 (information channel)	Cable and satellite	G Sat Channel 51 (Nationwide)	July 15, 2020	
February 11	GINX Esports TV	Cable and satellite	G Sat Channel 23 (Nationwide); Sky Cable Channel 213 (Metro Manila)^{7}	June 16, 2019	
February 11	Sonlife Broadcasting Network	Cable and satellite	G Sat Channel 38 (Nationwide)	August 10, 2019	
February 11	Stingray Classica	Cable and satellite	Various channel listings G Sat Channel 92 (HD) (Nationwide); Sky Cable Channel 192 (HD) (Metro Manila)^{7}	May 17, 2012	
May 1	K Movies Pinoy	Cable and satellite	Sky Cable Channel 79 (Metro Manila); Cablelink Channel 44 (Metro Manila)^{8}	August 1, 2019	
June 1	Miao Mi	Cable and satellite	Sky Cable Channel 118 (Metro Manila)	June 1, 2018	
July 1	Red by HBO	Cable and satellite	Cignal Channel 50 (Nationwide); SatLite Channel 70 (Nationwide); Sky Cable Channel 74 (Metro Manila); Cablelink Channel 50 (Metro Manila)	February 15, 2012	
August	tvQ2	Cable and satellite	Cignal Channel 107 (Nationwide)	February 12, 2021	
October 1	Channel V	Cable and satellite	Cignal Channel 150 (Nationwide)^{9} G Sat Channel 71 (Nationwide); Sky Cable Channel 69 (Metro Manila) / Channel 631 (Provincial)	1995	
October 1	Disney Channel Philippines	Cable and satellite	Cignal Channel 71 (SD) (Nationwide); Sky Cable Channel 47 (SD) / Channel 250 (HD) (Metro Manila) & Channel 101 (SD) / Channel 732 (HD) (Provincial); Cablelink Channel 25 (Metro Manila)	January 15, 2000	
October 1	Disney Junior Asia	Cable and satellite	Cignal Channel 70 (SD) (Nationwide); Sky Cable Channel 38 (Metro Manila) / Channel 102 (Provincial); Cablelink Channel 27 (Metro Manila)^{8}	July 11, 2011	
October 1	Fox Philippines	Cable and satellite	Cignal Channel 233 (HD) (Nationwide); G Sat Channel 56 (Nationwide); Sky Cable Channel 50 (SD) / Channel 173 (HD) (Metro Manila) & Channel 609 (SD) / Channel 742 (HD) (Provincial); Cablelink Channel 29 (Metro Manila)	January 4, 2010	
October 1	Fox Action Movies	Cable and satellite	Cignal Channel 212 (HD) (Nationwide); G Sat Channel 82 (Nationwide); Sky Cable Channel 78 (SD) / Channel 177 (HD) (Metro Manila) & Channel 410 (SD) / Channel 718 (HD) (Provincial); Cablelink Channel 36 (SD) / Channel 302 (HD) (Metro Manila)	October 1, 2012	
October 1	Fox Crime Asia	Cable and satellite	Cignal Channel 128 (SD) (Nationwide)^{9} Sky Cable Channel 64 (SD) / Channel 251 (HD) (Metro Manila) & Channel 618 (SD) / Channel 742 (HD) (Provincial); Cablelink Channel 221 (HD) (Metro Manila)	January 1, 2008	
October 1	Fox Family Movies	Cable and satellite	Cignal Channel 52 (SD) (Nationwide)^{9} G Sat Channel 79 (Nationwide); Sky Cable Channel 61 (SD) / Channel 171 (HD) (Metro Manila) & Channel 407 (SD) / Channel 715 (HD) (Provincial); Cablelink Channel 48 (Metro Manila)^{8}	September 16, 2010	
October 1	Fox Life Philippines	Cable and satellite	Cignal Channel 124 (SD) / Channel 232 (HD) (Nationwide); G Sat Channel 66 (Nationwide); Sky Cable Channel 48 (SD) / Channel 172 (HD) (Metro Manila) & Channel 606 (SD) / Channel 741 (HD) (Provincial); Cablelink Channel 28 (Metro Manila)	October 1, 2017	
October 1	Fox Movies Philippines	Cable and satellite	Cignal Channel 55 (SD) / Channel 211 (HD) (Nationwide); G Sat Channel 59 (Nationwide); Sky Cable Channel 55 (SD) / Channel 170 (HD) (Metro Manila) & Channel 406 (SD) / Channel 714 (HD) (Provincial); Cablelink Channel 47 (SD) / Channel 300 (HD) (Metro Manila)	June 10, 2017	
October 1	Fox Sports Philippines	Cable and satellite	Cignal Channel 264 (HD) (Nationwide); G Sat Channel 89 (Nationwide); Sky Cable Channel 31 (SD) / Channel 253 (HD) (Metro Manila) & Channel 304 (SD) / Channel 758 (HD) (Provincial); Cablelink Channel 55 (Metro Manila)	January 28, 2013	
October 1	Fox Sports 2	Cable and satellite	Cignal Channel 265 (HD) (Nationwide); G Sat Channel 74 (Nationwide); Sky Cable Channel 32 (SD) / Channel 254 (HD) (Metro Manila) & Channel 305 (SD) / Channel 759 (HD) (Provincial); Cablelink Channel 56 (Metro Manila)	August 15, 2014	
October 1	Fox Sports 3	Cable and satellite	Cignal Channel 92 (Nationwide)^{9} G Sat Channel 90 (Nationwide); Sky Cable Channel 140 (SD) / Channel 176 (HD) (Metro Manila) & Channel 307 (SD) / Channel 761 (HD) (Provincial); Cablelink Channel 57 (Metro Manila)	August 15, 2014	
October 1	FX Philippines	Cable and satellite	Various channel listings Cignal Channel 237 (HD) (Nationwide)^{9} Cablelink Channel 240 (HD) (Metro Manila)	2004	
October 1	Global Pinoy Cinema	Cable and satellite	G Sat Channel 11 (Nationwide); Destiny Cable Channel 79 (analog) / Channel 212 (digital) (Metro Manila)	2009	
October 1	Nat Geo People Asia	Cable and satellite	Cignal Channel 241 (HD) (Nationwide)^{9} Sky Cable Channel 117 (SD) / Channel 262 (HD) (Metro Manila) & Channel 220 (SD) / Channel 726 (HD) (Provincial); Cablelink Channel 330 (HD) (Metro Manila)	March 1, 2014	

=== Stopped broadcasting ===
The following is a list of stations and channels or networks that have stopped broadcasting or (temporarily) off the air in 2021.

Station	Type	Channel	Last broadcasting	Resumed broadcasting	Reason	Source
Health & Wellness	Cable and satellite	G Sat Channel 34 (Nationwide); Cablelink Channel 60 (Metro Manila)	February 10 (through G Sat)	October 1 (through Cablelink)	Broadcast termination due to the provider's revamped channel space assignments.	
Luxe & Life	Cable and satellite	G Sat Channel 33 (Nationwide); Cablelink Channel 330 (HD) (Metro Manila)	February 10 (through G Sat)	October 1 (through Cablelink)	Broadcast termination due to the provider's revamped channel space assignments.	
Pet & Pal	Cable and satellite	G Sat Channel 32 (Nationwide); Cablelink Channel 331 (HD) (Metro Manila)	February 10 (through G Sat)	October 1 (through Cablelink)	Broadcast termination due to the provider's revamped channel space assignments.	
PTV	Broadcasting network	Channel 4 (analog feed) / Channel 42 (digital feed); Cignal Channel 4 (Nationwide); G Sat Channel 4 (Nationwide); SatLite Channel 4 (Nationwide); Sky Cable / Destiny Cable Channel 6 (Metro Manila); Cablelink Channel 9 (Metro Manila)	March 17	March 18 (non-station produced programs); March 22 (station-produced programs)	Temporary suspension of broadcasting due to the disinfection of the building where the network is being housed as a precaution against COVID-19, but the operations continue through online.	

=== Cancelled ===
The following is a list of television stations or cable channels that have the network cancellation in 2021.

Original date	Station	Type	Channel	Reason	Source
Unknown	One Life	—N/a	—N/a	Intended to be another MediaQuest channel launched under the "One" branding (presently known as the "One Network Media Group"). In November 2021, a lifestyle portal of the same name was terminated due to changes in business direction, resulting to the channel's planned launching cancellation.	

- Notes
1. ^1: via Sky Cable since November 15
2. ^2: via Sky Cable since November 27
3. ^3: via G Sat since December 6
4. ^4: via Sky Cable since October 18
5. ^5: via G Sat since February 10
6. ^6: via Cablelink since October 1
7. ^7: On January 1, Sky Cable terminated the network due to the expiration of its contract
8. ^8: On January 4, Cablelink terminated the network due to the expiration of its contract and unpaid carriage fee
9. ^9: On January 2, Cignal terminated the network due to the expiration of its contract

== Services ==
The following are a list of television operators or providers and streaming media platforms or services launches and closures in 2021.

=== Launches ===
Date	Provider	Type	Stream	Source
February 7	GMA Now	DTT USB OTG mobile dongle stick	N/A	
February 12	tvQ2	Multicasting	Facebook (tvQ2Official); YouTube (tvQ2)	
February 14	MOR Entertainment	Multicasting	Facebook (Various) iWantTFC (MOR Live); Kumu (MOR TV); Spotify (MOR Entertainment); YouTube (MOREntertainment)	
February 16	SKY Evo	Digital media player	N/A	
February	RAD	VOD OTT streaming media platform	N/A	
March 31	TBA Play	VOD OTT streaming media platform	N/A	
July 28	Converge Vision	IPTV service	N/A	
July	Puso Pilipinas	Multicasting	Facebook (PusoPilipinas); YouTube (Puso Pilipinas)	
September 10	Sulit TV	DTT set-top device box	N/A	
October 13	Discovery+	VOD OTT streaming media platform	N/A	

=== Rebranded ===
The following is a list of streaming providers that have made or will make noteworthy service rebrands in 2021.

Date	Rebranded from	Rebranded to	Type	Stream	Source
June	Myx Philippines	Myx Global	Multicasting	Facebook (MYX Global); YouTube (MYX Global)	
September 10	Smart GigaFest	Smart GigaPlay	VOD OTT streaming media platform	Website (Smart Communications)	

=== Closures ===
Date	Provider	Type	Stream	Sign-on debut	Source
August	tvQ2	Multicasting	Facebook (tvQ2Official); YouTube (tvQ2)	February 12, 2021	

== Deaths ==
February

- February 11 – Eli Soriano, (b. 1947), televangelist and host of Ang Dating Daan.
- February 19 – Vincent Arboleda, (b. 1987), UNTV News reporter.

April

- April 9 – Totoy Talastas, (b. 1928), radio and television broadcaster.
- April 22 – Edwin Sevidal, (b. 1971), DZMM field reporter.
- April 23 – Victor Wood, (b. 1946), singer and host of Beautiful Sunday.

May

- May 1 – Le Chazz, (b. 1977), comedian and TV host.
- May 4 – Ricky Lo, (b. 1946), veteran entertainment columnist and TV host.
- May 23 – Ely Aligora, (b. 1949), former radio announcer, newscaster, reporter and TV Host of ABS-CBN and DZMM Radyo Patrol 630, former station manager of DWIZ 882 Manila and Executive Vice President of Aliw Broadcasting Corporation.

June

- June 23 – Shalala, (b. 1960), comedian, radio and television personality.
- June 26 – Ken Bornilla (b. 1997), news reporter.

July

- July 14 – Hans Mortel, (b. 1972), comedian and TV host.
- July 26 – Ate Shawie, (b. 1976), impersonator, comedian and television personality.
- July 30 – Manuel Morato, (b. 1933), former MTRCB chairman, PCSO board of director and host of Dial-M.
- July 31 – Arlene de Castro, (b. 1955), former vice president for current affairs of ABS-CBN News and CEO of Bayan Productions.

August

- August 4 – Kitchie Benedicto, (b. 1947), veteran producer and director.
- August 17 – Jun del Rosario, (b. 1959), veteran journalist.
- August 31 – Mahal, (b. 1974), comedienne.

October

- October 2 – Leo Obligar, (b. 1938), radio and television personality.

November

- November 21 – Bert de Leon, (b. 1947), television director.

December

- December 20 – Arlyn dela Cruz, (b. 1970), broadcast journalist and filmmaker.

== See also ==
- 2021 in television
