= On Record (TV program) =

Philippine television infotainment docu-magazine show

- Genre: Infotainment; Docu-magazine
- Country of origin: Philippines
- Original language: Tagalog

Production
- Camera setup: Multiple-camera setup
- Running time: 30 minutes
- Production company: GMA Public Affairs

Original release
- Network: GMA Network
- Release: February 16, 2021 – October 19, 2024
- Network: GTV
- Release: October 26, 2021 – January 11, 2022

On Record is a Philippine television infotainment docu-magazine show broadcast by GMA Network and GTV. Hosted by Mav Gonzales and Oscar Oida, it premiered on February 16, 2021 on the network's Power Block. The show concluded on January 11, 2022 after it was transferred to GTV on October 26, 2021.

The show is streaming online on YouTube.

== Premise ==
The program uncovers inspiring stories, background contexts, and good vibes moments behind viral videos and special clips caught on camera.

== Hosts ==
- Mav Gonzales
- Oscar Oida
