= Knowledge Channel =

Educational TV channel in the Philippines

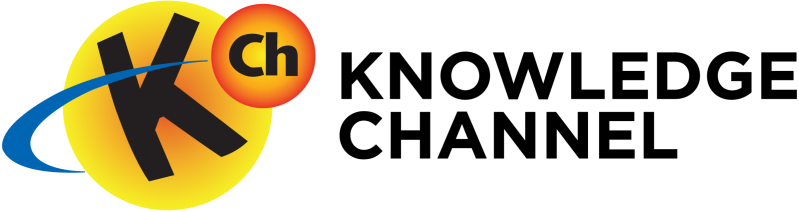
- Your School Anywhere; Masayang Matuto ng Bago!
- Country: Philippines
- Broadcast area: Nationwide
- Network: ABS-CBN
- Headquarters: Quezon City, Metro Manila, Philippines

Programming
- Languages: Tagalog (main); English (secondary)
- Picture format: 1080i (HDTV) (downscaled to 16:9 480i for the SDTV feed)

Ownership
- Owner: ABS-CBN Corporation
- Key people: Federico R. Lopez (Chairman) Francis Giles B. Puno (Vice Chairman) Rina Lopez (President and Executive Director)
- Sister channels: Under ABS-CBN; A2Z (via ZOE TV); All TV (via AMBS); ANC; Cinema One; Cine Mo! Jeepney TV; Kapamilya Channel; Metro Channel; Myx; Myx TV (America); DZMM Radyo Patrol 630; DZMM TeleRadyo; TFC; Favorite Music Radio

History
- Launched: November 6, 1999; 26 years ago
- Replaced: Inquirer 990 Television (BEAM TV channel space); UFC TV (BEAM TV's xx.02 digital channel space)
- Replaced by: All TV (UHF 16 Manila channel space)

Links
- Website: www.knowledgechannel.org

Availability

Terrestrial
- BEAM TV (Nationwide): Channel x.2 (DTT)
- Southern Broadcasting Network Metro Manila: Channel 21.4
- SkyTV Metro Manila: Channel 32
- Sky Direct Nationwide: Channel 28
- Cignal TV Nationwide: Channel 146
- SatLite Nationwide: Channel 182
- G Sat Nationwide: Channel 41

Streaming media
- iWant: Watch live
- BEAM TV: BEAM TV
- Cignal Play: Watch Live (Philippines Only)

Knowledge Channel (KCh), is a Philippine free-to-air television channel owned by ABS-CBN Corporation that consists of educational and informative programs. The channel is available on digital TV via BEAM TV, SBN, Sky Cable, Sky Direct, Converge Vision, Cignal, Parasat Cable TV, Cablelink, Planet Cable and other cable providers. It also livestreams online via iWant while a video on demand service is available on YouTube.

Corporately, it is known as Knowledge Channel Foundation, Inc. (KCFI), a non-stock, non-profit organization in the Philippines that develops, acquires, and distributes multimedia educational resources aligned with the K-12 curriculum of the Department of Education (DepEd).

Since September 11, 2025, the channel began broadcasting in the anamorphic 16:9 aspect ratio. The change allowed for a widescreen presentation, optimizing the viewing experience for viewers with compatible widescreen televisions.

Since January 2, 2026, several Knowledge Channel programs are also simulcasted on AMBS' All TV, marking its partial return to digital channel 16 in Mega Manila and regional channels previously held by ABS-CBN until 2020.

== History ==
Knowledge Channel Foundation, Inc. (KCFI) was founded in June 1999 by Rina Lopez and Carlo Katigbak to democratize access to quality education through television. The foundation launched the Knowledge Channel (KCh) to broadcast curriculum-based video lessons to public schools across the archipelago.

=== 1999 ===
Founded on June 14, 1999, KCFI was initially established under the name Sky Foundation Inc. The organization introduced the Knowledge Channel TV program for cablecasting in the National Capital Region (NCR) through Sky Cable, while also distributing U-Matic tapes to Sky Cable headends nationwide to expand access to educational content. On July 14, 1999, KCFI hosted its first Principal Orientation with Department of Education (DepEd) NCR at the Meralco Theater, where it introduced its mission of creating transformative learning experiences through educational television.

Following the orientation, KCFI conducted its inaugural teacher training on September 9–10, 1999, demonstrating how teachers could integrate educational television resources into classroom instruction through Sky Cable broadcasts. On November 6, 1999, KCh aired its first broadcast on Sky Cable and was subsequently installed in 300 public schools within NCR. During the same year, the foundation also entered a one-year partnership with DepEd through then Education Secretary Florencio Abad to support the integration of educational television in public schools.

=== 2000 ===
On March 9, 2000, KCFI signed a memorandum of agreement with DepEd for a 10-year partnership, following an initial one-year agreement signed on June 28, 1999. The partnership was formalized under Education Secretary Andrew Gonzalez, who in 2000 proclaimed KCh as required viewing for public schools to support classroom learning through educational television. On August 15, 2000, KCFI also hosted its inaugural Cable Installation Rites at Rizal High School under the tagline “Bringing the Classroom Into the 21st Century: Knowledge Channel,” marking the installation of cable access in schools for KCh programming.

=== 2001 ===
In 2001, KCFI launched its first original series, Kasaysayan TV and Pamana. During the same period, KCh uplinked to Intelsat 8 using transponder space provided by ABS-CBN, allowing its educational programming to be distributed across the Asia–Pacific region. On March 29, 2001, KCFI partnered with the Philippine Cable Television Association, Inc. (PCTA) to expand access to the channel in the provinces, with Rina Lopez presenting the initiative during an orientation seminar for new governors. Through partnerships and resource turnover programs with institutions such as Citibank, KCh programming became accessible in over 1,000 public schools nationwide, reaching around two million students.

=== 2002 ===
In 2002, KCFI renewed its partnership with PCTA to expand cable broadcast access to additional provincial areas, accompanied by orientation sessions for school principals in newly connected regions. Province-wide orientations were conducted in Misamis Oriental on February 6, 2002, in Bulacan on March 25, 2002, and in Nueva Ecija from May 6–10, 2002. During the same period, Buhisan Elementary School received the first KCh satellite dish connection outside NCR. From 1999 to 2002, KCh installations through Sky Cable reached about 1,200 public schools nationwide.

=== 2003 ===
By 2003, KCh had partnered with about 100 cable television operators nationwide—from Itbayat to Bongao—expanding the reach of its educational programming. More than 1,200 public schools, serving around 2.2 million students across the country, were able to access the channel, with approximately 70% of viewers from elementary public schools and 30% from secondary public schools.

=== 2004 ===
In 2004, KCFI hosted a week-long Learning Journey from February 24 to March 3 for the Global Philanthropist Circle, which included visits to KCFI partner schools in the Philippines. On March 31, KCFI launched “Text Mo, Pangarap Ko,” an SMS-based fundraising campaign supporting the Cable-A-School program that raised ₱2.5 million, enabling the connection of five schools and benefiting 6,006 students. Later that year, on October 10, the foundation organized “Lakad Mo, Pangarap Ko,” a walk-for-a-cause event in Manila with participation from employees and families of the Lopez Group of Companies. The event gathered support from 38 companies and about 8,000 participants, raising ₱5.845 million for KCFI initiatives; the campaign was later recognized at the Gold Quill Awards in 2005.

=== 2005 ===
In 2005, KCFI launched the Television Education for the Advancement of Muslim Mindanao (TEAM–Mindanao) project in Datu Paglas, a peace education initiative in the Autonomous Region in Muslim Mindanao (ARMM) funded by the United States Agency for International Development (USAID). The project enabled the installation of KCh in 153 public schools across ARMM and Regions 9 and 12. During the same year, KCFI introduced its long-running news bulletin Knowledge Now (K-Now), relaunched the “Be A Model School Award” as the “Knowledge Channel Outstanding Stakeholders Award,” and held Lakad Mo, Pangarap Ko 2: Nationwide Na ‘To! with more than 8,000 participants in Manila, Cebu, and Davao City.

KCFI also expanded its educational initiatives through the start of production for Salam and Negosyo Ko, Asenso Ko, while continuing nationwide school support activities, including training 1,937 teachers, orienting 277 principals, and providing 201 additional schools with KCh access through cable or satellite.

=== 2006 ===
In 2006, KCFI expanded its educational reach to approximately 1,600 schools nationwide, from Itbayat to Sitangkai, continuing the second year of the TEAM–Mindanao project with USAID and launching the STEPS Project in partnership with the British Embassy in Manila, providing resources to 10 public schools in Rizal Province. This year, KCFI President Rina Lopez also represented KCFI at the United Nations’ 59th Annual Department of Public Information NGO Conference in New York, sharing the foundation's experience in leveraging technology for education.

=== 2007 ===
In 2007, KCFI launched Salam, a mini-series on peace education developed in response to Executive Order No. 570, aimed at helping students develop skills and attitudes conducive to harmony and conflict resolution. That year, KCFI also launched Negosyo Ko, Asenso Ko, a program for out-of-school youths that teaches business and production skills, and aired Kumikitang Kabuhayan, a series from the ABS-CBN Foundation responding to the increasing followers who are seeking of ways to augment their levels of income as purchasing power weakens as brought by inflation and rising oil prices.

=== 2008 ===
In 2008, KCFI launched its first major channel imaging campaign with the tagline BE THE BEST YOU, Kayang-kaya mo!, while concluding the three-year TEAM–Mindanao project, which provided cable and satellite installations, solar power systems, and 167 TV sets to 153 public schools, benefiting nearly 79,500 students and training over 1,100 teachers and 229 school officials. Partnering with parents, teachers, and community associations (PTCAs) added 87 more TV sets, and the foundation produced ten livelihood and business courses as well as ten peace education modules, extending viewership to over 2.9 million students nationwide. Additional initiatives included new Salam episodes with the UN’s ACT for Peace Programme, the financial literacy series Estudyantipid in partnership with Citigroup Foundation, and the transition of video content from analog formats to digital and multimedia platforms, reaching more than 1,850 public schools and nearly three million students. Former U.S. President Bill Clinton cited KCFI as a pioneering distance learning program during the first and only Clinton Global Initiative meeting in Asia.

=== 2009 ===
In 2009, KCFI expanded its use of transmedia through the Transmedia Group, inspired by the pilot production K-High, integrating live actors, animation, online games, and website and YouTube content to enhance learning and Filipino values alongside the DepEd curriculum. Quiz interstitials were added to each program to reinforce lessons, and KCh highlighted academic programs to support student preparation for the National Achievement Test, with research showing a 2–3% improvement in scores for connected schools.

On November 7, KCFI renewed its 10-year partnership with DepEd, signed by Education Secretary Jesli Lapus and KCFI chairman Oscar M. Lopez, during the first Knowledge Channel Outstanding Stakeholders Awards (KOSA), which recognized schools and partners demonstrating outstanding use of educational television. The foundation also launched its “Take a Step” campaign for its 10th anniversary, engaging employees in initiatives such as Teacher-for-a-Day to teach climate change, and by this milestone, KCFI had reached 1,990 public schools and over three million students across 56 provinces.

=== 2010 ===
In 2010, KCFI launched several initiatives to support alternative learning and broaden educational access. The foundation introduced the Out-of-School and Mature Learners Alternative Learning Institute (OMLALI) program to supplement DepEd's ALS, supporting mobile teachers and the K-LITE package, which included netbooks preloaded with 300 educational shows and portable speakers for ALS supervisors and mobile teachers. New productions under OMLALI included Ibang Klase and Kada Tropa, in partnership with Lopez Holdings Corporation, First Philippine Holdings Corporation, Bayan Academy for Social Entrepreneurship and Human Resource Development, and DepEd.

KCh also launched its theme song and music video May K Ako, the RLB Hour lifestyle show hosted by Rina Lopez, and piloted transmedia content including K-High, Faculty Room, MasterMinds, Agham Aralin, Gab to Go, Travel Pinoy, and Building Bridges Leadership Journey. KCFI engaged in advocacy and public outreach through KOSA 2, recognizing schools, communities, and parents for exemplary utilization of educational television. The foundation also hosted Lead the Change: An Evening of Discussion for Action in Manila and facilitated meetings between President Benigno Aquino III, international civil society leaders, and KCFI chairman Oscar M. Lopez. In sports-based advocacy, KCFI organized the KaRUNungan 2010: Run for Knowledge campaign, where about 2,000 runners, including 31 participants in the ING New York City Marathon, supported Philippine education. Additionally, KCh was featured in the “Teaching” segment of DZMM's Teaching, Learning, Caring (TLC) program.

=== 2011 ===
In 2011, KCFI expanded its educational offerings with KCh On-Demand for ALS, broadcasting new episodes of K-High, Ibang Klase, K Hub, and additional series including Estudyantipid 3, Salam, and Puno ng Buhay. The foundation partnered with Tintin Bersola-Babao to launch ParenTIN.tv, providing a learning platform for parents, grandparents, and families. KCFI also collaborated with Bayan Academy for Social Entrepreneurship and Human Resource Development on the Excellence in Educational Transformation Awards (EETA) and later OML awards for technology educators. Programming expanded to early childhood care and development (ECCD), environmental education through K-Likasan, English and literature with Gab to Go, and content acquisitions including PelikuLAB, Theater Hour, NHK Japan, Swiss Embassy, World Vision, and Khan Academy materials.

KCFI continued to recognize outstanding school engagement, awarding Bagumbayan Central School the 2011 KOSA for integrating community programs with KCh content. To strengthen both student learning and teacher development, the foundation launched Expert Teachers On Air (ETOA), which evolved into K-Hub and Ekonomiks, featuring experts like Cesar Tuliao, Kelvin Rodolfo, Doc Fe, and Dr. Biyo.

=== 2012 ===
In 2012, KCFI expanded its multimedia learning offerings by piloting On-Demand Packages, launching the Superintendents Leadership Program (SLP), and producing over 150 video episodes and e-learning modules. The K-LITE package, which includes a laptop, solar panel, projector, and speakers, continued to support off-grid teachers and learners under the OMLALI program, with 100 packages awarded to ALS supervisors and mobile teachers in Visayas and Mindanao, reaching more than 2,000 educators through content sharing. KCh also launched the environmental education series Puno ng Buhay to raise awareness on forest conservation and sustainable development, and produced Agham Aralin in partnership with the Citigroup Foundation, starring Kathryn Bernardo and Makisig Morales.

=== 2013 ===
In 2013, KCFI expanded its virtual and blended learning initiatives with the Excerpts from the Experts interstitial, building on its 2011 ETOA program to support both in-school and out-of-school learners. The foundation conducted the Learning Effectively through Enhanced Pedagogies (LEEP) program across its first 600 schools in Butuan, Guimaras, and Occidental Mindoro. KCFI also partnered with Insular Life to provide each of the 15 beneficiary schools in Batangas with Knowledge Channel's On-Demand (for K to 12) package and trained their teachers and principals through the LEEP Program. Later on, the foundation launched the Knowledge Channel Portable Media Library (KCPML), an offline resource containing over 500 curriculum-based video lessons and multimedia materials.

Partnerships that year included Landbank of the Philippines through the e-Dukasyon Program, producing Agricoolture videos hosted by Arron Villaflor to promote agriculture as a viable career, and with the Development Academy of the Philippines to integrate agricultural education into K–12. Other collaborations included Philippine Center for Philippine Development (Kwentong Kartero), TESDA (Pamilya Masigasig), SunLife Foundation (K-High Season 3), Manila Water Foundation and Manila Water Corporation (Agos), and USAID (Salam HS). KCFI also partnered with Noli de Castro to deliver Knowledge Channel On-Demand packages to schools affected by the Zamboanga siege. Additionally, the foundation acquired Tuldok Animation Studios' series "From Lines to Life: An Introduction to Animation."

=== 2014 ===
In 2014, KCFI celebrated its 15th anniversary with a flash mob and photo exhibit at Rockwell Powerplant Mall. The foundations reached over 3,000 schools nationwide, airing 2,500 curriculum-based episodes in partnership with DepEd. The foundation launched new digital learning materials through KCh Online, including interactive educational games such as Mga Pambansang Bayani, Philippine Regions, and Welcome to Water Town, and continued production of shows including Pamilya Masigasig (in partnership with TESDA), Carlos’ Blog, Kwentong Kartero, Kuwentong Pambata, Payong K-Lusugan (with the Department of Health and FHI360), and Hugas Sayaw with Unilever Philippines for handwashing awareness. KCFI also provided support to schools affected by the Zamboanga siege and typhoons through field visits and the LEEP Psychological First Aid (PFA) program, later developed into a video hosted by Atom Araullo. The foundation continued its Teacher-for-a-Day (TFAD) program and climate change initiatives, engaging students and Lopez Group employees in education and advocacy campaigns.

=== 2015 ===
In 2015, KCFI expanded its digital reach by airing on ABS-CBN TVplus, also known as the "Mahiwagang Black Box." The foundation launched the LEEP PFA program in partnership with the Psychological Association of the Philippines and funded by the ABS-CBN Foundation, which later was implemented in DepEd's own PFA training module. KCFI also participated in the technical working group for the implementing rules of the National Teacher’s Day law, officially designating October 5 as National Teacher's Day. The foundation's LEEP program trained 83 teachers and principals from 15 Metro Manila school divisions, while TFAD engaged corporate employees, including at Western Union, in educational volunteering to support students. KCh also launched new programming, including Puno ng Buhay Season 2 in partnership with Forest Foundation Philippines, and K-High: Math Matters with Sun Life Foundation, while conceptualizing MathDali, a financial literacy program for early grades.

=== 2016 ===
In 2016, KCFI launched MathDali, a comprehensive educational framework combining videos, interactive games, teacher workshops, session guides, and parent orientations. The foundation continued its AgriCOOLture program, hosted by Enchong Dee, and renewed its 10-year partnership with DepEd through former Education Secretary Armin Luistro. Under the 100 for 100 initiative, over 2,000 students and nearly 100 teachers in remote Camarines Norte gained access to KCh's K–12 curriculum-based resources, supported by Rotary International, the Rotary Foundation, SKYdirect satellite service, and TeleRed technical support. KCFI also signed a memorandum of agreement with the Global Alliance for Rabies Control and collaborated with the UBS Optimus Foundation.

=== 2017 ===
In 2017, KCFI partnered with Starmobile to donate 50 tablets to enhance Grade 4 mathematics learning. The foundation also partnered with GARC for rabies education, reconnected remote schools via Sky Direct, produced science programs with Department of Science and Technology (DOST) NCR, and commemorated its 18th anniversary with pilot reading programs in Sta. Rosa and Biñan, Laguna. KCFI also launched the Knowledge Channel Internship Program (KCIP) with over 70 interns in its first cohort.

KCFI continued its educational outreach through Knowledge Channel On the Go, LEEP-PFA training of 250+ teachers in Visayas, and the 100 for 100 project with Rotary Clubs to provide schools with television systems. New content included Estudyantipid Season 2, Science Says (with Reina Reyes), and Ready, Set, Read! in partnership with the Rotary Club of Makati Premier District (RCMPD).

=== 2018 ===
In 2018, KCFI expanded its reach through partnerships with Sky Cable, San Miguel Consolidated Global Power Inc., San Miguel Foundation, and Unilever Philippines, connecting remote schools in Davao Occidental, Palawan, Taytay, El Nido, and Cavite with educational KCTVs and KCPMLs. Programs and initiatives included Knowledge Channel On the Go with Marlo Mortel, Payong K-Lusugan: Safety with Animals in collaboration with the GARC, Science Says with resident astrophysicist Reina Reyes, and AgriCOOLture hosted by Enchong Dee in partnership with LandBank.

KCFI also trained educators nationwide through LEEP workshops, recognized 70 KCIP interns via the Cross Dissolve exhibit, and broadened financial literacy and consumer awareness programming with Insular Life. KCFI also launched PRIME, a professional development initiative for primary-grade teachers in collaboration with five partner universities, and released the official music video May K Ako.

=== 2019 ===
In 2019, KCFI launched several new educational programs, including Wikaharian, an animated literacy and language show for young learners hosted by Michelle Agas, and Basa Bilang, a fully animated early literacy and numeracy program for kindergarten and grades 1–3 piloted in Sta. Rosa, Laguna and Makati. KCFI also celebrated its 20th anniversary by recognizing 168 interns for their contributions to programs such as animated videos for Basa Bilang and Knowledge TV, renaming KCIP with Knowledge Channel Volunteer and Internship Program (KCVIP).

Key partnerships in this year included the Philippine Association for Communication Educators (PACE), and ABS-CBN by hosting Class Project Student Documentary Competition and delivering a session on how media can be used for social good during the 13th Pinoy Media Congress held last March 7–8, 2019 at the College of the Holy Spirit in Manila. Other partnerships include the Rotary Club, the Agricultural Training Institute, and Sumitomo Mitsui Banking Corporation, providing teacher training, Gift of Knowledge packages, and educational video production.

=== 2020 ===
In 2020, KCFI responded to crises with its emergency education initiatives, launching EduKalidad sa Kalamidad to support learners affected by the Taal Volcano eruption and the COVID-19 pandemic. The program provided curriculum-aligned videos, Knowledge TVs in evacuation centers, and online resources under the Stay at Home, Learn at Home campaign. KCFI also transitioned LEEP program to an online format, Knowledge Channel Training in the New Normal (KCTINN), reaching over 8,000 teachers and 700 schools nationwide. New partnerships with the Department of Social Welfare and Development (DSWD), APC partners, and LGUs supported early childhood development, while Knowledge TV and KCVIP internships expanded to international schools. KCFI also integrated its content on A2Z, Kumu, and PCTA platforms, ensuring continuous access to educational resources.

=== 2021 ===
In 2021, KCFI continued supporting learners during the COVID-19 pandemic through its School at Home campaign, launching live online programs such as Wikaharian Online World, MathDali On Live, Knowledge On The Go Live, and Art Smart with Teacher Precious. The foundation partnered with ABS-CBN Sagip Kapamilya for Tulong-Tulong sa Pag-Ahon Para sa Edukasyon, providing 2,000 learner kits to schools affected by Typhoon Ulysses, and with Mary's Way Foundation, Globe, and ABS-CBN for the Big Blue Hearts Campaign to improve Grade 1 reading skills in Sta. Rosa, Laguna. KCFI resumed digital TV broadcasts through a partnership with BEAM and continued its environmental education program EcoProject: Kilos Kabataan Para sa Kapaligiran in partnership with Unilever.

=== 2022 ===
In 2022, KCFI expanded its reach through CIGNAL Ch. 146, providing 1,500 curriculum-aligned video lessons to over 2 million subscribers and launching the School Anywhere campaign to support DepEd's blended learning. The foundation continued its environmental education program, EcoProject: Kilos Kabataan Para sa Kapaligiran, in partnership with Unilever-Breeze Philippines, promoting environmental awareness among students, teachers, and parents. KCFI also launched TalkED: Early Childhood Series, an online educational talk hosted by Bianca Gonzalez, focusing on child development. KCFI also joined the ECCD Council to advance mental health initiatives for young Filipino children and their families.

=== 2023 ===
In 2023, KCFI continued its literacy and numeracy initiatives through Basa Bilang, Ready, Set, Read!, and MathDali, reaching schools under DepEd's Santa Rosa City division. KCFI also implemented the I Love You 1000: Batang #Laking1000 program in partnership with the National Nutrition Council, focusing on early childhood nutrition and development. ECD advocacy expanded through research-based educational videos, LEEP training for teachers, and participation in a groundbreaking regional study on parenting and child health. Health and inclusivity were highlighted through the launch of Health TB: Aksyon Kalusugan with sign language interpretation. KCFI's KCVIP celebrated the graduation of 99 interns and 24 volunteers.

=== 2024 ===
In 2024, KCFI significantly expanded its educational reach through the launch of several environmental and literacy-based initiatives. Partnering with the CEMEX Philippines Foundation and Save the Children, KCFI introduced Tropang K!-Likasan and Lakbay Aral, programs specifically designed to teach climate change mitigation and waste management to learners aged 3 to 10. The foundation also celebrated the fourth year of EcoPlay in collaboration with Unilever-Breeze, promoting physical education and cultural resilience by integrating traditional Filipino games into the curriculum across school divisions in Marikina, Taguig, and Quezon City.

Throughout the year, KCFI focused heavily on ECD and foundational skills in math and reading. The foundation hosted its inaugural Teachers’ Conference, aimed at empowering 30,000 educators with strategies for teaching primary subjects, and launched new episodes of MathDali Grade 1 in partnership with BDO Foundation and Huawei Philippines. To bridge the digital divide, KCFI distributed KCTV and KCPML packages—containing over 1,500 video lessons—to various remote schools, including the Banate IP School and the Lopez School of Aeta Community, ensuring that indigenous learners had access to high-quality digital materials.

Strategic partnerships remained a cornerstone of KCFI's operations as they renewed a major MOA with DepEd under Secretary Sonny Angara to develop new curriculum-based content. The foundation also branched into specialized programming by collaborating with the NCCT to air the Makabata Block and signing an agreement with the Justice Cecilia Muñoz Palma Foundation to produce historical episodes on human rights. Additionally, KCFI partnered with the Provincial Government of Bulacan to broadcast SINEliksik Bulacan documentaries, effectively utilizing television to preserve and promote local cultural heritage for the youth.

=== 2025 ===
In 2025, KCFI accelerated its efforts in ECD and multimedia integration through high-level policy advocacy and grassroots training. A key highlight was the foundation's participation in a roundtable with the Second Congressional Commission on Education (EDCOM 2) and the Asia Philanthropy Circle to align philanthropic efforts with public sector goals for early childhood care. This commitment was operationalized through the launch of the Kayang-Kaya Para sa Bata! Certificate Program in Baras, Rizal—a pilot initiative designed to upskill child development workers—and a landmark partnership with TESDA to develop competency-based training for educators nationwide.

The foundation significantly broadened its curriculum-based content by partnering with diverse sectors to produce specialized video lessons. Collaborating with AIA Philippines, KCFI produced the Gen H: Generation Healthy series to promote health and science, while a partnership with the Energy Development Corporation (EDC) resulted in new episodes of Wow focused on biodiversity and tourism. Financial literacy remained a priority through new episodes of Estudyantipid with BPI Foundation, and cultural education was bolstered by the launch of 25 new Wikaharian episodes for Grade 2 in partnership with the NCCA. Additionally, KCFI joined forces with Solar Learning and DepEd to soft-launch DepEd TV, further democratizing access to quality instructional materials.

Engagement with learners and teachers was intensified through large-scale interactive events and digital capacity-building. KCFI concluded the EcoPlay Palarong Pinoy and LarOlympics series across Luzon, Visayas, and Mindanao, encouraging holistic development through traditional Filipino games. For educators, the foundation hosted several free online conferences, including WATCH. LEARN. TEACH. and sessions on multimedia integration, which equipped over 3,000 stakeholders with strategies for 21st-century teaching. The year also saw the expansion of KCVIP, which celebrated 82 graduates who contributed to the foundation's mission of nation-building through education.

== Awards and Recognition ==
=== 2025 ===
- Asian Academy Creative Awards 2025
  - National Winner for Best Children's Programme: Ready, Set, Read!
- Anak TV Seal Awards
  - Anak TV Seal for child-sensitive content (Television Category):
    - AgriKids
    - EcoPlay
    - Estudyantipid
    - Siklo ng Enerhiya
    - Kasaysayan TV
    - Payong K-Lusugan
    - Wikaharian.
- National Council for Children's Television (NCCT)
  - Outstanding Commitment to Child-Friendly Content Standards: Knowledge Channel
  - Exemplary Adherence to Child-Friendly Content Standards: MathDali
  - Exemplary Adherence to Child-Friendly Content Standards: Wikaharian
- Asia Academy Creative Awards
  - National Winner - Best Children's Program Category (Philippines): Ready, Set, Read!
- 43rd Agora Awards
  - Agora Outstanding Achievement in Advocacy Marketing
- Batangas I Electric Cooperative, Inc.
  - Plaque of Appreciation for Contribution to GNPower Dinginin's DigitaEskwela
- National Teachers' Month Coordinating Council (NTMCC) - Metrobank Foundation
  - Recognition for significant contributions to the celebration of National Teachers’ Month 2024
- iACADEMY
  - Outstanding Industry Partner Award for KCVIP
- National Teachers College
  - Gawad Flora A. Ylagan for Eminent Women in Education
- Yapak Elementary School
  - Gawad Kabalikat Award
- Sto. Niño Integrated School
  - Plaque of Appreciation from Sto. Niño Integrated School
- DOST-STII STARBOOKS
  - Circle of Collaborators Award
- 28th KBP Golden Dove Awards
  - Best Children's Program: MathDali Grade 1
  - Best Culture and Arts Program: Wow Bukidnon
- 2025 LCF CSR Guild Awards
  - Finalist for Outstanding CSR Project in Arts and Culture: Basa Bilang Project
- 9th Developmental Social Enterprise Awards (DSEA)
  - Finalist at the Developmental Social Enterprise Awards
- Schools Division Office of Rizal
  - Certificate of Appreciation from the Schools Division Office of Rizal
- Ernesto Rondon High School
  - Pillar of Partnership Award
- Asia CEO Awards 2025
  - Circle of Excellence - Woman Leader of the Year (Finalist Trophy)
- Rex Education
  - Gawad Edukampyon for Partners
- Polytechnic University of the Philippines (PUP)
  - Partner Appreciation - KCVIP
- Philippine Manufacturing Co. of Murata (PMM)
  - Partner Appreciation

=== 2024 ===
- 6th Gawad Lasallianeta
  - Green ZEAL Award for Excellence in Education Innovation
- Bantay Bata 163
  - Recognition as an Invaluable Partner.
- Department of Education (DepEd)
  - Department of Education Exceptional Partner Recognition 2024
- Metrobank Foundation
  - Partner in Empowerment, Advocacy, and Commitment to Excellence (PEACE) Awardee
- iAcademy
  - Outstanding Industry Partner Award for KCVIP
- 18th UP Gandingan Awards
  - Finalist - Most Development-Oriented Environmental Program: Wow
  - Finalist - Most Development-Oriented Environmental Program: Musikantahan
  - Finalist - Most Development-Oriented Musical Segment/Program: AgriKids
  - Finalist - Most Development-Oriented Children's Program: Agricoolture
  - Finalist - Most Development-Oriented Documentary Program: Puno Ng Buhay
  - Finalist - Most Development-Oriented Magazine Program
- LCF CSR Guild Awards
  - Finalist - Outstanding CSR in Environment (EcoProject Year 3 with Breeze)
- NCCT 27th Anniversary
  - Exemplary Adherence to Child-Friendly Content Standards: Puno ng Buhay
  - Exemplary Adherence to Child-Friendly Content Standards: MathDali
  - Outstanding Commitment to Child-Friendly Content Standards: Knowledge Channel
- 46th Catholic Mass Media Awards
  - Best Children and Youth Program: AgriKids
- Anak TV Seal Awards 2024
  - Television Category: Siklo ng Enerhiya, MathDali, AgriKids, Tropang K!Likasan, Lakbay Aral, Wow: Bukidnon.
  - Online Category: MathDali Online World, Knowledge Channel's Art Smart, Knowledge On The Go, Wikaharian Online World
- Anak TV - Sinebata
  - Professional Fiction Category (7 years old and under): Kwentoons
- 5th Gawad Kaagapay
  - Most Outstanding Stakeholder Award; Outstanding Stakeholder Award

=== 2023 ===
- iAcademy
  - Outstanding Industry Partner Award for KCVIP
- 17th UP CBS Gandingan Awards
  - Best TV Program Host Award: Edric Calma
- LCF CSR Guild Awards
  - Outstanding CSR Project in Environment
- Catholic Mass Media Awards
  - Best Children and Youth Program: MathDali Grade 1
- Anak TV Seal Awards 2023
  - Television Category: AgriKids, ILY1000, Ready, Set, Read!
  - Online Category: Art Smart, Knowledge On The Go, Kwentoons, MathDali Online World, Wikaharian Online World

=== 2022 ===
- iAcademy
  - Outstanding Industry Partner Award for KCVIP
- LCF CSR Guild Awards
  - Finalist for Outstanding CSR Collaboration Project: Ready, Set, Read! with Security Bank Foundation
- 44th The Catholic Mass Media Awards
  - Special Citation under Children and Youth Program

=== 2021 ===
- CSR Guild Awards
  - Outstanding CSR Project in Education

=== 2019 ===
- Lopez Achievement Award
  - Award for Operations Management
- Anak TV Seal Award 2019
  - Estudyantipid, Puno ng Buhay
- Sinebata
  - Professional Fiction Category (under 7 years old): Kwentong Pambata: Si Bino, Si Buboy at si Bantay
  - Professional Fiction Category (13–17 years old): Kwentong Kartero: Teenage Dream or Nightmare
- LCF Outstanding Collaboration Project
  - For CommEd initiative at Talaga Elementary School

=== 2018 ===
- Anak TV Seal Award 2018
  - Wow, Mathdali, Agricoolture
- Deped RegX, Northern Mindanao Division of Lanao Del Norte
  - Gawad Sarimanok (Seal of Excellence) on Educational Support Services

=== 2017 ===
- Sinebata, Anak TV (1st Southeast Asian Prix Jeunesse)
  - Fiction for Teens (13–17 years old): Salam: Bagong Kaibigan

=== 2016 ===
- Lopez Achievement Awards
  - Award for Public Responsibility Category: Psychological First Aid: Mental Wellness for Educators

=== 2013 ===
- The Catholic Mass Media Award
  - Best Website
  - Best Adult Educational/Cultural Show Finalist: WOW

=== 2007 ===
- Federation of Catholic Schools Alumni Associations (FeCaSAA)
  - The Benigno S. Aquino Jr. Award for Social Artistry
- Southeast Asian Foundation for Children and TV
  - The Anak TV Seal Award for Salam
- DepEd Region VI-Western Visayas, Division of Iloilo City
  - Outstanding Benefactor Award V

=== 2006 ===
- Lopez Achievement Award
  - Public Responsibility to TEAMM
- Ateneo de Manila University
  - Parangal Lingkod Sambayanan (Public Service Award)
- Chicago Filipino American Hall of Fame Award
  - Peace Builder - International Award

=== 2005 ===
- Gold Quill Awards 2005 (IABC Philippines)
  - Award of Excellence: Lakad Mo, Pangarap Ko
- 40th Anvil Awards
  - Award of Merit: Lakad Mo, Pangarap Ko
- Lopez Achievement Award
  - Award for Public Responsibility: KCFI’s Team-Mindanao
- Asian Forum on Corporate Social Responsibility
  - Best Education Support Program
- The Catholic Mass Media Awards
  - Jaime Cardinal Sin Serviam Award
- DepEd's Adopt-A-School Program
  - Recognition for supporting DepEd

=== 2003 ===
- Lopez Achievement Award
  - Special Citation

== See also ==
- ABS-CBN
- Pilipinas HD (defunct)
- DepEd TV
- Solar Learning
