= Perry Mariano =

- Born: Ceferino Mariano; February 20, 1951
- Died: April 28, 2026 (aged 75); Quezon City, Philippines
- Occupations: Businessman, sports executive
- Known for: Cofounder of Bugsy Promotions

Ceferino "Perry" Mariano (February 20, 1951 – April 28, 2026) was a Filipino businessman, sports executive and billiards patron.

== Career ==
=== Billiards ===
Perry Mariano established Bugsy Promotions with his wife, Verna in 2002. The billiards organization produced Filipino billiard champions such as Dennis Orcollo, Carlo Biado, Johann Chua and Ronato Alcano. Mariano became known in organizing local tournaments with Putch Puyat helping in Filipino players compete overseas.

Mariano and Reli de Leon of Accel co-founded of the Billiard League (B-League) which had its first season in 2010–11.

Mariano was also the founder and former president of the Billiards Managers and Players Association of the Philippines. In 2012, he was appointed as the secretary general for local affairs of the Billiard Sports Confederation of the Philippines. Mariano also owns the Lucky Break Billiards Hall.

=== Other business ventures ===
Mariano also owned the Hermes Sports Bar along West Avenue in Quezon City as well as other nightclubs and disco joints in the city including Kampo and Thunderdome. He was a former leader of the United Entertainment Congress of the Philippines and the Association of Club, Karaoke and Disco Owners. He also ran a small town lottery (STL) business.

== Personal life ==
Mariano was married to Verna Mariano. Their son Hadley became a nine-ball player debuting in 2009. Hadley later established the Sharks Billiards Association, where "sharking" or actively taunting your opponents is allowed. The elder Mariano, while watches the games of his son's league was skeptical about this deviation from traditional billiards.

== Death ==
Mariano and his driver were shot by motorcycle-riding assailants in the afternoon of April 28, 2026 near the GMA Network Center. The driver was declared dead on arrival at the East Avenue Medical Center in Quezon City while Mariano died after succumbing to injuries in the hospital.
