= Premier Sports (Philippine TV channel) =

Philippine pay sports television channel

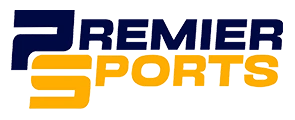
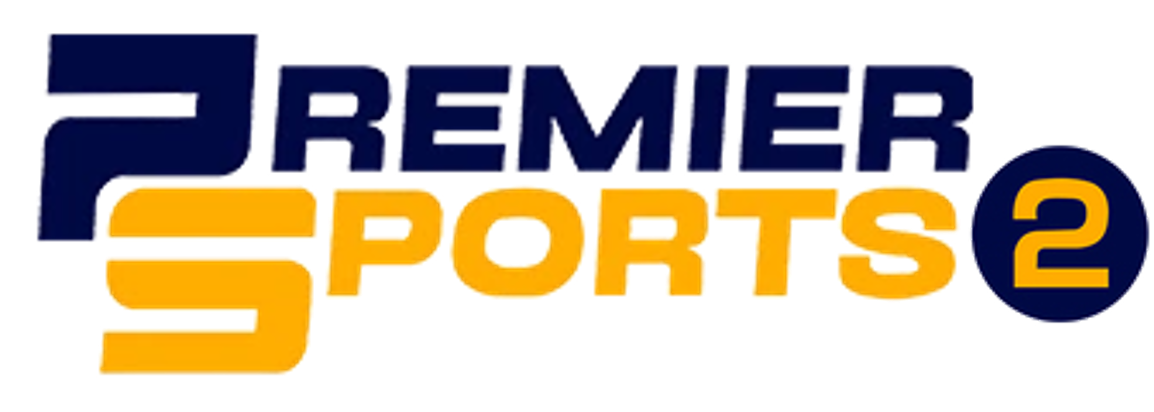
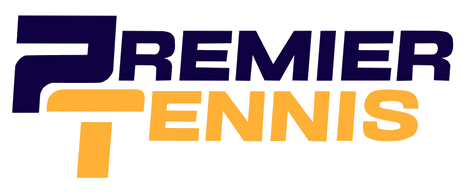
- Country: Philippines
- Broadcast area: Philippines
- Headquarters: Mandaluyong, Metro Manila, Philippines

Programming
- Languages: English, Filipino
- Picture format: 1080i (HDTV) (downscaled to 480i for the SDTV feed)

Ownership
- Owner: TAP Digital Media Ventures Corporation
- Sister channels: TAP Action Flix; TAP Edge; TAP Movies; TAP Sports; TAP TV

History
- Launched: Premier Football: February 17, 2020; 6 years ago; Premier Sports: October 1, 2021; 5 years ago; Premier Sports 2: January 10, 2022; 4 years ago; Premier Tennis: January 5, 2026; 9 months ago
- Former names: Premier Sports 2: Premier Tennis (2020–2022)

Links
- Website: tapdmv.com

Availability

Terrestrial
- Cignal TV Nationwide: Channel 272 (HD) as Premier Sports; Channel 273 (HD) as Premier Sports 2
- Sky Cable Metro Manila: Channel 140 (SD); Channel 176 (HD) as Premier Sports; Channel 264 (HD) as Premier Sports 2 Channel 265 (HD) as Premier Tennis
- Converge Vision / SkyTV Metro Manila: Channel 168 as Premier Sports; Channel 169 as Premier Sports 2 Channel 170 as Premier Football
- Sky Direct Metro Manila: Channel 47 as Premier Sports; Channel 48 as Premier Sports 2 Channel 49 as Premier Tennis
- G Sat Nationwide: Channel 52 (SD) as Premier Sports; Channel 70 (HD) as Premier Sports 2

Streaming media
- Blast TV: Internet Protocol television (Philippines only; requires monthly subscription)
- Cignal Play: Watch Live (Philippines only; requires monthly subscription)
- Samsung TV Plus: Internet Protocol television (Philippines only)

Premier Sports is a 24-hour Philippine pay television channel dedicated to sporting events owned by TAP Digital Media Ventures Corporation. It serves as a "secondary" sports channel of TAP Sports.

It made its official launch on October 1, 2021, as a direct response to the closure of the Fox Sports channels for the said region.

== Sister channels ==
=== Premier Football ===
Premier Football is a dedicated football channel. It broadcasts selected coverages of international football leagues. It was launched on February 17, 2020, and ended on January 4, 2026.

=== Premier Sports 2 ===
Premier Sports 2 is a second sports channel under the Premier brand. It primarily broadcasts WTA tennis and PGA Tour golf tournaments, as well as rugby and athletics.

It was launched on February 17, 2020, as Premier Tennis, which broadcasts all of the ATP and WTA tournaments throughout the year.

On January 10, 2022, the channel was renamed as Premier Sports 2, eventually adding PGA Tour golf tournaments, rugby and athletics to the lineup.

=== Premier Tennis ===
Premier Tennis is a dedicated tennis channel. Originally launched in 2020 and closed in 2022, it is set for relaunch in January 2026 and will exclusively airing ATP men's tennis (after TAP DMV has acquired broadcast rights for the latter).

== Programming and coverage rights ==
=== American football ===
- NFL
- UFL

=== Athletics ===
- Wanda Diamond League (shared with Eurosport)

=== Association football (soccer) ===
- A-League Men (in 2024-25 shared with SPOTV)

=== Autoracing ===
- NASCAR (highlight show only)

=== Golf ===
- Asian Tour
- DP World Tour
- LPGA

=== Ice Hockey ===
- NHL

=== Combat sports ===
- Cage Warriors
- PFL
- Superbouts boxing events

=== Padel tennis ===
- Hexagon (co-licensed with DAZN and SPOTV)

=== Rugby union ===
- World Rugby Sevens Series

=== Snooker ===
- British Open

=== Tennis ===
- ATP (shared with BeIN Sports)
  - ATP 250
  - ATP 500
  - ATP 1000
  - ATP Challenger Tour
- WTA
  - WTA 250
  - WTA 500
  - WTA 1000
  - WTA Finals

=== Other sports ===
- Professional Bull Riders
- SailGP (shared with SPOTV)

=== Non-sports / sports reality / magazine programming ===
- Golf Academy
- School of Golf
- Trans World Sport
- The Ultimate Fighter
- Monster Jam

=== Segments ===
- Ancient Feats
- Peculiar Pursuits
- Larong Lokal
- Unfiltered with Enzo
- Wild World of Sports

=== Previous broadcasting rights ===
- Premier League (2020–2022)
- Scottish Professional Football League (2020–2022)
- Formula One
- All Elite Wrestling
  - AEW Dynamite
  - AEW pay-per-view events
- Saudi Pro League
- UEFA
  - UEFA Champions League
  - UEFA Europa League
  - UEFA Conference League
  - UEFA Super Cup
  - Volleyball World
- Euroleague
- Combate Global
- Bundesliga
- CONMEBOL
- DFB-Pokal
- Serie A
- Eredivisie
- Chinese Super League
- K League 1
- Canadian Premier League
- UEFA
  - UEFA Nations League
  - 2026 FIFA World Cup qualifiers
  - UEFA Euro 2028 qualification
  - UEFA Weekly Magazine
- Philippines Football League
- PGA Tour
- UFC
  - UFC Classics
  - UFC Fight Night events
  - UFC Reloaded
  - UFC Submissions
  - Dana White's Contender Series

== See also ==
- TAP Sports
- Fox Sports Asia
- Solar Sports
- One Sports
- BeIN Sports
- SPOTV
