= Dianne dela Fuente =

- Born: Dianne Meriam Soberano Manlosa Tiongson-Go; November 18, 1981 (age 44); Daet, Camarines Norte, Philippines
- Other name: Dianne dela Fuente-Tiongson
- Occupations: Actress, singer
- Years active: 1995–present
- Agent: Star Magic (1995–2006)
- Musical career
- Genres: Pop, OPM
- Instrument: Vocals
- Years active: 1995–2006, 2024–present
- Label: Star Music
- Spouse: Ian Tiongson (m. 2003)

Dianne Meriam Soberano Manlosa Tiongson-Go (born November 18, 1981), professionally known as Dianne dela Fuente, is a Filipino actress and singer.

== Life and career ==
Dianne dela Fuente was born Diana Soberano Manlosa to parents Celia and Filemon. She has four siblings: Ronan, Sonia, Filemon III and Marlo.

Dianne dela Fuente made her television debut, as a series regular, on the now-defunct children's gag-variety show Ang TV.

She was cast as Maria Amor in the ABS-CBN drama series Pangako Sa 'Yo in 2000 and Mithi on the edutainment Pahina.

In 2001, she played Minerva on Sa Dulo Ng Walang Hanggan and also made her debut as a VJ on Knowledge Channel's historical educational program Kasaysayan TV.

Dela Fuente sang theme song of the 2002 Star Cinema film Got 2 Believe and reprised her role in Pahina, which was renewed after its cancellation in 2001. She was included in the Gawad KKK-Galing ng Kabataan "10 Most Outstanding Youth of the Philippines". She also received the Parangal ng Bayan "Most Promising Performer" award in the same year.

After a year, she graduated with a degree in communication arts from the Angelicum College.

She played the lead role in the TRUMPETS stage production of The Little Mermaid in 2006, her co-stars were KC Concepcion, and Carol Banawa. She also played the character Bising in MUSICAT's Alikabok.

She tried being a news anchor for CLTV 36.

She was back as an actress via False Positive in GMA Network starring Xian Lim and Glaiza de Castro.

In 2023, she plays the role of Dra. Patricia Menor as the neurosurgery department chief resident in the GMA Network medical drama Abot-Kamay na Pangarap.

== Filmography ==
=== Film ===
Year	Title	Role	Notes
2003	Ngayong Nandito Ka	Menchie	

=== Television ===
Year	Title	Role	Network	Notes
1992–1997	Ang TV	Herself	ABS-CBN	Series regular
1997–1998	Esperanza	Marivic	ABS-CBN	
1995–2006	ASAP	Herself	ABS-CBN	Performer
2000	Pangako Sa 'Yo	Maria Amor de Jesus / Clarissa Barcial	ABS-CBN	
2000–2001	Pahina	Mithi	ABS-CBN	
2001	Sa Dulo Ng Walang Hanggan	Minerva	ABS-CBN	
2001	Kasaysayan TV	Herself	Knowledge Channel	Host
2002–2004	Kapalaran	Maureen	ABS-CBN	
2007	CLTV Balitaan	Herself	CLTV	News anchor
2020	Wowowin	Herself	GMA Network	Guest
2022	False Positive	Maritess Soto	GMA Network	
2023–2024	Abot-Kamay na Pangarap	Dra. Patricia Menor	GMA Network	Recurring
2025	It's Showtime	Herself	Kapamilya Channel; A2Z; ALLTV; GMA Network	Guest
2025	Encantadia Chronicles: Sang'gre	Gurna	GMA Network	
