= TAP Movies =

Philippine pay television channel

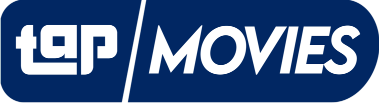
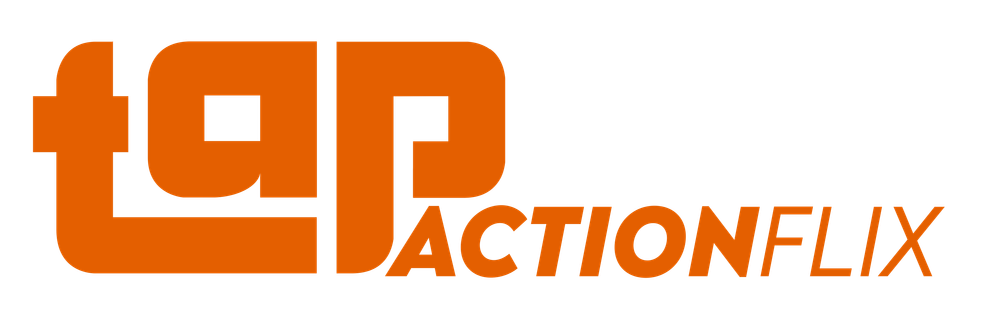
- Country: Philippines
- Broadcast area: Nationwide
- Headquarters: Mandaluyong, Metro Manila

Programming
- Language: English
- Picture format: 1080i (HDTV) (downscaled to 480i for the SDTV feed)

Ownership
- Owner: TAP Digital Media Ventures Corporation
- Sister channels: Premier Football; Premier Sports; Premier Sports 2; Studio Universal; TAP Edge; TAP Sports; TAP TV

History
- Launched: TAP Movies, TAP Action Flix: September 20, 2021 (test broadcast), October 1, 2021 (full launch); TAP Silog: October 30, 2025
- Replaced: Viva Cinema (Cignal channel space); All TV (SatLite channel renumbering space)

Links
- Website: tapdmv.com

Availability

Terrestrial
- Cignal TV Nationwide: TAP Movies: Channel 50 (SD), Channel 215 (HD); TAP Silog: Channel 42
- SatLite Nationwide: TAP Movies: Channel 75 (SD); TAP Silog: Channel 35
- Sky Cable Metro Manila: TAP Movies: Channel 55 (SD), Channel 170 (HD); TAP Action Flix: Channel 78 (SD); Channel 177 (HD)
- SkyTV Metro Manila: TAP Movies: Channel 98; TAP Action Flix: Channel 99
- Cablelink Metro Manila: TAP Movies: Channel 47; TAP Action Flix: Channel 48; TAP Silog: Channel 33
- Sky Direct Nationwide: TAP Movies: Channel 36; TAP Action Flix: Channel 37; TAP Silog: Channel 35
- G Sat Nationwide: TAP Movies: Channel 24; TAP Action Flix: Channel 25

Streaming media
- Blast TV: Internet Protocol television (Philippines only; requires monthly subscription)

TAP Movies (stylized as tap MOVIES) is a Philippine pay television channel dedicated to Hollywood films owned by TAP Digital Media Ventures Corporation. It was launched on October 1, 2021.

== Programming ==
Much like other English-language movie channels, TAP Movies mainly carries films from major Hollywood film studios Universal Pictures, Paramount Pictures, Skydance Media, Filmrise, Sony Pictures, Metro-Goldwyn-Mayer, Lionsgate Films, Vine Alternative Investments, Voltage Pictures, and Millennium Media among others. In addition, Filipino-dubbed (or Tagalized) versions of select movie titles are also aired on weekends from August 2024 until March 2025.

In addition to movies, the channel also airs TV miniseries and live theatrical musicals.

== Sister channels ==
=== TAP Action Flix ===
TAP Action Flix is the secondary movie channel of TAP DMV. It features Hollywood films related to horror, suspense, thriller, sports and action genres.

=== TAP Silog ===
TAP Silog is the movie channel of TAP DMV. It is a complimentary Hollywood movie channel to TAP Movies but airs Tagalog-dubbed versions of the said genre. It is named after the Tapsilog, a popular breakfast dish consisting of Tapa and Silog.

== See also ==
- TAP TV
- TAP Edge
- TAP Sports
- Premier Sports
