= TAP Sports =

- Country: Philippines
- Broadcast area: Nationwide
- Headquarters: Mandaluyong, Metro Manila

Programming
- Language: English
- Picture format: 1080i (HDTV) (downscaled to 480i for the SDTV feed)

Ownership
- Owner: TAP Digital Media Ventures Corporation
- Sister channels: Premier Sports; TAP Action Flix; TAP Edge; TAP Movies; TAP TV

History
- Launched: April 14, 2019; 7 years ago
- Former names: TAP Sports 1 (2019–2020)

Links
- Website: tapdmv.com/tapsports

Availability

Terrestrial
- Cignal TV Nationwide: Channel 94
- SatLite Nationwide: Channel 56
- Sky Cable Metro Manila: Channel 188 (HD)
- SkyTV Metro Manila: Channel 166
- Sky Direct Nationwide: Channel 46
- G Sat Nationwide: Channel 32

Streaming media
- Blast TV: Internet Protocol television (Philippines only; requires monthly subscription)
- Cignal Play: Watch Live (Philippines only; requires monthly subscription)
- Samsung TV Plus: Internet Protocol television (Philippines only)

TAP Sports (stylized as tap Sports) is a Philippine pay television network of sports channels owned by TAP Digital Media Ventures Corporation. It was launched on April 14, 2019, under two separate channels carried by Sky Cable, and was later relaunched the following year.

The TAP Sports network has four channels: the main channel itself, and the Premier Sports channels.

== History ==
On April 14, 2019, TAP Sports was launched by TAP DMV on cable provider Sky Cable. Back then, it used to be broadcast on two separate channels covering all live tennis events: TAP Sports 1 (airing the men's ATP tournaments) and TAP Sports 2 (airing the women's WTA tournaments).

On February 17, 2020, the TAP Sports network was relaunched, this time as a general sports channel replacing TAP Sports 1. On the same day, it launched 4 new sister channels: TAP W (women-centric sports; replacing TAP Sports 2), TAP Edge (action/adventure/outdoor sports; including EDGEsport programming), Premier Tennis (ATP and WTA), and Premier Football (soccer).

On September 20, 2021, TAP DMV launched Premier Sports, a complimentary channel of TAP Sports.

== Blast Sports ==
Blast Sports is a digital sports-oriented channel of TAP DMV. It began its broadcast on BEAM TV's digital terrestrial broadcast nationwide on January 17, 2024 in soft launch mode. The new channel offers selected sporting events that also airs on TAP Sports and Premier Sports.

The channel ceased broadcast on BEAM TV on September 1, 2025. It was replaced by UFC TV on its channel space. Meanwhile, the channel continued streaming on Blast TV.

== Programming ==
=== List of sports broadcasting rights ===
Note: Some sporting rights are sublicensed from DAZN and FITE TV.

==== Auto racing ====
- IndyCar Series
- FIA World Rallycross Championship (WRX)

==== Badminton ====
- Badminton World Federation

==== Basketball ====
- Liga ACB
- Maharlika Pilipinas Basketball League (shared with Solar Sports under sub-licensing)
- NBL Pilipinas

==== Billiards ====
- Sharks Billiards Association (co-shared with One Sports, RPTV and PTV Sports Network)

==== Boxing ====
- Golden Boy Classics
- Zuffa Boxing
- Superbouts

==== Cycling ====
- Tour de Suisse
- Union Cycliste Internationale

==== eSports ====
- Arena eSports
- ELEAGUE
- MPL Philippines

==== Football ====
- FIFA World Cup (in 2026, the coverage distributed by Aleph)
- FIFA ASEAN Cup

==== Combat sports ====
- Bare Knuckle Fighting Championship

==== Multi sports ====
- Paralympic Games

==== Volleyball ====
- Shakey's Super League

==== Wrestling ====
- Heroes of Lucha Libre
- Women of Wrestling

==== Other sports ====
- EDGEsport
- EDGEsportstories
- NFL (select postseason games only)

=== Sports reality / magazine programming ===
- Drive
- Jay Leno's Garage
- MotorClub
- OnPoint
- Straight Up Steve Austin
- World's Strongest Man
- Monster Jam

=== Segments ===
- Ancient Feats
- Peculiar Pursuits
- Larong Lokal
- Unfiltered with Enzo
- Wild World of Sports

=== Previous programming ===
- ASEAN Championship
- National Basketball League (Australia)
- B.League
- EuroLeague (now moved on One Sports and its live streaming, Pilipinas Live starting the 2025–26 season)
- Enfusion
- Professional Fighters League
- ONE Warrior Series Philippines
- W Series
- Porsche Super Cup
- Chinese Basketball Association
- Sinag Liga Asya
- WNBA
- NAASCU
- TNA Wrestling
  - TNA Impact!
  - TNA pay-per-view events
- WWE (now moved to Netflix since January 2026)
  - WWE Raw
  - WWE SmackDown
  - WWE NXT
  - WWE NXT UK
  - WWE Main Event
  - WWE Bottom Line
  - WWE Afterburn
  - This Week in WWE
- Filipino Pro Wrestling
- Action Sports World
- Badminton Unlimited
- BattleBots
- Caffeine and Octane
- FIBA Weekly
- The Mike and Cole Show
