= TAP Digital Media Ventures Corporation =

Philippine media and entertainment company

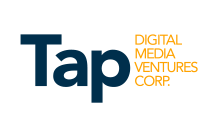
- Logo used since 2023
- Trade name: TAP DMV
- Type: Private
- Industry: Media
- Founded: February 1, 2018; 8 years ago
- Founder: Renen De Guia; Celinda De Guia; Peter Chan Liong
- Headquarters: 777 Katarungan St., Plainview Village, Mandaluyong, Metro Manila, Philippines
- Area served: Philippines
- Key people: Renen De Guia (chairman); Celinda De Guia (president); Peter Chan Liong (chief executive officer); Gonzalo De Guia (chief technology officer)
- Products: Television channels Streaming media
- Brands: TAP Action Flix; TAP Silog; TAP Edge; TAP Movies; TAP Sports; TAP TV; Premier Sports; Premier Football; Blast TV
- Services: Cable television, Sportscasting, Over-the-top media service
- Parent: Ovation Productions
- Website: tapdmv.com

TAP Digital Media Ventures Corporation (TAP DMV) is a Philippine media and entertainment company which oversees the operations of its 24-hour linear television channels and a digital over-the-top media service. It is founded by Renen and Celinda De Guia (owners of live events company Ovation Productions) and former Solar Entertainment Corporation chief operating officer Peter Chan Liong.

TAP DMV owns 8 pay television channels and has programming/coverage rights agreement with international broadcasters such as Comcast (NBCUniversal, Sky Group), Paramount Skydance, Sony Pictures, ITV Studios, DAZN Group, Endeavor, and CJ ENM.

== History ==
TAP DMV was founded on February 1, 2018. It launched EDGEsport Philippines on the same year under a branding license agreement from its owner IMG. It aired action-centric and combat sports.

In July 2021, TAP DMV signed a licensing rights with Filipino boxing icon Manny Pacquiao to secure exclusive broadcast rights of his recently concluded bout against Yordenis Ugas via its own cable channels. In August 2021, TAP DMV was awarded the local rights to the 2020 Summer Paralympics games. In August 2023, TAP DMV partnered with Converge ICT, and launched over-the-top (OTT) streaming service named BlastTV.

== Assets ==
=== Channels ===
==== Current channels ====
- TAP Edge - Drama-centric entertainment channel. It airs canned shows from the U.S., focusing on action and crime/suspense drama series, and news/current affairs. Formerly a dedicated EDGEsport and other action sports programming channel.
- TAP TV - Lifestyle and general entertainment channel. It airs canned shows from the U.S., focusing on variety and talk shows, reality drama, and movies. The channel was originally a female-centric sports channel known as TAP Sports 2 and later TAP W.
- TAP Movies - All-movie channel. It airs mainstream Hollywood films from Universal Pictures, Paramount Pictures, Skydance Media, Filmrise, Sony Pictures, Metro-Goldwyn-Mayer, Lionsgate Films, among others. It was Launched in October 2021.
- TAP Action Flix - dedicated movie channel which currently airs action, crime, and thriller movies. It was launched in October 2021.
- TAP Silog - dedicated movie channel which currently airs Tagalog-dubbed versions of selected Hollywood movies.
- TAP Sports - 24-hour sports channel. Formerly known as TAP Sports 1, the channel carries a variety of sporting events such as the Euroleague, National Basketball League (Australia), Golden Boy Promotions, and the BWF, as well as local sporting events including Sharks Billiards Association and the Shakey's Super League among others.
- Premier Sports - Complimentary channel of the TAP Sports network. The channel will air top-notch international sports events from UFC, NFL, NHL, UEFA, and the FIVB, among others. It was launched in October 2021.
- Premier Sports 2 - Counterpart channel to Premier Sports. It broadcasts all of the PGA Tour and WTA tournaments throughout the year, as well as rugby union and athletics.
- Premier Football - Dedicated football (soccer) channel. It broadcasts selected coverage of international football leagues, including the UEFA, A-League Men, and Bundesliga, among others.
- Premier Tennis - A dedicated tennis channel where it broadcast ATP men's tennis tournaments.
- Blast TV-exclusive linear/FAST channels:
  - Blast Movies - Hollywood movies channel.
  - Blast X - Anime-centric channel.
  - Comic U - Fantasy & sci-fi channel.
  - Fight Plus - Digital channel that airs combat sporting events.
  - Real Blast - Reality and talk show-oriented channel.

==== Distributed channels ====
- Abante TV
- Bilyonaryo News Channel
- EDGEsport
- Setanta Sports
- Studio Universal
- tvN Asia
- tvN Movies Pinoy

==== Former channels ====
- EDGEsport Philippines
- TAP Sports 1
- TAP Sports 2
- TAP W
- Blast Sports
- UFC TV

=== TAP Go ===
TAP Go was TAP DMV's official over-the-top (OTT) app and browser-based subscription service which allows users to stream Live TV Channels and Video On Demand content over the internet. It contained livestreaming of the company's cable channels and selected live sporting events, restricted to Philippine territory only. In November 2020, TAP Go suspended its operations indefinitely to give way for system maintenance, although its sister site (PremierFootball.ph) continues to operate. The service was resumed on August 14, 2021. The service was relaunched in October 2022 with additional live TV channels from third-party content providers like Warner Bros. Discovery Asia-Pacific, Paramount Networks EMEAA, Rock Entertainment Holdings, and ABS-CBN. In addition, TAP Go has also offers in-house FAST/linear channels through a partnership with Endeavor Streaming, namely: Laff, Crime TV, Comic U, and Game Show Central.

The service was discontinued on November 3, 2023 when TAP Go merged its content into BlastTV.

=== Blast TV ===
Blast TV is a over-the-top (OTT) service in partnership with Converge ICT Solutions Inc. which provided shows and channels with content from NBCUniversal, Paramount Pictures, Sony Pictures, MGM Television, Lionsgate, and CJ ENM. The service offers TV channels of different genres as well as online Video On Demand and catch up content. The service is also the exclusive home of Studio Universal in the Philippines, which operates both as a linear channel and a VOD content library from NBCUniversal.

The service is available for subscription and is included at no extra cost for Converge FiberX subscribers (including Surf2Sawa and Bida Fiber plans) as well as for Globe At Home broadband subscribers (both Prepaid and Postpaid).
