= DZBC-DTV =

- Metro Manila; Philippines
- Channels: Digital: 30 (UHF; ISDB-T); Virtual: 30.01

Programming
- Subchannels: See list
- Affiliations: 30.1: SolarFlix (mirror feed); 30.2: Solar Sports; 30.3: Solar Learning (DepEd TV)

Ownership
- Owner: Byers Communications
- Operator: Solar Entertainment Corporation (under channel lease arrangement)

History
- First air date: 1992 (DWBC-TV); 2018 (DZBC-DTV)
- Former call signs: DWBC-TV (1992–1993)
- Former channel number: Analog: 68 (1992–1993)
- Call sign meaning: Byers Communications

Technical information
- Power: 1 kW

DZBC-DTV (digital channel 30) is a television station in Metro Manila. It is owned by Byers Communications and operated by Solar Entertainment Corporation under a subchannel lease agreement. Its transmitter is located in Antipolo, Rizal.

The station is inactive as of January 2022, and after 3 years, returning on air on April 3, 2025 with a short hours.

== History ==
Prior to its resurface, Byers was assigned on UHF 68 by the National Telecommunications Commission (NTC). In 1992, Byers launched Intervision on Channel 68 as a UHF pay television service. A year later, however, ceased its operations due to an intense competition with cable operators, particularly Sky Cable.

In 2018, the NTC granted Byers Communications a television license assigned on UHF 30 for pay television purposes. Solar Entertainment and Byers signed an agreement wherein Solar will operate multiple subchannels on UHF 30 via digital terrestrial transmission.

In 2018, Solar launched its commercial freemium digital TV service Easy TV. The service, however, ceased its operations on September 30, 2019.

As of August 2020, this station currently carries the Solar Learning channel, which rebroadcasts a live feed from the Department of Education's DepEd TV programming service.

== Digital channels ==
UHF Channel 30 (569.143 MHz)

Channel	Video	Aspect	Short name	Programming	Note
30.1	480i	16:9	SolarFlix	SolarFlix (mirror feed from DTT 21)	Test Broadcast
30.2	480i	16:9	Solar Sports	Solar Sports	Test Broadcast
30.3	480i	16:9	DepEd TV	Solar Learning (relay from DepEd TV)	Test Broadcast

== See also ==
- DWCP-DTV
