= DepEd TV =

Educational UHF TV channel in the Philippines

- Network: GMA Network (until June 30, 2022); IBC (until June 4, 2022); BEAM (until June 29, 2022); Solar Learning; ABS-CBN (through Knowledge Channel); Various regional free-to-air UHF TV networks
- Launched: August 11, 2020; 6 years ago (test broadcast); October 5, 2020; 6 years ago (official launch); December 8, 2025; 10 months ago (relaunch)
- Closed: June 30, 2022; 4 years ago (original)
- Country of origin: Philippines
- Owner: Government of the Philippines (Department of Education)
- Format: Education
- Running time: 12 hours/720 minutes (7:00 am to 7:00 pm); Monday to Saturday (1st incarnation); 16 hours/960 minutes (8:00 am to 12:00 mn); Monday to Sunday (2nd incarnation)

Availability

Terrestrial
- Available on most regional TV stations in the Philippines: Check local listings for channel assignments
- GMA Affordabox: Channel 7 (until June 30, 2022)
- BEAM TV: Analog: Broadcast Enterprises and Affiliated Media; DTTV: x.1 on O&O stations
- Cignal TV (Nationwide): Channel 149
- SatLite (Nationwide): Channel 189

Streaming media
- BEAM TV: Watch Live
- Cignal Play: Watch Live (Philippines only)
- YouTube: DepEd TV (selected programs only)

Department of Education Television (commonly known as DepEd TV and stylized as DepED | TV) is a Philippine educational UHF television channel of the Department of Education (DepEd) with the assistance of the Presidential Communications Operations Office (PCOO). It was launched on August 11, 2020, beginning its test broadcast. Following the postponement of the starting date of classes however, the block was suspended to October 5 of the same year.

== History ==
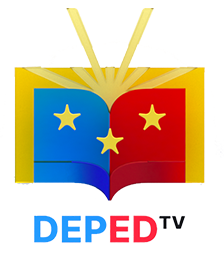
Logo used from 2020 to 2022

DepEd announced the initialization of educational classes through blended learning in the midst of the COVID-19 pandemic in the Philippines. Among many options is to broadcast learning modules on television and radio. The department later tapped state media agency PCOO to assist in producing and airing lessons and modules.

The service held its test broadcasts from August 11 until 21, 2020 via IBC, Solar Learning and various local/regional stations, but was suspended on the following week after DepEd moved the opening date of its regular classes for the 2020–2021 school year to October 5, 2020.

The service held its second and final test broadcasts from September 21 to 25, 2020.

The service on GMA Network Inc. ceased operations on June 30, 2022 during the inauguration of President Bongbong Marcos and in preparation for the return of face-to-face classes. It was replaced with Pinoy Hits in January 2023.

On December 8, 2025, Solar Learning started simulcasting select Knowledge Channel programs. This move stems from a three-party memorandum of agreement among Solar Entertainment Corporation (via its subsidiary Solar Pictures Inc.), the ABS-CBN Corporation unit Knowledge Channel Foundation Inc., and the Department of Education, aiming to revive DepEd TV and help reduce learning loss while strengthening the resilience of education during disruptions.

== Networks ==
Aside from airing on IBC-13 and Solar Learning, DepEd TV also aired its educational programs on other TV channels:

- GMA DTV – 1 terrestrial TV channel
- BEAM TV – 1 terrestrial TV channel
- Cignal – 1 satellite TV channel
- G Sat – 1 satellite TV channel
- Sky Cable in Mega Manila – 1 cable TV channel
- Members of the Philippine Cable and Telecommunications Association (PCTA) – 1 to 3 cable channels for each member
- Planet Cable (Streamtech) (Ilocos Norte) – 1 cable channel
- Gracia Telecommunications (Ilocos Sur) – 1 cable channel
- Various regional UHF television stations in the Philippines
- DZRM 1278 – Radio simulcast
