= TAP Edge =

Philippine pay television channel

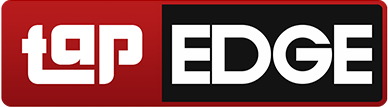
- Country: Philippines
- Broadcast area: Nationwide
- Headquarters: Mandaluyong, Metro Manila

Programming
- Language: English
- Picture format: 480i SDTV

Ownership
- Owner: TAP Digital Media Ventures Corporation
- Sister channels: TAP Action Flix; TAP Movies; TAP Sports; TAP TV; Premier Sports 2; Premier Football; Premier Sports

History
- Launched: February 1, 2018
- Closed: January 1, 2025 (Cignal only)
- Former names: EDGEsport Philippines (2018–2020)

Availability

Terrestrial
- Sky Cable Metro Manila: Channel 218
- SkyTV Metro Manila: Channel 122
- Sky Direct Nationwide: Channel 31
- G Sat Nationwide: Channel 29

Streaming media
- Blast TV: Internet Protocol television (Philippines only; requires monthly subscription)

TAP Edge (stylized as tap EDGE) is a 24-hour Philippine pay television channel owned by TAP Digital Media Ventures Corporation.

The channel airs a variety of entertainment genres focusing on action/suspense and crime dramas.

== History ==
Prior to the launch, TAP DMV signed a joint venture/brand licensing agreement with U.S.-based global media company IMG to carry the EDGEsport programming to the Philippines.

On February 1, 2018, EDGEsport Philippines was officially launched via Sky Cable, and was the first cable channel of TAP DMV. It broadcasts the same format of its international counterpart, offering action/combat sports and adventure/outdoor lifestyle programs.

On February 17, 2020, as part of TAP DMV's restructure on its channels, EDGEsport was relaunched as TAP Edge.

On November 15, 2020, the channel began its transition to reformat as an action/drama-oriented entertainment channel, with EDGEsport and other action sports programming made its final broadcast in December 2020.
