= TAP TV =

Philippine pay television channel

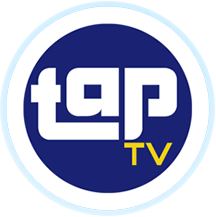
- Country: Philippines
- Broadcast area: Nationwide
- Headquarters: Mandaluyong, Metro Manila

Programming
- Language: English
- Picture format: 1080i HDTV

Ownership
- Owner: TAP Digital Media Ventures Corporation
- Sister channels: TAP Action Flix; TAP Movies; TAP Edge; TAP Sports; Premier Sports 2; Premier Football; Premier Sports

History
- Launched: April 14, 2019
- Closed: January 1, 2026 (Cignal only)
- Former names: TAP Sports 2 (2019–2020); TAP W (2020)

Availability

Terrestrial
- Sky Cable Metro Manila: Channel 215
- SkyTV Metro Manila: Channel 124
- Sky Direct Nationwide: Channel 32
- G Sat Nationwide: Channel 28

Streaming media
- Blast TV: Internet Protocol television (Philippines only; requires monthly subscription)

TAP TV (stylized as tap TV) is a 24-hour Philippine pay television channel owned by TAP Digital Media Ventures Corporation. It is launched on April 14, 2019. A former sports channel, it currently broadcasts as a general entertainment channel since November 4, 2020.

== History ==
On April 14, 2019, TAP DMV launched a secondary channel of TAP Sports, focusing on airing live coverages and highlights of every WTA tournaments. On February 17, 2020, the WTA events (along with its men's counterpart ATP) were moved to a new tennis-dedicated channel Premier Tennis, while TAP Sports 2 was reformatted as TAP W and began shifting its focus on women's sports.

On November 2, 2020, TAP DMV relaunched TAP W as TAP TV, reformatted as a general entertainment channel. The first program aired on TAP TV was The Today Show.
