= PCTV =

PCTV may refer to:

- Communist Party of the Basque Homelands (Partido Comunista de las Tierras Vascas), separatist party in Spain
- PCTV (Penn College), TV station at Penn College, United States
- Philippine Cable Television Association

== See also ==
- , includes many other "P... College/Community TV" names
