= List of programs broadcast by Knowledge Channel =

ABS-CBN Programs by Lopez Family

This is a list of programs broadcast by Knowledge Channel, a digital free-to-air and cable channel owned by ABS-CBN.

== Current programming ==
=== Original programming ===
- Agham Aralin (2010) – Science
- Agos (2013) – Health
- AgriCOOLture (2015) – Technology and Livelihood Education
- Art Smart (2019) – Arts
- Art Smart With Teacher Precious (2022) – English
- Basic Geography (1989) – Araling Panlipunan
- Bayan E-skwela (2022) – Parent-Teacher Activity Time
- Carlos' Blog (2013) – English
- Census of Population (2016) – Araling Panlipunan
- Disaster Preparedness (2020) – General Information
- Dok Ricky, Pedia (2014) – Health
- Dokyu-Mento (2025) – Alternative Learning System
- Eco Squad (2022)
- Ekonomiks (2013) – Araling Panlipunan
- Estudyantipid (2007) – Araling Panlipunan
- Faculty Room (2010) – Teacher's Program
- From Lines to Life (2012) – Tagalog
- Gab To Go (2010) – English
- Gen H: Generation Healthy (2025) – Science
- Generation Math (2000) – Mathematics
- Ibang Klase (2011) – Alternative Learning System
- K-High (2010) – Mathematics and Science
- K-High: Math Matters (2014) – Mathematics
- K-High Science (2013) – Science
- K-Hub (2011) – Science
- Kada Tropa (2011) – Alternative Learning System
- Kasaysayan TV (2001) – Araling Panlipunan
- Khan Academy (2023) – Mathematics
- Knowledge Factory (2019) – General Information
- Knowledge on the Go (2017) – General Information
- Kuwentong Kartero (2012) – Health
- Kuwentong Pambata (2013) – Tagalog
- Kwentoons (2015) – Cartoons and Mathematics
- Lakbay Aral (2024) – Araling Panlipunan
- Lahi PH (2022) – English
- MathDali (2016) – Mathematics
- Musikantahan (2022) – Music
- Negosyo Ko, Asenso Ko (2007) – Alternative Learning System
- Numberbender (2022) – Mathematics
- Pamana (2001) – Araling Panlipunan
- Pamilyang Masigasig (2013) – Technology and Livelihood Education
- Payong K-Lusugan (2016) – Health
- Puno ng Buhay (2012) – Science
- Ready, Set, Read! (2020) – English
- Science Says (2019) – Science
- Scribbr (2022) – English, Tagalog, and Mathematics
- Ser Ian's Class (2022) – Araling Panlipunan
- Teacher Celine (2022) – Mathematics
- Team Lyqa (2022) – English and Tagalog
- Travel Around The World (2010) – Araling Panlipunan
- Weather Wizards (2018) – Science
- Wikaharian (2019) – Tagalog
- World History (2022) – Araling Panlipunan
- Wow! (2011) – Araling Panlipunan

=== ABS-CBN/ETV ===
- ATBP: Awit, Titik at Bilang na Pambata (1999) – Tagalog
- Epol/Apple (1999) – English
- Math-Tinik (1999) – Mathematics
- Salam (2007) – Araling Panlipunan
- Sine'skwela (1999) – Science

== Acquired programming ==
=== PTV (Constel, 1995–1999) ===
- Chemistry in Action – Science
- Constel English – English
- Constel Literature – English
- Physics in Everyday Life – Science
- Science Made Easy – Science

=== NBN/RPN (Eskwela ng Bayan, 2002–2003) ===
- Alikabuk (2002) – Tagalog
- Karen's World (2002) – English
- Solved (2002) – Math
- Why? (2002) – Science

=== Others ===
- Agri Tayo Dito (aired on ABS-CBN Davao from 2012 to 2018) – Home Economics, Livelihood Education, News, and Travel
- Kumikitang Kabuhayan (2008) – News, Home Economics, and Livelihood Education
- Pop Babies (2020)

== Former programming ==
=== Original programming ===
- 1001 Nights (2021)
- Animahenasyon (2010–2022) – Movies
- MathDali Live (2024) – Math
- Mi Isla (2010) – Science
- Noli Me Tangere (2022)
- O Shopping (2016–2018) – Home TV Shopping, during off-air
- Oyayi (2018)
- Sesame Street (aired on ABC (now TV5) from 1970 to 1972, IBC from 1972 to 1975 and from 1986 to 1989, RPN (now RPTV) from 1975 to 1981, City2/BBC (now Kapamilya Channel) from 1981 to 1986, GMA from 1992 to 2003, 9TV (now RPTV) from 2014 to 2015 and Yey! from 2015 to 2017) – English
- Siklo ng Enerhiya (2025) – Science
- TalkED (2023) – PTA
- Tipong Pinoy (aired on GMA from 1998 to 1999, Studio 23 from 2003 to 2004 and IBC from 2010 to 2015)
- Travel Time (2010)

=== ABS-CBN/ETV ===
- Art Jam (2006) – Arts
- Basta Sports (2007) – Physical Education, and Sports Activities
- Bayani (1999) – Araling Panlipunan
- Busog Lusog (2008) – Health
- Hiraya Manawari (1999) – Edukasyon sa Pagpapakatao
- I Got It! (2011) – General Information
- Kulilits (2011) – General Information
- Pahina (2001) – Tagalog
- Sining sa Lipunan (2004) – Arts
- Why Not? (2011) – Health

=== Others ===
- ArtRepublik TV (2011) – Arts
- Lakbay TV (2008) – Araling Panlipunan, travel
- Local Legends (2019) – News, and Araling Panlipunan
- Mang Lalakbay (2022) - Home Economics, Livelihood Education, and Travel
- Matanglawin (aired on ABS-CBN, Jeepney TV and DZMM TeleRadyo, 2011) - News, Science, Technology, and Health
- Mukha (aired on ANC) – News, Home Economics, and Livelihood Education
- My Puhunan (aired on ANC, ABS-CBN and DZMM TeleRadyo and revived through Kapamilya Channel and A2Z since 2023, 2016) – News, Home Economics, and Livelihood Education
- #NoFilter (2019) – Edukasyon sa Pagpapakatao
