= Sharks Billiards Association =

Professional nine-ball billiards league

- Most recent season or competition: 2025–26 SBA season
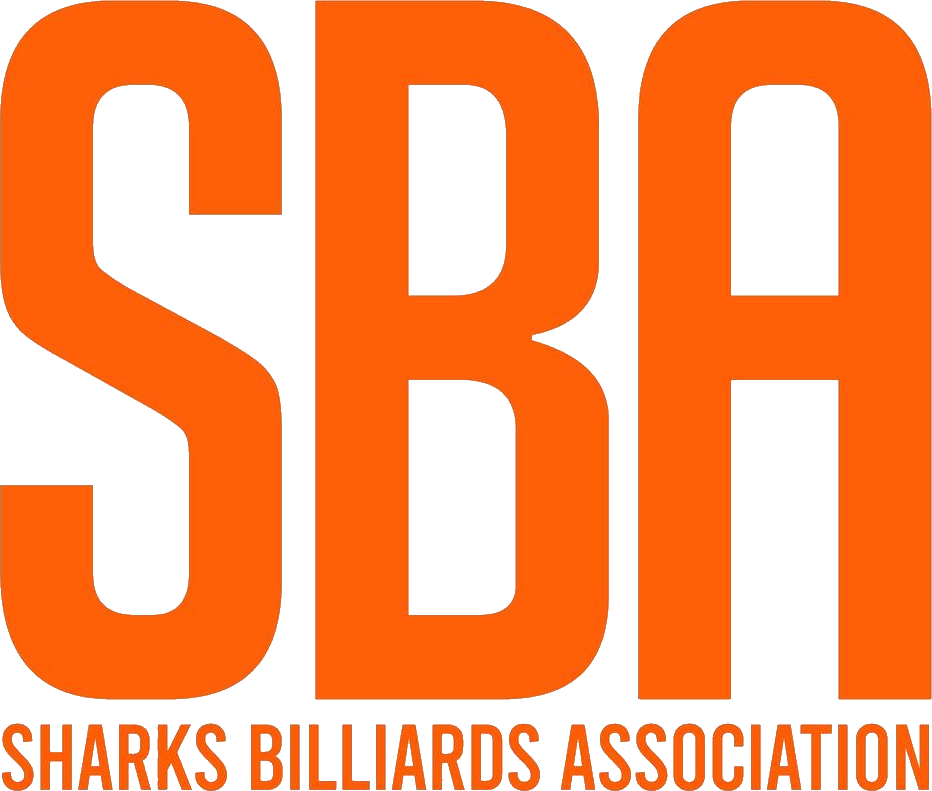
- Sport: Nine-ball
- Founded: May 6, 2024; 2 years ago
- First season: 2024
- COO: Hadley Mariano
- Commissioner: Hadley Mariano
- No. of teams: 6
- Country: Philippines
- Headquarters: Tomas Morato Avenue, Quezon City
- Most recent champions: Taguig Stallions (1st title)
- Most titles: Taguig Stallions (1 title)
- Broadcasters: PTV; RPTV; One Sports; One Sports+ TAP Sports

The Sharks Billiards Association (SBA) is a professional nine-ball league in the Philippines consisting of six teams.

The league's games are played at Sharks Arena, an indoor venue located at Tomas Morato Avenue in Quezon City.

== History ==
=== As the Sharks Billiard League ===
The Sharks Billiards Association was originally established in Quezon City as the Sharks Billiards League (SBL) by Hadley Mariano in partnership with the Billiards Managers and Players Association of the Philippines (BMPAP). It was founded in November 2022 by billiards promoter Perry Mariano and sports patrons Putch Puyat, Isaac Belmonte and Jonathan Sy of BMPAP, and new officials Mon Aguirre, Larry Lim, Hadley Mariano, Jojo Sanchez, and Eric Salud.

With United Kingdom-based Matchroom, the SBL organized the 2023 Sharks International Open at the Great White Arena in Quezon City. It was won by Taiwanese player Ko Ping-chung.

=== Foundation of a professional league ===
On May 6, 2024, the league was renamed the Sharks Billiards Association (SBA). It also now accredited by the Games and Amusements Board. Sports columnist Chino Trinidad was the league's inaugural commissioner until his death on July 13, 2024.

On August 18, 2024, the league had its inaugural draft at Gateway Mall in Quezon City. Jericho Bañares was selected by the Quezon City Dragons with the first pick. The inaugural champions are the Taguig Stallions who won three of their five games against Manila MSW Mavericks in the finals series.

In April 2025, the SBA secured a partnership with People's Television Network as they launch the 2025 Philippine Open.

The 2025 draft is scheduled to take place on July 29, 2025 and the second season proper in September 2025.

== Teams ==
Team	Locality	Joined
Makati Titans	Makati	2025
Manila MSW Mavericks	Manila	2024
Negros Occidental Pillars	Negros Occidental	2024
Parañaque Kings	Parañaque	2025
Quezon City Dragons	Quezon City	2024
Taguig Stallions	Taguig	2024

== Format ==
=== Regular season ===
Game structure

Similar format to the Mosconi Cup, each game consists of five nine-ball matches spread across a five-day period, each with a different format.

- King of the Hill (5v5) – Each team will nominate one player to begin the match. Once a rack is completed, the losing team will send another player for the next rack. Once all five players have played, referred to as a "cycle", all players can be nominated to play again. The first team to score 15 racks wins and earns five points.
- Doubles (2v2) – Each team will nominate two players to begin the match. Once a rack is completed, the losing team will send another two players for the next rack. The first team to score 13 racks wins and earns five points.
- Singles (1v1) – Each team will nominate a player that will play the entire match. The first player to score 13 racks wins and earns three points for his team. Each team is required to send one player to a singles match once during the season before nominating them again.

Sharking

During the games, players may trash talk their opponents, known as "sharking", before the shooter gets in a shooting stance.

Game rules

- After the lag, the losing team nominates first. The winner then selects a player and breaks first.
- A 9-ball is racked on the spot, and the cue ball must placed on center for break.
- A 40-second shot clock applied after the break, then 30-second shot clock after shot.
- Each team gets one 15 second extension per rack.
- Failing to strike a cue ball after the buzzer is considered foul.
- Each team gets two 2-minute timeout per match.
- Jump shots are illegal.

== Championships ==
Main Season
Season		Champion	Score	Runner-up	MVP	Ref.
1	2024	Taguig Stallions	3–2	Manila MSW Mavericks	Rodrigo Geronimo	
2	2025–26	Negros Occidental Pillars	3–1	Manila MSW Mavericks	Drahcir Mauricio	

Philippine Open
Season		Champion	Score	Runner-up	Ref.
1	2025	Anton Raga	13–6	Jerico Bañares	

== Commissioners ==
- Chino Trinidad (May 7, 2024–July 13, 2024)
- Hadley Mariano
