= Subscription television in the Philippines =

Cable television in the Philippines was introduced in 1969 with the first commercial service of Nuvue Cablevision (later absorbed into Sky Cable); Satellite television in the Philippines was introduced in 2001 with the first commercial broadcast of Dream Satellite TV (now defunct); and IPTV and digital over-the-top streaming services in the Philippines was introduced in 2010 with the first commercial broadcast of iWant TV (now iWant), before the arrival of international-based streaming services such as iflix and Netflix.

There are two non-profit organizations that represent the cable television industry, namely: the Federation of International Cable TV and Telecommunications Association of the Philippines (FICTAP), and the Philippine Cable and Telecommunications Association (PCTA).

== Cable television ==
Sky Cable and Cablelink are currently the primary cable operators in the country. There are also local regional companies, such as Air Cable in Pampanga and Rizal, Asian Vision in Zambales, Batangas and Quezon, Royal Cable in Laguna, Planet Cable in Cavite, Fil-Products TV in Visayas, and Parasat Cable TV in Northern Mindanao.

== Satellite television ==
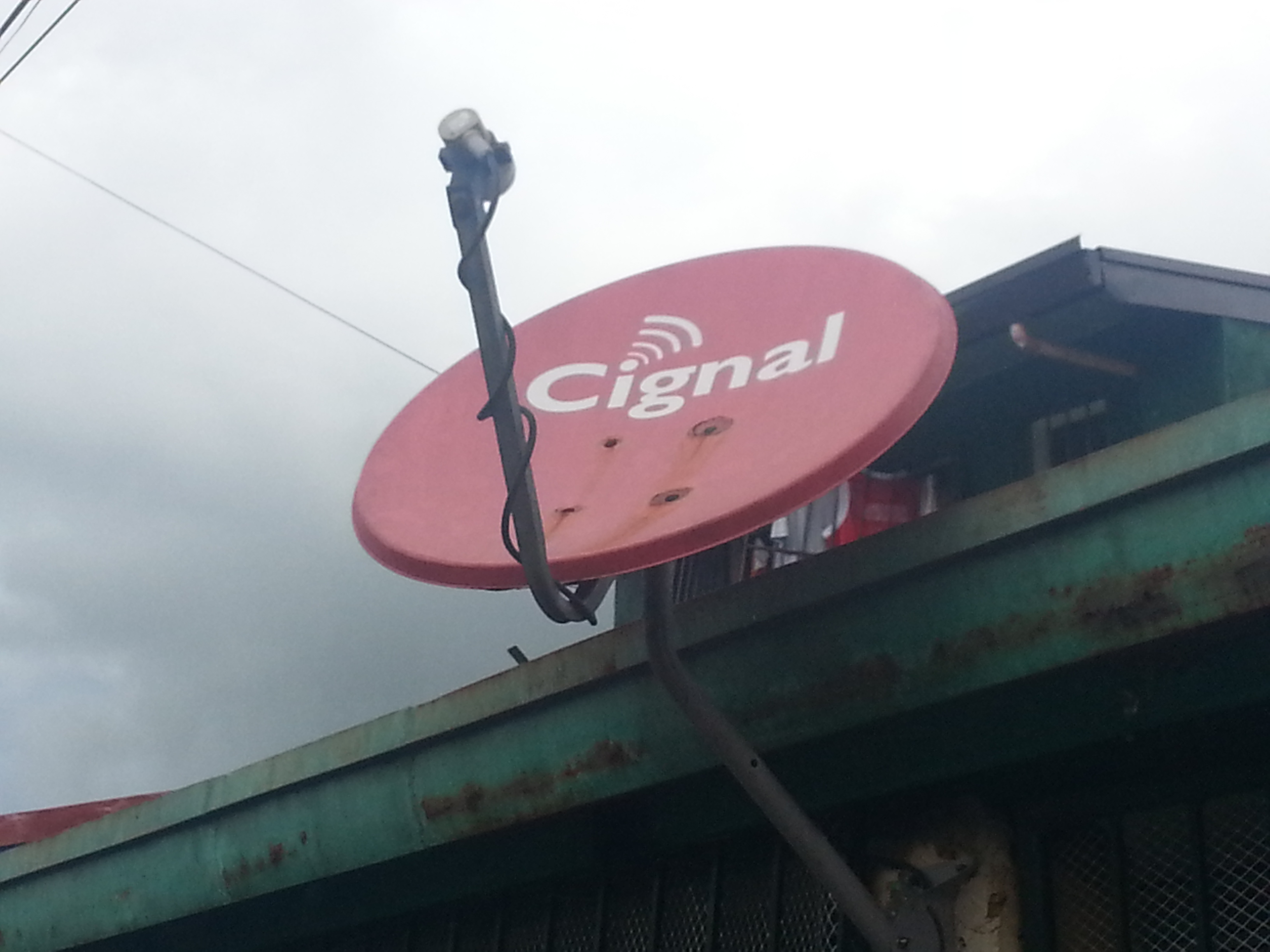
A Cignal satellite dish.

Direct-to-home satellite television is offered through G Sat, Cignal, and SatLite.

Sky Direct offers the service from 2016 to 2020 and again since 2025.

== Internet television ==
With the advent of digital streaming services in 2016, there are active video streaming services available in the Philippines namely:

- Amazon Prime Video
- Apple TV+
- BeIN Sports Connect
- Bilibili
- Blast TV
- Cignal Play
- Crunchyroll
- DAZN
- Dekkoo
- Disney+ (including Hulu)
- Eros Now
- FiliTV
- GagaOOLala
- GMA Play
- Google TV
- Hayu
- HBO Max
- HOOQ (defunct)
- WeTV
- iflix
- iQIYI
- iWant
- Jungo Pinoy
- Lionsgate Play
- Mango TV
- MeWatch
- Netflix
- Pilipinas Live
- Pop TV
- RTM Klik
- Samsung TV Plus
- TVB Anywhere
- Upstream
- Viu
- VMX
- Viva One
- Youku
- YuppTV
- ZEE5

== Pay TV distributors ==
- Asian Cable Communications (ACCION)
- Cable Box Office Shows and Systems Corporation (CableBOSS)
- Omnicontent Management

== See also ==
- Television in the Philippines
- Digital television in the Philippines
