= World Rabies Day =

International awareness campaign about rabies

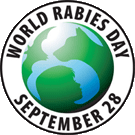
- World Rabies Day logo
- Frequency: Annually on September 28
- Next event: September 28, 2026

World Rabies Day is an international awareness campaign coordinated by the Global Alliance for Rabies Control, a non-profit organization with headquarters in the United States. It is a United Nations Observance and has been endorsed by international human and veterinary health organizations such as the World Health Organization, the Pan American Health Organization, the World Organisation for Animal Health and the US Centers for Disease Control and Prevention.

World Rabies Day takes place each year on September 28, the anniversary of the death of Louis Pasteur who, with the collaboration of his colleagues, developed the first efficacious rabies vaccine. World Rabies Day aims to raise awareness about the impact of rabies on humans and animals, provide information and advice on how to prevent the disease in at-risk communities, and support advocacy for increased efforts in rabies control.

== Background ==
Rabies remains a significant health problem in many countries of the world. Over 99% of all human deaths caused by rabid dog bites happen in the developing world, with 95% of deaths occurring in Africa and Asia. With the exception of Antarctica, people and animals on every continent are at risk of contracting rabies.

One major problem with rabies prevention is a lack of basic life-saving knowledge among people at risk. Organizations working on the issue can often feel isolated, and, as a neglected disease, rabies does not attract sufficient resources, even though the world has the tools and knowledge to prevent rabies and nobody needs to die from this disease.

Health awareness days can help to improve policy on diseases and increase resources to prevent and control them. This understanding led to the development of an awareness day against rabies.

== History ==
The first World Rabies Day campaign took place on 8 September 2007 as a partnership between the Alliance for Rabies Control and the Centers for Disease Control and Prevention, Atlanta, USA, with the co-sponsorship of the World Health Organization, the World Organisation for Animal Health and the Pan American Health Organization [Briggs D, Hanlon CA. World Rabies Day: focusing attention on a neglected disease. Vet Rec. 2007 Sep 1;161(9):288-9.]. In 2009, after three World Rabies Days, the Global Alliance for Rabies Control estimated that rabies prevention and awareness events had taken place in over 100 countries, that nearly 100 million people worldwide had been educated about rabies and that nearly 3 million dogs had been vaccinated during events linked to the campaign.

A 2011 review by a network of international government agencies, academics, NGOs and vaccine manufacturers identified World Rabies Day as a useful tool to assist with rabies prevention, targeting at-risk communities, animal health workers, public health practitioners, governments, key opinion leaders and experts.

In the years following the review, World Rabies Day has also been used by governments and international agencies as a day on which to announce policies, plans and progress on rabies elimination. For example, In 2013, the Food and Agricultural Organization of the UN, the World Health Organization and the World Organisation for Animal Health first called for the global elimination of canine-mediated rabies in a joint statement released on World Rabies Day. It has been included in the Association of Southeast Asian Nations Rabies Elimination Strategy. At the first Pan-African Rabies Control Network meeting in 2015, the 33 African countries represented there recommended consideration of World Rabies Day as an opportunity for rabies advocacy. In the Philippines World Rabies Day has been observed at the national and local government levels since 2007, and is part of its National Rabies Prevention and Control Program.

== Organization and philosophy ==
World Rabies Day was created to be an inclusive day of education, awareness and action to encourage groups from all levels, the international to the local, to increase the spread of rabies prevention messages. Its objectives include raising global awareness about rabies and how to stop the disease, and educating people in rabies-endemic countries to prevent rabies.

It is centralized with an online platform where World Rabies Day events can be registered and resources can be downloaded to support and promote the outreach of educational messages about rabies in person, in print and online. The campaign also aims to bring together all relevant partners in an effort to address rabies prevention and control. Health workers, scientists and personnel in communities at risk of rabies are encouraged to access a bank of awareness resources through the website of the Global Alliance for Rabies Control for use in local educational initiatives.

As rabies is a disease that crosses borders, especially in wild animal populations, the campaign encourages the transnational collaboration of rabies control and prevention organizations. It also promotes a One Health approach to rabies prevention, part of a worldwide strategy for expanding interdisciplinary collaborations and communications in all aspects of health care for humans and animal health. The WRD logo (pictured above) represents the complexity of rabies, which can infect human beings, wildlife and domestic animals.

The advocacy work of the World Rabies Day campaign includes promoting government involvement in rabies prevention and control programs, increasing the vaccination coverage of pets and community dogs, and improving the educational awareness of how to prevent rabies in all levels of society. It also promotes the utilization of an integrated model of disease management, the Blueprint for Rabies Prevention. The Food and Agricultural Organization of the UN considers that World Rabies Day plays an important role in advocating the prevention and control of rabies among policy makers, especially in countries where rabies is still neglected.

== Events ==
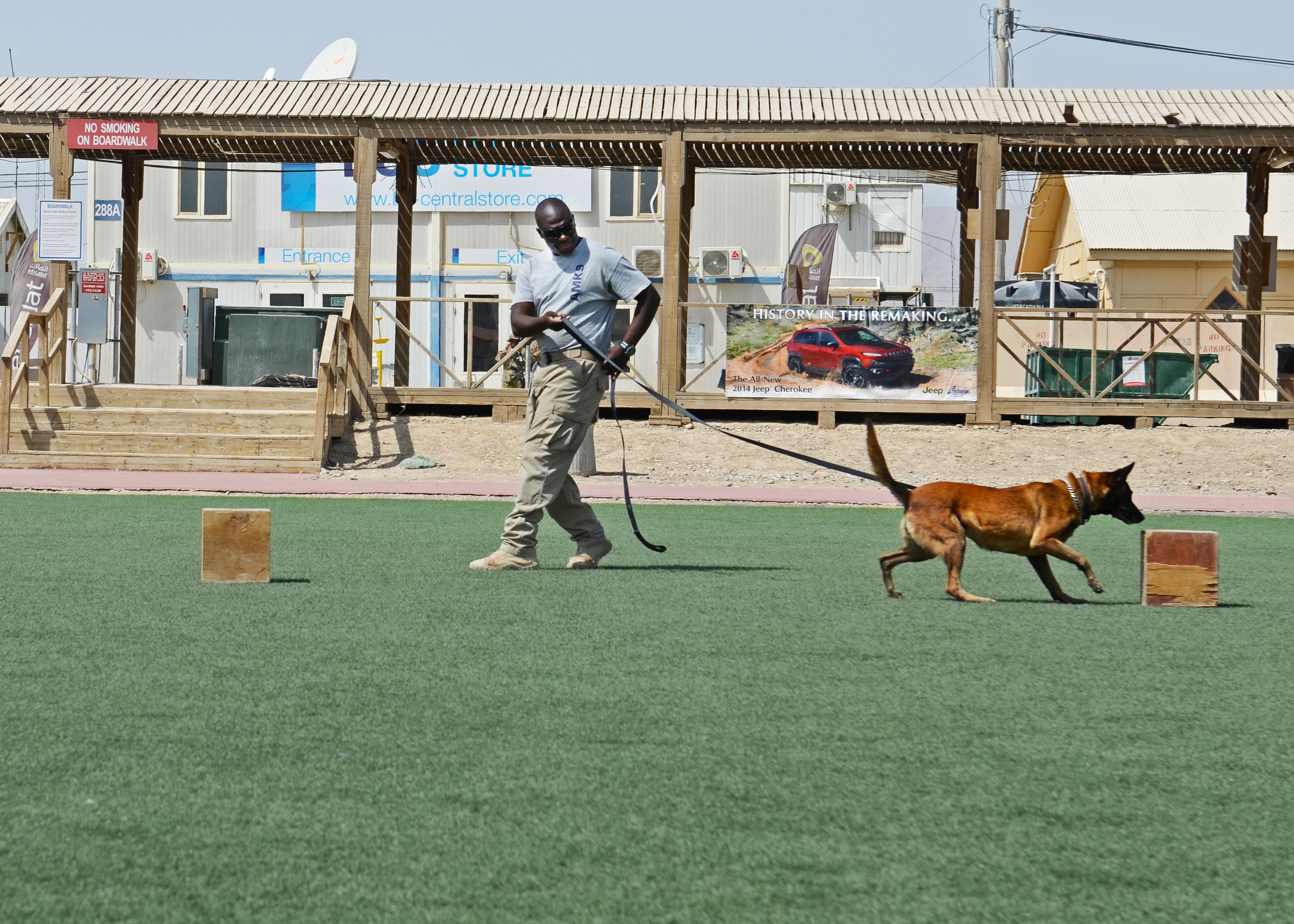
A World Rabies Day event at Kandahar Airfield in Afghanistan

Events held to mark World Rabies Day range from symposia on current rabies control methods and public events for raising awareness about good prevention practice, to sponsored walks, runs or bike rides, to free or externally subsidized vaccination clinics for dogs. In the first ten years, over 1,700 events were registered from different countries, with increases over the years in Africa and Asia, where rabies is still a major issue.

== See also ==
- World AIDS Day
- World Cancer Day
- World Hepatitis Day
- World Tuberculosis Day
