= Global Alliance for Rabies Control =

American non-profit organization

- Founded: 2007
- Type: International non-governmental organization
- Purpose: Rabies prevention and control
- Headquarters: Kansas, US
- Region served: Worldwide
- Key people: Professor Louis Nel
- Website: rabiesalliance.org

The Global Alliance for Rabies Control (GARC) is a non-profit organization that aims to eliminate deaths from canine rabies by 2030. Rabies is a neglected disease of poverty, which is almost 100% fatal, but can also be prevented with available vaccines. The Global Alliance for Rabies Control's work centers around the One Health Approach where vaccinating dogs (the source of up to 99% of rabies exposures to people) stops the disease at its source and protects the whole community. Where the funding and political will exist, canine rabies has been eliminated. Inequality in access to preventive health care and proven control methods means that around 59,000 people, almost all in Africa and Asia, die every year.

The Global Alliance for Rabies Control runs programs to address the main obstacles to eliminating rabies:a lack of coordination of human and veterinary services; low public awareness of the risks; an absence of data; and poor health system capacity. It works with governments; international organizations; veterinary, public health and educational experts; and communities to facilitate policy change and build capacity to eliminate rabies in areas hardest hit by the disease.

== Organization and aims ==
The Global Alliance for Rabies Control was established in 2007 as a 501(c)(3) organization in the US. It works with a sister charity in the UK, the Alliance for Rabies Control, established in 2006.

It is dedicated to eliminating rabies in both humans and animals, in support of the global goal to end deaths due to canine-transmitted rabies by 2030. Its mission is to prevent human rabies deaths, and to relieve the burden of rabies in other animal populations, especially dogs.

The author Alexander McCall Smith is the patron of the organization.

== Activities ==
The Global Alliance for Rabies Control works to unite rabies stakeholders to increase awareness and support for rabies elimination, build in-country capabilities to tackle the disease at the national level, educate at-risk communities to protect themselves and build the evidence base to demonstrate the benefits of eliminating rabies.

=== Networks and partners ===
The Global Alliance for Rabies Control manages an international, multi-partner communications campaign, End Rabies Now, to achieve zero deaths from dog-mediated rabies by 2030 worldwide. Many international organizations, including the World Health Organization (WHO), World Organisation for Animal Health (OIE) and UN Food and Agriculture Organization (FAO), have signed up as partners on this campaign.

In 2008, the Global Alliance for Rabies Control created Partners for Rabies Prevention, a network of rabies experts. Partners include the WHO, OIE, FAO, the US Centers for Disease Control and Prevention (CDC), vaccine manufacturers and NGOs. The Global Alliance for Rabies Control acts as the secretariat for this informal group. The Partners for Rabies Prevention created the Blueprint for Rabies Control, a freely available practical guide used by countries in their national planning.

In 2015, the Global Alliance for Rabies Control established the Pan-African Rabies Control Network, which includes governments from 37 countries. The network unites all sub-Saharan African countries and helps them to develop and implement effective rabies elimination strategies and monitor progress towards elimination. The Global Alliance for Rabies Control supports other networks, such as ASEAN in Asia, with similar capacity building expertise.

=== Building the evidence base ===
The Global Alliance for Rabies Control works with local government partners on demonstration projects in the Philippines on mass dog vaccination, community outreach, education, diagnosis and surveillance. These elements are integrated into national government programs, and the resulting data will inform policy decisions in other countries.

The Global Alliance for Rabies Control and its partners have reassessed the global burden of rabies, and are working on the costs of rabies and the benefits of individual large-scale rabies control programs. The global burden of rabies is now estimated to be 59,000 human lives every year, with annual economic losses of around 8.6 billion US dollars.

=== Educating communities ===
The first World Rabies Day (WRD) was organized by the two founding partners, the Alliance for Rabies Control (ARC) and the Centres for Disease Control and Prevention, Atlanta (CDC), on 8 September 2007 with the co-sponsorship of the World Health Organization (WHO), the World Organisation for Animal Health (OIE) and the Pan American Health Organization (PAHO/AMRO). In 2008, the Global Alliance for Rabies Control changed the date to 28 September, as remembrance for the day of Louis Pasteur's death, for the routine recognition of WRD, an annual global day of awareness on September 28, spreading the message of rabies prevention to millions of people, in over 100 countries. The Global Alliance for Rabies Control offers a series of free online courses through the GARC Education Platform to provide communities and professionals with skills and knowledge to prevent rabies. Up to 60% of all rabies deaths are children. The organization's education projects reach children at school and outside the school system to teach them about rabies and dog bite prevention.

=== Building country capabilities ===
The Global Alliance for Rabies Control, working hand-in-hand with governments, experts and communities, runs in-country training workshops for human and animal health professionals to improve diagnosis, surveillance and awareness. This has included diagnostic training for government laboratories in the Philippines, Zanzibar, Zimbabwe, South Africa, Lesotho and Indonesia, and education workshops for teachers, community health workers, and vet technicians in Lesotho, Zimbabwe, Zanzibar, the Philippines, Haiti and Cambodia.

With its partners, the organization has developed tools such as the Rabies Blueprint and Stepwise Approach towards Rabies Elimination to help countries develop rabies programs and monitor progress towards elimination. The Stepwise Approach was used by the Kenyan government to develop its national rabies elimination strategy, and by all countries in the Pan-African Rabies Control Network to determine their stage of progress and next steps needed to eliminate rabies.

== Awards and nominations ==
The Global Alliance for Rabies Control-supported large scale rabies elimination project on the island of Bohol, Philippines, which resulted in the elimination of canine rabies on the island, was awarded the Galing Pook in 2011 and The Charity Award 2013 for Healthcare and Medical Research.
