= National League for Billiards Sports of the Philippines =

Governing body for cue sports

- Sport: Cue sports
- Jurisdiction: Philippines
- Abbreviation: NLBSPh
- Founded: 2026
- Regional affiliation: Asian Confederation of Billiard Sports
- President: Wharton Chan
- Replaced: Billiard Sports Confederation of the Philippines (1987–2025)

Official website
- nlbs.ph
- (Philippines)

The National League for Billiards Sports of the Philippines (NLBSPh) is the national governing body for cue sports in the Philippines.

== History ==
=== As the BSCP ===
The Billiards and Snookers Congress of the Philippines (BSCP) was established in 1987 following the inclusion of billiards for the 1987 SEA Games in Jakarta. Arturo Ilagan was elected as the BSCP's first president. The organization was recognized by the Philippine Olympic Committee (POC).

In 2016, the POC took over the leadership of BSCP due to the board's failure to have an election of their new officials. POC legal counsel Ramon Malinao will serve as the interim president of the federation until the issues are resolved.

The sports body was suspended on March 10, 2025 by the Asian Confederation of Billiard Sport (ACBS) due to multiple violations including the non-conduct of a general election, with the POC tasked to take over again for three months. The BSCP was expelled by the POC and was dissolved.

=== As the NLBSPh ===
The National League for Billiards Sports of the Philippines (NLBSPh) was formed with Wharton Chan as the inaugural president to replace the BSCP. The NLBSPh first its first general assembly on June 10, 2026 at the Solaire Theater in Pasay.

== Function ==
As the BSCP, the federation sent billiard players in international competitions to represent the Philippines such as the SEA Games and Asian Games.

== Presidents ==
- Arturo Ilagan (1987–?, 2009–2012; disputed from 2012)
- Putch Puyat (2012–2016)
- Ramon Malinao (2016–2020)
- Roberto Mananquil
