= Solar Learning =

Educational television channel in the Philippines

- Network: Southern Broadcasting Network
- Affiliates: DepEd TV (programming feeds); ABS-CBN (Knowledge Channel programming feeds); Byers Communications (DTT frequency; Metro Manila)
- Headquarters: Makati, Metro Manila, Philippines

Programming
- Picture format: 480i 16:9 (SDTV)

Ownership
- Owner: Solar Entertainment Corporation
- Sister channels: SolarFlix; Solar Sports; Shop TV

History
- Launched: August 11, 2020; 6 years ago

Links
- Website: solarlearning.ph

Availability

Terrestrial
- Digital (Mega Manila): Solar Learning 1 (DepEd ALS): Channel 21 (515.143MHz; LCN 21.04)
- Analog (Metro Davao): Solar Learning 1 (DepEd ALS): Channel 7

Solar Learning is a Philippine free-to-air educational UHF television network which broadcasts as a relay feed of the DepEd TV programming service. It is owned by Solar Entertainment Corporation in partnership with the Department of Education (DepEd).

The channel is available via DTT broadcast frequencies in Metro Manila: Channel 21 from 8 AM to 11 PM. It previously broadcast on Channel 30, carrying the Central feed from Monday to Saturday, 7 AM to 7 PM.

== History ==
The channel began its test broadcast in around June 2020. It began simulcasting the dry run broadcast of DepEd TV programming from August 11, 2020, until its suspension the following week, and another dry run broadcast from September 21 to 25, 2020.

On December 8, 2025, Solar Learning started simulcasting select Knowledge Channel programs. This move stems from a three-party memorandum of agreement among Solar Entertainment Corporation (via its subsidiary Solar Pictures Inc.), the ABS-CBN Corporation unit Knowledge Channel Foundation Inc., and the Department of Education, aiming to revive DepEd TV and help reduce learning loss while strengthening the resilience of education during disruptions.
