= Pamana (TV series) =

Philippine educational television show

- Genre: Geography and culture education
- Written by: Maribel Hernaez; Melanie Gardunio
- Directed by: Stephen Sagun
- Theme music composer: Maribel Hernaez; Noel Argosino
- Opening theme: "Pamana Theme Song" by various (Jet Paz, Jiro Manio and Deo Noveno, Ernest Sto. Tomas and Ricky Antenor)
- Composers: Noel Argosino; Froilan Malimban
- Country of origin: Philippines
- Original language: Filipino

Production
- Producer: Rina Lopez-Bautista
- Editors: Dong dela Vega; Ruthcito Domingo; Rommel Malimban; Ike Custado; Elli Jose; Aby Rembulat
- Production company: Sky Foundation

Original release
- Network: Knowledge Channel
- Release: 2001

Pamana (lit. 'Heritage') is a Filipino educational television series developed by the Sky Foundation (now the Knowledge Channel Foundation) and broadcast on Knowledge Channel beginning in 2001. Both this series and Kasaysayan TV were the first original programs to be created by the foundation.

Pamana was developed to engage elementary school students in Philippine geography and culture.

== Cast ==
- Julia Clarete and Jan Marini Alano as Ms. Cruz
- Julia Clarete and Angel Aquino as Diway
- Jet Paz as Niko
- Jiro Manio and Julio Pacheco as Nico
- Deo Noveno and Ricky Antenor as Bobby Buot

=== Guest appearances ===
- Hans Dimayuga as Billy
- Cris Jones as a farmer
- Steve Zamboa as Mang Dan
- Linda Gonzales as Ms. Santos
- Justine Moreno as Emilio Aguinaldo
- Teddy Garcia as a Filipino soldier
- Al Sison as Julian Felipe
- Jeric Bautista as Manuel Quezon
- Michelle Bautista as a moviegoer
- Froilan Sales as a father
- Girlie Alcantara as a mother
- Claudine Alejandro as Ate Arlene
- Timothy Gaspar as Kuya Mark
- Keno Agaro as Kuya Jesse
- Jelly Cruz as Ika

== Production ==
Maria Bernadette L. Abrera, then an associate professor of history at the University of the Philippines, was a consultant for Pamana.

== See also ==
- Knowledge Channel
