= Dream Satellite TV =

Satellite television provider in the Philippines

- Type: Direct-broadcast satellite television
- Country: Philippines
- Founded: April 1997; 29 years ago
- Headquarters: DREAM Broadcast Center, Clark Special Economic Zone, Pampanga, Philippines
- Owner: Philippine Multi-Media System, Inc.
- Key people: Antonio O. Conjuangco, Jr. (Chairman)
- Launch date: April 22, 2001; 25 years ago
- Dissolved: December 31, 2017; 8 years ago
- Former names: Dream Broadcasting System (2001–2003)
- Picture format: DVB, NTSC
- Official website: Archived official website at the Wayback Machine (archived May 17, 2018)
- Replaced by: Sky Direct; SatLite; G Sat; Cignal

Dream Satellite TV was the first all-digital Direct-To-Home (DTH) television broadcasting service via satellite in the Philippines. Broadcasting from the Dream Broadcast Center located at the Clark Special Economic Zone in Pampanga. Content is received from program providers, compressed and broadcast via Koreasat 5 (Mugunghwa 5) in DVB-S and NTSC color format exclusively to its subscribers using the Integrated Receiver-Decoder and the Conax/Nagravision 3 Encryption System.

To receive Dream's broadcasting signals, subscribers must acquire a satellite dish antenna that is 60 centimetres (24 in) in diameter, an Integrated Receiver-Decoder (IRD) and a Dream Conditional Access Card (Smart Card). To provide security and protection, the satellite signals of Dream shall be encrypted using a Conditional Access System. Thus, exclusive use of Dream programs and services will only be available to Dream subscribers.

== History ==
=== 1996-2001: Incorporation and launch ===
In April 1996, Philippine Multi-Media System, Inc. (PMSI) which operated the service, was incorporated. On February 6, 1998, the Philippine Congress passed into law Republic Act No. 8630 which granted PMSI a franchise to construct, install, maintain and operate for commercial purposes and in the public interest, television and radio broadcasting in the Philippines. The franchise term is 25 years. On February 1, 2000, The National Telecommunications Commission (NTC) granted a provisional authority to engage in Direct-To-Home (DTH) satellite services. On February 7, 2001, the PMSI inaugurates its Dream Broadcasting Center at Clark Development Center, and on April 22, 2001, the commercial launch of Dream Broadcasting System, the first DTH system in the Philippines, took place.

In 2003, Dream Broadcasting System was renamed as "Dream Satellite TV".

=== 2006-2011: Koreasat 5 secondary broadcast and Agila II closedown ===
In 2006, Dream began to use Koreasat 5 as an additional main broadcast to the existing Agila II satellite transponder.

Starting 2010 until 2011, Dream closed all of the transponders of Agila II (ABS-5/ABS-3) for its main broadcast, due to the fact that it was only 2 years left in the orbit. When all of the Dream Satellite channels were transferred to Koreasat 5, Dream announced customers to migrate their receivers (which uses Nagravision 3/Conax CAS7) to Koreasat 5 as the replacement for ABS-5/ABS-3 satellite.

In 2011, Antonio "Tonyboy" O. Cojuangco Jr., owner of PMSI, has plans to sell the company. In August 2013, it was revealed that SkyCable was in the advanced stages of negotiations of acquisition of PMSI.

=== 2017: Koreasat 7 third broadcast ===
In 2017, Dream stated that it is planning to sign a multi-year, multi-transponder capacity agreement with Korea-based KT Corporation to broadcast DTH television channels via Koreasat 7 satellite at 116.0 degrees East & upgrade to DVB-S2. Koreasat 7 is expected to be operational by middle of 2017, to complete among 3 DTH operators in the Philippines.

=== The end of Dream Satellite TV ===
On December 31, 2017, Dream Satellite TV ceased their operations after 16 years due to bankruptcy, and stiff competition from Direct-to-Home Satellite TV providers such as Cignal and G Sat. Meanwhile, the Koreasat 7 satellite is currently handled by SatLite, a digital prepaid pay TV service owned by Cignal. It gave out test broadcasts to people who had MP4 Topfield Boxes.

== Hardware ==
=== Receivers ===
Early receivers were made by Nokia (Nokia MediaMaster 8830S/8630S), Digital AllWorld (DAW951 and DAW-SNA4400), ViStar and Crystal. Those receivers were already phased out by Dream (except for DAW-SNA4400 and Crystal), due to the lack of Nagravision 3/Conax support. The later receivers, such as Homecast eM-152USNA, KAON K-270 and the Arion AF-5102S (both of them were still offered by Dream). Both of these receivers are only capable of receiving standard definition broadcasts.

== Smart cards ==
At the time, when the first DVB-version of Nagravision is not yet introduced, Dream Satellite used Conax CAS3 for the main broadcast until they switch to Nagravision 2 and Conax CAS7 encryption on 2006. In 2009, following the Dish Network anti-piracy upgrade, a conditional access swap to the smart card has been completed. This also made the smart card system transitioned to Nagravision Merlin and Conax CAS7.5.

== Status of competition and controversy ==
Dream Satellite TV filed a complaint with the National Telecommunications Commission (NTC) against Global Broadcasting and Multimedia, Inc. (G Sat) for offering a DTH service in the Philippines without a franchise and a license from Philippine authorities, namely the Philippine Congress for a broadcast franchise and the NTC for a Certificate of Public Convenience. Aside from Dream, the Lopez-owned Sky Cable Corporation also filed a similar complaint against GBMI. It argued that GBMI's illegal entry into the industry will result in the unnecessary duplication of an existing service that existing cable TV and DTH-TV service providers already adequately provide.
