= Putch Puyat =

- Born: Aristeo G. Puyat
- Occupations: Sports executive and patron

Aristeo "Putch" G. Puyat is a Filipino sports executive, businessperson, and racehorse owner who was president of the Billiard Sports Confederation of the Philippines.

== Education ==
Puyat attended the University of the Philippines but never obtained a degree having already financial security of his family's business.

== Background ==
=== Cue sports ===
Putch Puyat's family business, Puyat Sports was known for managing bowling centers and billiards halls in the Philippines. His grandfather Gonzalo was an assistant to a Spaniard in Intramuros. When the Spaniards left the Philippines after the Philippine Revolution, a billiards hall was given to the older Puyat. Gonzalo eventually went to manufacturing billiard tables.

Putch Puyat started as a clerk in the family business, then became an assistant to his brother, Jose. The brothers later took over the company and started sponsoring players to compete internationally. They clamored for support from the Philippine government but had to deal with the stigma at the time that the discipline was associated with vices and betting.

Puyat was responsible for billiards popularity in the 1990s and 2000s. He managed the careers of Efren Reyes and Francisco Bustamante. Reyes was already fairly has a reputation in the United States when Puyat started supporting the player.

Puyat also supported the campaign of the cue players for he 2005 SEA Games hosted in the Philippines.

He was elected in July 2012, as the president of the Billiard Sports Confederation of the Philippines. His election was disputed by his predecessor, Arturo Ilagan whose last tenure started in 2009.

=== Horse racing ===
Puyat was chief of the Metropolitan Association of Race Horse Owners (Marho) and also owns horses which take part in races. He was inducted the Philippine Racing Commission's Hall of Fame in 2023.

== Personal life ==
Puyat plays billiards leisurely. His daughter Wendy is a fashion designer.
