= Cignal =

Philippine satellite television and IPTV provider

- Logo used since 2025
- Type: Direct-broadcast satellite television
- Country: Philippines
- Availability: Nationwide
- Headquarters: TV5 Media Center, Reliance cor. Sheridan Sts., Mandaluyong, Metro Manila, Philippines
- Owner: MediaQuest Holdings, Inc. (subsidiary of the PLDT Beneficial Trust Fund)
- Parent: Cignal TV, Inc.
- Launch date: February 1, 2009; 17 years ago
- Picture format: DVB-S2 MPEG-4
- Official website: cignal.tv

Cignal (pronounced as signal) is a Philippine satellite television and IPTV provider, owned by Cignal TV Inc., a wholly owned subsidiary of the MediaQuest Holdings Inc. under the PLDT Beneficial Trust Fund. With over 2 million subscribers, Cignal is the most-subscribed pay television provider in the Philippines.

Cignal's prepaid electronic loading system is powered by Smart Communications Inc. Cignal uses VideoGuard encryption system to protect its content from signal piracy. It uses the SES-7 satellite to provide optimal coverage directly to the target markets.

== History ==
First Cignal Digital TV logo from 2009–2013

Second Cignal logo from 2013–2025

Prior to the launch, the PLDT group had already intended to establish its own satellite television service after its media arm MediaQuest Holdings sold its stake in Beyond Cable Holdings to the Lopez Group, and a failed attempt on the acquisition of Philippine Multimedia Systems, Inc. (PMSI, owner of Dream Satellite TV) from businessman and then-PLDT chairman Antonio "Tonyboy" O. Cojuangco.

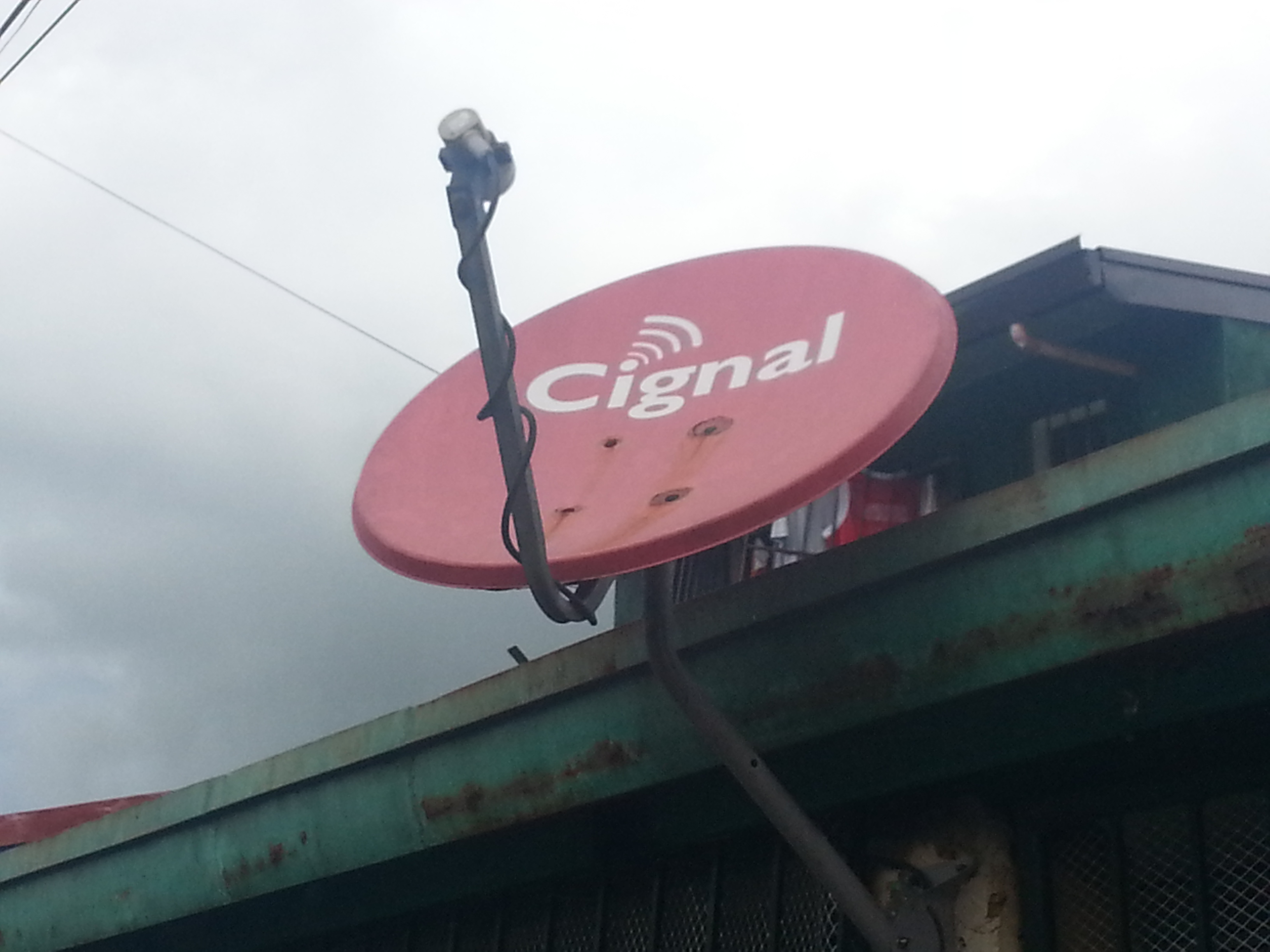
Cignal's satellite dish

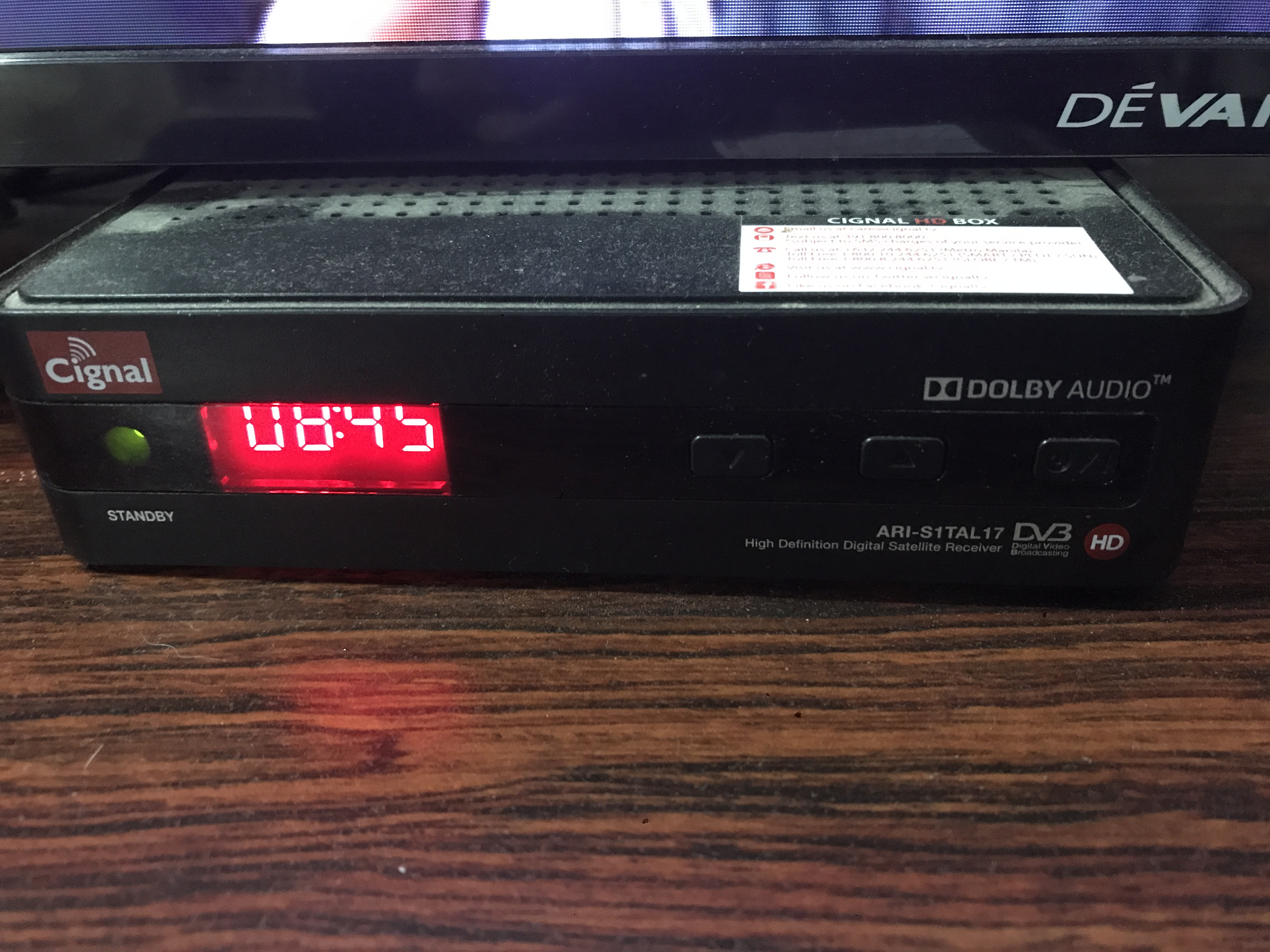
One of Cignal's digital satellite receivers

Using the satellite broadcasting franchise of Mediascape (formerly GV Broadcasting System), the new service was named Cignal and formally began its operations on February 1, 2009. PLDT spent PH₱1 billion for the rollout of the service.

During its first years, Cignal transmitted its broadcast with over 20 SD channels and HD channels via NSS-11 satellite transponder service.

In 2015, Cignal had reached 1 million subscribers. As of November 2021, it had reached a bigger 3.6 million subscribers.

Cignal has officially launched Cignal Super, the country's first streaming aggregator app that lets users access multiple platforms through a single login and subscription. Available on Google Play and the App Store, the app features content from Cignal Play, Pilipinas Live, Max, Viu, Lionsgate Play, and more

== Satellite transponder transmission ==
From 2009, Cignal broadcasts on NSS-11 satellite transponder service. But since 2012, Cignal utilizes additional broadcast on the SES-7 transponder service.

Satellite	Band	Position	Frequency	Polarity	SR	FEC	Encryption	System	Status	Coverage
SES-7	Ku Band	108.2° East	11481, 11656 and 11685 MHz	Horizontal (H)	18750	3/4	Conax / VideoGuard	DVB-S2 MPEG-4	Commercial broadcast	Philippines
SES-7	Ku Band	108.2° East	11510, 11539, 11568 and 11627 MHz	Horizontal (H)	20000	3/4	Conax / VideoGuard	DVB-S2 MPEG-4	Commercial broadcast	Philippines
SES-7	Ku Band	108.2° East	11598 MHz	Horizontal (H)	20000	2/3	Conax / VideoGuard	DVB-S2 MPEG-4	Commercial broadcast	Philippines

== Competition ==
At present, Cignal competes in the DTH service against Global Satellite Technology Services' G Sat, formerly Sky Cable Corporation's Sky Direct was their competitor but was decommissioned on June 30, 2020, via alias cease-and-desist order.

== Sports teams ==
- Cignal Super Spikers (women's volleyball team)
- Cignal Super Spikers (men's volleyball team)
- Cignal-Ateneo (formerly Cignal HD Hawkeyes) (PBA D-League)
- Cignal Ultra (Esports team)

== See also ==
- G Sat
- DirecTV
- Dish Network
