= Sky Direct =

Satellite television provider in the Philippines

- The brand logo of Sky Direct
- Type: Direct-broadcast satellite television
- Country: Philippines
- Headquarters: New Street Building, MacArthur Highway, Balibago, Angeles City, Pampanga
- Owner: Reliance Broadcasting Unlimited; Converge ICT (co-affiliate) (2025–present); ABS-CBN Corporation (2016–2020)
- Parent: Sky Cable Corporation (2016–2020)
- Launch date: March 18, 2016; 10 years ago (first incarnation); February 2025; 1 year ago (second incarnation)
- Dissolved: June 30, 2020; 6 years ago (broadcast franchise lapsed/expired, first incarnation)
- Picture format: DVB-S2 MPEG-4
- Official website: www.skydirect.ph

Sky Direct (stylized as SKYdirect) is a direct-broadcast satellite subscription television service in the Philippines.

From its founding in 2016, it was owned and operated by Sky Cable Corporation, a subsidiary of ABS-CBN Corporation. Sky Cable had been eyeing for a DBS service and considered on acquiring Dream Satellite TV from Antonio O. Cojuangco, Jr. The acquisition of Dream was reported to have reached an advanced stage but for some undisclosed reasons, the deal was not sealed. Sky's entry to the DBS market was hindered by various oppositions from the industry, citing legal issues and the slow growth of the pay TV market in the country. On December 23, 2015, Sky was granted by the NTC a provisional authority to operate and maintain a DBS service in 251 cities and municipalities in the country for a period of 18 months. Sky Direct offered both prepaid and postpaid packages with exclusive channels from ABS-CBN and Creative Programs. As of March 2019, Sky Direct had over 1 million subscribers.

Sky Direct temporarily shut down on June 30, 2020 after an alias cease-and-desist order by the National Telecommunications Commission (NTC). In 2025, the ownership, management and operations of Sky Direct are now under Reliance Broadcasting Unlimited, an affiliate of telecommunications firm Converge ICT under brand license agreement with Sky Cable Corporation.

== History ==
=== Launch and rollout ===
In May 2015, Sky Cable Corporation applied with the National Telecommunications Commission (NTC) for the roll-out of its DBS service with plans of spending at least 252 million pesos for the purchase of equipment (₱122 million) and working capital (₱130 million). On December 23, 2015, Sky Cable was granted a provisional authority by the NTC to operate and maintain a DBS service in 251 cities and municipalities for 18 months. Sky Cable plans to get 49,500 subscribers in the first year of operations and increase it to 864,600 subscribers in 10 years. NTC approved the application of Sky Cable to offer DBS services despite opposition from 14 companies from the cable and television industry.

In January 2016, Sky Direct began the trial period for its prepaid service in three areas through authorized dealers in Metro Manila, province of Cavite and Quezon.

Sky Direct had a soft launching on March 18, 2016, by releasing the television commercial advertisement with endorser Kris Aquino.

The Sky Direct prepaid subscription package includes a satellite dish antenna, set top box (Integrated Receiver-Decoder) and remote control. Sky Direct uses the DVB-S2 digital television broadcast standard in the Ku band to provide standard definition (SD) and high definition (HD) TV broadcasts. For the conditional access, it uses the Verimatrix encryption system to scramble the data and protect its content from signal piracy.

On May 24, 2016, Luxembourg-based satellite owner SES announced a multi-year, multi-transponder capacity agreement with Sky Cable, Sky Direct's parent, to broadcast DTH television channels via the SES-9 and New Skies NSS-11 satellites at 108.2 degrees East. SES-9 is expected to be operational middle of 2016.

=== Temporary closure ===
On June 30, 2020, Sky Direct temporarily stopped operations due to the alias cease-and-desist order (ACDO) issued by the National Telecommunications Commission (NTC) and Solicitor General Jose Calida regarding the expiration of ABS-CBN's legislative franchise.

=== New ownership and management ===
In 2024, Reliance Broadcasting Unlimited began entering its new business venture after the NTC has allowed RBU to operate a direct-to-home (DTH) satellite TV service. In February 2025, RBU began its satellite test transmission using the Sky Direct brand thru its newly-acquired two frequencies on the JCSAT-4B satellite transponder. Prior to the revival, RBU had conducted its test broadcast on Koreasat 7 satellite. It was later confirmed in April 2025 that RBU had acquired Sky Direct's idle DTH satellite broadcast equipment and infrastructure.

Sky Direct is expected to relaunch by 2025 under RBU/Converge ownership and operations. This comes after Sky and Converge forged their memorandum of agreement in July 2024 allowing Converge to utilize Sky's fiber internet infrastructure and other businesses.

== Sky Direct broadcast ==
In December 2015, Sky Direct began its test broadcast using SES NSS-11 satellite. But in May 2016, Sky Direct moved its full broadcast using SES-9 Satellite.

Since its reactivation in February 2025, Sky Direct is currently test broadcasting on JCSAT-4B satellite transponder.

Satellite	Band	Position	Frequency	Polarity	SR	Encryption	System	Status	Coverage
JCSAT-4B	Ku Band	124.0° East	11595 & 11625 MHz	Vertical (V)	22415	StreamGuard	DVB-S2 MPEG-4	Test broadcast	Philippines

== Competition ==
Sky Direct competes with Cignal, the leading DTH provider with more than two million subscribers owned by the Philippine Long Distance Telephone Company (PLDT) through MediaQuest Holdings, and with G Sat owned by Global Satellite Technology Services.

== Opposition ==
The entry of Sky Direct in the DTH service was being opposed by various groups citing violation of the anti-monopoly law, including Cignal and its sister company TV5 Network under the PLDT group, Dream Satellite TV, and the Philippine Cable Television Association. In a filing with the NTC, PMSI said the DTH players in the Philippines are expected to continue incur losses due to tougher competition with the entry of Sky Cable. From 2009 to 2013, Cignal TV incurred an accumulated deficit of 5 billion pesos, Dream with 1.1 billion pesos, and GSat with 173 million pesos.

In February 2016, TV5 Network, Inc formally filed a motion for reconsideration with the NTC asking the regulator to dismiss Sky Cable's application to offer DBS and reverse its order from December 2015 that allowed Sky Cable to offer both wired and wireless cable network services nationwide. TV5 argued that DBS or wireless cable service is beyond the scope of Sky Cable’s franchise and articles of incorporation. According to TV5, Sky Cable's amended articles of incorporation states that it can establish and operate a cable television which is wired in nature and not a wireless service like DBS. The regulator emphasized in its December 2015 order that DBS service is within the scope of Sky Cable's congressional franchise.

On June 29, during the joint hearing by the House Franchises and Good Government committee, regarding on their operations of ABS-CBN TV Plus, Sky Direct and its blocktime deal with AMCARA Broadcasting Network, the Federation of International Cable TV and Telecommunications Association of the Philippines (FICTAP), National Chairperson Estrellita Juliano Tamano has urged the NTC to stop their operations, because of their expired franchise. After that, Telecommunications Commissioner Gamaliel Cordoba announced that Sky Direct will cease operations, despite their objections made by Rodante Marcoleta, which he asked him to resign as commissioner and Boying Remulla's threat to face graft charges before the Ombudsman against him.

== See also ==
- Sky Cable
- Sky Cable Corporation
