= List of assets owned by PLDT =

Things owned by the Philippine telecom firm

This is the list of assets owned by PLDT. The following are wholly owned by PLDT unless otherwise indicated.

== Wireless ==
- Smart Communications
  - Smart Broadband Inc.
  - Primeworld Digital Systems, Inc.
  - Wolfpac Mobile, Inc.
  - Wireless Card Inc.
  - Smart Money Holdings Corporation (SMHC)
    - Smart Money, Inc. (owned through SMHC)
  - Far East Capital Limited
  - Philippines Communications Holdings Corporation
  - Francom Holdings, Inc.
    - Connectivity Unlimited Resource Enterprise, Inc.
  - Chikka Holdings Limited
    - Chikka Communications Consulting (Beijing) Co. Ltd.
    - Chikka Pte. Ltd.
  - Smarthub Pte. Ltd.
    - Takatack Pte. Ltd.
    - 3rd Brand Pte. Ltd.
    - Voyager Innovations, Inc.
- Telesat, Inc.
- ACeS Philippines Satellite Corporation
- Mabuhay Investment Corporation

== Fixed Line ==
- PLDT Clark Telecom, Inc.
- PLDT Subic Telecom, Inc.
- PLDT Global Corporation
  - PLDT HK Ltd.
  - PLDT SG Pte. Ltd.
  - PLDT Malaysia Sdn. Bhd.
  - PLDT US
  - PLDT UK Ltd.
  - PLDT Italy S.r.l,
  - PLDT Japan Ltd.
  - PLDT Korea Ltd.
  - PLDT China Ltd.
- PLDT-Philcom, Inc.
- ePLDT, Inc.
  - IP Converge Data Services, Inc.
  - Curo Teknika, Inc.
  - ABM Global Solutions, Inc.
  - ePDS, Inc.
  - netGames, Inc.
- Digitel Telecommunications Philippines, Inc. (99.6%) (as of 31 December, 2024)

  - Digitel Mobile Philippines, Inc. (Sun Cellular)
  - Digitel Capital Philippines Ltd.
  - Digitel Information Technology Services, Inc.
  - Asia Netcom Philippines Corporation (60%)
  - Digital Crossing, Inc. (40%)
- PLDT-Maretel, Inc.
- Bonifacio Communications Corporation
- Radius Telecoms, Inc.

== Investments ==
- PLDT Global Investments Holdings, Inc.
  - SPi Global Investments, Inc. (20%)
  - Infocom Technologies, Inc. (20%)
- PLDT Global Investments Corporation
  - Rocket Internet AG (8.6%)
- PLDT Communication and Energy Ventures
  - Beacon Electric Asset Holdings, Inc (Meralco).
- Multisys Technologies Corporation (45.73%)
- Vega Telecom Inc. (50%)

== Mass media ==
- MediaQuest Holdings, Inc.
  - TV5 Network, Inc.
    - TV5
    - RPTV (joint partnership with Radio Philippines Network, Nine Media Corporation and ALC Group of Companies)
  - Nation Broadcasting Corporation
    - One Sports
    - True FM
  - Mediascape / Cignal TV, Inc.
    - Cignal
    - Cignal Play
    - SatLite
    - Colours (closure)
    - Sari-Sari Channel (joint partnership with Viva Entertainment)
    - One Screen (closure)
    - One PH
    - One News
    - One Sports+
    - PBA Rush (joint partnership with the Philippine Basketball Association)
    - NBA TV Philippines (joint partnership with the National Basketball Association)
    - BuKo (joint partnership with APT Entertainment)
    - UAAP Varsity Channel (joint partnership with the University Athletic Association of the Philippines)
    - Media Pilipinas TV (closure)
    - TVUP
  - Cignal Entertainment
  - Epik Studios
  - MQ Digital
  - Media5 Marketing Corporation
  - MQ Studios
  - Unitel Group (30%)
  - UXS, Inc. (formerly Unitel Productions)
    - Straight Shooters
- MQuest Ventures
  - TVJ Productions (51%)
  - WinQuest Productions
  - MQ Live
  - Star Worx (formerly Talent5 and MQ Artists Agency)
  - Hastings Holdings
    - The Philippine Star (51%)
    - BusinessWorld (70%)
- Pilipinas Global Network, Ltd.
  - Kapatid Channel
  - Aksyon TV International
