= DXYP =

Radio station in Davao City, Philippines

Mango Radio Davao (DXYP)
- Davao City; Philippines
- Broadcast area: Metro Davao and surrounding areas
- Frequency: 102.7 MHz
- Branding: Mango Radio

Programming
- Languages: English, Filipino, Cebuano
- Format: Christian radio

Ownership
- Owner: RT Broadcast Specialists

History
- First air date: 2012 (as One Radio); December 2016 (as Mango Radio)
- Former call signs: Mango Radio: DXUR (2010–2013)
- Former frequencies: Mango Radio: 97.1 MHz (2010–2013)

Technical information
- Licensing authority: NTC
- Power: 10,000 watts
- Repeaters: Zamboanga City: DXKZ 91.5 MHz; DXLL-AM 1044 kHz

Links
- Website: www.mangoradio.net

DXYP (102.7 FM), broadcasting as Mango Radio, is a radio station owned and operated by RT Broadcast Specialists. The station's studio is located beside Honda Motorcycles, Km. 5 Buhangin Rd., Davao City. It operates daily from 5:00 AM to 8:00 PM.

== History ==
The station was launched in 2009 as a daily Christian program in DXUR and its sister stations in Cebu and Zamboanga. In 2010, due to its success, the stations became Mango Radio and carried a christian radio format. In 2013, Viva Live acquired the stations, prompting Mango Radio to migrate its broadcasts to online. In 2015, it returned to terrestrial air via 91.5 in Zamboanga and, the following year, 102.7 in Davao.

This frequency was formerly owned by Multipoint Broadcasting Network and operated by Rizal Memorial Colleges Broadcasting Corporation under the Radyo ni Juan network from 2012 to late 2013.
