= Vispop (disambiguation) =

Vispop may refer to:

== Music ==
=== Genres ===
- Vispop, a Scandinavian music genre
- Visayan pop, a Philippine music genre, also known as "Vispop"

=== Competitions ===
- Visayan Pop Songwriting Campaign, a pop songwriting and music festival in the Philippines, also known as "Vispop"
