= She Died =

Filipino comic series

- She Died Volume 1, art by Enjelicious

Publication information
- Publisher: VIVA-PSICOM Publishing
- Genre: Spiritual, Romance, Supernatural, Comedy
- Publication date: September 2013 - Ongoing
- No. of issues: 3 (Ongoing)
- Main character(s): Eros Magdayo, Eris Jane Trinidad

Creative team
- Written by: HaveYouSeenThisGirL
- Artist(s): Enjelicious (Enjelia Villanueva)

She Died is a Filipino comic series written by Wattpad author HaveYouSeenThisGirl and illustrated by Enjelicious. The original, unedited story was first posted on the online literary site Wattpad. The story was the first one to get its own Filipino manga/comic adaptation.

== Plot ==
After stealing a student's one month of allowance, Eros Magdayo meets a girl named Eris Jane Trinidad, who claims that she is his guardian angel. Disbelieving her, Eros tries hard to get away from her, with no success. Eris tries to convince him further, stating that she is already dead and it is her mission to change Eros' bad ways within a month. She further states that if they are able to complete the mission, Eros will be granted a wish, and Eris will be given the chance to live again. Still not convinced by her, Eros returns to his family's home, a place he rarely visits because of him being an adopted child. Much to his dismay, Eris tries to come to his home, having no place to settle in, with his older step-sister Risa letting her stay inside. While lamenting about Risa's inevitable death due to her illness, he thinks about Eris' claim of being able to grant him a wish, and wanting to wish for his sister to be healed. Thus Eros goes along with Eris to try to finish her mission within a month so that he could be granted his wish while giving Eris a chance to live again.

== Background and publication ==
She Died was written and first posted as an online novel in Wattpad by HaveYouSeenThisGirL, the pseudonym of Denny R., on Feb. 25, 2012 and ended updates 6 months later on August 12, 2012. The online novel consisted of 22 chapters and one epilogue. As of now, reads of the story are over 4 million and has over 80,000 votes. The online novel's contents was removed in 2013 to prevent plagiarism for the publishing of the novel.

PSICOM Publishing, the same publisher of HaveYouSeenThisGirL's Diary ng Panget, had first optioned to stay with the story being a novel, but HaveYouSeenThisGirL also optioned to adapt it into a Filipino manga. It was later approved and Enjelicious was chosen to be as the main illustrator with the assistance of Jeff Nice and Icchan.

The first volume was released at 2013 Manila International Book Fair held on September 11 to 15, 2013. The second volume was released on May 18, 2014, and was a part of PSICOM's big summer release for 2014 which also included titles like Alesana Marie's Never Talk Back to a Gangster and Veronica Garcia's Kidnapped to be Married.

== Characters ==
- Eros Magdayo: The main protagonist and narrator of the series. Eros has been a rebel to his own family ever since he knew he was adopted. Only his step-sisters Risa and Chill are closest to him, especially Risa Magdayo, who at the start of the story is given only a month to live because of her serious illness. When Eris came to his life, he had only one goal, to wish for his step-sister, Risa, to be miraculously healed. It was later revealed that Eris was his past girlfriend before she died.
- Eris Jane Trinidad: The second protagonist of the series. Claiming herself to be an angel, she had a mission to change Eros' bad ways in a month. In the series, it was shown that she is clingy to Eros and calls him "Ero-Ero". Even though she causes discomfort to Eros, she cares for him. It was later revealed that she was Eros' girlfriend before she died.
- Yohanne Garcia: The one that Eris and Eros became friends with by helping him getting close to his old crush "Gazelle."

== Media ==
=== Comic series ===
==== List of volumes ====
No.	Release date	ISBN
1	11 September 2013	—
2	18 May 2014	—
