= Voiceless (series) =

Series of musical drama novels

- Voiceless; Voiceless 2
- Author: HaveYouSeenThisGirL
- Cover artist: Enjelicious
- Country: Philippines
- Language: Filipino, English, Italian
- Genre: Musical, Romance, Comedy, Drama
- Publisher: PSICOM Publishing Inc.
- Published: September 2013
- No. of books: 2

The Voiceless series is a series of musical drama novels by a Wattpad author under the name of HaveYouSeenThisGirL. The original, unedited story was first posted on the online literary site Wattpad. The story was split into two books by PSICOM Publishing Inc.

In May 2014, in a segment at Kapuso Mo, Jessica Soho, it was announced that the series will be getting its own film adaptation. Viva Films acquired the title and currently has no confirmed released date. This is the fourth movie adaptation to be announced of a story first published in Wattpad after Diary ng Panget, She's Dating the Gangster, and Talk Back and You're Dead.

== Origins and publishing history ==
The story was first posted in Wattpad in 2012 under the name of Stop, In the Name of Love but then, the author changed the title to Voiceless. The story earned more than 9 million reads and 115, 000 votes as of May 16, 2014 even though the story was deleted in 2013 to prevent plagiarism for the publishing of the novel.

Voiceless was published by PSICOM Publishing Inc and separated into 2 parts. Both 2 parts was released in September 2013 at the Manila International Book Fair.

In May 2014, the series was announced for a movie adaptation by Viva Films. The author of the series stated that Voiceless movie's rights was bought at the same time when Diary ng Panget's movie rights were bought. As of now, there are no confirmation on when the movie adaptation will be shown in the Philippines.
