= Visayan pop =

Music genre of the Philippines

- Other names: Vispop, Vis-pop, Bisaya pop, Bispop, V-pop, Cebuano pop
- Stylistic origins: Zarzuela; folk music; reggae; rock; pop-rock; pop
- Cultural origins: 20th century, Visayas, Philippines

Other topics
- Pinoy pop; Bisrock; Music of the Philippines; Budots

Visayan pop, better known as Vispop, usually refers to popular music in the Cebuano language. The genre has many listeners in the Visayas and parts of Mindanao in which Cebuano is spoken. It is characterized by simple melodies and lyrics that reflect Visayan culture. A November 2022 study by Mesiona et al. identified the influence of traditional Cebuano literary forms such as the balak (spoken poetry, often used in courtship) upon Vispop songs.

In the early 20th century, the popularity of zarzuelas in Cebu led to the increased production of Cebuano music. Modern Cebuano music flourished until the 1970s to 1980s. From the 1980s to 1990s, Cebuano interest in local music waned. BisRock bands briefly revived Cebuano-language music in the 2000s. In the 2010s, the launch of the Visayan Pop Songwriting Campaign steered modern Cebuano music towards a contemporary pop sound, influenced by reggae and rock. Various Vispop songs written partially in Cebuano and partially in other languages, primarily English and Tagalog, achieved mainstream success in the 2020s.

== Definitions and etymology ==
The term "Vispop" is derived from Visayan pop or Visayan popular music. Lorenzo "Insoy" Niñal, a member of the Visayan Pop Songwriting Campaign committee, said in 2019, "We have different languages in the Visayas. We accept that. We are sensitive to nuances, that's why it is [called] Bisaya, not Cebuano pop." However, various sources still use the term Vispop in reference to popular music written specifically in Cebuano. (Note: Attributed to multiple sources:)

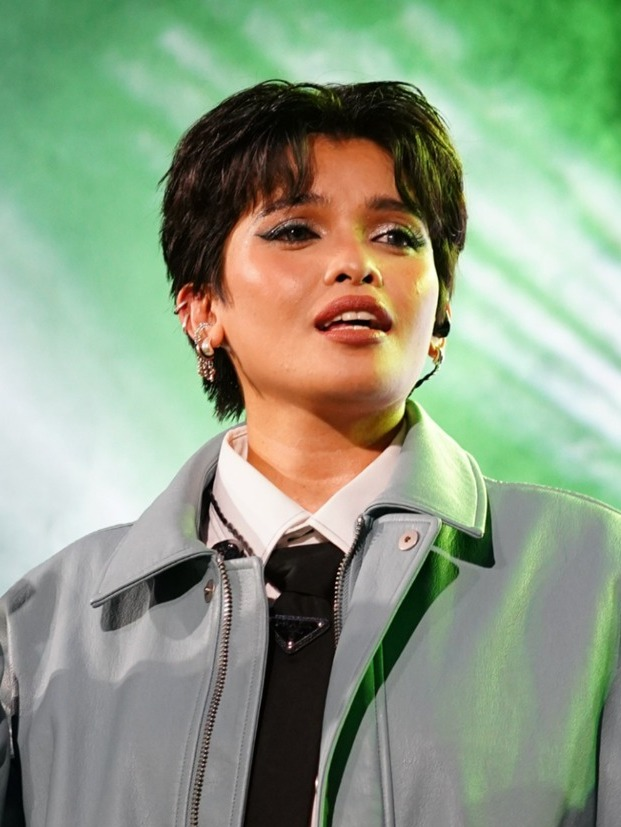
KZ Tandingan (pictured)

Many artists and songs from the Mindanao region are associated with Vispop, due to their use of Cebuano. Examples include the band Oh! Caraga, whose members hail from Caraga, as well as Maris Racal, KZ Tandingan, Alas Alvarez (also a member of Alamat), and J Florence, who are all from Davao. Writing for Nusasonic, (Note: an online magazine dedicated to Southeast Asian music, published by Goethe-Institut) Dominic Zinampan noted that "most" budots songs were written in Cebuano, although the musical style originated in Davao. He explained that its history was "deeply rooted in Bisaya culture". In an article published on February 18, 2025, The Philippine Daily Inquirer's Gabriel Pabico Lalu identified budots as a "Visayan pop dance craze".

In the late 2010s, distinct pop music movements emerged in Iloilo and Mindanao. The former was called Ilonggo Pop and focused on songs written in the Hiligaynon language. The latter, called Mindanao Pop or Minpop, aimed to "hyper-localize" pop songs to Mindanao, although some Minpop songs still feature Cebuano lyrics. Founders of both movements have acknowledged Vispop as their inspiration.

== Characteristics ==
=== Musical styles ===
In an interview with Kara Angan of Billboard Philippines, Boholano singer-songwriter Joseph Gara identified a "distinct Bisaya melody" common to Vispop songs. He said that the melody was simple and did not have many complicated elements. He attributed it to the loose structure of traditional Cebuano songs from which the genre evolved, noting that such songs lacked the rigid song structures of Western music.

Ruben Almendras of The Freeman described Cebuano musicality as "a mixture of Asian, Spanish and Chinese influences". Jude Gitamondoc, the founder of Visayan Pop Songwriting Campaign, told Angan in a separate interview that the contest's vision was to promote "more contemporary trends of pop music" in the Visayas, combining them with genres that previously flourished in the region such as reggae and rock.

=== Lyrical content ===
"Balay ni Mayang"
A 14-second sample of "Balay ni Mayang" (transl. Mayang's House) by Martina San Diego and Kyle Wong. It was an entry to the first Visayan Pop Songwriting Campaign in 2013 and is recognized as a "hit" song. Its lyrics are written in Cebuano, playing out like a conversation between two people.

In an analysis of Vispop artist Therese Villarante-Langit's music, Mesiona et al. linked her songwriting style to Cebuano traditional literary forms such as balak (spoken poetry, often used in courtship) and balitao (love debate between man and woman). They noted that the influence of these literary forms helps Cebuano speakers "celebrate individuality via literature and music". Likewise, a Rappler article by Angan notes that the songs feature the "poetic side" of the language, as opposed to everyday conversational Cebuano. This echoes a sentiment expressed by singer Morissette Amon in the interview, who is quoted as saying, "[Even though] I have been speaking the language, it's really different when it's singing." She described the words in Vispop songs as "laum" (deep).

In a feature about "Day and Night" by Alamat, a song prominently featuring Cebuano lyrics, Acer Batislaong of Nylon Manila wrote that the Cebuano language adds "an extra touch of romance and allure" to music. Elfa et al. identified romance, family, work, and appreciation for one's own city as common themes in Vispop, adding that themes of self-love are also common in songs by women. They explained that the songs use sound symbolism to convey meanings even to individuals who do not understand Cebuano. The study concluded that the genre offers listeners an idea of what topics Visayans find important, reflecting Visayan culture and identity.

"Don't Play"
A 19-second sample of "Don't Play" by Alas of Alamat. It is a Vispop song that was released in February 2025, with lyrics written in a mix of Cebuano, English, and Tagalog.

A study published in December 2023 found that Cebuano lyrics in Vispop songs avoided using noun-forming suffixes, favoring noun-forming prefixes, although both inflectional morphemes exist in Cebuano. Cebuano lyrics in Vispop songs also avoided using adverb-forming affixes and negative affixes, but used verb-forming suffixes. Again, all of these morphemes exist in the language itself. Vispop songs often use a mix of Cebuano and other languages, mainly English and sometimes Tagalog. In 2021, Maris Racal attributed her mixing of Cebuano lyrics with Tagalog to her fear that "not everyone would understand it" if she wrote a song exclusively in Cebuano. On the other hand, singer-songwriter Shoti, who is known for mixing Cebuano and English in his discography, said that he simply wants his songs to stand out from music that is wholly in either language. In an article published on March 19, 2025, Positively Filipino writer Julienne Loreto said that Vispop remained "a great vehicle for Visayan self-expression" despite its use of Western musical styles and English lyrics.

== History ==
=== Introduction of Western music to the Visayans ===
Spanish colonization of the Philippines introduced the Visayans to Western musical traditions. In the 17th century, the Spanish historian Francisco Ignacio Alcina wrote that the Visayans learned to play Spanish musical instruments with "notable skill". Spanish musical instruments such as the Spanish guitar and harp became widely used in the Visayas, supplanting indigenous instruments. The Spaniards influenced the musical styles within the region.

=== 20th century ===
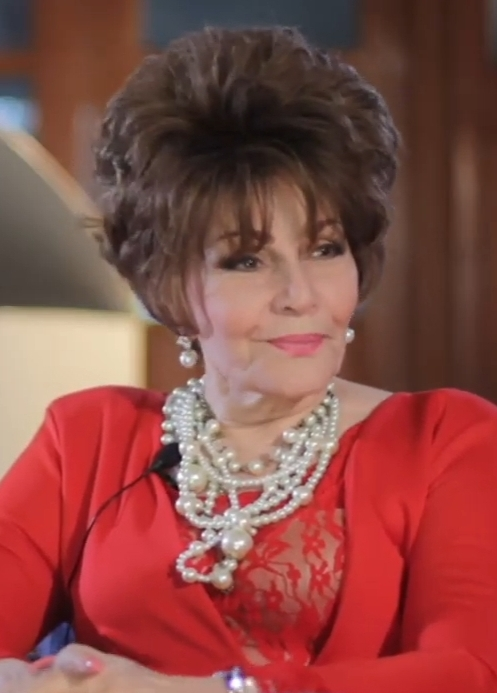
Pilita Corrales (pictured)

Modern Cebuano music first took shape in the 20th century. Its production began to flourish in the early 1900s, owing to the rise of zarzuelas (Spanish-style musical plays) written in Cebuano. In the 1920s to the 1970s, the release of songs such as "Kasadya Ning Taknaa" (transl. Happy is This Hour) in 1933 and "Matud Nila" (transl. They Say) in 1941 further strengthened modern Cebuano music. In 1938, the song "Rosas Pandan" was originally written for one such zarzuela, composed by Domingo "Minggoy" Lopez, with a libretto by Piux Cabajar, (Note: Some sources spell his surname differently; Garcia spells it as "Kabajar", while Oaminal spells it as "Kabahar".) the son of Cebuano revolutionary Justo Cabajar. In the 1970s, Levi Celerio translated "Rosas" into Tagalog, removing the non-lexical vocables "ayay", "ayayay", "tigadong", and "tikadong" from Cabajar's original Cebuano lyrics. In an opinion piece, journalist Ruben Almendras remarked that the song lost its "oomph" and cadence as a result. Pilita Corrales first officially released the song in Tagalog. However, a Cebuano version was later released to honor Corrales' Cebuano heritage. Although the Cebuano version was officially released later than Celerio's Tagalog translation, many people now recognize "Rosas" as a Cebuano or Visayan song.

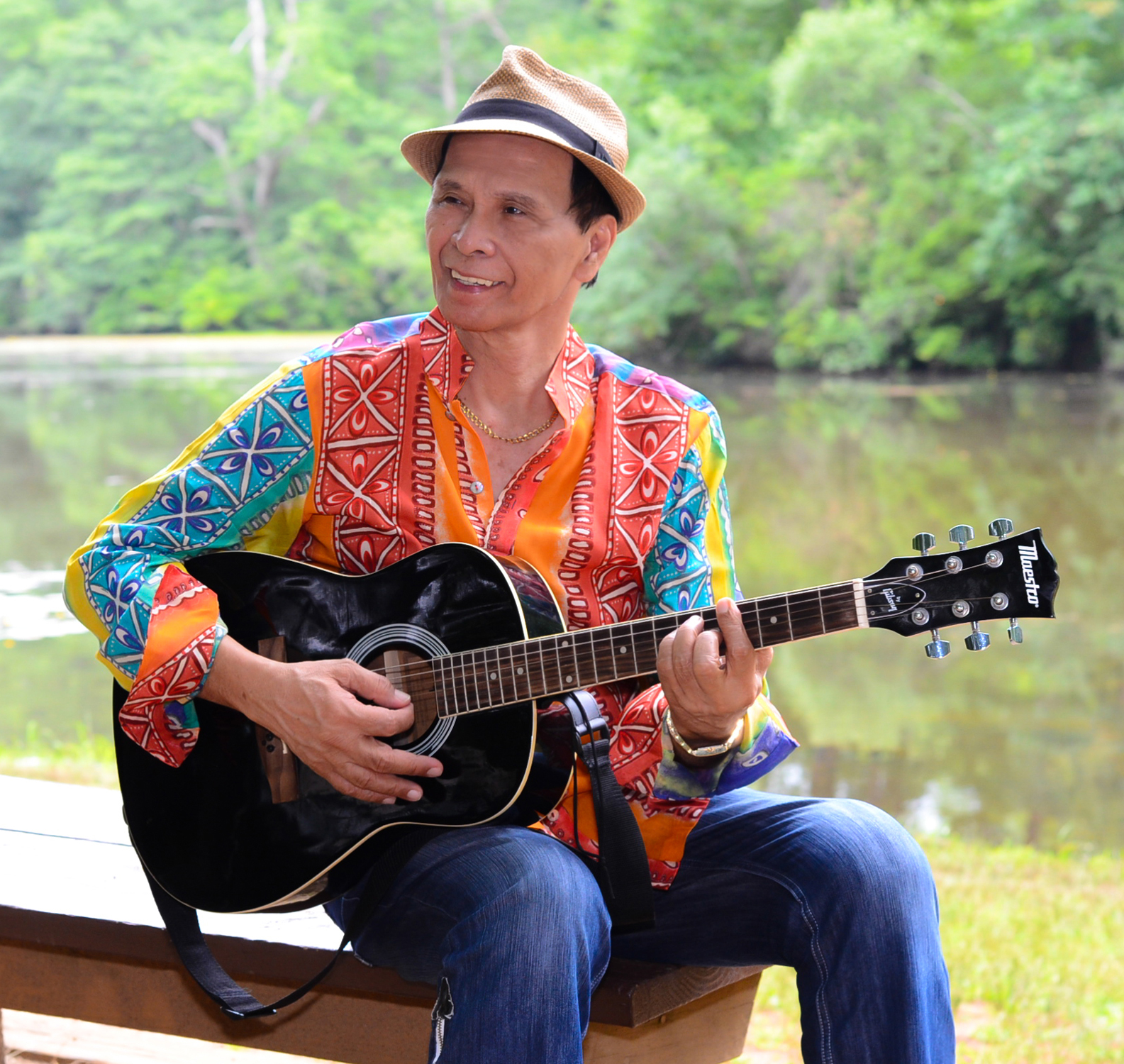
Max Surban (pictured)

Cebuano musicians were highly sought after by Manila-based music labels such as Villar Records. Max Surban, dubbed "the King of Visayan Song", and Yoyoy Villame, who both produced songs in Cebuano, were at the height of their fame in the 1970s. In the same decade, Cebuano musicians Tony Blanco, Cacal Blanco, and Mel Libre made it to the top ten of the First Jingle Magazine Songwriting Contest. According to Libre, a Cebuano rock band called Odds & Ends pre-dated Pinoy rock. In the 1980s, the popularity of MTV, an American musical channel that exclusively played American and non-Cebuano songs, shifted music preferences among Cebuanos. Patronage towards Cebuano music declined. The 1990s saw the formation of Cebuano rock bands Local Ground and Mango Jam. However, they wrote their songs in English, not Cebuano.

=== 2000s to mid-2010s ===
In the early 2000s, BisRock bands who sang in Cebuano grew in popularity. Local radios played their songs frequently, contributing to a brief rise in patronage towards Cebuano-language music. Missing Filemon, a band described by Nile Villa of Rappler as "one of the pillars of the BisRock community", released their debut album in 2003. In 2009, the prolific composer Jude Gitamondoc pitched the idea of the Visayan Pop Songwriting Campaign, a contest for original compositions written in Cebuano, to Ian Zafra, Lorenzo "Insoy" Niñal, and Cattski Espina of Artists and Musicians Marketing Cooperative (Artist Ko), a creative collective based in Cebu. The inaugural contest took place in 2013, in cooperation with the Filipino Society of Composers, Authors and Publishers. In addition to the contest, Artist Ko offered songwriting workshops. In an interview for the event, Espina said, "I was alarmed at the realization that by default, local songwriters write in English." The festival outlined the following objectives:

1. to uplift the Cebuano language
2. to change the widespread mindset of belittling anything in the language, including music
3. to challenge the stereotype that all Cebuano music is strictly either BisRock or comedic novelty songs, and produce more heavily pop-sounding Cebuano music

The festival helped introduce new Vispop talents to the region, including Kurt Fick, Lourdes Maglinte, Mandaue Nights, Jerika Teodorico, Therese Villarante-Langit, (Note: credited as Therese Villarante at the time) and Jacky Chang. These artists were considered as the genre's "new hope".

=== Late 2010s to 2022 ===
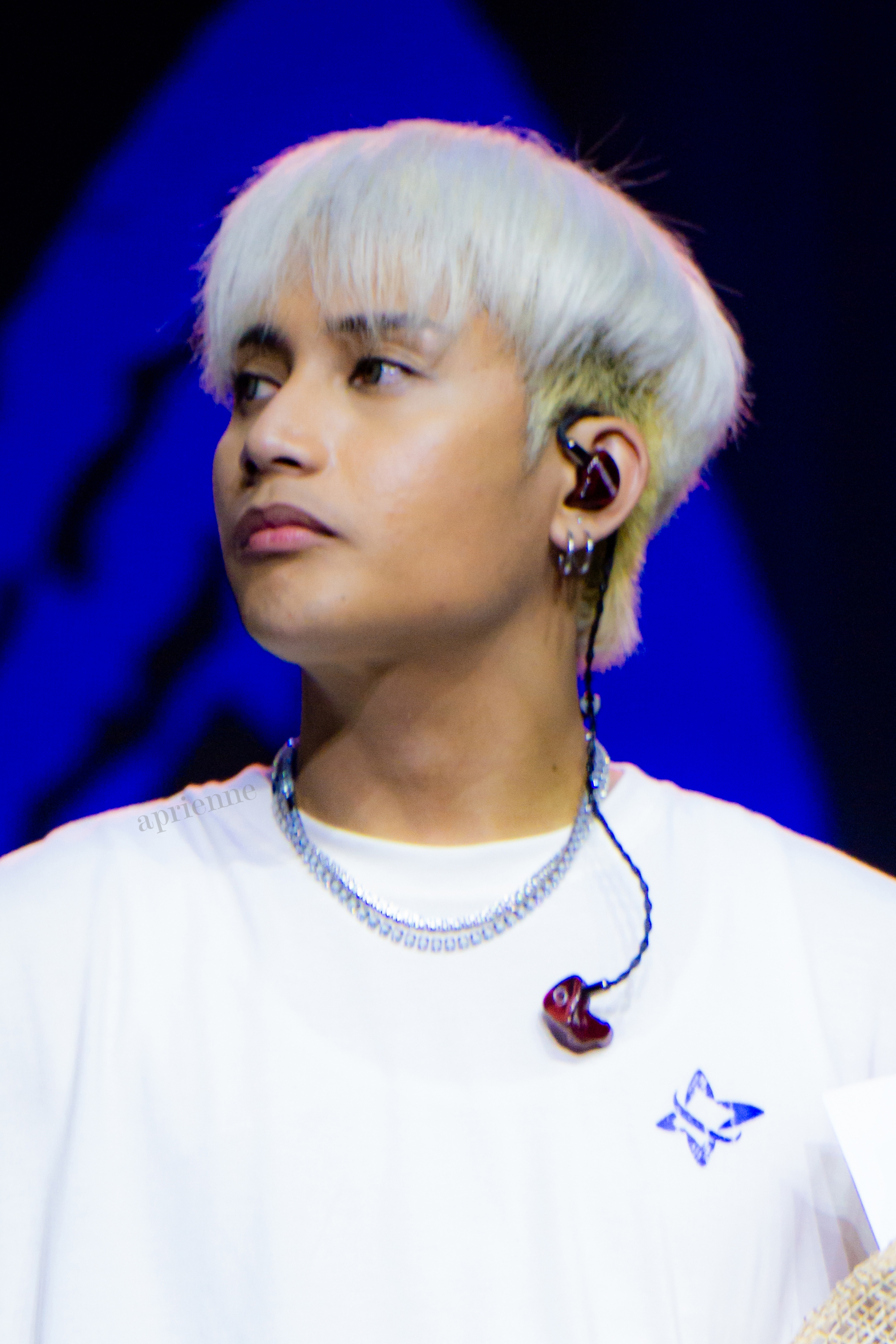
SB19 member Felip (pictured)

In 2017, the Filipino-American artist Karencitta released the single "Cebuana", a dance pop song with lyrics written in a mix of Cebuano and English. The song had a transformative impact on the Vispop genre. The 2020s saw a significant increase of Vispop hits in mainstream Philippine music, most of which are written in a mix of Cebuano and other languages, primarily English and Tagalog. In September 2021, Maris Racal released a pop-rock single about heartbreak titled "Asa Naman" (transl. Where), which featured verses in Tagalog and choruses in Cebuano. She explained that Rico Blanco, her partner at the time, encouraged her to write a full song in Cebuano. However, she was "worried that not everyone would understand it", so she decided to write the song partially in Tagalog. The song won "Best Regional Recording" at the 35th Awit Awards in 2022. In her partly Cebuano acceptance speech, Racal said, "We all know that when we write songs, we should write our truth, and part of my truth is that I'm born in Tagum, Davao. I grew up Bisaya!" She encouraged musicians to stop being afraid of writing songs in Philippine languages beyond Tagalog. Also in September 2021, SB19 member Felip made his solo debut with "Palayo" (transl. Walk Away), a Vispop song about ending a toxic relationship.

In 2022, the English chorus of the song "LDR" by Jared Almendras, better known as Shoti, went viral on social media across the globe. In an August 2024 interview with Juno Reyes of Rappler, Shoti shared that he was shocked to hear the audience singing along to the Cebuano lyrics as well when he performed the song in Manila, assuming that they were only familiar with the English chorus that went viral. He said, "I'm always gonna be putting Bisaya and English together in all my songs."

In October 2022, Gitamondoc alluded to "Manila organizers[...] gearing up their machinery to stage multiple music festivals during Sinulog Week", and urged Cebuanos to stand by the Visayan Pop Songwriting Campaign despite their lack of "clout" and funding. He wrote, "We will not be forever relegated to the sidelines. We will not be a mere afterthought in a scheme to please the locals. We will not remain just front acts to Manila's main event."

=== 2023 to present ===
On December 6, 2022, Careless Music announced that it would stage the Wavy Baby Festival in Cebu amid Sinulog festivities in January 2023. The festival was marketed as "the first of its kind" for Sinulog. Kara Angan of Rappler noted that the Cebuano music acts were billed at the bottom of Wavy Baby's promotional poster, below foreign and Manila-based acts. The festival sparked backlash on social media when they removed most of the Cebuano music acts from the lineup. Vincent Eco from The Sundown, one of the Cebuano bands whose performances were canceled, was quoted as saying, "Yet again, [brands] will hold concerts in Cebu but Cebu bands were made disposable."

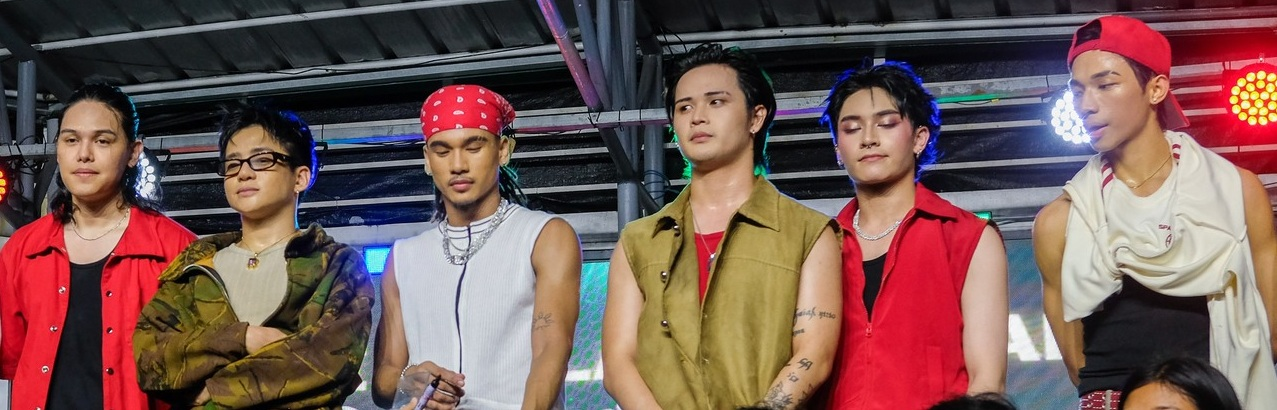
Alamat (pictured)

James Reid, co-founder of Careless, issued an apology to Cebuano music acts the Wonggoys, Three Legged Men, the Sundown, and Sepia Times on Instagram. He said, "Thank you for allowing us to come to your hometown and throw this amazing experience. I promise to make it up to you." The company released a separate statement, saying that they personally reached out to the Cebuano acts involved. Eventscape Manila, one of the festival's producers, issued another statement blaming the removal of Cebuano acts from the lineup on inclement weather and logistical difficulties.

Writing for Rappler, Kara Angan criticized Wavy Baby for "capitaliz[ing] on [Cebuanos'] cultural festival yet remov[ing] a platform for Cebuanos to showcase their experiences through music". Angan suggested that the incident illustrates how the cultural, economic, and social divide between Manila and the Visayas and Mindanao regions manifests in all aspects, even music. Julienne Loreto of Positively Filipino wrote that 2023 and 2024 were "rough" years for Vispop. They observed that the mainstream industry seemingly no longer believed that the genre was "worth the gamble", adding that the regional scene also "suffered" without any new "smash hit" songs. However, they said that "glimmers of hope have emerged here and there".

In June 2023, the multilingual P-pop boy group Alamat released "Day and Night", with lyrics in Cebuano, English, and Tagalog. The song was co-written by Villarante-Langit. In August, Maymay Entrata released "Tsada Mahigugma". The title is a Cebuano phrase that translates to "It feels great to be in love", and is prominently featured throughout the song. Billboard Philippines included it in their end-of-year "Top Filipino Releases of 2023" list, a curated list of reader picks. In January 2024, Cebuano actor-singers Juan Karlos Labajo and Kyle Echarri released "Kasing Kasing" (transl. Heart), a Vispop ballad that is fully in Cebuano. Labajo and Echarri initially planned to write the song in Tagalog, but decided to write it in their native language instead. They shared that they felt Cebuano music lacked representation in the Philippines' mainstream music industry. In an interview, Echarri said, "We wanted to show how Bisaya people are with our language with how we express our emotions[...]," adding that the two hoped to normalize using Cebuano in songs.

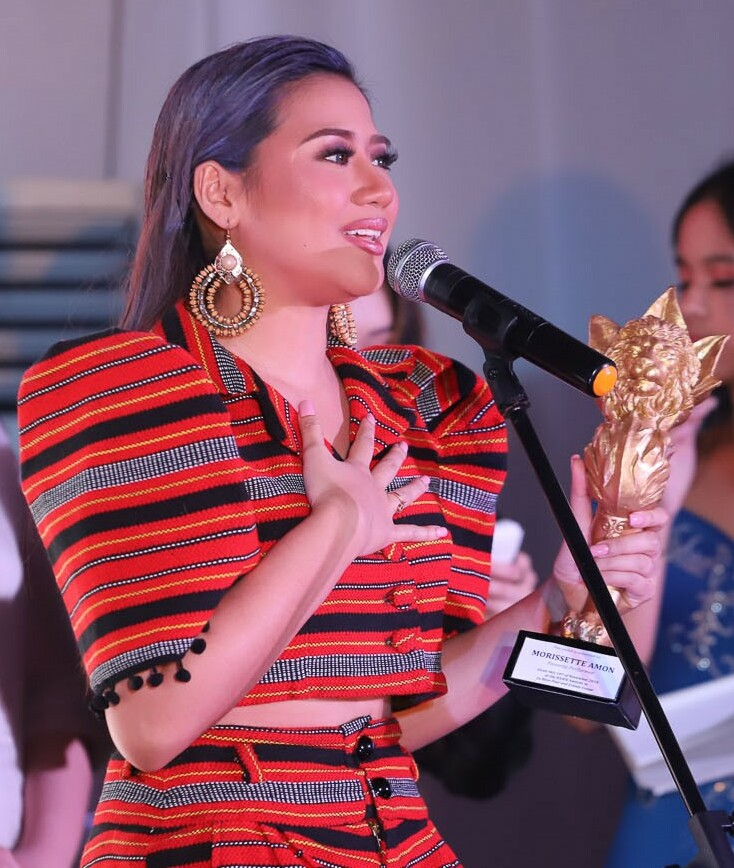
Morissette Amon (pictured)

In the same year, Cebuano artist Dom Guyot released the queer song "Free" and declared that Vispop was "here to stay". A Rappler interview published on January 8, 2025 revealed Morissette Amon's plans to release more songs in Cebuano and further emphasize her Cebuano background to the public. According to Amon, other people had pressured her to talk and sing in Filipino when she was still new to the industry. She added, "I'm just happy to be one of the artists in Manila who is helping push for VisMin pop and our amazing songwriters and creatives in the South."

On March 5, Cebu City councilor Joel Garganera proposed the Bisaya Music Preservation and Promotion Ordinance. It mandates that "at least 30 percent" of background music in Cebu's public establishments should be in Cebuano and calls for the formation of a new annual music festival. The estimated cost for the ordinance is "no less than ₱5 million". Some local musicians have criticized it, outlining their suggested revisions in a position paper. The paper argues that the proposed ₱5 million budget should instead be spent on fixing "structural" issues that affect Vispop artists, such as improving access to funding.
