= DXLL =

DXLL may refer to:

- DXLL-AM, an AM radio station broadcasting in Zamboanga City, branded as Mango Radio
- DXLL-FM, an FM radio station broadcasting in Davao City, branded as Max FM
- DXLL-TV, a defunct TV station in Zamboanga City
