= Popstar Diaries =

- Presented by: Sarah Geronimo
- Country of origin: Philippines
- Original language: Filipino

Production
- Running time: 30 minutes
- Production company: Viva Television

Original release
- Network: Pinoy Box Office and Viva TV
- Release: September 4, 2010 – 2019

Popstar Diaries is a Philippine television show on Viva TV with a slogan "It's the Pop Princess uncovered". Originally, it is a program shown at Pinoy Box Office channel from September 4, 2010 to 2019.

== Overview ==
The show focuses on the professional life of actress and singer Sarah Geronimo.

Popstar Diaries airs every Saturday at 9 p.m., with encore every Monday at 3 p.m., Wednesdays at 7 p.m. and Fridays at 9 a.m. on Pinoy Box Office channel.

The show debuted on July 16, 2012 on Viva TV when Viva Television revived Viva TV on the air. After a 9 years hiatus, the channel was relaunched as the new 24 hour all-Filipino general Entertainment channel on Cable and Satellite, along with the launch of new programming except Popstar Diaries which is the only Viva produced program since 2009 from Pinoy Box Office channel.

== Episodes ==
The 30-minutes show captures behind the scenes, showbiz engagements - from photo shoots, studio recording, rehearsals, mall tours, TV guesting and movie events.

== Cast ==
=== Main cast ===
- Sarah Geronimo

=== Special Participation ===
- Mark Bautista
- Various Viva Records artists
- G-Force Dance Company
- Various colleagues in the industry

== Theme song ==
The theme song used on the show is Sarah Geronimo's various song recordings or singles in an album.

== See also ==
- Viva TV
