= DYUR =

Radio station in Cebu City, Philippines

TMC (DYUR)
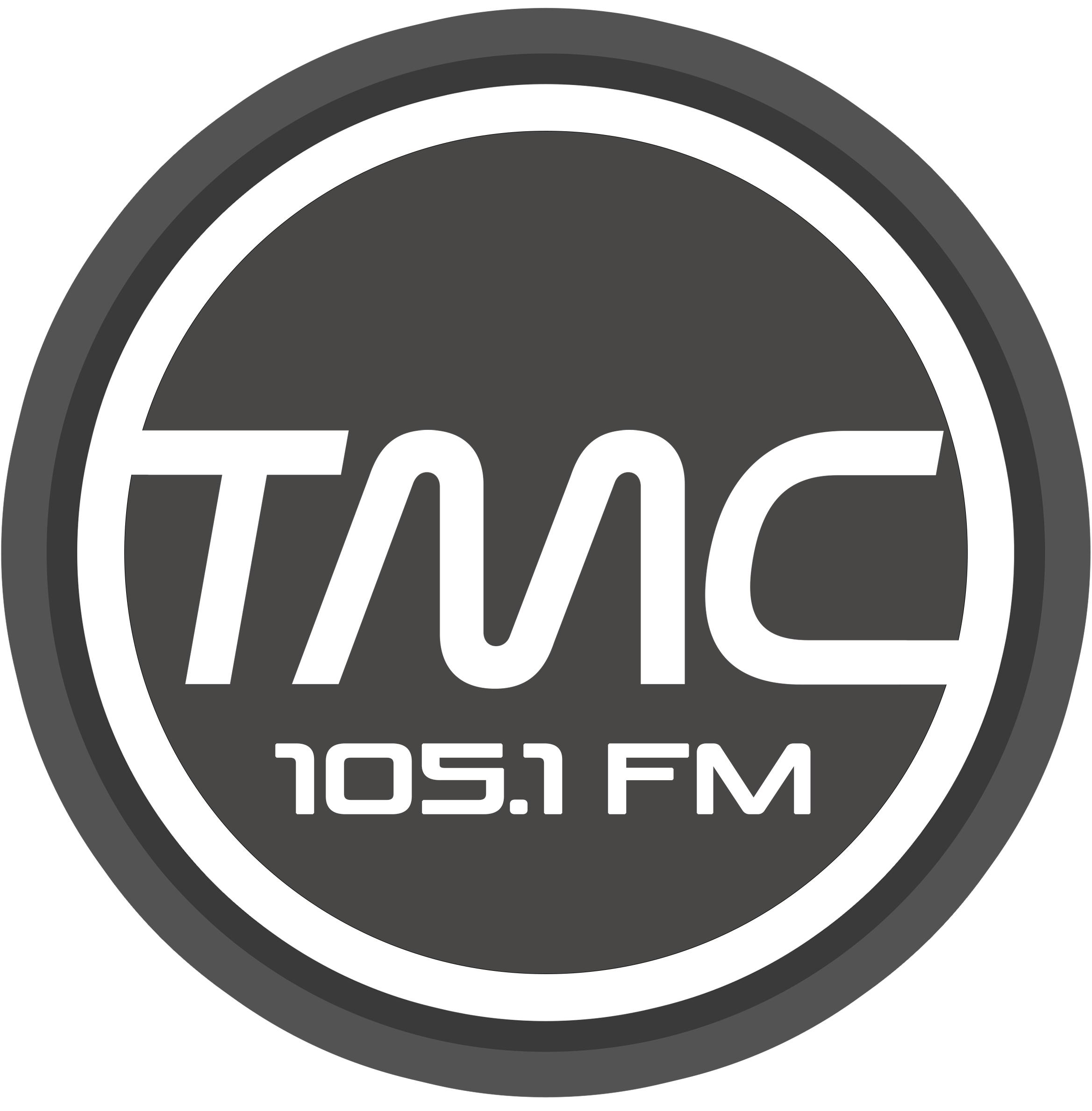
- Cebu City; Philippines
- Broadcast area: Metro Cebu and surrounding areas
- Frequency: 105.1 MHz (FM Stereo)
- RDS: TMC
- Branding: 105.1 TMC

Programming
- Languages: Cebuano, Filipino
- Format: Vispop, OPM

Ownership
- Owner: Viva South; (Ultimate Entertainment Inc.)
- Operator: Tops Media Center

History
- First air date: 1993
- Former names: UR105 Ultimate Radio (1993–2010); Mango Radio (2010-2013); Oomph Radio (November 2014-February 2017); Halo Halo Radio (May 2017-August 2024)
- Call sign meaning: Ultimate Radio (former branding)

Technical information
- Licensing authority: NTC
- Power: 10,000 watts
- ERP: 50,000 watts
- HAAT: 663 meters

Links
- Webcast: Listen Live
- Website: topsmediacenter.com

DYUR (105.1 FM), broadcasting as 105.1 TMC, is a radio station owned by Ultimate Entertainment Inc. and operated under an airtime lease agreement by Tops Media Center, the broadcast arm of TOPS Media Cebu Corporation. Its studio and transmitter are located at Unit 401, 4th Floor, Tops Circle, Brgy. Malubog, Busay, Cebu City.

== History ==
=== 1993-2010: UR105 Ultimate Radio ===
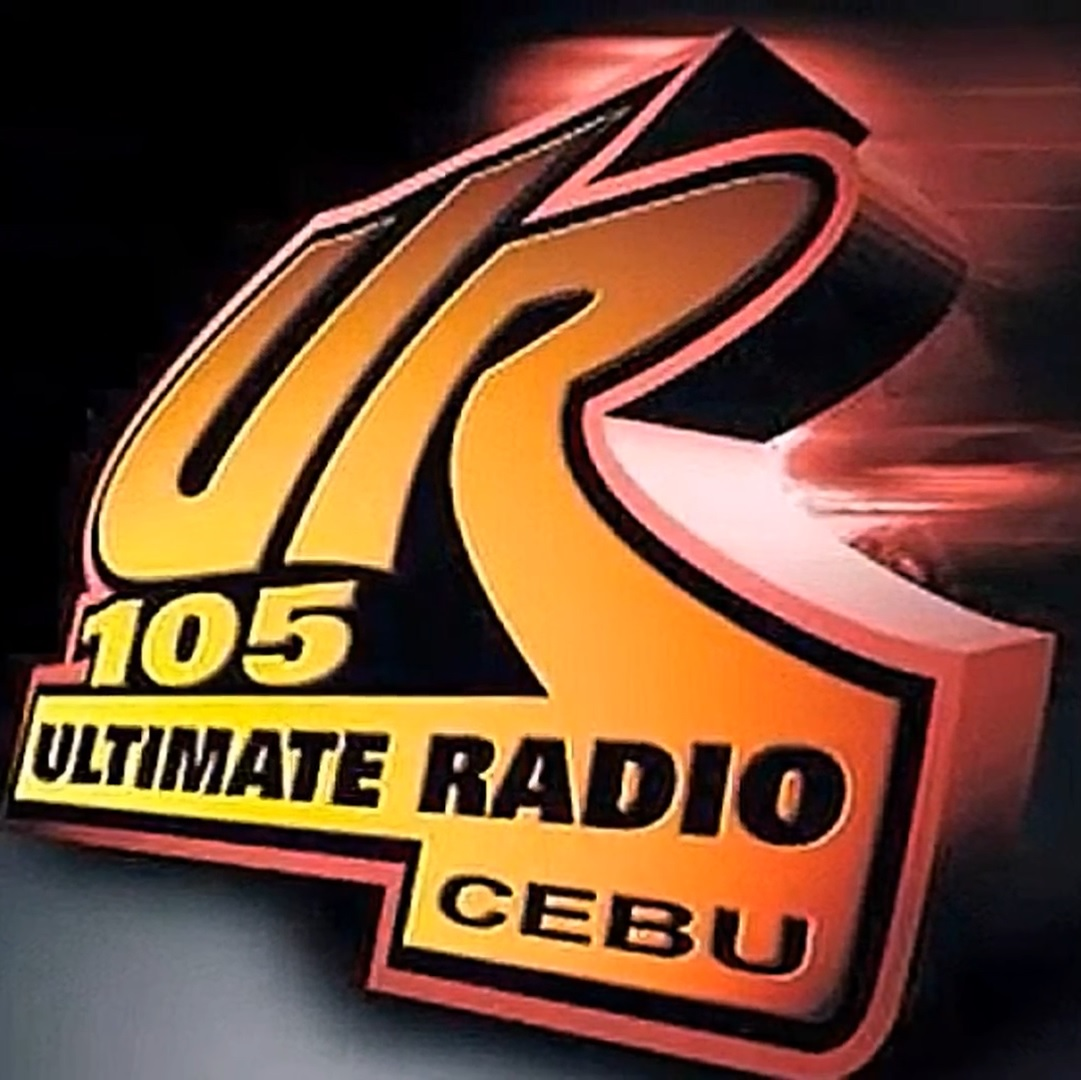
UR105 Ultimate Radio (1993 - 2010)

The station was established in 1993 as UR105 Ultimate Radio. Being the first station opened by Ultimate Entertainment, it carried a CHR/Top 40 format. Among the station's talents were Big Brother Bryan, Brenda Starr, Sandy Storm, Dindo, Rendall, Sir Charles, Ryk Orion, McHalley, Joe Phoenix, Bo Fisher and Stephen Lo. It was initially located in the fourth floor of JRDC Building along Osmeña Boulevard until the late 2000s, it relocated to the second floor of AMP Building in Lower Nivel Hills.

=== 2010-2013: Mango Radio ===
In 2010, following the success of a daily Christian program that was launched a year before, the station rebranded as Mango Radio UR105 and switched to a christian radio format. It also simulcasts a handful of programs from Mango Radio Davao.

It went off the air sometime on the 4th quarter of 2013. Earlier that year, Viva South acquired the franchise of Ultimate Entertainment from the Manalang family, prompting Mango Radio to move its broadcasts online.

=== 2013-2017: Oomph Radio/UR105 ===
Oomph! Radio (2015 - 2017)

In October 2014, the station returned on air under test broadcast, along with a newly purchased Nautel NV10 transmitter. The following month, it started carrying the brand Oomph Radio 105.1, marking Viva Group's first venture in Philippine radio. It carried a CHR/Top 40 format with its slogan "Nice Paminawon". Oomph Radio was officially launched on September 13, 2015, at The Terraces Ayala Center Cebu, featuring James Reid, Nadine Lustre, Yassi Pressman, Andre Paras, Donnalyn Bartolome, Sheyee, Thyro, Yumi, Jeric Medina and MJ Cayabyab, and local acts.

On May 26, 2016, the station brought back its UR105 branding. However, by the end of July 2016, the station rebranded back to Oomph Radio and introduced Anime, J-Pop and K-Pop music to its programming.

In February 2017, the Oomph Radio brand was dropped permanently due to management decision.

=== 2017-2024: Halo Halo Radio ===
Halo Halo 105.1 (2017 - 2024)

On May 1, 2017, the station was relaunched as Halo Halo, the first and only FM station in each city playing only Original Pilipino Music.

In 2019, the station moved to the third floor of The Space Building in Mandaue, where Viva's satellite offices are also located.

In 2020, at the height of the COVID-19 pandemic, Halo Halo Radio transition to a fully automated OPM station.

On December 16, 2021, the station went off the air for the second time as an effect of Typhoon Odette (Rai)'s onslaught, but it returned on-air few weeks later in January 2022 after the power was restored in the station's building.

On August 2, 2024, Halo Halo Radio quietly signed off for the last time.

=== 2024-present: 105.1 TMC ===
On August 10, 2024, Tops Media Center, owned by content creator James Magik (also known as 'Kuya Magik') and former Y101 FM personality Jiggy Jr. (later became as Jiggy Juice), took over the station's operations and brought it back on air as 105.1 TMC, taken from its namesake. It is the city's first radio station to carry a Vispop format. It transferred to its new home in the fourth floor of Tops Circle in Busay, Cebu City. The station was officially launched on September 27, 2024.

On January 9, 2025, 105.1 TMC went off the terrestrial air due to the technical upgrades and the transmitter renovation, continuing its broadcast online through TMC's website. It formally resumed operations on terrestrial radio on February 5.
