= Jude Gitamondoc =

Filipino songwriter

- Born: Jude Thaddeus Gitamondoc; 1979 (age 46–47); Surigao del Sur, Philippines
- Genres: Vispop; pop; adult contemporary; Christmas; Christian; Buddhist; hymns; musicals
- Occupations: Songwriter, bookwriter, record producer, musical director, theatre director
- Instruments: Vocals, piano, guitar
- Years active: 2001–present

Jude Gitamondoc (born Jude Thaddeus Gitamondoc) is a Filipino songwriter, record producer, musical director, and stage director based in Cebu, Philippines. He has won several awards including two Awit Awards, ABS-CBN's Himig Handog TFC Choice Award, StarStudio Reader's Choice Award, Cebu Pop Musical Festival, Golden Screen Awards, and Gawad Urian Award. He has composed, arranged, produced and/or contributed songs for Filipino artists including Regine Velasquez, Piolo Pascual, Toni Gonzaga, KC Concepcion, Gary Valenciano, Eric Santos, Kyla, among others. In addition, he was commissioned in the production of several musical plays both original and adaptations, including 2017's Gugmang Giatay. He also co-founded the Visayan Pop Songwriting Campaign (Vispop), a yearly songwriting competition for songs written in the Cebuano language.

== Early years ==
Gitamondoc hailed from Surigao del Sur, Philippines. His musical interests started early at age six when his brother brought home a keyboard. He went to study in Don Bosco Missionary Seminar in Lawaan, Talisay City, Cebu, and was mentored by Salesian administrators and musicians who taught him the rudiments of songwriting and piano-playing.

Later, he left the seminary and pursued his interests in music by enrolling at the College of Music in University of the Philippines - Diliman but quit after two semesters upon realizing that the curriculum was more focused on avant-garde music, and he was more interested in mainstream pop genre. It was during this time that he encountered Katha, an organization made up of Filipino musical talents including the 1995 World Youth Day theme song composer Trina Belamide and Arnel de Pano, who composed the Basil Valdez hit song Lead me Lord.

== Career ==
Gitamondoc began his professional music career in 2001. He had created several commissioned songwriting gigs such as producing commercial jingles (Casino Rubbing Alcohol, Happy Booster Hotdogs), theme songs (Mantawi Festival Theme Song), school hymns and wedding songs. His first big break was Gary Valenciano's Relevance album in 2006, to which he contributed five songs: Kailan Pa, Only a Friend, Sana Bukas, Wait Forever, and In Another Lifetime. The album, however, took three years before it was released.

== Musicals ==
=== Siddhartha: A Musical Journey to Enlightenment ===
He made the English musical Siddhartha: A Musical Journey to Enlightenment based on the works of Hsing Yun, founder of the Fo Guang Shan Buddhist Order. About the life of Siddharta Gautama, it was first staged at the Waterfront Cebu City Hotel & Casino in 2007. Later productions were staged in Manila, Iloilo, Bacolod, Taiwan, USA, Singapore, Malaysia, Hong Kong, Macau, New Zealand and Japan. Critic Alphonzo Alegrado of Theater Fans Manila, gave a positive review of the production particularly the musical compositions of Gitamondoc, writing, "Siddharta's composer and lyricist Jude Gitamondoc is a phenomenal artist. The arrangements (some of which are inspired by the poetry of Ven. Master Hsing Yun) have layers upon layers of various instruments, creating full, resonant tones that could only be invigorated when performed by a live orchestra. "

=== Song of Bernadette: A Musical of Our Lady of Lourdes Story ===
He composed for the musical Song of Bernadette: A Musical of Our Lady of Lourdes Story. About the story of Saint Bernadette Soubirous, its first staging was held at SM City Cebu Cinema 1 on July 5–6, 2008.The production coincided with the 150th anniversary of apparition of the Virgin Mary in Lourdes, France celebrated by the Archdiocesan Shrine of Our Lady of Lourdes Parish in Labangon, Cebu City.

The musical was later re-staged in the celebration of 60th anniversary of the parish on February 17–19, 2017, and it was produced again in cooperation with Kintar and Divine Mercy of Love Community the next year for the 160th anniversary of the Apparitions. It was held at the Centerstage of SM Seaside Cebu City on February 16–18, 2018.

=== Zephyrin: The Musical ===
In 2008, he wrote and produced original songs for Zephyrin: The Musical, directed by Daisy Baad. Set in 18th century Argentina, the musical depicted the life of Blessed Ceferino Namuncurá and featured the Don Bosco Technology Center talents and Cebuano personalities, including regional TV host Roy Empleo.

In 2023, he wrote and directed an updated version of the musical, presented by Don Bosco Technical College and Sanchez Llenos Accounting Office.

=== You've Been Facebooked! The Musical ===
In 2013, he was the playwright, songwriter, and musical director for the musical romantic comedy You've Been Facebooked!. Directed by Jingle Saynes, it starred Mark Jude Tenedero, Bea Samson, Jacqueline Chang, Malaya Macaraeg and Clark Van Daryl Jolbot. Cebu Daily News editor Eileen Mangubat reviewed the production, "There was no dull moment. The music was a delightful surprise – catchy melodies and lyrical solos that were easy on the ear. For non-theater goers, the experience left many asking if this was a Broadway show adapted for a local audience." The show was included in BroadwayWorld Philippines' 13 Unforgettable Plays, Musicals of 2013.

=== Gugmang Giatay ===
Together with Rowell Ucat, Jude Gitamondoc co-wrote the Bisrock jukebox musicale, Gugmang Giatay. Debuted in 2015, Gugmang Giatay was directed by Edison Saynes and staged at CAP Theater Cebu, SM Seaside City Cebu, Waterfront Cebu City Hotel and Casino, Lahug, and BGC Arts Center. It was chosen by the Philippine Daily Inquirer as the Best Musical in 2017, with editor Gibbs Cadiz commenting, "While it could stand a bit more pruning and polish, this production from Cebu was a joyous blast of authentic musicality and sassy fun. It was performed completely in Cebuano (accompanied by supertitles), but one didn’t mind, because the piquant language itself, along with the repertoire of classic and contemporary Visayan melodies and the exuberant but disciplined performances of the cast, added up to a rockin’ show of unexpected sweetness and charm."

=== You're a Good Man, Charlie Brown ===
Gitamondoc was the musical director of Cebu adaptation of the Broadway musical, You're a Good Man, Charlie Brown, which was a production of the Cebu-based theater group Vaudeville Theatre Company.

=== The Addams Family ===
He was also commissioned as musical director of another Vaudeville Theatre Company production, The Addams Family, that was staged in October, 2018. Based on the popular characters by Charles Addams, it was an adaptation of the Broadway musical of the same name with the music and lyrics by Andrew Lippa and book by Marshal Brickman and Rick Elice.

=== Monsters: The Musical ===
In 2019, he wrote and directed Monsters The Musical, another jukebox musical featuring the songs of Cattski. The musical, choreographed by Jaggy Gomez and produced by Margo Frasco of MDF Productions, is a coming-of-age love story about two friends, Bea and Elle, and their journey of self-discovery along with battling their monsters together.

=== Star and Cloud: The Musical ===
In 2024, he wrote and directed Star and Cloud The Musical, a musical retelling of the life of Venerable Master Hsing Yun, founder of Taiwan-based Buddhist organization Fo Guang Shan, based on his biography Bright Star, Luminous Cloud by Fu Zhiying.

== Visayan Pop Songwriting Campaign (Vispop) ==
Gitamondoc was one of the founders of the Visayan Pop Songwriting Campaign, a contest for songwriters producing music in Cebuano language with the objective of coming up with Cebuano pop songs that could be aired as part of FM radio playlist. In 2009, Gitamondoc and Atty. Philip Landicho proposed the idea to Ian Zafra, Cattski Espina, and Lorenzo Ninal of Artists and Musicians Marketing Cooperative (Artist Ko), a local multipurpose cooperative for artists, musicians and entrepreneurs. The first Visayan Visayan Pop Songwriting Campaign (Vispop) was slated to be staged in 2010, but it was not implemented due to inadequate funding.

In 2012, the first Vispop was launched with the support of the Artists and Musicians Marketing Cooperative (Artist Ko) and the Filipino Society of Composers, Authors, and Publishers (FILSCAP). In November 2017, Gitamondoc left Artist Ko and his affiliation with the competition. He also made his reasons for leaving public when Vispop 2019 was launched in 2019.

== Influences ==
Gitamondoc credited his years and the formation he received in the seminary for his decision to pursue music later in his life, acknowledging the influences of Salesian administrators, as well as David Foster, Michael Smith and Diane Warren, as well as Jose Mari Chan, Louie Ocampo, Trina Belamide, Gary Granada, and Ryan Cayabyab.

== Teaching ==
Gitamondoc had conducted songwriting courses and workshops such as the Children's Pop Music Festival in 2008 and in 2009, which was organized by the Cebu provincial government through the Provincial Council for the Welfare of Children. In 2010, he facilitated the Harmony Songwriting Workshops organized by The International Buddhist Progress Society of Manila, Philippines, and produced the songs that were composed by the participants during the workshop.

At the Cebu-based Brown Academy of Music, he taught a course on songwriting. He had also facilitated the following: Cebu Music Creators Growth Summit in 2016, and VISPOP Song Writing Workshop conducted in several colleges and universities in 2012, in 2014, and in 2017; and Tagumpay Songwriting Bootcamp on July 2–4. 2017 organized by the Tagum City government.

== Works ==
=== Cebuano songs ===
Song	Role	Year	Details	Ref
"Matahum Nga Cebu"	Composer	2010	Station ID of Real Cebu TV (RCTV)	
"Bisaya Baya Ni Bay"	Composer	2014	Interpreted by Ralph Mallapre	
"Hahahasula"	Composer	2016	Interpreted by Kurt Fick	
"Shodi na ngal"	Composer	2015		
"Pero Atik Ra"	Co-composer	2016	Interpreted by Jacky Chang	
"Puhon"	Composer	2016	Interpreted by Kurt Fick	
"Morena Girl"	Composer	2017	Interpreted by Hey Joe	
"In Love Ra Kutob"	Composer	2018	Interpreted by Kurt Fick	
"Pasko sa Amoa"	Composer	2018	Interpreted by Mandaue Children's Choir	
"Puslan Man"	Composer, Lyricist, and Producer	2018	Interpreted by Tim Pavino	

=== Pop songs ===
Song	Role	Year	Details	Ref
"One More Chance"	Composer	2007	Included in Piolo Pascual's "Timeless" album and a soundtrack of "One More Chance" film	
"What are the Chances"	Arranger	2007	In Toni Gonzaga's "Falling in Love" album	
"Wait Forever"	Composer	2007	Carrier single of Gary Valenciano's Relevance album	
"In Another Lifetime"	Composer	2007	In Gary Valenciano's Relevance album and theme song in GMA's "Eternity" film	
"Impossible"	Composer	2008	Interpreted by KC Concepcion	
"Kakayanin Ko Ba"	Composer	2008	Interpreted by Ariel Rivera	
"Breathe You"	Composer	2010	In KC Concepcion's "KC" album	
"We Will Rise Again"	Music and Lyrics	2010	Interpreted by Raki Vega	
"However Much Love"	Composer	2011	In Nina's "Stay Alive" album	
"Believe in the Dream"	Composer	2011	In Nina's "Stay Alive" album	
"If You Have To"	Composer	2011	In Erik Santo's "Awit Para Sa'yo" album	
"I Believe in You"	Composer	2011	In Juris Fernandez' "Forevermore" album	
"Don't Be Too Nice"	Composer	2012	In Krizza Neri's "Krizza" album	
"French Fries and Coke"	Composer	2012	In Krizza Neri's "Krizza" album	
"Proper Heartbreak"	Co-composer	2018	In Kyla's "The Queen of R&B" album	

=== Inspirational songs ===
Song	Role	Year	Details	Ref
"Make A Stand"	Composer	2011	Year of the Youth and Episcopal Youth Commission (ECY) 25th Anniversary theme song	
"Beyond the Horizon"	Composer	2013	Salesian Youth Day 2013 theme song	
Nathaniel (Gift of God)	Composer	2014	In Regine Velasquez' "Hulog Ka Ng Langit" album	

== Awards ==
Year	Work	Award	Category	Result	Ref
2006	"Not Today"	Pinoy Dream Academy		Finalist	
2007	"In Another Lifetime"	Awit Award	Best Ballad	Won	
2008	"Pasayloa Ako"	Cebu Pop Music Festival	Grand Prize	Won	
2008	"Bisan Pa"	Cebu Pop Music Festival		2nd Runner Up	
2012	"Sa Muling Pagtatagpo"	Golden Screen Awards	Best Original Song	Won	
2012		Archdiocese of Cebu	Sugbuanong Laiko Award	Won	
2012		Cebu Chamber of Commerce and Industry	Outstanding Talento	Won	
2013	"This Song is for You"	ABS-CBN's Himig Handog		Finalist	
2014	"Nathaniel (Gift of God)"	Awit Award	Best Inspirational/Religious Recording	Won	
2014	"Song on a Broken String"	Philippine Popular Music Festival		Finalist	
2014	"If You Don't Want to Fall"	ABS-CBN's Himig Handog		Finalist	
2015	"Song on a Broken String"	Awit Award	Best Rock/Alternative Recording	Finalist	
2016	"Hahahasula"	MOR Pinoy Music Awards	Regional Song of the Year	Won	
2017	"Hahahasula"	Cebu Siloy Music Award	Best Song	Nominated	
2017	"Gugmang Giatay"	Philippine Daily Inquirer	Best Musical	Won	
2018	"Sinsilyo"	Cebu Siloy Music Awards	Best Song	Won	
2020	"Usa Ka Libo Ug Usa Ka Panamilit"	43rd Gawad Urian Awards	Best Music	Won	

== See also ==
- Visayan Pop Songwriting Campaign
