= Viva Cinema =

Cable TV channel in the Philippines

- Masayang Balik-Balikan!
- Country: Philippines
- Broadcast area: Worldwide
- Network: Viva Networks

Programming
- Languages: Filipino; English
- Picture format: 480i (SDTV); 1080i (HDTV)

Ownership
- Owner: Viva Communications
- Parent: Viva Communications
- Sister channels: Celestial Movies Pinoy; Pinoy Box Office; Tagalized Movie Channel; Sari-Sari Channel (defunct)

History
- Launched: February 1, 2009 (second incarnation of Viva Cinema); July 16, 2012 (as Viva TV); August 1, 2021 (current incarnation of Viva Cinema)
- Former names: Viva TV (2012–2021)

Viva TV Plus
- Broadcast area: Worldwide
- Network: Viva Networks

Programming
- Language: Filipino

Ownership
- Owner: Viva Communications
- Sister channels: Pinoy Box Office; Tagalized Movie Channel; Sari-Sari Channel (defunct)

History
- Launched: 2005
- Former names: Viva TV (2005–2021)

Viva Cinema (formerly Viva TV and stylized in uppercase as VIVACINEMA) is a Philippine entertainment television channel owned by Viva Communications, available on satellite and cable TV providers.

== History ==
Logo used from July 16, 2012 to July 31, 2021

The channel was launched as Viva Cinema on February 1, 2009, the day Cignal Digital TV also began operation. The channel's programming line-up consisted of previous teleseries produced by Viva Television, Filipino films and Hollywood films, as well as televised interviews related to upcoming domestic and international films.

On July 16, 2012, the channel was relaunched as Viva TV, and began broadcasting music videos, talk shows, reality series, concerts and behind the scenes from films featuring some of Viva Communications artists, including Sarah Geronimo, Anne Curtis, KC Concepcion, among others. Viva TV ended its broadcast operations on July 31, 2021.

On August 1, 2021, the channel brought back the Viva Cinema branding for the second time. It currently features archived movies produced and/or distributed by Viva Films or Viva Video until 1998 (since August 2026) and archived concerts produced by Viva Live.

== Programming ==
=== Current programming ===
As of December 2025, Viva Cinema is divided into various programming blocks:

- Drama Cine – a block consisting of drama films. It airs weekdays at 8:00 AM and 10:00 PM.
- Aksyon Cine – a block consisting of action films. It airs daily at 10:00 AM, weekdays at 12:00 NN, and Mondays to Thursdays at 4:00 PM.
- Comedy Cine – a block consisting of comedy films. It airs weekdays at 2:00 PM and 6:00 PM.
- Viva Cinema Presents – a block consisting of films starring their featured artist for the week. It airs weeknights at 8:00 PM.
- Mega Cine - a block of films starring Sharon Cuneta. It airs Fridays at 4:00 PM.
- Back to Back Cine – a block consisting of back to back films based on certain themes. It airs weekends at 12:00 NN.
- Cine Manoy - a block of films starring Eddie Garcia. It airs Sundays at 6:00 PM.
- Sabado Cine – a block consisting of digitally enhanced films. It airs Saturdays at 8:00 PM.

=== Former programming ===
Viva TV

- Anong Ganap? (2017–21 Viva TV; still airs on PBO and streaming via Viva One)
- Daily Top 10 (2012–21)
- OPM TV (2017–21)
- Especially4 You (2012–21)
- ANNEbishowsa (2012–21)
- Live at Amerasian (2012–21)
- Rap Sessions (2014–21)
- Karaokray (2012–21)
- Dobol or Samting (2014–21)
- Pinoy Star Stories (2012–21)
- Front Row (Concerts from Viva Live) (2012–21)
- #JADINE (2014–20)
- Wapak (2012–21)
- StarBiz
- Star Yayey (2012–21)
- CineBest (a Filipino movies from PBO) (2017–21)
- Star Homes (2017–21)
- The Jon Santos Show (2012–21)
- Chillin' with Chicser (2013–21)
- Oh My Guardians (2017–21)
- OneSong (2018)
- Pantaxa
- Popstar Diaries (2012–19)
- KC.Com
- Becky Nights
- Petra's Panniest
- The OPM Show (2017–21)
- Ogie Alcasid Classic (2017—18)

Viva Cinema

- Fantacine – a Saturday night block consisting of fantasy films.
- Concert Cine – a Sunday night block consisting of archived concerts.
- Cine Manoy – a Sunday night block of films starring Robin Padilla.

== See also ==
- Viva Communications
- Studio Viva
- Pinoy Box Office
- Sari-Sari Channel (defunct)
