= Viva Communications =

Philippine media company

Viva Communications Inc.
- Logo used since 2018

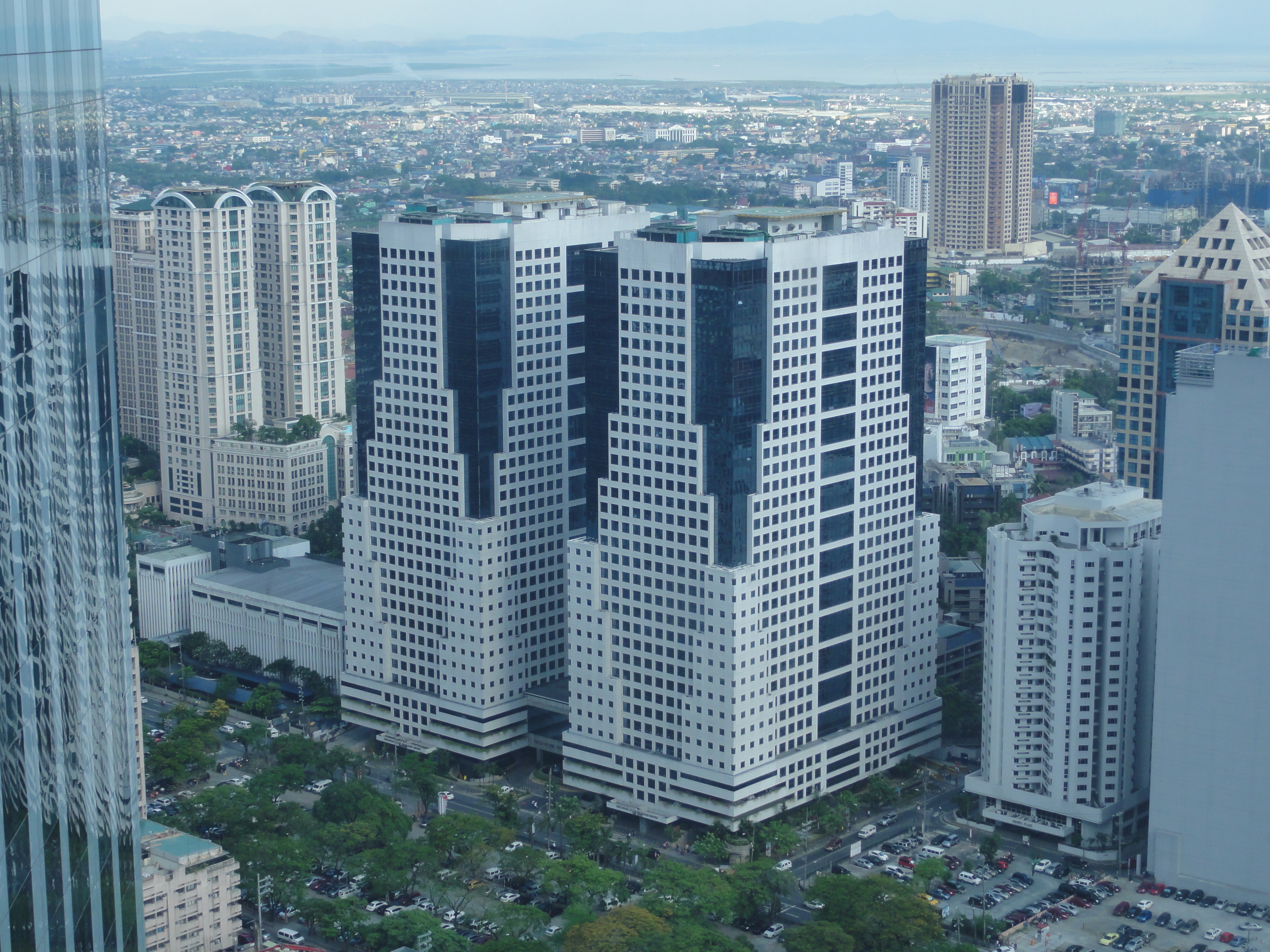
- The Philippine Stock Exchange Centre in Ortigas Center, Pasig, the headquarters of Viva Communications.
- Trade name: Viva Entertainment Inc.
- Type: Private
- Industry: Mass Media; Entertainment
- Founded: November 11, 1981; 44 years ago
- Founder: Vic del Rosario Jr.; Tess Cruz
- Headquarters: 7/F East Tower, Tektite Towers, Exchange Road, Ortigas Center, Pasig, Metro Manila, Philippines
- Area served: Worldwide
- Key people: Vicente del Rosario Jr. (Chairman and CEO); Vincent del Rosario (President and COO); Valerie S. del Rosario (Senior Vice President for Content Creation)
- Products: Books; Films; Music; Television programs; Web portals; Foods; Beverages; Sporting events
- Brands: Botejyu; Celestial Movies Pinoy; Halo-Halo Radio; Oomph TV; Paper Moon Cake Boutique; Pepi Cubano; Pinoy Box Office; Tagalized Movie Channel; VMX; Viva Cinema; Viva Movie Box; Viva One; Viva TV Plus; Wing Zone; Yogorino
- Services: Broadcasting; Motion pictures TV production Cable television Internet; Streaming service Record label Satellite television Film distribution Licensing; Foodservice
- Revenue: ▲ ₱4.9 million (2023)
- Number of employees: 370 (2023)
- Divisions: Viva Artists Agency; Viva Digital; Viva Interactive; Viva Live; Viva Networks; Viva Sports
- Subsidiaries: Studio Viva; Ultimate Entertainment; Viva Films; Neo Films (1995–2003); Viva International Food and Restaurants; Viva International Pictures; Viva Music Group; Viva Publishing Group; Viva Video
- Website: www.viva.com.ph

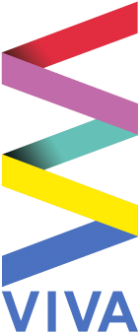
Viva Communications logo from May 2010 to March 2018.

Viva Communications Inc., also known as Viva Entertainment Inc. and simply Viva (stylized in all caps) is a Philippine-based media company headquartered in Ortigas Center, Pasig. It was founded in 1981 by Vic del Rosario Jr. and his sister Tess Cruz.

== History ==
Viva Communications was founded on November 11, 1981, by Vic del Rosario Jr. and his sister Tess Cruz, originally incorporated as Viva Films, a film production studio located in New Manila, Quezon City. In 1988, the company established Viva Television, which was followed by Viva Records in 1986.

In 1997, VCI established its own talent agency, Viva Artists Agency (VAA).

In 1999, following the effects of the 1997 Asian financial crisis, the company acquired Vintage Television (VTV). In February 2000, Vintage Television was renamed as Viva TV, a primetime sports and entertainment programming block on the Intercontinental Broadcasting Corporation (IBC), which ran until March 1, 2003.

In 2013, Viva Communications acquired PSICOM Publishing Inc. from the Gabriel family, later renamed as Viva PSICOM Publishing Corporation.

In 2016, VCI established its food and beverage division, Viva International Food and Restaurants, with a grand opening at Botejyu restaurant in the Philippines. Its first store was at the SM Mall of Asia in Pasay.

In 2019, Viva Communications joined the local-language film consortium Globalgate Entertainment, which is led by American mini-major film studio Lionsgate.

On January 29, 2021, VCI launched its own video on demand streaming platform, Vivamax.

On January 29, 2023, the second anniversary of Vivamax, the company launched its second streaming platform, Viva Prime, renamed Viva One in February.

== Divisions ==
=== Viva Communications Inc. (VCI) ===
- Viva Films
  - Neo Films (1995–1999, 2002–2003, liquidated)
  - Falcon Films (1983–1988, 1995–1998, liquidated)
  - Scorpio Films (1996–1998, liquidated)
- Studio Viva (formerly Viva Television)
  - Vintage Television
  - Mega Productions (co-owned by Sharon Cuneta and Del Rosario family)
- Viva International Pictures (VIP)
- Viva Artists Agency (VAA)
- Viva Live (formerly Viva Concerts & Events)
- Halo Halo Radio (Ultimate Entertainment)
  - Halo Halo Radio 97.1 Davao
  - Halo Halo Radio 103.5 Zamboanga
- Viva Interactive
- Pay and Free TV Networks
  - PBO: Pinoy Box Office
  - Viva Cinema (formerly Viva TV, from STAR TV package)
  - TMC: Tagalized Movie Channel (co-owned with MVP Entertainment)
  - Sari-Sari Channel (defunct; joint venture with Cignal TV/TV5 Network Inc.)
  - K Movies Pinoy (defunct)
  - Viva TV Plus (formerly Viva TV)
  - Filipino TV (defunct)
  - Joint venture with A+E Networks
    - History
    - H2 (defunct)
    - Fyi (defunct)
    - Crime & Investigation Network
    - Lifetime
  - Joint venture with Celestial Tiger Entertainment
    - Celestial Movies Pinoy
- Digital Networks
  - Oomph TV (multichannel network, social media agency)
  - VMX (over-the-top streaming service)
  - Viva One (formerly Viva Prime, over-the-top streaming service)
  - Viva Movie Box (over-the-top streaming service specializing in short, mobile-first, vertically-shot video micro drama series)
- Viva Video, Inc. (Viva Communications' home video subsidiary)
- Video City (liquidated)
- Viva Sports (liquidated)

=== Viva Music Group (VMG) ===
- Viva Records
- Vicor Music
- Villar Records
- Prime Music Corporation
- Verje Music Publishing (VMP)
- Harmony Music Publishing
- Amerasian Recording Studios
- O/C Records (affiliate; label owned by Kean Cipriano)
- Ivory Music and Video (formerly the Philippine licensee of Sony Music Entertainment's catalog from 2011 to 2018)
- GMV Studios (partnership w/ GMA Music)

=== Viva Publishing Group Inc. (Viva Books) ===
- Viva PSICOM Publishing Corporation (formerly PSICOM Publishing Inc., 50%) - joint venture with the Gabriel family
- Viva Starmometer Publishing Corporation (formerly Starmometer Publishing Company, 50%) - joint venture with Edsel Roy
- VRJ Books Publishing

=== Viva International Food and Restaurants Inc. (Viva Foods) ===
- Botejyu
- Paper Moon Cake Boutique
- Pepi Cubano
- Yogorino
- Wing Zone

== Notable brands and subsidiaries ==
=== Viva Networks ===
Viva Networks is the cable television division of Viva Communications, that was established in 2003. It operates cable channels, including PBO, Viva Cinema, Viva TV Plus, Tagalized Movie Channel and Celestial Movies Pinoy.

==== Viva TV Plus ====
Viva TV Plus (formerly known as Viva TV) is a Philippine international television channel owned by Viva Communications, that was launched in 2005. The channel broadcasts 24/7.

=== Viva South/Halo Halo Radio ===
Halo Halo Radio is a brand name for Viva's radio stations in Davao and Zamboanga, and previously in Cebu City. It was launched as Oomph! Radio before the end of 2014, following Viva's acquisition of Ultimate Entertainment's broadcast franchise from the Manalang family, who spun-off its concert and theatrical production arm into a new entity as Ultimate Shows. Its format playlist consisted of local and international songs.

In May 2016, Viva Live briefly dropped the Oomph! Radio brand and went to an independent branding among stations by adding 70s, 80s and 90s music to its playlist, despite retaining its format and the Ultimate Radio name. In July 2016, however, Viva Live brought back the Oomph! Radio brand and its Top 40/OPM format. In February 2017, the Oomph! Radio brand was dropped permanently due to management decision.

In May 2017, Oomph! Radio was relaunched as Halo Halo Radio, an all-OPM station, with its music catalogue prioritizing those performed by Viva music talents.

In August 2024, its Cebu station was rebranded as 105.1 TMC with a Vispop music format, after it entered an airtime lease agreement with Tops Media Cebu Corporation.

==== Viva South Radio stations ====
Branding	Callsign	Frequency	Power (kW)	Coverage
TMC 105.1 Cebu	DYUR	105.1 MHz	10 kW	Cebu City
Halo Halo Radio Davao	DXUR	97.1 MHz	10 kW	Davao City
Halo Halo Radio Zamboanga	DXUE	103.5 MHz	10 kW	Zamboanga City

=== Viva Video ===
Viva Video Inc. (formerly Viva Home Entertainment, doing business as Viva Video) is the exclusive distributor of video products for local and international studios in the Philippines. Viva Video is the home video affiliate of Viva Communications Inc.

Viva Video is the home video and DVD distribution arm of Viva Communications with the exclusive distributor of video products including films and television series.

The company releases titles from the film and television library of Viva Films, as well as programs from other Viva Entertainment companies. Currently, they also serve as the distributor for television and/or movie product licensed by Nickeloedeon, Universal Pictures Home Entertainment, 20th Century Studios Home Entertainment, Cartoon Network, Big Idea Productions (makers of VeggieTales DVDs), Turner Entertainment Co., Cookie Jar Entertainment (partnership with DIC Entertainment from 1994 until 2008), Walt Disney Studios Home Entertainment (since 2014, distribution of Disney material had shifted to Magnavision Home Video), Skyfilms, Nine Network (makers of Hi-5 DVDs), Summit Entertainment, Lionsgate Home Entertainment, Sesame Workshop (makers of Sesame Street), HIT Entertainment, and MGA Entertainment internationally for the Philippine market, and local products from Viva Films, Star Cinema, GMA Pictures, APT Entertainment, OctoArts Films, Regal Entertainment, Unitel Pictures, The IdeaFirst Company, Solar Entertainment, MQ Studios, FPJ Productions and Pioneer Films.

Viva Video holds licenses for:

Local

- Viva Films
- Star Cinema
- GMA Pictures
- APT Entertainment
- OctoArts Films
- Regal Entertainment
- Unitel Pictures
- The IdeaFirst Company
- Solar Entertainment
- MQ Studios
- FPJ Productions
- Pioneer Films
- KP Entertainment Philippines

International

- Cookie Jar Entertainment (formerly Cinar, Filmfair and DIC Entertainment)
- 20th Century Home Entertainment
- Walt Disney Studios Home Entertainment (including Touchstone Home Entertainment)
- MGM Home Entertainment, phased out in 2005 as MGM Holdings
- ABC
- MGA Entertainment
- Summit Entertainment
- Lionsgate Home Entertainment
- Syndicate Films
- Emperor Motion Pictures
- Lakeshore Entertainment
- Mandate Pictures
- Icon Entertainment
- Bauer Martinez
- Inferno Distribution
- Cineclick Asia
- Cinema Service
- Miro Vision
- Skyfilms (distribution duties are also shared by Star Home Video)
- Nick Jr.
- Nickelodeon
- Nine Network (makers of Hi-5 DVDs for the Philippine market)
- HIT Entertainment
- Big Idea Productions (makers of ‘’VeggieTales’’ DVDs for the Philippine market)
- Sesame Workshop (makers of Sesame Street DVDs for the Philippine market)
- Cartoon Network
- Turner Entertainment
- Universal Pictures Home Entertainment
- Playboy Home Entertainment

=== Video City ===
Video City was the video retail affiliate of Viva Video, the home video unit of Viva Communications, Inc. As of 2015, all of the stores in the country are closed.

=== Viva Sports ===
Viva Sports was the sports division of Viva Communications that was launched in 1996 showcases the previous boxing fights of Manny Pacquiao as Blow By Blow aired on IBC 13 and Viva Boxing Greats on RPN 9 and also the throwback episodes of a basketball coverage of PBA and a billiards game of Efren Bata Reyes, Dennis Orcollo, Antonio Gabica and Francisco Bustamante.

=== Viva Artists Agency ===
Viva Artists Agency Inc. (VAA) is a talent agency owned by Viva Communications that was founded in 1997. The agency is currently headed by Veronique del Rosario-Corpus.

=== Viva-Psicom Publishing ===
Viva PSICOM Publishing Corporation (Viva PSICOM) is a publishing company jointly owned by Viva Communications and the Gabriel family. It was founded in 1990 by Arnel Jose Gabriel as a small desktop publisher, which later evolved into publishing the first Filipino wholly owned trade newspaper, the now-defunct Philippine IT Update.

The company, then known as PSICOM, rose to fame through the Diary ng Panget tetralogy authored by HaveYouSeenThisGirL.

In August 2013, Viva Communications acquired 50% of the company stocks, and it was later renamed as Viva-Psicom.

==== Products ====
===== Magazines =====
- OtakuZine
- Otaku Asia
- OtakuZine Anime Recommendation
- FH&S
- The GOLD Magazine
- Bare

===== Horror =====
- True Philippine Ghost Stories (Some stories were later adapted as episodes of GMA Network's Wag Kukurap.)
- Haunted Philippines (Some stories were later adapted as episodes of GMA Network's Wag Kukurap.)
- Pinoy Tales of Terror

===== Books by well-known authors =====
- Ramon Bautista (later moved to ABS-CBN Publishing)
- Tado
- Papa Dan of Barangay LS 97.1
- Papa Dudut of Barangay LS 97.1

===== Wattpad =====
- HaveYouSeenThisGirL
  - Diary ng Panget
  - Voiceless
  - She Died
  - That Girl
- Aly Almario
  - My Prince
  - He's a Kidnapper
  - The Other Side
  - Reaching You
- Alesana Marie
  - Talk Back and You're Dead
- Marcelo Santos III
  - Para sa Hopeless Romantic (republished)
  - Para sa Broken-Hearted
  - Mahal mo Siya, Mahal Ka Ba?

===== Japanese manga =====
- Hajime Isayama
  - Attack on Titan
- Mashima Hiro
  - Fairy Tail

===== Other genres =====
- Viva PSICOM Dark Series
- Kilig Republic
- GOLD Manga Series
