= Dom Guyot =

Filipino singer and songwriter

- Born: Dominic Guyot
- Origin: Cebu City, Philippines
- Genres: R&B; pop; OPM; Visayan pop
- Occupations: Singer; songwriter
- Years active: 2018–present
- Labels: Republic (UMG); Sony Philippines

Dominic Guyot is a Filipino singer and songwriter from Cebu City. He released his debut album Unbeloved (2021) and collaborated on "Habangbuhay/Habang Buhay" (transl. Forever/Long Life) (Note: Unless otherwise indicated, the titles of Guyot's songs are stylized in all lowercase.) with Janine Berdin in 2023 and on the single "Balik" (transl. Return) with Adie in 2024, followed by the released of "Kabit" in 2025. He is signed to Republic Records and Sony Music Philippines.

== Early life ==
Guyot was raised in Cebu, Philippines. He was introduced to music at home and watched concert recordings of international artists with his older brother. His father also exposed him to musical films such as The Phantom of the Opera, The Sound of Music, and Les Misérables. During high school, he stopped singing for a time after receiving negative comments about his voice. Before focusing on music, he worked as a dancer.

== Career ==
Guyot started his music career while studying at the University of San Carlos, performing as a dancer and appearing in music videos and live shows, he released his first single "Not Me" (Note: Not stylized in all lowercase.) in 2018. In 2021, he followed up with his debut album Unbeloved, a 12-track record featuring contemporary R&B, soul, and pop.

In 2023, Guyot released "Guho" (transl. Ruin), his first Tagalog-language composition, described as a serenade to a future partner and an expression of pride in his Filipino identity. In the same year, he collaborated with Janine Berdin on "Habangbuhay/Habang Buhay" (transl. Forever/Long Life).

In 2024, Guyot released the Visayan pop track "Free", which contained lyrics in Cebuano. (Note: The Cebuano language is more widely known by its endonym, Bisaya.) Later in the year, he released the single "Balik" (transl. Return) in collaboration with Adie.

In 2025, he released "Kabit" (transl. Mistress), an R&B and pop with Latin pop guitar riffs and a danceable beat. Guyot has performed at events including the Love Cebu Music Festival and the Sonata Bisaya Music Festival, sharing stages with fellow Cebuano artists such as Janine Berdin, Juan Karlos Labajo, and Adie.

== Artistry ==
Guyot music blends contemporary R&B and pop, with arrangements influenced by early 2000s music. His songwriting focuses on intimacy, longing, and queer identity.

He has cited artists such as Whitney Houston, Celine Dion, Mariah Carey, Beyoncé, Rihanna, Ariana Grande, Jhené Aiko, Summer Walker, SZA, H.E.R., Kehlani, Daniel Caesar, Ari Lenox and Korean R&B musicians such as Woodz, Dean, and Off On Off, as well as the groups Destiny's Child and TLC.

== Discography ==
=== Studio albums ===
- Unbeloved (2021)

=== Selected singles ===
- "Not Me" (2019)
- "Guho" (2023)
- "Habangbuhay/Habang Buhay" (with Janine Berdin) (2023)
- "Balik" (with Adie) (2024)
- "Free" (2024)
- "Body" (2024)
- "Kabit" (2025)
