= RPN USA =

- Country: Philippines
- Broadcast area: United States

Programming
- Languages: Tagalog and English
- Picture format: 1080i HDTV

Ownership
- Owner: Radio Philippines Network (Nine Media Corporation); Glocal Media

History
- Launched: 2005

RPN USA is a Tagalog satellite television International channel owned by Radio Philippines Network and Nine Media Corporation in partnership with Glocal Media. The channel offers a variety mix of programming, from RPTV, SolarFlix, Solar Sports and Aliw Channel 23. including classic original programming from RPN as well as programming from CLTV36 HD.

RPN USA is available for Dish Network subscribers in the United States.

== See also ==
- The Filipino Channel
- Radio Philippines Network
- CNN Philippines
- RPTV
- Kapatid Channel
- AksyonTV International
- NewsWatch Plus
- CLTV36 HD
- Solar Entertainment Corporation
- Nine Media Corporation
- Aliw Broadcasting Corporation
- Aliw Channel 23
- TV5 Network
- TV5
- Overseas Filipino
- Filipino American
