= DXKZ =

Radio station in Zamboanga City, Philippines

Mango Radio (DXLL)
Relay of DXYP Davao
- Zamboanga City; Philippines
- Broadcast area: Zamboanga City, Basilan and surrounding areas
- Frequency: 91.5 MHz
- Branding: Mango Radio

Programming
- Languages: English, Filipino, Cebuano
- Format: Christian radio

Ownership
- Owner: RT Broadcast Specialists
- Sister stations: DXLL-AM

History
- First air date: 1990s (as Wild FM); 2016 (as Mango Radio)

Technical information
- Licensing authority: NTC
- Power: 10,000 watts

Links
- Website: www.mangoradio.net

DXKZ (91.5 FM) is a relay station of Davao-based Mango Radio, owned and operated by RT Broadcast Specialists. The station's transmitter is located in Zamboanga City.

The station was formerly known as Wild FM under UM Broadcasting Network. Back then, its studios were located at the 3rd Floor, SKT Bldg. along Rizal St. In 2016, Mango Radio, through RT Broadcast Specialists, acquired the station.

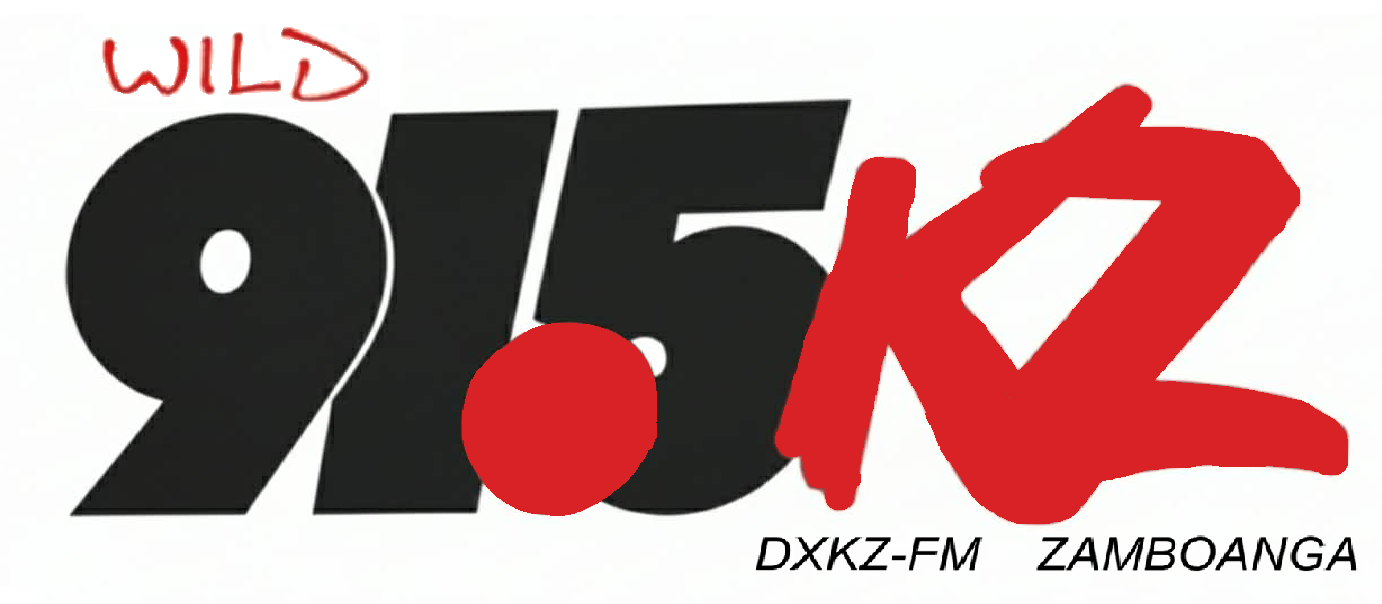
The First logo of DXKZ-FM 91.5 during the UMBN Era.
