= Pinoy Box Office =

Philippine pay television film channel

- "Una Ka Rito"
- Country: Philippines
- Broadcast area: Worldwide
- Network: Viva Networks

Programming
- Languages: Filipino; English
- Picture format: 480i (SDTV); 1080i (HDTV)

Ownership
- Owner: Viva Communications
- Sister channels: Celestial Movies Pinoy; Viva Cinema; Tagalized Movie Channel; Sari-Sari Channel (defunct); Viva TV Plus

History
- Launched: May 6, 1996
- Former names: Viva Cinema (1996–2003)

Availability

Terrestrial
- G Sat (Nationwide): Channel 45

Pinoy Box Office (PBO; stylized in all lowercase) is a Philippine pay television film channel owned by the Philippine media company Viva Communications. Its programming consists of films produced and distributed by Viva Films. Aside from films, PBO occasionally plays music videos from recording artists under Viva, concerts of its artists, and some original TV series and a few talk shows (including Anong Ganap?) exclusive to the channel and Island Living.

Former PBO logo used from August 1, 2003 to February 28, 2015

Former PBO logo used from March 1, 2015 to October 17, 2020 before major rebranding

== History ==
Plans to launch the channel were unveiled on December 7, 1994, with the launch date set to somewhere between June and August 1995. It would be broadcast using the then-new AsiaSat 2 satellite. STAR and Viva would co-produce 130 new titles a year.

The channel was originally launched as Viva Cinema on May 6, 1996, in partnership between Viva Entertainment in the Philippines and Star TV (later simply rebranded as STAR in 2001) in Hong Kong.

In 2003, STAR announced that the joint venture with Viva Entertainment would not be renewed after Viva Entertainment acquired the remaining stake of the channel from STAR Group Limited, meaning Viva Cinema would be closed down on June 30 of the same year. On August 1, 2003, Viva Cinema was rebranded as Pinoy Box Office.

PBO officially launched on August 1, 2003, replacing Viva Cinema in its channel space. This followed the termination of the brand licensing agreement between Viva Entertainment and STAR Group Limited, resulting in Viva Cinema’s closure on July 31, 2003.

On August 1, 2021, after Viva TV was renamed as Viva Cinema, PBO features films produced and distributed by Viva Films which were released at most 26 years behind the current year, as well as Anong Ganap?.

== Movie Jocks ==
- Phoemela Baranda (2014–present)
- Roxanne Barcelo (2014–present)
- Bea Santiago (2016–present)
- Mayton Eugenio (2016–present)
- Shy Carlos (2017–present)
- Bea Binene (2018–present)
- Kylie Verzosa (2016–present)

== See also ==
- Viva Entertainment
- Viva Television
- Viva Films
- Viva Cinema (formerly known as Viva TV)
- Cinema One
- Cine Mo!
- I Heart Movies
- SolarFlix
