= HaveYouSeenThisGirL =

Filipino author

Denny
- Born: February 11, 1994 (age 32); San Pablo, Laguna
- Education: Superiore I.P.C. Strocchi; Far Eastern University
- Occupation: Novelist
- Writing career
- Pen name: HaveYouSeenThisGirL
- Genres: Romance, comedy
- Notable works: Diary ng Panget; Voiceless; She Died
- Website: hystgstories.wordpress.com

Denny R. (born 11 February 1994, San Pablo City, Laguna, Philippines), commonly known by her pseudonym HaveYouSeenThisGirL, is a Filipino author. She is best known for her novel, Diary ng Panget. It first appeared on Wattpad and was later published as a paperback by PSICOM Publishing Inc. A film adaptation of her work was released in April 2014.

== Personal life ==
Denny was born in San Pablo, Laguna, where she studied from kindergarten to high school. She studied graphic advertising at Superiore I.P.C. Strocchi in Italy. She returned to the Philippines to study at Far Eastern University. She is fluent in three languages: Filipino language (Tagalog), English and Italian. She also speaks a little bit of French and Japanese. She is a qualified administrative secretary and holds a degree in Graphic Advertising.

== Works ==
Denny began writing stories at the age of 13. Her book, Diary ng Panget (Diary of an Ugly) has been a commercial success and widely followed in Wattpad. Due to its length, Diary Ng Panget was split into four volumes, each ending in cliffhangers. When the first volume hit the bookstores in May, it became the best-seller in an instant also with the remaining three volumes.The book has been adapted into a film.

She also wrote She Died, a manga series that also has been published on Wattpad. Her other works include Voiceless, that became popular because of the book's theme song "Hear Me", Waiting for the Train (under the GOLD Manga Series), Steps to You, That Girl, One Bad Move, I Met A Jerk Whose Name Is Seven and 10 Signatures To Bargain With God.

In 2021, she published a romantic-comedy book The Most Painful Battle under PSICOM Publishing Inc. Lie About Love was also published in the same year. In 2022 she announced that she was in the works of a new book titled Indelibel. Both Lie About Love and Indelibel were published on Wattpad
