= PBA Rush =

Filipino basketball pay TV channel

- Country: Philippines
- Broadcast area: Nationwide and Worldwide
- Network: TV5 Network
- Affiliates: One Sports

Programming
- Languages: English (main); Filipino (secondary)
- Picture format: 720p/1080i HDTV (downscaled to 16:9 480i for the SDTV feed)

Ownership
- Owner: Cignal TV, Inc. (MediaQuest Holdings Inc.); Philippine Basketball Association
- Sister channels: Through Cignal TV: NBA TV Philippines; Sari-Sari Channel; One News; One Sports+; One PH; BuKo; UAAP Varsity Channel; True TV; WilTV; Through TV5: TV5; RPTV; One Sports; Kapatid Channel; AksyonTV International

History
- Launched: July 5, 2016; 9 years ago

Links
- Website: cignal.tv

Availability

Terrestrial
- Cignal TV Nationwide: Channel 90 (SD); Channel 260 (HD)
- SatLite Nationwide: Channel 50

PBA Rush is a 24/7 exclusive channel of Cignal, which has been currently airing games of the Philippine Basketball Association (PBA). The channel is patterned after NBA TV and was launched on July 5, 2016. The 3-year partnership agreement between Cignal and the PBA was signed on July 17, 2016, at the Smart Araneta Coliseum, 2 days after the opening of the 2016 PBA Governors' Cup.

Aside from the live telecast of the PBA games (in English commentary), other programming included in PBA Rush are same-day replays of PBA games (in mostly Tagalog commentary), games from the PBA D-League, (also in mostly Tagalog commentary) and behind-the-scenes shows such as Kuwentong Gilas. The channel currently focuses on the ongoing season and conference.

The channel is aired on Channel 90 in standard definition and Channel 260 in high definition. Some programs of PBA Rush, are also aired international on the Kapatid Channel and AksyonTV International.

== Currently aired programs ==
- PBA games*
- PBA D-League games*
- The Chasedown
- Basketball Science
- Basketball Almanac with Lourd de Veyra
- Shootaround
- The Huddle
- StePBAck
- Jumpball
- Numbers
- Hotseat
- Fan Favorites (includes classic PBA games from 1980s to 1990s)
- PBA Playback

== Special programs ==
- The Maestro: Baby Dalupan

== See also ==
- TV5 Network coverage of the PBA
- RPTV
- One Sports
- One Sports+
- Philippine Basketball Association
- PBA Developmental League

== Notes ==
(*) also aired on Kapatid Channel (international) and AksyonTV International.
