= BuKo =

Filipino defunct comedy TV channel

- Country: Philippines
- Network: TV5; GMA Network (1995–2020s programs only); IBC 13 (Iskul Bukol and Okay Ka, Fairy Ko! only)
- Headquarters: TV5 Media Center, Reliance cor. Sheridan Sts., Mandaluyong, Metro Manila, Philippines

Programming
- Languages: Filipino (main); English (secondary)
- Picture format: 16:9 480i (SDTV)

Ownership
- Owner: Cignal TV (MediaQuest Holdings); APT Entertainment
- Sister channels: Kapatid Channel; One PH; One News; One Sports+; PBA Rush; UAAP Varsity Channel; True TV

History
- Launched: August 2, 2021; 5 years ago
- Replaced: ABS-CBN (Cignal TV channel space)
- Closed: August 1, 2026; 4 days ago

Links
- Website: cignal.tv

BuKo (Buhay Komedya) was a Philippine pay television channel owned by MediaQuest Holdings, Inc. through Cignal TV, in partnership with APT Entertainment based in Mandaluyong. The name is derived after buko, a Filipino word for coconut. The channel consists of comedic-entertainment programs for gag, sitcoms and variety shows, dubbed as the country's first local comedy channel. It was first announced in November 2019 and made its official launch on August 2, 2021, exclusively on satellite providers Cignal and SatLite.

After exactly five years of broadcast, BuKo ceased broadcast on August 1, 2026 due to programming redundancies, lack of advertising support, and cost-cutting measures.

== Programming ==
BuKo's programming content consists of classic local comedy shows from TV5, GMA Network and IBC, including the ones produced by TAPE Inc., M-Zet Productions, FOCUS Entertainment, Our Own Little Way Productions, APT Entertainment and TVJ Productions as well as a handful of original programming. The programming is divided into three programming blocks:

- BuKo Originals – the channel's flagship block consist of its original programs.
- Tawang Pinoy Klasiks! – the channel's treasure trove of classic comedies block.
- Throwback Tawanan – the channel's variety of popular programs block consist of comedy series and game shows.

== See also ==
- TV5
- Sari-Sari Channel
- RPTV
- IBC 13
- APT Entertainment
- Fox Filipino (defunct)
- ABS-CBN - the channel that formerly occupied on Cignal's channel space due to the franchise denial in July 2020
