= Sari-Sari Channel =

Defunct Philippine pay television network

- Country: Philippines
- Network: TV5; Viva Communications
- Headquarters: TV5 Media Center, Reliance cor. Sheridan Sts., Mandaluyong, Metro Manila, Philippines

Programming
- Languages: Filipino (main); English (secondary)

Ownership
- Owner: Cignal TV, Inc. (MediaQuest Holdings); Viva Networks (Viva Communications)
- Sister channels: Through TV5: TV5; One Sports; RPTV; Through Cignal TV: BuKo; Kapatid Channel; NBA TV Philippines; One News; One PH; One Sports+ PBA Rush; UAAP Varsity Channel; True TV; Through Viva: Celestial Movies Pinoy; Viva Cinema; Pinoy Box Office; Tagalized Movie Channel; Viva TV Plus

History
- Launched: January 15, 2016; 10 years ago
- Replaced: Weather Information Network (Cignal channel space)
- Closed: June 1, 2026; 4 months ago

Sari-Sari Channel (visually rendered in all capital letters as SARI SARI CHANNEL) was a 24-hour general entertainment channel under a joint venture between Cignal TV and Viva Communications. Named after the Philippine sari-sari store, it offers a smorgasbord of shows from the portfolios of Viva TV and TV5. The channel's content include archive shows and movies from Viva Television and Viva Films, original movies from Studio5, the film production arm of TV5 Network and in-house original productions in partnership of the latter's talents.

In 2015, Sari-Sari Channel was delegated as the official production outfit to handle all entertainment programs of TV5 after Viva Communications chief Vicente "Vic" del Rosario Jr. was appointed as the network's entertainment head, replacing Wilma V. Galvante, following the retrenchment on TV5's main entertainment department.

On October 21, 2017, selected original serials from the channel is broadcast on TV5 under the Sari-Sari Weekend on TV5 block. It is also carried over to its overseas counterpart Kapatid Channel since 2018.

In 2020, after Cignal TV took over the TV5 Network's management and operations, most episodes of Cignal-TV5-Viva produced shows are currently aired on this channel the next day after being shown on TV5.

The channel ceased broadcasting on June 1, 2026, due to continuing efforts on its direct-to-consumer service, Viva One as well as the new management of Cignal TV and its parent company MediaQuest Holdings led by President and CEO Ricky Vargas will no longer to renew a carriage and partnership agreement with Viva for unknown reasons.

== See also ==
- TV5
- RPTV
- One Sports
- BuKo (defunct)
- Colours (defunct)
- Viva Communications
- Jeepney TV
- Heart of Asia Channel
- Pinoy Hits (defunct)
- Fox Filipino (defunct)
