= DXLL-AM =

Radio station in Zamboanga City, Philippines

Mango Radio (DXLL)
Relay of DXYP Davao

Zamboanga City; Philippines
- Broadcast area: Zamboanga City, Basilan and surrounding areas
- Frequency: 1044 kHz
- Branding: Mango Radio

Programming
- Languages: English, Filipino, Cebuano, Chavacano
- Format: Christian radio

Ownership
- Owner: RT Broadcast Specialists
- Sister stations: 91.5 Mango Radio

History
- First air date: 1950

Technical information
- Licensing authority: NTC
- Power: 10,000 watts

Links
- Website: www.mangoradio.net

DXLL (1044 AM) is a relay station of Davao-based Mango Radio, owned and operated by RT Broadcast Specialists. The station's transmitter is located in Zamboanga City.

The station was formerly known as Radyo Ukay under UM Broadcasting Network. Back then, its studios were located at the 3rd Floor, SKT Bldg. along Rizal St. In 2016, Mango Radio, through RT Broadcast Specialists, acquired the station.
