= DXUR =

Radio station in Davao City, Philippines

Halo Halo Radio Davao (DXUR)
- Davao City; Philippines
- Broadcast area: Metro Davao and surrounding areas
- Frequency: 97.1 MHz
- RDS: UR97.1
- Branding: Halo Halo Radio 97.1

Programming
- Languages: Cebuano, Filipino
- Format: OPM
- Network: Halo Halo Radio

Ownership
- Owner: Viva South, Inc.; (Ultimate Entertainment, Inc.)

History
- First air date: 1996
- Former names: UR97 Ultimate Radio (1996–2010); Mango Radio (2010-2013); Oomph Radio (January 2015-February 2017)
- Call sign meaning: Ultimate Radio (former branding)

Technical information
- Licensing authority: NTC
- Power: 5,000 watts

Links
- Webcast: Listen Live (via Shoutcast)

DXUR (97.1 FM), broadcasting as Halo Halo Radio 97.1, is a radio station owned and operated by Viva South, Inc., a subsidiary of Viva Communications. The station's studio and transmitter are located at Unit 49, 4th Floor, Landco Corporate Center Bldg., J.P. Laurel Ave., Bajada, Davao City.

== History ==
The station was launched in 1996 as UR97 Ultimate Radio, carrying a CHR/Top 40 format. In 2010, after the success of a daily Christian program, the station rebranded as Mango Radio and carried a christian radio format.

Oomph! Radio (2015–2017)

In 2013, Viva South acquired the franchise of Ultimate Entertainment Inc., prompting Mango Radio to move its broadcasts online. In January 2015, the station went back on air as Oomph Radio with a CHR/Top 40 format. It was manned by jocks, most of them who used to work with the defunct Mix FM. In June 2016, the station rebranded back to UR97 and added 70s, 80s and 90s to its playlist, despite retaining its format. However, the following month, Oomph Radio returned on air. In February 2017, the Oomph Radio brand was retired once again due to management decision.

On May 1, 2017, the station was relaunched as Halo Halo Radio, the first and only FM station in each city playing only Original Pilipino Music.

== Halo Halo Radio stations ==
Branding	Callsign	Frequency	Power (kW)	Coverage
Halo Halo Radio 97.1	DXUR	97.1 MHz	20 kW	Davao City
Halo Halo Radio 103.5	DXUE	103.5 MHz	10 kW	Zamboanga City
