= Kapatid Channel =

Philippine pay television network

- Country: Philippines
- Network: TV5
- Headquarters: TV5 Media Center, Reliance cor. Sheridan Sts., Mandaluyong, Metro Manila, Philippines

Programming
- Language: Filipino
- Picture format: 720p/1080i HDTV (downscaled to 16:9 480i for the SDTV feed)

Ownership
- Owner: MediaQuest Holdings
- Parent: TV5 Network, Inc. Cignal TV, Inc.
- Sister channels: Through TV5: TV5; RPTV; One Sports; Through Cignal TV: One PH; One News; One Sports+; Sari-Sari Channel; NBA TV Philippines; PBA Rush; BuKo; UAAP Varsity Channel; True TV

History
- Launched: December 29, 2025; 9 months ago
- Replaced: 5 Plus (Cignal TV channel space); TV5 HD (Cignal TV channel renumbering space)

Availability

Terrestrial
- Cignal TV (Nationwide): Channel 15 (SD); Channel 256 (HD)
- SatLite (Nationwide): Channel 15

Streaming media
- Cignal Play (Philippines): Requires active monthly/yearly subscription

Kapatid Channel (lit. 'Sibling channel'), stylized as Kapatid, is a Philippine pay television channel owned by TV5 Network, Inc. while it is operated by Cignal TV, both subsidiaries of the media conglomerate MediaQuest Holdings. It was launched on December 29, 2025.

== Kapatid International ==
Kapatid International
- Country: Philippines
- Broadcast area: International; Canada
- Network: TV5
- Headquarters: TV5 Media Center, Reliance cor. Sheridan Sts., Mandaluyong, Metro Manila, Philippines

Programming
- Languages: Filipino; English
- Picture format: 720p/1080i HDTV (downscaled to 16:9 480i/576i for the SDTV feed)

Ownership
- Owner: TV5 Network, Inc. (MediaQuest Holdings)
- Parent: Pilipinas Global Network, Ltd.
- Sister channels: TV5; RPTV; One Sports; AksyonTV International; PBA Rush

History
- Launched: July 11, 2011; 15 years ago
- Replaced: The Mabuhay Channel
- Former names: Kapatid TV5 (2011–2018)

Links
- Website: kapatidinternational.com

Availability

Terrestrial
- Zuku TV (Kenya): Channel 110

Streaming media
- Vision PH (South Korea): Package
- Vidio (Indonesia): Package
- Lyca TV (United Kingdom): Package

Kapatid International (stylized as Kapatid, formerly Kapatid TV5) is a Philippine subscription television channel launched in July 11, 2011, owned by TV5 Network. Operated by its subsidiaries Pilipinas Global Network Ltd. and MQ Worldwide. It is targeted towards the Filipino diaspora.

The channel offers programming highlights from MediaQuest-owned television channels TV5, RPTV, One Sports, Sari-Sari Channel, One News, One Sports+, One PH, True TV, BuKo, PBA Rush, UAAP Varsity Channel, and MediaQuest's content production unit MQuest Ventures.

Former Kapatid TV5 logo (2011–18)

== Programming ==
Note: Program titles are listed in alphabetical order followed by the year it debuted in parentheses. Programs are aired on all Kapatid Channel International feeds except when noted.

=== Current programming ===
==== TV5 ====
Newscast

- Frontline Pilipinas (2020–present, delayed telecast) (Note: Airs with Filipino closed captions on certain providers.)
- Gud Morning Kapatid (2023–present, delayed telecast)

Series

- A Secret in Prague (2026–present, delayed telecast)
- My Bespren Emman (2026–present, delayed telecast)

Variety

- Eat Bulaga! (2024–present, delayed telecast)
- Vibe (2025–present, delayed telecast)

Talk

- Face To Face with Ate Koring (2024–present, delayed telecast)

==== BuKo ====
Travel

- #MaineGoals (delayed telecast) (Note: Airs with onscreen English subtitles.)

==== Sari-Sari Channel ====
Drama

- Kagat ng Dilim (delayed telecast)

==== One PH/True TV/One News ====
Public affairs

- Ted Failon at DJ Chacha sa True FM (delayed telecast)
- Gus Abelgas Forensics (2023–present, delayed telecast)
- The Chiefs (delayed telecast)

Infotainment

- 40 is the New 30 (delayed telecast)
- At Your Home with Anthony and Maricel (delayed telecast)

==== RPTV ====
- 2025–26 PBA season (delayed telecast)

==== International programs ====
- Makilala TV (Note: Available on Middle East & North Africa feeds.) (Note: Available on North America feeds.) (Note: Available on Asia Pacific feeds.)

==== Religious ====
- Word of God Network
- Healing Mass sa Veritas (simulcast on TV5, One PH, Veritas TV, True TV & 105.9 True FM)

== See also ==
- TV5 Network
- TV5
- AksyonTV International
- RPN USA
- TFC
- GMA Pinoy TV
