= Chikka =

Instant messaging application

Chikka, short for Chikka Text Messenger, was an Internet-based instant messaging application that supported free SMS or text messaging between online users and offline mobile subscribers. Chikka was released by Chikka Philippines, Inc. in 2000 and eventually established its connection with the country's network operators Smart Communications (2001), Globe Telecom (2002) and Sun Cellular (2004). With up to billions of messages being exchanged between online and mobile communities worldwide through Chikka, it is probably the world's first commercially successful integration of web and mobile utilities.

Headquartered in Pasig, Chikka Philippines powers other services for mobile instant messaging and email accessible via SMS, mobile payment systems utilizing airtime credits, Free-Reply SMS as an option for prepaid mobile subscribers in need of "top-up," mobile-enabled auctions, matchmaking and social networking as well as text, voice and visual mobile content.

The company's services were available to over 45 mobile carriers in fourteen countries including the Philippines, Hong Kong SAR, India, Indonesia, Italy, Japan, Spain, the United Kingdom, and the United States. In 2018, Chikka was shut down.

== Etymology ==
Pronounced as it is spelled, Chikka (\’CHI-ka\, derived from chika) is a colloquial Filipino term for '"small talk" or "chatter". As a verb, it translates to mingling easily, or doing anything with ease or in a clever manner. For Chikka, "small talk" refers to the nature of the many text and chat messages exchanged throughout online and mobile communities worldwide.

== History ==
Chikka Philippines, Incorporated, founded in 2000 by Chito Bustamante, Dennis Mendiola, and Alexandra Roxas, is headquartered in Pasig. It operates as a subsidiary of Chikka Holdings, Ltd. The owners of the company wanted to devise a customer service application that would connect Internet-to-mobile communities.

In 1999, Chikka began developing Chikka Text Messenger, which combines the features of instant messaging and SMS technology all available and accessible on a regular mobile phone. This application was originally intended for small e-commerce businesses that catered to the Filipino diaspora for the delivery of goods to the Philippines. It was designed to withstand SMS volume in a country sending 30 million messages daily.

Chikka was founded as a .com during the tail-end of the dot-com bubble in 2000. A year later, Chikka Messenger was launched.

The Chikka Text Messenger (CTM) was capable of translating instant messaging functionalities, such as presence detection (knowing which users are online), into SMS-enabled mobile phones. Effective anti-spam and privacy features were also built-in to assure primary customers in the network operators. Users would log on to Chikka using their mobile phone number and use instant messaging from a PC and continue to receive messages on their mobiles even when offline.

By the third quarter of 2002, Chikka Asia, Inc. had already launched multiple services that allowed it to seize market leadership in the local Value-Added Service (VAS) SMS market in the Philippines, especially on various corporate promo applications and SMS-based games.

In 2008, CEO Dennis Mendiola handed down CEO duties to Chito Bustamante, so as to focus on Product Development as Chikka's new Chief Imagination Officer. The company began taking steps towards an IPO or some other liquidity event for its investors. Apparent shareholder strife was revealed, when the raw findings by external auditor SGV, the Philippine partner of Ernst & Young of unliquidated cash advances by management of Chikka were leaked to Philippines media via a malicious "white paper" carrying the rumor.

Vindication for Chikka's Management ultimately came in 2009 when leading Philippine Telecommunications Smart Communications wholly acquired the company, keeping management intact to the present, with Chito Bustamante as CEO and Dennis Mendiola as de facto head of Product Development, even as he was appointed Chief Web and Internet adviser to Smart's Wireless Consumer Division.

On March 7, 2018, Chikka announced on their social media accounts that they are shutting down their service on March 31, 2018.

== Chikka Text Messenger ==
Chikka Text Messenger was the first instant messaging desktop client to support communication with mobile phones via SMS that allowed users to send free SMS messages to other users. Users who registered their mobile numbers could also receive messages on their phones whenever offline. Other platforms and devices where Chikka were available:

- Web Messenger
- Facebook App
- Google Chrome Extension via Chrome Web Store
- iOS via iOS App Store
- Android via Google Play Store

== Affiliates ==
As Chikka introduced Chikka Text Messenger in 2001, its affiliates launched other pioneering services based on shared patents, technologies and resources. Patented technologies have allowed these affiliated entities to create mobile versions of popular Internet models, specifically online auctions and dating.

=== Bidshot.com ===
Bidshot Wireless Services is an online auction site that has also patented mobile-enabled auctions with actionable SMS alerts, wireless item message boards and location-based classifieds.

In 2002, Chikka acquired Bidshot Wireless Services, Inc.

In the same year, patented technologies allowed Bidshot to successively launch interactive television, mobile-enabled games and polls, SMS marketing promos and made an entry into mobile content. Bidshot today has over 100,000 registered users.

=== Crushcow.com ===
Crushcow is a mobile-enabled personal ads and matchmaking site which allows users to create profiles, get alerted on their matches and chat anonymously via mobile phone.

The company has also become a provider of love, friendship, and romance-orientated mobile content.

== Chikka International ==
In 2003, Chikka entered into franchising agreements with partners in Thailand and in Indonesia that brought its services to major network operators in those countries. It went on to break records for daily VAS SMS volume generated by existing providers, quickly establishing Chikka as a major content provider in these markets.

Subsequently, Chikka also signed up with carriers in Singapore, Hong Kong and Japan for messaging and celebrity-texting services catering to the overseas Filipino community.

In 2005, the Chikka Messenger connected to major US carriers Cingular Wireless, Verizon Wireless, and AT&T Wireless, the top three mobile network operators in the United States. Together with Sprint, Alltel and other carriers today, Chikka gained connectivity to 100% of US mobile subscribers.

In 2005, a partnership with Times Internet Ltd. (TIL), the new media arm of India's illustrious media conglomerate BCCL, launched the Chikka Messenger to all major operators, to cover 90% of mobile subscribers in India.

To provide extensive support to more international partners, Chikka obtained triple ISO certifications for Quality Management, Security and IT Project Management in 2005. Chikka's global headquarters in Pasig is the first Philippine-based company to obtain the triple certifications ISO 9001, BS 7799, and BS 15000.

In February 2006, the company acquired a CMMI Maturity Level 5, the highest level of certification for processes of I.T. organizations. A CMMI Maturity Level 5 certification puts Chikka along the ranks of the National Aeronautics and Space Administration (NASA), Intel Corporation, and Nokia; all of whom benchmark their processes with CMMI's Maturity Level 5.

The first quarter of 2007 saw the launch of Chikka Messenger in the United Kingdom for all major mobile carriers, making the service available to over 70 million mobile subscribers.

== See also ==
- Comparison of cross-platform instant messaging clients
- Comparison of instant messaging protocols
- Comparison of Internet Relay Chat clients
- Comparison of LAN messengers
- Comparison of VoIP software
- List of SIP software
- List of video telecommunication services and product brands
