= DXUE =

Radio station in Zamboanga City, Philippines

Halo Halo Radio Zamboanga (DXUE)
- Zamboanga City; Philippines
- Broadcast area: Zamboanga City, Basilan and surrounding areas
- Frequency: 103.5 MHz
- Branding: Halo Halo Radio 103.5

Programming
- Languages: Chavacano, Filipino, English
- Format: OPM
- Network: Halo Halo Radio

Ownership
- Owner: Viva South, Inc.; (Ultimate Entertainment, Inc.)

History
- First air date: 1996
- Former names: Planet 103 (1996); Ultimate Radio (1997–2013, June – July 2016); Oomph Radio (October 2014 – February 2017)
- Call sign meaning: Ultimate Entertainment

Technical information
- Licensing authority: NTC
- Power: 10,000 watts
- ERP: 25,000 watts

DXUE (103.5 FM), broadcasting as Halo Halo Radio 103.5, is a radio station owned and operated by Viva South, Inc., a subsidiary of Viva Communications. The station's studio and transmitter are located at Room 404, BGIDC Bldg., Nuñez St. cor. Tomas Claudio St., Zamboanga City..

== Profile ==
The station began operations in 1996 as Planet 103, carrying a CHR/Top 40 format with the slogan The Spirit of Zamboanga. A year later, it rebranded as Ultimate Radio 103.5 UE.

Oomph! Radio (2015–2017)

In 2013, Viva South, Inc. acquired the franchises of Ultimate Entertainment Inc. In October 2014, the station went back on air as Oomph Radio, carrying a CHR/Top 40 format. In June 2016, the station rebranded back to 103.5 UE (Ultimate Entertainment) and added 70s, 80s and 90s to its playlist, despite retaining its format. However, the following month, Oomph Radio returned. In February 2017, the Oomph Radio brand was retired once again due to management decision.

On May 1, 2017, the station was relaunched as Halo Halo Radio, the first and only FM station in each city playing only Original Pilipino Music.

== Halo Halo Radio stations ==
Branding	Callsign	Frequency	Power (kW)	Coverage
Halo Halo Radio Davao	DXUR	97.1 MHz	10 kW	Davao City
Halo Halo Radio Zamboanga	DXUE	103.5 MHz	10 kW	Zamboanga City
