= Diary ng Panget =

Book series

- Diary ng Panget book 1 cover
- Diary ng Panget Complete Collection: Diary ng Panget; Diary ng Panget 2 Diary ng Panget 3 Diary ng Panget 4
- Author: HaveYouSeenThisGirL
- Cover artist: Jan Irene Villar
- Country: Philippines
- Language: Filipino, English
- Genre: Romance; Teen fiction Comedy
- Publisher: Viva-PSICOM Publishing Corp. (formerly known as PSICOM Publishing Inc.)
- Published: May 2013 - September 2013; March 2014 (Movie tie-in)
- Media type: Print (paperback)
- No. of books: 4

The Diary ng Panget (Diary of an Ugly Person) is a tetralogy series of romantic comedy novels by a Wattpad author under the name of HaveYouSeenThisGirL. The original, unedited story was first posted on the online literary site Wattpad. The story was split into four books and topped the rankings on the bestseller's list of Philippine publications in major bookstores.

In September 2013, during the Manila International Book Fair, Viva Films announced their acquisition of the title and its long-awaited film adaptation that was shown in 2014. This is the first movie adaptation of a story first published in Wattpad.

== Origins and publishing history ==
Described her piece as "Sobrang simple lang po, sobrang cliché, isang girl na mahirap na di kagandahan makaka-meet ng guy na suplado at mayaman. Yun lang po. (Very simple, very cliché: A poor plain Jane meets Mr. rich-and-snobbish. That’s it.)". Diary ng Panget became an internet sensation accounting the online novel with over 12 million reads. Its popularity gained the attention of Arnel Gabriel from PSICOM Publishing which held the account of turning the online novel into a book series and even hold the risk of publishing any Wattpad properties.

In late 2012, Gabriel wrote to the author about seeing her work as a physical book but due to mix-up with her email addresses, it took two months for Denny to reply.

Due to its length, Diary Ng Panget was split into four volumes, each ending in cliffhangers. When the first volume hit the bookstores in May, it became the best-seller in an instant also with the remaining three volumes.

The book version was the same as the Wattpad version except for some characters until its fourth volume came out and new content in it was different compared to the original ending in Wattpad. In May 2013, the eBook version of the story has been removed from Wattpad by the owner, in order to prevent further unauthorized reproductions of the work.

At the release of the last installment of the series, Denny released 2 new series, which are also from Wattpad, entitled Voiceless and She Died. Voiceless was published as a 2-part novel series while She Died is currently being published as a Filipino manga, with its reading direction alternate from the Japanese manga, from left to right and is illustrated by Enjelicious, with the assistance of Jeff Nice. Both of her series is again published by Viva-PSICOM Publishing Corp. (formerly known as PSICOM Publishing Inc.)

In March 2014, the series was again published as a movie tie-in and also spanning 4 volumes, which will be available on the nationwide caravan for Diary ng Panget the Movie. The movie tie-in edition is again published by Viva-PSICOM Publishing Corp.

== Main characters ==
- Reah "Eya" Rodriguez: (portrayed by Nadine Lustre in the film adaptation). The protagonist and narrator of the series, the titular 'panget'. Eya describes herself as an ugly person. She studies at Willford Academy and is a model of some products that don't need to show her face (Wattpad version only). She was hired by Mr. Sandford to be the personal maid of his son, Cross.
- Cross Sandford: (portrayed by James Reid in the film adaptation). A handsome, rich and snobbish teenager. He studies at Willford Academy. He works as a model for the popular clothing line Bench. Eya is his personal maid and has hated her ever since they've met. He is called by Eya as "Cookie Monster" because of his personality.
- Chad Jimenez: (portrayed by Andre Paras in the film adaptation). He studies at Wilford Academy. A handsome and rich teenager who has a crush on Lory. He is well known for his cheerful personality. Chad and Eya became friends because of an embarrassing situation. Eya is his closest friend who helps him get Lory.
- Lorraine "Lory" Keet: (portrayed by Yassi Pressman in the film adaptation). She studies at Willford Academy. A beautiful and rich teenager who has a crush on Cross. She is half-British and is crushed on by almost all of the boys at Willford Academy. She is one of Eya's close friends and helps her get Cross.

== Sales ==
All of the volumes had been on the bestseller's list on Philippine publication. The first three Diary ng Panget books have sold 140,000 copies combined.

== Film adaptation ==
The silver-screen adaptation is directed by Andoy Ranay, who is also known for directing When the Love Is Gone, and written by Mel del Rosario, who is known for writing Girl, Boy, Bakla, Tomboy and A Secret Affair. The movie stars Pinoy Big Brother alumni James Reid as Cross, Nadine Lustre as Eya, with Andre Paras as Chad, and Yassi Pressman as Lory.

== See also ==
- List of Filipino films based on Wattpad stories
