= Filipino Society of Composers, Authors and Publishers =

Copyright collecting society in the Philippines

- Abbreviation: FILSCAP
- Formation: June 1965; 61 years ago
- Type: Not-for-profit
- Headquarters: Quezon City, Philippines
- Coordinates: 14.631879°N 121.043930°E
- Key people: Arturo Lui Pio (President)
- Website: filscap.org

The Filipino Society of Composers, Authors and Publishers, Inc. (FILSCAP), is a collecting society in the Philippines. It undertakes collective rights management for public performances and use of songs in television and radio broadcast and movies.

FILSCAP's responsibility of royalty collecting extends to members of foreign affiliates such as the American Society of Composers, Authors, and Publishers (ASCAP), Broadcast Music Inc. (BMI), Composers and Authors Society of Hong Kong (CASH), and more than fifty other organizations. FILSCAP is the holder of deeds of assignment to collect royalties from artists both in within and outside the Philippines. Established in 1965, FILSCAP is one of the two Philippines’ music collective management organization. The other one is the Philippines Recorded Music Rights (PRM). FILSCAP administers and manages so-called “economic rights” for some composers. FILSCAP's mission statement is to provide a “consistent income stream” for its members through, creative licensing, collection, distribution of performance, mechanical reproduction, and, synchronization royalties.
