= Visayan Pop Songwriting Campaign =

Songwriting competition in Cebu, Philippines

Visayan Pop Songwriting Campaign, also known as Vispop or Visayan Pop Music Festival, is a Cebuano national songwriting campaign and competition for pop music compositions launched in Cebu City, Philippines on 2012. The competition is under the auspice of Artists and Musicians Marketing Cooperative (Artist Ko). From 2013 to 2017, it was staged in cooperation with the Filipino Society of Composers, Authors and Publishers (FILSCAP). The 2019 edition was organized with the partnership of Sacred Heart School for Boys - Batch 1985 Foundation, but the project was later shelved.

The campaign's winning entries became hits in various regional FM radio stations, even those that were in non-Cebuano speaking localities. The word "Vispop" also developed into an umbrella term to refer and describe songs produced from the contest and contemporary Cebuano music.

== History ==
In 2009, Jude Gitamondoc and Philip Landicho, an enthusiast in Cebuano music, proposed the idea of forming a Cebuano songwriting campaign and contest to help artists in songwriting and music production. The goal was to produce songs that could be aired as part of radio playlist. Gitamondoc and Landicho then joined Artists and Musicians Marketing Cooperative (ArtistKo), a local artist cooperative, where they presented the idea. The first Vispop was scheduled for 2010, but it did not push through due to inadequate funding.

In 2012, the first Vispop was launched through Artist Ko with the support of the Filipino Society of Composers, Authors and Publishers (FILSCAP). Its goals were to encourage songwriters to compose in Cebuano, the mother tongue spoken in central Philippines, Visayas, and most parts of Mindanao, and to introduce fresh, radio-friendly songs with mainstream appeal as an alternative to BisRock and local novelty songs. In his talk in the Tedx event organized by the University of San Carlos in 2015, founder Gitamondoc explained that Original Pilipino music (OPM) is not only exclusive of Tagalog songs but also those that are written in regional languages, and Vispop was conceived as a venue for Cebuano songwriting.

The campaign launched its first series of songwriting workshops in Cebu's educational institutions, including St. Theresa's College, Don Bosco Technical College, University of Southern Philippines Foundation and University of San Carlos, while at the same time inviting submission of entries for the competition.

== Competition ==
The Vispop music festival is open to all Filipinos. Songs to be submitted as entries must be written in Cebuano language; colloquialism is allowed, and Tagalog or English may also be used. Entries should be no more than 4 minutes and 30 seconds in length, including the introduction and fade-out. Six finalists will be chosen to be presented during the awards night, where three songs will be awarded the top prizes.

== 1st Visayan Pop Music Festival ==
The 1st Visayan Pop Music Festival was held at the Benedicto College Artists Hall on May 18, 2013. The entries were judged by songwriter Gary Granada, Department of Trade and Industry regional director Nelia Navarro, and singer Anna Fegi. Out of 80 entries. The following were adjudged winners:

- Grand prize: Duyog by siblings Jewel and Joe Villaflores
- Second runner-up: Laylay by Lourdes Maglinte
- Third runner-up: Balay ni Mayang by Kyle Wong and Marianne Dungog

The following songs were the other finalists:

- Hinaut by Paterno Niñal
- Historias by Alphecca Perpetua
- Pa-Pictura Ko Nimo, Gwapo by Marie Maureen Salvaleon

== Vispop 2.0 ==
The 2014 edition of the competition was re-branded Vispop 2.0 and was held at SM Cebu Cinema One on June 24. The judges were musician and TV host Errol "Budoy" Marabiles, Eping Amores, and MOR 97.1 DJ Jacky G.The grand prize second runner-up, and third runner-up winners won Php 30,000, Php 20,000, and Php 10,000 respectively.

- Grand prize: Labyu Langga by Jerika Salve Teodorico. It also won the MOR 97.1 Listeners' Choice Awards and Super Song Award.
- Second runner-up: Kasikas by Johnever Canlom
- Third runner-up: Dili Pa Panahon by Kenneth Corvera. The song also received the Pinaka-Fighter Vispop Award.

The following songs made it to the final 6:

- Intergalactic Gugma by Kaye and Keith Jonas Dinauto
- Imong Bayani by Michael Vincent Tuico
- Habak by Gasser Perez

== Vispop 3.0 ==
Vispop 3.0 attracted 220 entries and was held at SM City Cinema One on June 26, 2015. Judges Eva Santos, Mandaue Children's Choir choirmaster Dennis Gregory Sugarol, and vocalist-columnist Luis Quibranza III judged during the awards night.

- Grand prize: Buwag Balik by Lourdes May Maglinte
- Second runner-up: Pangandoy by Irving Ladanan Guazon and John Stephen Cadelina. Singer Daryl Leong won Best Interpreter.
- Third runner-up: Bok Love by Therese Marie Villarante and Felipe Anjelo Calinawan. It also won the Netizen's Choice Award and MOR Listener's Choice Award.

The following songs made it to the final 6:

- Tug Ta Tug by Jerry Angelo Catarata and Earnest Hope Tinambacan
- Brgy. Blues by Andy Calope
- LQ (Sige La’g Away) by Adam Niel Corvera

== Vispop 4.0 ==
Vispop 4.0 was held at SM Seaside City’s Centerstage on June 20, 2016 and gathered over 360 entries. APO Hiking Society's Jim Paredes and musician Rico Blanco were guest of honors during the awards night that hailed the following winners:

- Grand prize: Paghunas by Joseph Gara
- Second runner-up: PepPep by Kenneth Corvera
- Third runner-up: Suwat ni Maria by Marie Salvaleon

The following songs made it to the final 6:

- Damgo by John Cadeliña and Irving Guazon
- Imoha Ra Akong Kasingkasing by Sherwin Fugoso and Marajane Monton. It also won the MOR Listener's Choice Award and Netizen's Choice Award.
- Baklay by Jerika Salve Teodorico

== Vispop 5.0 ==
With over 350 entries, Vispop 5.0 was held at the SMX Skyhall, SM Seaside Cebu in 2017 with the following announced as winners:

- Kung Di Pa Lang Ko Buang by Chai Fonacier
- Kung Di Man Gani Kita by Jerika Salve Teodorico
- Kurog Ko by Jeremy Sarmiento. It also won the BaiTV Netizen's Choice Award and MOR 97.1 Listeners’ Choice Award.

The following songs made it to the final 6:

- Unsa Ning Tamaa by RJ Ensalada
- Siya Ra Tawn Ang Nahigugma by Winset Jacot and Jane Abaday
- Hulagway by Dexter Latosa and Ma. Rhodora Veloso

== Vispop 2019 ==
=== Launching ===
The Vispop 2019 was launched by Artist Ko in partnership with the Sacred Heart School for Boys - Batch 1985 Foundation on February 27, 2019. A new organizing committee was also announced: Missing Filemon's Insoy Niñal, Jojo Lopez, Barney Borja, and Kenneth Cobonpue.

=== Co-founder's concerns ===
The Vispop songwriting competition was not staged in 2018 due to various concerns. When Vispop 2019 was launched, Gitamondoc disclosed on his Facebook page that he already left ArtistKo and his affiliation with the competition a year earlier, citing differences of opinion, raising questions on ArtistKo's management on revenue and distribution, and the creation of "Vispop" as a trademark without his knowledge. An application for Vispop's trademark was approved by the Intellectual Property Office of the Philippines in 2015. Artist Ko stated that establishing the trademark was made to widen the campaign's reach and the cooperative reached out to the concerned parties regarding royalties. Borja, Vispop 2019 project chairman, on the other hand said that the organizers acknowledged Gitamondoc's contribution and the legacy of all founders.

Local artists Kurt Fick, Therese Villarante, and Vispop 2.0 grand prize winner Jerika Teodorico were among those who issued a joint statement clarifying their non-involvement with the Vispop 2019 and its organizers. On April 8, 2019, Sacred Heart School for Boys - Batch 1985 Foundation announced that Vispop 2019 would no longer push through.

== Vispop X ==
After five years, the music fest-competition was restaged as Vispop X.

- Grand prize: Para Natong Duha by Keith John Quito (interpreter: Joseph Gara)
- Second Runner up: Hawid by John Erscel. The song was given the Warner's Music Philippines Choice Award and Erscel was recognized as Best Interpreter.
- Third Runner up: Bangon Adlaw by Ferdinand Aragon

The following songs made it to the final 6:

- Isayaw Tika by Mary Anchit, which also won FILSCAP Choice Award
- Da Vao by Kent Charcos, which won People's Choice Award
- My Baleleng by written by Paolo Olvido and Nazareth Actub (interpreter: Mic Kindica)

Special guests of the event were Jacky Chang, James Gulles, Jerika Teodorico, Jewel Villaflores, Kurt Fick, Medyo Maldito, Morissette, and Oh! Caraga.

== Reception ==
The winning songs from the competition made it to several radio station's hit song countdowns. 1st Visayan Pop Music Festival grand prize winner Duyog was part of the MOR 97.1 Cebu's Epic Top 20 Countdown for 23 weeks, while third runner-up Balay ni Mayang was No. 3 MOR 91.9 CDO BIGA10 Hits Daily, No. 6 Bay Radio 104.7 FM Batangas' 20 Hit Combo, No. 17 94.9 KOOL FM Cotabato's Cool Top 30, No. 16 MOR 101.5 Bacolod's Weekly Top 20 Countdown, No. 2 MOR 97.1 Cebu's The Epic Top 20 Countdown, and No. 3 MOR 101.9 Manila MOR's BIGA-10.

SunStar Cebu's August 28, 2017 editorial acknowledged its success, writing, "The nongovernment organization ArtistKo initiated Vispop, a successful campaign encouraging Visayans to compose and patronize Visayan songs distinguished by superior quality and expression of ideas that resonate with the current generation." Patricia May Catan of SunStar Weekend wrote, "Through the efforts of ArtistKo with the strong support of Filscap, Vispop has been giving dreamers a platform to showcase their craft. And not only has it provided them a stage, Vispop also paved the way for Visayan pop to be recognized and listened to in different parts of the country and, perhaps, in the international podium." Marian Z. Codilla, in her article on Cebu Daily News, also praised the campaign, stating, "This welcome trend has encouraged more Visayan songwriters to come out with more material and make us Visayans feel proud about our musical heritage." Karla Rule of The Freeman also wrote, "In their last staging in 2017, Vispop’s music evolved into a spectrum boasting catchy, easy, friendly tunes as well as profound, intricate pieces of longing, frustration, joy and other complex themes that entered the Filipino music scene’s consciousness."

== Genre ==
Vispop, or sometimes Visayan pop, later on evolved from being associated with the music festival to a genre for the new wave of Visayan pop songs that gained nationwide popularity, even those songs that were not exclusively produced for or presented in the contest. The independent media company Rappler published an inclusive list of songs that included Bisrock, independently produced songs, and the contest winner Duyog as introductory playlist to the genre. Furthermore, Philippine Airlines' magazine Mabuhay and GMA's TV show Bawal ang Pasaway with host Solita "Winnie" Monsod considered the popular Hahahahasula, an independently produced single, as one of the biggest Vispop hit songs.

== See also ==
- Jude Gitamondoc
- Cebu Popular Music Festival
