= DXVC-TV =

PTV-7 Zamboanga (DXVC-TV)

Zamboanga City; Philippines
- Channels: Analog: 7 (VHF)
- Branding: PTV-7 Zamboanga; La Televisora Nacional en las Nuevas Filipinas

Programming
- Affiliations: PTV

Ownership
- Owner: People's Television Network, Inc.
- Sister stations: DXMR (Presidential Broadcast Service)

History
- Founded: 1961
- Former affiliations: GMA Network (1961-1976)
- Call sign meaning: From "Chavacano"

Technical information
- Licensing authority: NTC
- Power: 5,000 watts

Links
- Website: www.ptni.gov.ph

DXVC-TV, channel 7, is a relay television station of Philippine television network People's Television Network. Its transmitter and broadcast facility are located at Muruk, Upper Pasonanca, Brgy. Pasonanca, Zamboanga City.

Currently, PTV 7 Zamboanga is back on-air on analog while online on digital TV via eMedia affiliate subchannel.

== History ==
- 1961 - DXVC-TV channel 7 was an affiliate station of GMA Network, which started as the Republic Broadcasting System.
- 1976 - DXVC-TV channel 7 became an owned-and-operated station of the National Media Production Center as Government Television (GTV) under Lito Gorospe and later by then-Press Secretary Francisco Tatad, with GMA programming moving to Channel 3.
- 1980 - GTV later became Maharlika Broadcasting System (MBS).
- February 24, 1986 - following the People Power Revolution on which it was taken over by pro-Corazon Aquino, MBS was renamed People's Television (PTV).
- 1992 - President Cory Aquino signed Republic Act 7306 turning PTV Network into a government corporation known formally as People's Television Network, Inc. (PTNI).
- July 16, 2001 - under the new management appointed by President Gloria Macapagal Arroyo, PTNI adopted the name National Broadcasting Network (NBN) carrying new slogan "One People. One Nation. One Vision." for a new image in line with its new programming thrusts, they continued the new name until the Aquino administration in 2010.
- October 6, 2011 - People's Television Network, Inc. (PTNI) became a primary brand and the branding National Broadcasting Network was retired. However, after it was lasted for forty years in Zamboanga, the station suddenly went off the air needed to upgrade its facilities.
- July 20, 2019 - PTV-7 Zamboanga resumes its relay (satellite-selling) operation, with the brand new 5,000-watt transmitter and broadcast facility located on Muruk, Upper Pasonanca, Brgy. Pasonanca, Zamboanga City.

== See also ==
- People's Television Network
- List of People's Television Network stations and channels
- DWGT-TV - the network's flagship station in Manila.
- DXMR
