= PTV 4 =

PTV 4 (formerly GTV 4, MBS 4 and NBN 4) may refer to:

- People's Television Network, a Philippine state-operated television network
- Four PTV Regional stations broadcasting on channel 4, including:
  - DWGT-TV, Manila (PTV's flagship TV station)
  - DWMA-TV, Naga
