= D-10-YM-TV =

PTV-10 Dumaguete (D-10-YM-TV)
- Dumaguete; Philippines
- Channels: Analog: 10 (VHF)

Programming
- Network: PTV

Ownership
- Owner: People's Television Network, Inc.

History
- Founded: 1992

Technical information
- Licensing authority: NTC
- Power: 5,000 watts

Links
- Website: www.ptni.gov.ph

D-10-YM-TV, channel 10, is a relay television station of Philippine television network People's Television Network. Its transmitter are located at Gov. Mariano F. Perdices Memorial Stadium, Capitol Compound, Dumaguete.

== History ==
- 1992 - PTV begin its broadcasts in Dumaguete, which became part of People's Television Network, Inc. (PTNI).
- July 16, 2001 - Under the new management appointed by President Gloria Macapagal Arroyo, PTNI adopted the name National Broadcasting Network (NBN) carrying new slogan "One People. One Nation. One Vision." for a new image in line with its new programming thrusts, they continued the new name until the Aquino administration in 2010.
- 2011 - After it was lasted for 19 years in Dumaguete, the station suddenly went off the air needed to upgraded its facilities.
- 2015 - PTV-10 Dumaguete resumes its relay station operations, with the 5,000-watt transmitter located at Gov. Mariano F. Perdices Memorial Stadium, Capitol Compound, Dumaguete.

== See also ==
- People's Television Network
- List of People's Television Network stations and channels
- DWGT-TV - the network's flagship station in Manila.
