= Al-Ahed (newspaper) =

Hezbollah-owned newspaper

Al-Ahed العهد
- Type: Weekly newspaper
- Format: Print, online
- Owner(s): Hezbollah (Lebanese Communication Group)
- Founded: June 18 1984
- Language: Arabic
- Headquarters: Beirut
- Website: english.alahednews.com.lb

Al-Ahed (Arabic:العهد) is a weekly newspaper and a news website based in Beirut, Lebanon. Al-Ahed is owned by Hezbollah. The newspaper was established with the aim of presenting Hezbollah's narratives and perspectives among the Lebanese and Arab public. It deals with a variety of topics, including news, commentary, interviews, and documentaries, with a focus on issues related to Lebanon's foreign policy, the Israeli–Palestinian conflict, Hezbollah activity, and events in the Middle East. The website is available in Arabic, English, French, and Spanish languages. The newspaper was first published in June 18 1984, and the internet edition was started in November 5 1999.

== See also ==
- Hezbollah
- Al-Manar
- Al-Nour
