= DYPT-TV =

- Metro Cebu; Philippines
- City: Cebu City
- Channels: Analog: 11 (VHF); Digital: 42 (UHF) (ISDB-T) (test broadcast); Virtual: 4.01
- Branding: PTV-11 Cebu; PTV-11 Central Visayas

Programming
- Affiliations: 4.01: PTV; 4.02: PTV Sports; 4.03: EBU Color Bars

Ownership
- Owner: People's Television Network, Inc.

History
- Founded: September 11, 1963
- Former call signs: DYMT-TV (1963-1972); DYCW-TV (1973-1986); As GTV/MBS: DYCB-TV (1978-1988)
- Former channel numbers: As GTV/MBS: 3 (1978-1988)
- Former affiliations: Associated Broadcasting Corporation (1963-1972); BBC (1973-1986)
- Call sign meaning: "People's Television"

Technical information
- Licensing authority: NTC
- Power: Analog: 10 kW; Digital: 2.5 kW
- ERP: Analog: 30 kW
- Transmitter coordinates: 10°21′50.6″N 123°51′17.4″E

Links
- Website: www.ptni.gov.ph ptv11cebu.weebly.com

DYPT-TV (channel 11) is a television station in Metro Cebu, Philippines, serving as the Visayas flagship of the government-owned People's Television Network. The station maintains hybrid analog/digital transmitting facility at Sitio Babag, Brgy. Busay, Cebu City.

The station is currently planning to upgrade to an originating station in the future after the Visayas Media Hub in Mandaue City will be completed in 2025.

== History ==
- September 11, 1963 - PTV began its broadcasts in Cebu via Channel 11, a frequency originally owned by Associated Broadcasting Corporation (now TV5 Network, Inc.), with the call sign DYMT-TV until President of the Philippines Ferdinand Marcos declared Martial Law on September 21, 1972.
- February 2, 1974 - During the Martial Law era, the station reopened as DYGT-TV and became an owned-and-operated station of the National Media Production Center as Government Television (GTV) under Lito Gorospe and later by then-Press Secretary Francisco Tatad. It was the first television station in Central Visayas.
- 1978 - DYGT-TV switched affiliation to Banahaw Broadcasting Corporation, with its new call sign DYCW-TV. On the same year, GTV was transferred to Channel 3 under the call sign DYCB-TV, then was renamed Maharlika Broadcasting System (MBS) in 1980.
- February 24, 1986 - The station was officially rebranded as People's Television (PTV).
- 1988 - PTV returned to Channel 11, with Channel 3 being taken over by ABS-CBN. Its call letters were changed to DYPT-TV. Back then, its studios were located at the former NMPC Bldg. along A.C. Cortes Ave., Mandaue (demolished in 2011).
- January 15, 2011 - The station suddenly went off the air for facility upgrades.
- August 29, 2015 - After 4 years of being silent in the area, PTV-11 Cebu resumed its operations, with the 10,000-watt brand new transmitter from the Advanced Broadcasting Electronics (ABE) Elettronica of Italy, complemented by a 250-foot tower in Sitio Babag, Brgy. Busay, Cebu City, coinciding with the conduct of the APEC Summit in the city.
- June 1, 2018 - PTV Cebu started its ISDB-T digital test broadcasts on UHF Channel 42.
- December 16, 2021 - PTV Cebu went off the air for the second time following the effects of Typhoon "Rai" (Odette) in Cebu, Bohol, and Leyte, causing the transmitter was struck brought by the said typhoon.
- January 2022 - The station returned on-air once again after power was restored in Brgy. Babag.

== Digital television ==
=== Digital channels ===
DYPT-TV broadcast its digital signal on UHF Channel 42 (641.143 MHz) and is multiplexed into the following subchannels:

Channel	Video	Aspect	Short name	Programming	Note
4.01	480i	16:9	PTV	PTV Cebu (Main DYPT-TV programming)	Test Broadcast (2.5 kW)
4.02	480i	16:9	PTV SPORTS	PTV Sports	Test Broadcast (2.5 kW)
4.03	480i	16:9	PTV SD3	(EBU Color Bars)	Test Broadcast (2.5 kW)
4.04	240p	4:3	PTV 1seg	PTV	1seg

== Areas of coverage ==
=== Primary areas ===
- Cebu City
- Cebu

=== Secondary areas ===
- Portion of Bohol
- Portion of Leyte

== See also ==
- People's Television Network
- List of People's Television Network stations and channels
- DWGT-TV - the network's flagship station in Manila.
- DYMR
