= List of television and radio stations in Naga, Camarines Sur =

The following is a list of notable television and radio stations broadcasting in Naga City in Camarines Sur province in the Republic of the Philippines.

== TV stations ==
=== Analog ===
- Channel 2: TV5 Naga (Bicol Broadcasting System)
- Channel 4: PTV Naga (formerly from Channel 8)
- Channel 7: GMA Naga
- Channel 10: RPN / RPTV Iriga
- Channel 11: All TV (Advanced Media Broadcasting System)
- Channel 22: TV5 (Nation Broadcasting Corporation)
- Channel 28: GTV (GMA Network Inc.)

=== Digital ===
- Channel 17 (491.143 MHz): Intercontinental Broadcasting Corporation
- Channel 32 (599.143 MHz): Broadcast Enterprises and Affiliated Media
- Channel 38 (617.143 MHz): GMA Bicol
- Channel 46 (665.143 MHz): People's Television Network
- Channel 47 (671.143 MHz): Eagle Broadcasting Corporation
- Channel 48 (677.143 MHz): Golden Nation Network

=== Defunct/inactive ===
- Channel 2: BBS TV Naga
- Channel 5: PBN Naga
- Channel 11: ABS-CBN Naga
- Channel 13: IBC Naga
- Channel 24: ABS-CBN Sports and Action, AMCARA Broadcasting Network (blocktime agreement from ABS-CBN Corporation)
- Channel 32: Broadcast Enterprises and Affiliated Media
- Channel 40: One PH (Mediascape, Inc. (Cignal TV)
- Channel 48: Golden Nation Network

== Radio stations ==
- DWRB Radyo Pilipinas Naga 549

== News programs ==
- Balitang Bicolandia (GMA Bicol)
- TV Patrol Bicol (ABS-CBN Naga)
