= LCG =

LCG may refer to:

== Arts and entertainment ==
- The League of Crafty Guitarists, a performance ensemble
- Living Card Game, a variant of collectible card game

== Businesses and organisations ==
- LCG Entertainment, Inc., the legal name of Telltale Games (2018–present)
- Lebanese Communication Group, parent company of Al Manar
- Living Church of God, a U.S. church
- London Computer Group, now the British Computer Society
- Libyan Coast Guard, a coast guard in the Mediterranean Sea

== Places ==
- A Coruña Airport, Spain (IATA code: LCG)
- Lochgelly railway station, Scotland (GBR code: LCG)
- Lord's Cricket Ground, a stadium in London, England

== Science, technology and mathematics ==
- Landing Craft Gun, a craft adapted to carry guns in amphibious operations
- LHC Computing Grid, a computing project for the Large Hadron Collider
- Linear congruential generator, in mathematics, a type of pseudorandom number generator algorithm
- Liquid Cooling Garment, a component of space suits
- London Computer Group, now the British Computer Society
