= DYDY-TV =

DYDY-TV (PTV-2 Guimaras)
- Guimaras; Philippines
- Channels: Analog: 2 (VHF); Digital: 23 (UHF) (ISDB-T); Virtual: 4.01
- Branding: PTV-2 Guimaras

Programming
- Subchannels: See list
- Affiliations: 4.01: PTV; 4.02: Congress TV; 4.03: PTV Sports

Ownership
- Owner: People's Television Network, Inc.

History
- Founded: 1972
- Former call signs: DYYB-TV (1972-2015); DYAQ-TV (1974-1992)
- Former channel number: 3 (1974-1992)
- Former affiliations: KBS/RPN/New Vision 9 (1972-1995)

Technical information
- Licensing authority: NTC
- Power: Analog: 5,000 watts; Digital: 1,000 watts
- Transmitter coordinates: 10°35′54″N 122°34′57″E

Links
- Website: www.ptni.gov.ph

DYDY-TV, channel 2, is a relay television station of Philippine-government owned television network People's Television Network. Its transmitter is located at Brgy. San Miguel, Jordan, Guimaras.

== History ==
- 1972 - DYDY-TV began broadcasting on Channel 2 under the Kanlaon Broadcasting System.
- 1975 - KBS was formally rebranded as the Radio Philippines Network (RPN), using the acronym derived from its franchise name.
- 1995 - DYDY-TV became an owned-and-operated station of the People's Television Network, Inc. (PTNI).
- July 16, 2001 - Under new management appointed by then President Gloria Macapagal Arroyo, PTNI was renamed the National Broadcasting Network (NBN). The network adopted the slogan “One People. One Nation. One Vision”, as part of an effort to establish a new corporate identity and programming direction. The NBN name remained in use until 2010, during the administration of President Benigno Aquino III.
- 2011 - After approximately 16 years of operation in Iloilo, the station ceased analog transmission
- October 2015 - PTV-2 Guimaras resumed relay operations following a four-year absence. A new 5-kilowatt transmitter was installed at Barangay San Miguel in Jordan, Guimaras, providing coverage to the Metro Iloilo–Guimaras area.
- May 13, 2021 - PTV 2 Guimaras commenced digital test broadcasts on UHF Channel 23.

== Digital television ==
=== Digital channels ===
UHF Channel 23 (527.143 MHz)

| Channel | Video | Aspect | Short name | Programming | Note |
|---|---|---|---|---|---|
| 4.01 | 1080i | 16:9 | PTV | PTV Guimaras (Main DYDY-TV programming) | Test Broadcast |
| 4.02 | 480i | 16:9 | CONGRESS TV | Congress TV | Test Broadcast |
| 4.03 | 480i | 16:9 | PTV SPORTS | PTV Sports | Test Broadcast |
| 4.04 | 240p | 4:3 | PTV 1seg | Black Screen | 1seg |

== Areas of coverage ==
=== Primary areas ===
- Iloilo
- Guimaras

==== Secondary areas ====
- Bacolod
- Portion of Negros Occidental

== See also ==
- People's Television Network
- List of People's Television Network stations and channels
- DWGT-TV - the network's flagship station in Manila.
