= Al-Manar =

Lebanese television station affiliated with Hezbollah

- Logo used since 2016
- Type: Satellite television network
- Country: Lebanon
- Availability: Middle East; Europe; Asia; Africa; America; Webcast
- Motto: Station of the resistance
- Headquarters: Haret Hreik, Beirut
- Owner: Hezbollah (Lebanese Communication Group)
- Key people: Nasser Akhdar (director of programming); Abdallah Kassir (CEO)
- Launch date: 4 June 1991; 35 years ago
- Picture format: 4:3 (576i · SDTV)
- Official website: english.almanar.com.lb

Al-Manar (Arabic: المنار, romanized: al-Manār, lit. ''The Lighthouse'') is a Lebanese satellite television station owned and operated by the Lebanese Shia Islamist political party and paramilitary group Hezbollah, broadcasting from Beirut, Lebanon. The channel was launched on 4 June 1991 as a terrestrial channel and in 2000 as a satellite channel. It is a member of the Arab States Broadcasting Union. The station reaches around 50 million people.

The station is considered one of Hezbollah's most important global propaganda tools, with the Danish Institute for International Studies describing it as "the very centrepiece of the entire [Hezbollah] media apparatus".

It is banned in the United States, France, Spain, and Germany, and has run into some service and license problems outside Lebanon, making it unavailable in the Netherlands, Canada, and Australia.

According to the RAND Corporation in 2017, "Al-Manar has an annual budget of roughly $15 million, much of it supplied by wealthy expatriate Lebanese donors and various Iranian community organizations, and income from the sale of its shows."

== History ==
Al-Manar first began terrestrial broadcasting from Beirut, Lebanon on 4 June 1991. The station was located in Haret Hreik in the southern suburbs of Beirut, close to Hezbollah's headquarters. Originally, the station had only a few employees, who had studied media in London during the mid-1980s. But almost a year later, Al-Manar was employing over 150 people.

Initially, Al Manar would broadcast five hours per day. Shortly before the 1992 election, it began broadcasting regular news bulletins in order to help Hezbollah attain more votes and spread its message to more people. In 1993, the station expanded its broadcasting to seven hours a day and extended its signal to the southern part of the Bekaa Valley. Ahead of the 1996 Lebanese parliamentary elections, additional antennas were erected in Northern Lebanon and throughout the Mount Lebanon range, so that the station could be viewed not only in Lebanon, but also in western Syria and northern Israel. Broadcasting was extended to 20 hours in 1998 but reduced to 18 hours in 2000 and 24 in 2001.

In 1996, the Lebanese government granted broadcasting licenses to five television stations, not including Al-Manar. Approximately 50 stations were forced to close at the time. Several stations appealed the government's decision, but only four of them were finally granted licenses, one of which was Al-Manar. On 18 September, the Lebanese Cabinet decided to grant Al-Manar a license after having been requested to do so by then Syrian president Hafez al-Assad. Al-Manar received the license in July 1997.

It started in this period to embed journalists with Hezbollah fighters, showing video of Israeli casualties, and including Hebrew so Israeli viewers could follow, with the aim of sowing fear among Israeli viewers.

The station's website was launched in 1999, at first hosting some recordings of Hassan Nasrallah speeches to a background of religious and nationalist music.

On 24–25 June 1999 the IAF launched two massive air raids across Lebanon. One of the targets was the al-Manar radio station's offices in a four-storey building in Baalbek which was completely demolished. The attacks also hit Beirut's power stations and bridges on the roads to the south. An estimated $52 million damage was caused. Eleven Lebanese were killed as well as two Israelis in Kiryat Shmona.

=== Satellite broadcasting ===
During the 1990s, the popularity of satellite broadcasting greatly increased in the Arab world and in Lebanon. The first Lebanese station to use this technology was Future Television, launching Future International SAT in 1994, while LBCI and the Lebanese government followed by launching LBCSAT and Tele Liban Satellite respectively. In order to compete with these emerging stations, and in order to find an international audience, Al-Manar announced its intention to launch a satellite channel on 9 March 2000. Muhammad Ra'd, a Hezbollah member of parliament and al-Manar's largest shareholder, submitted the request to the minister of transmission, which was approved in April 2000. Although the launch of the satellite station was originally planned for July, the date was moved up in order to coincide with the end of the Israeli occupation of South Lebanon on 25 May. This success led other television stations to follow in launching satellite stations, including Murr TV in November 2000, but it was shut down for "violating an election law prohibiting propaganda" – a fate which al-Manar did not meet, although its programming was also considered propaganda by many analysts. ArabSat, a leading communications satellite operator in the Middle East, headquartered in Riyadh, Saudi Arabia, was at first wary about collaborating with al-Manar, because of the station's Shi'a agenda – the two companies agreed, however, that the programming would be adapted to the pan-Arab audience, leading to a slight difference between the local broadcast and the one via satellite. At first, only three hours of satellite programming were broadcast per day, but by December 2000, the station was broadcasting around the clock.

The timing of the satellite launch - covering the Israeli withdrawal and also the start of the Second Intifada - boosted its audience in the Arab world.

Al-Manar was soon carried by many satellite providers. However, starting with the removal of the station from TARBS World TV in Australia in 2003, many satellite television providers stopped featuring it. Until then the station was featured by the following providers at one time or another:

- Intelsat, broadcasting to North America
- New Skies Satellites NSS-803, Africa and parts of Europe
- ArabSat, Middle East, North Africa, and parts of Europe, Saudi-owned
- Hispasat, South America
- AsiaSat, Asia
- Nilesat, part-owned by the Egyptian government
- Eutelsat, Europe, North Africa, and Middle East
- SES Astra, Europe

According to the BBC on 26 July 2006, Al-Manar had three satellite signals:

- ArabSat 2B at 30.5 degrees east
- Badr 3 at 26 degrees east
- NileSat 102 at 7 degrees west

By 2004, Al Manar was estimated to hold 10-15 million viewers daily worldwide.

=== 2000s: Israeli attacks and global growth ===
The station's website team expanded in 2004, from four members to thirteen.

During the 2006 Lebanon War, the channel was continuously struck by missiles during Israeli air raids. The Israeli Air Force attacks on 13 July 2006 led to injury of three employees. The attack on Al-Manar's facilities shortly followed another strike against the Rafic Hariri International Airport in Beirut earlier that morning. Despite the attack, the station remained on air, broadcasting from undisclosed locations. The IDF bombed Al-Manar's Beirut complex again on 16 July causing fire in the complex and surrounding buildings. The station's signal disappeared briefly several times, then continued normal programming.

Human Rights Watch said the bombing of media outlets violates international law when they are not being used for military purposes ("it is unlawful to attack facilities that merely shape civilian opinion; neither directly contributes to military operations"). The incident was condemned by the International Federation of Journalists. The Israel Association of Journalists withdrew from the federation in response, claiming that Al-Manar employees "are not journalists, they are terrorists". The New York based Committee to Protect Journalists, also expressed alarm over the incident as "it (Al-Manar) does not appear based on a monitoring of its broadcasts today to be serving any discernible military function, according to CPJ's analysis."

The Israeli bombing increased the station's popularity:

With other channels turning to Al Manar for the latest line from Hizbullah, it could set the regional news agenda and bring viewers to its extensive coverage of the war. Indeed, purely by staying on air, Al Manar could claim a success. According to Israel's Market Research, the channel's popularity rankings in the Middle East leapt from 83rd to the 10th slot between July 15 and 28. This meant a substantial increase to the estimated 10 million people that tune in daily to its terrestrial and satellite channels in normal times.

In 2006, it began to broadcast online to complement its terrestrial and satellite output. By 2008, its website was hosting 100 new items a day, and reaching over 26,000 daily viewers, and as many as 55,000 according to its management. By the end of the 2000s, as well as TV broadcasts in Arabic, Hebrew, French and English, the station's website was available in Spanish as well.

As a result of removal from some satellite services in the 2000s, it signed new deals with smaller satellite providers, e.g. in April 2008 with Indosat, the operator of the Palapa C2 satellite owned by Telkom Indonesia, in which the Indonesian government is the majority shareholder. By 2009, al-Manar was watched by some 18 million people globally. By 2010, its annual budget was $10 million.

=== 2013 Bahrain crisis ===
Iranian-backed Shia groups were involved in demonstrations starting in mid-2011 (as part of the "Arab Spring") against Bahrain's ruling Sunni oligarchy, and al-Manar backed these demonstrations and condemned the government repression of them. In late December 2013, the Lebanese Communication Group that includes Al-Manar apologised for its partisan coverage of the events at a meeting of the Arab States Broadcasting Union. In response, Hezbollah forced the Director General of the station, Abdallah Qasir or Kassir (a former MP of Hezbollah's Loyalty to the Resistance parliamentary bloc), to resign. He went to Iran.

=== 2020s ===
According to Orayb Aref Najjar, following the U.S. assassination of Qasem Soleimani, leader of Iran's Islamic Revolutionary Guard Corps, on January 3, 2020, "Al-Manar went on a daily attack on U.S. policy on Iran and the region, promising revenge."

Al-Manar translates its content into Spanish for circulation in Latin America.

On 25 October 2023, as the 2023 Gaza war spread to southern Lebanon, Al-Manar reported that its camera operator, Wissam Qassim, was killed in an Israeli airstrike on Hasbaya, southern Lebanon, alongside two employees of allied website Al Mayadeen, while they slept in chalets used by journalists. The station's studios in Dahiyeh, southern Beirut, were hit in Israeli airstrikes in early October 2024. They were struck again in Israeli airstrikes on 3 March 2026.

On 28 March 2026, Ali Shoeib, a journalist for Al-Manar, was killed in a targeted Israeli airstrike in southern Lebanon. The IDF stated that Shoeib had been exposing Israeli military positions and described him as a member of Hezbollah's Radwan Force, its special operations unit.

== Content ==
Al-Manar's programming is diverse, including music shows, children's programmes and news. The Washington Post, said in 2004 that "It heavily covers events involving the Palestinians, and it shows militants setting off explosives and shooting at Israelis and American troops, often to musical accompaniment." Citing the Washington Institute for Near East Policy, the Post said it often features Islamic sacred texts and images of martyrdom. According to the Washington Institute's 2004 analysis, it consists of 25% music videos and fillers, 25% series and dramas, 25% talk shows, and finally 25% news and family shows. A 2007 analysis described 65% of its content as entertainment and 35% as political.

=== Programs ===
The news programming includes much footage from the international press. Additionally, as of early 2004, the station subscribed to wire services including Reuters, Associated Press (AP), Agence France Presse, and Deutsche Presse Agentur. As of 2004, the station airs eight news bulletins a day in Arabic in addition to one in English and one in French. AP severed ties with the station shortly after this.

Al-Manar primarily uses Iranian and Syrian government news agencies for news and documentaries. It has had a formal co-operation agreement with IRNA since 2012. On its websites it also republishes material verbatim from Russia's state broadcaster RT. It extensively screens Iranian films (which it sees as "culturally in harmony with Arab values and Al Manar's mostly Shiite audience") and television series including soap operas, dubbed into (and later more often subtitled in) Modern Standard Arabic, as well as Syrian series.

Several talk shows are regularly aired on al-Manar. According to Avi Jorisch of the Foundation for Defense of Democracies, the best known of these is Beit al-ankabut (The Spider's House); its title alludes to a metaphor, Hezbollah leader Hassan Nasrallah often employs to describe Israel. It is dedicated to uncovering the "weakness of the Zionist entity", i.e. Israel, and attempts to convince the Arab world that Israel could easily be destroyed, for example, by an increase in the Arab population. Further talk shows include Hadith al-sa'a (Talk of the Hour), Matha ba'ad (What's Next?), Ma'al Hadath (With The Event), Bayna Kawsayn (Between The Brackets), Milafat (Files), Al-din wa al-hayat (Religion and Life), and Nun wa al-qalam (The 'Nun' and the Pen). Guests include well-known journalists, analysts, writers, Lebanese politicians, spokespersons of terrorist groups, and Islamic scholars, who discuss current religious, political, cultural, regional, and global issues.

Al-Manar often airs music videos and fillers in between full-length programs and during commercial breaks. Much of the music praises Hezbollah and its martyrs or the Palestinian intifada. According to Jorisch, the music videos are generally dedicated to the following seven purposes: the promotion of the Hezbollah, highlighting the importance of armed resistance against Israel, the glorification of martyrdom, spreading of anti-Americanism, denunciation of Israel and Zionism as the embodiments of terrorism, the appeals for the destruction of Israel, and the depiction of the future of Arab youths. The videos are on average three minutes long. The videos are usually professionally produced by the station itself and each usually takes about three to four days to make. The filler material usually consists of appeals to donate money to the Hezbollah, lists of demonstrations taking place worldwide, and slogans in English, Hebrew, or Arabic.

The station also offers sports broadcasting such as the programs Goal and Tis'in daqiqa (Ninety Minutes), family programming such as Al-mustakshifoun al-judud (The New Explorers), Al-Muslimoun fi al-Sin (Muslims in China), and Ayday al-khayr (Hands of Benevolence), game shows including Al-mushahid shahid (The Viewer Is the Witness), where contestants attempt to guess the names of Israeli political and military figures, and Al-muhima (The Mission) - a game show in the style of Who Wants to Be a Millionaire but with questions on Arab and Islamic history and the victor winning a virtual trip to the Al-Aqsa Mosque in Jerusalem, and even a children's program called Al-manr al-saghir (The Little Manar), which is in the style of the US show Mr. Rogers' Neighborhood, targeting three- to seven-year-olds.

During Ramadan, al-Manar features special programs, many of which are self-produced. In 2001, Izz al-Din al-Qassam: Qisat al-jihad wa al-muqawama (Izz al-Din al-Qassam: A Story of Jihad and Resistance), a four-part drama based on the life of Izz al-Din al-Qassam, an early-twentieth-century Arab, after whom the Izz ad-Din al-Qassam Brigades are named. The 2002 program Faris bi la jawad (A Knight without a Horse orThe Horseless Rider), which was produced by an Egyptian, was based on The Protocols of the Elders of Zion, an old Russian antisemitic text claiming a conspiracy of Jews control the world. The 29-part series Ash-Shatat (The Diaspora), which was aired in 2003, was also based on The Protocols; Commissioned by Al-Manar and produced in Syria, its screening on the channel led to the banning of al-Manar in France.

The station archives the complete speeches of Hezbollah leader Hassan Nasrallah, and those of Iranian leader Ali Khamenei. It also promotes Hezbollah social services, for example showcasing public health initiatives.

== Stance ==
According to The SAGE Encyclopedia of Journalism, "Al-Manar does not claim neutrality but bills itself as partisan to the cause of its constituents, initially, the disadvantaged and poor Shi'ia of [Lebanon's] South and the Beka'a valley; later expanded to include the Arab and Islamic worlds." Its adopted slogan is "The channel for Arabs and Muslims". In 2001, the station's chair, Nayyef Krayyem, said "Al Manar is an important weapon for us. It's a political weapon, social weapon, and cultural weapon."

According to Jorisch, the station manager Mohammad Afif Ahmad (later Hezbollah's head of media), said in the 1990s that Al Manar belongs to Hezbollah culturally and politically. As of 2022, its former CEO, Abdallah Kassir, is now a member of Hezbollah's governing council.

According to Jorisch, writing in National Review in 2004, Al-Manar's programming adopts a strongly anti-Israel and anti-US point of view. Hezbollah Secretary General Hassan Nasrallah often "calls for 'Death to America'" on the channel. Additionally, the Statue of Liberty is depicted "as a ghoul, her gown dripping blood, a knife instead of a torch in her raised hand." According to Orayb Aref Najjar, this stance is reflected in the language used, for instance calling the Israel Defence Forces (IDF) the "Israeli Occupation Forces" (IOF).

Its Hot Topics section lists "The Israeli Enemy" as a search category. Al-Manar calls fighters Israel killed martyrs. Hezbollah fighters often leave archived video wills that explain why they chose martyrdom. The station also archives short video clips of family members or friends of martyrs praising their sacrifice and explaining why it benefits the country. The station glorified its martyrs on Martyr Day on November 11, 2019, with a speech by Secretary General Hassan Nasrallah, and in song and resistance videos.

According to German public television ARD in 2023, al-Manar broadcasts calls for the destruction of Israel, such as statements from Hamas. Hashem Safieddine, chairman of the Hezbollah Executive Council, used the channel to warn US President Joe Biden, Israel's Prime Minister President Netanyahu and the "evil Europeans" about his organization. Jeffrey Goldberg wrote in 2002 that the channel "broadcasts anti-American programming, but its main purpose is to encourage Palestinians to become suicide bombers", and ARD said in 2023 that some of its content glorifies suicide bombers, and this was also noted in some early reports about the channel; however, a 2006 analysis by the George C. Marshall European Center for Security Studies said that it was no longer screening this type of content.

Al-Manar was once described as one of the channels, among other complex reasons, of the spread of Shiism in Syria in the years before 2009. In a 2011 poll, 52% percent of Shia Lebanese identified Al Manar TV as their first choice for news, compared with only 4% of Sunnis and Druze and 1% of Christians.

The station is also closely aligned to Iran. In 2015, Asharq Al-Awsat reported that Nasser Akhdar, a senior manager at al-Manar, was part of a Houthi delegation in peace talks relating to the Yemeni civil war. A 2021 report by the International Institute for Counter-Terrorism (ICT), a conservative thinktank at Reichman University, noted that Farahat, now al-Manar CEO and a Hezbollah member is on the board of Tehran-based Islamic Radio and Television Union (IRTVU), described as a soft power operation for the Iranian state.

== Journalistic standards and restrictions ==
Interviewed by Jeffrey Goldberg in 2002, Al Manar's news director, Hassan Fadlallah, said that Al Manar does not aim to be neutral in its broadcasting, "Neutrality like that of Al Jazeera is out of the question for us," Fadlallah said. "We cover only the victim, not the aggressor. CNN is the Zionist news network, Al Jazeera is neutral, and Al Manar takes the side of the Palestinians...He said Al Manar's opposition to neutrality means that, unlike Al Jazeera, his station would never feature interviews or comments by Israeli officials. "We're not looking to interview Sharon," Fadlallah said. "We want to get close to him in order to kill him."

The Israeli government and its supporters have consequently lobbied Western governments to ban it, with Anti-Defamation League, CAMERA, the American Jewish Congress, the Foundation for the Defense of Democracies, American Israel Public Affairs Committee and the Middle East Media Research Institute all campaigning against it and taking credit for some successes in its deplatforming. Their campaigning led to corporations such as Pepsi removing their ads from the station in the mid-2000s, costing it an estimated $2 million in revenue.

=== Allegations of antisemitism and conspiracy theories ===
==== 9/11 Conspiracy theories ====
Al-Manar was one of the originators of the myth that Israelis stayed home from the World Trade Center on September 11 2001 due to foreknowledge of the attacks, publishing the story on 17 September.

==== Allegations of antisemitic programming ====
In the past, Al-Manar TV has aired material deemed antisemitic by Reporters Without Borders as well as Jewish groups, including content based on "The Protocols of the Elders of Zion". For example, on 23 November 2004 it transmitted a news programme in which someone presented as an expert on Zionism Al-Manar warned of "Zionist attempts" to transmit AIDS to Arab countries; in 2004 it screened a multi-episode Syrian series that included the blood libel and drew on the Protocols of the Elders of Zion. As a result, Jewish groups have campaigned about the station.

In 2004, the Conseil Représentatif des Institutions juives de France (Crif) complained to France's Conseil supérieur de l'audiovisuel (Higher Audio Visual Council, CSA) that scenes in the Syrian-made series, Al-Shatat (The Diaspora), which purported to depict the history of the Zionist movement, portrayed the killing of a Christian child by Jews to use the victim's blood. On 13 December 2004, the French Conseil d'État, the highest administrative court in France, ordered the French-based Eutelsat Satellite organisation (owner of Hot Bird 4, which had transmitted the station) to shut down Al-Manar broadcasts. Initially, Al-Manar defended Ash-Shatat as "purely factual", and said that the French response was political and not legal, influenced by Israel and Jewish lobbies. Later, however, "Al-Manar's management apologized for airing the series, dropped it, and explained that the station had purchased it without first viewing the entire series, according to Franklin Lamb [in CounterPunch]."

In 2002, Jeffrey Goldberg interviewed members of the station's staff and reported some of their comments about Jews. He quoted the news director, Hassan Fadlallah, as saying "Many Europeans believe that the Holocaust was a myth invented so that the Jews could get compensation. Everyone knows how the Jews punish people who seek the truth about the Holocaust." He quoted the director of English-language news, Ibrahim Mussawi, calling Jews "a lesion on the forehead of history."

==== Covid conspiracies ====
According to The Washington Institute for Near East Policy, al-Manar "condemned the United States for 'using' COVID-19 to 'undermine' its adversaries".

=== Restrictions ===
==== Restrictions in the US ====
Al-Manar was designated as a "Specially Designated Global Terrorist entity", and banned by the United States on 17 December 2004. A US government spokesman said the decision was taken because of "its incitement of terrorist activity", and that anybody linked to Al-Manar would be refused a visa to enter the US or if present in the US would be subject to expulsion procedures. Al-Manar was also removed from the satellite provider in the US, Intelsat, and Globecast, the TV service that hosted its US programming. Lebanon's ambassador to the United States, Farid Abboud, protested: "If you want simply to demonize or eliminate one side, you're not going to advance the issue. If you are going to focus on one side simply because of the political message, it's unacceptable and it's a grave breach of the freedom of speech.". Reporters without Borders opposed the designation, saying "Some of the anti-Semitic statements broadcast on Al-Manar are inexcusable but putting this TV station in the same category as terrorist groups worries us and does not strike us as the best solution". The decision was also opposed by the International Federation of Journalists, who called it political censorship, and by French academic and Holocaust denier Robert Faurisson.

In 2006, the US terrorist designation was extended to all Lebanon Media Group outlets, and its financial assets were frozen by the US Treasury. The Treasury said al-Manar had provided support to Palestinian groups defined as terrorist by the US government, including by transfer of tens of millions of dollars to a charity linked to Palestinian Islamic Jihad.

In May 2023, the US government sanctioned and took down a number of Hezbollah-related web domains, including that of Al-Manar TV, after Hezbollah was listed as a terrorist organization by the United States. Al Manar's Lebanese domain (.lb) remained accessible.

==== Broadcasting restrictions ====
In October 2003, the Australian Broadcasting Authority (ABA) launched an investigation into it, leading to Al-Manar's suspension from the Television and Radio Broadcasting Services PTY (TARBS). The investigation related to accusations that it "broadcast programs that are likely to incite or perpetuate hatred against or gratuitously vilify any person or group on the basis of their ethnicity, nationality, race or religion" and suspicions it might be in breach of Australian Federal anti-terrorism law. TARBS stopped broadcasting al-Manar on 5 November 2003, and went into receivership. In August 2009, Al-Manar received approval for broadcast by the Australian Communications and Media Authority.

In November 2004, after the controversy in France about Al-Manar's broadcast of Ash-Shatat, the Conseil supérieur de l'audiovisuel (CSA) entered into an agreement with the Lebanese Communication Group under which the channel would not air material that would not "respect the political, cultural and religious sensitivities of Europeans" and "not to broadcast programmes likely to cause problems with public order". Within days, the CSA deemed Al-Manar not to have met this, citing an interviewee accusing Israel of spreading AIDS in the Arab world in November 2004, and a clip "inciting violence" against Israel, leading to the removal of the channel from both Eustat and Arabsat. French officials also cited other broadcasts saying Jews "seek children's blood to bake into Passover matzoh." Other broadcasts cited by the CSA as racist incitement were "Flambeau sur la route de Jérusalem" and "Le Prince du paradis".

After the U.S. Department of State placed Al-Manar on the Terrorist Exclusion List in December 2004, transmissions to North America via Intelsat's satellites were blocked. Javed Iqbal, a resident of New York City, was the first person to charged under this law. He was charged by federal prosecutors with providing material support to a foreign terrorist organization by broadcasting Al Manar to American customers via his company HDTV, in exchange for thousands of dollars payment. In a 2008 plea bargain, he agreed to serve a prison term of up to 6 1/2 years. Saleh Elahwal, who also operated HDTV, was also charged and went on trial 5 January 2009. Donna Lieberman, executive director of the New York Civil Liberties Union, says it's constitutional for the government to outlaw businesses with direct operational ties to terrorist organizations, and media outlets that directly incite and direct violent action, but in this case, the government is trying to stop the spread of ideas. Mark Dubowitz, who founded the Coalition Against Terrorist Media in part to stop Al-Manar, said Al-Manar was "shouting fire in a crowded theater", although Lieberman disagreed with that metaphor.

The lack of transmission from Intelsat had the effect of making Al-Manar unavailable in Canada.

In 2005, the Dutch Media Authority "discovered that a satellite owned by New Skies Satellites was carrying Al-Manar and has ordered the company to stop doing so, because the channel did not have the required Dutch licence." Spanish authorities banned the retransmission of Al-Manar by Hispasat on 30 June 2005 (which effectively prevents its reception not only in the Iberian peninsula but also in South America). In August 2006, France Telecom's satellite provider Globecast removed the station from its Asiasat offer of channels.

It was banned in Germany in 2008.

In 2013, Bahrain blocked its website.

In 2015, Arabsat, a satellite operator majority-owned by Saudi Arabia, removed the station from its platform after Nasrallah blamed the Saudi government for a fatal stampede, at the hajj pilgrimage that year.

==== Internet and social media ====
The channel provides a live feed of its programming on the Internet through its website. This effectively circumvents the bans as Al-Manar is still available in all the areas it does not broadcast to via satellite.

Twitter removed its account in November 2019.

On 22 June 2021, the official Al-Manar website domain as well as dozens of other Arab news network domains related to Iran, Lebanon and Syria were shut down by the government of the United States for spreading disinformation. It was also banned by multiple social media platforms including YouTube, Twitter, Instagram and Reddit.

==== Broadcasting via illegal IPTV services and streaming devices ====
According to a 2008 report by the security company NAGRA and the Digital Citizens Alliance, following an investigation into illegal IPTV services and illicit streaming devices, it indicated that 50% of these services include Al-Manar, making it available in countries where the channel has been banned due to links with Hezbollah.

On October 26, 2020, the Digital Citizens Alliance released a video warning of terrorist content that could include several of these illegal services, including Al-Manar.

==== Google and Apple applications ====
On 25 July 2012, Al Manar launched an application through Apple's iTunes app store and Google Play. However, the application was removed from iTunes after four days and Google Play after six. Maha Abouelenein, Head of Communications for the Mena at Google, subsequently stated that "We remove applications that violate our policies, such as apps that are illegal or that promote hate speech" although she added that "We don't comment on individual applications – however, you can check out our policies for more."

According to MEMRI, Al Manar TV subsequently blamed "Israeli incitement against Al Manar TV" as the reason Al-Manar mobile apps were removed by Apple and Google. An Al-Manar TV reporter stated that: "Al Manar TV is once again targeted by America and Israel. The removal of the channel's mobile apps from the Google and Apple stores is a new attempt to curb Al-Manar's message of resistance. According to MEMRI, Al Manar TV Director-General Abdallah Qasir stated that the removal of the apps "indicates that Al Manar TV has the ability to cause great harm to Israel, and that Israel is extremely annoyed by Al Manar becoming so widespread and by its great credibility. Israel cannot even bear to see the Al-Manar icon on smartphones." Abd Al-Hadi Mahfouz, president of the Lebanese National Media Council, also supported Al-Manar, arguing that: "This move contradicts all laws pertaining to radio and television, to the exercising of media liberties, and to the right of citizens, Western and Arab alike, to information." Rabi' Al-Ba'lbaki, the head of the Lebanese IT Association reportedly called for a boycott of Apple and Google if they do not restore service for Al-Manar's applications.

According to the Anti-Defamation League, in a statement issued on 16 August 2012, Al Manar says it is "back on Ipad and Iphone applications via alternative ways, following the campaign carried out by the Jewish Anti-Defamation League to deactivate Al-Manar applications on smart phones at Google Play and apple store". To avoid distributor policies and control, the new applications were downloadable directly from Al-Manar's website, which was hosted by a British server.

In March 2014, Al Manar relaunched their application in Apple's iTunes store under the name "LCG." It launched a new iPhone app in 2016, called "Trust News".

== See also ==
- al-Manar (for the early 20th century journal of the same name)
- Mohammed Hassan Dbouk, accredited al-Manar journalist believed to have misused his credentials in support of Hezbollah militant activities
- Television in Lebanon
- Al-Ahed News
- Al-Manar Football Festival
- Al-Nour

== Notes ==
=== Bibliography ===
- Conway, Maura (18 June 2008). "Terror TV? An exploration of Hizbollah's al-Manar television". Countering terrorism and insurgency in the 21st century (PDF). Greenwood Publishing Group, Inc. pp. 401–419. ISBN 978-0-275-99034-3.
- Jorisch, Avi (2004). Beacon of Hatred: Inside Hizballahs Al-Manar Television. Washington Institute for Near East Policy. ISBN 0-944029-88-4.
- Najjar, Orayb Aref (2022). "Al-Manar". The SAGE Encyclopedia of Journalism. Thousand Oaks, California: SAGE Publications. doi:10.4135/9781544391199.n24. ISBN 978-1-5443-9115-1.
- Sindawi, Khalid (2009). "The Shiite Turn in Syria" (PDF). Current Trends in Islamist Ideology. 8: 82–107. Archived from the original (PDF) on 24 September 2015.
