= D-8-XM-TV =

PTV Cordillera (D-8-XM-TV)
- Baguio; Philippines
- Channels: Analog: 8 (VHF); Digital: 42 (UHF) (ISDB-T) (Test Broadcast); Virtual: 4.01
- Branding: PTV Cordillera (PTV-8 Baguio)

Programming
- Subchannels: See list
- Affiliations: PTV

Ownership
- Owner: People's Television Network, Inc.

History
- Founded: 1967
- Former call signs: D-3-ZO-TV (1974-1986)
- Former channel number: 3 (1974-1986)
- Former affiliations: Associated Broadcasting Corporation (1967-1972); BBC (1973-1986)

Technical information
- Licensing authority: NTC
- Power: Analog: 5,000 watts; Digital: 5,000 watts
- ERP: Analog: 25,000 watts

Links
- Website: www.ptni.gov.ph

D-8-XM-TV (channel 8) known on-air as PTV Cordillera, is a television station in North Central Luzon, Philippines, a regional of Philippine-government owned television network People's Television Network. Its studio is located at the PTV Cordillera Broadcast Hub, PIA Northern Luzon Compound, Romulo Drive, Brgy. Lualhati, Baguio and its transmitter is located at Mount Santo Tomas, Tuba, Benguet Province.

== History ==
- 1967 - D-8-XM-TV, broadcasting on Channel 8 was launched by Associated Broadcasting Corporation (now TV5 Network, Inc.). The station remained on the air until 1972, when it was forced to cease operations following President Ferdinand Marcos' declaration of Martial Law.
- 1973 - D-8-XM-TV Channel 8 resumed broadcasting and became part of the Banahaw Broadcasting Corporation.
- 1986 - PTV began its broadcasts in Baguio following the People Power Revolution.
- July 1989 - PTV Baguio began local operations. The station was initially based in an apartment in downtown Baguio. However, in 1990, its local operations were suspended after its facilities were severely damaged by the Luzon earthquake, after which the station was downgraded to a relay station
- March 26, 1992 - President Corazon Aquino signed Republic Act 7306, converting PTV into a government-owned corporation formally known as the People's Television Network, Inc. (PTNI).
- July 16, 2001 - Under new management appointed by President Gloria Macapagal Arroyo, PTNI adopted the name National Broadcasting Network (NBN) and the slogan “One People. One Nation. One Vision” as part of a new corporate identity and programming direction. The NBN name remained in use until 2010, during the administration of President Benigno Aquino III.
- October 6, 2011 - People's Television Network, Inc. (PTNI) was restored as the network's primary corporate and on-air brand, replacing the NBN branding.
- March 11, 2017 - PTV Baguio resumed its local operations and was upgraded to an originating station, following the inauguration of the newly constructed PTV Cordillera Broadcast Hub. The inauguration was led by President Rodrigo Duterte, Presidential Communications Secretary Martin Andanar and PTV General Manager and CEO Dino Antonio C. Apolonio. The network had broken ground for the construction of the broadcast hub in March 2013. Construction was subsequently halted following the issue of a preliminary injunction. Construction resumed in April 2014 and the building was completed in February 2017. During the inauguration, President Duterte also inspected two newly-acquired Digital Satellite News Gathering vans intended for the network's live news coverage.
- April 27, 2021 - PTV Cordillera commenced digital test broadcasts on UHF channel 42.

== Programming ==
Current

- Kangrunaan a Damag (Afternoon newscast)
- Isyu @ Serbisyo (Saturday talk show)
- Cordilleran Country: Aweng Ti Biag
- Iskoolmates sa Norte
- Panagbenga Festival (yearly)

Former

- PTV Cordillera Newsbreak (Nationwide airing)
- Be Unrivaled with Jianlin F.

== Digital television ==
=== Digital channels ===
UHF Channel 42 (641.143 MHz)

Channel	Video	Aspect	Short name	Programming	Note
4.01	480i (sometimes 1080i)	16:9	PTV	PTV Baguio (Main D-8-XM-TV programming)	Test Broadcast (2 kW)
4.02	480i (sometimes 1080i)	16:9	PTV SPORTS	PTV Sports	Test Broadcast (2 kW)
4.03	480i (sometimes 1080i)	16:9	PTV SD3	Black Screen	Test Broadcast (2 kW)
8.04	240p	4:3	PTV 1seg	PTV	1seg

== Areas of coverage ==
=== Primary areas ===
- Baguio
- Benguet
- La Union
- Pangasinan

=== Secondary areas ===
- Nueva Ecija
- Tarlac
- Parts of Ilocos Sur

== See also ==
- People's Television Network
- List of People's Television Network stations and channels
- DWGT-TV - the network's flagship station in Manila.
- DZEQ
