= DXMR =

DXMR may refer to:

- DXMR-AM, an AM radio station broadcasting in Zamboanga City, branded as Radyo Pilipinas.
- DXMR-FM, an FM radio station broadcasting in Cagayan de Oro, branded as Magnum Radio.
