= Ash-Shatat =

Ash-Shatat (Arabic: الشتات, lit. 'The Diaspora'; also transliterated Al Shatat) is a 29-part Syrian television series, produced in 2003 by a private Syrian film company, Linn, at a cost of $5.1m.

== Production ==
Although it was produced in Syria and the closing credits give "special thanks" to various Syrian government entities (including the security ministry, the culture ministry, the Damascus Police Command, and the Department of Antiquities and Museums), Syrian national television "declined to air the program". According to Al Jazeera English, it was commissioned by Hezbollah's Al-Manar media channel.

== Content ==
The series portrays the history of the Zionist movement and the creation of the state of Israel and includes scenes on The Protocols of the Elders of Zion.

== Broadcast ==
Ash-Shatat was shown on Lebanon's Al-Manar during Ramadan in late 2003.

In 2003, the Australian Broadcasting Authority (ABA) launched an investigation into it, leading to Al-Manar's suspension from the Television and Radio Broadcasting Services PTY (TARBS).

In 2004, the Conseil Représentatif des Institutions juives de France said that scenes in Al-Shatat, which purported to depict the history of the Zionist movement, portrayed the killing of a Christian child by Jews to use the victim's blood to make matzoh. Al-Manar was consequently banned in France. Al-Manar responded that the French decision was political and not legal, influenced by Israel and Jewish lobbies. Al-Manar's management later apologized for airing the series, dropped it, and explained that the station had purchased it without first viewing the entire series, according to Franklin Lamb [in CounterPunch]."

The series was shown in Iran in 2004.

Jordan's Mamnou’ TV bought the show for $1.25 million and screened 22 episodes during Ramadan in October 2005 before pulling it. The station said the series “was stopped for technical, not political reasons”, although the US-based Coalition Against Terrorist Media had complained about the series to Jordan's king.

== US complaint ==
In 2003, the US complained to Lebanon and Syria over the series. Lebanese officials refused to interfere with al-Manar's programming and one of them was quoted as saying:

The United States has a strange conception of freedom of expression... What would they say if we tried to interfere with the way Fox News portrays Arabs, Muslims or Palestinians?

— Lebanon rebuffs US over TV series,

In response, Hezbollah said it was “an artistic work based on clear historical facts” and Al-Manar’s program director, Nasser Akhdar, said the series was “purely historical”, based on 250 sources written by Jews.

The program covers the history of the Jews and the Zionists between 1812 and 1948, he said, and underlines the Jewish emigration to Palestine, the Balfour Declaration, and the European policies regarding this issue during that period. “It offers a clear image of what the Zionists have committed in the social, political, and ideological fields,” Akhdar said. “It is a voice against all those who wish to hide the truth.” He said US complaints were an attempt to “misguide public opinion,” adding that this was part of the US strategy of hegemony over the media to “cancel other people’s opinions.” Akhdar said that the program showed the difference between Jews and Zionists, adding that some Jews were against the establishment of the state of Israel in 1948, but “it seems that those Jews have disappeared now.”

== Criticism ==
According to Daniel Greene, the curator of the U.S. Holocaust Memorial Museum’s exhibition about the Protocols:

[One] scene includes all the classic hallmarks of conspirators at work: In an underground location, a dozen men surround a candle-lit table and talk in hushed tones. The eldest speaks first. “We need to help Hitler annihilate the Jews,” he declares, “because this is the only way to drive the Jews from the countries that Hitler has not yet occupied to immigrate to the Promised Land.” The year is 1940. The location is somewhere in Palestine. The men are the Elders of Zion. And, none of it is true.

The series was described as antisemitic by the US Bureau of Democracy, Human Rights, and Labor and Jewish associations.

According to Ha'aretz, Zionist leaders portrayed in it are mostly shown wearing Haredi ("ultra-Orthodox") clothing, and depicted as conspirators and plotters. According to Al-Jazeera, it "included characters portraying Jews speaking of a global Jewish government. In one scene, an actress playing a diseased prostitute in a European brothel run by a Jewish madam speaks of her desire to infect non-Jews."

== See also ==
- List of Syrian television series
- Contemporary imprints of The Protocols of the Elders of Zion
