= Salaam TV (Philippine TV channel) =

Defunct Television channel in the Philippines

- Headquarters: Philippines

Ownership
- Owner: Presidential Communications Office (People's Television Network)
- Sister channels: PCO TV

History
- Launched: July 3, 2017; 8 years ago (test broadcast); July 23, 2017; 8 years ago (full broadcast)
- Closed: September 12, 2023; 2 years ago
- Replaced by: Radyo Pilipinas 1 Television

Salaam TV was a Philippine government-owned Islamic channel owned by the Presidential Communications Office through the People's Television Network (PTV). The channel's main programming is solely focused on Filipino Muslims and other Islamic communities in the country. At present, the channel is on test broadcast via digital terrestrial television on PTV's digital subchannel (via UHF 14) and Expand to cable television on SkyCable and Destiny Cable Channel 4 depending on the digital boxes' channel availability from 12 noon to 8:00 p.m. It was also the second Islamic television network based in the Philippines, following the launch of Davao-based Islamic cable channel Mensahe TV.

The channel launched on July 23, 2017. Former PTV News presenter Princess Habibah Sarip-Paudac, the first Filipina newsreader to wear a hijab on a national television newscast, took role as the station manager of the station.

President Rodrigo Duterte, in his first State of the Nation Address on July 25, 2016, stated that the government will put up two state-run TV channels for Filipino Muslims and the Lumad, hence Salaam TV was established, while the channel for the Lumad is still being planned.

The channel ceased broadcast on September 12, 2023 after 6 years and a month and was replaced by the TeleRadyo Channel of Radyo Pilipinas 1.

== See also ==
- People's Television Network
