= Mohammed Hassan Dbouk =

Mohammed Hassan Dbouk (in Arabic محمد حسن دبوق) was a Lebanese-Canadian accredited journalist with al-Manar television in Lebanon. He is alleged to have received intelligence training at Iranian camps alongside the Revolutionary Guard, and to have used his credentials to film Hezbollah targets prior to, and during, attacks, and used the footage to create "propaganda videos" which he credited to himself.

== Life in Canada ==
After immigrating to Vancouver claiming to be a refugee in 1998, Dbouk allegedly operated a branch of Hezbollah in the city for nine months, raising $1,300,000, through credit card and banking scams, and spending the money on military equipment subsequently smuggled back into Lebanon with the help of his brother-in-law Ali Adham Amhaz.

He reported to procurement chief Haj Hassan al-Laqqis, and was responsible for shipping night vision goggles, GPS systems, stun guns, nitrogen cutters and laser range finders to Hezbollah. His "cell" also sought to obtain life insurance policies for Lebanese militants.

Believed to be a colleague of Imad Mughniyah based on a fax intercepted by Canadian authorities, he was the subject of a wiretap by the Canadian Security Intelligence Service, who recorded him speaking to a colleague named Said about a Southern Lebanese man who might go for a "walk" soon and never return, and whether Said could serve as a reference to get him some necessary travel papers and documentation.

He was indicted, but believed to have fled to Lebanon. After his flight, childhood friend Said Harb took a companion up to Vancouver from their North Carolina home, and made a number of purchases of military equipment under the direction of Dbouk.
