= List of People's Television Network stations and channels =

These are the channels of the People's Television Network in the Philippines.

== TV stations ==
=== Digital ===
Branding	Callsign	Channel	Frequency	Power	Location
PTV Manila	DWGT	14	473.143 MHz	10 kW	Broadcast Complex, Visayas Avenue, Quezon City
PTV Ilocos Norte	D-11-ZV	42	641.143 MHz	1 kW	MMSU Rd, Quiling Sur, Batac, Ilocos Norte
PTV Cordillera	D-8-XM	42	641.143 MHz	2 kW	Sitio Guisset, Mt. Sto. Tomas, Tuba, Benguet
PTV Legazpi	DZPN	39	623.143 MHz	1 kW	Brgy. 10706, Estanza, Legazpi, Albay
PTV Naga	DWMA	46	665.143 MHz	1 kW	Km 4, Zone 7, San Felipe, Naga, Camarines Sur
PTV Guimaras	DYDY	23	527.143 MHz	1 kW	Brgy. San Miguel, Jordan, Guimaras
PTV Cebu	DYPT	42	641.143 MHz	2.5 kW	Brgy. Babag, Mt. Busay, Cebu City
PTV Tacloban	DYPN	43	647.143 MHz	1 kW	City Hall Compound, Kanhuraw Hills, Tacloban
PTV Calbayog	DYWP	29	563.143 MHz	1 kW	Brgy. Hamorawon, Calbayog
PTV Dipolog	DXXM	25	539.143 MHz	1 kW	Brgy. San Jose, Dipolog
PTV Davao	DXNP	45	659.143 MHz	5 kW	Shrine Hills, Matina, Davao City

PTV Main and Subchannels
LCN	Video	Aspect	Name	Programming	Note
xx.01	1080i	16:9	PTV HD1	PTV	Commercial Broadcast
xx.02	480i	16:9	PTV SD1	PTV	Commercial Broadcast
xx.03	480i	16:9	PTV SD2	Radyo Pilipinas 1	Commercial Broadcast
xx.04	480i	16:9	PTV SD3	PTV Sports Network	Commercial Broadcast
xx.31	240p	4:3	PTV 1SEG	PTV One Seg	1seg

=== Analog ===
Branding	Callsign	Channel	Power	Type	Location
PTV Manila	DWGT	4	50 kW	Originating	Broadcast Complex, Visayas Avenue, Quezon City
PTV Ilocos Norte	D-11-ZV	11	5 kW	Relay	MMSU Rd, Quiling Sur, Batac, Ilocos Norte
PTV Cordillera	D-8-XM	8	5 kW	Originating	Sitio Guisset, Mt. Sto. Tomas, Tuba, Benguet
PTV Palawan	DYGS	4	1 kW	Relay	City Hall Compound, Brgy. Sta Monica, Puerto Princesa
PTV Naga	DWMA	4	5 kW	Relay	Km 4, Zone 7, San Felipe, Naga, Camarines Sur
PTV Guimaras	DYDY	2	5 kW	Relay	Brgy. San Miguel, Jordan, Guimaras
PTV Dumaguete	D-10-YM	10	1 kW	Relay	Mariano Perdices Memorial Coliseum, Dumaguete
PTV Cebu	DYPT	11	10 kW	Relay	Brgy. Babag, Mt. Busay, Cebu City
PTV Tacloban (Note: Off the air.)	DYPN	8	1 kW	Relay	City Hall Compound, Kanhuraw Hills, Tacloban
PTV Calbayog	DYWP	12	1 kW	Relay	Brgy. Hamorawon, Calbayog
PTV Zamboanga	DXVC	7	5 kW	Relay	Murok, Upper Pasonanca, Zamboanga City
PTV Pagadian	PA	11	5 kW	Relay	Mt. Palpalan, Pagadian
PTV Sibugay	DXSI	11	1 kW	Affiliate	Municipal Hall Complex, Ipil, Zamboanga Sibugay
PTV Davao	DXNP	11	10 kW	Originating	Shrine Hills, Matina, Davao City
PTV Davao del Norte	DXPT	48	5 kW	Affiliate	Capitol Compound, Brgy. Mankilam, Tagum, Davao del Norte
PTV Kidapawan	PA	8	1 kW	Relay	Capitol Compound, Amas, Kidapawan
PTV Cotabato	DXAA	8	5 kW	Relay	Don E. Sero cor. 6th Sts., Rosary Heights, Cotabato City
PTV Marawi	PA	7	5 kW	Relay	New Capitol Complex Buadi Sacayo, Marawi
PTV Tawi-Tawi	PA	4	0.4 kW	Relay	Tubig-Boh, Bongao, Tawi-Tawi
PTV Agusan del Sur	DXSK	32	1 kW	Affiliate	Mt. Magdiwata, Agusan del Sur

== See also ==
- People's Television Network
