= Mensahe TV =

Islam-focused television channel in the Philippines

Mensahe TV Philippines
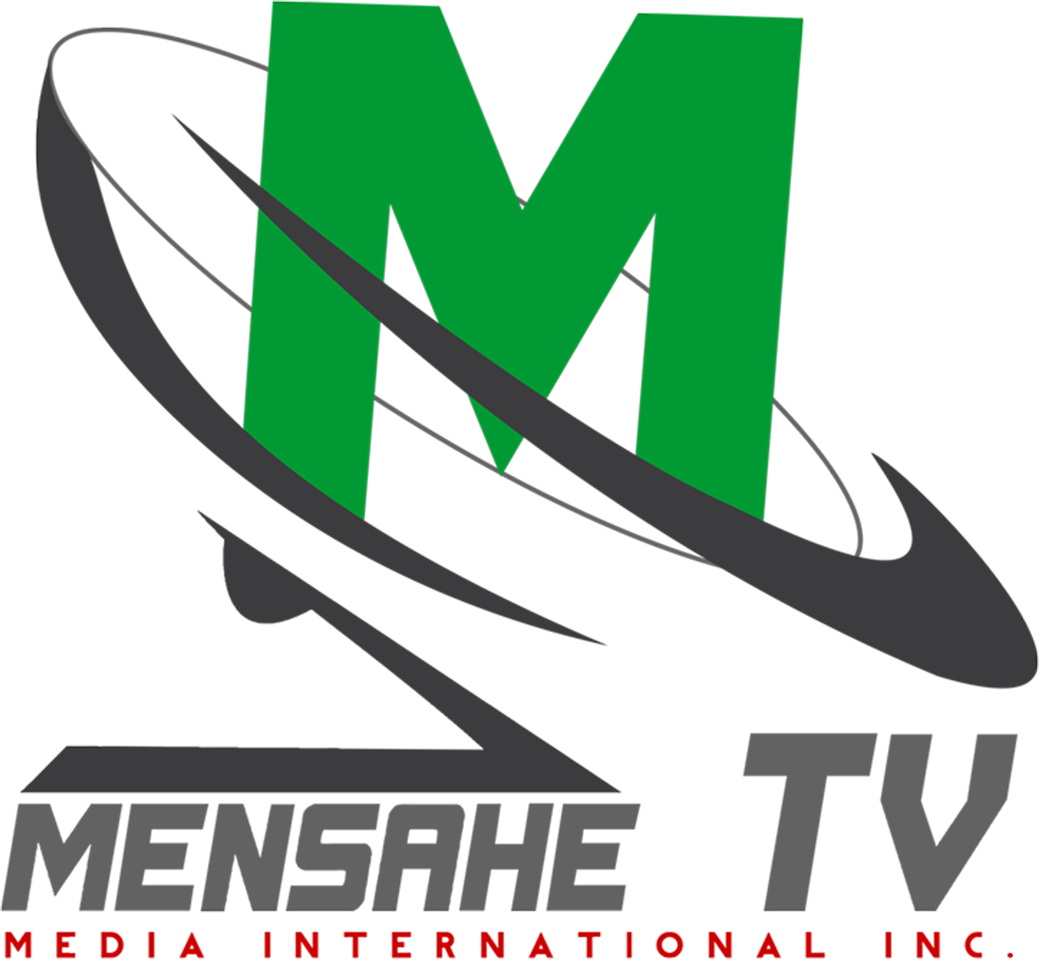

Programming
- Picture format: 720p (HDTV)

History
- Launched: April 22, 2015 (test broadcast); June 1, 2015 (full broadcast)

Mensahe TV (lit. Message TV) is an Islam-focused television channel in the Philippines. It is run by the Mercy Islamic Foundation and airs on Cignal cable, Channel 184, and Sky Cable; with its studios and offices based in Davao City. It also provides content via mobile applications, social media, and on their website.

As of 2018, Mensahe TV has ceased airing on Cignal cable, but can still be viewed via social media and on-air thru PTV Channel 4.

== History ==
Mensahe TV first entered media broadcast thru AM radio. Mensahe TV worked with RPN and Radio Ukay Davao on a series of radio programs in 2016.

In 2017, Mensahe TV merged with Mercy Online Islamic Channel and took directors Brandon Gorospe and Ralph Jasper Jose of Studio One Productions for a new scheme of operations; this merger made Mensahe TV as the new International standard for Suni Islam. Mensahe TV then set up a division, this is to incorporate films as Mensahe TV and recorded content (tasjil) for Mercy Islamic Foundation. Salipada Datumanong as managing director funded the renovation of the new studio at Davao city giving way to new programs such as Tara! Sabay Tayo and Aqeedah.

== Actors ==
- Andrade, Abdullah (Salvador Andrade Jr.)
- Abdullah, Bedejim
- Barcelon, Akhmad
- Cacharo, Ismael
- Caderao, Abdulrahman
- Capariño, Nuh
- Datumanong, Ebraheem
- Datumanong, Salipada
- Español, Ismael
- Gamboa, Joonie
- Gorospe, Brandon
- Javier, Akhmad
- Javier, Shaheed
- Jose, Ralph Jasper
- Luspo. Ada Grace
- Macacoa, Jamil (Imam)
- Masbod, Amor
- Menk, Ismael (Mufti)
- Navarra, Mujahid
- Patriarca, Hudhayfa
- Santillan, Abdulkareem
- Villasencio, Gibson

== Film ==
- Islam in the Philippines (2016)
- The Call of our Forefathers (2016)
- Hiwar - an Open Dialogue (2017)
- Gabay (2018)
- Building Bridges (2018)
- Building Bridges (2019)
- Bukal (2020)
