= DWRB =

Radio station in Naga, Camarines Sur, Philippines

Radyo Pilipinas Naga (DWRB)
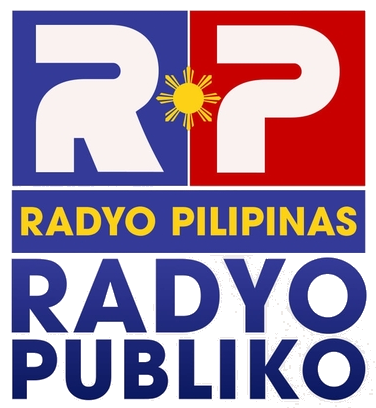
- Naga; Philippines
- Broadcast area: Camarines Sur and surrounding areas
- Frequency: 549 kHz
- Branding: Radyo Pilipinas

Programming
- Languages: Bicolano, Filipino
- Format: News, Public Affairs, Talk, Government Radio
- Network: Radyo Pilipinas

Ownership
- Owner: Presidential Broadcast Service
- Sister stations: PTV-4 Naga

History
- First air date: 1987
- Call sign meaning: Radyo ng Bayan (Former Branding)

Technical information
- Licensing authority: NTC
- Power: 10,000 watts

Links
- Webcast: DWRB Radyo Pilipinas LIVE Audio
- Website: PBS

DWRB (549 AM) Radyo Pilipinas is a radio station owned and operated by the Presidential Broadcast Service. Its studio is located at City Youth Center, Taal Ave., Brgy Dayangdang, Naga, Camarines Sur, and its transmitter is located in Bula, Camarines Sur.
