= List of firsts in Southeast Asia =

The following is a list of firsts in Southeast Asia.

== Architecture ==
The following are the first buildings of their type:

- First philatelic museum in Southeast Asia - Singapore Philatelic Museum (Singapore, 19 August 1995)
- First skyscraper in Southeast Asia - Cathay Building (Singapore, 1 July 1940)

== Beauty Pageants ==
- First international beauty pageant titleholder from Southeast Asia - Gemma Cruz-Araneta (Philippines, 14 August 1964)
- First Muslim to win an international beauty pageant from Southeast Asia - Kevin Lilliana (Indonesia, 14 November 2017)
- First Southeast Asia Country to own an international beauty pageant - (Philippines, 2001)

== Education ==
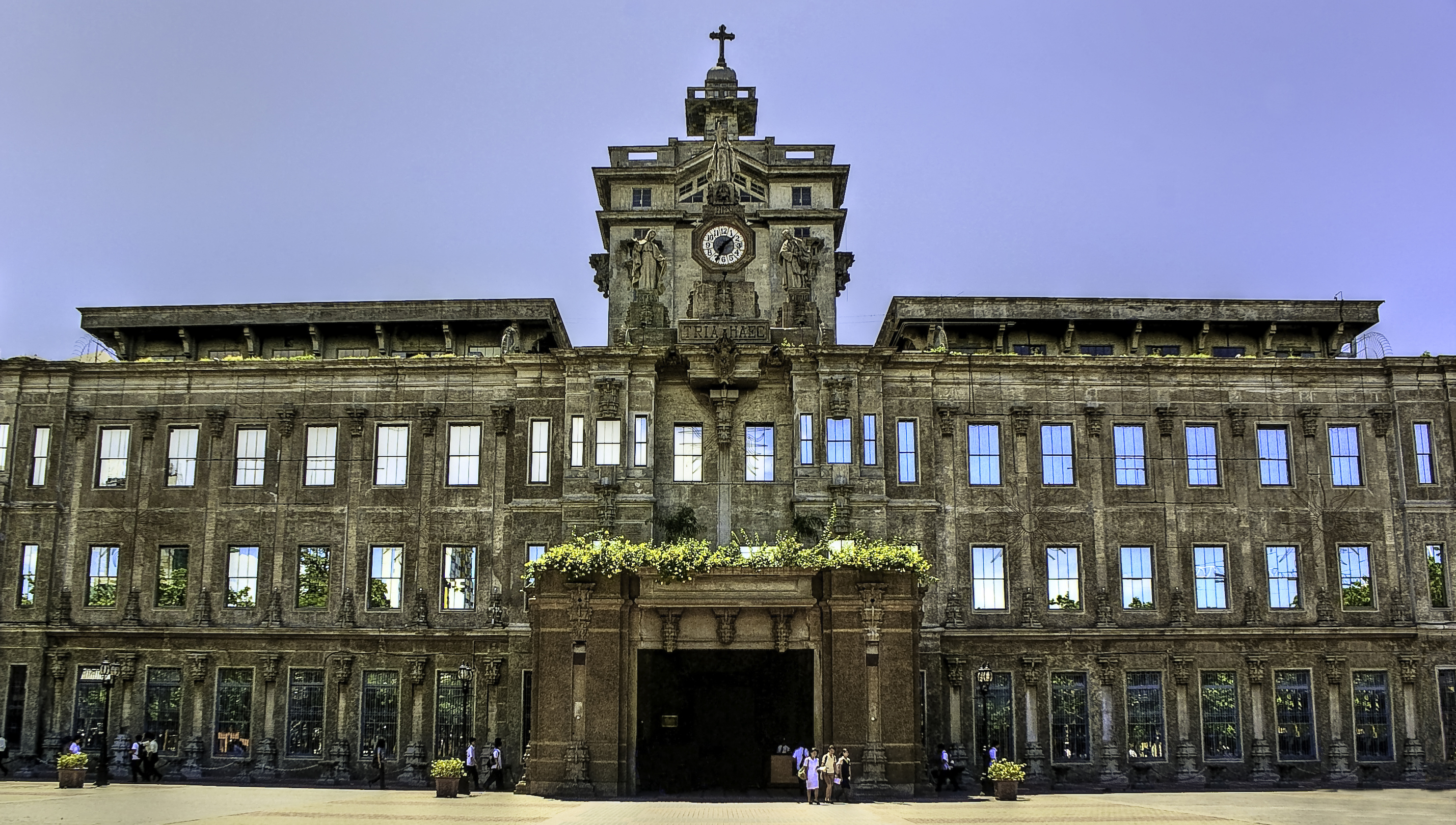
The University of Santo Tomas was established in 1611, making it even older than Harvard University.

- First university in Asia - University of Santo Tomas (Philippines, 1611)
- First English medium school in Southeast Asia - Penang Free School (Malaysia, 1816)
- First Asian and Southeast Asian to be admitted to Harvard University - Fe del Mundo (Philippines, 1936) (Note: del Mundo was also the first ever woman to be admitted to Harvard University.)

== Energy ==
- First wind power farm in the region - Bangui Wind Farm (Philippines, 20 June 2005)
- First nuclear power plant in the region - Bataan Nuclear Power Plant (Philippines,1976)

== Exploration ==
- First Southeast Asian in space - Phạm Tuân (Vietnam, 6 June 1980)

== Entertainment and media ==
=== Film ===
==== Awards ====
- First Southeast Asian film to win Palme d'Or at Cannes - Uncle Boonmee Who Can Recall His Past Lives (Thailand, 2013)
- First Southeast Asian to win Best Actress at Cannes - Jaclyn Jose (Philippines, 2016)
- First Southeast Asian to win Best Director at Cannes - Brillante Mendoza (Philippines, 2009)
- First Southeast Asian to win Volpi Cup for Best Actor at Venice Film Festival - John Arcilla (Philippines, 2021)

=== Journalism ===
- First newspaper published in Southeast Asia - The Prince of Wales Island Gazette (Malaysia, 1806)
- First commercial television broadcast - Alto Broadcasting System (Philippines, 23 October 1953)
- First Southeast Asian to win a Pulitzer Prize - Carlos Rómulo (Philippines, 1942)

=== Theater arts ===
- First Southeast Asian to win a Tony for Best Actress - Lea Salonga (Philippines, 1991)

=== Music ===
- First Southeast Asian to win a Grammy - Larry Ramos (Philippines, 1963)
- First Southeast Asian act to be nominated at the Billboard Music Awards - SB19 (Philippines, 2021)
- First Southeast Asian act to top a Billboard Chart - SB19, Hot Trending Songs Chart (Philippines, 2021)

== Finance and commerce ==
- First bank in Southeast Asia - El Banco Español Filipino de Isabel II (now Bank of the Philippine Islands) (Philippines, 1 August 1851)
- First beer brewery in Southeast Asia - La Fabrica de Cerveza de San Miguel (Philippines, 29 September 1890)

== Literature ==
- First Southeast Asian to win a Pulitzer Prize for Literature - Viet Thanh Nguyen (Vietnam, 2016)

== Politics and government ==
- First President of UN General Assembly from Asia and Southeast Asia - Carlos P. Rómulo (Philippines, 1949)
- First elected female President in Asia and Southeast Asia - Maria Corazon Aquino (Philippines, 1986)
- First recipient of Nobel Peace Prize from Southeast Asia - Technically: Lê Đức Thọ (Vietnam, 1973), Officially: Aung San Suu Kyi (Myanmar, 1991)

== Science and technology ==
- First submarine assembled in Southeast Asia: KRI Alugoro (405) (Indonesia, 2021)
- First satellite operated by a Southeast Asian country: Palapa A1 (Indonesia, 1976)

== Sports ==
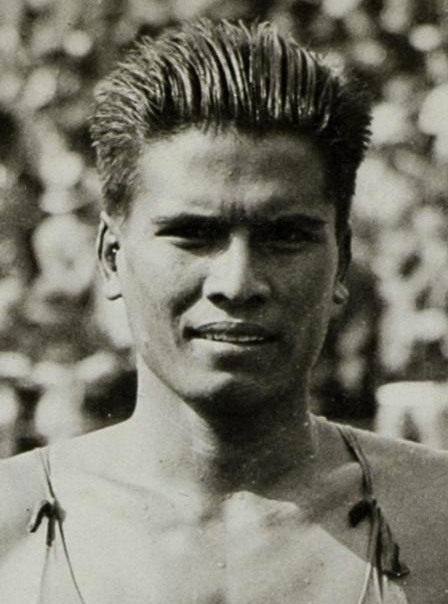
Teófilo Yldefonso from the Philippines, the first Southeast Asian to win a medal at the Olympics.

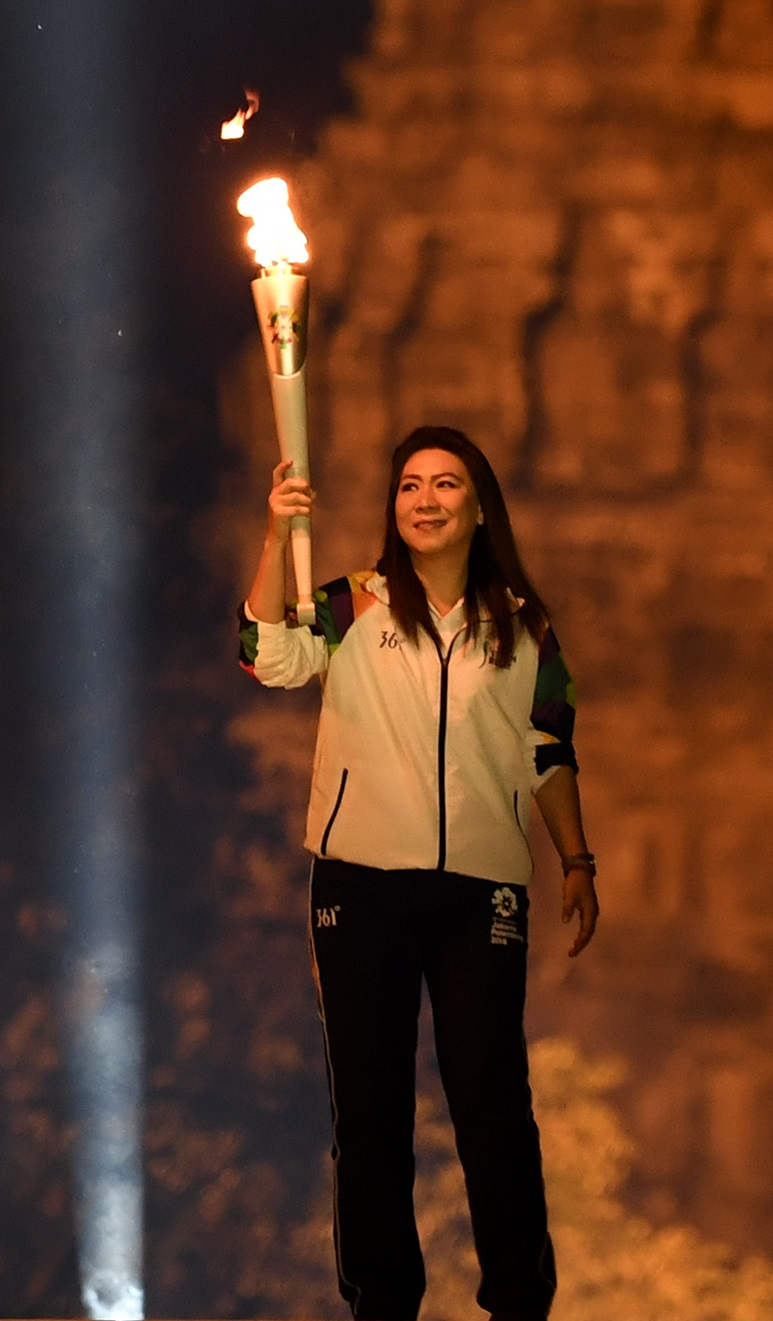
Susi Susanti, of Indonesia, the first Olympic champion from Southeast Asia.

=== Olympic Games ===
- First Southeast Asian to win a medal at the Olympics - Teófilo Yldefonso, swimming bronze (Philippines, 8 August 1928)
- First Southeast Asian Olympic champion - Susi Susanti, badminton gold (Indonesia, 4 August 1992)
- First Southeast Asian country to participate at the Summer Olympics - The Philippines, 5 July 1924
- First Southeast Asian country to participate at the Winter Olympics - The Philippines, 3 February 1972
- First Southeast Asian to win a gold medal at the men's gymnastics of the Olympics - Carlos Yulo (Philippines, 3 August 2024)

=== World Championships ===
- First male Artistic Gymnastics World Champion from Southeast Asia - Carlos Yulo, floor exercise (Philippines, 2019)

=== Others ===
- First professional basketball league in Asia and Southeast Asia - Philippine Basketball Association (Philippines, 9 April 1975)
- First Southeast Asian country to host the Asian Games - The Philippines, 1 May 1954
- First Southeast Asian country to host the Youth Olympic Games - Singapore, 14 August 2010

== Transportation ==
- First airport in Asia - Don Mueng International Airport (Thailand, 1914)
- First Rapid transit system in Southeast Asia - Manila Light Rail Transit (Philippines, 1984)
- First bus rapid transit in Southeast Asia - Transjakarta (Indonesia, 2004)
