= Al-Nour =

Lebanese pro-Hezbollah radio station established in 1988

- Beirut; Lebanon

Ownership
- Owner: Hezbollah; (Lebanese Communication Group)

History
- First air date: May 9, 1988

Links
- Website: alnour.com.lb

Al-Nour (Arabic: النور; The Light) is a radio station based in Beirut, Lebanon. The station was established on 9 May 1988 and is owned by Hezbollah.

In July 2006, during the 2006 Lebanon War, Israel attacked Hezbollah's TV station Al-Manar and radio station Al-Nour in Haret Hreik.

== Objectives ==
Former logo of Al-Nour.

Al Nour has stated some of its objectives as:

1. Introducing culture as well as values that stem from divine messengers.
2. To protect their national interests by exposing major issues that threaten its interest such as facing the plans of Zionist imperialism.
3. To arouse the nation and steering its capabilities towards the support of the resistance in order to liberate their land.
4. Looking into the problems of all righteous nations.
5. Working objectively as a media that will establish an effective and productive public opinion.

== Terrorism designation ==
Al-Nour is designated by the US OFAC as a Specially Designated Global Terrorist group, which allows the US to block the assets of foreign individuals and entities that commit, or pose a significant risk of committing, acts of terrorism.

== See also ==
- Hezbollah
- Lebanese Communication Group
- Specially Designated Global Terrorist
