= DWMA-TV =

PTV-4 Bicol (DWMA-TV)
- "Ang Pambansang TV sa Bagong Pilipinas"
- Naga, Camarines Sur; Philippines
- City: Naga City
- Channels: Analog: 4 (VHF); Digital: 46 (UHF) (ISDB-T) (Test Broadcast); Virtual: 4.01
- Branding: PTV-4 Bicol

Programming
- Subchannels: See list
- Affiliations: PTV

Ownership
- Owner: People's Television Network, Inc.
- Sister stations: Radyo Pilipinas 549 khz Naga

History
- Founded: 1972
- Former channel number: 8 (1972-2012)
- Former affiliations: KBS/RPN (1972-1986)
- Call sign meaning: DWMA

Technical information
- Licensing authority: NTC
- Power: Analog: 5,000 watts Digital: 1,000 watts

Links
- Website: www.ptni.gov.ph

DWMA-TV, channel 4, Flagship is a regional television station of Philippine television network In Southern Luzon owned and operated by the People's Television Network. Its transmitter is located at Pacol Road, Brgy. San Felipe, Naga, Camarines Sur.

== History ==
- 1972 - DWMA-TV channel 8 was launched by Kanlaon Broadcasting System.
- 1975 - KBS was formally re-launched as RPN, the acronym for its franchise name, Radio Philippines Network.
- 1986 - Following the People Power Revolution on which it was taken over by pro-Corazon Aquino, the station was reopened as People's Television (PTV).
- March 26, 1992 - President Cory Aquino signed Republic Act 7306 turning PTV Network into a government corporation known formally as People's Television Network, Inc. (PTNI).
- July 16, 2001 - Under the new management appointed by President Gloria Macapagal Arroyo, PTNI adopted the name National Broadcasting Network (NBN) carrying new slogan "One People. One Nation. One Vision." for a new image in line with its new programming thrusts, they continued the new name until the Aquino administration in 2010.
- October 6, 2011 - People's Television Network, Inc. (PTNI) became a primary brand and the branding National Broadcasting Network was retired.
- 2012 - PTV Naga moved its frequency to channel 4.
- 2019 - PTV 4 Naga started digital test broadcasts on UHF Channel 46.
- January 18, 2025 - PTV 4 Naga went off-air.

== Digital television ==
=== Digital channels ===
UHF Channel 46 (665.143 MHz)

Channel	Video	Aspect	Short name	Programming	Note
4.01	1080i (sometimes 720p)	16:9 (sometimes 4:3)	PTV HD1	PTV Naga (Main DWMA-TV programming)	Test Broadcast
4.02	1080i (sometimes 720p)	16:9 (sometimes 4:3)	PTV HD2	Test Feed	Test Broadcast
4.03	1080i (sometimes 720p)	16:9 (sometimes 4:3)	PTV HD3	Test Feed	Test Broadcast
4.04	240p	4:3	PTV 1seg	PTV	1seg

== Area of coverage ==
- Naga City
- Camarines Sur
- Portion of Camarines Norte

== See also ==
- People's Television Network
- List of People's Television Network stations and channels
- DWGT-TV - the network's flagship station in Manila.
- DWRB-AM
