= DXMR-AM =

Radio station in Zamboanga City, Philippines

Radyo Pilipinas Zamboanga (DXMR)
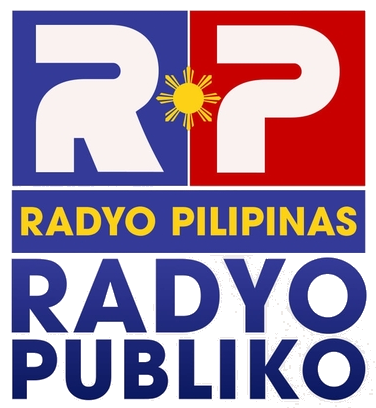
- Zamboanga City; Philippines
- Broadcast area: Zamboanga City, Basilan and surrounding areas
- Frequency: 1170 kHz
- Branding: Radyo Pilipinas

Programming
- Languages: Chavacano, Filipino
- Format: News, Public Affairs, Talk, Government Radio
- Network: Radyo Pilipinas

Ownership
- Owner: Presidential Broadcast Service

History
- First air date: 1950
- Call sign meaning: Manuel Roxas

Technical information
- Licensing authority: NTC
- Power: 6,000 watts

Links
- Webcast: DXMR Radyo Pilipinas LIVE Audio
- Website: PBS

DXMR (1170 AM) Radyo Pilipinas is a radio station owned and operated by the Presidential Broadcast Service. Its studios are located at Baliwasan Chico, Zamboanga City. It is the pioneer AM radio station in the province.
