= National Media Production Center =

Philippine government agency

National Media Production Center (NMPC)
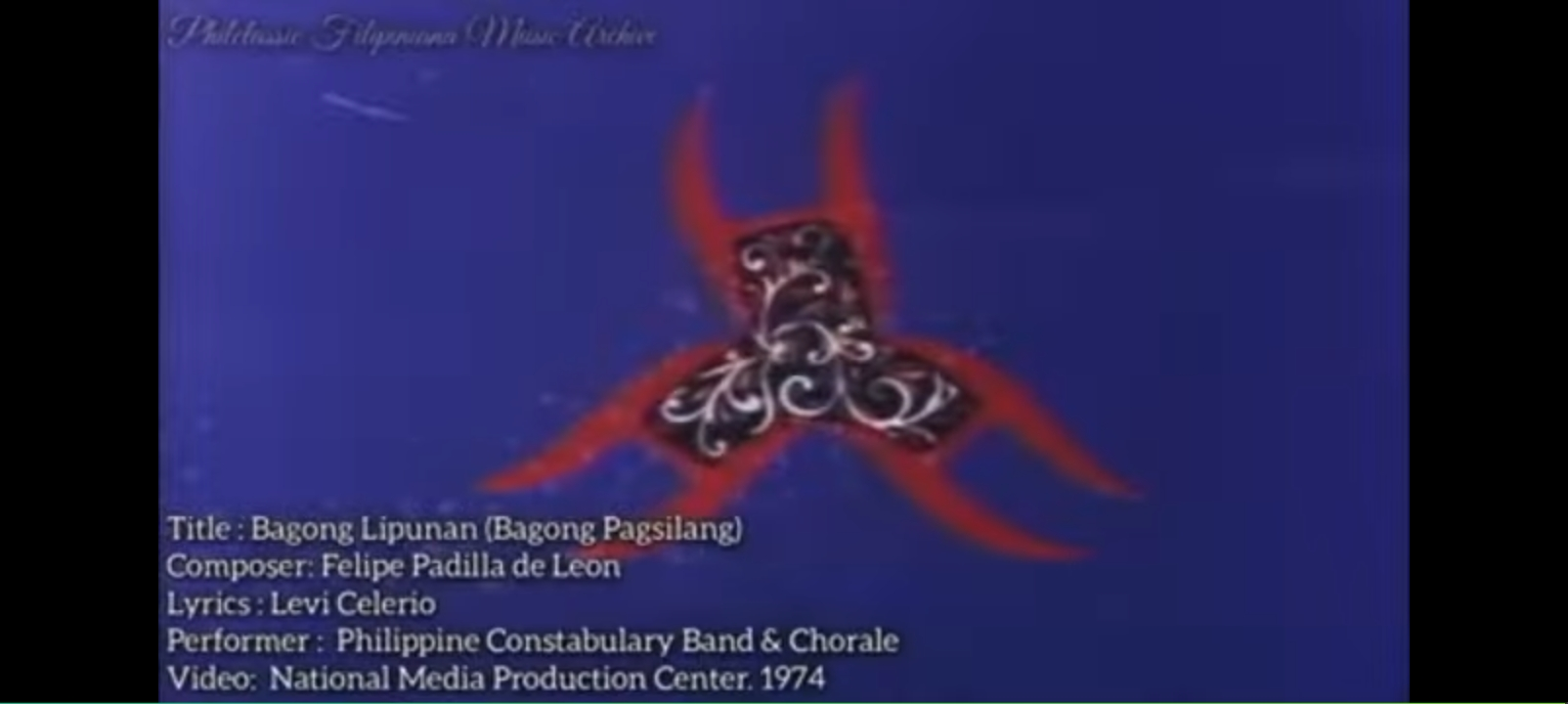
- Company type: State media
- Industry: Broadcast radio and television network
- Founded: June 1, 1953; 73 years ago
- Defunct: 1986; 40 years ago
- Fate: Abolished by the Aquino administration following People Power Revolution
- Successor: People's Television Network; Presidential Broadcast Service
- Headquarters: Intramuros, Manila, Philippines (1960s-1980); Quezon City, Philippines (1980-86)
- Key people: Lito Gorospe; Francisco Tatad; Gregorio Cendana
- Owner: Government of the Philippines (through the Office of the Media Affairs; 1980-1986)

The National Media Production Center (NMPC) was a government-owned media agency in the Philippines that existed during the regime of then-president Ferdinand Marcos. Like any government departments, it was then headed by a secretary, and later by a minister.

== History ==
The NMPC was established on June 1, 1953. They acquired the facilities of the Voice of America in Malolos, Bulacan in 1965 and steadily brought the old complex up to standards by a steady overhaul, fine-tuning, and outright replacement of outmoded equipment and machines. The NMPC operated the Voice of the Philippines, VOP, on both medium wave-918 kHz and shortwave 9.810 mHz transmissions. In 1975, the NMPC obtained DZRB-FM. With this new station and some provincial stations that came under its wings earlier, the NMPC was a network and effectively covered a wide range of the Philippine listenership.

After ABS-CBN was closed and the PBS was abolished to give way for the Bureau of Broadcasts (BB), the government through NMPC started to broadcast its own television station on Channel 4 as "Government Television" (GTV) under Lito Gorospe and later by then-press secretary Francisco Tatad. In 1977, NMPC produced the epic historical anthology film Tadhana: Ito ang Lahing Pilipino (lit. 'Destiny: This is the Filipino race'), recruiting five filmmakers to direct five segments depicting Philippine history, though it ultimately went unreleased. In 1978, the agency produced the film Gisingin Mo ang Umaga (lit. 'You go wake up the morning') directed by Orlando Nadres, which tackled societal issues facing people in the provinces, as well as Lamberto V. Avellana's short documentary film Manuel L. Quezon: A Man and His Dreams, which was timed with the centenary of Quezon's birth.

The BB and the NMPC were brought under one administrative roof in 1980 when the Office of Media Affairs was created to provide a loose union for both networks within the Broadcast Plaza (now ABS-CBN Broadcasting Center) along Bohol Ave. in Quezon City.

At that time, Tatad was succeeded by Gregorio Cendana as the new minister. NMPC relaunched GTV as the Maharlika Broadcasting System (MBS). All networks became the backbone of the Marcos propaganda.

After the People Power Revolution, the Office of Media Affairs, as well as the NMPC itself (along with the BB) were abolished to make way for the creation of the Office of the Press Secretary (OPS) through Memorandum Order No. 32 on September 1, 1986.

== Former stations ==
- Television
  - Government Television (GTV) / Maharlika Broadcasting System (MBS) - now known as the People's Television Network
- Radio (now part of the Presidential Broadcast Service-Bureau of Broadcast Services)
  - DWIM-FM (now DWBR)
  - Voice of the Philippines (now DZRP-Radyo Pilipinas on shortwave, and DZSR on 918 kHz AM)
