= Lebanese Communication Group =

Mass media company by Hezbollah

The Lebanese Communication Group, also sometimes known as the Lebanese Media Group, is a company set up by the Lebanese Islamist political group Hezbollah to manage the networks of Al-Manar and Al-Nour.

Former Hezbollah Secretary General Nasrallah has publicized an invitation for all Lebanese citizens to volunteer for Hezbollah military training on al-Manar and al-Nour, who have been the media arms of the Hezbollah network and have facilitated its activities supported by the IRIB and IRGC. Members of Hezbollah's Executive Council, notably Nasrallah, controlled the budgets of al-Manar and al-Nour.
