= People's Television Network =

Government-owned television network in the Philippines

- The logo used since June 28, 2017
- Type: Broadcast television network
- Country: Philippines

Programming
- Languages: Filipino; English
- Picture format: 1080i/720p HDTV (downscaled to 16:9 480i for the SDTV feed)

Ownership
- Owner: Presidential Communications Office (Government of the Philippines)
- Parent: People's Television Network, Inc.

History
- Launched: February 2, 1974; 52 years ago
- Founder: Lito Gorpose; Francisco Tatad
- Former names: Government Television (February 2, 1974–1980); Maharlika Broadcasting System (1980–February 24, 1986); New TV 4 (February 24–April 1986); National Broadcasting Network (July 16, 2001–January 8, 2012)

Links
- Webcast: Watch Live
- Website: ptvnews.ph

Availability

Terrestrial
- Analog VHF/UHF: Listings may vary
- Digital VHF/UHF: Channel 14
- SkyCable (Metro Manila): Channel 6
- Converge Vision / SkyTV (Metro Manila): Channel 14
- Cablelink (Metro Manila): Channel 6
- Sky Direct (Nationwide): Channel 3
- Cignal TV (Nationwide): Channel 4
- SatLite (Nationwide): Channel 4
- G Sat (Nationwide): Channel 4

People's Television Network, Inc.
- Type: State-owned
- Industry: Mass media
- Predecessor: National Media Production Center (1953–1986)
- Founded: February 2, 1974; 52 years ago (as Government Television); March 26, 1992; 34 years ago (as People's Television Network, Inc.)
- Founders: Lito Gorpose; Francisco Tatad
- Headquarters: Broadcast Complex, Visayas Avenue, Barangay Vasra, Quezon City, Metro Manila, Philippines
- Area served: Philippines
- Key people: Lino Edgardo S. Cayetano (Secretary of the Presidential Communications Office); Victoria C. Recio (Chairwoman); John Benedict T. Tigson (General Manager)
- Products: Broadcasting
- Services: Television; Online
- Operating income: ▲ ₱ 212.6 Million (FY 2019)
- Net income: ▲ ₱ 183.9 Million (FY 2019)
- Total assets: ▲ ₱ 2.852 Billion (FY 2019)
- Total equity: ▲ ₱ 2.268 Billion (FY 2019)
- Owner: Government of the Philippines
- Number of employees: 590 (2018)
- Parent: Presidential Communications Office
- Website: ptni.gov.ph

People's Television Network (abbreviated PTV; Filipino: Telebisyon ng Bayan Network, lit. 'Television of the Nation Network') is one of the state-operated television networks of the Philippine government. Founded in 1974, PTV is the main brand of People's Television Network, Inc. (PTNI), one of the attached agencies under the Presidential Communications Office (PCO).

PTV, along with government-owned media companies Radio Philippines Network (20% minority-owned), Intercontinental Broadcasting Corporation (100% majority-owned) and the Presidential Broadcast Service-Bureau of Broadcast Services, form the media arm of the PCO and acts as a primary state television broadcaster that focuses on news, information and public service programming. Its head office, studios, and radio tower are located at Broadcast Complex, Visayas Avenue, Barangay Vasra, Diliman, Quezon City.

As a government-run station, PTV received funding from the General Appropriations Act (Annual National Budget) and sales from blocktimers and advertisers, among others. PTV also runs two digital television channels Radyo Pilipinas - Radyo Publiko and PTV Sports Network.

== History ==
=== 1933: Origins ===
The first state broadcast in the Philippines was made on May 8, 1933, when the Insular Government established and operated the radio station KZSO (later renamed KZFM after journalist Frederick Marquardt, and is now DZRB-AM), with a frequency of 710 kilohertz and power of 10,000 watts through the United States Information Service. KZFM was later transferred to the new Philippine government after independence in September 1946. The Philippine Broadcasting Service (PBS) was founded a year later to formally manage the radio assets. During this time in the late 1940s, academic experiments on television broadcasting were already being explored by Filipino engineers and students.

Television broadcasting in the country formally began in October 23, 1953 through the commercial company Alto Broadcasting System (ABS-CBN). The broadcast marked the first commercial broadcast in the Philippines and in Southeast Asia, and only the second in Asia after Japan just months earlier. Through PBS, the government began television broadcasting in 1961 with DZRP-TV on VHF channel 10 which it time-shared with two other organizations. The channel was short-lived due to problems of its frequency allocation.

=== 1972–1986: Martial law period ===
Television broadcasters, including government-owned PBS, were shut immediately after Ferdinand Marcos's declaration of martial law on September 28, 1972. On the same day, Marcos ordered the takeover of ABS-CBN Corporation and turned over its facilities to Kanlaon Broadcasting System (KBS), a network controlled by Marcos crony Roberto Benedicto. Under the Marcos regime, crony-owned media companies broadcast or published news and entertainment meant to project a positive image for the regime and to conceal some of its wrongdoings. The facilities were later completely turned over to the government.

While some television broadcasters were eventually permitted to reopen as state-affiliated media, particularly companies owned by Marcos cronies, the government did not operate its own television network until February 2, 1974, when the government agency National Media Production Center started the Government Television (GVT-4). GTV was housed in the Solana Building in Intramuros, Manila, before relocating to seized ABS-CBN Broadcasting Center (renamed Broadcast Plaza at the time) in Bohol Avenue, Quezon City.

In 1976, the network started broadcasting in color, the last national network to do so, when it became the long time home of the Philippine Basketball Association for almost two decades. Come 1978-79, the GTV network was programmed, not only by the NMPC, but also by block timers linked to Radio Philippines Network and the Ministry of Information.

GTV was renamed in 1980 and was briefly known as the Maharlika Broadcasting System (MBS-4). By then, it began expanding with the opening of provincial stations nationwide using the ABS-CBN stations in Cebu, Bacolod, and Davao. MBS-4 was captured by rebel soldiers during the 1986 People Power Revolution. A broadcast of Marcos' press conference in the morning of February 24, 1986 was brought off air before it returned back later in the afternoon with new operators when the facilities were controlled by Radyo Veritas personnel as well as former ABS-CBN technicians and news anchors. Orly Punzalan opened the broadcast with "Channel 4 is on the air again to serve the people." Ad-hoc committees were formed to run various aspects of the station with Tony Santos for behind the scenes production, Fr. Efren Datu for radio operations, Punzalan for television, and Jose Mari Velez for news.

=== 1986–1992: Post martial law restructuring ===
In the immediate aftermath of the People Power Revolution, the network, which was simply referred to as Channel 4, continued to broadcast. However, programming was mostly impromptu outside of special events and scheduled newscasts in the morning, afternoon, evening and late night. Production aspects were mainly performed by volunteers who continued to work under the new administration while erstwhile anchors who worked under the Marcos left. The network was formally rebranded as People's Television (PTV) in April 1986, with broadcasters Tina Monzon-Palma and Jose Mari Velez as heads before they returned to GMA Network.

On February 14, 1991, PTV went on full nationwide satellite broadcast using a transponder from PALAPA C2. With its 32 provincial stations across the country, the network has extended its reach and coverage to approximately 85 percent of the television viewing public nationwide.

=== 1992–2005: Charter establishment, operational challenges ===
On January 22, 1992, PTV moved its studios to the former National Media Production Center building on Visayas Avenue, with transmitters and other equipment widely donated from a French government grant, leaving ABS-CBN in the exclusive control of the Transmission Center, which before the end of the 2nd millennium has become the most advanced transmission center in the country. Based in Quezon City, the network's flagship station, PTV-4, features a high-capacity 40-kilowatt transmitter. The facility is situated atop a 500 ft (150 m) tower, a central component of its broadcast infrastructure.

The People's Television Network formally became a government-owned and controlled corporation with board of directors in March 1992 with the passing of the Republic Act 7306. The charter prohibited the government from providing regular annual appropriations for PTV's operations, only giving it a one-time equity funding for capital outlay and required the corporation to generate revenues on its own, while allowing commercial advertisements for only the first nine years, imposing a total ban starting in July 2001.

Around this time, PTV pioneered educational and cultural programming. Some of its award-winning programs were Tele-aralan ng Kakayahan (which predated ABS-CBN's Knowledge Channel by decades), Ating Alamin, Small World and its successor Kidsongs, For Art's Sake, Coast to Coast and Paco Park Presents. In the 1990s, at the core of its educational programming is the Continuing Studies via Television or CONSTEL, a program aimed at upgrading teaching skills of elementary and secondary teachers of Science and English. Institutionalized by Department of Education, Culture and Sports (DECS), CONSTEL Science and English programs are being used in teacher training by DECS and in Teacher Education Institutions of the Commission on Higher Education.

NBN logo from 2007 to 2011; the NBN wordmark was used from 2001 to 2012.

Another rebrand came on July 16, 2001, renaming the network as National Broadcasting Network (NBN). NBN expanded its broadcast reach with the launching of NBN World on February 19, 2003, in cooperation with the Australian satellite television company TARBS. This global expansion signals new directions for NBN as it becomes accessible to the rest of the world, particularly the millions of Filipinos overseas (in Australia, North America, and the Asia-Pacific). NBN was transmitted via satellite nationwide using Agila 2 before moving to ABS 1 (now ABS 2) in September 2011 and to Telstar 18V.

In 2002, NBN (now PTV) aired a Prayer Interstitial called the Prayer for the Holy Souls in Purgatory every before sign on and before sign off and it was aired until 2014 when the network replaced a network-produced Panalangin ng Bayan in the same year.

The network became the regular exclusive broadcaster of the Olympic Games in the Philippines from Seoul 1988 to Athens 2004 (with the exception of Barcelona 1992). Facing restrictive mandates such as the ban on advertisements and coupled with the exhaustion of its initial capital, the network was nearly unable to broadcast the 2004 games when the International Olympic Committee (IOC) threatened to withhold NBN's broadcast rights to the games because of the network's unpaid debt of $1.2 million from its coverage of the 2000 Sydney Olympics. The Department of Budget and Management were ordered by President Gloria Macapagal-Arroyo to issue a sovereign guarantee for the debt as well as for a portion of the rights fee for the 2004 games, sourcing from various government-owned and controlled corporations. Though the coverage of the 2004 games pushed through, it marked the last time the state-operated network aired the Olympics, with the IOC awarding the rights to succeeding games to private commercial networks such as Solar Entertainment and TV5.

=== 2005–2013: Digital terrestrial transition ===
The government has been testing digital terrestrial television since 2005 through PTV. By 2007, the network has been testing the Japanese ISDB-T standard which was further solidified with the assistance from the Japanese government. The network, being state-operated, was designated for the broadcasting of emergency alerts similar to the Emergency Alert System in the United States, in the style of the Japanese J-Alert system which used the same technology as the one officially adapted by the Philippine government as standard. It was not until January 2017 that the network publicly launched its digital channel.

In 2005, Radyo ng Bayan programs were also aired on the television network. This was particularly revived in 2012 and 2014, with the simulcast of News @ 1 and News @ 6, and the morning news program RadyoBisyon, also simulcasted on IBC-13.

In August 2011, the PTV brand name was re-introduced. On October 6, 2011, the network was officially renamed back to PTV, with new logo and new slogan "Telebisyon ng Bayan" launched on July 2, 2012.

=== 2013–2016: Revitalization act ===
The network's corporate charter was updated in March 2013, through the Republic Act 10390, in an attempt to aid the bleeding PTV. The charter update brought reorganization, and a new infusion of ₱5 billion from the government to revitalize the network and make it "digital competitive." This move raised concern from commercial station GMA Network, fearing that the new law will make PTV a competition. In the first and second quarter of 2014, PTV has generated ₱59 million in revenue.

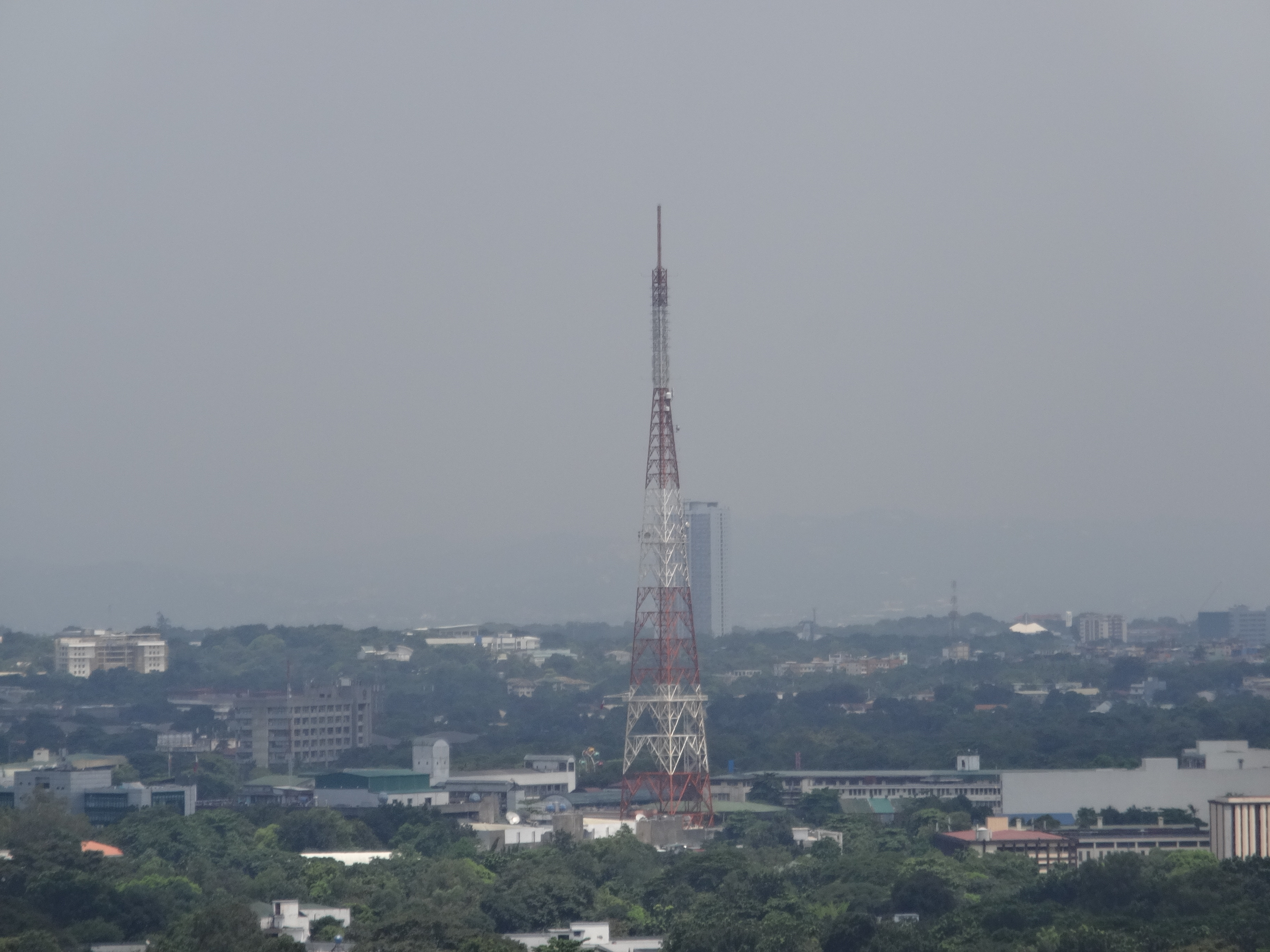
PTV-4 TV tower in Quezon City, photographed 7 September 2017

PTV started their modernization program since 2012, which included the acquisition of studio technical equipment, cameras, vehicles, and high-powered transmitter for its headquarter in Visayas Avenue, Quezon City. This also applied to its regional stations in the cities of Naga and Baguio in Luzon, the cities of Iloilo, Cebu, Calbayog, Tacloban, and Dumaguete in the Visayas, and in the cities of Zamboanga, Cotabato, Pagadian, and Davao in Mindanao.

Around this time, despite being operated with little or no budget, PTV still managed to cover the biggest events in the country including the 2013 Philippine general election, 2013 Bohol earthquake, Typhoon Ondoy (Ketsana), the visits of US President Barack Obama and Pope Francis, the APEC Philippines 2015, and the 2016 Philippine presidential election.

One of the notable efforts to revitalize PTV was the appointment of Albert Bocobo as the general manager. Bocobo, a former Meralco executive, completed his business management degree at the Asian Institute of Management and the National University of Singapore. This experience was instrumental in settling the debt of the network. GM Bocobo determined that the network is losing around ₱14 million monthly. This resulted into requesting the DBM for the immediate release of the budget subsidy for the immediate reorganization of PTV. The network's debt with the Government Service Insurance System (GSIS) resulting from its failure to remit employee contributions were settled through the creation of the GSIS Hour Program, an exchange deal where PTV produced broadcast content for GSIS in exchange for settling the debt. The programming rates were also restructured and marketing was reinforced following a findings that the network's most valuable asset, its air time, is underutilized. As a result, PTV achieved its breakeven point.

Reorganization:

PTV 4 is mandated to reorganize under the new PTV Law (Republic Act No. 10390, dated 14 March 2013) which is a critical step in revitalizing the Network. The inclusion of such provision in the law shows that the government recognizes the importance of people, with the right skills, culture and values, in running a public service organization effectively. No amount of modern technology or well-crafted plan can revive and sustain the Network without a committed team of people and members of the organization who are willing to serve and make things happen. The current organizational set-up of PTV has been overtaken by the fast paced and wide-ranging developments that continue to change the mass media landscape.

After a series of meetings with the Civil Service Commission (CSC) and the Governance Commission for GOCCs (GCG), GM Bocobo was able to secure the approval of the Reorganization Plan on 20 May 2015 – GCG has approved with modifications PTNI’s Reorganization Plan, through GCG Memorandum Order 2015-05 with 65 organizational units and 498 positions.

The new PTV Law (R.A. 10390) provides that the employees who will be affected as a result of the reorganization will receive Separation Benefits equivalent to one (1) month salary for every year of service. They will also receive all other mandated benefits due them from the Network such as commuted (vacation/sick) leave credits. Subsequently, many qualified regular or plantilla employees availed of the plan when Department of Budget and Management (DBM) release the funds necessary to pay for the incentives of the affected employees, through a letter dated 28 September 2015, addressed to Secretary Florencio B. Abad, thru Dir. Lorenzo C. Drapete of the Good Governance Sector of the Department of Budget and Management (DBM).

=== 2016–present: Continuation of digital terrestrial rollout ===
The current PTV wordmark introduced in 2017.

In 2016, following a change in national administration, several board members of PTV, including General Manager Albert Bocobo, tendered their courtesy resignations, leading to another reorganization of the network’s leadership. Subsequent appointments were made to key positions as part of broader management changes. During this period, the network was considered as a primary platform for official government communications, although regular press engagements later resumed. Minor branding adjustments were also introduced, including the discontinuation of the “Telebisyon ng Bayan” slogan. In December 2016, PTV stated its goal of improving its spot by 2017 in television ratings by one notch, the third spot which was held at the time by TV5.

In January 2017, the network improved its signal reception by increasing its power transmitter's output from 25 kW to 60 kW. This was followed by an agreement with Japan-based IT company NEC for the commissioning of new digital transmitters and head-end system for the network's transition to digital terrestrial television.

On January 12, 2017, PTV and Japan-based IT company NEC signed an agreement for the commissioning of new digital transmitters and head-end system for the network's transition to digital terrestrial television (DTT). PTV continued its transition to DTT broadcasting, with the rollout of its first six transmitters in its Manila, Baguio, Naga, Guimaras, Cebu and Davao stations between July 2017 and May 2023. The network hosted the ceremonial switch-on of the networks digital broadcast on January 10, 2018.

The latest branding came in 2017, with the release of a wordmark logo and an emblem that contains elements of the Philippine flag.

=== Proposed transition to public broadcasting model ===
Over the years, there have been plans on making PTV transition towards a public broadcasting model which meant an editorial independence for the network, with BBC in the United Kingdom, PBS in the United States, CBC in Canada, and ABC Australia specifically cited as prime examples. In 2016, teams from the BBC and ABC visited the Philippines for to help in with the plans, though no results from it were made publicly available.

In line with this, there were proposed legislation to consolidate the People’s Television Network and the then Philippine Broadcasting Service into a unified public broadcasting entity. The plan included the development of specialized channels for underserved audiences and the expansion of regional broadcasting infrastructure. As part of these efforts, Salaam TV began test broadcasting in 2017.

== Services ==
=== Radio ===
People's Television (PTV) does not currently operate its own radio broadcasts, but the network has a dedicated channel for simulcasting Radyo Pilipinas programs by Presidential Broadcast Service (PBS), PTV's radio broadcasting counterpart, to television. There were plans to consolidate PTV and PBS into one unified public broadcasting entity over the past years.

=== Television ===
The PTV currently operates three national television channels (technically subchannels):

Current

- PTV – the flagship channel offering general programming including news, public affairs, and cultural shows. It is available in both high-definition (PTV HD1) and standard-definition (PTV SD1) formats to reach a wider audience.
- Radyo Pilipinas 1 – A channel dedicated to simulcasting Radyo Pilipinas 1, the government’s flagship radio news and public service station operated by the PBS.
- PTV Sports – Focused on sports programming, including coverage of national and international events

Former

- Congress TV – A channel dedicated to cover House of Representatives proceedings. The channel moved to IBC from PTV in 2024.
- Salaam TV – A dedicated channel for Filipino Muslims.

While the PTV headquarters in Metro Manila serves as the central hub for nationwide program distribution, the network also operates seven regional stations, each serving a specific region and supported by repeater facilities:

- PTV Manila
- PTV Ilocos Norte
- PTV Cordillera
- PTV Legazpi
- PTV Naga
- PTV Guimaras
- PTV Cebu
- PTV Davao

=== Online and digital ===
The PTV Website is another initiative of People's Television Network to reach out to all Filipinos worldwide using the internet. It is solely maintained by DO of the New Media Unit. The PTV website features free live video streaming of PTV's flagship station programs from Quezon City, Philippines.

== Programming ==
Generally, PTV airs locally produced news and public affairs programs and documentaries, sports, movies, dramas, public service and entertainment programs, in addition to foreign content coming from their counterparts from China, Japan, South Korea and the ASEAN–member countries, and blocktime programs. The network serves as the main television broadcast arm of the government of the Republic of the Philippines and it is part of the Office of the Press Secretary. Its programming is diverse both from IBC and RPN (until October 2012) since PTV focuses on its function as the government's voice, while IBC and RPN (until October 2012) is a general entertainment and public information channel due to its programming.

=== Foreign programming ===
On June 17, 2016, the PTV and Japan signed a 38.20 million yen worth of Cultural Grant Aid and acquisition of programs from NHK to improve the network's overall programming. Within weeks, NHK's Japan Video Topics returned to the channel after several years. However, 1 year later on July 11, 2017, PTV and the Japan International Cooperation Agency (JICA) signed an agreement on another cultural grant aid for the planned broadcast of 600 educational and cultural programs from Japanese state-owned broadcaster NHK in the channel thru the ISDB-T digital TV standard.

On June 3, 2017, PTV began simulcasting CGTN programs, part of its staff having visited its facilities earlier in the year as part of a number of training visits to state and private TV channels worldwide, and later started their full-blown broadcast in 1080i Full HD on their Digital Terrestrial Television Broadcast on April 18, 2018.

their partner government agencies, along with upcoming local and foreign programs, including those from China, Japan, South Korea and the ASEAN Region.

== Controversies ==
On September 5, 2025, veteran broadcast journalist Mike Abe criticized PTV's parent agency, the Presidential Communications Office for alleged corruption, mismanagement, and poor maintenance of its headquarters along Visayas Avenue in Quezon City, which later led to his resignation from the state network.

During the 2026 budget deliberations of the PCO, some senators slammed the network because of its rotting condition which they said was far behind international standards.

In response to Abe's on-air tirades, Secretary Dave Gomez had tasked the new management, led by Chairpersion Vivian Recio and General Manager Malou Choa-Fagar, to improve its facilities and give allowances to its employees.

Gomez had also ordered an investigation of alleged workplace abuse within its News Department, accusing Senior Broadcast Specialist Dominic Almelor of harassment. On November 28, 2025, Almelor was removed from the network following complaints he received from employees.

== See also ==
- Intercontinental Broadcasting Corporation
- Presidential Broadcast Service
- Radio Philippines Network
- Salaam TV (defunct)
