= TARBS World TV =

Defunct Australian television service

- Company type: Private
- Industry: Satellite television
- Founded: 1995
- Defunct: 7 July 2004
- Headquarters: Pyrmont, Australia
- Area served: Australia
- Products: Direct broadcast satellite, pay television, pay-per-view
- Owner: Television And Radio Services Pty Ltd
- Website: www.tarbs.com

Television And Radio Broadcasting System more commonly known as TARBS World TV was an Australian subscription Television Service, broadcasting predominantly ethnic (and mainly non-English) stations into Australia. TARBS commenced operations in 1995 and had around 57,000 subscribers until July 2004 when the company went into receivership.

== TARBS in receivership ==
In July 2004, PanAmSat a major creditor of TARBS applied to have the organisation placed into receivership due to a failure to pay their satellite transponder lease payments.

This action was while PanAmSat was briefly controlled by News Corporation, which was a major investor in TARBS' main competitor Foxtel.

PanAmSat purchased a large number of the assets including the customers Set Top Boxes from the receiver (PriceWaterhouseCoopers) in 2005 and authorised a competing subscription television provider to access and use the boxes already installed in ex-customers homes.

== See also ==
- Subscription television in Australia
