= DWGT-TV =

PTV-4 Manila (DWGT-TV)
- Metro Manila; Philippines
- City: Quezon City
- Channels: Analog: 4 (VHF) (until January 15, 2027; 56 days' time); Digital: 14 (UHF) (ISDB-T); Virtual: 4
- Branding: PTV-4 Manila

Programming
- Subchannels: See list
- Affiliations: 4.01: PTV HD; 4.02: PTV SD; 4.03: Radyo Pilipinas - Radyo Publiko; 4.04: PTV Sports

Ownership
- Owner: People's Television Network, Inc.
- Sister stations: DZKB-TV (RPN); DZTV-TV (IBC); DZRB (Radyo Pilipinas - Radyo Publiko)

History
- Founded: February 2, 1974; 52 years ago
- Former call signs: DZRP-TV (1961–1972); DZXL-TV (1969–1972)
- Former channel numbers: Analog: 10 (VHF, 1961–1972); Digital: 48 (UHF, 2009–2015); 42 (UHF, 2015–2021)
- Former affiliations: PBS (1961–1972); ABS-CBN (1969–1972)
- Call sign meaning: Government Television (former branding)

Technical information
- Licensing authority: NTC
- Power: Analog: 50 kW; Digital: 10 kW
- ERP: Analog: 500 kW; Digital: 20 kW
- Transmitter coordinates: 14°39′16″N 121°2′45″E

Links
- Website: www.ptni.gov.ph

DWGT-TV (VHF channel 4 Analog, UHF channel 14 Digital) is a television station in Metro Manila, Philippines, serving as the flagship of the government-owned People's Television Network. The station maintains studios and hybrid analog/digital transmitting facility at Broadcast Complex, Visayas Avenue, Brgy. Vasra, Diliman, Quezon City. Since March 2023, the transmitter station is also used as a single-frequency network both relay for IBC Manila (DZTV-TV) through DTT UHF channel 17.

== History ==
=== Prior attempts on forming a government station ===
In 1961, the Philippine government, through the Philippine Broadcasting Service (now Presidential Broadcast Service) established a TV station on channel 10, DZRP-TV, which it time-shared with two other organizations. It was financed by government subsidy but had a short life because of channel frequency allocation.

Prior to 1972, the frequency rights of Channel 4 were previously held and operated by one of the ABS-CBN stations in Metro Manila (DZXL-TV 4) when the station moved from channel 9 to channel 4 on November 14, 1969.

=== Martial law era ===
Upon the declaration of martial law, the government seized the properties of ABS-CBN and reopened channel 4 under the auspices of the National Media Production Center on February 2, 1974, as Government Television (GTV). GTV was originally located at the former ABS-CBN Broadcasting Center complex on Bohol (now Sgt. Esguerra) Avenue, Quezon City, which was renamed Broadcast Plaza. In 1976, it began broadcasting in full color — becoming the last national network that transitioned from the then-existing monochrome to color broadcasting. By 1980, GTV became MBS (Maharlika Broadcasting System), a full-blown media machinery for former president Ferdinand E. Marcos, and one of four TV networks in operation.

During the People Power Revolution, on February 24, 1986, rebel forces besieged MBS during a live morning news conference in Malacañang. The network was eventually captured, abruptly ending the broadcast. By 1:25 pm, channel 4 started broadcasting for the people with its massive marathon coverage helmed by Radyo Veritas anchors who were later augmented by other newscasters defecting from their mother stations and former ABS-CBN personnel. At one point, government loyalist forces attempted to retake the station but failed.

=== Contemporary period (since 1986) ===
Two months after Corazon Aquino's accession to the presidency, channel 4 relaunched as the People's Television Network (PTV) after a brief period of broadcasting under the New TV-4 branding. However, PTV's facilities continued to be housed on a major part of ABS-CBN's present studio complex in Bohol (now Sgt. Esguerra) Avenue, Quezon City, becoming the subject of a legal battle between the Lopezes and the government.

To end the scuffle, the Aquino administration, through the Bureau of Broadcast Services which revived the pre-Martial Law Philippine Broadcasting Service, decided to expand the former National Media Production Center building in Visayas Ave. to eventually accommodate PTV.

On January 22, 1992, the station moved its studios to the said complex with transmitters and other equipment largely donated from a grant of the French government. The Broadcast Center on the other hand, was given back to ABS-CBN in order to regain total control over the facility.

On July 16, 2001, PTV was renamed as National Broadcasting Network (NBN). By that time it introduced the country's first two-hour newscast Teledyaryo, and adopted programs that showcase the accomplishments of the Arroyo administration.

As President Benigno Aquino III entered office in June 2010, NBN enhanced its news and programing to viewers nationwide and worldwide through introducing its digital broadcast on ISDB-T channel 48 as the transmitter was rehabilitated and upgraded using advanced transmitter equipment from Harris Corporation of the United States.

In his second State of the Nation Address on July 25, 2011, Aquino called on the government to make plans in re-strengthening PTV as a government broadcaster.

On October 6, 2011, NBN reinstated its original People's Television Network (PTV) brand, followed up by unveiling its new slogan "Telebisyon ng Bayan (People's Television)" on July 2, 2012.

As President Rodrigo Duterte entered office on July 1, 2016, the "Telebisyon ng Bayan" slogan was retired while retaining its 2012 PTV logo. On November 25, 2016, it was officially announced that PTV was under the new management, the network appointed former TV5 production engineering head Dino Apolonio as the network general manager, who was also named network chief operating officer replacing Albert Bocobo (who tendered his courtesy resignation to President Duterte through Presidential Communications Office secretary Martin Andanar on July 7, 2016). The network's board member Josemaria Claro was named network vice chairperson.

On January 4, 2017, PCOO Secretary Martin Andanar announced that PTV's transmitter power output was increased from 25 kW to 60 kW for a clearer and better signal reception.

On April 3, 2017, PTV launched its transitional wordmark logo, its corresponding station ID, and new graphics, Finally, its official logo, which represents the elements of the Philippine flag, was launched upon the station's sign-on on June 28, 2017. The network also launched its new slogan, "Para sa Bayan (For the Nation)", which was already used since July 2016 (prior to the re-branding).

On February 2, 2024, PTV celebrated its 50th anniversary and launched its new slogan, "Ang Pambansang TV Sa Bagong Pilipinas (National TV Network For A New and Better Philippines)".

In November 2025, the National Telecommunications Commission (NTC) issued Memorandum Circular No. 005-11-2025, establishing a 12-month transition period for analog television stations operating in Mega Manila. The covered area includes the National Capital Region and parts of Bulacan, Rizal, Laguna, Cavite, Pampanga and Bataan. In July 2026, the NTC identified November 22, 2026, as the target date for the Mega Manila analog switch-off. The analog shutdown date was extended by the NTC on November 17, 2026, from the original November 22, 2026, it became January 15, 2027.

== Digital television ==
=== Digital channels ===
DWGT-TV broadcasts its digital signal on UHF Channel 14 (473.143 MHz) and is multiplexed into the following subchannels:

Channel	Video	Aspect	Short name	Programming	Note	Power kW (ERP)
4.01	1080i	16:9	PTV HD1	PTV (Main DWGT-TV programming)	Commercial Broadcast	(10 kW)
4.02	480i	16:9	PTV SD1	PTV (Main DWGT-TV programming)	Commercial Broadcast	(10 kW)
4.03	480i	16:9	PTV SD2	Radyo Pilipinas - Radyo Publiko	Commercial Broadcast	(10 kW)
4.04	480i	16:9	PTV SD3	PTV Sports	Commercial Broadcast	(10 kW)
4.31	240p	16:9	PTV 1SEG	PTV	1seg	(10 kW)

Prior to its current DTT channel frequency, PTV was previously using the UHF Channel 48 frequency (677.143 MHz; now being used by Christian Era Broadcasting Service International to broadcast Iglesia ni Cristo Television (INCTV) on analog TV) from its beginning of digital test transmission until the first half of 2015, while TV5 (through its affiliate Nation Broadcasting Corporation) was using UHF Channel 42 before it discontinued. Later on September 7, 2015, PTV moved to UHF Channel 42 frequency (641.143 MHz) until July 15, 2021.

NTC released implementing rules and regulations on the re-allocation of the UHF Channels 14-20 (470–512 Megahertz (MHz) band) for digital terrestrial television broadcasting (DTTB) service. All operating and duly authorized Mega Manila VHF (very high frequency) television networks are entitled to a channel assignment from Channels 14 to 20. On July 16, 2021, PTV began to transmit its digital test broadcast on UHF Channel 14 (473.143 MHz) as its permanent frequency assigned by NTC.

President Rodrigo Duterte on his first State of the Nation Address on July 25, 2016, stated that the government will put up two government-run TV channels for the Muslims and the Lumad, hence Salaam TV was established, while the channel for the Lumad is still being planned.

In addition, the government's official news agency (PNA) is planning to launch its own dedicated news channel on PTV's digital subchannel. Eventually, it launched a late-night newscast called PNA Newsroom airing every midnight on PTV.

=== PTV SD1 ===
Presidential Communications Operations Office began broadcasting its own state owned channel, the OPS TV, in mid-2018. The subchannel features archived and Prior to its standalone channel launch.

== Areas of coverage ==
=== Primary areas ===
- Metro Manila
- Cavite
- Bulacan
- Laguna
- Rizal

=== Secondary areas ===
- Pampanga
- Nueva Ecija
- Portion of Tarlac
- Portion of Zambales
- Portion of Bataan
- Portion of Batangas

== See also ==
- People's Television Network
- List of People's Television Network stations and channels
- Presidential Broadcast Service
- Radyo Pilipinas - Radyo Publiko 738
- Sports Radio 918
- Radyo Magasin 1278

Preceded by DZXL-TV (1969–1972)	DWGT-TV (1974–present)	Succeeded by Incumbent
