= List of radio stations in Davao City =

Below is a list of radio stations in Davao City, whose coverage is in part or whole of the same.

== AM Stations ==
Frequency	Name	Company	Format	Callsign	Power	Location
576 kHz	Bombo Radyo Davao	People's Broadcasting Service, Inc. (operated by Bombo Radyo Philippines)	News, Public Affairs, Talk, Drama	DXMF	10 kW	Davao City
621 kHz	RMN Davao	Radio Mindanao Network, Inc.	News, Public Affairs, Talk, Drama	DXDC	10 kW	Davao City
819 kHz	819 DXUM	Mt. Apo Science Foundation (operated by UM Broadcasting Network)	News, Public Affairs, Talk	DXUM	10 kW	Davao City
855 kHz	Aksyon Radyo Davao	Pacific Broadcasting System, Inc. (operated by MBC Media Group)	News, Public Affairs, Talk	DXGO	10 kW	Davao City
981 kHz	Radyo Pilipino Davao	Radyo Pilipino Corporation	News, Public Affairs, Talk	DXOW	10 kW	Davao City
1017 kHz	Radyo Rapido	Kalayaan Broadcasting System, Inc.	News, Public Affairs, Talk	DXRR	10 kW	Davao City
1071 kHz	Radyo Ronda Davao	Radio Philippines Network, Inc.	News, Public Affairs, Talk, Drama	DXKT	10 kW	Davao City
1125 kHz	Super Radyo Davao	GMA Network, Inc.	News, Public Affairs, Talk, Drama	DXGM	10 KW	Davao City
1197 kHz	1197 DXFE	Far East Broadcasting Company	News, Public Affairs, Talk, Religious Radio	DXFE	10 KW	Davao City
1260 kHz	DZRH Davao (relay from Manila)	MBC Media Group	News, Public Affairs, Talk, Drama	DXRF	10 kW	Davao City

== FM Stations ==
Frequency	Name	RDS ID	Company	Format	Callsign	Power	Location
87.5 MHz	Davao City Disaster Radio	—N/a	City Government of Davao (affiliated by Presidential Broadcast Service)	Contemporary MOR, OPM, Community Radio	DXQQ	10 kW	Davao City
87.9 MHz	Republika Davao	—N/a	Presidential Broadcasting Service	Contemporary MOR, Top 40 (CHR), OPM	DXFO	10 kW	Davao City
88.3 MHz	Energy FM Davao	—N/a	Ultrasonic Broadcasting System, Inc.	Contemporary MOR, OPM	DXDR	10 KW	Davao City
88.7 MHz	Radyo Pilipinas Davao	—N/a	Presidential Broadcast Service	News, Public Affairs, Talk, Government Radio	DXRP	10 kW	Davao City
89.1 MHz	XFM Davao	—N/a	Quest Broadcasting Inc. (operated by Y2H Broadcasting Network, Inc.)	Contemporary MOR, OPM, News/Talk	DXBE	10 KW	Davao City
89.9 MHz	Spirit FM Davao	SpiritFM	Catholic Bishops Conference of the Philippines (operated by Davao Verbum Dei Media Foundation, Inc.)	Religious Radio, Contemporary MOR, OPM	DXGN	10 KW	Davao City
90.7 MHz	Love Radio Davao	—N/a	MBC Media Group	Contemporary MOR, OPM	DXBM	10 KW	Davao City
91.5 MHz	Red Hot Radio (relay from Y101 Cebu)	—N/a	Primax Broadcasting Network (operated by Yes2Health Broadcasting Network)	Top 40 (CHR), OPM	DXKX	10 KW	Davao City
92.3 MHz	Wild FM Davao	WILD FM	UM Broadcasting Network	Contemporary MOR, Dance, OPM	DXWT	10 KW	Davao City
93.1 MHz	Brigada News FM Davao	BRIGADA	Mareco Broadcasting Network, Inc. (operated by Brigada Mass Media Corporation)	Contemporary MOR, OPM, News, Talk	DXAC	10 KW	Davao City
93.9 MHz	iFM News Davao	iFM93.9	Radio Mindanao Network, Inc.	Contemporary MOR, OPM, News	DXXL	10 KW	Davao City
94.7 MHz	Max FM Davao	—N/a	Rizal Memorial Colleges Broadcasting Corporation (operated by Christian Media Management)	Contemporary MOR, Talk	DXLL	10 KW	Davao City
95.5 MHz	Retro Davao	1. RETRO; 2. 95.5 FM	Mt. Apo Science Foundation, Inc. (operated by UM Broadcasting Network)	Classic Hits, OPM	DXKR	10 KW	Davao City
96.3 MHz	Star FM Davao	1. It's All; 2. For You	People's Broadcasting Service, Inc. (operated by Bombo Radyo Philippines)	Contemporary MOR, OPM, News	DXFX	10 KW	Davao City
97.1 MHz	Halo-Halo Radio Davao	UR 97.1	Ultimate Entertainment, Inc.	OPM	DXUR	10 KW	Davao City
98.7 MHz	Home Radio Davao	—N/a	Aliw Broadcasting Corporation	Soft AC	DXQM	10 KW	Davao City
99.5 MHz	Monster BT 99.5	—N/a	Audiovisual Communicators, Inc.	Top 40 (CHR), OPM	DXBT	10 KW	Davao City
100.3 MHz	RJFM Davao (relay from Manila)	—N/a	Free Air Broadcasting Network, Inc.	Adult Hits	DXDJ	10 KW	Davao City
101.9 MHz	FMR Davao	FMR101.9	Nation Broadcasting Corporation (operated by Philippine Collective Media Corporation)	Contemporary MOR, OPM	DXFM	10 KW	Davao City
102.7 MHz	Mango Radio Davao	—N/a	RT Broadcast Specialist Philippines, Inc.	Christian Radio	DXYP	10 kW	Davao City
103.5 MHz	Barangay LS Davao	—N/a	GMA Network, Inc.	Contemporary MOR, OPM, News	DXRV	10 KW	Davao City
104.3 MHz	Hope Radio Davao	—N/a	Century Communications Marketing Center, Inc. (operated by Adventist Media)	Religious Radio	DXMA	10 KW	Davao City
105.1 MHz	Easy Rock Davao	—N/a	Cebu Broadcasting Company (operated by MBC Media Group)	Soft AC	DXYS	10 KW	Davao City
105.9 MHz	Anchor Radio Davao	—N/a	Oriental Mindoro Management Resources Corporation (operated by Berean Bible Baptist Church of Ecoland)	Christian Radio, Religious Radio	DXMX	2 KW	Davao City
106.7 MHz	True FM Davao	1. 106.7 MHz; 2. True FM; 3. Davao FM; 4. 106.7 FM; 5. NBCDavao	Interactive Broadcast Media (operated by TV5 Network Inc.)	News, Talk, Public Affairs	DXET	10 KW	Davao City
107.5 MHz	Win Radio Davao	WINRADIO	Mabuhay Broadcasting System (operated by ZimZam Management)	Contemporary MOR, OPM	DXNU	10 KW	Davao City
