= List of Radio Philippines Network affiliate stations =

These are the nationwide via satellite-reach TV and Radio stations of the Radio Philippines Network (RPTV).

== TV stations ==
=== Analog ===
Branding	Callsign	Channel	Power	Type	Location
RPTV Manila	DZKB	9	50 kW	Originating	RPN South Tower Panay Avenue, Brgy. South Triangle Diliman, Quezon City
RPTV Baguio	DZBS	12	5 kW	Relay	Mt. Sto. Tomas, Tuba, Benguet
RPTV Iriga	DWKI	10	5 kW	Relay	Iriga-Baao Road Brgy. San Nicolas, Iriga
RPTV Bacolod	DYKB	8	5 kW	Relay	Mt. Canlandog, Murcia, Negros Occidental
RPTV Cebu	DYKC	9	5 kW	Relay	RPN Compound M.L. Quezon St., Maguikay, Mandaue
RPTV Zamboanga	DXXX	5	12.5 kW	Relay	Brgy. Tumaga, Zamboanga City
RPTV Davao	DXWW	9	15 kW	Relay	RPN Tower Broadcast Avenue, Shrine Hills, Matina, Davao City

==== Affiliates ====
Branding	Callsign	Channel	Power	Location
RPTV Cebu (Note: Licensed to Nation Broadcasting Corporation.)	DYAN	29	10 kW	TV5 Transmitter Compound, Mt. Busay, Brgy. Babag 1, Cebu City
RPTV Davao	DXAN	29	10 kW	TV5 Heights, Broadcast Ave., Shrine Hills, Brgy. Matina Crossing, Davao City

=== Digital ===
Branding	Callsign	Channel	Frequency	Power	Type	Location
RPTV Manila	DZKB	19	503.143 MHz	5 kW	Originating	Crestview Heights Subdivision, Brgy. San Roque, Antipolo
RPTV Baguio	DZBS	19	503.143 MHz	5 kW	Relay	Mt. Sto. Tomas, Tuba, Benguet

Main and Subchannels of RPTV (Digital)
LCN	Video	Aspect	Name	Programming	Notes
19.02	1080i	16:9	RPTV HD	RPTV	Commercial Broadcast
19.03	480i	4:3	RPN SD Test 1	(SMPTE Color Bars)	Test Broadcast
19.06	180p	16:9	RPTV 1-seg	RPTV	1seg

== Radio stations ==
Branding	Callsign	Frequency	Location
Radyo Ronda Batac	DZRL	639 kHz	Batac
Radyo Ronda Baguio	DZBS	1368 kHz	Baguio
Radyo Ronda Iriga	DZKI	1332 kHz	Iriga
Radyo Ronda Cebu	DYKC	675 kHz	Cebu City
Radyo Ronda Bacolod	DYKB	1404 kHz	Bacolod
Radyo Ronda Davao	DXKT	1071 kHz	Davao City
Radyo Ronda General Santos	DXDX	693 kHz	General Santos
Radyo Ronda Surigao	DXKS	1080 kHz	Surigao City
Radyo Ronda Cagayan de Oro	DXKO	1368 kHz	Cagayan de Oro
Radyo Ronda Dipolog	DXKD	1053 kHz	Dipolog
Radyo Ronda Pagadian	DXKP	1377 kHz	Pagadian
Radyo Ronda Zamboanga	DXXX	1008 kHz	Zamboanga City

== See also ==
- TV5 Network
- RPTV
- Radio Philippines Network
- Nine Media Corporation
