= Retro (disambiguation) =

Retro style is an outdated style or fashion that has become fashionable again.

Retro may also refer to:

== Entertainment ==
- Retro (film), an Indian film
- Retro (TV channel), a Latin American cable television network
- Retro TV, a US network primarily airing classic programming
- Retro Productions, a New York City theater company
- Retro Studios, an American video game developer

== Radio ==
- DWLA-FM, a radio station in Metro Manila, Philippines previously known as Neo Retro 105.9 (2019-2024)
- The Retro network radio branding owned by UM Broadcasting Network in the Philippines:
  - DYCD (103.5 Retro Cebu) in Cebu City
  - DXKR-FM (95.5 Retro Davao) in Davao City

== Music ==
- Retro (EP), a 1978 EP by Ultravox
- Retro (KMFDM album)
- Retro (Lou Reed album)
- Retro (New Order album)
- Retro (Regine Velasquez album)
- Retro, an album by Rick Wakeman

== Sport ==
- Retrô Futebol Clube Brasil, a Brazilian football club

== See also ==
- Retro, a Building Industry Association of Washington workers' compensation insurance program
- Retro, Queensland, a locality in the Central Highlands, Australia
- Retrograde analysis, a type of problem in games, especially chess
- Retrorocket, a rocket engine
- Retrospective, a look back at events that took place, or works that were produced, in the past
