= DXET =

DXET may refer to the following stations in Davao City:

- DXET-FM, an FM radio station branded as True FM
- DXET-TV, a television station branded as TV5
