= DXNP-TV =

DXNP-TV (PTV Davao/PTV Southern Mindanao)
- Metro Davao; Philippines
- City: Davao City
- Channels: Analog: 11 (VHF); Digital: 45 (UHF) (ISDB-T) (Test Broadcast); Virtual: 11
- Branding: PTV Davao/PTV Southern Mindanao

Programming
- Affiliations: 11.01: PTV Davao; 11.02: PTV Manila Feed; 11.03: PTV Sports

Ownership
- Owner: People's Television Network, Inc.
- Sister stations: DXPT-TV (PTV DavNor 48)

History
- Founded: 1962; 64 years ago
- Former call signs: DXRH-TV (1962−1972); DXAW-TV (1974-1986)
- Former channel number: 2 (1974-1986)
- Former affiliations: MBC (1962−1972); SBN (1992-1994)

Technical information
- Licensing authority: NTC
- Power: Analog: 10,000 watts TPO; Digital: 5,000 watts TPO

Links
- Website: www.ptni.gov.ph

DXNP-TV (channel 11) is a television station in Metro Davao, Philippines, serving as the Mindanao flagship of the government-owned People's Television Network. The station maintains studios at the Mindanao Media Hub, Carlos P. Garcia Highway, Bangkal, Davao while its transmitter is located along Broadcast Ave., Shrine Hills, Brgy. Matina Crossing, Davao.

== History ==
- 1962 - DXRH-TV channel 11 was launched by Manila Broadcasting Company until the declaration of Martial Law by President Ferdinand Marcos in 1972.
- 1974 - During the Martial Law era, the station reopened as DXAW-TV and became an owned-and-operated station of the National Media Production Center as Government Television (GTV) under Lito Gorospe and later by then-Press Secretary Francisco Tatad. It was originally broadcast on Channel 2 and it is the first television station in Mindanao.
- 1992 - Channel 11 was later relaunched as the local station of the Southern Broadcasting Network, with call sign changed to DXNP-TV.
- 1994 - After 8 years of being silence of the original channel 2 (eventually, it is now owned and handled by The 5 Network), the station was launched by People's Television Network, Inc. (PTNI).
- July 16, 2001 - Under the new management appointed by President Gloria Macapagal Arroyo, PTNI adopted the name National Broadcasting Network (NBN) carrying new slogan "One People. One Nation. One Vision." for a new image in line with its new programming thrusts, they continued the new name until the Aquino administration in 2010. It became an originating station in Mindanao.
- October 6, 2011 - People's Television Network, Inc. (PTNI) became a primary brand and the branding National Broadcasting Network was retired.
- June 2017 - PTV Davao resumed its operations as PTVisMin, with the airing of the first Visayan hourly newsbreak, PTVismin Newsbreak anchored by former ABS-CBN Davao reporter Elric Ayop. The program also aired on the national feed of PTV since October 2017.
- October 16, 2017 - PTV Davao launched its own 45-minute local newscast PTV News Mindanao with Jay Lagang and Hannah Salcedo as anchors.
- March 5, 2018 - PTV Davao started digital test broadcasts on UHF Channel 45.
- December 5, 2020 - PTV Davao Studios and Offices transferred to the new home at the new Mindanao Media Hub in Bangkal, Davao City. Prior to this, in May 2018, the network was ground breaking for the construction of the new Mindanao Media Hub which houses for PCOO's satellite offices along with its attached agencies including PTV Davao and Radyo Pilipinas Davao and the building was finished in the end of November of the same year.

== Current programs ==
- PTV News Mindanao (afternoon local newscast)
- Pit Stop Pinas
- Straight Shot
- Kadayawan Festival (Yearly)

== Digital television ==
=== Digital channels ===
UHF Channel 45 (659.143 MHz)

Channel	Video	Aspect	Short name	Programming	Note
11.01	1080i	16:9	PTV SD1	PTV Davao (Main DXNP-TV programming)	Test Broadcast (5 kW)
11.02	480i	16:9	PTV SD2	PTV Manila Feed	Test Broadcast (5 kW)
11.03	480i	16:9	PTV SD3	PTV Sports	Test Broadcast (5 kW)
11.04	240p	4:3	PTV 1seg	Gray Screen	1seg

== Areas of coverage ==
=== Primary areas ===
- Davao City
- Davao del Sur
- Davao del Norte

==== Secondary areas ====
- Portion of Davao de Oro

== See also ==
- People's Television Network
- List of People's Television Network stations and channels
- DWGT-TV - the network's flagship station in Manila.
- DXRP-AM
- Republika Ni Juan Davao
