= DYKB-TV =

Television station in Bacolod, the Philippines

DYKB-TV (RPN TV-8 Bacolod/RPTV-8 Bacolod)
- Bacolod; Philippines
- Channels: Analog: 8 (VHF)
- Branding: RPN TV-8 Bacolod; RPTV-8 Bacolod

Programming
- Affiliations: RPTV

Ownership
- Owner: Radio Philippines Network (Nine Media Corporation)
- Operator: TV5 Network, Inc.
- Sister stations: Through TV5: DYTE-TV (TV5); DYBC-TV (One Sports); Through PCO - RPN: DYKB-AM (RPN Radyo Ronda Bacolod 1404)

History
- Founded: October 1971
- Former affiliations: KBS (1971-1975); New Vision 9 (1989-1994); C/S 9 (2008-2009); Solar TV (2009-2011); ETC (2011-2013); Solar News Channel (2013-14); 9TV (2014-2015); CNN Philippines (2015-2024)
- Call sign meaning: DY; Kanlaon; Broadcasting

Technical information
- Licensing authority: NTC
- Power: 5,000 watts TRO
- ERP: 50,480 watts ERP

DYKB-TV, channel 8, is a television station of Radio Philippines Network. Its studios are located at Purok KBS, Pta. Taytay Road, Sum-ag, Bacolod, while transmitter is located at Mt. Canlandog, Murcia, Negros Occidental.

The station started broadcasting in September 1971.

== Digital television ==
=== Digital channels ===
UHF Channel 19 (503.143 MHz)

Channel	Video	Aspect	Short name	Programming	Notes
8.01	1080i	16:9	RPTV HD	RPTV	Test broadcast
8.02	480i	4:3	RPN SD Test 1	(SMPTE Color Bars)	Test broadcast
8.35	240p	16:9	RPTV 1Seg	RPTV	1Seg

Please note that the HD feeds are under RPN on digital TV, while retaining the SD feed under the TV5 DTT stations.

== RPN TV-8 Bacolod previously aired programs ==
- NewsWatch Negros/Western Visayas (1982–1999)

== Area of coverage ==
=== Primary areas ===
- Bacolod
- Negros Occidental

=== Secondary areas ===
- Portion of Iloilo
- Portion of Iloilo City
- Portion of Guimaras

== See also ==
- RPTV
- Radio Philippines Network
- List of Radio Philippines Network affiliate stations
