= DXMM (Davao) =

Former radio station in the Philippines

Davao City; Philippines
- Broadcast area: Davao

Programming
- Format: Silent

Ownership
- Owner: UM Broadcasting Network

History
- First air date: 1963
- Last air date: 1972
- Former frequencies: 810 kHz

Technical information
- Power: 10,000 watts

DXMM (810 AM) was a radio station of UM Broadcasting Network (UMBN) in the Philippines. It was established in 1963 as the third AM station of UMBN after DXMC (now DXWT) and DXUM. The station was shut down under martial law.

Currently, the callsign is assigned to an AM station in Jolo, Sulu.
