= DXCM =

DXCM may refer to:

- DXCM-AM, an AM radio station broadcasting in Kidapawan
- DXCM-FM, an FM radio station broadcasting in Zamboanga City, branded as Love Radio
