= DXFE =

DXFE may refer to:

- DXFE-AM, an AM radio station broadcasting in Davao City
- DXFE-FM, an FM radio station broadcasting in Iligan, branded as Yes FM
