= DWKI-TV =

Television station in Iriga, Philippines

RPN TV-10 Iriga/RPTV-10 Iriga (DWKI-TV)
Relay of DZKB-TV
- Iriga and Naga, Camarines Sur; Philippines
- Channels: Analog: 10 (VHF)
- Branding: RPN TV-10 Iriga; RPTV-10 Iriga

Programming
- Affiliations: RPTV

Ownership
- Owner: Radio Philippines Network (Nine Media Corporation)
- Operator: TV5 Network, Inc.
- Sister stations: Through TV5: DWNA-TV (TV5); DWTU-TV (One Sports); Through PCO - RPN: DZKI (RPN Radyo Ronda Iriga 1332)

History
- Founded: December 1971
- Former affiliations: KBS (1971-1975); New Vision 9 (1989-1994); C/S 9 (2008–2009); Solar TV (2009-2011); ETC (2011-2013); Solar News Channel (2013-2014); 9TV (2014-2015); CNN Philippines (2015-2024)
- Call sign meaning: Kanlaon Broadcasting System/Iriga

Technical information
- Licensing authority: NTC
- Power: 10 Kilowatts
- ERP: 39.48 Kilowatts ERP

DWKI-TV, channel 10, is a television station owned by Radio Philippines Network; TV5 Network, Inc., which operates TV5 affiliate outlet DWNA-TV channel 22 (owned by NBC), operates the station under an airtime lease agreement. Its transmitter is located at Bonacua Building, Iriga-Baao Road, Brgy. San Nicolas, Iriga City, Camarines Sur.

It started in December 1971. This station underwent rehabilitation and is now broadcasting in full power, officially relaunched as RPTV.

== Areas of coverage ==
=== Market audience ===
- Iriga, Naga and the province of Camarines Sur and also throughout Bicol Region (especially in northern Albay)

== See also ==
- RPTV
- Radio Philippines Network
- List of Radio Philippines Network affiliate stations
