= 1197 AM =

AM radio frequency

The following radio stations broadcast on AM frequency 1197 kHz:

== Philippines ==
- DXFE-AM in Davao City
- DYRH in Bacolod, Negros Occidental (now vacant/defunct)
