= DXMV =

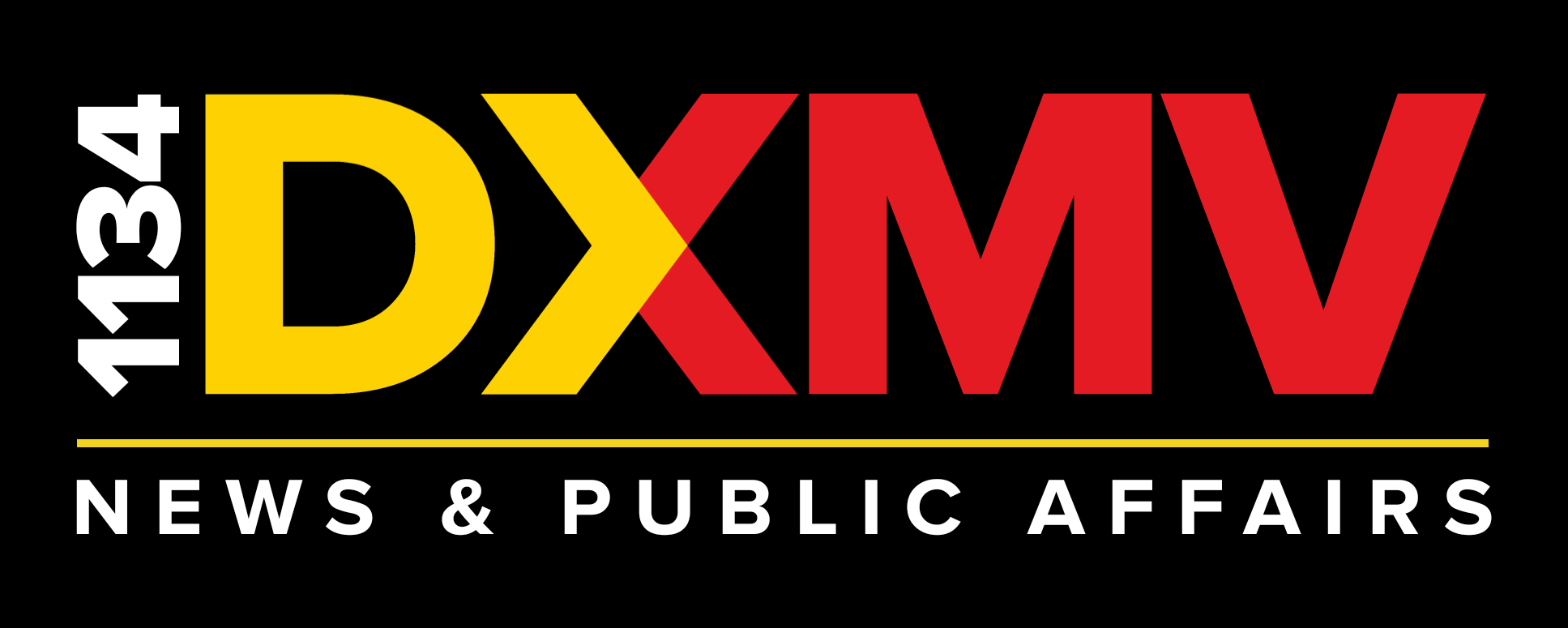

Valencia; Philippines
- Broadcast area: Bukidnon and surrounding areas
- Frequency: 1134 kHz
- Branding: 1134 DXMV

Programming
- Languages: Cebuano, Filipino
- Format: News, Public Affairs, Talk
- Network: UMBN News & Public Affairs

Ownership
- Owner: UM Broadcasting Network
- Sister stations: 92.9 Wild FM

History
- First air date: 1987
- Call sign meaning: Malaybalay and Valencia

Technical information
- Licensing authority: NTC
- Power: 5,000 watts

DXMV (1134 AM) is a radio station owned and operated by UM Broadcasting Network. Its studios and transmitter are in Barangay Poblacion, Valencia, Bukidnon.

From 2000 to June 14, 2020, the Radyo Ukay branding was used. On June 15, 2020, management decided to retire the branding as it has run its course. DXMV, along with its other AM stations, started carrying their perspective call letters in their brandings. The yellow highlighted in the "X" of their logos means to move forward.

== Shutdown ==
On September 17, 2003, DXMV was closed down by then Valencia City Mayor Jose Galario Jr. for allegedly failing to regulate its programs and political slander.

On April 5, 2006, Galario again closed down the station for allegedly operating without a license, though observers claimed that the shutdown was done to halt the broadcast of commentary critical of Galario.
