= DXIL =

Radio station in Iligan, Philippines

Wild FM Iligan (DXIL)
- Iligan; Philippines
- Broadcast area: Lanao del Norte, parts of Lanao del Sur
- Frequency: 103.1 MHz
- Branding: 103.1 Wild FM

Programming
- Languages: Cebuano, Filipino, English
- Format: Contemporary MOR, Dance, OPM
- Network: Wild FM

Ownership
- Owner: UM Broadcasting Network

History
- First air date: 1966 (on AM); March 18, 1992 (on FM)
- Former call signs: DXMI (1966-March 1992)
- Former names: Magic 103 (1992-1997)
- Former frequencies: 1026 kHz (1978–1992)
- Call sign meaning: Iligan

Technical information
- Licensing authority: NTC
- Class: C, D and E
- Power: 5,000 watts
- ERP: 10,000 watts

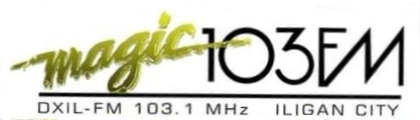
The first logo of DXIL-FM

DXIL (103.1 FM), on-air as 103.1 Wild FM, is a radio station owned by UM Broadcasting Network. The station's studio is located along Bro. Geoffrey Rd., Brgy. Palao, Iligan.
