= DXPT-TV =

PTV DavNor (DXPT-TV)
- Davao del Norte; Philippines
- City: Tagum
- Channels: Analog: 48 (UHF); Digital: TBA (UHF)
- Branding: PTV DavNor 48

Programming
- Language: Cebuano (station-produced programs)
- Affiliations: People's Television Network

Ownership
- Owner: People's Television Network, Inc.; (Provincial Government of Davao del Norte)
- Sister stations: DXNP-TV (PTV-11 Davao)

History
- Founded: June 16, 2017; 9 years ago
- Call sign meaning: People's Television

Technical information
- Licensing authority: NTC
- ERP: 5,000 watts

Links
- Website: www.ptni.gov.ph

DXPT-TV, channel 48, is a local television station which serves as an affiliate of the Philippine government-owned People's Television Network and operated by the Provincial Government of Davao del Norte. Its broadcast facilities are situated at the Provincial Capitol Compound, Brgy. Mankilam, Tagum City, Davao del Norte.

PTV DavNor 48's programs mainly focused on the projects and programs of the Davao del Norte's government under the leadership of Governor Edwin Jubahib, exclusive coverage of the province's festivities and events, and local newscasts. In-house programs from the mother station of PTV in Metro Manila (including Rise and Shine Pilipinas, Sentro Balita, Ulat Bayan and PTV News Tonight) are also shown in the station.

== History ==
On October 28, 2016, PTV and the Provincial Government of Davao del Norte signed a memorandum of agreement to operate a local television station in the province by PTV General Manager Dino Apolonio and Governor Anthony Del Rosario together with Provincial information officer Sofonias Gabonada Jr and its first station Manager Mr. Billy Danryll Dulatre, as part of the commemoration of the Press Freedom Month.

PTV DavNor 48's license to operate issued by the National Telecommunications Commission (BSD-0176–2017) was approved on March 15, 2017, and expires on March 14, 2020. Two months later, On June 16, 2017, PTV DavNor 48 officially commenced its broadcasts, in time for the 50th Anniversary of the establishment of Davao del Norte.

== Programs ==
=== Currently aired programs ===
- PTV News Davao del Norte - flagship weekly newscast featuring news and events from the Provincial Government of Davao del Norte Philippines
- Kasamtangang Katikaran sa Kalambuan (KKK)
- One DavNor Patrol
- UsaPangkalusugan
- Quinta Balita
- E2E Konek
- Explore DavNor
- DavNor Sayron Ta
- Kapihan sa Kapitolyo
- Abante Norte
- Bida ang Bata
- Game Na!
- The Weekly Groove with One DavNor Band
- Talentadong Batang Dabaonon
- DavNor Weather Update
- Yes sa Probinsya
- Sangguniang Panlalawigan
- One DavNor Patrol

=== Previous aired programs ===
- LakwaCha
- UsaPangkalusugan
- DepEd TV: Eskwela, Tara Na!

== Areas of coverage ==
- Davao del Norte (excluding Samal)
- Parts of Davao de Oro

== See also ==
- People's Television Network
- List of People's Television Network stations and channels
