= DXRT =

Radio station in General Santos, Philippines

Wild FM General Santos (DXRT)
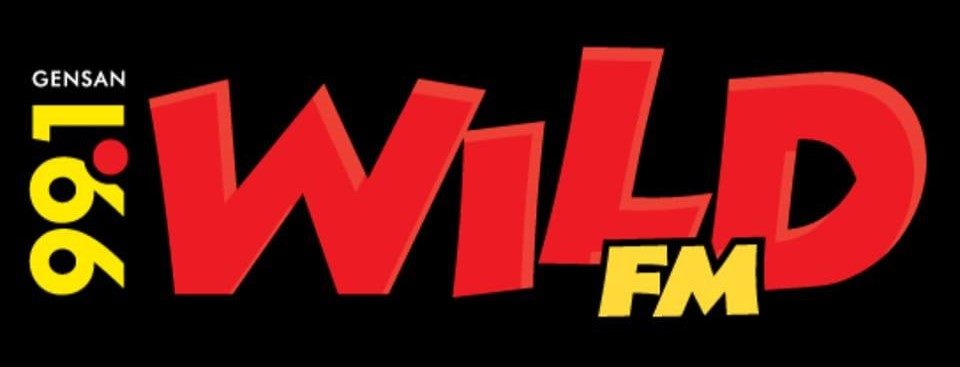
- Logo since 2023
- General Santos; Philippines
- Broadcast area: South Cotabato, Sarangani and surrounding areas
- Frequency: 99.1 MHz
- Branding: 99.1 Wild FM

Programming
- Languages: Cebuano, Filipino, English
- Format: Contemporary MOR, Dance, OPM
- Network: Wild FM

Ownership
- Owner: UM Broadcasting Network

History
- First air date: 1964 (on AM); 1992 (on FM)
- Former call signs: DXMZ (1964–1992); DXXB (1992-1996)
- Former names: XB95 (1992-1996)
- Former frequencies: 95.3 MHz (1992-1996)
- Call sign meaning: Roberto Torres

Technical information
- Licensing authority: NTC
- Power: 5,000 watts

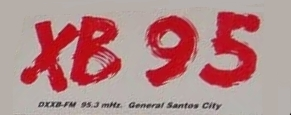
XB 95 logo from 1992 to 1996

DXRT (99.1 FM), broadcasting as 99.1 Wild FM, is a radio station owned and operated by UM Broadcasting Network. The station's studio and transmitter are located at the 3rd Floor, Nelens Bldg., J. Catolico St., General Santos.
