= DZBS-TV =

Television station in Baguio, the Philippines

RPN Benguet RPN Northern Luzon RPTV-12 Benguet (DZBS-TV)
- Baguio; Philippines
- Channels: Analog: 12 (VHF); Digital: 19 (UHF) (ISDB-T) (test broadcast); Virtual: 12
- Branding: RPN TV-12 Benguet; RPN TV-12 Northern Luzon; RPTV-12 Benguet

Programming
- Subchannels: See list
- Affiliations: RPTV

Ownership
- Owner: Radio Philippines Network (Nine Media Corporation)
- Operator: TV5 Network, Inc.
- Sister stations: Through TV5: DZET-TV (TV5); DZYB-TV (One Sports); Through PCO - RPN: DZBS (RPN Radyo Ronda Baguio 1368)

History
- Founded: December 1962
- Former affiliations: KBS (1969-1975); NV9 (1989-1994); C/S 9 (2008-2009); Solar TV (2009-2011); ETC (2011-2013); Solar News Channel (2013-2014); 9TV (2014-2015); CNN Philippines (2015-2024)
- Call sign meaning: "Broadcasting System"

Technical information
- Licensing authority: NTC
- Power: 10 kW (analog); 5kW (digital)
- ERP: 120 kW (analog); 25 kW (digital)

DZBS-TV, channel 12, is a television station in Northern Luzon, Philippines of the RPTV network. It is owned by Radio Philippines Network; TV5 Network, Inc., which owns TV5 outlet DZET-TV (channel 28), operates the station under an airtime lease agreement. The station's transmitter is located at Mt. Sto. Tomas, Tuba, Benguet Province.

The station started broadcasting in December 1962.

== Digital television ==
=== Digital channels ===
UHF Channel 19 (503.143 MHz)

Channel	Video	Aspect	Short name	Programming	Notes
12.01	1080i	16:9	RPTV HD	RPTV	Test broadcast
12.02	480i	4:3	RPN SD Test 1	SMPTE Color Bars	Test broadcast
12.35	240p	16:9	RPTV 1Seg	RPTV	1Seg

Please note that the HD feeds are under RPN on digital TV, while retaining the SD feed under the TV5 DTT stations.

== Areas of coverage ==
=== Primary areas ===
- Baguio
- Benguet
- La Union
- Pangasinan

=== Secondary areas ===
- Portion of Nueva Ecija
- Tarlac
- Portion of Ilocos Sur
- Portion of Zambales

== Previously aired programs ==
- Kapampangan News (via CNN PH national feed)
- Itanong Mo Kay Soriano

== See also ==
- Radio Philippines Network
- List of Radio Philippines Network affiliate stations
