= DXRP =

Radio station in Davao City, Philippines

Radyo Pilipinas Davao (DXRP)
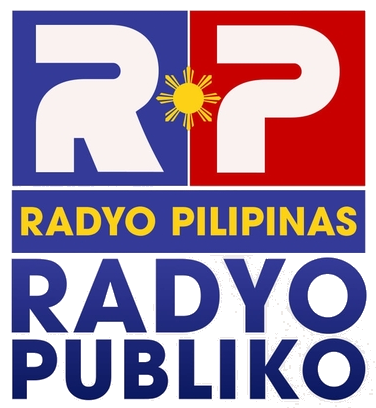
- Davao City; Philippines
- Broadcast area: Davao Region and the surrounding areas
- Frequency: 88.7 MHz
- Branding: Radyo Pilipinas

Programming
- Languages: Cebuano, Filipino
- Format: News, Public Affairs, Talk, Government Radio
- Network: Radyo Pilipinas

Ownership
- Owner: Philippine Broadcasting Service
- Sister stations: Republika Ni Juan Davao

History
- First air date: 1965
- Former frequencies: 1100 kHz (1965–1978); 675 kHz (1978–2018)
- Call sign meaning: Republic of the Philippines

Technical information
- Licensing authority: NTC
- Power: 10,000 watts

Links
- Webcast: DXRP Radyo Pilipinas LIVE Audio
- Website: PBS

DXRP (88.7 FM), on-air as Radyo Pilipinas, is a radio station owned and operated by the Presidential Broadcast Service. Its studios are located at the Mindanao Media Hub Building, Carlos P. Garcia Highway, Bangkal, Davao City, and its transmitter is located at Broadcast Ave., Shrine Hills, Matina, Davao City.

From February to August 2018, following the preparation of the Mindanao Broadcast Hub, DXRP was temporarily broadcasting on FM at 87.5 MHz (this frequency broadcasts as Davao City Disaster Radio) while currently looking for a new transmitter location for its main frequency on its AM counterpart. In August 2018, it transferred its frequency to 88.7 MHz, coinciding with the launched of 87.5 FM1 Davao.

On December 5, 2020, the studios of Radyo Pilipinas Davao, along with its sister station Republika FM1 Davao, transferred to the new home at the new Mindanao Media Hub in Bangkal, Davao City.
