= DXSC =

Defunct radio station in Zamboanga City, Philippines

- Zamboanga City; Philippines
- Broadcast area: Zamboanga City, Basilan and surrounding areas
- Frequency: 819 kHz

Programming
- Format: Silent

Ownership
- Owner: Southern Philippines Mass Communication

History
- First air date: 1965 (as DXRC); 1973 (as DXSC)
- Last air date: September 10, 2005
- Former call signs: DXRC (1965–1973)
- Former frequencies: 890 kHz (1965-1978)
- Call sign meaning: Southern Command

Technical information
- Licensing authority: NTC

DXSC (819 AM) was a radio station owned and operated by Southern Philippines Mass Communication. Its studios were located inside the 4CRG Compound, Camp General Basilio Navarro, Brgy. Upper Calarian, Zamboanga City.

It was formerly owned by UM Broadcasting Network as DXRC in Malaybalay from 1965 to 1972, when it closed down during Martial Law. Its equipment were donated to Southern Command in Zamboanga City the following year, and began its operations as DXSC. On September 10, 2005, it transferred its operations to FM.
