= DXWB =

DXWB (Wild FM Bukidnon)
Valencia; Philippines
- Broadcast area: Bukidnon and surrounding areas
- Frequency: 92.9 MHz
- Branding: 92.9 Wild FM

Programming
- Languages: Cebuano, Filipino, English
- Format: Contemporary MOR, Dance, OPM
- Network: Wild FM

Ownership
- Owner: UM Broadcasting Network
- Sister stations: DXMV

History
- First air date: 1988
- Call sign meaning: Wild FM Bukidnon

Technical information
- Licensing authority: NTC
- Power: 5,000 watts
- ERP: 10,000 watts

Links
- Webcast: http://www.amfmph.com/wild-fm-valencia-dxwb-92-9-mhz-13254.html

DXWB (92.9 FM), broadcasting as 92.9 Wild FM, is a radio station owned and operated by UM Broadcasting Network. Its studios and transmitter are located in Brgy. Poblacion, Valencia, Bukidnon. The station broadcasts daily from 4:30 AM to 12:00 AM.
