= DXMX =

Radio station in Davao City, Philippines

Anchor Radio Davao (DXMX)
- Davao City; Philippines
- Broadcast area: Metro Davao and surrounding areas
- Frequency: 105.9 MHz
- Branding: 105.9 Anchor Radio

Programming
- Languages: Cebuano, Filipino, English
- Format: Religious Radio

Ownership
- Owner: Oriental Mindoro Management Resources Corporation
- Operator: Berean Bible Baptist Church of Ecoland

History
- First air date: 2000
- Former names: Mix FM (2000–February 28, 2013); Power FM (March 1, 2013–February 28, 2014); Balita FM (March 1, 2014–October 1, 2016)
- Former frequencies: Anchor Radio: 101.1 MHz (2023–2025)
- Call sign meaning: Mix FM (former brand)

Technical information
- Licensing authority: NTC
- Power: 2,000 watts

DXMX (105.9 FM), broadcasting as 105.9 Anchor Radio, is a radio station owned by Oriental Mindoro Management Resources Corporation and operated by Berean Bible Baptish Church of Ecoland. The station's studio and transmitter are located at the 3rd & 4th Floor, Lim Bldg., 4th St. cor. Tulip Dr., Ecoland Subdivision Phase 1, Davao City.

== History ==
=== 2000–2013: Mix FM ===
The station was established in 2000 by former Magic 89.9 personality and former head of the Presidential Broadcasting Service, Rizal "Bong" Aportadera, Jr. (known on-air as "Sonny B"), and Randall Ong as Red Hot Mix FM 105.9. Aportadera once served as city information officer at Davao City's local government. Back then, it was located at the Doors 4 and 5, RJ Homes Bldg., Pelayo St. In 2005, the "Red Hot" was eventually dropped and it was simply known as "105.9 Mix FM". On that same year, Mix FM became the number one radio station in the city.

In addition, Mix FM added legendary Los Angeles radio disc jockey Rick Dees, who hosts the Rick Dees' Weekly Top 40 countdown. Also, the station hosting several events in DC such as House Party and Sikat!.

On February 28, 2013, after 13 years of existence, Mix FM signed off for the last time at 10:59pm. Its last song was "Keeping the Dream Alive" by Münchener Freiheit.

=== 2013–2014: Power FM ===
On March 1, 2013, under new management, the station was relaunched as Power FM and switched to a news and music format. Dubbed as "The all in one station", it featured news & commentaries in the morning, music during mid-morning to evenings & blocktimers during the rest of the day.

Power FM ranked #4 in Davao City, based on the recent Kantar Media Radio Research Council Survey. As a result, the management decided to make some changes. On February 28, 2014, Power FM made its final broadcast.

=== 2014–2016: Balita FM ===
105.9 Balita FM (2014 - 2016)

On March 1, 2014, the station rebranded as Balita FM and added more news & talk programs. It faced competition with Radyo5, Brigada News FM and Radyo ni Juan.

On October 1, 2016, Balita FM went off the air for unknown reasons.

Davao City Disaster Radio, owned by the Davao City LGU, utilized its former studios from its inception until the second quarter of 2021, when it transferred to the City Hall Annex Building.

From 2022 to 2025, the frequency was used by a radio station in Digos.

=== 2025–present: Anchor Radio ===
In July 2025, it became a relay of 101.1 Anchor Radio of Berean Bible Baptist Church of Ecoland. In October, it transferred its operations to this frequency.

== Awards ==
- KBP Golden Dove Awards - People's Choice for Best FM Station (Mindanao Category) (2005)
