= DXOW =

Radio station in Davao City, Philippines

Radyo Pilipino Davao (DXOW)
- Davao City; Philippines
- Broadcast area: Davao Region and surrounding areas
- Frequency: 981 kHz
- Branding: DXOW Radyo Pilipino

Programming
- Languages: Cebuano, Filipino
- Format: News, Public Affairs, Talk
- Network: Radyo Pilipino

Ownership
- Owner: Radyo Pilipino Corporation

History
- First air date: 1962
- Former call signs: DXMT (1962–1980)
- Former names: Sariling Atin; Radyo Asenso
- Former frequencies: 930 kHz (1962–1978)

Technical information
- Licensing authority: NTC
- Power: 10,000 watts

DXOW (981 AM) Radyo Pilipino is a radio station owned and operated by Radyo Pilipino Corporation. The station's studio and transmitter are located at Pearl St, Gem Village, Maa, Davao City.

== History ==
Established in 1962 under the call letters DXMT, it was the first Golden Sound in the airwaves of Davao City. At that time, it was owned by former Sen. Rene Espina under Mindanao Times. Years later, it carried the slogan Sariling Atin. On June 15, 1980, RadioCorp acquired the station and changed its call letters to DXOW. During its first 5 years, it was among the top stations in the city.

By late 1980s, the station was reported to be heard in Southern Mindanao and Bukidnon, reaching as far as Indonesia and Australia.

== Notable personalities ==
Among those broadcasters in the station was Jun Pala, a popular commentator who served as Alsa Masa chief spokesperson. Pala was known for denouncing communism and for his on-air attacks on those who were not supporting the said vigilante group, all being broadcast daily within up to five hours. Due to death threats he had received, he was reported bringing guns, a grenade, and his security squad of former communists.

He once got the ire of the members of Kapisanan ng mga Brodkaster ng Pilipinas because of his threats to the local KBP members who had reprimanded him to "tone down" his on-air tirades. On the other hand, the military commended him for his role to the success of anti-insurgency campaign in Mindanao; and gained support from six anti-communist groups in the region and some members of Moro National Liberation Front–Davao command.

Sometime in early 1987, he launched a program in what was called the largest anti-communist media campaign in the island, which reportedly contributed to the surrender of at least 10,000 communists and sympathizers in the city, and to the popularity of Alsa Masa.

Ferdie Lintuan, also a commentator, had a morning program by mid-2000s. A critic of the communists and the vigilantes, he formerly worked at DXRA where he survived the deadly 1987 attack by communist rebels.

Pala and Lintuan, who worked later with another station after their stays, were shot dead in 2003 and 2007, respectively.
