= DXWW-TV =

Television station in Davao, Philippines

RPN TV-9 Davao/RPTV-9 Davao (DXWW-TV)
- Metro Davao; Philippines
- City: Davao City (analog transmitter)
- Channels: Analog: 9 (VHF)
- Branding: RPTV Channel 9 Davao; RPN TV-9 Davao

Programming
- Affiliations: RPTV

Ownership
- Owner: Radio Philippines Network (Nine Media Corporation)
- Operator: TV5 Network, Inc.
- Sister stations: Through TV5: DXET-TV (TV5); DXAN-TV (RPTV mirror feed); DXET-FM (106.7 True FM); Through PCO - RPN:: DXKT-AM (RPN Radyo Ronda Davao 1071)

History
- Founded: July 1974
- Former channel numbers: Analog: 4 (VHF, 1974–1988); 2 (VHF, 1988–1993)
- Former affiliations: KBS (1972–1975); New Vision 2/9 (1989–1994); C/S 9 (2008–2009); Solar TV (2009–2011); ETC (2011–2013); Solar News Channel (2013–2014); 9TV (2014–2015); CNN Philippines (2015–2024)
- Call sign meaning: DXWW (none; sequentially assigned)

Technical information
- Licensing authority: NTC
- Power: 40 kW
- ERP: 150 kW
- Repeater: DXAN-TV channel 29

DXWW-TV (channel 9) is a television station in Metro Davao, Philippines, serving as the Mindanao flagship of the RPTV network. It is owned by Radio Philippines Network; TV5 Network, Inc., which owns TV5 outlet DXET-TV (channel 2, DXWW-TV's former frequency), operates the station under an airtime lease agreement. The station's transmitter is located at Broadcast Avenue, Shrine Hills, Matina, Davao City.

== History ==
- July 1974 – DXWW-TV launched on July 1974 on Channel 4 after Roberto Benedicto sequestered DXAW-TV from ABS-CBN. It was RPN's first Mindanao TV station - their TV outlets in Zamboanga and Cagayan de Oro (now defunct as of 2014) followed in 1978 and 1980, respectively - and the fourth TV station launched in Davao.
- March 1986 - DXWW-TV along with other RPN TV stations was sequestered by the government but continued broadcast until 1988.
- July 1988 – RPN acquired Channel 2 in preparation for ABS-CBN's return on Channel 4.
- August 1988 – RPN moved to Channel 2 after ABS-CBN regained Channel 4 as DXAS-TV.
- Early 1993 – RPN acquired Channel 9 and sold Channel 2 to the Associated Broadcasting Company (now TV5) as DXET-TV.
- July 1993 – RPN moved to Channel 9 coinciding the launch of DXET-TV.

== Areas of coverage ==
- Davao del Norte (including Samal)
- Davao City
- Davao del Sur

== Previously aired programs ==
- Oras Ng Himala

== See also ==
- Radio Philippines Network
- Nine Media Corporation
- TV5 Network
- RPTV
- List of Radio Philippines Network affiliate stations
