= DXAN-TV =

DXAN-TV (RPTV 29 Davao)
- Metro Davao; Philippines
- City: Davao City
- Channels: Analog: 29 (UHF); Digital: DXET-TV 18 (UHF) (test broadcast); Virtual: 2.02
- Branding: RPTV 29 Davao

Programming
- Affiliations: RPTV

Ownership
- Owner: Nation Broadcasting Corporation
- Operator: TV5 Network, Inc.
- Sister stations: Through TV5: DXET-TV (TV5); DXWW-TV (RPTV Main feed); 106.7 True FM; Through NBC: FM Radio 101.9 (operated by PCMC)

History
- Founded: January 1, 2001
- Former affiliations: MTV Philippines (2001-07); AksyonTV (2011-19); 5 Plus (2019-20); One Sports (2020-24)

Technical information
- Licensing authority: NTC
- Power: 10 kW
- ERP: 124.70 kW ERP

Links
- Website: www.onesports.ph

DXAN-TV (channel 29) is a television station in Metro Davao, Philippines, serving as the UHF translator of RPTV 9 Davao affiliated with Radio Philippines Network. It is owned by Nation Broadcasting Corporation; TV5 Network, Inc., which owns TV5 outlet DXET-TV (channel 2), operates the station under an airtime lease agreement. Both stations share studios and transmitters at TV5 Heights, Broadcast Ave., Shrine Hills, Brgy. Matina Crossing, Davao City.

== See also ==
- RPTV
- List of RPTV stations
