= DYCD =

Radio station in Cebu City, Philippines

Retro Cebu (DYCD)
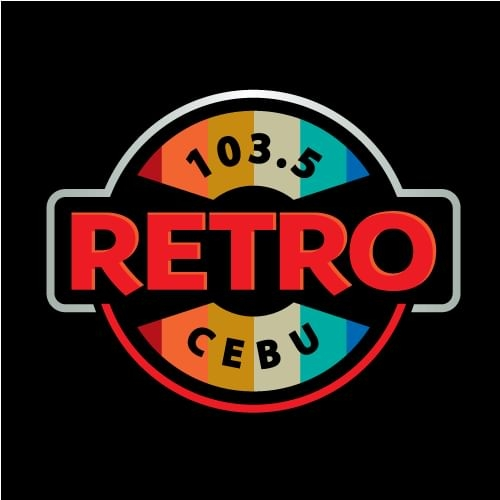
- Cebu City; Philippines
- Broadcast area: Metro Cebu and surrounding areas
- Frequency: 103.5 MHz
- Branding: 103.5 Retro Cebu

Programming
- Language: English
- Format: Classic hits, OPM

Ownership
- Owner: UM Broadcasting Network; (Ditan Communications)

History
- First air date: 1995
- Former names: Kiss FM (1995-August 2002); Wild FM (August 2002-January 2015)
- Call sign meaning: Cebu's Ditan

Technical information
- Licensing authority: NTC
- Class: A, B, C
- Power: 10,000 watts
- ERP: 20,524 watts

Links
- Webcast: Listen Live

DYCD (103.5 FM), broadcasting as 103.5 Retro Cebu, is a radio station owned and operated by Ditan Communications, a subsidiary of UM Broadcasting Network. The station's studio and offices are located at Room 309, 3rd Floor, Doña Luisa Bldg., Fuente Osmeña, Cebu City, and its transmitter is located at Brgy. Kalunasan, Cebu City. This station operates 24/7.

== History ==
=== 1995-2002: Kiss FM ===
The station was established in 1995 as 103.5 Kiss FM. Dubbed as "Philippines' first digital FM radio", it aired a Top 40 format. It was manned by former ABC 21 Cebu broadcast journalist Elmer Rivera Karaan, known on-air as Antique "AJ" Joe. Back then, it was located at the 4th level of Ayala Center Cebu.

=== 2002-2015: Wild FM ===
Wild FM logo from 2002 to 2010

Wild FM Cebu used to be on 105.9 FM under the call letters DYWC from 1994 to 2000. In August 2002, the station was acquired by UMBN from Ditan Communications and was relaunched as 103.5 Wild FM with its first site at the University of San Carlos main campus along Pelaez St.

Wild FM logo from 2011 to 2015

On March 27, 2005, Wild FM moved to a new site at Doña Luisa Bldg., Fuente Osmeña, uptown Cebu.

On late January 2015, after almost 12 years on the air, Wild FM quietly ended its broadcast and went off the air for a month.

=== 2015-present: Retro Cebu ===
On March 16, 2015, the station resumed its broadcast, this time as 103.5 Retro Cebu with a classic hits format. A year later, the Retro was adapted by its Davao station.

At the evening of December 16, 2021, the station went off the air for the second time following the aftermath of Typhoon Odette. On January 14, 2022, it resumed operations after power was restored in Doña Luisa Bldg.
