= DXQM =

Radio station in Davao City, Philippines

Home Radio Davao (DXQM)
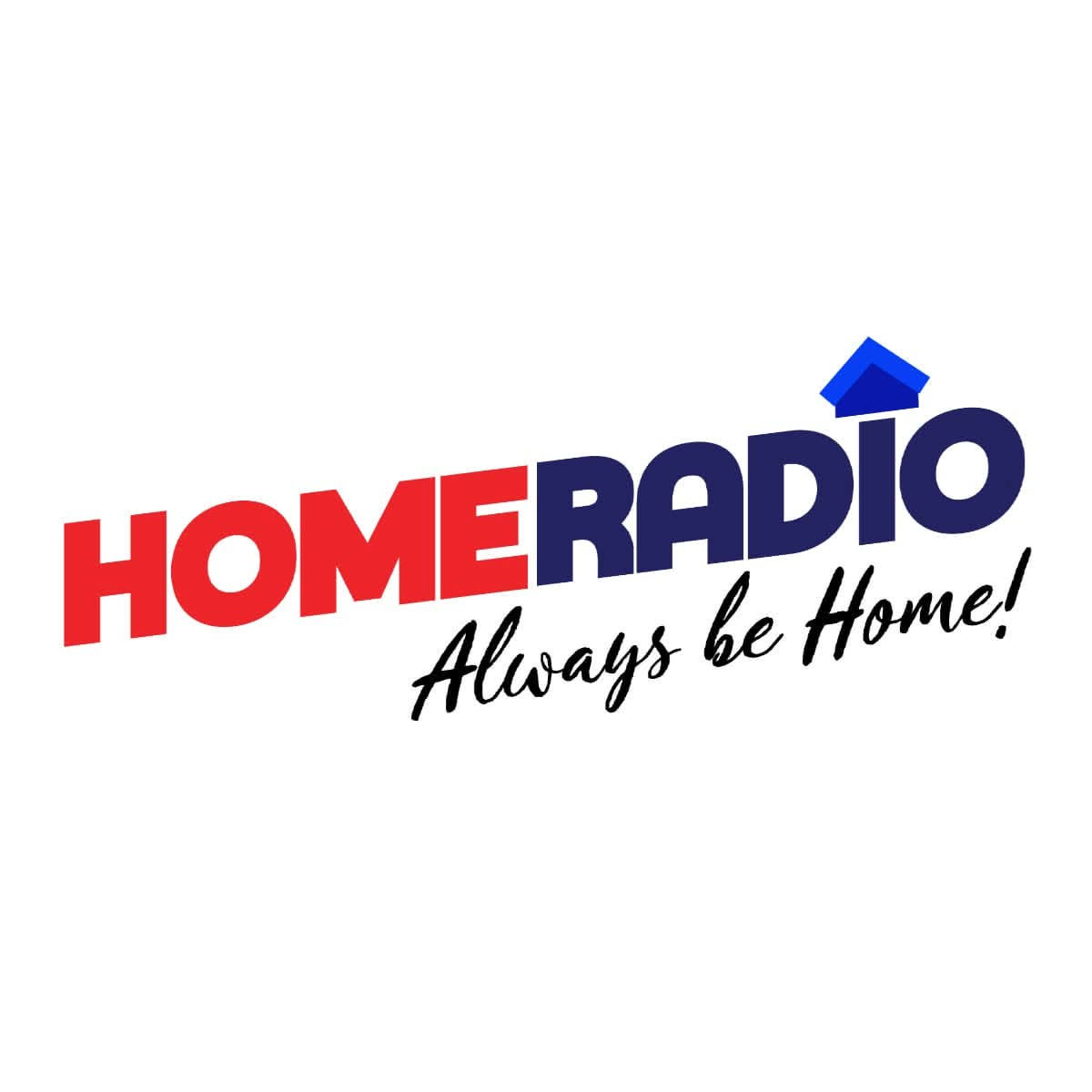
- Davao City; Philippines
- Broadcast area: Metro Davao and surrounding areas
- Frequency: 98.7 MHz
- Branding: 98.7 Home Radio

Programming
- Language: English
- Format: Soft adult contemporary
- Network: Home Radio

Ownership
- Owner: Aliw Broadcasting Corporation

History
- First air date: December 22, 1997
- Former names: Q98 (1997-2000); DWIZ (2023–26)

Technical information
- Licensing authority: NTC
- Power: 10,000 watts
- ERP: 20,000 watts

Links
- Website: 987 Home Radio Official Website

DXQM (98.7 FM), broadcasting as 98.7 Home Radio, is a radio station owned and operated by Aliw Broadcasting Corporation. The station's studio and transmitter are located at DXQM Compound, Broadcast Avenue, Shrine Hills, Matina, Davao City.

== History ==
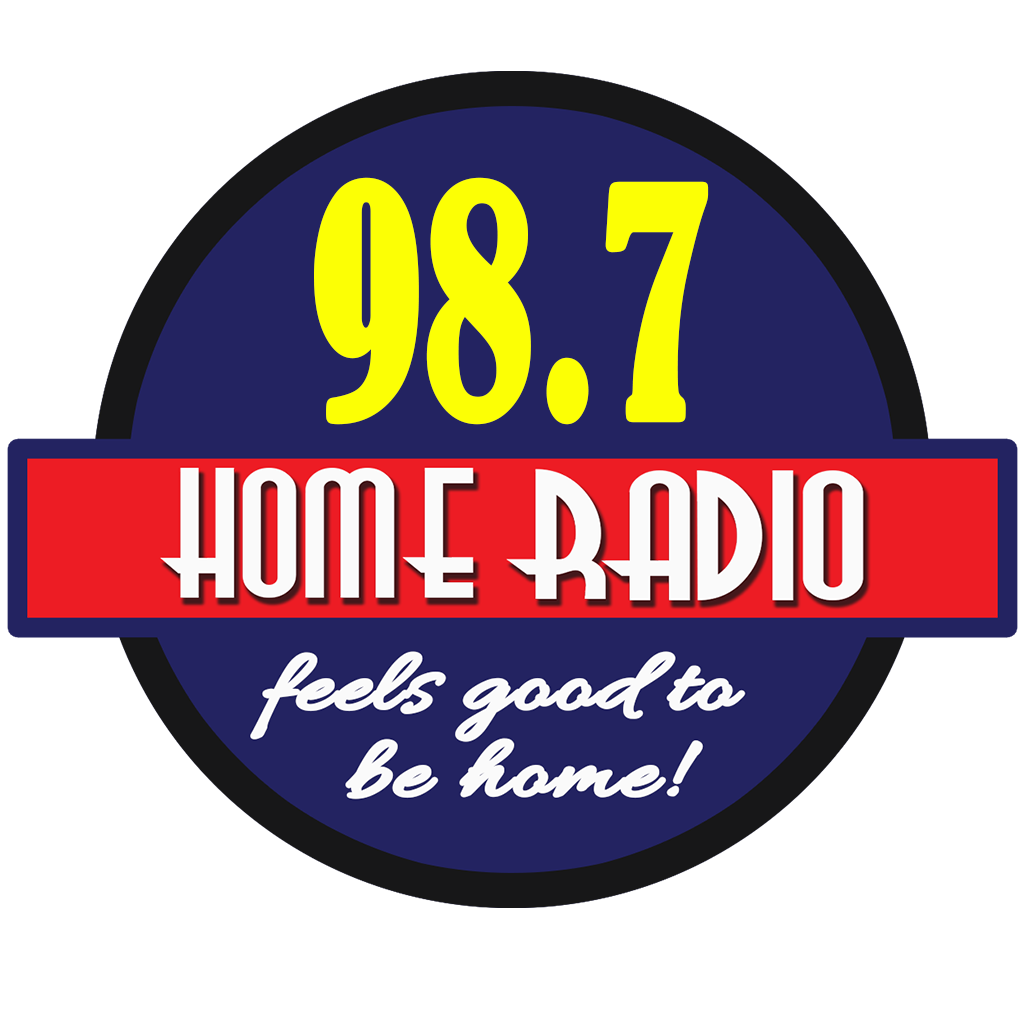
Home Radio Davao logo from July 2017 to January 2023.

The station first went on air on December 22, 1997 as Q98. In 2000, it rebranded as 98dot7 Home Radio. Back then, it was located in ATU Plaza Commercial Mall along Gov. Duterte St. On August 1, 2016, it was relaunched as Home Radio News FM and added news to its format. In 2021, the station's transmitter facilities relocated to Shrine Hills. On January 30, 2023, it was relaunched under the DWIZ network. On April 30, 2026, DWIZ News FM made its final broadcast. On May 8, after a week of music automation, it was relaunched under the Home Radio network.
