= DZRL =

Radyo Ronda Batac (DZRL)
- Batac; Philippines
- Broadcast area: Ilocos Norte and surrounding areas
- Frequency: 639 kHz
- Branding: RPN DZRL Radyo Ronda

Programming
- Languages: Ilocano, Filipino
- Format: News, Public Affairs, Talk, Drama
- Network: Radyo Ronda

Ownership
- Owner: Radio Philippines Network

History
- First air date: 1959
- Former frequencies: 630 kHz (1959–1978)
- Call sign meaning: Radio Laoag

Technical information
- Licensing authority: NTC
- Power: 10,000 watts

Links
- Website: Official Website

DZRL (639 AM) Radyo Ronda is a radio station owned and operated by the Radio Philippines Network. Its studios, offices, and transmitter are located at the RP Building, Brgy. #13 Baay, City of Batac. It is the pioneer AM radio station in the province.

== History ==
DZRL is the first radio station in Ilocos Norte established in 1959. It was first located at Bueno Bldg. in Laoag until 1971.

In 1972, when Martial Law was implemented, Kanlaon Broadcasting System took over the ownership of the station and relocated it Mangapit Bldg. in Batac, in front of Eureka High School, equipped with a brand new NEC transmitter. At that time, the said city was the fastest growing municipality in the province. The following year, DZRL transferred to its current home at Brgy. Caunayan, Batac, which is a stone's throw away from the Batac Campus of the Mariano Marcos State University.

In 2019, DZRL found its new home at RP (Arpee) Bldg. In Barangay #13 Baay in Batac under leadership of Mr. Rodrigo “Rod” Sadian as Officer-in-Charge Station Manager.

DZRL is the only radio station in the province whose operation was not disrupted during Martial Law, making it as the most listened to radio station in the province at that time.
