= DXRF =

Radio station in Davao City, Philippines

Relay of DZRH Manila
- Davao City; Philippines
- Broadcast area: Davao Region and surrounding areas
- Frequency: 1260 kHz
- Branding: DZRH

Programming
- Language: Filipino
- Format: News, Public Affairs, Talk, Drama

Ownership
- Owner: MBC Media Group
- Sister stations: DXGO Aksyon Radyo, 90.7 Love Radio, 105.1 Easy Rock, DXBM-TV 33 (DZRH News Television)

History
- First air date: 1996
- Former frequencies: 855 kHz (1996–1998)
- Call sign meaning: Radio frequency

Technical information
- Licensing authority: NTC
- Power: 10,000 watts

Links
- Website: dzrhnews.com.ph

DXRF (1260 AM) is a relay station of DZRH, owned and operated by MBC Media Group. The station's relay transmitter is located along MBC Compound, R. Castillo St., Brgy. Governor Vicente Duterte, Agdao, Davao City (sharing transmitter site with Aksyon Radyo).
