= DXET-TV =

Television station in Davao, Philippines

TV5 Davao (DXET-TV)
Relay of DWET-TV
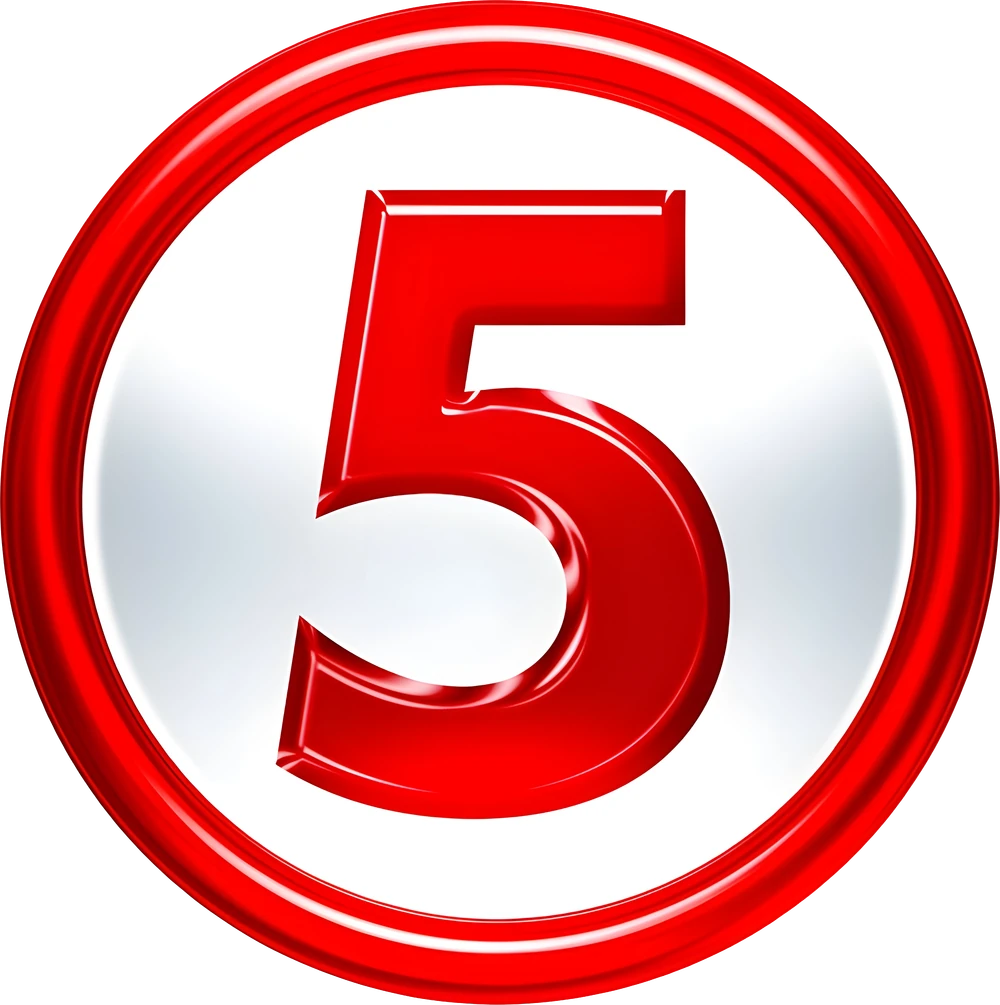
- Metro Davao; Philippines
- City: Davao City
- Channels: Analog: 2 (VHF); Digital: 18 (UHF) (ISDB-Tb) (Test Broadcast); Virtual: 2.01
- Branding: TV5 Davao

Programming
- Subchannels: See list
- Affiliations: 18.01: TV5; 18.02: RPTV; 18.03: One Sports

Ownership
- Owner: TV5 Network, Inc.
- Sister stations: DXWW-TV (RPTV); DXAN-TV (RPTV mirror feed); 106.7 True FM

History
- Founded: August 1988; 38 years ago as DXWW-TV; July 8, 1993; 33 years ago as DXET-TV
- Former call signs: DXWW-TV (1988-1993)
- Former affiliations: RPN (1988-1993)
- Call sign meaning: DX; Edward; Tan (former owner, deceased)

Technical information
- Licensing authority: NTC
- Power: Analog: 50 kW (10 kW on-operational power output); Digital: 10 kW
- ERP: Analog: 232.8 kW
- Transmitter coordinates: 10°22′04.9″N 123°52′00.5″E 10°17′41″N 123°51′10″E

Links
- Website: www.tv5.com.ph

DXET-TV (channel 2) is a television station in Metro Davao, Philippines, serving as the Mindanao flagship of the TV5 network. It is owned and operated by the network's namesake corporate parent; TV5 also provides certain services to RPTV affiliate DXWW-TV (channel 9) and RPTV mirror feed outlet DXAN-TV (channel 29) under an airtime lease agreement with station owners Radio Philippines Network and Nation Broadcasting Corporation, respectively.

The three stations, alongside radio station 106.7 True FM, share master controls and hybrid analog/digital transmitting facilities at the TV5 Heights, Broadcast Ave., Shrine Hills, Brgy. Matina, Davao City.

== History ==
On August 1988, Channel 2 started broadcasting as the Mindanao flagship of Radio Philippines Network after relocating from Channel 4 following ABS-CBN's return to Davao as DXAS-TV.

By early 1993, the Associated Broadcasting Company acquired Channel 2 from RPN which the latter acquired Channel 9 (which ABC planned to acquire the frequency before settling with Channel 2). On July 8, 1993, ABC returned on Davao TV, which changed its callsign DXET-TV using a 5kW Larcan television transmitter (the first of its kind to be installed in Mindanao) with a JAMPRO antenna. Its facilities were described as a "mini-Nova", a miniature version of the parent station's headquarters in Novaliches. By 1994, it had gained positive feedback from local viewers, especially its local newscast. A survey conducted in early 1994 by the Communications Arts classes of Ateneo revealed that two of the network's foreign series, The Raven and Quantum Leap, had entered the top five favorite programs. As of 2000, the station's general manager was Crisanto Sapaula. Plans to improve its transmission tower were underway in 2009, costing P19.5 million, obtained from GMA Network co-owner Felipe Gozon.

On February 26, 2011, it was announced that TV5's facilities in Davao would be upgraded, as part of a network-wide plan to replace its existing transmitter equipment outside of Manila with new ones, as well as obtain more licenses, in order to boost TV5's national reputation. DXET was set to be used as the main operation for Mindanao, whereas several news bureaus under the station's jurisdiction were being built across the region. In early 2012, its share of ratings grew from 15% to 20%. The station started airing Aksyon Dabaw in 2014, but cut all of its local programs in September 2016 as part of cost-cutting measures also involving DYET-TV.

In 2019, after the termination of full-fledged local news programs, its presenter Gem Avancena won a STAR Award. In June and July 2023, installation of new transmitter towers in Mindanao was underway, in order to increase its coverage.

Preceded by DXWW-TV (RPN) (1988–1993)	DXET-TV; 1993–present	Incumbent
