= DXWT =

Radio station in Davao City, Philippines

Wild FM Davao (DXWT)
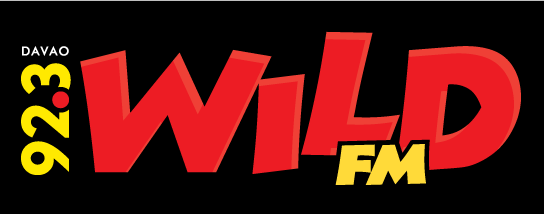
- Logo since 2023
- Davao City; Philippines
- Broadcast area: Metro Davao and surrounding areas
- Frequency: 92.3 MHz (HD Radio)
- RDS: WILD FM
- Branding: 92.3 Wild FM

Programming
- Languages: Cebuano, Filipino, English
- Format: Contemporary MOR, Dance, OPM
- Network: Wild FM

Ownership
- Owner: UM Broadcasting Network
- Sister stations: DXUM, 95.5 Retro Davao

History
- First air date: 1949 (on AM); July 1988 (on FM)
- Former call signs: DXMC (1949–1988)
- Former frequencies: 740 kHz (1949–1978); 819 kHz (1978–1988)
- Call sign meaning: Wild Thing (old slogan); Willie Torres (former manager)

Technical information
- Licensing authority: NTC
- Class: C, D, E
- Power: 10,000 watts

Links
- Webcast: Listen Live via AMFMPH

Wild FM 92.3 former logo

DXWT (92.3 FM), broadcasting as 92.3 Wild FM, is a radio station owned and operated by the UM Broadcasting Network. It serves as the flagship station of the Wild FM network. The station's studio is located at the UMBN Media Center, C. Bangoy cor. Palma Gil St., Davao City, and its transmitter is located along Broadcast Ave., Shrine Hills, Matina, Davao City.

== History ==
=== 1949–1988: DXMC ===
In 1949, businessman Atty. Guillermo Torres founded the first radio station in Mindanao and in Davao City under the callsign DXMC, named after Mindanao Colleges. It was originally broadcast at 740 kilocycles. It then broadcast news and music programming.

In 1957, Torres founded the University of Mindanao Broadcasting Network after its congressional franchise was amended. The station was shut down during martial law, but resumed its operations alongside DXUM, but not DXMM.

In November 1978, due to the switch of the Philippine AM dial from the NARBA-mandated 10 kHz spacing to the 9 kHz rule implemented by the Geneva Frequency Plan of 1975, the station's frequency was transferred to 819 kHz.

=== 1988–present: DXWT ===
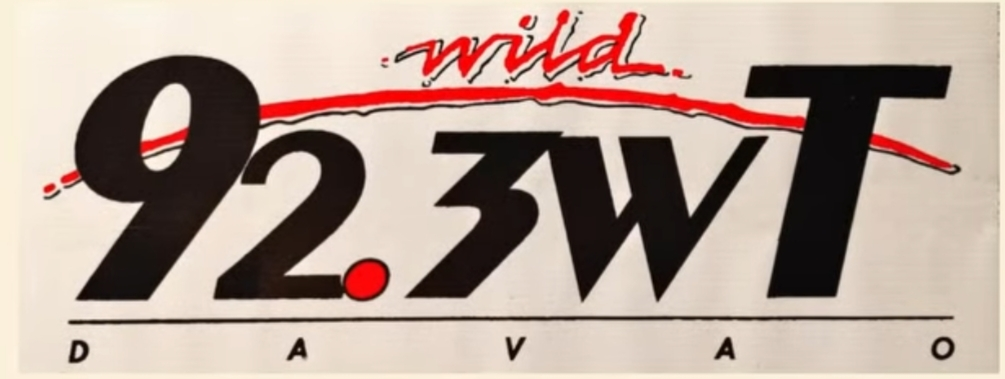
Second logo of DXWT

In July 1988, DXMC migrated into the FM frequency under the callsign DXWT, on which the callsign is based on "Wild Thing" (Tone Lōc song), and became known as Wild 92.3 WT. The Wild brand would be launched in UMBN's stations a few years later.

Under the leadership of Willie Torres, DXWT was formatted as dance-leaning Contemporary Hit Radio (CHR), capitalizing on dance remixes and EPs (extended plays), normally played only in disco clubs. Wild FM transformed radio programming by putting these re-mixes and EPs in 20-minute un-interrupted non-stop sweeps over the airwaves. Wild FM also revolutionized radio promotions and events by organizing street discos and disco sa barangays. In less than a year, Wild FM became no. 1 in Davao City, and a by-word in the industry.

During the early 2000s, it slowly shifted to the masa market. In 2009, the station changed its branding to Wild 92.3 WT. In 2010, it became the first radio station in Mindanao to broadcast via HD Radio technology. Today, Wild FM remains a vital force in the industry, enjoying the steady support of both the listeners and advertisers, as Mindanao's dance outlet.

In July 2018, as part of their 30th anniversary, the station reverted to its Wild FM brand.
