= DXMF-AM =

Radio station in Davao City, Philippines

Bombo Radyo Davao (DXMF)
- Davao City; Philippines
- Broadcast area: Davao Region and surrounding areas
- Frequency: 576 kHz
- Branding: DXMF Bombo Radyo

Programming
- Languages: Cebuano, Filipino
- Format: News, Public Affairs, Talk, Drama
- Network: Bombo Radyo

Ownership
- Owner: Bombo Radyo Philippines; (People's Broadcasting Service, Inc.)
- Sister stations: 96.3 Star FM

History
- First air date: 1975
- Former frequencies: 580 kHz (1975–1978)
- Call sign meaning: Marcelino Florete

Technical information
- Licensing authority: NTC
- Power: 10,000 watts
- Transmitter coordinates: 07°05′08″N 125°35′08″E

Links
- Webcast: Listen Live
- Website: Bombo Radyo Davao

DXMF (576 AM) Bombo Radyo is a radio station owned and operated by Bombo Radyo Philippines through its licensee People's Broadcasting Service, Inc. Its studio and offices are located at Bombo Radyo Broadcast Center, San Pedro St., Davao City; its transmitter is located at Brgy. Ma-a, Davao City.
