= Mindanao Media Hub =

Government broadcast facility in Davao City, Philippines

- Interactive map of the Mindanao Media Hub area

General information
- Status: Completed
- Location: Davao City, Philippines
- Coordinates: 7°03′51″N 125°33′25″E
- Current tenants: Presidential Communications Office
- Groundbreaking: May 3, 2018
- Opened: December 15, 2020

The Mindanao Media Hub is state-owned broadcast facility in Davao City, Philippines.

== Construction ==
The construction of the Mindanao Media Hub began with the groundbreaking ceremony held on May 3, 2018. It was intended to host the Philippine government's media agencies and was initially projected to be finished by January 2019. The facility's construction was part of President Rodrigo Duterte's efforts to decentralize the operations of the national government, including state media.

By August 2018, the media hub was already 40 percent complete. The facility was inaugurated on December 15, 2020. It was built at a cost of ₱700 million. Another inauguration was held on March 18, 2021, to mark the full operations of the Mindanao Media Hub.

== Tenants ==
The Mindanao Media Hub is used by the Presidential Communications Office, as well as other attached organizations such as the People's Television Network, Radyo Pilipinas, the Philippine News Agency and the Philippine Information Agency.
