= DZBS =

Radio station in Baguio, Philippines

Radyo Ronda Baguio (DZBS)
- Baguio; Philippines
- Broadcast area: Benguet, La Union and surrounding areas
- Frequency: 1368 kHz
- Branding: RPN DZBS Radyo Ronda

Programming
- Languages: Ilocano, Filipino, English
- Format: News, Public Affairs, Talk
- Network: Radyo Ronda

Ownership
- Owner: Radio Philippines Network
- Sister stations: DZBS-TV (RPTV)

History
- First air date: 1961
- Former frequencies: 1340 kHz (1961–1978)
- Call sign meaning: Baguio Station

Technical information
- Licensing authority: NTC
- Power: 1,000 watts
- ERP: 2,500 watts

Links
- Website: http://rpnradio.com/dzbs-baguio/

DZBS (1368 AM) Radyo Ronda is a radio station owned and operated by the Radio Philippines Network. The station's studios are located at A205 Lopez Building, Session Road, Baguio, while its transmitter is located at Sitio Lamut, Barangay Beckel, La Trinidad, Benguet.
