= DXFX =

Radio station in Davao City, Philippines

Star FM Davao (DXFX)
- Davao City; Philippines
- Broadcast area: Metro Davao and surrounding areas
- Frequency: 96.3 MHz
- RDS: 1. It's All; 2. For You
- Branding: 96.3 Star FM

Programming
- Languages: English, Cebuano, Filipino
- Format: Contemporary MOR, OPM, News
- Network: Star FM

Ownership
- Owner: Bombo Radyo Philippines; (People's Broadcasting Service, Inc.)
- Sister stations: DXMF Bombo Radyo

History
- First air date: 1993

Technical information
- Licensing authority: NTC
- Power: 10,000 watts
- ERP: 21,000 watts

Links
- Webcast: Listen Live
- Website: Star FM Davao

DXFX (96.3 FM), broadcasting as 96.3 Star FM, is a radio station owned and operated by Bombo Radyo Philippines through its licensee People's Broadcasting Service, Inc. Its studio, offices and transmitter are located at Bombo Radyo Broadcast Center, San Pedro St., Davao City.
