= DXCM-AM =

Radio station in Kidapawan, Philippines

DXCM
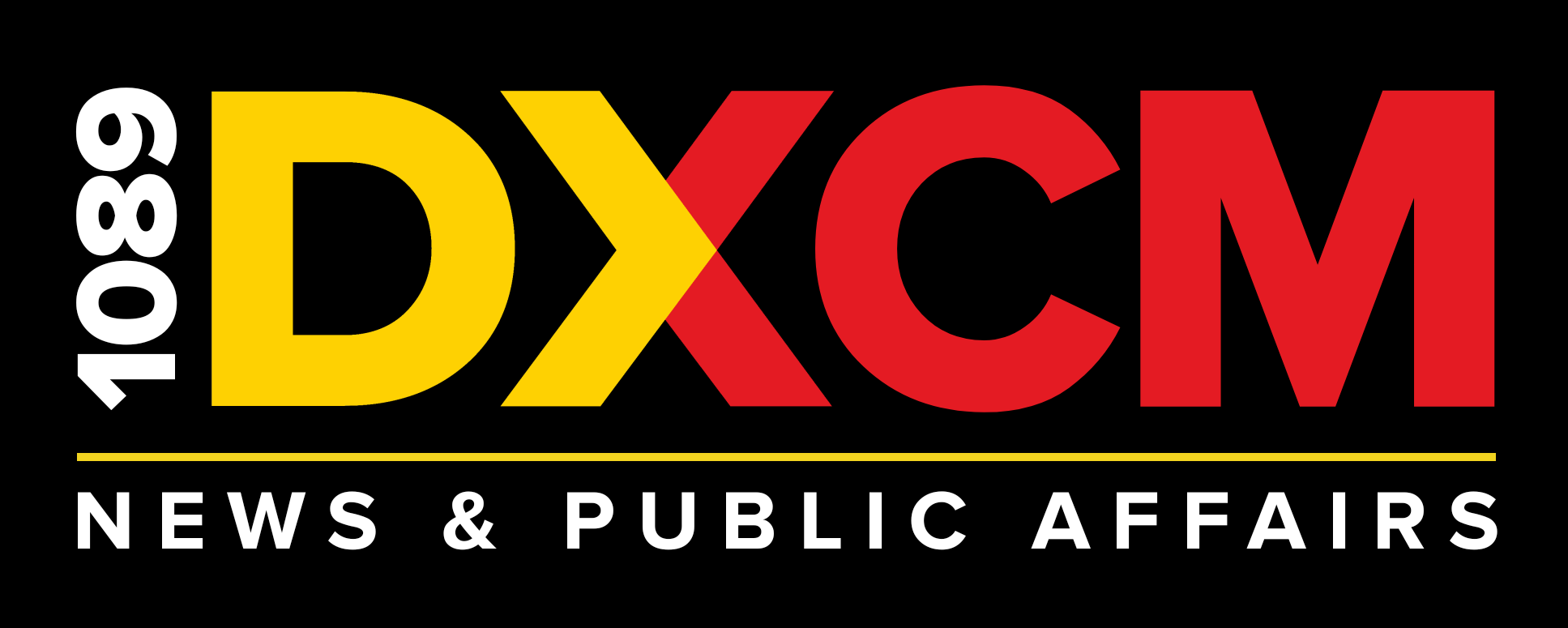
- Kidapawan; Philippines
- Broadcast area: Eastern Cotabato and surrounding areas
- Frequency: 1089 kHz
- Branding: 1089 DXCM

Programming
- Languages: Cebuano, Filipino
- Format: News, Public Affairs, Talk
- Network: UMBN News & Public Affairs

Ownership
- Owner: UM Broadcasting Network

History
- First air date: 1970 (in Cotabato); 2016 (in Kidapawan)
- Call sign meaning: Cotabato Maguindanao

Technical information
- Licensing authority: NTC
- Power: 10,000 watts
- Repeater: DXAZ 92.9 MHz

DXCM (1089 AM) is a radio station owned and operated by UM Broadcasting Network. The station’s studio is located at Ela Bldg., Quezon Blvd., Kidapawan, while the transmitter is located in Brgy. Manongol, Kidapawan.

It was originally broadcasting from Cotabato City until 2016, when it transferred to Kidapawan. By that time, it also established its FM relay station. From 2000 to June 14, 2020, the Radyo Ukay branding was used. On June 15, 2020, management decided to retire the branding as it has run its course. DXCM, along with its other AM stations, started carrying their perspective call letters in their brandings. The yellow highlighted in the "X" of their logos means to move forward.
