= DXMA =

Hope Radio Davao (DXMA)
- Davao City; Philippines
- Broadcast area: Metro Davao and surrounding areas
- Frequency: 104.3 MHz
- Branding: Hope Radio

Programming
- Languages: English, Cebuano, Filipino
- Format: Religious Radio (Seventh-day Adventist Church)
- Network: Hope Radio

Ownership
- Owner: Adventist Media; (Digital Broadcasting Corporation)

History
- First air date: 1995
- Former names: Magik FM (1995-2005); The Edge Radio (2005-2015)

Technical information
- Licensing authority: NTC
- Power: 10,000 watts
- Repeater: Matanao: DXHD 107.1 MHz

Links
- Website: adventistmedia.ph/home/hope-radio

DXMA (104.3 FM), broadcasting as Hope Radio 104.3, is a radio station owned and operated by Adventist Media, the media arm of the Seventh-day Adventist Church. The station's studio is located at #5 Palm Dr., Brgy. Buhangin Proper (Bajada), Davao City and its transmitter is located at Shrine Hills, Matina, Davao City.

The station was formerly owned by Century Broadcasting Network and was one of its few stations under The Edge Radio network of the United Christian Broadcasters from its inception in 2005 until December 31, 2015. The following year, the station was acquired by Adventist Media and became part of the Hope Radio network.
