= DXGN =

Radio station in Davao City, Philippines

Spirit FM Davao (DXGN)
- Davao City; Philippines
- Broadcast area: Metro Davao and surrounding areas
- Frequency: 89.9 MHz
- RDS: SpiritFM
- Branding: 89.9 Spirit FM

Programming
- Languages: Cebuano, Filipino, English
- Format: Religious Radio
- Affiliations: Catholic Media Network

Ownership
- Owner: Davao Verbum Dei Media Foundation, Inc.

History
- First air date: 1988 (Original); June 12, 2016 (Relaunch)
- Call sign meaning: Good News

Technical information
- Licensing authority: NTC
- Power: 10,000 watts

Links
- Website: Official Website

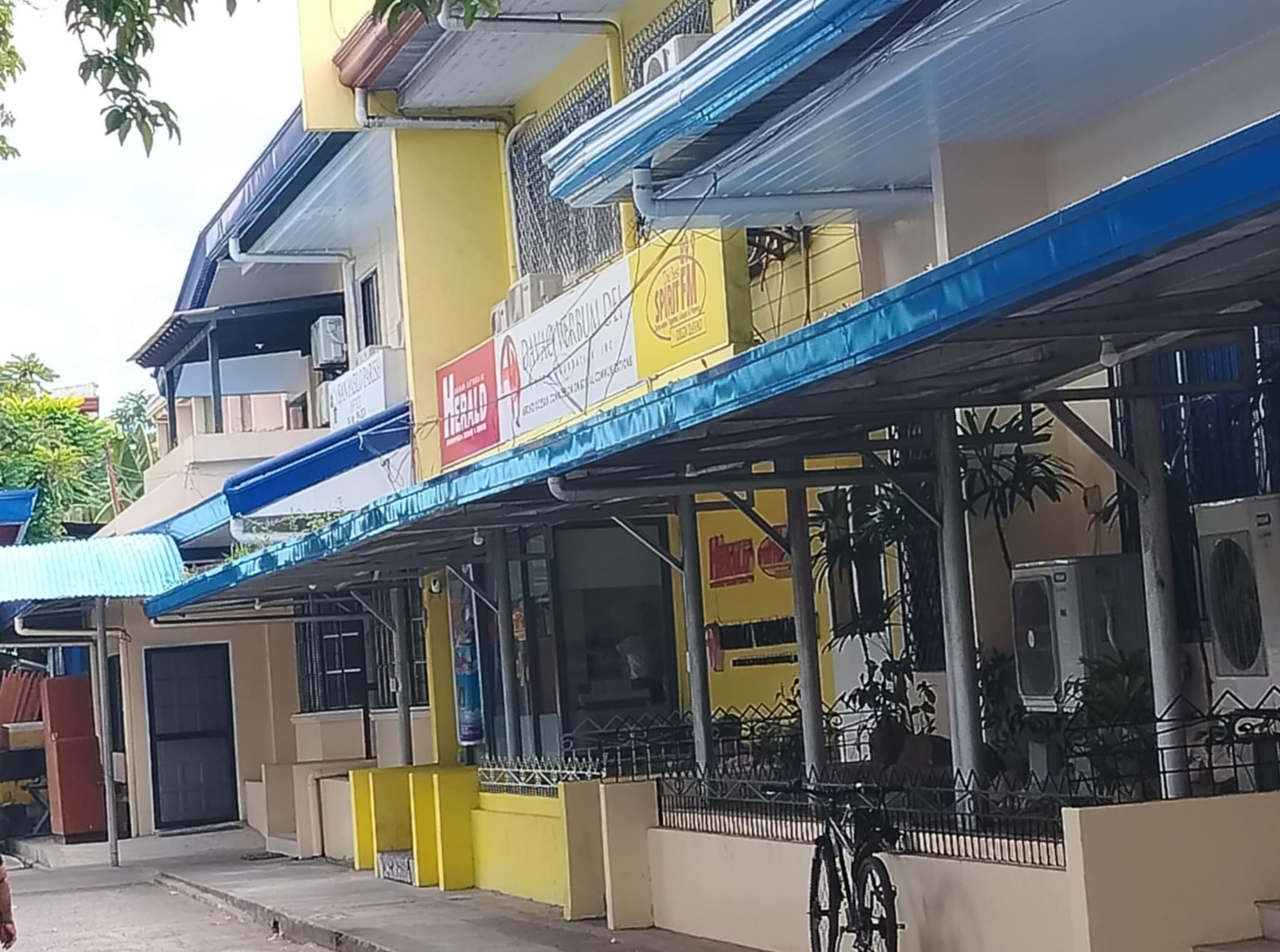
Headquarters of Davao Verbum Dei Media Foundation Inc. at St. Paul Parish Compound in Matina.

DXGN (89.9 FM), broadcasting as 89.9 Spirit FM, is a radio station owned and operated by the Davao Verbum Dei Media Foundation, the media arm of the Roman Catholic Archdiocese of Davao. Its studios are located at the San Pablo Parish Church Compound, Juna Subdivision, Matina, Davao City, and its transmitter is located at Shrine Hills, Matina, Davao City.

== History ==
The station returned to the airwaves on June 12, 2016, after 8 years of hiatus. On April 23, 2025, it officially commenced its 24/7 operations.
