= DXYS =

Radio station in Davao City, Philippines

Easy Rock Davao (DXYS)
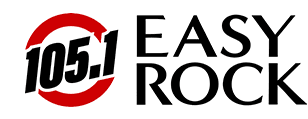
- Davao City; Philippines
- Broadcast area: Metro Davao and surrounding areas
- Frequency: 105.1 MHz (FM Stereo)
- Branding: 105.1 Easy Rock

Programming
- Language: English
- Format: Soft adult contemporary
- Network: Easy Rock

Ownership
- Owner: MBC Media Group; (Cebu Broadcasting Company)
- Sister stations: DXGO Aksyon Radyo, DZRH Davao, 90.7 Love Radio, DXBM-TV 33 (DZRH News Television)

History
- First air date: 1995
- Former call signs: DXTO (1995–1999); DXST (1999–2005)
- Former names: Showbiz Tsismis (1995–1999); Yes FM (1999–2009)
- Call sign meaning: Yes FM (former branding)

Technical information
- Licensing authority: NTC
- Power: 10,000 watts
- ERP: 42,000 watts

Links
- Webcast: Listen Live
- Website: Easy Rock Davao

DXYS (105.1 FM), broadcasting as 105.1 Easy Rock, is a radio station owned and operated by MBC Media Group through its licensee Cebu Broadcasting Company. The station's studio is located at the Ground Floor, ATU Plaza Commercial Mall, Governor Duterte St., Davao City, and its transmitter is located along Broadcast Ave., Shrine Hills, Matina, Davao City.

== History ==
105.1 Easy Rock logo (July 1, 2009-November 14, 2021)

The station was inaugurated in 1995 as a relay station of Manila-based Showbiz Tsismis. In 1999, it rebranded as Yes FM and adopted a mass-based format. On July 1, 2009, the station rebranded as 105.1 Easy Rock and switched to a Soft AC format.
