= DXDJ =

Radio station in Davao City, Philippines

RJFM Davao (DXDJ)
Simulcast of DZRJ-FM Manila
- Davao City; Philippines
- Broadcast area: Metro Davao and surrounding areas
- Frequency: 100.3 MHz
- Branding: 100.3 RJFM

Programming
- Language: English
- Format: Adult Hits
- Affiliations: BBC World Service; Voice of America

Ownership
- Owner: Rajah Broadcasting Network; (Free Air Broadcasting Network, Inc.)

History
- First air date: 1987
- Former names: RJFM (1987–1996); Boss Radio (1996–1999); The Hive (1999–2003); Oldies Radio (2003–2008); Hit Radio (2008–2009)
- Call sign meaning: Don Fernando Jacinto, Ramon Jacinto's father

Technical information
- Licensing authority: NTC
- Power: 20,000 watts
- ERP: 25,000 watts

DXDJ (100.3 FM) is a relay station of RJFM Manila, owned and operated by Rajah Broadcasting Network through its licensee Free Air Broadcasting Network, Inc. The station's relay transmitter is located at Broadcast Avenue, Shrine Hills, Matina, Davao City.

== History ==
The station was established by Rajah Broadcasting Network in 1987 as RJFM. At that time, it aired an album rock format. In 1996, it changed its name to Boss Radio. In the middle of 2003, UMBN took over the station's operations and rebranded the station as 100.3 Oldies Radio with an oldies format, ranging from the 50s, 60s & some 70s. In 2008, it rebranded as Hit Radio and adjusted its music timeline, removing the 50s and adding more 70s & 80s to its playlist. In February 2009, as UMBN's blocktime agreement with the station expired, it became a relay station of Manila-based DZRJ-FM, known as RJFM. Meanwhile, UMBN transferred its operations to ACWS-UBN's DXKR-FM, which became 95.5 Hit Radio (now Retro 95.5).
