= DXBM =

Radio station in Davao City, Philippines

Love Radio Davao (DXBM)
- Davao City; Philippines
- Broadcast area: Metro Davao and surrounding areas
- Frequency: 90.7 MHz
- Branding: 90.7 Love Radio

Programming
- Languages: Cebuano, Filipino
- Format: Contemporary MOR, OPM
- Network: Love Radio

Ownership
- Owner: MBC Media Group
- Sister stations: 105.1 Easy Rock, DXGO Aksyon Radyo, DZRH Davao, DXBM-TV 33 Davao (DZRH News Television)

History
- First air date: February 14, 1987
- Call sign meaning: Inverted as Manila Broadcasting Company

Technical information
- Licensing authority: NTC
- Power: 10,000 watts
- ERP: 20,000 watts

Links
- Webcast: Listen Live
- Website: Love Radio Davao

DXBM (90.7 FM), broadcasting as 90.7 Love Radio, is a radio station owned and operated by MBC Media Group. The station's studio is located inside the MBC Compound, R. Castillo Ave., Brgy. Gov. Vicente Duterte, Agdao, Davao City, and its transmitter is located along Broadcast Ave., Shrine Hills, Matina, Davao City.
