= DXUM =

Radio station in Davao City, Philippines

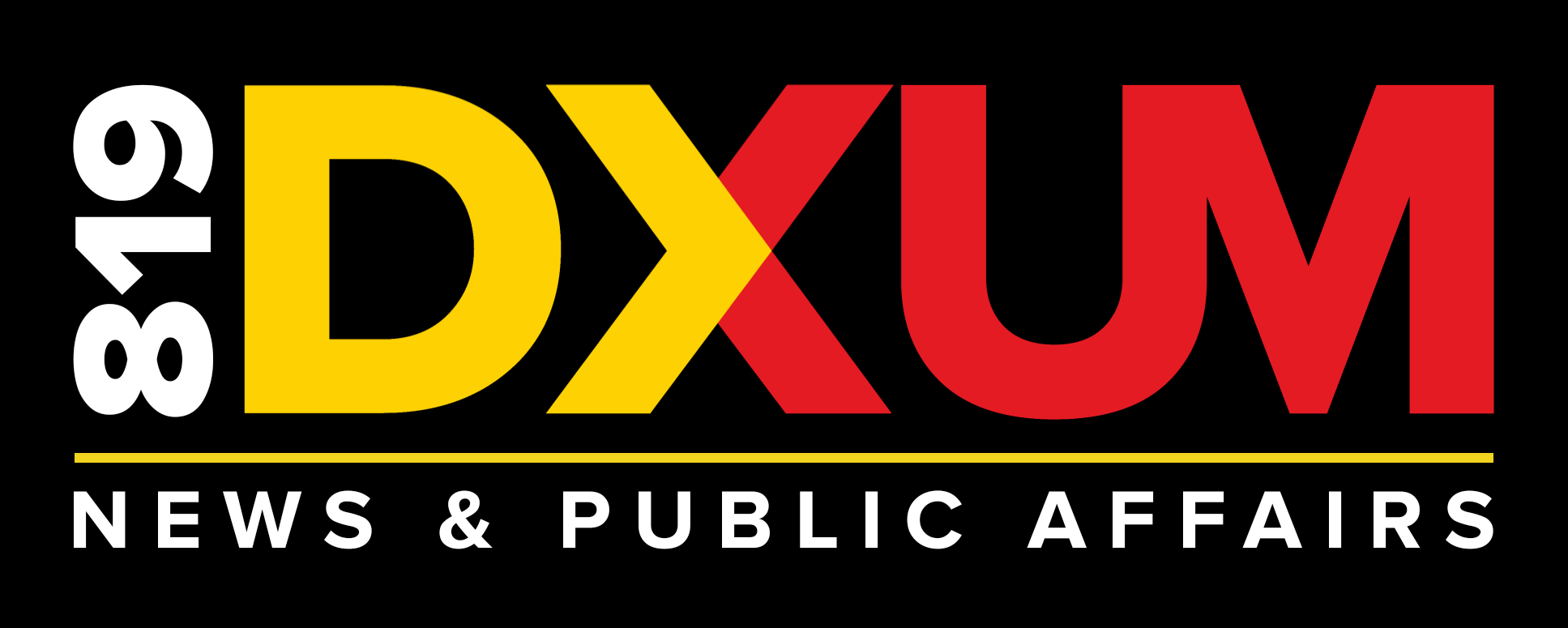
- Davao City; Philippines
- Broadcast area: Davao Region and surrounding areas
- Frequency: 819 kHz
- Branding: 819 DXUM

Programming
- Languages: Cebuano, Filipino
- Format: News, Public Affairs, Talk
- Network: UMBN News & Public Affairs

Ownership
- Owner: UM Broadcasting Network; (Mt. Apo Broadcasting System)
- Sister stations: 92.3 Wild FM, 95.5 Retro Davao

History
- First air date: 1957
- Former frequencies: 810 kHz (1957–1978); 936 kHz (1978–1988)
- Call sign meaning: University of Mindanao

Technical information
- Licensing authority: NTC
- Power: 10,000 watts

DXUM (819 AM) is a radio station owned and operated by UM Broadcasting Network through its licensee, Mt. Apo Broadcasting System. It serves as the flagship station of UMBN's News & Public Affairs network, formerly known as Radyo Ukay. The station's studio is located at the UMBN Media Center, C. Bangoy St. cor. Palma Gil St., Davao City, while the transmitter is located near the University of Mindanao Matina Campus, Davao City.

== History ==
DXUM was launched in 1957, 8 years after Atty. Guillermo Torres launched DXMC and the same year UMBN was founded. While DXMC broadcasts news and variety programming, DXUM airs music programming.

During the Martial Law era (and due to a new law that a broadcast company does not allow more than one station in the same market), the ownership and licensee of DXUM was transferred to Mt. Apo Broadcasting System of the Mt. Apo Science Foundation (MASFI), another institution also owned by Torres and is a sister association to the UM.

In November 1978, due to the switch of the Philippine AM dial from the NARBA-mandated 10 kHz spacing to the 9 kHz rule implemented by the Geneva Frequency Plan of 1975, the station's frequency was transferred to 936 kHz.

During the 1970s and the 1980s, DXUM was the top music station in Davao City.

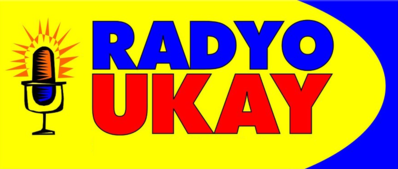
Logo of Radyo Ukay from 2000 to 2020.

In 1988, two years after EDSA People Power Revolution, the disc jockeys of DXUM were transferred to DXMC, which would eventually be migrated on the FM band and became known as Wild FM. Following the changes in the landscape of AM radio now dominated by rival stations, DXUM transferred to its present frequency (819 kHz), while its former frequency now revived as DXDN in Tagum and reformatted as a news/talk station under the brand Radyo Magasin. After a few years, it rebranded as Radyo Peryodiko, and then Radyo Balita until settling with the Radyo Ukay branding in 2000. Radyo means radio and Ukay means to dig. It aims to dig issues and reports and it is known to many as "Investigative" radio.

On June 15, 2020, management decided to retire the branding as it has run its course. DXUM, along with its other AM stations, started carrying their perspective call letters in their brandings. The yellow highlighted in the "X" of their logos means to move forward.
