= DXKT-AM =

Radio station in Davao City, Philippines

Radyo Ronda Davao (DXKT)
- Davao City; Philippines
- Broadcast area: Davao Region and surrounding areas
- Frequency: 1071 kHz
- Branding: RPN DXKT Radyo Ronda

Programming
- Languages: Cebuano, Filipino
- Format: News, Public Affairs, Talk, Drama
- Network: Radyo Ronda

Ownership
- Owner: Radio Philippines Network
- Sister stations: DXWW-TV (RPTV)

History
- First air date: 1961
- Former frequencies: 1060 kHz (1961–1978)

Technical information
- Licensing authority: NTC
- Power: 10,000 watts

Links
- Webcast: https://tunein.rpnradio.com/davao
- Website: https://rpnradio.com/dxkt-davao

DXKT (1071 AM) Radyo Ronda is a radio station owned and operated by the Radio Philippines Network. The station's studio and offices are located at Door 3, Second Floor, GRI Business Center, Kilometer 14, Barangay Panacan, and its transmitter is located at Bunaply Purok 4, Kilometer 24, Barangay Bunawan, Davao City. It operates daily from 4:00 AM to 6:00 PM.
