= Republika Ni Juan Davao =

Radio station in Davao City, Philippines

Republika Davao
- Davao City; Philippines
- Broadcast area: Metro Davao and surrounding areas
- Frequency: 87.9 MHz
- Branding: 87.9 Republika

Programming
- Language: English
- Format: Top 40 (CHR), OPM
- Network: Republika

Ownership
- Owner: Presidential Broadcast Service
- Sister stations: DXRP Radyo Pilipinas

History
- First air date: August 1, 2018
- Former names: FM1 (2018–2024)
- Former frequencies: 87.5 MHz (August 2018 - January 2020)

Technical information
- Power: 10,000 watts

Links
- Webcast: Listen Live
- Website: pbs.gov.ph/stations

87.9 Republika (87.9 FM) is a radio station owned and operated by the Presidential Broadcast Service. It's studios are located at the Mindanao Media Hub Bldg., Carlos P. Garcia Highway, Bangkal, Davao City, and its transmitter is located at Shrine Hills, Matina, Davao City.

== History ==
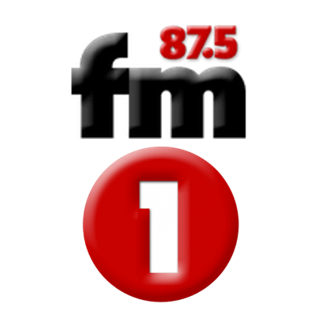
FM1 logo from 2017 to 2020

87.5 MHz was used as a temporary frequency of Radyo Pilipinas Davao from February to August 2018, while conducting maintenance and transferring studios to the Mindanao Media Hub, to be located in Davao City.

FM1 Davao, the first regional FM station of PBS and FM1 Manila, was launched on August 1, 2018. It is being led by station manager Hariett Saniel (Joe Fisher); Maurice Abella, marketing manager and former Mix FM and Oomph Radio station manager, Joey Sy-Domingo.

In January 2020, however, the station went off-air for a month. FM1 resumed broadcasting at 87.9 MHz on February 3, 2020, the same date the City Government of Davao took over its former frequency.

On December 5, 2020, The studios of Republika FM1 Davao along with its sister station Radyo Pilipinas Davao transferred to the new home at the new Mindanao Media Hub in Bangkal, Davao City.

Under the new PBS director general since September 2024, the FM1 branding was dropped. On January 2, 2025, the station reformatted into adult-leaning Top 40 format after a month.

On February 1, 2025, the station switched to a mass-based format. On February 14, it was relaunched as Republika ni Juan.

In September 2026, it brought back the Republika branding and the Top 40 format as a separate filler.
