= UM Broadcasting Network =

Philippine radio network

University of Mindanao Broadcasting Network (UMBN)
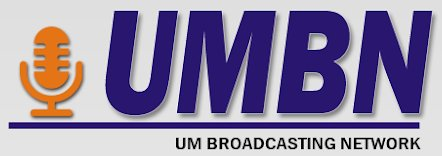

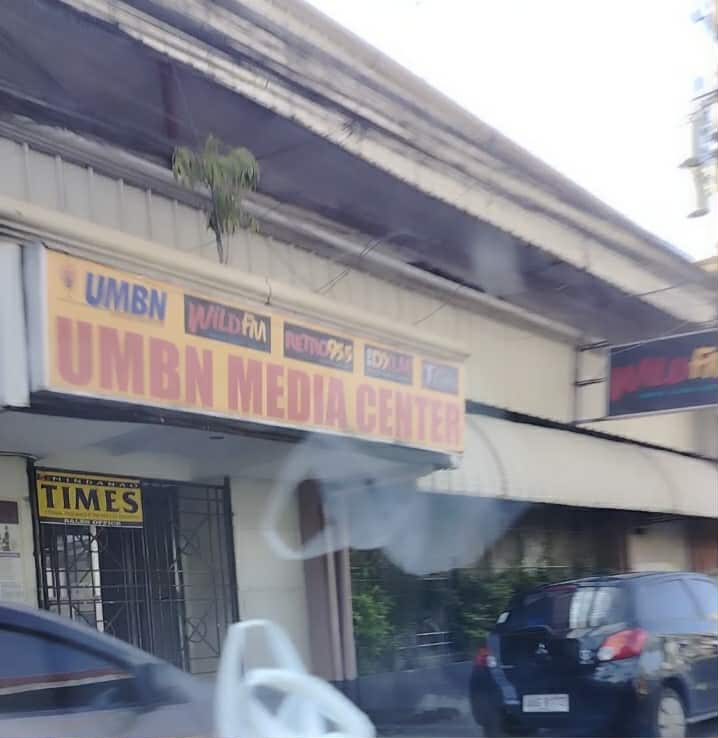
- UMBN Headquarters at University of Mindanao in C. Bangoy St., Davao City, Philippines
- Type: Private
- Industry: Radio broadcasting
- Founded: 1949 in Davao City
- Founder: Atty. Guillermo E. Torres
- Headquarters: Davao City, Philippines
- Key people: Guillermo P. Torres, Jr. (President and CEO)
- Brands: Radyo Ukay, Retro, Wild FM
- Services: Airtime lease management
- Parent: University of Mindanao
- Website: umbn.ph

The University of Mindanao Broadcasting Network (UMBN) is a Philippine radio network majority-owned and controlled by the Torres family. It serves as the media arm of the University of Mindanao. Its headquarters are located at the UMBN Media Center, C. Bangoy St. cor. Palma Gil St., Poblacion, Davao City, while its national marketing offices are located in Makati. It has three radio network brands, namely UMBN News & Public Affairs, Wild FM and Retro.

== History ==
The origins of UMBN can be traced to DXMC, the first radio station in Davao City and the entire Mindanao region. DXMC was founded in 1949 by businessman Atty. Guillermo E. Torres, and was granted a broadcast franchise by the Congress under Republic Act 514.

The broadcast franchise was later amended on June 22, 1957, under Republic Act 1832, allowing Torres to establish and operate radio stations in the Philippines. With this, the University of Mindanao Broadcasting Network or UMBN was established on the same year the MC was renamed as the University of Mindanao. DXUM was also launched as its second radio station in Davao.

From 1957 to the 1960s, UMBN established several stations within the Mindanao area such as in the Davao areas (DXMM in Davao City, DXDN in Tagum, and DXDS in Digos), Cotabato City, General Santos, Cagayan de Oro, Zamboanga City, Iligan, and Bukidnon.

In 1972, all UMBN stations were shut down in the midst of the Martial Law, but later resumed its operations lately. In 1975, Torres transferred the ownership of DXUM to Mt. Apo Broadcasting System (also owned by Torres) but maintaining its airtime operations.

In 1988, about two years after the "EDSA People Power Revolution", DXMC was transferred to the FM broadcasting frequency and relaunched as DXWT, forming the nucleus of UMBN's FM network known as Wild FM, while DXUM and other AM stations formed the nucleus of the Radyo Ukay network.

In the 1990s, UMBN expanded its Wild FM network into the Visayas region with launch of 105.9 Wild FM (now Monster BT 105.9) in Cebu in 1994 through airtime lease. This was later transferred to 103.5 FM in 2002 after Ditan Communications became an affiliate of UMBN.

In 2003, UMBN rented the airtime of Rajah Broadcasting Network-owned 100.3 FM and became an oldies/classic hits station known as Oldies Radio, which was rebranded as Hit Radio in 2008. In 2009, it transferred its airtime lease to ACWS-UBN-owned 95.5 FM, which would be acquired by UMBN in 2016 through its licensee Mt. Apo Broadcasting. By that time, the station became Hit Radio later becoming Retro 95.5 while on the other hand, the former became a relay of Manila-based DZRJ-FM since early 2010s.

On June 16, 2020, its AM stations retired the Radyo Ukay branding after 20 years, as part of enhancement of the stations' news and public affairs programming.

== Radio networks ==
=== AM Stations ===
Branding	Callsign	Frequency	Location
DXUM	DXUM (Note: Licensed under Mt. Apo Broadcasting System.)	819 kHz	Davao City
DXMV	DXMV	1134 kHz	Valencia
DXDN	DXDN	936 kHz	Tagum
DXDN	DXAV	92.5 MHz	Tagum
Radyo ni Ga	DXDS	1161 kHz	Digos
Radyo ni Ga	DXAY	92.7 MHz	Digos
DXCM	DXCM	1089 kHz	Kidapawan
DXCM	DXAZ	92.9 MHz	Kidapawan

=== Wild FM ===
Branding	Callsign	Frequency	Location
Wild FM Davao	DXWT	92.3 MHz	Davao City
Wild FM General Santos	DXRT	99.1 MHz	General Santos
Wild FM Cagayan de Oro	DXWZ	94.3 MHz	Cagayan de Oro
Wild FM Iligan	DXIL	103.1 MHz	Iligan
Wild FM Valencia	DXWB	92.9 MHz	Valencia
Wild FM Butuan	DXBB	98.5 MHz	Butuan
Wild FM Iloilo	DYWT (Note: Licensed under Ditan Communications.)	105.9 MHz	Iloilo City

=== Retro ===
Branding	Callsign	Frequency	Location
Retro Davao	DXKR	95.5 MHz	Davao City
Retro Cebu	DYCD	103.5 MHz	Cebu City

=== Former stations ===
Callsign	Frequency	Location	Note/s
DXMM	810 kHz	Davao City	Closed during Martial Law.
DXRZ	900 kHz	Zamboanga City	Sold to Radio Mindanao Network in 1992.
DXKZ	91.5 MHz	Zamboanga City	Sold to RT Broadcast Specialists.
DXRC	1440 kHz	Malaybalay	Equipment donated to the Armed Forces of the Philippines in 1973 and transferred to Zamboanga City as DXSC.
