= DXGO-AM =

Radio station in Davao City, Philippines

Aksyon Radyo Davao (DXGO)
- Davao City; Philippines
- Broadcast area: Davao Region and surrounding areas
- Frequency: 855 kHz
- Branding: DXGO Aksyon Radyo

Programming
- Languages: Cebuano, Filipino
- Format: News, Public Affairs, Talk
- Network: Aksyon Radyo

Ownership
- Owner: MBC Media Group; (Pacific Broadcasting System)
- Sister stations: DZRH Davao, 90.7 Love Radio, 105.1 Easy Rock, DXBM-TV 33 (DZRH News Television)

History
- First air date: March 16, 1998

Technical information
- Licensing authority: NTC
- Power: 10,000 watts
- ERP: 20,000 watts

DXGO (855 AM) Aksyon Radyo is a radio station owned and operated by MBC Media Group through its licensee Pacific Broadcasting System. The station's studio, offices and transmitter is located inside the MBC Compound, R. Castillo St., Brgy. Governor Vicente Duterte, Agdao, Davao City.
