= DZKI =

Radyo Ronda Iriga (DZKI)
- Iriga; Philippines
- Broadcast area: Camarines Sur, Albay
- Frequency: 1332 kHz
- Branding: RPN DZKI Radyo Ronda

Programming
- Languages: Rinconada, Filipino
- Format: News, Public Affairs, Talk
- Network: Radyo Ronda

Ownership
- Owner: Radio Philippines Network

History
- First air date: October 28, 1968
- Former frequencies: 1280 kHz (1968–1978)
- Call sign meaning: Kanlaon Iriga

Technical information
- Licensing authority: NTC
- Power: 1,000 watts

DZKI (1332 AM) Radyo Ronda is a radio station owned and operated by the Radio Philippines Network. The station's studio is located at the RPN Regional Broadcast Center, Bonacua Bldg., Iriga-Baao Rd., Brgy. San Nicolas, Iriga, and its transmitter is located in Brgy. San Roque, Iriga.
