= DXKR-FM =

Radio station in Davao City, Philippines

Retro Davao (DXKR)
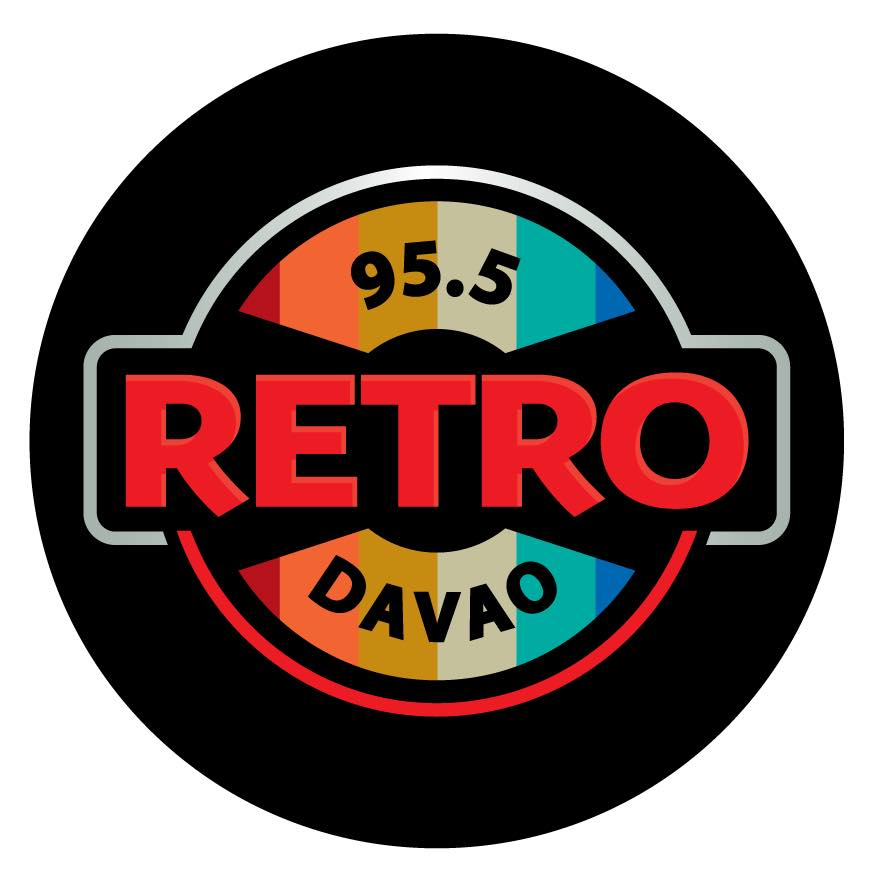
- Davao City; Philippines
- Broadcast area: Metro Davao and surrounding areas
- Frequency: 95.5 MHz
- RDS: 1. RETRO; 2. 95.5 FM
- Branding: 95.5 Retro Davao

Programming
- Language: English
- Format: Classic Hits, OPM

Ownership
- Owner: UM Broadcasting Network; (Mt. Apo Broadcasting System)
- Sister stations: DXUM, 92.3 Wild FM

History
- First air date: 1993
- Former call signs: As Hit Radio: DXDJ (2003–2009)
- Former names: WRocK (1993–2009); Hit Radio (2009–2015)
- Former frequencies: As Hit Radio: 100.3 MHz (2003–2009)
- Call sign meaning: Inverted as WRocK (former branding)

Technical information
- Licensing authority: NTC
- Power: 10,000 watts

Links
- Webcast: Listen Live via AMFMPH

DXKR (95.5 FM), broadcasting as 95.5 Retro Davao, is a radio station owned and operated by UM Broadcasting Network through its licensee Mt. Apo Broadcasting System. The station's studio is located at the UMBN Media Center, C. Bangoy St. cor. Palma Gil St., Davao City, and its transmitter is located along Broadcast Ave., Shrine Hills, Matina, Davao City.

== Background ==
=== 1993-2009: WRocK ===
DXKR was established in 1993 as 95.5 WRocK. It was formerly owned by ACWS-United Broadcasting Network. It was formerly located on 149 Elpidio Quirino Ave., on Davao City.

On October 6, 2008, Manila Broadcasting Company purchased WRocK Manila for PhP229.6 million. However, ACWS-UBN and sister company Exodus continued to retain control of the WRocK provincial stations.

=== 2009-present: Hit Radio/Retro ===
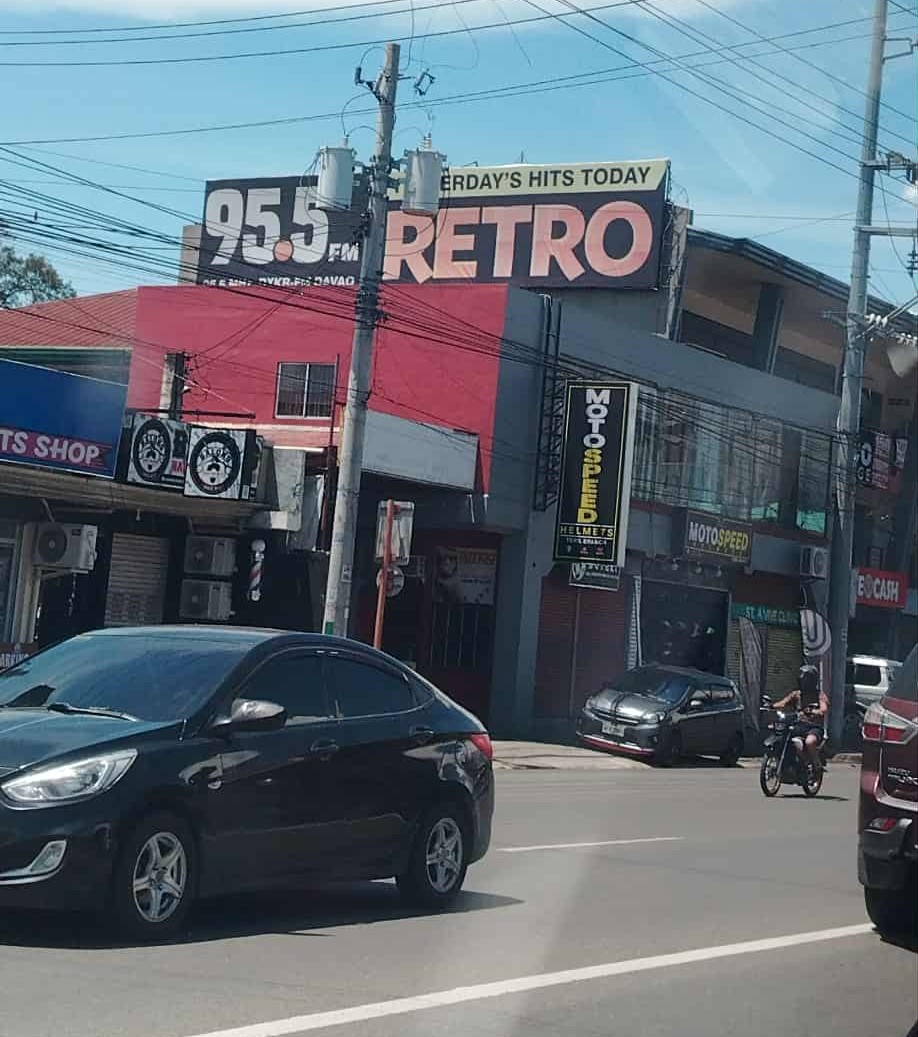
A billboard of Retro 95.5 Davao in Toril, Davao City.

In February 2009, UMBN transferred its airtime lease agreement to 95.5 after its agreement with RBN's 100.3 expired, hence rebranding the station as 95.5 Hit Radio.

On January 1, 2016, Hit Radio rebranded as Retro 95.5 (later on known as Retro Davao years later), named after its sister station in Cebu. At the same time, months after ACWS-UBN was acquired by a new group of investors, UMBN acquired the station. Due to broadcast ownership guidelines, its frequency license was assigned to UMBN's sister company Mt. Apo Broadcasting System.
