= Davao City Disaster Radio DXDP 87.5FM =

Radio Station in Davao City, Philippines

Davao City Disaster Radio (DXDP)
- Davao City; Philippines
- Broadcast area: Metro Davao and surrounding areas
- Frequency: 87.5 MHz
- Branding: 87.5 Davao City Disaster Radio

Programming
- Languages: Cebuano, Filipino
- Format: Community radio
- Affiliations: Presidential Broadcast Service

Ownership
- Owner: City Government of Davao

History
- First air date: February 3, 2020
- Call sign meaning: DXDP

Technical information
- Licensing authority: NTC
- Power: 10,000 watts

DXDP (87.5 FM), broadcasting as 87.5 Davao City Disaster Radio, is a radio station owned and operated by the City Government of Davao. Its studios are located at City Hall Annex Building, Magallanes, Davao City, and its transmitter is located at Brgy. Langub, Ma-a, Davao City.

The frequency was occupied by FM1 Davao until January 2020.

== History ==
In February 2020, the City Government launched an emergency-centric community station under the identity of "Davao City Disaster Radio". Prior to the launch, the city government announced its intention to establish a community station with a purpose of disseminating vital information on disasters and emergency preparedness.

The station was officially launched on February 3, 2020 with a guest presence from Davao City Mayor Sara Duterte. At that time, it was located in RJ Homes Bldg.

On the second quarter of 2021, the station transferred to the City Hall Annex Building.

On April 6, 2026 until further notice, due to the impact of the increase in oil prices which has affected the operational costs, the station reduced its daily operations from round-the-clock to temporary broadcast hours from 5:00 am to 12:00 midnight.
