= DYKB-AM =

Radio station in Bacolod, Philippines

Radyo Ronda Bacolod (DYKB)
- Bacolod; Philippines
- Broadcast area: Northern Negros Occidental and surrounding areas
- Frequency: 1404 kHz
- Branding: RPN DYKB Radyo Ronda

Programming
- Languages: Hiligaynon, Filipino
- Format: News, Public Affairs, Talk
- Network: Radyo Ronda

Ownership
- Owner: Radio Philippines Network

History
- First air date: 1970
- Former frequencies: 1420 kHz (1970–1978)
- Call sign meaning: Kanlaon Bacolod

Technical information
- Licensing authority: NTC
- Power: 5 kW

Links
- Webcast: tunein.rpnradio.com/bacolod.html
- Website: rpnradio.com/dykb-bacolod/

DYKB (1404 AM) Radyo Ronda is a radio station owned and operated by the Radio Philippines Network. Its studios and transmitter are located at Purok KBS, Brgy. Sum-ag, Bacolod.
