= DXET-FM =

True FM Davao (DXET)
- Davao City; Philippines
- Broadcast area: Metro Davao and surrounding areas
- Frequency: 106.7 MHz
- RDS: 1. 106.7 MHz; 2. True FM; 3. Davao FM; 4. 106.7 FM; 5. NBCDavao
- Branding: 106.7 True FM

Programming
- Languages: Cebuano, Filipino
- Format: News, Public Affairs, Talk
- Network: True FM
- Affiliations: One PH; True TV; KAMM Media Network (for weekday morning block)

Ownership
- Owner: Interactive Broadcast Media
- Operator: TV5 Network, Inc.
- Sister stations: Through TV5: DXET-TV (TV5); DXWW-TV (RPTV); DXAN-TV (RPTV Mirror feed)

History
- First air date: July 8, 1993
- Former call signs: True FM: DXFM (2011–2024)
- Former names: Kool 106 (1993–2004); Radyo Digoseño (2022–2024); Dream FM (2004–2011)
- Former frequencies: True FM: 101.9 MHz (2011–2024)
- Call sign meaning: Edward Tan (former owner, deceased)

Technical information
- Licensing authority: NTC
- Class: A, B, C, D, E
- Power: 10,000 watts
- ERP: 32,000 watts

Links
- Website: news.tv5.com.ph

DXET (106.7 FM), on-air as 106.7 True FM, is a radio station owned by Interactive Broadcast Media and operated by TV5 Network, Inc. The station's studio and transmitter are located at the TV5 Heights, Broadcast Avenue, Shrine Hills, Matina, Davao City.

== History ==
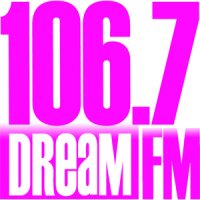
106.7 Dream FM

Launched on July 8, 1993, by TV5's predecessor ABC Development Corporation, 106.7 FM began as Kool 106, featuring a hot adult contemporary format that shifted to mainstream Top 40 by 1995. In September 2004, it rebranded as Dream FM, adopting a smooth jazz format.

Following MediaQuest Holdings, Inc.'s acquisition of TV5 in March 2010, Dream FM and its regional stations were spun off into Dream FM Network, led by Anton Lagdameo. Ownership transferred to Interactive Broadcast Media, and all Dream FM stations ceased operations on June 30, 2011.

In February 2022, the Digos City government took over the station, launching it as Radyo Digoseño with operations based in Digos. Radyo Digoseño concluded its broadcast on this frequency on October 31, 2024, though it continues to stream on Facebook.

On November 1, 2024, the station's operations returned to Davao City, simulcasting 101.9 FM as part of its transition to the True Network. True FM permanently moved to 106.7 FM on November 4, rebranding it as 106.7 True FM, aligning with its Mega Manila counterpart. This transition was a result of Philippine Collective Media Corporation's airtime lease and content agreement with Nation Broadcasting Corporation, part of a larger asset sale.
