= DXFE-AM =

Radio station in Davao City, Philippines

DXFE
- Davao City; Philippines
- Broadcast area: Davao Region and surrounding areas
- Frequency: 1197 kHz
- Branding: 1197 DXFE

Programming
- Languages: Filipino, Cebuano, English, Hokkien (Chinese programming)
- Format: News, Public Affairs, Talk, Religious Radio

Ownership
- Owner: Far East Broadcasting Company

History
- First air date: 1972
- Call sign meaning: Far East

Technical information
- Licensing authority: NTC
- Power: 10,000 watts

Links
- Website: dxfe.febc.ph

DXFE (1197 AM) is a non-commercial radio station owned and operated by the Far East Broadcasting Company. The station's studio is located along Circumferential Rd., Doña Vicenta Village, Davao City, and the transmitter is located along Duha corner San Rafael Rd., Brgy. 10-A, Davao City.
