= Company town =

Town where stores and housing are owned by one company that is the main employer

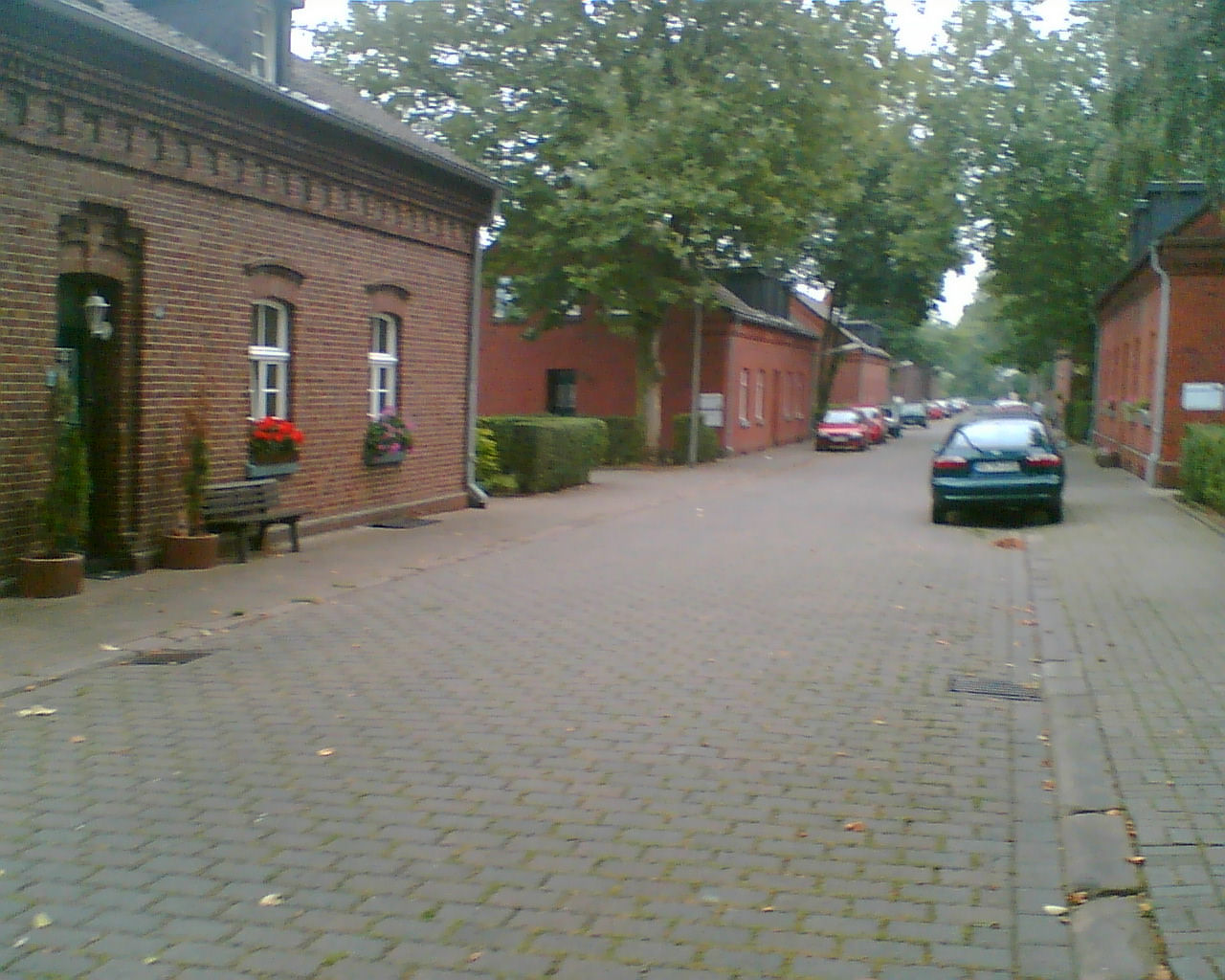
The town of Siedlung Eisenheim in Oberhausen, Germany

A company town is a place where all or most of the stores and housing in the town are owned by the same company that is also the main employer. Company towns are often planned with a suite of amenities such as stores, houses of worship, schools, markets, and recreation facilities.

Some company towns were established to improve living conditions for workers, but many have been regarded as controlling and/or exploitative. Others were not planned, such as Summit Hill, Pennsylvania, United States, one of the oldest, which began as a Lehigh Coal & Navigation Company mining camp and mine site nine miles (14 km) from the nearest outside road.

== Paternalism ==
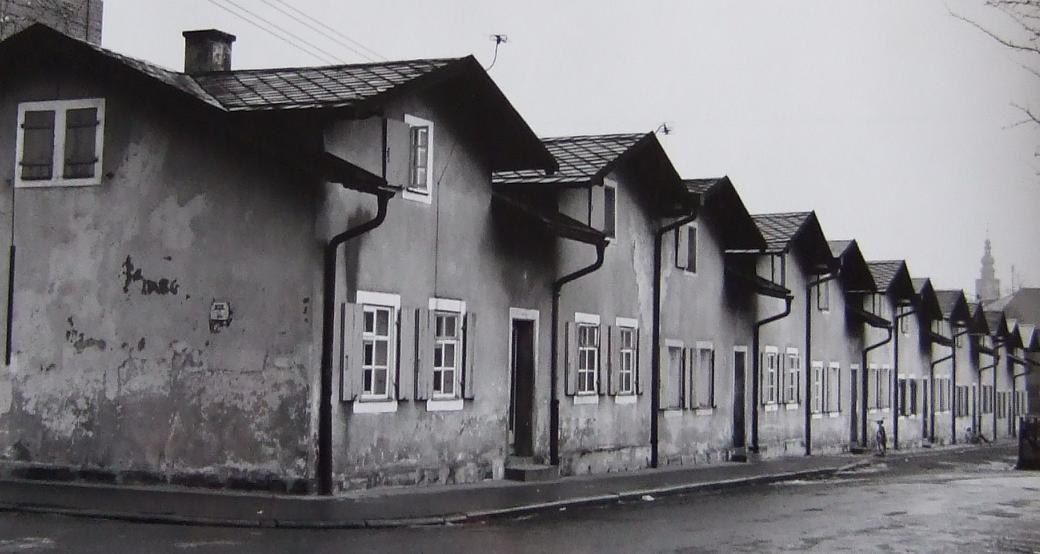
Company town Burg in Bayreuth, Germany

Paternalism, a subtle form of social engineering, refers to the control of workers by their employers who seek to force middle-class ideals upon their working-class employees. Many nineteenth-century business people considered paternalism as a moral responsibility, or often a religious obligation, which would advance society while furthering their business interests. Accordingly, the company town offered a unique opportunity to achieve such ends.

Although many prominent examples of company towns portray their founders as "capitalists with a conscience" (for example, George Cadbury's Bournville), if viewed cynically, the company town was often an economically viable ploy to attract and retain workers. Additionally, for-profit shops within company towns were usually owned by the company, which was unavoidable to its isolated workers, thus resulting in a monopoly for the owners.

Although economically successful, company towns sometimes failed politically due to lacking elected officials and municipally owned services. Accordingly, workers often had no say in local affairs, and therefore felt dictated to. Ultimately, this political climate caused resentment amongst workers and resulted in many residents losing long-term affection for their towns. Such was the case at the company town of Pullman, Chicago in the 1890s.

== History of American company towns ==
=== Pullman lesson ===
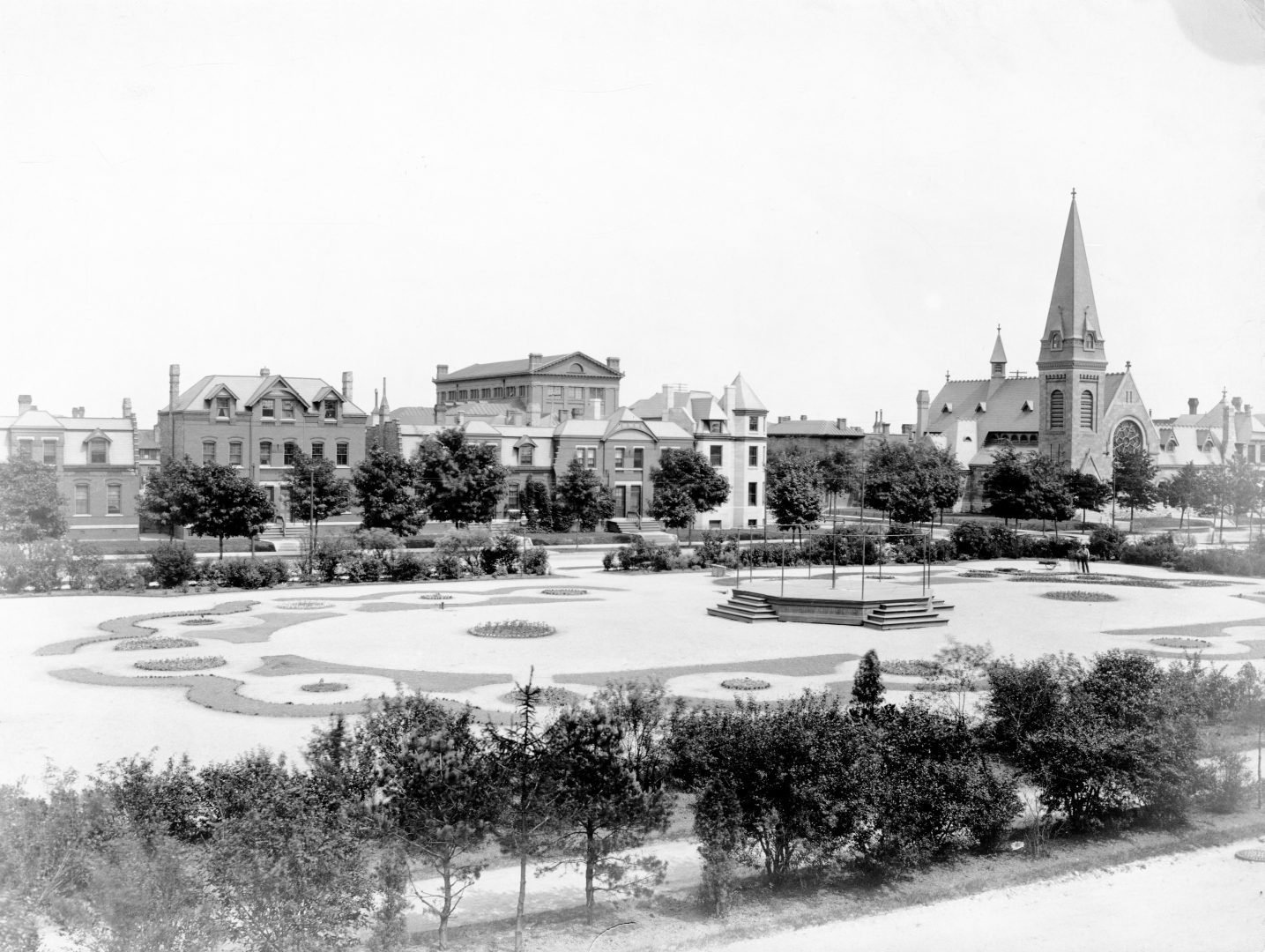
Pullman in the late 19th century

Although many small company towns existed in mining areas of Pennsylvania before the American Civil War, one of the most significant and most substantial early company towns in the United States was Pullman, developed in the 1880s just outside the Chicago city limits. The entirely company-owned town provided housing, markets, a library, churches, and entertainment for the 6,000 company employees and an equal number of dependents. Employees were not required to live in Pullman, although workers tended to get better treatment if they chose to live there.

The town operated successfully until the economic panic of 1893 when demand for the company's products declined, and Pullman lowered employee wages and hours to offset the decrease in demand. Despite this, the company refused to lower rents in the town or the price of goods at its shops, thus resulting in the Pullman Strike of 1894. A national commission formed to investigate the causes of the strikes found that Pullman's paternalism was partly to blame and labeled it "Un-American". The report condemned Pullman for refusing to negotiate and for the economic hardships he created for workers in the town of Pullman. "The aesthetic features are admired by visitors, but have little money value to employees, especially when they lack bread." The State of Illinois filed suit, and in 1898, the Supreme Court of Illinois forced the Pullman Company to divest ownership in the town, which was annexed to Chicago.

However, government observers maintained that Pullman's principles accurately provided his employees with a quality of life otherwise unattainable. Still, they recognized that his excessive paternalism was inappropriate for a large-scale corporate economy and thus caused the town's downfall. Accordingly, government observers and social reformers alike saw the need for a balance between control and well-designed towns, concluding that a model company town would only succeed if independent professionals, acting as a buffer between employers and employees, took a role in conception, planning, and management of these towns.

Historian Linda Carlson argues that the managers of corporate towns in the early 20th century believed they could avoid the mistakes made by George Pullman in the 1880s. She says they:

wanted to create a better life for their employees: decent housing, good schools, and a "morally uplifting" society. In return, they expected stable, hard-working employees who would eschew the evils of drink and, most importantly, not fall prey to the blandishments of union organizers.

Thus, the Pullman Strike did not kill the company town concept but rather initiated a new chapter in their existence. Over the next thirty years, the old model of paternalism was abandoned in favour of new professionally designed company towns with architects, landscape architects, and planners translating "new concepts of industrial relations and social welfare into new physical forms". This suited capitalists of the day who were keen to avoid the experiences of Pullman. The first real example occurred at Indian Hill-North Village, Massachusetts, in 1915.

=== Decline of American company towns ===
As access to surrounding municipalities increased, residents of company towns gained access to an increasing amount of government-funded public resources such as schools, libraries, and parks. Accordingly, there was no longer a need for the amenities of company towns which, before welfare capitalism, had previously been unattainable to the working class.

This was well received by some employers as the idea of 'laissez-faire' individualism, which promoted entrepreneurial virtues of hard work being rewarded rather than direct charity, began to shape new-age paternalism.

The Roosevelt administration's New Deal dealt the final blow to end American company towns by raising minimum wages, encouraging industrial self-governance, and pushing for the owners of company towns to "consider the question of plans for eventual employee ownership of homes".

== Model company towns ==
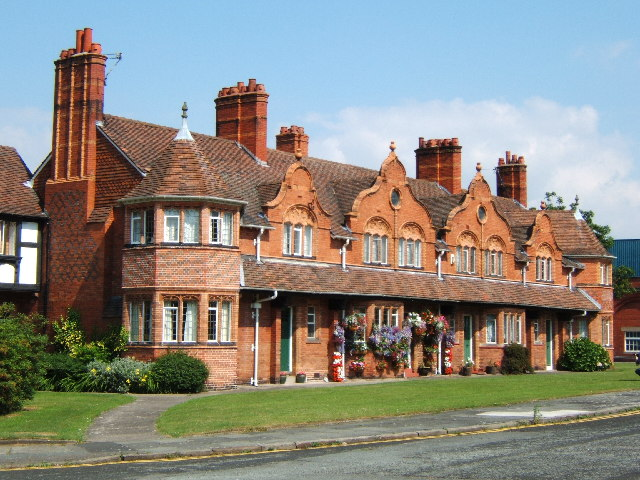
An example of houses at Port Sunlight, England

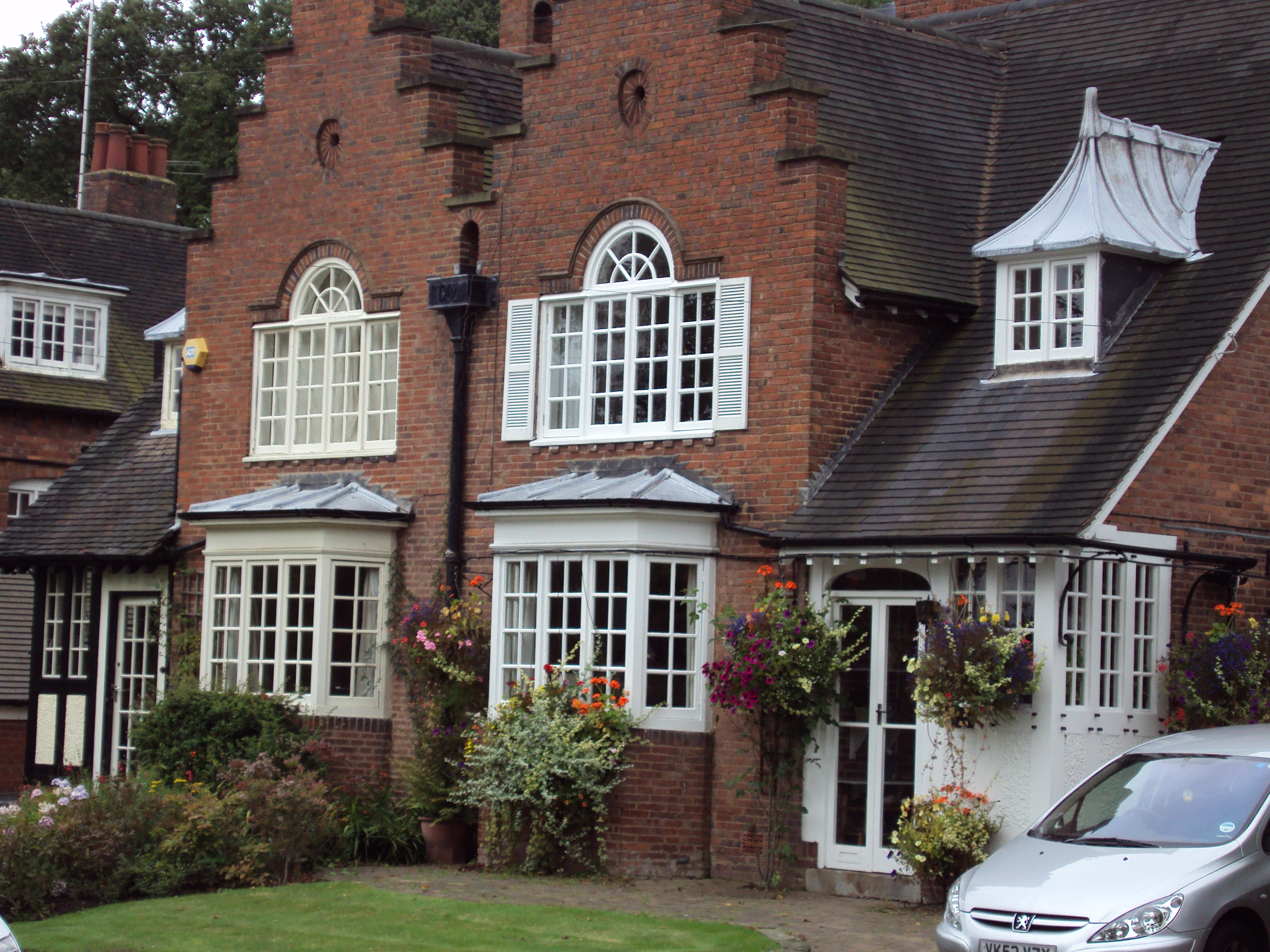
Houses in Bournville, England

During the late nineteenth century, model company towns materialized as enlightened industrialists recognized that many poor workers were living in appalling conditions. These industrialists wished to combat the unsanitary and congested conditions common to working-class districts to create better living conditions for workers. Model company towns such as Port Sunlight (1888) and Bournville (1895) were influential in regards to their building and planning innovation. The ideas generated from these model towns are regarded as having a significant influence on the Garden City movement.

The model company town is concerned with creating a productive and prosperous company. Enlightened industrialists believed this could be achieved by providing a healthier residential environment for their employees. Planning a model company town involved the fusion of new notions of house design and layout. The paternalism of the enlightened industrialist was exhibited in his desire to provide an environment for his employees that was aesthetically appealing and which included well-designed residences, parks, schools, libraries, and meeting halls. The industrialist also wished to contribute to his workers' well-being by providing social programs such as sporting events and functions. This, however, highlights the power and immense control possessed by the company owner, who could shape the lifestyle and activities of his employees to serve his interests and those of the company.

=== Model company towns in Britain ===
Model villages for agricultural workers were founded in the early 19th century in the United Kingdom. The creation of model company towns was particularly evident in Britain during the latter half of the nineteenth century with the creation of Saltaire (1851), Bournville, Port Sunlight, Creswell and New Earswick (1901) and coincided with the housing-reform movement, which emphasized the improvement of housing for the working class. These model towns contrasted with the overcrowded conditions in British working-class districts, which were often characterized by congested housing, unsanitary conditions, and poor provision of open space and facilities. Model company towns promoted the idea of orderly, planned town development as well as the notion of preparing for the needs of the community to provide healthier living conditions.

Model company towns around the mid-nineteenth century, such as Copley (1849), near Halifax, and Saltaire (1853), close to Bradford, had improved dwellings for workers, which contrasted with working-class housing in other industrial villages and cities. These model company towns prompted the creation of others, such as Port Sunlight, Bournville, and Creswell, within an environment of reform.

Port Sunlight (1888) in Cheshire was established by William Hesketh Lever (later Lord Leverhulme) of Lever Brothers – a soap and tallow manufacturer. The earlier layout of this model company town was planned to suit the site's undulating topography. Port Sunlight catered for the Lever Brothers employees with improved housing (cottages of varying designs and materials) and gardens, as well as social and community facilities, including an auditorium, a school, tennis courts, and bowling greens. Port Sunlight combined the use of formal and informal planning elements, such as straight streets close to the town centre and curved streets in the residential areas. This combination of the formal and informal represented a new feature of British town planning.

Bournville (1895), near Birmingham, was established by the Cadbury brothers, George and Richard. George and Richard Cadbury chose to transfer the Cadbury factory to this new site to provide their employees with improved living conditions and a country environment that they could enjoy – a far cry from Birmingham's busy, smoky city centre. The firm provided education as a compulsory academic course, and workers were allowed to complete commercial or technical training. The Cadburys also encouraged their workers to get involved in the social life of Bournville by providing sports facilities, athletic and cultural clubs, and social events such as summer parties. George Cadbury, a Quaker, preached Christian values, such as respectability, thrift, and sobriety, and sought to unify the Bournville community through rituals such as gift-giving between employer and employee. The firm also established work councils, such as the Women's Works Council, and supported trade unions.

Bournville represented the union of industry and nature as the company town featured the attractiveness of the countryside and low-density development with well-built dwellings. Unlike Port Sunlight, Bournville catered for a mixed community, where residences were not restricted to the workforce only. Bournville illustrated how, towards the end of the nineteenth century, low-density development was being punctuated along with the provision of open air, space, and sunlight. Bournville's gardens, parks, tree-lined streets, sense of spaciousness, and country setting demonstrated George Cadbury's endeavour to provide workers with a healthy and well-ventilated environment.

The Bolsover Company developed two exemplary mining communities in Derbyshire during the late nineteenth century: Bolsover (1891) and Creswell (1896). The Bolsover Company aimed to provide improved living conditions for the miners and their families in these model industrial villages. The houses at Creswell were built in concentric circles, and within these circles was a large open parkland and a bandstand. Not only did the Bolsover Company aim to provide better housing, but they also wished to improve workers' moral fibre, believing that the provision of facilities and the promotion of workers' welfare would discourage drunkenness, gambling, and bad language. The Bolsover Company provided facilities deemed beneficial for employees at both villages, including clubhouses, bowling greens, cooperative society stores, cricket pitches, and schools. During the early years of these model industrial villages, the Bolsover Company organized various events intended to enhance community life, such as flower shows, lectures, sporting events, concerts, teas, and dances.

== History by Country ==
=== Mexico ===
During the Porfiriato, American-owned mining towns that settled mostly uninhabited areas included Cananea, El Boleo, Nacozari, Navojoa, Copala, Concordia, Santa Eulalia, Santa Rosalía de Camargo, Batopilas, and Esperanzas. Americans and Mexicans were segregated, with the 1906 Cananea strike precipitating the Mexican Revolution.

=== Namibia ===
During South African Apartheid, a form of company towns existed under the contract labor system in Namibia, then South West Africa, a colony of South Africa. Indigenous workers were coerced into signing yearlong contracts in caged-in factory compounds, which they were not allowed to leave without permission, with movement strictly controlled by Pass laws. In addition they lived in the compound dorms and primarily got food from the compound's cafeteria, both under the control of their employers. As such, alongside the typically bad working conditions, it has been characterized by many as close to slavery.

=== Spain ===
==== Industrial colonies in Catalonia ====
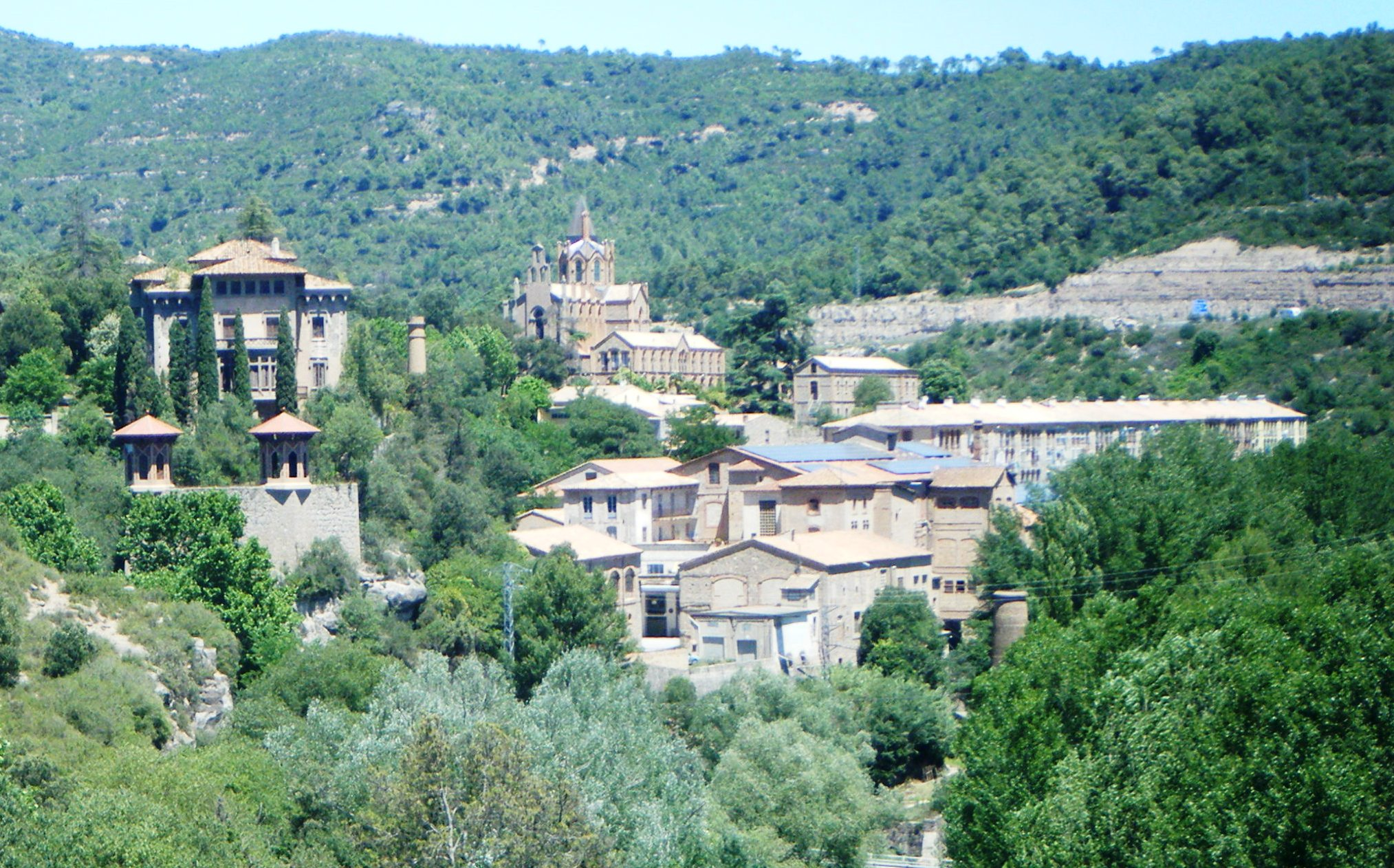
Cal Pons, a textile company town, or industrial colony, in Puig-reig

Catalonia, located in north-eastern Spain, has an especially high density of company towns, known locally as industrial colonies. They are especially concentrated in river basins along the Ter and Llobregat and their tributaries. In Berguedà, for example, within 20 km, there are 14 colonies. The total number in Catalonia is around a hundred. These were small towns created around a factory or mine, built in a rural area, and, therefore, separate from any other population. They typically housed between 100 and 500 inhabitants; in some cases, upwards of 1000 people lived in these towns.

These industrial colonies were an emblematic aspect of industrialization in Catalonia, specifically, the second industrialization, which resulted in certain areas that were once purely rural becoming industrial. They were first created in the second half of the nineteenth century, especially in the 1870s after the American Civil War ended and raw cotton again became readily available. The last colonies were created in the early years of the twentieth century. Thus, company towns in Catalonia have a history going back some 150 years; however, in almost all cases, the company that operated the colony has now shut down. The most common industry in these colonies was textiles, and the most important from the standpoint of architecture, urban design, and the complexity of their operation. More than 75 textile colonies were recorded, although there were also mining, metallurgy, cement, and agricultural colonies.

These colonies (particularly the textile-related ones) were mostly constructed close to a river. This was because they used hydraulic power (waterwheels) to run the factory. One reason for this was that Catalonia was poor in coal, and importing it was expensive. In addition, the Catalan rivers (with little volume but a very steep sloping run) provided free and almost inexhaustible energy, which was lacking only in times of drought.

The industrial colonies' system began to collapse in the 1960s due to their inflexible capital structure and social changes, such as the desire for workers to own appliances, cars, or homes, the declining influence of religion, and the opportunities offered by towns. The colonies gradually emptied of people even before the definitive industrial crisis, which worsened in 1978. In the 1980s and 1990s, almost all the factories in these industrial colonies closed. From that moment on, many colonies became towns that were now independent of the company, others were abandoned and remain without inhabitants. Other factories were leased to smaller industries or now lie empty.

Some of the more interesting colonies include: Colònia Güell, in Santa Coloma de Cervelló, which contains several modernist buildings, such as the crypt church built by Antoni Gaudí; L'Ametlla de Merola, Puig-reig, where centenary traditional cultural activities are held, such as the representation of Els Pastorets; the three colonies of Castellbell i el Vilar: La Bauma, El Borràs, El Burés, with buildings of architectural interest; Cal Rosal, between Berga, Avià and Olvan, which, in 1858, was the first colony in the era of building large colonies in the Llobregat; Cal Vidal, Puig-reig, which houses the Museum of the Vidal Colony, or the Museum of the Sedó Colony, ideal visits for anyone wishing to learn what life was like in one of these industrial experiments.

=== Sweden ===
The mining city of Kiruna in Sweden was originally around 1900, built by the mining company in an unpopulated area. Many buildings, including the church, were built by the company. Many smaller towns were built and even planned by companies. Skoghall in Värmland is such an example where Stora AB owned a papermill and contained a city-planning office.

=== Ukraine ===
The city of Pripyat in Ukraine was established in 1970 solely to house the workers at the adjacent Chernobyl Nuclear Power Plant and their families. It was one of several "nuclear cities" constructed by Soviet nuclear power firms throughout the latter half of the 20th century. All amenities, stores, and employment were conducted through each nuclear city's power plant administration.

=== United States ===
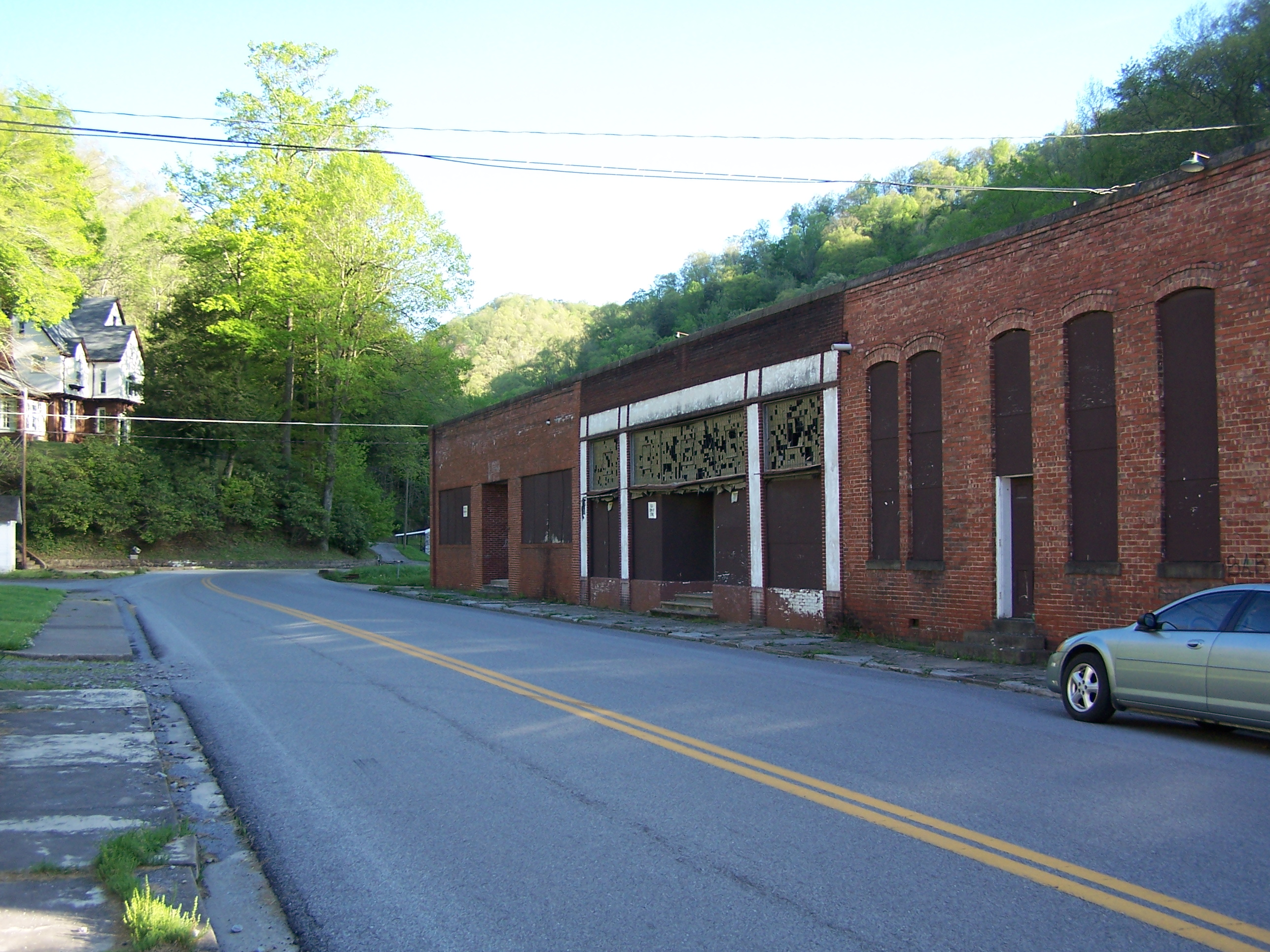
Coalwood, West Virginia is a company town as portrayed in the movie October Sky.

At their peak, there were more than 2,500 company towns, housing 3% of the US population. By the 1920s they were in decline due to factors mentioned above.

The rate of company owned housing however was higher, the Bureau of Labor Statistics surveyed a sample of 213 companies for 1916, a full 34.4% of their workforce lived in company housing. However, the survey covered primarily manufacturing (textile, iron and steel mills) and mining towns.

The companies that ran the towns were mainly labor-intensive companies such as coal, steel, lumber, and various war industries. Most people living in these towns were immigrants new to the country.

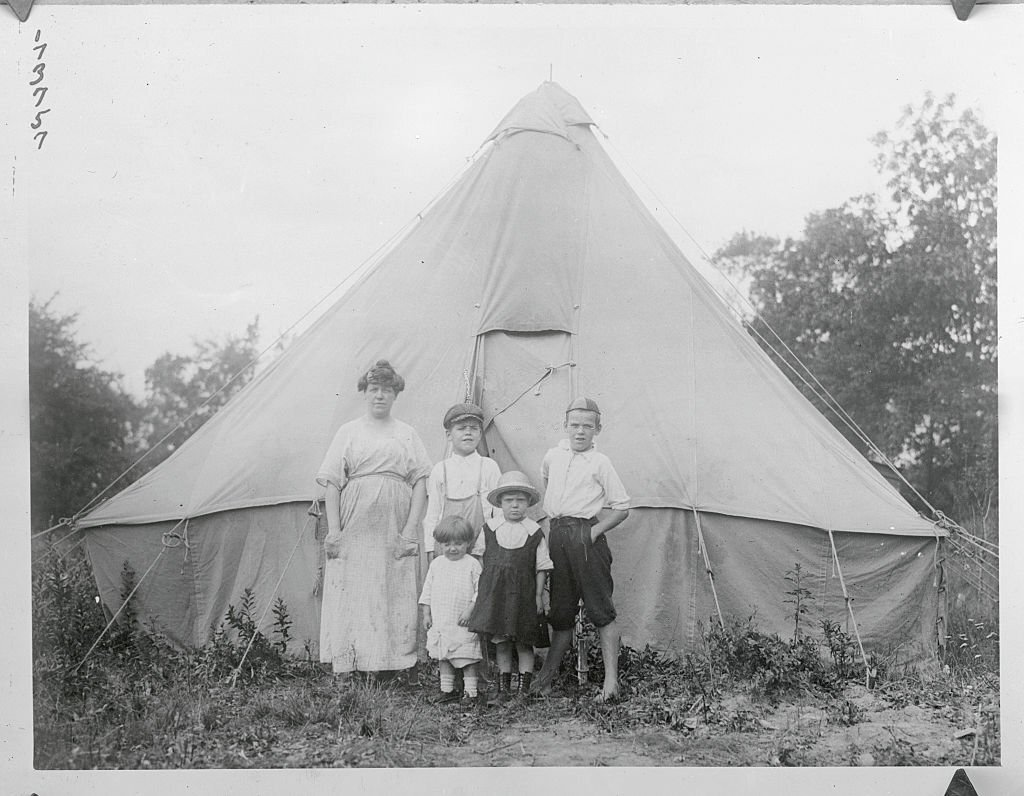
It was not uncommon for families to be evicted from company owned homes during strikes such as this family shown living in a tent after being evicted during the New England Textile Strike in Lonsdale, R.I. - July 15, 1922

Segundo, Colorado, was a company town where the CF&I coal company housed its workers. It offered adequate housing and promoted upward mobility through its sponsorship of a YMCA Center, an elementary school, some small businesses, and a company store. However, air pollution was a constant health threat, and the houses lacked indoor plumbing. As demand for metallurgical coal declined, the mine laid off workers, and Segundo's population declined. After a major fire in 1929, CF&I left town, and Segundo became a ghost town. In 2021, the governor of Nevada, Steve Sisolak, announced a plan to launch so-called "Innovation Zones" in Nevada to attract technology firms. The zones would permit companies with large land areas to form governments with the same authority as counties, including imposing taxes, forming school districts and courts, and providing government services. The measure to further economic development with the "alternative form of local government" has not yet been introduced in the Legislature. Sisolak pitched the concept in his State of the State address on January 19. By allowing tech corporations to establish their governments, the plan is hoped to bring in new businesses at the forefront of "groundbreaking technologies" without the state cutting taxes or paying economic rent that previously helped Nevada attract companies like Tesla Inc.

In March 2021, Elon Musk announced plans to incorporate the Boca Chica area of far southeastern Texas, the site of a SpaceX rocket manufacturing and launch facility, as the city of Starbase. Some have labeled the plans and SpaceX's existing operations in the area as an example of a company town. After voters approved a municipal ballot measure, formal incorporation of the city of Starbase occurred on May 20, 2025. Bobby Peden, a SpaceX vice president, is the first mayor of the city.

== See also ==
- List of company towns
- College town
- Mill town
- Monotown, a similar phenomenon in Russia
- Railway town
- Corporatocracy
- Housing cooperative
- Public housing
- Wage slavery
- History of social housing in France
- Kibbutz
