= Rosas Pandan =

Song by Domingo "Minggoy" Lopez
- Language: Cebuano
- Released: 1938
- Genre: Balitaw
- Songwriter: Domingo Lopez
- Composer: Domingo Lopez

"Rosas Pandan" is a song written and composed by the Filipino musician Domingo "Minggoy" Lopez. The lyrics, which were originally in Cebuano, are about a provincial girl named Rosas Pandan going to the fiesta. Lopez originally made the song for a zarzuela of the same name released in 1938. Popularized by the singer Pilita Corrales in the 1970s, "Rosas Pandan" is now regarded as a folk song among Cebuano people and other Visayans. An arrangement by George Hernandez has been performed by choirs internationally into the 21st century.

== Lyrics and composition ==
"Rosas Pandan" was written and composed by the Filipino musician Domingo "Minggoy" Lopez (1912–1981), whose main instrument was the guitar. (Note: The Lopez family has in its possession four documents proving that Lopez authored "Rosas Pandan": Annex "A", a photocopy of the lyrics of "Rosas Pandan" written in Lopez's notebook, which also contains his other original compositions; Annex "B", the copyright registration of "Rosas Pandan"; Annex "C", the machine copy of the musical score of Rosas Pandan, submitted as part of the copyright registration application; and Annex "D", a photocopy of the contract on royalties for "Rosas Pandan" between Lopez and MARECO, Inc. represented by Mr. Manuel P. Villar, the owner.) Lopez, who was from Cebu City, was an actor in a theatrical troupe led by Pio Kabahar. "Rosas Pandan" was the titular song in a zarzuela released in 1938 with a libretto by Kabahar. Kabahar also wrote the script for a film adaptation directed by Toting Villarino.

"Rosas Pandan" is a song in the style of the balitaw. It is in binary form, with the second section repeated twice to the same lyrics: ABB. It has a syncopated, repeated rhythm. The lyrics, originally written in Cebuano, are about a pretty girl named Rosas Pandan who comes down from the mountains to go to the fiesta and draws everyone's attention. (Note: Since "Rosas Pandan" has become a folk song, some characteristics of the character have become part of popular memory despite not being mentioned in the original lyrics. For example, she did not have a brother named Buko, although a suitor named Dodeng is mentioned in the song.) One of the song's distinctive features are the non-lexical vocables—e.g., tig-a-ding-tig-a-ding-tig-a-ding—which are meant to sound like the accompanying guitar strumming. In George Hernandez's arrangement of "Rosas Pandan", made for an a cappella choir, the lower voices are used to imitate a guitar.

== Legacy ==
=== Recordings ===
In 1973, the Filipino singer Pilita Corrales recorded a Tagalog version translated by Levi Celerio, popularizing the song. The nonsense syllables were excised, leading a journalist from The Freeman to opine that the song's "oomph" and "cadence" had been lost in translation. Corrales later re-released it, performing the original lyrics in honor of her Cebuano heritage. Another singer, Susan Fuentes, also recorded her own rendition of the song. "Rosas Pandan" is now widely known as a Cebuano or Visayan song rather than a Tagalog one. It is considered a Cebuano folk song, Lopez's best-known composition, and one of Fuentes' and Corrales' most famous songs.

=== Choirs ===
In 1995, George Gemora Hernandez, a music director based in San Francisco, was at the Festival Internacional de Cant Coral Catalunya Center, an international choral festival in Puig-reig, Spain, when he was asked for an easy song that could be performed at the close by all the 1,000 singers present. Hernandez proposed "Rosas Pandan". Since then, Hernandez's arrangement has been performed by choirs internationally into the 21st century, even though it is a lesser-known Filipino song internationally. From a cursory search on YouTube, Positively Filipino's Myles A. Garcia counted 19 performances of "Rosas Pandan" by choirs from US, Canada, Colombia, Brazil, Russia, South Korea, and New Zealand.

=== Geography ===
A purok of Banago, a barangay in Bacolod, is named Rosas Pandan.
