= Cal Casas =

- Singular population entity
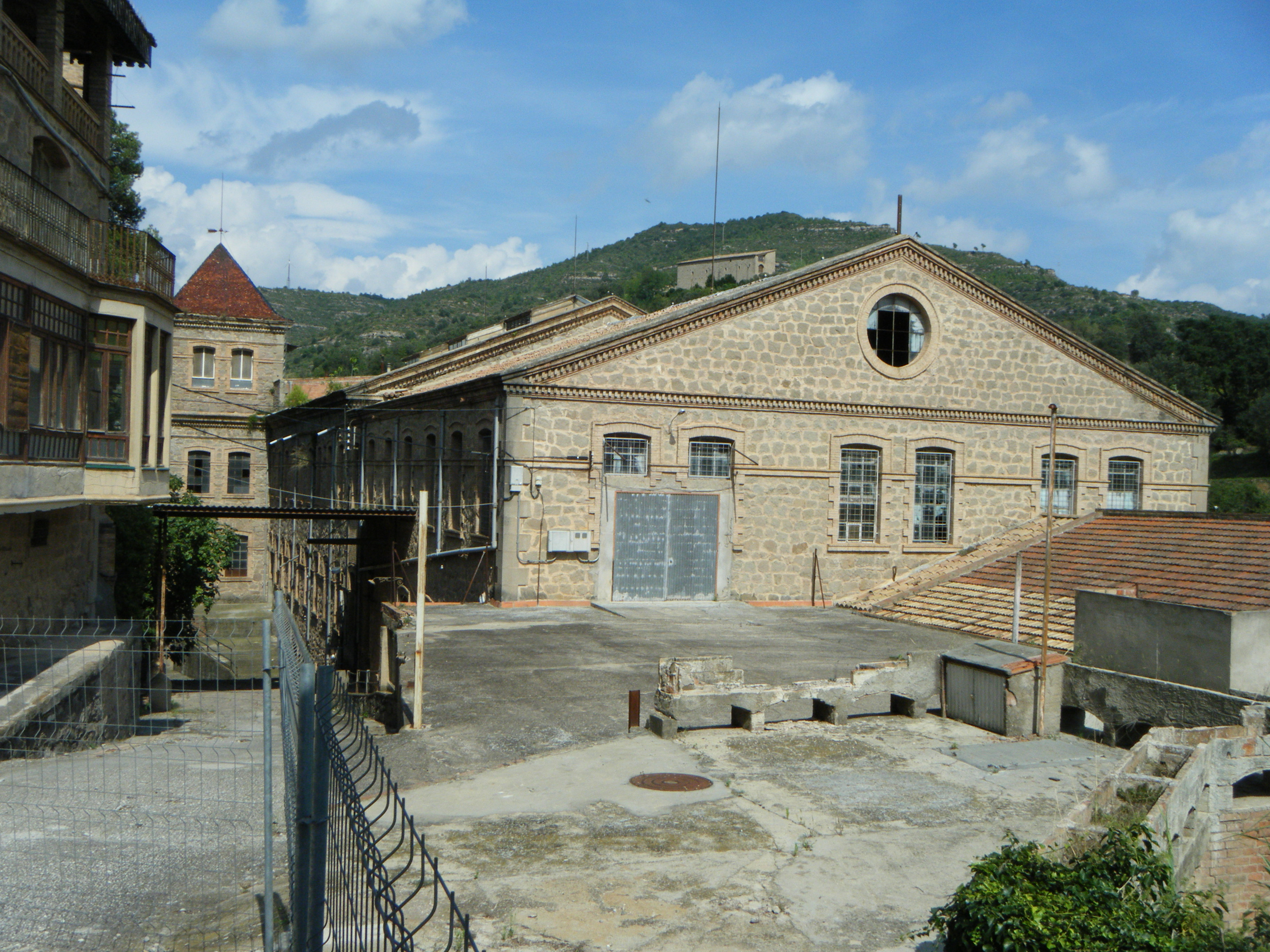
- View of Cal Casas

- Location within Spain Location within Catalonia Location within Province of Barcelona
- Coordinates: 41°58′36.6″N 1°52′48.7″E
- Country: Spain
- A. community: Catalunya
- Province: Barcelona
- Municipality: Puig-reig

Population (January 1, 2024)
  - Total: –
- Time zone: UTC+01:00
- Postal code: 08692
- MCN: 08175
- Website: Official website

Cal Casas is a singular population entity in the municipality of Puig-reig, in Catalonia, Spain.
