= Cal Pons =

- Singular population entity
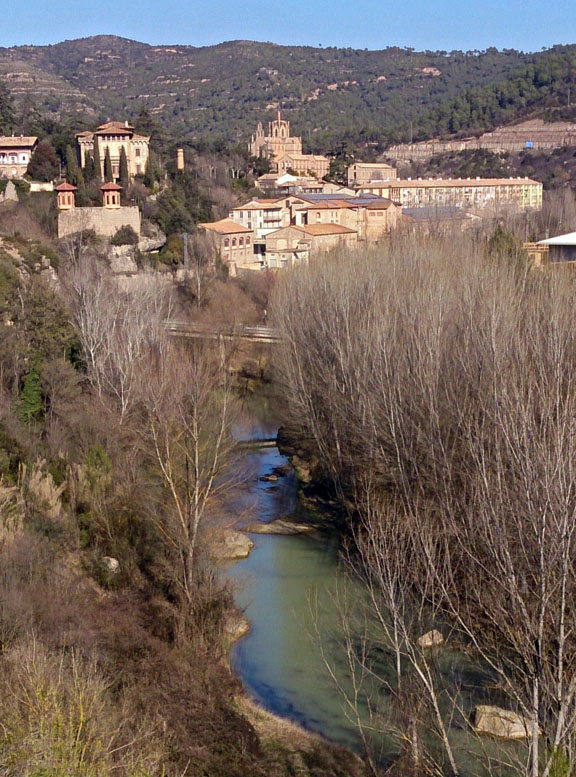
- View of Cal Pons

- Location within Spain Location within Catalonia Location within Province of Barcelona
- Coordinates: 41°58′03.4″N 1°53′05.0″E
- Country: Spain
- A. community: Catalunya
- Province: Barcelona
- Municipality: Puig-reig

Population (January 1, 2024)
  - Total: 114
- Time zone: UTC+01:00
- Postal code: 08692
- MCN: 08175
- Website: Official website

Cal Pons is a singular population entity in the municipality of Puig-reig, in Catalonia, Spain.

As of 2024 it has a population of 114 people.
