= L'Ametlla de Merola =

l'Ametlla de Merola
- Singular population entity
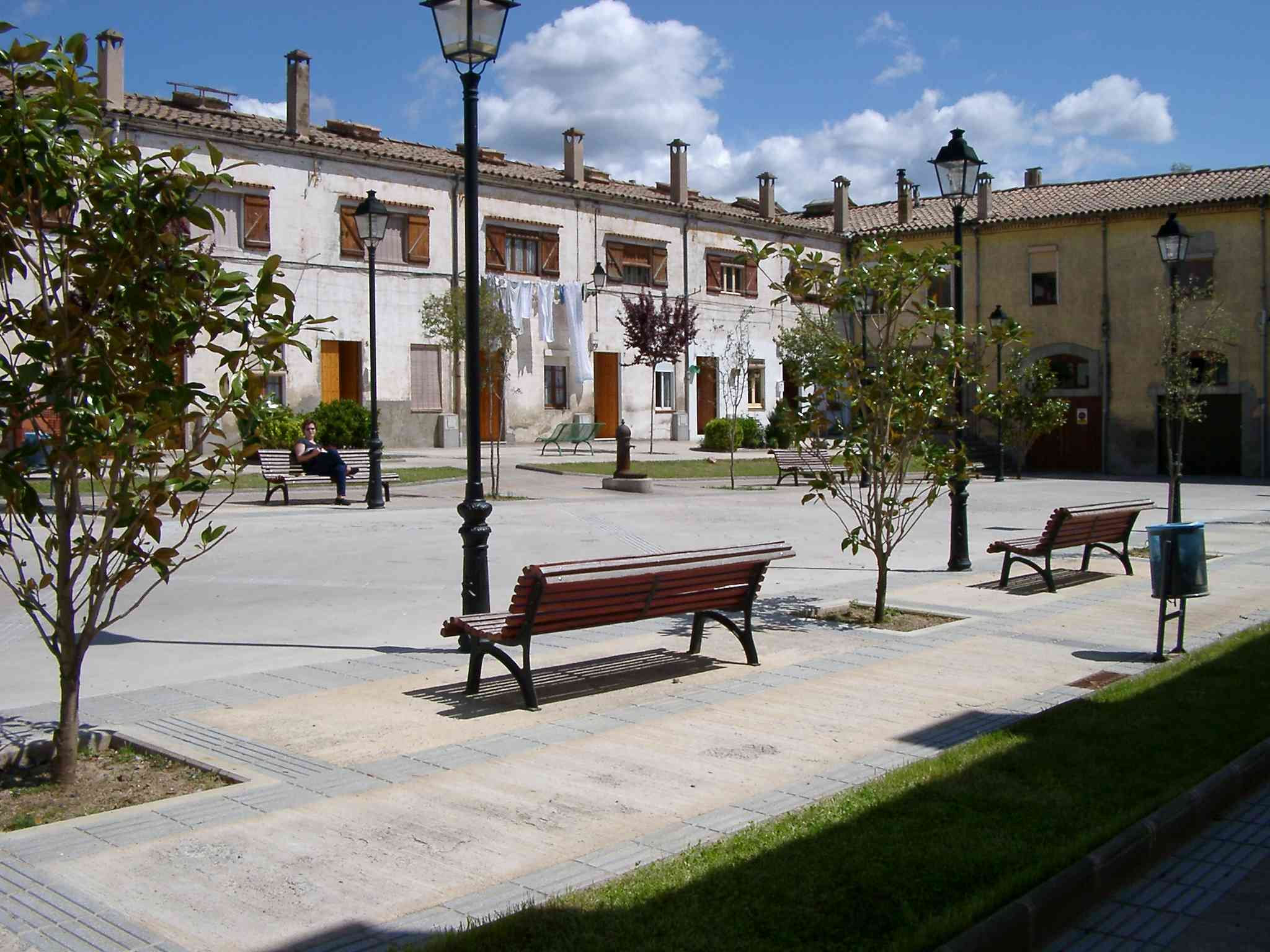
- Marketplace Square, 2001

- Location within Spain Location within Catalonia Location within Province of Barcelona
- Coordinates: 41°54′28.3″N 1°53′01.7″E
- Country: Spain
- A. community: Catalunya
- Province: Barcelona
- Municipality: Puig-reig

Population (January 1, 2024)
  - Total: 183
- Time zone: UTC+01:00
- Postal code: 08672
- MCN: 08175000100
- Website: Official website

l'Ametlla de Merola is a singular population entity in the municipality of Puig-reig, in Catalonia, Spain.

As of 2024 it has a population of 183 people. It is located on the banks of the Llobregat, on the southern slope of the Berguedà comarca in the municipality of Puig-reig, which originated as a textile industrial colony in the last third of the 19th century, whose architectural complex is currently included in the Inventory of the Architectural Heritage of Catalonia.

== Description ==
The urban typology of L'Ametlla is different from that of the other neighborhoods in the Alt Llobregat region. The houses are single-family, two-story, oriented along streets and forming small squares—Church Square, Market Square, Cinema Square—all on one side of the factory. This type of construction is explained by the unique location of the flat land, which made it possible to build these two-story single-family homes with an almost geometric layout. It was a complete neighborhood that included a pharmacy, cinema, theater, café, shops, savings bank, etc.

== History ==
The origins of l'Ametlla date back to 1832, at the mill of Josep Comas i Ametlla, with a small factory producing spinning machines. This nascent economic activity coincided with the era in which the textile industry was taking off in Catalonia. Josep Comas i Ametlla, better known as Josep Ametlla, was well-known in the surrounding area as the owner of Mas Ametlla de Caserres, which, along with the mill's belonging to the parish of Merola, gave the settlement its name. In 1854, Josep Comas i Ametlla sold the mill to a businessman from Balsareny, Francesc Sunyer i Enric. The latter's death before the project was completed led Pere Cruells, his executor, to build a spinning and weaving factory.

However, it wasn't until 1864 that the settlement itself was born, when Mateu Serra i Tauran bought the land and factory from Pere Cruells and began its expansion and the construction of the canal and Carrer Vell. Construction work on the Ametlla de Merola settlement took place between 1864 and 1871. In 1870, the factory began operating and was completed in 1873. By 1878, 500 people were already working at Ametlla. At that time, there were 90 apartments and the "Girls' House," which could accommodate 150 people, had a dining room, kitchen, and bedrooms. The church was built between 1875 and 1882. Initially, the priest, and from 1884, lay teachers were in charge of the boys' school. The Dominican Sisters of Francisco Coll Guitart arrived in 1887 to take over the girls' education and the working girls' residence. In this way, the owner gradually transformed what was a virgin area into a full-fledged village, equipped with services (a shop, theater, café, etc.) that continue to this day. The entire settlement was gradually built from 1880 onward. The last was Montserrat Street in 1928. The teacher from the 1950s to the 1980s was Agustí Albiol.

== Present ==
Over the years, the factory has promoted a series of cultural activities in the neighborhood, which have made Ametlla de Merola stand out from others. These cultural activities have continued even after the factory closed in 1999.

The first associations were religious ("Sant Lluís", "Sant Josep" and "les Filles de Maria"). In 1883 the workers of the factory form an orchestra to play during the festivities. The Christmas performance of "Els Pastorets" (a typical theatrical representation of the Christmas holidays in Catalonia) was almost born at the same time as the colony.

On December 31, 2017, the first prize of the Grossa de Cap d'Any lottery was awarded, with which the cultural association that organizes Els Pastorets distributed eight million euros. Most of the tickets were sold, but some remained for Els Pastorets.
