= Cal Vidal =

- Singular population entity
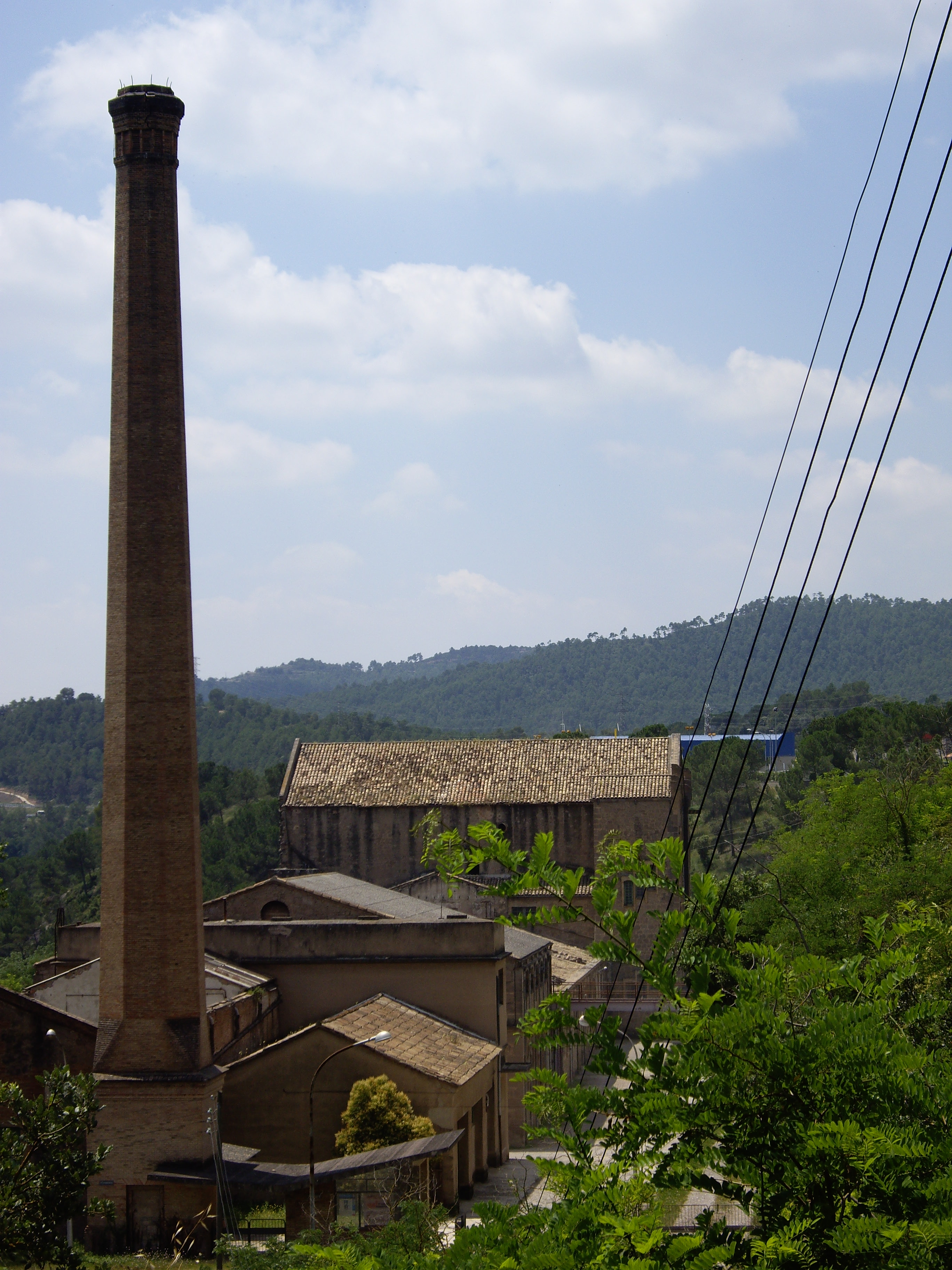
- Colònia Vidal, 2008

- Location within Spain Location within Catalonia Location within Province of Barcelona
- Coordinates: 41°56′41.2″N 1°52′52.4″E
- Country: Spain
- A. community: Catalunya
- Province: Barcelona
- Municipality: Puig-reig

Population (January 1, 2024)
  - Total: 53
- Time zone: UTC+01:00
- Postal code: 08692
- MCN: 08175000500
- Website: Official website

Cal Vidal is a singular population entity in the municipality of Puig-reig, in Catalonia, Spain.

As of 2024 it has a population of 53 people.
