= Minggoy Lopez =

Filipino actor and composer (1912–1981)

- Photo taken from The Freeman, date not given

Background information
- Born: Domingo Abagon Lopez; August 12, 1912; San Nicolas, (Note: San Nicolas was one of the municipalities that amalgamated to become the City of Cebu in 1937.) (Note: The CCP Encyclopedia of Philippine Art states that Lopez "was born [and] raised in the crowded barangay of Pasig," but The Freeman says that his birthplace was in Sitio Kalubihan, a nearby barangay "near the historic Colon and Leon Kilat streets.") Cebu, Philippine Islands, US
- Origin: Cebu City, Philippines
- Died: January 20, 1981 (aged 68)
- Occupations: Actor; singer; songwriter; composer
- Instruments: Singing; guitar
- Years active: 1930–1981
- Spouse: Maria Caridad Falcon (m. 1933)

Domingo Abagon Lopez (August 12, 1912 – January 20, 1981), affectionately known as Minggoy Lopez, was a Filipino actor, singer, songwriter and musician from Cebu City. Known as "Cebu's Music Man", Lopez is remembered as one of the most prolific Cebuano composers, having penned over 200 songs in the language.

Lopez was born in 1912 in San Nicolas. He dropped out after his freshman year of high school to pursue music. Lacking formal training, he taught himself how to play the guitar. In 1930, Lopez became a stage actor and started to write his own songs, initially in an unsuccessful attempt to win over a woman. He moved between acting troupes and also performed in Visayan films, television, and radio dramas.

While part of Piux Kabahar's troupe, Lopez composed "Rosas Pandan" (1938) as the title song of a zarzuela. It eventually became his best-known composition in the 1970s after it was sung by Pilita Corrales. He continued to compose in his later years, spending the early hours of the morning tinkering with his guitar and coming up with lyrics. He died in 1981. The Cebu Provincial Board conferred a Posthumous Lifetime Achievement Award upon Lopez in 2012 and The Freeman listed him as one of the Top 100 Cebuano Personalities, describing his songs as "anthems to Cebuanos."

== Early life ==
Domingo Abagon Lopez was born to a humble family in San Nicolas, Cebu, on August 12, 1912. He was one of five surviving children of Juan Lopez and Basilia Abagon, who were both members of the local church choir. (Note: There were eleven in total, but six died due to pregnancy complications.) Lopez showed an early passion for music. He sang and acted in a zarzuela when he was eight years old and later joined a dance troupe. (Note: The CCP Encyclopedia of Philippine Art describes the play he acted in as "the pastores [a dramatization of the Adoration of the Shepherds] of Nita Alburo." However, it makes no further mention of Alburo.) After his freshman year of high school, Lopez dropped out to pursue music.

Lopez dedicated his days to singing practice and teaching himself to play the guitar. He became a member of a group of musicians named the Zarzuela Cebuana, who were invited to play on ships as entertainment. While the ships were usually bound for Manila, one of them took Lopez as far as Sandakan in North Borneo.

== Career ==
In 1930, 18-year-old Lopez caught the attention of a long-time comedic actor named Badong Yburan, who invited him to join Tirana's Troupe, a group of actors led by Emy Gabuya. After taking on a major role in a play, Lopez garnered praise for his performance and acting became his primary profession.

The same year he started acting, Lopez wrote and composed his first song, "Pagkatam-is", (Note: How Sweet) to impress a woman he was infatuated with. "Pagkatam-is" was performed at a singing contest in San Nicolas by Diosdado Alferez, where it won first prize. Lopez's second song, "Karon Pa Lamang", (Note: Only Now) also proved popular, as did "Kagahapon ug Karon". (Note: Yesterday and Today) These songs were examples of the balitaw—a Filipino genre of folk music about love. Lopez dedicated another song to his sweetheart titled "Daw sa Magisi". Although he failed to win her over, he continued to produce songs.

After leaving Gabuya's group, Lopez joined the theatrical troupe of Piux Kabahar. During his time with Piux Kabahar's company, Lopez wrote and composed "Rosas Pandan" (1938), with a libretto by Kabahar. The song was originally the title track for a zarzuela of the same name. It was later adapted into a movie directed by Toting Villarino from a script written by Kabahar. Lopez's balitaw, "Bukidnon", was performed in the film.

Lopez moved on from Kabahar to Villarino's troupe, whose members regularly performed at the Teatro Oriente. He later joined the Antingan Troupe, led by Leox and Tancred Juezan. Outside of the stage, Lopez appeared in Visayan radio dramas, television productions such as Maria Flor de Luna, and films such as Timbu Mata (1948), Dimakaling, and Aliyana (1974).

Many of Lopez's songs were recorded by D' Sound Recording, which was managed by Jhul Antopina, a songwriter and record producer. These songs include "Sala sa Panahon" (Note: Time's Fault) and "Hagki Ako", (Note: My Kiss) sung by Yelly Albino. Lopez also wrote Christmas carols such as "Pasko sa Buta" (Note: A Blindman's Christmas) and "Maayong Pasko, Tagbalay", (Note: Merry Christmas, Householder) which was sung by Sergs de la Peña and became very popular in the Visayas and Mindanao. "Ayaw Gayod Palipat", (Note: Don't Be Fooled) composed by Lopez and sung by the Zabala sisters, earned D' Sound Recording a lot of sales. Another one of Lopez's songs, "Salimuang sa Hubog", (Note: Delirium of a Drunkard) was considered a masterpiece. Originally sung by the local actor and broadcaster Eking Gutierrez, it was popularized by the singer Armistice Abayan in the 1970s.

== Personal life and death ==
Lopez married Maria Caridad Falcon, an aspiring actress from Sogod, Leyte, in 1933. The couple had three surviving children: Adela, Domingo, Jr. and Rebecca. (Note: His wife gave birth to six other children who did not survive.) After his wife died on January 3, 1973, Lopez was distraught and reminded of his own mortality. In 1974, he recorded all of his songs on cassette tapes and put them together in an album, Panamilit: Kasaysayan sa Kinabuhi ni Minggoy Lopez, (Note: Farewell: Story of the Life of Minggoy Lopez) to ensure that his compositions would not be forgotten after he died himself.

Before dying in his sleep on January 20, 1981, Lopez used his remaining years to keep making songs. Rebecca remembered him as a firm but good man and said that while she and her siblings "were aware that money was very limited [...] I don't remember having to worry whether we had something to eat or if he could send us to school." Her husband, Alfredo Montaño, wrote that "like other Cebuano composers who were victims of injustice by some recording companies, Minggoy died a poor man."

== Artistry ==
Lopez was a self-taught musician who lacked formal training. He was friends with other Cebuano composers, including Ben Zubiri ("Matud Nila") and Pidong Villaflor. He often hung out with Villaflor in Kalubihan, Cebu City, especially while Villaflor was composing a song. Although Lopez learned to read music from Villaflor, his initial inability to do so never stopped him from producing songs himself.

Dubbed "Cebu's Music Man", Lopez wrote over 200 songs and is believed to be one of the most prolific Cebuano composers. Montaño has said that the exact number of Lopez's compositions is unknown because Lopez made songs for anyone who asked and gave them away rather than releasing them commercially. During his father-in-law's later years, Montaño recalled that Lopez always woke up very early in the morning to tinker with his guitar and think up lyrics: "By seven o'clock in the morning, he already had one or two compositions."

Some of his contemporaries wrote their lyrics in English or Tagalog before translating them to Cebuano, but Lopez wrote songs directly in the Cebuano language. Much of Lopez's oeuvre consists of songs about love and relationships—especially in the form of the balitaw—but he also wrote about themes such as the environment, social justice, advice to women, and women's contributions to societal change. Cebu City's The Freeman listed "Rosas Pandan", "Kamingaw sa Payag", "Kagahapon ug Karon", "Krutsay Sakayanon", "Bukidnon", "Pag-utlan sa Gugma" and "Salimuang sa Hubog" as popular hits by Lopez.

== Legacy ==
Lopez received several awards and honors posthumously. On August 11, 2012, Lopez was one of four recipients of the Garbo sa Sugbo Posthumous Lifetime Achievement Awards, which are conferred annually. Later in the year, the Jose R. Gullas Halad Museum in Cebu City ran an exhibition on Lopez from September 29 to October 25. It featured Lopez's photos, trophies, and awards, as well as the original manuscripts and cassette recordings of his compositions, released and unreleased songs, and his reel-to-reel tape recorders, all donated by his family. These were in the possession of the museum along with his guitar. In 2019, The Freeman listed Lopez as one of the Top 100 Cebuano Personalities. It described Minggoy Lopez as "a musical icon" whose songs have become "anthems to Cebuanos."

"Rosas Pandan" is Lopez's best-known composition. It was popularized by the Filipino singer Pilita Corrales, who performed and released a Tagalog translation by Levi Celerio in the 1970s. The Freeman's Ruben Almendras later opined that the song's cadence and "oomph" had been lost in translation, pointing out in particular Celerio's excision of the non-lexical vocables such as ayay, ayayay, and tikadong from the original Cebuano lyrics. However, a Cebuano version was later released to honor Corrales' Cebuano heritage, and many people now recognize "Rosas Pandan" as a Cebuano or Visayan song. It is one of her most noted songs. "Rosas Pandan" has endured into the 21st century as it has been performed by choirs internationally.

== Translations ==
All titles translated from Cebuano.
