= Polifònica de Puig-reig =

- Choir
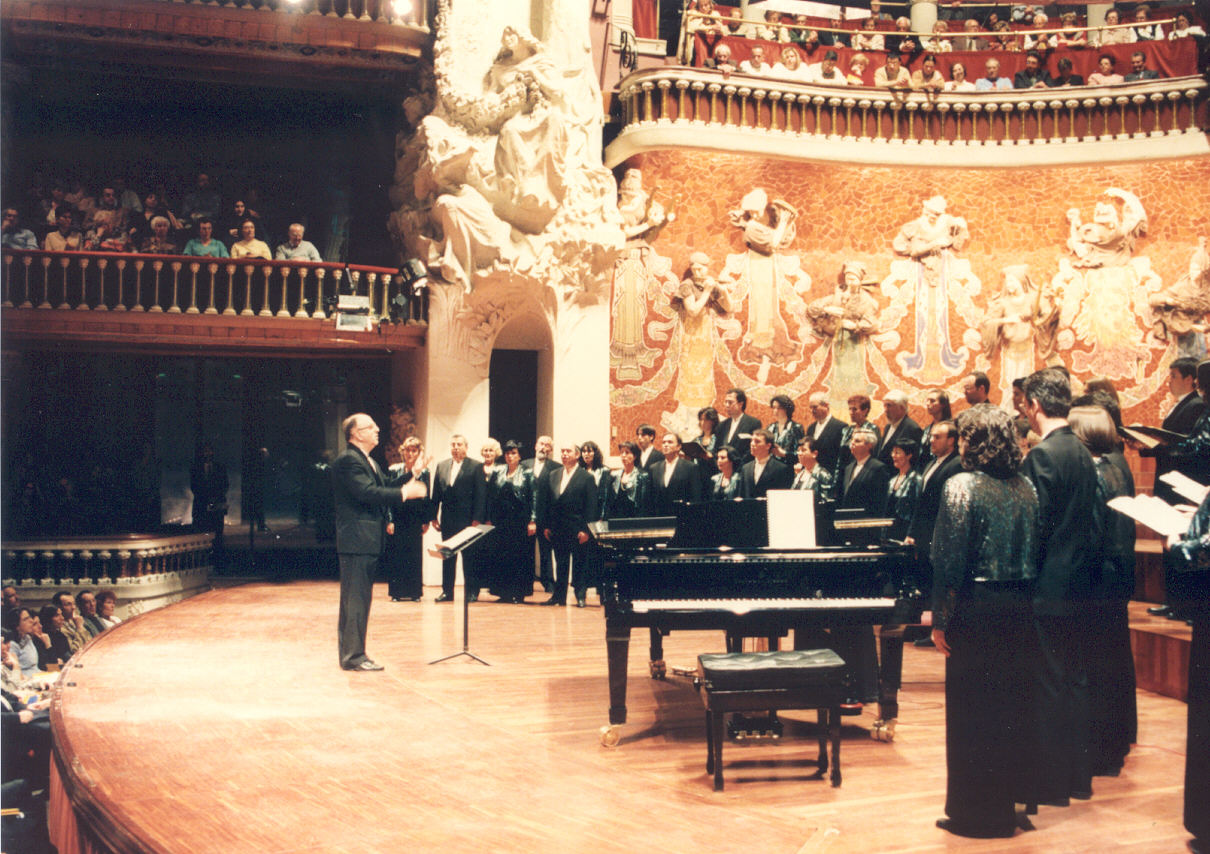
- Polifònica de Puig-reig at the Palau de la Música
- Former name: Coral Joventut Sardanista
- Founder: Ramon Noguera
- Director: Emmanuel Niubó and Josep Maria Conangla

The Polifònica de Puig-reig is a choral organization from Puig-Reig in Catalonia that was created in 1968 as Coral Joventut Sardanista (The Sardanista Youth Choir) coming from the Sardanista group of the same name. In 1987 the name changed to Polifònica de Puig-reig. From 1969, Ramon Noguera had served as its director for 46 years, and it is currently co-directed by Emmanuel Niubó and Josep Maria Conangla, the later having been Noguera's assistant director.

From its inception, the choir has carried out a trajectory of growing musical activity that has led it to perform all over Catalonia, Europe and other places around the world. In 1992, Polifònica accompanied the President de la Generalitat de Catalunya on an official trip to Argentina and Chile. Despite being an amateur choir, it collaborates with professional choirs, such as the Liceu.

== Bibliography ==
- Serra Rotés, Rosa; Viladés i Llorens, Ramon. La Polifònica de Puig-reig. 25è aniversari. Berga: Ajuntament de Puig-reig i Polifònica de Puig-reig, 1993. ISBN 84-606-1217-1.
