= St Martin's Church, Puig-reig =

Church building in Puig-reig, Spain

Coordinates: 41°58′15″N 1°52′53″E

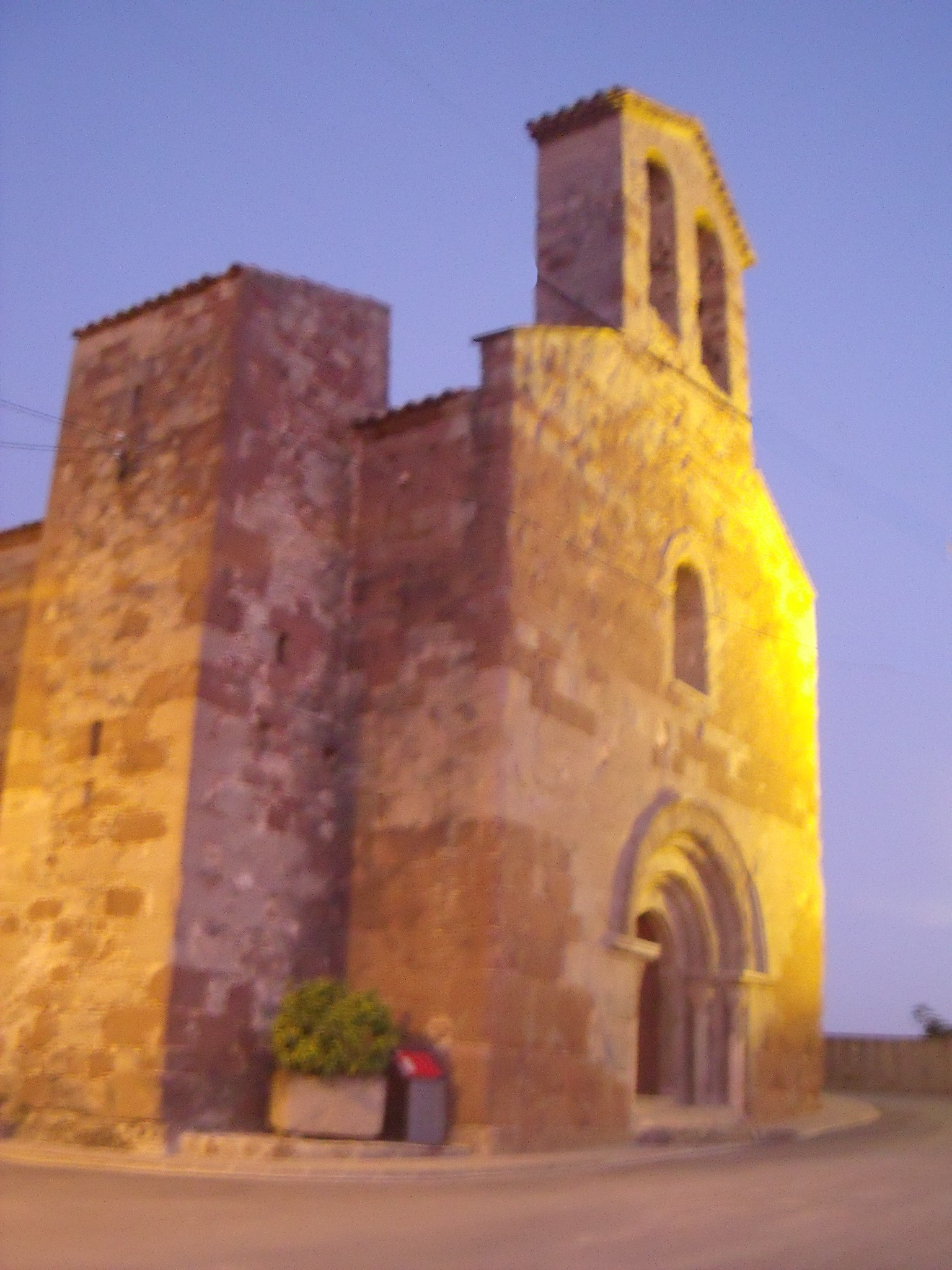
Sant Martí de Puig-reig

St Martin's Church (Catalan: Sant Martí de Puig-reig (Catalan pronunciation: [ˈsam məɾˈti ðə ˌpuˈretʃ]) is a Romanesque church from 12th century in Puig-reig, Spain, near the modern parochial church and the former Puig-reig Castle.

== Exterior ==
The church's construction comprises large stone blocks of various sizes, and its thick side-walls are carried by a number of side-buttresses. The exterior of the church is completely plain, without ornamentation, except at the west wall. Atop the west wall stands the bell-gable with its twin openings, and below it is the main door, which has a simple three-arch archivolt, supported in part by four columns and their capitals.

== Interior ==
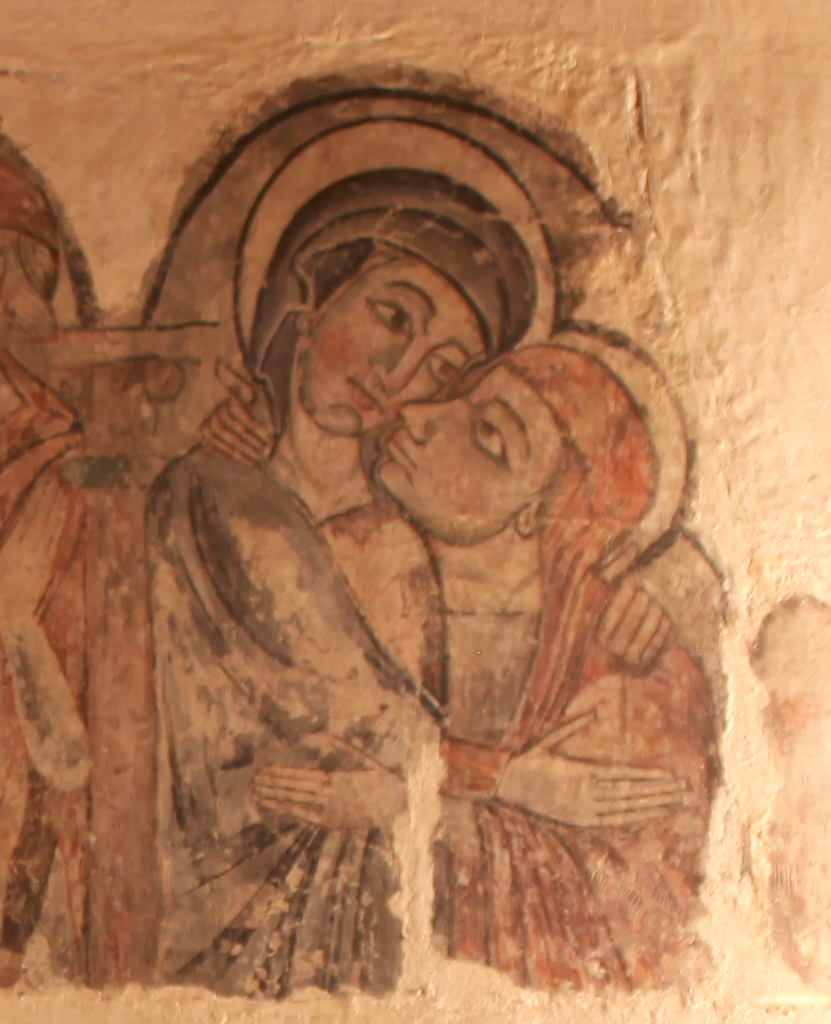
Detail of mural paintings

The church has a single nave, covered with a barrel vault and finished by a semicircular apse. The apse vault begins as a simple-impost cornice, and is separated from the nave by a triumphal arch. At its rear is a single narrow window, vaulted with a voussoir arch. It still contains some of its original Romanesque murals.
