= Pio Kabahar =

Filipino Visayan writer, journalist and director of first Cebuano film

Piux Kabahar
- Born: October 11, 1892; San Nicolas, Cebu City
- Died: March 7, 1977 (aged 84); Cebu City
- Occupations: Playwright; Writer; Journalist; Director; Composer
- Writing career
- Language: Cebuano
- Genres: Film; Stage Plays; Zarzuelas

Pio Abelgas Kabahar (October 11, 1892 – March 7, 1977), also known as Piux A. Kabahar, was a Cebuano composer, playwright, journalist, and director. He was best known as a playwright, he was the director of the first Cebuano moving picture, Bertoldo ug Balodoy.

== Early life ==
Pio Kabahar was born to the couple Justo Kabahar and Margarita Abelgas in San Nicolas, Cebu on October 11, 1892. He was influenced by his father who was a musician, and he played violin for the Mauricia Gahuman's dancing hall, as well as other musical instruments such as the mandolin, guitar, cello, banjo, bandurria, kubing, and percussions. When he had saved enough, he paid for his studies at the Cebu Provincial High School.

== Career ==
He first taught at Recoleto Central School for four years and then became a writer. His time saw the emergence of the press that regularly published works of the local artist, whose styles were imitations of American novels and influenced by the translations of European fiction. Kabahar's works in stage drama exhibited similar shift, added with social criticism and entertainment as evident in the works of other playwrights such as Buenaventura Rodriguez and Florentino Borromeo.

=== Stage plays ===
Later, he became a playwright, particularly of zarzuelas. The music of his zarzuelas were his own composition as well as the compositions of Manuel Velez, Jose Estella, and Pidong Villaflor. In addition, he also directed his plays and the works of his contemporaries including Buenaventura Rodriguez, Jacinto Alcor, and Fernando Alfon. He also wrote the Rosas Pandan.

In 1935, he co-founded Cebu Musical Dramatic Art Studio together with Fernando Alfon and Vicente Castillo. The organization's aim was to develop the arts in Cebu.

Kabahar's stages plays were influenced by Rodriguez, with the distinction that Kabahar wrote comedy while Rodriguez wrote reflective drama. Gugma sa Inahan (Mother's Love) was considered the best among his works that featured themes of national independence and criticism on the effects of colonization.

=== Director ===
Kabahar was the writer and director of the first Cebuano moving picture, Bertoldo ug Balodoy in 1939 and Rosas Pandan.

=== Journalism ===
Aside from writing and directing, he also edited Cebuano section of the periodicals La Revolucion, La Solidaridad, El Espectador, and The Advertiser. He was editor in chief of the following publications: Ang Bandila, Ang Buhat, Ang Sidlakan, and The Freeman, as well as publisher of the newspapers Ang Katarungan, Juan dela Cruz, El Espectador, Nasud, The Freeman, and Ang Tigmantala.

His column in The Freeman entitled Katawa (Laughter) was a popular humorous section of the periodical in the late 1920s, which formed part of the Bertoldo ug Balodoy that he would create years later.

=== Cebu municipal board ===
Kabahar also served as secretary to the Municipal Board of Cebu and became member of the council from 1932 until 1962.

== Later years ==
He was awarded Rizal Pro Patria Award on June 19, 1961. He died on March 7, 1977, a largely forgotten man.

== Historical commemoration ==
- A street in Guadalupe, Cebu City was named in his honor.

== Works ==
=== Zarzuelas ===
- Nagun-uba sa Lan- git (1917)
- Ang Ismirismis (1919)
- Hm! (1919)
- Alaut(1919)
- Fe, Esperanza, Caridad (1920)
- Fifi (1929)
- Gugma sa Inahan (1933)
- Mr ug Mrs (1940)

=== Plays ===
- Limbong ni Tintay (1916)
- Miss Dolying (1920)
- Kasingkasing (1921)
- Aling Pulana (1923)
- Santo Papa (1931)
- Sinakit (1933)
- Tulo Ka Adlaw sa Langit (1933)

=== Films ===
- Bertoldo ug Balodoy (1939)
- Rosas Pandan
