= Puig-reig =

- Municipality
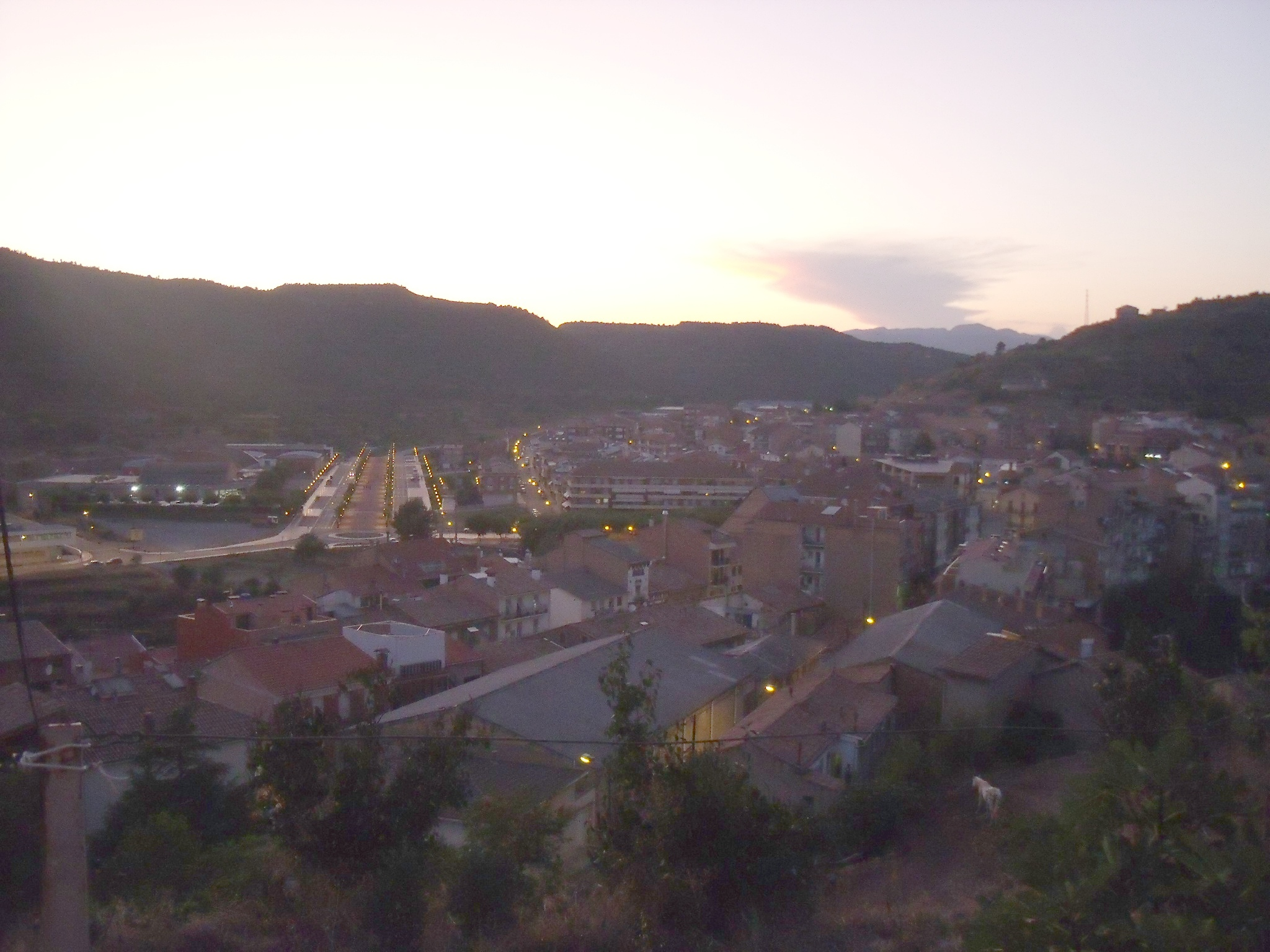

- Coat of arms

- Location in Catalonia Puig-reig (Spain)
- Coordinates: 41°58′27″N 1°52′50″E
- Country: Spain
- Community: Catalonia
- Province: Barcelona
- Comarca: Berguedà

Government
  - Mayor: Josep Maria Altarriba Roca (2015) (JxP-ERC-AM)

Area
  - Total: 45.8 km^{2} (17.7 sq mi)
- Elevation: 455 m (1,493 ft)

Population (2025-01-01)
  - Total: 4,565
  - Density: 99.7/km^{2} (258/sq mi)
- Demonym(s): Puig-regenc, puig-regenca
- Website: www.puig-reig.cat

Puig-reig (Old Catalan for 'King's Hill'; Catalan pronunciation: [ˌpu(dʒ)ˈretʃ]) is a municipality and town in the comarca of Berguedà, Catalonia. As of 2009, the town had a population of 4,403.

Atop a hill overlooking the Llobregat River, the town includes two medieval fortresses, as well as numerous examples of Romanesque and Gothic architecture. Industrial and vernacular architecture can also be found in the numerous industrial colonies and masies, or farm houses, within the limits of the municipality.

It is also home to La Polifònica de Puig-reig, a major amateur choir renowned across Catalonia as well as internationally.

== History ==
Excavations at the sites of Serrat de l'Oca and Serrat dels Lladres reveal that there were stable human settlements within the municipality prior to the 8th century BC. These inhabitants practiced agriculture, as evidenced by their use of rock-cut silos for grain storage. A subsequent wave of substantial settlement left behind significant structural and ceramic remains dating to around the 4th century BC.

The existence of the town of Puig-reig is first documented in 907 AD, at the consecration of St Martin's Church. The church of Sant Martí served as the church for the castle of Puig-reig, a small fortification perched atop a hill that overlooked the valley. Within its territory, there were significant properties held by the Counts of Cerdanya and Barcelona, the monasteries of Ripoll, Sarrateix, and La Portella, and from the 11th century onwards, the Viscounts of Berguedà, who rebuilt the fortress.

The Knights Templar received many properties in the territory, notably from the troubadour Viscount Guilhem de Berguedan, who bequeathed the castle itself as well as its surrounding territory to the Knights. From this castle, a new commandery was established to administer the Order’s entire estate across the Berguedà and Cerdanya regions, an arrangement that would persist under various names until the 19th century.

However, the presence of the Hospitallers in Puig-reig was marked by a long, progressive decline; the demographic and economic crises of the 14th century caused significant disruption to the site, and by 1585, the Commander declared the castle complex uninhabitable. Between the 16th and 18th centuries, the large farmsteads (masies) of medieval origin (such as El Lledó, La Serra de Cap de Costa, Trasserra, La Sala, Les Comes, Farriols, El Soler de Jaumàs, La Cortada, L’Alsina) were strengthened, while new ones (including Vilarrasa, Madrona, Trulls, Pellicer, Periques) also emerged. The situation changed in the final third of the 19th century when cotton spinning and weaving factories were established along the Llobregat River, making use of former flour mills. The rapid economic growth that followed expanded the town greatly.

The 1995 Festival Internacional de Cant Coral Catalunya Centre was held in Puig-reig, one that would mark a milestone in Filipino music. At the closing concert on 3 September 1995, international choirs from the Philippines, the Czech Republic, Ukraine and Italy, had been invited to perform alongside Catalan ensembles. According to San Francisco-based music director George Gemora Hernandez, festival organisers asked him to provide a piece for the closing celebration, to be performed by more than 1,000 singers from the participating choirs. Hernandez proposed an arrangement of Rosas Pandan, based on the original Cebuano-language version by Filipino composer Domingo "Minggoy" Lopez. Participating choirs introduced the arrangement to audiences in their respective countries, contributing to its international circulation. By 2019, more than twenty international choral performances had been identified, including recordings by ensembles from the United States, Canada, Brazil, Colombia, Russia, South Korea and New Zealand. Hernandez's arrangement subsequently became widely performed by choirs internationally.

== Main sights ==
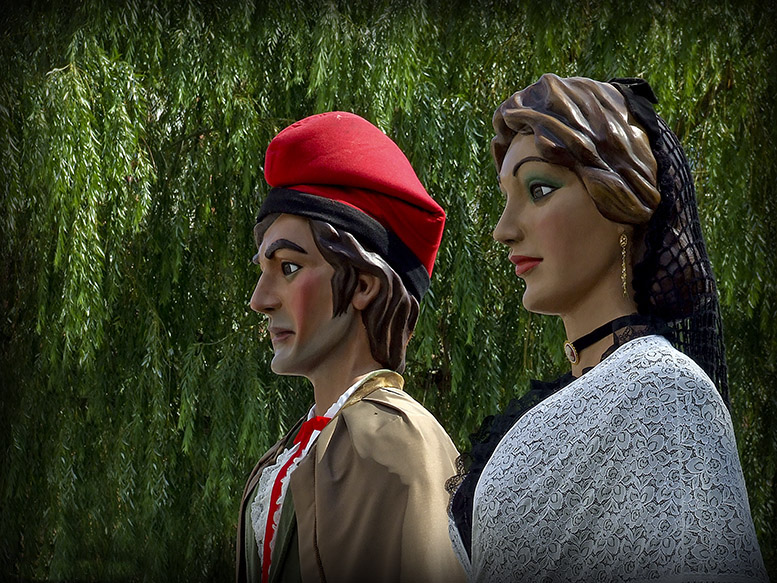
Marti i Carme Giants of Puig-reig in Plaça Nova in Puig-reig

- The Puig-Reig Castle, documented in the year 907 and progressively expanded in the 12th and 13th centuries.
- St Martin's Church, a Romanesque church from the 12th century with three murals from the 13th century.
- The Merola castle, tower remnant of the former Castle in Merola. The castle was first documented in the 12th century, and was a royal possession by the 14th century.
