= Seal of Dagupan =

Versions
- Seal from 1948–2012
- Armiger: Dagupan
- Adopted: 2012
- Motto: City of Dagupan; Sigue Dagupan
- Earlier version: 1948-2012
- Use: Official documents and marked vehicles of the City Government of Dagupan

The Seal of Dagupan is one of the official symbols of Dagupan.

== 1948 seal ==
Dagupan previously used a seal design from 1948 to 2012 which was designed by Archbishop Mariano Madriaga. The elements of the seal includes a horseshoe magnet, a railway, a road, and a ribbon bearing the words "Sigue Dagupan". It was submitted and approved by the Philippine Heraldry Committee. Railroad and highway were added to emphasize the city's geographic location and to stress the strategic role it played to establish Dagupan as the trading post of the North.

According to Mayor Benjamin Lim, the seal was never registered with the National Historical Commission and the Department of the Interior and Local Government.

== Current seal ==
The current Dagupan seal was derived from a logo design competition concluded in early 2011 which was eligible for residents of the city. The winning seal design was unveiled by May 2011 which was conceptualized by Carmelo John E. Vidal, a holder of a master's degree in public administration and a doctorate in arts.

The four previous elements of the 1948 seal was add upon. Among the new symbols integrated in the seal are: a milkfish, 31 stars which signifies the constituent barangays of the city; seven wave crests which represents the city's rivers, a torch which signifies education, and a gear which represents commerce.

The National Historical Commission of the Philippines' Chair Maria Serena I. Diokno and Paquito Ochoa, Jr. signed the Certificate of the new Dagupan Seal. Mayor Benjamin S. Lim officially received on December 9, 2012, the certificate of registration for this city's new corporate seal from Secretary Mar Roxas (Republic Act 7160) permanently abandoning the 68-year-old logo and seal.
