= Lyceum-Northwestern University =

Private university in Pangasinan, Philippines

Lyceum-Northwestern University, Inc.
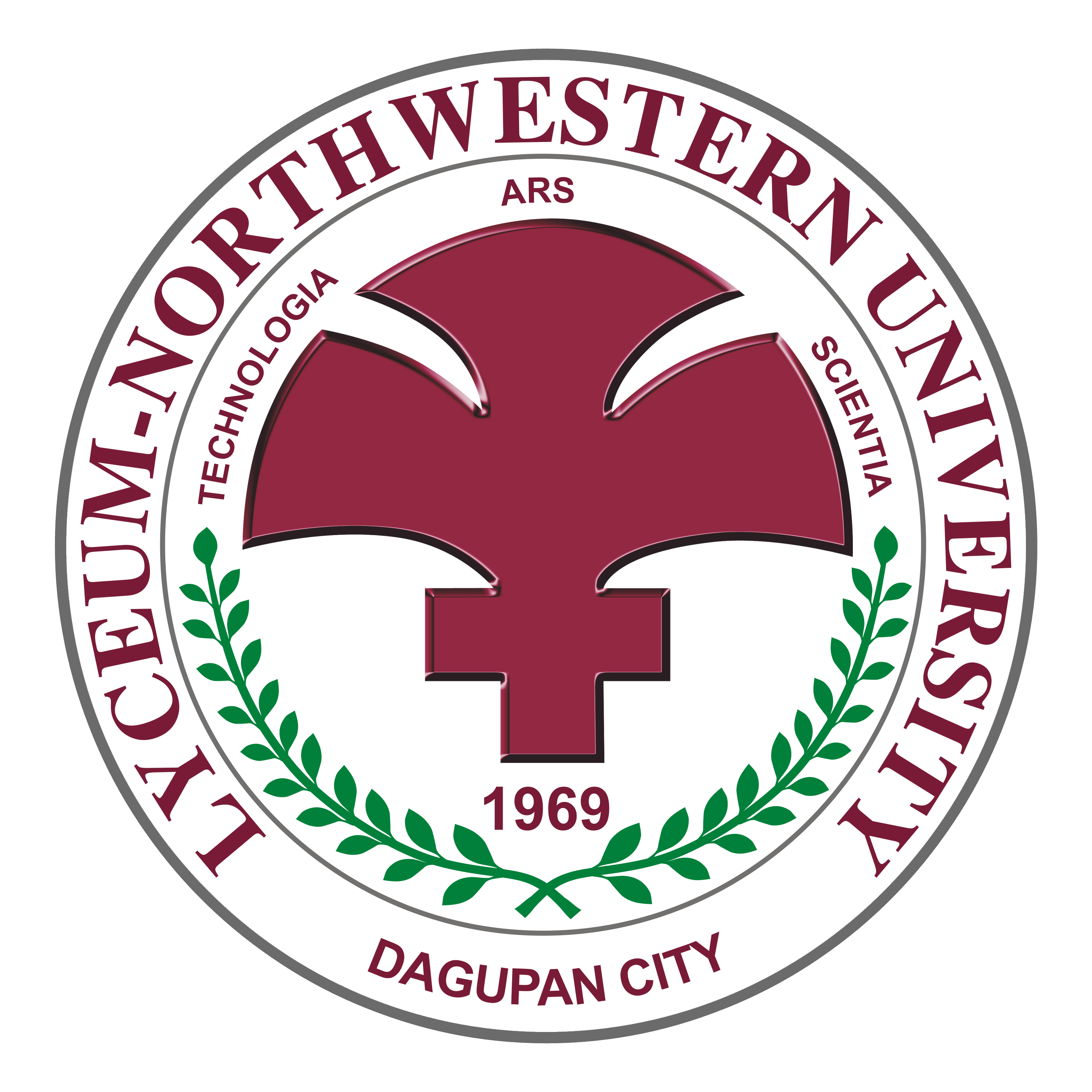
- Motto: Technologia, Ars, Scientia
- Motto in English: Technology, Art, Science
- Type: Private Non-sectarian Coeducational higher education institution
- Established: 1969; 57 years ago
- Chairman: Francisco Tiongson Duque III
- Chancellor: Gonzalo T. Duque
- President: Luz T. Duque-Hammershaimb
- Students: 9,000
- Location: Tapuac District, Dagupan, Pangasinan, Philippines; 16°02′08″N 120°19′49″E
- Campus: 2.3 hectares (23,000 m^{2})
- Colors: Maroon and Gray
- Nickname: Dukes
- Sporting affiliations: Universities and Colleges Athletic Association of Pangasinan
- Website: www.lyceum.edu.ph
- Location in Luzon Location in the Philippines

Lyceum-Northwestern University (L-NU) is a medical college located in Dagupan, Philippines, founded by Francisco Quimson Duque and Florencia Tiongson Duque in 1969.

Lyceum-Northwestern University though bearing the name Lyceum is not affiliated with Lyceum of the Philippines University since LPU is the first institution in the country to bear the name Lyceum.

== History ==
Lyceum-Northwestern started as a single-room nursing school at the Dagupan City Polyclinic Hospital and was then called the Dagupan City School of Nursing. In 1974, Dr. Duque acquired the Northwestern Educational Institution. From the merger emerged the name Lyceum-Northwestern. In the latter part of the year, Lyceum-Northwestern spearheaded a consortium of local tertiary schools and founded the Northern Philippines Institute of Medicine. Lyceum-Northwestern became the "first medical school of the north." The institute began with an enrollment of 19 students. The consortium lasted two years.

On November 19, 2001, Lyceum-Northwestern was granted its university status.

== Degree Programs ==
ALLIED MEDICAL PROGRAMS

  BS in Medical Laboratory Science
  BS in Nursing
  BS in Nutrition & Dietetics
  BS in Pharmacy
  BS in Physical Therapy
  BS in Psychology
  BS in Radiologic Technology
  Doctor of Medicine
  Doctor of Dental Medicine
  Doctor of Optometry

LIBERAL ARTS & EDUCATION PROGRAMS

 BA in English
 BA in Mass Communication
 BA in Political Science
 Bachelor of Arts (A.B.ETEAAP)
 Bachelor of Elementary Education
 Bachelor of Secondary Education (Majors in English, Physical Science, Social Science, Mathematics, & Filipino)
 Bachelor of Physical Education

BUSINESS, HOSPITALITY, & SOCIAL SCIENCE PROGRAMS

 BS in Accountancy
 BS in Entrepreneurship
 BS in Tourism Management
 BS in Hospitality Management
 BS in Business Administration (Majors in Marketing Management, Human Resources Development Management, Financial Management)
 BS in Criminal Justice Education (Criminology)

TECHNICAL-VOCATIONAL PROGRAMS

 RAC Servicing NC II
 Electrical Installation Maintenance NC II
 Shielded Metal Arc Welding NC II
 Caregiving NC II
 Health Care Services NC II
 Automotive Servicing NC II

POST GRADUATE PROGRAMS

 Juris Doctor (Bachelor of Laws)
 Doctor of Business Administration
 Doctor of Education
 Doctor of Philosophy (Ph.D.) (Ph.D. in Filipino Language, Science Education, Language Teaching, Educational Management)
 Doctor of Public Administration
 Master in Public Administration
 Master of Arts in Education
 Master in Public Health
 Master of Arts in Nursing

NON-THESIS PROGRAMS

 Master in Education (Majors in English, Mathematics, General Science/Biology, Social Studies, Filipino, Chemistry, Technical and Livelihood Education (T.L.E.)

ENGINEERING MARITIME EDUCATION & INFORMATION TECHNOLOGY PROGRAMS

 BS in Architecture
 BS in Civil Engineering
 BS in Computer Engineering
 BS in Electrical Engineering
 BS in Electronics & Communication Engineering
 BS in Mechanical Engineering
 BS in Marine Engineering
 BS in Computer Science
 BS in Information Technology
 BS in Marine Transportation

== Sports ==
- Salvador T. Duque Fieldhouse (Indoor Gymnasium and Basketball Court)
- 2 outdoor basketball courts
- 2 outdoor tennis courts
- 1 outdoor volleyball courts
- 1 football field
- 1 Olympic-sized swimming pool and 1 regular Pool
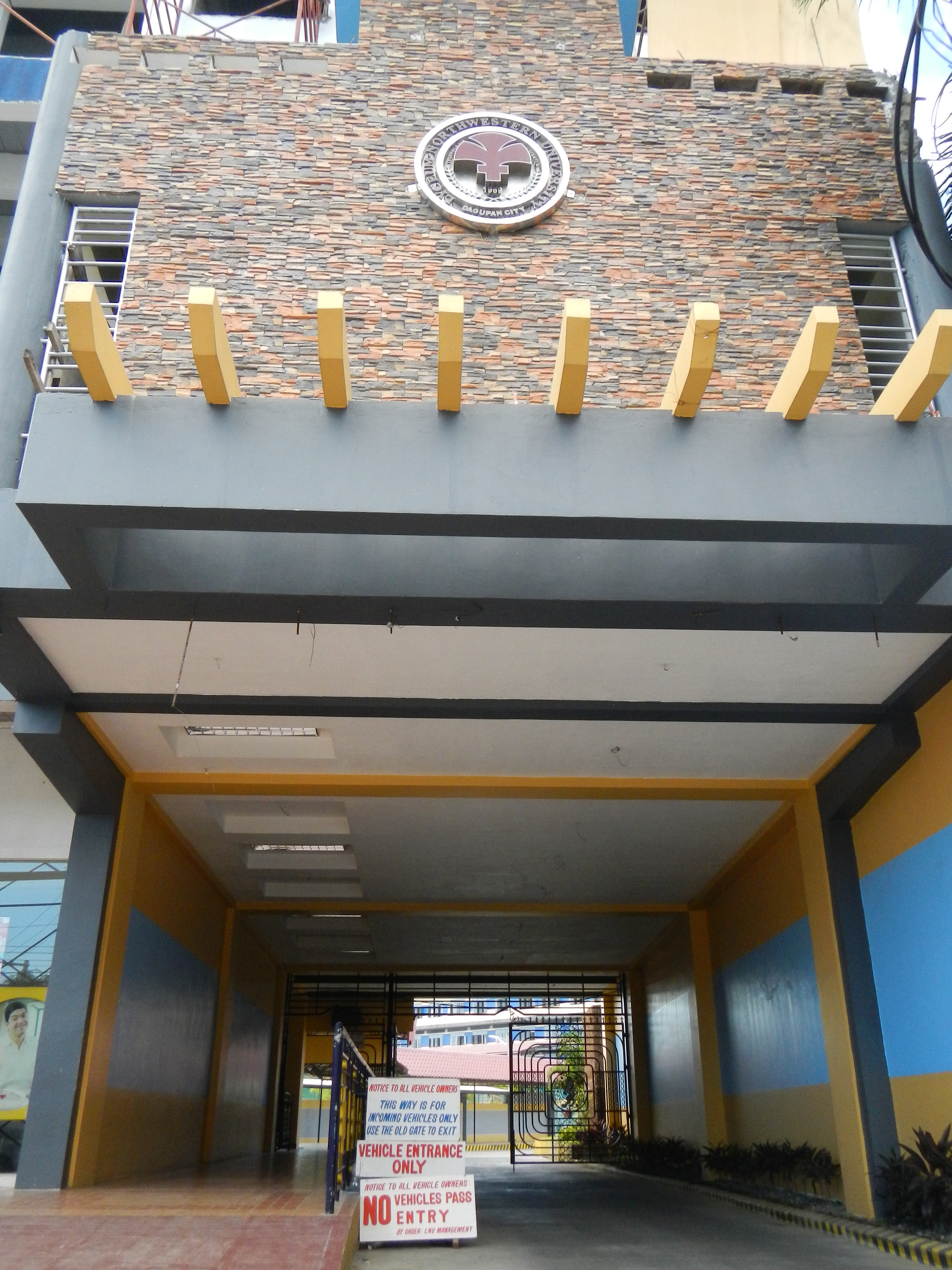
Front

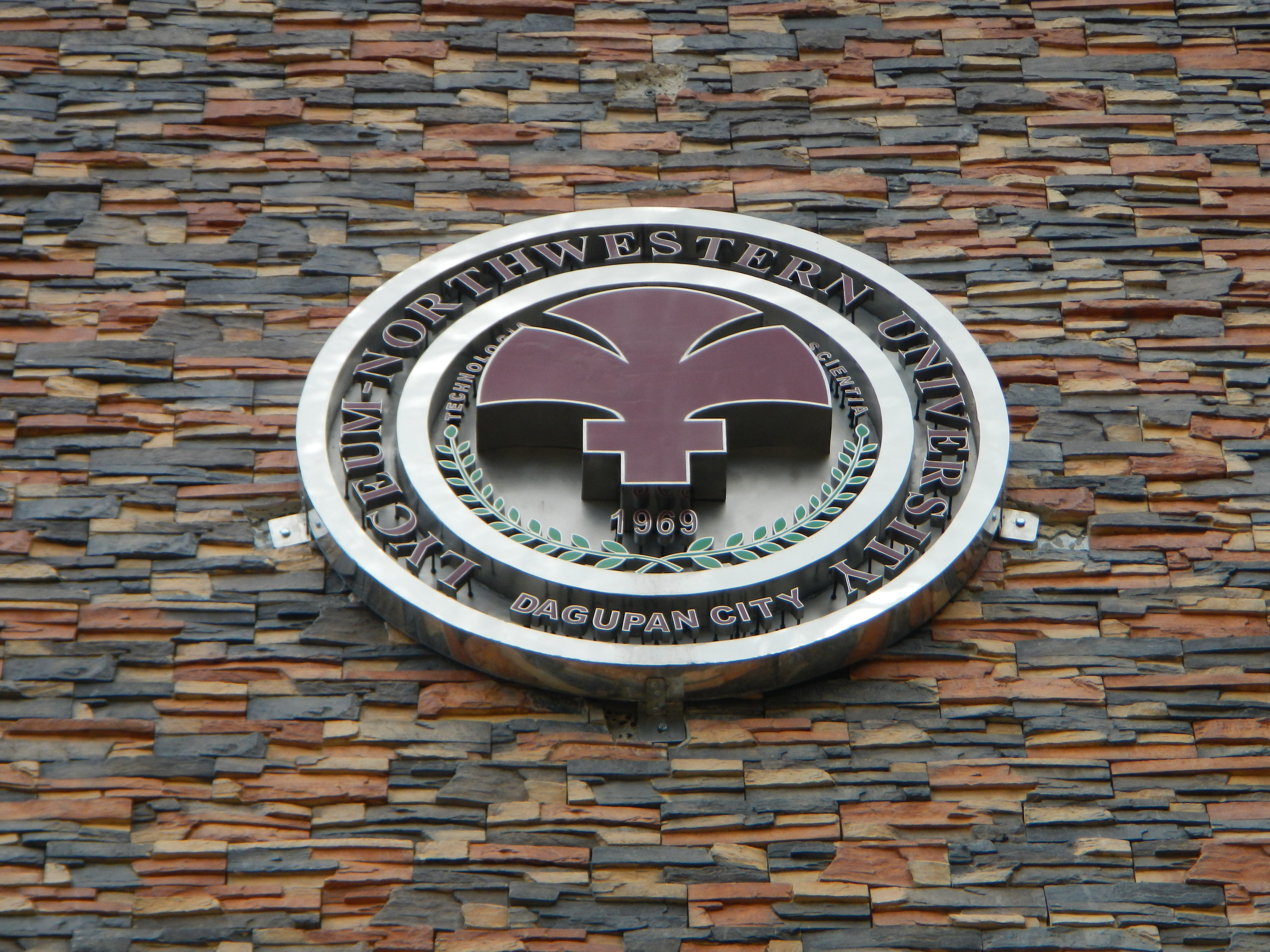
Logo

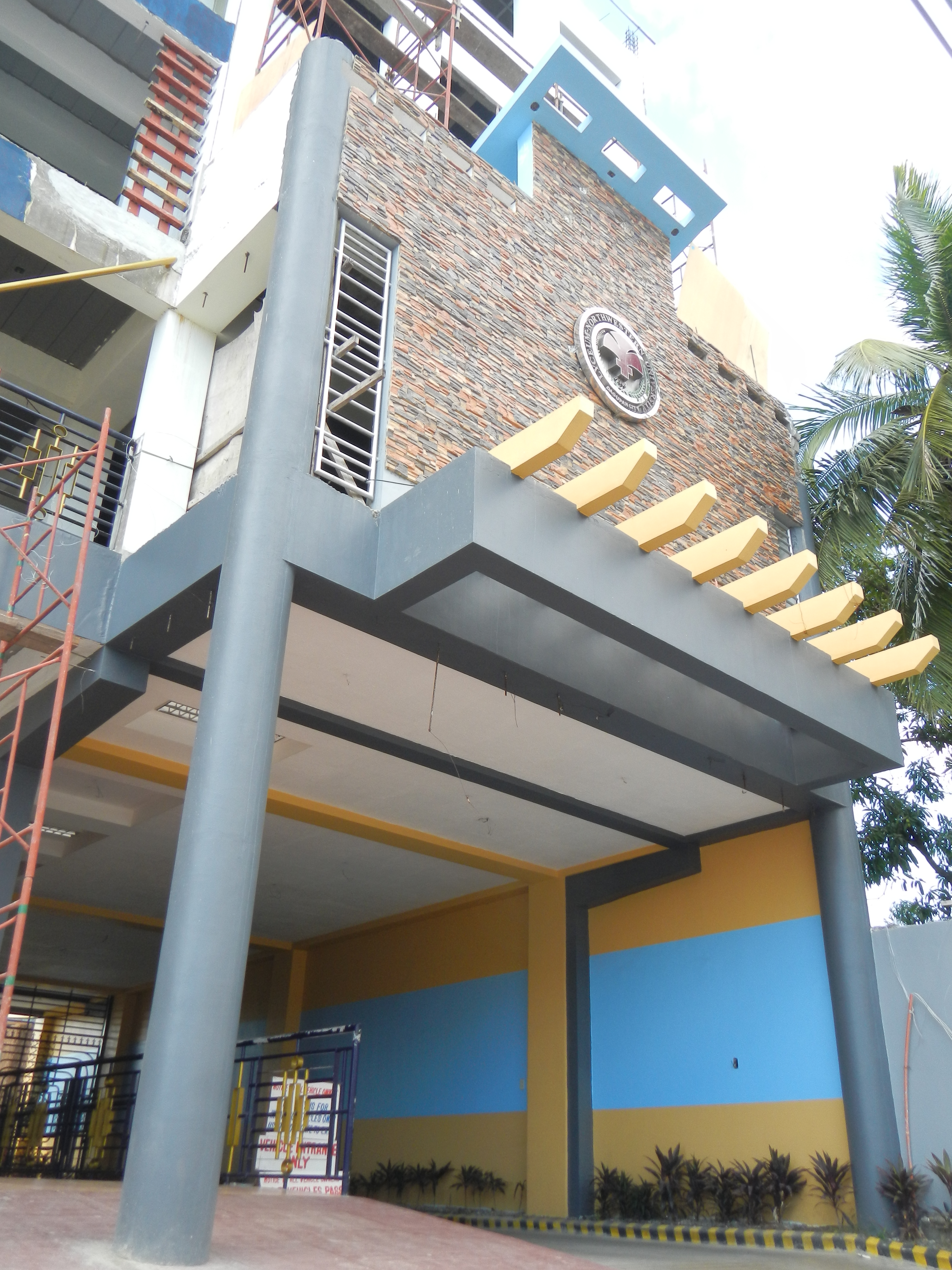
Entrance

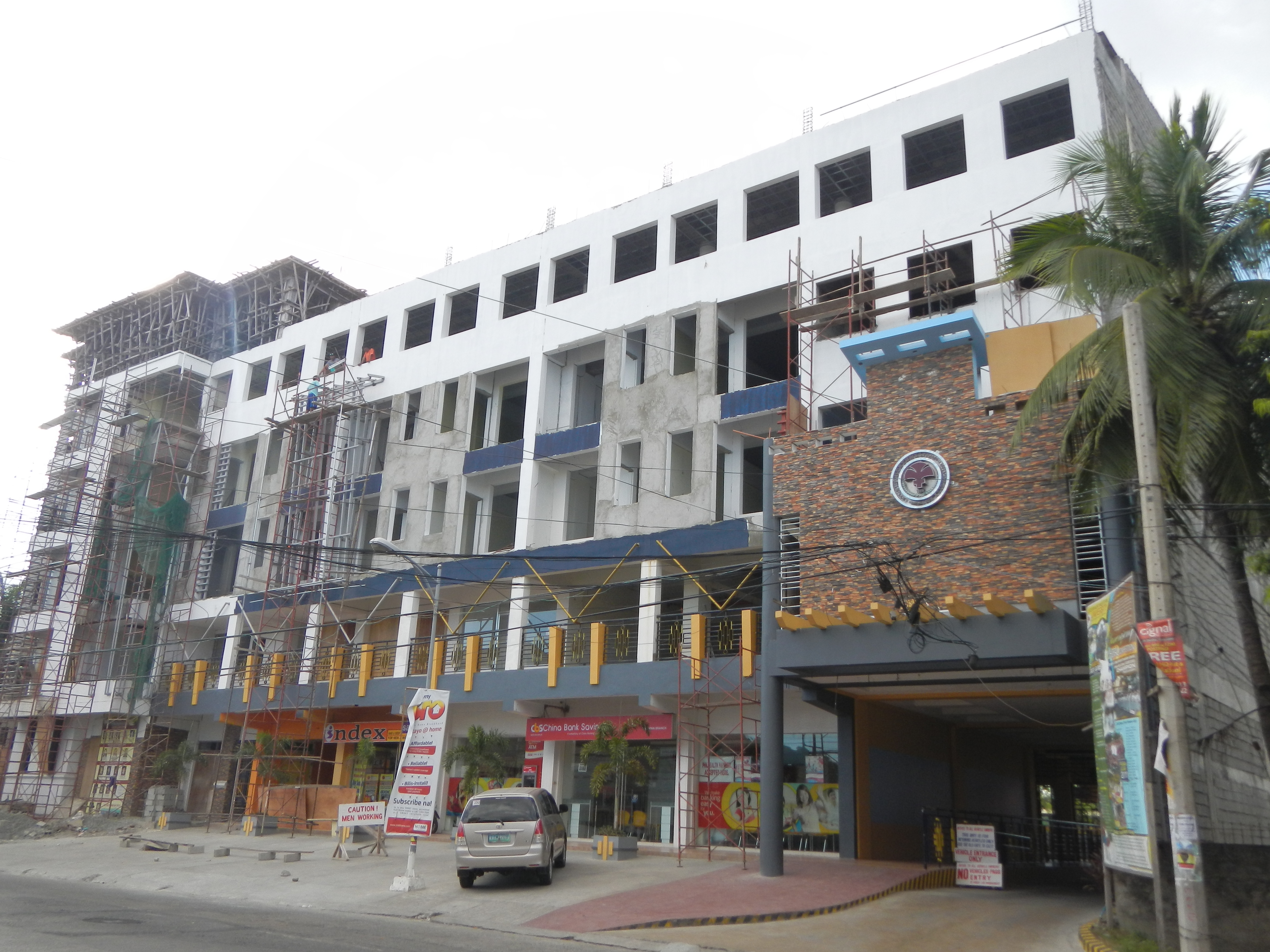
Right

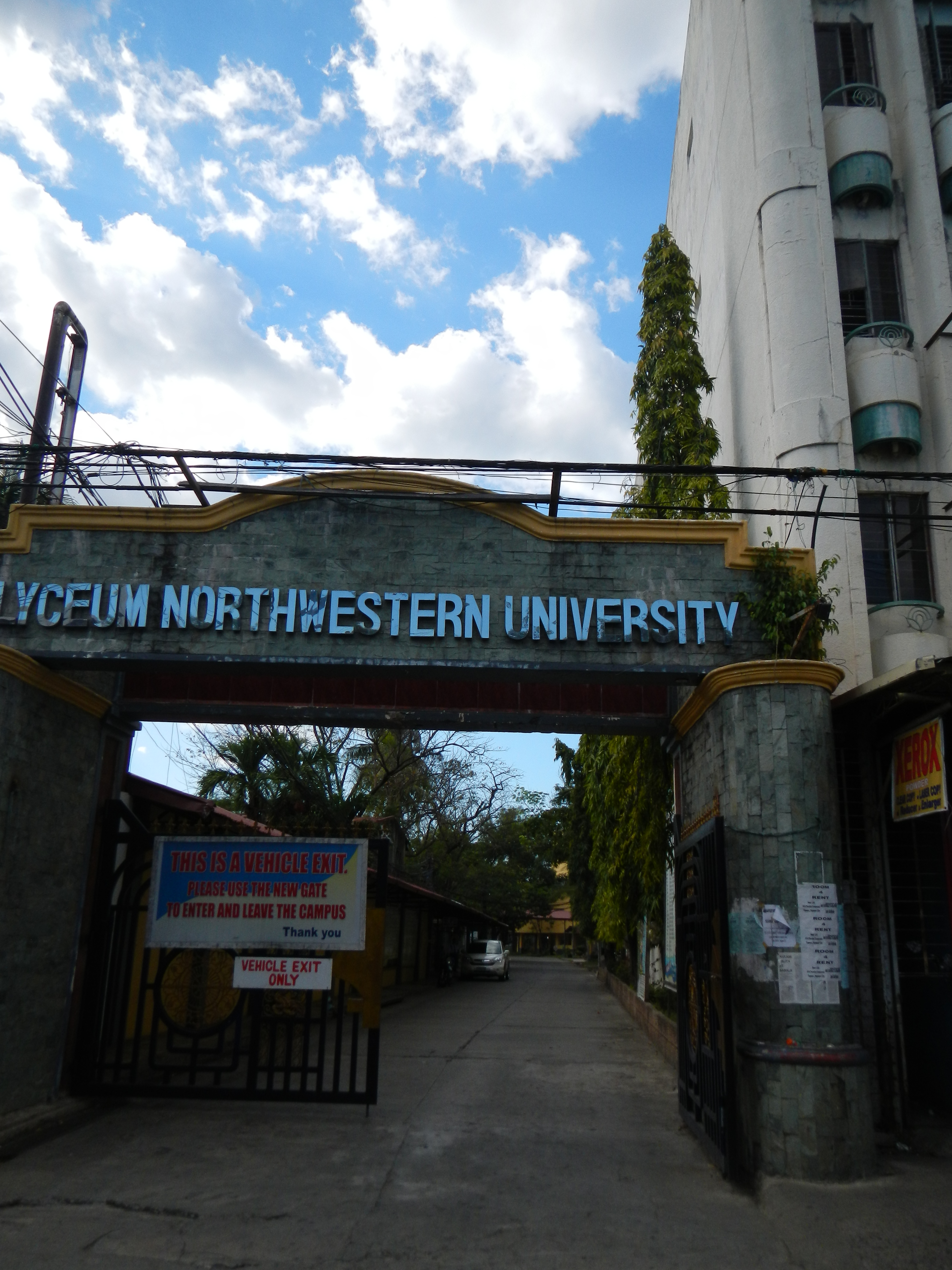
Exit
