= St. John's Cathedral School =

Roman Catholic school in Dagupan, Philippines

Location
- Main campus: Dagupan, Pangasinan; Philippines
- Coordinates: 16°02′32″N 120°20′07″E

Information
- Type: Private, Roman Catholic
- Motto: Spiritus Et Vita (Spirit and Life)
- Established: 1957
- Director: Msgr.Manuel S. Bravo Jr., Archdiocese of Lingayen-Dagupan
- Faculty: 80+
- Enrollment: 1600+
- Campus: Urban
- Colors: Blue & white
- Athletics: DCAA
- Sports: Basketball and 10+ others
- Nickname: Johannines and Blue Eagles
- Affiliation: Archdiocese of Lingayen-Dagupan
- Hymn: SJCS Hymn
- Website: st-john-039-s-cathedral-school.schools.trokis.com

St. John's Cathedral School (Spanish: Escuela de la Catedral de San Juan; also referred to as "St. John's" or simply "SJ") is a Catholic private school teaching run by the Archdiocese of Lingayen-Dagupan in the Philippines. It is one of the oldest Catholic School in Dagupan, tracing its roots to 1957 when the school was founded. It remained a Catholic institution through various generations, offering primary and secondary education.

The Saint John's Cathedral School offers programs in the elementary, and secondary levels. Known for its liberal arts tradition, the humanities are a key feature of Catholic education at primary and secondary levels of study. It also has senior high schools and over 2,000 high schools and over 1,500 elementary students.
