= Dagupan =

Independent component city in Ilocos Region, Philippines

Dagupan City of Dagupan
- Independent component city
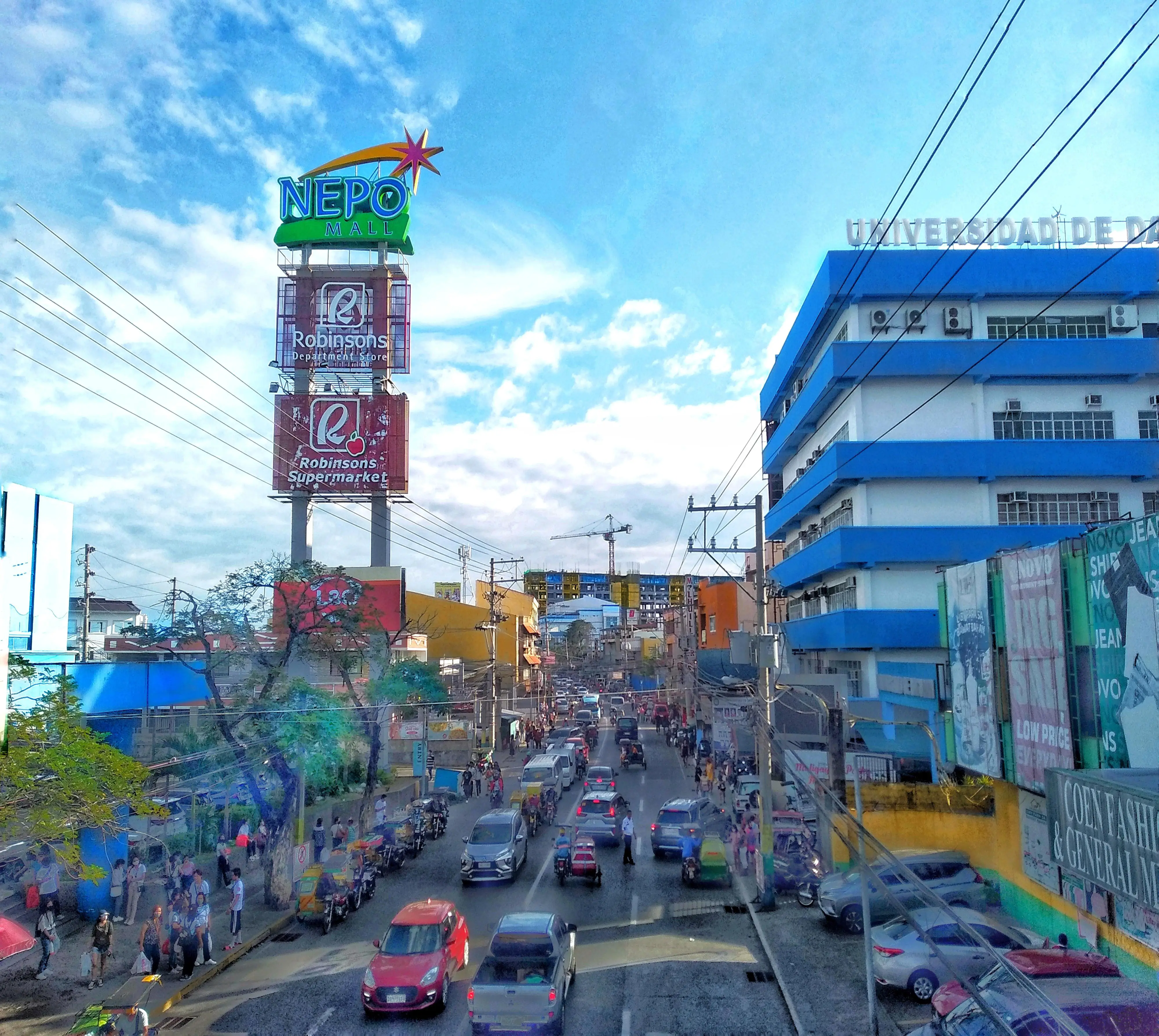
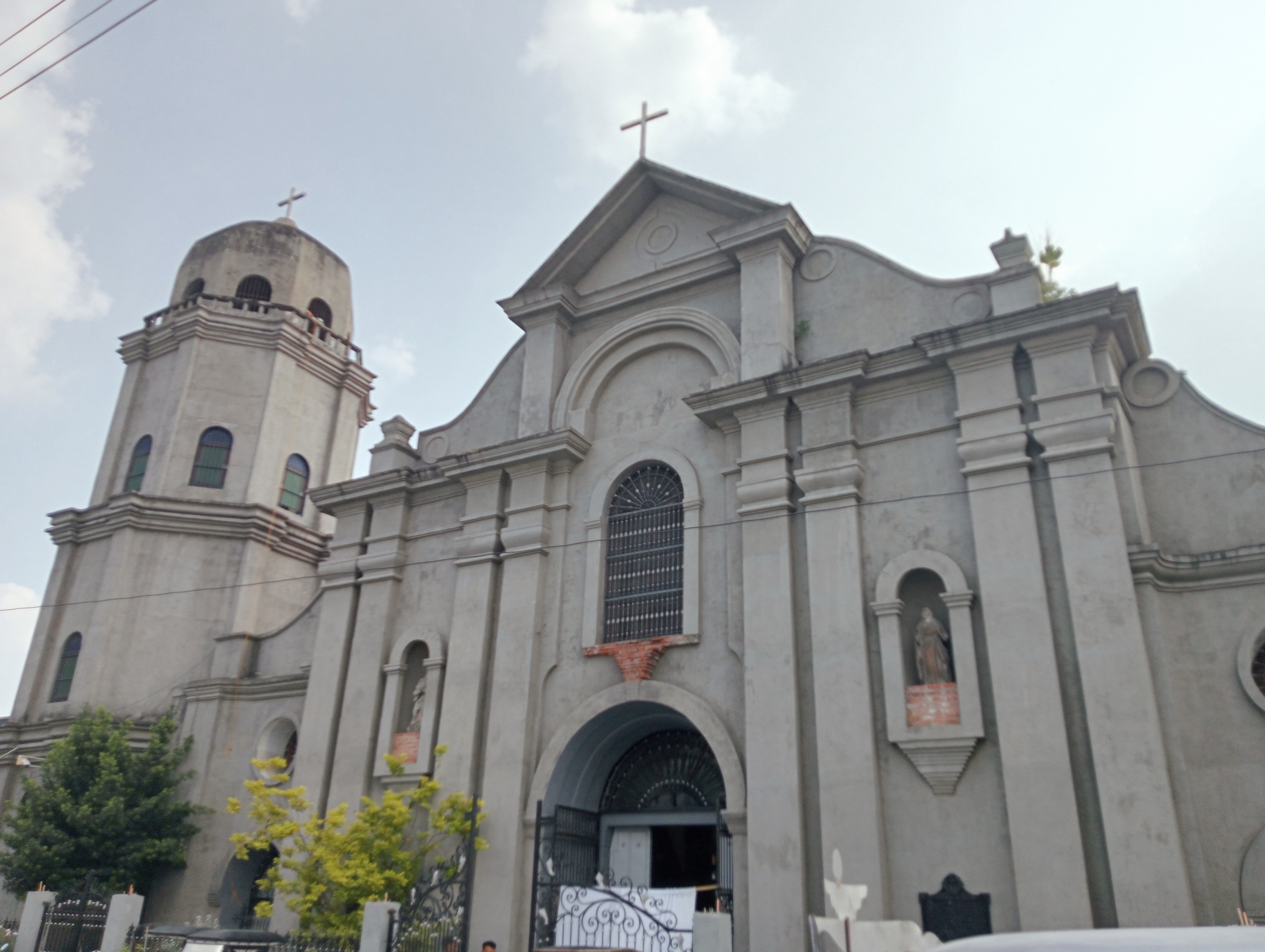
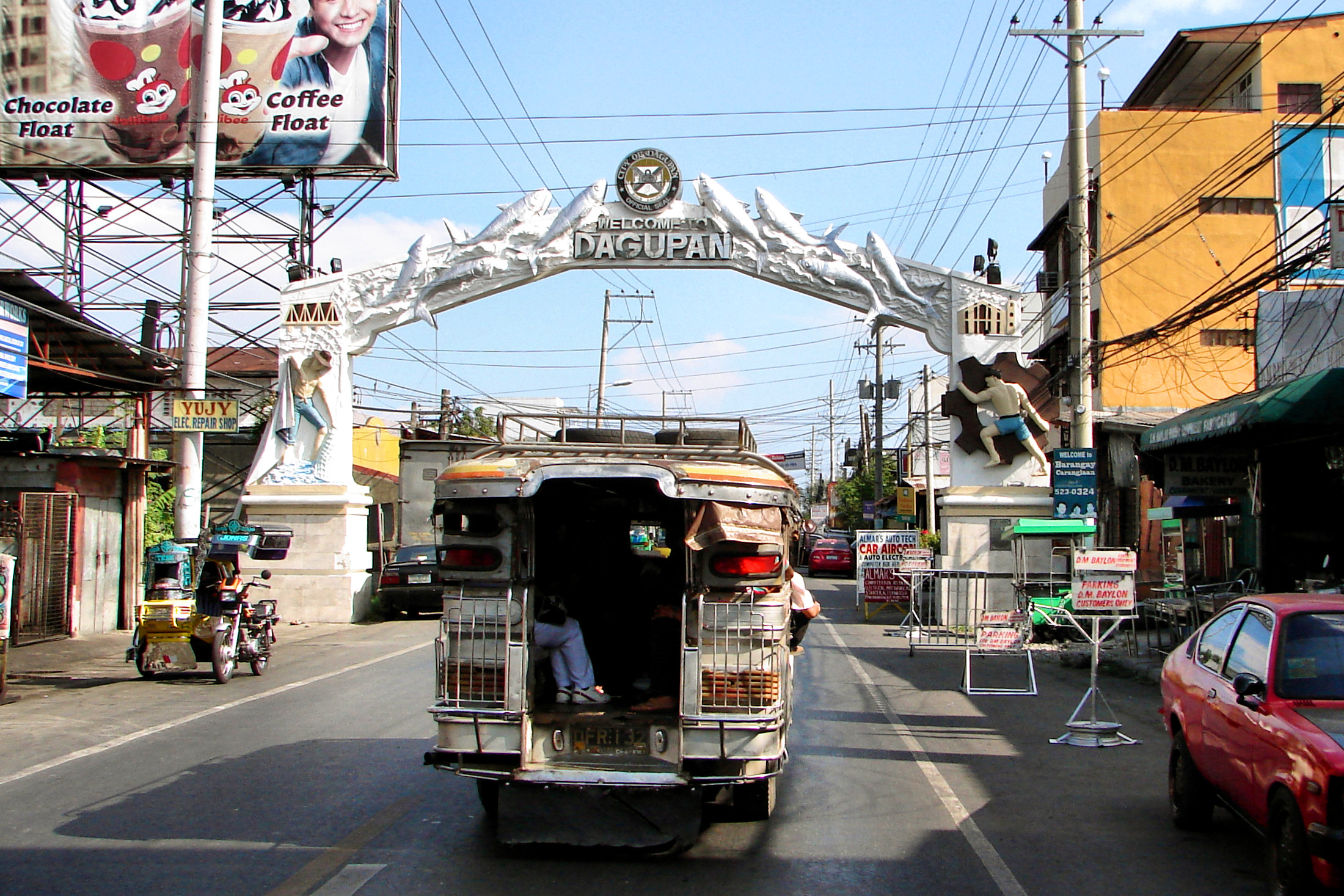
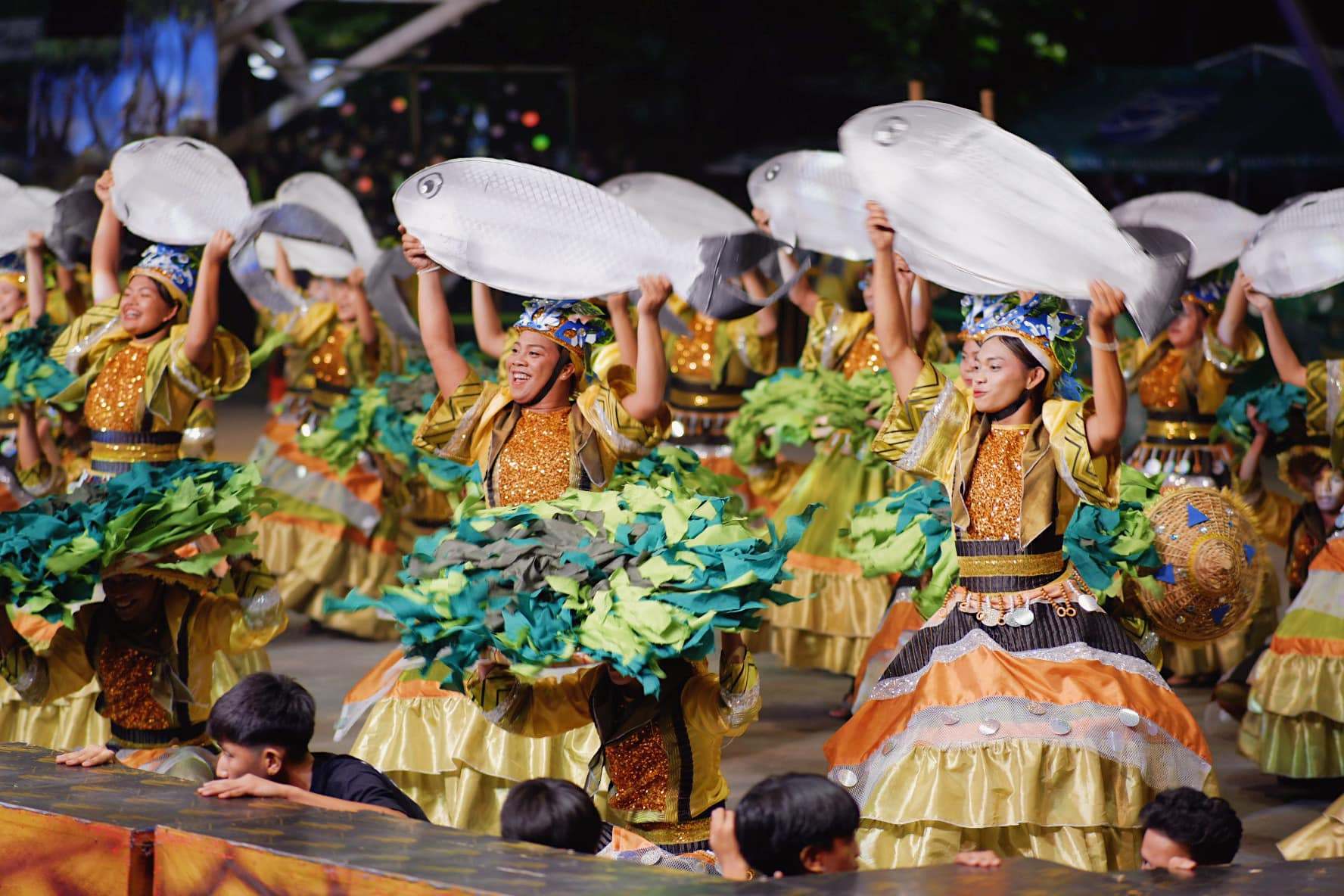
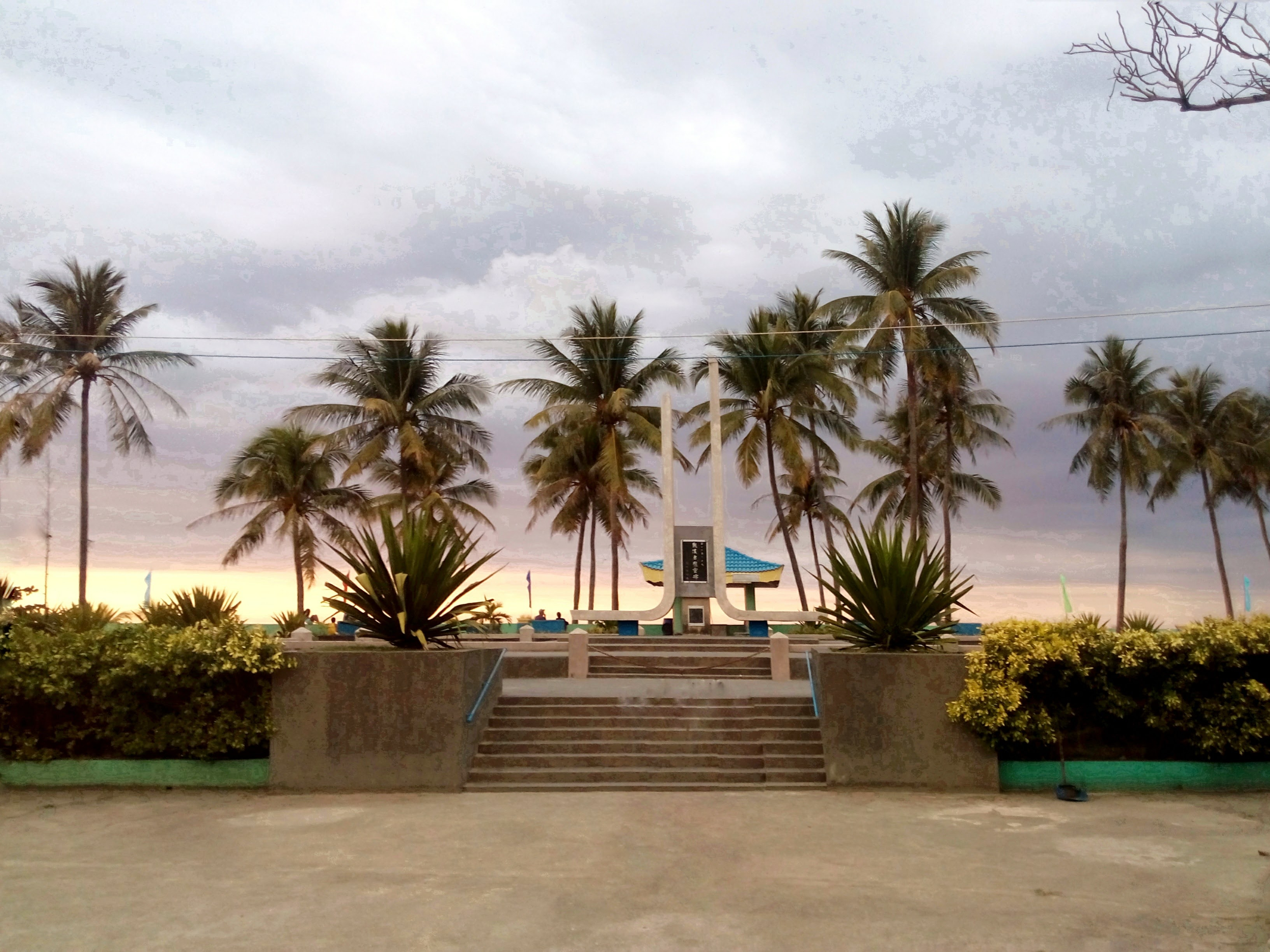
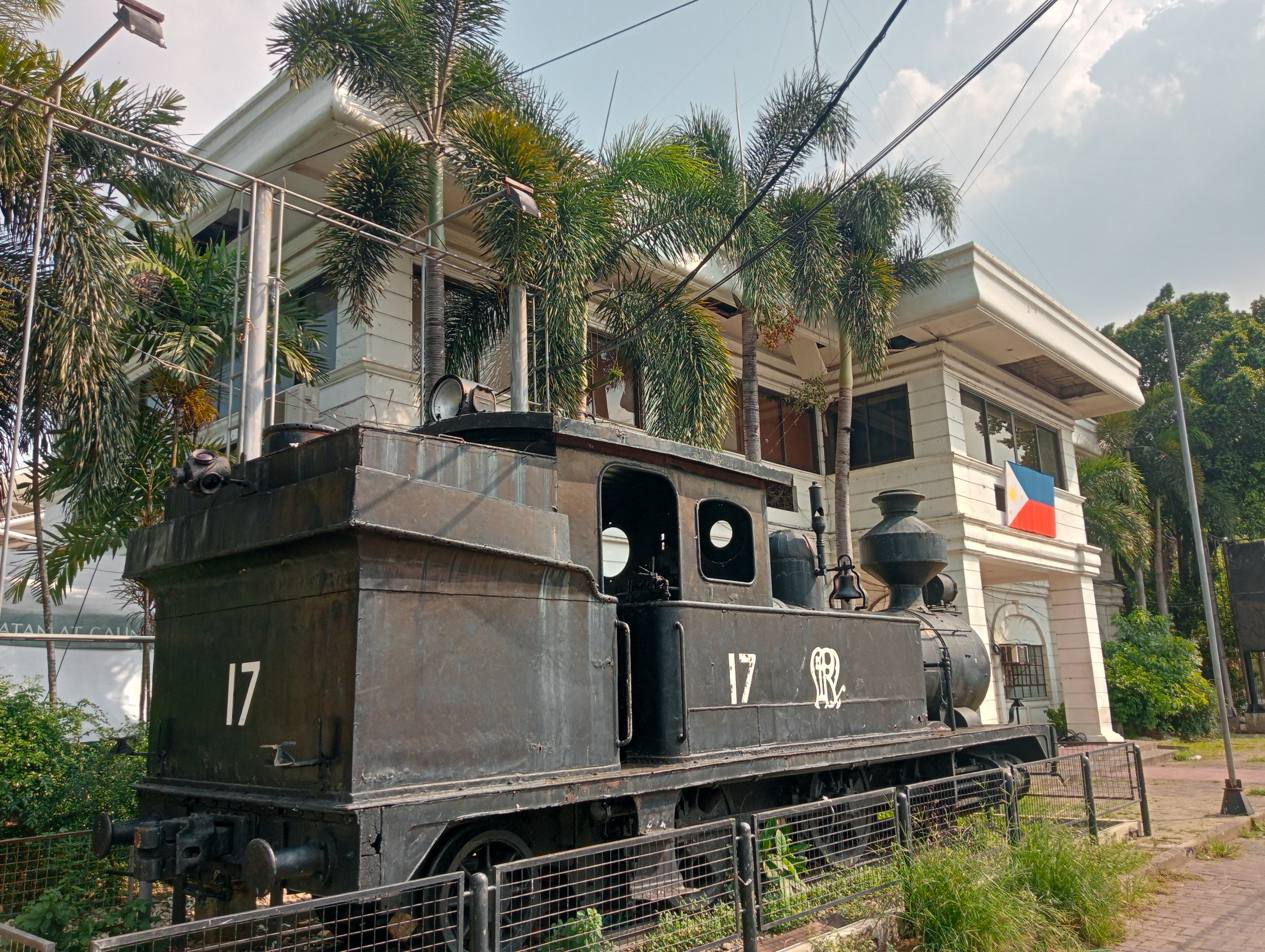
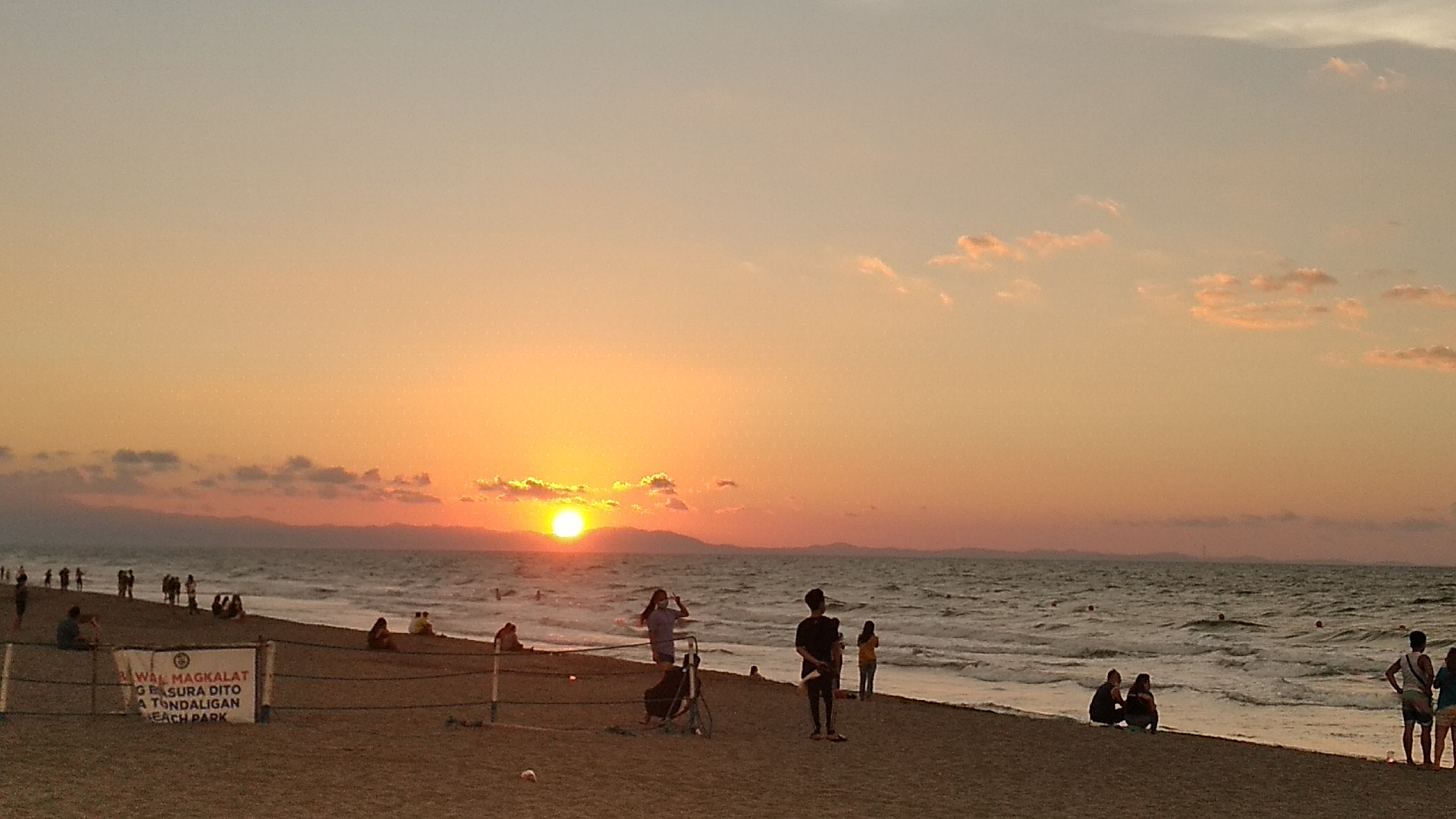
- Clockwise from top: Arellano Street - Downtown Dagupan, Santuario de San Juan Evangelista, Street performers in Bangus Festival, Dagupan City Museum, Tondaligan Beach, Filipino-Japanese Friendship Garden, Millenium Welcome Arch, and the Metropolitan Cathedral of Saint John the Evangelist

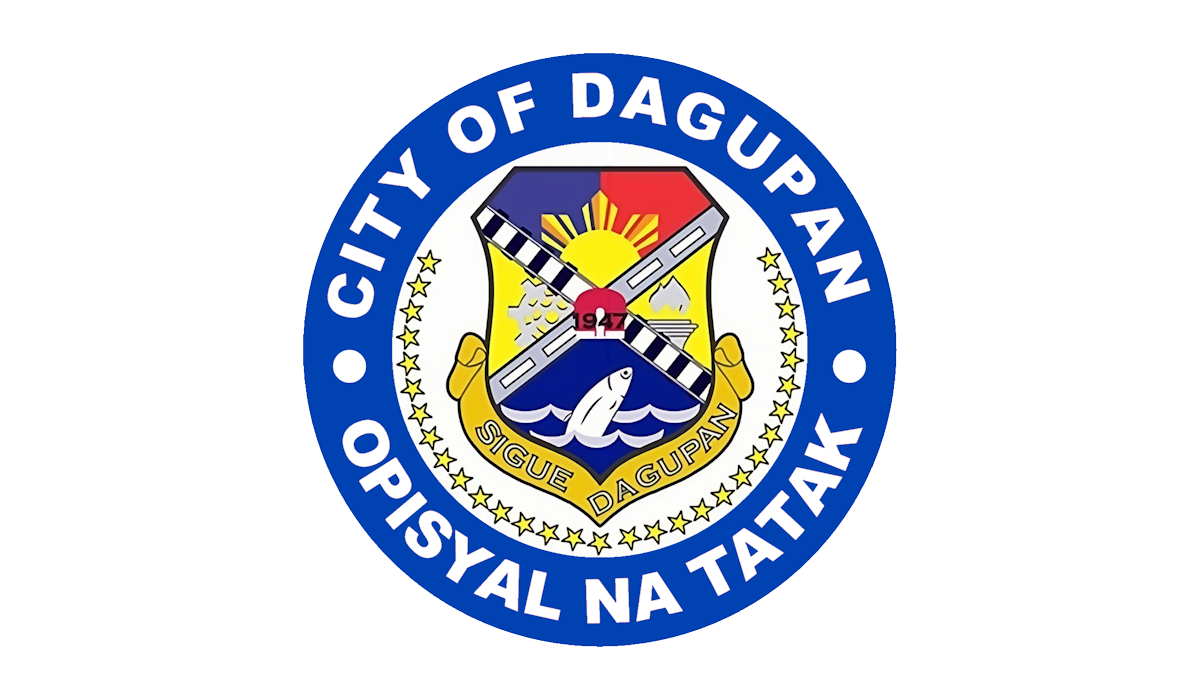
- Flag Seal
- Nicknames: Bangus (Milkfish) Capital of the Philippines; Kitchen of the North
- Anthem: Dagupan Hymn
- Interactive map of Dagupan
- Location within the Philippines
- Coordinates: 16°02′35″N 120°20′02″E
- Country: Philippines
- Region: Ilocos Region
- Province: Pangasinan (geographically only)
- District: 4th district
- Founded: 1590
- Cityhood: June 20, 1947
- Barangays: 31 (see Barangays)

Government
  - Type: Sangguniang Panlungsod
  - Mayor: Belen T. Fernandez (PFP)
  - Vice Mayor: Dean Bryan L. Kua (PFP)
  - Representative: Gina de Venecia (Lakas)
  - City Council: Members: Michael B. Fernandez (PFP); Jose Netu M. Tamayo (PFP); Christel Hilary Paras (PFP); Jeslito C. Seen (PFP); Karlos Liberato E. Reyna IV (PFP); Danielle Francine B. Canto (PFP); Luis M. Samson Jr. (PFP); Marvin V. Fabia (PFP); Jalice D. Cayabyab-Lalas (PFP); Ma. Librada Fe M. Reyna-Macalanda (NP)
  - Electorate: 144,481 voters (2025)

Area
  - Total: 44.47 km^{2} (17.17 sq mi)
- Elevation: 18 m (59 ft)
- Highest elevation: 461 m (1,512 ft)
- Lowest elevation: 0 m (0 ft)

Population (2024 census)
  - Total: 174,777
  - Density: 3,930/km^{2} (10,180/sq mi)
  - Households: 42,017
- Demonym(s): Dagupeño (masculine); Dagupeña (feminine); Dagupenean

Economy
  - Income class: 2nd city income class
  - Poverty incidence: 10.55% (2023)
  - Revenue: ₱ 1,417 million (2024)
  - Assets: ₱ 4,331 million (2024)
  - Expenditure: ₱ 1,206 million (2024)
  - Liabilities: ₱ 901.6 million (2024)

Service provider
  - Electricity: Dagupan Electric Corporation (DECORP)
- Time zone: UTC+8 (PhST)
- ZIP code: 2400
- PSGC: 0105518000
- IDD : area code: +63 (0)75
- Native languages: Pangasinan; Ilocano; Tagalog
- Website: dagupan.gov.ph

Dagupan [dɐˈgupan], officially the City of Dagupan (Pangasinan: Siyudad na Dagupan, Ilocano: Siudad ti Dagupan, Filipino: Lungsod ng Dagupan), is an independent component city in the Ilocos Region of the Philippines. According to the 2024 census, it has a population of 174,777 people.

Located on Lingayen Gulf on the northwest-central part of Luzon, Dagupan is the primary commercial and financial center of Pangasinan. The city is also one of the centers of modern medical services, education, media and communication in North-Central Luzon. The NEDA-Regional Development Council officially recognized Dagupan as a regional center. The city is situated within the fertile Agno River Valley and is in turn a part of the larger Central Luzon plain.

The city is among the top producers of milkfish (locally known as bangus) in the province and also the bangus capital of the country. From 2001 to 2003, Dagupan's milkfish production totaled to 35,560.1 metric tons (34,998.5 long tons; 39,198.3 short tons), contributing 16.8 percent to the total provincial production. Of its total production in the past three years, 78.5 percent grew in fish pens/cages, while the rest grew in brackish water fishponds.

Dagupan is administratively and politically independent from the provincial government of Pangasinan and is only represented by the province's legislative district. It is the second most-populous city in the province and in the Ilocos Region, after San Carlos. It is the only independent city of Ilocos Region.

Dagupan is one of the proposed metropolitan areas in the Philippines. Metro Dagupan is proposed to include the independent component city of Dagupan, as well as the towns of Binmaley, Calasiao, Lingayen, Manaoag, Mangaldan, Mapandan, San Fabian, San Jacinto, and Santa Barbara.

== Etymology ==
The city's name was derived from the local Pangasinan word pandaragupan which means gathering place as the city has been a regional market center for centuries; the root word is dagop, Pangasinan term of gather.

== History ==
=== Pangasinan ===
Prior to the arrival of the Spanish in the 16th century, the polity of Pangasinan was an ancient coastal region composed of various settlements, whose paramount leaders sent emissaries to China in 1406–1411.

=== Spanish Period ===
The area of what is now known as Dagupan was described as a marshland thickly covered with mangrove and nipa palm trees. The natives lived along the shoreline and riverbanks of Calmay, Pantal, and Bonuan; but there were also communities in Malued, Lasip, Pogo, and Bacayao. The natives called the area Bacnotan which would later be incorporated into the encomienda of Lingayen that was established in 1583.

The first long distance railroad in the Philippines connecting Manila and Dagupan was opened on November 24, 1892.

=== Japanese occupation ===
Japanese planes bombed Dagupan in December 1941. Dagupan was occupied by Japanese forces starting in 1942. The city also served as a wartime capital of Pangasinan.

=== Allied liberation ===
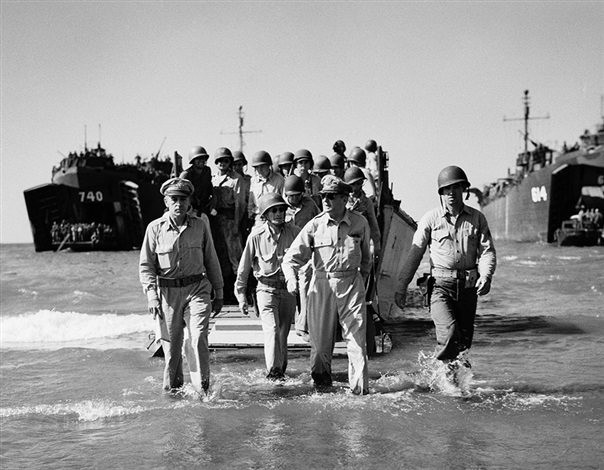
General Douglas MacArthur Landing at Luzon, Philippines, 1945. "Blue Beach", Dagupan

On January 8–9, 1945, U.S. General Douglas MacArthur landed his amphibious liberation force in the city's "Blue Beach" section in Bonuan Gueset along the shores of Lingayen Gulf. From his beachhead in Dagupan, along with those in neighboring towns Lingayen, Binmaley and San Fabian, MacArthur's forces under General Walter Krueger, together with the Philippine Commonwealth units under the Philippine Army and the Philippine Constabulary, penetrated Japanese defenses in Luzon and liberated Filipino and allied prisoners of war near Cabanatuan in the province of Nueva Ecija and in Manila's University of Santo Tomas, among others.

=== Cityhood ===
Dagupan became a city by virtue of Republic Act No. 170, authored by House Speaker Eugenio Pérez. It was signed into law by President Manuel Roxas on June 20, 1947.

=== Contemporary history ===
The westward expansion of the city went as far as Lucao, which was also swampland. Local historian Restituto Basa surmised that the name Lucao may have been derived from the shellfish called lukan that used to abound in the swampy area.

In June 1962, Dagupan was shaken by a series of strong earthquakes which occurred at irregular intervals for about three weeks. The quakes toppled the belfry of the Roman Catholic church. Many people from Calmay, Carael and island barrios evacuated to other towns.

In 1968, the national government agencies opened offices in Dagupan and other key cities across the country. The daytime population increased substantially, causing congestion in the city that began to see the appearance of public utility tricycles and other modes of transportation.

On July 16, 1990, a magnitude 7.7 earthquake struck northern Luzon, causing liquefaction, which made buildings tilt and sink due to their heavy weight and the looseness of the ground, which turned into sediment-rich mud. The Magsaysay Bridge, one of the two bridges especially spanning the Pantal River, collapsed, delaying people from crossing to the other banks and vice versa. Major damage caused businesses to be permanently transferred to the neighbouring towns of Mangaldan and Calasiao, but somehow, Dagupan and its inhabitants managed to recover from the earthquake.

At the turn of the millennium, seeking to promote the thriving milkfish industry that harnessed the city as the milkfish capital of the country, The Bangus Festival was formally launched in 2002 by then-Mayor Benjamin Lim. The city earned the World's Longest Barbecue record from the Guinness World Records in 2003 during the holding of the Kalutan ed Dalan where 10,000 pieces of bangus were grilled on the longest barbecue grill measuring 1,007.56 meters long.

== Geography ==
Dagupan covers a total land area of 4,447.10 hectares (10,989.0 acres), bounded by Lingayen Gulf in the north, San Fabian in the northeast, Mangaldan in the east, Calasiao in the south and Binmaley in the west. Land use is primarily for agriculture with 35.98% of the total land area, fishpond, cropland, residential with 22.88%; others uses are commercial, industrial, institutional, government private, parks and roads.

Dagupan is 14 kilometers (8.7 mi) from Lingayen, the capital of Pangasinan, and 220 kilometers (140 mi) from Manila.

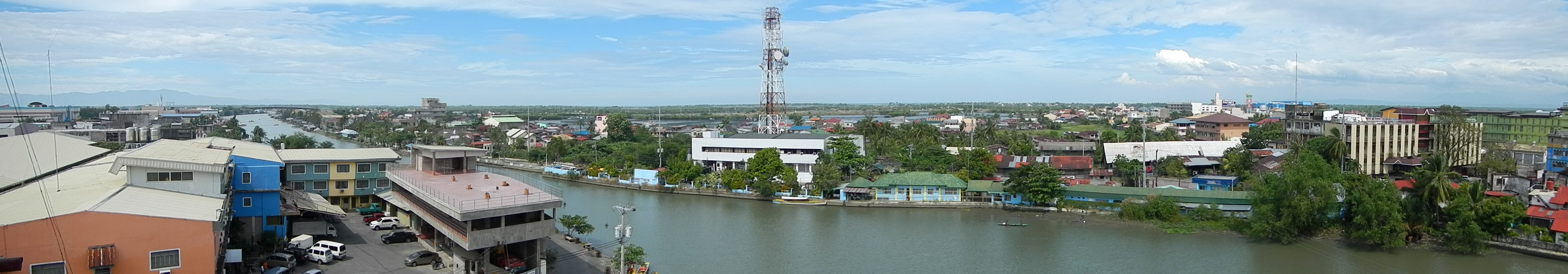
Panoramic view of Dagupan river

=== Baranggay and District ===
Dagupan is politically subdivided into 31 districts. Each district consists of puroks and some have sitios.

| District/Barangay | Population (2025) |
|---|---|
| Bacayao Norte | 4,295 |
| Bacayao Sur | 2,520 |
| Barangay I (T. Bugallon) | 722 |
| Barangay II (Nueva) | 2,300 |
| Barangay IV (Zamora) | 1,199 |
| Bolosan District | 3,320 |
| Bonuan Binloc | 10,674 |
| Bonuan Boquig | 15,351 |
| Bonuan Gueset | 25,390 |
| Calmay District | 5,906 |
| Carael District | 6,490 |
| Caranglaan District | 5,880 |
| Herrero | 1,583 |
| Lasip Chico | 1,208 |
| Lasip Grande | 2,413 |
| Lomboy | 1,300 |
| Lucao District | 10,153 |
| Malued District | 9,265 |
| Mamalingling District | 1,844 |
| Mangin | 4,079 |
| Mayombo District | 9,470 |
| Pantal District | 17,807 |
| Poblacion Oeste | 4,234 |
| Pogo Chico | 4,389 |
| Pogo Grande | 1,990 |
| Pugaro Suit | 5,431 |
| Salapingao | 2,954 |
| Salisay | 2,701 |
| Tambac District | 2,399 |
| Tapuac District | 5,004 |
| Tebeng | 3,031 |

Population distribution (2020)

Total population: 174,302

=== Climate ===
Climate data for Dagupan (1991–2020, extremes 1903–2012)
| Month | Jan | Feb | Mar | Apr | May | Jun | Jul | Aug | Sep | Oct | Nov | Dec | Year |
|---|---|---|---|---|---|---|---|---|---|---|---|---|---|
| Record high °C (°F) | 36.0 (96.8) | 37.0 (98.6) | 38.7 (101.7) | 39.9 (103.8) | 39.6 (103.3) | 38.7 (101.7) | 38.2 (100.8) | 36.4 (97.5) | 36.6 (97.9) | 37.2 (99.0) | 36.9 (98.4) | 36.9 (98.4) | 39.9 (103.8) |
| Mean daily maximum °C (°F) | 30.7 (87.3) | 31.5 (88.7) | 32.9 (91.2) | 34.4 (93.9) | 34.0 (93.2) | 33.3 (91.9) | 31.9 (89.4) | 31.1 (88.0) | 31.5 (88.7) | 31.9 (89.4) | 31.8 (89.2) | 31.0 (87.8) | 32.2 (90.0) |
| Daily mean °C (°F) | 25.9 (78.6) | 26.4 (79.5) | 27.8 (82.0) | 29.5 (85.1) | 29.5 (85.1) | 29.0 (84.2) | 28.1 (82.6) | 27.7 (81.9) | 27.9 (82.2) | 28.0 (82.4) | 27.6 (81.7) | 26.6 (79.9) | 27.8 (82.0) |
| Mean daily minimum °C (°F) | 21.0 (69.8) | 21.4 (70.5) | 22.8 (73.0) | 24.5 (76.1) | 25.0 (77.0) | 24.8 (76.6) | 24.4 (75.9) | 24.4 (75.9) | 24.3 (75.7) | 24.2 (75.6) | 23.4 (74.1) | 22.2 (72.0) | 23.5 (74.3) |
| Record low °C (°F) | 14.3 (57.7) | 16.3 (61.3) | 16.7 (62.1) | 19.7 (67.5) | 19.0 (66.2) | 20.2 (68.4) | 20.4 (68.7) | 19.0 (66.2) | 20.5 (68.9) | 19.5 (67.1) | 17.2 (63.0) | 15.2 (59.4) | 14.3 (57.7) |
| Average rainfall mm (inches) | 5.7 (0.22) | 9.5 (0.37) | 23.0 (0.91) | 69.5 (2.74) | 218.2 (8.59) | 335.5 (13.21) | 532.7 (20.97) | 619.5 (24.39) | 401.6 (15.81) | 226.6 (8.92) | 54.9 (2.16) | 20.0 (0.79) | 2,516.7 (99.08) |
| Average rainy days (≥ 1.0 mm) | 2 | 2 | 3 | 4 | 11 | 16 | 20 | 21 | 19 | 9 | 5 | 3 | 115 |
| Average relative humidity (%) | 81 | 81 | 79 | 79 | 81 | 84 | 87 | 88 | 87 | 85 | 83 | 82 | 83 |
Source: PAGASA

Dagupan has a tropical monsoon climate (Köppen climate classification: Am). It is in Type I climate zone in the Modified Coronas' Climate Classification, with a pronounced dry season from November to April.

== Demographics ==
Population census of Dagupan

| Year | Pop. | ±% p.a. |
|---|---|---|
| 1903 | 20,357 | — |
| 1918 | 22,441 | +0.65% |
| 1939 | 32,602 | +1.79% |
| 1948 | 43,838 | +3.35% |
| 1960 | 63,191 | +3.09% |
| 1970 | 83,582 | +2.83% |

| Year | Pop. | ±% p.a. |
|---|---|---|
| 1975 | 90,092 | +1.52% |
| 1980 | 98,344 | +1.77% |
| 1990 | 122,247 | +2.20% |
| 1995 | 126,214 | +0.60% |
| 2000 | 130,328 | +0.69% |
| 2007 | 149,554 | +1.92% |

| Year | Pop. | ±% p.a. |
|---|---|---|
| 2010 | 163,676 | +3.34% |
| 2015 | 171,271 | +0.87% |
| 2020 | 174,302 | +0.37% |
| 2024 | 174,777 | +0.07% |

Source: Philippine Statistics Authority

In Dagupan, the Pangasinans are the predominant people and a minority of residents are dominantly Ilocanos.

Number of Registered Voters (2025): 144,481

=== Languages ===
Pangasinan is predominantly used in the city and environs, followed by Tagalog and English, as well as Ilocano, mainly in Calmay and Pantal. As Dagupan is the main financial center of Pangasinan and the center of education, media and communication in North Central Luzon, Tagalog or Filipino is mostly spoken by native Pangasinan-speaking residents as the second language, but because Dagupan is politically part of Ilocos Region aside from being the main financial center of Pangasinan, native Pangasinan-speaking residents learning & speaking Ilocano as 2nd language increased a little; the majority of native Pangasinan-speaking residents speaking Ilocano as 2nd language mostly grew up with Ilocano neighbors.

Chinese is mainly spoken only by a few city individuals of Chinese descent.

== Economy ==
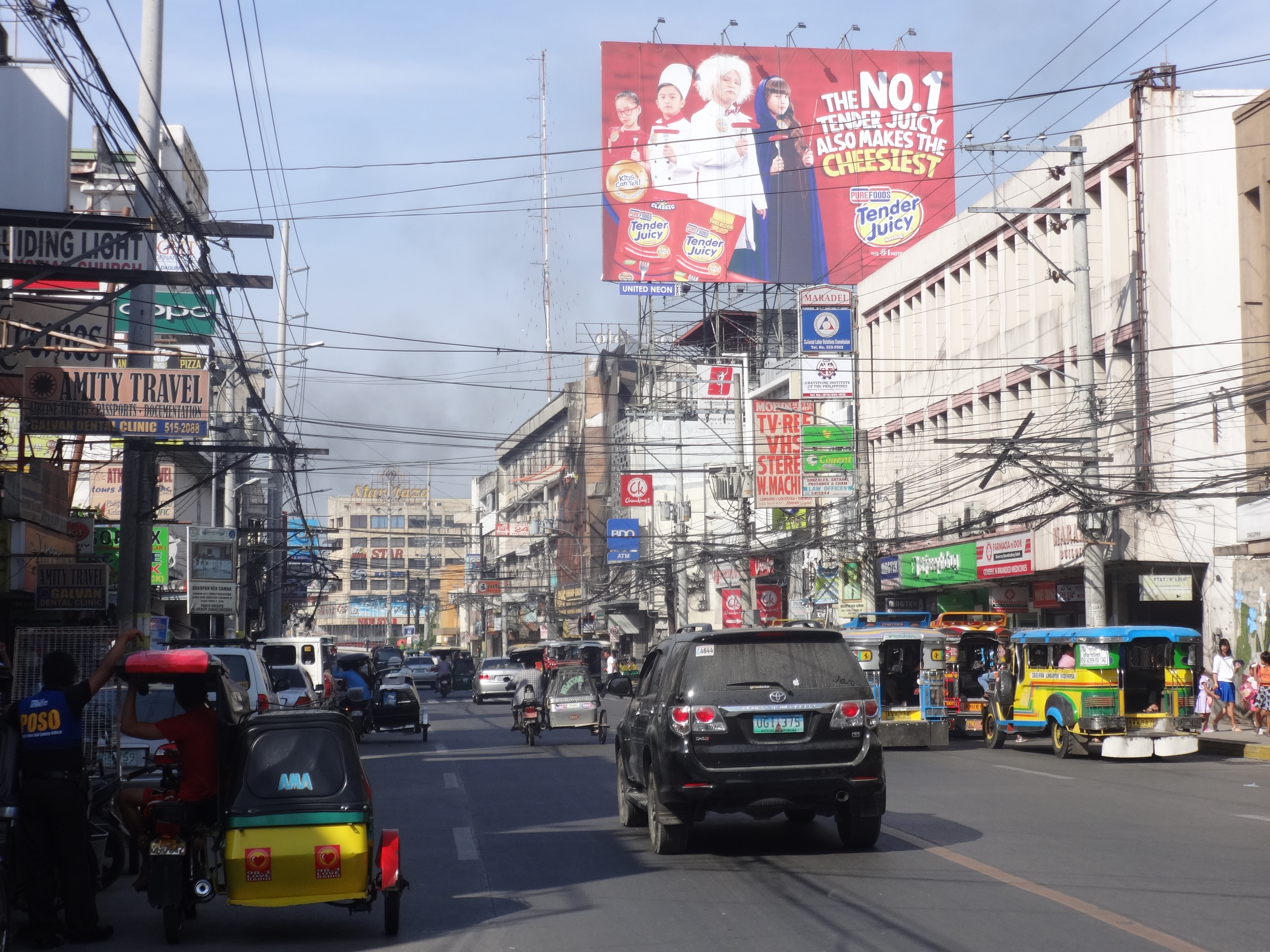
A.B. Fernandez Avenue

Poverty incidence of Dagupan (%)

Source: Philippine Statistics Authority

Dagupan is the economic center of Pangasinan. As a major regional hub, many people in Pangasinan and nearby provinces commute to the city during the day; this causes the city's daytime population to rise and cause traffic in parts of the city, especially the downtown area. The city is a vital financial center housing numerous banks, non-bank financial institutions, headquarters of corporations and offices of major government departments and agencies.

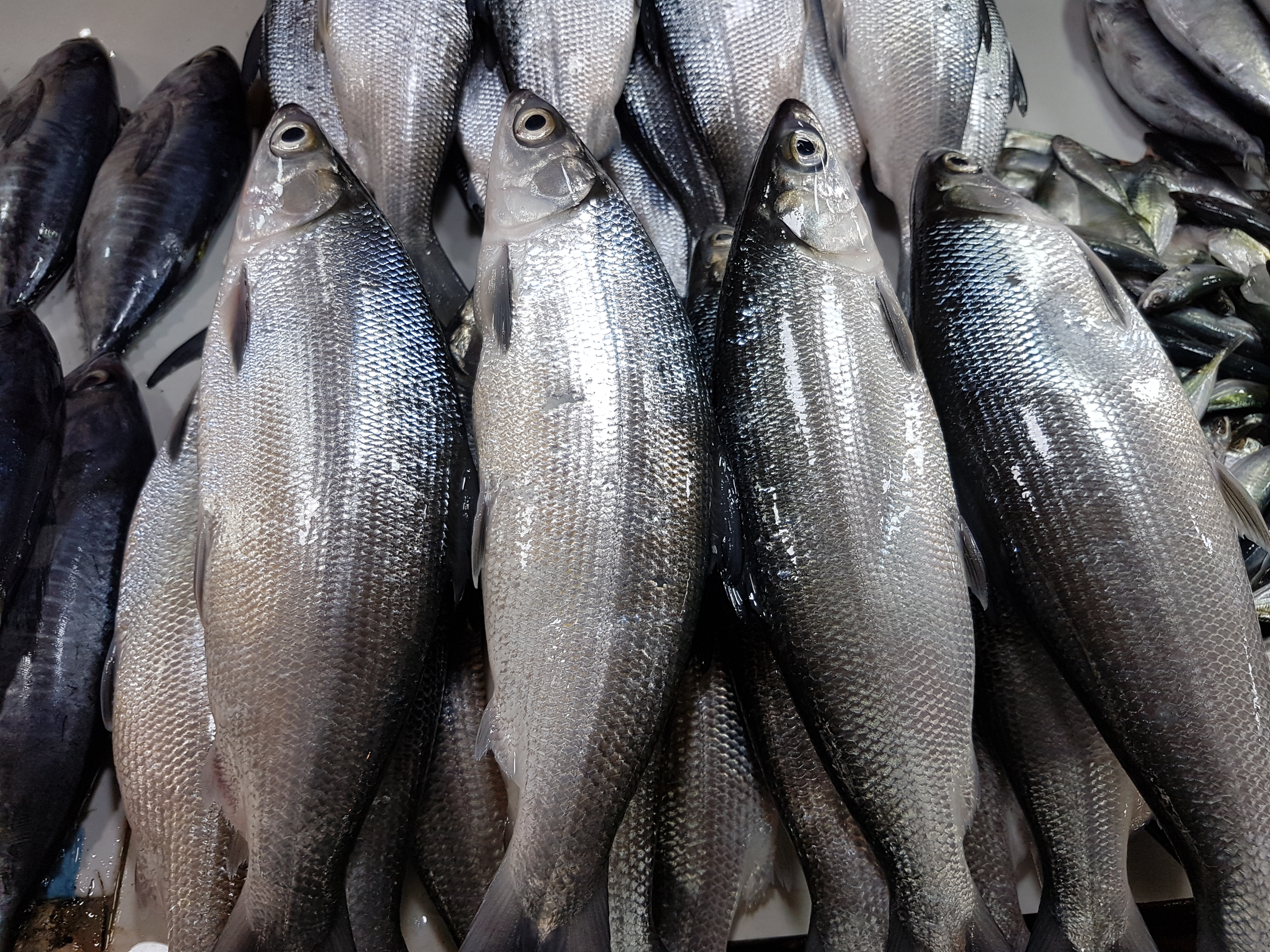
Milkfish, locally known as bangus

Historically, Dagupan was a center for salt making in numerous salt evaporator beds in the low-lying swampy areas close to Lingayen Gulf. Beginning in the 19th century, some of the salt making operations gave way to pond culture of fish, most prominently, the milkfish (locally known as bangus), for which the city has become famous. Fisheries, aquaculture and processed fisheries products are an important mainstay of the city's economy.

SM Center Dagupan along MH Del Pilar and Herrero Perez Streets

Manila-based developers have set up shop in Dagupan due to its strategic location and growing population. These include Santa Lucia Land Inc. (Almeria Verde Subdivision), SM Prime Holdings, and Filinvest.

As of June 2020, Dagupan is one of the 25 cities in the Philippines identified as an area with "high-potential in IT-BPM industry" for transformation into "digital cities" by 2025. Sitel, a global business process outsourcing (BPO) firm, has opened in 2020 its first Sitel MAXhub in Dagupan.

The motor vehicle industry of Dagupan is centered around Caranglaan and Lucao districts. Many well-known automotive companies have a dealership in the city's metropolitan area.

== Tourism ==
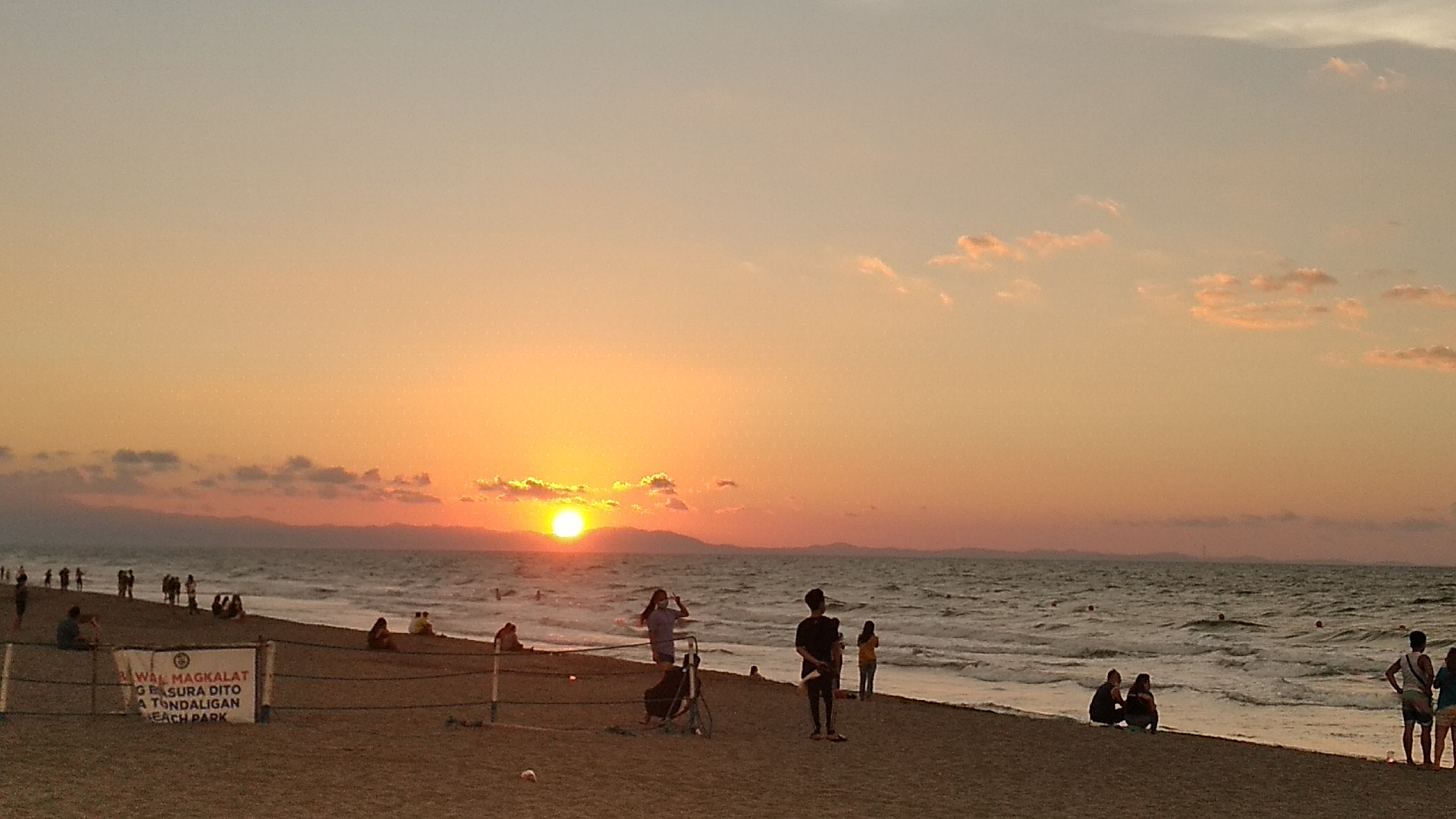
Tondaligan Beach sunset

Dagupan is a historic city that boasts numerous historical, cultural heritage, recreational, ecotourism, business, and culinary tourism of national importance.

Dagupan has been a center of trade in the north for centuries, and its rivers and sandy beaches support several types of tourism. As the transportation hub of Pangasinan, the city is accessible from both within and outside the province.

=== Historical & Heritage Tourism ===
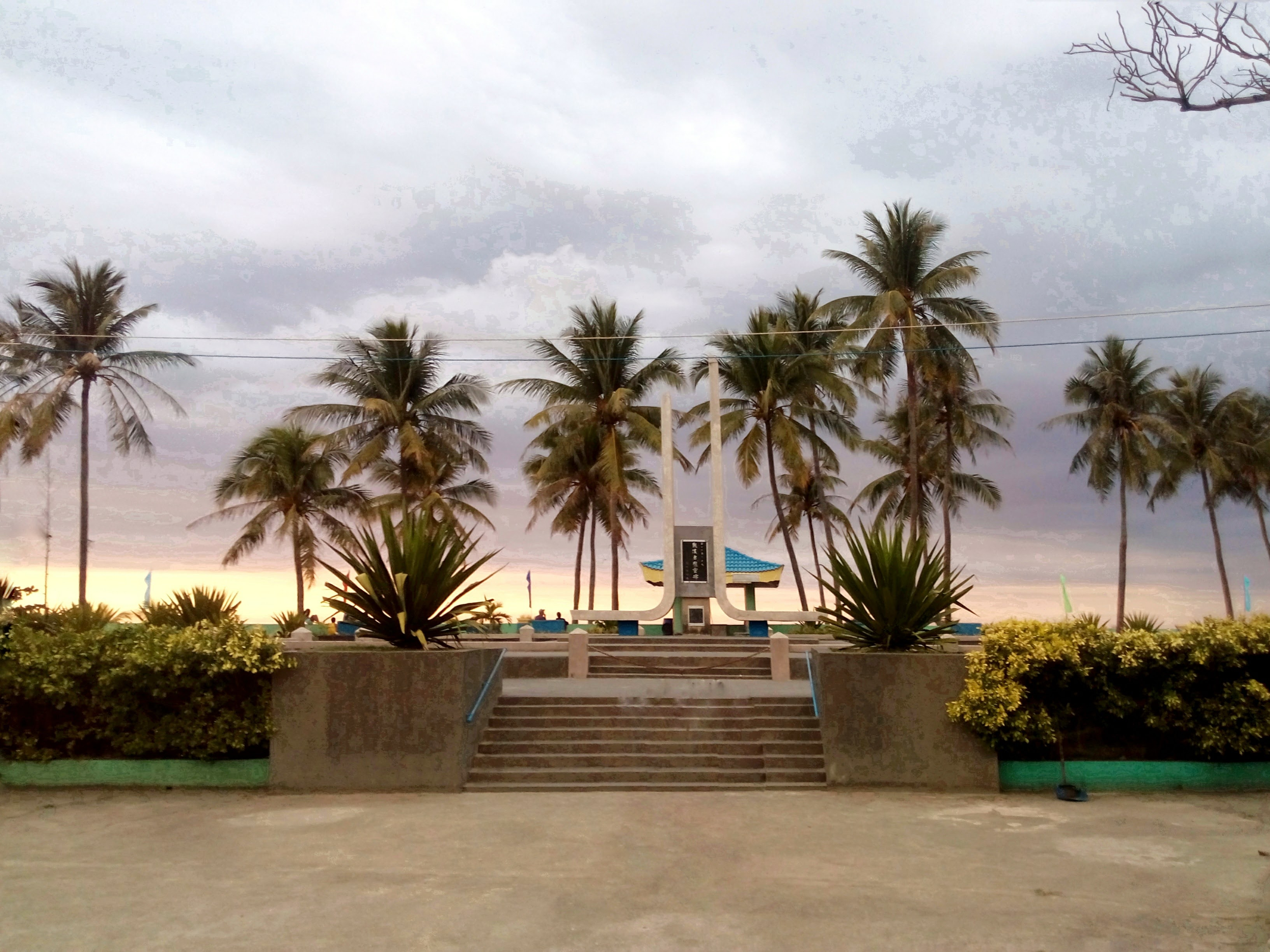
Filipino-Japanese Friendship Garden overlooking historic Lingayen Gulf

Since the Spanish colonial times, the colonial government had put a great emphasis on the importance of the city due to being at the strategic center of the province and its accessibility to the sea for trading and transport. The first Philippine railroad system, the Manila-Dagupan railway, had its terminus in the city. Remnant of the historic rail transport locomotive can be seen displayed in front of the city museum.

During World War 2, Dagupan also served as the wartime capital of Pangasinan. The shores of Bonuan Gueset was a silent witness to the historic landing of Gen. MacArthur that eventually became one of the key historic points in the country's liberation. To immortalize this important feat in the city's history, a MacArthur Landing Park was built to stand by the shore of Tondaligan Beach, adjacent to Filipino-Japanese Peace Park.

More structures and landmarks of historic importance still dot the city, some of which are already listed as heritage sites by the National Historical Commission of the Philippines (NHCP). These include:
• Home Economics/Gabaldon Building at West Central Elementary School
• Old City Hall and Water Tower
• Metropolitan Cathedral of Saint John
• Philippine National Railways Tracks and Station
• Remnants of Franklin Bridge
• Lighthouse in Bonuan

=== Food Tourism ===
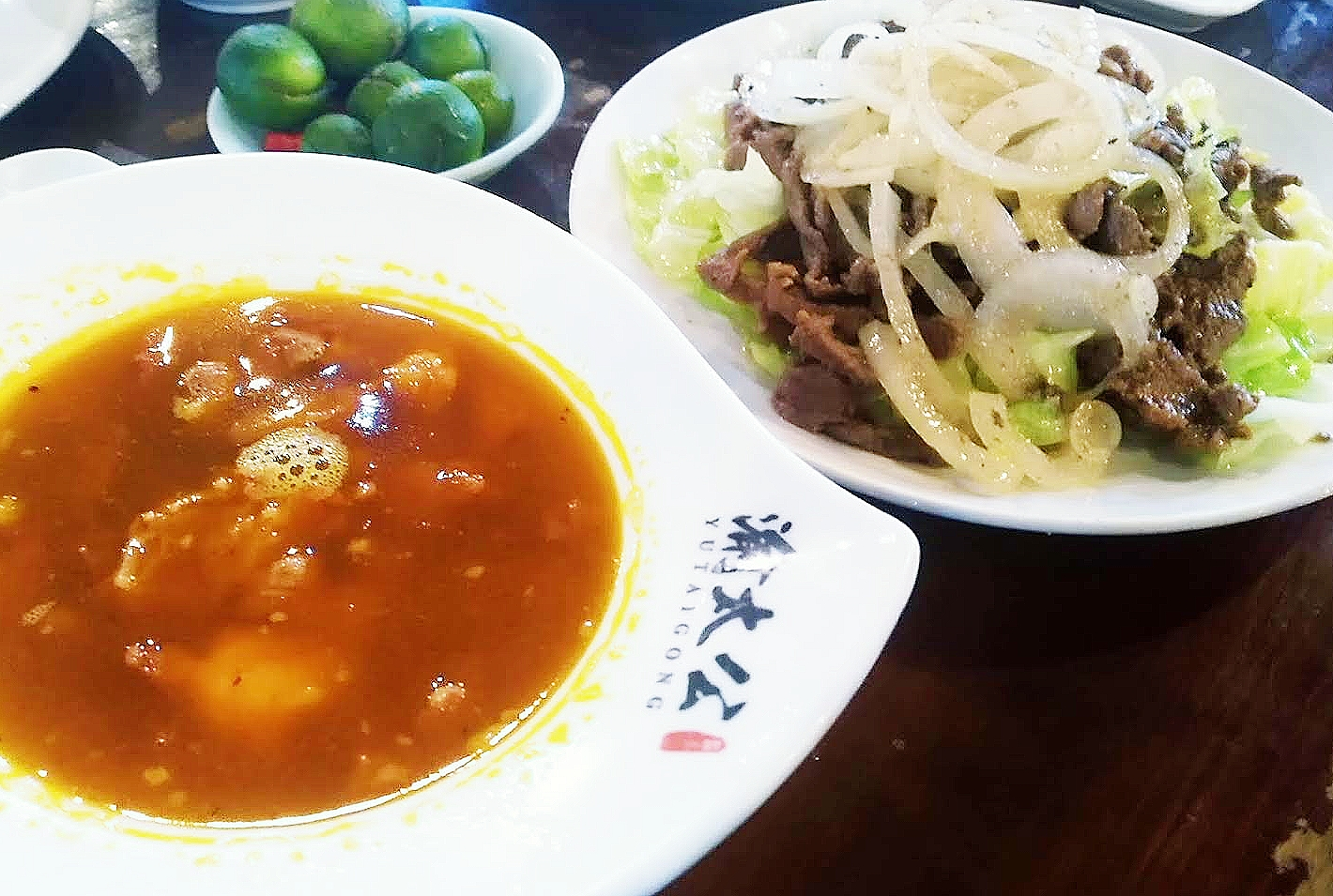
Aside from Bangus, Dagupan is well known for its Pigar-Pigar (right) and Kaleskes (left)

Aside from being the Bangus Capital of the Philippines, the city is also known as the Kitchen of the North. Many popular culinary traditions have originated in the city, including Pigar-Pigar, Kaleskes, and Bonuan Boneless Bangus. Plato Wraps, a contemporary food innovation that's now popularly sold in major shopping malls also hails from the city.

Dagupan is home to popular homegrown restaurants that branched out in many parts of Luzon.

Food Hubs:
• Metro Plaza (International and national food and resto chains)
• Galvan Street (The center for local Dagupan cuisines such as Pigar-Pigar, Kaleskes and other native dishes)
• Tondaligan Food Hub (Alfresco dining by the beach hosting native delicacies, street foods and selected food kiosks)
• Dagupan City Growth Center-Lucao (A modern lifestyle center and food hub by the river hosting popular restaurants & cafes)
• Plaza Del Carmen (Hosts traditional and innovative cafes, bars and restaurants)
• Royal Rays Food Hub (A hub for Filipino and Asian dining)

=== Ecotourism ===
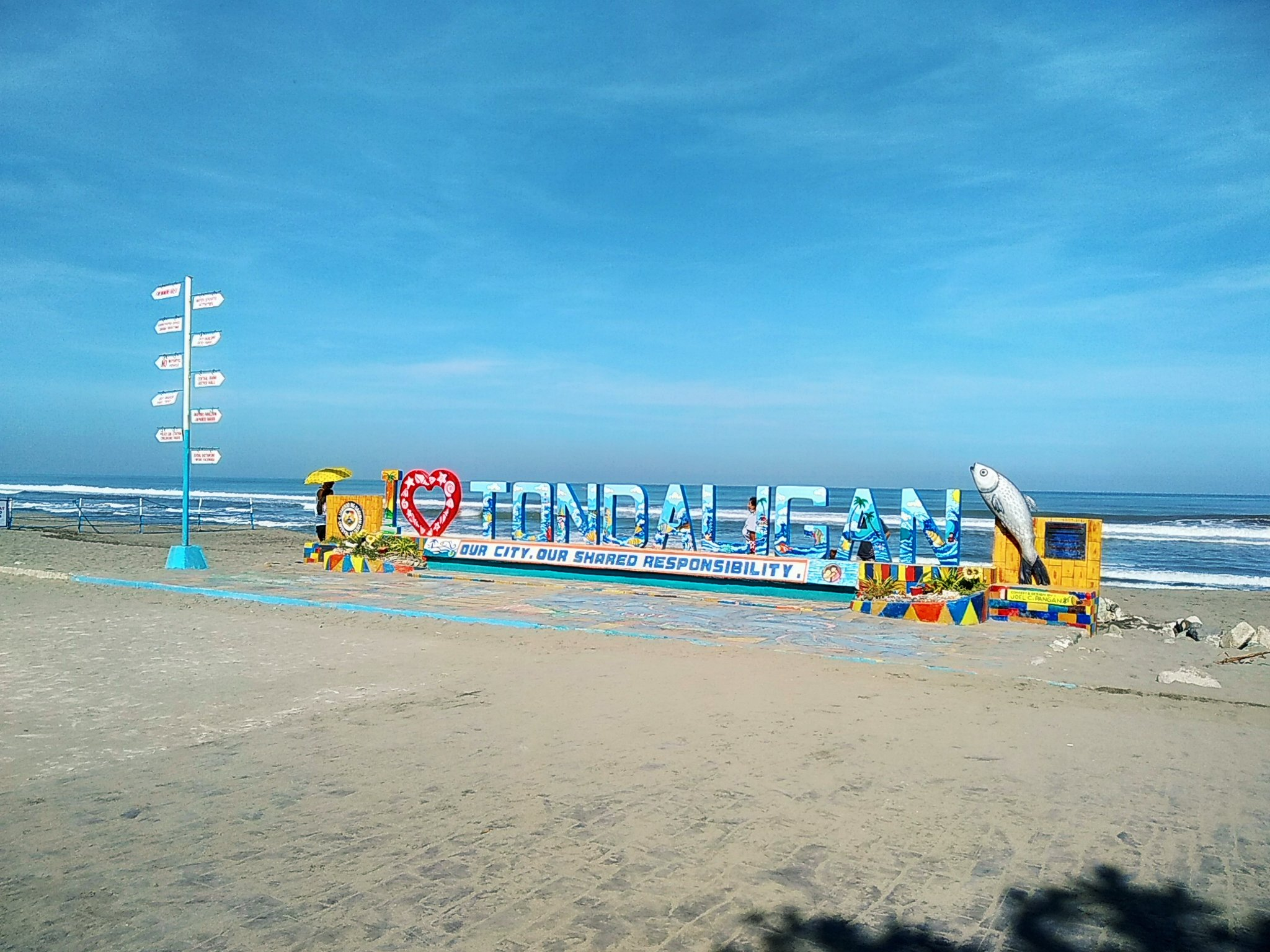
A welcoming beach landmark along the baywalk of Tondaligan

Dagupan, being surrounded by rivers and sea, offers extensive ecotourism activities for recreation, relaxation and adventure.

Tondaligan Beach is an urban beach park complex with numerous amenities. The extensive Tondaligan baywalk, dubbed as the longest in the region, is a prominent feature along the Bonuan shore wherein cyclists can enjoy biking and savor Lingayen Gulf's picturesque view.

Tondaligan Beach Park also hosts many historical landmark of national importance such as:

- Gen. MacArthur Landing Park
- Filipino-Japanese Friendship Garden
- Tondaligan Grand Amphitheater

Other interesting spots and landmarks in the city that can be visited are as follows:

- Dawel River Cruise
- BFAR – NIFTDC
- Pugaro Beach
- Bonuan Golf Course
- Leisure Coast Resort

=== Festivities ===
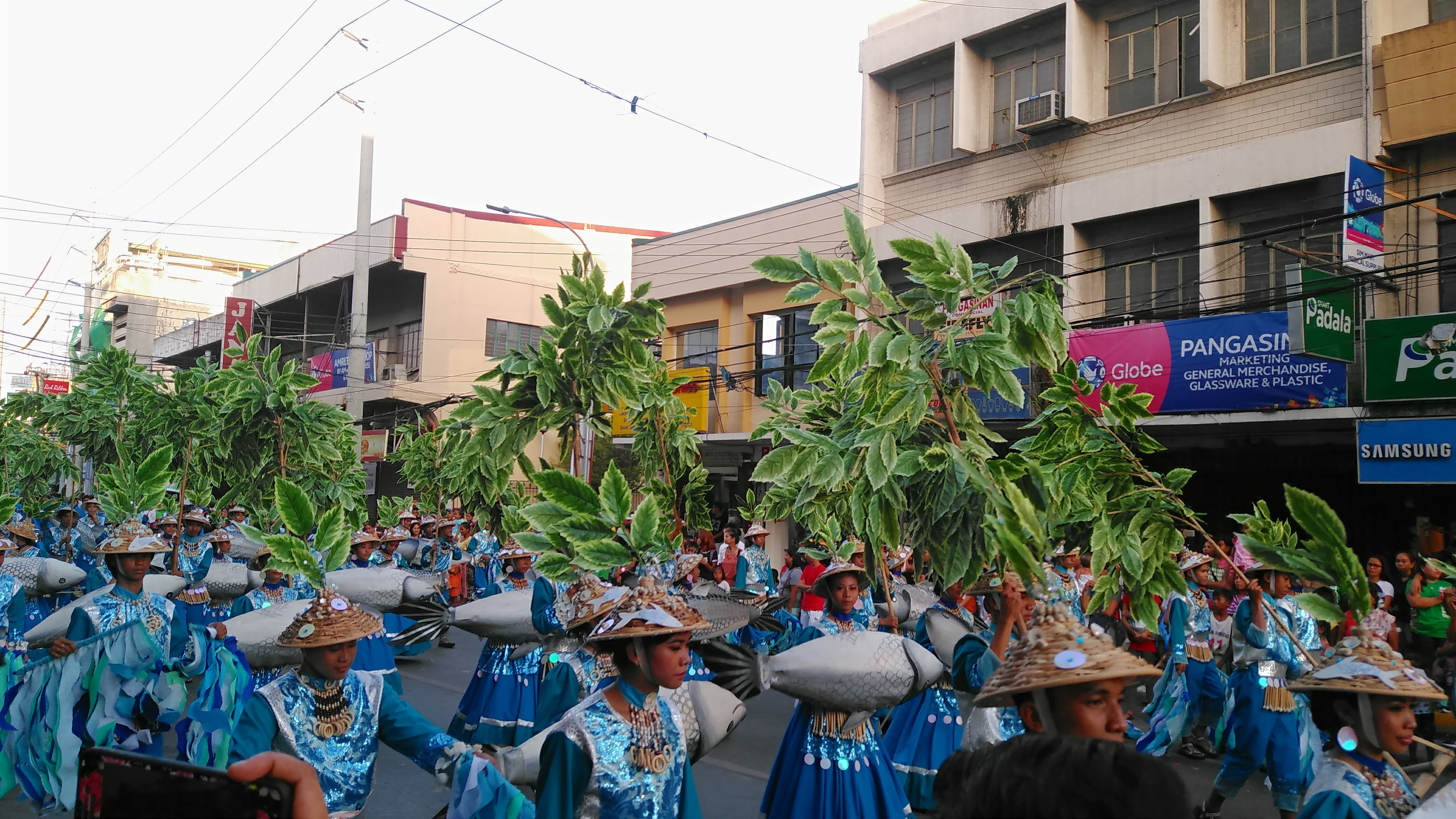
Bangus Festival – Gilon Gilon ed Baley Street Dance Competition

As the Bangus (Milkfish) Capital of the Philippines, Dagupan has been celebrating its produce through the Bangus Festival, which started in 2002. It is a yearly month-long celebration in the month of April.

The festival features the famous bangusine (bangus cuisine) which is one of the main highlights of the event, street dancing where competing barangays parade in the city's main avenue wearing colorful Bangus Festival costumes, bangus grilling, deboning, variety shows, trade fairs, beauty pageants, sports fest, cooking show, medical mission, visual arts, band concerts, sports activities, dog show, fluvial parade, drum and lyre parade, and street party. The festival concludes every April 30 with main events: Kalutan ed Dalan in the daytime and Bangusan Street Party concerts in the nighttime.

Pista'y Dayat (Festival of the Sea) is held the day after the conclusion of Bangus Festival. It is a simultaneously celebrated festivity together with the neighboring towns in the Lingayen Gulf area. It serves as a thanksgiving for the bountiful harvest and abundant fishing from the sea in the province of Pangasinan.

Dagupan City Fiesta is a month-long celebration held every December with a Catholic fiesta mass and Procession at St. John Cathedral in honor of St. John the Evangelist, the patron saint of Dagupan and of fishermen.

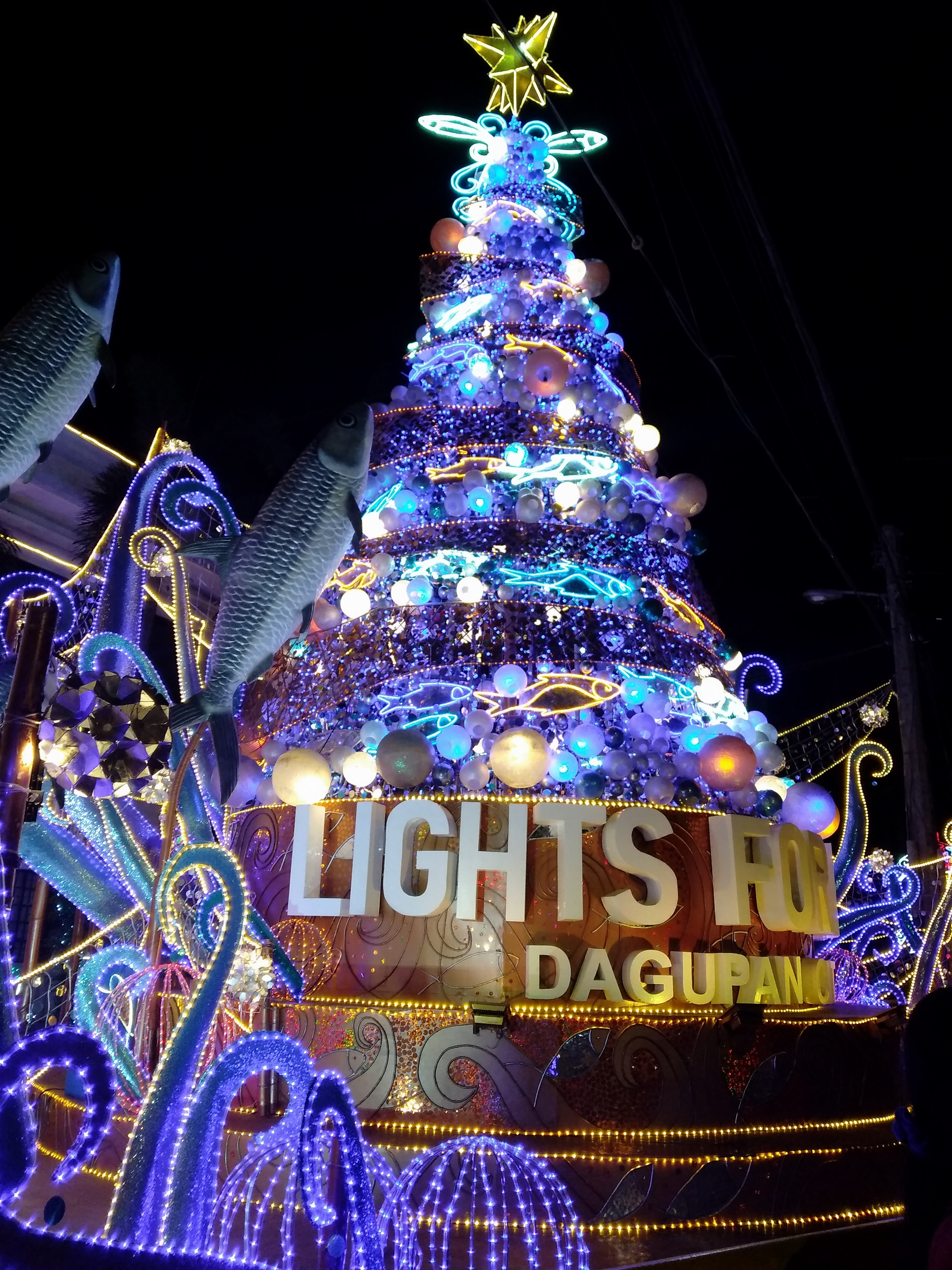
Christmas tree in front of Dagupan City Museum

Since it coincides with the Christmas festivities, Christmas decoration-building, nativity scene displays and Christmas tree using indigenous materials has become a permanent fixture in the Dagupan City Fiesta.

On The Edades Day, events such as Arts and Painting Contests are held on December 23, honoring national artist on Modern Arts Victorio Edades, a Dagupeño from Barangay Bolosan. Other events such Miss Dagupan pageant, job fairs, NGO, Organizations, & Barangay Nights, various alumni homecoming Nights, Battle of Bands, and Hip Hop Dance Contest, among others are usually parts of the festivities. The Dagupan City fiesta ends on Rizal Day at the Dagupan City Plaza.

== Government ==
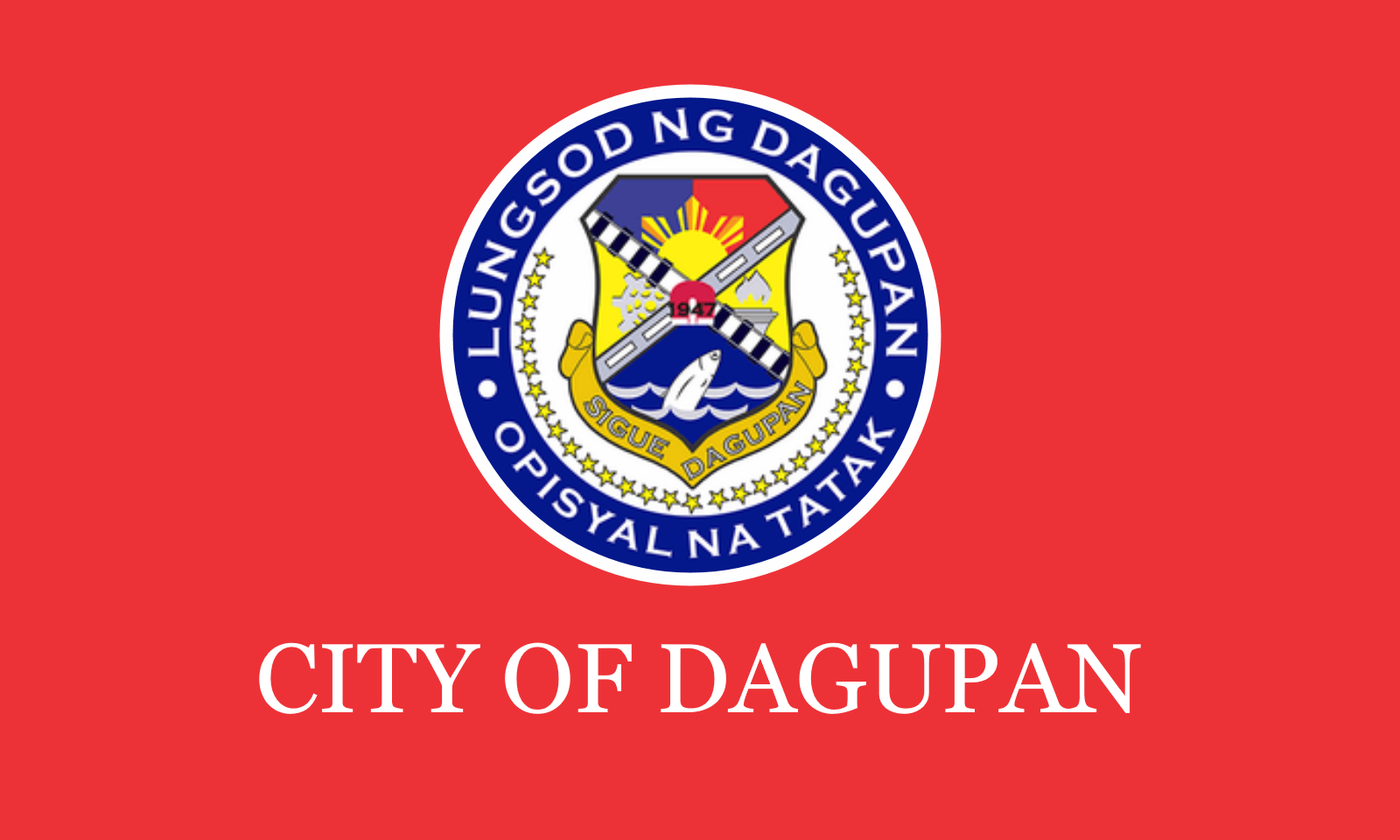
Former flag of Dagupan

Dagupan, belonging to the fourth congressional district of the province of Pangasinan, is governed by a mayor designated as its local chief executive and by a municipal council as its legislative body in accordance with the Local Government Code. The mayor, vice mayor, and the councilors are elected directly by the people through an election which is being held every three years.

=== Elected officials ===
Members of the Dagupan City Government (2025-2028)
| Position | Name |
|---|---|
| Representative | Gina de Venecia (Lakas) |
| City Mayor | Belen T. Fernandez (PFP) |
| City Vice-Mayor | Dean Bryan L. Kua (PFP) |
| City Councilors | Michael B. Fernandez (PFP) |
| City Councilors | Jose Netu M. Tamayo (PFP) |
| City Councilors | Christel Hilary Paras (PFP) |
| City Councilors | Jeslito C. Seen (PFP) |
| City Councilors | Karlos Liberato E. Reyna IV (PFP) |
| City Councilors | Danielle Francine B. Canto (PFP) |
| City Councilors | Luis M. Samson Jr. (PFP) |
| City Councilors | Marvin V. Fabia (PFP) |
| City Councilors | Jalice D. Cayabyab-Lalas (PFP) |
| City Councilors | Ma. Librada Fe M. Reyna-Macalanda (NP) |

== Transportation ==
=== Road and railway systems ===
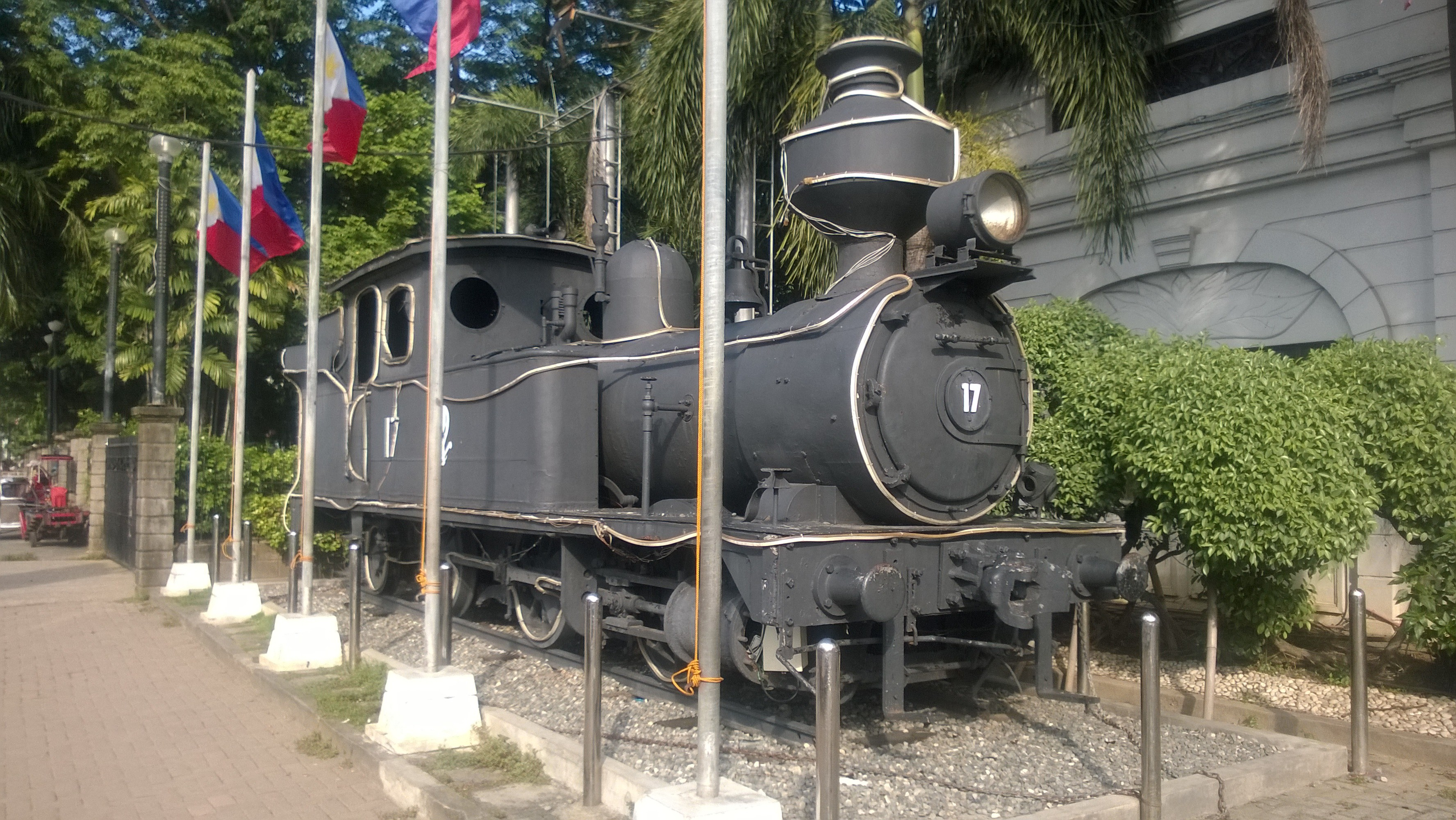
Remnant of Dagupan Class as displayed at Dagupan City Museum

Dagupan is connected with other cities by networks of national roads. Romulo Highway and Pangasinan–La Union Road (N55) and Urdaneta-Dagupan Road (N57) are the principal highways that serve the city.

The Philippine National Railways (PNR) once served Dagupan through Dagupan station, that went defunct in the late 1980s. The first railroad in the Philippines, the Manila-Dagupan Railway, terminated at the city.

=== Bus ===
Intercity/interprovincial buses from Manila serve the city, and are usually operated by Dagupan Bus Company, Victory Liner, Five Star, and Pangasinan Solid North. Jeepneys provide intracity travel, as well as for towns and cities of close proximities.

=== Taxi service ===
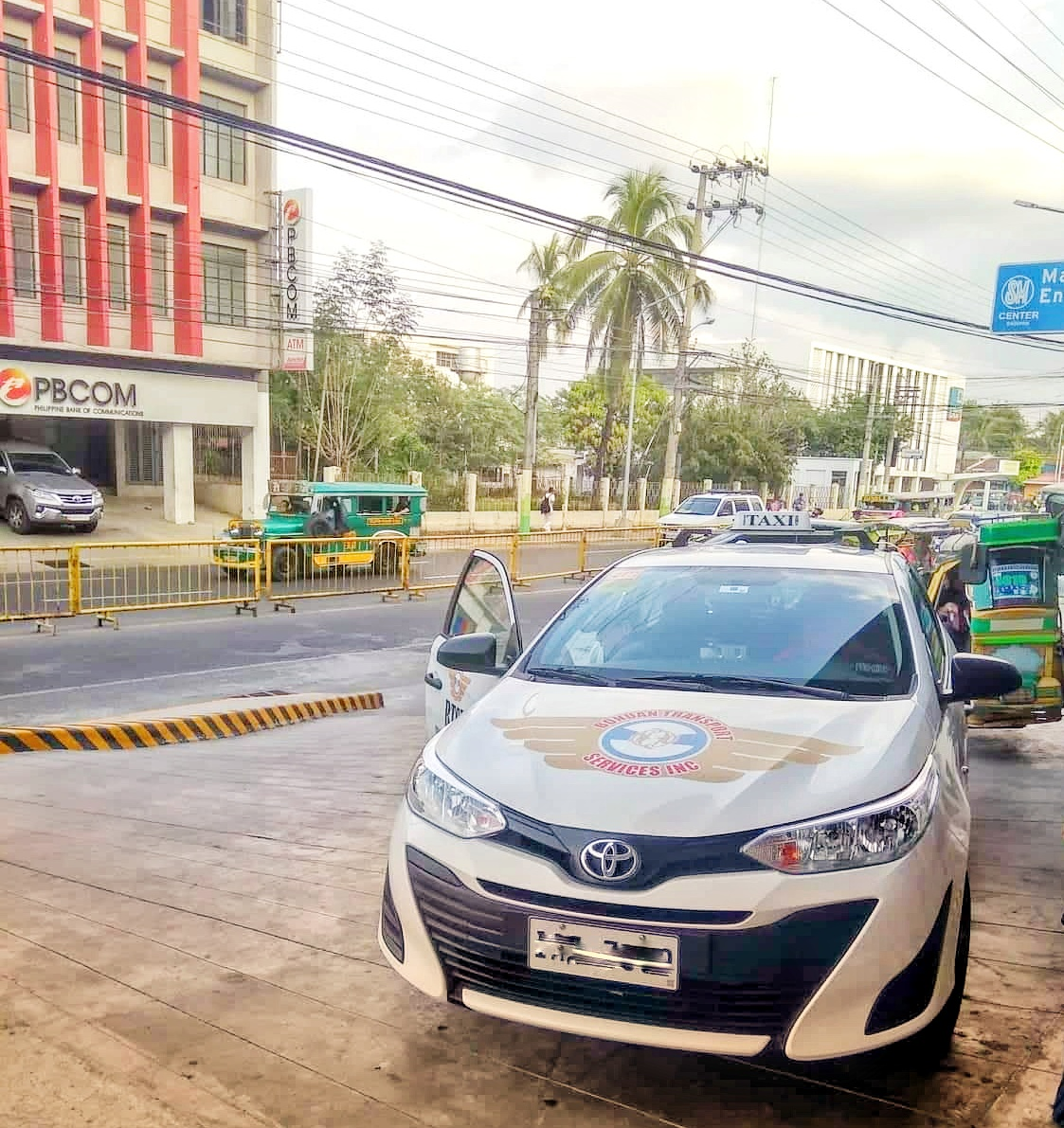
Taxi service in Dagupan. The first in Pangasinan and Region 1

Since 2019, taxi service becomes available as the newest transportation mode in the city. It is the first ever taxi operation in Region 1 and is authorized to serve Pangasinan and the entire Region 1. Dagupan was chosen as the launching area being the center of business and education in North Central Luzon.

=== Modern jeepney ===
Modern PUVs, more commonly known as modern jeepneys, now ply different parts of the city as part of the nationwide PUJ modernization campaign. They are equipped with CCTV cameras, air conditioning, a television, and equipment to comply with the government's health and safety protocols against COVID-19.

== Healthcare ==
Medical and health service centers abound in Dagupan. Out of 51 hospitals in Pangasinan, 12 are located in the city. The largest of these is the Region 1 Medical Center with hospital bed capacity of 1000. Other notable hospitals are Dagupan Doctors Villaflor Memorial Hospital, Nazareth General Hospital, and The Medical City Pangasinan.

== Education ==
Since the colonial era, Dagupan has always been the center of education in Ilocos Region (Region 1). The private sector-driven centers of education University of Pangasinan, Universidad de Dagupan, University of Luzon and Lyceum-Northwestern University lead 14 colleges and 18 vocational schools and 3 technical learning centers, 19 secondary schools and 53 elementary schools both in public and private.

The Dagupan City Schools Division Office governs all educational institutions within the municipality. It oversees the management and operations of all private and public, from primary to secondary schools.

=== Primary and elementary schools ===
- Creative Montessori Center
- Clifford Interactive Learning School
- Divine Word Academy of Dagupan
- Dominican School
- Ednas School
- Escuela de Nuestra Señora de La Salette (Elementary)
- Genesis Advanced Intech Academy
- Graystone Institute of the Philippines
- Harvent School
- Hilkan Montessori
- JCCMI Christian Academy
- Instituto Centro Asia
- La Marea Academy (Elementary)
- Living Lights Academy Foundation
- Mother Goose Playskool and Gradeschool
- Northfield Academy
- Oakridge International School of Young Leaders
- St. Albert the Great School
- St. John's Cathedral School
- St. Michael School By-the-Sea
- Wonderland School of Dagupan

=== Secondary schools ===
- Bonuan Boquig National High School
- Carael National High School
- Dagupan City National High School
- East Central Integrated School
- Escuela de Nuestra Señora de La Salette (High school)
- Federico N. Ceralde Integrated School
- Kingfisher School of Business and Finance (Senior High School)
- La Marea Academy (High School)
- Lyceum-Northwestern University General High School
- Francisco Q. Duque Medical Foundation Special Science High School
- Mother Goose Special Science High School
- Judge Jose de Venecia Sr. Technical-Vocational Secondary School
- Pugaro Integrated School
- Salapingao National High School

=== Higher educational institutions ===
- Aie College – Dagupan Campus
- AMA Computer College – Dagupan Campus
- Asiacareer College Foundation
- Asian Institute of E-Commerce
- Colegio de Dagupan
- Dagupan Colleges Foundation
- Escuela de Nuestra Señora de La Salette (College)
- Kingfisher School of Business and Finance
- Lyceum-Northwestern University
- Mary Help of Christians College Seminary
- Pangasinan Merchant Marine Academy
- Pimsat Colleges
- STI College – Dagupan Campus
- Universidad de Dagupan
- University of Luzon
- University of Pangasinan

== Public Malls and Markets ==
- CSI Mall Dagupan
- CSI Warehouse Club
- CSI Main
- CSI Market Square
- CSI Bonuan
- SM Center Dagupan
- Nepo Mall Dagupan
- CityMall Mayombo
- BHF Plaza Mayombo
- MAGIC Centerpoint
- MAGIC Club
- New Star Mall
- Dagupan Malimgas Market
- McAdore Market
- Magsaysay Fish Market
- Fora Mall Dagupan (U/C)
- SM City Dagupan (Planned)

== Media ==
Metro Dagupan is home to regional broadcasting stations and television networks. Twenty radio broadcasting Stations (9 AM and 11 FM), at least seventeen local newspapers and three cable television companies operate in the city. Daily flagship regional news over free TV is served by One North Central Luzon (formerly Balitang Amianan) via GMA Dagupan Station.

=== TV stations ===
- ALLTV Pangasinan (analog: Channel 3 and digital: Channel 30)
- IBC Pangasinan (analog: Channel 6 and digital: Channel 17)
- PTV Cordillera (analog: Channel 8 and digital: Channel 42)
- GMA Dagupan (analog: Channel 10 and digital: Channel 38)
- RPTV Pangasinan (analog: Channel 12 and digital: Channel 19)
- GTV Dagupan (analog: Channel 22 and digital: Channel 38)
- Hope Channel Dagupan (analog: Channel 24 and digital: Channel 44)
- One Media Network (digital: Channel 44)
- CLTV 36 (digital: Channel 36)
- TV5 Dagupan (analog: Channel 28 and digital: Channel 51)
- DepEd TV North Luzon (digital: Channel 41.7/Channel 47.7)
- S+A Channel 30 Pangasinan – (defunct)
- ABS-CBN Dagupan – (defunct)
- A2Z Pangasinan (digital: Channel 32)
- Light TV (digital: Channel 32)
- One Sports Pangasinan (analog: Channel 36 and digital: Channel 51)
- Net 25 Pangasinan (digital: Channel 46)
- INC TV Pangasinan (digital: Channel 46)

=== Cable and satellite TV ===
- Sky Cable Dagupan
- USATV
- Cignal TV

=== AM stations ===
- DZMQ Radyo Pilipinas 576 (DZMQ; Philippine Broadcasting Service).
- DWON RMN Dagupan 747 (DWON; Radio Mindanao Network)
- DZRD Sonshine Radio 981 (DZRD; Swara Sug Media Corporation)
- DWIN 1080 Radyo Agila (DWIN; Eagle Broadcasting Corporation)
- DZWN Bombo Radyo 1125 (DZWN; Bombo Radyo Philippines/People's Broadcasting Service)
- DWCM 1161 Aksyon Radyo (DWCM; Manila Broadcasting Company/Pacific Broadcasting System)
- DWPR 1296 Radyo Pilipino (DWPR; Radio Corporation of the Philippines)
- DZRH Nationwide 1440 (DWDH; Manila Broadcasting Company)
- GMA Super Radyo DZSD 1548 (Relay station of DZBB 594 Manila) (DZSD; GMA Network, Inc.)

=== FM stations ===
- 87.7 Choice Radio Dagupan
- 88.5 Radyo Pangasinan (DWJE; Pangasinan Gulf Waves Network Corporation, a former frequency of 95.3 FM from 2019 to 2021 and 88.1 FM from 2021 to 2026)
- 893 Home Radio (DWIZ; Aliw Broadcasting Corporation, a former branding as DWIZ News FM Dagupan)
- 90.3 Energy FM (DWKT; Ultrasonic Broadcasting System)
- 93.5 Barangay LS (DWTL; GMA Network, Inc.)
- 98.3 Love Radio (DWID; Manila Broadcasting Company)
- 100.7 Star FM (DWHY; Bombo Radyo Philippines/People's Broadcasting Service)
- 104.7 iFM (DWON; Radio Mindanao Network)
- 106.3 Yes FM (DWHR; Manila Broadcasting Company/Pacific Broadcasting System)
- 107.1 XFM Dagupan (DWGK; Yes2Health Broadcasting Network)
- 107.9 DWHT (DWHT FM; Relay station of DWWW / Broadcast Enterprises and Affiliated Media)

Seventeen local newspapers in Northern Luzon.

News and public affairs programs:

- Bagong Morning Kapamilya and TV Patrol North Luzon (ABS-CBN TV-32 Dagupan; former)
- LUZON HEADLINES (Highland TV / RNG Luzon )
- Kangrunag A Damag (PTV-8 Cordillera)
- One North Central Luzon and Mornings with GMA Regional TV (GMA Dagupan).

== Notable Personalities ==
- Marion Magat - Professional Basketball Player
- Jose Esteves - American Politician, former mayor of Milpitas, California
- Jose de Venecia Jr. - Former Speaker of the House of Representatives of the Philippines
- Cheryl Cosim - News Anchor
- Julius Babao - News Anchor
- Antonio Aquitania - Filipino actor
- Roi Fabito - Filipino-American YouTuber known by Guava Juice
- Maybelyn dela Cruz - Actress and former City Councilor of Dagupan

== Sister cities ==
- Guadalajara, Jalisco, Mexico
- Iwata, Shizuoka, Japan
- Milpitas, California, United States
- Tangier, Tanger-Tetouan-Al Hoceima, Morocco
- Cabanatuan, Philippines
- San Juan, Philippines
