= Escuela de Nuestra Señora de La Salette =

Roman Catholic school in Pangasinan, Philippines

- School of Our Lady of La Salette
- Motto: Faith Virtue Wisdom
- Type: Private De La Salle Supervised School
- Established: March 26, 1989
- Founder: Lina Galvan-Tan
- Religious affiliation: Roman Catholic
- Academic affiliations: CEAP APSCU
- President: Marianne Tan-Lor, MAEd
- Location: 30 Perez Blvd, Tapuac District, Dagupan 2400, Pangasinan, Philippines; 16°02′05″N 120°19′57″E
- Hymn: La Salle Alma Mater Hymn
- Patroness: Our Lady of La Salette
- Website: www.lasalette.edu.ph
- Location in Luzon Location in the Philippines

Escuela de Nuestra Señora de La Salette, also known as La Salette, is a private educational institution located in Dagupan, Philippines.

== History ==
The school was founded on March 26, 1989, by Dr. Lina Galvan-Tan and was named after the Virgin Mary of La Sallete in France. The school's name is the Spanish translation of School of Our Lady of La Salette. It started as a kindergarten school and expanded its course offerings by opening the grade school, high school, and the college level.

In November 2000, Escuela de Nuestra Señora de La Salette became a De La Salle Assistancy School through the Lasallian Schools Supervision Services Association, Inc. (LASSAI). In 2006, the school earned another Lasallian Accreditation and it is now known as a De La Salle Supervised School.

== Gallery ==
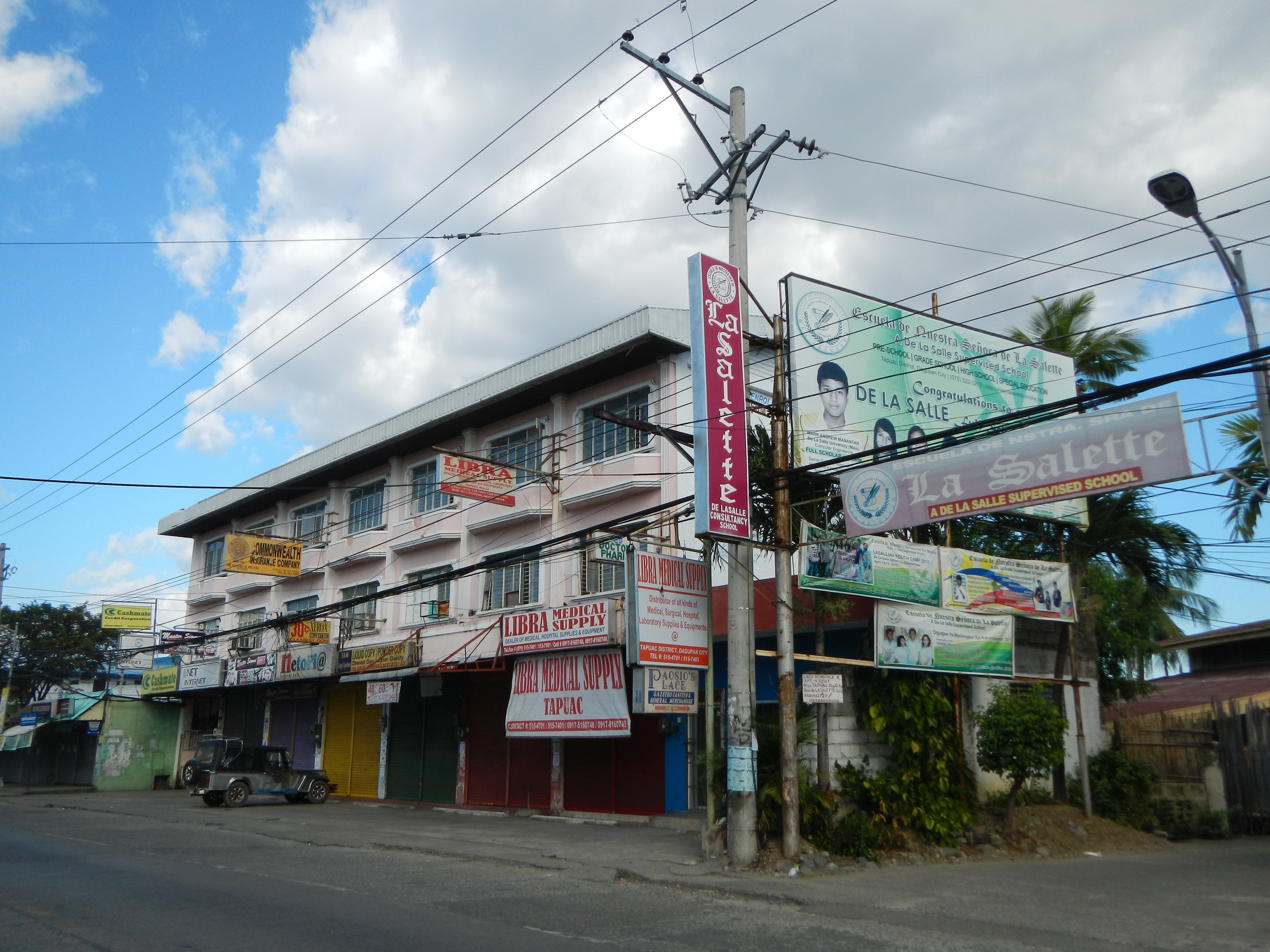
View from the National Road

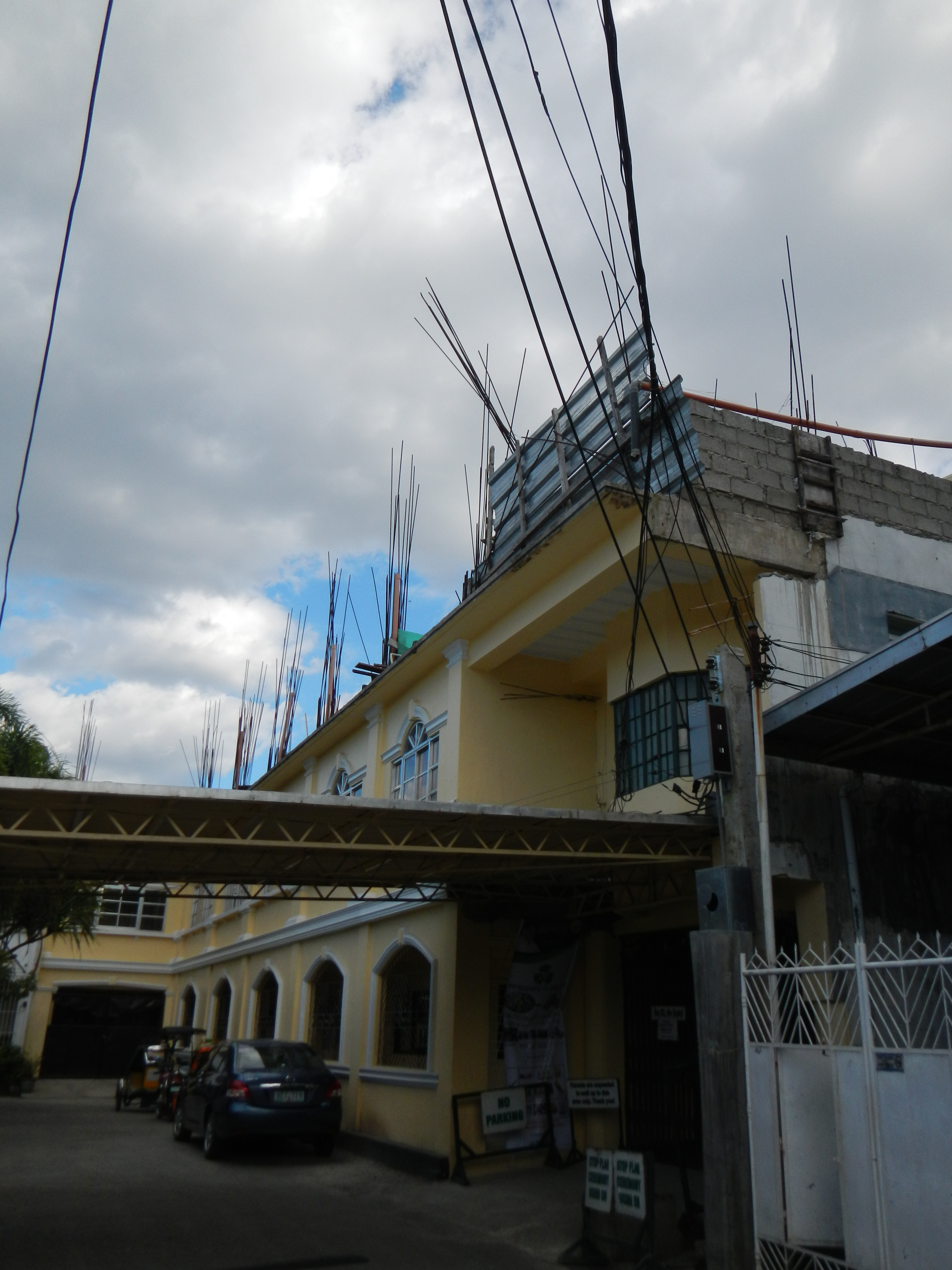
Facade of the Escuela de Nuestra Señora de La Salette

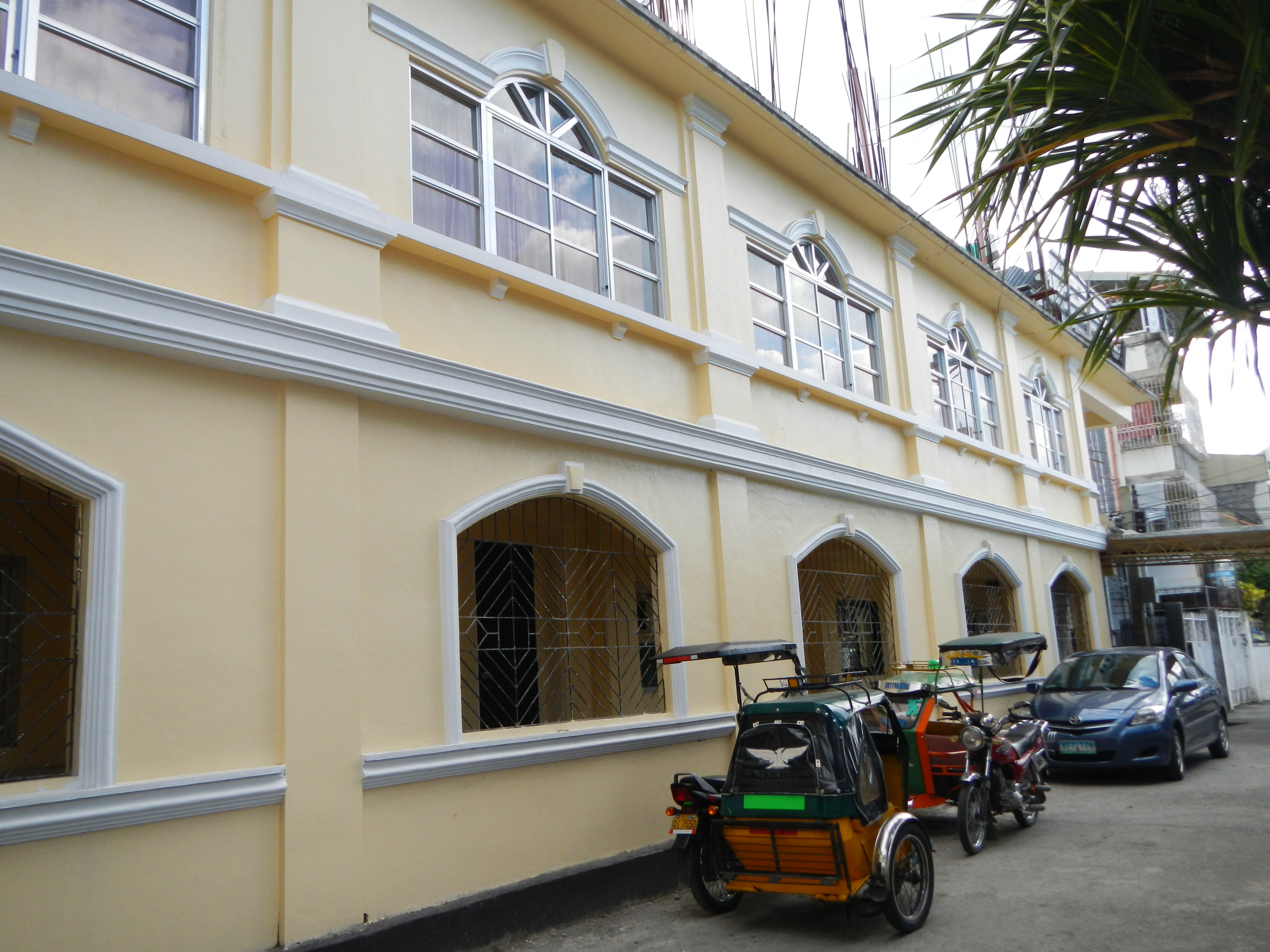
Side facade

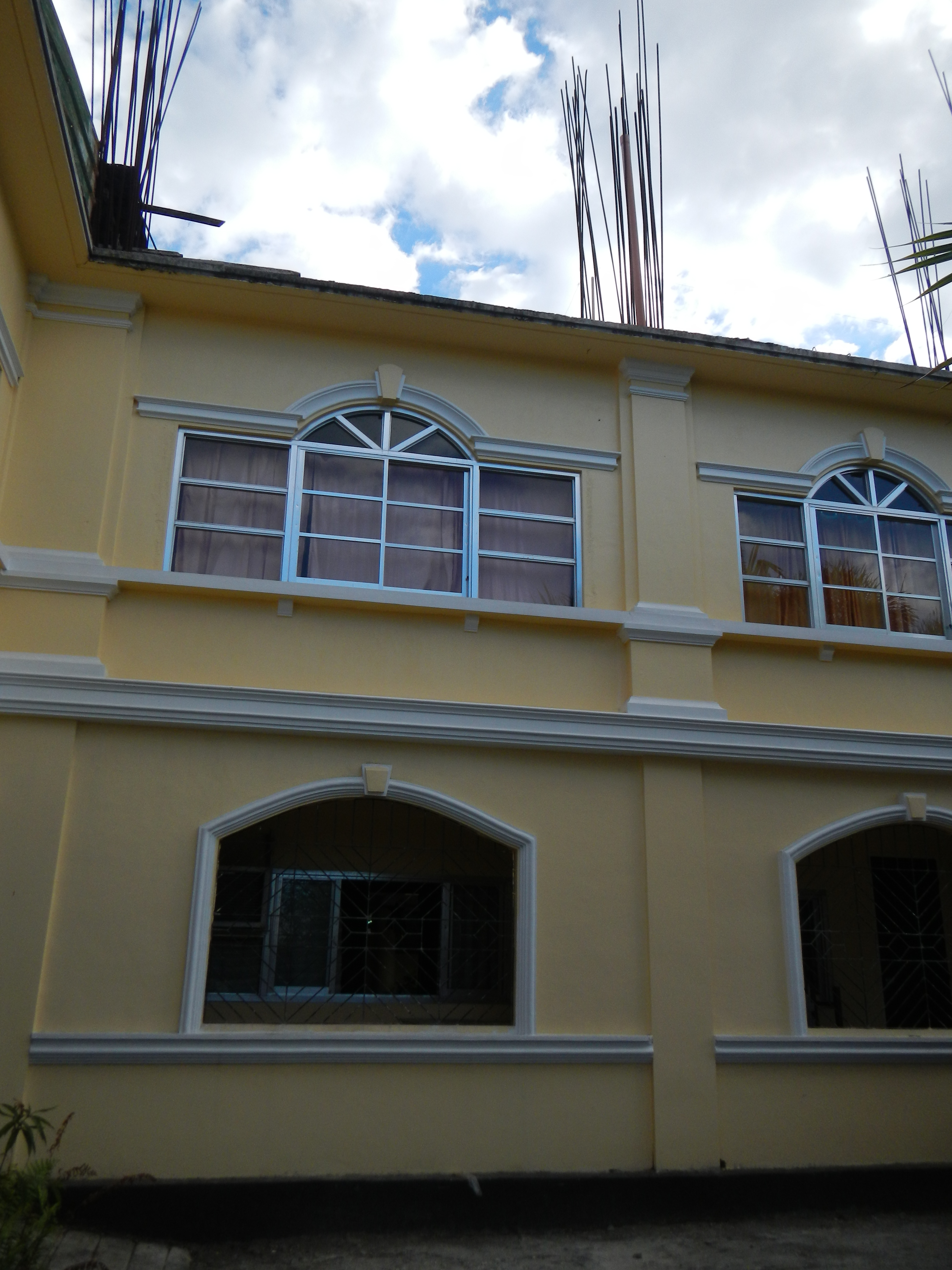
The Classrooms

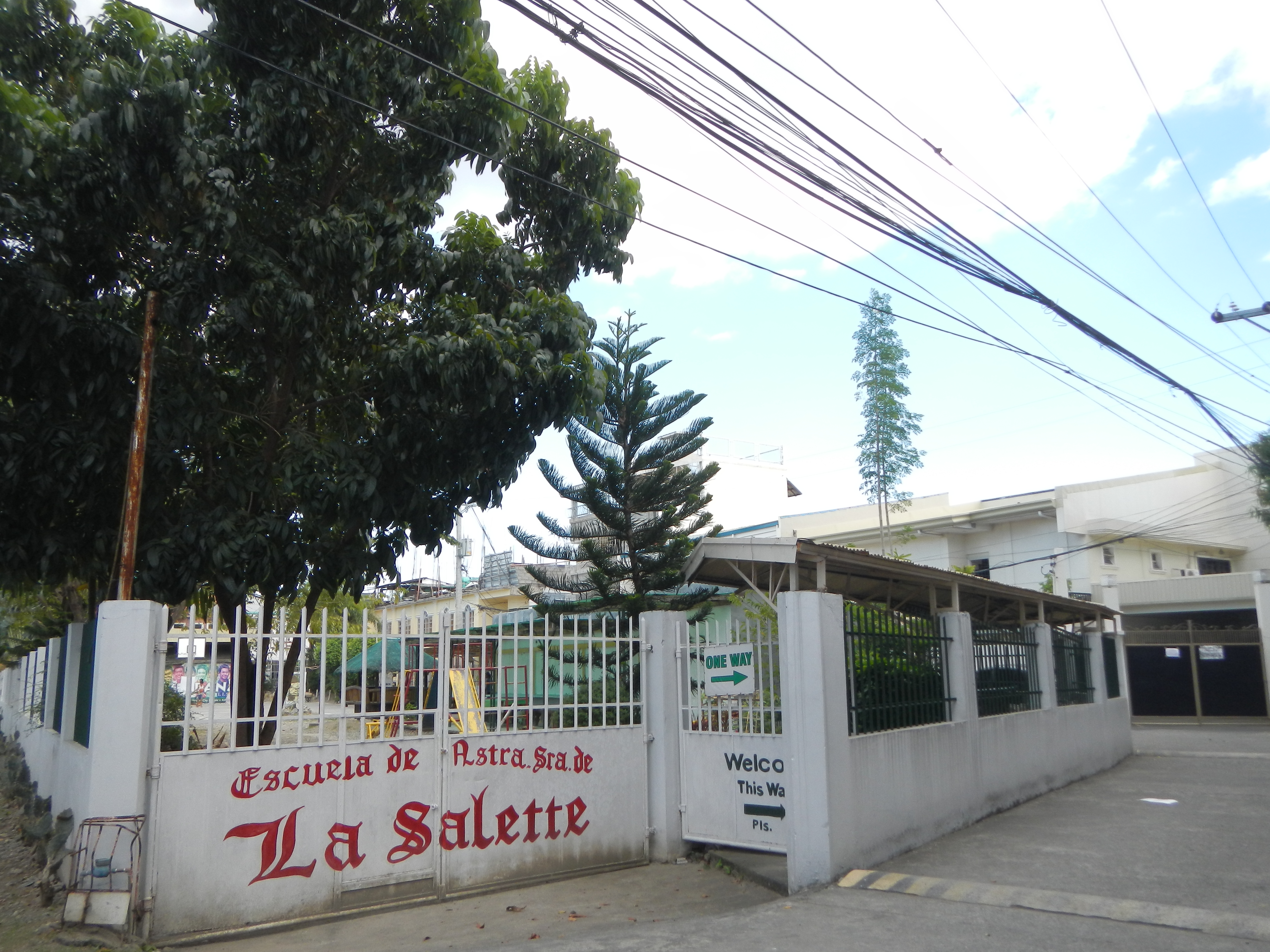
The entrance
