= List of GMA Network radio stations =

RGMA Network, Inc.
- Type: Subsidiary
- Branding: GMA Radio
- Country: Philippines
- Availability: Nationwide
- Founded: 1996
- Parent: GMA Network Inc. (49%)
- Key people: Felipe Gozon (Chairman); Glenn Allona (First Vice President, Radio Operations)

Super Radyo
- Type: Broadcast AM radio network, (News, Public Affairs, Talk, Drama)
- Country: Philippines
- Availability: Nationwide
- Motto: Walang kinikilingan, Walang pinoprotektahan, Noon at Ngayon Serbisyong Totoo, Radyo na, TV pa Balitang Tama Balitang Totoo
- Owner: GMA Network, Inc.
- Former names: Radyo Bisig Bayan (1989-1999)

Barangay LS
- Type: Broadcast FM radio network, (Contemporary MOR, OPM)
- Country: Philippines
- Availability: Nationwide
- Motto: Forever! Isang bansa, isang Barangay!
- Owner: GMA Network, Inc.
- Former names: Campus Radio (1992-2014)

The following is a list of radio stations owned by GMA Network Inc.

== Current ==
=== Super Radyo ===
Branding	Callsign	Frequency	Location
Super Radyo Manila	DZBB	594 kHz	Metro Manila
Super Radyo Dagupan (Note: Relay station of DZBB Manila.)	DZSD	1548 kHz	Dagupan
Super Radyo Palawan	DYSP	909 kHz	Puerto Princesa
Super Radyo Cebu	DYSS	999 kHz	Cebu City
Super Radyo Iloilo	DYSI	1323 kHz	Iloilo City
Super Radyo Zamboanga	DXRC	1287 kHz	Zamboanga City
Super Radyo Davao	DXGM	1125 kHz	Davao City

=== Barangay LS ===
Branding	Callsign	Frequency	Location
Barangay LS Manila	DWLS	97.1 MHz	Metro Manila
Barangay LS Baguio	DWRA	92.7 MHz	Baguio
Barangay LS Dagupan	DWTL	93.5 MHz	Dagupan
Barangay LS Tuguegarao	DWWQ	89.3 MHz	Tuguegarao
Barangay LS Lucena	DWQL	91.1 MHz	Lucena
Barangay LS Palawan	DYHY	97.5 MHz	Puerto Princesa
Barangay LS Naga	DWQW	101.5 MHz	Naga
Barangay LS Legazpi	DWCW	96.3 MHz	Legazpi
Barangay RU Kalibo (Note: Also carries the Super Radyo branding for its news and public affairs programming.)	DYRU	92.9 MHz	Kalibo
Barangay LS Iloilo	DYMK	93.5 MHz	Iloilo City
Barangay LS Bacolod	DYEN	107.1 MHz	Bacolod
Barangay LS Cebu	DYRT	99.5 MHz	Cebu City
Barangay LS Cagayan de Oro	DXLX	100.7 MHz	Cagayan de Oro
Barangay LS Davao	DXRV	103.5 MHz	Davao City
Barangay FM General Santos	DXCJ	102.3 MHz	General Santos

== Defunct/inactive ==
=== AM ===
Callsign	Frequency	Location
DWRA	1413 kHz	Baguio
DWRC	1170 kHz	Laoag
DYGM	1503 kHz	Roxas City
DYSB	1341 kHz	Bacolod
DXXY	1350 kHz	Dipolog
DXBB	1107 kHz	General Santos
DXRL	1341 kHz	Koronadal
DXBM	990 kHz	Cotabato City
DXYK	1179 kHz	Butuan

=== FM ===
Callsign	Frequency	Location	Status
DZLS	97.1 MHz	Laoag	Off the air.
DYXZ	96.9 MHz	Roxas City	Off the air.
DYAX	99.7 MHz	Calbayog	Off the air.
DYOU	97.5 MHz	Tacloban	Frequency currently owned by Far East Broadcasting Company under the callsign DYFE.
DXMJ	97.1 MHz	Zamboanga City	Off the air.
DXAX	102.5 MHz	Koronadal	Off the air.
DXND	90.1 MHz	Iligan	Frequency currently owned by Malindang Broadcasting Network Corporation.
DXYK	99.7 MHz	Butuan	Currently operated by Click General Merchandise.

== See also ==
- List of GMA Network stations
