= DYSS =

DYSS may refer to one of the following GMA Network-owned broadcasters in Cebu City, Philippines:

- DYSS-AM, a radio station (999 AM), broadcasting as DYSS Super Radyo Cebu
- DYSS-TV, a television station (channel 7), broadcasting as GMA 7 Cebu

== See also ==
- Dyss, the Danish name for a type of megalithic tomb
