= D-5-YB-TV =

Television station in Valencia, Negros Oriental, Philippines

GMA TV-5 Dumaguete (D-5-YB-TV)
Relay of DYSS-TV
- Philippines
- Channels: Analog: 5 (VHF); Digital: 22 (UHF) (ISDB-T); Virtual: 5.01
- Branding: GMA TV-5 Dumaguete

Programming
- Subchannels: See list
- Affiliations: 5.1: GMA; 5.2: GTV; 5.3: Heart of Asia; 5.4: I Heart Movies

Ownership
- Owner: GMA Network Inc.
- Sister stations: DYBM-TV (GTV)

History
- Founded: 1995
- Former affiliations: KBS/RPN/New Vision 9 (1972-1995)

Technical information
- Licensing authority: NTC
- Power: 1 kW TPO (analog/digital)
- Transmitter coordinates: 9°18′23″N 123°13′50″E

Links
- Website: gmanetwork.com gmaregionaltv.com

D-5-YB-TV (channel 5) is a television station airing programming from GMA Network. Owned and operated by the network's namesake corporate parent alongside GTV (DYBM channel 28). Both stations share transmitter facilities at Barangay Palinpinon, Valencia, Negros Oriental (with the previous location being in Barangay Looc, Sibulan until 2023). Since 2021, it has been a relay of GMA Cebu (DYSS TV-7) to broadcast its local newscast Balitang Bisdak.

== Digital channels ==
D-5-YB-TV's digital signal operates on UHF channel 22 (521.143 MHz) and broadcasts on the following subchannels:

Channel	Video	Aspect	Short name	Programming	Note
5.01	480i	4:3	GMA	GMA Dumaguete (Main D-5-YB-TV programming)	Commercial broadcast (5 kW)
5.02	480i	4:3	GTV	GTV	Commercial broadcast (5 kW)
5.03	480i	4:3	HEART OF ASIA	Heart of Asia	Commercial broadcast (5 kW)
5.06	480i	4:3	I HEART MOVIES	I Heart Movies	Commercial broadcast (5 kW)
5.21	240p	4:3	GMA 1SEG	GMA Dumaguete Relay	1seg broadcast

== GMA TV-5 Dumaguete current programs ==
- Balitang Bisdak

== GMA TV-5 Dumaguete former programs ==
- GMA Regional TV Live!

== See also ==
- List of GMA Network stations
