= Eat Na Ta! =

Philippine television variety show

- Genre: Variety show
- Based on: Eat Bulaga!
- Written by: Restie Nur
- Presented by: Bobby Nalzaro; Choopetah; Papa Joe; Cutie Del Mar; Undoy Z
- Opening theme: Eat Na Ta! theme song
- Country of origin: Philippines
- Original language: Cebuano

Production
- Production locations: Cebu, Philippines
- Editors: Ivan Lopez; Levi James Ligon; Marc Real; Roy Diomampo
- Camera setup: Multiple-camera setup
- Running time: 30 minutes
- Production company: Television and Production Exponents (TAPE) Inc.

Original release
- Network: GMA Cebu
- Release: November 12, 2007 – 2008

Eat Na Ta! is a Philippine television variety show broadcast by GMA Cebu. The show's initial broadcast was on November 12, 2007, as a daily game show on DYSS Super Radyo Cebu, and later evolved into a live TV program aired on GMA Cebu as a pre-programming for Eat Bulaga!.

== Hosts ==
- Bobby Nalzaro
- Choopetah
- Cutie del Mar
- Papa Joe
- Cerj Michael a.k.a. Undoy Z

== Segments ==
- Itaktak Gyud
- Ang Akong Pangandoy
- Greetings Galore Inday M
- BobBest Nalzaro
- Kurata Uy
- Soroy - soroy ni UNDOY Z
- Kwarta Na Ni
