= DYSS-TV =

- GMA Cebu Complex in 2022
- Cebu City; Philippines
- Channels: Analog: 7 (VHF); Digital: 26 (UHF) (ISDB-T); Virtual: 7
- Branding: GMA TV-7 Cebu; GMA Central & Eastern Visayas

Programming
- Subchannels: See § Subchannels
- Affiliations: 7.1: GMA; 7.2: GTV; 7.3: Heart of Asia; 7.4: I Heart Movies

Ownership
- Owner: GMA Network Inc.
- Sister stations: DYLS-TV (GTV); GMA Super Radyo DYSS 999; Barangay LS 99.5

History
- First air date: February 5, 1962; 64 years ago
- Former affiliations: RBS TV (1962–1972)
- Call sign meaning: From DYSS radio: Super Radyo Sugbo

Technical information
- Licensing authority: NTC
- Power: Analog: 50 kW; Digital: 10 kW
- ERP: Analog: 259 kW; Digital: 77.7 kW
- Transmitter coordinates: 10°21′49″N 123°51′13″E
- Translator(s): See § Rebroadcasters

Links
- Website: GMANetwork.com

DYSS-TV (VHF channel 7) is a local television station in Metro Cebu, Philippines, serving as the Visayas flagship of the GMA television network. The digital service is known as DYSS-DTV by only a few people. It is owned and operated by the network's namesake corporate parent alongside GTV outlet DYLS-TV (channel 27). Its studios are located at the GMA Skyview Complex, Nivel Hills, Barangay Apas, Cebu City, while its hybrid transmitting facilities atop Mount Bonbon, Barangay Babag.

== Timeline ==
- February 5, 1962 – GMA Cebu traces its roots to DYSS radio, which launched its first provincial AM station in Cebu City on July 4, 1957, under Loreto F. de Hemedes Inc., led by Robert “Uncle Bob” Stewart. Its early studio was in the Fortunata Building, while its antenna and transmitter were located in Brgy. Mambaling, Cebu City. Building on radio success, the company launched DYSS-TV Channel 7 in 1961, four months after Manila’s DZBB-TV, starting with a 100-watt transmitter and 6.5 hours of daily programming.
- February 18, 1963 – DYSS-TV Channel 7 began commercial broadcasts as Cebu City's second VHF station, following ABS Channel 3. Its studio and transmitter were located on the 10th floor of the Luym Building (now Ludo and Luym) at Plaridel and Juan Luna Streets (now Osmeña Boulevard).
- September 21, 1972 – Due to President Ferdinand Marcos’ Martial Law declaration under Proclamation 1081, DYSS-TV was forced to cease operations.
- 1974 – DYSS-TV became an originating station with its own English newscast, GMA News Digest Cebu, affiliated with GMA News Roundup.
- 1979 – DYSS-TV upgraded to a 5-kilowatt TPO (50 kW ERP), boosting signal coverage across Metro Cebu, GMA News Digest Cebu was rebranded as News at Seven Cebu. This marked the launch of GMA’s first local and one of the longest-running regional newscasts in the Visayas, created to compete with GTV-3’s News Today. DYSS-TV thus became the first GMA regional station to introduce localized news.
- 1981 – To better serve local audiences, DYSS-TV introduced its first Cebuano-language newscast, Mga Balita sa Kilum-Kilum, along with a business program highlighting Cebuano entrepreneurs.
- 1990 – DYSS-TV relocated its studios and transmitter to the GMA Skyview Complex in Nivel Hills, Apas, upgrading to a 30-kilowatt transmitter. This move enhanced broadcast equipment and significantly improved signal reception across Metro Cebu and the Central and Eastern Visayas.
- April 30, 1992 – In line with GMA's coverage expansion following the launch of the Tower of Power in Metro Manila, DYSS-TV joined the Rainbow Satellite Network to relay national programming across the Philippines and Southeast Asia, while continuing local content in Cebu.
- October 4, 1999 – GMA Cebu launched Balitang Bisdak under GMA News and Public Affairs, with Bobby Nalzaro as anchor following his move from Bombo Radyo Cebu in 1997. That same day, the channel debuted Singgit Cebu, a musical variety show taped alternately at SM City Cebu. Around this time, GMA Channel 7 Cebu also produced the Cebuano drama Ang Bastonero, which was simulcast on TV-5 Davao.
- April 24, 2015 – GMA layoffs 200 employees, including some in Cebu, due to the strategic 'streamline' for its regional stations. This includes the cancellation of its morning program Buena Mano Balita.
- November 13, 2017 – Following the launch of the GMA Regional TV division, Balitang Bisdak was relaunched in the style of sister newscasts Balitang Amianan and One Mindanao. It began simultaneous broadcasts across key areas in Central and Eastern Visayas via local channels like TV-10 Tacloban, TV-11 Bohol, and TV-12 Ormoc, later expanding to TV-5 Dumaguete, TV-5 Calbayog, and TV-8 Borongan starting in May 2021.
- May 23, 2018 – GMA Cebu began ISDB-T digital test broadcasts on UHF Channel 26 with a 15-kilowatt power output (77.7 kW ERP) spending ₱87.66 million for the upgrade.
- June 29, 2020 – Due to the escalating COVID-19 situation in Cebu City, GMA Regional TV suspended GMA Cebu's program production, temporarily replacing it with One Western Visayas from GMA TV-6 Iloilo. The setup lasted until July 10, with local programming resuming on July 13.
- December 16, 2021 – In the aftermath of Typhoon "Rai" (Odette), GMA Cebu suspended operations for the second time due to damage to power lines and nearby trees affecting its complex and transmitters. It resumed limited broadcasts the following day, airing emergency programming— including Balitang Bisdak and 24 Oras— from 4:00 to 8:00 p.m.
- January 12, 2022 – After power was restored in Brgy. Apas, GMA Cebu resumed local program and religious show production, while continuing to air satellite-fed content from its flagship station in Quezon City. It initially reclaimed 18–19 hours of daily airtime, with primetime limited to 6:30–11:30 p.m. due to Typhoon Rai’s impact. Within weeks, the station fully returned to its regular broadcast schedule.
- July 2023 – GMA Cebu among the network's originating stations in the Philippines (outside GMA Manila) upgrades to its 16:9 widescreen format.

== GMA TV-7 Cebu Programs ==
- Balitang Bisdak
- Word of God Network
- Sunday Catholic TV Mass Cebu (produced in cooperation with Daughters of St. Paul – Cebu)
- Sinulog Festival (annually, every 3rd Sunday of January)

== GMA TV-7 Cebu Previously Aired Programs ==
- 24 Oras Central Visayas
- Ang Bastonero (1999–2000) (also broadcast over GMA TV-5 Davao)
- Araguy
- Buena Mano Balita
- Coffee with Us (1978–1981)
- Eat Na Ta!
- GMA Musicale
- GMA News Cebu
- GMA Regional TV Live!
- Goot da Wanderpol (also broadcast over SBN-GMA TV-7 Davao) (1989–early 1990s)
- Holy Mass
- Istayl Nato
- Central Visayas Isyu Karon
- Ka Ina (first broadcast on Citynet 27 Manila)
- Kape at Balita
- Let's Fiesta
- Mga Balita sa Kilum-Kilum (1981–1986)
- News at Seven Cebu (1978–1999)
- News Digest Cebu (1974–1978)
- Oi!
- Sabado Box Office Hits
- Siete Palabras @ Cebu Metropolitan Cathedral (every Good Friday)
- Siete Palabras (annually, every Good Friday, produced in cooperation with Archdiocese of Cebu)
- Singgit Cebu (1999–2005)
- The Visayan Agenda (special programming for 2010 elections)
- Visita Iglesia

== Notable former on-air personalities ==
- Bobby Nalzaro (1997–2021)

== Digital television ==
=== Subchannels ===
DYSS-TV's digital signal operates on UHF channel 26 (545.143 MHz) and broadcasts on the following subchannels:

Subchannel	Res.	Name	Programming	Note
7.01	480i	GMA	GMA Cebu (Main DYSS-TV programming)	Commercial broadcast (10 kW)
7.02	480i	GTV	GTV	Commercial broadcast (10 kW)
7.03	480i	HEART OF ASIA	Heart of Asia	Commercial broadcast (10 kW)
7.04	480i	I HEART MOVIES	I Heart Movies	Commercial broadcast (10 kW)
7.31	240p	GMA 1SEG	GMA Cebu Relay	(1seg)

== Areas of coverage ==
- Bohol (including Tagbilaran City)
- Cebu Province (including Cebu City, Lapu-Lapu City, Mandaue City and Talisay City)
- Leyte (including Ormoc City, Baybay and Palompon)
- Portion of Negros Oriental
- Siquijor

== Rebroadcasters ==
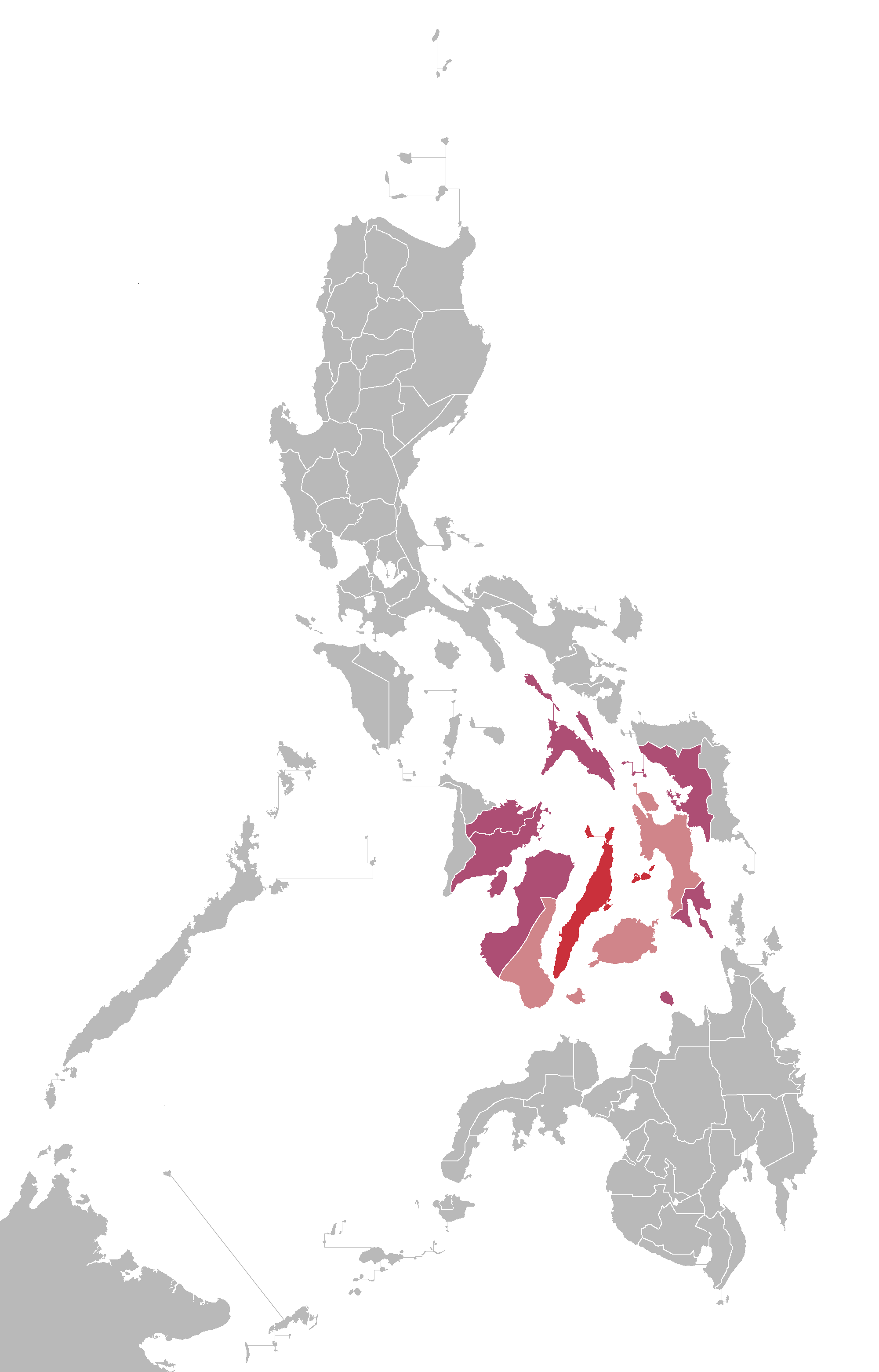
Red: Home location of GMA Cebu Light red and red: Market audience of GMA Cebu Violet: Areas that may receive signals from GMA Cebu

DYSS-TV's programming is relayed to the following stations across Central and Eastern Visayas.

Relay stations
Call sign	Location	Channel	TPO	Coordinates
D-5-YB	Valencia, Negros Oriental (Note: Relay since 2021)	5 (analog, VHF); 22 (digital, UHF)	1 kW (analog/digital)	9°18′23″N 123°13′50″E
D-11-YE	Tagbilaran, Bohol (Note: Relay since 2017)	11 (analog, VHF)	2 kW (10.39 kW ERP) (analog)	9°37′59″N 123°52′59″E
DYCL	Tacloban	10 (analog, VHF); 34 (digital, UHF)	5 kW (analog/digital)	11°14′38″N 124°57′59″E
DYIL	Ormoc, Leyte	12 (analog, VHF)	1 kW (analog)	11°0′29″N 124°36′54″E
DYAS	Calbayog, Samar	5 (analog, VHF)	1 kW (15 kW ERP) (analog)	12°4′1″N 124°34′52″E
DYVB	Borongan, Eastern Samar	8 (analog, VHF)	1 kW (25 kW ERP) (analog)	11°37′9″N 125°25′57″E

== See also ==
- DZBB-TV
- DYRT
- DYSS-AM
- GMA Network
- List of GMA Network stations
