= Kapuso =

Kapuso is the Tagalog word for "one at heart".

Kapuso may refer to:

- GMA Network Inc., Philippine media and entertainment conglomerate
  - GMA Network, known as the Kapuso Network, a television network in the Philippines
