= Papa Dudut =

Filipino radio disc jockey (born 1986)

- Born: Renz Mark Jairuz L. Ricafrente; February 25, 1986 (age 40)
- Education: Southern Luzon State University (BA)
- Occupations: Radio host, disc jockey, enterpreneur
- Years active: 2000s–present
- Employer(s): GMA Network; Manila Broadcasting Company (c. 2003)
- Notable work: Barangay Love Stories
- Children: 2

YouTube information
- Channel: Papa Dudut
- Years active: 2016–present
- Genres: Audio drama, storytelling, horror, vlog
- Subscribers: 2.6 million
- Views: 629.3 million
- Last updated: November 13, 2026
- Website: papadudutofficial.com

Renz Mark Jairuz L. Ricafrente, known professionally as Papa Dudut, is a Filipino radio and TV host, disc jockey, and enterpreneur. He is best known as the host of Barangay Love Stories on Barangay LS, which also has a television adaptation on GMA Network.

== Early life and education ==
Renz Mark Jairuz Ricafrente was born on February 25, 1986. A native of Guinayangan, Quezon, Ricafrente and his siblings were raised by his mother. His police father died when he was just two years old. He gained a stepfather after his mother remarry ten years later.

He studied at the Southern Luzon State University, graduating with a degree in communication in 2007.

== Career ==
Ricafrente, who would later became known as Papa Dudut, started his career when he was still a college student. He became a disc jockey at RGMA 91.1 Campus Radio in Lucena. At 17 years old, Papa Dudut joined MBC Lucban.

Papa Dudut became known as host of the radio programs Barangay Love Stories and anthology Radyo Nobela on Barangay LS 97.1. He also is a DJ at Barangay LS. Commenting on the role, Papa Dudut remarked that there is "no script" in choosing songs and commenting as a DJ. Papa Dudut also provides love advice based on his own experiences in heartbreak and also allow them to come to their own conclusions.

Papa Dudut later expanded platforms with the Barangay Love Stories becoming a podcast with 1.7 million followers as of 2026. Barangay Love Stories also gained a television adaptation which premiered in September 2026 on GMA Network. Additionaly, he is the voiceover for Family Feud, also on GMA.

Papa Dudut is also an enterpreneur since 2019, running businesses across wellness, food, digital media, and commercial real estate in Metro Manila, Bulacan, and Rizal.

== Personal life ==
Papa Dudut is married to Jenymae. The couple has a pair of twins who were born in 2024. The twins were born out of in vitro fertilization with his wife carrying the pregnancy. Jenymae had hydrosalpinx and her fallopian tubes had to be removed, rendering her unable to have future pregnancies.

His grandfather who bore the surname Ricafrente was one of the pioneers of DZMM, although Papa Dudut never personally met him.

== Honors and recognition ==
Year	Category	Result	Ref.
2020	Special Citation as the Best FM Radio Program Host	Won	
2021	Best FM Radio Program Host	Won	
2024	Laurus Nobilis Media Excellence in Radio Disc Jockeying (Male Category)	Won	
