= DYBB-TV =

Television station in Numancia, Aklan, Philippines

GMA TV-2 Kalibo (DYBB-TV)
Relay of DYXX-TV
- Philippines
- Channels: Analog: 2 (VHF); Digital: TBA (UHF)
- Branding: GMA TV-2 Kalibo

Programming
- Affiliations: GMA Network

Ownership
- Owner: GMA Network Inc.
- Sister stations: DXBL-TV (GTV); Barangay RU 92.9 Super Radyo Kalibo

History
- Founded: 2001
- Former channel number: 8 (2001-2010)
- Call sign meaning: DY; Bisig; Bayan (or BoB Stewart)

Technical information
- Licensing authority: NTC
- Power: 1 kW
- ERP: 5 kW
- Transmitter coordinates: 11°43′5″N 122°21′41″E

Links
- Website: gmanetwork.com

DYBB-TV (VHF Channel 2) is a television station airing programming from GMA Network and GMA Manila. It is owned and operated by the network's namesake corporate parent alongside GTV outlet DXBL-TV (UHF channel 27). Both stations share transmitter facilities at Barangay Bulwang, Numancia, Aklan

== History ==
- 2001 - Launch GMA Kalibo semi-satellite Ratsada relay as DYXX-TV.
- November 13, 2015 - Final episode of Ratsada simulcast by Barangay RU 92.9 and GMA Iloilo, downgrading the station to a relay station that broadcasts Metro Manila programs via DZBB-TV.
- August 27, 2018 - Launch One Western Visayas on GMA Iloilo simulcast by GMA Capiz, GMA Kalibo, and Barangay RU 92.9 Kalibo.

== GMA TV-2 Kalibo current programs ==
- Ratsada Balita

== GMA TV-2 Kalibo former programs ==
- GMA Regional TV Early Edition
- One Western Visayas

== See also ==
- DYRU
- List of GMA Network stations
