= DWWQ-FM =

Barangay LS Tuguegarao (DWWQ)
- Tuguegarao; Philippines
- Broadcast area: Cagayan, Isabela and surrounding areas
- Frequency: 89.3 MHz
- Branding: Barangay LS 89.3

Programming
- Languages: Ibanag, Filipino
- Format: Contemporary MOR, OPM
- Network: Barangay LS

Ownership
- Owner: GMA Network Inc.
- Sister stations: GMA TV-7 Tuguegarao; GTV 27 Tuguegarao

History
- First air date: 1996
- Former names: Campus Radio (1996-February 16, 2014)

Technical information
- Licensing authority: NTC
- Class: C, D and E
- Power: 10,000 watts
- ERP: 30,000 watts

Links
- Website: www.gmanetwork.com

DWWQ (89.3 FM), broadcasting as Barangay LS 89.3, is a radio station owned and operated by GMA Network Inc. The station's studio and transmitter are located at the 4th Floor, VillaBlanca Hotel, Pattaui St., Brgy. Ugac Norte, Tuguegarao.

The station was launched in 1996 under the Campus Radio branding. On February 16, 2014, it was rebranded as Barangay FM as part of RGMA's brand unification. On April 6, 2026, following the unified branding with the flagship FM station in Metro Manila, the station transitioned to the Barangay LS branding.
