= Annette Gozon-Valdes =

Filipino lawyer, film producer and actress

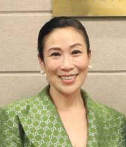
- Gozon-Valdes in 2025
- Born: Anna Teresa M. Gozon; November 3, 1972 (age 53)
- Education: Ateneo de Manila University (BS); University of the Philippines (LLB); Harvard University (LLM)
- Occupations: Business executive; lawyer
- Years active: 2000–present
- Title: Senior Vice-President of GMA Network; President of GMA Pictures; Head of Sparkle Artist Center
- Spouse: Lito Abrogar (ann. 2015) Shintaro Valdes (m. 2016)
- Children: 2
- Father: Felipe Gozon

Anna Teresa "Annette" M. Gozon-Valdes (born November 3, 1972) is a Filipino business executive, lawyer, professor, film producer, scriptwriter and actress. She is the Senior Vice President of GMA Network, one of the largest media networks in the Philippines.

== Early life and education ==
Anna Teresa M. Gozon-Valdes was born on November 3, 1972. Her parents are Felipe Gozon, a lawyer who is the former CEO and chairman of the board members of the GMA Network, and Teresa "Tessie" Gozon, a former bank employee and housewife. She is the eldest daughter with two younger siblings, Philip Gozon, a lawyer, and Maritess Gozon-Vitebro, a doctor.

She attended her primary and secondary education at Colegio San Agustin – Makati where she graduated valedictorian. In college, Gozon graduated cum laude with a Bachelor of Science in Management Engineering degree from the Ateneo de Manila University in 1993.

In 1997, she obtained a Bachelor of Laws degree and graduated cum laude and valedictorian from the University of the Philippines College of Law (UP Law). She was an associate professor at U.P. College of Law where she taught taxation and legal history. She obtained a Master of Laws degree from Harvard Law School in Cambridge, Massachusetts, United States.

== Career ==
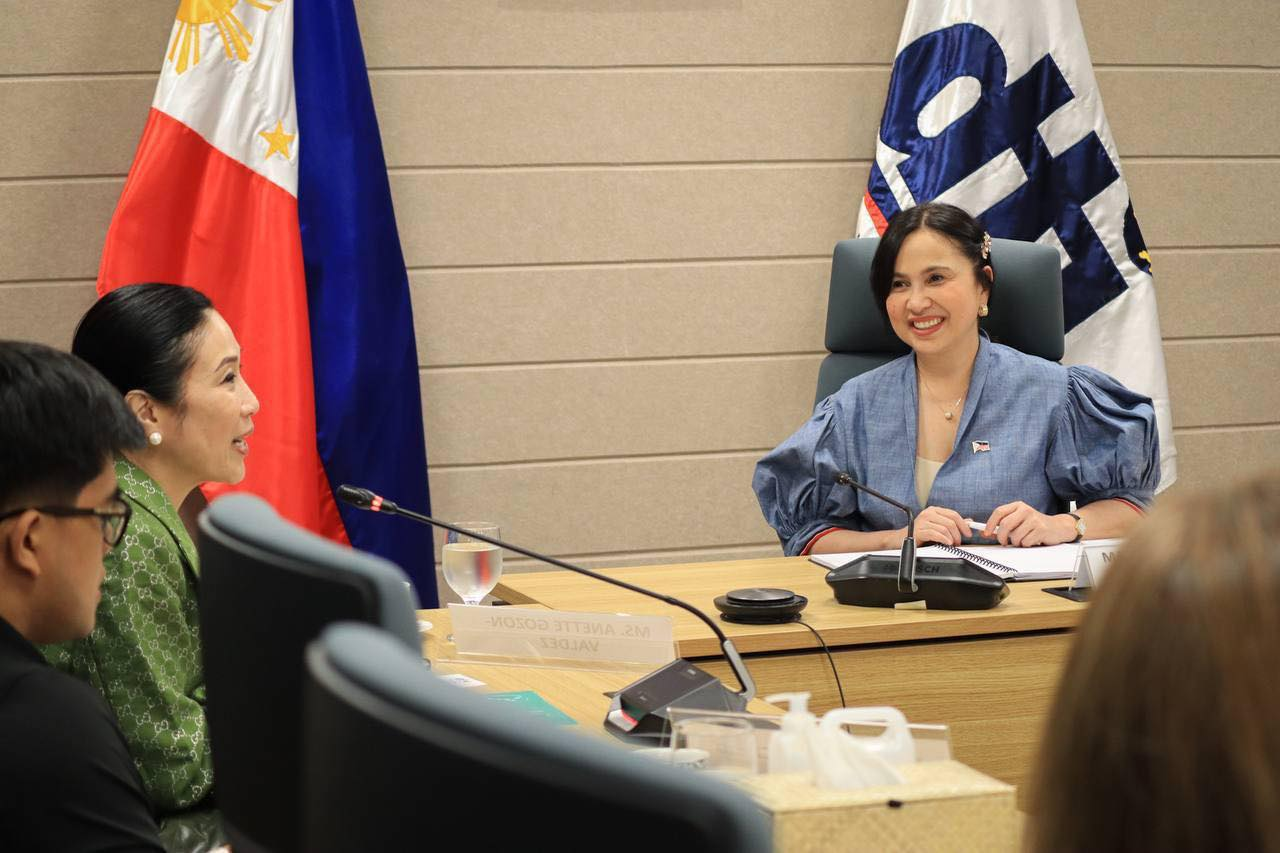
Gozon-Valdes (left) meeting with DTI secretary Cristina Aldeguer-Roque in 2025

Gozon-Valdes started her career as a junior partner (on leave) of Belo Gozon Elma Parel Asuncion & Lucila Law firm, before becoming part of the GMA Network Inc. Board of Directors in 2000. In 2022, she was elected to the position of Senior Vice-president of GMA Network on September 1, 2022. She is responsible for overseeing various departments including the Legal Department, Talent Management and Development, Program Management, Human Resource Department (HRM) and several network subsidiaries.

Gozon-Valdes is also the President of GMA Pictures, Head of Sparkle GMA Artist Center and the President of GMA Network Worldwide. She also serves as trustee of GMA Kapuso Foundation, board member of Regional GMA Network Inc. and GMA Radio and broadcasting affiliates. She helps distribute the network shows to territories in North America, Asia, Africa and Middle East.

In 2024, she was chosen as one of the jurors for the 2024 Asian Academy Creative Awards.

She appeared in movies including Everything About My Wife, Tween Academy: Class of 2012, One True Love and Out of Order. In television, she served as one of the judges in the reality competition shows, Protégé, Sparkle Campus Cutie and Battle of the Judges.

== Personal life ==
Gozon was separated from her former husband, Lito Abrogar, before the annulment of their marriage in 2015. The former couple had two children, Anja and Andy. Her daughter, Anja, graduated magna cum laude from the Ateneo de Manila University with a Management Engineering degree, the same degree she graduated with from the same university.

She married former actor and businessman Shintaro Valdes on December 19, 2016.

=== Health ===
In May 2021, Gozon-Valdes suffered a stroke with symptoms of dizziness, spinning vision and zapping zigzag lights on her right eye. She was hospitalized with a diagnosis of stroke and congenital heart condition known as patent foramen ovale. On June 3, 2021, Gozon-Valdes underwent a successful heart procedure.

== Accolades ==
- Outstanding Lady Producer at the 60th FAMAS Awards
- Rotary Goldwheel Awards (2023–2024)
- Producer of the Year at the 8th EDDYS Award
- One of the Most Influential Filipinos by Tatler Asia (2025)
- Outstanding leader in the entertainment and media industry by Philippines Finest Business Awards and Outstanding Achievers
- Producer of the Year by Philippines Arts of Film and Television Awards (PAFTA)

== See also ==
- List of Colegio San Agustin - Makati alumni
- List of Ateneo de Manila University alumni
- List of University of the Philippines College of Law alumni
- List of Harvard Law School alumni
