= Gilberto Duavit Jr. =

President and CEO of GMA Network

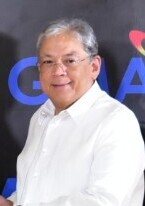
- Duavit in 2024
- Born: October 16, 1963 (age 62)
- Occupations: Businessman; philanthropist; film and television producer; television writer
- Years active: 1991–present
- Title: President and CEO of GMA Network Inc.
- Spouse: Rosanna Lopez (m. 1994)
- Children: 2
- Father: Gilberto Duavit Sr.
- Relatives: Jack Duavit (brother); Jose Roy (grandfather); Mel Lopez (father-in-law); Karl Roy (cousin); Alex Lopez (brother-in-law); Manny Lopez (brother-in-law)

Gilberto "Jimmy" Roy Duavit Jr. (born October 16, 1963) is a Filipino businessman, philanthropist, producer, and writer. He is the president and chief executive officer of GMA Network Inc., one of the largest media networks in the Philippines. Duavit inherited the position from his father, Gilberto "Bibit" Duavit Sr., who was the network's founding chairman. Duavit first became involved with GMA in 1993 as a film producer for the network's production company, GMA Pictures, which was then named Cinemax Studios and later GMA Films. He produced some of the company's most successful films, including José Rizal (1998) and Muro-Ami (1999), both of which won the Metro Manila Film Festival Award for Best Picture successively. After his promotion as the network's vice president in 2000, Duavit became involved in the network's television production, having created the shows Liwanag ng Hatinggabi (1999–2000), Ang Iibigin ay Ikaw (2002–03), and Hanggang Kailan (2004).

Since Duavit assumed the presidency from the network's longtime chairman Felipe Gozon in 2010, he and Gozon, who became CEO, have been attributed for the network's rise as one of the country's leading media networks. Duavit concurrently served as GMA's chief operating officer until 2023. The network had won several Peabody Awards, Asian Television Awards, and the New York Television Festival awards during Duavit's presidency. Duavit replaced the retiring Gozon as the company's CEO from January 2024, while the latter continues to serve as chairman and adviser of the Board of Directors

Duavit is the thirty-seventh-wealthiest person in the Philippines, with a net worth of $440 million, according to Forbes.

== Early life ==
Duavit was born on October 16, 1963, as the second eldest child of GMA Network chairman Gilberto Duavit Sr. (1934–2018) and Vilma Roy Duavit, the daughter of former Philippine Senator Jose Roy (1904–1986). His older sister, Judith Duavit Vasquez, previously served as a GMA board member. His youngest brother, Michael John Duavit, currently serves as a representative for Rizal's 1st district, which he has served for five terms since 2001, a position that his father and second youngest brother, Joel Roy Duavit, also served; Duavit Sr. served as the district's congressman from 1994 to 2001, while Joel served the position for two consecutive terms from 2010 to 2016. Duavit graduated from the University of the Philippines Diliman with a Bachelor of Arts degree in philosophy.

== Career ==
=== Film and television producer (1991–2000) ===
Since 1991, Duavit has served as the president and chief executive officer (CEO) of Film Experts Inc., a magnetic storage and optical disc manufacturer based in Makati.

In 1995, the GMA Network launched Cinemax Studios with Duavit as one of the supervisors. In 1998, Cinemax Studios was renamed to GMA Films in order to avoid confusion with HBO's sister channel Cinemax, which had then recently entered into the Southeast Asian market. Duavit was involved in the production of the studio's first films following the move, Sa Pusod ng Dagat and José Rizal, serving as the two films' producer. Both films were directed by Marilou Diaz-Abaya and were critical and commercial successes. José Rizal won all the 17 awards it was nominated for at the 1998 Metro Manila Film Festival, including Best Picture. The following year, Duavit produced another of Diaz-Abaya's films, Muro-Ami. Muro-Ami grossed ₱66,987,181 at the box office and won 13 awards at the 1999 Metro Manila Film Festival, including Best Picture.

In 1999, Duavit was elected to the GMA Network's board of directors.

After the success of GMA Films in the late 1990s, Duavit ventured into television production at GMA Network. He conceptualized the horror drama series Liwanag ng Hatinggabi, which premiered on December 6, 1999. Duavit was inspired by the concept of magic realism, a style of fiction often associated with Latin American literature. The series was directed by Joel Lamangan and starred Lorna Tolentino, Angelika Dela Cruz, and Victor Neri in the lead roles. It ran for a total of 17 episodes until March 27, 2000.

In 2000, Duavit collaborated again with Lamangan for the melodrama film Deathrow; Lamangan directed, while Duavit served as one of the film's producers. The film was shown at the Cairo International Film Festival in Egypt, the Toronto International Film Festival in Canada, and the Busan International Film Festival in South Korea. It was awarded the Prix Du Meilleur Film Engage au Service d’une Cause (Prize for the Best Committed Film Championing a Cause) at the Brussels Independent Film Festival in Belgium for its depiction of capital punishment on juvenile offenders.

=== GMA Network vice presidency and COO (2000–2010) ===
On December 31, 2000, Duavit became the network's executive vice president and chief operating officer (COO).

As COO, Duavit continued his work on writing television shows for the network. In 2002, he created the drama romance series Ang Iibigin ay Ikaw, starring Christopher de Leon, Alice Dixson, and Richard Gomez. The series ran for a total of 200 episodes between July 8, 2002, and April 11, 2003. It was commercially successful through its run, resulting in GMA Network producing a sequel series, Ang Iibigin ay Ikaw Pa Rin. It replaced the timeslot of Ang Iibigin ay Ikaw and ran for a total of 93 episodes, concluding on August 22, 2003. Duavit served as producer for the sequel series.

In 2004, Duavit created another drama romance series, Hanggang Kailan. Duavit collaborated with writers Jose Javier Reyes and Mark A. Reyes. The series reunited him with Tolentino since Liwanag Ng Hatinggabi and de Leon and Dixson since Ang Iibigin ay Ikaw. It premiered on March 8, 2004, and concluded on August 13, commissioning a total of 95 episodes.

In 2007, the GMA Network announced it would offer its shares to the public from an initial public offering between ₱6.39 billion to ₱7.78 billion. On June 28, the Philippine Stock Exchange approved the network's offering. On July 23, former Ilocos Norte representative Imee Marcos sent a letter to the Securities and Exchange Commission (SEC) contesting her claim of ownership to 28.35 percent of the network's shares held by the Duavit family. The shares were entrusted to Duavit's father, Gilberto Duavit Sr., by Marcos' father, former President Ferdinand Marcos, to whom the senior Duavit served as Assistant Executive Secretary for Social, Political, Legal, and Economic Affairs (1966–1970), Acting Executive Secretary (1969), and Senior Deputy Minister of the Ministry of Youth and Sports Development under. The junior Duavit's lawyer responded to Marcos' claims, saying that Duavit acquired the shares "on his own." Imee Marcos, citing a handwritten note given to her from the senior Duavit in 1983, stated that "Duavit did not own the shares but was merely the representative of a 'silent partner.'" Thereafter, GMA counsel Atty. Gener Asuncion stated that the junior Duavit and his family "are the real and actual owners" and "have concrete proof of their ownership" of the network's shares. According to an official statement by the network, its owner in 1986 (when it was then called the Republic Broadcasting System), Loreto Feliciano Stewart (the wife of its co-founder, Robert "Uncle Bob" Stewart), "sought to recover the shares of the Duavits and asked for an injunction to prevent the registration of the shares in their favor but was rejected by the court. Stewart then gave a notice of dismissal of her complaint and the court dismissed it on November 28, 1986." Asuncion also stated that GMA Network would push through with its scheduled release of listed shares on July 30, following the SEC's approval of the network's registration statement and issuance of a "Securities for Sale" permit.

Under Duavit's leadership as COO in the late 2000s, GMA began securing the media franchise of foreign shows in order for the network to adapt Philippine versions. In August 2007, GMA produced Celebrity Duets, which was the Philippine edition of the British reality singing contest Just the Two of Us, through a licensing agreement with FremantleMedia. GMA purchased the rights to the Idol franchise from FremantleMedia to produce Pinoy Idol, which premiered in September. The franchising rights were previously used by the Associated Broadcasting Company (now the TV5 Network) to produce Philippine Idol. The network also produced Philippine versions of telenovelas that year, most popularly Marimar starring Marian Rivera and Dingdong Dantes, which was based on the 1994 Mexican series of the same name. That year, the network also produced Philippine versions of Zaido: Pulis Pangkalawakan (based on the Japanese tokusatsu Space Sheriff Shaider) and the game shows Kakasa Ka Ba sa Grade 5? (based on the American game show Are You Smarter than a 5th Grader?) and Whammy! Push Your Luck (based on the American game show Second Chance).

=== GMA Network presidency (2010–present) ===
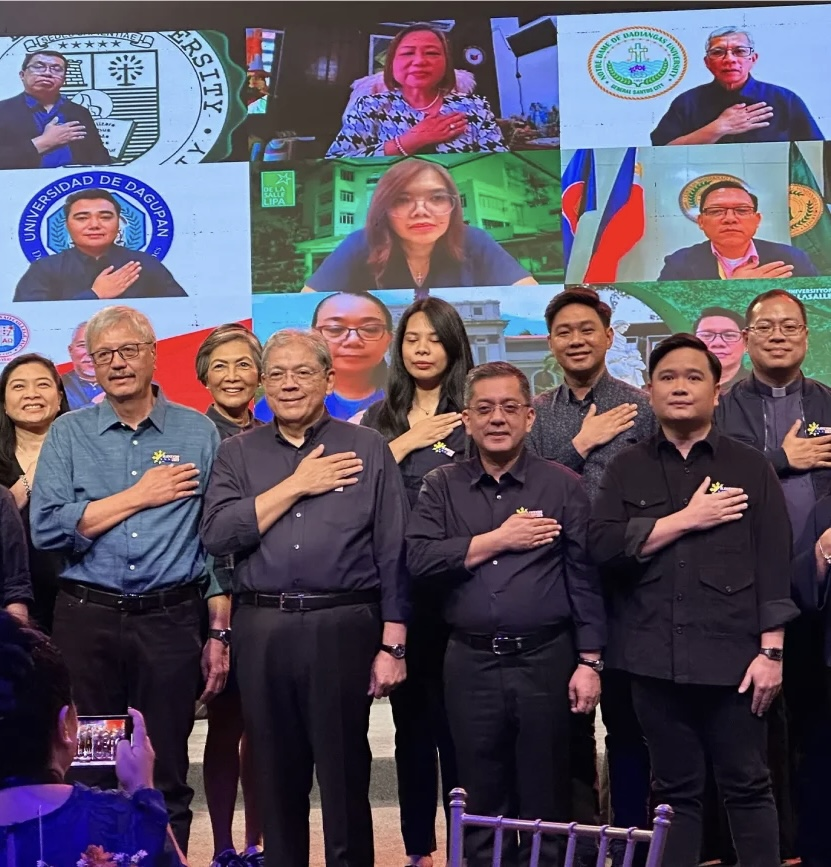
Duavit (second from the left) standing beside COMELEC chair George Garcia during the GMA Network–COMELEC partnership launch on November 11, 2024, ahead of the 2025 midterm election.

In October 2010, Duavit was elected president of the GMA Network by the network's board of directors. Duavit served the role alongside his concurrent role as the company's COO.

Under Duavit's presidency, the network produced the country's first historical drama series, Amaya (2011–12), set during the pre-colonial period of the Philippines.

In February 2012, Duavit led the signing of the network's three-year deal with Fox International Channels. The deal allowed Fox cable channels in the Asia Pacific to air GMA media across the region. GMA media that Fox has re-aired since the deal was signed include the shows Wish Ko Lang! (2002–2020), Pinoy Abroad (2005–06), Encantadia (2005–06), Pinoy Meets World (2006–2009), Super Twins (2007), Babangon Ako't Dudurugin Kita (2008), Dyesebel (2008), Darna (2009–10), Stairway to Heaven (2009), Kaya Kong Abutin ang Langit (2009), and Trudis Liit (2010); and the films José Rizal (1998), My Best Friend's Girlfriend (2008), When I Met U (2009), Yaya and Angelina: The Spoiled Brat Movie (2009), and Temptation Island (2011).

In February 2012, amid reports that business tycoon and TV5 Network chairman Manuel V. Pangilinan had announced a possible merger deal between the two networks, Duavit initially stated that the GMA Network would not be offered to any party with interest in acquiring it. However, he later clarified that the network is sellable but only if the offer price would interest the network's shareholders. He also disclosed that, in 2001, GMA and TV5 (then the Associated Broadcasting Company) had reached a memorandum of understanding for the latter to acquire the former, with a price and sale of the majority having already been reached. However, the agreement was never finalized because of issues encountered by MediaQuest Holdings, the parent company of TV5.

In April 2012, Duavit reported that the network had reached a consolidated revenue of ₱13.083 billion in 2011, despite the loss of ₱2.054 worth of revenues from campaign advertising for the 2010 Philippine general election, the European debt crisis, and the "slow" economic recovery of the U.S. from the Great Recession. He described the network's performance as "fairly competitive", noting a "significant, single-digit increase" in the first quarter of that year than the previous year.

In March 2013, Duavit announced that the GMA Network would depend on internal financing for its estimated ₱1 billion capital expenditure program for the year as per tradition, dispelling appeals that the network should utilize external financing such as fundraisers to source its program. He stated that the network would utilize its program mainly for the establishment of additional stations in rural areas "where close to half of all television viewers reside." He also added that over ₱100 million of the program would be used to fund equipment for the network's coverage of the 2013 Philippine general election.

In August 2015, San Miguel Corporation CEO Ramon S. Ang alleged that GMA executives embezzled his corporation's ₱1 billion down payment for its acquisition of 34 percent of the network's stakes that failed. While Ang filed charges against Gozon and several other GMA executives for syndicated estafa, Duavit was excluded from the charges as he pledged to return his portion of the ₱1 billion.

In July 2016, Duavit's father, Gilberto Duavit Sr., was elected to the board of directors of the GMA Network, serving alongside him. The senior Duavit served as member until his death in December 2018.

In January 2019, it was reported that 88.4 percent of GMA's sales in 2018 were sourced from advertising. As such, GMA fell behind its main competitor in the media industry, ABS-CBN, which generated a total of ₱29.5 billion that year. ABS-CBN had extended its revenue model to other business segments that counterbalanced decreasing advertising revenues, resulting in a large percentage of ABS-CBN's revenue to be attributed to its involvement in the customer experience sector. GMA generated a total revenue of ₱11.1 billion, which was ₱11.4 billion behind ABS-CBN. In response, Duavit and other GMA executives partnered with Pangilinan's PLDT to shift to digital broadcasting. On January 9, GMA and PLDT executives signed a "technology, content, and distribution" agreement for PLDT to assist in the enhancement and innovation of the media network's digital transition.

According to the general information sheet the GMA Network submitted to the Philippine Stock Exchange in 2019, Duavit owns 0.08 percent of the total 4,007,017 shares that the network listed. His shareholdings comprise 4,007,006 common stocks and 12 preferred stocks. The network listed 12.5 billion authorized capital stocks, which is divided into 5 billion common stocks with par value of ₱1 each and 7.5 billion preferred stocks with par value of ₱0.20 each.

Under GMA Network Inc., Duavit also serves as the chairman of GMA Pictures and GMA Worldwide (the network's trans-Pacific broadcaster targeted for Overseas Filipinos); president and CEO of Scenarios Inc. (set production and design), Script2010 Inc. (events management), and RGMA Marketing and Productions Inc. (music production); and president of Citynet Inc. (television production) and MediaMerge Corporation.

In July 2021, GMA Network launched GMA Ventures, which focuses on investing in startups, and named Duavit as the vice chairman of the firm.

In December 2023, GMA chairman and CEO Felipe Gozon announced his retirement from the chief executive role and named Duavit as his successor. The leadership change, which took effect in January 2024, sees Gozon retain his role as the company's chairman and adviser.

=== Philanthropy ===
Duavit is the president and a trustee of the GMA Kapuso Foundation, the network's civic engagement arm.

He is a trustee of the Guronasyon Foundation Inc., an organization based in Binangonan, Rizal, to support teachers from the province. He is also a board adviser of the HERO Foundation.

== Personal life ==
Duavit married Rosanna Lopez, daughter of former Manila mayor Mel Lopez, on November 19, 1994. They currently reside in Quezon City with their twin sons, born in 2001.

Through his mother's side, he is cousins with singer Kevin Roy, lead singer of the rock band Razorback, as well as Karl Roy, lead singer of the bands P.O.T. and Kapatid, who died on March 13, 2012, from pulmonary edema.

== Filmography ==
Year	Title	Credits
1998	My Guardian Debil	Executive Producer
1998	Sa Pusod ng Dagat	Producer
1998	José Rizal	Producer
1999	Muro-Ami	Producer
1999–2000	Liwanag ng Hatinggabi	Developer, Executive Producer
2000	Deathrow	Producer
2002–03	Ang Iibigin ay Ikaw	Creator
2003	Ang Iibigin ay Ikaw Pa Rin	Producer
2004	Hanggang Kailan	Creator, Producer
2009	Manila Skies	Associate Producer

== Awards and recognitions ==
Duavit has won the Metro Manila Film Festival Award for Best Picture twice consecutively for José Rizal (1998) and Muro-Ami (1999), as producer of both films.

== See also ==
- Carlo Katigbak – president and CEO of ABS-CBN, GMA Network's main competitor

Business positions
Preceded by Felipe Gozon	President, GMA Network; 2010–present	Succeeded by Incumbent
