= DXND =

DXND may refer to:

- DXND-AM, an AM radio station broadcasting in Kidapawan, branded as Radyo Bida
- DXND-FM, an FM radio station broadcasting in Iligan, branded as Juander Radyo
