= Buena Mano Balita =

- Genre: News broadcasting
- Presented by: Alan Domingo; Yorie Darig; Cheryl Pelayo-Dacua; Bobby Nalzaro†; Mark Anthony Bautista; Dan delos Angeles
- Country of origin: Philippines
- Original language: Cebuano

Production
- Running time: 30-45 minutes
- Production company: GMA News and Public Affairs

Original release
- Network: GMA Cebu
- Release: October 8, 2007 – April 24, 2015

Related
- GMA Regional TV Live!

Buena Mano Balita is a Philippine television news broadcasting program broadcast by GMA Cebu. It premiered on October 8, 2007. The newscast concluded on April 24, 2015.

== Overview ==
It is composed of various fun and informative segments that will arm the viewers with information and trivia which will help them make the “right” choices for the day. It is set to jumpstart Cebu mornings with just the right dose of news, weather update, entertainment news and information. Buena Mano Balita is currently the no.1 morning entertainment and news show, gathering a TV Rating of 12.5% this September 2012. While its competitor in ABS-CBN only received 5.8%.

Without saying goodbyes, it had their final broadcast for more than 7 years last April 24, 2015, as part of the streamlining of regional operations of GMA after the broadcast, the hosts and the on-air staff of BMB were retrenched by the network's management.

GMA Cebu would not have a regional morning newscast until 5 years later, with the launch of GMA Regional TV Live! on April 20, 2020.

== Final hosts ==
- Alan Domingo
- Yuri Deldig
- Cheryl Pelayo-Dacua
- Bobby Nalzaro†
- Mark Anthony Bautista
- Fr. Dan delos Angeles
