= DYSS-AM =

Radio station in Cebu City, Philippines

Super Radyo Cebu (DYSS)
- Cebu City; Philippines
- Broadcast area: Central Visayas and surrounding areas
- Frequency: 999 kHz
- Branding: GMA Super Radyo DYSS 999

Programming
- Languages: Cebuano, Filipino
- Format: News, Public Affairs, Talk, Drama
- Network: Super Radyo

Ownership
- Owner: GMA Network Inc.
- Sister stations: Barangay LS 99.5; GMA 7 Cebu; GTV 27 Cebu

History
- First air date: July 4, 1957
- Former frequencies: 1560 kHz (1957–1965); 1020 kHz (1965–1978)
- Call sign meaning: Super Radyo Sugbu

Technical information
- Licensing authority: NTC
- Power: 10,000 watts

Links
- Website: www.gmanetwork.com

DYSS (pronounced DY-double-S; 999 AM) Super Radyo is a radio station owned and operated by GMA Network. The station's studio is located at the GMA Skyview Complex, Nivel Hills, Apas, Cebu City, while its transmitter is located at Alumnos, Brgy. Mambaling, Cebu City.

At present, DYSS is considered one of the top AM stations in Metro Cebu and Central Visayas.

== History ==
Super Radyo DYSS Cebu main logo used from 2002 until 2014.

DYSS commenced radio operations on July 4, 1957. Initially owned by Loreto F. de Hemedes Inc. through its Manila affiliate DZBB, the station later came under the Republic Broadcasting System, founded by Robert "Uncle Bob" Stewart. Its first studios were located in the Fortunata Building at the corner of Magallanes and Lapu-lapu Streets. From there, it broadcast via a 167-foot vertical antenna and a 1-kilowatt BC Gates transmitter situated in Mambaling Seaside, initially operating on the 1560 kHz frequency.

Building on radio success, the company launched DYSS-TV Channel 7 in February 1962 with the branding of RBS-7 Cebu (now known as GMA-7 Cebu). In September 1972, Martial Law (Proclamation 1081) forced DYSS off the air. Two years later, RBS assets were sold to Gilberto Duavit Sr., Menardo Jimenez, and Felipe Gozon due to new media ownership laws, and DYSS returned as music station “Dobol S.” In November 1978, following the Philippine adoption of the 9 kHz AM spacing standard (Geneva Plan), DYSS moved to 999 kHz.

On July 17, 1989, DYSS switched to a news and public service format, reverting to its call letters. In 1990, it moved to the GMA Skyview Complex in Nivel Hills with sister stations DYSS-TV and DYRT. On January 4, 1999, DYSS and other AM stations adopted the Super Radyo brand. The station then began airing GMA Cebu's Balitang Bisdak at 6:00 pm (slightly delayed) and GMA's flagship 24 Oras at 6:30 pm.

In 2017, RGMA radio stations nationwide launched new logos, coinciding with DZBB's first jingle and the relaunch of Dobol B TV on GMA News TV (now GTV).

== Notable anchors ==
- Bobby Nalzaro (Deceased)
