= DYHY =

Radio station in Puerto Princesa, Philippines

Coordinates: 9.77037°N 118.75274°E

Barangay LS Palawan (DYHY)
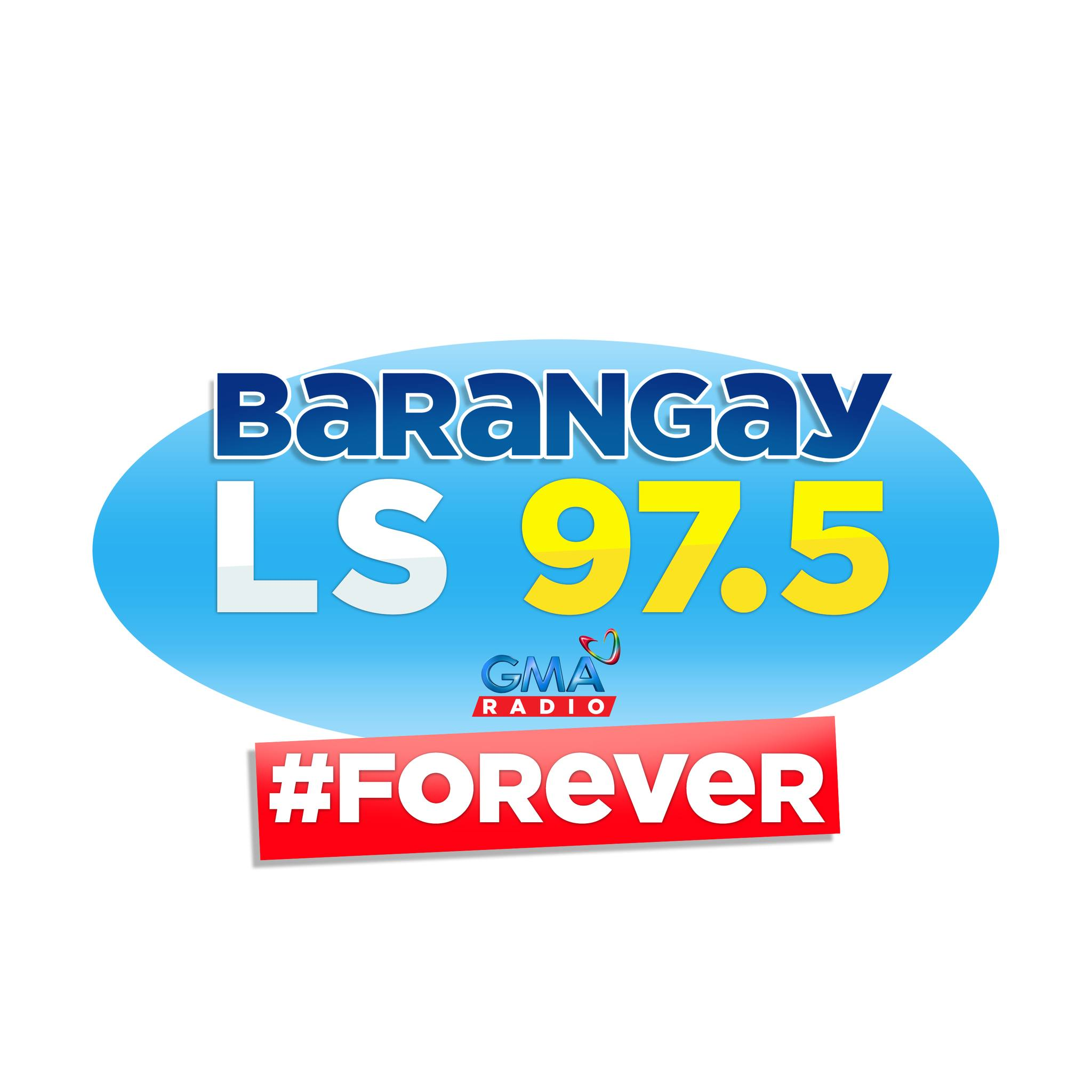
- Puerto Princesa; Philippines
- Broadcast area: Palawan
- Frequency: 97.5 MHz
- Branding: Barangay LS 97.5

Programming
- Language: Filipino
- Format: Contemporary MOR, OPM
- Network: Barangay LS

Ownership
- Owner: GMA Network Inc.
- Sister stations: DYSP Super Radyo; GMA TV-12 Puerto Princesa; GTV 27 Puerto Princesa

History
- First air date: February 1998
- Former call signs: DWRG (1998–2010)
- Former names: Campus Radio (1998–2014)

Technical information
- Licensing authority: NTC
- Power: 10,000 watts
- ERP: 15,000 watts

Links
- Website: www.gmanetwork.com

DYHY (97.5 FM), broadcasting as Barangay LS 97.5, is a radio station owned and operated by GMA Network Inc. Its studios and transmitter are located along Solid Road, Brgy. San Manuel, Puerto Princesa.

Barangay FM 97.5 logo from 2023 to 2026

The station was launched in 1998 as Campus Radio before rebranding to Barangay FM in 2014. On April 6, 2026, it adopted the Barangay LS branding, after the flagship FM station in Metro Manila.
