= Liwanag ng Hatinggabi =

Philippine television drama series

- Also known as: Light of Midnight
- Genre: Horror drama
- Developed by: Jimmy Duavit; Jun Lana
- Directed by: Joel Lamangan
- Starring: Lorna Tolentino; Angelika Dela Cruz; Victor Neri
- Theme music composer: Jun Lana
- Opening theme: "Liwanag ng Hatinggabi" by Angelika dela Cruz
- Country of origin: Philippines
- Original language: Tagalog
- No. of episodes: 17

Production
- Executive producer: Jimmy Duavit
- Camera setup: Multiple-camera setup
- Running time: 42 minutes
- Production company: GMA Entertainment TV

Original release
- Network: GMA Network
- Release: December 6, 1999 – March 27, 2000

Liwanag ng Hatinggabi (trans. / international title: Light of Midnight) is a Philippine television drama horror series broadcast by GMA Network. The series is the first installment of GMA Mini-Series. Directed by Joel Lamangan, it stars Lorna Tolentino, Angelika Dela Cruz and Victor Neri. It premiered on December 6, 1999. The series concluded on March 27, 2000, with a total of 17 episodes.

== Cast and characters ==
Lead cast

- Lorna Tolentino as Amanda / Milagros
- Angelika Dela Cruz as Luna
- Victor Neri as Gabriel / Anton

Supporting cast

- Boots Anson-Roa as Cedes
- Raymond Bagatsing as Ramon
- Glydel Mercado as Adela
- Mark Gil as Felipe
- Chin Chin Gutierrez as Magda
- Ace Espinosa as Martin
- Gerald Madrid
- Krista Ranillo
- Carmi Martin
- Phillip Salvador
- Ana Capri as Elena
- Ronnie Lazaro as Emong
- Maureen Larrazabal
- Ramil Rodriguez as Ising
- Lora Luna as Ason
- Jim Pebangco as Pilo
- Florante Tagulo as Samuel
- Celina Cortez as Sylvia

Guest cast

- Clarissa Tiongco as younger Luna
