= DYSP =

Radio station in Puerto Princesa, Philippines

Super Radyo Palawan (DYSP)
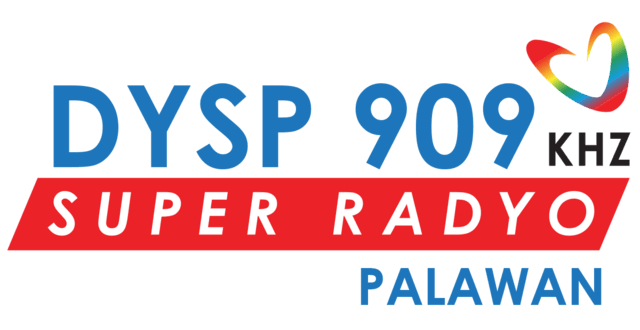
- Puerto Princesa; Philippines
- Broadcast area: Palawan
- Frequency: 909 kHz
- Branding: GMA Super Radyo DYSP 909

Programming
- Language: Filipino
- Format: News, Public Affairs, Talk
- Network: Super Radyo

Ownership
- Owner: GMA Network Inc.
- Sister stations: Barangay LS 97.5; GMA TV-12 Puerto Princesa; GTV 27 Puerto Princesa

History
- First air date: February 1998
- Call sign meaning: Super Radyo Palawan

Technical information
- Licensing authority: NTC
- Power: 10,000 watts

DYSP (909 AM) Super Radyo is a radio station owned and operated by GMA Network. The station's studio is located along Solid Rd., Brgy. San Manuel, Puerto Princesa. At present, DYSP is one of the top AM stations in the province.
