= DYFE =

Radio station in Tacloban, Philippines

- Tacloban; Philippines
- Broadcast area: Northern Leyte, southern Samar
- Frequency: 97.5 MHz
- Branding: 97.5 DYFE

Programming
- Languages: Waray, Filipino, English, Hokkien (Chinese programs)
- Format: Christian Radio

Ownership
- Owner: Far East Broadcasting Company

History
- First air date: March 1, 1995 (as Campus Radio); May 22, 2018 (as DYFE)
- Former call signs: DYOU (1995–2010)
- Call sign meaning: Far East

Technical information
- Licensing authority: NTC
- Power: 1,000 watts
- ERP: 5,000 watts

Links
- Website: http://dyfe.febc.ph/

DYFE (97.5 FM) is a non-commercial radio station owned and operated by the Far East Broadcasting Company. Its studio and transmitter are located at Unit 4A, 4th floor, Catjoy Building, P. Burgos St., Tacloban.

The frequency was formerly owned by Radio GMA under the brand Campus Radio. On March 31, 2010, it closed down due to lack of advertisers' support and financial problems. A few years later, it was used by FEBC for emergency broadcasts. On May 22, 2018, it was inaugurated as DYFE.
