= DYRT =

Radio station in Cebu City, Philippines

Barangay LS Cebu (DYRT)
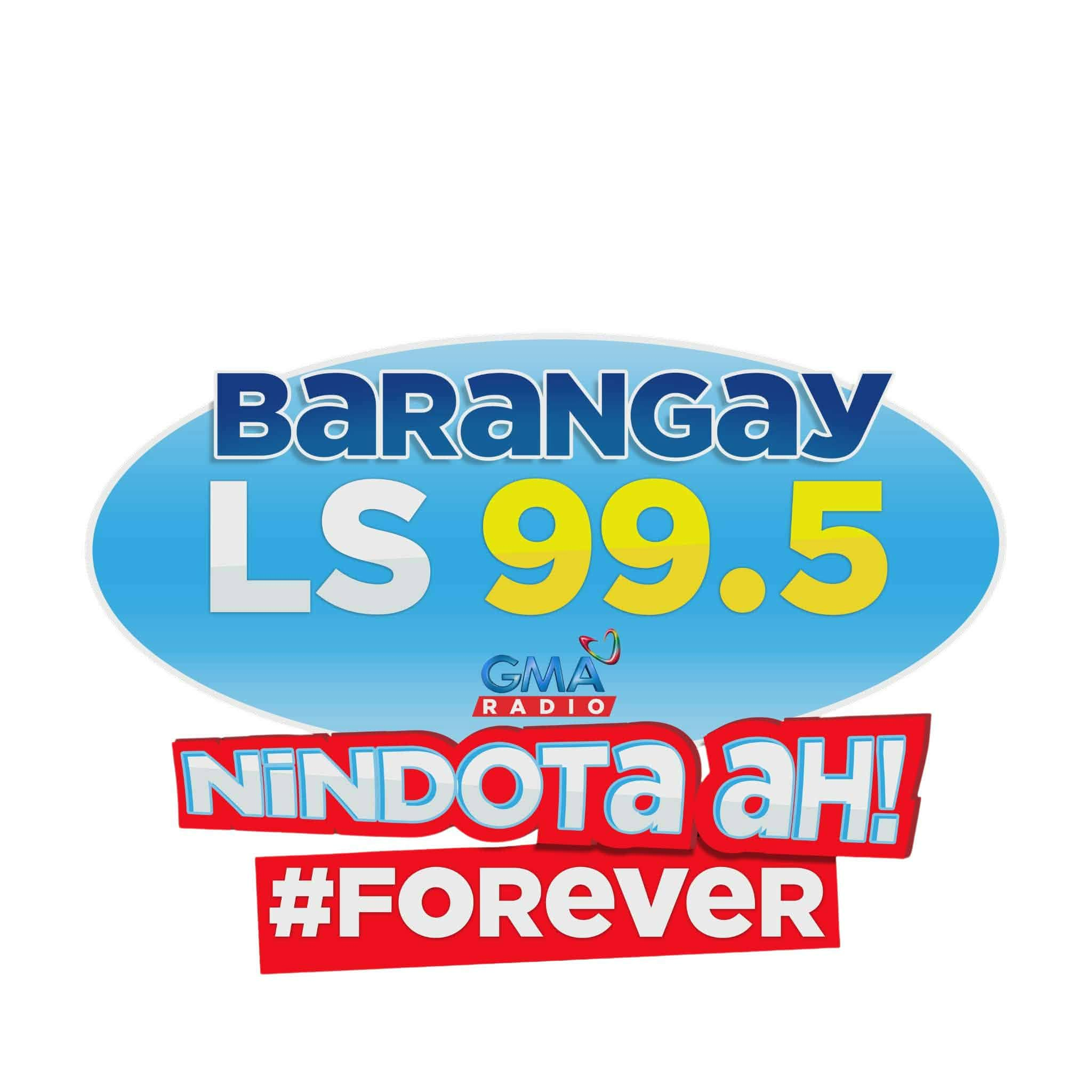
- Cebu City; Philippines
- Broadcast area: Metro Cebu and surrounding areas
- Frequency: 99.5 MHz (FM Stereo)
- Branding: Barangay LS 99.5

Programming
- Languages: Cebuano, Filipino
- Format: Contemporary MOR, OPM
- Network: Barangay LS

Ownership
- Owner: GMA Network Inc.
- Sister stations: DYSS Super Radyo; GMA TV-7 Cebu; GTV 27 Cebu

History
- First air date: 1978
- Former call signs: DYLS (1978–1979)
- Former names: LS 97.1 (1978–1979); Double 9.5 RT (1980–1995); Campus Radio (1995–1997); 99.5 RT (1997–2014)
- Former frequencies: 97.1 MHz (1978–1979)
- Call sign meaning: Romantic Touch (former branding)

Technical information
- Licensing authority: NTC
- Class: A/B/C/D/E
- Power: 25,000 watts
- ERP: 75,000 watts

Links
- Webcast: Listen Live
- Website: www.gmanetwork.com

DYRT (99.5 FM), on-air as Barangay LS 99.5, is a radio station owned and operated by GMA Network Inc. The station's studio is located at GMA Skyview Complex, Nivel Hills, Apas, Cebu City, while its transmitter is located at Mt. Bonbon, Cebu City.

== History ==
=== 1978-1979: DYLS ===
The station was established in 1978 on 97.1 MHz under the call letters DYLS. It was the second oldest regional FM station under the auspices of the Republic Broadcasting System after DXSS in Davao, which started operations in 1977. In 1979, the station went off the air.

The frequency was acquired by AMCARA Broadcasting Network, in which it went on air in 1992.

=== 1980-1995: Double 9.5 RT ===
On February 4, 1980, the station returned to air, this time on 99.5 MHz under the call letters DYRT. It carried the branding Double 9.5 RT: The Romantic Touch, with the slogan "The Beautiful Music Station of Cebu". Back then, its studio and transmitter were located at the 10/F Luym Bldg. along Plaridel cor. Juan Luna St. (now Osmeña Blvd.). The station aired easy listening music and news updates every top of the hour, and English was used as its medium. In 1990, DYRT and its sister station GMA-7 Cebu moved to its current home in GMA Skyview Complex in Nivel Hills, Apas, and switched to a Top 40 format.

=== 1995-2014: Campus Radio/99.5 RT ===
On March 1, 1995, following the launch of RGMA done by Mike Enriquez, the station was rebranded as Campus Radio 99.5 RT, with the slogan "Forever!". Two years later, when Bobby Nalzaro took over the operations of GMA Cebu, the station rebranded as 99.5 RT and changed its slogan to "Nindota-Ah!", which was later adapted by several RGMA FM stations in Mindanao in 1998. At the same time, it was reformatted to a mass-based station and changed its medium to Cebuano. From 2013 to 2018, as conducted by Nielsen Radio Audience Measurement, 99.5 RT Cebu was the dominant overall Number 1 Radio Station in Cebu.

=== 2014-present: Barangay ===
Barangay RT logo from 2023 to 2026

On February 17, 2014, as part of RGMA's brand unifying, the station was rebranded as Barangay RT 99.5 and carried-over the slogan "Isang Bansa, Isang Barangay" with "Nindota Ah" being used as secondary slogan. Since then, it began simulcasting a handful of programs from its Manila station. On April 22, 2019, the station began simulcasting DYSS Super Radyo's program Bobby Nalzaro On Board: Saksi until December 2021.

Following the effects of Typhoon Rai (Odette) in Cebu, Bohol and Leyte on December 16, 2021, the station scaled down its programming. It only returned to its regular programming a few weeks later after power was restored in Brgy. Apas.

On April 5, 2026, Barangay RT is among the stations which adopted the Barangay LS branding from its flagship station, effectively dropping the "RT" from the branding, and re-adapted its former slogan "Nindota Ah!" as its secondary slogan.
