= Balitang Bisdak =

Philippine television news show

- Title card since 2026
- Also known as: 24 Oras Central Visayas
- Genre: News broadcasting
- Directed by: Davis Abella
- Presented by: Lou-Anne Mae Rondina
- Narrated by: Lou-Anne Mae Rondina; Chelo Vallena; Al Torres (1999-2025); Weng dela Peña (since 2025)
- Country of origin: Philippines
- Original language: Cebuano

Production
- Executive producers: Chelo Vallena; Suzzane Alueta; Mark Regie Abella
- Production locations: GMA Complex, Nivel Hills, Apas, Cebu City
- Camera setup: Multiple-camera setup
- Running time: 30 minutes
- Production companies: GMA Regional TV; GMA News

Original release
- Network: GMA 7 Cebu
- Release: October 4, 1999 – present

Balitang Bisdak (also known as GMA Regional TV Balitang Bisdak; transl. Bisdak News) is a Philippine television news broadcasting show broadcast by GMA Cebu. Originally anchored by Bobby Nalzaro, it premiered on October 4, 1999, replacing News at Seven Cebu. Lou-Anne Mae Rondina currently serves as the anchor.

== Overview ==
Broadcast from GMA TV Cebu, Balitang Bisdak delivers news and features across Central and Eastern Visayas. Reports are provided by GMA's regional news teams, with Cebuano and Waray as common languages.

It airs weekdays from 5:10–5:40 PM on GMA Cebu (TV-7), and via relay stations in Tacloban, Bohol, Dumaguete, Calbayog, Borongan, and Ormoc. A delayed radio broadcast airs at 6:00 PM on DYSS 999 AM.

National replays aired Tuesdays at 11:50 PM on GTV’s “Regional TV Strip” (May 2020–July 2021), and the show is also available worldwide via GMA News TV International.

== History ==
=== 1999-2014: As Balitang Bisdak ===
The newscast premiered on Channel 7 Cebu on October 4, 1999, with Bobby Nalzaro as its solo anchor after joining GMA Cebu in 1997. Atty. Rose Versoza joined him in 2009 and remained until 2015.

In July 2013, to strengthen its commitment to delivering credible and comprehensive regional news, the newscast began airing internationally on GMA News TV International, alongside Balitang Amianan (now One North Central Luzon) and One Mindanao.

=== 2014-2016: As 24 Oras Central Visayas ===
Balitang Bisdak ended its 15-year run on November 7, 2014, and rebranded as 24 Oras Central Visayas starting November 10.

=== 2016-Present: As GMA Regional TV Balitang Bisdak ===
However, on February 1, 2016, 24 Oras Central Visayas reverted to the Balitang Bisdak branding after over a year, mirroring GMA Dagupan’s return to Balitang Amianan.

On November 13, 2017, Balitang Bisdak was relaunched in the style of sister newscasts Balitang Amianan and One Mindanao, expanding its reach across Central and Eastern Visayas via simulcast on relay stations in Tacloban, Bohol, and Ormoc. Veteran correspondent Alan Domingo joined Bobby Nalzaro and Cecille Quibod-Castro as co-anchor.

On July 29, 2019, following the launch of GMA Regional TV Weekend News, Balitang Bisdak unveiled updated graphics, a new logo, and opening titles featuring scenes from its coverage areas. It also introduced a more relaxed studio setup with couches, aiming to create a living room-like atmosphere that fosters closer connection with viewers. Additionally, the show began welcoming live studio audiences every Friday.

On June 29, 2020, GMA Regional TV suspended Cebu’s program production due to the worsening COVID-19 crisis in Cebu City, merging it with GMA Iloilo’s One Western Visayas. Cebuano language reports were transmitted to Iloilo and broadcast across the Visayas. During this period, the program operated under the unified title One Western Visayas–Balitang Bisdak. During the merger, the program adopted a multilingual format, using Filipino in studio presentations and airing Hiligaynon, Cebuano, and Waray reports, marking the return of such a format since One Mindanao. Bobby Nalzaro returned as co-anchor on July 2. The merger ended on July 10, with the Cebu-based program resuming in Cebuano on Juy 13.

On May 3, 2021, the program expanded its coverage to include Samar, debuting a new opening billboard with the update.

From March 17 to 21, 2022, the newscast paid tribute to anchor Bobby Nalzaro, who died at 58, leaving Domingo and Quibod-Castro as anchors. Lou-Anne Mae Rondina joined the team on May 2, 2022, and remained until July 28, 2023, before transferring to GMA Regional TV Live! the following week.

On January 26, 2024, Cecile Quibod-Castro made her final appearance on the newscast after nearly two decades. She continued anchoring on Regional TV News, which later became a segment on Balitanghali, leaving Domingo as the sole main anchor.

On September 30, 2024, Lou-Anne Mae Rondina replaced Domingo as anchor, coinciding with another revamp of the newscast.

On April 1, 2025, Cecille Quibod-Castro returned to the newscast as the sole main anchor, succeeding Lou-Anne Mae Rondina.

On September 29, 2025, the news program became available via livestream on GMA Regional TV's social media accounts, alongside One Mindanao, One North Central Luzon, and One Western Visayas.

However, on June 29, 2026, to conform with the newest regional newscast, Ratsada Balita, the second-to-last words of GMA Regional TV newscasts, including Balitang Bisdak, is changed to red, signaling the end of the integrated era. Likewise, Lou-Anne Mae Rondina replaces Cecille Quibod-Castro as its anchor once more, and the GMA News intro is used.

== Personalities ==
=== Main anchor ===
- Lou-Anne Mae Rondina (Co-anchor; 2022-23 and Sole main anchor; 2024-25, since 2026)

=== Main correspondents ===
- Alan Domingo
- Nikko Sereno
- Fe Marie Dumaboc
- Orchids Lapingcao (Supervising Producer)

=== Former anchors and correspondents ===
- Bobby Nalzaro^{†} (Main anchor; 1999–2022)
- Cecille Quibod-Castro (co-anchor; 2005-2022 and main anchor; 2022-2024, 2025-2026)
- Atty. Rose Versoza (Co-anchor; 2009-15)
- Monching Auxtero
- Ana Desamparado
- Ara Labra
- Jun Veliganio
- Mark Anthony Bautista
- Bexmae Jumao-as
- Greggy Magdadaro
- Ching Pelayo
- Lalaine Go
- Aynee Triumfante
- Vic Serna
- Ademar Ochotorena
- Chelo Vallena
- Mark Regie Abella (Supervising Producer)
- Chona Carreon (Senior correspondent)
- Lian Sinculan
- Yuri Deldig a.k.a. Yuri Richards^{†} (House Attack segment presenter)
- Victor Camion (Dumaguete correspondent)
- Leo Udtohan (Bohol correspondent)
- Ronnie Roa (Leyte correspondent)

== Segments ==
- Alerto (Police News)
- Game On! (Sports News)
- Flash Report (Breaking News)
- Huli Cam (Reports on footages in CCTV)
- Newsstand (Other Reports)
- Ronda Waray (Other Reports in Eastern Visayas)
- Serbisyong Puso (Public Service)
- Showbits (Entertainment News)
- GMA Regional TV Presents (Special Reports)
- Extra
- Extra Income (Money News)
- Bida Ka
- Hanepbuhay
- Bisdak Bae
- Good News
- Reklamo, Ipa-Bisdak mo! (Complaint News)
- Balitang Barangay (Community News)
- Batang Bisdak (Kiddie News)
- Manglaag Ta! (Travel News)
- Lami Syah!/Food Trip (Food News)
- Lahi Rah (Viral News)
- Hayop sa Balita (Animal News)
- GMA Weather (Weather News)
- #SpreadKindness
- 'Sa Maaan? (Questions)
- Kwento ng Pilipino (Story News)
