= Barangay Love Stories =

Philippine radio drama program

- Genre: Drama
- Country of origin: Philippines
- Language: Tagalog
- Home station: Barangay LS 97.1
- Hosted by: Papa Dudut
- Recording studio: GMA Network Studio Annex, Quezon City
- Original release: September 2009 – present
- Opening theme: "Alaala" by Jimi Jurado, Jopper Ril, and Jaybee Ramos

Barangay Love Stories is a Philippine radio drama anthology and podcast broadcast by Barangay LS 97.1. Hosted by Papa Dudut, it premiered in September 2009.

Barangay Love Stories is streaming online on YouTube, Apple Podcasts and Spotify. From 2020 to 2022, it also aired on Super Radyo DZBB.

== Premise and format ==
Each episode features a story based on the real-life experiences relating to love, heartbreak and hope.

The program is usually aired live from Barangay LS studios at the GMA Network Studio Annex in Quezon City. It occasionally broadcasts on remote setups, such as the "Barangay Live Studios" since 2025.

== Television adaptation ==
In 2026, GMA Network announced a television series based on Barangay Love Stories, produced by GMA Public Affairs. Papa Dudut serves as a host. It premiered on September 12, 2026, on the network's Sabado Star Power sa Hapon line up. According to AGB Nielsen Philippines' Nationwide Urban Television Audience Measurement People in television homes, the pilot episode of the television adaptation earned a 3.9% rating. The series is also streaming online on YouTube.

== Accolades ==
Accolades received by Barangay Love Stories
Year	Award	Category	Recipient	Result	Ref.
2025	Spotify	Spotify Creator Milestone Award	Barangay Love Stories	Won	
2025	6th Alta Media Icon Awards	Best Podcast of the Year	Papa Dudut	Won	
2025	Spotify Wrapped Awards	Top Love & Relationship Podcast	Barangay Love Stories	Won	
2025	Spotify Wrapped Awards	Top Podcast in the Philippines	Barangay Love Stories	Won	
