= DYRU =

Radio station in Kalibo, Philippines

Barangay RU Super Radyo (DYRU)
- Kalibo; Philippines
- Broadcast area: Aklan, parts of Antique and Capiz
- Frequency: 92.9 MHz
- Branding: Barangay RU 92.9 Super Radyo

Programming
- Languages: Akeanon, Filipino
- Format: Contemporary MOR, News, Talk
- Network: Super Radyo; Barangay FM

Ownership
- Owner: GMA Network Inc.
- Sister stations: GMA TV-2 Kalibo

History
- First air date: 1995
- Former names: Campus Radio (1995-March 7, 1997); Bisig Bayan (March 8, 1997-1999)

Technical information
- Licensing authority: NTC
- Power: 5,000 watts

Links
- Webcast: Barangay RU 92.9 YouTube Channel

DYRU (92.9 FM), broadcasting as Barangay RU 92.9 Super Radyo, is a radio station owned and operated by GMA Network Inc. The station's studio and transmitter are located at Torres-Oliva Bldg., Roxas Ave. Ext., Brgy. Andagao, Kalibo. At present, Barangay RU is considered one of the top stations in the province.

== History ==
The station began its operations in 1995 as Campus Radio with a mass-based format. On March 8, 1997, it rebranded as Bisig Bayan and switched to a news and talk format. Among its notable programs are Ieitsahan, Pasipeat and Parke de Libertad. On 1999, it rebranded as Super Radyo following the update of GMA's logo. On February 17, 2014, as part of the brand unification among RGMA's FM stations, the station rebranded as Barangay 92.9 Super Radyo and added music to its programming. It also airs a live audio hookup of GMA's flagship newscast 24 Oras via satellite.
