= GMA Kapuso Foundation =

Socio-civic organization in the Philippines

GMA Kapuso Foundation Inc.
- GMA Kapuso Foundation logo from 2012 to 2024
- Founded: 1991 (as Bisig Bayan Foundation)
- Founder: Menardo Jimenez (Bisig Bayan Foundation); Mel Tiangco (GMA Kapuso Foundation)
- Type: Charitable organization
- Purpose: Health, Education, Disaster relief, Values Formation
- Location(s): GMA Network Center; GMA Network Drive cor. Samar Street; Diliman, Quezon City 1103; Philippines
- Coordinates: 14°38′1.32″N 121°2′36.60″E
- Region served: Philippines
- Owner: GMA Network Inc.
- Key people: Felipe Gozon, Chairman; Gilberto Duavit Jr., President; Felipe S. Yalong, Treasurer; Roberto O. Parel, Secretary; Luz Annalee O. Escudero-Catibog, EVP and COO; Mel Tiangco, Founder and Ambassador
- Website: www.gmanetwork.com/kapusofoundation

GMA Kapuso Foundation Inc. (formerly Bisig Bayan Foundation and GMA Foundation) is a socio-civic organization organized by GMA Network Inc. to facilitate social programs and outreach to the public.

Implemented singly or in partnership with other agencies, the foundation focuses on helping and supporting impoverished families and children, calamity victims, prisoners and ex-prisoners, and aspiring singers and songwriters, including dependents of GMA employees.

== Projects ==
=== Health ===
- Bisig Bayan Medical Assistance (BB)
- Kalusugan Karavan (KK)

=== Education ===
- Kapuso School Development (KSD) Project
- Unang Hakbang sa Kinabukasan (UHSK)

=== Disaster Relief ===
- Operation Bayanihan (OpsBay)
- Silong Kapuso

=== Values Formation ===
- Kapuso ng Kalikasan (KNK) Project
- Sagip Dugtong Buhay
- Give-A-Gift: Alay sa Batang Pinoy
- Give-A-Gift: Feed a Child
- Give-A-Gift: Surgical Mission
- Kapuso Tulay Para sa Kaunlaran
- Ngiting Kapuso
- Operation Bukol

== Awards ==
=== 53rd Anvil Awards ===
- Silver Anvil Award (Public Relations Tools – Publications category):

‘20 Years of Serbisyong Totoo: The GMA Kapuso Foundation, Inc. 2016 Annual Report’

- Silver Anvil Award (Public Relations Tools: Multimedia/Digital Online Video/Online News):

‘Kapuso Para sa Kawal Project,’ Layong Matulungan ang mga Sundalong Lumalaban sa Marawi

- Silver Anvil Award (Public Relations Tools: Multimedia/Digital Online Video/Online News):

Rebuild Marawi MTV

=== 52nd Anvil Awards ===
- Silver Anvil Award (Public Relations Tools – Publications category):

Empowering the Youth: The GMA Kapuso Foundation, Inc. 2015 Annual Report

=== 34th Agora Awards ===
- Outstanding Achievement In Advocacy Marketing

GMA Kapuso Foundation, Inc.

=== Philippine Quill Awards ===
- Merit Award

The Worst of Times. The Best of Times: The GMA Kapuso Foundation, Inc. 2009 Annual Report

=== 45th Anvil Awards ===
- Anvil Award of Excellence Ryu Watanabe

GMA Kapuso Foundation, Inc. Annual Report
