= DWQL =

Radio station in Lucena, Philippines

Barangay LS Lucena (DWQL)
- Lucena; Philippines
- Broadcast area: Quezon and surrounding areas
- Frequency: 91.1 MHz
- RDS: BRGY911
- Branding: Barangay LS 91.1

Programming
- Language: Filipino
- Format: Contemporary MOR, OPM
- Network: Barangay LS

Ownership
- Owner: GMA Network Inc.

History
- First air date: August 1998
- Former names: Campus Radio (1998-2014)
- Call sign meaning: Inverted as Lucena, Quezon

Technical information
- Licensing authority: NTC
- Power: 10,000 watts
- ERP: 20,000 watts
- Transmitter coordinates: 13°55′58″N 121°36′49″E

Links
- Webcast: Official Website

DWQL (91.1 FM), on-air as Barangay LS 91.1, is a radio station owned and operated by GMA Network. The station's studio and transmitter are located at the 3rd. Floor, Ancon Bldg., Merchant St., Lucena.

== Notable people ==
=== Former ===
- Papa Piolo (now Papa Dudut)
