= DWLS =

Radio station in Metro Manila, Philippines

Barangay LS Manila (DWLS)
- Logo since 2023
- Quezon City; Philippines
- Broadcast area: Mega Manila and surrounding areas
- Frequency: 97.1 MHz
- RDS: BRGY LS
- Branding: Barangay LS 97.1

Programming
- Language: Filipino
- Format: Contemporary MOR, OPM
- Network: Barangay LS

Ownership
- Owner: GMA Network Inc.
- Sister stations: Super Radyo DZBB 594; GMA 7; GTV 27

History
- First air date: July 1976
- Former names: WLS (1976–1988); The Giant (1988–1992); Campus Radio (1992-2007)
- Call sign meaning: Loreto Stewart (wife of Robert "Uncle Bob" Stewart, founder of GMA Network)

Technical information
- Licensing authority: NTC
- Class: C/D/E
- Power: 25,000 watts
- ERP: 75,000 watts
- Transmitter coordinates: 14°40′N 121°03′E

Links
- Webcast: Listen Live
- Website: www.gmanetwork.com/radio/dwls

DWLS (97.1 FM), broadcasting as Barangay LS 97.1, is a radio station owned and operated by GMA Network. It serves as the flagship station of Barangay LS. The station's studio is located at the 3rd floor of GMA Network Studio Annex, GMA Network Drive corner Samar Avenue, Diliman, Quezon City, and its transmitters are located at GMA Tower of Power, Charles Conrad Street, Barangay Culiat, Tandang Sora, Quezon City.

Barangay LS currently holds its position as the top FM radio station in Metro Manila, according to the Nielsen Radio Audience Measurement survey conducted in the month of April 2026.

== History ==
=== 1976–1992: WLS FM/The Giant ===
The station first went on air in July 1976 as 97.1 WLS FM, airing adult standards and jazz. In 1981, it switched to an Adult Top 40 format with the slogan "The Best Music", featuring hourly Beatles music on weekday mornings, a tradition later adopted by 100.3 RJFM. In November 1988, after completing GMA's Tower of Power, it rebranded as The Giant 97.1 WLS FM.

=== 1992–2007: Campus Radio ===
On January 6, 1992, the station relaunched as Campus Radio 97.1 WLS FM with a Top 40 format targeting teens and young adults. Its flagship show, "Top 20 at 12" hosted by Milo Cavarlez ("The Triggerman"), counted down the day's top 20 songs, inspired by BBC Radio 1's Official Chart Show.

Campus Radio also introduced "Campus Aircheck," a pioneering on-air program that served as a training ground for aspiring DJs to get hired.

In 1994, after Mike Enriquez took over GMA's radio operations, Campus Radio shifted to a mass-based format with the slogan "Forever!" and introduced programs like "Message Center," competing with Kool 106's Pager 106. By 2000, DWLS returned to Top 40, using custom jingles from JAM Creative Productions, originally made for Chicago’s WLS-AM.

=== 2007–present: Barangay LS ===
Logo from 2009 to 2011

On February 14, 2007, Campus Radio rebranded as Barangay LS 97.1, revived its old slogan "Forever!" and shifted back to a mass-based format. Despite strong pop ratings, the change was driven by persistent low ad revenue, prompting Mike Enriquez to push for a more commercially viable approach. Most staff stayed, adopting Filipino on-air names and language. However, the revamp drew criticism from loyal listeners, and by January 2008, the station had yet to recover advertising losses.

On January 16, 2008, at 6 PM PHT, the station launched its new tagline, "Ayos!" ("Okay!"), which was also adopted by RGMA's provincial Campus Radio stations. On the same day, nearly all staff from the former Campus Radio format were abruptly dismissed by Mike Enriquez, despite their years of loyal service to GMA Network. Although the station had improved its ratings from #7 to #4, Enriquez believed the existing team lacked the edge to compete further in the current format. They were unceremoniously replaced by on-air talents from RGMA's provincial stations and former jocks from various networks.

On March 23, 2008, the former Campus Radio staff moved to 99.5 FM and launched Campus 99.5. However, the format ended on August 14 due to management and sales issues.

Logo from 2011 to 2014

On January 17, 2011, Barangay LS introduced a new tagline, "Tugstugan Na!" (“Let’s jam!”), and adopted a “crazy fun” branding to refresh its image. Around the same time, Glenn F. Allona replaced Mike Enriquez as program director and station manager, steering the station back toward a music-driven format, revitalizing its core focus on dynamic, high-energy programming centered on music.

On February 17, 2014, Barangay LS underwent a major revamp with new programs, a jingle, logo, and the slogan "Isang Bansa, Isang Barangay" (“One Nation, One Barangay”). RGMA's regional FM stations nationwide, including 99.5 RT in Cebu, 103.5 Wow FM in Davao and Super Radyo DYRU 92.9 in Kalibo, also rebranded under the Barangay FM name.

Logo from 2014 to 2017

Logo from 2017 to 2019

In July 2019, the station revived its original slogan, "Forever!". To mark the occasion, a new station jingle titled "Tayo ay Forever" was released, performed by GMA artists Ken Chan and Rita Daniela under GMA Music.

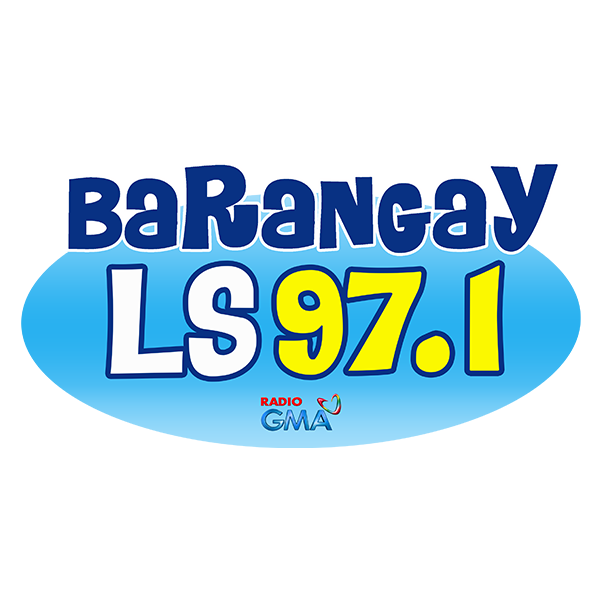
Logo from 2019 to 2023

On March 20, 2020, Barangay LS 97.1 scaled down operations and began simulcasting with Super Radyo DZBB due to the COVID-19 enhanced community quarantine. Full programming and staffing resumed in early 2022 after the simulcast ended, except during their overnight hours with Golden Memories and Liham ng Gabi horror-mystery radio drama on Saturday nights.

On April 5, 2026, most of its regional stations adapted the Barangay LS branding.

On July 8, 2026, one of its DJs, Benjur "Papa Bol" Evangelista, made an appearance in GMA Network's musical drama series, Born to Shine, as a fictionalized version of himself where he interviewed the P-Pop girl group, G22. It serves as the series' cross-promotion to the radio station.

== Notable personalities ==
=== Current ===
- Papa Dudut

=== Former ===
- Robert "Uncle Bob" Stewart (DZXX era)
- Jun Banaag (1976–83)

== See also ==
- Barangay Love Stories
- GMA Network
- GMA News
- DZBB-AM
- GTV
- Dobol B TV
