= DXND-FM =

Radio station in the Philippines

Juander Radyo Iligan (DXND)
- Iligan; Philippines
- Broadcast area: Lanao del Norte, parts of Lanao del Sur
- Frequency: 90.1 MHz
- Branding: 90.1 Juander Radyo

Programming
- Languages: Cebuano, Filipino
- Format: Contemporary MOR, News, Talk
- Network: Juander Radyo

Ownership
- Owner: RSV Broadcasting Network; (Malindang Broadcasting Network Corporation)

History
- First air date: March 1, 1995
- Former names: Campus Radio (March 1, 1995–February 29, 2004); Wow FM (March 1, 2004–February 16, 2014); Super Radyo Manila relay (February 17, 2014-January 2022); DXND (January-October 2022)

Technical information
- Licensing authority: NTC
- Power: 5,000 watts

Links
- Webcast: juanderiligan.ismyradio.com
- Website: juanderradyo.com

DXND (90.1 FM), on-air as 90.1 Juander Radyo, is a radio station owned and operated by RSV Broadcasting Network. Its studio and transmitter are located at MMA Bldg., Camague Highway, Iligan.

== History ==
=== 1995-2022: Under GMA ===
The station was launched on March 1, 1995 as Campus Radio 90.1 with a mass-based format. Under the ownership of GMA Network, Inc., it used to broadcast from Kimberly Bldg. On March 1, 2004, it rebranded as 90.1 Wow FM, one of the very few GMA station to carry such brand. On February 14, 2007, it brought back the Campus Radio branding and adapted the slogan Wow Nindota AH!. At this time, it relocated to Norpen Bldg.

On February 17, 2014, it became a relay station of DZBB in Manila due to cost-cutting measures. In the 1st quarter of 2022, it began airing in-house automated music, while retaining its simulcast of DZBB's selected programs, including 24 Oras. At that time, it was known as simply DXND with the slogan Ang FM ng Iligan. In October 2022, the station went off the air.

=== 2026-present: Under RSV ===
On August 17, 2026, after Malindang Broadcasting Network Corporation acquired this frequency, Juander Radyo transferred to this frequency from 89.1 FM.
