= GMA Regional TV Live! =

Philippine television show

- Title card since 2023
- Genre: News broadcasting
- Directed by: Davis T. Abella
- Presented by: Nikko Sereno; Lou-Anne Mae Rondina
- Narrated by: Al Torres
- Country of origin: Philippines
- Original language: Cebuano

Production
- Executive producer: Mark Regie D. Abella
- Production locations: GMA Cebu Complex, Nivel Hills, Apas, Cebu City
- Camera setup: Multiple-camera setup
- Running time: 25 minutes
- Production companies: GMA Integrated News; GMA Regional TV

Original release
- Network: GMA Cebu
- Release: April 20, 2020 – January 26, 2024

GMA Regional TV Live! is a 2020 Philippine television news broadcasting program broadcast by GMA Cebu. Originally hosted by Nikko Sereno and Cecille Quibod-Castro, it premiered on April 20, 2020 on the network's morning line up. The program concluded January 26, 2024 due to low ratings and declining viewership. Sereno and Lou-Anne Mae Rondina served as the final hosts.

== Overview ==
The show premiered on GMA Cebu on April 20, 2020 with simulcast on GMA TV-11 Bohol, GMA TV-5 Dumaguete, GMA TV-10 Tacloban, GMA TV-5 Calbayog, GMA TV-8 Borongan, and GMA TV-12 Ormoc. It marked the return of GMA Regional TV's producing morning news programs five years after its predecessor Buena Mano Balita went off the air following the a strategic streamlining of programs and manpower in its provincial stations. GMA Regional TV Live! boasts of segments that highlight positive features and stories of people, specifically that of Kapusong Bisdak or Cebuanos.

From February 6, 2023, the program was aired live in front of a studio audience (although some Spotlight and BizTalk segments are pre-recorded). Co-host and correspondent Lou-Anne Mae Rondina replaced Quibod-Castro on July 31, 2023, as the latter became one of the main triumvirates for Regional TV News.

== Final segments ==
- Unang Balita
- GMA Integrated News Weather Center
- Lahi Ra!
- Biztalk
- Spotlight
- Pabawon

== Hosts ==
=== Final hosts ===
- Nikko Sereno (2020–24)
- Lou-Anne Mae Rondina (2023–24)

=== Former hosts ===
- Cecille Quibod-Castro (2020–23)
