= Bobby Nalzaro =

Filipino journalist, radio commentator, and columnist (1963–2022)

- Born: Pablito Galeza Nalzaro; August 11, 1963; Dipolog, Philippines
- Died: March 17, 2022 (aged 58); Cebu City, Philippines
- Other name: Super Bobby
- Education: Ateneo de Zamboanga University
- Occupations: News Commentator and Broadcaster
- Employer: GMA Network
- Notable credit(s): KBP National Award for Outstanding Host & SunStar Cebu's "23 of Cebu’s Most Influential People"
- Spouse: Cecil Nalzaro
- Children: 1

Pablito Galeza Nalzaro (August 11, 1963 – March 17, 2022), also known as Bobby Nalzaro or Super Bob, was a Filipino broadcast journalist, radio commentator and columnist.

He was one of Cebu's tri-media personalities. He handled daily commentary program at DYSS Super Radyo (RGMA Network) and news anchor of GMA 7 Cebuano newscast, Balitang Bisdak. He also wrote columns with SunStar Cebu and Superbalita.

Aside from his native Cebuano (Bisaya), He also spoke fluently in Chavacano, Filipino, and English.

== Early life ==
Nalzaro was born in Dipolog, Zamboanga del Norte, on August 11, 1963. He started in radio at the age of 16. In 1980, he was an anchor/reporter of Radio DXRZ (UMBN/RMN) in Zamboanga City while taking up Bachelor in Mass Communication at the Ateneo de Zamboanga University. He was also a reporter of Zamboanga Express, a local newspaper. He later joined The Morning Times.

== Career ==
In 1987, Nalzaro transferred in Cebu and joined DYMF Bombo Radyo Cebu. He served the station for ten years from an ordinary anchor to acting Station Manager. He resigned in 1997 and joined GMA TV-7 Cebu/RGMA Cebu (now Super Radyo Cebu).

On October 4, 1999, two years after being with GMA Cebu, he became TV news anchor for Balitang Bisdak (formerly 24 Oras Central Visayas from November 10, 2014 to January 29, 2016), to which he was still active. Nalzaro was one of the regional anchors for Balita Pilipinas Primetime on GMA News TV from March 5, 2011, to February 15, 2014. He was program director and chief operations officer of Super Radyo DYSS 999 Cebu of RGMA Network, Inc., a subsidiary of GMA Network. He had served as Kapisanan ng mga Brodkaster ng Pilipinas (KBP) Cebu chapter chairman and KBP regional coordinator.

In 2019, Nalzaro faced arrest after he was filed for 4 counts of libel by Ramon Miguel Osmeña, son of former Cebu City Mayor Tomas Osmeña. That arrest was based on a complaint made by the younger Osmeña in connection with two articles Nalzaro published for SunStar and Superbalita Cebu. He posted bail on September 6, 2019.

== Health and death ==
Nalzaro died on March 17, 2022, due to multiple organ failure at the age of 58. Prior to his death, Nalzaro revealed in his SunStar column in January 2022 that he was hospitalized from December 24 to 30, 2021 after suffering from a mild stroke due to hypertension.

== Awards ==
Year	Award	Category	Result	Reference
2004	13th Annual KBP Golden Dove Awards	Outstanding Public Affairs Host	Won	
2004	Provincial Government of Cebu	Garbo Sa Sugbo Awardee	Awarded	
