= Robert Stewart (entrepreneur) =

American entrepreneur, TV personality, radio and TV producer (1918-2006)

- Born: Robert La Rue Stewart; November 19, 1918; Tucson, Arizona, U.S.
- Died: April 5, 2006 (aged 87); Phoenix, Arizona, U.S.
- Resting place: Loyola Memorial Park; Marikina, Philippines
- Other name: Uncle Bob
- Years active: 1943–1945, 1950–1984
- Known for: Founder of GMA Network Inc.
- Style: Television show host
- Television: The News with Uncle Bob (1961); Uncle Bob's Lucky 7 Club (1960s-1970s); The Maestro and Uncle Bob (1978); The Bob Stewart Show; Uncle Bob & Friends
- Spouse: Loreto Feliciano

Robert La Rue Stewart (November 19, 1918 – April 5, 2006), popularly known in the Philippines as "Uncle Bob", was an American entrepreneur, TV personality, radio and TV producer in the Philippines. He founded GMA Network Inc. on March 1, 1950.

Stewart came to the Philippines in 1943 as a war correspondent for United Press (UP). He fell in love with the country and after the war ended, he decided to stay. In 1948, he met and fell in love with Loreto Feliciano, a widow from Pampanga with three children, and married her the following year.

== Republic Broadcasting System ==
On March 1, 1950, Stewart established Loreto F. de Hemedes, Inc. (later renamed Republic Broadcasting System, Inc. in 1963). On June 14, 1950, AM radio station DZBB began broadcasting from a makeshift studio on the 4th floor of Calvo Bldg in Escolta, which was then the business district of Manila. In 1955, the company launched DZXX, another AM radio station devoted to music, the first pop music station in the country.

After 10 years on the radio, Stewart decided to expand into television despite limited knowledge about the new telecommunication medium. But with vision in mind, on October 29, 1961, RBS TV Channel 7 began broadcasting on a surplus transmitter and two cameras, thus becoming the third TV network in the Philippines. On October 30, 1961, Stewart appeared on camera as the news anchor for The News with Uncle Bob.

During the first five years, the studio was barely surviving but a friend from the United States gave Stewart a good deal on American syndicated TV shows which defined the station's programming in the 1960s. Television shows like Combat!, The Flying Nun, Gilligan's Island, Mission: Impossible and The Man from U.N.C.L.E. found their way to the local viewers through Channel 7. Dancetime with Chito was the first local dance show with brother-in-law Chito Feliciano and his group, became a hit for the station, pulling in viewers and advertising revenues.

=== Uncle Bob's Lucky 7 Club ===
While canned animated cartoons like Popeye the Sailor, The Gumby Show and The Harveytoons Show targeted the youth of his TV station in the 1960s, Stewart created Uncle Bob's Lucky 7 Club, the first live TV show for children in the Philippines. Aired on Saturday mornings, the show made Stewart every child's favorite uncle, also featured two sidekick puppets - Spanky the elephant and Pancho the worm. Stewart is remembered by his endearing viewers for his catchphrase "hot-diggity-dog" and non-lexical vocables like "bum-bum-barum" or "pum-pa-rum-pum".

In 1961, Stewart was threatened with deportation when Diosdado Macapagal became the President of the Philippines. The TV network was being persecuted for supporting rival and then-president Carlos P. Garcia in the 1961 presidential election. After announcing his departure during the show Uncle Bob's Lucky 7 Club, thousands of children, with the help of their parents, rallied behind him, writing letters showing their support. The government backed out of its plan as a result.

=== Martial law ===
Martial law was proclaimed in the Philippines on September 21, 1972, by then-president Ferdinand Marcos. To stop alleged "communist" propaganda, all networks in the country were taken over by the military. All TV and radio stations critical of the Marcos government were all shut down including RBS TV and radio stations. In 1974, the government forbade foreign corporations and foreign citizens from owning any media facilities in the country. Republic Broadcasting System and American Broadcasting Company (ABC), which at that time owned 25% of the company, relinquished control of the company to the triumvirate of Gilberto Duavit, a Malacañang official; Menardo Jimenez and Felipe Gozon, then Stewart's legal adviser. As part of the take over, the name of the TV station was changed to GMA Network (RBS, Inc. became GMA Network Inc. in 1996) and relaunched in 1975 as GMA Radio-Television Arts.

In 1976, DZXX was relaunched as DWLS in the FM band based on the initials of his wife, Loreto Stewart.

=== Uncle Bob and Friends ===
From 1978 to 1986, Stewart hosted a musical show which debuted as The Maestro and Uncle Bob with pianist, composer and conductor Federico Elizalde on the piano. The one-hour TV show featured Elizalde playing a variety of music from classical to jazz. After Elizalde's death in 1979, the show was renamed Uncle Bob and Friends, with mainstay pianist Joselito Pascual.

== Retirement and death ==
In 1984, Imee Marcos, daughter of President Ferdinand Marcos, attempted to take control of GMA Network. However, this attempted takeover was successfully prevented by GMA executives. Stewart retired and moved back to the United States following his utter dissatisfaction with the Marcos regime. His son, Robert Jr. ("Jody"), continued with the children's show during the remainder of the 1980s (renamed The New Uncle Bob's Lucky 7 Club).

Stewart died in Phoenix, Arizona on April 6, 2006, and his remains were cremated before being returned to the Philippines on April 25. His ashes were interred at the Loyola Memorial Park in Marikina next to his wife, who died in 1996 in the United States.

== List of RBS/GMA Shows ==
- The News with Uncle Bob (October 30, 1961, to September 22, 1972)
- Uncle Bob's Lucky 7 Club (November 4, 1961, to April 30, 1994)
- The Maestro and Uncle Bob (1978–1986) retitled to The Bob Stewart Show then Uncle Bob and Friends
