= Felipe Gozon =

Chairman and Adviser of GMA Network Inc.

Felipe L. Gozon
- Born: Felipe Enrique Lapuz Gozon; December 8, 1939 (age 86); Manila, Philippine Commonwealth
- Other names: Atty. Felipe L. Gozon, FLG, Henry, Lolo Ipe
- Education: University of the Philippines Diliman (AA, LLB); Yale University (LLM)
- Occupations: Lawyer, businessman
- Years active: 1963–present
- Known for: Chairman and Adviser of GMA Network Inc.
- Notable work: The Civil Aeronautics Board: Powers, Procedures and Regulations (ISBN 9789712311734)
- Spouse: Teresa M. Gozon
- Children: 3 including Annette
- Parent(s): Benjamin M. Gozon; Carolina S. Lapuz

Felipe Enrique "Henry" Lapuz Gozon (born December 8, 1939), is a Filipino lawyer, business executive, and the current chairman and adviser of the board of GMA Network Inc., one of the largest media conglomerate in the Philippines.

A lawyer by profession, the Yale-educated Gozon led GMA to become the ratings-leading television and digital network in the Philippines beginning in 2004, surpassing the ratings of its closest competitor, the long-dominant ABS-CBN network. During Gozon's tenure as chairman, the network has also experienced stability in terms of revenues, mostly from advertising and other revenue sources.

On December 31, 2023, Gozon retired his post as the CEO of GMA; Gilberto R. Duavit, Jr., the company's president and COO took over his position on January 1, 2024. Gozon retains his position as Chairman of the Board and Adviser.

== Early and personal life ==
Felipe Enrique "Henry" Lapuz Gozon was born December 8, 1939. His parents were Benjamin M. Gozon and Carolina S. Lapuz. She graduated from the UP College of Pharmacy and founded Dalisay Patis. His siblings are Ben, Kay Jimenez and Florencia Tarriela, first Philippine National Bank woman Chair. Their father was appointed Bureau of Mines Director and served as Secretary of Agriculture in 1962. Gozon is married to Teresa "Tessie". They have three children including Anna Teresa M. Gozon-Valdes, Philip Gozon and Maritess Gozon-Viterbo.

He attended his primary education at Malabon Elementary School in Malabon, Rizal and Union Elementary School in Malate, Manila.

He attended his secondary education at UP Preparatory High School.

== Career ==
Atty. Felipe L. Gozon graduated from the University of the Philippines Diliman with the degrees of Associate in Arts in 1958 and Bachelor of Laws in 1962. He placed 13th during the 1963 Philippine Bar Examination. He obtained his Master of Laws degree from Yale University in 1965. He is a senior partner in the law firm of Belo Gozon Elma Parel Asuncion & Lucila.

As a distinguished aviation lawyer, he was a member of the Philippine Air Negotiating Panel and is cited in the Asia Pacific Legal 500 as a leading expert in this field.

His business experience includes acting as a director of the International Corporate Bank and as chairman of Marcopper Mining Corporation. Atty. Gozon has been the chairman of the board of directors of the company since 1975. He currently holds the positions of chairman, president and chief executive officer. Since assuming leadership of the company in October 2000, the company's ratings have improved greatly, surpassing its nearest competitor in 2003. Atty. Gozon was named CEO of the Year by UNO Magazine in 2004 and Master Entrepreneur of the Year (Philippines) 2004 by SGV & Co./Ernst & Young in 2005. People Asia Magazine included him in the list of People of the Year 2005. He is also currently chairman, vice-chairman or director of several other institutions such as the Malayan Bank Savings & Mortgage Bank, the Children's Museum and Library, Inc., Asian Institute of Journalism and Communication and the Nova Foundation for Differently Abled Persons, Inc. He is also a director and/or chairman of some of the subsidiaries and affiliates of the company, such as GMA New Media, GMA Films, Alta Productions, Citynet, GMA Marketing and Productions, Inc., Scenarios, Inc., EMC Network, Inc., GMA Kapuso Foundation, INQ7 Interactive, Inc., GMA Records, Mont-Aire and Kapwa Ko Mahal Ko.

Gozon was among the 61 awardees that included Reynato Puno, who were honored as UP's distinguished alumni by the UP Alumni Association (UPAA) at the Araneta Coliseum on June 21, 2008. Gozon received an award for the Lapuz-Gozon family whose members up to the third generation studied in UP.

== Awards ==
=== 2015 ===
- Global Leadership Award for Excellence in Media Sector (The first Filipino recipient of this international award), The Leaders International together with the American Leadership Development Association (ALDA)

=== 2014 ===
- Ulirang Ama Award, National Mother's Day and Father's Day Foundation, Inc.

=== 2013 ===
- Distinguished Achievement Award, International Honor Society of Phi Kappa Phi University of the Philippines Chapter (045)

=== 2012 ===
- Certificate of Recognition, Civil Aeronautics Board (Philippines)
- Platinum Business Icon Award, BizNews Asia
- Lifetime Distinguished Achievement Award, University of the Philippines Alumni Association (UPAA)

=== 2011 ===
- Tycoon of the Decade, BizNews Asia
- Outstanding Manilan, City Government of Manila

=== 2009 ===
- Business Excellence Award, BizNews Asia

=== 2005 ===
- People of the Year Award, Asia Magazine

=== 2004 ===
- CEO of the Year Award, UNO Magazine
- Master Entrepreneur Award, SGV/Ernst & Young

=== 1993 ===
- Presidential Award of Merit, Philippine Bar Association

=== 1991 ===
- Chief Justice Special Award, Chief Justice of the Supreme Court of the Philippines

=== 1990 ===
- Presidential Award of Merit, Philippine Bar Association

Business positions
Preceded by Gilberto Duavit Sr.	Chairman, GMA Network; 1976–present	Succeeded by Incumbent
Preceded by Menardo Jimenez	President, GMA Network; 2000–2010	Succeeded by Gilberto Duavit Jr.
