= GMA Network Inc. =

Philippine media and entertainment company

- Logo used since October 27, 2002

- The GMA Network Center in Diliman, Quezon City, the company's headquarters.
- Trade name: GMA; GMA Network; GMA Network Corporate; GMA Corporate; GMA Group; Kapuso
- Formerly: Loreto F. de Hemedes Inc. (1950–1974); Republic Broadcasting System (1974–1996)
- Type: Public
- Traded as: PSE: GMA7
- Industry: Mass media; Entertainment
- Founded: March 1, 1950; 76 years ago (SEC Registration No.: 5213)
- Founder: Robert "Uncle Bob" Stewart
- Headquarters: GMA Network Center, EDSA corner Timog Avenue, Brgy. South Triangle, Diliman, Quezon City, Metro Manila, Philippines
- Area served: Worldwide
- Key people: Felipe Gozon (Chairman and Adviser); Gilberto Duavit Jr. (President and CEO); Felipe S. Yalong (EVP and CFO); Annette Gozon-Valdes (Senior Vice President)
- Products: Films; Music; Television programs; Web portals
- Brands: GMA Network; GTV; Heart of Asia; I Heart Movies; GMA Affordabox; GMA Now; GMA Pinoy TV; GMA Life TV; GMA News TV; Super Radyo; Barangay LS; Kapuso Stream
- Services: Broadcasting; Motion pictures; Television production; Cable television; Internet; Streaming service; Record label; Satellite television; Film distribution
- Revenue: ▼ ₱9.67 billion (9M FY2026)
- Operating income: ▼ (₱179.4 million) (9M26)
- Net income: ▼ ₱32.853 million (9M26)
- Total assets: ▼ ₱23.372 billion (9M26)
- Total equity: ▼ ₱11.534 billion (9M26)
- Owners: Group Management and Development Inc. (28.64%); FLG Management and Development Corporation (26.38%); M.A. Jimenez Enterprises (15.53%); Television International Corporation (12.03%)
- Number of employees: 3,316 (2024)
- Parent: GMA Holdings Inc.
- Divisions: GMA Entertainment Group; Sparkle GMA Artist Center; GMA Kapuso Foundation; GMA News; GMA Public Affairs; GMA Regional TV; GMA International; GMA Worldwide (Philippines) Inc.; Synergy: A GMA Collaboration
- Subsidiaries: Digify; RGMA Marketing and Productions; GMA Network Films; GMA New Media; Alta Productions Group; Citynet Network Marketing and Productions
- Website: www.gmanetwork.com/corporate/

GMA Network Inc., commonly known as GMA and a backronym of its former trade name Global Media Arts, is a Filipino media company based in Diliman, Quezon City, Metro Manila, Philippines. GMA is primarily involved in radio and television broadcasting, with subsidiaries dealing in various media-related businesses. The majority of its profits are derived from publicity and marketing incomes associated with television distribution.

GMA Network was founded on March 1, 1950 by American entrepreneur Robert "Uncle Bob" Stewart as Loreto F. de Hemedes Inc. The company launched its first radio station, DZBB on June 14, 1950. Its first broadcast on television was launched on October 29, 1961, and the television station was known as DZBB Channel 7.

In 1974, the company became known as Republic Broadcasting System (RBS) after the triumvirate of Gilberto Duavit Sr., Menardo Jimenez and Felipe Gozon due to the changes in media ownership laws. It then changed its corporate name to GMA Network Inc. on May 16, 1996, when the network identity became GMA Network. Its common shares as well as Philippine Depositary Receipts (PDRs) are traded on the Philippine Stock Exchange under the ticker symbol GMA7.

== History ==
The company's roots can be traced back to then Loreto F. de Hemedes Inc., founded by Robert Stewart, an American war correspondent. The company started with the launching of its first AM radio station in Manila through DZBB. It went on air on March 1, 1950, using the frequency of 580 kHz of the AM band, broadcasting from the Calvo Building in Escolta, Manila. Its early radio coverage highlights were the crash of President Ramon Magsaysay's plane in Mount Manunggal; the eruption of Mount Hibok-Hibok and various local elections in the Philippines. DZBB became the first radio station in the Philippines to use telephones for live interviews.

Within years since its first broadcasts, the huge triumph of the station and its growing number of listeners made clear the move to modern facilities in EDSA, Quezon City, with the work done in 1959.

On October 29, 1961, the company launched its first television station, RBS TV Channel 7 using local VHF channel 7. In 1963, DYSS Television was launched in Cebu. On May 28, 1974, the company was renamed as Republic Broadcasting System Inc. A triumvirate composed of Gilberto Duavit Sr., Menardo Jimenez and Felipe Gozon took over the company from Stewart at the same year.

In 1987, GMA became the first Philippine network to broadcast in StereoVision while opening their high-end live studio at Broadway Centrum. In 1988, the network greatly improved its signal by switching to its 777-ft transmitter known as the Tower of Power. In 1992, the Philippine Congress passed a law granting the network to operate for another 25 years. The network launched the Rainbow Satellite, making their programs available nationwide and across Southeast Asia. In 1996, the company changed its name to GMA Network Inc.

On April 21, 2017, Philippine President Rodrigo Duterte signed Republic Act No. 10925, renewing GMA Network's license for another 25 years. The law granted GMA Network Inc. a franchise to construct, install, operate, and maintain radio broadcasting stations and television stations for commercial purposes, including a digital television system. This franchise encompasses the establishment of corresponding facilities such as relay stations throughout the Philippines.

== Television ==
=== GMA Network ===
GMA Network, or simply GMA (Global Media Arts), is a major Philippine commercial television network. Launched on October 29, 1961, GMA Network is also referred to as the "Kapuso Network" in reference to the company's logo. Its headquarters can be found at the GMA Network Center in Quezon City.

=== GTV ===
GTV (Good Television) is a Philippine general entertainment channel that aired on its flagship station, UHF channel 27 and was launched on February 22, 2021, replacing GMA News TV. The channel carries news, entertainment and sports programs and it is available in most satellite and cable TV systems.

=== Heart of Asia ===
Heart of Asia is a Philippine digital television channel owned by GMA Network Inc. Its programming consisting of Filipino-dubbed Asian films and television series. The channel was initially launched on June 12, 2020, and officially launched on June 29, 2020.

=== I Heart Movies ===
I Heart Movies is a movie channel owned by GMA Network Inc. Its programming consisting of films produced and distributed by GMA Pictures. The channel was initially launched on March 25, 2021, and officially launched on April 5, 2021.

== International broadcasts ==
=== GMA Pinoy TV ===
On March 14, 2005, GMA Network Inc. launched its first international channel, GMA Pinoy TV. The channel is targeted toward Filipino communities worldwide. Flagship programs from GMA Network are shown aside from in-house programming. It also syndicates shows and airs a simulcast of ABS-CBN Studios' It's Showtime with TFC and AMBS' All TV. GMA Pinoy TV is available in cities in the United States, Canada, Kenya, Papua New Guinea, Morocco, Middle East, Australia, New Zealand, Zambia and some parts of Asia and Europe.

=== GMA Life TV ===
On February 16, 2008, GMA International launched its second international channel, GMA Life TV. It carries programming from GMA Network and its former lifestyle channel in the Philippines, Q. It also carries new programs broadcast by the news channel, GMA News TV. GMA Life TV is available through cable and satellite television providers worldwide.

=== GMA News TV ===
On July 1, 2011, GMA International launched its third international channel, GMA News TV (formerly GMA News TV International). Its programming consisting of news and public affairs programs produced by GMA Integrated News and GMA Public Affairs. The channel is available through cable and satellite television providers worldwide. It is the third international channel of GMA Network Inc. after GMA Pinoy TV and GMA Life TV.

== Radio ==
=== DZBB ===
DZBB, also known as Super Radyo DZBB 594, is the AM radio station of RGMA in Metropolitan Manila, one of GMA Network's subsidiaries. Its radio studios are located at 3rd floor of GMA Network Studio Annex, EDSA corner GMA Network Drive, Diliman, Quezon City while its transmitter is at Camia St., Brgy. Panghulo, Obando, Bulacan. The station operates 24 hours a day, except on Sundays in where it goes off air from midnight to 03:00 am. Some of the programs of GMA and GTV's Dobol B TV block are simultaneously aired on the station.

==== Provincial AM Stations ====
Branding and Callsign	Frequency	Broadcast Location
Super Radyo DYSP	909 kHz	Palawan
Super Radyo DYSS	999 kHz	Cebu
Super Radyo DYSI	1323 kHz	Iloilo
Super Radyo DXRC	1287 kHz	Zamboanga
Super Radyo DXGM	1125 kHz	Davao

=== DWLS ===
DWLS-FM, also known as Barangay LS 97.1, is the FM radio station of RGMA in Metropolitan Manila, a subsidiary of GMA Network. Its main radio studios are located at the 3rd floor of GMA Network Studio Annex, EDSA corner GMA Network Drive, Diliman, Quezon City and its transmitter is at Tandang Sora Avenue, Barangay Culiat, Quezon City. DWLS is the assigned call letters for the radio station and it was derived from the name of Loreto Stewart, the wife of its founder, Robert La Rue "Uncle Bob" Stewart.

==== Provincial FM Stations ====
Callsign	Branding	Frequency	Broadcast Location
DWWQ	Barangay LS 89.3	89.3 MHz	Tuguegarao
DWRA	Barangay LS 92.7	92.7 MHz	Baguio
DWTL	Barangay LS 93.5	93.5 MHz	Dagupan
DWQL	Barangay LS 91.1	91.1 MHz	Lucena
DYHY	Barangay LS 97.5	97.5 MHz	Palawan
DWQW	Barangay LS 101.5	101.5 MHz	Naga
DWCW	Barangay LS 96.3	96.3 MHz	Legazpi
DYRU	Barangay RU Super Radyo 92.9	92.9 MHz	Kalibo
DYMK	Barangay LS 93.5	93.5 MHz	Iloilo
DYEN	Barangay LS 107.1	107.1 MHz	Bacolod
DYRT	Barangay LS 99.5	99.5 MHz	Cebu
DXLX	Barangay LS 100.7	100.7 MHz	Cagayan De Oro
DXRV	Barangay LS 103.5	103.5 MHz	Davao
DXCJ	Barangay FM Super Radyo 102.3	102.3 MHz	General Santos

== Broadcast facilities ==
=== Tower of Power ===
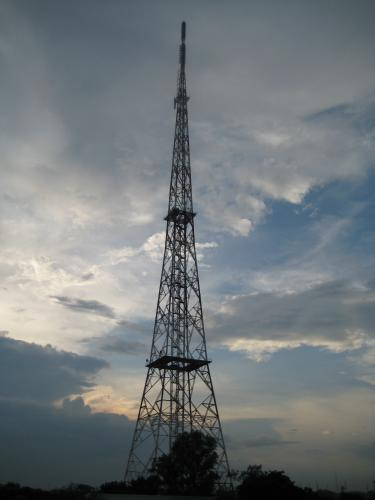
GMA Network transmitter at Brgy. Culiat, Tandang Sora, Quezon City

In order to strengthen its broadcast signal in Metropolitan Manila and its suburbs, GMA Network Inc. constructed the Tower of Power in the third quarter of 1987.

GMA Network, Inc. spent more than PhP168 million to the upgrade its broadcast transmitters and facilities in various key cities in the Philippines. It plans to augment its existing studio facilities in Cebu, Iloilo and Davao. It also plans to upgrade construction of its existing broadcast facilities in Dagupan to further improve its coverage in the northern part of the Philippines. These upgrades include new transmitting equipment, from transmitters to antenna systems and buildings/tower rehabilitation/construction. GMA Network Inc. expects completion of these projects by end 2009.

Presented to the Philippine Stock Exchange on January 15, 2009, GMA Network, Inc. discloses that it already disbursed almost PhP1.3 billion from the proceeds of its initial public offering to support various expansion programs in key cities in the Philippines. Expansion includes construction of broadcast facility, tower and transmitter upgrade for its Naga station; broadcast facility and transmitter tower for its Legazpi station; construction of transmitter tower and upgrading its General Santos station; and upgrading broadcast facilities, equipment and transmitter tower in Davao, Cebu, Guimaras, Bacolod, Iloilo, Batangas, Dagupan, Cagayan de Oro and Benguet.

=== GMA Network Center ===
GMA Network, Inc. inaugurated its state-of-the-art GMA Network Center on June 14, 2000, as part of the year-round celebration to commemorate its 50th anniversary. GMA Network Center supports GMA Network, Inc.'s thrusts towards digitization and media convergence. While the first phase of the project has already been completed with the construction of the 17-storey corporate complex, the center has an option to upgrade the older, existing facilities in the GMA compound, as originally planned.

=== GMA Kapuso Center ===
GMA Kapuso Center is a 3-storey building located on Samar Avenue cor. GMA Network Drive in Quezon City, inside the GMA Complex. It is the main office of GMA Kapuso Foundation, as well as Kapuso Action Center.

=== GMA Network Studios ===
The GMA Network Studios consist of seven studios and are named Studios 1-7 (except German Moreno Studio) based on their size. Studio 1 and Studio 4 (formerly known as Studio A and Studio B, respectively) were the first two old studios of GMA Network which is located in the old compound (formerly known as the RBS compound), which is being demolished as of April 2023 to make way for the construction of a new studio building. Studio 2, 3, and 5 are located in GMA Network Center building. The German Moreno Studio (formerly Studio 6) and Studio 7, the largest studios of GMA Network, are located in the GMA Network Studio Annex.

- Studio 1 was the network's oldest studio which housed the programs of GMA News TV (formerly QTV/Q, now GTV), along with Radio-Television Arts-era programs such as Student Canteen and Weekend with Velez.
- Studio 2 is their second smallest studio, which houses the GTV noontime newscast, Balitanghali; the defunct afternoon news and magazine show, Dapat Alam Mo!; and State of the Nation. The green screen used on weather reports of GMA Integrated News' programs is also located here. In 2022, the studio was renovated for the Eleksyon 2022, the 2022 Philippine national and local elections coverage of GMA News and Public Affairs. The newly renovated studio was designed by the Emmy award-winning US firm, FX Design Group and uses the latest technology from Vizrt and Red Spy. It features LED video walls, color-changing panels, and an open-floor space.
- Studio 3 houses is the third smallest studio in the complex. It is the home studio of the Philippines' longest-running morning show, Unang Hirit. On October 2, 2023, the program unveiled its renovated studio set designed by FX Design Group. The current studio set resembles to that of studios 2 and 5, as well as The Today Show's Studio 1A in Rockefeller Center in New York City.
- Studio 4 was the fourth largest studio in the complex. It was located in the old GMA Building and one of the oldest studios in the complex. It was occupied by the Saturday morning talk and lifestyle show, Sarap, 'Di Ba? as well as Radio-Television Arts / Rainbow Satellite-era programs GMA Supershow and Lunch Date before moving to the Broadway Centrum in 1987. The studio, along with the old GMA building and Studio 1 is being demolished as of April 2023 to make way for the construction of a new studio building.
- Studio 5 is the third largest studio in the complex. It is one of the most technologically advanced studio in the country. It is equipped with state-of-the-art broadcast equipment like HD video systems, audio systems, and cameras. In 2019, the studio was renovated. The renovation makes the studio equipped with augmented reality (AR) technology and immersive graphics by Vizrt. The studio has large video walls, video floors, and a lot of TV screens used by news programs. GMA's flagship newscasts, 24 Oras and its weekend edition, as well as the late night newscast, Saksi are being broadcast live in this studio.
- The German Moreno Studio (formerly and still known as Studio 6) has an area of 640 square meters and can accommodate 300 to 400 audiences. Its former tenants include Walang Tulugan with the Master Showman, Startalk, Showbiz Central, Pinoy Records, All-Star K!, and Wowowin. It houses the variety noontime show TiktoClock.
- Studio 7 is home to various shows of GMA like All-Out Sundays (and its predecessors, SOP, Party Pilipinas, Sunday All Stars, and Sunday PinaSaya), The Boobay and Tekla Show, Bubble Gang, iBilib and most of the reality and game shows produced by the network. Studio 7 has an area of 1,020 square meters and can accommodate 600 to 800 audiences.

GMA Network, Inc. takes a significant step in the continuous strengthening and improvement of the network's news department with a P154 million (2.9m USD) investment on a Newsroom Automation System (NAS). A signing of agreement between GMA Network and Vizrt was held on March 14, 2018, at the GMA Network Center in Quezon City.

== Digital television ==
The National Telecommunications Commission (NTC) was ordered all broadcasting companies in the Philippines to shut off their analog signal by 11:59 p.m. on December 31, 2015, and switch to digital broadcast. The Philippines will be using the Japanese ISDB-T to facilitate the country's transition to digital television, rather than the ATSC system implemented by North American broadcasters devised as a replacement for the NTSC system utilized by North America and the Philippines.

GMA Network is presently applying for a digital television license from the NTC to install and maintain transmitting stations that will be attuned with and utilize to offer digital terrestrial television and digital mobile TV broadcast services, using channel 27 (551.143 MHz) frequency. Areas planned for a temporary digital broadcast will cover the cities of Quezon City, Makati, Pasig, Tagaytay, and Angeles City in Pampanga; and areas like Ortigas, Cavite, and Calumpit in Bulacan.

GMA Network, Inc. asked the NTC to reconsider its decision to use the Japanese standard and examine the European digital broadcast system instead. In earlier decisions, the National Telecommunications Commission reaffirmed its resolutions to use ISDB-T and conduct public consultations for its implementing rules and regulations which will be ready by April 2011. On March 27, 2011, the local regulator ordered an evaluation of the standard to be used by the Philippines for digital television and reconsidering the second-generation Digital Video Broadcasting (DVB2) from Europe and replacing the Japanese Integrated Services Digital Broadcasting (ISDB) standard.

In February 2013, GMA Network, Inc. was able to conduct digital test broadcast with the ISDB-T standard via its UHF channel 27's frequency. GMA Network was the first television network in the Philippines to broadcast GMA-7 and GMA News TV-11 in standard definition (SD) format with a 4:3 aspect ratio, similar to TV channels in European countries, although the content had been stretched horizontally from its original 4:3 ratio. GMA was also transmitting 1seg on mobile and had no errors. However, in a statement, the network has not conceded its stand to prefer the European DVB-T2 over the Japanese ISDB-T.

== Online ==
=== GMA News Online ===
GMA News Online
- Former name: GMANews.TV
- Website type: News website
- Available in: Filipino; English
- Headquarters: GMA Network Center, EDSA corner Timog Avenue, Diliman, Quezon City
- Country of origin: Philippines
- Area served: Worldwide
- Owner: GMA Network Inc.
- Key people: Michelle Seva (Officer In Charge of GMA Integrated News); Grace dela Peña-Reyes (Consultant, News); John Manalastas (Editor-in-Chief); Howie Severino (Editor-at-Large)
- Parent: GMA New Media
- Website: gmanetwork.com/news
- Launched: January 1, 2007; 19 years ago
- Current status: Active

Established on January 1, 2007, GMA News Online (formerly GMANews.TV) is the official site of GMA Integrated News. It features the latest news coverage, including video reports, as well as business, sports, technology, entertainment and special reports, mobile alerts, newsletters, RSS feeds and real time search. A diverse number of presenters and correspondents maintain blogs on its site and has an archiving database for its news content. A live stream of DZBB, an AM radio station of GMA Network is also available on its website. It also features YouScoop, an interactive section, wherein viewers can upload first-hand footage of news events happening in their area and visitors can also view such footage. Aside from GMA Integrated News content and materials produced, GMA News Online publishes articles and features from several news organizations, including The Associated Press and Reuters wire service. In December 2010, GMANews.TV received one million page views per day.

On February 7, 2011, GMANews.TV was renamed to GMA News Online and launched a new logo and slogan, "The Go-to Site For Filipinos Everywhere"; and retain its uniform resource locator, www.gmanews.tv to correspond with the launching of its all-news channel, GMA News TV.

=== myGMA Internet TV ===
On September 12, 2008, GMA Network, Inc. launched its first video-on-demand service through myGMA Internet TV. Focusing on Filipino communities, it offers high-quality programs from GMA Network. It is an alternative to Filipino communities who does not have the access of cable TV and direct-to-home subscriptions. myGMA Internet TV competed with ABS-CBN's TFC.tv (now folded into iWant). Currently, myGMA Internet TV is inactive. The service was replaced by Kapuso Stream.

=== Kapuso Stream ===
Kapuso Stream
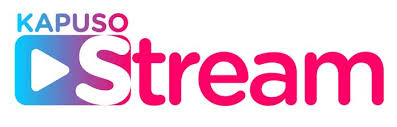
- Website type: Web-based channel
- Available in: Filipino (main); English (secondary)
- Predecessors: myGMA Internet TV (2008–2010); GMA Online Exclusives (2017–2020); GMA Entertainment Shows Online (2020–2022)
- Headquarters: GMA Network Center, EDSA corner Timog Avenue, Diliman, Quezon City
- Country of origin: Philippines
- Area served: Philippines; Asia; Europe; Australia; New Zealand
- Owner: GMA Network Inc.
- Key people: Felipe Gozon (Chairman of the Board and Adviser); Gilberto Duavit Jr. (President and CEO, GMA Network Inc.); Annette Gozon-Valdes (Senior Vice President, GMA Network Inc.); Dennis Augusto L. Caharian (President and COO and General Manager, GMA New Media Inc.)
- Industry: Entertainment; Mass media
- Parent: GMA New Media
- Website: gmanetwork.com/entertainment/tv/kapuso_stream
- Registration: None
- Launched: June 20, 2022; 4 years ago
- Current status: Active

Kapuso Stream is a web-based channel owned and operated by GMA New Media, a subsidiary of GMA Network Inc., that launched on June 20, 2022, and livestreams on Facebook and YouTube. It airs original programming from GMA and GTV, as well as a simulcast of ABS-CBN Studios' It's Showtime along with AMBS' All TV and Pinoy Big Brother: Celebrity Collab Edition and its second season. Livestreaming of shows on both platforms are available worldwide. Kapuso Stream primarily competes with ABS-CBN's Kapamilya Online Live and TV5's Kapatid Livestream.

Online streaming on GMA Network's official website and Kapuso Stream, does not include acquired programming, Viu original and movie blocks which aired on TV, as the live-streaming is only focused on network-produced content due to copyright restrictions.

== Joint ventures ==
=== Philippine Entertainment Portal (PEP) ===
Philippine Entertainment Portal Inc., a joint venture between GMA New Media Inc. and Summit Media, operates Philippine Entertainment Portal (PEP) and Sports Interactive Network (SPIN). Joint venture was ended on November 11, 2026.

=== Kapuso JobMarket ===
Partnerships of GMA Network Inc., the Philippine Daily Inquirer, INQ7 Interactive Inc. and New Media Inc. The Kapuso JobMarket aims to provide convenience for job seekers by creating another online service that will help them search for employment opportunities using their mobile phones.

=== Q ===
Q was a partnership between GMA Network Inc. and ZOE Broadcasting Network. The television channel previously aired foreign dramas, lifestyle shows and public affairs programming. The channel ceased commercial operation on February 20, 2011, to give way to its sister channel, GMA News TV.

== Defunct channels ==
=== INQ7.net ===
GMA Network Inc. partnered with the Philippine Daily Inquirer, one of Philippines' daily broadsheets to venture in an online multimedia news and information delivery company, INQ7 Interactive Inc. Its main business offers text, images, audio, video and online interactive information tools such as discussion boards, polls and searchable news archives. The partnership also paved the way the creation of a joint web site, the inq7.net and in recent reports, its ranks no. 11 in the most read online newspaper worldwide. In January 2007, GMA Network, Inc. and Philippine Daily Inquirer ended their partnership and GMA Network Inc. focused on to its owned consent site, the GMA News Online (formerly known as GMANews.TV).

=== GMA News TV (Philippines) ===
The domestic counterpart of GMA News TV was a Philippine news and lifestyle-oriented channel that was launched on February 28, 2011, and was aired on local UHF channel 27 and formerly VHF channel 11 through its blocktime agreement with ZOE Broadcasting Network until June 3, 2019. On February 21, 2021, GMA News TV stopped its broadcast operations to give way for GTV the following day.

=== Q (Quality Television) ===
On November 11, 2005, GMA Network, Inc. entered an airtime agreement with ZOE Broadcasting Network to use DZOE-TV channel 11 for its local lifestyle channel, Q (formerly QTV, Quality Television). Most of Q's programming consists of foreign dramas, reality and lifestyle shows. On February 20, 2011, Q ceased commercial operation to give way to GMA News TV.

=== Channel [V] Philippines ===
On December 15, 1999, STAR TV Network leased the airtime of Citynet to launch Channel V Philippines through EMC (Entertainment Music Channel). Part of the strategy is to localize Channel V with programs produced locally by STAR TV Network and GMA Network Inc.

=== EMC (Entertainment Music Channel) ===
In 1999, Entertainment Music Channel or EMC is the first music channel of GMA Network Inc. after its UHF station, Citynet Television was rebranded due to high programming cost and stiff competition from free-to-air UHF TV channels. The music channel only lasted months after GMA Network Inc. signed a leased broadcast agreement with STAR TV Network to transmit a localize music television station, Channel [V] Philippines.

=== Citynet Television ===
On August 27, 1995, GMA Network Inc. inaugurate its first ultra-high-frequency channel through DWDB-TV channel 27 in Metropolitan Manila. It was the first UHF television channel operated by a major broadcast network in the Philippines. GMA Network Inc. launches its new channel under the Citynet Television brand and decided to expand its local programming business. Studios are located at the GMA Network Center in Quezon City. In April 1999, Citynet Television ceased its commercial operation and later on reformatted into a local music channel.

=== CGMA ===
On February 1, 1993, GMA Network Inc. ventured into cable television via CGMA, is a 24 hour cable channel available on Home Cable, Sky Cable and Destiny Cable. It broadcast defunct and previously aired shows on GMA Network from 1980–2000. Eventually, CGMA ceased its commercial operation on July 25, 2001 when Home Cable and Destiny Cable entered into a memorandum of agreement to consolidate the operation of its company with Sky Cable's parent company Sky Cable Corporation, a subsidiary of ABS-CBN Corporation, GMA Network Inc.'s main competitor.

GMA didn't have its own cable channel until 2005 with the launch of GMA Pinoy TV, but unlike CGMA, GMA Pinoy TV (and its sister channels) only caters to international audiences.

=== Fox Filipino ===
Fox Filipino was an archive entertainment cable television channel launched on March 1, 2012. It featured Filipino-produced programming from GMA Network and Filipino movies from GMA Pictures, entries from the Cinemalaya Philippine Independent Film Festival, selected Asian and Hollywood movies, and selected foreign programming dubbed in Filipino language. After 8 years of broadcasting, Fox Networks Group announced that Fox Filipino would cease broadcast on July 7, 2020, as GMA and TV5 archived content were moved to GMA's digital television channels, Heart of Asia, Pinoy Hits and Cignal-run satellite channel, One Screen, respectively.

=== Hallypop ===
Hallypop was the Philippine version of the U.S.-based Asian pop culture digital channel, operating under a licensed branding agreement with Jungo TV. The joint venture between both parties was established in 2019, leading to the channel's initial launch on September 6, 2020, and its official launch on September 20, 2020. It ceased operations on September 20, 2024 alongside its sister channel Pinoy Hits.

=== Pinoy Hits ===
Pinoy Hits (lit. 'filipino hits') was a Philippine digital television channel owned by GMA Network Inc. Its programming consisting of classic television programs produced by GMA Entertainment Group, GMA Integrated News and GMA Public Affairs, also include simulcasts programming from GMA Network and GTV, such as Unbreak My Heart. The channel was initially launched on January 2, 2023, and officially launched on January 16, 2023. Pinoy Hits competed with ABS-CBN's Jeepney TV. It ceased operations on September 20, 2024 alongside its sister channel Hallypop.

== Executive management ==
- Felipe L. Gozon (chairman and adviser of the board; Chairman of the Programming Committee)
- Gilberto Duavit Jr. (president, chief executive officer, chief operating officer; Vice Chairman of the Programming Committee)
- Felipe S. Yalong (chief financial officer, EVP for Corporate Services Group, corporate treasurer, director)
- Jose Marcelo G. Jimenez (Board Member; Chairman of the Executive Committee)
- Anna Theresa "Annette" M. Gozon-Valdes (Board Secretary, Board Member, Senior Vice President for Talent Management Development, Program Management, Human Resources Department, Legal Department, Worldwide Department and other subsidiaries)
- Judith Duavit-Vasquez (Board Member)
- Laura J. Westfall (Board Member)
- Artemio Panganiban (Board Member and Independent Director)
- Cheryl Ching-Sy (Officer-in-charge for Entertainment Group and Vice President for Drama)
- Michelle Seva (Officer In Charge of GMA Integrated News and Vice President for News Programs and Specials)
- Marivic Araneta (Officer In Charge of Regional TV and Synergy and Senior Assistant Vice President and Deputy Head of Synergy)
- Nessa S. Valdellon (Senior Vice president for Public Affairs, Executive Vice President, GMA Pictures)
- Joy C. Marcelo (First Vice president for Sparkle, GMA Artist Center)
- Glenn F. Allona (First Vice President for Radio Operations Group)
- Ayahl Ari Augusto P. Chio (vice president for investor relations and compliance)
- Eduardo P. Santos, CPA (Compliance Officer and Internal Auditor)
- Roberto O. Parel (corporate secretary)
- Lizelle G. Maralag (Chief Marketing Officer)
- Elvis B. Ancheta (Senior Vice President for Engineering)
- Ronaldo P. Mastrili (Senior Vice President for Finance and ICT)
- Regie C. Bautista (Senior Vice President for Corporate Strategic Planning and Business Development and Concurrent Chief Risk Officer and Head of Program Support)

== Assets ==
=== Divisions ===
==== GMA Entertainment Group ====
The entertainment division of the company that produces drama, comedy, reality, variety, game, and talk shows. It is currently headed by its Officer-In-Charge Cheryl Ching-Sy.

- BDD I - Drama Productions
- BDD II - Comedy/Infotainment/Game & Reality Productions
- BDD III - Talk/Magazine/Musical Variety/Specials and Alternative Productions

==== GMA News ====
The news division of the company that generates news output for GMA Network's television, radio, and digital media platforms. The division is headed by Officer-In-Charge Michelle Seva, Under Seva's leadership, GMA News was rebranded as GMA Integrated News, integrating the newsrooms of GMA News Manila, GMA News Online, and GMA Regional TV.

- GMA News Manila
- GMA News Online
- GMA Regional TV
- GMA Integrated News Sports (GMA Sports PH)
- GMA Integrated News Research
- GMA Integrated News Weather Center (formerly IMReady)
- YouScoop+ (formerly YouScoop)

==== GMA Regional TV ====
GMA Regional TV
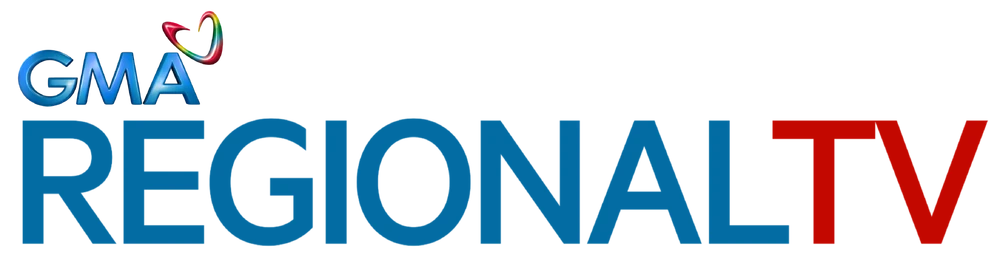
- Logo used since 2022
- Formerly: RGMA Network, Inc. (1998–2010)
- Type: Division
- Industry: Broadcast television; Radio broadcasting
- Founded: 1998; 28 years ago
- Headquarters: GMA Network Center, EDSA corner Timog Avenue, Diliman, Quezon City, Metro Manila, Philippines
- Area served: Philippines
- Key people: Marivic Araneta (OIC for Regional TV)
- Products: Television channels; Radio stations
- Parent: GMA Network Inc.
- Divisions: Synergy: A GMA Collaboration
- Website: gmanetwork.com/regionaltv

The regional division of the company that operates all GMA Network and GTV stations except GMA Manila and GTV Manila. It also produces local newscasts for 6 areas/regions in the country. The division is also headed by Officer-In-Charge Marivic Araneta.

- 51 GMA Network stations + DZBB-TV Channel 7 (GMA Manila)
- 26 GTV stations + DWDB-TV Channel 27(GTV Manila)
- 27 digital television stations + DZBB-TV Channel 15 (GMA Manila)

==== Synergy: A GMA Collaboration ====
Synergy: A GMA Collaboration
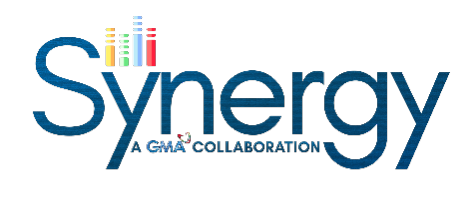
- Logo used since 2020
- Trade name: Synergy
- Type: Division
- Industry: Entertainment; Sports
- Founded: November 19, 2020; 6 years ago
- Headquarters: GMA Network Center, EDSA corner Timog Avenue, Diliman, Quezon City, Metro Manila, Philippines
- Area served: Worldwide
- Key people: Marivic Araneta (Officer In Charge and Senior Assistant Vice President and Deputy Head of Synergy)
- Products: Sporting events; Concerts; Live events
- Owner: GMA Regional TV
- Parent: GMA Network Inc.
- Website: gmanetwork.com/regionaltv/synergy

Synergy: A GMA Collaboration, also known as Synergy, is a division under GMA Regional TV that handles sports partnerships and production, concerts, non-ticketed events, and synergy for GMA. It is known for the coverage of NCAA Philippines, Limitless: A Musical Trilogy, and the first virtual reality concert, Alden's Reality.

==== GMA International ====
GMA International
- Type: Division
- Industry: Broadcasting
- Founded: March 14, 2005; 21 years ago
- Headquarters: GMA Network Center, EDSA corner Timog Avenue, Diliman, Quezon City, Metro Manila, Philippines
- Area served: Worldwide
- Key people: Felipe Gozon (chairman of the board and Adviser); Gilberto Duavit Jr. (president and CEO); Annette Gozon-Valdes (SVP)
- Products: Television channels; Radio stations; Web portals
- Services: Television; Radio; Internet; Streaming service
- Parent: GMA Network Inc.
- Website: gmanetwork.com/international

The international division of GMA Network that operates and distributes international channels in more than 150 countries and territories worldwide. In 2023, GMA Network Inc. and ABS-CBN International (a division of ABS-CBN Corporation) collaborated to air GMA Pinoy TV, GMA Life TV, GMA News TV, and some GMA On Demand programs on IWantTFC.

- GMA Pinoy TV
- GMA Life TV
- GMA News TV
- GMA On Demand
- Super Radyo DZBB (international)
- Barangay LS 97.1 (international)

==== GMA Public Affairs ====
A division of GMA Network that produces primarily public affairs, documentary, lifestyle, news magazine, and travel programs but now expanded in entertainment programs and film production. It is the most-awarded (along with GMA Integrated News) producer in the Philippines earning 4 George Foster Peabody Award and lot of local and international awards. It is currently headed by Nessa S. Valdellon. It is known for I-Witness, Kapuso Mo, Jessica Soho, Unang Hirit, and the 2023 MMFF award-winning film, Firefly.

==== GMA Worldwide ====
GMA Worldwide (Philippines) Inc.
- Trade name: GMA Worldwide
- Type: Subsidiary (1996–2019); Division (since 2020)
- Industry: Broadcast syndication
- Founded: 1996; 30 years ago
- Headquarters: GMA Network Center, EDSA corner Timog Avenue, Diliman, Quezon City, Metro Manila, Philippines
- Area served: Worldwide
- Key people: Felipe Gozon (Chairman of the Board and Adviser); Gilberto Duavit Jr. (President and CEO)
- Products: Television programs; Motion pictures
- Services: Film distribution; Film promotion; Television syndication
- Parent: GMA Network Inc.
- Website: gmanetwork.com/worldwide

A former subsidiary of the company which known as GMA Worldwide (Philippines) Inc. that became a division of the network that is responsible for licensing and distribution of the network's produced programs, as well as acquisition of programs from other countries. It has licensed over 100 titles in more than 26 countries worldwide at present.

==== Sparkle GMA Artist Center ====
The talent management division of the company founded on August 12, 1995. Its artists include Miguel Tanfelix, Barbie Forteza, and Heart Evangelista.

=== Subsidiaries ===
- GMA New Media Inc.
  - NMI Solutions
  - NMI Studios
  - MediaMerge Corporation
    - GMA News Online
    - GMA Network Portal
    - Kapuso Stream
  - Philippine Entertainment Portal Inc. (50%)
    - PEP.ph
    - SPIN.PH (Sports Interactive Network Philippines)
  - GMA Affordabox
  - GMA Now
- GMA Network Films Inc. (GMA Pictures)
  - Backyard Productions
- GMA Productions Inc. (GMA Music)
  - GMA Playlist
  - AltG Records
  - Spotlight Music Sessions
  - GMV Studios (partnership with Viva Records)
- Citynet Network Marketing and Productions Inc.
  - Script2010 Inc.
  - DWDB-TV
- Alta Productions Group Inc.
- GMA Ventures Inc.

=== Affiliates ===
- RGMA Network Inc. (GMA Radio) (49%)
  - Super Radyo DZBB 594khz
  - Barangay LS 97.1
  - Super Radyo Nationwide
  - Barangay FM
- Mont-Aire Realty and Development Corp. (49%)

=== Corporate social responsibility ===
- GMA Kapuso Foundation
- Kapwa Ko Mahal Ko Foundation
- GMA Action Center
