= List of analog television stations in the Philippines =

List of analog television authorizations in the Philippines

This is a list of analog television stations recorded by the National Telecommunications Commission (NTC) in its October 2026 broadcast-station roster. The NTC roster identifies the licensee, analog channel, location, and province, but does not provide callsigns, programming brands, launch dates, or confirmation that every listed authorization was actively broadcasting on the date of the roster. The NTC issued guidelines for the phased switch-off of analog television service in Mega Manila in November 2025. In July 2026, the commission said that November 22, 2026 (later January 15, 2027) was the target date for the Mega Manila analog switch-off; the rest of the country was to follow on a later timetable.

Currently, there are three major networks competing for bigger audience share; ABS-CBN Corporation under Advanced Media Broadcasting System and ZOE Broadcasting Network, GMA Network Inc. and TV5 Network Inc. and three government-owned networks; People's Television Network Inc., Radio Philippines Network Inc. (20% minority shares) and Intercontinental Broadcasting Corporation. Most free-to-air networks are popularly known by their flagship channels (e.g. RPN 9 and GMA 7 (both Manila) instead of simply Radio Philippines Network Inc. and GMA Network Inc. respectively). Analog television in the Philippines began to shut down on February 28, 2017, and is scheduled to complete by January 15, 2027 respectively in Mega Manila and on a later date in the rest of the Philippines. Currently, analog television broadcasting in the Philippines historically used the NTSC-M system.

== NTC's Frequency Allocations ==
These frequencies are used in Philippine Analog Television broadcasting.

Type	Band	Frequency	Usage
VHF	Band I	55.25 MHz~83.25 MHz	TV-2 to TV-4; TV-5 and TV-6 (Note: TV-6 operates in the VHF band (82–88 MHz), which is part of the traditional analog TV frequency allocation. However, since the country is transitioning to ISDB-T digital TV, the NTC has been reallocating VHF frequencies, and some lower VHF channels (like TV-6) might be repurposed for other services, such as FM radio expansion or digital TV multiplexing.)
VHF	Band III	175.25 MHz~211.25 MHz	TV-7 to TV-13
UHF	Band IV & V	513.25 MHz~693.25 MHz	TV-21 to TV-51

== NCR (National Capital Region) ==
=== Metro Manila (until January 15, 2027) ===
Callsign	Channel	Programming	Frequency	Owner	Launch
DZMV	2	ALLTV2	55.25 MHz	Advanced Media Broadcasting System, Inc.	(Note: September 13, 2022 (frequency used by ABS-CBN from 1969 to 1972 and September 14, 1986, to May 5, 2020; by BBC from 1973 to 1986).)
DWGT	4	PTV	67.25 MHz	People's Television Network, Inc.	(Note: February 2, 1974 (frequency used by ABS-CBN from 1969 to 1972))
DWET	5	TV5	77.25 MHz	TV5 Network, Inc.	(Note: July 1962/February 21, 1992)
DZBB	7	GMA	175.25 MHz	GMA Network, Inc.	(Note: October 29, 1961)
DZKB	9	RPTV	187.25 MHz	Radio Philippines Network, Inc.	(Note: October 15, 1969 (frequency used by CBN, now ABS-CBN from 1958 to 1969))
DZOE	11	A2Z	199.25 MHz	Zoe Broadcasting Network, Inc.	(Note: April 13, 1998/October 10, 2020 (frequency used by MBC from 1962 to 1972 and frequency used by DBS from 1995 to 1998))
DZTV	13	IBC	211.25 MHz	Intercontinental Broadcasting Corporation	(Note: March 1, 1960)
DZEC	25	NET25	537.25 MHz	Eagle Broadcasting Corporation	(Note: April 23, 2000 (frequency used by ACWS-UBN from 1999 to 2000))
DWDB	27	GTV	549.25 MHz	GMA Network, Inc.	(Note: August 27, 1995/June 4, 2019 (formerly branded as Citynet Television from 1995 to 1999, Entertainment Music Channel in 1999, Channel [V] Philippines from 1999 to 2001 and GMA News TV from 2019 to 2021))
DWNB	41	One Sports	633.25 MHz	Nation Broadcasting Corporation	(Note: January 1, 2001/February 21, 2011 (formerly MTV Philippines, AksyonTV and 5 Plus))
DZCE	48	INCTV	675.25 MHz	Christian Era Bctg. Service, Inc.	(Note: July 21, 2005/October 31, 2012 (on TV-49/681.25 MHz; shifted to current channel in 2017 to allow full-time simulcast with its digital signal))

== CAR (Cordillera Administrative Region) ==
=== Abra ===
Callsign	Channel	Programming	Frequency	Location	Owner
D-7-ZG	7	GMA	175.25 MHz	Peñarrubia	GMA Network, Inc.

=== Benguet ===
Callsign	Channel	Programming	Frequency	Location	Owner
DWAY	3	ALLTV2	61.25 MHz	Baguio	Advanced Media Broadcasting System, Inc.
D-8-XM	8	PTV	181.25 MHz	Mt. Santo Tomas	People's Television Network, Inc.
DZEA	10	GMA	193.25 MHz	Mt. Santo Tomas	GMA Network, Inc.
DZBS	12	RPTV	205.25 MHz	Mt. Santo Tomas	Radio Philippines Network, Inc.
DWDG	22	GTV	519.25 MHz	Mt. Santo Tomas	GMA Network, Inc.
DZET	28	TV5	555.25 MHz	Mt. Santo Tomas	TV5 Network, Inc. (ABC Development Corp.)
DZYB	36	One Sports	603.25 MHz	Baguio	Nation Broadcasting Corporation

=== Mountain Province ===
Callsign	Channel	Programming	Frequency	Location	Owner
DZVG	5	GMA	77.25 MHz	Mt. Amuyao	GMA Network, Inc.
PA	11	ALLTV2	199.25 MHz	Mt. Amuyao	Advanced Media Broadcasting System, Inc.

== Region I (Ilocos Region) ==
=== Ilocos Norte ===
Callsign	Channel	Programming	Frequency	Location	Owner
DWTE	2	TV5	55.25 MHz	Laoag	TV5 Network, Inc. (ABC Development Corp.)
D-5-AS	5	GMA	77.25 MHz	San Nicolas	GMA Network, Inc.
PA	7	ALLTV2	175.25 MHz	San Nicolas	Advanced Media Broadcasting System, Inc.
D-11-ZV	11	PTV	199.25 MHz	Batac	People's Television Network, Inc.
DWCS	13	IBC	211.25 MHz	Laoag	Intercontinental Broadcasting Corporation
DZHH	27	GTV	549.25 MHz	San Nicolas	GMA Network, Inc.

=== Ilocos Sur ===
Callsign	Channel	Programming	Frequency	Location	Owner
DWBC	48	GMA	675.25 MHz	Bantay	GMA Network, Inc.

== Region II (Cagayan Valley) ==
=== Batanes ===
Callsign	Channel	Programming	Frequency	Location	Owner
DWAZ	7	GMA	175.25 MHz	Basco	GMA Network, Inc.

=== Cagayan ===
Callsign	Channel	Programming	Frequency	Location	Owner
DWBB	7	GMA	175.25 MHz	Tuguegarao	GMA Network, Inc.
DZBB	13	GMA	211.25 MHz	Aparri	GMA Network, Inc.
DWGP	26	GTV	543.25 MHz	Aparri	GMA Network, Inc.
DWHK	27	GTV	549.25 MHz	Tuguegarao	GMA Network, Inc.
PA	39	TV5	621.25 MHz	Tuguegarao	Interactive Broadcast Media, Inc.

=== Isabela ===
Callsign	Channel	Programming	Frequency	Location	Owner
PA	2	ALLTV2	55.25 MHz	Santiago	Advanced Media Broadcasting System, Inc.
DWLE	7	GMA	175.25 MHz	Santiago	GMA Network, Inc.
DWDH	25	TV5	537.25 MHz	Santiago	Mediascape, Inc.

== Region III (Central Luzon) ==
=== Aurora ===
Callsign	Channel	Programming	Frequency	Location	Owner
D-5-ZB	5	GMA	77.25 MHz	Baler	GMA Network, Inc.

=== Tarlac ===
Callsign	Channel	Programming	Frequency	Location	Owner
PA	24	TV5	531.25 MHz	Tarlac City	Mediascape, Inc.
DWRP	26	RTV	543.25 MHz	Tarlac City	Radyo Pilipino Corporation

=== Zambales ===
Callsign	Channel	Programming	Frequency	Location	Owner
DWNS	10	GMA	193.25 MHz	Olongapo	GMA Network, Inc.
PA	13	ALLTV2	211.25 MHz	Botolan	Advanced Media Broadcasting System, Inc.
DWRG	26	GTV	543.25 MHz	Olongapo	GMA Network, Inc.
PA	28	TV5	555.25 MHz	Olongapo	Interactive Broadcast Media, Inc.

== Region IV-A (CALABARZON) ==
=== Batangas ===
Callsign	Channel	Programming	Frequency	Location	Owner
DWAD	10	ALLTV2	193.25 MHz	Batangas City	Advanced Media Broadcasting System, Inc.
D-12-ZB	12	GMA	205.25 MHz	Mt. Banoy	GMA Network, Inc.
DWDK	26	GTV	543.25 MHz	Mt. Banoy	GMA Network, Inc.
PA	30	TV5	567.25 MHz	Batangas City	Interactive Broadcast Media, Inc.

=== Rizal ===
Callsign	Channel	Programming	Frequency	Location	Owner
DWJJ	44	GMA	651.25 MHz	Jalajala	GMA Network, Inc.

== Region IV-B (MIMAROPA) ==
=== Occidental Mindoro ===
Callsign	Channel	Programming	Frequency	Location	Owner
D-13-ZR	13	GMA	211.25 MHz	San Jose	GMA Network, Inc.
DWHJ	26	GTV	543.25 MHz	San Jose	GMA Network, Inc.
PA	34	TV5	591.25 MHz	San Jose	Mediascape, Inc.

=== Palawan ===
Callsign	Channel	Programming	Frequency	Location	Owner
DYGS	4	PTV	67.25 MHz	Puerto Princesa	People's Television Network, Inc.
DYAA	6	GMA	83.25 MHz	Brooke's Point	GMA Network, Inc.
DYPR	7	ALLTV2	175.25 MHz	Puerto Princesa	Palawan Broadcasting Corporation
DWRF	8	GMA	181.25 MHz	Coron	GMA Network, Inc.
DYPU	12	GMA	205.25 MHz	Puerto Princesa	GMA Network, Inc.
DWHI	27	GTV	549.25 MHz	Puerto Princesa	GMA Network, Inc.
DWDD	29	TV5	561.25 MHz	Puerto Princesa	Nation Broadcasting Corporation

=== Romblon ===
Callsign	Channel	Programming	Frequency	Location	Owner
DWTR	7	GMA	175.25 MHz	Tablas	GMA Network, Inc.

== Region V (Bicol Region) ==
=== Albay ===
Callsign	Channel	Programming	Frequency	Location	Owner
PA	4	ALLTV2	67.25 MHz	Legazpi	Advanced Media Broadcasting System, Inc.
DWLA	12	GMA	205.25 MHz	Legazpi	GMA Network, Inc.
DWJB	27	GTV	549.25 MHz	Legazpi	GMA Network, Inc.

=== Camarines Norte ===
Callsign	Channel	Programming	Frequency	Location	Owner
DWGC	8	GMA	181.25 MHz	Daet	GMA Network, Inc.

=== Camarines Sur ===
Callsign	Channel	Programming	Frequency	Location	Owner
DWLV	2	TV5	55.25 MHz	Naga	Bicol Broadcasting System, Inc.
DWMA	4	PTV	67.25 MHz	Naga	People's Television Network, Inc.
DWAI	7	GMA	175.25 MHz	Naga	GMA Network, Inc.
DWKI	10	RPTV	193.25 MHz	Iriga	Radio Philippines Network, Inc.
PA	11	ALLTV2	199.25 MHz	Naga	Advanced Media Broadcasting System, Inc.
DWNA	22	TV5	519.25 MHz	Naga	Nation Broadcasting Corporation
DZDP	28	GTV	555.25 MHz	Naga	GMA Network, Inc.
PA	40	One PH	627.25 MHz	Naga	Cignal TV, Inc. (Mediascape, Inc.)

=== Catanduanes ===
Callsign	Channel	Programming	Frequency	Location	Owner
D-13-ZC	13	GMA	211.25 MHz	Virac	GMA Network, Inc.

=== Masbate ===
Callsign	Channel	Programming	Frequency	Location	Owner
DYRD	7	GMA	175.25 MHz	Mobo	GMA Network, Inc.
DYHL	27	GTV	549.25 MHz	Mobo	GMA Network, Inc.

=== Sorsogon ===
Callsign	Channel	Programming	Frequency	Location	Owner
DWGA	2	GMA	55.25 MHz	Juban	GMA Network, Inc.

== Region VI (Western Visayas) ==
=== Aklan ===
Callsign	Channel	Programming	Frequency	Location	Owner
DYBB	2	GMA	55.25 MHz	Kalibo	GMA Network, Inc.
DXBL	27	GTV	549.25 MHz	Kalibo	GMA Network, Inc.
PA	41	TV5	633.25 MHz	Kalibo	Interactive Broadcast Media, Inc.

=== Capiz ===
Callsign	Channel	Programming	Frequency	Location	Owner
DYAM	5	GMA	77.25 MHz	Roxas	GMA Network, Inc.
DYBK	27	GTV	549.25 MHz	Roxas	GMA Network, Inc.

=== Guimaras ===
Callsign	Channel	Programming	Frequency	Location	Owner
DYDY	2	PTV	55.25 MHz	Jordan	People's Television Network, Inc.
DYXX	6	GMA	83.25 MHz	Jordan	GMA Network, Inc.

=== Iloilo ===
Callsign	Channel	Programming	Frequency	Location	Owner
PA	10	ALLTV2	193.25 MHz	Iloilo City	Advanced Media Broadcasting System, Inc.
DYKV	28	GTV	555.25 MHz	Iloilo City	GMA Network, Inc.
DYMB	36	TV5	603.25 MHz	Iloilo City	Cignal TV, Inc. (Mediascape, Inc.)

== NIR (Negros Island Region) ==
=== Negros Occidental ===
Callsign	Channel	Programming	Frequency	Location	Owner
DYAG	4	ALLTV2	67.25 MHz	Murcia	Advanced Media Broadcasting System, Inc.
DYKB	8	RPTV	181.25 MHz	Bacolod	Radio Philippines Network, Inc.
D-10-YA	10	GMA	193.25 MHz	Sipalay	GMA Network, Inc.
DWGM	13	GMA	211.25 MHz	Bacolod	GMA Network, Inc.
DYGM	30	GMA	567.25 MHz	Murcia	GMA Network, Inc.
DYTE	32	TV5	579.25 MHz	Bacolod	TV5 Network, Inc. (ABC Development Corp.)

=== Negros Oriental ===
Callsign	Channel	Programming	Frequency	Location	Owner
D-5-YB	5	GMA	77.25 MHz	Valencia	GMA Network, Inc.
D-10-YM	10	PTV	193.25 MHz	Dumaguete	People's Television Network, Inc.
PA	12	ALLTV2	205.25 MHz	Dumaguete	Advanced Media Broadcasting System, Inc.
DYBM	28	GTV	555.25 MHz	Valencia	GMA Network, Inc.

== Region VII (Central Visayas) ==
=== Bohol ===
Callsign	Channel	Programming	Frequency	Location	Owner
D-11-YE	11	GMA	199.25 MHz	Tagbilaran	GMA Network, Inc.

=== Cebu ===
Callsign	Channel	Programming	Frequency	Location	Owner
DYAE	3	ALLTV2	61.25 MHz	Cebu City	Advanced Media Broadcasting System, Inc.
DYSS	7	GMA	175.25 MHz	Cebu City	GMA Network, Inc.
DYKC	9	RPTV	187.25 MHz	Cebu City	Radio Philippines Network, Inc.
DYPT	11	PTV	199.25 MHz	Cebu City	People's Television Network, Inc.
DYTV	13	IBC	211.25 MHz	Cebu City	Intercontinental Broadcasting Corporation
DYET	21	TV5	513.25 MHz	Cebu City	TV5 Network, Inc. (ABC Development Corp.)
DYLS	27	GTV	549.25 MHz	Cebu City	GMA Network, Inc.
DYAN	29	RPTV	561.25 MHz	Cebu City	Nation Broadcasting Corporation

== Region VIII (Eastern Visayas) ==
=== Eastern Samar ===
Callsign	Channel	Programming	Frequency	Location	Owner
DYVB	8	GMA	181.25 MHz	Borongan	GMA Network, Inc.

=== Leyte ===
Callsign	Channel	Programming	Frequency	Location	Owner
PA	2	ALLTV2	55.25 MHz	Tacloban	Advanced Media Broadcasting System, Inc.
DYCL	10	GMA	193.25 MHz	Tacloban	GMA Network, Inc.
DYPR	12	A2Z	205.25 MHz	Tacloban	Philippine Collective Media Corporation
DYIL	12	GMA	205.25 MHz	Ormoc	GMA Network, Inc.
DYBJ	26	GTV	543.25 MHz	Tacloban	GMA Network, Inc.
PA	40	TV5	627.25 MHz	Tacloban	Palawan Broadcasting Corporation

=== Samar ===
Callsign	Channel	Programming	Frequency	Location	Owner
DYAS	5	GMA	77.25 MHz	Calbayog	GMA Network, Inc.
DYWP	12	PTV	205.25 MHz	Calbayog	People's Television Network, Inc.

== Region IX (Zamboanga Peninsula) ==
=== Sulu ===
Callsign	Channel	Programming	Frequency	Location	Owner
DXLS	12	GMA	205.25 MHz	Jolo	GMA Network, Inc.
DXGP	26	GTV	543.25 MHz	Jolo	GMA Network, Inc.

=== Zamboanga del Norte ===
Callsign	Channel	Programming	Frequency	Location	Owner
D-4-XT	4	GMA	67.25 MHz	Dipolog	GMA Network, Inc.
DXAV	26	GTV	543.25 MHz	Dipolog	GMA Network, Inc.

=== Zamboanga del Sur ===
Callsign	Channel	Programming	Frequency	Location	Owner
DXEJ	3	GMA	61.25 MHz	Pagadian	GMA Network, Inc.
PTV-11	11	PTV	199.25 MHz	Pagadian	People's Television Network, Inc.
DXAU	26	GTV	543.25 MHz	Pagadian	GMA Network, Inc.

=== Zamboanga Sibugay ===
Callsign	Channel	Programming	Frequency	Location	Owner
DXSI	11	PTV	199.25 MHz	Ipil	People's Television Network, Inc.

=== Zamboanga City ===
Callsign	Channel	Programming	Frequency	Owner
PA	3	ALLTV2	61.25 MHz	Advanced Media Broadcasting System, Inc.
DXXX	5	RPTV	77.25 MHz	Radio Philippines Network, Inc.
DXVC	7	PTV	175.25 MHz	People's Television Network, Inc.
DXLA	9	GMA	187.25 MHz	GMA Network, Inc.
DXGB	11	TV5	199.25 MHz	Golden Broadcast Professional, Inc.
DXVB	21	GTV	513.25 MHz	GMA Network, Inc.
DXDE	29	One Sports	561.25 MHz	ABC Development Corp.

== Region X (Northern Mindanao) ==
=== Bukidnon ===
Callsign	Channel	Programming	Frequency	Location	Owner
PA	2	ALLTV2	55.25 MHz	Mt. Kitanglad	Advanced Media Broadcasting System, Inc.
DXMK	12	GMA	205.25 MHz	Mt. Kitanglad	GMA Network, Inc.

=== Lanao del Norte ===
Callsign	Channel	Programming	Frequency	Location	Owner
PA	4	ALLTV2	67.25 MHz	Iligan	Advanced Media Broadcasting System, Inc.
DXRV	11	GMA	199.25 MHz	Iligan	GMA Network, Inc.

=== Misamis Occidental ===
Callsign	Channel	Programming	Frequency	Location	Owner
DXGM	5	GMA	77.25 MHz	Ozamiz	GMA Network, Inc.
DXAT	22	GTV	519.25 MHz	Ozamiz	GMA Network, Inc.

=== Misamis Oriental ===
Callsign	Channel	Programming	Frequency	Location	Owner
DXAL	4	ALLTV2	67.25 MHz	Cagayan de Oro	Advanced Media Broadcasting System, Inc.
DXCC	10	IBC	193.25 MHz	Cagayan de Oro	Intercontinental Broadcasting Corporation
DXTE	21	TV5	513.25 MHz	Cagayan de Oro	TV5 Network, Inc. (ABC Development Corp.)
DXCO	29	One Sports	561.25 MHz	Cagayan de Oro	Nation Broadcasting Corporation
DXJC	35	GMA	597.25 MHz	Cagayan de Oro	GMA Network, Inc.

== Region XI (Davao Region) ==
=== Davao del Norte ===
Callsign	Channel	Programming	Frequency	Location	Owner
DXPT	48	PTV	675.25 MHz	Tagum	People's Television Network, Inc.

=== Davao del Sur ===
Callsign	Channel	Programming	Frequency	Location	Owner
DXET	2	TV5	55.25 MHz	Davao City	TV5 Network, Inc. (ABC Development Corp.)
DXAK	4	ALLTV2	67.25 MHz	Davao City	Advanced Media Broadcasting System, Inc.
DXMJ	5	GMA	77.25 MHz	Davao City	GMA Network, Inc.
DXWW	9	RPTV	187.25 MHz	Davao City	Radio Philippines Network, Inc.
DXNP	11	PTV	199.25 MHz	Davao City	People's Television Network, Inc.
DXTV	13	IBC	211.25 MHz	Davao City	Intercontinental Broadcasting Corporation
DXRA	27	GTV	549.25 MHz	Davao City	GMA Network, Inc.
DXAN	29	RPTV	561.25 MHz	Davao City	Nation Broadcasting Corporation

== Region XII (SOCCSKSARGEN) ==
=== North Cotabato ===
Callsign	Channel	Programming	Frequency	Location	Owner
PA	8	PTV	181.25 MHz	Kidapawan	People's Television Network, Inc.

=== South Cotabato ===
Callsign	Channel	Programming	Frequency	Location	Owner
PA	3	ALLTV2	61.25 MHz	General Santos	Advanced Media Broadcasting System, Inc.
DXBG	8	GMA	181.25 MHz	General Santos	GMA Network, Inc.
DXER	12	TV5	205.25 MHz	General Santos	TV5 Network, Inc. (ABC Development Corp.)
PA	22	One Sports	519.25 MHz	General Santos	Nation Broadcasting Corporation
DXMP	26	GTV	543.25 MHz	General Santos	GMA Network, Inc.
DXBC	39	Brigada TV	621.25 MHz	General Santos	Baycomms Broadcasting Corporation

== Region XIII (Caraga) ==
=== Agusan del Norte ===
Callsign	Channel	Programming	Frequency	Location	Owner
PA	22	TV5	519.25 MHz	Butuan	TV5 Network, Inc.
DXBM	26	GMA	543.25 MHz	Butuan	GMA Network, Inc.

=== Agusan del Sur ===
Callsign	Channel	Programming	Frequency	Location	Owner
DXSK	32	PTV	579.25 MHz	Prosperidad	People's Television Network, Inc.

=== Surigao del Norte ===
Callsign	Channel	Programming	Frequency	Location	Owner
D-10-XA	10	GMA	193.25 MHz	Surigao City	GMA Network, Inc.
DXAW	27	GTV	549.25 MHz	Surigao City	GMA Network, Inc.

=== Surigao del Sur ===
Callsign	Channel	Programming	Frequency	Location	Owner
DXRC	2	GMA	55.25 MHz	Tandag	GMA Network, Inc.

== BARMM (Bangsamoro Autonomous Region in Muslim Mindanao) ==
=== Lanao del Sur ===
Callsign	Channel	Programming	Frequency	Location	Owner
PA	7	PTV	175.25 MHz	Marawi	People's Television Network, Inc.

=== Maguindanao del Norte ===
Callsign	Channel	Programming	Frequency	Location	Owner
PA	5	ALLTV2	77.25 MHz	Cotabato City	Advanced Media Broadcasting System, Inc.
DXAA	8	PTV	181.25 MHz	Cotabato City	People's Television Network, Inc.
DXNS	12	GMA	205.25 MHz	Cotabato City	GMA Network, Inc.
DXMB	27	GTV	549.25 MHz	Cotabato City	GMA Network, Inc.

=== Tawi-Tawi ===
Callsign	Channel	Programming	Frequency	Location	Owner
PA	4	PTV	67.25 MHz	Bongao	People's Television Network, Inc.

== See also ==
- Television in the Philippines
- Digital terrestrial television in the Philippines
- List of digital television stations in the Philippines
- List of radio stations in the Philippines
