= GMA 7 =

GMA 7 may refer to:

- GMA Network, a Philippine television network owned by GMA Holdings, Inc.
  - GMA Network Inc., PSE stock ticker GMA7
- Multiple GMA's regional stations broadcasting on channel 7, including:
  - DZBB-TV, Manila (GMA's flagship TV station)
  - D-7-ZG-TV, Abra
  - DWAI-TV, Naga
  - DYKD-TV, Masbate
  - DYSS-TV, Cebu
