= DZBB =

DZBB may refer to one of the following flagship GMA Network broadcasters in Metro Manila, Philippines:

- DZBB-AM, a radio station (594 AM), broadcasting as Super Radyo
- DZBB-TV, a television station (channel 7 analog and channel 15 digital), broadcasting as GMA 7
