= Balitang Southern Tagalog =

Philippine television news show

- Final card
- Genre: News broadcasting
- Directed by: Romwen Francis D. Adarlo
- Presented by: Ace Medrano
- Narrated by: Al Torres
- Country of origin: Philippines
- Original language: Tagalog

Production
- Executive producer: Marjorie Padua Hazel Alviar
- Production locations: GMA TV Batangas Complex, Batangas City
- Camera setup: Multiple-camera setup
- Running time: 30 minutes
- Production companies: GMA Regional TV; GMA Integrated News

Original release
- Network: GMA 12 Batangas
- Release: February 14, 2022 – August 30, 2024

Balitang Southern Tagalog (also known as GMA Regional TV Balitang Southern Tagalog; transl. Southern Tagalog News) is a Philippine regional news broadcasting television show broadcast by GMA Network in the Southern Tagalog region. It premiered on February 14, 2022. Medrano served as the final anchor of the newscast. This newscast concluded on August 30, 2024. The newscast aired from Monday to Friday at 5:10 PM to 5:40 PM on GMA TV-12 Batangas and relayed to GMA TV-44 Jalajala, GMA TV-13 Occidental Mindoro, & GMA TV-7 Romblon.

== Overview ==
The newscast, conceptualized and produced by GMA Regional TV and GMA News and Public Affairs, covered significant and comprehensive news reports, making it the 2nd regional news program delivered in Filipino, after One North Central Luzon.

The newscast covered news and features in Calabarzon and Mimaropa through the network's news teams from Batangas City and news stringers across the region.

The pilot episode of the newscast also marked the debut of GMA Batangas as an originating station.

The newscast aired from Monday to Friday from 5:10 PM to 5:40 PM on GMA TV-12 Batangas, GMA TV-44 Jalajala Rizal, GMA TV-7 Romblon, and GMA TV-13 Occidental Mindoro, with international broadcasts through GMA News TV.

== History ==
GMA Network began their preparations to build a regional hub for the Southern Tagalog region in 2021 and conceptualized a regional for the area.

It became the second GMA Regional TV newscast in Southern Luzon, after Bicol Region's Balitang Bicolandia, which premiered a year earlier. The newscast covered news and features in Calabarzon and Mimaropa through its news teams from Batangas City and news stringers across the region. It was the second regional news program delivered entirely in Filipino, after One North Central Luzon.

Since its pilot episode, the newscast was anchored by former TV Patrol Palawan anchor and CNN Philippines correspondent Ivy Saunar-Gasang and Ace Medrano, together with Andrew Bernardo (from TV Patrol Southern Tagalog), Lorenzo Ilagan, and Ilonah Manalo as the inaugural set of regional correspondents. Charm Ragiles from Balitang Bicolandia arrived later. Executive producer & supervising producer Dyan (pronounced "Dianne") Loquellano was also a correspondent of TV Patrol Southern Tagalog (Bernardo's colleague).

On April 29, 2022, GMA Batangas welcomed former TV Patrol Southern Tagalog host and correspondent Paul Hernandez (Bernardo's colleague in TV Patrol) on the newscast, replacing Ilonah Manalo.

Saunar-Gasang of Balitang Southern Tagalog from GMA Batangas in South Luzon was part of One of the Top Remaining News Anchors of GMA Regional TV newscasts. Alongside are Cris Zuñiga of One North Central Luzon from GMA Dagupan in North Central Luzon, Kate Delovieres of Balitang Bicolandia from GMA Naga in Bicol Region, Alan Domingo and Cecille Quibod-Castro of Balitang Bisdak from GMA Cebu in Central and Eastern Visayas, Gerthrode Charlotte Tan of One Western Visayas from GMA Iloilo in Western Visayas, and Sarah Hilomen-Velasco of One Mindanao from GMA Davao in Mindanao.

During the Eleksyon 2022 Special Coverage on May 9–10, the newscast aired a special morning edition called Balitang Southern Tagalog Early Edition.

On June 20, 2022, GMA Batangas joined the rotation of GMA Regional TV stations across the country in hosting GTV's national morning newscast Regional TV News, originally anchor Saunar-Gasang and Medrano serving as occasional anchor. This also marked the return of Ivy Saunar-Gasang to the national appearance after she left CNN Philippines.

On July 8, 2022, Russel Simorio, Balitang Amianan (now One North Central Luzon) news correspondent, was assigned by GMA Regional TV to make a brief reportorial stint with Balitang Southern Tagalog for 1 month. On August 22, 2022, Denise Hannah Mei Abante joined as a news correspondent for the newscast to replace Lorenzo Ilagan.

On September 5, 2022, on-screen graphics were updated across all GMA Regional TV-produced newscasts.

In May 2023, GMA Regional TV announced that all regional TV programs, including Balitang Southern Tagalog, will shift to a 16:9 widescreen format on July 3, 2023; however, it got pushed back to July 10, 2023.

On December 28, 2023, Balitang Southern Tagalog Co-Anchor Ivy Saunar-Gasang made her final appearance before she left the newscast. Effective January 1, 2024, Saunar-Gasang officially left the newscast, leaving Ace Medrano as the solo anchor of the newscast.

On August 30, 2024, Balitang Southern Tagalog and GMA Bicol's Balitang Bicolandia ceased live news production. The reason for axing of the programs mentioned was GMA Regional TV's cost-cutting measures.

== Area of Coverage ==
- Batangas and Batangas City
- Cavite and Trece Martires
- Laguna and Santa Cruz
- Quezon and Lucena City
- Rizal and Antipolo City
- Marinduque and Boac City
- Occidental Mindoro and Mamburao
- Oriental Mindoro and Calapan (also covered by Ratsada Balita)
- Palawan and Puerto Princesa
- Romblon and Romblon City (also covered by Ratsada Balita)

== Personalities ==
=== Final anchor ===
- Ace Medrano (Main anchor)

=== Final correspondents ===
- Marjorie Padua
- Hazel Cawaing-Alviar
- Paul Hernandez (Fill-in Anchor for Medrano)
- Denise Hannah Mei Abante

=== Former anchors and correspondents ===
- Ilonah Riego-Manalo
- Lorenzo Ilagan
- Russel Simorio
- Mark Lavarro
- Andrew Bernardo
- Dyan Loquellano
- Ivy Saunar-Gasang (Co-anchor)

== Final segments ==
- Alerto (Police reports)
- Bantay Panahon (Weather reports)
- Bantay Bagyo (Typhoon reports)
- Coronavirus Pandemic (COVID-19 reports)
- Health Alert (Public Health reports)
- Price Watch (Price reports)
- Hayop sa Balita (Animal reports)
- Balitang Barangay (Neighborhood reports)
- Dengue Watch (Dengue reports)
- Sports Synergy/GAME ON! (Sports reports)
- Extra (Features)
- Spotlight (Showbiz reports)
- Kwento ng Pilipino (Story reports)
- Good News (Feature reports)
- Kapuso Barangayan (Event reports)
- GMA RTV Presents (Special reports)
- #Spreadkindness (Profile reports)
- Ala Eats (Food reports)
- 'Yan ang Pinoy! (Talented reports)
- Sikat ka Ngay-on! (Viral News reports)
- Tara na Di-ne! (Travel reports)
- Balitang Agri (Agricultural reports)
- Exclusive (Exclusive reports)
- Kapuso sa Kalikasan (Environmental reports)
- Pyesta! (Festival reports)
- Showbits (Spotlight reports)
- Kapuso sa Pasko (Christmas reports)
