= DWGA-TV =

Television station in Juban, Sorsogon, Philippines

GMA TV-2 Sorsogon (DWGA-TV)
Relay of DZBB-TV
- Philippines
- Channels: Analog: 2 (VHF)
- Branding: GMA TV-2 Sorsogon

Programming
- Affiliations: GMA Network

Ownership
- Owner: GMA Network Inc.

History
- First air date: April 2013; 13 years ago (as a launch); February 1, 2021; 5 years ago (as a relaunch and originating station); August 30, 2024; 23 months ago (as a relay station of DZBB-TV)
- Last air date: April 24, 2015; 11 years ago (due to network-wide strategic streamlining and retrenchments, downgrading Channel 7 to a satellite relay station); August 30, 2024; 23 months ago (due to cost-cutting measures was downgraded into a relay (satellite-selling station))
- Call sign meaning: From "GMA"

Technical information
- Licensing authority: NTC
- Power: 2 kW TPO
- ERP: 10.627 kW
- Transmitter coordinates: 12°47′44.4″N 123°56′18.2″E

Links
- Website: gmanetwork.com

DWGA-TV (VHF Ch. 2) is a television station in Juban, Sorsogon, Philippines, airing programming from GMA Network. Owned and operated by the network's namesake corporate parent, the station maintains transmitter facilities atop Mount Bintacan in Barangay Maalo.

Although identifying as a separate station in its own right, DWGA-TV was considered a relay of DWAI-TV (channel 7) in Naga, Camarines Sur.

Prior to the station's startup by GMA, a channel 2 station, DWIB-TV, operated at Sorsogon from 1995 to 1999 as part of the government-owned Intercontinental Broadcasting Corporation (IBC-13).

== History ==
- April 2013 - After 16 years of disuse, channel 2 is restored to use as DWGA-TV under GMA Network Inc., where the company spent ₱28 million, carrying Bicol regional programs, which include Baretang Bikol (later 24 Oras Bikol) via off-air pick-up of DWLA-TV (GMA TV-12 Legazpi).
- April 24, 2015 - After GMA Network decided to cancel airing 24 Oras Bikol due to strategic streamlining undertaken by the network, the station downgraded as a relay of GMA Manila (DZBB-TV).
- February 1, 2021 - GMA Bicol re-upgraded as an originating station with the relaunching of their regional newscast Balitang Bicolandia simulcasting all GMA's Bicol stations including GMA Sorsogon. Later, due to the cancellation in 2024, it became a relay again through GMA Manila.

== GMA TV-2 Sorsogon former programs ==
=== Simulcast from GMA TV-7 Naga ===
- 24 Oras Bikol
- Balitang Bicolandia
- Baretang Bikol

== See also ==
- DWAI-TV
- List of GMA Network stations
