= DWGC =

DWGC may refer to:

- DWGC-TV, a Filipino television station based in Daet that is owned and operated by the GMA Network
- The Anglican Diocese of the Western Gulf Coast, a geographic diocese of the Anglican Church of North America that operates parishes in Texas and Louisiana.
