= D-12-ZB-TV =

Television station in Batangas, Philippines

GMA TV-12 Batangas (D-12-ZB-TV)
Relay of DZBB-TV
- Philippines
- City: Batangas City
- Channels: Analog: 12 (VHF); Digital: 32 (UHF) (ISDB-T) (test broadcast); Virtual: 12.01
- Branding: GMA TV-12 Batangas

Programming
- Subchannels: See list
- Network: GMA Network

Ownership
- Owner: GMA Network, Inc.
- Sister stations: DZDK-TV (GTV)

History
- First air date: April 2, 1983; 43 years ago (original launch); February 14, 2022; 4 years ago (as an originating regional TV station); August 30, 2024; 2 years ago (as a relay station of DZBB-TV)
- Last air date: August 30, 2024; 2 years ago (due to cost-cutting measures was downgraded into a relay (satellite-selling station))

Technical information
- Licensing authority: NTC
- Power: 5 kW TPO (analog/digital)
- ERP: 30 kW (analog/digital)
- Transmitter coordinates: 13°42′21″N 121°10′21″E

Links
- Website: gmanetwork.com

D-12-ZB-TV (channel 12) is a television station in Batangas, Philippines, airing programming from GMA Network. It is owned and operated by the network's namesake corporate parent alongside GTV outlet DZDK-TV (channel 26). Both stations maintain analog and digital transmitters located at Mount Banoy, Barangay Talumpok Silangan, Batangas City, with its digital single-frequency network (SFN) relay station at Barangay San Jose, San Pablo, Laguna.

In 2021, GMA planned to upgrade GMA Batangas to an originating station located at PNG Building, P. Burgos Street corner Rizal Avenue, Batangas City. In 2022, GMA revealed the name of the flagship Filipino-language newscast of GMA Batangas, which launched on February 14, 2022, entitled Balitang Southern Tagalog.

On August 30, 2024, due to cost-cutting measures, GMA Batangas, along with GMA Bicol, was downgraded into a relay (satellite-selling station) and Balitang Southern Tagalog aired its final broadcast for more than 2 years.

== GMA TV-12 Batangas previously aired programs ==
- Balitang Southern Tagalog
- Word of God Network

== Digital television ==
=== Digital channels ===
D-12-ZB-TV's digital signal operates on UHF channel 32 (581.143 MHz) and broadcasts on the following subchannels:

Channel	Video	Aspect	Short name	Programming	Note
12.01	480i	4:3	GMA	GMA Batangas (relay stations of DZBB-TV)	Commercial broadcast (5 kW)
12.02	480i	4:3	GTV	GTV	Commercial broadcast (5 kW)
12.03	480i	4:3	HEART OF ASIA	Heart of Asia	Commercial broadcast (5 kW)
12.06	480i	4:3	I HEART MOVIES	I Heart Movies	Commercial broadcast (5 kW)
12.21	240p	4:3	GMA 1Seg	GMA Batangas Relay	1seg broadcast

== Area of coverage ==
- Batangas (including Batangas City, Lipa City, Padre Garcia and Rosario)
- Portion of Cavite (including Tagaytay City)
- Portion of Laguna (including San Pablo City)
- Portion of Quezon Province (including Lucena City)
- Portion of Marinduque
- Portion of Oriental Mindoro (including Puerto Galera and Calapan City)
- Portion of Romblon (minorly)

== See also ==
- DZBB-TV
- List of GMA Network stations
