= DWCW =

Radio station in Legazpi, Philippines

Barangay LS Legazpi (DWCW)
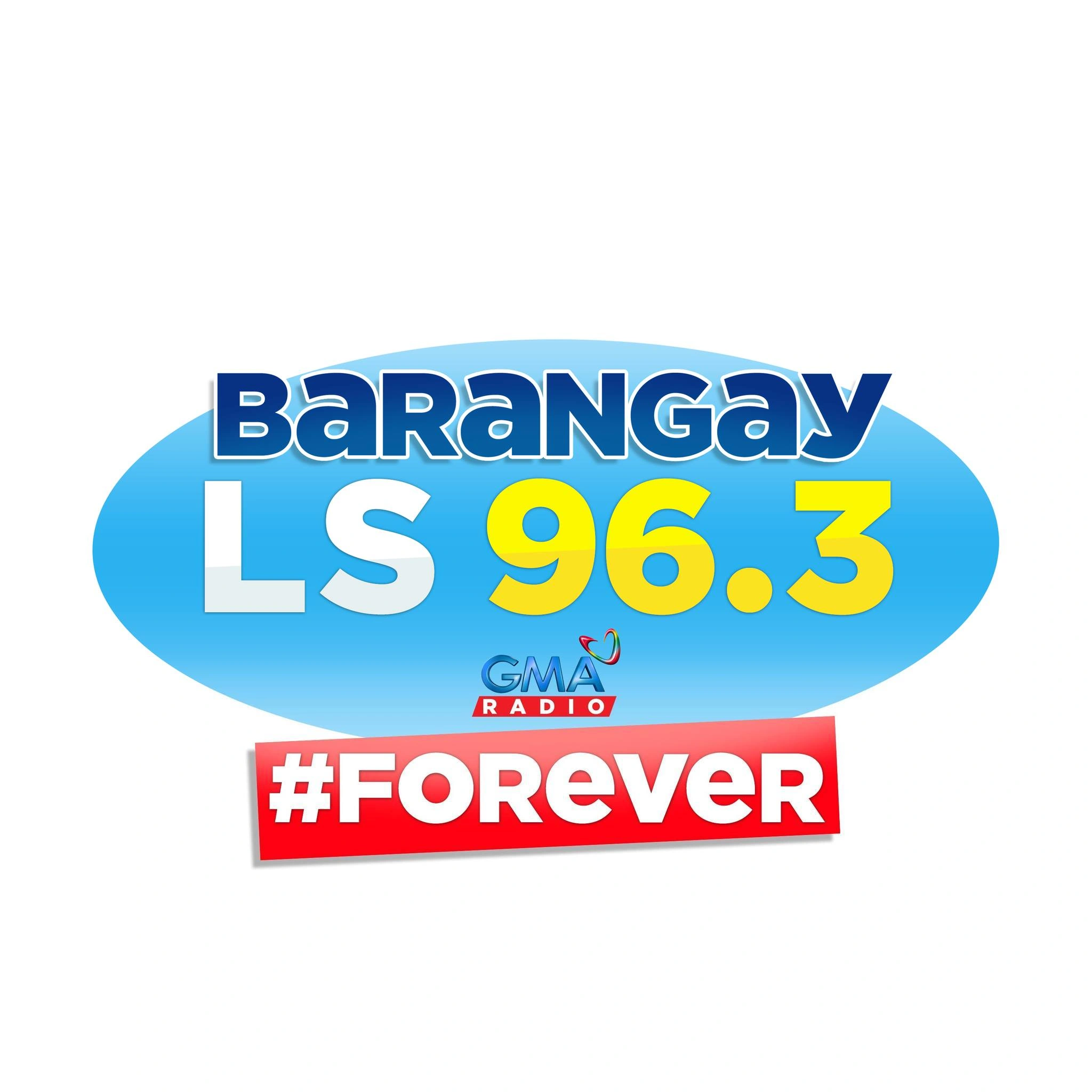
- Legazpi; Philippines
- Broadcast area: Albay and surrounding areas
- Frequency: 96.3 MHz
- Branding: Barangay LS 96.3

Programming
- Languages: Albayanon, Filipino
- Format: Contemporary MOR, OPM
- Network: Barangay LS

Ownership
- Owner: GMA Network Inc.
- Sister stations: GMA TV-12 Legazpi; GTV 27 Legazpi

History
- First air date: September 13, 1997
- Former names: Campus Radio (September 13, 1997-February 16, 2014)

Technical information
- Licensing authority: NTC
- Power: 10,000 watts

Links
- Website: www.gmanetwork.com

DWCW (96.3 FM), broadcasting as Barangay LS 96.3, is a radio station owned and operated by GMA Network. The station's studio and transmitter are located at the 3rd. Level, A. Bichara Silverscreens Entertainment Center, Magallanes St. cor. T. Alonzo St., Brgy. Oro Site, Legazpi, Albay.
