= DWWG =

Big Sound FM Cabanatuan (DWWG)
- Cabanatuan; Philippines
- Broadcast area: Nueva Ecija and surrounding areas
- Frequency: 101.5 MHz
- Branding: 101.5 Big Sound FM

Programming
- Language: Filipino
- Format: Contemporary MOR, OPM
- Network: Big Sound FM

Ownership
- Owner: Vanguard Radio Network
- Sister stations: 1188 DZXO

History
- First air date: 1981

Technical information
- Licensing authority: NTC
- Class: C, D, E
- Power: 5,000 watts
- ERP: 15,000 watts

DWWG (101.5 FM), broadcasting as 101.5 Big Sound FM, is a radio station owned and operated by Vanguard Radio Network. It serves as the flagship station of the Big Sound FM network. The station's studio and transmitter are located along Pan-Philippine Highway, Brgy. Sangitan East, Cabanatuan. This is the pioneer FM station in the city.
