= DWJJ-TV =

Television station in Jalajala, Philippines

GMA TV-44 Jalajala, Rizal (DWJJ-TV)
Relay of DZBB-TV
- Philippines
- Channels: Analog: 44 (UHF); Digital: 15 (UHF)
- Branding: GMA TV-44 Rizal

Programming
- Network: GMA Network

Ownership
- Owner: GMA Network Inc.

History
- First air date: June 2011; 15 years ago
- Call sign meaning: Jala-Jala

Technical information
- Licensing authority: NTC
- Power: 3 kW TPO (analog)
- Transmitter coordinates: 14°20′13″N 121°19′45″E

Links
- Website: GMANetwork.com

DWJJ-TV (UHF channel 44) is a Philippine local television station owned by GMA Network, Inc. Its transmitter is located atop Mount Landing, Jalajala, Rizal. This station primarily caters for audiences mainly from the provinces of Rizal and Laguna through an ultra-high frequency band. Since May 2024, the transmitter station is also used as a single-frequency network relay for GMA Manila (DZBB-TV) through DTT UHF channel 15.

== Digital television ==
=== Digital channels ===
DWJJ-TV's digital signal operates on UHF channel 15 (479.143 MHz) and broadcasts on the following subchannels:

Channel	Video	Aspect	Short name	Programming	Note	Power kW (ERP)
7.01	480i	4:3	GMA	GMA Jala-jala (Main DZBB-TV programming)	Commercial broadcast	(5 kW; 3 kW ERP
7.02	480i	4:3	GTV	GTV (Main DWDB-TV programming)	Commercial broadcast	(5 kW; 3 kW ERP
7.03	480i	4:3	HEART OF ASIA	Heart of Asia	Commercial broadcast	(5 kW; 3 kW ERP
7.06	480i	4:3	I HEART MOVIES	I Heart Movies	Commercial broadcast	(5 kW; 3 kW ERP
7.07	480i	4:3	(UNNAMED)	Reserved Channel	Color bars	(5 kW; 3 kW ERP
7.08	480i	4:3	(UNNAMED)	Reserved Channel	Color bars	(5 kW; 3 kW ERP
7.11	480i	4:3	(UNNAMED)	Reserved Channel	Color bars	(5 kW; 3 kW ERP
7.21	240p	4:3	GMA 1-Seg	GMA Jala-jala Relay	1seg	(5 kW; 3 kW ERP

== GMA TV-44 Jalajala former programs ==
- Balitang Southern Tagalog

== See also ==
- DZBB-TV
- List of GMA Network stations
