= DZXO =

Philippine radio station

- Cabanatuan; Philippines
- Broadcast area: Nueva Ecija and surrounding areas
- Frequency: 1188 kHz
- Branding: 1188 DZXO

Programming
- Language: Filipino
- Format: News, Public Affairs, Talk

Ownership
- Owner: Vanguard Radio Network
- Sister stations: 101.5 Big Sound FM

History
- First air date: 1969

Technical information
- Licensing authority: NTC
- Class: C, D, E
- Power: 5,000 watts

DZXO (1188 AM) is a radio station owned and operated by Vanguard Radio Network. The station's studio and transmitter are located along Pan-Philippine Highway, Brgy. Sangitan East, Cabanatuan. DZXO is the pioneer AM station in the province.
