= DWQW =

Radio station in Naga, Camarines Sur, Philippines

Barangay LS Naga (DWQW)
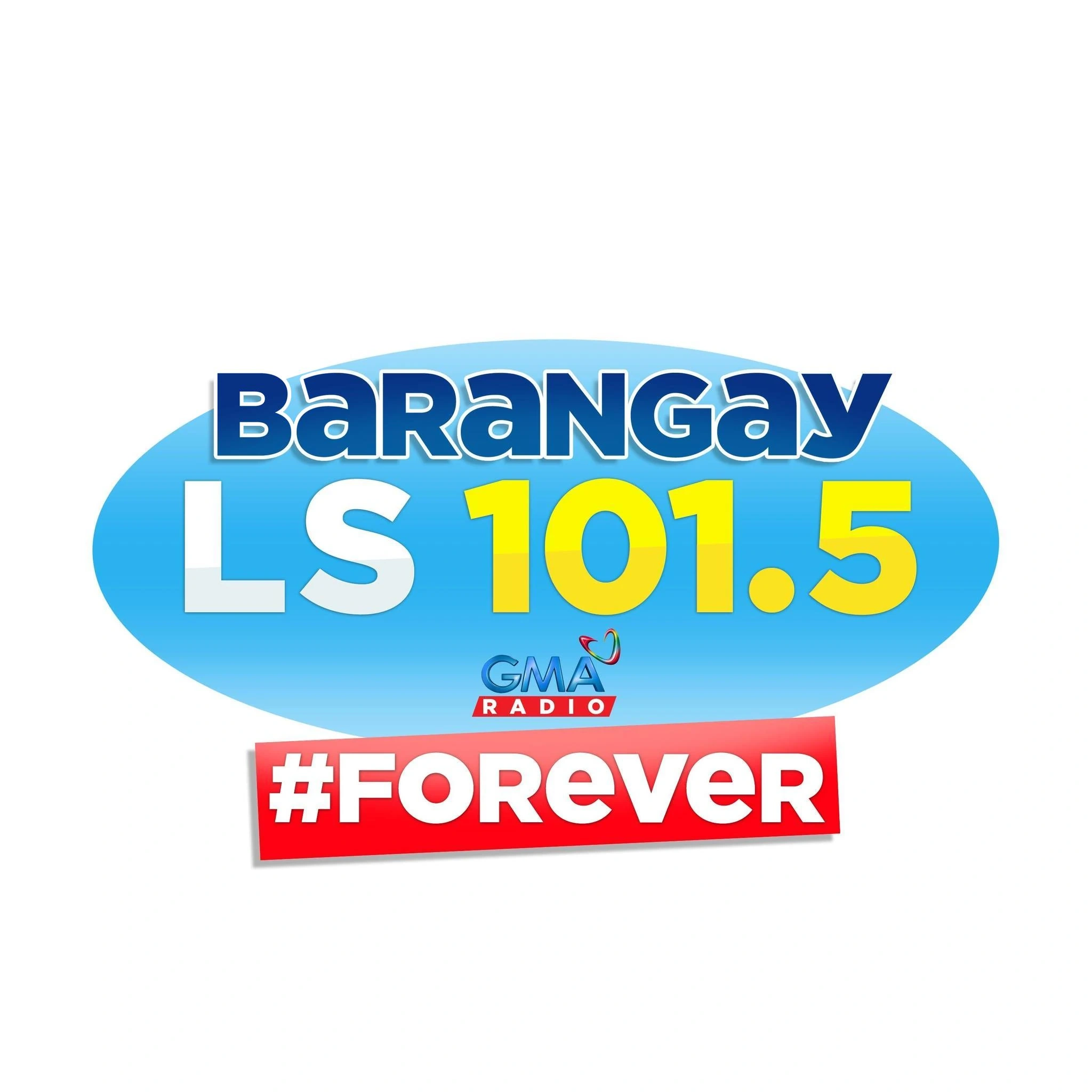
- Naga; Philippines
- Broadcast area: Camarines Sur and surrounding areas
- RDS: Barangay
- Branding: Barangay LS 101.5

Programming
- Languages: Bicolano, Filipino
- Format: Contemporary MOR, OPM
- Network: Barangay LS

Ownership
- Owner: GMA Network Inc.
- Sister stations: GMA TV-7 Naga; GTV 28 Naga

History
- First air date: 1998
- Former names: Campus Radio (1998-2014)

Technical information
- Licensing authority: NTC
- Power: 5,000 watts
- ERP: 21,000 watts

Links
- Website: www.gmanetwork.com

Barangay FM 101.5 logo from 2017 to 2019

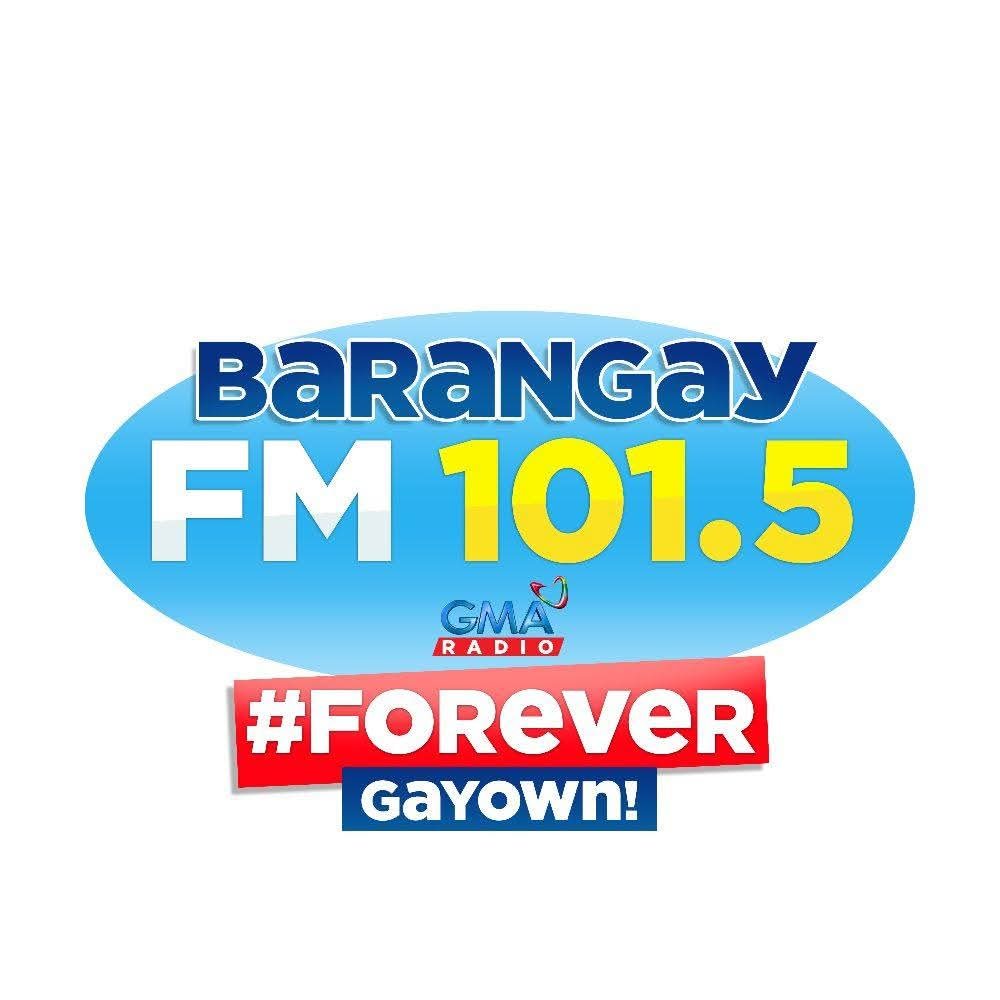
Barangay FM 101.5 logo from 2025 to 2026

DWQW (101.5 FM), broadcasting as Barangay LS 101.5, is a radio station owned and operated by GMA Network. The station's studio and transmitter are located at the GMA Broadcast Complex, Roxas Ave., Brgy. Concepcion Pequeña, Naga, Camarines Sur.
