= D-13-ZC-TV =

GMA TV-13 Catanduanes (D-13-ZC-TV)
Relay of DZBB-TV
- Virac, Catanduanes; Philippines
- Channels: Analog: 13 (VHF)
- Branding: GMA TV-13 Catanduanes

Ownership
- Owner: GMA Network Inc.

History
- First air date: 1992; 34 years ago (original launch); 2009; 17 years ago (as an originating station); February 1, 2021; 5 years ago (as a relaunch and originating station); August 30, 2024; 2 years ago (as a relay station of DZBB-TV)
- Last air date: April 24, 2015; 11 years ago (due to network-wide strategic streamlining and retrenchments, downgrading Channel 7 to a satellite relay station); August 30, 2024; 2 years ago (due to cost-cutting measures was downgraded into a relay (satellite-selling station))
- Former channel number: 10

Technical information
- Licensing authority: NTC
- Power: 2 kW
- Repeater: see § Rebroadcasters

Links
- Website: GMANetwork.com

D-13-ZC-TV (channel 13) is a television station in Virac, Catanduanes, Philippines, airing programming from the GMA Network. Owned and operated by the network's namesake corporate parent, the station maintains transmitter facilities at Brgy. Sto. Niño, Virac, Catanduanes.

Although identifying as a separate station in its own right, D-13-ZC-TV was considered a straight simulcast of DWAI-TV (channel 7) in Naga City until August 30, 2024, when it became a repeater of the flagship DZBB-TV in Metro Manila the following day.

== GMA TV-13 Catanduanes former programs ==
- Balitang Bicolandia

== See also ==
- List of GMA Network stations
