= DWBG =

Radio station in Baguio, Philippines

Big Sound FM Baguio (DWBG)
- Baguio; Philippines
- Broadcast area: Benguet, La Union and surrounding areas
- Frequency: 95.9 MHz
- Branding: 95.9 Big Sound FM

Programming
- Languages: Ilocano, Filipino
- Format: Contemporary MOR, OPM
- Network: Big Sound FM

Ownership
- Owner: Capricom Production and Management
- Operator: Vanguard Radio Network

History
- First air date: 1994
- Call sign meaning: Baguio

Technical information
- Licensing authority: NTC
- Power: 5,000 watts

DWBG (95.9 FM), broadcasting as 95.9 Big Sound FM, is a radio station owned by Capricom Production and Management and operated by Vanguard Radio Network. The station's studio and transmitter are located at #214B Tin St., Brgy. Upper Quezon Hill, Baguio.

== History ==
The station was established in 1994 as Big FM. It was formerly located along Second Road, Quezon Hill Proper before moving to the roof deck of Abanao Square along Abanao St. cor. Zandueta St. a few years later. In January 2007, it went off the air. It returned to air in 2013, this time as Big Sound FM under the management of Vanguard Radio Network.
