= DWMG =

Philippine radio station

- Solano; Philippines
- Broadcast area: Nueva Vizcaya and Quirino
- Frequency: 1395 kHz
- Branding: 1395 DWMG

Programming
- Languages: Ilocano, Filipino
- Format: News, Public Affairs, Talk

Ownership
- Owner: Vanguard Radio Network
- Sister stations: 101.3 Big Sound FM

History
- First air date: 1969
- Call sign meaning: Manuel Galvez

Technical information
- Licensing authority: NTC
- Power: 5,000 watts

DWMG (1395 AM) is a radio station owned and operated by Vanguard Radio Network. The station's studio and transmitter are located at J. P. Rizal St., Solano, Nueva Vizcaya. DWMG is the pioneer AM station in the province.
