= DYAM-TV =

Television station in Roxas City, Philippines

GMA TV-5 Roxas (DYAM-TV)
Relay of DYXX-TV
- Philippines
- City: Roxas City, Capiz
- Channels: Analog: 5 (VHF); Digital: 15 (UHF) (ISDB-T); Virtual: 5.01
- Branding: GMA TV-5 Roxas

Programming
- Subchannels: See list

Ownership
- Owner: GMA Network Inc.
- Sister stations: DYBK-TV (GTV)

History
- Founded: 1994

Technical information
- Licensing authority: NTC
- Power: Analog: 2 kW; Digital: 5 kW
- ERP: 5.39 kW
- Transmitter coordinates: 11°33′38″N 122°45′44″E

Links
- Website: gmanetwork.com

DYAM-TV (channel 5) is a local television station in Roxas City, Philippines airing programming from GMA Manila It is owned and operated by the network's namesake corporate parent alongside GTV outlet DYBK-TV (UHF Channel 27). Both stations share transmitter facilities at Mission Hills, Barangay Milibili

== History ==
- 1994 - GMA began in Roxas, Capiz, on Channel 5 after GMA 2 Kalibo's 2001 launch relay of DZBB-TV GMA Manila.
- October 4, 1999 - Launch Ratsada in GMA Iloilo simulcast by DYSI 1323 kHz, GMA Kalibo, and GMA Capiz.
- November 13, 2015 - Final episode of Ratsada including GMA Kalibo, GMA Capiz, GMA Iloilo, GMA Bacolod, and Barangay RU Super Radyo 92.9 Kalibo, downgrading the relay station station that broadcasts Metro Manila programs via DZBB-TV.
- August 27, 2018 - GMA Iloilo launch One Western Visayas simulcast by GMA Capiz, GMA Kalibo, and Barangay RU 92.9 Kalibo.

== GMA TV-5 Roxas current programs ==
- Ratsada Balita

== GMA TV-5 Roxas former programs ==
- GMA Regional TV Early Edition
- One Western Visayas

== Subchannels ==
DYAM-TV's digital signal operates via UHF Channel 15 (479.143 MHz), and broadcasts on the following subchannels:

Subchannels of DYAM-DTV
Channel	Res.	Short name	Programming
05.01	480i	GMA	GMA Roxas
05.02	480i	GTV	GTV
05.03	480i	HEART OF ASIA	Heart of Asia
05.04	480i	I HEART MOVIES	I Heart Movies
05.31	240p	GMA 1SEG	GMA Roxas Relay

== See also ==
- List of GMA Network stations
