= DWDC =

Philippine radio station

Big Sound FM Bayombong (DWDC)
Solano; Philippines
- Broadcast area: Nueva Vizcaya and surrounding areas
- Frequency: 101.3 MHz
- Branding: 101.3 Big Sound FM

Programming
- Languages: Ilocano, Filipino
- Format: Contemporary MOR, OPM
- Network: Big Sound FM

Ownership
- Owner: Vanguard Radio Network
- Sister stations: 1395 DWMG

History
- First air date: 1988

Technical information
- Licensing authority: NTC
- Power: 1,000 watts

DWDC (101.3 FM), broadcasting as 101.3 Big Sound FM, is a radio station owned and operated by Vanguard Radio Network. The station's studio and transmitter are located along J. P. Rizal St., Solano, Nueva Vizcaya. This is the pioneer FM station in the province.
