= Balitang Bicolandia =

Philippine television news show

- Final card
- Genre: News broadcasting
- Directed by: Paulo A. Santos
- Presented by: Kate Delovieres
- Narrated by: Al Torres
- Country of origin: Philippines
- Original languages: Bicolano; Tagalog (interviewees in Camarines Norte and Camarines Sur)

Production
- Executive producers: Mary Dawn A. Jimenez; Randy Pangilinan
- Producer: Mets M. Camo
- Production locations: GMA TV Bicol Complex, Concepcion Pequena, Naga, Camarines Sur
- Editors: Winson T. Escolano; Edgar LL. Calwit
- Camera setup: Multiple-camera setup
- Running time: 30–45 minutes
- Production companies: GMA Regional TV; GMA Integrated News

Original release
- Network: GMA 7 Naga
- Release: September 17, 2012 – April 24, 2015
- Network: GMA 7 Naga
- Release: February 1, 2021 – August 30, 2024

Balitang Bicolandia (also known as GMA Regional TV Balitang Bicolandia; transl. Bicolandia News), formerly known as Baretang Bikol and 24 Oras Bikol, is a Philippine television news broadcasting show broadcast by GMA Bicol. Originally anchored by Elmer Caseles, it premiered on September 17, 2012, replacing Bicolandia Isyu Ngonian. Kate Delovieres served as the final anchor of the newscast. The newscast concluded on August 30, 2024.

== Overview ==
The newscast covered the most significant news and features in the Bicol Region through the network's news teams from Naga City and news stringers across the region. It also marked the return of GMA Bicol as an originating station, almost six years after it was closed down due to mass layoffs and financial difficulties brought about by the streamlining of GMA Regional TV's operations, thus resulting in the Southern Luzon stations broadcasting the entire national programming lineup from GMA Channel 7 Manila. Before the newscast's launch, GMA Regional TV already had its news team reporting and anchors for the national GMA Regional TV Weekend News (later Regional TV Weekend News now Regional TV News), as well as in other local news programs of the network.

Balitang Bicolandia aired from Monday to Friday from 5:10 PM to 5:40 PM on GMA Naga (TV-7) with a simulcast over TV-12 Legazpi, TV-8 Daet, TV-2 Sorsogon, TV-13 Catanduanes, and TV-7 Masbate. It was also reaired for national viewers under GTV's late-night block "Regional TV Strip" every week, every Friday at 11:50 PM, replacing the RTV Morning Programs (from February 1 to July 23, 2021).

The program also aired worldwide on GMA News TV.

== History ==
=== 2010-2012: Pre-launch ===
Before the launch of the newscast, GMA Bicol aired Flash Bulletin, a daily news bulletin program aired several times from Monday to Friday from September 10, 2010, in order to provide local news, significantly during the Peñafrancia Festival. It was followed by the launch of another daily program, Isyu Ngonian, on November 22 of the same year.

=== 2012-2014: As Baretang Bikol ===
The newscast was launched on September 17, 2012, several weeks after the launch of GMA Bicol as an originating station, and expanded its coverage to the entire Bicol region. Its main anchor, Elmer Caseles, used to anchor the two preceding programs of the regional station.

=== 2014-2015: As 24 Oras Bikol ===
Titlecard as 24 Oras Bikol from November 10, 2014 to April 24, 2015.

Following changes in now-main newscast 24 Oras, Baretang Bikol was rebranded as 24 Oras Bikol since November 10, 2014. However, the newscast was suddenly got cancelled after more than two years of broadcast (opposite GMA Ilocos' 24 Oras Ilokano, formerly Balitang Ilokano, which aired in June 2012) due to the strategic streamlining happened to all provincial stations of the network. Following the cancellation was the retrenchment of its staff and personalities and the closure of the network's regional news department.

=== 2021-2024: As Balitang Bicolandia ===
Six years after 24 Oras Bikol was cancelled, GMA Naga returned as an originating station with the launching of the new newscast, Balitang Bicolandia. Launched on February 1, 2021, the newscast marked the return of GMA Naga as an originating station, almost six years after it was reduced to a relay station of GMA 7 Manila due to mass layoffs and financial difficulties brought about by the streamlining of GMA Regional TV's operations. This is produced by the GMA Naga station, which, before the initial closure of their news departments, aired separate news programs, 24 Oras Bikol (formerly Baretang Bikol) and Bicolandia Isyu Ngonian, respectively. Katherine Henry, Jessie Cruzat, and Rhayne Palino were its first anchors.

In late July, Katherine Henry left the newscast for health reasons and also ran for politics and was elected as the City Councilor of Iriga, Camarines Sur, leaving Palino and Cruzat as the remaining anchors. Cruzat became the solo anchor of the program several months later. Co-anchor and former ABS-CBN correspondent Kate Delovieres replaced both Henry and Palino, joining Cruzat in the anchor team.

During Eleksyon 2022 Special Coverage, Balitang Bicolandia Early Edition had a soft launch from May 9–10.

On August 1, 2023, Cruzat announced that he would be having his final appearance as the program's anchor, leaving Delovieres as the solo anchor. With that, she became the first female solo anchor in a GMA RTV newscast in the present day.

On August 30, 2024, Balitang Bicolandia and GMA Batangas' Balitang Southern Tagalog ceased live news production. The reason for axing of the programs mentioned was GMA Regional TV's cost-cutting measures.

== Personalities ==
=== Final anchors ===
==== As Balitang Bicolandia ====
- Kate Delovieres

==== As Baretang Bikol and 24 Oras Bikol ====
- Elmer Caseles

=== Final Correspondents ===
==== As Balitang Bicolandia ====
- Chariza Pagtalunan-Olivares
- Mary Dawn Jimenez
- Rosie Nieva
- Jessica Calinog
- Cris Novelo

==== As Baretang Bikol and 24 Oras Bikol ====
- Avril Daja
- Mark Bongat
- Kaye Botastas
- Chariza Pagtalunan
- Michelle Chua
- Maila Aycocho
- Michael Biando

=== Former anchors and correspondents ===
- Katherine Henry
- Rhayne Palino
- Charm Ragiles
- Veblen Reynes
- Jessie Cruzat
- Michael Jaucian

== Final segments ==
- Alerto Bicolandia
- Kamugtakan Kan Panahon
- Pasyaran Ta
- Oragon
- #Spreadkindness
- Coronavirus Pandemic Watch
- Baretang Barangay
- Agri Bareta
- Viral na ni
- Aking Bicolandia
- Pet-Malu / Hayop sa Balita
- Exclusive
- Kapuso sa Kalikasan
- Namitan Ta
- Kapuso Barangayan on Wheels
- RTV Presents
- G na G
- Showbits
- Baretang Salud
- Market Watch
- Time Out
- Good News
- Sports Synergy
