= DWLA-TV =

Television station in Legazpi, Albay, Philippines

DWLA-TV (GMA TV-12 Legazpi)
Relay of DZBB-TV
- Philippines
- City: Legazpi, Albay
- Channels: Analog: 12 (VHF); Digital: 41 (UHF) (ISDB-T) (test broadcast); Virtual: 12.01
- Branding: GMA TV-12 Legazpi

Programming
- Subchannels: See list

Ownership
- Owner: GMA Network Inc.
- Sister stations: DWJB-TV (GTV); Barangay LS 96.3 Legazpi

History
- First air date: 1978; 48 years ago (original launch); 2009; 17 years ago (as an originating station); February 1, 2021; 5 years ago (as a relaunch and originating station); August 30, 2024; 2 years ago (as a relay station of DZBB-TV)
- Last air date: April 24, 2015; 11 years ago (due to network-wide strategic streamlining and retrenchments, downgrading Channel 7 to a satellite relay station); August 30, 2024; 2 years ago (due to cost-cutting measures was downgraded into a relay (satellite-selling station))

Technical information
- Licensing authority: NTC
- Power: 10 kW (analog/digital)
- ERP: 39.95 kW (analog)

Links
- Website: gmanetwork.com

DWLA-TV (channel 12) is a television station in Legazpi City, Albay, Philippines, airing programming from the GMA network. It is owned and operated by the network's namesake corporate parent alongside GTV outlet DWJB-TV (channel 27). Both stations share transmitter facilities atop Mount Bariw at Barangay Estanza.

Although identifying as a separate station in its own right, DWLA-TV was considered a satellite station of DWAI-TV (channel 7) in Naga City.

== History ==
- February 1978 - DWLA-TV channel 12, the first television station in the Bicol Region, was launched by GMA Network's predecessor Republic Broadcasting System along with the introduction of its GMA Radio-Television Arts ident. It also had a Circle 12 logo in use, in its final years the blue circle 12 logo used was similar to those used by the ABC in some United States cities and later used the rainbow colors of red, yellow, green and blue stripes. Back then, it was known as Imperial 12.
- April 30, 1992 - DWLA-TV officially debuted its Rainbow Satellite Network, the ident served as a relay station of the network's flagship station DZBB-TV Channel 7 Manila to viewers in Albay and the Bicol Region with the utilizes a new logo to correspond with the rebranding and a satellite-beaming rainbow in a multicolored striped based on a traditional scheme of red, orange, green, yellow, blue, indigo and violet, with GMA in a metallic form uses a San Serif Century Gothic Extra Bold and analogous gloominess of indigo as its fonts in the letters.
- May 16, 1996 - Republic Broadcasting System formally changed its corporate name to GMA Network Incorporated, with GMA now standing for Global Media Arts.
- August 10, 2012 - GMA Naga and Legazpi were upgraded to a "super station" and it was called GMA Bicol in its branding, which primarily covers the provinces of Camarines Sur (via Channel 7) and Albay (via Channel 12).
- September 17, 2012 – November 7, 2014 - GMA Bicol launched its flagship local newscast Baretang Bikol.
- November 10, 2014 - GMA Bicol re-launched its flagship local newscast 24 Oras Bikol.
- April 24, 2015 - GMA Network decided to cancel airing 24 Oras Bikol as part of the strategic streamlining undertaken by the network. The Bicol stations were now downgraded as a relay (satellite-selling) station.
- February 1, 2021 - GMA Bicol will re-upgrade as an originating station with the relaunching of their regional newscast Balitang Bicolandia covered into the following areas of coverage: Camarines Sur, Albay, Catanduanes, Sorsogon, Masbate and Camarines Norte. However by August 30, 2024 it aired its final episode.
- September 28, 2022 - GMA Legazpi started its digital test broadcast on UHF Channel 41 covering Legazpi City and the towns of Camalig, Daraga, Manito and Santo Domingo in Albay as well as parts of Camarines Sur.
- August 31, 2024 - Due to the end of Balitang Bicolandia, the station became a repeater of DZBB-TV afterwards.

== GMA TV-12 Legazpi programs ==
- Word of God Network
- Peñafrancia Festival
- Balitang Bicolandia

== Digital television ==
=== Digital channels ===
DWLA-TV's digital signal operates on UHF channel 41 (635.143 MHz) and broadcasts on the following subchannels:

Channel	Video	Aspect	Short name	Programming	Note
12.01	480i	16:9	GMA	GMA Legazpi (relay stations of DZBB-TV)	Commercial broadcast (10 kW)
12.02	480i	16:9	GTV	GTV	Commercial broadcast (10 kW)
12.03	480i	16:9	HEART OF ASIA	Heart of Asia	Commercial broadcast (10 kW)
12.06	480i	16:9	I HEART MOVIES	I Heart Movies	Commercial broadcast (10 kW)
12.21	240p	16:9	GMA1SEG	GMA Legzapi Relay	1seg broadcast

== Area of coverage ==
- Portions of:
  - Albay (including Legazpi City)
  - Masbate
  - Sorsogon

== See also ==
- DWCW-FM
- List of GMA Network stations
