= Vanguard Radio Network =

Philippine radio network

- Type: Private
- Industry: Broadcast
- Founded: 1961
- Founder: Manuel Galvez Jr.
- Headquarters: Mandaluyong, Philippines
- Key people: Noel C. Galvez President; Joy Galvez-Dominado Chairperson
- Website: bigsound.com

Vanguard Radio Network (VRN) is a Philippine radio network. Its corporate office is located at Rm. 614, Cityland Shaw Tower, St. Francis St. cor. Shaw Blvd., Ortigas Center, Mandaluyong, and its main headquarters is located at Pan-Philippine Highway, Brgy. Sangitan East, Cabanatuan. VRN operates a number of stations across regional places in Luzon under the Big Sound FM and Big Radio brands.

== VRN stations ==
=== AM stations ===
Callsign	Frequency	Location	Owned since
DZXO	1188 kHz	Cabanatuan	1969
DWMG	1395 kHz	Solano	1969

=== FM stations ===
Branding	Callsign	Frequency	Location	Owned since
Big Sound FM Cabanatuan	DWWG	101.5 MHz	Cabanatuan	1981
Big Sound FM Baguio	DWBG	95.9 MHz	Baguio	1994
Big Sound FM La Union	DWAA	105.5 MHz	San Fernando, La Union	1983
Big Sound FM Tuguegarao	DWXY	100.5 MHz	Tuguegarao	1988
Big Sound FM Cauayan	DWWC	95.3 MHz	Cauayan	1983
Big Sound FM Solano	DWDC	101.3 MHz	Solano	1988
Big Radio Tagbilaran	DYVA	88.7 MHz	Tagbilaran	2015
Big Radio Bongabong	—N/a	107.7 MHz	Bongabong	2022

=== Former stations ===
Callsign	Frequency	Location	Years owned	Current status
DZYG	1330 kHz	Cabanatuan	1961–1972	Closed during Martial Law.
DWNG	97.5 MHz	Lucena	1997–2014	Acquired by Southern Tagalog Sweet Life. Currently broadcasting as Gospel Radio.
DZLC	98.5 MHz	Lipa	2019–2022	Currently broadcasting as Cool FM.

== Trademark dispute ==
In July 2011, VRN filed a legal trademark infringement case at the Intellectual Property Office against Manuelito F. Luzon, owner of ZimZam Management which operates and manages Metro Manila station DWKY (which used the "Big Radio" brand). Luzon was accused of using the said brand without any permission from VRN, citing that VRN already owned the said brand alongside the "Big Sound FM" brand. The case was upheld in 2017, and Luzon violated Section 147 of the Intellectual Property Code of the Philippines.
