= DYKD-TV =

Television station in Masbate, Philippines

GMA TV-7 Masbate (DYRD-TV)
Relay of DZBB-TV
- Philippines
- Channels: Analog: 7 (VHF)
- Branding: GMA TV-7 Masbate

Programming
- Affiliations: GMA Network

Ownership
- Owner: GMA Network Inc.
- Sister stations: DWHL-TV (GTV)

History
- First air date: 2001; 25 years ago (original launch); 2009; 17 years ago (as an originating station); February 1, 2021; 5 years ago(as a relaunch and originating station); August 30, 2024; 2 years ago (as a relay station of DZBB-TV)
- Last air date: April 24, 2015; 11 years ago (due to network-wide strategic streamlining and retrenchments, downgrading Channel 7 to a satellite relay station); August 30, 2024; 2 years ago (due to cost-cutting measures was downgraded into a relay (satellite-selling station))
- Former call signs: DYKD-TV

Technical information
- Licensing authority: NTC
- Power: 1,000 watts

Links
- Website: GMANetwork.com

DYRD-TV (channel 7) is a television station in Masbate City, Philippines, airing programming from the GMA network. Owned and operated by the network's namesake corporate parent, the station maintains transmitter facilities at Brgy. Pinamurbuhan, Mobo, Masbate.

Although identifying as a separate station in its own right, DYRD-TV was considered a straight simulcast of DWAI-TV (channel 7) in Naga City until it was a repeater of DZBB-TV by August 31, 2024.

== GMA TV-7 Masbate former programs ==
- Balitang Bicolandia

== See also ==
- List of GMA Network stations
