= Philippine Senate Committee on Public Information and Mass Media =

Standing committee of the Senate of the Philippines

Committee on Public Information and Mass Media
- Senate of the Philippines; 20th Congress

History
- New session started: July 28, 2025

Leadership
- Chair: Robin Padilla (PDP) since July 29, 2025

Structure
- Seats: 13 members
- Political groups: Majority (8): NPC (3); Nacionalista (2); Akbayan (1); Lakas (1); Independent (1); Minority (5): PDP (2); PMP (1); Independent (2)

The Philippine Senate Committee on Public Information and Mass Media is a standing committee of the Senate of the Philippines.

== Jurisdiction ==
According to the Rules of the Senate, the committee handles all matters relating to:

- Public information, mass communication and broadcast services
- Implementation of the provisions of the Constitution regarding ownership and management of mass media and the advertising industry
- Development and promotion of information technology
- Artistic standards and quality of the motion picture and television industry
- The Movie and Television Review and Classification Board
- The Film Development Council of the Philippines
- The Presidential Communications Office

== Members, 20th Congress ==
Based on the Rules of the Senate, the Senate Committee on Public Information and Mass Media has 13 members.

Position	Member	Party
Chairperson	Robin Padilla	PDP
Vice Chairperson	Jinggoy Estrada	PMP
Deputy Majority Leaders	JV Ejercito	NPC
Deputy Majority Leaders	Risa Hontiveros	Akbayan
Members for the Majority	Lito Lapid	NPC
Members for the Majority	Loren Legarda	NPC
Members for the Majority	Erwin Tulfo	Lakas
Members for the Majority	Raffy Tulfo	Independent
Members for the Majority	Camille Villar	Nacionalista
Members for the Majority	Mark Villar	Nacionalista
Deputy Minority Leaders	Rodante Marcoleta	Independent
Deputy Minority Leaders	Joel Villanueva	Independent
Member for the Minority	Bong Go	PDP

Ex officio members:

- Senate President pro tempore Panfilo Lacson
- Majority Floor Leader Juan Miguel Zubiri
- Minority Floor Leader Alan Peter Cayetano

Committee secretary: Bernadine B. Mahinay

== Historical membership rosters ==
=== 19th Congress ===
Position	Member	Party
Chairperson	Robin Padilla	PDP–Laban
Vice Chairperson	Bong Revilla	Lakas
Members for the Majority	JV Ejercito	NPC
Members for the Majority	Mark Villar	Nacionalista
Members for the Majority	Win Gatchalian	NPC
Members for the Majority	Bong Go	PDP–Laban
Members for the Majority	Lito Lapid	NPC
Members for the Majority	Loren Legarda	NPC
Members for the Majority	Imee Marcos	Nacionalista
Members for the Majority	Grace Poe	Independent
Members for the Majority	Raffy Tulfo	Independent
Members for the Majority	Cynthia Villar	Nacionalista
Member for the Minority	Risa Hontiveros	Akbayan

Committee secretary: Bernadine B. Mahinay

== See also ==
- List of Philippine Senate committees
