= DWGC-TV =

Television station in Daet, Philippines

GMA TV-8 Daet (DWGC-TV)
Repeater of DZBB-TV
- Philippines
- Channels: Analog: 8 (VHF)
- Branding: GMA TV-8 Daet

Programming
- Affiliations: GMA Network (O&O)

Ownership
- Owner: GMA Network Inc.

History
- First air date: March 2014; 12 years ago (as a launch); 2009; 17 years ago (as a originating station); February 1, 2021; 5 years ago (as a relaunch and originating station); August 30, 2024; 23 months ago (as a relay station of DZBB-TV)
- Last air date: April 24, 2015; 11 years ago (due to network-wide strategic streamlining and retrenchments, downgrading Channel 7 to a satellite relay station); August 30, 2024; 23 months ago (due to cost-cutting measures was downgraded into a relay (satellite-selling station))

Technical information
- Licensing authority: NTC
- Power: 2 kW
- ERP: 20.5 kW
- Transmitter coordinates: 14°5′48.6″N 122°57′19.4″E

Links
- Website: GMANetwork.com

DWGC-TV (channel 8) is a television station in the Philippines, airing programming from the GMA Network. Owned and operated by the network's namesake corporate parent, the station maintains transmitter facilities at Purok 2, Barangay Mangcruz, Daet, Camarines Norte. The station

Although identifying as a separate station in its own right, DWGC-TV is considered a straight simulcast of DWAI-TV (channel 7) in Naga City; from there, it carries Balitang Bicolandia until August 30, 2024, when it aired its final episode. It became a repeater of DZBB-TV after this.

== GMA TV-8 Daet former programs ==
- 24 Oras Bikol
- Balitang Bicolandia

== Area of Coverage ==
- Portion of Camarines Norte

== See also ==
- DWAI-TV
- List of GMA Network Stations
