= GMA Network =

Philippine television network

- Logo used since October 27, 2002

- The GMA Network Center in Diliman, Quezon City, the company's headquarters.
- Type: Broadcasting network
- Country: Philippines
- Broadcast area: Nationwide
- Affiliates: See list
- Headquarters: GMA Network Center, EDSA corner Timog Avenue, Diliman, Quezon City, Metro Manila, Philippines

Programming
- Languages: Filipino (main); English (secondary)
- Picture format: 720p/1080p HDTV (downscaled to 16:9 480i for the SDTV feed)

Ownership
- Owner: GMA Network Inc.
- Key people: Atty. Felipe L. Gozon (Chairman and Adviser); Gilberto Duavit Jr. (President and CEO); Felipe S. Yalong (EVP and CFO); Atty. Annette Gozon-Valdes (Senior Vice President)
- Sister channels: GMA Life TV; GMA News TV International; GMA Pinoy TV; GTV; Heart of Asia Channel; I Heart Movies

History
- Founded: March 1, 1950; 76 years ago
- Launched: March 1, 1950; 76 years ago (radio); October 29, 1961; 65 years ago (television)
- Founder: Robert "Uncle Bob" Stewart
- Former names: Republic Broadcasting System (1961–74); GMA Radio-Television Arts (1974–92); GMA Rainbow Satellite Network (1992–95)

Links
- Webcast: Live streaming (Philippine users only)
- Website: www.gmanetwork.com

Availability

Terrestrial
- Analog VHF/UHF: Listings may vary
- Digital UHF: Listings may vary
- GMA Affordabox: Channel 1
- Sky Cable: Channel 12 (Mega Manila); Channel 5 (regional)
- Converge Vision / SkyTV (Metro Manila): Channel 7
- Sky Direct (Nationwide): Channel 5
- Cignal TV (Nationwide): Channel 7
- SatLite (Nationwide): Channel 7
- G Sat (Nationwide): Channel 4
- Cablelink (Metro Manila, Cavite, Laguna, Bulacan, Tarlac): Channel 12

Streaming media
- GMA Play: Philippines only

GMA Network (a backronym of its legal name, Global Media Arts and commonly known as GMA) is a Philippine commercial broadcast network, serving as the flagship property of publicly traded GMA Network Inc. The network is headquartered in the GMA Network Center with its transmitter facilities, the Tower of Power, located at Tandang Sora Avenue, Barangay Culiat, in Quezon City, along with regional offices in the cities of Dagupan, Iloilo, Bacolod, Cebu, Cagayan de Oro, Davao, and General Santos. Commonly referred to as and its trade name is the Kapuso Network ("heart" in Filipino) in reference to the outline of the company's logo since its introduction on October 27, 2002.

The original meaning of the GMA acronym was Greater Manila Area, referring to the initial coverage area of the station. As the network expanded, it changed into Global Media Arts. GMA Network is one of the largest television and media networks in the Philippines. GMA first broadcast on television on October 29, 1961, as Republic Broadcasting System (RBS) on DZBB-TV Channel 7, 11 years after the success of its radio station DZBB.

Today, the flagship television station of GMA, which carries channel 7 on analog (VHF), and Channel 15 on digital (ISDB-T International) across Mega Manila. As such, the network is informally referred to as "Channel 7" or "siete" (Spanish for "seven"), even though the network is seen in other channel numbers elsewhere in the country. In addition, the network operates several stations across the Philippines through GMA Regional TV. Its programming is also seen via streaming app GMA Play and through global pay-television channels GMA Pinoy TV, GMA Life TV, and GMA News TV.

== History ==
=== 1950s and 1960s ===
The origin of GMA Network can be traced back to Loreto F. de Hemedes Inc. through DZBB, which started airing its radio broadcast on March 1, 1950, and officially launched as a local radio station in Manila on June 14, 1950, owned by Robert La Rue "Uncle Bob" Stewart, an American war correspondent. Venturing into television in the 1960s, Stewart started RBS TV Channel 7 (under the call letters DZBB-TV) on October 29, 1961, becoming the Philippines' third terrestrial television station. Originally, RBS's programming was composed of foreign programs from the United States and it later produced local programs to cater to Filipino audiences. It produced shows like Uncle Bob's Lucky Seven Club, a child-oriented show aired every Saturday; Dance Time with Chito; and various news programs like News at Seven. In February 1962 RBS first launched its first local television station in Cebu, DYSS (GMA Channel 7).

=== 1970s ===
On September 21, 1972, then President Ferdinand Marcos declared martial law by the virtue of Proclamation 1081. Marcos, ruling by decree, curtailed press freedom and other civil liberties; closed down the Congress and media establishments including RBS. In December 1972, RBS was given the green light by the government to return on the air, however with limited three-month permits. Programming during that time was supplied mostly via a blocktime agreement with Philippine Production Center Inc. (PPCI), a company led by former ABS-CBN executive Romeo Jalosjos. But due to limited licenses, difficulty in financial obligations, and disallowing foreign citizens and entities from owning and operating media companies in the Philippines, Stewart and the American Broadcasting Company, which owned 25% of the company, were forced to cede majority control to a triumvirate composed of Gilberto Duavit Sr., a Malacañang official; Menardo Jimenez, an accountant; and Felipe Gozon, an attorney of the Stewarts in 1974. The station changed its name to GMA Radio-Television Arts (GMA stood for Greater Manila Area, the station's initial coverage area) and also renamed its corporate name as Republic Broadcasting System, Inc. on May 28, 1974, until 1996. Stewart's wife Loreto was the president when the takeover ensued. The relaunched GMA, aside from sporting a light blue square logo with the network name in white, also (until 1980) had a circle 7 logo in use, in its final years the blue circle 7 logo used was similar to those used by the ABC in some United States cities.

After that, Rod Reyes, then-general manager of RBS, recruited old-timers from ABS-CBN, including those from its news and entertainment divisions. After the Duavit-Jimenez-Gozon takeover, the station began to broadcast in color with an ₱8 million credit line thru buying telecine machines and acquired foreign programs. Ratings were up from #5 to #3 that time.

=== 1980s ===
During martial law under the Marcos regime, GMA managed to broadcast the funeral of senator Ninoy Aquino, a public opposition leader who was assassinated in August 1983, the only local network to do so. In 1984, Imee Marcos, daughter of Ferdinand Marcos, attempted to take over GMA. However, the takeover was prevented by the network executives. Stewart left the country for good as a result. The network played an instrumental role during the years preceding the People Power Revolution. They were the first to air an interview with Corazon Aquino in 1984, as well as when she announced her intention to run for presidency once she receives one million signatures. During the People Power Revolution, the network was also the first to report that Fidel Ramos and Juan Ponce Enrile broke away from the Marcos administration. GMA's rival ABS-CBN reopened in September 1986 and convinced several of the network's talents and executives, including Freddie M. Garcia to transfer along with key people from the network's Marketing and Engineering departments.

The People Power Revolution enabled previously shut television stations to air again. However, the political instability during Aquino's term added burden to the network, mostly in 1987 when it was stormed by rebel soldiers for two days as a part of an attempted coup against the Aquino administration. In 1987, the network broadcast its programs for the first time in full stereo, the first VHF television network to do so in the country. Additionally, Broadway Centrum opened, and in 1988, they also inaugurated the 777 feet (237 m), 120 kW Tower of Power in Quezon City, one of the tallest man-made structures in the country.

=== 1990s ===
In 1992, the Philippine Congress passed a law granting the network to operate for another 25 years. The network then targeted international reach in the 1990s. Through its relay stations, GMA programs were seen across the country as well as parts of Asia. GMA programming started airing in 60 American cities and parts of South America through the International Channel Network.

GMA was selected to be the official broadcaster for the 1995 World Youth Day, when Pope John Paul II visited the country again. During the same year, popular TV shows Eat Bulaga! and Okay Ka, Fairy Ko! began broadcasting on GMA after TAPE Inc., the programs' production company, refused an ABS-CBN proposal to buy the airing rights of the two shows. Around the same time, the network launched a UHF channel subsidiary, Citynet 27, several new shows (including weekly late-night show Bubble Gang), as well as the late night news program Saksi. The network also adapted The 700 Club series as The 700 Club Asia.

In 1994, GMA founded its own film production company, Cinemax Studios (renamed to GMA Films in 1998, then GMA Pictures in 2019) for the film Run Barbi Run, marking the second film production studio owned by another network after Star Cinema (founded in 1993 by ABS-CBN). In 1998, the company produced the biopic film José Rizal, then the most expensive Filipino film produced, and had a successful run, garnering many accolades and nominations from award-giving bodies.

GMA formally changed its corporate name in 1996 to GMA Network Inc., with the acronym 'GMA' now standing for Global Media Arts. In 1999, GMA aired the Filipino language television news program GMA Network News, originally an English language newscast, then a rarity in Philippine television.

GMA was the first Philippine broadcaster to receive a Peabody Award for Investigative Reporting in 1999. Later, Citynet 27 became EMC, the first local music video-oriented TV channel, which became part of the short-lived Channel V franchise called Channel V Philippines. GMA also served as the official Philippine partner to broadcast the international millennium television special 2000 Today, along with its millennium party hosted by the network, held at the Ayala Center in Makati City. The network then began airing 24-hour broadcasting until the National Telecommunications Commission (NTC) released and implemented a new set of rules and regulations with its affiliated free-to-air TV networks in 2001.

=== 2000s ===
In October 2000, Menardo Jimenez officially announced his retirement as president and chief executive officer (CEO) of the network beginning December 6 of the same year, with Felipe Gozon assumed his office in concurrent capacity as the board chairman of the network, while Duavit Sr.'s son Gilberto "Jimmy" Duavit Jr. was appointed by GMA Network's Board of Directors as Executive Vice President (EVP) and Chief Operating Officer (COO) of the company.

On May 1, 2001, GMA news reporters Michael Fajatin, Jiggy Manicad and Arnold Clavio were injured during the EDSA III riots initiated by the Pro-Estrada groups, who were seen as hostile to news media.

GMA officially revealed its present logo and image during an episode of Sunday noontime show SOP on October 27, 2002. The following year, Saksi won a New York Television Festival Gold Medal for its newscast, the first Filipino news program to do so. This win, along with the Peabody Award in 1999, earned the network a commendation from the House of Representatives later that year. On September 1, 2003, GMA withdrew its membership from the Kapisanan ng mga Brodkaster ng Pilipinas (KBP), after various issues and incidents involving its news talents and the cable firm Sky Cable's alleged distortion of GMA's signal on its system, among other factors. The network premiered several programs in 2004: 24 Oras (a newscast), Reporter's Notebook (a documentary), Pinoy Pop Superstar (a singing search), Mulawin (a fantasy series) and Kapuso Mo, Jessica Soho (a magazine show).

In 2005, subsidiary Citynet signed an agreement with ZOE Broadcasting Network. From 2005 to 2019, ZOE's flagship station DZOE-TV Channel 11, went on air as Quality TeleVision (QTV) (later reformatted as the GMA News TV, and now known as GTV on DWDB-TV Channel 27). The network planned to offer its initial public offering; however, the plan was delayed due to political instability during Arroyo's administration, among other factors. In 2007, the network announced its initial public offering after several setbacks.

In 2006, Debate with Mare at Pare, a late-night public affairs program, won the bronze medal at the New York Television Festival. The network was also praised for its coverage of the Wowowee stampede by local publications. An exclusive interview by Mike Enriquez with President Gloria Macapagal Arroyo after the lifting of the state of national emergency was allowed by GMA to be aired by other networks without prior consent, and was also similarly praised, including by the president herself. In April of the same year, GMA founder Robert Stewart died while in the United States. The network supported and documented the successful attempt of mountain climber Romi Garduce to reach the summit of Mount Everest, only the third Filipino to do so.

=== 2010s ===
GMA Network Center in 2015

On February 1, 2012, GMA Network signed a three-year deal with now-defunct Fox International Channels which allows locally produced GMA's shows and feature films to air on FOX cable channels. The said deal covers a minimum of 350 hours' worth of programs and 25 feature films. Among the programs delivered to FOX for airing in its Philippine feed including Encantadia, Darna, Dyesebel, Super Twins, Stairway to Heaven, Kaya Kong Abutin ang Langit, Trudis Liit and Babangon Ako't Dudurugin Kita, and news and public affairs shows like Wish Ko Lang, Pinoy Meets World and Pinoy Abroad. While the films covered by the deal are: My Best Friend's Girlfriend, When I Met U, Yaya and Angelina: The Spoiled Brat Movie, Temptation Island and José Rizal.

On February 22, 2012, GMA Films' President Annette Gozon-Abrogar and director Yam Laranas announced that the thriller movie The Road was commercially released and shown in over 50 theaters across North America and Canada on May 11, 2012, a first for a local Filipino motion picture.

On February 28, 2012, the network announced the retirement of senior vice president for the Entertainment Group, Wilma Galvante. The announcement came about after Galvante officially retired from the network, ending her 19 years of service as entertainment head. GMA Network appointed Lilybeth G. Rasonable as Officer-in-charge of the Entertainment Group. Rasonable has been with the network since 1998 and has served as program manager, assistant vice president, and vice president for drama for the Entertainment Group. Her latest position prior to the appointment has seen her supervising the group's afternoon and primetime teledramas.

In April 2012, GMA Network's president and COO Gilberto Duavit Jr. announced that the network hit consolidated revenues at 13.083 billion pesos in 2011. That is despite the absence of 2.054 billion pesos' worth of revenues from political ads generated in 2010 and the global impact of financial crisis in Europe and slow economic recovery in the U.S. in 2011.

On October 4, 2012, the network announced the termination of negotiations with MediaQuest Holdings, Inc. (an affiliate of Philippine Long Distance Telephone Company, through its Beneficial Trust Fund group) owned by businessman and TV5 chairman Manny V. Pangilinan. Since the beginning of the year, Mr. Pangilinan had been vocal with his interest to acquire GMA Network, saying that he "talked to them, ... since 2002, and then maybe five years ago. Following the return of the negotiations of GMA Network to the PLDT Group, Manny V. Pangilinan confirming on March 4, 2014, that the offer to buy 34% stake at GMA Network was expired in February of the same year.

On September 29, 2013, a fire hit the basement of the GMA Network building in Quezon City, affecting the operations of the television network. The fire was put out the next day.

On May 5, 2014, GMA Network chairman and CEO, attorney Felipe L. Gozon confirmed the network entered negotiations with San Miguel Corporation president and COO Ramon S. Ang. A month after, on June 24, 2014, GMA Network's major stockholders announced it will sell 30% of their equity shares of the network to Ang in his personal capacity. San Miguel Corporation is not involved in Ang's acquisition of the shares. In June 2015, the network, in a disclosure to the securities commission, said that talks with Ramon Ang has bogged down. In that same year, GMA won another Peabody Award for its coverage of Typhoon Haiyan (locally known as Super Typhoon Yolanda).

In April 2015, GMA Network implemented a series of budget cuts towards its regional television stations by terminating at least 200 regional employees, downgrading its originating TV stations in Bacolod, Naga, Cagayan de Oro, and Ilocos Sur to 'satellite-selling' or relay TV stations, and cancelling morning shows in Cebu, Davao, Iloilo and Dagupan, reportedly in order for them to "streamline their operations for increased ratings and revenue". In November of the same year, the network also downgraded its originating station in Iloilo City into 'relay-selling' or satellite TV station and cancelling Ratsada 24 Oras following the retrenchment of 20 employees from the news department as part of the strategic streamlining undertaken by GMA Network.

On April 21, 2017, Philippine President Rodrigo Duterte signed Republic Act No. 10925 which renewed GMA Network's license for another 25 years. The law granted GMA Network a franchise to construct, install, operate, and maintain, for commercial purposes, radio broadcasting stations and television stations, including digital television system, with the corresponding facilities such as relay stations, throughout the Philippines.

On August 27, 2018, GMA regional stations in Iloilo and Bacolod were upgraded again to originating station as GMA Western Visayas following the launch of the new regional news program One Western Visayas.

On December 14, 2018, GMA Network's founding chairman Atty. Gilberto M. Duavit Sr. died at the age of 84. He was GMA Network's chairman from 1974 to 1976 and sat as one of the network's board of directors in 1977. He rejoined the network's board of directors in 2016 until the time of his death.

On February 22, 2019, the network has announced that they will be investing ₱1 billion for the second phase of their digitization project.

=== 2020s ===
On March 14, 2020, GMA Network announced the suspension of production of current programs, especially the live shows, due to President Rodrigo Duterte implementing an enhanced community quarantine in Metro Manila and Luzon in line with restrictions due to the COVID-19 pandemic in the Philippines. Thus, the network rebroadcast several of their previous drama series. On August 24, 2020, GMA Network resumed production of current programs.

On February 1, 2021, GMA Network relaunched its Bicol station in Naga to broadcast its newscast Balitang Bicolandia. Later, on October 14, 2021, GMA launched its regional office in Zamboanga City, in February 2022 in Batangas, on March 16, 2022, in General Santos, near its transmitter station, in September 2022, relaunching its station in San Vicente, Ilocos Sur, and on March 17, 2023, in Laoag, Ilocos Norte.

On April 5, 2022, GMA Network announced a collaboration with ABS-CBN that began with airing of Star Cinema films on GMA's local channels. GMA Network then collaborated with Dreamscape and Viu on November 11 of that year to co-produce a drama series Unbreak My Heart.

On February 27, 2023, GMA Network, along with GTV, its free-to-air digital subchannels (Heart of Asia Channel, Hallypop, I Heart Movies and Pinoy Hits) and three pay TV international channels (GMA Pinoy TV and GMA Life TV and GMA News TV International), have switched its airing of aspect ratio format quality on the channel feed and its programming to anamorphic widescreen ratio format (16:9) as announced on February 24 that being converted its mitigation of reception through analog (until end of the year) and digital signal reception through free-to-air television and other cable and satellite providers after more than 61 years on the usage of broadcast video picture resolution that migrated from standard-definition format (4:3).

On December 9, 2023, attorney Felipe L. Gozon, during his 84th birthday celebration at Edsa Shangri-La, Manila, announced his retirement from his position as chief executive officer (CEO) of GMA Network Inc., having replaced by the company's president and Chief Operating Officer (COO), Gilberto Duavit Jr., starting January 1, 2024. Gozon remained as board chairman of the network and becomes an Adviser of the company.

In 2024, GMA closed regional offices in Ilocos, Batangas City, Naga, and Zamboanga due to cost-cutting measures driven by inflation.

In January 2025, Super Radyo DZBB anchor, former Radio Mindanao Network's DZXL 558, Brigada Mass Media Corporation's 104.7 Brigada News FM National, Philippine Broadcasting Service's Radyo Pilipinas 738 and the Vanguard Radio Network voiceover announcer and voiceover Weng dela Peña was introduced as the new voiceover of GMA Network replacing Al Torres after 30 years in line. At the same time, a PCC study revealed that GMA's viewing share was of 93%, more than double that of early 2020 (45.5%), before ABS-CBN's shutdown, raising concerns of the network monopolizing Philippine television.

== Digital terrestrial television ==
In February 2013, GMA Network admitted that it was conducting field tests of Integrated Services Digital Broadcasting-Terrestrial (ISDB-T International), the Latin American standard in digital television on UHF Channel 27 (551.143 MHz), but remained unconvinced of ISDB-T, saying that the European standard, second-generation Digital Video Broadcasting-Terrestrial (DVB-T2), is superior to ISDB-T. However, in October 2013, the NTC issued a draft memorandum circular adopting the Japanese or Latin American (ISDB-T International) standard as the sole standard in the delivery of digital terrestrial TV (DTT) services in the Philippines. In May 2015, GMA Network announced that it will be spending at least ₱2-3 billion for the rollout of its digital TV service and said the company plans to produce dongles, instead of set-top boxes for the rollout. In May 2015, GMA topped the digital TV test commissioned by mobile phone brand Starmobile and conducted by American market research firm International Data Corporation (IDC) with GMA's presence in 10 out of 14 locations in Metro Manila.

Beginning September 2013, some of the programs of the network have been produced in high-definition format in preparation for the ongoing digital shift in the country while keeping digital on-screen graphics in 4:3 safe zone for their TV broadcast since the network is still broadcasting in 480i. The videos uploaded on their YouTube channel and third-party OTT services on the other hand are presented in 720p and 1080p format. GMA Playground is an extension of the digital terrestrial television format of the GMA Network.

In December 2016, it was announced that the network will spend an initial amount of ₱416 million for the commencement of the Digital Terrestrial Television transition project of GMA, which included the purchase of three high-powered transmitters capable for providing wider and clearer signal to digital television boxes, antennae and other connectivity requirements, and a fully mirrored head-end system, which is a master facility for grouping and digitally encoding programs. According to GMA Network Chairman and CEO, Felipe Gozon, the network will conclude the test phase, and it is expected to begin the rollout of the DTTV project starting in Metro Manila.

In preparation for the shift to digital, GMA New Media was working on a DTV set-top box (originally reported to be a DTV dongle) in order to compete with ABS-CBN's TV Plus set-top box. A prototype was shown at the IMMAP DigiCon congress in 2016, and is shown to be running a version of Android, double-acting as a streaming device capable of running apps and games. In June 2020, images of a DTV set-top box known as the GMA Affordabox. Which includes a multimedia player, a personal video recorder, and support for the Philippines' emergency broadcast warning system with an auto-on alert feature. On December 12, 2020, a DTV mobile dongle which designed for USB OTG-capable Android smartphones known as GMA Now was released and it also has a video on demand feature to access GMA's exclusive online contents, a web chat (Groupee Chat), and interactive games, which requires internet connection for additional features.

On February 22, 2019, GMA Network announced that they will be investing ₱1 billion for the second phase of its digitization project. On May 15, 2019, GMA Network began to transmit its digital test broadcast on UHF Channel 15 (479.143 MHz) as its permanent frequency assigned by National Telecommunications Commission.

== Ownership structure ==
GMA Network is jointly owned by its three major shareholders; the Gozon, Duavit and Jimenez families. Its corporate shareholding is owned by Group Management & Development Inc. (27.05%), FLG Management & Development Corp. (23.33%), M.A. Jimenez Enterprises (15.55%), GMA Holdings Inc. (14.81%), and Television International Corp. (11.45%).

Shareholder GMA Holdings, Inc. is jointly owned by Felipe L. Gozon, Gilberto Duavit Jr., and Joel Marcelo Jimenez.

== Branding ==
=== Network identity ===
On October 29, 1961, Loreto F. de Hemedes Inc. launches its first television station in the Philippines, known back then as RBS TV Channel 7. GMA Network began branding its identity by eliminating call signs to its network identification.

- RBS TV Channel 7 (1961–1974) – From the success of its amplitude modulation band radio DZBB, Robert La Rue "Uncle Bob" Stewart launches its first television and the Philippines' fifth terrestrial channel, RBS TV Channel 7.
- GMA Radio-Television Arts (1974–1992) – To ascertain its presence in its coverage area, the Greater Manila Area, RBS changed its name to GMA Radio-Television Arts after the takeover by the new management.
- GMA Rainbow Satellite Network (Rainbow Network, 1992–1995) – When the network launched its satellite to widen its coverage area, GMA again rebranded its network identity on April 30, 1992.
- GMA Network (Rainbow Network, 1995–2002) – In preparation for the 45th year of responsible broadcasting, GMA Rainbow Satellite was simplified to GMA Network.
- GMA Network (Kapuso Network, 2002–present) – On October 27, 2002, GMA Network unveiled its new identity and catchphrase. In an effort to localize and transform its image into a more intrinsic Filipino network, GMA Network engaged in a rebranding course.

=== Logos ===
GMA Network has used a number of logos throughout its history especially when Gozon, Jimenez, and Duavit acquired the station in 1975. From the late 1970s to the early 1990s, the network used the Circle 7 logo for its Metro Manila and Cebu stations, which is also expended by several networks around the world (predominately the O&O and affiliate stations of ABC in the United States). In the 1980s, to refine its presence in the Philippine broadcast industry, GMA Network used the slogan "Where You Belong", and lasted for two decades before invigorating to another catchphrase. In 1992, GMA Network redefines itself as the Rainbow Network, succeeding the ensigns of the rainbow. Throughout the 1990s and early 2000s, the network used the rainbow symbol before having it replaced by its current logo in 2002 and as the Kapuso Network. After a huge marketing campaign, and improved television ratings, the new insignia (the rainbow-colored stylized heart-shape logo known as "Kapuso") is now one of the most recognizable in the Philippines.

=== Slogans ===
"Kapuso ng Bawat Pilipino" ("One in Heart with Every Filipino") is the secondary characteristic catchphrase of GMA Network. The slogan was initially used in conjunction with the rebranding of GMA Network as the Kapuso Network on October 27, 2002. (Currently, it is used in its Regional TV stations). But another slogan of the network "Kapuso, Anumang Kulay ng Buhay" ("One in Heart, in Every Colors of Life") is still used in other purposes and this is the official theme song title for the network. GMA Network's news and public affairs department meanwhile uses the slogan "Serbisyong Totoo" ("True Service") It is one of the longest running slogans used for news broadcast promotion. GMA Network found itself on the other end of a battle concerning the slogan, when ABS-CBN News Channel uses similar catchphrase, and immediately discontinued in order to avoid legal predicament from GMA Network. In 2006, its news department also used an accompanying slogan, "Just News", for its promotional campaign together with its news media partners, INQ7.Net. In 2018, the network introduced a new corporate slogan, "Buong Puso para sa Kapuso" ("Wholehearted for the One in Heart") which presented GMA's effort to bring programs, relevant shows, multi-awarded newscasts and documentaries and other services through TV, radio and online format from its birth to the present time, from the Philippines and abroad. In 2020, a variation of the slogan "Buong Puso para sa Pilipino" ("Wholehearted for the Filipino") was unveiled on its 70th anniversary (currently used as a secondary slogan for its original 2018 slogan). It is currently shown on programming promo plugs of the network on TV and its Social Media channels, and "Buong Puso para sa Pinoy Abroad" ("Wholehearted for the Filipino Abroad") for celebrating GMA Pinoy TV's 15th anniversary. In 2024, ahead to its 75th anniversary, GMA Network unveil a new slogan, "Isa sa Puso ng Pilipino" ("One with the Heart of Filipino") along with a new station ID.

== Programming ==
Programming on GMA Network television consists of news and public affairs, local dramas and soap operas, cartoons and anime series, variety and musical shows, talk shows and reality shows, children's shows and film presentations, and sports. Most of the programs are broadcast live or recorded in GMA Network Centers and Studios located in Metropolitan Manila. Currently, GMA network has 20.5 hours of programming per day. It provides 34.5 hours of prime-time programming per week to it own or is affiliated with: on weekdays, 4:00–10:00 p.m. on Mondays to Thursdays, 10:00 p.m.–1:00 a.m. on Fridays, 10:00 p.m.–1:00 a.m. on Saturdays, 4:30 p.m.–1:30 a.m. on Sundays. Programming is also provided from 4:00 p.m.–2:40 a.m. on Weekdays in the form of Unang Hirit; the two-and-half-hour Monday to Saturday for a simulcast of noontime variety show It's Showtime produced by ABS-CBN Studios, early-afternoon drama (Afternoon Prime block), early and late-evening news programs (24 Oras and Saksi respectively); primetime programming through its Prime (formerly Telebabad) block; late-night current affairs show produced by its news and public affairs department.

=== Competition ===
The programming competition started in 2004 when production of numerous GMA Network shows went up against its rival network, ABS-CBN. The reality show Extra Challenge began to lead the ratings with launch of "telefantasya" Mulawin. On September 23, 2004, GMA Network gained leadership in Mega Manila against its closest competitor. In 2005, GMA Network began producing Mars Ravelo's Darna, a classic Filipino comic book character, which became a hit with an overnight rating of 47.7 percent, the highest rating for a pilot episode and the first "telefantasya" to reach 52.1 percent ratings; followed by Encantadia at 47.2 percent and other prime-time "telefantasyas", Mulawin (2004) and Sugo (2005) contributed to GMA Network lead in Mega Manila. In 2006, GMA Network maintained its prime time supremacy by reformatting its reality-based program Extra Challenge and another "telefantasya" Encantadia (which was succeeded by Etheria and Encantadia: Pag-ibig Hanggang Wakas), and the localized subtitled versions of Korean television series Stairway to Heaven, Full House, Jewel in the Palace and My Lovely Sam Soon.

In 2007, GMA Network started producing the local version of a Mexican television series MariMar. For its pilot episode, it got 52.6 percent overnight rating, making it the only soap opera to achieve the highest ratings in GMA Network's history. In a 2006 survey conducted by Pulse Asia, seven out of 10 Metro Manila-based viewers find GMA Network a more credible network than its competitor. GMA Network managed to lead in Mega Manila and Southern Luzon demographic, which has the highest concentration of television ownership and 79 percent of advertisement placement.

The National Urban Television Audience Measurement was officially launched on October 16, 2006, to determine the television ratings and the audience share of local TV programs from urban areas in the Philippines. This changes the broadcast industry landscape and the manner in which the advertisers allocate their TV investments to achieve cost efficiency and maximization. In August 2007 audience rating data shows GMA Network maintained its lead in Mega Manila, which resulted to a 23 percent growth in its consolidated net income to ₱1.13 billion in the first half of the year from ₱915 million in the same period last year. GMA Network income grew by 23 percent year-on-year to ₱1.126 billion in the first six months of the year. Mega Manila accounts 49 percent of total TV households. The Mega Manila and Luzon markets combined accounts for 76 percent of the total TV households. It earned ₱2.3 billion in 2007. In 2011, GMA Network maintained the lead in the national television ratings mentioning figures from Nielsen TV Audience Measurement for January 1 to February 13, 2011. It had 33.2 percent audience shared based on overnight data, higher than ABS-CBN's 31.8 percent and TV5's 14.9 percent. It also leads in Urban Luzon, which makes up 77 percent of total television households in the Philippines. GMA Network posted 9.8 point lead with 36.5 points compared with the closest competitor, ABS-CBN's 26.7 points and imposing a 19.6 point lead from TV5's 16.9. GMA Network also sustained to beat ABS-CBN in Mega Manila, which accounts for 58 percent of television household. It got 37.7 percent share over ABS-CBN 25.2 percent and TV5's 17.7 percent, 20 points higher.

== Broadcast stations ==
GMA operates its local television stations across 52 key areas in the Philippines, including its flagship DZBB-TV (GMA-7 Manila) and five other originating stations. It had originating stations in Ilocos Sur, Batangas, Naga and Cagayan de Oro, until they were shut and shifted into relay stations or semi-satellites.

Callsign	Channel	Transmitter Location	Coordinates
DZBB	7 (analog); 15 (digital)	Quezon City (Note: Flagship television station with digital single-frequency network (SFN) relay stations at PBCom Tower in Makati; Zen Towers in Manila; Antipolo, Angeles City, Cabanatuan, Malolos and Jalajala.)	14°40′12″N 121°03′00″E
DWAZ	7 (analog)	Basco, Batanes (Note: Relay station)	20°27′03″N 121°58′17″E
D-5-AS	5 (analog); 24 (digital)	San Nicolas, Ilocos Norte	18°08′34″N 120°35′09″E
DWBC	48 (analog); 15 (digital)	Mt. Caniao, Ilocos Sur	17°36′09″N 120°29′11″E
D-7-ZG	7 (analog)	Peñarrubia, Abra	17°33′18″N 120°40′20″E
DWBB	7 (analog)	Tuguegarao	17°36′35″N 121°43′29″E
DZBB	13 (analog)	Aparri	18°21′15″N 121°38′31″E
DZVG	5 (analog); 29 (digital)	Mt. Amuyao, Mountain Province	17°00′44″N 121°07′47″E
DWLE	7 (analog); 15 (digital)	Santiago, Isabela	16°41′18″N 121°33′02″E
DZEA	10 (analog); 38 (digital)	Mt. Santo Tomas, Benguet (Note: Originating station based in Dagupan, Pangasinan.)	16°20′07″N 120°33′40″E
D-5-ZB	5 (analog)	Baler, Aurora	15°46′06″N 121°33′32″E
DWNS	10 (analog); 38 (digital)	Olongapo	14°51′01″N 120°16′43″E
D-12-ZB	12 (analog); 32 (digital)	Mt. Banoy, Batangas (Note: Relay station with a digital SFN in San Pablo, Laguna.)	13°42′21″N 121°10′21″E
DWJJ	44 (analog)	Jalajala	14°20′13″N 121°19′45″E
D-13-ZR	13 (analog); 15 (digital)	San Jose, Occidental Mindoro	12°21′16″N 121°03′54″E
DYPU	12 (analog); 15 (digital)	Puerto Princesa	9°48′00″N 118°44′04″E
DYAA	6 (analog)	Brooke's Point, Palawan	8°46′38″N 117°50′04″E
DWRF	8 (analog)	Coron, Palawan	12°00′18″N 120°12′17″E
DWTR	7 (analog)	Tablas, Romblon	12°24′25″N 122°04′09″E
DYRD	7 (analog)	Mobo, Masbate	12°20′40″N 123°38′29″E
DWAI	7 (analog); 38 (digital)	Naga, Camarines Sur	13°37′10″N 123°11′51″E
DWLA	12 (analog); 41 (digital)	Legazpi, Albay	13°06′59″N 123°43′38″E
D-13-ZC	13 (analog)	Virac, Catanduanes	13°36′24″N 124°13′52″E
DWGA	2 (analog)	Juban, Sorsogon	12°47′44″N 123°56′18″E
DWGC	8 (analog)	Daet	14°05′49″N 122°57′19″E
DYBB	2 (analog)	Numancia, Aklan	11°43′5″N 122°21′41″E
DYAM	5 (analog); 15 (digital)	Roxas City	11°33′38″N 122°45′44″E
DYXX	6 (analog); 29 (digital)	Jordan, Guimaras (Note: Originating station based in Iloilo City.)	10°38′37″N 122°37′8″E
DWGM	13 (analog); 44 (digital)	Bacolod (Note: Semi-satellite)	10°40′9″N 122°56′56″E
DYGM	30 (analog); 15 (digital)	Murcia, Negros Occidental (Note: Relay station with a digital SFN in Cadiz, Negros Occidental.)	10°36′28″N 123°8′50″E
D-10-YA	10 (analog)	Sipalay	9°44′54″N 122°24′14″E
DYSS	7 (analog); 26 (digital)	Cebu City (Note: Originating station)	10°21′49″N 123°51′13″E
D-5-YB	5 (analog); 22 (digital)	Valencia, Negros Oriental	9°18′23″N 123°13′50″E
D-11-YE	11 (analog)	Tagbilaran	9°37′59″N 123°52′59″E
DYCL	10 (analog); 34 (digital)	Tacloban	11°14′38″N 124°57′59″E
DYIL	12 (analog)	Ormoc	11°0′29″N 124°36′54″E
DYAS	5 (analog)	Calbayog	12°4′1″N 124°34′52″E
DYVB	8 (analog)	Borongan	11°37′9″N 125°25′57″E
DXJC	35 (analog)	Cagayan de Oro	8°27′9″N 124°42′12″E
DXDZ	47 (digital)	Cagayan de Oro	8°27′9″N 124°42′12″E
DXMK	12 (analog); 44 (digital)	Mt. Kitanglad, Bukidnon	8°8′23″N 124°54′59″E
D-4-XT	4 (analog); 15 (digital)	Dipolog	8°35′20″N 123°23′31″E
DXGM	5 (analog)	Ozamiz	8°8′14″N 123°49′18″E
DXEJ	3 (analog)	Pagadian	7°50′25″N 123°22′55″E
DXRV	11 (analog); 33 (digital)	Iligan	8°13′48″N 124°15′47″E
DXBM	26 (analog); 15 (digital)	Butuan	8°53′6″N 125°29′11″E
D-10-XA	10 (analog)	Surigao City	9°48′16″N 125°27′11″E
DXRC	2 (analog)	Tandag	9°4′2″N 126°11′44″E
DXMJ	5 (analog); 37 (digital)	Davao City	7°4′24″N 125°34′33″E
DXBG	8 (analog); 34 (digital)	General Santos	6°8′19″N 125°10′45″E
DXLA	9 (analog); 41 (digital)	Zamboanga City	6°56′59″N 122°3′23″E
DXNS	12 (analog)	Cotabato City	7°12′40″N 124°15′1″E
DXLS	12 (analog)	Jolo, Sulu	6°2′59″N 120°59′58″E

== Controversies ==
=== Copyright infringement with ABS-CBN ===
On July 22, 2004, during the arrival of Angelo de la Cruz at Ninoy Aquino International Airport (a truck driver who was abducted by armed rebels west of Baghdad while transporting fuel from Saudi Arabia and then held hostage and threatened with beheading in Iraq), live news coverage was aired on GMA Network and other local television stations in the Philippines. GMA Network used audio-video coverage through Reuters, to which it subscribed. During the first five seconds of the live feed, GMA Network noticed that the Reuters feed was also being aired by another local station, its main competitor, ABS-CBN. The live video was intended only for ABS-CBN, but Reuters did not inform GMA Network of this restriction. The Court of Appeals dismissed the case filed by ABS-CBN Corporation against GMA Network Inc. over allegations of illegal copying of ABS-CBN's live video footage. In a ruling, the fourth division of the Court of Appeals set aside the Justice Department's resolution approving the filing of charges against GMA Network for violating Republic Act 8293 (the Intellectual Property Code). It ruled that GMA Network acted in good faith in airing the live video coverage because it had no intention of harming ABS-CBN Corporation. The court also said GMA Network acted in good faith by immediately stopping its use of the Reuters live feed after learning that ABS-CBN was also covering the event and by subsequently trying to verify the restriction agreement between ABS-CBN and Reuters. The court also stressed that, apart from GMA Network's lack of intent to infringe ABS-CBN's copyright, its use of the video did not constitute an infringement under Sections 212.4 and 185.1 of Republic Act 8293 because it involved only a short excerpt of the overall material.

=== TV ratings ===
On December 20, 2007, Judge Charito Gonzales of Quezon City Regional Trial Court Branch 80 released a temporary restraining order on TV ratings surveys based on a civil case filed by ABS-CBN Corporation versus AGB Nielsen Media Research Philippines. ABS-CBN Corporation accused competitor GMA Network Inc. of funding bribing operations in Bacolod City, to discredit the former. The local court in the Philippines further ordered ABS-CBN Corporation to file comment on the plea of AGB Nielsen Media Research Philippines for the alleged gathering and dissemination of television ratings data, within five days or until December 22, 2007. On December 21, 2007, a local AM radio station in the Philippines, owned by ABS-CBN Corporation, DZMM field reporter Junrie Hidalgo reported a news story entitled "AGB Nielsen, umamin sa dayaan: GMA Network, tahasang itinurong nasa likod ng dayaan" ("AGB Nielsen admits to cheating: GMA Network aggressively accused of being behind the cheating") during the radio program of Showbiz Mismo, hosted by Cristy Fermin and Jobert Sucaldito. The news story is based on an interview of AGB Nielsen general manager Maya Reforma regarding the purported cheating. In response, GMA Network Inc. aired a television plug reproving the purported unfair journalism and disagreed the accusations of ABS-CBN Corporation. GMA Network Inc. later filed a ₱15 million civil libel suit against ABS-CBN Corporation on January 3, 2008. The respondents included Hidalgo, Fermin, Sucaldito, the station and news manager of DZMM, writers and executive producers of television programs Bandila, Entertainment Live and The Buzz after the same story was aired locally. On January 7, 2008, the Quezon City Regional Trial Court junked ABS-CBN Corporation's suit against AGB Nielsen, saying the case was "prematurely filed" before the local court. Judge Gonzales' basis is the principle of mutuality of contracts, citing Article 1308 and 1196, New Civil Code of the Philippines. Also, Judge Samuel Gaerlan, Quezon City Regional Trial Court Branch 92 issued court summons against ABS-CBN Corporation and 15 of its personnel on January 3, 2008. On January 17, 2008, Judge Gaerlan recused himself from the case, considering that he has a cousin working in the legal department of ABS-CBN Corporation. The case was later re-raffled on January 28, 2008, and the case was eventually assigned to Judge Henri Inting of Branch 95 of the Quezon City Regional Trial Court. On February 14, 2008, Judge Inting issued a temporary restraining order barring local television station, ABS-CBN from airing defamatory statements against GMA Network Inc.

=== Lawsuit against TV5 ===
In December 2008, GMA Network Inc., Citynet Television, and ZOE Broadcasting Network filed a lawsuit against the management of TV5, alleging that MPB Primedia Inc. (a subsidiary of Media Prima Berhad, a Malaysian company that entered into a block-time agreement with Associated Broadcasting Company to sell TV5 airtime) had violated Article XVI, Section 3, of the 1987 Philippine Constitution. GMA Network Inc. argues that foreign entities are restricted from operating and owning a Filipino company, especially in broadcast media. GMA Network Inc. alleges that MPB Primedia Inc. was established to skirt the anti-dummy laws and enter into an unlawful block-time deal.

=== Death of Eddie Garcia ===
Eddie Garcia's sudden accident and death raised concerns regarding safety protocols on the set of Rosang Agimat, as there was no standby medical team or ambulance available. The unconscious Garcia was lifted from the pavement by non-medical personnel, who carried him to a passing taxicab. Several people, including his wife Lilibeth, said the accident could have been prevented if GMA Network's management had taken safety precautions. The Directors' Guild of the Philippines Inc. (DGPI) referred to Garcia's death as "a sad and urgent reminder to the film and television industries that safety protocols at work and on set are of paramount importance". The Department of Labor and Employment (DOLE) and the Occupational Safety and Health Center (OSHC) started an investigation into the circumstances of Garcia's accident and death. The OSHC found some occupational safety and health (OSH)-related violations on the part of GMA Network based on an uploaded online video of Garcia's accident, such as lack of first-aid, medical supplies, and a stretcher. They also said Garcia was "carried by personnel using bare hands". On September 4, the DOLE added GMA Network failed to submit an incident report within 24 hours after the accident. On December 23, the DOLE fined GMA Network ₱890,000.00 because of the incident. The network submitted an appeal in response to the ruling.

=== Sexual abuse lawsuit ===
On August 1, 2024, actor Sandro Muhlach filed an administrative complaint with GMA Network's management against Richard Dode Cruz, GMA head writer and Jojo Tawasil Nones, GMA content creator and creative consultant. The case is anchored on sexual abuse after the GMA Gala 2024 event held inside the Manila Marriott Hotel suite on July 20, 2024, where Sandro got intoxicated and was eventually led by the suspects to a room. Because of Sandro's requested confidentiality, the Network said it will only publish the details after conclusion of the investigation. Pending the inquiry, Nones was removed as the 2nd Unit Director of then-upcoming drama series, Prinsesa ng City Jail (2025). Earlier, Muhlach, Diane Abby Tupaz and Angela Kristine, in Facebook cryptic statements accused the suspects and demanded justice for Sandro. Nones and Cruz's lawyer, Atty. Maggie Abraham-Garduque released a public appeal to honor the ongoing probe and desist from publishing defamatory remarks.

Atty. Annette Gozon-Valdes suspended the respondents who denied the accusation in their counter-affidavit filed with the NBI. Before the Philippine Senate Committee on Public Information and Mass Media, they also denied the allegations of Sandro who underwent behavioural sciences counseling. Sandro virtually attended the third Senate panel probe and also filed with the DOJ rape through sexual assault complaint punished by R.A. 8353, "The Anti-Rape Law of 1997.

In 2024, Gerald Santos disclosed that he had been raped in 2005 by Danny Tan, a musical director of GMA Network when he was 15 years old. He further told the Senate Committee, his four suicide attempts due to the psychotrauma.

=== Unfair labor practices ===
In a decision released on January 24, 2026, the Supreme Court of the Philippines ruled that the company engaged in what has been popularly termed "labor-only contracting", i.e. "that an employer-employee relationship exists between GMA and respondents ("talents")."

=== Libel allegations ===
Amid the ongoing impeachment trial of Sara Duterte, congressman Paolo Duterte, Davao City's 1st district representative filed libel and cyber libel complaints against executives of the network (President and COO Gozon, CEO Duavit Jr.), including personalities from GMA News (reporter Darlene Cay; and anchors of 24 Oras: Vicky Morales, Emil Sumangil and Mel Tiangco), along with Melvin Matibag, director of the National Bureau of Investigation, dismissed policeman Rodulfo Gracioso Jr., and others following a report about alleged bribe of cash delivery to the Duterte family. The network has yet to receive the copy of the complaint.
