= DWAI-TV =

Television station in Naga, Camarines Sur, Philippines

GMA TV-7 Naga (DWAI-TV)
Relay of DZBB-TV

- GMA Naga's transmitter and former studio
- Philippines
- City: Naga, Camarines Sur
- Channels: Analog: 7 (VHF); Digital: 38 (UHF) (ISDB-T) (test broadcast); Virtual: 7.01
- Branding: GMA TV-7 Naga; GMA Camarines Sur; GMA Bicol

Programming
- Subchannels: See list
- Affiliations: GMA Network

Ownership
- Owner: GMA Network, Inc.
- Sister stations: DZDP-TV (GTV); Barangay LS 101.5 Naga

History
- First air date: 1986; 40 years ago (original launch); 2009; 17 years ago (as an originating station); February 1, 2021; 5 years ago (as a relaunch and originating station); August 30, 2024; 2 years ago (as a relay station of DZBB-TV)
- Last air date: April 24, 2015; 11 years ago (due to network-wide strategic streamlining and retrenchments, downgrading Channel 7 to a satellite relay station); August 30, 2024; 2 years ago (due to cost-cutting measures was downgraded into a relay (satellite-selling station))

Technical information
- Licensing authority: NTC
- Power: 30 kW (analog); 10 kW (digital)
- ERP: 62.42 kW (analog)
- Transmitter coordinates: 13°37′10″N 123°11′51″E
- Repeater: see § Rebroadcasters

Links
- Website: GMANetwork.com

DWAI-TV (VHF channel 7) is a local television station in Naga, Camarines Sur, Philippines, airing programming from the GMA network. It is owned and operated by the network's namesake corporate parent alongside GTV outlet DZDP-TV (channel 28) and DWQW (101.5 FM). All GMA Naga stations share transmitters at the GMA Broadcast Complex, Barangay Concepcion Pequeña.

== History ==
- 1986 - GMA began broadcasting in Naga, Camarines Sur, on Channel 7 after GMA 12 Legazpi’s 1978 launch. Following the People Power Revolution, the station used a variation of the GMA Radio-Television Arts ident, featuring a light blue square logo with white text and a circle 7 logo similar to those used by ABC affiliates in the U.S. In later years, it adopted rainbow-colored stripes in red, yellow, green, and blue.
- April 30, 1992 - With the launch of the Rainbow Satellite Network, GMA Channel 7 Naga began nationwide satellite broadcasts, delivering live Manila-sourced programming from flagship station DZBB-TV to viewers in the Bicol Region. The rebranding introduced a new logo featuring a satellite-beaming rainbow with traditional red, orange, yellow, green, blue, indigo, and violet stripes, and a metallic “GMA” in Futura Extra Bold font with an indigo hue.
- 2009 - GMA Naga was launched as the network’s satellite station for the Bicol Region.
- September 10, 2010 - GMA Naga began local operations and upgraded to an originating station with the daily news bulletin Flash Bulletin. This was followed by the launch of its first locally produced program, Bicolandia Isyu Ngonian, on November 22 of the same year.
- August 10, 2012 - GMA Naga was upgraded to a “super station” and rebranded as GMA Bicol, primarily covering Camarines Sur (DWAI Ch. 7) and Albay (DWLA Ch. 12).
- September 17, 2012 - Weeks after its launch, GMA Bicol premiered its flagship local newscast Baretang Bikol, expanding coverage to the entire Bicol region.
- April 24, 2015 - GMA Network canceled local programming in Naga as part of strategic streamlining, downgrading the station to a relay station that broadcasts Metro Manila programs via DZBB-TV.
- February 1, 2021 - GMA Bicol resumed local operations and was re-upgraded to an originating station with the relaunch of its regional newscast Balitang Bicolandia, covering the entire Bicol Region.
- November 9, 2021 - GMA Bicol commenced its ISDB-T digital test broadcast on UHF Channel 38, covering Naga and the whole of Camarines Sur.
- August 30, 2024 - GMA Bicol halted local operations for the second time after Balitang Bicolandia aired its final broadcast, pausing for over three years due to network cost-cutting. The Bicol stations were downgraded again to relay stations of DZBB-TV.

== Previously aired local programs ==
- Flash Bulletin
- Let's Fiesta
- Bicolandia Isyu Ngonian
- Baretang Bikol
- 24 Oras Bikol
- Visita Iglesia
- Balitang Bicolandia
- Word of God Network
- Peñafrancia Festival

== Digital television ==
=== Digital channels ===
DWAI-TV's digital signal operates on UHF channel 38 (617.143 MHz) and broadcasts on the following subchannels:

Channel	Video	Aspect	Short name	Programming	Note
07.01	480i	4:3	GMA	GMA Naga (relay stations of DZBB-TV)	Commercial broadcast (10 kW)
07.02	480i	4:3	GTV	GTV	Commercial broadcast (10 kW)
07.03	480i	4:3	HEART OF ASIA	Heart of Asia	Commercial broadcast (10 kW)
07.07	480i	4:3	I HEART MOVIES	I Heart Movies	Commercial broadcast (10 kW)
07.35	240p	4:3	GMA1SEG	GMA Naga Relay	1seg broadcast

== Rebroadcasters ==
Before its closure as an originating station, it had five relay stations, with TV-8 Daet being the latest to be commissioned in March 2014.

Relay stations
Callsign	Location (Transmitter Site)	Channel	TPO	Coordinates
DWGC	Daet	8 (analog, VHF)	2 kW (analog)	14°5′49″N 122°57′19″E
DWLA	Legazpi, Albay	12 (analog, VHF); 41 (digital, UHF)	10 kW (39.95 kW ERP) (analog); 10 kW (digital)	13°6′58″N 123°43′38″E
D-13-ZC	Virac, Catanduanes	13 (analog, VHF)	2 kW (analog)	13°36′25″N 124°13′52″E
DWGA	Juban, Sorsogon	2 (analog, VHF)	2 kW (10.627 kW ERP) (analog)	12°47′44″N 123°56′18″E
DYRD	Mobo, Masbate	7 (analog, VHF)	1 kW (analog)	12°20′40″N 123°38′29″E

== Area of coverage ==
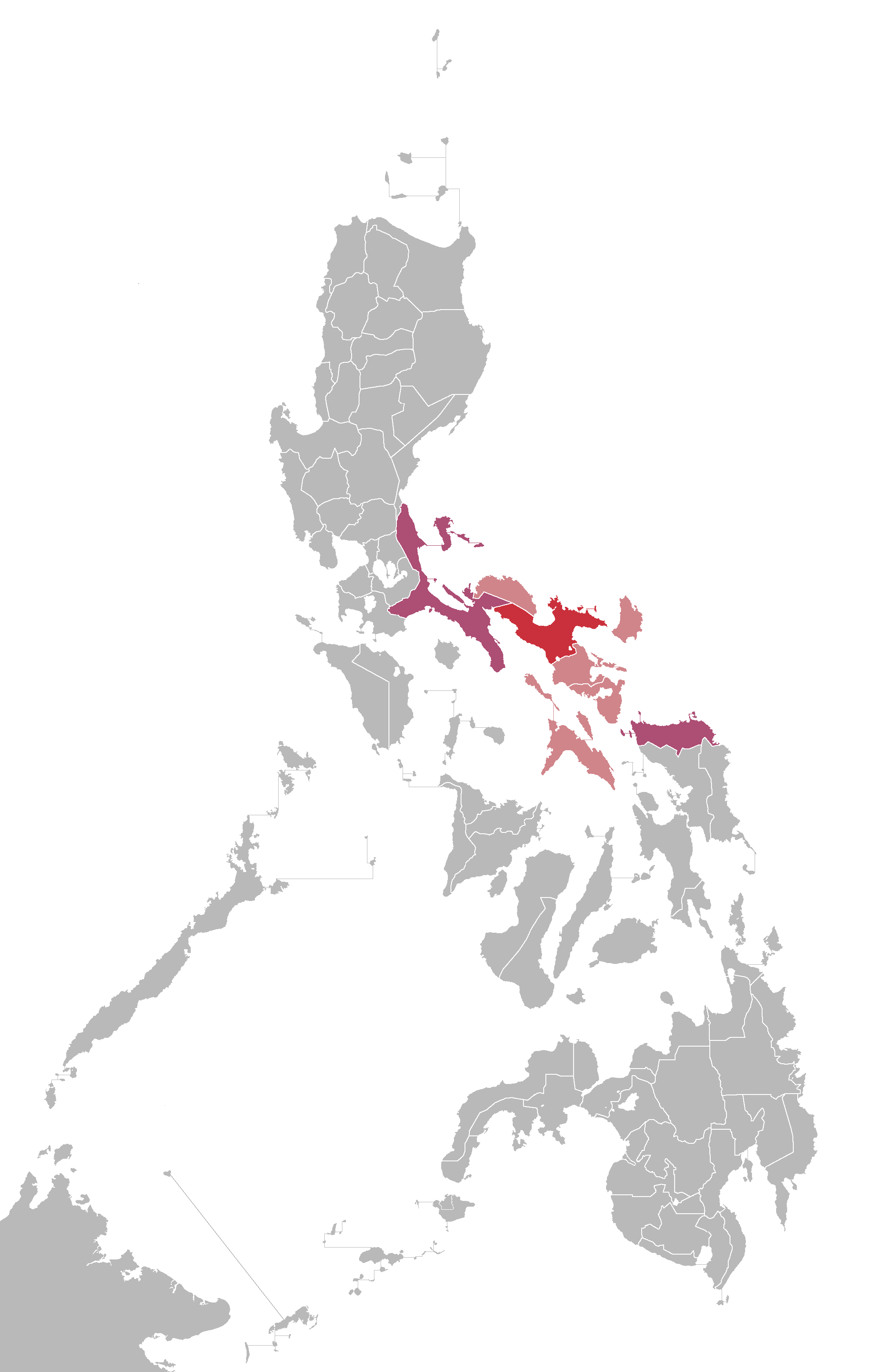
Red: GMA Bicol Light red and red: Audience of GMA Bicol Violet: Areas that may receive signals from GMA Bicol

- Portions of Camarines Sur (including Naga City)

== See also ==
- DWQW-FM
- List of GMA Network stations
