= DZBB-TV =

GMA TV-7 Manila (DZBB-TV)
- Quezon City; Philippines
- Channels: Analog: 7 (VHF) (until January 15, 2027; 53 days' time; Digital: 15 (UHF) (ISDB-T); Virtual: 7
- Branding: GMA TV-7 Manila

Programming
- Subchannels: See list
- Affiliations: 7.1: GMA; 7.2: GTV; 7.3: Heart of Asia; 7.4: I Heart Movies

Ownership
- Owner: GMA Network Inc.
- Sister stations: DWDB-TV (GTV); DZBB-AM (Super Radyo DZBB 594); DWLS (Barangay LS 97.1)

History
- Founded: October 29, 1961
- Former channel numbers: Digital: 27 (UHF, 2013–19)
- Former affiliations: RBS (1961—1974); Digital subchannels: DepEd TV (2020–22); Hallypop (2020–24); Pinoy Hits (2023–24)
- Call sign meaning: DZ; Bisig; Bayan (also used by sister radio station DZBB) or "Uncle BoB" Stewart (founder; deceased)

Technical information
- Licensing authority: NTC
- Power: Analog: 100,000 watts Digital: 15,000 watts
- ERP: Analog: 1,000 kW; Digital: 100,000 watts (75,000 watts on-operational)
- Transmitter coordinates: 14.67008°N 121.05006°E

Links
- Website: gmanetwork.com

DZBB-TV (VHF Channel 7 Analog, UHF Channel 15 Digital) is a television station in Metro Manila, Philippines, serving as the flagship of the GMA television network. The digital service is known as DZBB-DTV by only a few people. It is owned and operated by the network's namesake corporate parent alongside GTV flagship DWDB-TV (channel 27). Its studios are located at the GMA Network Center, EDSA corner Timog Avenue, Diliman, Quezon City, while DZBB-TV's hybrid analog and digital transmitting facilities are located at the GMA Tower of Power, Tandang Sora Avenue, Barangay Culiat, Quezon City, with single-frequency network (SFN) relay towers located at the PBCom Tower in Makati, Zen Towers in Manila, Antipolo, Angeles City, Cabanatuan, Malolos, and Jalajala.

The station, not to be confused with Channel 13 in Aparri, Cagayan in which had the same callsign (DZBB) also owned and operated by the network itself, as listed by the NTC.

== History ==
=== Early history: Stewart era ===
DZBB-TV traces its history to Metro Manila radio station DZBB, owned by Loreto F. de Hemedes, Inc. In 1943, Robert "Uncle Bob" Stewart, an icon and a pioneer of Philippine television who founded the RBS, was assigned in Manila during World War II as a war correspondent for United Press (UP). He fell in love with the country and its people, resigned from UP in 1945 and opted to call the Philippines his home. In 1948, Stewart met with Loreto Feliciano, a widow from Pampanga with three children, and they got married the following year.

Stewart opened an AM radio station DZBB, which began broadcasting from a makeshift studio on the 4th floor of Calvo Building in Escolta, Binondo, Manila on March 1, 1950, which was then the shopping avenue of the then-capital city Manila. This marked the birth of Republic Broadcasting System (RBS) in 1963, becoming the top-rated TV network in the Philippine broadcasting industry.

After the success of its radio station, the company decided to expand into television. RBS Channel 7 began broadcasting on October 29, 1961, the fourth television station in the Philippines (after ABS Channel 3 and CBN Channel 9, which were owned by the Bolinao Electronics Corporation (now ABS-CBN Corporation) which used to operate Channel 2 and IBC Channel 13 by the Inter-Island Broadcasting Corporation). The television network started its operations with just 25 employees (other stations had 200), a surplus transmitter, two old cameras and no lighting equipment and props.

The station was always in brink of bankruptcy and Stewart was about to give up, when the program "Dancetime with Chito" suddenly became an instant hit and advertising revenues started to pour in. Canned programs from the United States further sustained its success.

=== Martial Law period; GMA Radio-Television Arts (1974–1992) ===
On September 23, 1972, when then President Ferdinand Marcos declared martial law in the Philippines by the virtue of Proclamation 1081, RBS was forced to shut down. The station seized from RBS - DZBB-TV Channel 7, given the green light by the government to return on the air in December of that year with limited three-month permits. During that time, programming was supplied mostly via a blocktime agreement with Philippine Production Center Inc. (PPCI), a company led by former ABS-CBN executive Romeo Jalosjos.

In 1974, due to limited licenses, difficulty in financial obligations, and disallowing foreign citizens and entities from owning and operating media companies in the Philippines, Stewart and the American Broadcasting Company, which owned 25% of RBS, were forced to cede majority control to a triumvirate composed of Gilberto Duavit Sr., Menardo Jimenez and Felipe Gozon, who introduced a programming concept catering to the new audience. The new management acquired new equipment and introduced new programs under a new name, GMA Radio-Television Arts (GMA stood for Greater Manila Area) with its new identity, "Where You Belong" was used from 1978 to 1982 and from 1990 to 1994. On May 28, 1974, the corporate name was renamed Republic Broadcasting System. Rod Reyes, then-general manager and executive vice president of RBS, recruited old-timers from ABS-CBN, including those from its news and entertainment divisions. By that time, DZBB-TV Channel 7 began to broadcast in color.

The relaunched GMA, aside from sporting a light blue square logo with the network name in white, also had a circle 7 logo in use, in its final years the blue circle 7 logo used was similar to those used by the ABC in some United States cities. As GMA prepares for a network reformatting, GMA Radio-Television Arts used the beaming rainbow colors of red, yellow, green and blue stripes, and the same "Where You Belong" slogan were used in a different Serif font.

In August 1983, DZBB-TV Channel 7 was the only station broadcast the funeral of Senator Ninoy Aquino. At that time, it was a small item due to immediate censorship. But, the station bravely broadcast the coverage with a limit of 10 seconds on free TV. In response, President Ferdinand Marcos issued a warning to the station or else they will share the same fate of other networks, especially ABS-CBN.

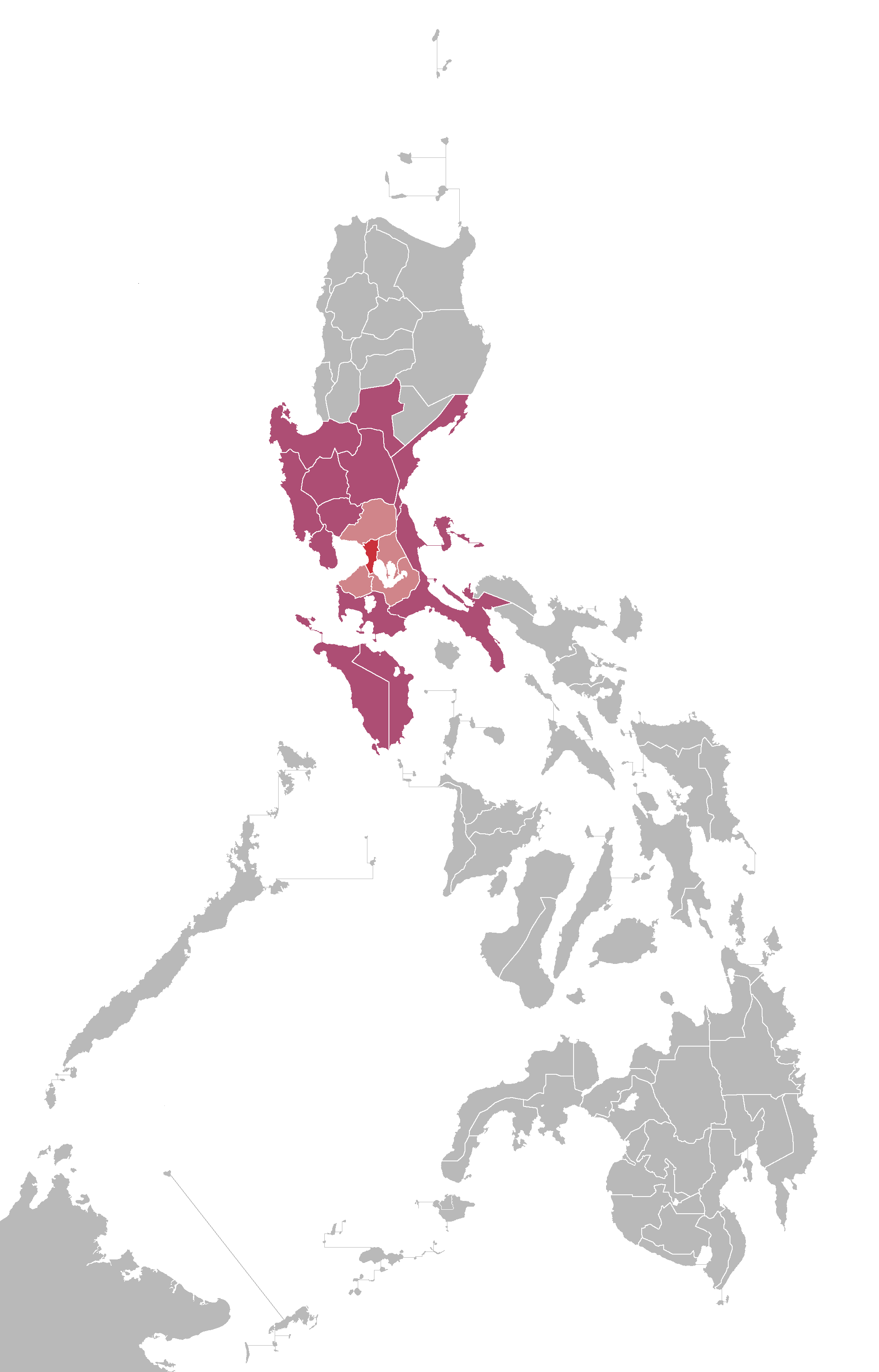
Red: Home location of GMA 7 Manila Light red and red: Market audience of GMA 7 Manila Violet: Areas that may receive signals from GMA 7 Manila

When democracy in the Philippines was restored in the People Power Revolution in 1986, other television stations began to air, some with their original owners. The political instability of the country also added to the station's burden, when the military stormed into its studios for two days as part of a coup attempt to topple then President Corazon Aquino.

In July 1987, GMA introduced its new dimension in television broadcasting as the network was transmitted in full stereo, dubbed as GMA StereoVision, and became the first Philippine TV station to broadcast programs in full stereo until 1998 when it switched to the current 120 kilowatt capacity.

On November 7, 1988, DZBB-TV officially inaugurated a new 100,000 watt transmitter in Tandang Sora Avenue, Quezon City. Known as the "Tower of Power", which initially operated on a 50 kilowatt transmitting output from 1988 to 1998, the 777 ft (236.8 m) transmitter helped improve the channel's reception in Luzon, and was also the tallest man-made structure in the country at the time. After the inauguration, a grand TV special was started and it has used a slogan name "GMA-7-POWER" as the station ID aired since the network's Tower of Power opened. By 1998, DZBB upgraded its transmission to 120,000 watt using its new solid state transmitter from Harris.

=== Rainbow Satellite era and Kapuso Network (1992–present) ===
On April 30, 1992, GMA was relaunched as the Rainbow Satellite identity. Through its nationwide satellite broadcast, GMA's national programs were seen across the Philippine archipelago and Southeast Asia with its programming started airing in 60 American cities and parts of South America through the International Channel Network. The new logo was a rainbow beamed by a satellite with the colors of red, orange, yellow, green, blue, indigo and violet, and GMA in blue color uses a Sans Serif Futura Extra Bold and analogous gloominess of Indigo as its fonts to the letters. Underneath its logo was their slogan from 1975, "Where You Belong" in Serif style font. Following that year, it expanded into thirty-three affiliate stations nationwide, making it the country's largest TV network.

In 1993, GMA became the first television station to win a Gold Medal in the prestigious New York Festivals for the Best Station ID.

From January 10 to 15, 1995, GMA was the official broadcaster of the 1995 World Youth Day, a Catholic youth festival that took place in Manila, Philippines, brings the highlights of the historic visit of Pope John Paul II to the Philippines.

From December 31, 1999 to January 1, 2000, GMA was the Philippine broadcaster for 2000 Today, the most-successful international television special that commemorated the dawn of the new millennium. By that time, it was the only television network to go on 24-hour non-stop broadcasting, a schedule that continue until 2001 when the network was forced to reduced back its regular broadcast hours in compliance with the National Telecommunications Commission's rules and regulations for affiliated free-to-air TV stations.

On June 14, 2000, GMA inaugurated its GMA Network Center complex in EDSA corner Timog Avenue, Diliman, Quezon City, as part of the kick-off of the network's year-round celebration of its 50th golden anniversary. The complex is the main headquarters and the main radio and television production hub of GMA Network.

On October 27, 2002, during an episode of the network's now defunct noontime variety show SOP, GMA officially launch the new station ID and a slogan, "Kapuso ng Pamilyang Pilipino, Anumang Kulay ng Buhay (One in Heart With the Filipino Family, In Whatever Colors of Life)", featuring the "Kapuso" theme song is performed by Regine Velasquez. This station ID features a rainbow-colored heart shaped logo, the Kapuso, and a Century Gothic Bold font for the letters. By 2003, GMA is currently topping the number one ratings in Mega Manila, which later became ranked the network's top-rating TV stations nationwide since 2011.

In February 2013, GMA conducted a digital test broadcast with the ISDB-T standard via its UHF channel 27 (551.143 MHz) frequency.

In November 2025, the National Telecommunications Commission (NTC) issued a memorandum circular that planned to switch off analog television in Mega Manila in 12 months. On July 17, 2026, GMA announced that they are prepared to switch off its analog television service in Mega Manila on the upcoming mandated switch off on November 22. The analog shutdown date was extended by the NTC on November 17, 2026, from the original November 22, 2026, it became January 15, 2027.

== Digital television ==
=== Digital channels ===
DZBB-TV's digital signal operates on UHF channel 15 (479.143 MHz) and broadcasts on the following subchannels:

Channel	Video	Aspect	Short name	Programming	Note	Power kW (ERP)
7.01	480i	16:9	GMA	GMA (Main DZBB-TV programming)	Commercial broadcast	(15 kW; 100 kW ERP
7.02	480i	16:9	GTV	GTV (Main DWDB-TV programming)	Commercial broadcast	(15 kW; 100 kW ERP
7.03	480i	16:9	HEART OF ASIA	Heart of Asia	Commercial broadcast	(15 kW; 100 kW ERP
7.06	480i	16:9	I HEART MOVIES	I Heart Movies	Commercial broadcast	(15 kW; 100 kW ERP
7.07	480i	16:9	(UNNAMED)	Reserved Channel	Color bars	(15 kW; 100 kW ERP
7.08	480i	16:9	(UNNAMED)	Reserved Channel	Color bars	(15 kW; 100 kW ERP
7.11	480i	16:9	(UNNAMED)	Reserved Channel	Color bars	(15 kW; 100 kW ERP
7.21	240p	16:9	GMA 1-Seg	GMA	1seg	(15 kW; 100 kW ERP

According to a December 2017 press release, DZBB-TV's upgraded signal transmission covered the areas of Metro Manila, Rizal, Cavite, Laguna, Bulacan and parts of Pampanga, Bataan, Nueva Ecija and Batangas.

In 2018, National Telecommunications Commission released implementing rules and regulations on the re-allocation of the UHF Channels 14-20 (470–512 Megahertz (MHz) band) for digital terrestrial television broadcasting (DTTB) service. All operating and duly authorized Mega Manila VHF (very high frequency) television networks are entitled to a channel assignment from Channels 14 to 20.

In 2019, the NTC, through a memorandum circular, authorized GMA to operate UHF channel 15 (479.143 MHz) as its secondary channel to expand the usage of channels 14-20 for digital TV broadcasts. Following ZOE Broadcasting Network's decision not to renew its joint venture (GMA News TV) with GMA after June 2019, and a subsequent planned reactivation of DWDB-TV's analog signal for the rest of the GNTV's analog broadcast run, third-party sources reported that the station's digital signal will move to the assigned channel 15 frequency after channel 11's blocktime deal with GMA expires.

On May 15, 2019, GMA Network began to transmit its digital test broadcast on UHF Channel 15 (479.143 MHz) as its permanent frequency assigned by National Telecommunications Commission.

On February 27, 2023, the video output of DZBB-TV, along with GMA Network's other digital stations, had been officially migrated to 16:9 Anamorphic widescreen format.

== Areas of coverage ==
=== Primary Areas ===
- Metro Manila
- Bataan
- Pampanga
- Bulacan
- Cavite
- Laguna
- Rizal

=== Secondary Areas ===
- Southern Nueva Ecija
- Central Tarlac
- Northern Batangas
- Southern Quezon
- Portion of Aurora
- Portion of Zambales
- Northern Portion of Quezon

== See also ==
- GMA Network
- GTV
- List of GMA Network stations
- Barangay LS 97.1
- Super Radyo DZBB 594
