= Ratsada Balita =

- Title card since 2026
- Also known as: Ratsada; 24 Oras Western Visayas; Ratsada 24 Oras; One Western Visayas
- Genre: Newscast
- Presented by: Gerthrode Charlotte Tan; Adrian Prietos
- Narrated by: Rudje Mar Sucaldito; Al Torres; Weng Dela Peña; Gerthrode Charlotte Tan
- Country of origin: Philippines
- Original language: Hiligaynon

Production
- Running time: 25–30 minutes (Currently); 40–45 minutes (Formerly)
- Production company: GMA News

Original release
- Network: GMA 6 Iloilo
- Release: October 4, 1999 – November 13, 2015
- Network: GMA 6 Iloilo; GMA 13 Bacolod
- Release: August 27, 2018 – present

Ratsada Balita, formerly Ratsada, 24 Oras Western Visayas, Ratsada 24 Oras, and One Western Visayas, is a Philippine television newscast by GMA Iloilo. Originally anchored by Noly Calvo and Jeja Rose Pernan, it premiered on October 4, 1999. The newscast concluded on November 13, 2015, with Gerthrode Charlotte Tan and Atty. Jobert Peñaflorida served as the final anchors.

It premiered on June 29, 2026 after 11 years, and is anchored by Gerthrode Charlotte Tan and Adrian Prietos. Reporting from various areas across Guimaras, Iloilo and Negros Occidental are Kim Luden Salinas, Zen Quilantang-Sasa, John Sala, and Aileen Pedreso.

== Overview ==
Ratsada provides news and features on Iloilo City and Province of the same name, as well as the rest of Western Visayas. The newscast airs weekdays from 5:10pm to 5:35pm (formerly 5:00pm to 5:45pm) with its broadcast center located at MacArthur Drive, Jaro, Iloilo City. It is also heard on a slightly delayed basis through DYSI 1323 AM and simulcast over GMA Channel 2 Kalibo and GMA Channel 5 Roxas live.

Conceptualized by GMA Regional TV and GMA News and Public Affairs, the newscast, delivered in the Hiligaynon language, covers the significant and comprehensive news reports from Western Visayas, consisting of the Panay region (Iloilo, Aklan, Antique, Capiz, and Guimaras) and Negros Occidental (including Bacolod and Sipalay when it moved to the Negros Island Region). It was also the second GMA Regional TV newscast to use the ONE brand, which was first used by One Mindanao. With overall master control from the GMA broadcasting complex in Iloilo City, it is anchored in a currently dual-presenter format from separate locations, with a presenter each based, respectively, in GMA's regional studios in Iloilo City and Bacolod City.

Ratsada Balita is also aired via satellite through relay stations GMA TV-10 Sipalay, TV-30 Murcia, TV-5 Roxas, and TV-2 Kalibo, and it is also replayed on DYSI AM 1323 kHz Super Radyo Iloilo and Barangay RU 92.9 Super Radyo Kalibo on a slightly delayed basis at 6:00pm. The program also has its international broadcasts through GMA News TV.

Ratsada Balita (or One Western Visayas by its former name) was also re-aired for national viewers under GTV’s late-night block "Regional TV Strip" on a weekly basis. It aired every Wednesday at 11:50 PM from May 20, 2020 to July 21, 2021.

== History ==
=== 1987-1999: Pre-launch ===
Before Ratsada's existence, GMA TV-6 Iloilo first aired a local newscast called Banat which premiered in February 1987. The news program was short-lived and was replaced by the local version of GMA Headline News which was the only English-language local newscast that aired from 1988 to 1992. In 1996, the station aired a 15-minute local newscast entitled Bantay which was also short-lived and was replaced by the local version of Saksi Western Visayas. When GMA relaunched the Iloilo station in 1999, it decided to produce an all-new local newscast, which became Ratsada: GMA Super Balita.

=== 1999-2014: As Ratsada ===
Titlecard as Ratsada used when their theme and graphics were updated and kept their former newscast's title until November 7, 2014.

The newscast began its airing on October 4, 1999. It was one of the three regional newscasts initially launched by the network along with Balitang Bisdak of GMA Cebu and Testigo of GMA Davao (now One Mindanao) under the banner of GMA Super Balita. Jeja Rose Pornan-Simeon and Noly Calvo were the first anchors of the said news program. Noly Calvo eventually became the sole anchor.

In 2002, Calvo and Pornan-Simeon were replaced by Gerthrode Charlotte Tan and Christopher Misajon, who was known as "Mr. Ratsada". The tandem of Tan and Misajon lasted until September 23, 2004, when Misajon was shot by a group of robbers and died two days later.

In September 27, 2004, Misajon was replaced by Jonathan Gellangarin, who is a well-known radio personality in Western Visayas.

In October 2007, Ratsada began its simulcast on GMA Bacolod. The simulcast lasted until November 19, 2010, in preparation for the launch of its own regional news program, Isyu Subong Negrense, and later returned in November 2012 until 2013, airing the two programs back-to-back.

In 2009, Tan temporarily left the newscast due to health concerns, leaving Gellangarin as the main anchor of the program until 2010.

In 2012, Gellangarin left the newscast and was replaced by Mark Nunieza, joining Tan as her co-anchor.

=== 2014-2015: As 24 Oras Western Visayas ===
Titlecard as 24 Oras Western Visayas used until July 17, 2015.

Following changes of 24 Oras (its now-main newscast), Ratsada was rebranded as 24 Oras Western Visayas on November 10, 2014. Lawyer and local broadcast journalist Atty. Jobert Peñaflorida took Nunieza's place, who continued his reportorial job on the newscast.

=== 2015: As Ratsada 24 Oras ===
Titlecard of Ratsada 24 Oras from July 20 to November 13, 2015.

On July 20, 2015, 24 Oras Western Visayas was retitled Ratsada 24 Oras, similar to Luzon version.

After more than 16 years (with Ratsada and 24 Oras Western Visayas' history inclusion), Ratsada 24 Oras went off-air on November 13, 2015, following the layoffs of more than 20 personnel in the Iloilo station (reporters, cameramen, and technical personnel) as part of streamlining of operations reverted to GMA programs (since April opposite 24 Oras Ilokano of GMA Ilocos, 24 Oras Bikol of GMA Bicol, Isyu Subong Negrense of GMA Bacolod and 24 Oras Northern Mindanao of GMA Northern Mindanao for having their final broadcast).

=== 2018-2026: As GMA Regional TV One Western Visayas ===
Almost three years after Ratsada was cancelled, GMA Iloilo returned as an originating station with the launching of the new newscast, One Western Visayas. Correspondents Joecel Huesca and Julius Belaca-Ol joined the newscast as its executive producer and correspondent. Launched on August 27, 2018, the newscast marked the return of GMA Iloilo as an originating station, almost three years after it was reduced to a relay station of GMA 7 Manila due to mass layoffs and financial difficulties brought about by the streamlining of GMA Regional TV's operations. This is produced by GMA Iloilo and GMA Bacolod stations, which, before the initial closure of their news departments, aired separate news programs Ratsada 24 Oras (formerly Ratsada and 24 Oras Western Visayas) and Isyu Subong Negrense, respectively.

On March 18, 2019, GMA Bacolod opened its studio, which has been used for the newscast until today. Before the launch of its studio, reports and headlines from Bacolod and the rest of Negros Occidental were aired live from the GMA Bacolod Control Room.

On May 27, 2019, Atty. Sedfrey Cabaluna (also a then high-ranking officer at the Department of Tourism Region VI) temporarily left the newscast. Despite that, the program still maintained a tri-anchor format when reporters Darylle Marie Sarmiento and Zen Quilantang-Sasa took turns as his replacement.

On July 29, 2019, the newscast unveiled a minor revision of its logo, changing its font color to green, reflecting its co-produced national newscast GMA Regional TV Weekend News (later Regional TV Weekend News, now Regional TV News), which was launched on July 27. It was relaunched on August 12, adopting graphics and studio sets for Iloilo and Bacolod stations similar to its sister regional newscasts Balitang Amianan (now One North Central Luzon) and Balitang Bisdak. The newscast also opened its doors to audiences every Friday, but this was halted in March 2020 due to the COVID-19 pandemic.

Atty. Sedfrey Cabaluna returned to the newscast on March 16, 2020, reuniting with co-anchors Rivilla and Prietos. Sarmiento and Quilantang-Sasa, meanwhile, continued working for the newscast as regional correspondents.

From June 29 to July 10, 2020, the program expanded its coverage and carried over reports from the Central and Eastern Visayas regions owing to GMA Regional TV's decision to temporarily suspend GMA Cebu's operations due to a COVID-19 outbreak in Cebu City. With that, the newscast, in the interim, was de facto named GMA Regional TV's Unified Newscast in Visayas, One Western Visayas-Balitang Bisdak Newscast. It was filmed at the GMA Iloilo Broadcasting Complex, with headlines delivered in the Filipino language. Cabaluna and Rivilla continued as anchors of the interim newscast, with Bobby Nalzaro of Balitang Bisdak joining in as a co-anchor three days later, temporarily replacing Adrian Prietos. Correspondents from GMA Iloilo and GMA Bacolod delivered their news in Hiligaynon, while reporters from GMA Cebu used Cebuano. This incidentally marked a return of a multilingual newscast by the network since the first incarnation of GMA Davao's One Mindanao, which used Cebuano and Filipino but later switched to solely using Cebuano. The interim Visayan region-wide newscast ended on July 13, 2020, as GMA Cebu resumed production of its local programs, including Balitang Bisdak. The program also reverted its overall delivery medium to the Hiligaynon language, with Prietos returning to the newscast as a co-anchor.

Atty. Sedfrey Cabaluna left the newscast once again on September 24, 2021, to run for politics and was elected as the City Councilor of the Lone District of Iloilo City, and temporarily adopted the two-anchor format together with the other regional newscasts. Co-anchor Juan Manuel Dela Cena joined the anchor team on April 4, 2022, and stayed until June 10. Returning veteran broadcaster and former Ratsada 24 Oras anchorwoman Gerthrode Charlotte Tan joined the anchor team on September 4, 2023, returning once again to the network after eight years, regaining her role as lead anchor.

On December 29, 2023, Rivilla and Ashley Liza marked their final appearance.

On September 2, 2024, the newscast tweaked a major revision of its title card. It changed its font color to blue, the logo for GMA Regional TV was removed, and the graphics and OBB were changed to reflect it under GMA Integrated News.

28 days later, on September 30, 2024, the GMA Integrated News OBB replaced the GMA Regional TV's own OBB. The display of the headlines is also changed, with the main headline serving as the title and the program's name serving as the subtitle.

On May 12, 2025, the OBB changed, and Al Torres officially retired, being replaced by Weng dela Peña.

On September 29, 2025, the news program (One Western Visayas) became available via livestream on GMA Regional TV's social media accounts, alongside Balitang Bisdak, One North Central Luzon, and One Mindanao.

After seven years and 10 months of delivering news and information for Western Visayas, One Western Visayas ended on June 26, 2026. On June 27, 2026, Ratsada Balita started airing. GMA Kalibo and GMA Capiz joined GMA Iloilo and GMA Bacolod in airing the new local newscast after being downgraded to relay station that broadcasts Metro Manila programs via DZBB-TV for both areas.

=== 2026-Present: As GMA Regional TV Ratsada Balita ===
To conform with the newest changes, Ratsada Balita is among the first to change the second word to red, signaling the end of the integrated era. On June 29, 2026, alongside the GMA News intro, new theme music is used.

== Area of coverage ==
- Iloilo City and Province
- Bacolod City and Negros Occidental
- Roxas City and Capiz
- Kalibo and Aklan
- San Jose de Buenavista and Antique
- Jordan and Guimaras

== Segments ==
=== Current segments ===
- Tsapa Reports
- Tatak Ratsada (Special Report)
- Ratsada Exclusive
- Ipa-Ratsada Mo!
- Mga Istorya ni Alyas Kanor
- Ratsada Express
- Money-Obra (May Trabaho Ka)
- Isports Lang
- Hayop sa Balita (Carried over from One Western Visayas)
- Kapuso Serbisyo
- Lakat sang Panahon (Carried over from One Western Visayas)
- Astig
- Fies-TA! (Carried over from One Western Visayas)
- Namit!
- Kuwento ng Pilipino (Carried over from One Western Visayas)
- Health Watch (Carried over from One Western Visayas)
- #SpreadKindness (Carried over from One Western Visayas)
- Showbits (Carried over from One Western Visayas)
- Oil Price Watch

=== Final segments ===
==== As One Western Visayas ====
- Bae ng Bayan
- Balitang Barangay
- Batang Petmalu
- Bantay Presyo
- Breaking News
- Bongga!
- HIV Watch
- Iskul Ko 'To
- Kapuso Barangayan
  - Kapuso Barangayan on Wheels
- Kapuso Lodi
- Kapuso ng Kalikasan
- Lagaw Ta!
- Ipa-One Western Visayas mo!
- My Western Visayas
- Namit Gid!/Food Trip
- Nga'a Man?
- Ratsada Balita
- RTV Presents
- Viral na 'to!
- 'Yan ang Pinoy!

==== As Ratsada, 24 Oras Western Visayas, and Ratsada 24 Oras ====
- Kapuso Barangayan (Carried over to One Western Visayas)
- I M Ready
- Side Line
- Ratsada MoJo (portmanteau for Mobile Journalist)

== Anchors ==
=== Current anchors ===
- Gerthrode Charlotte Tan
- Adrian Prietos (Co-anchor, Regional correspondent and reporter, GMA Bacolod)

== Correspondents ==
=== Current correspondents ===
- Joecel Huesca (Program manager)
- Julius Belaca-Ol (Supervising producer)
- Rudje Mar Sucaldito (Supervising producer)
- Thessalonia Ordales (Senior Desk manager)
- Aileen Pedreso (News producer, Bacolod, and Substitute anchor for Prietos)
- Zen Quilantang-Sasa (Iloilo correspondent)
- John Sala (Iloilo correspondent)
- Kim Luden Salinas (News producer, Iloilo, and Substitute anchor for Tan)

== Former anchors and correspondents ==
- Jeja Rose Pornan
- Noly Calvo
- Chris Misajon†
- Alvin Dennis Arabang
- Jonathan Gellangarin
- Mark Nunieza
- Atty. Jobert Peñaflorida
- Atty. Sedfrey Cabaluna (Main anchor and senior desk manager)
- Kaitlene Rivilla
- Fabienne Paderes
- Alessa Quimsing†
- Carol Velagio-Sobejano
- Jason Gregorio
- Jowelie Docdocil
- Jennifer Munieza-Jumaquio
- Mavic Tse Wing
- Bernard Bernal
- Samantha Jalandoni
- Enrico Surita Jr.
- Charlene Belvis
- Nenita Hobilla
- Juan Manuel Dela Cena
- Darylle Marie Sarmiento (Iloilo correspondent)
- Ashley Liza (Senior desk manager)
