= D-7-ZG-TV =

Television station in Peñarrubia, Abra, Philippines

GMA TV-7 Abra (D-7-ZG-TV)
Relay of DZEA-TV
- Philippines
- Channels: Analog: 7 (VHF)
- Branding: GMA TV-7 Abra

Programming
- Affiliations: GMA

Ownership
- Owner: GMA Network Inc.

History
- First air date: 1979

Technical information
- Licensing authority: NTC
- Power: 1 kW
- Transmitter coordinates: 17°33′18″N 120°40′20″E

Links
- Website: gmanetwork.com

D-7-ZG-TV (VHF channel 7) is a television station in Abra, Philippines, airing programming from GMA TV-7 Manila (DZBB-TV) and GMA TV-10 Benguet/Dagupan (DZEA-TV). Owned and operated by the network's namesake corporate parent, the station maintains transmitter facilities at Brgy. Lusuac, Peñarrubia, Abra.

From 2012, it became a relay station for GMA TV-48 Ilocos Sur (DWBC-TV) to air Balitang Ilokano (later as 24 Oras Ilokano) until its cancellation in 2015. Since October 2016, it has been relayed through GMA Dagupan to air Balitang Amianan (later as One North Central Luzon).

== GMA TV-7 Abra current programs ==
- One North Central Luzon

== GMA TV-7 Abra former programs ==
- Balitang Ilokano
- 24 Oras Ilokano
- Mornings with GMA Regional TV

== Area of coverage ==
- Portion of Abra

== See also ==
- DWBC-TV
- DZEA-TV
- List of GMA Network stations
