= One North Central Luzon =

Philippine television news show

- Title card since 2026
- Also known as: 24 Oras North Central Luzon; 24 Oras Amianan; Balitang Amianan
- Genre: News broadcasting
- Directed by: Nestor Casela
- Presented by: Cris Zuñiga
- Narrated by: CJ Torida; Al Torres; Weng dela Peña
- Country of origin: Philippines
- Original language: Tagalog

Production
- Executive producers: Glam Calicdan-Dizon; Jerick James Pasiliao
- Production locations: GMA Dagupan Broadcast Center, Dagupan City; GMA Ilocos Studios, San Vicente, Ilocos Sur (2022-23); GMA Ilocos Station II, Laoag (2023)
- Running time: 30 minutes
- Production companies: GMA Regional TV; GMA News

Original release
- Network: GMA 10 Dagupan; GMA 48 Ilocos Sur; GMA 5 Ilocos Norte
- Release: May 5, 2008 – present

One North Central Luzon (also known as GMA Regional TV One North Central Luzon; previously known as 24 Oras North Central Luzon, 24 Oras Amianan and Balitang Amianan) is a Philippine television news show of the GMA Regional TV in the North Central Luzon region. The newscast delivers news and current affairs in Filipino language. The news program is the first regional news program of GMA to be delivered in Filipino, and the first in Luzon. Initially created to deliver news from North Central Luzon, the newscast expanded its coverage into Ilocos Region, Cordillera Administrative Region, Cagayan Valley and parts of Central Luzon as part of GMA Regional TV's plans to strengthen its local news division. Originally anchored by Jorge Guerrero, it premiered on May 5, 2008. Cris Zuñiga currently serves as the main anchor.

The newscast airs from Monday to Friday from 5:10 PM to 5:40 PM on GMA Dagupan (TV-10), GMA TV-5 Ilocos Norte, GMA TV-48 Ilocos Sur, GMA TV-7 Abra, GMA TV-5 Mountain Province, GMA TV-7 Tuguegarao, GMA TV-13 Aparri, GMA TV-7 Isabela, GMA TV-5 Baler, GMA TV-7 Batanes and GMA TV-10 Olongapo. Also replay on DZSD-AM 1548 kHz Super Radyo Dagupan and DWBB-AM 1413 kHz Super Radyo Baguio via slightly delay basis at 6:00pm.

Balitang Amianan was also re-aired for national viewers under GTV's late night block "Local News Matters: GMA Regional TV Strip" on a weekly basis. It aired every Monday at 11:50 PM from May 18, 2020 to July 19, 2021.

The program also airs worldwide on GMA News TV.

== History ==
=== 2008-2014: As Balitang Amianan ===
It first aired on Channel 10 in Dagupan and anchored by former anchor for TV Patrol North Central Luzon/TV Patrol Ilocos (now TV Patrol North Luzon) and Dateline Northern Luzon (now defunct) Jorge Guerrero and the first set of news reporters namely Joyce Segui, CJ Torida, Alfie Tulagan and Charisse Victorio. In June 2012, Jorge Guerrero left the show and moved to GMA Ilocos to become the solo anchor of Balitang Ilokano (later 24 Oras Ilokano) and was replaced by CJ Torida. Co-anchor and reporter Joyce Segui joins Torida on the anchor team in 2013. The channel's biggest expose so far is about a casino which was established in Poro, San Fernando, La Union.

To strengthen its commitment of bringing the latest, most credible and most comprehensive news from the region, in July 2013, Balitang Amianan started its international broadcast on GMA News TV International alongside other newscasts Balitang Bisdak and 24 Oras Davao (now One Mindanao).

The newscast's first incarnation ended its 6-year run on November 7, 2014.

=== 2014-2015: As 24 Oras North Central Luzon ===
Following changes of its now-main newscast 24 Oras, Balitang Amianan was rebranded as 24 Oras North Central Luzon on November 10, 2014.

=== 2015-2016: As 24 Oras Amianan ===
On August 31, 2015, 24 Oras North Central Luzon retitled as 24 Oras Amianan (after Ratsada 24 Oras of GMA Iloilo since July 20, now relaunched since August 27, 2018 as One Western Visayas) with an additional segment called "Trivia ni Araguy". 24 Oras Amianan aired its last telecast on January 29, 2016.

=== 2016-2022: As GMA Regional TV Balitang Amianan ===
On February 1, 2016, GMA Regional TV Balitang Amianan returned on the air after more than a year hiatus. On April 18, 2016, Faye Centeno joined as Torida's co-anchor in the newscast.

On October 3, 2016, GMA Regional TV Balitang Amianan started its simulcast on GMA TV-5 Ilocos Norte, GMA TV-48 Ilocos Sur, GMA TV-7 Abra and GMA TV-5 Mountain Province as it expands its coverage area to the northern areas of the Ilocos Region and some parts of the Cordillera Administrative Region and Central Luzon (Balitang Amianan already broadcast in selected areas of Central Luzon [Tarlac, majority Tagalog-speaking provinces of Nueva Ecija and Zambales, and selected areas of Pampanga, Bulacan, and Aurora in particular] in the beginning of news program, which is the reason for using the Filipino language as its medium); Central Luzon is a multicultural & multilingual region, with Tagalog/Filipino serving as a regional lingua franca & Ilocano as a main lingua franca in the northern areas of the region.

On January 1, 2017, the newscast updated its opening billboard and lower third graphics similar to 24 Oras, together with other newscasts GMA Regional TV Balitang Bisdak and GMA Regional TV One Mindanao.

==== Relaunch ====
On October 23, 2017, Balitang Amianan relaunched with a brand new set and segments (including the well-known Anto Tan?), as well as theme music and OBB, similar to its sister regional news program One Mindanao, GMA Regional TV's newscast for Mindanao stations, which was launched two months earlier. Longtime correspondent Joanne Ponsoy joined Torida and Centeno to anchor the newscast.

In July 2018, longtime reporter Jasmin Gabriel-Galban joined Torida and Ponsoy on the anchor team. She replaced Faye Centeno, who left the newscast.

On May 6, 2019, the newscast tweaks a minor revision of its titlecard, changing its font color to green, reflecting it with its co-produced national newscast GMA Regional TV Weekend News (later Regional TV Weekend News, now Regional TV News), which was launched on May 11. A week after, on August 5, 2019, Balitang Amianan updated their graphics and introduced new opening titles patterned with its co-produced national newscast (featuring the sceneries of the program's coverage area). The newscast had a more relaxed set-up with couches instead of the tables and chairs that viewers usually see on typical newscasts intending to be an extension of viewers' living room, further connecting the news anchors and the viewers.

On March 15, 2021, Balitang Amianan expands its simulcast on GMA TV-7 Tuguegarao, GMA TV-13 Aparri, GMA TV-7 Isabela, GMA TV-5 Baler, GMA TV-7 Batanes, and GMA TV-10 Olongapo as it expands its coverage area to Batanes, Cagayan, Isabela, Nueva Vizcaya, Quirino, and other majority native Tagalog-speaking provinces of Aurora and Zambales; Balitang Amianan already aired in selected areas of Aurora, Nueva Vizcaya, & Zambales at the start of the news program, as those areas were reached by the airwaves of GMA-10 Dagupan. GMA Tuguegarao, GMA Aparri, GMA Isabela, GMA Baler, GMA TV-7 Batanes, and GMA Olongapo were former relay stations of GMA-7 Manila before being reassigned to GMA Dagupan on March 15, 2021. Three months later, on June 14, 2021, Balitang Amianan updated its opening billboard to reflect the addition of Cagayan Valley and the rest of Cordillera and Central Luzon (except for Bataan and Bulacan) to its coverage area.

From September 20 to November 21, 2021, Torida temporarily left the newscast while Gabriel-Galban returned to being a field reporter, leaving Ponsoy as a solo anchor until Torida returned. Co-anchor and Mornings with GMA Regional TV host Harold Reyes replaced Gabriel-Galban in the anchor team from February 25, 2022 to June 30, 2023, once again reviving the three-anchor format for the newscast and three other regional newscasts.

The newscast started using the newly opened studio of the GMA Ilocos Sur Station on April 25, while in tandem also using the studio of the GMA Dagupan Station. Co-anchor-correspondent Ivy Hernando joined the anchor team on June 12, 2022.

=== 2022-Present: As GMA Regional TV One North Central Luzon ===
On September 5, 2022, the newscast was rebranded to "GMA Regional TV One North Central Luzon" as part of the newscast expanding its coverage to other Tagalog-speaking provinces of Bataan and Bulacan, being the third newscast to use the ONE brand, alongside One Mindanao from GMA Davao, GMA Cagayan de Oro, GMA Zamboanga and GMA General Santos and One Western Visayas from GMA Bacolod and GMA Iloilo.

Less than a year after the relaunch, the program started using the studio of the GMA Ilocos Norte Station on March 6, 2023. Co-anchor Breves Bulsao from PTV Cordillera joined the anchor team on May 28, 2023, making the newscast the first among other GMA Regional TV programs to adopt the 5-anchor format.

Anchor and former TV Patrol North Central Luzon (later TV Patrol North Luzon) anchor and correspondent Cris Zuñiga solely took over the newscast on July 30, 2023. Torida and Ponsoy had their last appearance as anchors the day before, transferring to the morning newscast Mornings with GMA Regional TV; this ended the hosting of CJ Torida of the news program for 11 years. Harold Reyes and Breves Bulsao left the network while Ivy Hernando returned to being a field reporter. Zuñiga made his first national appearance in Regional TV News on July 31, 2023.

On August 30, 2024, Ponsoy, Hernando, Gab de Luna, and Russel Simorio marked their final appearance.

On May 12, 2025, the OBB changed, and Al Torres officially retired and was replaced by Weng dela Peña.

On September 29, 2025, the news program became available via livestream on GMA Regional TV's social media accounts, alongside Balitang Bisdak, One Western Visayas, and One Mindanao.

However, on June 29, 2026, to conform with the newest regional newscast, Ratsada Balita, the second-to-last words of GMA Regional TV newscasts, including One North Central Luzon, is changed to red, signaling the end of the integrated era. Likewise, the GMA News intro is used.

== Area of coverage ==
- Through GMA TV-10 (DZEA):
  - Portion of Benguet (including Baguio City)
  - Portion of Ilocos Sur
  - Portion of La Union
  - Pangasinan
  - Portion of Bulacan
  - Nueva Ecija
  - Portion of Pampanga
  - Tarlac
- Through GMA TV-5 (D-5-AS):
  - Portion of Ilocos Norte
- Through GMA TV-48 (DWBC):
  - Portion of Abra
  - Portion of Ilocos Sur
- Through GMA TV-7 (D-7-ZG):
  - Portion of Abra
- Through GMA TV-7 (DWAZ):
  - Basco, Batanes
- Through GMA TV-13 (DZBB):
  - Aparri, Cagayan
- Through GMA TV-7 (DWBB):
  - Tuguegarao
- Through GMA TV-5 (DZVG):
  - Portions of:
    - Ifugao
    - Kalinga (Tabuk)
    - Mountain Province
    - Cagayan
    - Isabela
    - Quirino
    - Nueva Vizcaya
- Through GMA TV-7 (DWLE):
  - Santiago City, Isabela and surrounding areas
- Through GMA TV-5 (D-5-ZB):
  - Baler, Aurora and surrounding areas
- Through GMA TV-10 (DWNS):
  - Olongapo City and surrounding areas

== Personalities ==
=== Main anchor ===
- Cris Zuñiga (Main anchor; since 2023)

=== Main correspondents ===
- CJ Torida (Senior Desk Editor and fill-in anchor for Zuñiga)
- Glam Calicdan-Dizon (Senior Program Manager)
- Jasmin Gabriel-Galban (Dagupan correspondent)
- Jewel May Fernandez (Supervising Producer)
- Sendee Salvacio (News Producer)

=== Former personalities ===
- Jorge Guerrero (Main anchor; 2008-12)
- Joyce Segui (Co-anchor, 2008-15)
- Joanne Ponsoy (Dagupan anchor and correspondent; 2011-24)
- Ivy Hernando (Ilocos Sur Co-anchor and correspondent; 2016-24)
- Faye Centeno (Dagupan Co-anchor; 2016-18)
- Breves Bulsao (Ilocos Norte Co-anchor; 2023)
- Harold Reyes (Dagupan Co-anchor; 2022-23)
- Jessica Manwi-it^{†}
- Charmaine Alvarado
- Lilian Bautista-Tiburcio
- Mike Sabado
- Hazel Cawaing-Alviar
- Jeeson Alamar
- Peha Lagao
- Charisse Victorio
- Shiela Mae Finuliar
- Anthony Ron Allister "Ka Tonying" Tañedo a.k.a. Araguy (Trivia ni Araguy segment presenter)
- Michael Sison
- Jette Arcellana
- Alfie Tulagan
- Kim Bandarlipe (Regional correspondent)
- King Guevarra (Regional correspondent)
- Maureen Dalope-Galapon
- Marjorie Padua (correspondent)
- Dennis Alipio (Ilocos Norte correspondent)
- Vic Alhambra (La Union correspondent)
- Junjun Sy (Nueva Ecija correspondent)
- Ronald Leander (Aurora correspondent)
- Tere Sundayon (Ilocos Sur correspondent)
- Trace Justine De Leon (correspondent)
- Russel Simorio (Dagupan correspondent, 2017-24)
- Gab De Luna (Ilocos Norte correspondent)
- Claire Lacanilao-Dungca (Dagupan correspondent)
- Jerick James Pasiliao
- Roland Umangay (Senior Desk Editor)

== Segments ==
- Blotter (Police Reports)
- Health Alert (Health Reports)
- Magkano? (Price Reports)
- May Trabaho Ka! (Job Reports)
- Hayop sa Balita (Animal Reports)
- Huli Cam (Caught-on-Cam Reports)
- Laban Kontra Droga (Drug Reports)
- GMA Integrated News Weather Center (Weather Reports)
- Balitang Barangay (Neighborhood Reports)
- Dengue Watch (Dengue Reports)
- Balitang Sports / Game On! (Sports Reports)
- Balitang Showbiz (Showbiz Reports)
- Extra (Features)
- Extra Income (Money Reports)
- Good News (Good Features)
- Campus News (Campus Reports)
- Kapuso Serbisyo (Public Service Reports)
- Kapuso Barangayan (Event Reports)
- Batang North Central Luzon (Children Reports)
- GMA Regional TV Interviews (Interviews)
- GMA Regional TV Presents (Special Reports)
- #SpreadKindness (Profile Reports)
- Trip Natin/G na G! (Travel Reports)
- Kwento ng Pilipino (Story Reports)
- Anto Tan? (Questions)
- Mangan! (Food Reports)
- 'Yan ang Pinoy! (Talented Reports)
- Balitang Agri (Agri Reports)
- Fiesta! (Fiesta Reports)
- Ratsada Balita/Ratsada Probinsiya (Other Reports)
- Ipa-ONCL Mo! (Problem Reports)
- Exclusive (Exclusive Reports)
- Hanepbuhay (Work Reports)
- Kapuso sa Kalikasan (Environmental Reports)
- Kapuso sa Pasko (Christmas Activity Feature Segment)
