= Isyu Ngayon =

Filipino regional TV news magazines

- Isyu Ngayon Promotional Poster (2010)
- Also known as: Isyu Karon (Cebu, Cagayan de Oro, Davao, and General Santos); Isyu Subong (Iloilo and Bacolod); Isyu Ngonian (Naga)
- Genre: News broadcasting; Live action; Magazine; Public affairs; Documentary
- Created by: GMA Regional TV
- Developed by: GMA Regional News and Public Affairs
- Presented by: Alfie Tulagan (Dagupan); Elmer Caseles (Naga); Fabienne Paderes (Iloilo); Enrico Surita Jr. (Iloilo); Gretchen Varela-Ochoa (Bacolod); Lou-Anne Mae Rondina (Cebu); Sylvia Aguhob (Cagayan de Oro); John Paul Seniel (Davao); Helen Quiñanola (Davao); Jennifer Solis (General Santos)
- Country of origin: Philippines
- Original languages: Tagalog/Filipino (Dagupan); Cebuano (Cebu, Davao, Cagayan de Oro and General Santos); Bicolano (Naga); Hiligaynon (Iloilo and Bacolod)

Production
- Executive producers: Marissa L. Flores; Luz Annalee O. Escudero-Catibog
- Running time: 60 minutes, weekly (Dagupan, Iloilo, Cebu and Davao); 30-45 minutes, daily (Naga, Bacolod, Cagayan de Oro and General Santos)

Original release
- Network: GMA Network
- Release: October 30, 2010 – April 24, 2015

The Isyu Ngayon series (Issues Today) was a brand of regional news magazine shows of different GMA Regional TV stations in the Philippines. They were aired weekly in Dagupan, Cebu, Iloilo and Davao on Saturday mornings; and aired daily in Naga, Bacolod, Cagayan de Oro and General Santos. The Isyu Ngayon family of programs was not available in the Metro Manila market. Its editions in Naga, Iloilo, Bacolod and Davao were aired internationally via GMA News TV International.

== History ==
Isyu Ngayon premiered on October 30, 2010, as a Saturday morning news magazine program replacing the Agenda series on GMA Regional TV in Dagupan, Cebu, Iloilo, and Davao. The show featured forums and documentaries focused on the 2010 national and local elections and was modeled after US Sunday morning talk shows, addressing political and human interest stories. It served as the network's response to Mag TV Na. On November 22, 2010, Isyu Ngayon expanded to a daily news magazine format following the launch of regional news teams in Naga, Bacolod, Cagayan de Oro, and General Santos, competing with local editions of TV Patrol.

Despite strong ratings, the Isyu Ngayon editions in Dagupan, Cebu, Iloilo, and General Santos were cancelled between late 2011 and early 2012. The three weekly editions were replaced by the Sunday travel show Let's Fiesta, while the General Santos station was absorbed by the Davao station, with Flash Bulletin as its sole locally produced program. Despite these cancellations, Isyu Ngayon continued airing in other regions.

As part of GMA's expansion of Serbisyong Totoo and the growing success in the provinces, two Isyu Ngayon editions were transformed into live newscasts. On September 14, 2012, the Naga edition ended and was replaced by Baretang Bikol, GMA Bicol's flagship newscast, which later became 24 Oras Bikol. On February 4, 2013, the Cagayan de Oro edition was replaced by Testigo Northern Mindanao, which evolved into 24 Oras Northern Mindanao following the launch of the GMA Northern Mindanao originating station.

On October 13, 2012, Isyu Mindanao was launched to consolidate the Cagayan de Oro, Davao and General Santos editions. It was later replaced by Isyu ug Istorya on July 19, 2014.

The Bacolod edition, the only daily Isyu Ngayon edition, aired alongside Ratsada from GMA Iloilo before it was discontinued. It became GMA Bacolod's flagship news program, taped on location except for live coverage of local events. Unlike other regional newscasts, it was not rebranded under 24 Oras. The final episode aired on April 24, 2015, following GMA's strategic streamlining of regional operations, which included layoffs, cancellations of other morning and afternoon programs, and the closure of regional news departments in Ilocos, Bicol, and Northern Mindanao. The Iloilo news department was closed in November of the same year.

== Segments ==
- Nangungunang Isyu - Feature stories on the region's biggest ongoing events, including interviews with the top local newsmakers.
- Developing Story - Features ongoing issues affecting the majority, such as livelihood, the environment, politics, and the economy.
- Sari Sari - Features on local attractions, food, handicrafts, travel, and significant community events..
- In na In - Features on technological breakthroughs, trends, and fashion.
- Anong Isyu Mo? - Man-on-the-street interviews covering topics like price hikes, contraceptive use, service activities, and more.

== List of Isyu Ngayon Editions (final composition) ==
=== Aired in weekly basis ===
- North Central Luzon Isyu Ngayon (GMA Dagupan)

Delivered in Filipino - Hosted by Alfie Tulagan.

- Central Visayas Isyu Karon (GMA Cebu)

Delivered in Cebuano - Hosted by Lou-Anne Mae Rondina.

- Ilonggo Isyu Subong (GMA Iloilo)

Delivered in Hiligaynon - Hosted by Fabienne Paderes and Enrico Surita Jr.

- Isyu Mindanao (GMA Cagayan de Oro, GMA Davao and GMA General Santos)

Delivered in Cebuano - Hosted by John Paul Seniel and Jennifer Solis.

=== Aired in daily basis ===
- Negrense Isyu Subong (GMA Bacolod)

Delivered in Hiligaynon - Hosted by Gretchen Varela-Ochoa.

=== Previous regional versions ===
- Bicolandia Isyu Ngonian (GMA Bicol)

Delivered in Bicolano - Hosted by Elmer Caseles.

- Northern Mindanao Isyu Karon (GMA Cagayan de Oro) (fused into Isyu Mindanao)

Delivered in Cebuano - Hosted by Sylvia Aguhob.

- Southern Mindanao Isyu Karon (GMA Davao) (fused into Isyu Mindanao)

Delivered in Cebuano - Hosted by John Paul Seniel and Helen Quiñanola.

- Socsksargen Isyu Karon (GMA General Santos) (fused into Isyu Mindanao)

Delivered in Cebuano - Hosted by Jennifer Solis.

== Isyu Ngayon Areas ==
=== Luzon ===
North Central Luzon Isyu Ngayon

- Dagupan (station-produced)
- Baguio
- Mountain Province
- Olongapo
- Baler, Aurora

Bicolandia Isyu Ngonian

- Naga (station-produced)
- Legazpi
- Sorsogon
- Masbate
- Virac

=== Visayas ===
Ilonggo Isyu Subong

- Kalibo
- Roxas
- Iloilo (station-produced)

Negrense Isyu Subong

- Bacolod (station-produced)
- Murcia, Negros Occidental

Central Visayas Isyu Karon

- Dumaguete
- Cebu (station-produced)
- Bohol
- Tacloban
- Ormoc
- Calbayog
- Borongan

=== Mindanao ===
Northern Mindanao Isyu Karon

- Iligan
- Ozamiz
- Cagayan de Oro (station-produced)
- Bukidnon
- Dipolog
- Pagadian

Southern Mindanao Isyu Karon

- Davao (station-produced)

Socsksargen Isyu Karon

- General Santos (station-produced)
- Kidapawan
- Cotabato

Note: Isyu Mindanao, the successor of the three Isyu Ngayon Mindanao editions, was produced by GMA Davao.
