= Regional TV Weekend News =

Philippine television show

- Title card
- Also known as: GMA Regional TV Weekend News
- Genre: News broadcasting
- Country of origin: Philippines
- Original languages: English (July 27, 2019 – September 5, 2020); Tagalog (September 12, 2020 – July 24, 2021)

Production
- Executive producer: Oliver Victor B. Amoroso
- Camera setup: Multiple-camera setup
- Running time: 60 minutes
- Production companies: GMA Regional TV; GMA News and Public Affairs

Original release
- Network: GMA News TV (2019–21); GMA Network (2020); GTV (2021)
- Release: July 27, 2019 – July 24, 2021

Regional TV Weekend News is a Philippine television news broadcasting show broadcast by GMA News TV, GMA Network and GTV. It premiered on July 27, 2019, on GMA News TV and on March 21, 2020, on GMA Network. The show concluded on GMA Network on May 2, 2020. The show concluded on GTV on July 24, 2021.

== History ==
GMA Regional TV Weekend News launched on July 27, 2019, on GMA News TV, making history as the first regional English-language newscast to be aired nationally. It began with Balitang Bisdak (GMA Cebu) for the Central and Eastern Visayas, anchored by Lou Anne Mae Rondina, Alan Domingo, and Cecille Quibod-Castro. On August 3, 2019, Balitang Amianan (GMA Dagupan) launched in Filipino for North Central Luzon, with Jasmin Gabriel-Galban, CJ Torida, and Joanne Ponsoy as anchors. One Western Visayas (GMA Iloilo), a pioneering Hiligaynon newscast, followed on August 10, 2019, anchored by Adrian Prietos, Kaitlene Rivilla, and Zen Quilantang (later replaced by Atty. Sedfrey Cabaluna). On August 17, 2019, One Mindanao (GMA Davao) premiered for Mindanao, anchored by Tek Ocampo, Sarah Hilomen-Velasco, and Real Sorroche.

Due to the COVID-19 pandemic, the program temporarily moved to GMA Network from March 21 to May 2, 2020, airing at 10:35 PM. It returned to GMA News TV on May 9, 2020, with a new timeslot of 7:00 to 7:45 PM.

On July 4, 2020, during the ECQ in Metro Cebu, GMA Iloilo's One Western Visayas anchors Atty. Sedfrey Cabaluna and Kaitlene Rivilla temporarily replaced the Balitang Bisdak team. On August 15, 2020, the newscasts transitioned to a stand-up delivery mode, which was adopted by all regional newscasts.

On September 5, 2020, the program aired its final English-language broadcast. The following week, the newscast switched to Tagalog, with subsequent timeslot changes: from 5:30 to 6:30 PM (September 19–October 31) and 10:30 to 11:30 PM starting November 7, 2020.

The October 31, 2020 episode, GMA Regional TV Presents: Kwento ng Kababalaghan, explored spooky stories. On November 14, 2020, the newscast covered the aftermath of Typhoon Vamco (Ulysses) in Cagayan Valley, Central Luzon, and Bicol.

On February 27, 2021, the show was rebranded as Regional TV Weekend News following the transition of GMA News TV to GTV. The first broadcast from GMA Bicol aired on March 6, 2021. On March 20, 2021, Nikko Sereno filled in for Alan Domingo during his absence, and Jandi Esteban substituted for Real Sorroche in July 2021.

By July 16, 2021, GMA Regional TV dropped the regional newscast bumpers for all segments, leading into Regional TV Weekend News. On July 26, 2021, the program shifted to a weekday format, airing Monday to Friday at 10:00 AM before Slam Dunk, and Saturdays at 10:00 AM before OMJ: Oh My Job. The program celebrated the second anniversary of GMA Regional TV's #LocalNewsMatters campaign.

== Overview ==
The newscasts primarily covers weekly updates from Luzon, Visayas and Mindanao through its regional news bureaus in North Central Luzon (Dagupan and Ilocos, served by Balitang Amianan), Southern Luzon (Naga, served by Balitang Bicolandia), Western Visayas (Iloilo and Bacolod, served by One Western Visayas), Central and Eastern Visayas (Cebu, served by Balitang Bisdak) and Mindanao (Davao and Cagayan de Oro, served by One Mindanao).

Originally delivered in English since launch, the newscast decided already delivery to Tagalog since September 12, 2020 until present.

With the rebranding of GMA News TV to GTV on February 22, 2021, GMA Regional TV Weekend News dropped the "GMA" corporate name from its title five days later on February 27. But it is still refer as GMA Regional TV Weekend News as its primary name.

The March 6 episode marked the first time the anchors of Balitang Bicolandia host the newscast. And along with that, a refurbishing of their opening billboard.

The program concluded as a newscast on May 31, 2024. as Regional TV News is fused as a segment on Balitanghali.

=== Dagupan Bureau (North Central Luzon) ===
- Pangasinan
  - Dagupan
- Tarlac
  - Tarlac City
- Nueva Ecija
  - Cabanatuan
- Zambales
  - Olongapo
- Bataan
  - Balanga
- Aurora
  - Baler
- Bulacan
  - Malolos
- Benguet
  - Baguio
- Mountain Province
  - Sagada
- Ifugao
  - Banaue
- La Union
  - San Fernando City
- Ilocos Norte
  - Laoag
- Abra
  - Bangued
- Ilocos Sur
  - Vigan
- Pampanga
  - San Fernando City
- Batanes
  - Basco
- Cagayan
  - Tuguegarao
- Isabela
  - Santiago City
- Nueva Vizcaya
  - Bayombong

=== Naga Bureau (Southern Luzon) ===
- Camarines Norte
  - Daet
- Camarines Sur
  - Naga
- Catanduanes
  - Virac
- Albay
  - Legazpi
- Sorsogon
  - Sorsogon City
- Masbate
  - Masbate City

=== Iloilo Bureau (Western Visayas) ===
- Aklan
  - Kalibo
- Antique
  - San Jose de Buenavista
- Capiz
  - Roxas
- Iloilo
  - Iloilo City
- Guimaras
  - Jordan
- Negros Occidental
  - Bacolod

=== Cebu Bureau (Central and Eastern Visayas) ===
- Metro Cebu
- Cebu
  - Cebu City
- Bohol
  - Tagbilaran
- Negros Oriental
  - Dumaguete
- Siquijor
  - Siquior
- Leyte
  - Tacloban
- Southern Leyte
  - Maasin
- Northern Samar
  - Catarman
- Samar
  - Calbayog
- Eastern Samar
  - Borongan
- Biliran
  - Naval

=== Davao Bureau (Northern, South Central and Southern Mindanao) ===
- Metro Davao
- Davao del Sur
  - Davao City
- Davao del Norte
  - Tagum
- Davao Oriental
  - Mati
- Davao Occidental
  - Malita
- Davao de Oro
  - Nabunturan
- General Santos
- Sarangani
  - Alabel
- Sultan Kudarat
  - Tacurong
- South Cotabato
  - Koronadal
- Maguindanao
  - Cotabato City
- Cotabato
  - Kidapawan
- Misamis Oriental
  - Cagayan de Oro
- Misamis Occidental
  - Ozamiz
- Lanao del Norte
  - Iligan
- Lanao del Sur
  - Marawi
- Bukidnon
  - Malaybalay
- Zamboanga del Norte
  - Dipolog
- Zamboanga del Sur
  - Pagadian
- Camiguin
  - Mambajao
- Agusan del Norte
  - Butuan
- Surigao del Norte
  - Surigao City
- Agusan del Sur
  - Bayugan
- Surigao del Sur
  - Tandag
- Dinagat Islands
  - San Jose
- Zamboanga Sibugay
  - Ipil
- Zamboanga City
- Basilan
  - Isabela
- Sulu
  - Jolo
- Tawi-Tawi
  - Bongao

== Final anchors ==
From GMA Regional TV-Balitang Amianan of GMA Dagupan

- CJ Torida
- Jasmin Gabriel-Galban
- Joanne Ponsoy

Broadcast Location
GMA Dagupan Station, Claveria Road, Malued District, Dagupan, Pangasinan.

From GMA Regional TV-Balitang Bicolandia of GMA Bicol

- Jessie Cruzat
- Rhayne Palino
- Katherine Henry

Broadcast Location
GMA Broadcast Complex, Concepcion Pequena, Naga, Camarines Sur.

From GMA Regional TV-One Western Visayas of GMA Iloilo

- Atty. Sedfrey Cabaluna
- Kaitlene Rivilla

Broadcast Location
GMA Iloilo Station, Phase 5, Alta Tierra Village, MacArthur Drive, Barangay Quintin Salas, Jaro, Iloilo City.

From GMA Regional TV-Balitang Bisdak of GMA Cebu

- Lou-Anne Mae Rondina
- Alan Domingo
- Cecille Quibod-Castro

Broadcast Location
GMA Skyview Complex, Nivel Hills, Apas, Cebu City.

From GMA Regional TV-One Mindanao of GMA Davao

- Tek Ocampo
- Sarah Hilomen-Velasco
- Jandi Esteban

Broadcast Location
GMA Davao Station, Broadcast Ave., Shrine Hills, Matina, Davao City.

== Final correspondents ==
North Central Luzon

- Ivy Hernando (Ilocos Sur)
- Joanne Ponsoy (Dagupan)
- Jasmin Gabriel-Galban (Dagupan)
- King Guevarra (Dagupan)
- Claire Lacanilao (Dagupan)
- Russel Simorio (Dagupan)

Bicol Region

- Rhayne Palino (Naga)
- Charm Ragiles (Naga)
- Katherine Henry (Naga)

Western Visayas

- Zen Quilantang (Iloilo)
- Darylle Marie Sarmiento (Iloilo)
- John Sala (Iloilo)
- Adrian Prietos (Bacolod)

Central & Eastern Visayas

- Alan Domingo (Cebu)
- Lou-Anne Mae Rondina (Cebu)
- Nikko Sereno (Cebu)
- Fe Marie Dumaboc (Cebu)

Northern, South Central & Southern Mindanao

- Cyril Chaves (Cagayan de Oro)
- Sheillah Vergara-Rubio (Davao)
- Rgil Relator (Davao)
- Jandi Esteban (Davao)
- Real Sorroche (Davao)

Former anchor

- Real Sorroche (Davao)

Former correspondents

- Clyde Macascas (Cagayan de Oro)
- Ethel Ipanag (Cagayan de Oro)
- Chona Carreon (Cebu)
- Lian Sinculan (Cebu)
- Kim Bandarlipe (Dagupan)

== Accolades ==
Accolades received by Regional TV Weekend News
Year	Award	Category	Recipient	Result	Ref.
2020	42nd Catholic Mass Media Awards	Special Citation: News Program	"April 4, 2020"	Won	
