= DWDG-TV =

GTV-22 Benguet (Baguio) (DWDG-TV)
- "Keeping it Good"
- Tuba, Benguet; Philippines
- Channels: Analog: 22 (UHF); Digital: DZEA-TV 38 (UHF, ISDB-T) Virtual: 10.02
- Branding: GTV-22 Benguet (Baguio); GTV-22 North Central Luzon

Programming
- Affiliations: GTV

Ownership
- Owner: GMA Network, Inc.
- Sister stations: GMA TV-10 North Central Luzon; Barangay FM 92.7 Baguio; GMA Super Radyo DZSD 1548 Dagupan; Barangay FM 93.5 Dagupan

History
- Founded: 1995
- Former channel number: 24 (1995–2015)
- Former affiliations: Citynet Television (1995–1999); Entertainment Music Channel (1999); STAR TV through Channel [V] Philippines (1999–2001); Silent (2001–2005); QTV/Q (2005–2011) GMA News TV (2011-2021)
- Call sign meaning: DW; DaGupan

Technical information
- Licensing authority: NTC
- Power: 10 kW
- ERP: 120 kW

Links
- Website: GTV

DWDG-TV (channel 22) is a television station in Tuba, Benguet, Philippines, airing programming from the GTV network. It is owned and operated by GMA Network, Inc. alongside GMA outlet DZEA-TV (channel 10). Its hybrid transmitting facilities atop Mount Santo Tomas.

Although identifying as a separate station in its own right, DWDG-TV is considered a straight simulcast of GTV's flagship station, DWDB-TV (channel 27) in Metro Manila.

== History ==
=== As Citynet Television and EMC / Channel [V] Philippines ===
In 1995, GMA Network launched its UHF TV station in Benguet under the branding Citynet Television 24 (or just Citynet 24). As started its operations, the station was programmed like an independent station—GMA intended Citynet 27 to be its main outlet for imported programming (particularly from the United States), freeing up slots in GMA Network's schedule for more domestic productions. By 1999, the costs of operating the station in this format were becoming too high for GMA. The station was turned into a music channel under the interim branding EMC, the Entertainment Music Channel—which was also the country's first locally operated music channel. A few months later by December 19, 1999, GMA reached a deal with Asian broadcaster STAR TV to allow this channel to be a carrier of Channel V Philippines and it had already aired selected Channel V programming from its international version. This arrangement did not last long—a stake in GMA was recently purchased by the Philippine Long Distance Telephone Company, who already owned MTV Philippines through the Nation Broadcasting Corporation and its parent company MediaQuest Holdings. This conflict of interest, along with the increasing competition from the MTV affiliated network, led to the channel signing-off on July 25, 2001.

=== As QTV/Q, GMA News TV and moved to Channel 22 ===
After four years of silence in Benguet, on November 11, 2005, the station returned its operations. DWDG-TV, together with other GMA's sister UHF stations nationwide, were launched as an all-female lifestyle channel QTV (standing for Quality Television; later renamed as simply Q in March 2007). With the return of its TV operations, its flagship station in Metro Manila was DZOE-TV—which GMA lease as part of a partnership with the religious broadcaster ZOE Broadcasting Network (gaining control of the station in exchange for providing equipment for ZOE, and allowing airtime for ZOE-produced programming on QTV), with the GMA-owned flagship station in Manila serving as a UHF translator (GMA had previously operated as the independent station Citynet 27, before it went silent in the middle of 2001). The new network would feature a lineup predominantly aimed towards women, with a mixture of domestic and imported lifestyle programs and dramatic series. On February 7, 2011, GMA Network announced that it would replace Q with the news channel GMA News TV. As Q's programming ended on February 20; the network, broadcasting under transitional branding Channel 11 (along with other stations nationwide), continued to air teasers for the impending re-launch from February 21–25, and signed off completely on the 26th and 27th of the same month in preparation for its re-launch of a secondary network a day later. On February 28, 2011, DWDG-TV and other GMA's sister UHF stations nationwide were reformatted and formal re-launch as news and public affairs channel GMA News TV, and as part of GMA News and Public Affairs's plans to expand its presence on free-to-air television. And in 2015, GMA News TV Benguet was transferred its channel assignment to Channel 22.

=== As GTV ===
On February 9, 2021, GMA Network announced that GMA News TV will officially rebrand to GTV on February 22, 2021, as the new news, entertainment and sports channel (similarly to its old Citynet format in 1995).

== Digital television ==
=== Digital channels ===
DWDG-TV's feed is broadcast on DZEA-TV digital subchannel operates on UHF channel 38 (617.143 MHz) and broadcasts on the following subchannels:

Channel	Video	Aspect	Short name	Programming	Note	
10.01	480i	16:9	GMA	GMA Dagupan (Main DZEA-TV programming)	Commercial broadcast (15 kW)	
10.02	480i	16:9	GTV	GTV Dagupan (Main DWDG-TV programming)	Commercial broadcast (15 kW)	
10.03	480i	16:9	HEART OF ASIA	Heart of Asia	Commercial broadcast (15 kW)	
10.06	480i	16:9	HALLYPOP	Hallypop	Commercial broadcast (15 kW)	
10.07	480i	16:9	I HEART MOVIES	I Heart Movies	Commercial broadcast (15 kW)	
10.08	480i	16:9	PINOY HITS	Pinoy Hits	Commercial broadcast (15 kW)	
10.11	480i	16:9	(UNNAMED)	Unknown	Black screen	
10.31	240p	16:9	GMA 1Seg	GMA Dagupan (relay station of DZBB-TV Manila)	Commercial broadcast (15 kW)	1seg broadcast

== Areas of coverage ==
=== Primary Areas ===
- Benguet (including Baguio City)
- La Union
- Pangasinan

=== Secondary Areas ===
- Portion of Ilocos Sur
- Portion of Tarlac
- Portion of Nueva Ecija

== See also ==
- GTV
- List of GTV stations
