= DZEA-TV =

Television station in Dagupan, Philippines

- Tuba, Benguet; Philippines
- City: Dagupan, Pangasinan
- Channels: Analog: 10 (VHF); Digital: 38 (UHF) (ISDB-T); Virtual: 10
- Branding: GMA TV-10 Dagupan; GMA TV-10 Benguet; GMA North Central Luzon

Programming
- Subchannels: See list

Ownership
- Owner: GMA Network Inc.
- Sister stations: DWDG-TV (GTV); Super Radyo DZSD 1548 Dagupan; Barangay LS 92.7 Baguio; Barangay LS 93.5 Dagupan

History
- Founded: 1966 (under ABS-CBN); March 1, 1977 (under GMA Network)
- Former call signs: DZRI-TV (1966–1972); DWMJ-TV (1977–1980)
- Former channel numbers: Analog: 6 (VHF, 1966–1967)
- Former affiliations: ABS-CBN (1966–1972)

Technical information
- Licensing authority: NTC
- Power: Analog: 20 kW; Digital: 15 kW
- ERP: Analog: 120 kW; Digital: 90 kW
- Transmitter coordinates: 16°20′07″N 120°33′40″E
- Translator(s): (see article)

Links
- Website: GMANetwork.com

DZEA-TV (channel 10) is a television station in North Central Luzon, Philippines, airing programming from the GMA network. It is owned and operated by the network's namesake corporate parent. Its studios are located at the GMA Complex, Claveria Road, Malued District, Dagupan, Pangasinan, while its hybrid analog and digital transmitter facilities shared with GTV outlet DWDG-TV (channel 22) are located atop Mount Santo Tomas, Tuba, Benguet, and its SFN relay tower at Luz Street, Brgy. Dionisio Garcia, Cabanatuan, Nueva Ecija.

== History ==
=== Early years; Martial Law era (1966–1972) ===
The station began operations in 1966 as DZRI-TV in Dagupan, the first television station in Northern Luzon. DZRI-TV was launched upon the establishment of ABS-CBN's predecessor Alto Broadcasting System. The station began on VHF channel 6 with a transmitting power of 500 watts.

In November 1967, the station migrated to Mt. Sto Tomas in Benguet and changed frequency to the current Channel 10. ABS-CBN would eventually return to operating within Dagupan with DZRR-TV on the Channel 3 frequency (then on UHF Channel 32).

In 1969, Channel 10 broadcast the Seven Last Words from the Baguio Cathedral to viewers in Metro Manila and Pangasinan via microwave relay. This method was done prior to the introduction of the nationwide satellite broadcast system. The first ever broadcast of this kind, it made ABS-CBN the pioneer in nationwide broadcasting.

Following the declaration of Martial Law by President Ferdinand Marcos, which forced ABS-CBN to shut down under his crony, Roberto Benedicto, DZRI-TV ceased broadcasting in September 1972.

ABS-CBN would return to the airwaves in Baguio City on August 29, 1988; two years after the fall of Marcos with the People Power revolution in September 1986, albeit with different callsign and frequency, D-3-ZO-TV Channel 3.

=== Relaunched of GMA Network (1977–present) ===
On March 1, 1977, Channel 10 was relaunched under GMA Network's predecessor Republic Broadcasting System with the call letters DWMJ-TV, later renamed to the current DZEA-TV callsign in 1980. The station featured its own version of the GMA Radio-Television Arts ident, initially with a light blue square logo and white text, later adopting a circle 10 logo. In its final years, the logo resembled those used by ABC affiliates in some U.S. cities and eventually incorporated rainbow-colored stripes in red, yellow, green, and blue.

On April 30, 1992, following the launch of the Rainbow Satellite Network, GMA Channel 10 Baguio began nationwide satellite broadcasts, delivering Manila-based programming from flagship station DZBB-TV to viewers in Northern Luzon.

In 2005, GMA Network launched Channel 10 as a satellite station in Dagupan, Pangasinan, opening studios in Claveria Road at Malued District, and inaugurating a 20,000-watt transmitter on Mount Sto. Tomas, Benguet, significantly improving signal quality across Northern and Central Luzon. That same year, QTV Channel 38 was also launched in Dagupan (now inactive).

In 2008, GMA Dagupan was upgraded to an originating station and rebranded as GMA North Central Luzon, primarily serving parts of Northern and Central Luzon, mainly Benguet, and Pangasinan. On May 5 of the same year, it launched its flagship local newscast Balitang Amianan, which later relaunched as One North Central Luzon on September 5, 2022, and had already gained its audience within six months, according to AGB Nielsen Philippines. On April 24, 2015, GMA layoffs 200 employees as part of GMA Network's strategic streamlining of its provincial stations.

In May 2018, GMA North Central Luzon began digital test broadcasts on UHF Channel 38. In July 2023, GMA North Central Luzon among the network's originating stations in the Philippines (outside GMA Manila) upgrades to its 16:9 widescreen format.

== GMA TV-10 Dagupan programs ==
- One North Central Luzon
- Panagbenga Festival
- Word of God Network

== GMA TV-10 Dagupan former programs ==
- Balitang Amianan
- 24 Oras Amianan
- 24 Oras North Central Luzon
- Istayl Natin
- Isyu Ngayon North and Central Luzon
- Let's Fiesta
- Primera Balita
- The Amianan Agenda
- Visita Iglesia
- Mornings with GMA Regional TV

== Rebroadcasters ==
Since October 3, 2016, the operations of GMA Ilocos (TV-5 Ilocos Norte, TV-48 Ilocos Sur and TV-7 Abra) was absorbed by the Dagupan station which led to simulcast Balitang Amianan and other regional interstitials, as well as some of the editorial and reportorial staff that are employed by the latter. GMA Ilocos were previously an originating station from 2012 to 2015, with its former flagship newscasts Balitang Ilokano and 24 Oras Ilokano. TV-7 Batanes, TV-7 Tuguegarao, TV-13 Aparri, TV-5 Mountain Province, TV-7 Isabela, TV-5 Baler and TV-10 Olongapo were former relay stations of GMA-7 Manila before being reassigned to GMA Dagupan in March 8, 2021.

Relay stations
Callsign	TV	Location (Transmitter site)	TPO	Coordinates
DZVG	5 (analog, VHF); 29 (digital, UHF)	Mt. Amuyao, Mountain Province (Note: Relay station)	10 kW (analog/digital)	17°0′43.6″N 121°7′46.9″E
D-7-ZG	7 (analog, VHF)	Peñarrubia, Abra	1 kW (analog)	17°33′18″N 120°40′20″E
D-5-AS	5 (analog, VHF); 24 (digital, UHF)	San Nicolas, Ilocos Norte	5 kW (analog); 10 kW (digital)	18°8′34.1″N 120°35′9.2″E
DWBC	48 (analog, UHF); 15 (digital, UHF)	Bantay, Ilocos Sur	5 kW (analog/digital)	17°36′9.3″N 120°29′10.5″E
DWAZ	7 (analog, VHF)	Basco, Batanes	0.1 kW (analog)	20°27′2.7″N 121°58′16.9″E
DWBB	7 (analog, VHF)	Tuguegarao, Cagayan	1 kW (analog)	17°36′34.6″N 121°43′28.8″E
DZBB	13 (analog, VHF)	Aparri, Cagayan	1 kW (analog)	18°21′15.4″N 121°38′31.2″E
DWLE	7 (analog, VHF); 15 (digital, UHF)	Santiago, Isabela	2 kW (analog); 5 kW (digital)	16°41′17.6″N 121°33′2.5″E
D-5-ZB	5 (analog, VHF)	Baler, Aurora	0.005 kW (analog)	15°46′6.2″N 121°33′31.7″E
DWNS	10 (analog, VHF); 38 (analog, UHF)	Olongapo	0.2 kW (analog); 5 kW (digital)	14°51′0.7″N 120°16′43″E

== Digital television ==
=== Digital channels ===
UHF Channel 38 (617.143 MHz)

Channel	Video	Aspect	Short name	Programming	Note
10.01	480i	4:3	GMA	GMA Dagupan/Benguet (Main DZEA-TV programming)	Commercial broadcast (15 kW)
10.02	480i	4:3	GTV	GTV	Commercial broadcast (15 kW)
10.03	480i	4:3	HEART OF ASIA	Heart of Asia Channel	Commercial broadcast (15 kW)
10.06	480i	4:3	I HEART MOVIES	I Heart Movies	Commercial broadcast (15 kW)
10.21	240p	4:3	GMA 1Seg	GMA Dagupan/Benguet Relay	1seg broadcast

== Area of coverage ==
- Portion of Benguet (including Baguio)
- Portion of Ilocos Sur (including Candon and Vigan)
- La Union (including San Fernando)
- Pangasinan (including Alaminos, Dagupan, San Carlos and Urdaneta)
- Nueva Ecija (including Cabanatuan, Gapan, Muñoz, Palayan and San Jose)
- Portion of Pampanga (including Angeles, Mabalacat and San Fernando)
- Tarlac (including Tarlac City)

== See also ==
- DWRA
- DWTL
- List of GMA Network stations
