= D-5-AS-TV =

Television station in Ilocos Norte, Philippines

GMA TV-5 Ilocos Norte (D-5-AS-TV)
Relay of DZEA-TV Dagupan
- Philippines
- Channels: Analog: 5 (VHF); Digital: 24 (UHF) (ISDB-T); Virtual: 07
- Branding: GMA TV-5 Ilocos Norte

Programming
- Subchannels: See list
- Affiliations: 7.01: GMA; 7.02: GTV; 7.03: Heart of Asia; 7.06: I Heart Movies

Ownership
- Owner: GMA Network Inc.
- Sister stations: DZHH-TV (GTV)

History
- Founded: December 25, 1962
- Former affiliations: RBS TV (1962–1972)

Technical information
- Licensing authority: NTC
- Power: 5 kW TPO (analog); 10 kW TPO (digital)
- ERP: 75 kW (analog)
- Transmitter coordinates: 18°08′34″N 120°35′09″E

Links
- Website: gmanetwork.com

D-5-AS-TV (channel 5) is a television station in Ilocos Norte, Philippines, airing programming from GMA Manila and GMA North Central Luzon. It is owned and operated by the network's namesake corporate parent alongside GTV outlet DZHH-TV (channel 27). Its 2,611 square meter transmitting facility is located at Barangay San Lorenzo, San Nicolas.

== History ==
D-5-AS-TV Channel 5 began operations on December 25, 1962, the first ever television station in Ilocos Norte. D-5-AS-TV was launched upon the establishment of GMA Network's predecessor Loreto F. de Hemedes Inc., which founded by Robert "Uncle Bob" Stewart, an American war correspondent. The company was later renamed Republic Broadcasting System a year later. This is also the network's second regional TV station after DYSS-TV in Cebu that was launched on February that year. The first ever broadcast of this kind, it made GMA the longest-running and oldest television station in the Ilocos Region.

On September 21, 1972, following the declaration of martial law by then-President Ferdinand Marcos by the virtue of Proclamation 1081, which forced the Congress and media establishments including RBS to closed down, D-5-AS-TV was shut down.

In 1976, two years after RBS was forced to cede majority control to a triumvirate composed of Gilberto Duavit Jr., Menardo Jimenez and Felipe Gozon due to the changes in media ownership laws, D-5-AS-TV was reopened with the identification of GMA Radio-Television Arts through Republic Broadcasting System, Inc. as its corporate name fourteen years later.

On April 30, 1992, as part of the network's Rainbow Satellite Network launch, Channel 5 Ilocos Norte officially became a satellite station to bring live broadcasts of Manila-sourced national programming via DZBB-TV, GMA's flagship TV station in Manila, allowing it to viewers in the Ilocos Region.

In June 2012, when TV-48 Ilocos Sur started their operations a year before, GMA Ilocos upgraded as an originating station and conceptualized a regional for the whole Ilocos Region when it began producing its local Balitang Ilokano newscast, which primarily covers the provinces of the Ilocos market, just in preparation for the launching of GMA's Regional TV division seven years later. This was only on November 10, 2014, when it relaunched its flagship local newscast 24 Oras Ilokano following the changes on its now-main newscast 24 Oras, which first aired in 2004. However, the newscast suddenly got cancelled on April 24, 2015 due to the strategic streamlining of regional operations of the network, hence GMA Ilocos closed down its originating station. Afterwards, the Ilocos Region stations were downgraded back to a 'satellite-selling' station delivering programs from Metro Manila via DZBB-TV.

The Ilocos stations, as well as Abra and Mountain Province transmitters are reassigned to Dagupan relays and began simulcasting Balitang Amianan newscast on October 3, 2016 (which later relaunched as One North Central Luzon since September 5, 2022). Channel 5 Ilocos Norte since then expands its coverage area to the northern areas of Ilocos Region and some parts of the Cordillera Administrative Region and Central Luzon, culminating that year with the formation of the network's North Central Luzon super region until it begins to split into two separate Ilocos stations in 2022.

On March 17, 2023, GMA Ilocos Norte inaugurated the state-of-the-art facility and studios located at the 2nd Floor, Red Dot Building, General Antonio Luna corner Lagasca Street, Laoag City. This also marked the debut of GMA Ilocos Norte as an semi-satellite station of GMA TV-10 Dagupan. Weeks prior to the inauguration, One North Central Luzon anchor CJ Torida, who happened to be a former personality of the now-defunct GMA Super Radyo DWRC 1269 Laoag, anchored the program live from the said facility until he went back to GMA Dagupan for a couple of weeks. Meanwhile, former Bombo Radyo Baguio and PTV Cordillera anchor Breves Bulsao joined the anchor team on May 24, 2023 and Gab de Luna as the correspondent and news producer until late July in favor of Cris Zuñiga.

In October 2023, GMA Ilocos Norte commenced its digital test broadcasts on UHF channel 24 covering the province of Ilocos Norte (including Laoag City).

== GMA TV-5 Ilocos Norte currently aired programs ==
All of the following programs are relayed from GMA North Central Luzon:

- One North Central Luzon
- Word of God Network

== GMA TV-5 Ilocos Norte previously programs ==
- Let's Fiesta
- Balitang Ilokano
- 24 Oras Ilokano
- Visita Iglesia
- Mornings with GMA Regional TV

== Digital television ==
=== Digital channels ===
UHF Channel 24 (533.143 MHz)

Channel	Video	Aspect	Short name	Programming	Note
07.01	480i	4:3	GMA	GMA Ilocos Norte	Commercial broadcast (10 kW)
07.02	480i	4:3	GTV	GTV	Commercial broadcast (10 kW)
07.03	480i	4:3	HEART OF ASIA	Heart of Asia	Commercial broadcast (10 kW)
07.06	480i	4:3	I HEART MOVIES	I Heart Movies	Commercial broadcast (10 kW)
07.21	240p	4:3	GMA 1SEG	GMA Ilocos Norte Relay	1seg broadcast

== Area of coverage ==
- Portion of Ilocos Norte

== See also ==
- List of GMA Network stations
