= Arangkada (TV program) =

- Genre: Newscast
- Presented by: Kate Chaves; Jovani Gustilo; Carol Velagio
- Country of origin: Philippines
- Original language: Hiligaynon

Production
- Camera setup: Multiple-camera setup
- Running time: 60 minutes
- Production company: GMA News and Public Affairs

Original release
- Network: GMA Iloilo; GMA Bacolod
- Release: October 8, 2007 – April 24, 2015

Arangkada (Ang Trip Mo Kung Aga) (transl. Ride! Your Trip Every Morning) is a Philippine television newscast and talkshow broadcast by GMA Iloilo for the Western Visayas region. Originally anchored by Mark Nunieza and Charlene Belvis, it premiered on October 8, 2007. The newscast concluded on April 24, 2015. Jovanni Gustilo, Carol Velagio and Kate Chavez served as the final hosts.

== Overview ==
The show pre-empted the 2nd hour of Unang Hirit in the 6:15 am to 7:15 am block (Philippine Standard Time). This show is now also simulcast over GMA Roxas (Channel 5), GMA Kalibo (Channel 2) and GMA Sipalay (Channel 10).

On April 24, 2015, Arangkada was formally cancelled after more than 7 years without saying goodbyes to the viewing public, due to the streamlining of GMA regional network's operations that caused a massive lay-off of 24 employees of GMA Iloilo alone, including Arangkada hosts and staff.

GMA Iloilo would not have a regional morning newscast until 5 years later, with the launch of GMA Regional TV Early Edition on August 31, 2020.

== Final hosts ==
- Kate Chaves
- Jovani Gustilo
- Carol Velagio

== Former hosts ==
- Mark Nunieza
- Charlene Belvis
- Mama Monyeka
- Joan Jalandoni
- Jason Gregorio
- Enrico Surita Jr.
- Mark "Makoy" Abapo
