= GMA Regional TV Early Edition =

Philippine television show

- Title card since 2023
- Genre: News broadcasting
- Directed by: Diosdado Tan
- Presented by: Adrian Prietos; John Sala
- Narrated by: Al Torres
- Country of origin: Philippines
- Original language: Hiligaynon

Production
- Executive producer: Julius Iron Belaca-ol
- Production locations: GMA Bacolod Studios, 3/F iSecure Bldg. Rizal Cor. Locsin St., Bacolod; GMA Iloilo Compound, Phase 5, Alta Tierra Village, MacArthur Drive, Barangay Quintin Salas, Jaro, Iloilo City
- Camera setup: Multiple-camera setup
- Running time: 25 minutes
- Production companies: GMA Integrated News; GMA Regional TV

Original release
- Network: GMA Bacolod; GMA Iloilo
- Release: August 31, 2020 – January 26, 2024

GMA Regional TV Early Edition is a Philippine television news broadcasting show broadcast by GMA Bacolod and GMA Iloilo. Originally hosted by Atty. Sedfrey Cabaluna, Kaitlene Rivilla, and Adrian Prietos, it premiered on August 31, 2020. Adrian Prietos, Zen Quilantang-Sasa and John Sala served as the show's final hosts. The program concluded its final episode on January 26, 2024.

== Overview ==
The program is the second unified morning show in Western Visayas, more than five years after its predecessor Arangkada (Ang Trip Mo Kung Aga) went off the air following the strategic streamlining of programs and manpower on GMA's provincial stations.

GMA Regional TV Early Edition broadcasts live from the GMA Channels 13 and 30 Bacolod Studios in Bacolod City and GMA Channel 6 Iloilo Complex in Iloilo City with simulcast on GMA Channel 5 Roxas, GMA Channel 2 Kalibo and GMA Channel 10 Sipalay.

Starting February 6, 2023, the program shifted from a pre-recorded presentation to a live broadcast (although some Spotlight and BizTalk segments are pre-recorded) as part of the rebranding of GMA Regional TV, integrating news reports alongside interviews with personalities all over Western Visayas. Kaitlene Rivilla left the newscast on July 31, 2023 to focus on One Western Visayas. No permanent replacement for Rivilla was named although John Sala mostly took over the Iloilo hosting duties until Zen Quilantang-Sasa joined Adrian Prietos for the morning show's final month.

== Final segments ==
- Spotlight
- BizTalk
- Unang Balita
- GMA Integrated News Weather Center
- Namit Gid Express
- Nabal-an Mo Na? (formerly Kabalo Na Kamo?)
- Binag-Binag

== Hosts ==
=== Final hosts ===
- Adrian Prietos (2020-24, GMA Bacolod)
- John Sala (Co-host; 2023-24, GMA Iloilo)
- Zen Quilantang-Sasa (Co-host; 2024, GMA Iloilo)

=== Former hosts ===
- Atty. Sedfrey Cabaluna (Main host; 2020-21, GMA Iloilo)
- Kaitlene Rivilla (Co-host; 2020-23, GMA Iloilo)
