= Primera Balita =

- Genre: News broadcasting
- Presented by: Alfie Tulagan; Jette Arcellana
- Country of origin: Philippines
- Original language: Filipino

Production
- Camera setup: Multiple-camera setup
- Running time: 45-60 minutes
- Production company: GMA News and Public Affairs

Original release
- Network: GMA Dagupan
- Release: April 27, 2009 – April 24, 2015

Related
- Mornings with GMA Regional TV

Primera Balita (transl. First News) is a Philippine television news broadcasting program broadcast by GMA Dagupan that aired from April 27, 2009, to April 24, 2015.

== Overview ==
The program preempts the second hour of Unang Hirit (around 6:00 to 7:00am) block. Few days after the finale, it was revealed that the program was cancelled by the network due to the strategic streamlining undertaken to all of its regional stations.

GMA Dagupan would not have a regional morning newscast until five years later, with the launch of Mornings with GMA Regional TV.

== Final hosts ==
- Alfie Tulagan
- Jette Arcellana

== Former hosts ==
- CJ Torida
- Joyce Segui
- May Velasco
- Peha Lagao
- Ivy Andrada
- Mike Sabado
- Mina Gutierrez
- Joanne Ponsoy
