= DWNS-TV =

GMA TV-10 Olongapo (DWNS-TV)
Relay of DZEA-TV
- Philippines
- City: Olongapo
- Channels: Analog: 10 (VHF); Digital: 38 (UHF) (ISDB-T) (test broadcast); Virtual: 10.01
- Branding: GMA TV-10 Olongapo

Programming
- Subchannels: See list
- Network: GMA Network

Ownership
- Owner: GMA Network Inc.
- Sister stations: DWRG-TV (GTV)

History
- First air date: 1984

Technical information
- Licensing authority: NTC
- Power: Analog: 1,000 watts Digital: 5,000 watts
- ERP: Analog: 3,000 watts Digital: 10,000 watts

Links
- Website: GMANetwork.com

DWNS-TV (channel 10) is a television station in Olongapo City, Philippines, airing programming from GMA Manila and GMA North Central Luzon. It is owned and operated by the network's namesake corporate parent alongside GTV outlet DWRG-TV (channel 26). Both stations share transmitter facilities atop Upper Mabayuan, Olongapo.

== GMA TV-10 Olongapo currently aired programs ==
- One North Central Luzon

== GMA TV-10 Olongapo previously aired programs ==
- Mornings with GMA Regional TV

== Digital television ==
=== Digital channels ===
UHF Channel 38 (617.143 MHz)

Channel	Video	Aspect	Short name	Programming	Note
10.01	480i	4:3	GMA	GMA Olongapo	Commercial broadcast (5 kW)
10.02	480i	4:3	GTV	GTV	Commercial broadcast (5 kW)
10.03	480i	4:3	HEART OF ASIA	Heart of Asia Channel	Commercial broadcast (5 kW)
10.06	480i	4:3	I HEART MOVIES	I Heart Movies	Commercial broadcast (5 kW)
10.21	240p	4:3	GMA 1SEG	GMA Olongapo Relay	1seg broadcast

== See also ==
- DZEA-TV
- DZBB-TV
- List of GMA Network stations
