= D-5-ZB-TV =

GMA TV-5 Baler (D-5-ZB-TV)
- Baler, Aurora; Philippines
- City: Baler, Aurora
- Channels: Analog: 5 (VHF); Digital: TBA (UHF)
- Branding: GMA TV-5 Baler

Programming
- Affiliations: GMA

Ownership
- Owner: GMA Network Inc.

History
- First air date: 1994

Technical information
- Licensing authority: NTC
- Power: 500 watts
- ERP: 1 kilowatt

Links
- Website: GMANetwork.com

D-5-ZB-TV (channel 5) is a television station in Aurora, Philippines, airing programming from GMA Manila and GMA North Central Luzon. Owned and operated by the network's namesake corporate parent, the station maintains transmitter facilities at Purok 3, Brgy. Buhangin, Baler.

== GMA TV-5 Baler current programs ==
- One North Central Luzon

== GMA TV-5 Baler former programs ==
- Mornings with GMA Regional TV

== See also ==
- DZEA-TV
- DZBB-TV
- List of GMA Network stations
