= DWRA =

Radio station in Baguio, Philippines

Barangay LS Baguio (DWRA)
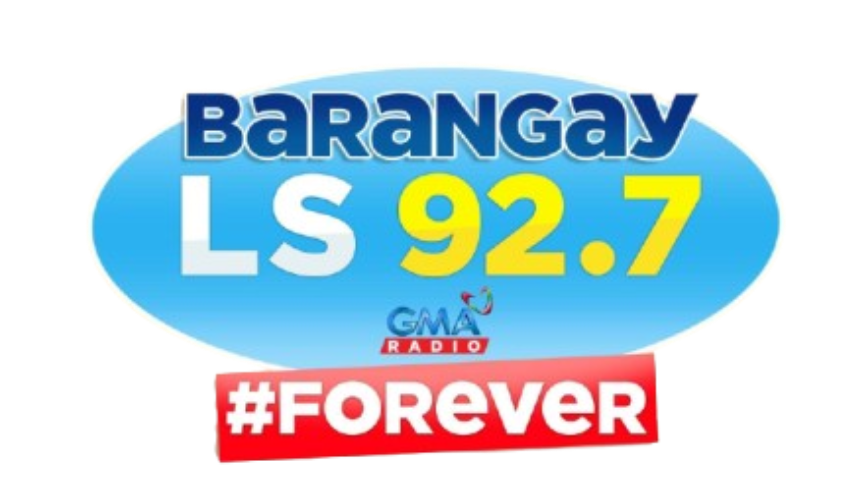
- Baguio; Philippines
- Broadcast area: Benguet, La Union and surrounding areas
- Frequency: 92.7 MHz
- Branding: Barangay LS 92.7

Programming
- Languages: Ilocano, Filipino
- Format: Contemporary MOR, OPM
- Network: Barangay LS

Ownership
- Owner: GMA Network Inc.
- Sister stations: GMA TV-10 (DZEA); GTV-22 (DWDG)

History
- First air date: October 6, 1996
- Former names: Campus Radio (October 6, 1996–February 16, 2014)
- Call sign meaning: Radio

Technical information
- Licensing authority: NTC
- Power: 10,000 watts
- ERP: 25,000 watts

Links
- Website: www.gmanetwork.com

DWRA (92.7 FM), broadcasting as Barangay LS 92.7, is a radio station owned and operated by GMA Network, Inc. The station's studio is located at the 4th Floor EDY Building Baguio City, and its transmitter is located at Sitio Lamut, Barangay Beckel, La Trinidad, Benguet.

== History ==
=== 1996–2014: Campus Radio ===
The station was established on October 6, 1996, as Campus Radio. It switched to mass-based format.

=== 2014–present: Barangay ===
Barangay FM 92.7 logo from 2023 to 2026

On February 17, 2014, as part of RGMA's brand unification, the station rebranded as Barangay 92.7 and carried-over the slogan "Isang Bansa, Isang Barangay". In 2017, the station was rebranded as Barangay FM 92.7. In 2019, the station adapted its tagline "Ayos!", which was used by several Campus Radio stations.

On April 5, 2026, the station adapted the Barangay LS branding from its flagship station in Metro Manila.

== Awards and recognition ==
In 2002 and 2003, the station was selected finalist in the KBP Golden Dove Awards for Best Provincial Radio Variety Show (Campus Centerfold) and Provincial Radio Variety Show Host (Bobby Boom). In 2010 and 2011, the station's program Talk To Papa was selected finalist for Best Radio Counseling Program in the Catholic Mass Media Awards. In 2011, the station's Mga Kuwentong Karnero (now called Pelikulang Panradyo) was selected finalist for Best Radio Drama program. Papa Boom was also voted Best Male DJ in 2011 and 2012 by the UP Baguio Dap-ay Awards for Media.

== Events ==
Radio GMA Baguio is known in the Northern Luzon events scene for its trademark band competition, "Bulaklak Rock" which started in 2004 until 2011. In 2012, they launched "Bulaklak Rock: Acoustic Session" at Panagbenga Festival's Session Road In Bloom. In 2013, they staged the first "Campus Radio Streetjump Session: Baguio's Ultimate Dance Battle" for the dance crews in Northern Luzon.
