= GMA News =

News division of GMA Network

- GMA News logo since 2026
- Formerly: RBS News Department; GMA Radio-Television News; GMA Rainbow Satellite News; GMA News and Public Affairs; GMA Integrated News
- Type: Division
- Headquarters: GMA Network Center, Quezon City, Philippines
- Area served: Worldwide
- Key people: Michelle Seva (Officer-in-Charge, GMA News; Vice President, News Programs and Specials); Grace dela Peña-Reyes (Consultant, News); Glenn Allona (First Vice President, Radio Operations); John Manalastas (Editor-in-Chief, GMA News Online)
- Parent: GMA Network, Inc.
- Website: gmanetwork.com/news

GMA News (formerly known as RBS News Department, GMA Radio-Television News and GMA Rainbow Satellite News, GMA News and Public Affairs and GMA Integrated News) is the news division of the Philippine media company GMA Network, Inc.

The division produces news programs and content for GMA Network's free-to-air TV channels (GMA Network and GTV), national radio station (Super Radyo DZBB 594), regional television and radio stations in the Philippines (GMA Regional TV and GMA Radio), international TV channels (GMA Pinoy TV, GMA Life TV and GMA News TV International) and online and social media platforms (GMA News Online).

== History ==
Logos of GMA News

2002 to 2022 logo with Serbisyong Totoo tagline

2010 to 2022 wordmark

2022 to 2026 Integrated News logo

Established in 1959 as the radio news and commentary division of Metro Manila radio station DZBB, GMA News is one of the oldest news and public affairs departments in any Philippine media network. Throughout its long existence, it pioneered trends in radio and TV news gathering and current affairs production.

In October 2022, following the retirement of Marissa Flores as the head of GMA News and Public Affairs, the public affairs division was spun-off as GMA Public Affairs, and the news division was subsequently renamed "GMA Integrated News" under the leadership of Integrated News, Regional TV and Synergy head Oliver Victor B. Amoroso. The rebranding was intended to emphasize the combined resources of its television, digital, radio, and regional platforms.

On March 30, 2026, the "GMA Integrated News" branding was dropped in favour of reviving the "GMA News" brand and its historic Serbisyong Totoo slogan which has been used since 2002. Vice President of News Programs and Specials Michelle Seva was appointed as the Officer-in-Charge of GMA News following Amoroso's early retirement.

== Campaigns ==
=== GMA Weather (formerly IMReady and GMA Integrated News Weather Center) ===
The GMA Weather is the news division's weather forecasting subdivision originally launched in 2010 as IMReady, a public safety and preparedness campaign of GMA News and Public Affairs. IMReady is the country's first 24/7, one-stop shop for public safety information.

IMReady was forged through a partnership between GMA and several government agencies including DOST-PAGASA and Metropolitan Manila Development Authority (MMDA). It also draws support from GMA's collaboration with Google and Waze.

In 2014, GMA New Media, the technology and digital arm of GMA launched the mobile application IMReady wherein users can see real-time information and updates including weather, traffic situations, and news alerts. It is available on iOS and Android phones.

As part of the changes within GMA Integrated News, IMReady was renamed to GMA Integrated News Weather Center in 2023, focusing on weather forecasting with an 'expanded' roster of forecasters, succeeding Nathaniel Cruz, who retired as its resident meteorologist.

=== Think Before You Click ===
The social media responsibility campaign "Think Before You Click" by GMA News and Public Affairs was spearheaded by former GMA Vice President for Professional Development and journalist Howie Severino, reminding netizens to be responsible with every click they make on social media or anywhere online. The campaign was honored with the 2011 Civility Star Award by the Civility Counts Project; and was awarded with the Safe Surfer Award in the 2012 Globe Tatt Awards.

== Programs ==
=== Currently aired TV programs ===
GMA Network

- 24 Oras
- 24 Oras Weekend
- GMA News Bulletin
- Saksi
- Unang Hirit (Unang Balita) (co-production with GMA Public Affairs)
GTV
- 24 Oras
- 24 Oras Weekend
- Balitanghali
- Dobol B TV (co-production with Super Radyo DZBB)
- GMA News Bulletin
- State of the Nation
- Usap-usapan: What We Know So Far

Regional TV programs (GMA Regional TV)

- Balitang Bisdak (GMA Cebu)
- One Mindanao (GMA Davao, GMA Cagayan de Oro and GMA General Santos)
- One North Central Luzon (GMA North Central Luzon)
- Ratsada Balita (GMA Iloilo and GMA Bacolod)

=== Upcoming TV programs ===
Regional newscasts (GMA Regional TV) (2027)

- Balitang Waraynon (GMA Tacloban)
- Balitang Palawan (GMA Palawan)
- One Southern Mindanao (GMA Davao)
- One Western Mindanao (GMA Zamboanga)
- One Northern Mindanao (GMA Cagayan de Oro)
- One South Central Mindanao (GMA General Santos)
- One Northern Luzon (GMA Ilocos Sur, GMA Ilocos Norte, GMA Tuguegarao)
- Balitang Negros (GMA Bacolod)
- Balitang Bicolandia (GMA Bicol)
- Balitang Southern Tagalog (GMA Batangas)

=== Defunct TV programs ===
==== Defunct regional newscasts ====
- 24 Oras Amianan (GMA 10 Dagupan)
- 24 Oras Bikol (GMA 7 Naga)
- 24 Oras Central Visayas (GMA 7 Cebu)—rebranded as GMA Regional TV Balitang Bisdak
- 24 Oras Davao (GMA 5 Davao)
- 24 Oras Ilokano (GMA 5 Laoag)
- 24 Oras North Central Luzon (GMA 10 Dagupan)
- 24 Oras Northern Mindanao (GMA 12 and 35 Cagayan de Oro)
- 24 Oras Southern Mindanao (GMA 5 Davao)
- 24 Oras Western Visayas (GMA 6 Iloilo)
- GMA Regional TV Balitang Amianan (GMA 10 Dagupan)—rebranded as GMA Regional TV One North Central Luzon
- At Home with GMA Regional TV (GMA Davao, GMA Cagayan de Oro, GMA Zamboanga and GMA General Santos)
- Balitang Ilokano (GMA 5 Laoag and 48 Ilocos Sur/Abra)
- Baretang Bikol (GMA 7 Naga)
- GMA Regional TV Early Edition (GMA Iloilo and GMA Bacolod)
- GMA Regional TV Live! (GMA Cebu)
- Mornings with GMA Regional TV (GMA North Central Luzon)
- Ratsada (GMA 6 Iloilo)
- Ratsada 24 Oras (GMA 6 Iloilo)
- Regional TV News (GTV) - (now a segment of Balitanghali)
- Testigo (GMA 5 Davao)—rebranded as GMA Regional TV One Mindanao
- Testigo Northern Mindanao (GMA 12 and 35 Cagayan de Oro)

==== Defunct regional public affairs shows ====
- Arangkada (GMA 6 Iloilo)—rebranded as GMA RTV Early Edition
- Buena Mano Balita (GMA 7 Cebu)—rebranded as GMA Regional TV Live!
- Isyu Ngayon
  - Isyu Karon Socsksargen (GMA 8 General Santos)
  - Isyu Karon Southern Mindanao (GMA 5 Davao)
  - Isyu Karon Northern Mindanao (GMA 12 and 35 Cagayan de Oro)
  - Isyu Karon Central Visayas (GMA 7 Cebu)
  - Isyu Mindanao (GMA 5 Davao, GMA 35 Cagayan de Oro and GMA General Santos)
  - Isyu Ngayon North Central Luzon (GMA 10 Dagupan)
  - Isyu Ngonian Bicolandia (GMA 7 Naga and GMA 12 Legazpi)
  - Isyu Subong Ilonggo (GMA 6 Iloilo)
  - Isyu Subong Negrense (GMA 13 and 30 Bacolod)—rebranded as One Western Visayas and late Ratsada Balita
- Isyu ug Istorya (GMA 5 Davao, GMA 35 Cagayan de Oro and GMA 8 General Santos)
- Primera Balita (GMA 10 Dagupan)—rebranded as Mornings With GMA Regional TV
- Una Ka BAI (GMA 5 Davao)—rebranded as At Home With GMA RTV

=== Online ===
Digital programs and content published online under GMA Integrated News Digital and GMA Online Exclusives.

Newscast

- Stand For Truth (YouTube)
- @gmanews #tweetcap (Twitter)
- GMA Integrated NewsFeed (#GMAnewsfeed) (Facebook)

Podcast

- The Howie Severino Podcast
- Surprise Guest with Pia Arcangel
- The Mangahas Interviews
- Share Ko Lang with Dr. Anna
- Updated with Nelson Canlas

Content

- ATM (Adventure.Taste.Moments) (YouTube)
- GMA Integrated NewsFeed (formerly GMA NewsFeed) (YouTube)
- Make Your Day (YouTube)
- Need to Know (YouTube)
- Next Now (YouTube)
Specials
- Adulting with Atom Araullo (YouTube)
- All Access with Joyce Pring (YouTube)
- ExB Rules (YouTube)
- Fact or Fake with Joseph Morong (YouTube)
- #FYI with Richard Heydarian (YouTube)
- #Goals with Gabbi Garcia (YouTube)
- Pinoy Christmas In Our Hearts (YouTube)
- TasteMNL with Arra San Agustin (YouTube)
- Thousanaire with Reese Tuazon (YouTube)

Drama

- Zero Kilometers Away (YouTube)
- In My Dreams (YouTube)

== Current personalities ==
=== Flagship news anchors ===
==== GMA Network and GTV ====
Presenter	Program/s	Notes
Arnold Clavio	Unang Hirit	
Susan Enriquez	Unang Hirit	Also part of GMA Public Affairs as host of IJuander and Pera Paraan
Mariz Umali	Unang Hirit	
Ivan Mayrina	Unang Hirit, 24 Oras Weekend	
Raffy Tima	Balitanghali	
Connie Sison	Balitanghali	
Mel Tiangco	24 Oras	Also part of GMA Entertainment Group as host of Magpakailanman
Vicky Morales	24 Oras	Also part of GMA Public Affairs as host of Wish Ko Lang! and Good News Kasama si Vicky Morales
Emil Sumangil	24 Oras	Also part of GMA Public Affairs as host of Resibo: Walang Lusot ang May Atraso
Kim Atienza	24 Oras	Also part of GMA Entertainment Group as host of TiktoClock and GMA Public Affairs as host of Dami Mong Alam, Kuya Kim!
Pia Arcangel	24 Oras Weekend, Saksi	
Atom Araullo	State of the Nation	Also part of GMA Public Affairs as host of I-Witness and The Atom Araullo Specials

==== GMA Regional TV ====
Presenter	Program/s	Notes
Cris Zuñiga	One North Central Luzon	
Lou Anne Mae Rondina	Balitang Bisdak	
Gerthrode Charlotte Tan	Ratsada Balita	
Adrian Prietos	Ratsada Balita	
Sarah Hilomen-Velasco	One Mindanao	
Cyril Chaves	One Mindanao	
James Paolo Yap	One Mindanao	

==== Super Radyo DZBB 594kHz ====
Presenter	Program	Notes
Joel Reyes Zobel	Super Balita sa Umaga Nationwide, Saksi sa Dobol B	
Melo Del Prado	Melo Del Prado sa Super Radyo DZBB, Super Balita sa Umaga Nationwide	
Rowena Salvacion	Saksi sa Dobol B, Dobol Weng sa Dobol B	
Arnold Clavio	One on One: Walang Personalan	
Connie Sison	One on One: Walang Personalan, Pinoy M.D. sa DZBB	
Susan Enriquez	Usap Tayo, Super Kwentuhan with Mark and Susan	
Mark Salazar	Usap Tayo, Super Kwentuhan with Mark and Susan	
Weng Dela Peña	Ano'ng Say Nyo?, Dobol Weng sa Dobol B	Also serves as main voice-over of GMA Network
Orly Trinidad	Saksi sa Dobol B, Super Balita sa Tanghali Nationwide, Buena Manong Balita	
Lala Roque	Super Balita sa Tanghali Nationwide, Bahay at Buhay	
Toni Aquino	Sumasapuso, Super Balita sa Umaga Sunday Edition	
Rene Sta. Cruz	Hataw sa Hapon, Bigtime Balita	
Howard Medina	The Longtall Howard Medina Show	
Fernan Gulapa	Umaga Na, Balita Na Saturday Edition, Sunday Gwapo	
Kathy San Gabriel	S.O.S. Serbisyo On the Spot, Super Balita sa Umaga Saturday Edition	
Emil Sumangil	Super Balita sa Umaga Saturday Edition	
Henry Atuelan	Riding-in-tandem sa Balita	
Shirley Escalante	Super Balita sa Gabi	

=== Journalists and correspondents ===
==== Main Roster ====
- Marisol Abdurahman
- Sandra Aguinaldo
- James Agustin
- Bam Alegre
- Jonathan Andal
- Jhomer Apresto
- Vonne Aquino
- Darlene Cay
- John Consulta
- Ian Cruz
- Chino Gaston
- EJ Gomez
- Gabriel Gonzales
- Mav Gonzales
- Ivan Mayrina
- Joseph Morong
- Oscar Oida
- Tina Panganiban-Perez
- Bea Pinlac
- Maki Pulido
- Bernadette Reyes
- Mark Salazar
- Jamie Santos
- Katrina Son
- JP Soriano
- Emil Sumangil
- Raffy Tima
- Dano Tingcungco
- Mariz Umali
- Jun Veneracion

Special correspondents

Entertainment

- Nelson Canlas
- Aubrey Carampel
- Lhar Santiago
- Athena Imperial

==== Super Radyo DZBB 594kHz ====
- Pamela Adriano
- Isa Avendaño-Umali
- Olan Bola
- Mao Dela Cruz
- Allan Gatus
- Mark Makalalad
- Christian Maño
- Carlo Mateo
- Kaye Morales
- Sam Nielsen
- Zen Obanil
- Nimfa Ravelo
- Luisito Santos
- Tuesday Segun-Niu
- Manny Vargas
- Rod Vega
- Paolo Villena

==== GMA Regional TV ====
- Julius Belaca-ol
- Glam Calicdan-Dizon
- Cyril Chaves
- Alan Domingo
- Fe Marie Dumaboc
- Jandi Esteban
- Jasmin Gabriel-Galban
- Sendee Salvacio
- Sarah Hilomen-Velasco
- Joecel Huesca
- Orchids Lapingcao
- Efren Mamac
- Rudje Mar Sucaldito
- Jewel May Fernandez
- Thess Ordales
- Aileen Pedreso
- Adrian Prietos
- Cecille Quibod-Castro
- Zen Quilantang-Sasa
- Danica Raneses
- Rgil Relator
- Lou Anne Mae Rondina
- John Sala
- Kim Salinas
- Nikko Sereno
- Gerthrode Charlotte Tan
- CJ Torida
- James Paolo Yap
- Cris Zuñiga

==== Segment Presenters ====
Entertainment and variety

- Suzi Entrata-Abrera
- Lyn Ching-Pascual
- Iya Villania-Arellano
- Nelson Canlas
- Shaira Diaz-Guzman
- Kaloy Tingcungco
- Jenzel Angeles
- Roxie Smith
- Anjay Anson
- Kim Perez
- Cheska Fausto
- Sean Lucas
- Chef JR Royol
- Chef Boy Logro
- Boy Abunda
Legal
- Atty. Gaby Concepcion
- Atty. Romy Macalintal
- Atty. Rowena Daroy-Morales

Sports

- Martin Javier
- Anton Roxas
- Martin Antonio

Weather (GMA Integrated News Weather Center)

- Anjo Pertierra
- Amor Larrosa
- Kim Atienza

Miscellaneous

- Rhoda Castro-Caliwara
