= DWBC-TV =

Television station in Bantay, Philippines

GMA Ilocos Sur (DWBC-TV)
Relay of DZEA-TV Dagupan
- Philippines
- Channels: Analog: 48 (UHF); Digital: 15 (UHF) (ISDB-T) (test broadcast); Virtual: 48.01
- Branding: GMA TV-48 Ilocos Sur

Programming
- Subchannels: See list
- Affiliations: GMA Network

Ownership
- Owner: GMA Network Inc.

History
- Founded: 2011

Technical information
- Power: Analog: 5 kW; Digital: 5 kW
- Transmitter coordinates: 17°36′9″N 120°29′11″E

Links
- Website: gmanetwork.com

DWBC-TV (channel 48) is a television station in Ilocos Sur, Philippines, airing programming from GMA network. Owned and operated by the network's namesake corporate parent, the station maintains hybrid analog and digital transmitting facilities atop Mt. Caniao, Bantay, Ilocos Sur.

== About DWBC-TV ==
- 2011 - GMA TV-48 Ilocos Sur began its broadcast via transmitter based at Mt. Caniao, Bantay, Ilocos Sur.
- June 7, 2012 - GMA Ilocos launched as an originating station with its state-of-the-art facilities and studios located at Brgy. Bayubay Sur, San Vicente, which primarily covers the provinces of Ilocos Norte (via Channel 5), Abra (Channel 7) and Ilocos Sur (via Channel 48).
- June 25, 2012 - GMA Ilocos launched its flagship local newscast Balitang Ilokano (later as 24 Oras Ilokano)
- October 3, 2016 - GMA Ilocos began to simulcast GMA Dagupan's Balitang Amianan.
- February 5, 2021 - GMA Ilocos started digital test broadcasts on UHF 15 covering Vigan and the provinces of Ilocos Sur and Ilocos Norte.
- April 13, 2022 - GMA Ilocos reinaugurates its station in San Vicente, Ilocos Sur.
- 2022 - GMA Ilocos begins to split into two: GMA Ilocos Sur and GMA Ilocos Norte. On September 5, 2022, it started carrying One North Central Luzon, as part of GMA's plan to strengthen its regional news operation.

== Currently aired program ==
- One North Central Luzon

== Previously aired programs ==
- Balitang Ilokano
- 24 Oras Ilokano
- Mornings with GMA Regional TV

== Rebroadcasters ==
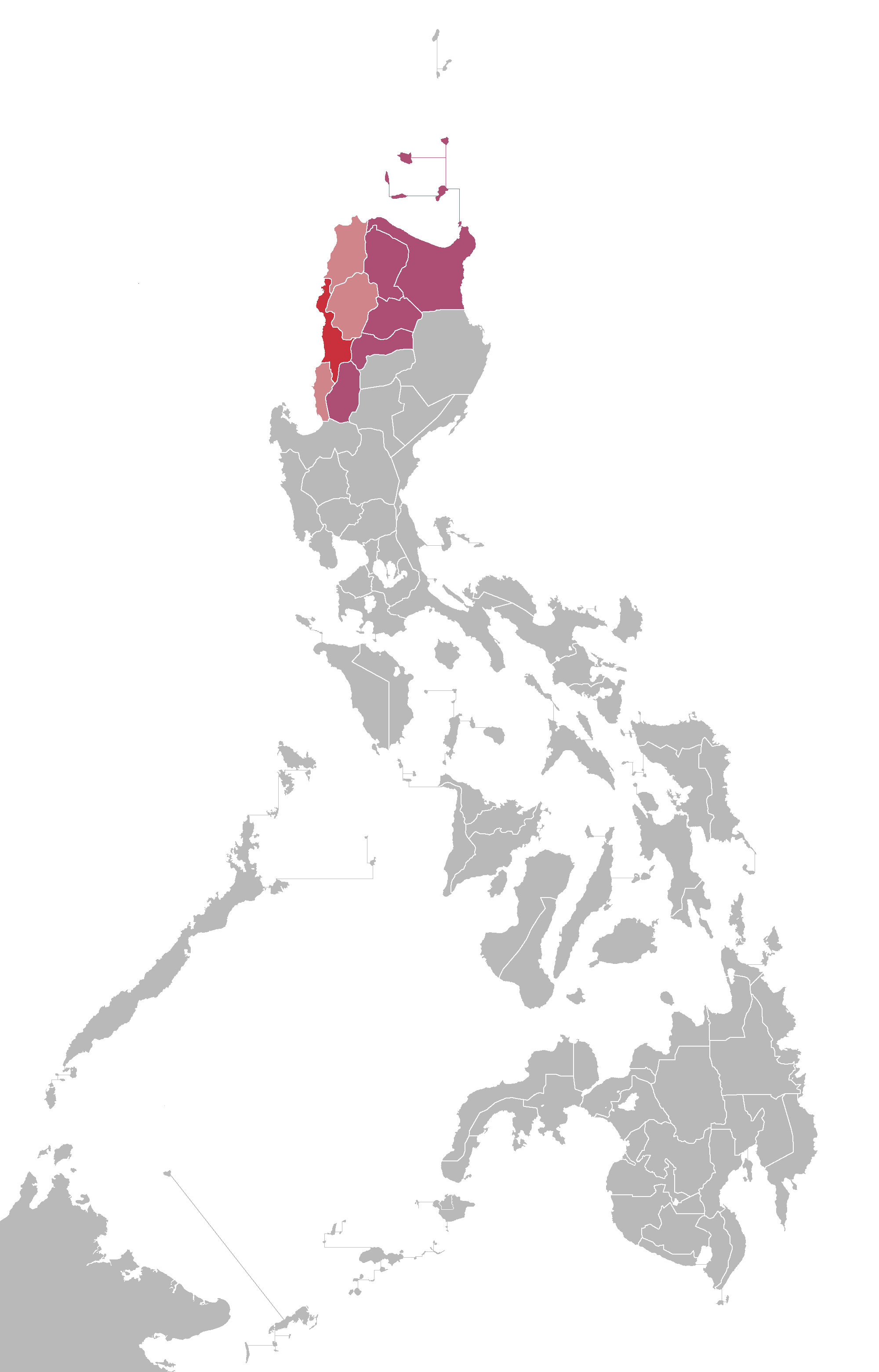
Red: Home location of GMA Ilocos Light red and red: Market audience of GMA Ilocos Violet: Areas that may receive signals from GMA Ilocos

DWBC-TV's programming is relayed to the following stations across North Luzon.

Callsign	Location	Channels	ERP
D-5-AS	San Nicolas, Ilocos Norte	5 (VHF) (analog); 24 (UHF) (digital)	5 kW (analog); 10 kW (digital)
D-7-ZG	Peñarrubia, Abra	7 (VHF)	1 kW

== Digital television ==
=== Digital channels ===
UHF Channel 15 (479.143 MHz)

Channel	Video	Aspect	Short name	Programming	Note
48.01	480i	4:3	GMA	GMA Ilocos Sur	Commercial broadcast (5 kW)
48.02	480i	4:3	GTV	GTV	Commercial broadcast (5 kW)
48.03	480i	4:3	HEART OF ASIA	Heart of Asia Channel	Commercial broadcast (5 kW)
48.06	480i	4:3	I HEART MOVIES	I Heart Movies	Commercial broadcast (5 kW)
48.21	240p	4:3	GMA 1SEG	GMA Ilocos Sur Relay	1seg broadcast

== Area of coverage ==
- Portions of:
  - Abra
  - Ilocos Norte
  - Ilocos Sur (including Vigan)
  - La Union

== See also ==
- List of GMA Network stations
- DZBC-DTV (Former TV Station Used the call sign DWBC-TV)
