= Mornings with GMA Regional TV =

Philippine television program

- Title card from 2023 to 2024
- Genre: News broadcasting
- Directed by: Nestor C. Casela
- Presented by: Joanne Ponsoy; CJ Torida
- Narrated by: Al Torres
- Country of origin: Philippines
- Original languages: Tagalog (main); Pangasinan; Ilocano; Kapampangan (de facto)

Production
- Executive producers: Glam Calicdan-Dizon; Cris Zuñiga
- Production locations: GMA Dagupan Broadcast Center, Claveria Road, Malued District, Dagupan City; GMA Ilocos Studios, Brgy. Baubay Sur, San Vicente, Ilocos Sur (2022)
- Camera setup: Multiple-camera setup
- Running time: 25 minutes
- Production companies: GMA Integrated News; GMA Regional TV

Original release
- Network: GMA 10 Dagupan; GMA 48 Ilocos Sur
- Release: September 28, 2020 – January 26, 2024

Mornings with GMA Regional TV is a 2020 Philippine television morning news broadcasting show broadcast by GMA Dagupan and GMA Ilocos. Originally hosted by Ara Hanesh and Ralph Guieb (later Angelica Maglanoc), it premiered on September 28, 2020. The program concluded on January 26, 2024, due to low ratings and decline viewership. Joanne Ponsoy and CJ Torida serve as the final hosts.

== Overview ==
The program is the first unified morning show in North Central Luzon, more than five years after its predecessor Primera Balita, airing on GMA Dagupan, went off the air following the strategic streamlining of programs and manpower on GMA's provincial stations.

Mornings with GMA Regional TV broadcasts live from the GMA Dagupan Station with simulcast on GMA Ilocos Norte (Channel 5), GMA Ilocos Sur (Channel 48), GMA Channel 7 Abra, GMA Channel 5 Mountain Province, GMA Channel 13 Aparri, GMA Channel 7 Tuguegarao, GMA Channel 7 Batanes, GMA Channel 7 Isabela, GMA Channel 5 Baler and GMA Channel 10 Olongapo.

Less than a month later, Ralph Guieb left the program leaving Ara Hanesh (formerly from ABS-CBN Dagupan) as solo anchor of the program. Eight months later, Harold Reyes was announced as the new co-host of Hanesh, although the latter had her last appearance on December 17, 2021. Co-host Angelica Maglanoc joined Reyes on January 3, 2022, and stayed until April that same year. Co-host CJ Torida replaced Maglanoc until February 3, 2023, and replaced Reyes later by July 3 the same year.

On February 6, 2023, the program shifted from a pre-recorded presentation to live broadcasts (although some Spotlight and BizTalk segments are pre-recorded) as part of the rebranding of GMA Regional TV, integrating news reports alongside interviews with personalities all over North Central Luzon and expanding its coverage areas to the Southern Tagalog and Bicol regions. Co-host and correspondent Joanne Ponsoy joined the show as part of this change.

== Final segments ==
- BizTalk
- Business Matters
- Globalita
- Bantay Presyo
- GMA Integrated News Weather Center
- Mangan Tila
- Alam Mo Ba?
- Mangan Tila Express
- #MorningFeels
- Pampa-Good Vibes
- Spotlight
- Unang Balita

== Hosts ==
=== Final hosts ===
- Joanne Ponsoy (2023–24, GMA Dagupan)
- CJ Torida (2023–24, GMA Dagupan)

=== Former hosts ===
- Ralph Guieb (2020, GMA Dagupan)
- Ara Hanesh (2020–21, GMA Dagupan)
- Angelica Maglanoc (2021–22, GMA Ilocos)
- Harold Reyes (2021–23, GMA Dagupan)
