= DWTL =

Radio station in Dagupan, Philippines

Barangay LS Dagupan (DWTL)
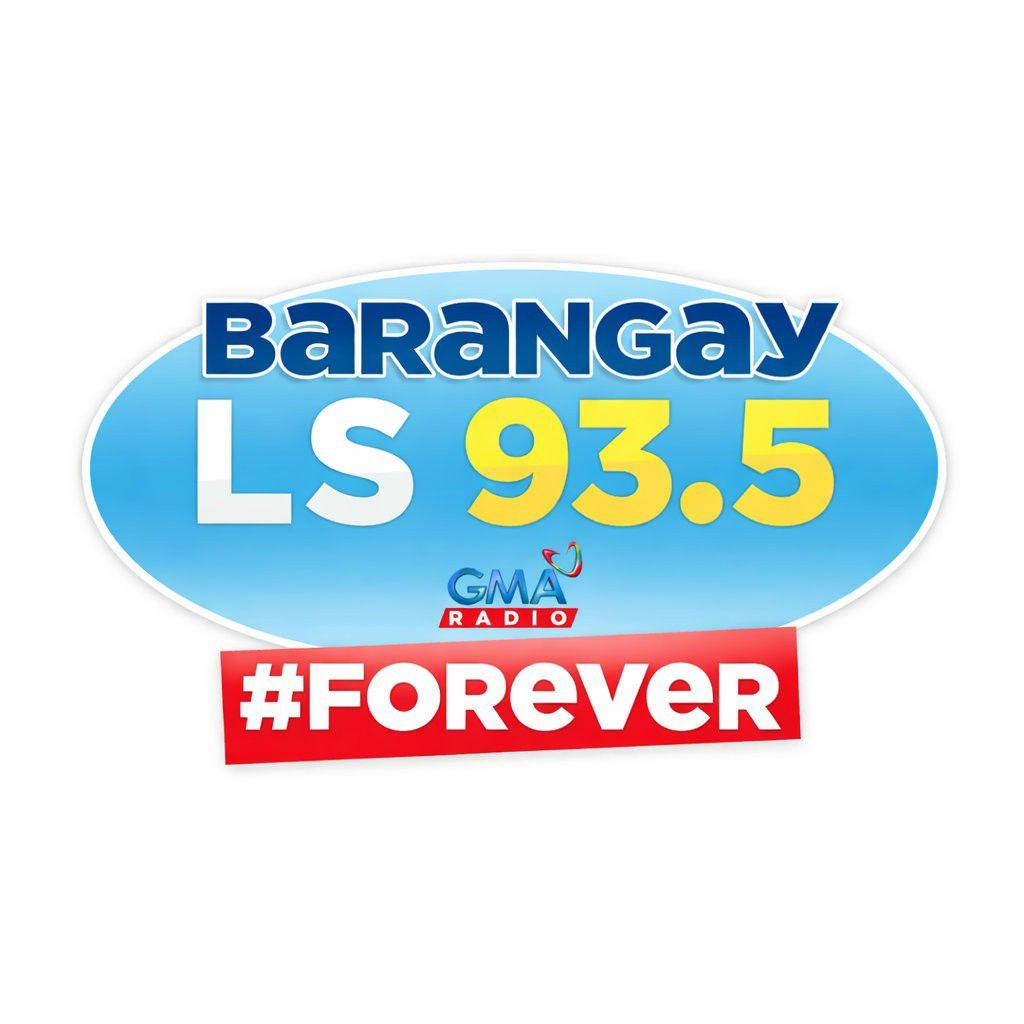
- Dagupan; Philippines
- Broadcast area: Pangasinan and surrounding areas
- Frequency: 93.5 MHz
- Branding: Barangay LS 93.5

Programming
- Languages: Pangasinense, Filipino
- Format: Contemporary MOR, OPM
- Network: Barangay LS

Ownership
- Owner: GMA Network Inc.
- Sister stations: GMA TV-10 Pangasinan; GTV 22 Pangasinan; DZSD Super Radyo

History
- First air date: April 30, 1992
- Former names: Campus Radio (April 30, 1992–February 16, 2014)

Technical information
- Licensing authority: NTC
- Power: 10,000 watts
- ERP: 30,000 watts

Links
- Website: gmanetwork.com

Barangay FM 93.5 logo from 2023 to 2026

DWTL (93.5 FM), broadcasting as Barangay LS 93.5, is a radio station owned and operated by GMA Network Inc. The station's studio and transmitter are located at the GMA Complex, Claveria Rd., Brgy. Malued, Dagupan.

== History ==
The station was established on April 30, 1992 as Campus Radio 93.5. It carried the slogan "Forever". On February 17, 2014, as part of RGMA's brand unification, the station rebranded as Barangay 93.5 and carried-over the slogan "Isang Bansa, Isang Barangay". Following the launch, it began simulcasting a handful of programs from its flagship station in Manila. In 2019, the station adapted its tagline "Ayos!", which was used by several Campus Radio stations. On April 5, 2026, the station adapted the Barangay LS branding from its flagship station.
