= Peñarrubia, Abra =

Municipality in Abra, Philippines

Peñarrubia Patoc
- Municipality
- Municipality of Peñarrubia
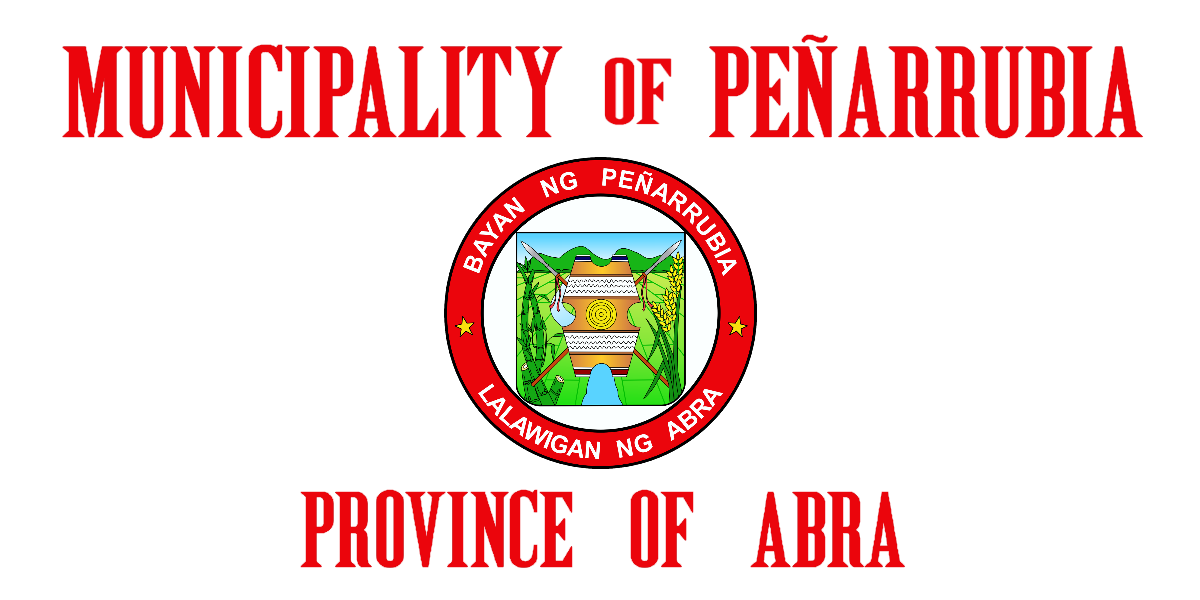
- Flag Seal

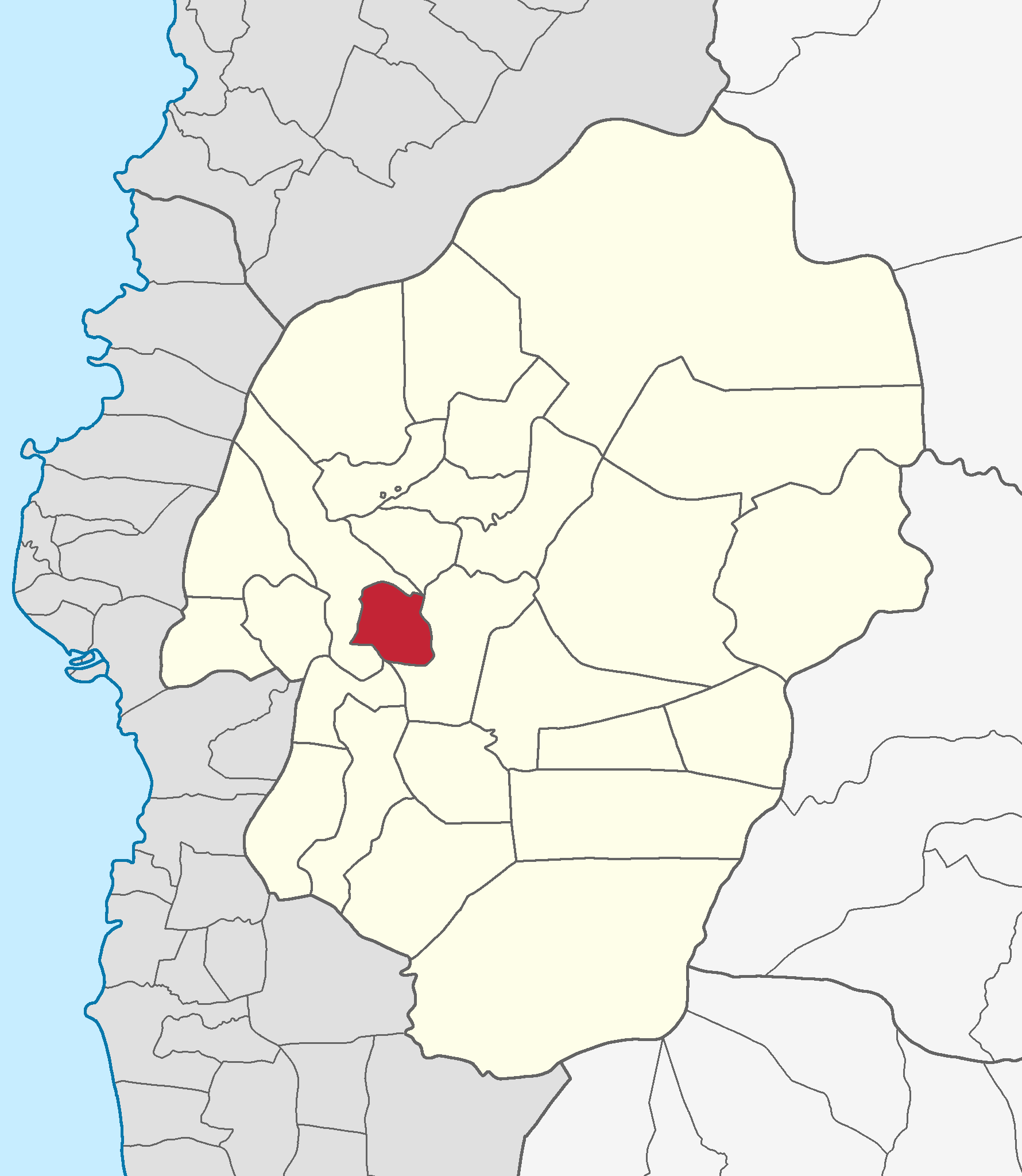
- Map of Abra with Peñarrubia highlighted
- Interactive map of Peñarrubia
- Location within the Philippines
- Coordinates: 17°34′N 120°39′E
- Country: Philippines
- Region: Cordillera Administrative Region
- Province: Abra
- District: Lone district
- Founded: 1917
- Named for: Peñarrubia, Málaga, Spain
- Barangays: 9 (see Barangays)

Government
  - Type: Sangguniang Bayan
  - Mayor: Geraldine M. Balbuena
  - Vice Mayor: Laura M. Ramirez
  - Representative: Joseph Santo Niño B. Bernos
  - Municipal Council: Members: Delia S. Bringas; Valeriano V. Damasen Jr.; Emmalyn O. Quelnan; Arturo L. Ferrandiz Jr.; Ruben M. Amboni; Decimia D. Cabang; Jezza S. Benabese; Perlita G. Valencia
  - Electorate: 5,145 voters (2025)

Area
  - Total: 38.29 km^{2} (14.78 sq mi)
- Elevation: 129 m (423 ft)
- Highest elevation: 567 m (1,860 ft)
- Lowest elevation: 30 m (98 ft)

Population (2024 census)
  - Total: 7,003
  - Density: 182.9/km^{2} (473.7/sq mi)
  - Households: 1,672

Economy
  - Income class: 4th municipal income class
  - Poverty incidence: 10.27% (2023)
  - Revenue: ₱ 113.6 million (2024)
  - Assets: ₱ 587.3 million (2024)
  - Expenditure: ₱ 84.36 million (2024)
  - Liabilities: ₱ 54.42 million (2024)

Service provider
  - Electricity: Abra Electric Cooperative (ABRECO)
- Time zone: UTC+8 (PST)
- ZIP code: 2804
- PSGC: 1400117000
- IDD : area code: +63 (0)74
- Native languages: Itneg; Ilocano; Tagalog

Peñarrubia, officially the Municipality of Peñarrubia (Ilocano: Ili ti Peñarrubia; Tagalog: Bayan ng Peñarrubia), is a municipality in the province of Abra, Philippines. According to the 2024 census, it has a population of 7,003 people.

== Geography ==
The Municipality of Peñarrubia is located at 17°34′N 120°39′E. According to the Philippine Statistics Authority, the municipality has a land area of 39.19 square kilometres (15.13 sq mi) constituting 0.92% of the 4,165.25-square-kilometre- (1,608.21 sq mi) total area of Abra.

Peñarrubia is situated 7.22 kilometres (4.49 mi) from the provincial capital Bangued, and 408.19 kilometres (253.64 mi) from the country's capital city of Manila.

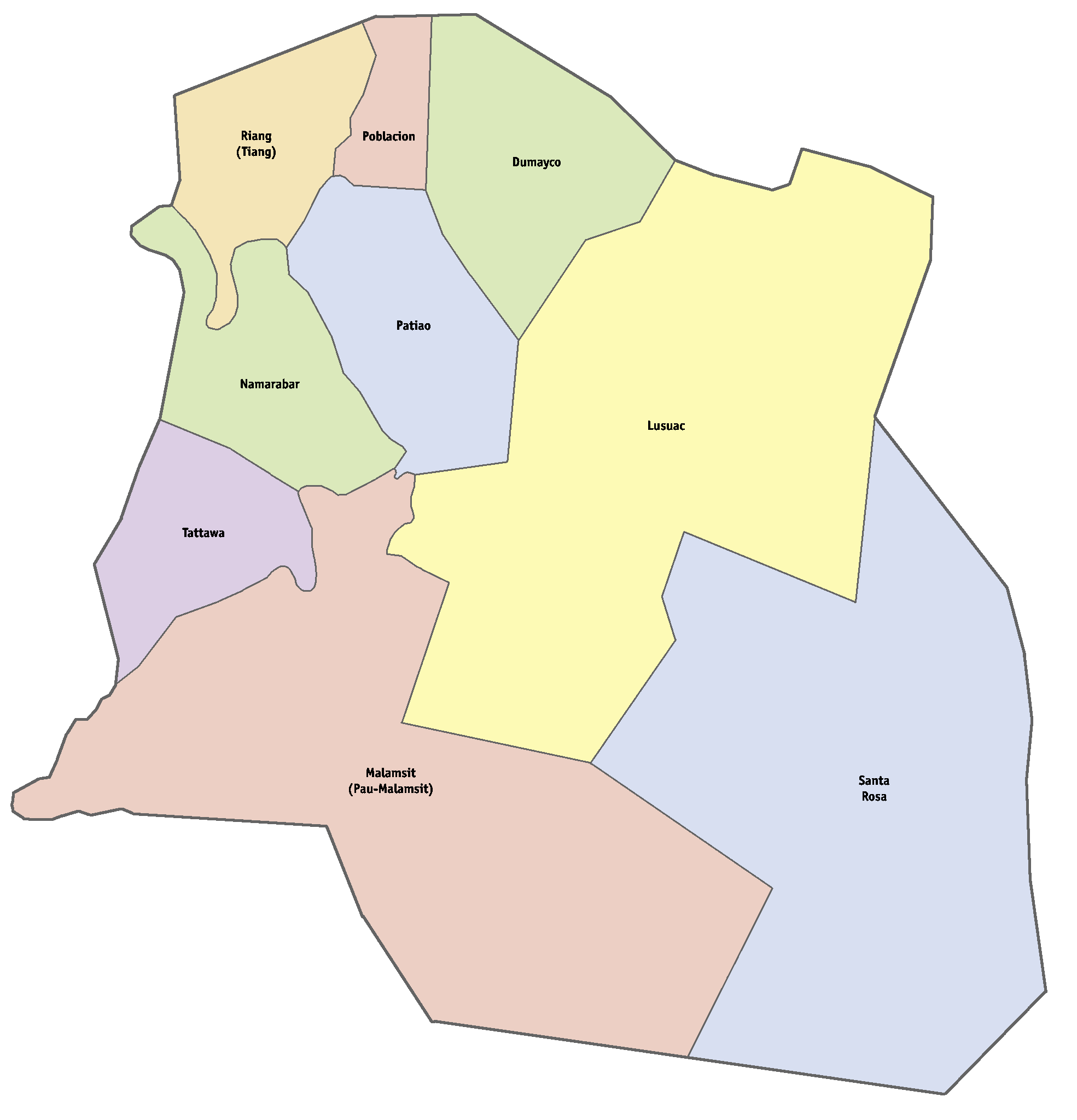
Political map of Peñarrubia

=== Barangays ===
Peñarrubia is politically subdivided into 9 barangays. Each barangay consists of puroks and some have sitios.

PSGC	Barangay	Population			±% p.a.	
		2024		2010		
140117001	Dumayco	16.8%	1,179	1,102	▴	0.47%
140117002	Lusuac	16.0%	1,121	1,053	▴	0.43%
140117005	Malamsit (Pau-Malamsit)	9.6%	675	640	▴	0.37%
140117003	Namarabar	9.6%	675	548	▴	1.45%
140117004	Patiao	10.5%	738	608	▴	1.35%
140117006	Poblacion	13.2%	924	994	▾	−0.50%
140117007	Riang (Tiang)	11.3%	793	810	▾	−0.15%
140117008	Santa Rosa	5.4%	375	382	▾	−0.13%
140117009	Tattawa	6.7%	471	407	▴	1.02%
	Total		7,003	6,544	▴	0.47%

=== Climate ===
Climate data for Peñarrubia, Abra
Month	Jan	Feb	Mar	Apr	May	Jun	Jul	Aug	Sep	Oct	Nov	Dec	Year
Mean daily maximum °C (°F)	29 (84)	30 (86)	32 (90)	33 (91)	32 (90)	31 (88)	30 (86)	30 (86)	30 (86)	30 (86)	30 (86)	29 (84)	31 (87)
Mean daily minimum °C (°F)	18 (64)	19 (66)	20 (68)	22 (72)	24 (75)	24 (75)	24 (75)	24 (75)	23 (73)	22 (72)	21 (70)	19 (66)	22 (71)
Average precipitation mm (inches)	9 (0.4)	11 (0.4)	13 (0.5)	23 (0.9)	92 (3.6)	122 (4.8)	153 (6.0)	137 (5.4)	139 (5.5)	141 (5.6)	42 (1.7)	14 (0.6)	896 (35.4)
Average rainy days	4.6	4.0	6.2	9.1	19.5	23.2	24.0	22.5	21.5	15.2	10.5	6.0	166.3
Source: Meteoblue

== Demographics ==
Population census of Peñarrubia
Year	Pop.	±% p.a.
1918	3,456	—
1939	2,295	−1.93%
1948	2,262	−0.16%
1960	3,117	+2.71%
1970	3,955	+2.41%
1975	3,737	−1.13%
1980	4,096	+1.85%
1990	4,893	+1.79%
1995	5,048	+0.59%
2000	5,515	+1.91%
2007	6,443	+2.17%
2010	6,544	+0.57%
2015	6,640	+0.28%
2020	6,951	+0.97%
2024	7,003	+0.18%
Source: Philippine Statistics Authority

In the 2024 census, Peñarrubia had a population of 7,003 people. The population density was 180 inhabitants per square kilometre (470/sq mi).

== Economy ==
Poverty incidence of Peñarrubia (%)

Source: Philippine Statistics Authority

The economy of Peñarrubia relies on crop production, aided by local infrastructure projects like farm-to-market roads to fast-track regional harvests. Another source of economy in Peñarrubia includes freshwater aquaculture ventures such as tilapia and catfish farming.

== Government ==
=== Local government ===
Peñarrubia, belonging to the lone congressional district of the province of Abra, is governed by a mayor designated as its local chief executive and by a municipal council as its legislative body in accordance with the Local Government Code. The mayor, vice mayor, and the councilors are elected directly by the people through an election which is being held every three years.

=== Elected officials ===
Members of the Municipal Council (2025–2028)
Position	Name
Congressman	Joseph Santo Niño B. Bernos
Mayor	Geraldine M. Balbuena
Vice-Mayor	Laura M. Ramirez
Councilors	Delia S. Bringas
Councilors	Valeriano V. Damasen, Jr.
Councilors	Emmalyn O. Quelnan
Councilors	Ruben M. Amboni
Councilors	Jezza S. Benabese
Councilors	Arturo L. Ferrandiz, Jr.
Councilors	Decimia D. Cabang
Councilors	Perlita G. Valencia

Antonio Amasi Domes-ag was OIC Mayor of the town in 1989–1992, then elected as mayor in 1992–1995, and again for the term 1995–1998. He was replaced by his wife Lovelyn Domes-ag in 1998-2001 and 2001–2004. The election of 2004 became controversial in the whole nation when both husband and wife ran for mayoralty candidate. Antonio Domes-ag was proclaimed as the winner. In the May 2007 election, incumbent Vice Mayor Geraldine Mamsaang-Balbuena won in a matter of one vote against Antonio A. Domes-ag.

The present municipal mayor is Geraldine Mamsaang-Balbuena.

== Education ==
The Peñarrubia Schools District Office governs all educational institutions within the municipality. It oversees the management and operations of all private and public, from primary to secondary schools.

=== Primary and elementary schools ===
- Dumayco Primary School
- Lusuac Elementary School
- Malamsit Elementary School
- Namarabar Elementary School
- Sta. Rosa Elementary School
- Tattawa Primary School

=== Secondary school ===
- Peñarrubia Integrated School
