= List of GMA Network stations =

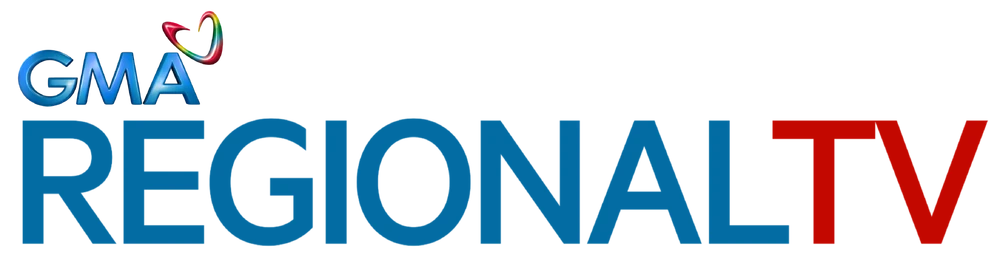
Logo of GMA Regional TV

The following is a list of television stations of GMA Network that are owned-and-operated by the network's namesake corporate parent.

== Current ==
=== Analog ===
Callsign	Branding	Channel	TPO	Location (Transmitter Site)	Coordinates
DZBB	GMA Manila	7 (VHF) (Note: Analog switch-off by January 15, 2027)	100 kW	Brgy. Culiat, Tandang Sora, Quezon City (Note: Flagship television station of GMA Network.)	14°40′12″N 121°3′0″E
DWAZ	GMA Batanes	7 (VHF)	0.1 kW	Brgy. Kayvaluganan, Basco, Batanes (Note: Relay station of GMA Benguet.)	20°27′3″N 121°58′17″E
D-5-AS	GMA Ilocos Norte	5 (VHF)	5 kW	Brgy. San Lorenzo, San Nicolas, Ilocos Norte (Note: Relay station and former semi-satellite station of GMA Benguet.)	18°8′34″N 120°35′9″E
DWBC	GMA Ilocos Sur	48 (UHF)	5 kW	Mt. Caniao, Bantay, Ilocos Sur (Note: Relay station of GMA Benguet and former originating and semi-satellite station.)	17°36′9″N 120°29′11″E
D-7-ZG	GMA Abra	7 (VHF)	1 kW	Brgy. Lusuac, Peñarrubia, Abra	17°33′18″N 120°40′20″E
DWBB	GMA Tuguegarao	7 (VHF)	1 kW	No. 91 Mabini St., Tuguegarao	17°36′35″N 121°43′29″E
DZBB	GMA Aparri	13 (VHF)	1 kW	Hi-Class Bldg., De Rivera St., Aparri	18°21′15″N 121°38′31″E
DZVG	GMA Mountain Province	5 (VHF)	10 kW	Mt. Amuyao, Barlig, Mountain Province	17°0′44″N 121°7′47″E
DWLE	GMA Isabela	7 (VHF)	2 kW	Heritage Bldg., Brgy. Malvar, Santiago, Isabela	16°41′18″N 121°33′3″E
DZEA	GMA Benguet	10 (VHF)	20 kW	Mt. Santo Tomas, Tuba, Benguet (Note: Originating station based in Dagupan, Pangasinan.)	16°20′7″N 120°33′40″E
D-5-ZB	GMA Baler	5 (VHF)	0.005 kW	Purok 3, Brgy. Buhangin, Baler, Aurora	15°46′6″N 121°33′32″E
DWNS	GMA Olongapo	10 (VHF)	0.2 kW	Upper Mabayuan, Olongapo	14°51′1″N 120°16′43″E
D-12-ZB	GMA Batangas	12 (VHF)	5 kW	Mt. Banoy, Batangas City (Note: Relay station)	13°42′21″N 121°10′21″E
DWJJ	GMA Jalajala	44 (UHF)	3 kW	Mt. Landing, Jalajala, Rizal	14°20′13″N 121°19′45″E
D-13-ZR	GMA Occidental Mindoro	13 (VHF)	2 kW	Bonifacio St., San Jose, Occidental Mindoro	12°21′16″N 121°3′54″E
DYPU	GMA Puerto Princesa	12 (VHF)	5 kW	Mitra Rd., Brgy. Sta. Monica, Puerto Princesa	9°48′0″N 118°44′4″E
DYAA	GMA Brooke's Point	6 (VHF)	0.1 kW	Brgy. Poblacion, Brooke's Point, Palawan	8°46′38″N 117°50′4″E
DWRF	GMA Coron	8 (VHF)	0.1 kW	Mt. Tapyas, Coron, Palawan	12°0′18″N 120°12′17″E
DWTR	GMA Romblon	7 (VHF)	10 kW	Triple Peak, Tablas Island, Romblon (Note: Relay station of GMA Iloilo.)	12°24′25″N 122°4′9″E
DYRD	GMA Masbate	7 (VHF)	1 kW	Brgy. Pinamurbuhan, Mobo, Masbate	12°20′40″N 123°38′29″E
DWAI	GMA Naga	7 (VHF)	30 kW	Concepcion Pequeña, Naga, Camarines Sur	13°37′10″N 123°11′51″E
DWLA	GMA Legazpi	12 (VHF)	10 kW	Mt. Bariw, Estanza, Legazpi, Albay	13°6′58″N 123°43′38″E
D-13-ZC	GMA Catanduanes	13 (VHF)	2 kW	Brgy. Sto. Niño, Virac, Catanduanes	13°36′25″N 124°13′52″E
DWGA	GMA Sorsogon	2 (VHF)	2 kW	Mt. Bintacan, Brgy. Maalo, Juban, Sorsogon	12°47′44″N 123°56′18″E
DWGC	GMA Daet	8 (VHF)	2 kW	Brgy. Mangcruz, Daet	14°5′49″N 122°57′19″E
DYBB	GMA Kalibo	2 (VHF)	1 kW	Brgy. Bulwang, Numancia, Aklan	11°43′5″N 122°21′41″E
DYAM	GMA Roxas	5 (VHF)	2 kW	Mission Hills, Brgy. Milibili, Roxas City	11°33′38″N 122°45′44″E
DYXX	GMA Iloilo	6 (VHF)	15 kW	Jordan, Guimaras (Note: Originating station based in Iloilo City.)	10°38′37″N 122°37′8″E
D-13-GM	GMA Bacolod	13 (VHF)	10 kW	iSecure Bldg., Rizal cor. Locsin St., Bacolod (Note: Semi-satellite of GMA Iloilo.)	10°40′9″N 122°56′56″E
DYGM	GMA Negros Occidental	30 (UHF)	40 kW	Mt. Canlandog, Murcia, Negros Occidental (Note: Relay station of GMA Iloilo.)	10°36′28″N 123°8′50″E
D-10-YA	GMA Sipalay	10 (VHF)	0.01 kW	Old Sipalay City Hall, Sipalay	9°44′55″N 122°24′14″E
DYSS	GMA Cebu	7 (VHF)	50 kW	Mt. Bonbon, Brgy. Babag 2, Cebu City (Note: Originating station)	10°21′49″N 123°51′13″E
D-5-YB	GMA Dumaguete	5 (VHF)	1 kW	Brgy. Palinpinon, Valencia, Negros Oriental (Note: Relay station of GMA Cebu.)	9°18′23″N 123°13′50″E
D-11-YE	GMA Bohol	11 (VHF)	2 kW	Banat-i Hills, Brgy. Bool, Tagbilaran	9°37′59″N 123°52′59″E
DYCL	GMA Tacloban	10 (VHF)	5 kW	Mt. Canlais, Brgy. Basper, Tacloban	11°14′38″N 124°57′59″E
DYIL	GMA Ormoc	12 (VHF)	1 kW	Brgy. Alta Vista, Ormoc	11°0′29″N 124°36′54″E
DYAS	GMA Calbayog	5 (VHF)	1 kW	San Mateo St., Brgy. Matobato, Calbayog	12°4′1″N 124°34′52″E
DYVB	GMA Borongan	8 (VHF)	1 kW	Circumferential Rd., Poblacion, Borongan	11°37′9″N 125°25′57″E
DXJC	GMA Cagayan De Oro	35 (UHF)	10 kW	Malasag Heights, Brgy. Cugman, Cagayan de Oro (Note: Semi-satellite of GMA Davao and former originating station.)	8°27′9″N 124°42′12″E
DXMK	GMA Bukidnon	12 (VHF)	10 kW	Mt. Kitanglad, Bukidnon (Note: Relay station of GMA Davao.)	8°08′23″N 124°54′59″E
D-4-XT	GMA Dipolog	4 (VHF)	1 kW	Linabo Peak, Dipolog	8°35′20″N 123°23′31″E
DXGM	GMA Ozamiz	5 (VHF)	1 kW	Bukagan Hill, Brgy. Malaubang, Ozamiz	8°8′14″N 123°49′18″E
DXEJ	GMA Pagadian	3 (VHF)	1 kW	Mt. Palpalan, Pagadian	7°50′25″N 123°22′55″E
DXRV	GMA Iligan	11 (VHF)	2 kW	Circumferential Rd., Brgy. Del Carmen, Iligan	8°13′48″N 124°15′47″E
DXBM	GMA Butuan	26 (UHF)	5 kW	Mayapay Hills, Butuan	8°53′6″N 125°29′11″E
D-10-XA	GMA Surigao	10 (VHF)	1 kW	Brgy. Lipata, Surigao City	9°48′16″N 125°27′11″E
DXRC	GMA Tandag	2 (VHF)	1 kW	Capitol Hill, Brgy. Telaje, Tandag	9°4′2″N 126°11′44″E
DXMJ	GMA Davao	5 (VHF)	25 kW	Shrine Hills, Matina, Davao City	7°4′24″N 125°34′33″E
DXBG	GMA General Santos	8 (VHF)	10 kW	Nuñez St., Brgy. San Isidro, General Santos (Note: Semi-satellite of GMA Davao.)	6°8′19″N 125°10′45″E
DXLA	GMA Zamboanga	9 (VHF)	5 kW	Brgy. Cabatangan, Zamboanga City	6°56′59″N 122°3′23″E
DXNS	GMA Cotabato	12 (VHF)	1 kW	Brgy. Rosary Heights V, Cotabato City	7°12′40″N 124°15′1″E
DXLS	GMA Jolo	12 (VHF)	0.1 kW	Ynawat Bldg., Hadji-Butu St., Jolo, Sulu	6°2′59″N 120°59′58″E

=== Digital ===
Callsign	Branding	UHF Channel	Frequency	TPO	Location (Transmitter Site)	Coordinates	Test broadcast since
DZBB	GMA Manila	15	479.143 MHz	15 kW	Brgy. Culiat, Tandang Sora, Quezon City	14°40′12″N 121°3′0″E	May 2019 (Note: Originally test-broadcast using UHF Ch. 27 (DWDB-TV) from February 2013 to June 2019.)
DZBB	GMA Manila	15	479.143 MHz	10 kW	PBCom Tower, 6795 Ayala Ave. cor. V.A. Rufino St., Makati (Note: Single-frequency network (SFN) relay station.)	14°33′31″N 121°1′10″E	January 2022
DZBB	GMA Manila	15	479.143 MHz	15 kW	Sumulong Hi-way, Brgy. Sta. Cruz, Antipolo	14°36′49″N 121°9′22″E	August 2023
DZBB	GMA Manila	15	479.143 MHz	3 kW	Zen Towers, 1108 Natividad A. Lopez St., Ermita, Manila	14°35′26″N 120°59′3″E	August 2023
DZBB	GMA Manila	15	479.143 MHz	5 kW	Sto. Enterro St., Brgy. Pulungbulu, Angeles City	15°8′9″N 120°36′17″E	August 2023
DZBB	GMA Manila	15	479.143 MHz	3 kW	Luz St., Brgy. Dionisio S. Garcia, Cabanatuan	15°28′18″N 120°58′15″E	May 2024
DZBB	GMA Manila	15	479.143 MHz	3 kW	Brgy. Mabolo, Malolos	14°50′11″N 120°49′36″E	September 2024
DZBB	GMA Manila	15	479.143 MHz	5 kW	Mt. Landing, Jalajala, Rizal	14°20′13″N 121°19′44″E	May 2024
D-5-AS	GMA Ilocos Norte	24	533.143 MHz	10 kW	Brgy. San Lorenzo, San Nicolas, Ilocos Norte	18°8′34″N 120°35′9″E	October 2023
DWBC	GMA Ilocos Sur	15	479.143 MHz	5 kW	Mt. Caniao, Bantay, Ilocos Sur	17°36′9″N 120°29′11″E	February 2021
DZVG	GMA Mountain Province	29	563.143 MHz	10 kW	Mt. Amuyao, Barlig, Mountain Province	17°0′44″N 121°7′47″E	March 2023
DWLE	GMA Isabela	15	479.143 MHz	5 kW	Heritage Bldg., Maharlika Hi-way, Brgy. Malvar, Santiago, Isabela	16°41′18″N 121°33′3″E	October 2023
DZEA	GMA Benguet	38	617.143 MHz	15 kW	Mt. Santo Tomas, Tuba, Benguet	16°20′7″N 120°33′40″E	May 2018
DZEA	GMA Benguet	38	617.143 MHz	3 kW	Luz St., Brgy. Dionisio S. Garcia, Cabanatuan	15°28′18″N 120°58′15″E	May 2024
DWNS	GMA Olongapo	38	617.143 MHz	5 kW	Upper Mabayuan, Olongapo	14°51′1″N 120°16′43″E	May 2023
D-12-ZB	GMA Batangas	32	581.143 MHz	5 kW	Mt. Banoy, Batangas City	13°42′21″N 121°10′21″E	October 2019
D-12-ZB	GMA Batangas	32	581.143 MHz	5 kW	Brgy. San Jose, San Pablo, Laguna	14°3′42″N 121°20′25″E	June 2023
D-13-ZR	GMA Occidental Mindoro	15	479.143 MHz	2 kW	Bonifacio St., San Jose, Occidental Mindoro	12°21′16″N 121°3′54″E	April 2024
DYPU	GMA Puerto Princesa	15	479.143 MHz	5 kW	Mitra Rd., Brgy. Sta. Monica, Puerto Princesa	9°48′0″N 118°44′4″E	July 2024
DWAI	GMA Naga	38	617.143 MHz	10 kW	Concepcion Pequeña, Naga, Camarines Sur	13°37′11″N 123°11′51″E	November 2021
DWLA	GMA Legazpi	41	635.143 MHz	10 kW	Mt. Bariw, Estanza, Legazpi, Albay	13°6′58″N 123°43′38″E	September 2022
DYAM	GMA Roxas	15	479.143 MHz	5 kW	Mission Hills, Brgy. Milibili, Roxas City	11°33′38″N 122°45′44″E	January 2024
DYXX	GMA Iloilo	29	563.143 MHz	10 kW	Jordan, Guimaras (Note: Originating station with alternate transmission facilities at Alta Tierra Subdivision, Jaro, Iloilo City.)	10°38′37″N 122°37′8″E	August 2021
D-13-GM	GMA Bacolod	44	653.143 MHz	10 kW	iSecure Building, Rizal corner Locsin St., Bacolod	10°40′9″N 122°56′56″E	May 2021
DYGM	GMA Negros Occidental	15	479.143 MHz	5 kW	Mt. Canlandog, Murcia, Negros Occidental	10°36′28″N 123°8′50″E	June 2022
DYGM	GMA Negros Occidental	15	479.143 MHz	1 kW	Brgy. Tiglawigan, Cadiz, Negros Occidental	10°55′33″N 123°21′27″E	August 2024
DYSS	GMA Cebu	26	545.143 MHz	10 kW	Mt. Bonbon, Brgy. Babag 2, Cebu City	10°21′49″N 123°51′13″E	May 2018
D-5-YB	GMA Dumaguete	22	521.143 MHz	1 kW	Brgy. Palinpinon, Valencia, Negros Oriental	9°18′23″N 123°13′50″E	September 2023
DYCL	GMA Tacloban	34	593.143 MHz	10 kW	Mt. Canlais, Brgy. Basper, Tacloban	11°14′38″N 124°57′59″E	December 2021
DXDZ	GMA Cagayan De Oro	47	671.143 MHz	10 kW	Malasag Heights, Brgy. Cugman, Cagayan de Oro	8°27′9″N 124°42′12″E	December 2020
DXMK	GMA Bukidnon	44	653.143 MHz	10 kW	Mt. Kitanglad, Bukidnon	8°8′23″N 124°54′59″E	April 2023
D-4-XT	GMA Dipolog	15	479.143 MHz	1 kW	Linabo Peak, Dipolog	8°35′20″N 123°23′31″E	July 2024
DXRV	GMA Iligan	33	587.143 MHz	5 kW	Circumferential Rd., Brgy. Del Carmen, Iligan	8°13′48″N 124°15′47″E	May 2023
DXBM	GMA Butuan	15	479.143 MHz	5 kW	Mayapay Hills, Butuan	8°53′6″N 125°29′11″E	February 2023
DXMJ	GMA Davao	37	611.143 MHz	15 kW	Shrine Hills, Matina, Davao City	7°4′24″N 125°34′33″E	June 2018
DXBG	GMA General Santos	34	593.143 MHz	10 kW	Nuñez St., Brgy. San Isidro, General Santos	6°8′19″N 125°10′45″E	December 2021
DXLA	GMA Zamboanga	41	635.143 MHz	10 kW	Brgy. Cabatangan, Zamboanga City	6°56′59″N 122°3′23″E	October 2022

=== Digital Main and Subchannels ===
==== GMA Manila ====
Channel	Video	Aspect	Short name	Programming	Note
7.01	480i	4:3	GMA	GMA	Commercial broadcast
7.02	480i	4:3	GTV	GTV	Commercial broadcast
7.03	480i	4:3	HEART OF ASIA	Heart of Asia	Commercial broadcast
7.06	480i	4:3	I HEART MOVIES	I Heart Movies	Commercial broadcast
7.07	480i	4:3	(UNNAMED)	Reserved Channel	Color bars
7.08	480i	4:3	(UNNAMED)	Reserved Channel	Color bars
7.11	480i	4:3	(UNNAMED)	Reserved Channel	Color bars
7.21	240p	4:3	GMA 1-Seg	GMA	1seg broadcast

==== Originating and Relay stations ====
Channel	Video	Aspect	Short name	Programming	Note
XX.01	480i	4:3	GMA	GMA	Commercial broadcast
XX.02	480i	4:3	GTV	GTV	Commercial broadcast
XX.03	480i	4:3	HEART OF ASIA	Heart of Asia	Commercial broadcast
XX.06	480i	4:3	I HEART MOVIES	I Heart Movies	Commercial broadcast
XX.21	240p	4:3	GMA 1-Seg	GMA	1seg

== Defunct/inactive ==
Callsign	Channel	Location
D-7-ZH	7	Ilagan
D-5-ZR	5	Bayombong
D-5-ZC	5	Iba, Zambales
DWGD	44	Naga, Camarines Sur (Note: Owned by RGMA Network, Inc.)
DWGE	33	Legazpi, Albay
D-8-ZA	8	Malilipot
D-8-ZG	8	Camalig
DYGC	51	Cebu City
D-11-YC	11	Samboan
D-11-YD	11	Barili
DXGP	45	Zamboanga City
DXDZ	12	Cagayan de Oro
DXGE	32	General Santos

== See also ==
- List of GMA Network radio stations
- List of GTV stations
- List of analog television stations in the Philippines
- List of digital television stations in the Philippines
- List of Philippine television networks
- List of Philippine media companies
