= 24 Oras Ilokano =

- Also known as: Balitang Ilokano
- Genre: News broadcasting
- Presented by: Jorge Guerrero
- Country of origin: Philippines
- Original language: Ilocano

Production
- Running time: 30-45 minutes
- Production company: GMA News and Public Affairs

Original release
- Network: GMA Ilocos
- Release: June 25, 2012 – April 24, 2015

24 Oras Ilokano, formerly Balitang Ilokano is a Philippine television news broadcasting program broadcast by GMA Network in the Ilocos Region. Anchored by Jorge Guerrero, it premiered on June 25, 2012. The newscast concluded on April 24, 2015.

== Overview ==
The program delivers news and current events coming from the Ilocos provinces and Abra. It was initially aired live weekdays from GMA Ilocos studios in San Vicente, Ilocos Sur and was simulcasted on TV-5 Ilocos Norte and TV-7 Abra.

== History ==
=== 2012-2014: As Balitang Ilokano ===
Premiered on June 25, 2012, the newscast began airing weeks after the launch of GMA Ilocos. Former Balitang Amianan anchor Jorge Guerrero returned to his hometown in Ilocos just to anchor the said news program.

=== 2014-2015: As 24 Oras Ilokano and Aftermath ===
Following the changes on its now-main newscast 24 Oras, Balitang Ilokano was rebranded as 24 Oras Ilokano since November 10, 2014.

The newscast suddenly got canceled after almost three years of broadcast (next to GMA Bicol's 24 Oras Bikol, formerly Baretang Bikol, which aired three months later in September 2012) due to the strategic streamlining that happened to all provincial stations of the network. Following the cancellation was the retrenchment of its staff and personalities and the closure of the network's regional news department.

GMA Ilocos would not have a regional newscast until a year later when it became a part of GMA Regional TV One North Central Luzon (previously 24 Oras Amianan and Balitang Amianan).

== Area of Coverage ==
- Laoag City and Ilocos Norte
- Vigan City and Ilocos Sur
- Bangued and Abra
- Batac
- Candon City

== Final anchor ==
- Jorge Guerrero

== Final reporters ==
- Brigette Mayor
- Argie Lorenzo
- Zion Palacay
- Mark Masudog
- Manny Morales

== Former reporters ==
- Ivy Hernando
- Zenna Nacino
- Kyro Palisoc
- Franzes Ivy Carasi
