= DZRH-TV =

- Metro Manila; Philippines
- Channels: Analog: 11 (VHF)
- Branding: MBC 11 Manila

Ownership
- Owner: MBC Media Group

History
- First air date: April 11, 1962
- Last air date: September 23, 1972 (martial law)
- Call sign meaning: Radio Heacock (former branding)

Technical information
- ERP: 50,000 watts

DZRH-TV was the flagship VHF TV station of Philippine media network Manila Broadcasting Company. It aired from April 11, 1962 to September 23, 1972, and had relay stations in six key cities in the Philippines. Its studios were located in the Jai Alai Building. It was shut down permanently during the martial law decreed by President Ferdinand Marcos.

== History ==
=== Pioneer operators (1962–1972) ===
On April 11, 1962, at 7:30 pm, the Manila Broadcasting Company (MBC), through its subsidiary, the Metropolitan Broadcasting Company, launched DZRH-TV on VHF channel 11, owned by the Elizalde family. On January 9, 1972, MBC inaugurated its new building for the TV station. President Ferdinand Marcos attended the ceremony. However, a few months later on September 23, 1972, the government forced the TV station along with DZRH AM 650 and other assets of the company to cease operations in the wake of Marcos' declaration of martial law. The status of the pre-martial law program archives of channel 11 is unknown.

=== Failed bid of restoration ===
After the 1986 People Power Revolution, MBC attempted to bring it back on the air; however in January 1992, the NTC disqualified them for a VHF frequency application because the agency found MBC "not legally, technically and financially qualified to operate the station". As a result, the license was eventually acquired by El Shaddai-led Delta Broadcasting System, Inc. in 1995, with the frequency's new callsign DWXI-TV. DBS later moved to channel 35, when ZOE Broadcasting Network head and Jesus Is Lord Church leader Brother Eddie Villanueva bought channel 11 from DBS in 1998 and created DZOE-TV, which was occupied by GMA Network's subsidiary Citynet to air GMA News TV (formerly ZOE TV and QTV/Q; now known as GTV) from 2005 to 2019. It discontinued operations on June 5, 2019, because the blocktime agreement between ZOE Broadcasting Network and GMA was not renewed. As a result, GMA News TV moved to DWDB-TV Channel 27 (renamed as GTV on February 22, 2021), for the remainder of the analog transmission run. Channel 11 became affiliated with ABS-CBN as A2Z, 5 months after channel 2's shutdown due to a cease and desist order issued by the National Telecommunications Commission for an expired franchise on May 5, 2020, and their frequencies were later recalled, with channel 2's frequency taken over by AMBS' All TV.

Ironically, MBC was one of the two remaining pre-Martial Law TV operators who did not revive at the height of the sequestrations months after the 1986 Revolution, along with ABC-5. It relaunched in 1991 with different calls, DWET-TV; and a different corporate name, Associated Broadcasting Company.

MBC returned to TV, albeit on cable as TV Natin in 2007 branded as DZRH News Television.

=== Proposed plan of revival on digital television ===
In February 2024, MBC Media Group revealed plans to revive the station, this time on Digital Terrestrial Television, as the company ventures into multimedia. It became initially available in Visayas Region (Bacolod, Iloilo, Cebu only) under Test Broadcast phase. It has yet to start digital TV operations in Mega Manila and nearby provinces after it obtained a provisional authority from the NTC.

== Programming ==
=== Original programming ===
- Aking Talaarawan
- Ano Ang Balita (1962–1972)
- Balitang Barbero (1965)
- Bobo, The Hobo
- Catch Up with Tirso (1970–1972)
- Cinema 11
- Classroom TV
- Club 11
- Dalawang Daigdig
- Dateline News
- Darigold Jamboree
- Defend Yourself
- DJ Dance Time
- Etcetera, Etcetera (sitcom) (1967)
- Etchos Lang (Justo Justo)
- Filipino Movies
- Film Feature
- Film Program
- Fistorama
- Gabi ng Lagim (TV version) (1962–1972)
- Industry on Parade
- Japanese Film
- MBC Reports
- Medical Center
- MICAA on MBC
- Nelda
- People Want to Know
- Pinilakang Tabing
- Platters and Patterns
- Praybet Detektib
- Reyna ng Tahanan
- Sa Kanilang Ibayo
- Sa Labis ng Baryo
- Salute to Flight
- Show Business
- Si Lolo at Si Lola (1962–1963)
- Sneak Preview
- Spanish Film
- Spell to Win
- Straight from the Shoulder (1970–1972)
- Tagalog Movies
- Tanghalan Pilipino
- Tayo'y Mag-Hapi-Hapi
- The 11th Hour News
- The Big Show
- The Bong Lapira Show
- The Joe Quirino Show
- The Nite Owl Dance Party
- The Week that Was
- Tindahan sa Nayon
- TV Wonderland
- Your Esso Reporter (1962–1972)

=== Acquired programming ===
American

- Amazing Miss
- Christie Comedies
- Crusader
- Fisherman and the Fish
- King of Diamond (1963–1964)
- Mickey
- Suspense
- The Adventures of Wild Bill Hickok
- The Cisco Kid
- The Green Hornet
- The Man from U.N.C.L.E.
- The Man Who Never Was
- The New Breed
- The Teenagers
- The Time Tunnel
- The Young Rebels

Biritsh

- Stingray

Cartoons

- Crusader Rabbit

Chinese

- Chinese Hour

Japanese

- Phantom Agents

Sports

- Auto Racing
- Fight Night
- Gillette Cavalcade of Sports
- International Football
- Top Pro Golf

Others

- Blue Light
- Knock on Wood
- Magic Shoes with the Aldeguers
- Pentecostal Outpouring
- Sonny Sings and Swings
- Vibrations
- Worker's Forum

== See also ==
- ZOE TV 11
- MBC Media Group
- DZRH
- DZRH News Television
- List of MBC Media Group stations
