= DZOZ-DTV =

Light TV (DZOZ-DTV)
- Metro Manila; Philippines
- City: Pasig
- Channels: Digital: 33 (UHF) (ISDB-T); Virtual: 33.01
- Branding: Light TV 33 Manila

Programming
- Subchannels: 33.01: Light TV; 33.02: Light TV SD1
- Affiliations: Light TV (Independent)

Ownership
- Owner: ZOE Broadcasting Network
- Sister stations: DZOE-TV (A2Z); Radyo Calabarzon 1458; DWZB 91.1 FM Palawan

History
- Founded: May 1, 2006 (as UniversiTV 33); March 10, 2008 (as ZOE TV 33/ZTV 33); March 1, 2011 (as Light TV; 1st incarnation); March 31, 2014 (as Light Network); February 12, 2018 (as Light TV; 2nd incarnation)
- Former call signs: DZJV-TV (2006); DZOZ-TV (2006–2017)
- Former channel numbers: Analog: 11 (VHF, 1998–2005) 33 (UHF, 2006–2017)
- Former affiliations: Independent (2006–2008)
- Call sign meaning: Variant of sister station DZOE-TV

Technical information
- Licensing authority: NTC
- Power: Digital: 5 kW TPO; 25 kW ERP
- Transmitter coordinates: 14°34′37″N 121°10′5″E
- Translator(s): DWDZ-TV 33 Puerto Princesa

Links
- Website: lighttv.ph

DZOZ-DTV (channel 33) is a digital-only television station in Metro Manila, Philippines, serving as the flagship outlet of the Light TV network. Owned and operated by ZOE Broadcasting Network, it operates alongside A2Z flagship station DZOE-TV (channel 11), which is managed by ABS-CBN Corporation under a blocktime agreement. The station shares its studios and broadcast facilities with DZOE-TV on the 22nd floor of the Strata 2000 Building along Emerald Avenue in Ortigas Center, Pasig. Its hybrid digital transmitting facilities is situated at Crestview Heights Subdivision in Barangay San Roque, Antipolo, Rizal. Both technical and operational resources are jointly utilized with DZOE-TV (channel 11).

== Channel history ==
Before 2006, ZOE Broadcasting Network operated as an independent station on VHF Channel 11 in Metro Manila. The network acquired the channel in 1998 from Delta Broadcasting System following a settlement. By 2005, ZOE entered a lease agreement with Citynet Network Marketing and Productions, Inc. (a subsidiary of GMA Network, Inc.), granting Citynet full control of ZOE-TV Channel 11 in exchange for airing ZOE-produced programs on GMA's schedule and upgrading its transmitter facility at the GMA Tower of Power in Quezon City. The partnership ended on June 4, 2019, after GMA cited rising lease costs in its 2018 financial report, prompting Channel 11 to cease operations the next day. The channel resumed broadcasting in June 2020 from a new transmitter in Antipolo, becoming the primary terrestrial carrier for ABS-CBN Corporation's programming following the latter’s franchise expiration in May 2020. It rebranded as A2Z in October 2020.

ZOE Broadcasting Network initiated test broadcasts on UHF Channel 33 in May 2006, airing limited programs like the job-search show Future Finder ahead of its formal relaunch as DZOZ-TV on November 27, 2006. The relaunch followed a blocktime agreement with Makati-based Estima, Inc., resulting in the launch of UniversiTV, a student-oriented channel featuring evening and overnight programming. Initially airing from 4:00 p.m. to 8:00 a.m., UniversiTV later reduced its broadcast hours to 4:00 a.m. before ceasing operations on March 10, 2008, due to low ratings and advertiser disinterest. ZOE temporarily filled the schedule with entertainment programs and a morning news show under the ZTV 33 brand, while UniversiTV transitioned to a pay-TV format before shutting down entirely by 2010.

On March 1, 2011—one day after ZOE's sister station Channel 11 relaunched as GMA News TV, seen on Channel 27 until 2021; which is now known as (GTV)—Channel 33 rebranded as Light TV 33, debuting original programming such as the flagship newscast News Light. The channel shifted toward religious content, and on March 31, 2014, it was renamed Light Network under the slogan "Experience Light" while retaining its tagline "Kaibigan Mo" (Your Friend).

Light Network reverted to Light TV on February 12, 2018, adopting the slogan "God’s Channel of Blessings", which was later dropped on December 15, 2025. It introduced live broadcasts of JIL Worship Services on Sunday mornings (later simulcast on A2Z Channel 11 starting November 1, 2020) and Jesus the Healer Friday Night Healing Services.

On March 4, 2019, Light TV launched Light TV Radio, a radio-on-television format featuring Daylight Devotions, News Light sa Umaga, and Bangon na Pilipinas, followed by Edge TV. These programs were streamed on Light TV’s Facebook page and simulcast on radio stations DZJV 1458 kHz (Laguna) and DWZB 91.1 FM (Palawan). Edge TV also streamed independently via its own Facebook page. After the launch of UCAPehan on October 5, 2019, the station adjusted its Saturday broadcast hours to 9:00 a.m. before further reducing them to 12:00 p.m. to 11:00 p.m. on January 4, 2020, following UCAPehan's final episode on December 28, 2019.

On July 6, 2020, Light TV temporarily shortened its broadcasting hours from 8:00 a.m. to 8:00 p.m. from Mondays to Saturdays and from 7:00 a.m. to 8:00 p.m. on Sundays due to the COVID-19 pandemic. However, its original broadcasting hours were reverted to the pre-pandemic broadcasting hours on May 5, 2025 with the premiere of the simulcast of Balitang A2Z from its sister channel, A2Z. Its broadcasting hours were extended once again on October 1, 2025, from 6:00 a.m. to 12:00 m.n. of the following day.

== Technical information ==
=== Digital channels ===
DZOZ-DTV operates on UHF Channel 33 (587.143 MHz) and broadcasts the following subchannels via multiplexing:

Channel	Video	Aspect	Short name	Programming	Note
33.01	1080i	16:9	Light TV	Light TV	Fully migrated from analog to digital/Configuration Testing
33.02	1080i	16:9	Light TV SD1	Light TV Promotional Channel	Fully migrated from analog to digital/Configuration Testing

=== Analog-to-digital conversion ===
On March 1, 2017, Light Network became the first television network in the Philippines to fully abandon analog transmissions and transition to digital broadcasting. The analog signal for Channel 33 was permanently shut down on the night of February 28, 2017, by then-chief engineer Antonio Soriano, marking the country's shift to all-digital television. The station immediately switched to its digital signal on the same frequency for post-transition operations.

In January 2022, the National Telecommunications Commission (NTC) granted ZOE Broadcasting Network provisional authority to utilize UHF Channel 20 as a single-frequency network (SFN) channel. Upon activation, DZOE-TV (A2Z) began using its second subchannel as a backup relay for DZOZ-DTV (Light TV) within Metro Manila to enhance signal coverage.

On December 15, 2025, DZOZ-DTV's feed and broadcast output switched to the 16:9 widescreen format to coincide with the launch of its refreshed logo.

== Areas of coverage ==
=== Primary areas ===
- Metro Manila
- Cavite
- Rizal
- Laguna
- Bulacan

==== Secondary areas ====
- Pampanga
- Batangas
- Quezon
- Portion of Bataan
- Portion of Tarlac
- Portion of Nueva Ecija

== See also ==
- ZOE Broadcasting Network
- DZOE-TV
- QTV/Q
- GMA News TV
- A2Z
