= DWDE-TV =

DBS TV-35 (DWDE-DTV)
- Metro Manila; Philippines
- City: Makati
- Channels: Digital: 35 (UHF) (ISDB-T)
- Branding: DBS TV-35 Manila

Programming
- Affiliations: El Shaddai

Ownership
- Owner: Delta Broadcasting System

History
- Founded: 1995; 31 years ago (Original); 2016; 10 years ago (Relaunch)
- First air date: TBA (Digital)
- Last air date: 2004; 22 years ago 2019; 7 years ago (Analog)
- Former call signs: DWXI-TV (1995–2004); DWDE-TV (2016-2019)
- Former channel numbers: Analog: 11 (VHF) (1995–1998); 35 (UHF) (1998–2004; 2016–2019)
- Call sign meaning: DElta

Technical information
- Licensing authority: NTC
- Power: 1 kW
- ERP: 5 kW

Links
- Website: Delta Official Site

DWDE-DTV, channel 35, is an upcoming UHF Digital television in the Philippines owned and operated by the Delta Broadcasting System, a company owned by El Shaddai servant leader Bro. Mike Z. Velarde. Its studios and transmitter are located at 8F Queensway Building, 118 Amorsolo St. Legaspi Village, Makati.

== History ==
Fourteen years after the launch of DWXI-AM 1314, El Shaddai leader Bro. Mike Z. Velarde established a television station on VHF Channel 11. The frequency, originally owned by MBC, is now used by A2Z under a blocktime agreement with ABS-CBN Corporation, while the former Channel 2 frequency is currently assigned to AMBS' All TV. DBS TV primarily aired religious programs, including El Shaddai. In 1998, ZOE Broadcasting Network, led by Jesus is Lord leader Eddie Villanueva, acquired Channel 11, prompting DBS TV to relocate to UHF Channel 35. By 2004, the station ceased operations due to low ratings and financial difficulties. However, El Shaddai events and programs continued to be broadcast on DWXI-AM.

On September 15, 2012, during the Weekly Family Appointment with El Shaddai at Amvel City, Velarde announced that DBS had acquired TV equipment for its planned return. On July 14, 2016, DBS TV-35 resumed test broadcasts, though with a weak signal that could only be received in parts of Cavite, Laguna, Batangas, and southern Metro Manila, airing past episodes of Family Appointment with El Shaddai. On December 4, 2016, during the 28th anniversary of El Shaddai DWXI PPFI Hong Kong Chapter, Velarde stated that the station was set to officially relaunch. However, the plan was postponed due to insufficient studio and transmitter facilities.

On April 30, 2019, Velarde announced that the station would transition to full digital terrestrial television after the Philippine Congress granted DBS a renewed franchise to maintain and operate broadcast stations in the country, which was signed into law by President Rodrigo Duterte. Despite this, the station remains inactive.

In 2019, DBS TV was ceased operations on Analog TV, and continue to watch DBS TV on YouTube and this website. But still not planned for Digital Terrestrial Television.

== Digital television ==
=== Digital channels ===
UHF Channel 35 (599.143 MHz)

Channel	Video	Aspect	Short Name	Programming	Note
35.01	1080i	16:9	DBS TV HD	El Shaddai	Test Broadcast
35.02	480i	4:3	DBS TV SD	El Shaddai	Test Broadcast
35.03	240p	4:3	DWXI 1314	DWXI 1314	Test Broadcast

== Online Streaming Service ==
El Shaddai is available on livestreaming via YouTube, and also on Delta Broadcasting System Website to watch online.

== See also ==
- DZOE-TV
- DWXI-AM
- Delta Broadcasting System
- El Shaddai (movement)
- Mike Velarde
