= DYXS-TV =

Television station in Sipalay City

DYXS-TV (A2Z Sipalay)
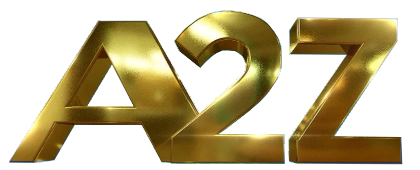

Sipalay, Negros Occidental; Philippines
- Channels: Analog: 38 (UHF)
- Branding: A2Z Sipalay

Programming
- Affiliations: A2Z

Ownership
- Owner: ZOE Broadcasting Network
- Operator: ABS-CBN Corporation (under blocktime agreement)

History
- Founded: 2010
- Former channel number: 26 (2010-2020)
- Former affiliations: ABS-CBN (2010-2020)
- Call sign meaning: EXtra Small (former branding)

Technical information
- ERP: 21.09 kilowatts

Links
- Website: A2Z Official Facebook Page

DYXS-TV is a commercial relay television station owned by ZOE Broadcasting Network. Its studio and transmitter are located at Barangay Manlucahoc, Sipalay, Negros Occidental.

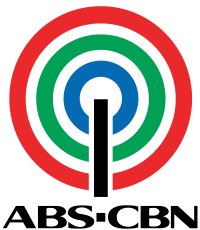
ABS-CBN Sipalay (2014-2020)

== See also ==
- DYEC-TV
- A2Z
- ZOE Broadcasting Network
