= DZOE-TV =

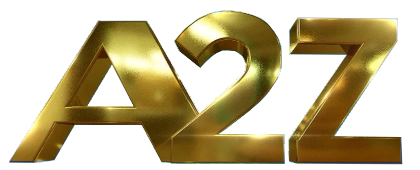
- Metro Manila; Philippines
- City: Quezon City, Pasig
- Channels: Analog: 11 (VHF) (until January 15, 2027; 58 days' time); Digital: 20 (UHF) (ISDB-T); Virtual: 11
- Branding: ZOE TV/A2Z TV-11 Manila

Programming
- Affiliations: 20.01: A2Z; 20.02: Light TV

Ownership
- Owner: ZOE Broadcasting Network
- Operator: ABS-CBN Corporation
- Sister stations: Through ABS-CBN: DZMV-TV (ALLTV / AMBS); DZMM (DZMM Radyo Patrol 630); DWFM (92.3 FM Radio); Kapamilya Channel; DWKC-DTV (Knowledge Channel and PRTV Prime Media); Through ZOE: DZOZ-DTV (Light TV); DZJV (Radyo Calabarzon 1458); DWZB (91.1 FM Palawan)

History
- Founded: April 13, 1998; 28 years ago
- Former call signs: DWXI-TV (1995–98)
- Former names: ZOE TV (1998–2005); QTV/Q (2005–2011); GMA News TV (2011–2020); Light TV (June–October 2020)
- Former affiliations: Independent (1995–2005); QTV/Q (2005–11); GMA News TV (2011–19); Dark (2019–20)
- Call sign meaning: ZOE Broadcasting Network

Technical information
- Licensing authority: NTC
- Power: Analog: 100 kW (50 kW on-operational power output); Digital: 5.5 kW
- ERP: Analog: 100 kW; Digital: 20 kW
- Transmitter coordinates: 14°34′37″N 121°10′5″E

DZOE-TV (VHF channel 11 Analog, UHF channel 20 Digital) is a television station in Metro Manila, Philippines, serving as the flagship of the A2Z network. Alongside Light TV flagship DZOZ-DTV channel 33, it is owned by ZOE Broadcasting Network, the broadcast media arm of the Jesus Is Lord Church. ABS-CBN Corporation, operates the station under an airtime lease agreement. The station's primary studios is at the ABS-CBN Broadcasting Center, Sgt. Esguerra Ave. corner Mo. Ignacia St., Diliman, Quezon City (which is the network's primary playout facility for most broadcasts through Kapamilya Channel except parts where A2Z's own playout feed independent from the former is used where a commercial break bumper for the network teasers is shown between the advertisements and resume of a program similar to ABS-CBN's 1986–2014 playout).

DZOE-TV maintains its secondary studios and main broadcast facilities at the 22nd floor, Strata 2000 Bldg., Emerald Avenue, Ortigas Center, Pasig, while its hybrid analog and digital transmitting facility is located at Crestview Heights Subdivision, Brgy. San Roque, Antipolo, Rizal (both are shared with Light TV Channel 33)

== History ==
=== Ownership Transition ===
The Channel 11 frequency (DWXI-TV Metro Manila) was initially granted to a joint venture between prominent Filipino religious leaders, Mike Velarde of the El Shaddai movement and Eddie Villanueva of the Jesus Is Lord Church (JIL).

However, disputes over control arose between Velarde and Villanueva, leading to both parties vying for full ownership. Through the intervention of the Philippine Congress, Villanueva and JIL ultimately secured the rights to the station. As part of the agreement, Villanueva's organization compensated Velarde's broadcast company, Delta Broadcasting System.

=== ZOE TV (1998–2005) ===
On April 13, 1998, the Jesus Is Lord (JIL) Church launched its own television network, ZOE TV. To reflect its establishment, the station's callsign and corporate identity were rebranded accordingly. Operating independently, ZOE TV offered a diverse programming lineup that included religious broadcasts, news and public affairs shows, music videos, educational content, lifestyle features, and infomercial segments—positioning itself as a distinctive alternative to the dominant networks on the VHF channel spectrum.

From its early days, ZOE TV operated out of the Strata 2000 Building in the Pasig section of Ortigas Center, where it housed its offices, studio, master control systems, and transmission facilities— sharing the location with the Southern Broadcasting Network.

In 1999, broadcast distribution firm Enternet, led by Benito Araneta, entered a channel lease agreement with DZOE-TV, enabling daytime simulcasts of CNBC Asia. The arrangement eventually expanded into a 24-hour programming partnership. However, due to contractual disagreements, the partnership was dissolved in 2002, with Enternet later filing legal action against Bro. Eddie Villanueva and ZOE. Despite the fallout, the ZOE TV brand continued throughout this period.

Notably, in 2001, ZOE TV became the first television station to cover the second EDSA Revolution, an uprising that culminated in the removal of President Joseph Estrada from office amid widespread corruption allegations and perceived violations of the 1987 Constitution

Following years of extended broadcasting hours, particularly during the CNBC Asia simulcast era, the station scaled back its operations in 2003, airing from 1:00 PM to 11:00 PM daily. This 10-hour programming schedule remained in effect until August 31, 2005.

=== GMA Network Partnership (2005–2019) ===
In April 2005, Citynet Network Marketing and Productions, Inc. (a GMA Network subsidiary) and ZOE TV struck a deal: Citynet would lease ZOE TV's entire airtime in exchange for upgrading ZOE TV's facilities. ZOE would also distribute its in-house programs on GMA Network.

This agreement was crucial for GMA's plan to revive its sister television network, Citynet, which had previously ceased operations in 2001 due to financial difficulties. Although Citynet had its own station, DWDB-TV channel 27, its degraded transmitter prevented its signal from reaching areas covered by GMA's flagship DZBB-TV. The partnership with ZOE TV was seen as GMA's best option to maintain household viewership in the market during the sister network's revival.

On September 1, 2005, ZOE TV Channel 11 temporarily ceased broadcasting after its last program, ISLA Hour. This was to allow GMA Network to install, upgrade, and rehabilitate ZOE TV's transmitter and studio facilities.

GMA decommissioned Channel 11's original 40 kW transmitter in Ortigas, replacing it with a more powerful 100 kW transmitter at their Tower of Power site in Quezon City. ZOE TV continues to hold the station's license and manage transmitter operations, adhering to ownership restrictions that limit broadcasters to one station per frequency.

On November 11, 2005, following test broadcasts, GMA/Citynet took over master control of Channel 11, launching their new second TV network via ZOE TV.

Initially, it debuted as QTV (Quality TeleVision, an all-female lifestyle channel, later rebranded as Q in 2007. On February 28, 2011, it reformatted again to GMA News TV (now GTV), focusing on news and public affairs.

For 14 years, these brands operated as joint ventures between ZOE and Citynet. In return, ZOE's in-house programs aired daily on Q and GMA News TV during sign-on/off, and on GMA during off-peak weekend hours.

Through the investment of GMA/Citynet, ZOE TV resumed its independent broadcasting via UHF Channel 33 in November 2006, which became its permanent frequency ever since.

=== GMA-Zoe split (2019–2020) ===
On April 24, 2019, GMA/Citynet announced it would terminate its blocktime agreement with ZOE Broadcasting by the end of May 2019. This decision was driven by rising lease payments, which, according to GMA's 2018 financial report, increased from ₱899.89 million in 2016 to nearly ₱1 billion in 2018. While third-party sources suggested Channel 11 would then simulcast ZOE's sister station, DZOZ-DTV channel 33, ZOE offered no official statement on its future plans.

GMA extended GNTV's run on Channel 11 until June 4. The transition, a two-stage process, began on June 3 with the removal of all ZOE's in-house programs from GMA and GNTV. On June 4, as Channel 11 was set to cease broadcasting, GNTV Manila's operations (master control, sales, and employees) successfully moved to the revamped DWDB-TV for its remaining analog broadcast. However, ZOE engineers missed the Channel 11 shutoff notice, causing a broadcast conflict with Channel 27 and delaying the final cutoff until midnight on June 5.

=== Broadcast Resumption/Test Broadcasting (2020) ===
After a year offline, ZOE Broadcasting Network reactivated its 100-kilowatt VHF Channel 11 transmitter on June 22, 2020, now from Antipolo. The station initially carried a Light TV feed for testing, which was replaced by Hillsong Channel (owned by Trinity Broadcasting Network) from June 26 to July 11. These broadcasts are rumored to be a marketing effort, possibly for continued analog simulcasting of sister station UHF 33, or for new blocktime/channel leasing agreements.

=== Blocktime partnership with ABS-CBN, Formation of A2Z (2020–present) ===
Since 2017, ZOE Broadcasting Network and ABS-CBN Corporation were reportedly in talks over leasing Channel 11 or acquiring the network, amid the controversies behind ABS-CBN's now-expired broadcast franchise. After the franchise renewal was denied by the Congress in July 2020, reports emerged of a blocktime deal granting ABS-CBN 22 hours of daily airtime on Channel 11, featuring shows like Ang Probinsyano, ASAP, It's Showtime, and TV Patrol. Initially, ZOE declined to air ABS-CBN News content due to editorial concerns linked to the Duterte administration’s criticism of the network. This changed on January 1, 2022, when TV Patrol Weekend resumed free-to-air broadcasting via Channel 11, and then, 2 days later, the weeknight edition.

On October 6, 2020, ABS-CBN and ZOE TV announced their blocktime deal and the rebranding of Channel 11 as A2Z, over a year after ZOE’s disaffiliation from GMA News TV and five months after ABS-CBN Channel 2's shutdown. The announcement followed Sky Cable's addition of ZOE TV 11 to its lineup. Launched on October 10, A2Z features Kapamilya Channel entertainment content, Knowledge Channel educational content, and religious programs from Light TV, CBN Asia, and other blocktimers.

In November 2025, the National Telecommunications Commission (NTC) issued Memorandum Circular No. 005-11-2025, establishing a 12-month transition period for analog television stations operating in Mega Manila. The covered area includes the National Capital Region and parts of Bulacan, Rizal, Laguna, Cavite, Pampanga and Bataan. In July 2026, the NTC identified November 22, 2026, as the target date for the Mega Manila analog switch-off. The analog shutdown date was extended by the NTC on November 17, 2026, from the original November 22, 2026, it became January 15, 2027.

== Digital television ==
=== Subchannels ===
DZOE-TV operates on UHF Channel 20 (509.143 MHz), and is multiplexed into the following subchannels:

Channel	Video	Aspect	Short name	Programming	Note
20.01	480i	16:9	A2Z	A2Z (Main DZOE-TV programming)	Commercial broadcast (5.5 kW)
20.02	480i	16:9	Light TV	Light TV (Mirror feed from DZOZ-DTV)	Commercial broadcast (5.5 kW)
20.31	240p	16:9	A2Z Oneseg	Black screen	1seg broadcast

=== Subchannel history ===
DZOE-TV initially aired digitally via GMA’s DZBB-TV, with its second subchannel carrying Channel 11 programming. GMA Manila launched its digital signal in 2013 on UHF channel 27, later transitioning to channel 15 in line with the National Telecommunications Commission’s plan to assign channels 14–20 to major broadcasters. Trial broadcasts began in May, and by June 4, GMA’s digital operations in Mega Manila consolidated under channel 15.

Following the revival of analog broadcasts on Channel 11, ZOE TV began test transmissions on its assigned digital UHF channel 20. When A2Z launched on October 10, 2020, it was initially analog-only pending NTC approval for digital airing. It went live digitally on November 12, 2020, during Typhoon Vamco (Ulysses), and expanded reach with Light TV simulcast on its second subchannel. On July 1, 2024, DZOE-TV adopted the anamorphic 16:9 screen ratio format for its main channel output. The Light TV subchannel feeds, however, converted to widescreen broadcasting more than a year later, on December 15, 2025, to coincide with the launch of its refreshed logo.

== Areas of coverage ==
=== Primary areas ===
- Metro Manila
- Cavite
- Bulacan
- Rizal
- Laguna

=== Secondary areas ===
- Pampanga
- Northern Batangas
- Southern Bataan
- Southern Nueva Ecija
- Central Tarlac

== See also ==
- ZOE Broadcasting Network
- Light TV
- DZMV-TV
- All TV
- QTV/Q
- GMA News TV
- GTV
- A2Z
- DZMM Radyo Patrol 630 (AM radio Owned and operated by Philippine Collective Media Corporation)
- FM Radio 92.3 (FM radio Owned and operated by Philippine Collective Media Corporation)
