= CBN Asia =

Nonprofit corporation in the Philippines and Hong Kong

Christian Broadcasting Networks Asia (CBN Asia) is a non-stock nonprofit corporation. It was established in the Philippines and Hong Kong on October 1, 1994. It is inspired by the Christian Broadcasting Network (CBN), founded in the United States by Pat Robertson in 1961.

== Missions and operations ==
CBN Asia is involved in several ministries that spread the Gospel in Asian nations, primarily through The 700 Club Asia, a locally produced weeknight television program, as well as other TV specials.

Its ministries include the humanitarian aid foundation Operation Blessing (OB), the Asian counterpart of the US-based Operation Blessing International. Since 1994, OB humanitarian missions have expanded from the Philippines to operate in China, India, Indonesia, Thailand, and Taiwan. In 1996, OB became the humanitarian arm of CBN Asia, Inc., which was founded by Gordon P. Robertson.

CBN Asia also participates in the Asian Center for Missions project, an Asia-wide network for spreading the Gospel, which also comprises the Philippines for Jesus Movement (PJM), the Philippine Council of Evangelical Churches (PCEC), the Asian Seminary of Christian Ministries (ASCM), the International Bible Society, and other Asian church and fellowship groups.

== Programs ==
- The 700 Club Asia (GMA Network, 22 February 1995–2002, 2015–present; ABS-CBN & ABC "now TV5", 2002–2006; Studio 23 (defunct), 2003–2006; ZOE TV, 1998–2005; Q/GMA News TV, 2006–2015 (including live telethon specials); Light Network, 2011–present)
- A.S.T.I.G. (All Set To Imitate God) (ABC "now TV5", 7 May 2005–2006)
- One Cubed (GMA Network, 1999–2001; ABS-CBN, 2002–2006)
- SuperBook Reimagined and SuperBook Classics (GMA Network, 2013–2014; ABS-CBN, 2014–2017, re-run, 2019–2020 on Season 4; ZOE TV/A2Z, 1998–2005, 2020–present; Light TV, 2010–2014, 2019–present, 2024 on Season 5; Kapamilya Channel) (3D and Classic versions)

== Filmography ==
CBN Asia produced a telefilm and documentary, which have occasionally aired on GMA Network and ABS-CBN, usually during the Holy Week, and also airs on Light TV.

- Ang Sapi (1994)
- Pangarap Kong Pasko (1994)
- GMA Telesine Specials: Kung Saan Sisikat ang Araw (co-produced by CAN Television, April 9, 1995)
- Huwad na Langit (1996)
- Ano ang Kulay ng Pangarap? (March 23, 1997)
- Yakapin Mo ang Liwanag (1998)
- Lamat sa Puso (1999)
- Sa Ngalan ng Anak (2006)
- Tanikala (2009–present)
  - Ako'y Sa'yo (April 3, 2026)
  - Ama Namin (March 29, 2013)
  - Ang Ikalawang Libro (April 1–2, 2010)
  - Bihag ng Kadiliman (2009)
  - Buyonero (March 25, 2016, re-aired April 18, 2019)
  - Habang May Ngayon (April 1, 2021)
  - Hatol (April 18, 2014)
  - Isa Pang Hiling (April 2, 2021)
  - It's Unfair (March 29, 2018)
  - Kalbaryo (March 26, 2016)
  - Kampihan (April 7, 2023)
  - Kublihan (April 19, 2019)
  - Kulam (April 21, 2011)
  - Liwanag sa Dapithapon (March 28, 2013, re-aired April 19, 2014)
  - My Sister, My Lover (April 17, 2014)
  - Nuno (April 14, 2017, re-aired March 31, 2018)
  - Paghilom (April 15, 2022)
  - Panata (April 23, 2011)
  - Pilat (March 30, 2018)
  - Preso (April 18, 2025)
  - Sa Isang Iglap (April 2, 2015, re-aired March 24, 2016)
  - Sais-Katorse (April 13, 2017, re-aired March 31, 2018)
  - Senior Moment (April 6, 2023)
  - Suklob (April 10, 2020)
  - Tugon (March 29, 2024)
  - Songbird The Ogie Alcasid & Regine Velasquez Story (2025)
  - Tugon sa Dalangin (April 14, 2022)
  - Unos (April 5, 2012)
  - Wasak (April 22, 2011, re-aired April 7, 2012, April 15, 2017)
- Gulong (2010)
- Tinig (October 7, 2012)
- In My Father's Arms (April 14, 2017)
- Wanda's Wonderful World (March 30, 2018)
