= DWXI-AM =

Radio station in Metro Manila, Philippines

DWXI
- Makati; Philippines
- Broadcast area: Metro Manila and surrounding areas
- Frequency: 1314 kHz
- Branding: DWXI 1314

Programming
- Languages: Filipino, English
- Format: News, Public Affairs, Talk, Religious Radio (El Shaddai)

Ownership
- Owner: Delta Broadcasting System
- Sister stations: DBS TV 35

History
- First air date: May 5, 1968
- Former call signs: DZSA (1968–1981)
- Former frequencies: 1230 kHz (1968–1978)
- Call sign meaning: Roman numeral for 11

Technical information
- Licensing authority: NTC
- Class: B (Regional)
- Power: 50,000 watts
- Transmitter coordinates: 14°26′19.0068″N 120°52′44.328″E

Links
- Webcast: Listen Live
- Website: DWXI 1314

DWXI (1314 AM) is a religious AM radio station owned and operated by Delta Broadcasting System, the media arm of El Shaddai in the Philippines. The station's studio is located at the 7th Floor, Queensway Commercial Tower, 118 Amorsolo St., Legaspi Village, Makati, while its transmitter is located along Gen. Alvarez St., Brgy. San Rafael III, Noveleta, Cavite.

As of Q4 2022, DWXI is the 4th most-listened to AM radio station (and #1 among religious radio stations) in Metro Manila, based on a survey commissioned by Kantar Media Philippines and Kapisanan ng mga Brodkaster ng Pilipinas.

== History ==
DZSA was established on May 5, 1968. The station then aired an OPM format, dubbed as Himpilang Sariling Atin. Ernie Baron was among the anchors of the fledgling station, before he returned to ABS-CBN in 1986. It was then broadcasting on 1230 kHz until 1978, when it transferred to the present frequency of 1314 kHz, adopting the 9 kHz spacing for AM Broadcasting.

In 1981, at the height of his real estate business expansion in Parañaque, around what is now Ninoy Aquino International Airport (also known as Manila International Airport), Velarde bought DZSA from the original owners of the Delta Broadcasting System for ₱2 million, because he needed the parcel of land on which it stood. Besides, the owners would not sell the land unless the radio station was included in the deal. The radio station alone would later cost him millions more to sustain its operations. Upon acquisition, he started operating the station following his recovery from a heart ailment to propagate the healing message from the Word of God. This prompted him to establish the El Shaddai Catholic Charismatic Group in 1984.

After he bought that station from its former compound behind the formerly Manila Bay Casino in Santo Niño, Parañaque, it moved to Multinational Village in Moonwalk, Parañaque, in 1990. In 1998, it transferred to its present location in Legaspi Village in Makati. Back then, it was ranked third among the AM radio stations in Metro and Mega Manila.

In 1998, during El Shaddai's 14th Anniversary Overnight Celebration, DWXI launched a new slogan, "Ang Tunay na Lakas na Galing sa Itaas!", in which the station's transmitting power was upgraded to 30,000 watts, then in 2022, it upgraded to 50,000 watts. Since October 30, 2019, its programs can be viewed live on YouTube and Facebook, as well as Tuesday and Saturday Family Appointment With El Shaddai Live Streaming, early morning Masses from Tuesday to Friday and 7:00am Holy Mass every Monday at College of Divine Wisdom Chapel in Parañaque, and the Amorsolo Prayer Meetings every Monday, Wednesday, Thursday, and Friday.

== See also ==
- DWDE-TV
- Delta Broadcasting System
- El Shaddai (movement)
- Mike Velarde
- Roman Catholic Diocese of Parañaque
