= 1458 AM =

AM radio frequency

The following radio stations broadcast on AM frequency 1458 kHz:

== Philippines ==
- DZJV in Manila

== United Kingdom ==
- Lyca Radio in London & South East England
- BBC Asian Network in Birmingham & the West Midlands

== Defunct ==
- Gold Radio in Manchester
