= El Shaddai (movement) =

Catholic religious movement based in the Philippines

El Shaddai DWXI Prayer Partners Fellowship International
- Formation: August 20, 1984; 42 years ago
- Type: Catholic Charismatic Movement
- Headquarters: Amvel Business Park
- Location: San Dionisio, Parañaque, Metro Manila
- Coordinates: 14.4897°N 120.9946°E
- Region served: Philippines and Worldwide
- Members: 8 million
- Official language: English and Filipino
- Servant Leader: Mike Velarde
- Spiritual Adviser: Teodoro C. Bacani, Jr., O.P.
- Subsidiaries: College of Divine Wisdom
- Affiliations: DWXI

El Shaddai DWXI Prayer Partners Fellowship International, popularly known as El Shaddai, (which is one of the names of God in the Jewish faith) is the biggest Catholic charismatic movement in the Philippines. The movement is led by Mike Velarde, a real estate developer and preacher. Novaliches bishop emeritus Teodoro Bacani Jr. serves as its spiritual adviser.

== History ==
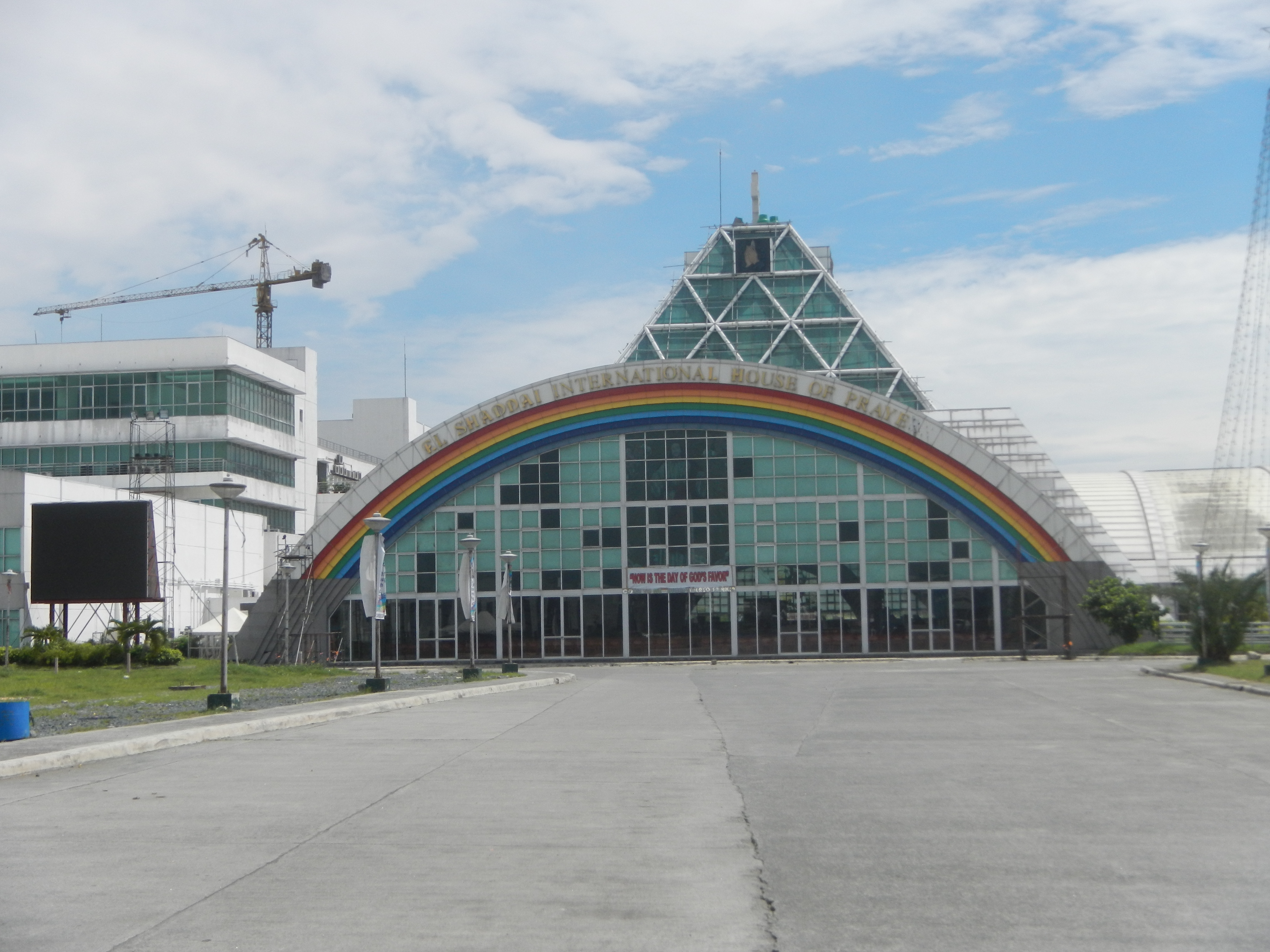
El Shaddai International House of Prayer in Parañaque currently hosts the main gathering of El Shaddai

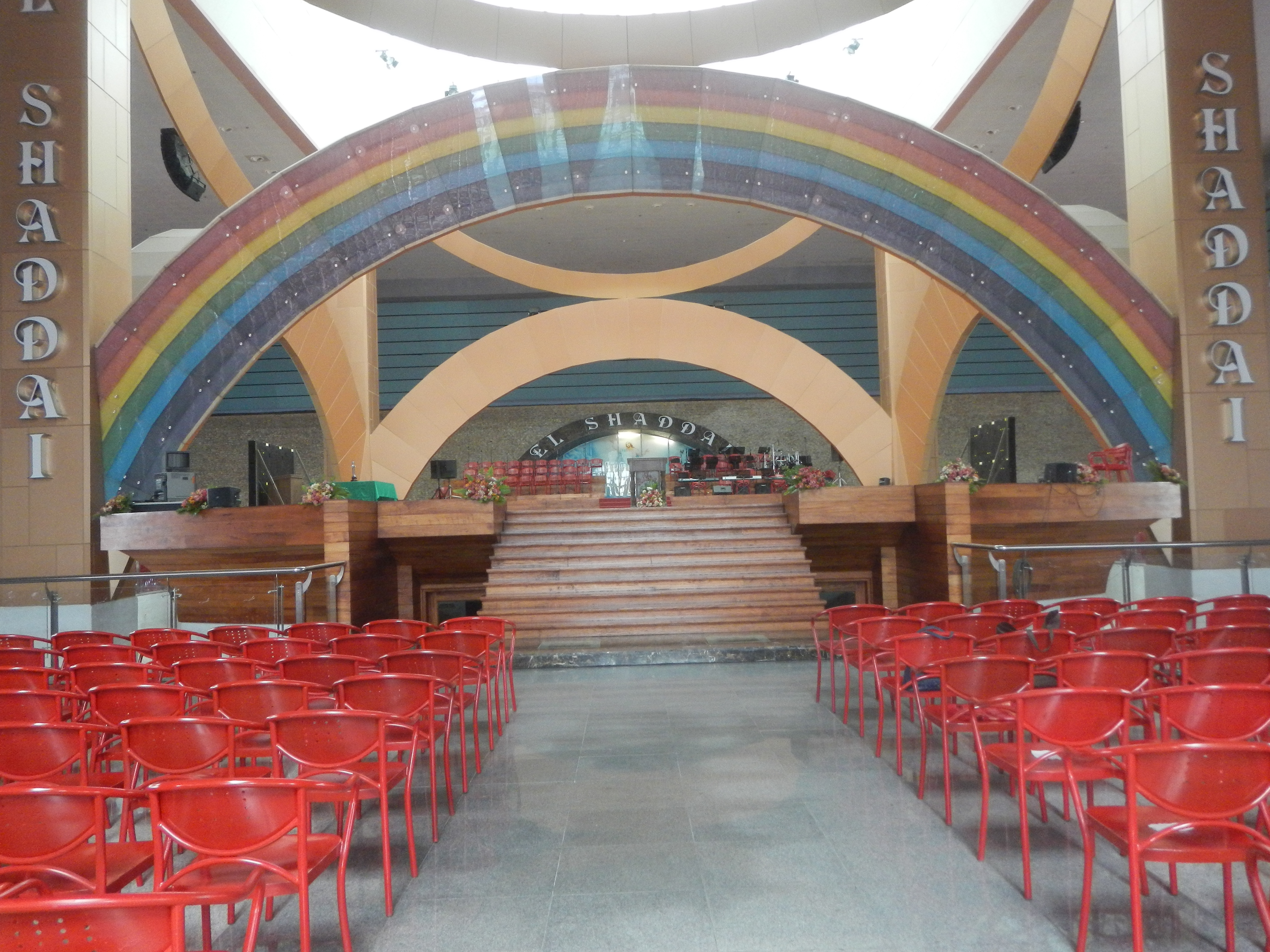
Inside the El Shaddai International House of Prayer

El Shaddai was established in 1984 by Mike Velarde, a businessman and real estate developer. Inspired by his recovery from a heart surgery in 1978, Velarde started a weekly Bible-quoting radio show on DWXI, a station he acquired in 1981 as part of a real estate deal. Velarde claimed that listeners to his programs began reporting that his voice had cured their afflictions. Velarde called his show "El Shaddai," a biblical name for God that he found in an American religious pamphlet.

Velarde then held monthly prayer rallies outside the vicinity of the radio station. As the number of attendees kept growing, he made the rallies weekly until the crowd could no longer be accommodated by the area. The rallies were then moved to various locations such as a football stadium and then transferring several times to the Quirino Grandstand at Rizal Park in Manila; the open grounds outside the Philippine International Convention Center and the Cultural Center of the Philippines in Pasay near Manila Bay; and finally in Amvel Business Park, Barangay San Dionisio, Parañaque (a site owned by the family) in order to accommodate the movement's followers.

In 1992, Velarde and the movement expanded to television, when the movement taking its programming airtime on the government owned broadcasting network Intercontinental Broadcasting Corporation with the Sunday late night delayed broadcast of the weekly Saturday Family Appointments, and the broadcasts of the weekly Family Appointments became the sixth longest-reigning religious program in Philippine television history until its ended in 2020 after 28 years of airing on the network. In addition, the movement also produced the faith-based drama anthology series Mga Himala at Gintong Aral ni El Shaddai from 1994 until its cancellation in 1997. Velarde himself served as the host for the series.

In 1998, Velarde and Jesus Is Lord Church leader Eddie Villanueva engaged in a legal battle over control of the Christian television station DZOE-TV (Channel 11). Villanueva has the franchise and the authority to operate the facility, but Velarde, using political connections, was able to import transmission equipment, the value of which he claims to have converted into equity in the station. Congress intervened and awarded Villanueva the right the acquire the frequency, with him paying Velarde for the stock and assets held by Delta Broadcasting System (DBS).

The El Shaddai Movement has grown rapidly in the last decade and, as of 2005, had a reported 8 million members worldwide.

On August 20, 2009, El Shaddai inaugurated a ₱1 billion (approx. US$21 million at the time) House of Prayer on a ten hectare site in Amvel Business Park. The cost does not include the land, which will be paid for over 20 years. The building is 10,000 square meters and seats 16,000 with standing room for another 25,000, with space on the site for an overflow of the crowd. The building was inaugurated by Gloria Macapagal Arroyo, the fourteenth president of the Philippines, on Velarde's 70th birthday.

As it is a Roman Catholic movement, its diocesan bishop is Jessie Mercado of the Diocese of Parañaque, while its spiritual director is the Bishop Emeritus of Novaliches Teodoro Bacani.

== Reception ==
In 2005, sociocultural anthropologist and author Katharine L. Wiegele said that El Shaddai has spread prosperity theology outside Protestant Christianity in the Philippines.

=== Political influence ===
Conspiracy theorists propagate the belief that El Shaddai plays a major role in Philippine politics. They assert that former President Fidel V. Ramos won the 1992 general election because of the movement's votes, although this has never been corroborated with an actual tally of votes correlated with El Shaddai membership rosters. Moreover, the Catholic Church, of which El Shaddai is an apostolate, refrains from interfering in temporal matters and, as such, does not dictate to its members which candidates to support or oppose. In the same vein, individual members of the Catholic Church are free to form voting blocs that are independent from the church itself, as in the case of Catholic Vote.

During the impeachment trial of President Joseph Estrada in late 2000, Velarde, in line with Catholic teaching regarding temporal matters, rejected the call of then-Archbishop of Manila, Cardinal Jaime Sin, to join a prayer rally urging Estrada to resign. Velarde said that El Shaddai members were free to join the rally of their own volition and reiterated that the movement was neither for nor against Estrada's resignation.

During EDSA III in 2001, El Shaddai is one of the groups that attended the Pro Erap rally.

It was reported that Velarde attempted to end a 2005 Philippine electoral crisis by uniting the Estrada and Arroyo camps.

=== Michael Jackson's concert in the PICC grounds ===
Before the concert of Michael Jackson in 1996, Velarde engaged in a temporary legal battle when the concert organizers recommended that the PICC land area be used as the venue for the former's concert; he occupied the rented area used by the El Shaddai Movement. Both parties agreed on using the area for his concert but not on Velarde's schedule for his so-called "Family Appointment".

== See also ==
- Delta Broadcasting System
- DWXI 1314 kHz AM
- DWDE-TV
- Mike Velarde
