= Citizens' Battle Against Corruption =

Political party in the Philippines

- — Philippine partylist —
- Abbreviation: CIBAC
- President: Joel Villanueva
- Founded: 1997; 29 years ago
- COMELEC accreditation: 2001; 25 years ago
- Headquarters: Quezon City, Metro Manila
- Ideology: Reformism
- Colors: Yellow, Green

Current representation (20th Congress)
- Seats in the House of Representatives: 1 / 3 (Out of 63 party-list seats)
- Representative(s): Eddie Villanueva

Website
- cibacpartylist.org

The Citizens' Battle Against Corruption (CIBAC IPA: [sɪbak]) is a political organization in the Philippines, founded in 1997. It is a party-list member in the House of Representatives of the Philippines. and is dedicated towards fighting graft, corruption and cronyism in government.

CIBAC is affiliated with the Jesus Is Lord Church Worldwide.

== History ==
Citizens' Battle Against Corruption (CIBAC) was established in 1997 as an organization that would combat corruption and cronyism in government. CIBAC stated that its activities include assisting in the filing of legal cases against erring government officials with the Ombudsman. It cooperated with the Volunteers Against Crime and Corruption (VACC) in 2000. It also took part in political protests, including the Second EDSA Revolution.

Registered as a party list with the Commission on Elections (COMELEC) in 2001, CIBAC first sought representation in the House of Representatives in the national election held in the same year. CIBAC won a seat but was initially disqualified by the COMELC due to its religious affiliation with the Jesus Is Lord Church Worldwide (JILCW).

After the disqualification was successfully contested, Joel Villanueva, son of JILCW preacher Eddie Villanueva, assumed office as a House representative on February 6, 2002.

In the 2004 election, CIBAC retained its seat but filed a petition to gain a second seat. The Supreme Court in 2007 maintained that the calculations for seats based on the 2000 decision Veterans Federation Party et al. vs. COMELEC was appropriately applied to the 2004 vote.

In 2008, CIBAC representative Joel Villanueva allegedly misused 10 million pesos in public funds from the Priority Development Assistance Fund (PDAF). Ombudsman investigations found that Villanueva's disbursements were coursed through a questionable NGO for an agricultural and livelihood project that turned out to be a ghost project. Administrative sanctions for grave misconduct, serious dishonesty, and conduct prejudicial to the best interest of public service were imposed on him in 2016, where criminal charges were also filed against him in the Sandiganbayan due to two counts of violation of the Anti-Graft and Corrupt Practices Act and one count of malversation through falsification of public documents.

== Electoral performance ==
Election	Votes	%	Seats
2001	323,810	2.14%	1
2004	495,193	3.89%	1
2007	755,735	4.72%	2
2010	653,399	2.19%	2
2013	579,344	2.13%	2
2016	555,760	1.72%	1
2019	924,345	3.35%	2
2022	637,044	1.73%	1
2025	593,911	1.42%	1

== Representatives to Congress ==
Period	1st Representative	2nd Representative
12th Congress; 2001–2004	Joel Villanueva (from 2002 (Note: Assumed office on February 6, 2002.))	—N/a
13th Congress; 2004–2007	Joel Villanueva	—N/a
14th Congress; 2007–2010	Joel Villanueva	Cinchona Cruz-Gonzales
15th Congress; 2010–2013	Sherwin Tugna	Cinchona Cruz-Gonzales
16th Congress; 2013–2016	Sherwin Tugna	Cinchona Cruz-Gonzales
17th Congress; 2016–2019	Sherwin Tugna	—N/a
18th Congress; 2019–2022	Eddie Villanueva	Domingo Rivera
19th Congress; 2022–2025	Eddie Villanueva	—N/a
20th Congress; 2025–2028	Eddie Villanueva	—N/a
Note: A party-list group, can win a maximum of three seats in the House of Representatives.
