= Tower of Power (transmitter) =

Radio tower in Quezon City, Philippines

- Aerial view of the Tower of Power (2025)
- Location: Quezon City, Metro Manila, Philippines
- Tower height: 236.8 m (777 ft)
- Coordinates: 14°40′12″N 121°3′0″E
- Built: October 1988; 38 years ago
- Commissioned: November 7, 1988; 38 years ago
- Owner: GMA Network, Inc.

The Tower of Power is a 777 ft (236.8 m), 120,000 watt radio tower owned by the GMA Network in the Philippines, located at Tandang Sora Avenue, Barangay Culiat, Quezon City. It serves as a transmitter facility for GMA's flagship stations, including DZBB-TV, GTV's DWDB-TV, and Barangay LS 97.1.

== History ==
The Tower of Power was constructed on a huge vacant lot in the 3rd Quarter of 1987, as a new edifice for the network and for the preparation for Rainbow Satellite broadcast to replace an old surplus 50-kilowatt transmitter located at the old RBS building (now known as GMA Network Center) along EDSA, and to provide clearer TV and FM reception. The tower's construction uses 600 tonnes (590 long tons; 660 short tons) of steel from a local steel mill and construction costed ₱170 million. Antennas are also provided to enhance signal strength. After several months of planning, the tower was completed in October 1988 and on November 7 the tower was switched on by then-President Corazon Aquino and the GMA Network board of directors. A TV special was started after the inauguration. The slogan GMA-7-POWER was used from November 7 to December 1 of that year as the station ID. During its first decade of operations, GMA operated with 50,000 watts of transmitter power output, until in 1998 when GMA upgraded to its current 120-kilowatt capacity, which broadcasts at 100,000 watts of transmitter power output.

In April 2005, following its signing of a channel lease agreement with ZOE Broadcasting Network's flagship DZOE-TV 11, GMA replaced channel 11's decommissioned 40-kilowatt transmitter in Pasig with a newly purchased 100 kW transmitter system built and installed by GMA. Since channel 7's technical staff is prohibited by law from operating channel 11 due to the fact that both stations are in the same VHF channel band, the Tower of Power site leased portions of its space to Zoe for its own technical team to operate and maintain channel 11's signal. ZOE's 14-year lease in the site ended in mid-2019 following GMA's decision not to renew the agreement amid the company's increasing lease payment obligations to channel 11's owners. ZOE's 100 kW transmitter equipment was later transferred to its own compound in Antipolo, Rizal, which was eventually reused when channel 11 was relaunched as A2Z Channel 11 under a blocktime agreement with erstwhile rival network ABS-CBN on October 10, 2020.

== Features ==
=== The tower ===
The Tower of Power uses a high-gain corner reflector antennas and UHF panel antennas to produce a wide coverage of Analog (VHF TV and UHF TV, using the NTSC format) and Digital (ISDB-T) TV reception across Mega Manila in both grades A and B for the broadcasts of DZBB-TV and DWDB-TV.

For FM radio, DWLS's signal strength, utilized by a circular bay Jampro FM antenna, provides listeners with clear FM reception of 25 kilowatts which spreads out in Metro Manila and nearby provinces.

It also serves as a repeater of GTV for transmissions in Cebu (DYLS-TV) and Davao (DXRA-TV) to relay Channel 27's programs.

=== The transmitter facility ===
The transmitter facility houses television and FM radio transmitters for DZBB-TV, DWDB-TV and DWLS containing sets of transmitter equipment imported by Harris and RCA from the United States, and JVC of Japan. At the same time, the satellite downlink facility housed all satellite broadcasts directly to the United States and other countries to produce foreign programs.

== Broadcast stations ==
=== Radio ===
==== FM ====
Callsign	Branding	RDS ID	Frequency	Power (TPO)
DWLS	Barangay LS 97.1	DWLS FM, BRGY LS	97.1 MHz	25 kW

=== Television ===
==== Analog (until January 15, 2027) ====
Callsign	Programming	Channel	Video frequency	Sound frequency	Power (TPO)
DZBB	GMA	7 (VHF)	175.25 MHz	179.75 MHz	100 kW
DWDB	GTV	27 (UHF)	549.25 MHz	553.75 MHz	30 kW

==== Digital ====
Callsign	Channel	Frequency	Res.	Programming	LCN	Power (TPO)
DZBB	15	479.143 MHz	480i	GMA	7.01	15 kW
DZBB	15	479.143 MHz	480i	GTV	7.02	15 kW
DZBB	15	479.143 MHz	480i	Heart of Asia	7.03	15 kW
DZBB	15	479.143 MHz	480i	I Heart Movies	7.06	15 kW
DZBB	15	479.143 MHz	480i	Unknown	7.07	15 kW
DZBB	15	479.143 MHz	480i	Unknown	7.08	15 kW
DZBB	15	479.143 MHz	480i	Unknown	7.11	15 kW
DZBB	15	479.143 MHz	240p	GMA (1seg)	7.21	Unknown (1seg test broadcast)

== See also ==
- Millennium Transmitter - A decommissioned transmitter tower previously owned by ABS-CBN Corporation, soon to be demolished.
- Net 25 Tower - A transmitter tower owned by Eagle Broadcasting Corporation. One of the tallest structures in the Philippines.
- UNTV Transmitter - Owned by Progressive Broadcasting Corporation; located in Antipolo.
- List of famous transmission sites
