= ZOE Broadcasting Network =

Philippine television channel

ZOE Broadcasting Network, Inc. (ZBNI)
- Type: Private
- Industry: Radio and television broadcasting
- Founded: 1991 (radio broadcast); April 19, 1998; 28 years ago (television broadcast)
- Founder: Eddie Villanueva
- Headquarters: 22/F Strata 2000 Bldg., Emerald Ave., Ortigas Center, Pasig, Metro Manila, Philippines
- Area served: Nationwide
- Key people: Pastor Sam Binalla, President; Edwin Mendoza, Chief Operating Officer
- Parent: Jesus Is Lord Church
- Website: zbni.ph

ZOE TV
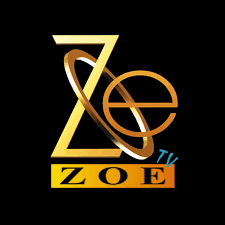
- Type: Broadcast television network
- Country: Philippines
- Broadcast area: Nationwide
- Affiliates: QTV/Q (2005–11); GMA News TV (2011–19); A2Z (2020–present)

Programming
- Languages: Filipino (main); English (secondary)
- Picture format: 1080i (HDTV)

Ownership
- Owner: ZOE Broadcasting Network

History
- Launched: April 19, 1998; 28 years ago
- Founder: Eddie Villanueva

Light TV
- Type: Broadcast television network
- Country: Philippines
- Broadcast area: Nationwide

Programming
- Languages: Filipino (main); English (secondary)
- Picture format: 1080i (HDTV)

Ownership
- Owner: ZOE Broadcasting Network

History
- Launched: March 10, 2008; 18 years ago (as ZOE TV 33); March 1, 2011; 15 years ago (as Light TV; 1st incarnation); March 31, 2014; 12 years ago (as Light Network); February 12, 2018; 8 years ago (as Light TV; 2nd incarnation)
- Founder: Eddie Villanueva
- Former names: Light Network (2014–2018)

Links
- Website: lighttv.ph

Availability

Terrestrial
- Digital terrestrial television: Channel 33.1 (Metro Manila and Palawan); Channel 20.2 (Metro Manila, Iloilo, Metro Cebu, Cagayan De Oro and Metro Davao); Channel 32.2 (Benguet)
- SkyCable (Metro Manila): Channel 230
- SkyTV (Metro Manila): Channel 222
- Sky Direct (Nationwide): Channel 18
- Cignal TV (Nationwide): Channel 183
- Cablelink (Metro Manila): Channel 77

ZOE Broadcasting Network, Inc. (ZOE TV or ZBNI) is a Philippine broadcast media arm of the Jesus Is Lord Church. Based in Ortigas Center, Pasig, it operates a network of television and radio stations in Mega Manila, Baguio, Bacolod, Calamba, Laguna, Cebu, Cagayan de Oro, Davao, Iloilo, Zamboanga and Puerto Princesa. The company owns the television station DZOE-TV 11 and its DTT companion, UHF Channel 20. Both currently air the A2Z network, a joint-venture partnership between ZOE and ABS-CBN Corporation through a blocktime agreement.

== History ==
=== Initial period ===
In the 1990s, the frequency rights of Channel 11, under the call letters DWXI-TV in Metro Manila, were given to a joint venture of two influential religious groups: El Shaddai, a Catholic charismatic-based movement headed by Mike Velarde, and Jesus Is Lord Church, an evangelical Protestant ministry headed by Eddie Villanueva. Disagreements between the organizations led to a competition for full ownership of the station. The Philippine Congress intervened and awarded JIL and Villanueva DWXI. Villanueva consummated the channel's remaining stock and assets from Velarde's Delta Broadcasting System (DBS).

On April 13, 1998, JIL began its independent broadcast history with the channel's relaunch as DZOE-TV, introducing the new ZOE Broadcasting Network, Inc. and its slogan: "Give Love, Celebrate Life."

In 1999, Entertainment Network (Enter-net), headed by Benito Araneta, and ZOE entered in a channel-lease agreement that saw Enter-net programming the station's morning and afternoon blocks with CNBC Asia. Beginning in 2002, contractual disagreements led to ZOE canceling Enter-net's programming, resulting in the latter's suit against Villanueva.

In 2001, ZOE TV became the first station to televise the second EDSA Revolution.

In 2004, Villanueva resigned as ZOE's chairman to become a Philippine presidential candidate. After finishing last in the election, he returned to the network and continues to appear on its programs.

=== Channel lease agreements ===
In April 2005, ZOE TV and Citynet Network Marketing and Productions, Inc., a subsidiary of GMA Network, Inc., entered to an agreement in which Citynet leased all of ZOE's airtime in exchange for upgrading ZOE TV's broadcast facilities, with ZOE providing in-house programming for GMA.

On September 1, 2005, Channel 11 ceased its operations with ISLA hour as its last program of the network, as GMA upgraded the station's transmitter and studios. The channel's 40 kW transmitter in Ortigas was decommissioned in favor of an upgraded 100 kW transmitter facility purchased by GMA and located at the GMA Tower of Power in Brgy. Culiat, Quezon City. Due to ownership restrictions requiring a single station per broadcaster per frequency, ZOE maintained transmitter operations and broadcast license for Channel 11. ZOE TV was relaunched on Channel 33, DZOZ-TV. Channel 33 used a newly constructed 30 kW transmitter tower station located in Antipolo, while the Ortigas Center studios remained its master control facility.

On November 11, 2005, after a series of test broadcasts, GMA Network finally handled master control operations of channel 11 and formally launched their new second TV network through ZOE TV. It debuted as an all-female lifestyle channel QTV (Quality TeleVision; later renamed as simply Q on March 18, 2007), then reformatted as news and public affairs channel GMA News TV (now known as GTV since 2021) on February 28, 2011.

In July 2006, Channel 33 began on test broadcast with its airing of job opening program Future Finder on limited broadcast hours in preparation for a relaunch of DZOZ-TV's new branding on November 27, 2006. On that day, after the series of test broadcasts, it began broadcasting, then under a blocktime agreement between ZOE and Makati-based Estima, Inc. The result of the deal was student-oriented channel UniversiTV. The channel has proven to be a hub for college and university students, catering them with evening and overnight programs every day. By that time, it operated from 4 pm to 8 am the following day, but eventually retracted its broadcast hours until 4 am during its last few months of airing. However, on March 10, 2008, UniversiTV ceased its agreement with Channel 33, possibly due to poor ratings and lack of advertisers' support. This made ZOE TV left with almost no programming to offer along with the return of the old ZOE TV station ID from 1998 until 2005, though, they surprisingly aired entertainment programs in the evening and a weekday morning TeleRadyo-formatted news program under the ZTV 33 brand. UniversiTV on the other hand, was then relaunched as a Pay TV channel via satellite and cable operators, but totally ceased operations by 2010.

=== Recent developments ===
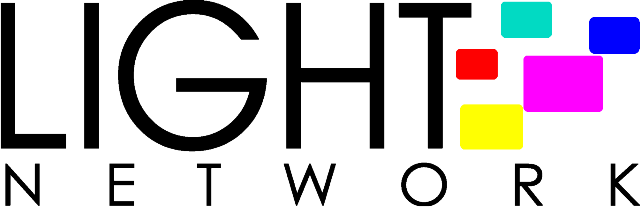
Logo used from 2014 to 2018

Logo used from 2018 to 2025

On March 1, 2011, a day after channel 11 was relaunched as GMA News TV, channel 33 was rebranded as Light TV 33, introducing new programs produced by ZOE, and at the same time, relaunching its in-house news production through its flagship newscast News Light. Soon, channel 33 slowly regained its programming, with most of the shows dedicated to religious formats. On March 31, 2014, Light TV was relaunched as Light Network, launched its refreshed logo, and had a new slogan called "Experience Light" (with "light" as reference to JIL's belief in Jesus Christ as "the light of the world"), while retaining the slogan "Kaibigan Mo" (Your Friend).

On February 28, 2017, DZOZ-TV formally ceased its traditional analog terrestrial television signal, while officially launching its digital terrestrial television signal, using the ISDB-T standard. Upon doing so, it became the first Philippine television station to permanently shut down analog transmissions, as part of the country's wider transition rollout to digital TV. A week later, on March 6, Light Network revamped its on-air presentation to reflect the digitization completion. It also launched its slogan "Magaan dito, Kaibigan" (It's light here, Friend), giving another definition to the word "light" as an easy or light-hearted experience due to its programming.

On February 12, 2018, Light Network reverted its name to Light TV with its new slogan "God's Channel of Blessings". The slogan was later dropped on December 15, 2025.

On April 24, 2019, GMA Network/Citynet Network Marketing and Productions announced that it will terminate its blocktime agreement with ZOE Broadcasting Network after June 2, 2019. The split comes after the release of GMA's 2018 financial report, which declared the increasing lease payments that the network contributes to ZOE for the past three years in exchange of operating DZOE-TV (from ₱899.89 million in 2016 to almost a billion pesos in 2018). Third-party sources reported that Channel 11 would run as a full-power analog satellite of DZOZ-DTV after the termination of the agreement, but ZOE has no official statement yet on its future plans. The termination took effect in two phases: all of ZOE's in-house programs were pulled out from GMA & GMA News TV's programming by June 3; and a day after, GMA News TV Manila's intellectual unit (master control, sales, and employees) transferred to Citynet's DWDB-TV for the remainder of the analog broadcast run.

To continue GMA Manila's digital television broadcast, DZBB-TV and its GMA News TV subchannel are reported to transfer to UHF channel 15 (479.143 MHz), which the National Telecommunications Commission, through a memorandum circular in 2016, authorized to operate as part of NTC's plans to license digital channels 14-20 for major TV broadcasts.

On June 22, 2020, ZOE Broadcasting Network broke their record as the first broadcasting company who officially switched and migrated to digital broadcast when they managed to re-air Light TV back on analog broadcast, this time via its flagship TV station VHF 11, one year after GMA News TV moved its operations via UHF 27 until February 21, 2021, when the channel relaunched as GTV the next day. 4 days later, however, the analog simulcast was short-lived and was replaced with Christian programming content while still conducting its test broadcast. It is rumored to be part of marketing the channel for either airtime/blocktime or for channel leasing.

On December 15, 2025, Light TV migrated to the 16:9 anamorphic widescreen format. The change allowed for a widescreen presentation, optimizing the viewing experience for viewers with compatible widescreen televisions. On the same day, it launched its refreshed logo.

=== Partnership deal with ABS-CBN ===
Beginning in 2017, ZOE and ABS-CBN Corporation, whose broadcast franchise the latter had lost in the network's shutdown, negotiated the possibility of either leasing Channel 11's airtime or a network merger. On October 10, 2020, the companies premiered the Channel 11 rebrand of ZOE TV as A2Z. The new channel airs shows and movies produced by ABS-CBN as well as religious shows from Light TV, Trinity Broadcasting Network and CBN Asia.

A month after the new channel's launch, the Philippine National Telecommunications Commission (NTC) reported an investigation into the legality of ABS-CBN and ZOE's blocktime agreement.

=== Affiliation with PCMC and digital terrestrial expansion ===
On September 20, 2021, ZOE Broadcasting Network partnered with Philippine Collective Media Corporation's PRTV Tacloban to air A2Z's programming on PRTV Tacloban, which became a network-affiliated station for the first time.

In January 2022, the NTC granted ZOE the provisional authority to use UHF channel 20 for its DTT operations; this allowed the network to transmit both A2Z and Light TV terrestrially outside Metro Manila.

=== Websites launched ===
On March 30, 2025, ZOE TV launched two websites ZBNI.ph (the company's main website) and ZNews, which publishes articles from Balitang A2Z, Light TV Radio, and DZJV Radyo CALABARZON.

=== Light TV expanded schedule ===
On May 5, 2025, Light TV began simulcasting A2Z's news program, Balitang A2Z, and expanded its weekday broadcast hours from 8:00 am to 11:15 pm and its weekend broadcasting hours from 8:00 am to 11:30 pm on Saturdays, and 7:00 am to 11:30 pm on Sundays (later extended from 6:00 am to 12:00 mn on October 1, 2025), returning to its pre-COVID-19 pandemic schedule.

== Legislative franchise renewal ==
On July 17, 2016, the Philippine Congress passed Republic Act No. 10888, granting ZOE TV a twenty-five year franchise for its radio and television broadcast operations throughout the country.

== Stations ==
=== TV Stations ===
==== Analog ====
Branding	Callsign	Channel	Type	Power	Location
A2Z Manila	DZOE	11	Originating	100 kW	Crestview Heights Subdivision, Brgy. San Roque, Antipolo
Light TV Palawan	DWDZ	33	Originating	5 kW	Puerto Princesa, Palawan

===== Analog Affiliate =====
Branding	Callsign	Channel	Power	Location
A2Z Tacloban	DYPR	12	3 kW	Remedios Trinidad Romualdez Hospital Compound, Brgy. 96 (Calanipawan), Tacloban

==== Digital ====
Branding	Callsign	Channel	Frequency	Type	Power	Location
A2Z Manila	DZOE	20	509.143 MHz	Originating	5.5 kW	Crestview Heights Subdivision, Brgy. San Roque, Antipolo
Light TV Manila	DZOZ	33	587.143 MHz	Originating	5 kW	Crestview Heights Subdivision, Brgy. San Roque, Antipolo
A2Z Baguio	DWBJ	32	581.143 MHz	Relay	5.5 kW	Mt. Sto. Tomas, Tuba, Benguet
A2Z Iloilo	DYZA	20	509.143 MHz	Relay	5.5 kW	Brgy. Alaguisoc, Jordan, Guimaras
A2Z Cebu	DYNZ	20	509.143 MHz	Semi-Satellite	5.5 kW	Mount Busay, Brgy. Babag 1, Cebu City
A2Z Cagayan de Oro	DXEV	20	509.143 MHz	Relay	5.5 kW	Macapagal Drive, Brgy. Bulua, Cagayan de Oro
A2Z Davao	DXEX	20	509.143 MHz	Relay	5.5 kW	Shrine Hills, Matina, Davao City

===== Digital Affiliate =====
Branding	Callsign	Channel	LCN	Frequency	Type	Owner	Power	Location
A2Z Tacloban	DYPR	50	27.03	689.143 MHz	Affiliate	Philippine Collective Media Corporation	2 kW	Remedios Trinidad Romualdez Hospital Compound, Brgy. 96 (Calanipawan), Tacloban

==== Digital Subchannels ====
ZOE TV's nationwide digital broadcast is multiplexed into the following subchannels:

LCN	Video	Aspect Ratio	Name	Programming	Notes
x.01	480i	16:9 (4:3 in regional feed areas)	A2Z	A2Z (Main DZOE-TV programming)	Commercial Broadcast
x.02	480i	16:9 (4:3 in regional feed areas)	Light TV	Light TV (DZOZ-DTV)	Commercial Broadcast
x.31	240p	16:9 (4:3 in regional feed areas)	A2Z OneSeg	Black screen	1seg

Simulcast of subchannels of another station.

=== Cable ===
Cable	Channel	Coverage
Cablelink	104	Metro Manila
Sky Cable	11	Metro Manila
Cignal	20	Nationwide
G Sat	36	Nationwide
SatLite	20	Nationwide
Parasat	4	Regional

=== Radio Stations ===
Branding	Callsign	Frequency	Power	Location
Radyo Calabarzon	DZJV	1458 kHz	10 kW	Calamba
Light FM	DWZB	91.1 MHz	5 kW	Puerto Princesa

== See also ==
- List of analog television stations in the Philippines
- List of digital television stations in the Philippines
- List of companies of the Philippines
