= DWDB-TV =

Television station in Metro Manila, Philippines

GTV-27 Manila (DWDB-TV)
- Metro Manila; Philippines
- City: Quezon City
- Channels: Analog: 27 (UHF) (until January 15, 2027; 57 days' time); Digital: DZBB-TV 15 (UHF) (ISDB-T); Virtual: 7.02
- Branding: GTV-27 Manila

Programming
- Subchannels: See list
- Affiliations: GTV

Ownership
- Owner: GMA Network, Inc.
- Sister stations: DZBB-TV (GMA); DZBB-AM (Super Radyo DZBB 594); DWLS (Barangay LS 97.1)

History
- First air date: August 27, 1995; 31 years ago
- Former call signs: As QTV/Q / GMA News TV: DZOE-TV (2005–2019)
- Former channel numbers: Analog: 11 (VHF, 2005–2019); Digital: 27 (UHF, 2013–2019)
- Former affiliations: Independent (1995–1999); Citynet Television (1995–1999); Entertainment Music Channel (1999); STAR TV through Channel [V] (1999–2001); Silent (2001–2004, 2007–2013); GMA Network (relay to Channel 7 Manila; 2004–2005); QTV/Q (relay to Channel 11 Manila; 2005–2007); Digital test broadcasts for GMA Network (2013–2019); GMA News TV (2019–2021)
- Call sign meaning: "Double B", as a variant of "BB" as in DZBB-AM and DZBB-TV

Technical information
- Licensing authority: NTC
- Power: 30,000 watts
- ERP: 120,000 watts
- Transmitter coordinates: 14°40′12″N 121°3′0″E

Links
- Website: gmanetwork.com/gtv

Citynet Network Marketing and Productions, Inc. (CNMPI)
- Type: Subsidiary
- Industry: Mass media
- Founded: August 27, 1995; 31 years ago
- Founder: Menardo Jimenez
- Headquarters: GMA Network Center, EDSA corner Timog Avenue, Brgy. South Triangle, Diliman, Quezon City, Metro Manila, Philippines
- Area served: Worldwide
- Key people: Felipe L. Gozon (Chairman and Adviser); Gilberto Duavit Jr. (President and CEO); Atty. Annette Gozon-Valdes (Senior Vice President)
- Products: GTV Formerly: GMA News TV (2011–2021); QTV/Q (2005–2011); Channel [V] Philippines (1999–2001); Entertainment Music Channel (1999); Citynet Television (1995–1999)
- Services: Television production and distribution; design, construction and maintenance of sets for TV, stage plays and concerts; transportation and manpower services
- Parent: GMA Network Inc.
- Subsidiaries: Script2010 Inc.
- Website: gmanetwork.com

DWDB-TV (channel 27) is a television station in Metro Manila, Philippines, serving as the flagship of the GTV network. It is owned and operated by GMA Network, Inc. through its licensee and subsidiary Citynet Network Marketing and Productions, Inc. (CNMPI), alongside GMA flagship DZBB-TV (channel 7). Its studios are located at the GMA Network Center, EDSA corner Timog Avenue, Diliman, Quezon City, while DWDB-TV's hybrid analog and digital transmitting facility is located at the GMA Tower of Power, Tandang Sora Avenue, Barangay Culiat, Quezon City (sharing facilities with sister stations GMA-7 and Barangay LS 97.1).

== History ==
=== Citynet 27: GMA's foray into independent programming (1995–2001) ===
Citynet Television logo from 1995 until 1999.

DWDB-TV, broadcasting as Citynet Television 27 (or simply Citynet 27), officially launched on August 27, 1995. Operated by GMA Network, Citynet 27 was designed to function as an independent station, primarily serving as a platform for imported programming, especially from the United States; this enabled the main GMA Network service (channel 7) to concentrate more on local programming.

While heavily reliant on international content, Citynet 27 did feature a limited number of local productions. Notable among these were Citynet Television News, a news program produced by CNMPI News and Public Affairs, and Citycourt, an anthology series that dramatized significant court cases from Philippine history, including the trial of the national hero José Rizal, also produced by Citynet News and Public Affairs. Citynet formed its own news organization as a sub-division of GMA News and Public Affairs in partnership w/ Singaporean media networks CNBC Asia and the defunct Asia Business News (the former replaced and merged with the latter). The station also notably aired the Venezuelan telenovela Ka Ina, making it one of the few Hispanic TV series locally dubbed in English at the time.

Citynet 27's run as an independent station continued until 1999 when it underwent a rebranding.

=== From Independent to EMC 27 / Channel [V] Philippines (1999–2001) ===
By 1999, Citynet 27's initial independent programming model proved financially unsustainable for GMA Network. The operational costs were soaring, exacerbated by stiff competition from Studio 23 (later was rebranded as S+A in 2014, and now known as Aliw Channel 23), a rival UHF network operated by ABS-CBN Corporation through AMCARA Broadcasting Network.

In response, DWDB-TV pivoted, transforming into a music channel under the temporary brand EMC, which stood for the Entertainment Music Channel. This made EMC the Philippines' first locally-operated music channel. Just a few months later, GMA struck a deal with Asian broadcaster STAR TV, leading to DWDB becoming the local carrier for Channel V Philippines starting December 19, 1999. This wasn't entirely new territory for GMA, as they had already aired select programming from Channel V's international version since Citynet 27's inception in 1995, introducing viewers to VJs like Filipino descended Trey Farley and Joey Mead.

However, this partnership became short-lived as the Philippine Long Distance Telephone Company (PLDT) acquired a stake in GMA. This presented a significant conflict of interest, as PLDT already owned MTV Philippines through its subsidiary Nation Broadcasting Corporation and parent company MediaQuest Holdings. This conflict, coupled with the escalating competition from the MTV-affiliated network, ultimately led to Channel V Philippines, and by extension DWDB-TV, signing off on July 25, 2001.

=== Becoming a relay, QTV and usage of frequency for digital tests (2004-2007) ===
After a period off-air, programming returned to DWDB-TV in 2004, serving as a relay of GMA-7 Manila.

A significant shift occurred in November 2005 when DWDB became a repeater for DZOE 11, the flagship station for GMA's new secondary national network, QTV (Quality Television, later simply Q). This arrangement stemmed from an agreement between GMA and ZOE Broadcasting Network, DZOE 11's owner where in exchange for handling QTV's programming, GMA committed to providing ZOE Broadcasting with upgraded facilities and clearance of ZOE-produced content within QTV's schedule. DWDB's UHF signal offered a distinct advantage, providing easier reception in the southern areas of Metro Manila, particularly in Makati and Pasay.

However, DWDB's analog channel was vacated in 2007, ahead of facilitating trials for digital television.

=== DWDB-DTV and GMA Network's Digital Transition ===
GMA commenced its digital test broadcasts in February 2013, utilizing the Japanese ISDB-T digital TV platform on DWDB's UHF channel 27 frequency. These initial tests simulcast both GMA-7 (the main channel) and GMA News TV-11, indicating GMA's early steps into the digital realm.

On May 15, 2019, GMA Network's digital test broadcasts transitioned to UHF Channel 15 (479.143 MHz). assigned by the National Telecommunications Commission as the broadcaster's primary digital feed. The move also coincided with the original Channel 27 frequency reverting to analog broadcast, specifically for GMA News TV, following the termination of GMA's agreement with ZOE Broadcasting Network in early June 2019, which led to GMA News TV's former Channel 11 becoming silent. This strategic allocation allowed GMA to continue its analog broadcast feed.

=== Analog Resurgence through GMA News TV and Digital Transition Hurdles (2019–2021) ===
On April 24, 2019, ZOE Broadcasting Network and GMA/Citynet formally announced the impending conclusion of their 14-year blocktime agreement, effective end of May 2019. This decision marked the end of GMA News TV's long-standing lease on VHF Channel 11.

While initial reports suggested ZOE Broadcasting Network would subsequently simulcast its sister station, Light TV 33, ZOE offered no official statement on its immediate future plans. However, ZOE Broadcasting Network would later reactivate Channel 11 on June 22, 2020, following a landmark deal with former rival ABS-CBN, leading to the launch of A2Z Channel 11 on October 10, 2020.

In anticipation of GMA News TV's departure from Channel 11, GMA Network swiftly planned to re-utilize DWDB-TV's UHF Channel 27. The intention was to cease the existing digital test broadcast on Channel 27 by May 27, 2019, and subsequently re-purpose the frequency to broadcast GMA News TV in analog by June 3, 2019, marking the station's return to analog television after 17 years of inactivity. This strategic move aimed to ensure continuity for GMA News TV's viewership.

However, GMA Network needed to allocate time for digital television viewers to re-scan their digital set-top boxes in order to continue accessing its channels under a new frequency assignment. As a result, the network postponed its official relaunch from June 3 to June 4.

The station successfully resumed analog broadcasting at 6:00 a.m. (PHT) on June 4, following a series of test transmissions conducted during off-air hours of its digital signal in the days leading up to the relaunch. With this return, the station also became the originating outlet of GMA News TV in Manila, serving as the primary feed station for its nationwide broadcast, alongside regional counterparts such as those in Cebu and Davao.

Meanwhile, the former channel missed the scheduled shut-off, leading to a temporary broadcast conflict between the two channels on that day. To mitigate the issue, the former channel gradually reduced its signal strength until it officially signed off on June 5, 2019.

=== Rebranding to GTV (since 2021) ===
After a 20-month separation from ZOE TV Channel 11, its original channel assignment since 2011, and nearly a decade of broadcasting as GMA News TV, the channel was officially relaunched as GTV on February 22, 2021. The rebranded network shifted to a broader format, encompassing news, entertainment, and sports programming, drawing similarities to the earlier models of Citynet Television and QTV. However, GTV retained select news programming from its predecessor, maintaining a strong news presence within its new identity.

The station signed on for the first time on February 22, 2021, using the GMA News TV sign-on and sign-off notices until the sequence was updated on February 27.

In November 2025, the National Telecommunications Commission (NTC) issued a memorandum circular that planned to switch off analog television in Mega Manila in 12 months. On July 17, 2026, GMA readied to switch off analog television in Mega Manila on the upcoming November 22.

The analog shutdown date was extended by the NTC on November 17, 2026, from the original November 22, 2026, it became January 15, 2027.

== Digital television ==
=== Digital channels ===
DWDB-TV's feed is now transmitted via the DZBB-TV digital subchannel, operating on the UHF DTT Channel 15 (479.143 MHz). The station broadcasts across the following 8 subchannels:

Channel	Video	Aspect	Short name	Programming	Note
7.01	480i	16:9	GMA	GMA (Main DZBB-TV programming)	Commercial broadcast (15,000 Kilo-Watts ERP)
7.02	480i	16:9	GTV	GTV (Main DWDB-TV programming)	Commercial broadcast (15,000 Kilo-Watts ERP)
7.03	480i	16:9	HEART OF ASIA	Heart of Asia Channel	Commercial broadcast (15,000 Kilo-Watts ERP)
7.06	480i	16:9	I HEART MOVIES	I Heart Movies	Commercial broadcast (15,000 Kilo-Watts ERP)
7.07	480i	16:9	(UNNAMED)	Reserved Channel	Color bars
7.08	480i	16:9	(UNNAMED)	Reserved Channel	Color bars
7.11	480i	16:9	(UNNAMED)	Reserved Channel	Color bars
7.21	240p	16:9	GMA 1-Seg	GMA	1seg broadcast

According to the December 31, 2017 press release, the station's upgraded signal transmission expanded its coverage to include the Metro Manila, Rizal, Cavite, Laguna, Bulacan, and parts of Pampanga, Bataan, Nueva Ecija, Batangas and Baguio City.

On April 24, 2019, The GMA Network & the Citynet announced that it would terminate its blocktime agreement with ZOE TV by the end of May 2019. The decision came after the release of GMA's June 2018 financial report, which revealed a significant increase in lease payments to ZOE over the past three years, rising from ₱899.90 million on December 31, 2016 to nearly one billion pesos by October 1, 2018. Third-party sources speculated that the Channel 11 Manila would begin simulcasting ZOE's sister station, Light TV Channel 33, following the termination of the agreement. However, ZOE had yet to issue an official statement regarding its future plans. Meanwhile, GMA News TV International's intellectual property, including master control, sales operations, and employees, was successfully transferred & scanned to DWDB-TV on June 3, 2019 at 23:58 on selected digital TV boxes, for the remainder of the final analog broadcast period.

On May 15, 2019, GMA Network began transmitting its digital test broadcast on the UHF Channel 15 (479.143 MHz), which was officially assigned as the permanent frequency issued by the National Telecommunications Commission.

On February 27, 2023, DWDB-TV's feed, along with GMA Network's other digital stations, began broadcasting in 16:9 widescreen format. This update marked the transition from the previous fullscreen resolution (4:3), improving reception across both analog and digital signals via free TV and various cable and satellite providers. This shift followed nearly 28 years of utilizing the older video picture resolution.

== Areas of coverage ==
=== Primary Areas ===
- Metro Manila
- Bulacan
- Cavite
- Laguna
- Rizal

=== Secondary Areas ===
- Portion of Pampanga
- Portion of Bataan
- Portion of Batangas
- Portion of Nueva Ecija

== See also ==
- GMA Network
- DZBB-TV
- QTV / Q
- GMA News TV
- GTV
- List of GTV stations
