= Sherwin Tugna =

Filipino politician

The Honourable Sherwin N. Tugna
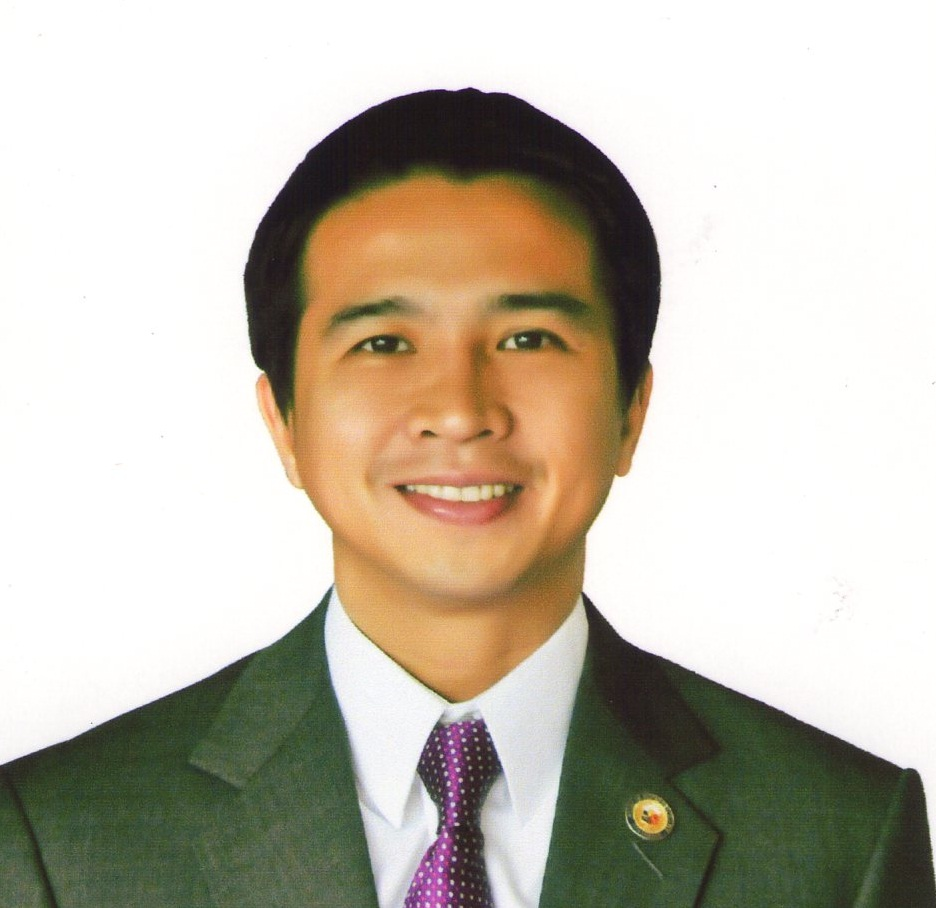

Vice Mayor of Bocaue
- Incumbent
- Assumed office June 30, 2022
- Mayor: Eduardo Villanueva Jr.
- Preceded by: Alvin Paul Cotaco

Member of the Philippine House of Representatives for Citizens' Battle Against Corruption
- In office June 30, 2010 – June 30, 2019 Serving with Cinchona Cruz-Gonzales (2010-2016)
- Preceded by: Joel Villanueva
- Succeeded by: Eddie Villanueva

Personal details
- Born: Sherwin Najito Tugna; October 15, 1977 (age 48)
- Party: NUP (2021–present)
- Other political affiliations: CIBAC (2009–2021)
- Spouse: Eleanor "Joni" Villanueva (m. 2002; died 2020)
- Children: 4
- Education: University of Santo Tomas (BS); Ateneo de Manila University (JD)
- Profession: Lawyer

Sherwin Najito Tugna (born October 15, 1977) is a Filipino lawyer, entrepreneur and public servant who is the vice mayor of Bocaue, Bulacan. He previously served as a representative for the Citizens’ Battle Against Corruption (CIBAC) party-list group from 2010 to 2019. He served his first term in the House of Representatives of the Philippines after CIBAC won two seats in the 2010 national elections. Tugna was one of the assistant majority leaders of the 15th Congress. He ran for his third term in Congress through CIBAC Party-List in the 2016 general election where his party won a seat, sending Tugna to the 17th Congress of the Philippines. As a third-term lawmaker, he became the Chairperson of the House Committee on Suffrage and Electoral Reforms (Journal #8).

== Early life ==
Sherwin Najito Tugna was born on October 15, 1977. He is the eldest of the two children of Sergio T. Tugna, a car repairman and Mila N. Tugna, a food vendor.

== Education ==
Tugna attended the University of Santo Tomas from grade school up to college. He graduated with a Bachelor of Science in commerce, Major in Economics degree in 1998. He was a member of the UST Varsity Football Team and competed in University Athletics Association of the Philippines (UAAP) tournaments.

After graduating from college, Tugna joined a pharmaceutical company and worked as a medical representative for 4 years before enrolling in the Juris Doctor program of the Ateneo School of Law of the Ateneo de Manila University where he graduated in 2006. He was accepted to the bar in 2007.

== Career ==
Before entering the political scene, Tugna worked for two private law firms: Angara Abello Concepcion Regala & Cruz Law Offices and Puyat Jacinto and Santos Law Office. In 2009, he set up his own law office, Tugna-Jala and Associates Law Firm in Ortigas, Pasig. Tugna, established the WineLean Transport Corporation, a taxi company.

=== CIBAC partylist representative (2010–2019) ===
Tugna was first elected into office in May 2010 and took his oath of office in August of the same year. He then became one of the Assistant Majority Floor Leaders of the 15th Congress and a member of the following Congressional committees:

- Rules

Assistant Majority Leader (Journal #18)

- Aquaculture and Fisheries Resources

Member for the Majority (Journal #20)

- Banks and Financial Intermediaries

Member for the Majority (Journal #22)

- Basic Education and Culture

Member for the Majority (Journal #20)

- Economic Affairs

Member for the Majority (Journal #72)

- Foreign Affairs

Member for the Majority (Journal #20)

- Good Government and Public Accountability

Member for the Majority (Journal #20)

- Government Enterprises and Privatization

Member for the Majority (Journal #20)

- Trade and Industry

Member for the Majority (Journal #29)

- Transportation

Member for the Majority (Journal #63)

==== Impeachment participation ====
Tugna was one of the lead prosecutors during the impeachment trial of Chief Justice Renato Corona from January 16 to May 29, 2012.

=== Vice mayor of Bocaue (2022–present) ===
In 2022, he successfully ran for vice mayor of Bocaue under the National Unity Party. He used the nickname "Mr. Mayor Joni" for the official ballot, after his late wife, former Mayor Joni Villanueva.

Tugna ran for vice mayor of Bocaue. Joni ran for and was elected mayor of Bocaue, Bulacan, in 2016, and was reelected in 2019. She died on May 28, 2020, from bacterial pneumonia.

== Personal life ==
Tugna married Eleanor Joni J. Villanueva on May 11, 2002. The couple has four children.

As an entrepreneur, Tugna owns and manages the Winelean Transport Corp., Bulacan P2P and Quality Hi-Fuel Incorporated.
