= Straight from the Shoulder (TV program) =

Philippine television public affairs show

- Title card
- Genre: Public affairs
- Presented by: Louie Beltran; Joe Taruc
- Country of origin: Philippines
- Original language: English

Production
- Camera setup: Multiple-camera setup
- Running time: 60 minutes
- Production companies: Manila Broadcasting Company; GMA News and Public Affairs

Original release
- Network: MBC-11 (1970–72); GMA Radio-Television Arts (January 14, 1987 – September 1994)
- Release: 1970 – September 1994

Straight from the Shoulder is a Philippine television and radio public affairs show broadcast by GMA Radio-Television Arts. Hosted by Louie Beltran, it premiered in 1970 on MBC-11 until in 1972. On January 14, 1987, it returned as a television show in GMA Network. A radio edition also aired on DZRH. The show concluded in September 1994, following Beltran's death.

== Accolades ==
Accolades received by Straight from the Shoulder
Year	Award	Category	Recipient	Result	Ref.
1988	2nd PMPC Star Awards for Television	Best Public Affairs Program	Straight from the Shoulder	Nominated	
1988	2nd PMPC Star Awards for Television	Best Public Affairs Program Host	Louie Beltran	Nominated	
1991	5th PMPC Star Awards for Television	Best Public Affairs Program	Straight from the Shoulder	Nominated	
1991	5th PMPC Star Awards for Television	Best Public Affairs Program Host	Louie Beltran	Nominated	
