= DZJV =

Philippine radio station

Radyo Calabarzon (DZJV)
Calamba; Philippines
- Broadcast area: Metro Manila, Calabarzon and surrounding areas
- Frequency: 1458 kHz
- Branding: DZJV 1458 Radyo Calabarzon

Programming
- Language: Filipino
- Format: News, Public Affairs, Talk, Religious Radio

Ownership
- Owner: ZOE Broadcasting Network
- Sister stations: DZOE-TV (A2Z); DZOZ-DTV (Light TV)

History
- First air date: 1995
- Call sign meaning: Jesus Victory

Technical information
- Licensing authority: NTC
- Power: 10,000 watts

Links
- Website: DZJV 1458

DZJV (1458 AM) Radyo Calabarzon is a radio station owned and operated by ZOE Broadcasting Network. Its studio and tower site are located at #140 Brgy. Parian, Calamba, Laguna.

== History ==
From April 2014 to March 2015, 8TriMedia Broadcasting occupied the 6PM to 10PM timeslot.
