= Channel V Philippines =

Music-entertainment TV network in the Philippines

- Country: Philippines

Programming
- Languages: English, Filipino

Ownership
- Owner: Fox Networks Group Philippines through Channel V Co-owners: GMA Network Inc. through Citynet Network Marketing and Productions (December 15, 1999 – July 25, 2001); TVXBC (March 1, 2009 – March 26, 2011); Northern Star Productions (April 26, 2011 – July 13, 2012)

History
- Launched: May 1994 (UHF 23); December 15, 1999 (UHF 27); March 1, 2009
- Closed: July 1996 (UHF 23); July 25, 2001 (UHF 27); July 13, 2012
- Replaced by: MTV Asia/Studio 23/S+A (UHF 23); GTV (UHF 27); Channel V Asia
- Former names: MTV Asia (UHF 23); EMC (Entertainment Music Channel) (UHF 27)

Channel [V] Philippines was a 24-hour music-entertainment television network owned by STAR TV and Fox Networks Group Philippines in partnership with TV Xtreme Broadcasting Company (formerly Makisig Network) and Northern Star Productions as network provider.

== History ==
=== Debut on UHF 23 ===
Channel V was first launched in 1994 in the Philippines, as MTV Asia made the decision to split from STAR TV and form its own satellite TV channel in Asia. It began airing on UHF Channel 23, licensed to Ermita Electronics Corporation, as the Philippines' first UHF TV station fully devoted to re-broadcasting a foreign satellite channel after MTV Asia was started as a music channel in 1992. It was started as the "Next Generation of Music" until it relaunched as Channel V. During that time, the actual feed was Channel V Chinese on AsiaSat 1 while the Asian/Indian counterparts were on AsiaSat 2 and Palapa C2, respectively.

Channel V in the Philippines aired only a few of the English-language shows like The Ride, Over The Edge, By Demand, Rewind, Asian Top 20, Billboard US Countdown and Sigaw Manila (with Filipino artists, locally co-produced by Probe Productions) but aired several of their Mandarin Chinese or Indian counterparts.

In the same year, the station launched the first ever Channel V Philippines VJ Hunt for aspiring Filipino VJs; it was won by Melanie Casul, the competition's first and last winner.

The channel left UHF 23 in July 1996, when EEC (the owner of the license) turned over to AMCARA Broadcasting Network, an ABS-CBN affiliate, creating Studio 23 (now known as ABS-CBN Sports+Action). The station is currently inactive since May 2020, after NTC release a cease and desist order on ABS-CBN after its franchise was relapsed, with its frequencies was taken over by Aliw Channel 23.

=== Move to UHF 27 ===
==== August 1995 ====
Before GMA Network officially launched Citynet Television in August 1995, GMA Network signed a contract with Star TV Network to broadcast selected taped Channel V International TV shows from 1995 until its closure in March 1999; the programs aired on Citynet included mentioned above except Sigaw Manila which was aired by TV5, other programs aired by Citynet were Speak Easy, Jump Start, and From The Boardroom. This programming made Trey Farley, Joey Mead, Amanda Griffin, Michael Zerrudo and the late Francis Magalona former VJ-TV hosts of part-Filipino descent, familiar to Citynet viewers. From 1998 until its closure in March 1999, Asian Top 20 Countdown was the only rebroadcast Channel V show.

==== December 1999 ====
On December 15, 1999, STAR TV leased the airtime of Citynet to launch Channel V Philippines through EMC, also known as Entertainment Music Channel. Part of the strategy to localize Channel V was with programming produced both by Star TV and GMA through Alta Productions and Probe Productions, Inc. The marketing image was shifted from music to more live-action products. Idents from this time frame used the brackets in the name. It dimensionalized the name Channel V, making it into an object that could then become an environment for its broadcast design and a stage for live events. Additional shifts in programming occurred at the relaunch, specifically a shift to genre-specific rather than continuous hits, with special graphics for each set. In the middle of 2001, Channel V Philippines shut down due to the intense competition from MTV Philippines provided by Nation Broadcasting Corporation, a PLDT sister company, when PLDT bought a controlling stake of GMA Network. The channel was officially shut down on July 25, 2001.

After 17 years of inactivity, UHF 27 was resurrected again and became the new flagship channel of GMA News TV which was re-established on June 4, 2019, after GMA Network's partnership with ZOE Broadcasting Network was terminated in May 2019, it was later rebranded to GTV.

=== Channel V returns to the Philippines ===
Eight years later, STAR TV (in turn was directly over to Fox Networks Group) and Makisig Network/Herma Group Inc (now known as TV Xtreme Broadcasting Company) announced an agreement to expand Channel V in the Philippines and to launch Tagalog-language content geared toward youth audiences, with an emphasis on local VJs, Pinoy music, and local bands and artists. Makisig now included Channel V International in its basic tier of cable channels, expanding the reach of the channel to more than 600,000 households across the Philippines. The channel's program mix is 60% Hong Kong satellite feed and 40% local feed versions of the more popular programs. Local content includes local-language and Pinoy music. The channel's creative director is Jose Javier Reyes.

Makisig continued to expand the reach of Channel V, moving it down from channel 59 to 25 on SkyCable and adding online content.

On March 26, 2011, Channel V Philippines went temporarily off-the-air after its CEO, then Ilocos Sur representative Ronald Singson, was jailed in Hong Kong for possession of illegal drugs. Channel V Philippines returned on Destiny Cable through Northern Star Productions (owned by Chavit Singson) until 2012.

== Channel V Philippines programs ==
Note: Some of the Channel V International programs also air on V Philippines with the V orange logo except from V Philippines produced programs only airs during night time, early morning and during commercials (V light blue logo).

=== Previous shows ===
- Backtrack Pinas
- Bente Uno
- Boys Night Out (also broadcast on Magic 89.9)
- Circuit TV
- Dyip Ni Juan
- Encore
- Filipino Poker Tour
- Hits All You Can
- In Command
- The G Spot
- PopKorn
- Scene and Heard Philippines
- Sound Reel
- V Buzz
- V Life
- V Scene
- V Trends
- V Tunes Pinas
- V'd Out
- V Tunes Pinas Live

== Channel V Philippines executives ==
- Luis "Chavit" Singson – Owner, Northern Star Production (Channel V Philippines)
- Rommel Singson – Channel Head
- Cora Dacong – overall in charge of production
- Arnel Balauro – Production Manager
- Jed Velasco – Events Head, Sales/Advertising
- Francis Quilantang – Production Head
- Joanna Cayanan – Head Writer
- Kimm Hadap – Events and Marketing Coordinator
- Kerstie Sorbito – Writer
- Angela Realica – Marketing
- Josh Garcia – Marketing

=== 2012 ===
- Judith Evaristo - Sales Director
- Angelo Valenzuela - Sales Manager
- Pam Reyes - Events and Marketing Manager
- Arnel Balauro – Production Manager
- Francis Quilantang – Production Head
- Kerstie Sorbito – Writer
- Angela Realica – Marketing Officer
- Mary Joy Simeon-Sales and Marketing Officer

== VJs ==
=== Previous VJs and program hosts ===
- Cliff Ho
- Megan Young
- Sanya Smith
- Kevin Cisco
- Trey Farley
- Joey Mead
- Melanie Casul
- Amanda Griffin
- Francis Magalona†
- Mike Zerrudo
- Brad Turvey
- Maxine Mamba
- Alvin Pulga
- Georgina Wilson
- Solenn Heussaff
- Marc Nelson (The Bro Code)
- Claudine Trillo (V Life)
- JR Issac (Circuit TV)
- Maike Evers (Filipino Poker Tour)
- Geoff Rodriguez (Filipino Poker Tour)
- Tim Yap (V Trends)
- Slick Rick (Boys Night Out)
- Sam Y.G. (Boys Night Out)
- Tony Toni (Boys Night Out)
- DJ Vince G (The G Spot)

== See also ==
- Channel V
- MTV Philippines
- MTV Pinoy
- Myx
- Citynet Television
