= Maike Evers =

- Born: 1980 (age 45–46); Australia
- Modeling information
- Height: 5 ft 7 in (170 cm)
- Hair color: Black
- Website: www.maikeevers.com

Maike Evers (born 1980) is a real estate professional in Vancouver, Canada. She is also a local TV personality, having been involved with Novus TV as a community channel presenter for a number of years while also engaged in her real estate work. She's a former MTV VJ born and raised in Australia to a German father and a Filipino mother. Evers is one of the more recognizable faces in the world of modeling in Asia, particularly in Southeast Asia and in China. She has done extensive television work, appearing in ads for various beauty products and shampoo brands in the Philippines, Indonesia, Thailand and China. She also has graced numerous print ads and magazines in Hong Kong and Southeast Asia including ELLE Thailand.

Evers had a brief stint as one of the video jocks on MTV Philippines. She has a degree from Australia, majoring in Social Science.

In 2009, she returned as a VJ, on Channel V Philippines.

She is currently hosting for Novus TV.
