= List of GTV (Philippine TV network) stations =

GTV logo

The following is a list of television stations that are affiliated with GTV, a Philippine TV network owned and operated by GMA Network. As of 2020, the network operates twenty-seven television stations with GTV Manila (DWDB-TV) as its originating station (shaded blue). It had former stations in Ilocos Sur, Tarlac, Bacolod, and Cagayan de Oro (as GMA News TV), which were under RGMA Network, Inc.

== Current free-to-air television stations ==
=== Analog Broadcast Stations ===
| Callsign | Branding | Ch. # (UHF) | TPO | Location (Transmitter Site) | Coordinates |
|---|---|---|---|---|---|
| DWDB | GTV Manila | 27 | 30 kW | Brgy. Culiat, Tandang Sora, Quezon City (Note: Flagship television station of GTV.) | 14°40′12″N 121°3′0″E |
| DWHH | GTV Ilocos Norte | 27 | 10 kW | Brgy. San Lorenzo, San Nicolas, Ilocos Norte (Note: Relay station) | 18°8′34″N 120°35′9″E |
| DWHK | GTV Tuguegarao | 27 | 1 kW | No. 91 Mabini St., Tuguegarao | 17°36′35″N 121°43′29″E |
| DWGP | GTV Aparri | 26 | 1 kW | Hi-Class Bldg., De Rivera St., Aparri, Cagayan | 18°21′15″N 121°38′31″E |
| DWDG | GTV Benguet | 22 | 10 kW | Mt. Santo Tomas, Tuba, Benguet | 16°20′7″N 120°33′40″E |
| DZRG | GTV Olongapo | 26 | 1 kW | Upper Mabayuan, Olongapo | 14°51′1″N 120°16′43″E |
| DZDK | GTV Batangas | 26 | 1 kW | Mt. Banoy, Brgy. Talumpok East, Batangas City | 13°42′21″N 121°10′21″E |
| DWHJ | GTV Occidental Mindoro | 26 | 1 kW | Bonifacio St., San Jose, Occidental Mindoro | 12°21′16″N 121°3′54″E |
| DWHI | GTV Puerto Princesa | 27 | 1 kW | Mitra Rd., Brgy. Sta. Monica, Puerto Princesa | 9°48′0″N 118°44′4″E |
| DWHL | GTV Masbate | 27 | 1 kW | Brgy. Pinamurbuhan, Mobo, Masbate | 12°20′40″N 123°38′29″E |
| DZDP | GTV Naga | 28 | 10 kW | Brgy. Concepcion Pequeña, Naga, Camarines Sur | 13°37′10″N 123°11′51″E |
| DWJB | GTV Legazpi | 27 | 10 kW | Mt. Bariw, Estanza, Legazpi, Albay | 13°6′58″N 123°43′38″E |
| DXBL | GTV Kalibo | 27 | 1 kW | Brgy. Bulwang, Numancia, Aklan | 11°43′5″N 122°21′41″E |
| DYBK | GTV Roxas | 27 | 1 kW | Brgy. Milibili, Roxas City | 11°33′38″N 122°45′44″E |
| DYKV | GTV Iloilo | 28 | 10 kW | Alta Tierra Subdivision, Jaro, Iloilo City | 10°44′28″N 122°33′53″E |
| DYLS | GTV Cebu | 27 | 50 kW | Mt. Busay Hills, Brgy. Babag, Cebu City | 10°21′49″N 123°51′13″E |
| DYBM | GTV Dumaguete | 28 | 1 kW | Brgy. Palinpinon, Valencia, Negros Oriental | 9°18′23″N 123°13′50″E |
| DYBJ | GTV Tacloban | 26 | 5 kW | Mt. Canlais, Brgy. Basper, Tacloban | 11°14′38″N 124°57′59″E |
| DXAV | GTV Dipolog | 26 | 1 kW | Linabo Peak, Dipolog | 8°35′20″N 123°23′31″E |
| DXAT | GTV Ozamiz | 22 | 1 kW | Bukagan Hill, Brgy. Malaubang, Ozamiz | 8°8′14″N 123°49′18″E |
| DXAU | GTV Pagadian | 26 | 1 kW | Mount Palpalan, Pagadian | 7°50′25″N 123°22′55″E |
| DXAW | GTV Surigao | 27 | 1 kW | Brgy. Lipata, Surigao City | 9°48′16″N 125°27′11″E |
| DXRA | GTV Davao | 27 | 40 kW | Shrine Hills, Matina, Davao City | 7°4′24″N 125°34′33″E |
| DXMP | GTV General Santos | 26 | 1 kW | Nuñez St., Brgy. San Isidro, General Santos | 6°8′19″N 125°10′45″E |
| DXVB | GTV Zamboanga | 21 | 10 kW | Brgy. Cabatangan, Zamboanga City | 6°56′59″N 122°3′23″E |
| DXMB | GTV Cotabato | 27 | 1 kW | Brgy. Rosary Heights V, Cotabato City | 7°12′40″N 124°15′1″E |
| DXGP | GTV Jolo | 26 | 1 kW | Ynawat Bldg., Hadji-Butu St., Jolo, Sulu | 6°2′59″N 120°59′58″E |

== Former free-to-air television stations (GMA News TV) ==
=== Analog Broadcast Stations ===
| Callsign | Branding | Channel (UHF) | TPO | Location (Transmitter Site) | Affiliate |
|---|---|---|---|---|---|
| DWRK | GNTV Ilocos Sur | 40 | 1 kW | Mt. Caniao, Bantay, Ilocos Sur (Note: Relay station) | RGMA Network, Inc. |
| DWRA | GNTV Tarlac | 28 | 1 kW | Exclusively His Bldg., F. Tanedo St. cor. Espinosa St., Tarlac City | RGMA Network, Inc. |
| DYRA | GNTV Bacolod | 48 | 3 kW | iSecure Bldg., Rizal St. cor. Locsin St., Bacolod | RGMA Network, Inc. |
| DXBA | GNTV Cagayan De Oro | 43 | 5 kW | Malasag Heights, Brgy. Cugman, Cagayan de Oro | RGMA Network, Inc. |

== See also ==
- List of GMA Network stations
- List of GMA Network radio stations
- List of Philippine television networks
- List of Philippine media companies
