= Q (Philippine TV network) =

Defunct free-to-air television network in the Philippines

- Final logo used by Q from 2010 to 2011.
- Type: Broadcast television network
- Country: Philippines
- Owner: GMA Network Inc. (Citynet Network Marketing and Productions Inc.); ZOE Broadcasting Network
- Key people: Eddie Villanueva, Chairman, ZOE-TV; Felipe Gozon CEO, GMA Network, Inc. Gigi Santiago-Lara, AVP-Alternative Programming, GMA Network
- Launch date: November 11, 2005; 20 years ago
- Dissolved: February 20, 2011 (5 years, 3 months and 9 days)
- Former names: On UHF Channel 27: Citynet Television (1995–1999); Entertainment Music Channel (1999); Channel V Philippines (1999–2001)
- Language: Filipino (main); English (secondary)
- Replaced by: GMA News TV

Q (formerly and sometimes called QTV) was a television network in the Philippines run by GMA Network Inc. through Citynet Network Marketing and Productions, Inc. The network primarily aired lifestyle and entertainment programs particularly aimed towards women. Its flagship station was DZOE-TV, which GMA ran as part of a lease with its owner, ZOE Broadcasting Network (who also aired programming on Q's schedule as part of the agreement, which also granted it access to technical resources from GMA).

On February 20, 2011, Q was discontinued in preparation for the launch of a new secondary network, GMA News TV, which later rebranded to GTV on February 22, 2021.

== History ==
Q launched on November 11, 2005 as QTV (standing for Quality TeleVision), a network primarily targeting women with a mix of local and international lifestyle and entertainment programming. Its main Metro Manila stations were DZOE-TV (leased by GMA from ZOE Broadcasting Network) and the GMA-owned DWDB-TV (a UHF translator previously operating as Citynet 27). On March 18, 2007, QTV rebranded itself simply as "Q".

=== Relaunch as GMA News TV ===
On February 7, 2011, GMA Network announced that Q would be replaced by the news channel GMA News TV (now GTV). Q's programming officially ended on February 20. The network then broadcast under the temporary "Channel 11" branding, airing teasers for the relaunch from February 21 to 25. It signed off completely on February 26 and 27 to prepare for its formal re-launch as GMA News TV on February 28.

== Final programming ==
Some of Q's programming consists of Filipino and English-language programming, and additional programming produced by GMA.

== See also ==
- Television in the Philippines
- ZOE Broadcasting Network
- A2Z
- GMA Network
- GTV
