= Delta Broadcasting System =

Philippine media company

Delta Broadcasting System, Inc.
- Type: Private
- Industry: Religious; Broadcasting
- Founded: August 20, 1981; 44 years ago
- Founder: Mike Velarde
- Headquarters: Queensway Commercial Center Building, 118 Amorsolo Street, Legaspi Village,, Makati, Metro Manila, Philippines
- Key people: Bro. Mike Velarde (Chairman); Mariano Michael Velarde Jr. (General Manager)
- Parent: El Shaddai
- Website: www.deltabroadcastingsystem.com

Delta Broadcasting System, Inc. (DBS) is a Filipino broadcast media arm of the owned by El Shaddai leader Bro. Mike Velarde, based in Makati, Philippines. Its studios and offices at the Queensway Commercial Center Building, 118 Amorsolo Street, Legaspi Village, Makati. It registered at the Securities and Exchange Commission on March 2, 1992. It operates DWXI 1314 kHz AM, an AM radio station which is started in 1981, and DBS TV Channel 35, a UHF television station.

== History ==
In 1981, at the height of Mike Velarde's real estate business expansion around what is now Ninoy Aquino International Airport, Bro. Mike bought the DZSA 1314, an AM Radio Station from its owner-operators for ₱ 2 million, because he needed the parcel of land on which it stood. Besides, the owners would not sell the land unless the radio station was included in the deal. Later, the radio station alone would cost him millions more to sustain its operations.

In 1995, DBS TV was launched on VHF Channel 11, featuring religious programs, including El Shaddai. In 1998, ZOE Broadcasting Network, led by Jesus is Lord leader Eddie Villanueva, acquired Channel 11, prompting DBS TV to relocate to UHF Channel 35. Around 2004, it ceased broadcasting due to low ratings and financial constraints, though its radio broadcasts continued on DWXI-AM.

On September 15, 2012, during the Weekly Family Appointment with El Shaddai at Amvel City, Bro. Mike announced that DBS had secured TV equipment for its revival. On July 14, 2016, DBS TV-35 resumed operations on a test broadcast, though with a weak signal, primarily reaching viewers in Cavite, Laguna, Batangas, and southern Metro Manila by airing past Family Appointment with El Shaddai episodes. On December 4, 2016, during the 28th anniversary of El Shaddai DWXI PPFI Hong Kong Chapter, Bro. Mike stated that the station was expected to fully return in January 2017, but plans were halted due to insufficient studio and transmitter facilities.

On April 30, 2019, during the Tuesday Family Appointment with El Shaddai, Bro. Mike announced that the channel would transition to full digital terrestrial television (DTT), following the approval of its franchise renewal by the Philippine Congress. Earlier, on April 17, 2019, Congress passed Republic Act No. 11303, extending Delta Broadcasting System, Inc.'s franchise for another 25 years, allowing it to continue operating radio and television stations across the Philippines.

== DBS stations ==
=== Digital (Inactive) ===
Branding	Callsign	Channel	Frequency	Power	Location
DBS TV Manila	DWDE	35	599.143 MHz	1 kW	Metro Manila

=== Radio stations ===
Branding	Callsign	Frequency	Power	Location
DWXI	DWXI	1314 kHz	50 kW	Metro Manila
