= GMA News TV =

Philippine television network

- 2D logo from February 28, 2011 until February 21, 2021 (Philippines)
- Type: Broadcast television network
- Country: Philippines

Programming
- Languages: Filipino (main); English (secondary)

Ownership
- Owner: GMA Network Inc.
- Parent: Citynet Network Marketing and Productions
- Key people: Felipe L. Gozon (Chairman and Adviser, GMA Network); Gilberto R. Duavit Jr. (President and CEO, GMA Network); Felipe S. Yalong (Executive Vice-President for CFO, GMA Network); Lilybeth G. Rasonable (Senior Vice-President for Entertainment Group, GMA Network); Marissa L. Flores (Senior Vice-President for News and Public Affairs, GMA Network); Elvis B. Ancheta (Senior Vice President, GMA Engineering)

History
- Launched: February 28, 2011; 15 years ago
- Closed: February 21, 2021; 5 years ago (Philippines)
- Replaced by: A2Z (VHF 11 channel space); GTV (UHF 27 channel space)
- Former names: UHF 27: Citynet Television (1995–99); Entertainment Music Channel (EMC) (1999); Channel [V] Philippines (1999–2001); VHF 11: ZOE TV (1998–2005); QTV / Q (2005–11)

GMA News TV (GNTV; visually rendered in uppercase in its logo) is a 24-hour Philippine-based international pay television channel owned by Citynet Network Marketing and Productions Inc., a wholly owned subsidiary of GMA Network Inc. It was originally launched in the Philippines on February 28, 2011, as a domestic free-to-air television network, replacing Q. The international pay television channel, GMA News TV International, was launched later in 2011.

Despite in conflicts of blocktime programs during pre-COVID-19 pandemic era (e.g. The World of Gandang Ricky Reyes and #MichaelAngelo series) and intense competition with other minor television networks, GMA News TV ended its Philippine broadcast operations on February 22, 2021, to make way for GTV. GMA News TV International was renamed GMA News TV and continues to broadcast.

== History ==
GMA News TV was created as a replacement for "Q", a network that primarily featured imported dramas and lifestyle-oriented programming aimed at women. It was also part of GMA News and Public Affairs' plans to expand its presence on free-to-air television. GMA News TV was unveiled on February 7, 2011, during GMA Network's flagship newscast 24 Oras. Q was discontinued on February 20, 2011, in preparation for the launch of the new service, which occurred on February 28, 2011.

Until 2019, ZOE Broadcasting Network served as an originating affiliate and flagship station for GMA News TV due to a block time lease agreement between ZOE Broadcasting and GMA's subsidiary Citynet Network Marketing and Productions in 2005. This agreement allowed Citynet to lease the entire airtime of DZOE-TV 11 Manila in exchange for upgrading ZOE's facilities and providing an off-peak time slot for its programs on Channel 11 and GMA Network. However, due to increasing lease payments and decreased revenues for GMA Network, the two networks announced on April 24, 2019, that they would terminate the agreement by the end of May 2019. As a result, GMA News TV Manila was reassigned to analog Channel 27, which had been used for GMA Network's digital test broadcasts, on June 4. Consequently, GMA's DTV operations were transferred to a permanent frequency, UHF Channel 15 (479.143 MHz), which had been used since May 15.

On July 27, 2019, GMA News TV premiered its first and only English-language news broadcast, GMA Regional TV Weekend News (now Regional TV Weekend News). The broadcast switched to Filipino on September 12, 2020.

In line with the enhanced community quarantine imposed due to the COVID-19 pandemic outbreak, GMA News TV temporarily went off the air on March 19, 2020. The channel returned on March 21, 2020, with limited broadcasting hours. On April 13, 2020, the channel resumed its regular primetime programming after 24 Oras, and its full programming was restored by September 21.

=== Programming changes and rebranded as GTV ===
On November 21, 2020, an article published by its affiliate news portal, Sports Interactive Network, reported that GMA Network announced plans to possibly reformat GMA News TV into a sports and entertainment channel, similar to the old formats of Citynet Television and QTV. The plans were unveiled following GNTV's gradual shift away from its original news channel format toward general entertainment and sports since September 2020. This shift included the acquisition of broadcast rights to NCAA and PSL games, a simulcast of its sister digital channel Hallypop, and additional entertainment programs from its parent station, GMA Network, due to an increase in commercial load. These changes drew negative reactions from viewers, particularly when news coverage was put on hold for entertainment programs during the Typhoon Goni crisis in the Philippines.

On February 9, 2021, the network announced that GMA News TV would be rebranded as GTV on February 22, less than a week before the 10th anniversary of GNTV's launch.

To reflect the change, GMA News TV's presentation was dramatically overhauled on February 22, 2021. It was replaced by GTV, which also featured news, entertainment, and sports programs.

The "GMA News TV" brand has since been used for the international channel, with the word "International" being dropped after 10 years.

== Final programming ==
Most of GMA News TV's programming consisted of news and public affairs programs produced by GMA News and Public Affairs. Outside of its core programming, the channel aired entertainment programs, including lifestyle and cooking shows, talk shows, local and foreign dramas, comedies, reality series, travel shows, foreign animated series, local and foreign movie blocks, sports programs, and additional content produced by GMA.

== Availability ==
GMA News TV was broadcast via regular free-to-air television on Channel 27 in Metro Manila, Cebu, Davao, and 28 other regional stations nationwide. In addition to GNTV's main analog signal, it was a must-carry channel on all cable and satellite TV providers across the country. The channel was also available as a digital subchannel through GMA's main digital transmitters in Metro Manila, Baguio, Batangas, Cebu, and Davao.

== GMA News TV International ==
GMA News TV International
- Logo used since 2021
- Country: Philippines
- Broadcast area: Worldwide
- Network: GMA Network; GTV
- Headquarters: GMA Network Center, EDSA cor. Timog Ave. Diliman, Quezon City, Metro Manila, Philippines

Programming
- Languages: Filipino; English (subtitles)
- Picture format: 720p/1080p HDTV (downscaled to 16:9 480i/576i for the SDTV feed)

Ownership
- Owner: GMA Network, Inc.
- Parent: GMA International
- Sister channels: GMA Network; GTV; Heart of Asia Channel; I Heart Movies; GMA Pinoy TV; GMA Life TV

History
- Launched: July 1, 2011; 15 years ago

Links
- Website: GMA News TV International Facebook Page

Availability

Terrestrial
- OSN TV (United Arab Emirates): Channel 715
- SingTel TV (Singapore): Channel 690

Later in 2011, GMA Network launched a 24-hour international version called GMA News TV International to complement its other two international channels, GMA Pinoy TV and GMA Life TV. Unlike its domestic counterpart, programs on GMA News TV International aired with a delay (except for selected special events such as live coverage of Day 1 of Eleksyon 2013), and the timepiece in the lower-left corner of the screen was covered.

It began to be offered as a preview channel in Australia on FetchTV, IPS/AccessTV in Japan, GUdTV in Guam, Zuku TV in Kenya, and on OSN, with an official launch planned for the third quarter of 2011.

GMA News TV International was officially launched on UBI World TV on December 1, 2011. In May 2012, Canadian IPTV provider MTS TV added GMA News TV International, becoming its first Canadian carrier. In November 2012, Optik TV also added the channel to its lineup. Additionally, GMA News TV International became available on Singtel TV. The channel was officially launched on Starhub TV in January 2019, along with GMA Pinoy TV and GMA Life TV.

In Hong Kong, GMA News TV International was launched on Now TV in June 2015.

In Europe, Australia, and New Zealand, GMA News TV International (along with GMA's other international channels) is available through the over-the-top streaming service Lyca TV.

Despite the rebranding of GMA News TV as GTV on February 22, 2021, in the Philippines, the international version will continue using its original name.

On April 26, 2023, ABS-CBN Corporation and GMA Network, Inc. announced that GMA News TV would be available on ABS-CBN's iWantTFC for viewers outside of the Philippines starting May 1, alongside GMA Pinoy TV and GMA Life TV.

== See also ==
- Citynet Network
- List of television stations in the Philippines
- GTV
