= Mike Velarde =

Filipino television evangelist

- Title: Servant Leader

Personal life
- Born: Mariano Zuniega Velarde Caramoran, Catanduanes, Republic of the Philippines
- Spouse: Avelina del Monte (m.1964)
- Children: 4

Religious life
- Religion: Roman Catholic
- Institute: El Shaddai
- Profession: Real estate developer

Senior posting
- Based in: San Dionisio, Parañaque, Metro Manila
- Period in office: 1984–present

Mariano Zuniega "Bro. Mike" Velarde is a Filipino televangelist and founder of El Shaddai, a Catholic charismatic movement in the Philippines. The movement reportedly has a following estimated between three and seven million members.

He is also the owner of Amvel Land Development Corporation, a real estate company, and Delta Broadcasting System.

== Personal life ==
Brother Mike is married to Avelina "Belen" del Monte and they have four children: Franklin, Rene, Sherry, and Michael. Velarde's son Rene Velarde, represents the Buhay party-list. His son, Franklin, is an investor in the Puyat-controlled Manila Bank.

His son, Mariano Michael Velarde Jr. was appointed deputy director general of the Technical Education and Skills Development Authority in 2019. He currently serves in El Shaddai as the assistant servant leader.

== Theology ==
Brother Mike began his involvement with Charismatic Christianity together with the late Russian-Filipino actor-turned-evangelist Ronald Remy who eventually founded the Corpus Christi Community, an Evangelical congregation now known as Lord Jesus Our Redeemer (LJOR) Church. Velarde, having experienced and been exposed to the Charismatic movement, decided to remain within the Roman Catholic Church. In 1984, he founded the El Shaddai movement which has become an eclectic expression of Philippine folk Christianity, the Charismatic movement, and Roman Catholicism. Velarde remains a layman within the Roman Catholic Church.

His preaching style is no different from typical prosperity gospel-driven Pentecostal televangelists. It promises God's financial and physical blessings to all provided that they remain faithful in attendance to gatherings, giving their tithes and offerings, and obedience. Part of Velarde's practical theology is the use of certain inanimate objects such as handkerchiefs, bankbooks, and umbrellas, which are held aloft during services.

== Politics ==
Brother Mike, over the years, has endorsed political candidates.

In 2022, he endorsed Bongbong Marcos for the presidential candidacy.

== Filmography ==
=== Television ===
- El Shaddai (1992–present)
- Mga Himala at Gintong Aral ni El Shaddai (1994–1997)

=== Films ===
- Bro. Mike's Miracles are Forever (2016)

== See also ==
- El Shaddai
- Prosperity Gospel
- Televangelism
