= A2Z (TV network) =

Philippine free-to-air television network

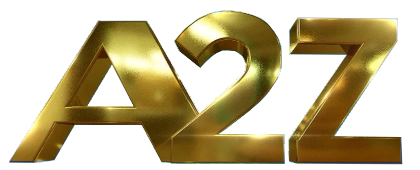
- Type: Broadcast commercial television network
- Country: Philippines
- Broadcast area: Nationwide
- Network: ABS-CBN; ZOE TV
- Headquarters: For ABS-CBN; ABS-CBN Broadcasting Center, Sgt. Esguerra Ave., corner Mo. Ignacia Ave, Diliman, Quezon City, Metro Manila, Philippines; For ZOE; 22nd floor, Strata 2000 Bldg., F. Ortigas Jr. Road, Ortigas Center, Pasig, Metro Manila, Philippines

Programming
- Languages: Filipino (main); English (secondary)
- Picture format: 16:9 480i (SDTV)

Ownership
- Owner: ABS-CBN Corporation (Master Control, Broadcast Feed, or Content Scheduling); ZOE Broadcasting Network (Broadcast Spectrum and License)
- Sister channels: Under ZOE; Light TV; Under ABS-CBN; All TV (via AMBS); Kapamilya Channel; Knowledge Channel; Jeepney TV; DZMM TeleRadyo; DZMM Radyo Patrol 630; 92.3 FM Radio Manila; Metro Channel; Cine Mo! Cinema One; ANC; Myx; TFC

History
- Launched: October 6, 2020; 6 years ago (test broadcast); October 10, 2020; 6 years ago (official launch)
- Replaced: ABS-CBN (second iteration, post-martial law) (1986–2020); QTV / Q / GMA News TV (2005–2019) and ZOE TV (1998–2005) (VHF 11 channel space); O Shopping (Sky Cable channel space)
- Former names: ZOE TV/Light TV (1998–2005; 2020); QTV/Q and GMA News TV (2005–2019)

Links
- Website: www.abs-cbn.com A2Z Official Facebook Page

Availability

Terrestrial
- Analog / Digital terrestrial television: Listings may vary
- SkyCable Metro Manila: Channel 11
- SkyTV Metro Manila: Channel 11
- Sky Direct Nationwide: Channel 7
- Cignal TV Nationwide: Channel 20
- SatLite Nationwide: Channel 20
- G Sat Nationwide: Channel 36
- Cablelink Metro Manila: Channel 104

A2Z is a Philippine free-to-air blocktime broadcast television network based in Quezon City, with its studios located in Ortigas Center, Pasig. It serves as a flagship property of ZOE Broadcasting Network, the broadcast media arm of Jesus Is Lord Church Worldwide, in partnership with ABS-CBN Corporation as its main content provider through a blocktime agreement (now under an airtime lease since 2022). The network's name is an abbreviation derived from the first letter of the names of two media companies, ABS-CBN and ZOE, and the channel number of the now-recalled frequency of the former network (which is now owned by Advanced Media Broadcasting System's All TV that also airs Kapamilya Channel programming since April 15, 2024).

A2Z's flagship television station is DZOE-TV which operates on channel 11 (analog broadcast), and channel 20 (digital broadcast) using the main ABS-CBN/Kapamilya Channel playout on most broadcasts except parts using A2Z's own feed independent from the former where a silent break bumper is shown between product placements and network advertisements similar to the 1986–2014 ABS-CBN playout, making A2Z the first ABS-CBN's semi-mirror free TV feed of the main cable channel before All TV on April 15, 2024.

== History ==
=== ZOE TV-11 ===
DZOE-TV Channel 11, also known as ZOE TV-11, was launched in 1998 after being acquired from Delta Broadcasting System. It served as the television arm of Jesus is Lord Church led by Eddie Villanueva. In 2005, ZOE TV-11 was leased by Citynet Network Marketing and Productions, subsidiary of GMA Network, to serve as originating station for its secondary television networks QTV/Q and GMA News TV (now GTV). However, on April 24, 2019, GMA/Citynet announced that it will terminate its blocktime agreement with ZOE Broadcasting by the end of May 2019. The split comes after the release of GMA's 2018 financial report which declared the increasing lease payments that the network contributes to ZOE for the past three years (from ₱899.89 million in 2016 to almost a billion pesos in 2018). GMA News TV disaffiliated from ZOE TV-11 on June 4, 2019, before the channel signed off the next day.

On June 22, 2020, ZOE TV-11 returned on air and carried the feed of Light TV as part of its test broadcast operations, but on June 26, the simulcast was replaced by Hillsong Channel, which is owned by Trinity Broadcasting Network, before reverting to Light TV feed on July 11. It was rumored to be part of marketing the channel to either possibly continuing the analog simulcast of their sister station UHF 33 or for the airtime leasing.

=== ABS-CBN shutdown and agreement rumors ===
On May 5, 2020, the broadcast operations of ABS-CBN Corporation, including Channel 2, ABS-CBN Sports and Action, DZMM Radyo Patrol, My Only Radio, all digital television channels of ABS-CBN TV Plus (on June 30), direct broadcast via satellite of Sky Direct (on June 30) and AMCARA (on June 30) were all put off the air after the National Telecommunications Commission (NTC) and Solicitor General Jose Calida issued a series of cease-and-desist orders demanding ABS-CBN to immediately cease all of its free-to-air television and radio broadcasting upon the expiration of its legislative broadcast franchise. The Congress rejected ABS-CBN's application for franchise renewal on July 10, and the NTC recalled all the broadcast frequencies assigned to ABS-CBN on September 10. ABS-CBN resumed its broadcast programming through the launch of cable and satellite television network Kapamilya Channel on June 13, where it carried ABS-CBN's local dramas, live entertainment shows and news programming before the May 5 stoppage.

Since 2017, ZOE Broadcasting Network and ABS-CBN Corporation were reportedly holding talks for possible airtime lease of Channel 11 or acquisition of the network itself if the issues regarding ABS-CBN's now-expired broadcast franchise were ever floated. Reports of a blocktime agreement between ABS-CBN and ZOE began to surface after the Congress rejected ABS-CBN franchise renewal in July 2020, with a tentative schedule offering for broadcasting 20 hours of airtime on Channel 11, and ABS-CBN programs were shopped to air on ZOE TV. The programs of ABS-CBN News and Current Affairs were initially declined to broadcast on Channel 11 by the ZOE management due to editorial concerns until January 1, 2022, when TV Patrol officially began the simulcast of its weekend edition, and its regular edition on January 3, marking its return to free-to-air television, almost two years since the newscast made its final broadcast on the original Channel 2.

=== Launch and broadcasting ===
On October 6, 2020, through separate statements, ABS-CBN and ZOE TV publicly announced the blocktime agreement and rebranding of Channel 11 into A2Z, more than a year after being disaffiliated from GMA News TV (now GTV) and five months after the Channel 2 shutdown. The announcement came a day after Sky Cable, ABS-CBN's cable television arm, added ZOE TV 11 to the channel lineup.

Meanwhile, a month after the launching of A2Z, the National Telecommunications Commission (NTC) was reportedly investigating ABS-CBN and ZOE Broadcasting Network to determine if the said blocktime agreement of the two stations were processed in legal ways.

On November 12, 2020, A2Z began its broadcast on digital terrestrial television. The channel is available on most digital TV boxes.

=== Partnership with PCMC and digital terrestrial expansion ===
On September 18, 2021, A2Z entered a partnership agreement with Philippine Collective Media Corporation for affiliation to broadcast the network via Channel 12 in selected parts of Eastern Visayas. In January 2022, the National Telecommunications Commission granted a provisional authority for ZOE, to utilize UHF channel 20 for its DTT operations; this allowed the network to transmit both A2Z and its sister channel Light TV terrestrially outside Metro Manila.

In January 2025, A2Z Cebu station was upgraded as a semi-satellite, serving as originating broadcaster of weekly local magazine show Bisaya Ni produced by ABS-CBN Regional (its first program since July 2020) and it is being distributed to its sister stations in Visayas and Mindanao.

== Programming ==
As part of the agreement between ABS-CBN and ZOE TV, the list of all television original programming by A2Z focuses on entertainment and news programs produced by ABS-CBN from Kapamilya Channel, serving as its main free-to-air broadcast affiliate. In addition, similar to its previous airtime lease with GMA/Citynet for Channel 11, A2Z features content from ZOE TV's sister station Light TV and its content partners CBN Asia and Trinity Broadcasting Network. An independent late-night newscast Balitang A2Z and afternoon bulletin Ulat A2Z is also shown every weekdays.

== Broadcast stations ==
A2Z operates its local owned and operated or affiliate television stations across 7 key areas in the Philippines, including its flagship DZOE-TV (A2Z Manila). The network has 4 owned and operated relay stations and one affiliate relay station in Tacloban and one semi-satellite station in Cebu City.

=== Free-to-air broadcast stations ===
Callsign	Channel	Type	Transmitter Site
DZOE	11 (analog); 20 (digital)	Originating	Antipolo
DWBJ	32 (digital)	Relay	Tuba, Benguet
DYZA	20 (digital)	Relay	Jordan, Guimaras
DYNZ	20 (digital)	Semi-Satellite	Cebu City
DYPR	12 (analog); 50 (digital)	Affiliate	Tacloban
DXEV	20 (digital)	Relay	Cagayan de Oro
DXEX	20 (digital)	Relay	Davao City

== See also ==
- ZOE Broadcasting Network
- ABS-CBN Corporation
- ABS-CBN
- Light TV
- Kapamilya Channel
- All TV
- DZOE-TV
- QTV/Q
- GMA News TV
