= Eddie Villanueva =

Filipino evangelist, preacher, and politician

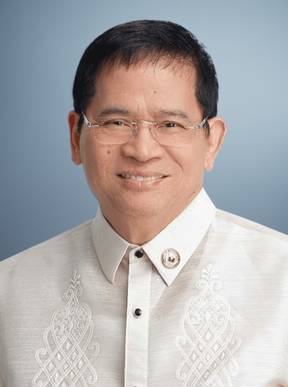
- Official portrait, 2025

Deputy Speaker of the House of Representatives of the Philippines
- In office July 22, 2019 – June 30, 2022
- House Speaker: Alan Peter Cayetano; Lord Allan Velasco

Member of the House of Representatives for CIBAC
- Incumbent
- Assumed office June 30, 2019 Serving with Domingo Rivera (2019–2022)
- Preceded by: Sherwin Tugna

Personal details
- Born: Eduardo Cruz Villanueva; October 6, 1946 (age 79) Bocaue, Bulacan, Philippines
- Party: Bangon Pilipinas (2004–present)
- Other political affiliations: CIBAC (Party-list; 2018–present)
- Spouse: Adoracion Jose Villanueva (m. 1971; died 2020)
- Children: 4, including Joel
- Education: Philippine College of Commerce (BCom); University of the Philippines Diliman
- Website: broeddie.ph

Eduardo Cruz Villanueva (/vɪljɑːnuːwɛbɑː/, born October 6, 1946), most commonly referred to as Bro. Eddie Villanueva or ECV, is an evangelist and President and Spiritual Director of the Jesus Is Lord Church Worldwide (JILCW).

Villanueva was previously a communist, radical activist, and street parliamentarian. During the martial law regime under former President Ferdinand Marcos, he was imprisoned twice for fighting alongside the oppressed for their rights against land grabbing syndicates.

Villanueva is also the founder of the Philippines for Jesus Movement (PJM), which has more than forty bishops from different Christian churches nationwide as members.

Villanueva was a presidential candidate in the 2004 and 2010 Philippine elections and a senatorial candidate in the 2013 midterm Philippine elections, all as the standard bearer of the Bangon Pilipinas Party.

Villanueva is a radio-TV evangelist owning ZOE Broadcasting Network, a commercial television and radio broadcasting station which owns VHF Channel 11 (A2Z) and UHF Channel 33 (Light TV).

He is also the owner and founder of the Jesus Is Lord Colleges Foundation, Inc. (JILCF), a Christian school in Bocaue, Bulacan, where his late wife, Dr Adoracion Villanueva was the school president.

He is currently a member of the 19th Congress of the Philippines and has been a Deputy Speaker of the House of Representatives in the 18th Congress.

== Early life ==
Eduardo Cruz Villanueva was born on October 6, 1946, in Bocaue, Bulacan, to parents Joaquin Villanueva and Maria Cruz. Joaquin Villanueva was a former Olympic sprinter who represented the Philippines in the Far Eastern Games for four consecutive years in 1920s.

=== Education ===
In 1969, Villanueva graduated with a degree in commerce, majoring in economics, from the Philippine College of Commerce (PCC), since renamed the Polytechnic University of the Philippines. He was immersed in both student and labor movements in the 1970s, joining the progressive segments of society which opposed Marcos' dictatorship. Villanueva also took up law at the University of the Philippines College of Law but was already into so much activism that he never had time to take the bar examination. During Martial law, he fought local landgrabbers in Bulacan and ended up being jailed twice for his political beliefs and participation in various mass actions.

He worked as a full-time faculty member in the Economics and Finance Department of PCC until 1972. He then worked as the export manager of Maran Export Industries in 1973 and from 1976 to 1977, he was the general manager of the Agape Trading Co. He returned to PCC, now renamed, in 1978 as a part-time professor.

== Religious ministry ==
Before establishing the Jesus Is Lord Church Worldwide (JILCW), Villanueva professed that he was an atheist.

According to their church's website, Villanueva claimed to have "had a life-changing encounter with the Lord in 1973 while at the forefront of a leftist movement". At that time, he was also leading his family (and other families) in his home province of Bulacan in an uphill, protracted legal battle as he himself became a victim of a notorious land-grabbing syndicate. Five days after that "dramatic encounter with God", Villanueva was brought face to face with a miracle he could never forget: the land-grabbers were arrested and detained.

On October 5, 1978, Villanueva founded the JILCW formerly named Jesus Is Lord Fellowship, "which started with just 15 members from his Bible studies". In 2007, JIL stated it had "over five million members today in 18 cities in Metro Manila, 80 provinces in the Philippines and 60 countries in the world. Most members abroad are overseas Filipino workers and their families."

== Political career ==
=== 2004 presidential bid ===
Villanueva campaigned in the 2004 Philippine presidential election.

Despite the polls done by Social Weather Stations and Pulse Asia showing him trailing among the four contenders, Villanueva was confident that he would win the elections saying that "this is why we do not believe in the surveys of the two companies that are usually commissioned by political parties here — because the more than three million human bodies (at my rally) can indicate the real results of the survey."

=== 2010 presidential bid ===
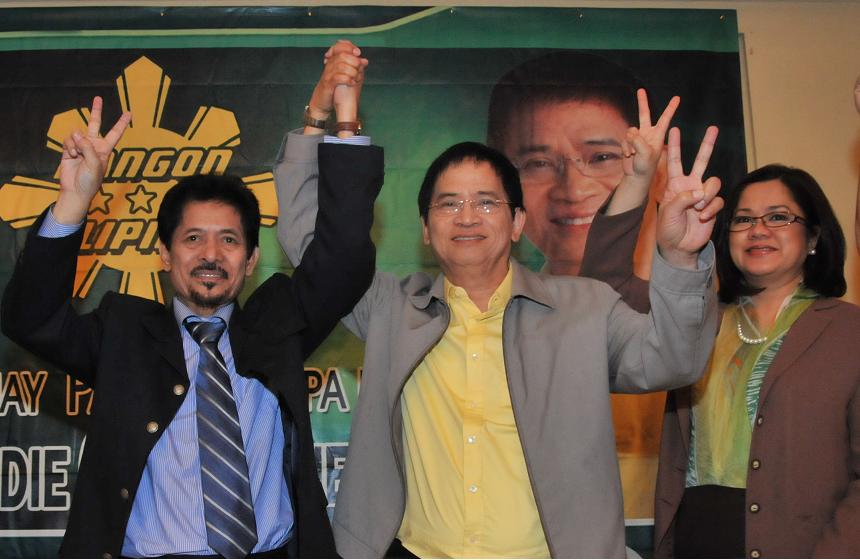
Eddie Villanueva together with Autonomous Region in Muslim Mindanao (ARMM) governor Nur Misuari and broadcast journalist Kata Inocencio during his 2010 presidential campaign under the Bangon Pilipinas

Villanueva ran again for the 2010 presidential election where he lost for the second time; he finished fifth out of nine presidential candidates with 1,125,878 votes or 3.12% of the total votes far from the winner, Benigno Aquino III.

=== 2013 Senate bid ===
Villanueva ran for a Senate seat in 2013 as a standalone candidate of Bangon Pilipinas. However, he lost, finishing 19th out of the 12 seats up for election with 6,932,985 votes.

== Political positions ==
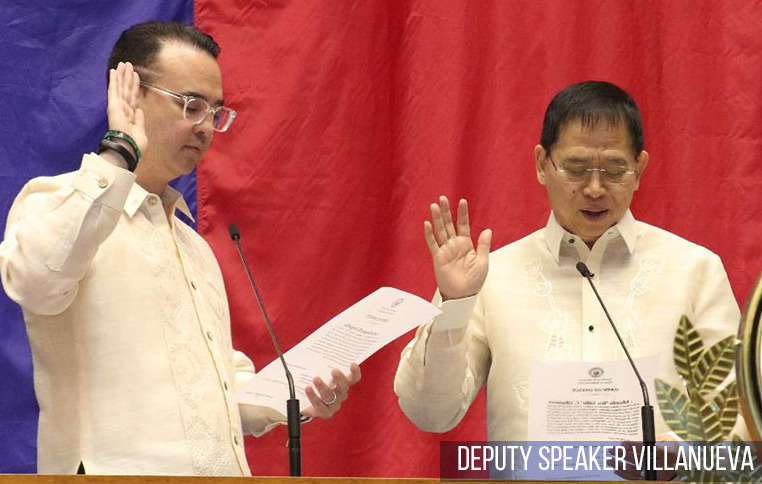
Villanueva taking his oath of office as Deputy House Speaker on July 27, 2019

=== On homosexuality ===
Villanueva is against same-sex marriage; he said in an interview, "According to the Bible, don't imitate what happened in Sodom and Gomorrah because judgment will befall on the country if it's done".

=== On political dynasty and trapo politics ===
When Villanueva was still a "bishop", he was asked about his family's position on political dynasties. Villanueva responded, “Political dynasty is not applicable to our family.” He cited their so-called “advocacy” as enough reason for their family to be exempted from being tagged as a political dynasty. He continued, “For example, you are a family, your parents raised you with love for the country. If you have five siblings and one of them served the country first, shouldn’t the other four have the right to serve?”

Villanueva allegedly approved the renaming after her daughter of Bocaue's municipal sports center, into the “Mayor Joni Villanueva Tugna Sports Center”, which Vera Files deemed inappropriate as public funds, not the Villanueva family's personal money, were used to build the center.

== Awards and recognitions ==
Villanueva was ordained Minister of the Gospel of the Lord Jesus Christ in 1979 by the California-based Victory in Christ Church and International Ministries. He has also been conferred the office of Episcopacy by the Sectarian Body of Christ in the Philippines in April 1996. Two months later, Villanueva received the Gintong Ama (Golden Father) award for Socio-Civic/Religious Sector from the Golden Mother and Father Foundation in June 1996.

In February 2001, Villanueva received the EDSA People Power Freedom Award for ZOE TV 11 for its fair coverage of the People Power II movement. He founded and owns ZOE Broadcasting Network Inc. and operates Channel 11 on Filipino television. Bro. Eddie hosts three ZOE programs, Diyos at Bayan, PJM (Philippines for Jesus Movement) Forum and Jesus The Healer.

== Personal life ==
He married Dr. Adoracion "Dory" Villanueva (née Jose) on June 5, 1971, and their marriage lasted until her death on March 10, 2020. They have four children together. Their eldest son, Eduardo "Jon-Jon" Villanueva, Jr., is the incumbent mayor of Bocaue, Bulacan. Jonjon was charged with murder for allegedly ordering the shooting of a soldier of the Armed Forces of the Philippines during the May 2007 elections. Their other son, Sen. Joel Villanueva, is currently a Senator, Senate Majority Leader, and became the youngest member of the House of Representatives when he took his oath of office as a representative of the CIBAC partylist on February 6, 2002. Their daughter, Joni Villanueva-Tugna, was a Christian singer, TV host, and Mayor of Bocaue from July 2016 until her death on May 28, 2020. She was married to Sherwin Tugna, a former CIBAC partylist representative. Their other daughter, Edelisha Jovi, is an educator.

== Electoral history ==
Electoral history of Eddie Villanueva
Year	Office	Party	Votes received				Result
Year	Office	Party	Total	%	P.	Swing	Result
2004	President of the Philippines	BPP	1,988,218	6.16%	5th	—N/a	Lost
2010	President of the Philippines	BPP	1,125,878	3.12%	5th	-3.04	Lost
2013	Senator of the Philippines	BPP	6,932,985	17.27%	19th	—N/a	Lost
2019	Representative (Party-list)	CIBAC	929,718	3.33%	4th	—N/a	Won
2022	Representative (Party-list)	CIBAC	637,044	1.75%	10th	-1.58	Won
2025	Representative (Party-list)	CIBAC	593,911	1.42%	10th	-0.33	Won
