= Jesus Is Lord Church =

Church in the Philippines

- Classification: Evangelical
- Founder: Eddie Villanueva
- Origin: October 5, 1978
- Other name: Jesus Is Lord Church Worldwide
- Official website: jilworldwide.org

Jesus Is Lord Church Worldwide (JILCW), or more commonly known as Jesus Is Lord Church (JIL), is a Christian megachurch based in the Philippines. It describes itself as a Full Gospel, Christ-centred, and Bible-based church, with over one million members in 60 countries as of 2023. Most members abroad are overseas Filipino workers and their families.

Originating in Manila, it now holds its main services in Ortigas Center, Polytechnic University of the Philippines-Manila, Greenhills, San Juan, and Bocaue, Bulacan.

== History ==
The Jesus Is Lord Church (JIL) began in 1978 when Eddie Villanueva, a former atheist, activist, and professor, gathered with 15 Bible study members at the Polytechnic University of the Philippines (then known as Philippine College of Commerce). As professor of Economics and Finance at the university, Villanueva preached the Gospel to his students.

From 15 students, JIL has grown to over one million members and has planted churches all over the Philippines and in other countries in neighboring Asian countries, Europe, Australasia, the Americas, the Middle East, and Africa. JIL is also reaching many millions more through its TV, radio, literature, video ministries, ICare, the JIL Christian Schools/JIL Colleges Foundation, Inc. and through the JIL

== Ministries ==
=== Life Group Network ===
The Life Group Network (LGN) is an arm of the JIL ministry. Lifegroups are small groups that cater to the needs of specific age groups: the Children's Net, the Kristiyanong Kabataan para sa Bayan (Christian Youth for the Nations), the Young Adults Network, the Men's Net and the Women's Net.

==== Legal issues ====
In February 2024, Jaymie Cando, a 17-year-old yellow belt varsity team member of the Jesus Is Lord Colleges Foundation (101 Bunlo, Bocaue) Taekwondo team, suffered severe facial injuries, including a broken nose, facial contusion, and swelling on her upper lip and jaw after an allegedly forced sparring session with a taekwondo black belter. Fermida Salvador said that Jaymie, her daughter, "endured coach Jerry Salvador, Jr.’s improper acts to keep scholarship". In an April 2, 2024 phone interview on Wanted sa Radyo on 92.3 Radyo5 True FM (now 105.9 True FM), Cando, in her affidavit, alleged in detail "the actions of the coach, including offers to massage her aching muscles after practice; she claimed that her coach forced her to have the sparring session with Antonio Joaquin, a black belter, who’s taller and 20 kilos heavier than her." The Philippine Taekwondo Association and JILCF conducted their separate investigations into the controversy.

== See also ==
- List of the largest Protestant bodies
