= D-4-XT-TV =

GMA TV-4 Dipolog (D-4-XT-TV)
Relay of DXMJ-TV
- Philippines
- City: Dipolog
- Channels: Analog: 4 (VHF); Digital: 15 (UHF) (ISDB-T); Virtual: 4.01
- Branding: GMA TV-4 Dipolog

Programming
- Subchannels: See list

Ownership
- Owner: GMA Network, Inc.
- Sister stations: DXAV-TV (GTV)

History
- First air date: 1998
- Former channel numbers: Digital: 46 (UHF, 2024—25)

Technical information
- Licensing authority: NTC
- Power: Analog: 1 kW; Digital: 5 kW
- Transmitter coordinates: 8°35′20″N 123°23′31″E

Links
- Website: GMANetwork.com

D-4-XT-TV (Analog TV-4; Digital DTV-15) is a television station in Dipolog City, Philippines, airing programming from GMA Manila and GMA Davao. It is owned and operated by the network's namesake corporate parent alongside GTV outlet DXAV-TV (channel 26). Both stations share transmitting facilities atop Linabo Peak, Lugdungan, Dipolog.

== History ==
D-4-XT-TV first signed on in 1998 as part of GMA Network's expansion in Zamboanga del Norte. The callsign follows Philippine broadcast conventions, with "D" as the prefix for all national broadcast stations, "4" referring to its assigned analog channel, and "XT-TV" specifying its television relay function. D-4-XT-TV is owned and operated by GMA Network itself, serving primarily as a relay to extend the network's reach to the Zamboanga Peninsula region and also served as one of the network's owned-and-operated (O&O) stations in the Philippines. The station received regulatory approval from the National Telecommunications Commission (NTC), enabling its operations as part of the network's broader expansion efforts in Mindanao.

Early infrastructure development focused on establishing a reliable transmission setup, with the initial transmitter sited at Linabo Peak in Dipolog City to optimize signal coverage across Zamboanga Peninsula. This location was chosen for its elevated terrain, facilitating broadcast to underserved areas in Zamboanga del Norte and surrounding provinces.

In addition to its primary relay duties, D-4-XT-TV shares facilities with its sister station DXAV-TV, which operates as GTV in the same Dipolog area, supporting GMA Network's diversified broadcasting presence.

From its inception, D-4-XT-TV's programming centered on relaying national content from GMA-7 Manila, including news, entertainment, and public affairs shows, to provide local audiences with timely access to mainstream Philippine media without initial production of original regional content. This relay function addressed the geographical challenges of the region, bridging the gap in television accessibility.

The station's operations are tied to GMA Network's broader regional structure, with administrative and content oversight coordinated from the company's headquarters at the GMA Network Center in Quezon City. GMA Network, Inc., a publicly listed entity since 2007 with primary control held by the Gozon, Duavit, and Jimenez families through affiliated holding companies, ensures unified management across its O&O stations like D-4-XT-TV.

In the 2010s, GMA Network invested in digital infrastructure across its regional stations, including upgrades to support ISDB-T transmission. For D-4-XT-TV in Dipolog, a key development occurred in 2018 with the erection of a new 90-foot self-supporting antenna tower at its Linabo Peak facility, enhancing signal reliability and facilitating the integration of digital broadcasting capabilities. This upgrade was part of GMA's wider Mindanao expansions, such as the 5 kW digital terrestrial television broadcast (DTTB) station in Matina, Davao City, commissioned that same year to bolster regional coverage.

In 2013, D-4-XT-TV was integrated as a relay facility with the new GMA Northern Mindanao originating station, reinforcing GMA's presence in Zamboanga del Norte. This was followed by the development of local programming, including the 2017 launch of One Mindanao, GMA Davao's first local news program for Mindanao audiences. As part of the network's Regional TV division, the station operates under the centralized control of the parent company, which maintained 108 TV transmitter stations nationwide as of 2023, including 12 dedicated GMA regional outlets for local programming and news integration.

D-4-XT-TV maintains primary affiliation with the GMA Network, relaying national feeds from GMA-7 Manila alongside regional content sourced from GMA TV-5 Davao to serve audiences in Zamboanga del Norte. This affiliation structure allows the station to broadcast GMA's flagship programming, including news, dramas, and public affairs shows, while integrating local regional elements under GMA Integrated News. It is branded as GMA TV-4 Dipolog, reflecting its alignment with the network's "Kapuso" identity.

In August 2024, following the national adoption of the ISDB-T standard for digital terrestrial television by the National Telecommunications Commission (NTC) in June 2010 through Memorandum Circular No. 02-06-2010, D-4-XT-TV (as a GMA Network affiliate) began aligning with the country's broader shift from analog to digital broadcasting; hence assigned the station to UHF Channel 46 in the Dipolog area. This standard enabled improved signal quality, high-definition content, and multichannel capabilities, allowing stations like D-4-XT-TV to prepare for simulcasting analog and digital signals during the transition period. By 2025, D-4-XT-TV's digital signal changed its frequency to UHF Channel 15.

In November 2025, the NTC mandated an analog switch-off by November 2026, prompting continued investments in digital facilities for D-4-XT-TV and other GMA affiliates to achieve full ISDB-T compliance and subchannel expansions for enhanced programming diversity. This includes potential power increases and multiplex additions to extend coverage in Zamboanga del Norte amid the nationwide push for complete digitalization.

== GMA TV-4 Dipolog current programs ==
All of the following programs are relayed from GMA Davao:

- One Mindanao
- Word of God Network

== GMA TV-4 Dipolog former programs ==
- Testigo Northern Mindanao
- 24 Oras Northern Mindanao
- Newscope
- Northern Mindanao Isyu Karon
- Isyu ug Istorya
- Let's Fiesta
- Visita Iglesia
- Biyaheng DO30
- At Home with GMA Regional TV

== Digital Television ==
=== Digital channels ===
D-4-XT-TV's digital signal operates on UHF Channel 15 (479.143 MHz) and broadcasts on the following subchannels:

LCN	Video	Aspect	Name	Programming	Note
4.01	480i	4:3	GMA	GMA Dipolog	Commercial Broadcast
4.02	480i	4:3	GTV	GTV	Commercial Broadcast
4.03	480i	4:3	HEART OF ASIA	Heart of Asia	Commercial Broadcast
4.06	480i	4:3	I HEART MOVIES	I Heart Movies	Commercial Broadcast
4.21	240p	4:3	GMA 1-Seg	GMA Dipolog Relay	1seg

== Areas of Coverage ==
- Zamboanga del Norte

== See also ==
- DZBB-TV
- DXMJ-TV
- List of GMA Network stations
