= DXDZ-DTV =

GMA Mindanao (DXDZ-DTV)
Semi-satellite of DXMJ-TV Davao
- Cagayan de Oro; Philippines
- Channels: Digital: 47 (UHF); Virtual: 12.01

Programming
- Subchannels: 12.01: GMA; 12.02: GTV; 12.03: Heart of Asia; 12.06: I Heart Movies; 12.21: GMA 1-Seg

Ownership
- Owner: GMA Network, Inc.
- Sister stations: Barangay LS 100.7 Cagayan de Oro

History
- First air date: June 12, 1976; 50 years ago
- Last air date: February 4, 2013; 13 years ago (analog TV broadcast)
- Former call signs: DXDZ-TV (1976–2013)
- Former channel numbers: Analog: 12 (VHF, 1976–2013)
- Former affiliations: Digital subchannels: Hallypop (2020-2024); DepEd TV (2021-2022); Pinoy Hits (2023-2024)

Technical information
- Licensing authority: NTC
- Power: Digital: 10 kW
- Transmitter coordinates: 8°27′9″N 124°42′12″E

Links
- Website: GMANetwork.com

DXJC-TV
Semi-satellite of DXMJ-TV Davao
- Cagayan de Oro; Philippines
- Channels: Analog: 35 (UHF)
- Branding: GMA TV-35 Cagayan de Oro

Ownership
- Owner: GMA Network, Inc.

History
- First air date: 2009
- Former affiliations: Q (2009-2011); GMA News TV (2011-2012)

Technical information
- Licensing authority: NTC
- Power: 10 kW TPO (analog)
- Transmitter coordinates: 8°27′9″N 124°42′12″E

DXDZ-DTV (channel 47) is a digital-only television station in Cagayan de Oro, Philippines, airing programming from GMA network. It is owned and operated by the network's namesake corporate parent, alongside GMA analog feed outlet DXJC-TV, TV-35 (Analog). Both stations share studios at the 2/F Centro Mariano Bldg., Sergio Osmeña St., Brgy. 31, Cagayan de Oro City, Misamis Oriental, while its hybrid analog and digital transmitting facility is located at the, Malasag Heights, Barangay Cugman, sharing with Barangay LS 100.7.

== History ==
- June 12, 1976 - DXDZ-TV Channel 12 began commercial broadcasts as the first television station in Northern Mindanao. At that time, DXDZ-TV was launched under the ownership of Republic Broadcasting System, using the “GMA Radio-Television Arts” branding. The station then operating with a 350-watt transmitter and 8 hours of daily programming.
- April 30, 1992 - Following the network's expanded coverage, DXDZ-TV Channel 12 became part of the Rainbow Satellite Network launch. This marked the beginning of GMA’s nationwide satellite broadcast, delivering live Manila-based national programming from its flagship station, DZBB-TV, to viewers across Northern Mindanao.
- 2009 - GMA Cagayan de Oro was upgraded to a satellite station serving Northern Mindanao, following the earlier expansions in Bacolod, General Santos and Naga. At the time, the station operated from its former studio located on the second floor of the Hotel Conchita Building, at the corner of Guillermo and Yacapin Streets.
- February 2012 - GMA Cagayan de Oro expanded its reach further with the launch of its relay station on UHF Channel 35. This development included the premiere of its regional public affairs program Northern Mindanao: Isyu Karon. Before this, the frequency had been used for Q (formerly QTV), GMA’s sister channel, which launched in 2009, and subsequently rebranded as GMA News TV on February 28, 2011.
- January 23, 2013 - In time for the 2013 midterm elections, GMA Cagayan de Oro was officially upgraded to a “super station” and rebranded as GMA Northern Mindanao. This upgrade significantly expanded its reach, making the station available not only in Cagayan de Oro but also across the provinces of Bukidnon, Camiguin, Misamis Oriental, Misamis Occidental, and parts of Bohol. Its signal also covered areas in Lanao del Norte, Lanao del Sur, Compostela Valley, North and South Cotabato, Sultan Kudarat, Agusan del Norte and Sur, Surigao del Norte and Sur, Zamboanga del Sur, and Maguindanao. Prior to its launch, the network invested PHP 200 million for the upgrade of the station's studios and facilities.
- February 5, 2013 - GMA Northern Mindanao's operations shifted its frequency to Channel 35 as the network's main analog feed, later with new callsign DXJC-TV. This move coinciding with the launch of its flagship regional newscast, Testigo Northern Mindanao. As a result, the station's analog broadcasting was inactive on VHF channel 12 a day before due to channel interference with GMA TV-12 Mt. Kitanglad, which is also receivable in Cagayan de Oro and portion of Misamis Oriental.
- April 24, 2015 - GMA Northern Mindanao ceased local programming after its regional newscast was abruptly cancelled— just over two years since its original launch— as part of a strategic streamlining initiative affecting all GMA regional stations. The cancellation resulted in the retrenchment of staff and on-air personalities, and ultimately led to the closure of the station’s regional news department. Since then, the station has been airing primarily Manila-based programming via GMA’s flagship station, DZBB-TV Channel 7.
- August 28, 2017 - After a two-year hiatus from producing local news content, GMA Northern Mindanao resumed regional news coverage by co-producing and simulcasting One Mindanao, the network's first Mindanao-wide newscast. This marked the station’s transition to a semi-satellite of GMA Davao.
- December 15, 2020 - After 7 years of inactivity, DXDZ-TV resumed broadcasting through digital terrestrial television (DTT) as the station commenced ISDB-T digital test broadcasts on UHF Channel 47. The digital signal covers Metro Cagayan de Oro, the provinces of Misamis Oriental and Camiguin, and parts of Bukidnon, marking a significant step toward full digital transition.

== Currently aired local programs ==
- One Mindanao

== Previously aired local programs ==
- Newscope
- Isyu Karon Northern Mindanao
- Let's Fiesta
- Testigo Northern Mindanao
- 24 Oras Northern Mindanao
- Isyu ug Istorya
- Visita Iglesia
- At Home with GMA Regional TV
- Biyaheng DO30
- Word of God Network

== On-air staffs ==
=== Current ===
- Cyril Chaves
- James Paolo Yap

=== Former ===
- Kenneth Ragpala
- Joe Legaspina
- Jeik Compo
- Joane Tabique-Abesamis
- Jacky Cabatuan
- Pia Abas
- Christian Gonzales
- Kaye Mercado
- Francis Damit
- Clyde Macascas
- Ethel Ipanag
- PJ Dela Peña (formerly from ABS-CBN Cagayan de Oro; now with Provincial Public Information Office)

== Subchannels ==
Subchannels of DXDZ-DTV
Subchannel	Res.	Name	Programming
12.01	480i	GMA	GMA
12.02	480i	GTV	GTV
12.03	480i	HEART OF ASIA	Heart of Asia
12.06	480i	I HEART MOVIES	I Heart Movies
12.21	240p	GMA 1SEG	GMA (1seg)

== Area of coverage ==
- Portions of:
  - Bohol
  - Bukidnon
  - Camiguin
  - Misamis Oriental (including cities of Cagayan de Oro and El Salvador)

== See also ==
- DXMJ-TV
- DXLX-FM
- GMA Network
- List of GMA Network stations
