= 1999 in Philippine television =

The following is a list of events affecting Philippine television in 1999. Events listed include television show debuts, finales, cancellations, and channel launches, closures and rebrandings, as well as information about controversies and carriage disputes.

== Events ==
- February 7- Professional basketball leagues MBA and the PBA hold separate opening ceremonies to usher their respective new seasons. ABS-CBN's musical variety show ASAP broadcast live via ABS-CBN and Studio 23 from the Cuneta Astrodome in Pasay City and the University of St. La Salle Coliseum in Bacolod City for the MBA, while Vintage Television and GMA Network collaborated for the opening ceremonies of the PBA, which aired live on IBC-13.
- July 30 – Eat Bulaga! marks its 20th year anniversary.
- December 31 - Philippine television marks the turning of the century in a big way as it heralds the dawn of the New Millennium.
  - PTV Network hosts the telecasts of the national millennium festivities held in the Rizal Park in Manila led by President Joseph Estrada.
  - GMA Network airs nationwide the national edition of the successful 2000 Today broadcast, with celebrations centering at the Makati Central Business District. At around 11:50pm, Regine Velasquez sang the Philippine Millennium theme song, "Written in the Sand", live at the top of The Peninsula Manila.
  - ABS-CBN hosts its own celebration coverage, focused not just on concerts of its big network talents in three venues within: Quirino Grandstand, the Quezon Memorial Circle (Quezon City), and The Fort in Bonifacio Global City (Taguig), but also on news reports of the celebrations from all over the country and the world as the new year and new century arrives. Within minutes to midnight, the network airs a special identity card marking the change to the new century with the introduction of its current logo, set to Ryan Cayabyab's music which the network would later adopt as the startup and closedown tune until 2006. The marathon telecast was originally the national edition of Millennium Live, which was cancelled days before due to lack of funding from most of the international TV networks that joined the project, but was finally pushed through as a series of international broadcasts by some of the partner channels.

== Premieres ==
| Date | Show |
|---|---|
| January 2 | F! on ABS-CBN 2 |
| January 9 | Loren on ABS-CBN 2 |
| January 11 | Cinderella on ABS-CBN 2 |
| January 11 | Mobile Suit Gundam Wing on GMA 7 |
| January 11 | Remi, Nobody's Girl on ABS-CBN 2 |
| January 15 | Voltes V on GMA 7 |
| January 15 | Daimos on GMA 7 |
| January 15 | Golympics on GMA 7 |
| January 16 | Alas Singko Y Medya Weekend on ABS-CBN 2 |
| January 17 | Power Rangers In Space on ABS-CBN 2 |
| January 18 | Akazukin Chacha on ABS-CBN 2 |
| January 18 | i-Witness on GMA 7 |
| January 20 | Mazinger Z on GMA 7 |
| January 24 | Hapi Kung Healthy on IBC 13 |
| January 30 | Transformers Original on ABC 5 |
| January 30 | Visionaries on ABC 5 |
| February 8 | Marinella on ABS-CBN 2 |
| February 8 | Nagmamahal Pa Rin Sa'yo on ABS-CBN 2 |
| February 13 | Fastbreak on IBC 13 |
| February 13 | G-mik on ABS-CBN 2 |
| February 14 | Cheche Lazaro Presents on GMA 7 |
| February 15 | Rio Del Mar on GMA 7 |
| February 15 | Extra Extra on GMA 7 |
| February 16 | TEXT (The Extreme Team) on GMA 7 |
| February 24 | L on GMA 7 |
| March 1 | Fortune Quest on ABS-CBN 2 |
| March 1 | Ghost Fighter on GMA 7 |
| March 6 | Ang Munting Paraiso on ABS-CBN 2 |
| March 6 | Tarajing Potpot on ABS-CBN 2 |
| March 8 | Blue Blink on ABS-CBN 2 |
| March 10 | Ooops! on GMA 7 |
| March 10 | Mikee Forever on GMA 7 |
| March 10 | Beh Bote Nga on GMA 7 |
| March 11 | Travel Time on Studio 23 |
| March 14 | Tabing Ilog on ABS-CBN 2 |
| March 15 | Breakfast on Studio 23 |
| March 15 | Hyper Speed GranDoll on GMA 7 |
| March 20 | Ispup on ABC 5 |
| April 5 | Sa Sandaling Kailangan Mo Ako (Book 2) on ABS-CBN 2 |
| April 10 | Gabay sa Mabuting Asal on GMA 7 |
| April 12 | Saan Ka Man Naroroon on ABS-CBN 2 |
| April 24 | Mighty Ducks: The Animated Series (Disney Adventures) on GMA 7 |
| April 24 | Aladdin (Disney Adventures) on GMA 7 |
| April 24 | 101 Dalmatians: The Series (Disney Adventures) on GMA 7 |
| May 17 | Di Ba't Ikaw on GMA 7 |
| June 1 | Epol/Apple on ABS-CBN 2 |
| June 7 | Chabelita on ABS-CBN 2 |
| June 7 | TV Patrol Central Mindanao on ABS-CBN TV-5 Cotabato |
| June 13 | The Buzz on ABS-CBN 2 |
| June 21 | Lost Universe on ABS-CBN 2 |
| July 5 | TV Patrol Butuan on ABS-CBN TV-11 Butuan |
| July 5 | TV Patrol Iligan on ABS-CBN TV-4 Iligan |
| July 12 | Sky Ranger Gavan on ABC 5 |
| July 24 | Alas Dose sa Trese on IBC 13 |
| July 27 | Pasugo: Ang Tinig ng Iglesia ni Cristo on Ultravision 25 |
| July 27 | Pilot Guides on Ultravision 25 |
| July 27 | The Message on Ultravision 25 |
| August 2 | Labs Ko Si Babe on ABS-CBN 2 |
| August 7 | Esep-Esep on ABS-CBN 2 |
| August 9 | Lupin III on GMA 7 |
| August 10 | Flame of Recca on GMA 7 |
| August 16 | Kirara, Ano ang Kulay ng Pag-ibig? on GMA 7 |
| August 16 | Isami on ABS-CBN 2 |
| August 16 | Pulso: Aksyon Balita on ABS-CBN 2 |
| August 16 | The Rescue Kids on GMA 7 |
| August 16 | Frontpage: Ulat ni Mel Tiangco on GMA 7 |
| August 16 | Saksi on GMA 7 |
| September 4 | Pintados on GMA 7 |
| September 4 | GMA Love Stories on GMA 7 |
| September 4 | Guyferd on ABC 5 |
| September 8 | Pwedeng Pwede on ABS-CBN 2 |
| September 13 | Judy Ann Drama Special on ABS-CBN 2 |
| September 19 | Knight Hunters on GMA 7 |
| September 20 | Samurai X on ABS-CBN 2 |
| October 1 | Pokémon on GMA 7 |
| October 4 | Ratsada on GMA Iloilo |
| October 4 | Balitang Bisdak on GMA 7 Cebu |
| October 4 | Testigo on GMA 5 Davao |
| October 11 | ANC Headlines on ABS-CBN News Channel |
| October 23 | Digital LG Quiz on GMA 7 |
| October 24 | Bongga! on GMA Iloilo |
| October 24 | Singgit Cebu on GMA 7 Cebu |
| October 24 | Singgit Davao on GMA 5 Davao |
| October 25 | Tenchi-Muyo on ABS-CBN 2 |
| November 1 | Online Bingo Filipino on PTV 4 |
| November 26 | Combattler V on GMA 7 |
| December 4 | Click on GMA 7 |
| December 6 | Unang Hirit on GMA 7 |
| December 6 | Liwanag ng Hatinggabi on GMA 7 |
| December 6 | Neon Genesis Evangelion on ABS-CBN 2 |
| December 8 | Codename: Verano on GMA 7 |
| December 9 | Gintong Pangarap on ABC 5 |
| December 12 | Super Klenk on GMA 7 |
| December 13 | D! Day on GMA 7 |
| December 13 | Maynila on GMA 7 |
| December 27 | Doraemon on GMA 7 |

=== Unknown ===
- ABS-CBN & Unilever: Pamilyong Papremyo sa Pamilya on ABS-CBN 2
- MIB: Mga Imbestigador ng Bayan on ABS-CBN 2
- Pipol on ABS-CBN 2
- Fora Medica on PTV 4
- How 'Bout My Place on RPN 9
- Tipong Pinoy on RPN 9
- Felicity on RPN 9
- Lingkod Bayan ni Tony Falcon on IBC 13
- Back to Iskul Bukol on IBC 13
- Friends Again on IBC 13
- Batang Batibot on GMA 7
- PBA Classics on UltraVision 25
- Pilot Guides on UltraVision 25
- The Message on UltraVision 25
- Thunderstone on Ultravision 25
- Job Network on PTV 4
- Kasangga on GMA 7
- Comedy Central Market on GMA 7
- Best Friends on GMA 7
- Koko Kwik Kwak on GMA 7
- INC on GMA: Gabay sa Mabuting Asal on GMA 7
- Teletubbies on GMA 7
- Campus Video on GMA 7
- One Cubed on GMA 7
- TV Shopper on GMA 7
- Inhumanoids on ABC 5
- Fiveman on ABC 5
- Watch U Want on Channel V Philippines
- New Idea TV Shopping on RJTV 29 & CTV 31
- Sine VTV on IBC 13
- Pygmalio on ABC 5
- G.I. Joe on ABC 5
- La Viuda de Blanco on ABC 5
- Beetle Fighters on RPN 9
- Pablo the Little Red Fox on GMA 7
- Ultraman Dyna on GMA 7
- Ultraman Tiga on GMA 7

== Returning or renamed programs ==
| Show | Last aired | Retitled as/Season/Notes | Channel | Return date |
|---|---|---|---|---|
| National Basketball Association | 1998 | Same (1998–1999 season) | February 5, 1999 | |
| Batibot | 1999 | Batang Batibot | GMA | Unknown |

== Programs transferring networks ==
| Date | Show | No. of seasons | Moved from | Moved to |
|---|---|---|---|---|
| January 15 | Voltes V | —N/a | RPN | GMA Network |
| January 25 | Yaiba | —N/a | ABC | ABS-CBN |
| March 1 | Ghost Fighter | —N/a | IBC | GMA Network |
| March 11 | Travel Time | —N/a | GMA Network | Studio 23 |
| September 20 | Samurai X | —N/a | Studio 23 | ABS-CBN |
| October 11 | The World Tonight | —N/a | ABS-CBN | ABS-CBN News Channel |
| November | Gameplan | —N/a | GMA Network | Studio 23 |
| December 6 | Neon Genesis Evangelion | —N/a | ABC | ABS-CBN |
| Unknown | Ang Dating Daan | —N/a | IBC | RJTV |
| Unknown | Sky Ranger Gavan | —N/a | RPN | ABC |

== Finales ==
- January 8: GoBingo (GMA 7)
- January 11: Firing Line (GMA 7)
- January 15: Kassandra (ABS-CBN 2)
- January 29: Mukha ng Buhay (RPN 9)
- February 1: Sa Sandaling Kailangan Mo Ako (ABS-CBN 2)
- February 6:
  - Gimik (ABS-CBN 2)
  - Takot Ka Ba Sa Dilim? (IBC 13)
- February 9: Hiwalay Kung Hiwalay Daw (GMA 7)
- February 12: Tierra Sangre (RPN 9)
- February 17: Growing Up (GMA 7)
- February 20: Sabado Live! (ABS-CBN 2)
- February 26:
  - Ms. D! (GMA 7)
  - Halik sa Apoy (GMA 7)
- March 3:
  - Mikee (GMA 7)
  - Si Tsong, Si Tsang (GMA 7)
  - L (GMA 7)
- March 6: Dear Heart (IBC 13)
- March 7: Kapag May Katwiran, Ipaglaban Mo! (ABS-CBN 2)
- March 13: Tropang Trumpo (ABC 5)
- March 19: Hyper Speed GranDoll (GMA 7)
- March 26: Super Laff-In (ABS-CBN 2)
- March 27: Zyurangers (ABC 5)
- March 28: XYZ: Young Women's TV (PTV 4)
- March 29: Nagmamahal Pa Rin Sa Iyo (ABS-CBN 2)
- March 31: Citynet Noontime/Afternoon News (Citynet 27)
- April 4: Citynet Weekend News (Citynet 27)
- April 9: Mula sa Puso (ABS-CBN 2)
- May 14:
  - Del Tierro (GMA 7)
  - Blue Blink (ABS-CBN 2)
- June 4: Alondra (ABS-CBN 2)
- June 6: Showbiz Lingo Plus (ABS-CBN 2)
- July 23: Chopsuey Espesyal (IBC 13)
- July 30: Esperanza (ABS-CBN 2)
- August 13:
  - The World Tonight (ABS-CBN 2)
  - GMA Network News (GMA 7)
  - Saksi: GMA Headline Balita (GMA 7)
- August 27: Esep-Esep (ABS-CBN 2)
- August 28: Rainbow Cinema (GMA 7)
- September 1: Mikee Forever (GMA 7)
- September 6: Sa Sandaling Kailangan Mo Ako (Book 2) (ABS-CBN 2)
- September 10: Mojacko (GMA 7)
- October 29: Di Ba't Ikaw (GMA 7)
- November 27: T.G.I.S. (GMA 7)
- December 3: Mornings @ GMA (GMA 7)
- December 10: Brunch with Bing & Michelle (GMA 7)
- December 12: PBA on Vintage Sports (IBC 13)
- December 26: Sunday Night Specials (ABC 5)
- December 27: Entertainment Today (ABC 5)

=== Unknown ===
- Cinderella on ABS-CBN 2
- Mobile Suit Gundam Wing on GMA 7
- Lost Universe on ABS-CBN 2
- Isami on ABS-CBN 2
- Kamen Rider Black on IBC 13
- Metalders on IBC 13
- Super Rescue Solbrain on IBC 13
- Pygmalio on ABC 5
- Jiban on GMA 7
- Jetman on RPN 9
- Gameplan on GMA 7
- Magnegosyo on GMA 7
- Midnight Prayer Helps on GMA 7
- Dear Mikee on GMA 7
- TEXT (The Extreme Team) on GMA 7
- Best Frends on GMA 7
- PG (Parents Guide) on GMA 7
- Golympics on GMA 7
- Relaks Lang on PTV 4
- Cyber Jam on SBN 21
- Goin' Bayabas on IBC 13
- Mag Smile Club Na! on IBC 13
- Sine VTV on IBC 13
- Hard Hat on ABC 5
- ABS-CBN & Unilever: Pamilyong Papremyo sa Pamilya on ABS-CBN 2
- MIB: Mga Imbestigador ng Bayan on ABS-CBN 2
- Campus Romance on GMA 7
- Are You Afraid of the Dark? on Studio 23
- The Secret World of Alex Mack on Studio 23
- Saved by the Bell on Studio 23
- Clueless on ABC 5
- Gumby on ABC 5
- He-Man and the Masters of the Universe on ABC 5
- La Viuda de Blanco on ABC 5
- Mobile Suit Gundam Wing on GMA 7
- Rugrats on GMA 7

==== Stopped airing ====
===== Pre-empted for reason stated =====
| Program | Channel | Last airing | Resumed airing | Reason |
|---|---|---|---|---|
| Magandang Tanghali Bayan | ABS-CBN | August 6 | August 28 | Temporary suspension of broadcast for 20 days, which was released by the ruling decision of Movie and Television Review and Classification Board. |

===== Pre-empted due to new millennium celebration =====
| Program | Channel | Last airing | Resumed airing | Reason |
|---|---|---|---|---|
| Chabelita | ABS-CBN | December 30, 1999 | January 3, 2000 | Pre-empted by the ABS-CBN Worldwide Celebration of the New Millennium. |
| Saan Ka Man Naroroon | ABS-CBN | December 30, 1999 | January 3, 2000 | Pre-empted by the ABS-CBN Worldwide Celebration of the New Millennium. |
| Labs Ko Si Babe | ABS-CBN | December 30, 1999 | January 3, 2000 | Pre-empted by the ABS-CBN Worldwide Celebration of the New Millennium. |
| Pulso: Aksyon Balita | ABS-CBN | December 30, 1999 | January 3, 2000 | Pre-empted by the ABS-CBN Worldwide Celebration of the New Millennium. |
| Martin Late at Nite | ABS-CBN | December 30, 1999 | January 3, 2000 | Pre-empted by the ABS-CBN Worldwide Celebration of the New Millennium. |
| Global News | ABS-CBN | December 30, 1999 | January 3, 2000 | Pre-empted by the ABS-CBN Worldwide Celebration of the New Millennium. |
| Star Cinema Presents | ABS-CBN | December 31, 1999 | January 7, 2000 | Pre-empted by the ABS-CBN Worldwide Celebration of the New Millennium. |
| Julie | ABS-CBN | December 31, 1999 | January 7, 2000 | Pre-empted by the ABS-CBN Worldwide Celebration of the New Millennium. |

== Networks ==
=== Launches ===
The following are a list of free-to-air and cable channels or networks launches and closures in 1999.

| Date | Station | Type | Source |
|---|---|---|---|
| July 24 | Lifestyle Network | Cable and satellite | |
| November 6 | Knowledge Channel | Cable and satellite | |

=== Rebranded ===
The following is a list of television stations or cable channels that have made or will make noteworthy network rebrands in 1999.

| Date | Rebranded from | Rebranded to | Type | Source |
|---|---|---|---|---|
| July 24 | I Channel | Lifestyle Network | Cable and Satellite | |
| October 11 | Sarimanok News Network | ABS-CBN News Channel | Cable and Satellite | |
| December 19 | EMC | Channel V Philippines | Broadcasting network | |

=== Closures ===
The following is a list of stations and channels or networks that have stopped broadcasting or (permanently) off the air in 1999.

| Date | Station | Type | Sign-on debut | Source |
|---|---|---|---|---|
| July 23 | I Channel | Cable and Satellite | January 26, 1992 | |

== Births ==
- January 8 – Kelvin Miranda, actor, model and singer
- January 10 – Celine Lim, actress
- January 25 – Ysabel Ortega, actress
- February 8 – Raine Salamante, actress
- March 1 - Zach Guerrero
- March 7 – Karen Arnaldo, actress and model
- March 8 – Jhellen Yamzon, actress, dancer and TV host
- March 10 - Liofer Pinatacan
- March 11 - Jordan Cruz, actor and model
- March 19 – Klea Pineda, actress
- April 1 – Jairus Aquino, actor
- April 5 – Sharlene San Pedro, actress
- April 12 – Janina Vela, actress, model and dancer
- April 19 – Khaycee Aboloc, actress
- April 21 – Loisa Andalio, actress and model
- May 1 – Kisses Delavin, actress
- May 14 – Francis Magundayao, actor
- May 19 – Ashtine Olviga, actress and singer
- June 10 – Felicia Monteloyola, actress, singer and TV host
- September 10 – Hannah Pangilinan
- October 5 – Pauline Mendoza, actress
- October 13 – Yong Muhajil
- October 29 – Kristine Hammond, actress and volleyball player
- October 23 – Joseph Andre Garcia, actor
- November 9 – Kim De Leon, actor
- November 25 – Heaven Peralejo, actress
- November 26 – Gianna Cutler, actress
- December 5 – Julia Buencamino, actress (d. 2015)
- December 15 – Jessie Cruzat, journalist
- December 20 – Migo Adecer, actor and singer

== See also ==
- 1999 in television
