= List of programs broadcast by GMA News TV International =

These are the list of programs broadcast by GMA News TV International.

The programming of GMA News TV International consists mostly of shows from the Philippines from GMA Network, GMA News TV & GMA Regional TV as well as previously aired shows, documentaries, films, and sports events from the Philippines.

== Flagship Newscasts ==
- Balitang Amianan (2013 – present) (North Central Luzon); new episodes & some are replays/ encore telecast (Delivered in Filipino Language) Anchored by: CJ Torida, Joanne Ponsoy, and Harold Reyes.
- Balitang Bisdak (2013 - present) (Central and Eastern Visayas); new episodes & some are replays/ encore telecast (Delivered in Cebuano Language) Anchored by: Alan Domingo, Lou Anne Mae Rondina, and Cecille Quibod Castro.
- One Western Visayas (2018 – present) (Western Visayas); new episodes & some are replays/ encore telecast (Delivered in Hiligaynon Language) Anchored by: Adrian Prietos Together with Co-Anchors are Kaitlene Rivilla and Juan Miguel Dela Cena.
- One Mindanao (2013 – present) (Northern Western South Central and Southern Mindanao); new episodes & some are replays/ encore telecast (Delivered in Cebuano Language) Anchored by: Sarah Hilomen Velasco, Together with Co-Anchors are Jandi Esteban, Rgil Relator, and Cyril Chaves.
- Balitang Southern Tagalog (2022 – present) (Southern Tagalog); new episodes & some are replays/ encore telecast (Delivered in Filipino Language) Anchored by: Ivy Saunar-Gasang and Ace Medrano
- Balitang Bicolandia (2021 – present) (Bicol Region); new episodes & some are replays/ encore telecast (Delivered in Bicolano Language) Anchored by: Jessie Cruzat Together with Co-Anchor Kate Delovieres.
- Regional TV News [Formerly as Regional TV Weekend News] (2021 - present) (National and All Other Countries); new episodes & some are replays/ encore telecast (Delivered in Tagalog Language) Anchored by Various GMA Regional TV Newscast Anchors.

== Morning Programs ==
- Mornings with GMA Regional TV (2020 - present) (North Central Luzon); new episodes and some are replays/ encore telecast (Delivered in Filipino Language)

Hosted by: CJ Torida and Harold Reyes.

- GMA Regional TV Live! (2020 - present) (Central and Eastern Visayas); new episodes and some are replays/ encore telecast (Delivered in Cebuano Language)

Hosted by: Nikko Sereno and Cecille Quibod-Castro.

- GMA Regional TV Early Edition (2020 - present) (Western Visayas); new episodes and some are replays/ encore telecast (Delivered in Hiligaynon Language)

Hosted by: Adrian Prietos, and Kaitline Rivilla.

- At Home with GMA Regional TV (2020 - present) (South Central Western and North Central Mindanao); new episodes and some replays/ encore telecast (Delivered in Cebuano Language)

Hosted by: Jandi Esteban, and Cyril Chaves Together with Abby Caballero of GMA Davao, Efren Mamac of GMA Zamboanga and Jestoni Jumamil of GMA General Santos.

=== Re-aired from GMA Network ===
==== Travelogue ====
- Born Impact: Born to Be Wild Weekend Edition [2013 - 2014 (GMA Network); 2014 - present (GMA News TV International)]; re-runs; some are replays/ encore telecast.

=== Presently Aired from GMA News TV ===
==== News programs ====
- State of the Nation with Jessica Soho [2011–present (GMA News TV), 2011 – present (GMA News TV International)]; new episodes & some are replays/ encore telecast
- Balita Pilipinas Ngayon [2011 – present (GMA News TV), 2011 – present (GMA News TV International)];; new episodes & some are replays/ encore telecast
- News TV Quick Response Team [2011 – present (GMA News TV), 2011 – present (GMA News TV International)];; new episodes & some are replays/ encore telecast
- Dobol B sa News TV [2011–present (GMA News TV), 2017 – present (GMA News TV International)];; new episodes
- News to Go [2011–2019 (GMA News TV), 2011 – present (GMA News TV International)];; new episodes & some are replays/ encore telecast
- Good News Kasama si Vicky Morales [2011 – present (GMA News TV), 2011–present (GMA News TV International)];; new episodes & some are replays/ encore telecast

=== Documentary ===
- Reel Time [2011 – present (GMA News TV); 2011 – present (GMA News TV International)]; new episodes & some are replays/ encore telecast
- i-Witness [1999 – present (GMA Network); 2011 – present (GMA News TV International)]; new episodes & some are replays/ encore telecast
- Tonight with Arnold Clavio [2010 – 2011 (GMA Network); 2011 – present (GMA News TV International)]; new episodes & some are replays/ encore telecast
- iJuander [2011 – present (GMA News TV); 2011 – present (GMA News TV International)]; new episodes & some are replays/ encore telecast
- Brigada [2011 – present (GMA News TV); 2011 – present (GMA News TV International)]; new episodes & some are replays/ encore telecast
- Motorcycle Diaries [2011 – 2017 (GMA News TV); 2017 – present (GMA News TV International)]; new episodes & some are replays/ encore telecast

=== Informative ===
- Agri Preneur [2017 – present (GMA News TV), 2017 – present (GMA News TV International)]; new episodes & some are replays/ encore telecast
- Turbo Zone, Feed Your Drive! [2012 – present (GMA News TV); 2012 – present (GMA News TV International)]; new episodes & some are replays/ encore telecast

=== Lifestyle ===
- Power House [2011 – 2014 (GMA News TV); 2014 – 2016 (GMA Network); 2016 – present (GMA News TV International); new episodes & some are replays/ encore telecast

=== Public Affairs ===
- Bawal ang Pasaway kay Mareng Winnie (2011 – present (GMA News TV); 2011 – present (GMA News TV International); new episodes & some are replays/ encore telecast
- Alisto (2013 – present (GMA Network); 2013 – present (GMA News TV International); new episodes & some are replays/ encore telecast
- Biyaheng DO30 (2016 – present (GMA Network/GMA Regional TV); 2016 – present (GMA News TV International); new episodes & some are replays/ encore telecast
- Investigative Documentaries (2011 – present (GMA News TV); 2011 – present (GMA News TV International); new episodes & some are replays/ encore telecast

=== Sports ===
- National Basketball League (Philippines) (also aired on Basketball TV & Solar Sports in the Philippines); new episodes & some are replays/ encore telecast

=== Re-aired programs from QTV (now GMA News TV) ===
- Tonight with Arnold Clavio (2010 – 2011 (Q); 2011 – present (GMA News TV); 2011 – present (GMA News TV International); new episodes & some are replays/ encore telecast

== See also ==
- GMA News TV
- GMA Life TV
- GMA Pinoy TV
