= DXBG-TV =

Semi-satellite of DXMJ-TV

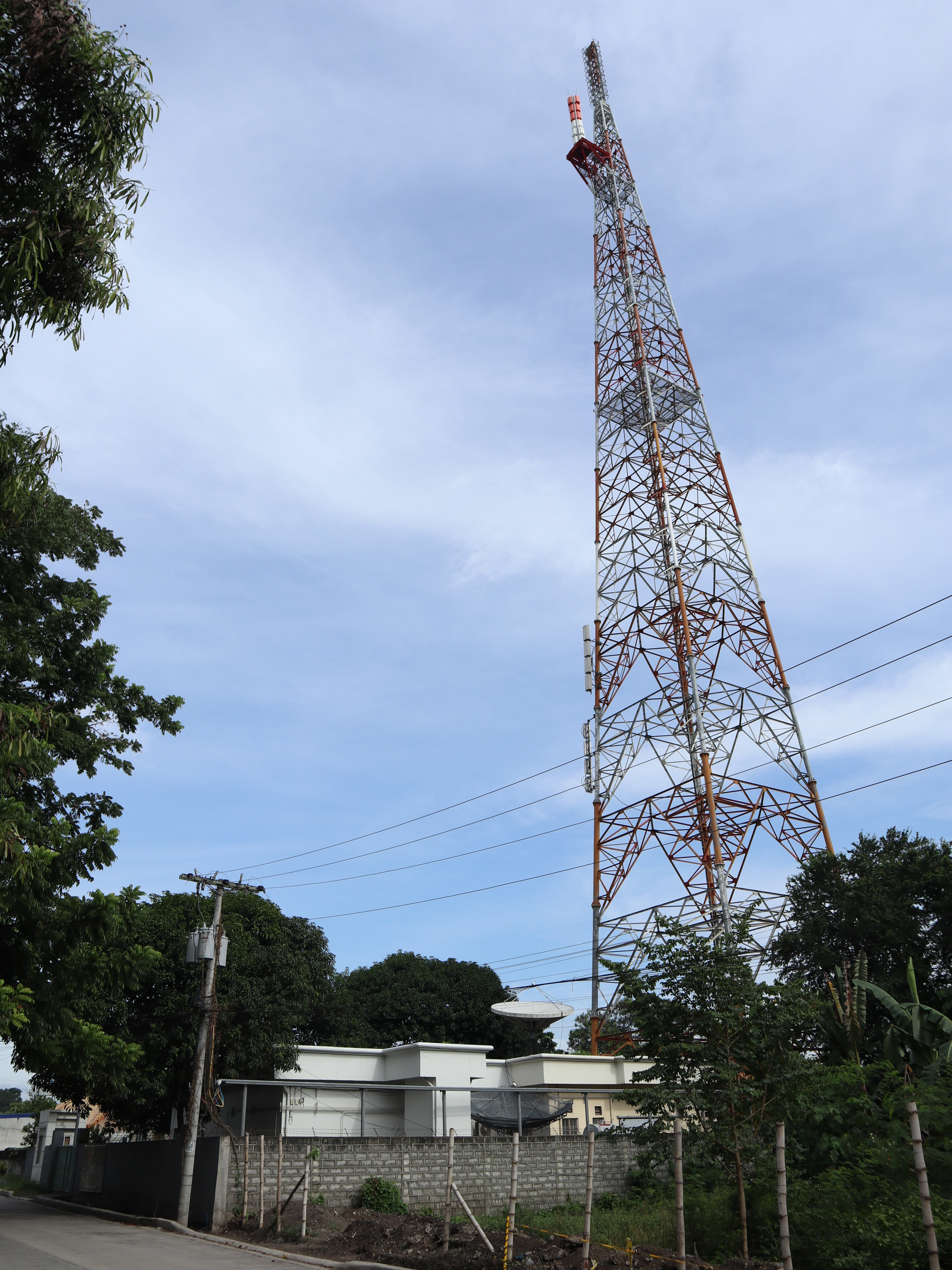
- GMA General Santos' studio and transmitter in 2023
- General Santos; Philippines
- Channels: Analog: 8 (VHF); Digital: 34 (UHF) (ISDB-T) (test broadcast); Virtual: 8.01
- Branding: GMA TV-8 General Santos; GMA South Central Mindanao

Programming
- Subchannels: See list
- Affiliations: 8.1: GMA; 8.2: GTV; 8.3: Heart of Asia; 8.4: I Heart Movies

Ownership
- Owner: GMA Network, Inc.
- Sister stations: DXMP-TV (GTV); Barangay FM 102.3 General Santos

History
- Founded: 1985; 41 years ago
- Former channel number: 4 (1975-1994)
- Former affiliations: GTV/MBS/PTV (1977-1994)

Technical information
- Power: Analog: 10 kW; Digital: 10 kW
- Transmitter coordinates: 6°8′19″N 125°10′45″E

Links
- Website: gmanetwork.com gmaregionaltv.com

DXBG-TV (VHF channel 8) is a local television station in General Santos, Philippines, airing programming from GMA Network. Owned and operated by the network's namesake corporate parent alongside GTV outlet DXMP-TV (channel 26). Both stations share studios and hybrid analog/digital transmitting facility at Nuñez Street, Barangay San Isidro.

== History ==
GMA General Santos began its broadcast on Channel 4 (DXWP-TV) as an affiliate of Southern TV Industries from 1985 to 1998. GMA General Santos transferred its current regional station to Channel 8 as an owned-and-operated station in 1998 and became a relay station delivering programs from Metro Manila via DZBB-TV.

In 2009, GMA General Santos was relaunched as a satellite station with programs being produced, including the public affairs program Soccsksargen Isyu Karon and the news update Flash Bulletin, both launched in 2010. The station began to co-producing and simulcasting the first ever archipelago-wide newscast One Mindanao on August 28, 2017. This led to the station becoming a semi-satellite from GMA Davao.

On December 6, 2021, GMA General Santos commenced digital test broadcasts on UHF Channel 34 covering General Santos and the provinces of South Cotabato, Sarangani and Davao Occidental.

On March 16, 2022, GMA General Santos inaugurated the state-of-the-art facility and studios near the transmitter area.

== GMA TV-8 General Santos current programs ==
- One Mindanao

== GMA TV-8 General Santos defunct programs ==
- Flash Bulletin
- Soccsksargen Isyu Karon
- Isyu Mindanao
- Isyu ug Istorya
- Let's Fiesta
- Visita Iglesia
- Biyaheng DO30
- At Home with GMA Regional TV
- Word of God Network

== Digital television ==
=== Digital channels ===
UHF Channel 34 (593.143 MHz)

Channel	Video	Aspect	Short name	Programming	Note
08.01	480i	4:3	GMA	GMA	Commercial Broadcast (10 kW)
08.02	480i	4:3	GTV	GTV	Commercial Broadcast (10 kW)
08.03	480i	4:3	HEART OF ASIA	Heart of Asia	Commercial Broadcast (10 kW)
08.06	480i	4:3	I HEART MOVIES	I Heart Movies	Commercial Broadcast (10 kW)
08.21	240p	4:3	GMA1SEG	GMA	1seg broadcast

== Areas of coverage ==
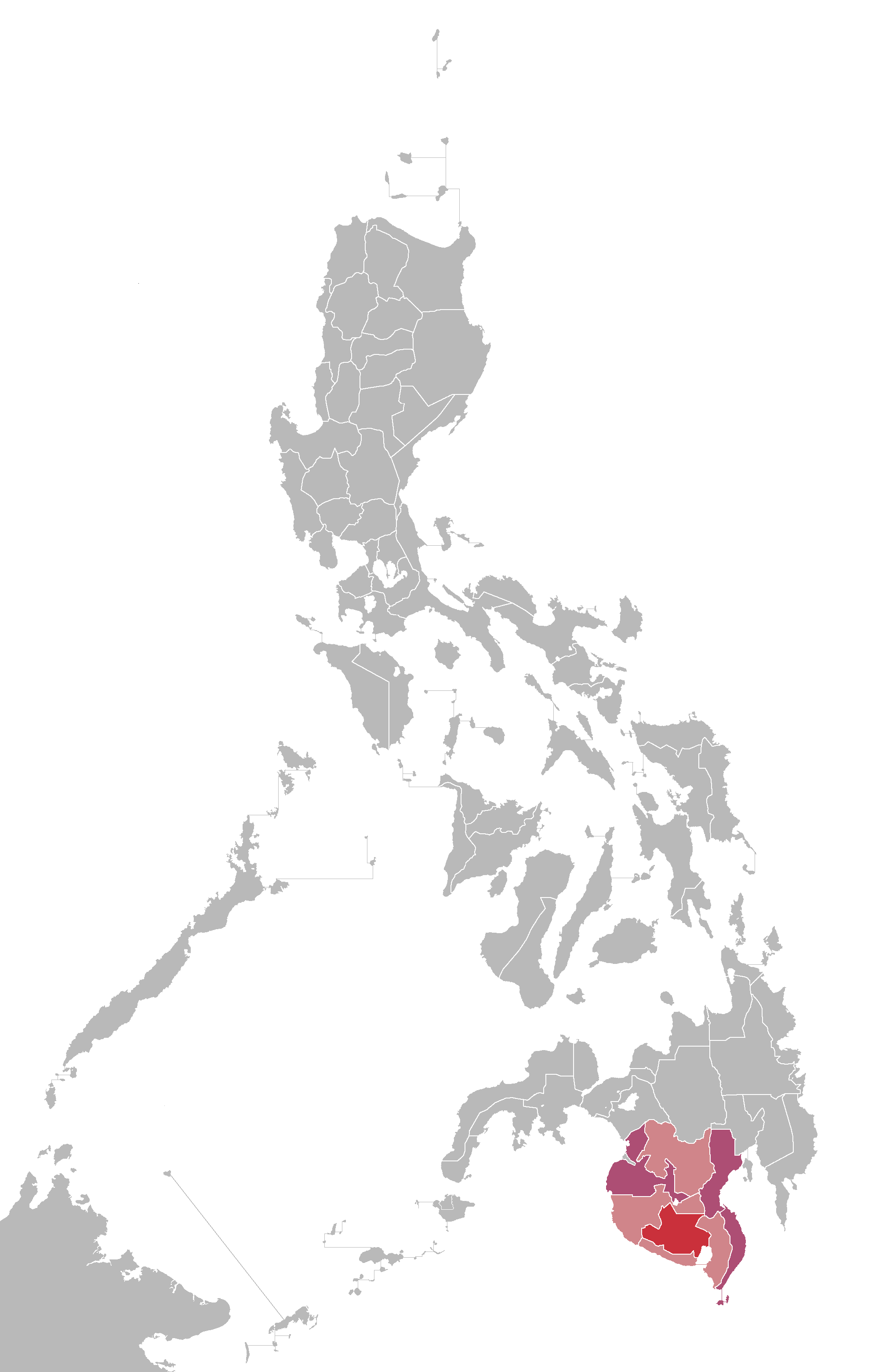
Red: Home location of GMA General Santos Light red and red: Market audience of GMA General Santos (de jure) Violet: Areas that may receive signals from GMA General Santos

- South Cotabato:
  - General Santos
  - Polomolok
- Sarangani:
  - Alabel
  - Glan
  - Malapatan

== See also ==
- Barangay 102.3 General Santos
- List of GMA Network stations
