= DXGM =

DXGM may refer to:

- DXGM-AM, an AM radio station broadcasting in Davao City, branded as Super Radyo
- DXGM-TV, a television station broadcasting in Ozamiz
