= DXVB-TV =

- Zamboanga City; Philippines
- City: Zamboanga City
- Channels: Analog: 21 (UHF); Digital: DXLA-TV 41 (UHF; ISDB-T) (test broadcast); Virtual: 9.02
- Branding: GTV-21 Zamboanga

Programming
- Subchannels: See list
- Affiliations: GTV

Ownership
- Owner: GMA Network Inc.; (Citynet Network Marketing and Productions Inc.)
- Sister stations: DXGP-TV (GMA); DXLA-TV (GMA); GMA Super Radyo DXRC 1287 Zamboanga; Barangay FM 97.1 Zamboanga (defunct)

Technical information
- Licensing authority: NTC
- Power: 10 kilowatts
- ERP: 120 kW ERP

Links
- Website: GTV Website

DXVB-TV (channel 21) is a commercial television station of Philippine television network GTV, owned by Citynet Network Marketing and Productions, a subsidiary of GMA Network Inc. Its transmitter is located at Brgy. Cabatangan, Zamboanga City.

== Digital television ==
=== Digital channels ===
DXVB-TV's feed is broadcast on DXLA-TV digital subchannel operates on UHF channel 41 (635.143 MHz) and broadcasts on the following subchannels:

| Channel | Video | Aspect | Short name | Programming | Note |
|---|---|---|---|---|---|
| 09.01 | 480i | 4:3 | GMA | GMA Zamboanga (Main DXLA-TV programming) | Commercial Broadcast (10 kW) |
| 09.02 | 480i | 4:3 | GTV | GTV Zamboanga (Main DXVB-TV programming) | Commercial Broadcast (10 kW) |
| 09.03 | 480i | 4:3 | HEART OF ASIA | Heart of Asia Channel | Commercial Broadcast (10 kW) |
| 09.04 | 480i | 4:3 | I HEART MOVIES | I Heart Movies | Commercial Broadcast (10 kW) |
| 09.05 | 480i | 4:3 | (UNNAMED) | Test feed | N/A (TEST BROADCAST) |
| 09.06 | 480i | 4:3 | (UNNAMED) | Test feed | N/A (TEST BROADCAST) |
| 09.07 | 480i | 4:3 | (UNNAMED) | Test feed | N/A (TEST BROADCAST) |
| 09.31 | 240p | 4:3 | GMA1SEG | GMA Zamboanga | 1seg broadcast |

== GTV 21 Zamboanga on Cable ==
| Cable/Satellite Provider | Ch. # | Coverage |
|---|---|---|
| Mindanao Cable TV (MCTV) | 12 | Zamboanga City |
| Sky Cable Zamboanga | 14 | Zamboanga City |

== See also ==
- GMA Network
- GTV
- DXLA-TV
- List of GTV stations
