= DXGM-TV =

Television station in Ozamiz, Philippines

GMA TV-5 Ozamiz (DXGM-TV)
Relay of DXMJ-TV
- Philippines
- City: Ozamiz
- Channels: Analog: 5 (VHF)
- Branding: GMA TV-5 Ozamiz

Programming
- Network: GMA Network

Ownership
- Owner: GMA Network Inc.
- Sister stations: DXAT-TV (GTV)

History
- Founded: 1987
- Former channel number: 7 (1987–1995)
- Call sign meaning: GMA

Technical information
- Licensing authority: NTC
- Power: 1 kW
- ERP: 5.35 kW
- Transmitter coordinates: 8°08′14″N 123°49′18″E

Links
- Website: GMANetwork.com

DXGM-TV (channel 5) is a television station in Ozamiz City, Philippines, airing programming from GMA Network and GMA Davao. Owned and operated by the network's namesake corporate parent, the station maintains a hybrid analog transmitting facility at Bukagan Hill in Barangay Malaubang.

In 1987, GMA Ozamiz began broadcasting as an affiliate by Misamis Institute of Technology, Inc. (MIT-RTVN) until 1995 when the station was then affiliated for ABS-CBN (along with DXLM Channel 9 Pagadian also owned by MIT-RTVN). It transferred to Channel 5 when the network later picked up its frequency.

== GMA TV-5 Ozamiz current programs ==
- One Mindanao

== GMA TV-5 Ozamiz former programs ==
- 24 Oras Northern Mindanao
- At Home with GMA Regional TV
- Testigo Northern Mindanao

== Areas of coverage ==
- Ozamiz City and surrounding areas

== See also ==
- DXDZ-DTV
- DXMJ-TV
- List of GMA Network stations
