= DXEJ-TV =

GMA TV-3 Pagadian (DXEJ-TV)
- Philippines
- City: Pagadian City
- Channels: Analog: 3 (VHF)

Programming
- Affiliations: GMA Network

Ownership
- Owner: GMA Network Inc.
- Sister stations: DXAU-TV (GTV)

History
- First air date: 1995

Technical information
- Licensing authority: NTC
- Power: 5 kW
- ERP: 10 kW

Links
- Website: GMANetwork.com

DXEJ-TV (channel 3) is a television station in Pagadian City, Philippines, airing programming from GMA Manila and GMA Davao. Owned and operated by the network's namesake corporate parent, the station maintains transmitter facilities atop Mount Palpalan, Pagadian.

== GMA TV-3 Pagadian current programs ==
- One Mindanao

== GMA TV-3 Pagadian former programs ==
- At Home with GMA Regional TV

== See also ==
- List of GMA Network stations
