= DXLA-TV =

Television station in Zamboanga City, Philippines

GMA TV-9 Zamboanga (DXLA-TV)
- Philippines
- City: Zamboanga City
- Channels: Analog: 9 (VHF); Digital: 41 (UHF) (ISDB-T) (test broadcast); Virtual: 9.01
- Branding: GMA TV-9 Zamboanga; GMA Western Mindanao

Programming
- Subchannels: See list

Ownership
- Owner: GMA Network Inc.
- Sister stations: DXVB-TV (GTV); GMA Super Radyo DXRC 1287 Zamboanga

History
- Founded: May 17, 1978; 48 years ago
- Former channel number: Analog: 7 (1961-1976), 3 (1976-1995)
- Former affiliations: BBC/City2 (1978-1986); ABS-CBN (1986-1995)
- Call sign meaning: Clara Lobregat and Basilio Apolinario, founders of former owners First United Broadcasting Corporation

Technical information
- Licensing authority: NTC
- Power: Analog: 5 kW; Digital: 10 kW
- Transmitter coordinates: 6°56′59″N 122°3′23″E
- Repeater: DXLS-TV (GMA TV-12 Jolo)

Links
- Website: GMANetwork.com

DXLA-TV (VHF channel 9) is a commercial television station owned and operated by GMA Network, Inc. Its transmitter is located at Barangay Cabatangan, Zamboanga City.

== History ==
Channel 9 Zamboanga, launched as a 1 kW relay station in May 17, 1978 by First United Broadcasting Corporation (now Global Satellite Technology Services), began as DXLA 9Alive. Initially affiliated with BBC/City2 (1974–1986), it became an ABS-CBN affiliate for the Zamboanga Peninsula after BBC was shut down due to government sequestration.

Weekday broadcasts ran from 12:00 p.m. to 11:00 p.m., and weekends from 9:00 a.m. to midnight. Local shows included Cuentas Claras and FUBC News, with national newscasts like TV Patrol and The World Tonight also airing.

From 1988 to 1995, TV-9 adopted a version of the Star Network ID package alongside the launch of satellite transmissions to the Sulu Archipelago and Zamboanga Peninsula, offering a blend of local and national content. The station's logo featured a white star holding the number 9, later updated to red, green, and blue in 1995.

On January 1, 1995, after signing off for New Year's Day, ABS-CBN acquired rival station DXLL-TV Channel 3 from RT Broadcasting. As part of the deal, networks were swapped: ABS-CBN became an owned-and-operated station using Channel 3, while FUBC Channel 9 was acquired and also became owned-and-operated by GMA. Since then, GMA Zamboanga has operated as a relay station of flagship DZBB-TV Channel 7 in Metro Manila, with limited local advertising.

On August 28, 2017, GMA Zamboanga was integrated into the network's Mindanao super region and began simulcasting One Mindanao, the first Mindanao-wide newscast from GMA Davao (Channel 5), catering to both Cebuano and Chavacano-speaking viewers in Zamboanga City.

On October 14, 2021, GMA Regional TV announced the launch of GMA Network's fourth regional office in Mindanao and tenth nationwide. One Mindanao reports from the Zamboanga Peninsula and the Sulu Archipelago are beamed to Davao City transmitters via the station's newsroom and gathering facilities. The station was later closed in 2024.

Since October 12, 2022, GMA Zamboanga began digital test broadcasts on UHF Channel 41.

== GMA TV-9 Zamboanga current programs ==
- One Mindanao

== GMA TV-9 Zamboanga former programs ==
- At Home with GMA Regional TV
- Byaheng DO30

== Digital television ==
=== Digital channels ===
UHF Channel 41 (635.143 MHz)

Channel	Video	Aspect	Short name	Programming	Note
09.01	480i	4:3	GMA	GMA Zamboanga (Main DXLA-TV programming)	Commercial broadcast (10 kW)
09.02	480i	4:3	GTV	GTV	Commercial broadcast (10 kW)
09.03	480i	4:3	HEART OF ASIA	Heart of Asia Channel	Commercial broadcast (10 kW)
09.06	480i	4:3	I HEART MOVIES	I Heart Movies	Commercial broadcast (10 kW)
09.21	240p	4:3	GMA1SEG	GMA Zamboanga Relay	1seg broadcast

== Rebroadcasters ==
Callsign	Transmitter location	Channel	TPO	Coordinates
DXLS	Jolo, Sulu	12 (analog, VHF)	1 kW (analog)	6°2′59″N 120°59′58″E

== See also ==
- List of GMA Network stations
- Global Satellite Technology Services
