= DXMJ =

DXMJ may refer to one of the following GMA Network-owned broadcasters in Mindanao, Philippines:

- DXMJ-FM, a defunct radio station (97.1 FM) in Zamboanga City
- DXMJ-TV, a television station (channel 5) in Davao City, broadcasting as GMA TV-5 Davao
