= Kuyaw! =

- Genre: Variety
- Presented by: Bea dela Fuente; Nikko Ferrer; Kristine Gonzales; Kristal Gonzales
- Country of origin: Philippines
- Original language: Cebuano

Production
- Camera setup: Multiple-camera setup
- Running time: 60 minutes
- Production company: GMA Entertainment Group

Original release
- Network: GMA Davao
- Release: October 2005 – January 2008

Kuyaw! (lit. 'Great!'), is a Philippine television variety show broadcast by GMA Davao. Hosted by Kristine Gonzales, Kristal Gonzales, Bea dela Fuente and Niko Ferrer, it premiered in October 2005. The show concluded in January 2008.

"Kuyaw" reaches areas like Agusan del Sur (Trento), Davao de Oro (Nabunturan, Mabini, Pantukan, Maco, Mawab), Davao del Norte (Kapalong, Asunsion, Tagum), whole of Davao City, Island Garden City of Samal (Babak, Penaplate, Kaputian), and Davao del Sur (Digos, Bansalan, Sulop, Hagonoy, Sta. Cruz).

== Hosts ==
K1 and K2 are former Sexbomb Davao Dancers of Eat Bulaga! who can be considered as deadringers for actress Rica Peralejo. Born in 1987 and taking up Masscomm at Holy Cross of Davao, they started their TV career as hosts of the defunct GMA Davao variety show “Singgit Davao” . The boy next door Dan Lester a.k.a. Niko Ferrer was born in 1989, a former image model of NCCC Mall, photo studio model and is into hip-hop dancing. He’s a nursing student at Brokenshire College. Bea Dela Fuente is one of the top 16 contenders of the third season of Starstruck, representing Davao along with Chuck Allie.

== Segments ==
Among the segments in Kuyaw are:

Made in UK - This addresses problems of letter-senders about fashion, beauty, health, wellness, etc.

Kuyaw Exposed - The segment features the accomplishments and achievements of Kapusong Dabawenyo in their field of endeavors. Hosted by Niko Ferrer, the interviewee gives a glimpse of his world and teaches Niko special skills during role-playing.

Artist Avenue - A segment featuring local artists in an interview with Music video (MTV) style.

Sikarahay - A segment that showcases the recipe of the best cook in the barangay.

== Past segments ==
Pop Sensation Showdown - A singing contest that serves as a venue for amateur singers from the various barangays and nearby provinces to showcase their talent on TV. The segment is also seen on "Kuyaw"'s sister show "Bongga!" GMA Network's regional variety show in Western Visayas (Channel 6 Iloilo).

Kuyaw Ka Ba! (KKB) - A version of the reality-TV show, Extra Challenge. Two pairs of teenagers (called Teen Idols in KKB) compete in several challenges that test their stamina, wit and skills.

Ay Kalingaw - A parlor game specifically boxing among third sex. This is similar to the segment "Pok Gi Pok" of "Bongga!"
