= DXCJ =

Radio station in General Santos, Philippines

Barangay FM General Santos (DXCJ)
- General Santos; Philippines
- Broadcast area: South Cotabato, Sarangani and surrounding areas
- Frequency: 102.3 MHz
- Branding: Barangay FM 102.3; Barangay FM 102.3 Super Radyo (for news operations)

Programming
- Languages: Cebuano, Filipino
- Format: Contemporary MOR, News, Talk
- Network: Barangay LS; Super Radyo

Ownership
- Owner: GMA Network Inc.
- Sister stations: GMA TV-8 General Santos; GTV 26 General Santos

History
- First air date: May 18, 1996
- Former names: Campus Radio (May 18, 1996-February 16, 2014)
- Call sign meaning: Campus Jam

Technical information
- Licensing authority: NTC
- Power: 10,000 watts
- ERP: 15,000 watts

Links
- Website: Official Facebook Page

DXCJ (102.3 FM), broadcasting as Barangay FM 102.3 (or Barangay FM 102.3 Super Radyo), is a radio station owned and operated by GMA Network subsidiary Radio GMA. The station's studio and transmitter are located at the 3rd floor of PBC Building, Cagampang St., General Santos.

== History ==
=== 1996-2014: Campus Radio ===
The station, along with the now-defunct DXBB-AM, was established On May 18, 1996, as Campus Radio. It bared its first slogan "Always and Forever". In 2001, it adapted the slogan "Kuyawa Ui!" (Bisaya term for shocking). In 2003, due to of the series of bombings in the city that year, it changed its slogan to "Wow! Nindutah Ah!", which is also used in Davao City-based Campus Radio until today. In 2010, it adapted the slogan "The Best!", which was used by its flagship station back in the 80s. In 2012, it changed its slogan to "Ayos!".

=== 2014-present: Barangay FM ===
Barangay FM 102.3 logo from 2021 to 2023

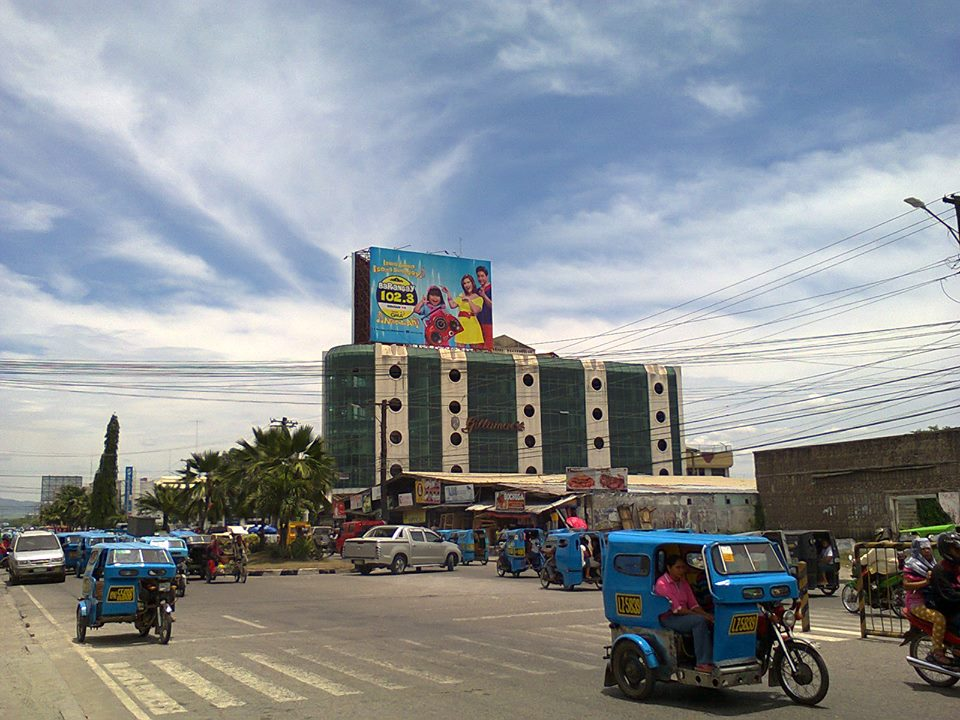
A Billboard of Barangay 102.3 Gensan in General Santos

On February 17, 2014, Campus Radio was relaunched as Barangay 102.3 as part of RGMA's brand unification.

In 2021, Barangay FM added news and talk to its programming under the Super Radyo branding, similar to Kalibo-based Barangay RU.

== Incidents ==
On December 21, 2014, a hostage-taking occurred when a man named Gabby Batican went into the station to call for assistance after being threatened with death. After growing suspicious about Batican, who is the cousin of one of the station's DJs (DJ Angel), the radio station staff alerted the police. Batican may have been under the influence of narcotics when he took the victims hostage, and the hostage drama lasted for more than an hour.
