= DXMJ-TV =

GMA TV-5 Davao (DXMJ-TV)
- Davao City; Philippines
- Channels: Analog: 5 (VHF); Digital: 37 (UHF) (ISDB-T); Virtual: 5
- Branding: GMA TV-5 Davao

Programming
- Subchannels: See list
- Affiliations: 5.1: GMA; 5.2: GTV; 5.3: Heart of Asia; 5.6: I Heart Movies

Ownership
- Owner: GMA Network Inc.
- Sister stations: DXRA-TV (GTV); GMA Super Radyo DXGM 1125 Davao; Barangay LS 103.5 Davao

History
- Founded: December 25, 1962; 63 years ago
- Former call signs: DXMT-TV (1962-1972); GMA Network: DXSS-TV (1975-1994)
- Former channel numbers: GMA Network: 7 (1975-1994)
- Former affiliations: Associated Broadcasting Corporation (1962-1972)
- Call sign meaning: Menardo Jimenez

Technical information
- Licensing authority: NTC
- Power: Analog: 25 kW; Digital: 15 kW
- ERP: Analog: 360 kW; Digital: 72 kW
- Transmitter coordinates: 07°04′25″N 125°34′34″E

Links
- Website: GMANetwork.com

DXMJ-TV (channel 5) is a television station in Davao City, Philippines, serving as the Mindanao flagship of the GMA network. It is owned and operated by the network's namesake corporate parent alongside GTV outlet DXRA-TV (channel 27). Its studios and transmitter with its 250 ft. tower at the GMA Davao Complex, Broadcast Avenue, Shrine Hills in Matina.

== History ==
- December 25, 1962 – DXMT-TV Channel 5 was launched by Associated Broadcasting Corporation (now TV5 Network Inc.) until President of the Philippines Ferdinand Marcos declared Martial Law.
- October 1, 1998 – GMA Network acquired the Channel 5 frequency from ABC and its callsign was changed to DXMJ-TV. As part of its acquisition, GMA's transmitter site transferred from its original location in Tagum City, Davao del Norte to Shrine Hills in Davao City. Following these changes, Channel 5 was relaunched as a GMA Network station and became a relay station delivering programs from Metro Manila via DZBB-TV.
- October 4, 1999 – DXMJ-TV was upgraded into an originating station with the producing of its regional newscasts Testigo (initially known as Testigo: GMA Super Balita), a localized version of the network’s longest-running newscast Saksi, focusing on news coverage for the Davao City area. This was soon followed by the launch of the musical variety show Singgit Davao on October 24 of the same year. Shortly thereafter, GMA’s television operations in Davao relocated to the Amesco Building along Magsaysay Street, which had been the home of GMA’s radio stations since its inauguration in 1996.
- May 5, 2008 – GMA Davao relocated its television studios to its transmitter site in Shrine Hills, Matina, moving from its original studio at the Amesco Building. The Amesco Building continued to serve as the headquarters for GMA Davao's radio operations until it eventually moved to Shrine Hills in January 2010.
- June 27, 2018 – GMA Davao commenced ISDB-T digital test broadcasts on UHF Channel 37 (611.143 MHz) through Metro Davao, spent PHP 32.98 million. It later expanded across parts of the Davao Region, spending PHP 7.56 million for the station upgrade to 15 kilowatts within March 15, 2020.

== GMA TV-5 Davao current programs ==
- One Mindanao
- Word of God Network
- Kadayawan Festival (annually, every 3rd Sunday of August)

== GMA TV-5 Davao previously aired programs ==
- 24 Oras Davao
- 24 Oras Southern Mindanao
- Ang Mahiwagang Baul
- At Home with GMA Regional TV
- Biyaheng DO30
- Business Today
- Istayl Nato
- Isyu Karon Southern Mindanao / Isyu Mindanao
- Isyu ug Istorya
- Ka Ina
- Kakabakaboo
- Kape at Balita
- Kapuso Sine Spesyal
- Kuyaw!
- Let's Fiesta
- Mga Kuwento ni Lola Basyang
- Saturday Box Office Hits
- Siete Palabras Live at the San Pedro Cathedral (Good Friday)
- Singgit Davao
- Testigo
- The Mindanao Agenda (special program for 2010 elections)
- Una Ka BAI
- Visita Iglesia

== Digital television ==
=== Digital channels ===
DXMJ-TV's digital signal operates on UHF channel 37 (611.143 MHz) and broadcasts on the following subchannels:

Channel	Video	Aspect	Short name	Programming	Note
05.01	480i	4:3	GMA	GMA Davao (Main DXMJ-TV programming)	Commercial broadcast (5 kW)
05.02	480i	4:3	GTV	GTV	Commercial broadcast (5 kW)
05.03	480i	4:3	HEART OF ASIA	Heart of Asia	Commercial broadcast (5 kW)
05.06	480i	4:3	I HEART MOVIES	I Heart Movies	Commercial broadcast (5 kW)
05.21	240p	4:3	GMA 1Seg	GMA Davao Relay	1seg broadcast

== Areas of coverage ==
=== Primary Areas ===
- Davao del Sur (including Davao City and Digos City)
- Davao del Norte (including Tagum City)

=== Secondary Areas ===
- Davao de Oro
- Davao Oriental (including Mati City)
- Portion of Davao Occidental

== Rebroadcasters ==
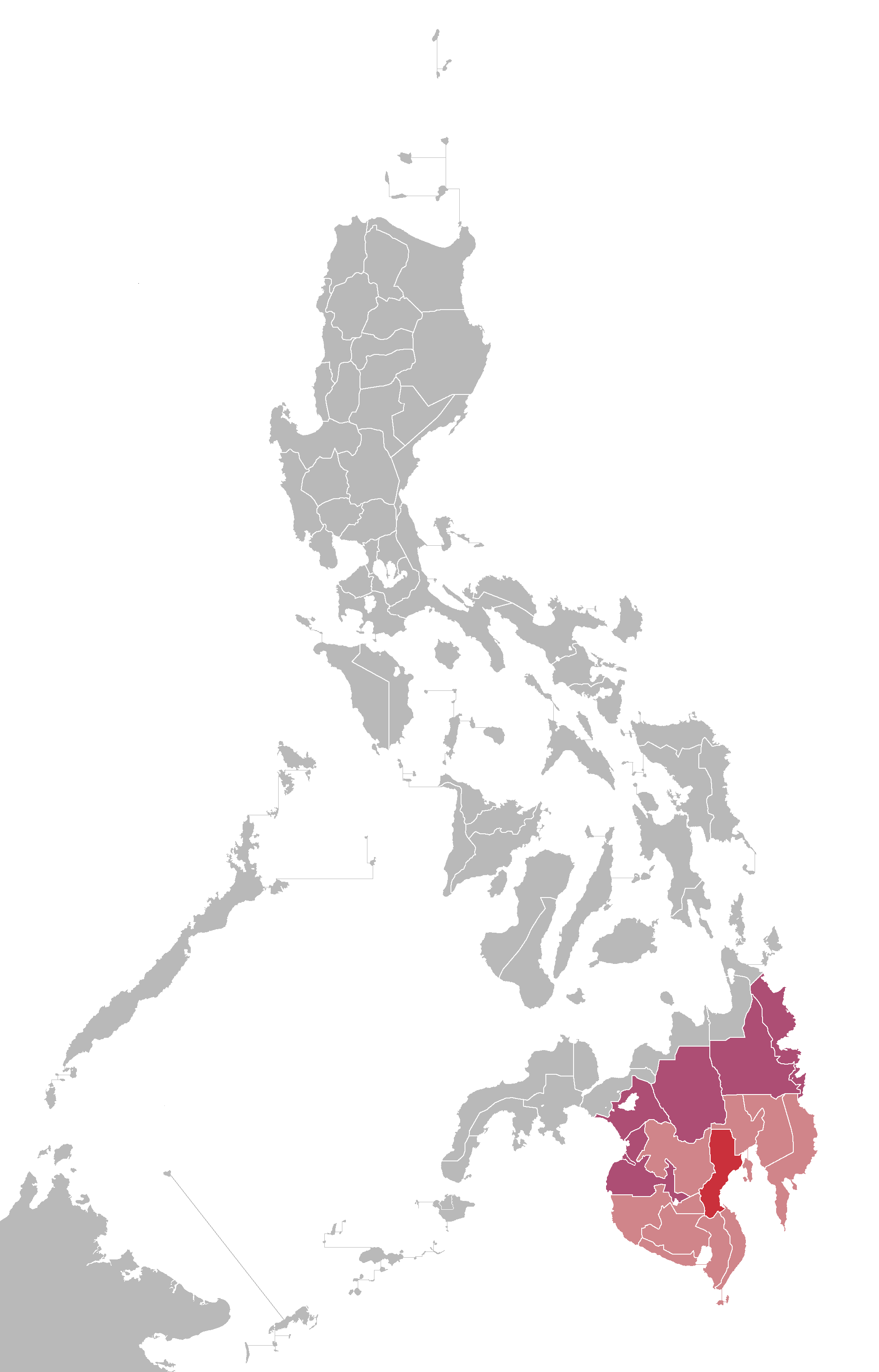
Red: Home location of GMA Davao Light red and red: Market audience of GMA Davao Violet: Areas that may receive signals from GMA Davao

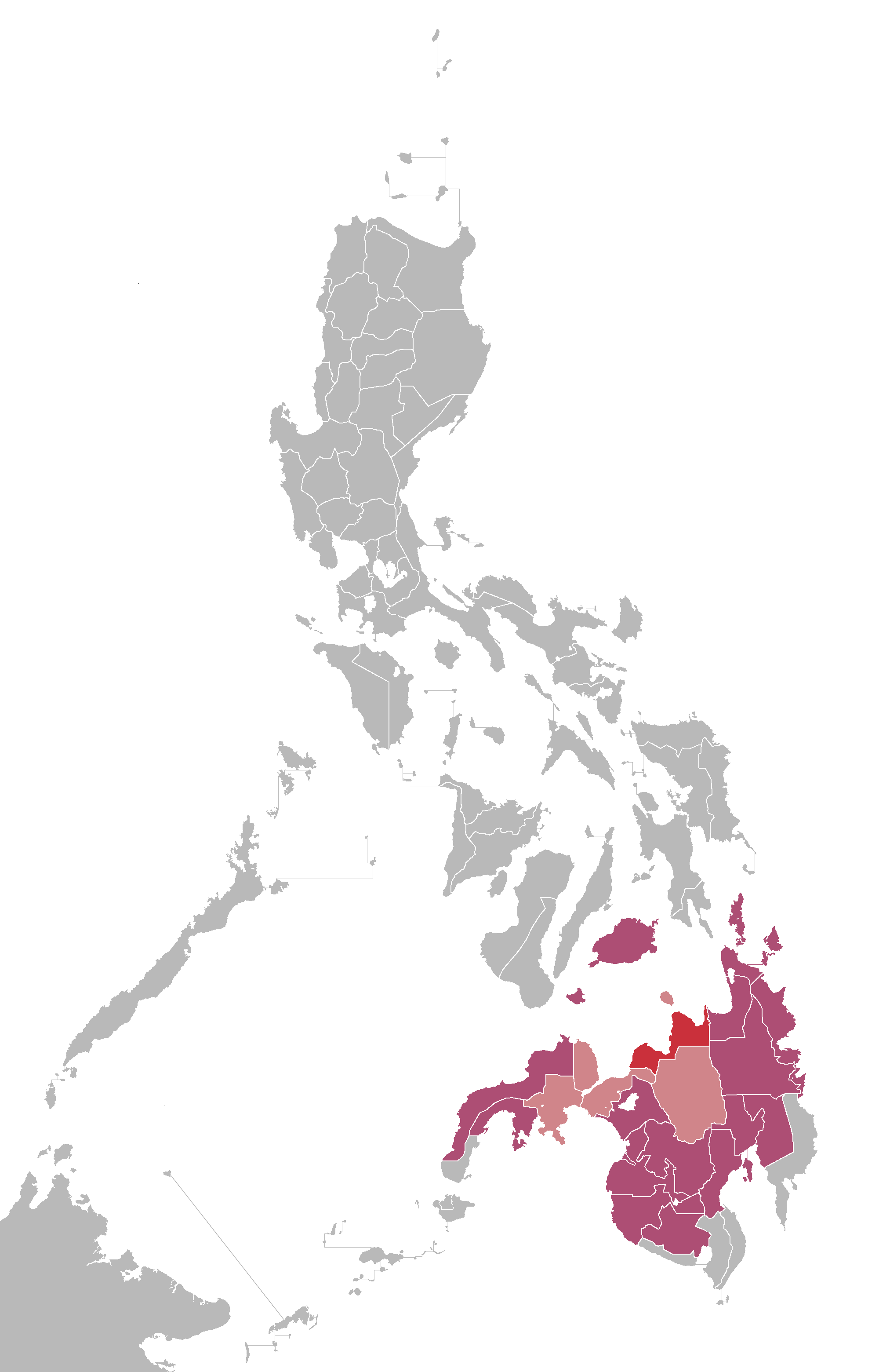
Red: Home location of GMA Northern Mindanao Light red and red: Market audience of GMA Northern Mindanao Violet: Areas that may receive signals from GMA Northern Mindanao

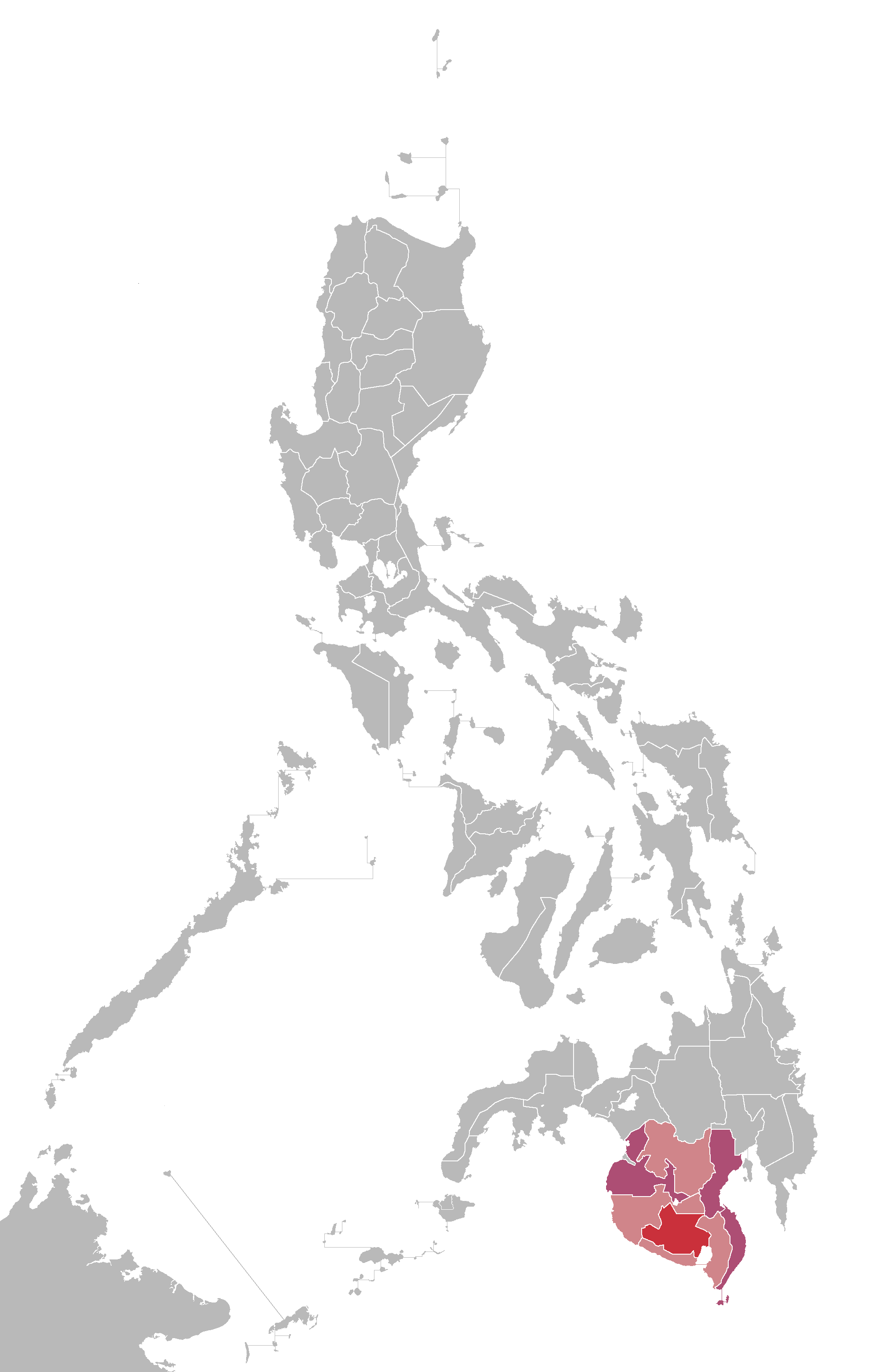
Red: Home location of GMA General Santos Light red and red: Market audience of GMA General Santos (de jure) Violet: Areas that may receive signals from GMA General Santos

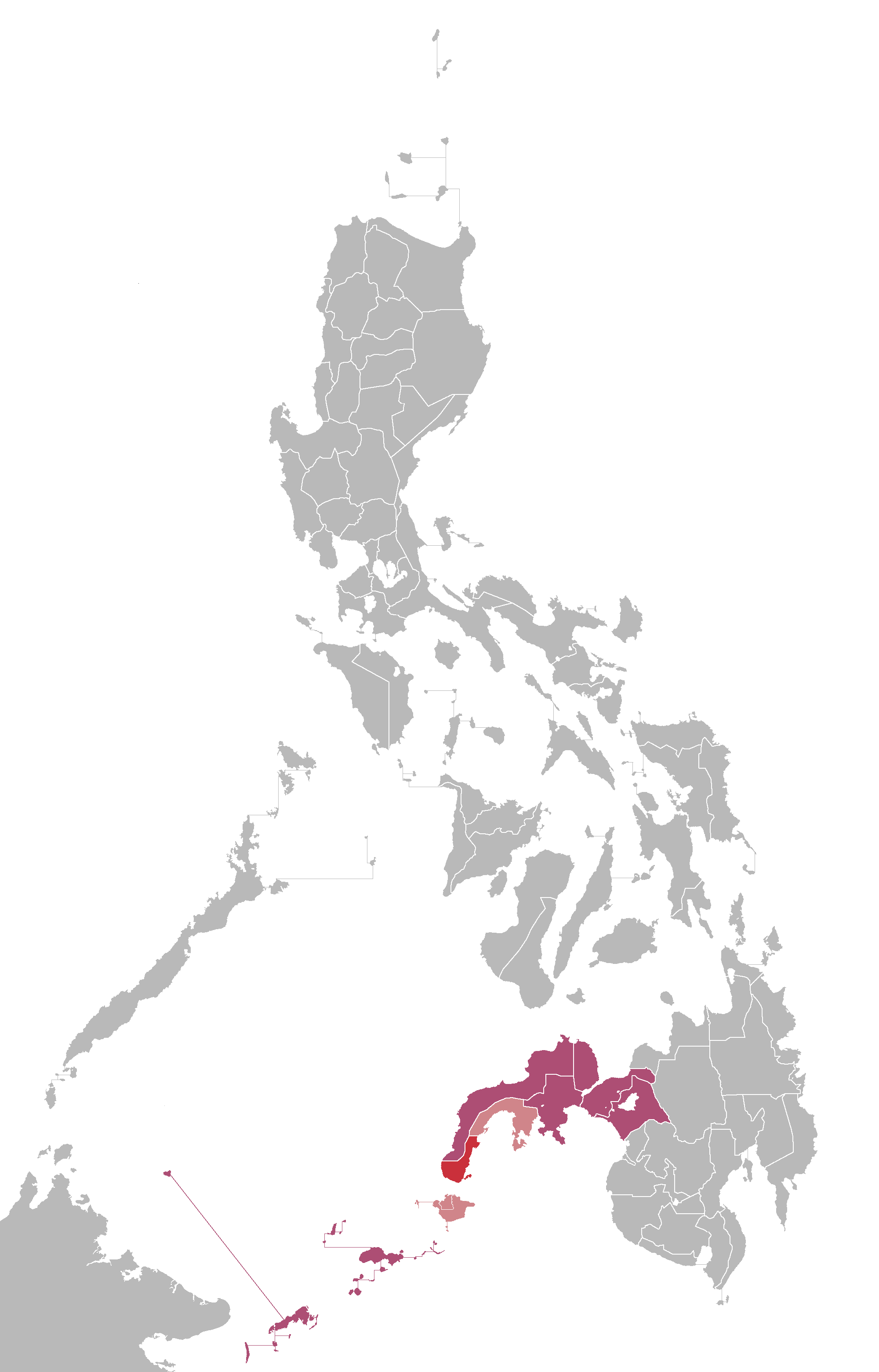
Red: Home location of GMA Zamboanga Light red and red: Market audience of GMA Zamboanga Violet: Areas that may receive signals from GMA Zamboanga

Since 2017, GMA Davao’s programming has been broadcast across more than fourteen relay and rebroadcasting stations throughout Mindanao, significantly extending its regional reach.

Prior to becoming a Davao-based satellite hub, the General Santos station operated as an originating station from 2010 to 2015. During that period, it produced localized programs such as SOCCSKSARGEN Isyu Karon and Flash Bulletin. However, following the centralization of regional operations, it was absorbed by GMA Davao. This resulted in the simulcast of One Mindanao and other regional interstitial segments. Many of the editorial and reportorial staff from General Santos were also integrated into GMA Davao's operations, especially as GMA General Santos was not re-upgraded to full originating status.

Similarly, GMA Cagayan de Oro operated as an originating station from 2010 to 2015, producing regional programs like Northern Mindanao Isyu Karon and Testigo Northern Mindanao (later rebranded as 24 Oras Northern Mindanao). These two were discontinued following the retrenchment, with GMA Cagayan de Oro being absorbed into GMA Davao’s network. Its programming was replaced with simulcasts of One Mindanao and related regional content, while a number of its staff were retained under GMA Davao.

Other stations, including those in Zamboanga City, Jolo, Sulu; Butuan, Cotabato City, Surigao City, and Tandag previously functioned as direct satellite relays of GMA-7 Manila. As of August 28, 2017, they were reassigned as relay stations under GMA Davao, further consolidating Mindanao operations.

The Zamboanga station was later upgraded to a semi-satellite station for Western Mindanao on October 14, 2021 (later closed in 2024), and the General Santos station followed as a semi-satellite station for South Central Mindanao on March 21, 2022.

During Typhoon Rai (Odette), its relay station in Surigao City was severely damaged and temporarily replaced with a small antenna within the transmission building.

Rebroadcasters
Callsign	Location	TV	TPO
DXJC	Cagayan de Oro	35 (analog, UHF)	20 kW (analog)
DXDZ	Cagayan de Oro	47 (digital, UHF)	10 kW (digital)
DXBG	General Santos	8 (analog, VHF); 34 (digital, UHF)	10 kW (analog/digital)
DXEJ	Pagadian	3 (analog VHF)	1 kW (10 kW ERP)
DXLA	Zamboanga City	9 (analog, VHF); 41 (digital, UHF)	5 kW (analog); 10 kW (digital)
DXLS	Jolo, Sulu	12 (analog, VHF)	0.1 kW (10.25 kW ERP)
D-4-XT	Dipolog	4 (analog, VHF); 15 (digital, UHF)	1 kW (analog/digital)
DXGM	Ozamiz	5 (analog, VHF)	1 kW
DXRV	Iligan	11 (analog, VHF); 33 (digital, UHF)	2 kW (analog); 5 kW (digital)
DXMK	Mt. Kitanglad, Bukidnon	12 (analog, VHF); 44 (digital, UHF)	5 kW (analog); 10 kW (digital)
DXNS	Cotabato City	12 (analog, VHF)	1 kW
DXRC	Tandag	2 (analog, VHF)	1 kW (15 kW ERP)
DXBM	Butuan	26 (analog, UHF); 15 (digital, UHF)	5 kW (analog); 10 kW (digital)
D-10-XA	Surigao City	10 (analog, VHF)	1 kW (10.25 kW ERP)

== See also ==
- DXGM-AM
- List of GMA Network stations
