= DXBB =

DXBB may refer to:

- DXBB-AM, a defunct AM radio station in General Santos
- DXBB-FM, an FM radio station broadcasting in Butuan, branded as Wild FM
