= DXAV-TV =

- Dipolog; Philippines
- City: Dipolog
- Channels: Analog: 26 (UHF); Digital: D-4-XT-TV 15 (UHF; ISDB-T) Virtual: 4.02
- Branding: GTV-26 Dipolog

Programming
- Affiliations: GTV

Ownership
- Owner: GMA Network Inc.; (Citynet Network Marketing and Productions Inc.)
- Sister stations: D-4-XT-TV (GMA)

History
- First air date: 1995
- Former affiliations: Citynet Television (1995-1999); Entertainment Music Channel (1999); Channel V Philippines (1999-2001); Silent (2001-2005); QTV/Q (2005-2011); GMA News TV (2011-2021)

Technical information
- Licensing authority: NTC
- Power: 15 kilowatts
- ERP: 120 kilowatt ERP

Links
- Website: GTV

DXAV-TV, is a commercial television station of Philippine television network GTV, owned by Citynet Network Marketing and Productions, a subsidiary of GMA Network Inc. Its transmitter facility are located at Linabo Peak, Lugdungan, Dipolog.

== See also ==
- GTV
- List of GTV stations
