= DXMJ-FM =

DXMJ
- Zamboanga City; Philippines
- Broadcast area: Zamboanga City, Basilan and surrounding areas
- Frequency: 97.1 MHz

Programming
- Format: Silent

Ownership
- Owner: GMA Network Inc.
- Sister stations: GMA TV-9 Zamboanga; GTV 21 Zamboanga; Super Radyo DXRC 1287

History
- First air date: April 13, 1996
- Last air date: March 31, 2010
- Former names: Campus Radio
- Call sign meaning: Menardo Jimenez

Technical information
- Licensing authority: NTC

DXMJ (97.1 FM) was a radio station owned and operated by GMA Network subsidiary Radio GMA. It was formerly known as Campus Radio from its inception in 1996 to 2010, when it went off the air due to lack of advertisers' support and financial problems.
