= One Mindanao =

Philippine television news show

- Title card since 2026
- Also known as: Testigo; 24 Oras Southern Mindanao; 24 Oras Davao
- Genre: News broadcasting
- Directed by: Kim Eugene V. Palma
- Presented by: Sarah Hilomen-Velasco (Davao); Cyril Chaves (Cagayan de Oro); James Paolo Yap (Cagayan De Oro)
- Narrated by: Sarah Hilomen-Velasco; Al Torres (1999-2024); Weng dela Peña (since 2025)
- Country of origin: Philippines
- Original languages: Cebuano; Hiligaynon (interviewees in Soccsksargen areas); Tagalog (interviewees in Metro Davao, Soccsksargen and Bangsamoro areas, including Cotabato City)

Production
- Executive producers: Earl John Balungay; Darios Relatado
- Production locations: GMA Davao Complex, Shrine Hills, Matina, Davao City; GMA Cagayan de Oro Studios, Brgy. 31, Cagayan de Oro; GMA General Santos Studios, San Isidro, General Santos; GMA Zamboanga Studios, Putik, Zamboanga City (2022–24)
- Camera setup: Multiple-camera setup
- Running time: 30 minutes
- Production companies: GMA Regional TV; GMA News

Original release
- Network: GMA 5 Davao; GMA 35 Cagayan de Oro; GMA 8 General Santos; GMA 9 Zamboanga
- Release: October 4, 1999 – present

One Mindanao (also known as GMA Regional TV One Mindanao; formerly known as Testigo, 24 Oras Southern Mindanao and 24 Oras Davao) is the regional newscast of GMA Network's Mindanao stations in Davao, Cagayan de Oro, General Santos, and Zamboanga (2022-2024). Originally anchored by Tek Ocampo, it premiered on October 4, 1999. Sarah Hilomen-Velasco, Cyril Chaves, and James Paolo Yap currently serve as anchors.

== Overview ==
The newscast covers the most significant news and features six regions in Mindanao; Davao Region, Northern Mindanao, Caraga, Soccsksargen, Bangsamoro Autonomous Region in Muslim Mindanao and Zamboanga Peninsula (including Zamboanga City), through the network's news teams from Southern Mindanao and news stringers across the island group.

The newscast airs from Monday to Friday from 5:10 PM to 5:40 PM on GMA Davao (Channel 5), GMA Cagayan De Oro (Channel 35), GMA General Santos (Channel 8) and GMA Zamboanga (Channel 9) with a simulcast over TV-4 Dipolog, TV-3 Pagadian, TV-11 Iligan, TV-12 Bukidnon, TV-5 Ozamiz, TV-26 Butuan, TV-10 Surigao, TV-2 Tandag, TV-12 Cotabato, and TV-12 Jolo; and is also replayed on DXGM-AM 1125 kHz Super Radyo Davao at 6:00 pm.

One Mindanao was also re-aired for national viewers under GTV’s late-night block "Regional TV Strip" every week. It aired every Thursday at 11:50 PM from May 21, 2020, to July 22, 2021.

The program also airs worldwide on GMA News TV.

== History ==
=== 1979-1993: As News at 7 Davao ===
The first GMA Davao newscast, named News at 7 Davao brought the first newscast in Southern Mindanao that aired in 1979. Southern Broadcasting Network Davao's newscast was aired locally. The newscast last aired in 1993.

=== 1999-2014: As Testigo ===
Its main newscaster is Tek Ocampo; he started with Testigo (first named Testigo: GMA Super Balita) on October 4, 1999, and made a name as a national reporter for GMA News when he left the show in 2002. After his stint with GMA Manila, he returned to Davao to anchor the program again.

To strengthen the regional network's commitment of bringing the latest, most credible and most comprehensive news from the region, in February 2013, the newscast started its international broadcast on GMA News TV International alongside other regional newscasts Balitang Amianan (now One North Central Luzon) and Balitang Bisdak.

Testigo ended its 15-year run on November 7, 2014.

=== 2014-2016: As 24 Oras Southern Mindanao ===
On November 10, 2014, the newscast adopted the branding of its now-main newscast 24 Oras as 24 Oras Southern Mindanao, following their change of graphics and theme music of the network's flagship newscast of the same name.

On February 1, 2016, this program became the only GMA regional newscast to use the 24 Oras branding after two of its other regional newscasts reverted back to their original names, Balitang Amianan (now One North Central Luzon) and Balitang Bisdak (since 1999).

=== 2016-2017: As 24 Oras Davao ===
On October 3, 2016, 24 Oras Southern Mindanao changed once again its branding simply to 24 Oras Davao. The rebranding coincided to the 17th anniversary of the regional network's news department alongside GMA Cebu's Balitang Bisdak, as well as expanding out the coverage of GMA Dagupan's Balitang Amianan.

On January 2, 2017, the newscast updated its opening billboard, soundtrack, and lower third graphics similar to 24 Oras, together with other sister newscasts Balitang Amianan and Balitang Bisdak.

On April 17, 2017, senior correspondent Real Sorroche was promoted as anchor of the newscast with the launch of his segment Usapang Real.

=== 2017-Present: As GMA Regional TV One Mindanao ===
After 24 Oras Davao, GMA Regional TV launched a news program covering the entire Mindanao island called GMA Regional TV One Mindanao. The newscast is also considered the successor for other news programs produced by GMA for Mindanao, namely 24 Oras Northern Mindanao (formerly Testigo Northern Mindanao, from 2013 to 2015) of GMA Northern Mindanao and Soccksargen Isyu Karon (from 2010 to 2011) and Flash Bulletin (from 2010 to 2015) of GMA General Santos. At the same time, GMA Cagayan de Oro reopened its studios with former relief anchor and correspondent Clyde Macascas (later replaced by Cyril Chaves, Ethel Ipanag, and James Paolo Yap), which is used by the newscast. Before the launch of its studio, reports and headlines from Cagayan de Oro and the rest of Northern Mindanao and Caraga are aired live from the GMA Cagayan de Oro Control Room. The Zamboanga, Sulu, Butuan, Kidapawan, Cotabato, Surigao, and Tandag stations were formerly direct satellite stations to GMA-7 Manila before being reassigned as relays to GMA Davao since August 28, 2017. From Soccsksargen, BARMM, and Zamboanga Peninsula (including Zamboanga City), the newscast brings reports and headlines; it was the only one that used Cebuano and Filipino for the Mindanaoan newscast from August 28, 2017, to November 24, 2019, and switched to full Cebuano language on November 25, 2019.

On May 6, 2019, the newscast unveiled a minor revision of its title card, changing its font color to green, reflecting its co-produced GMA Regional TV Weekend News (later Regional TV Weekend News, now Regional TV News), which was launched on May 11. One Mindanao was relaunched on May 6, 2019, adopting graphics and studio sets for Davao and Cagayan de Oro stations from the national newscast. In addition, the program opens its doors for viewers to become its live studio audience every Friday, similar to its sister regional newscast GMA Regional TV Balitang Bisdak.

Real Sorroche was last seen anchoring the newscast on July 1, 2021, and later eventually left the newscast in the same year for unknown reasons. Tek Ocampo left the newscast on September 17, 2021, to run for politics and was elected as City Councilor of the 1st District of Davao City. Co-anchors and correspondents Jandi Esteban, Cyril Chaves, and Rgil Relator joined Hilomen-Velasco in the anchor team on September 20, 2021, all taking turns anchoring the newscast and using the two-anchor format that the other regional newscasts adopted.

The program started using the newly inaugurated and opened studios of the GMA General Santos Station on March 14, 2022, and the GMA Zamboanga Station on March 27, 2022, now in tandem with the GMA Cagayan de Oro Station and GMA Davao Station. Co-anchors and news producers Efren Mamac (Thursday co-anchor) and Jestoni Jumamil (Tuesday co-anchor) were added to the newscast's roster of anchors from May 1, 2022, until August 4, 2024, making the newscast the first GMA Regional TV newscast to adopt the 4-anchor format, albeit with the anchors taking turns in anchoring the newscast.

On August 4, 2024, co-anchor and correspondent Jestoni Jumamil announced that he would be having his final appearance as the program's anchor, leaving Hilomen-Velasco, Chaves, and Mamac as the remaining anchors for the newscast.

On August 30, 2024, Krissa Dapitan marked her final appearance.

Three days later, on September 2, 2024, the newscast tweaked a major revision of its title card. It changed its font color to blue, removed the logo for GMA Regional TV, and changed the graphics and OBB to reflect it under GMA Integrated News and GMA News Online.

28 days later, on September 30, 2024, the GMA Integrated News OBB replaced the GMA Regional TV's own OBB. The display of the headlines is also changed, with the main headline serving as the title and the program's name serving as the subtitle. With this change, Chaves and Mamac have been alternating as Hilomen-Velasco's co-anchor, and Mamac moved to the General Santos bureau.

On May 9, 2025, the OBB changed, and Al Torres officially retired, being replaced by Weng dela Peña.

On September 29, 2025, the news program became available via livestream on GMA Regional TV's social media accounts, alongside Balitang Bisdak, One Western Visayas, and One North Central Luzon.

However, on June 29, 2026, to conform with the newest regional newscast, Ratsada Balita, the second-to-last words of GMA Regional TV newscasts, including One Mindanao, is changed to red, signaling the end of the integrated era. Likewise, the GMA News intro is used. Also Efren Mamac who has been a co-anchor for One Mindanao for almost 2 years in General Santos City, returns to field reporting as well.

== Anchors ==
- Sarah Hilomen-Velasco (Main anchor, GMA Davao)
- Cyril Chaves (Co-anchor and News Producer, GMA Cagayan de Oro)
- James Paolo Yap (Co-anchor and News Producer, GMA Cagayan De Oro)

== Correspondents ==
- Jandi Esteban
- Rgil Relator (Fill-in anchor for Sarah Hilomen-Velasco)
- Danica Raneses (News Producer, Davao)
- Efren Mamac (News Producer, General Santos)

== Former anchors and reporters ==
- Temujin "Tek" Ocampo (Main anchor; 1999-2002, 2005-21)
- Cherry Maning (Co-anchor; 2012-14)
- Real Sorroche (Co-anchor; 2013-21)
- Jun Digamon (Co-anchor; 2006-15)
- Jestoni Jumamil (General Santos Co-anchor; 2022-24 and correspondent)
- Vladimir Fernando
- Solomon Gonzales
- Brecil Kempis
- LJ Lindaan
- Derf Maiz
- Fem Nacario
- Richy Nalagon
- Julius Pacot
- Jett Pogoy
- Rose Bernales
- Sheryll Lou Pontillas
- Mariz Posadas
- Antoinette Principe (Co-anchor; 2010-12)
- Jennifer Solis
- Jan Bautista
- Dotty Ibanez
- Madonna Timbal-Senajon
- Leo Villareal
- Marlon Palma Gil
- Helen Quiñanola
- Jesrel Himang
- John Paul Seniel^{†}
- Clyde Macascas
- Ferdinandh Cabrera
- Richard Grande
- Ethel Ipanag
- Chyn Sabute
- Sheillah Vergara-Rubio^{†} (Senior correspondent)
- PJ Dela Peña (Correspondent)
- Abbey Caballero (General Santos correspondent)
- Earl John Balungay
- Krissa Dapitan (Zamboanga Co-anchor and correspondent)
- Kent Abrigana (Davao correspondent)

== Segments ==
- Agri News
- Alerto Mindanao
- At Home with GMA Regional TV
- Balitang Barangay
- Bangon Mindanao
- Bida Ka Mindanao
- Breaking News
- Campus Update
- D Best ka Mom
- E-News
- Extra Income
- Fiesta Mindanao
- GMA Weather
- Hanepbuhay
- Hayop sa Balita
- Health Watch
- Hulicam
- Kapuso Fiesta
- Kapuso Serbisyo
- Kwento ng Pilipino
- Kumbira
- May Trabaho Ka
- Mindanao Karun
- My Mindanao
- Panahon Karon
- Price Watch
- Ratsada Mindanao
- RTV Presents
- Serbisyong Totoo
- #SpreadKindness
- Suroy Ta
- Tatak Mindanao
- Time Out
- Usapang Real
- Viral Now
- 'Yan ang Pinoy!
