= Una Ka BAI =

- Genre: News broadcasting
- Presented by: Marlon Palma Gil; Sheillah Vergara Rubio^{†}; Dotty Ibanez; Sara Duterte
- Country of origin: Philippines
- Original language: Cebuano

Production
- Camera setup: Multiple-camera setup
- Running time: 45-60 minutes
- Production company: GMA News and Public Affairs

Original release
- Network: GMA Davao
- Release: October 8, 2007 – April 24, 2015

Una Ka BAI!: Una sa Balita (lit. 'You're First, My Friend: First in the News'), also known as Una Ka BAI!: Balita At Iba Pa is a Philippine television news broadcasting show program broadcast by GMA Davao. Originally hosted by Derf Maiz, Sarah Hilomen-Velasco and MK Sobrecarey, it premiered on October 8, 2007. The newscast concluded on April 24, 2015. Marlon Palma Gil, Shielah Vergara-Rubio^{†}, Dotty Ibanez and Sara Duterte served as the final hosts.

== Overview ==
The program registered an increase of 2.1 percent from 6.6 percent in October to 8.7 in partial November 2013 based on monthly data from ratings service ABS-CBN only received 5.8%. provider Nielsen TV Audience Measurement.

Without saying goodbyes after 7 years, it had their final broadcast last April 24, 2015, as part of the streamlining of regional operations of GMA, after the broadcast, the on-air staff of the program were retrenched by the network's management.

GMA Davao would not have a morning news program regional morning newscast until 5 years later, with the launch of At Home with GMA Regional TV.

== Final hosts ==
- Marlon Palma Gil
- Sheillah Vergara-Rubio^{†}
- Dotty Ibanez
- Sara Duterte

== Former hosts ==
- Cherry Maning
- Lanley Guillermo
- Sarah Hilomen-Velasco
- Derf Hanzel Maiz
- MK Sobrecarey
- Paulo Molina
- Nichole Vanessa Layno
- Anna Angelica Sotto
- Darrell "Uncle D" Blatchley
