= DXGM-AM =

Radio station in Davao City, Philippines

Super Radyo Davao (DXGM)
- Davao City; Philippines
- Broadcast area: Davao Region and surrounding areas
- Frequency: 1125 kHz
- Branding: GMA Super Radyo DXGM 1125

Programming
- Languages: Cebuano, Filipino
- Format: News, Public Affairs, Talk
- Network: Super Radyo

Ownership
- Owner: GMA Network Inc.
- Sister stations: Barangay LS 103.5; GMA 5 Davao; GTV 27 Davao

History
- First air date: 1977 (on 900 kHz); March 9, 1996 (on 1125 kHz)
- Former frequencies: 900 kHz (1977–1994)
- Call sign meaning: Global Media Arts (legal name)

Technical information
- Licensing authority: NTC
- Power: 10,000 watts

Links
- Website: www.gmanetwork.com/radio

DXGM (1125 AM) Super Radyo is a radio station owned and operated by GMA Network. The stations studio is located at GMA Network Complex, Shrine Hills, Matina, Davao City, while its transmitter is located in Ma-a, Davao City.
