= Byaheng DO30 =

Philippine television show

- Title card
- Genre: Public affairs
- Directed by: Derf Maiz
- Presented by: Jehtrond Huelar; Kessia Tar-Amora
- Starring: Sebastian Duterte
- Country of origin: Philippines
- Original language: Cebuano

Production
- Executive producer: Harvey James Lanticse
- Production locations: Davao City, Philippines
- Camera setup: Multiple-camera setup
- Running time: 60 minutes
- Production companies: City Information Office of Davao City; GMA News and Public Affairs; GMA Regional TV

Original release
- Network: GMA Davao; GMA Cagayan de Oro; GMA General Santos; GMA Zamboanga
- Release: December 18, 2016 – December 25, 2022

Byaheng DO30 is a Philippine television public affairs show broadcast by GMA Davao. It premiered on December 18, 2016 and ended on December 25, 2022.

== Overview ==
The TV show captures the 30 major projects and programs Davao Mayor Sara Duterte intends to accomplish in three years—thus, DO30 (shortened version of doing 30 projects and a play on words for Sara's family name). All these projects and programs respond to the 10 priority sectors, which include poverty alleviation; infrastructure development; solid waste management; health; education; agriculture; tourism; transportation planning and traffic management; peace and order; and disaster risk and mitigation. The show also highlights and explains the ordinances of the Davao City council. It also highlights features and updates of local government units across the Davao Region.

The program marked the return of the younger Duterte on GMA, more than a year after she hosted Una Ka BAI.

On August 5, 2018, the program can be seen in other GMA Regional TV stations in Cagayan de Oro, as well as its relay stations across Mindanao including General Santos and Zamboanga.

On July 3, 2022, the succeeding Mayor of Davao City, Sebastian "Baste" Duterte, became a host for the program and succeeded his sister Sara who became the Vice President of the Philippines on June 30, 2022.

In 2023, it was replaced and rebranded with the name "Madayaw Davao", a weekly live morning show produced by the City Information Office, with Derf Maiz, Sheillah Vergara-Rubio, and Real Sorroche serving as hosts.

== Hosts ==
- Jehtrond Huelar
- Kessia Tar-Amora
- Reymar Tero
- Marlo Brua
- Potpot Marañon
- Chyn Sabute

== Former Hosts ==
- Sara Duterte (now Vice President of the Philippines)

== Accolades ==
Accolades received by Byaheng DO30
Year	Awards	Category	Recipient	Result	Ref.
2019	Anak TV Seal Awards	Anak TV Seal	Byaheng DO30	Won	
2020	42nd Catholic Mass Media Awards	Special Citation: News Magazine Program	Byaheng DO30	Won	
