= DXRV-FM =

Radio station in Davao City, Philippines

Barangay LS Davao (DXRV)
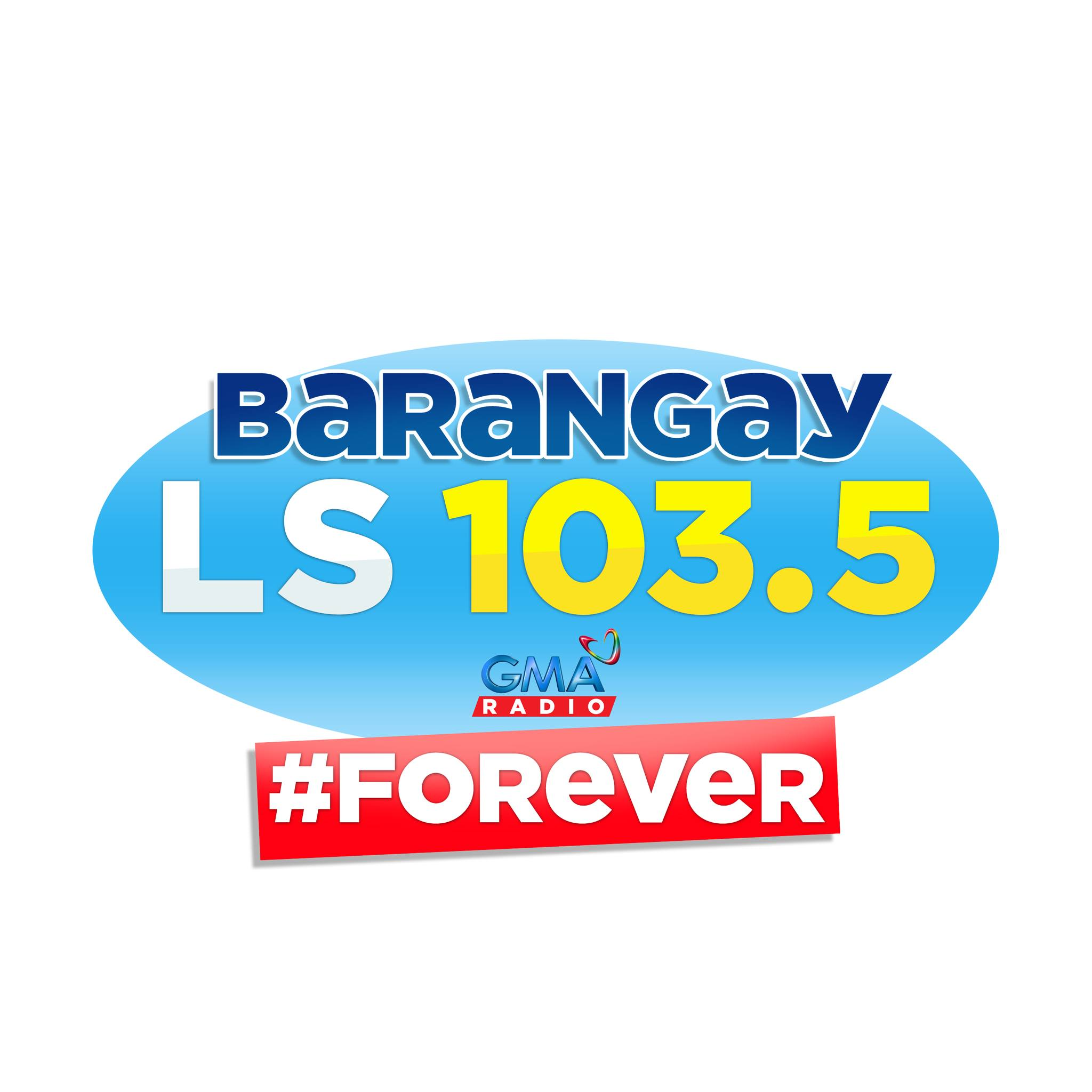
- Davao City; Philippines
- Broadcast area: Metro Davao and surrounding areas
- Frequency: 103.5 MHz
- Branding: Barangay LS 103.5

Programming
- Languages: Cebuano, Filipino
- Format: Contemporary MOR, OPM, News
- Network: Barangay LS

Ownership
- Owner: GMA Network Inc.
- Sister stations: DXGM Super Radyo; GMA TV 5 Davao; GTV 27 Davao

History
- First air date: March 9, 1996
- Former call signs: DXSS-FM (1977–1995, under the partnership of SBN)
- Former names: Campus Radio (1996–2002); Wow FM (2002–2014)
- Former frequencies: 97.9 MHz (1977–1995, under the partnership of SBN)
- Call sign meaning: None; sequentially assigned

Technical information
- Licensing authority: NTC
- Class: C, D, E
- Power: 10,000 watts
- ERP: 15,000 watts

Links
- Website: www.gmanetwork.com

DXRV (103.5 FM), broadcasting as Barangay LS 103.5, is a radio station owned and operated by GMA Network. The station's studio and transmitter are located at GMA Complex, Broadcast Ave., Shrine Hills, Matina, Davao City.

== History ==
=== 1996-2014: Campus Radio/Wow FM ===
The station, along with sister station DXGM, was inaugurated on March 9, 1996, as Campus Radio 103.5 with the slogan "Forever". It aired a Top 40 format. Its first home was at Amesco Bldg. along Magsaysay St.

In late 1998, the station switched to a mass-based format and changed its slogan to "Nindota Ah!", adapted from its Cebu station. On July 29, 2002, it rebranded as 103.5 Wow FM and changed its slogan to "Wow! Nindota Ah!".

=== 2014-present: Barangay ===
Logos

2014–2017

2017–2019

2023–2026

On February 17, 2014, as part of RGMA's brand unification, the station relaunched under the Barangay FM network and carried-over the slogan "Isang Bansa, Isang Barangay". Following the launch, it began simulcasting a handful of programs from its flagship station in Manila. In 2020, the station re-adapted its original slogan "Forever!".

On 2025, it begin simulcasting selected news programs from its sister station DXGM Super Radyo namely Super Radyo Super Balita every weekdays 6:00 am to 7:00 am and also Super Radyo Balita sa Udto every weekdays 11:00 am to 11:30 am.

On April 5, 2026, the station adapted the Barangay LS branding from its flagship station, and re-adapted its former slogan "Nindota Ah!" as its secondary slogan.

== See also ==
- GMA Network
- DXGM-AM
