= DXBB-AM =

Defunct radio station in General Santos, Philippines

DXBB
- General Santos; Philippines
- Broadcast area: Southern Mindanao and surrounding areas
- Frequency: 1107 kHz

Programming
- Format: Silent

Ownership
- Owner: Soccsksargen Broadcasting Network
- Sister stations: 91.1 Pacman Radio

History
- First air date: May 18, 1996
- Last air date: 2019
- Former names: Bisig Bayan (1996–1999); Super Radyo (1999–early 2000s); Radyo Alerto (2011–2019)
- Call sign meaning: Bisig Bayan (former branding)

Technical information
- Licensing authority: NTC

Links
- Website: http://www.radyoalerto.com/

DXBB (1107 AM) was a radio station owned and operated by Soccsksargen Broadcasting Network.

== Profile ==
The station was established by GMA Network on May 18, 1996, along with DXCJ. It went off the air in the early 2000s due to resource problems.

In March 2011, DXBB was acquired by Soccsksargen Broadcasting Network, a company owned by some of Manny Pacquiao's friends, and was relaunched as Radyo Alerto. It also served as an affiliate of GMA's DZBB in Manila. It went off the air sometime in 2019.

In 2021, parts of the station's programming were revived in Barangay FM 102.3 under the Super Radyo banner.
