= Isyu ug Istorya =

Philippine television documentary show

- Genre: Documentary
- Written by: John Paul Seniel
- Presented by: John Paul Seniel; Jan Bautista; LJ Lindaan
- Country of origin: Philippines
- Original language: Cebuano
- No. of episodes: 31 + 1 special

Production
- Executive producer: Cel Rosales-Amore
- Production locations: Mindanao, Philippines
- Running time: 60 minutes
- Production company: GMA News and Public Affairs

Original release
- Network: GMA Davao; GMA Northern Mindanao; GMA General Santos
- Release: July 26, 2014 – February 28, 2015

Related
- Isyu Mindanao

Isyu ug Istorya (lit. 'Issues and Stories') is a Philippine television documentary show broadcast by GMA Network in the Mindanao region. Hosted by John Paul Seniel, it premiered on July 19, 2014. The show concluded on February 28, 2015 with a total of 31 episodes. It served as a spin-off of Isyu Mindanao.

== Synopsis ==
The program was primarily and exclusively tackle issues on Mindanao as they look back the biggest stories and features in all of Mindanao-based programs of GMA Network. Essentially something that made every Mindanao people not only aware of what is happening but also proud of what they have or what they are.

The program encouraged the viewers to be storytellers and chroniclers in which they achieve lasting and sustainable peace, understanding and progress aided by the stories from Mindanao.

== Anchors ==
- John Paul Seniel

Reporters

- LJ Lindaan
- Jennifer Solis
- Leigh Fortich

== Simulcasting areas ==
- Iligan
- Ozamiz
- Bukidnon
- Dipolog
- Pagadian
- Kidapawan
- Cotabato
