= Bongga! =

- Genre: Variety
- Presented by: Jigo Mambo; John Arceo; Leez Quimpo; Em Capalla; Joan Jalandoni
- Country of origin: Philippines
- Original language: Hiligaynon

Production
- Camera setup: Multiple-camera setup
- Running time: 60 minutes
- Production company: GMA Entertainment TV

Original release
- Network: GMA Iloilo
- Release: October 24, 1999 – September 2, 2007

Bongga! (lit. 'Extravagant!') is a Philippine television variety show broadcast by GMA Iloilo and GMA Bacolod. Hosted by Jigo Mambo, John Arceo, Leez Quimpo, Em Capalla and Joan Jalandoni, it premiered on October 24, 1999. The show concluded on September 2, 2007 for the past eight (8) years.

The show was popular for its segments "Pok Gi Pok", a gay boxing challenge where two gay contestants battle it out using oversized hand gloves; and "Bongga Babes", a bikini-open contest featuring the sexiest babes in Western Visayas. It also featured some of the hottest Ilonggo bands and dance groups in Western Visayas, with the special participation of some of the most popular GMA Kapuso stars flown in from Manila every now and then to join the "Bongga!" gang. Because of the show's own brand of fun and vibrant entertainment rarely seen in other local variety shows in Visayas and Mindanao, "Bongga" has earned the tag "Pinasahi sa Tanan" (Different among others).

== Telecast History ==
Launched in October 24, 1999, "Bongga"'s format was musical variety and remotely taped across different shopping malls in Iloilo and Bacolod. The original hosts were Hector Gloria, Lara Alba, Debbie Pelor and Ansab Urpiana, with 93.5 Campus Radio (now Barangay 93.5) DJs Jigo Mambo and Billy d' Kid acting as on-air video jocks (VJs). However, after the show's first season, "Bongga" was reformatted to a gay-oriented variety program, with Jigo Mambo and Billy d' Kid joining Hector as main hosts. It started dishing out portions like "Palarong Pambakla", "Pok Gi Pok" and "Binibining Bonggay" that generated a lot of controversy among the conservative groups in Western Visayas. Despite the criticism, "Bongga" got high ratings and it helped them overcome the more established "Barkadahan sa S na S" of ABS-CBN TV-4 Bacolod.

Soon after, "Bongga" began to tape episodes in other places and campuses in the Philippines. The show also earned the distinction as the only musical variety show that aired an episode from a prison building, when they held a show at the Iloilo Rehabilitation Center in 2002. The show earned a tagline "Kalingawan sg Masa" (Entertainment of the Masses/Aliwan para sa Masa) as viewership slowly increased and soon became the top local variety show in Western Visayas.

In 2003, the show reformatted back to its original musical variety format while retaining popular segments. Original host Jigo Mambo was joined by new main hosts John Arceo (who came from "Bongga"'s defunct rival show "Barkadahan sa S na S" of ABS-CBN TV-4 Bacolod and also a character actor), new GMA Iloilo discovery Joan Jalandoni, and Gilbert "Onal" Golez (who was born in Iloilo and had a short stint in Manila as a singer), with regular performers from Bacolod and Iloilo joining them weekly. Later on the show added former Ilongga beauty queens Apol Arro and Leez Quimpo to complete the main cast.

In August 2005, the show set a record in Western Visayas as the only local variety show that attracted more than 20,000 live audience when they taped an episode at SM City Iloilo featuring stars from "Darna" and "Encantadia" led by Angel Locsin, Dennis Trillo, Sunshine Dizon, Karylle and Jennylyn Mercado. "Bongga" also served as a front-act for Eat Bulaga during the Grand Kapuso Fans Day held at the Iloilo Sports Complex in Iloilo City last September 17, 2005, performing before a record crowd of 60,000 people. Among the stars that graced the Kapuso Fans Day Special were the SexBomb Girls, Janice de Belen, Gelli de Belen, Carmina Villarroel, Ogie Alcasid and German Moreno.

== The All-New "Bongga!" ==
In October 2005, "Bongga" was relaunched and was now under the production of GMA Entertainment Group. A new logo banner was unveiled during the show's grand press conference that culminated with a grand anniversary show held at the Iloilo Freedom Grandstand with Kapuso stars Nadine Samonte, Ara Mina and Alfred Vargas as special guests. Over 20,000 people witnessed the event.

== Milestone episodes ==
Last January 27, 2006, talents of "Bongga" hosted the GMA Kapuso Night at the Iloilo Freedom Grandstand that featured some Kapuso stars from "Etheria", GMA KiliTV, and "SOP". The event was attended by more than 30,000 people.

On April 2, 2006, 24 Oras news anchor and TV host Mel Tiangco guested in "Bongga!" to promote the upcoming Easter Sunday episode of "Mel and Joey" where the entire show will feature the tourist spots and delicacies of Iloilo and Bacolod together with the StarStruck Final 4 of Marky Cielo, Jackie Rice, Gian Carlos and Iwa Moto. The particular episode was shown on Easter Sunday.

On April 29, 2006, "Bongga!" host Cherry Mae Barbo participated during the Aliwan Festival's Reyna ng Aliwan pageant as Iloilo's representative. Barbo won 2nd runner-up despite not winning any special awards.

On August 5, 2006, "Bongga!" once again successfully staged a big show during the 2nd Grand Kapuso Fans Day held at the Iloilo Sports Complex Covered Gym in Iloilo City. Over 10,000 people attended the event.

In October 2006, "Bongga!" was active on tour again as part of GMA's Kapuso Weekend Fever which featured big-named GMA Kapuso Stars touring Iloilo, Bacolod, Cebu and Davao. The show also celebrated its 7th anniversary on October 13, 2006 at the Iloilo Freedom Grandstand, with Nadine Samonte, Marvin Agustin and Cueshé as guests.

On January 26, 2007, "Bongga!" once again staged a successful show at the Iloilo Freedom Grandstand during GMA's Kapuso Night where selected GMA stars led by Wendell Ramos and Jennylyn Mercado performed before a huge crowd. On January 27, 2007, the show promoted the new telefantasya "Super Twins and "Lupin during the Dinagyang eve show at SM City. During the summer season, "Bongga!" was able to cash in on GMA's nationwide "Sumamer Ka Na" campaign by bringing viewers to different festivals around the country like "Aliwan Festival" and "Wow Villa".

== Reformat ==
On the second week of July, the show underwent a major revamp as GMA Iloilo publicly announced auditions for new on-cam talents and production staff. While the transition was on-going, Jigo Mambo, Leez Quimpo, Em Capalla and Angel handled the hosting chores.

Last July 26, 2006, "Bongga!" held a musical special entitled "Kapuso Serbis-Yo! Live Bongga!" (Service! Live Extravagant!) at the Iloilo Freedom Grandstand. Despite the intermittent weather, the show went on and showcased different local talents from the field of music and dance from different genres. The hosts talked less and gave the spotlight to local talents complemented with an explosive performance by Kamikazee band from Manila. The new format of "more production numbers, less talk" was later on introduced a week after the musical special. "Bongga"'s new all musical variety format was meant to keep the show a notch higher than its competitors and be at par with the Manila variety shows.

In August 2007, "Bongga!" lost out to rival show "Sabado Barkada" of ABS-CBN TV-4 Bacolod in the ratings game based on the July ratings for Nielsen Media Research in Iloilo City. Although both shows were airing on different days (Sabado Barkada airs on Saturdays), the comparative ratings showed that "Sabado" posted higher ratings. "Bongga!" decided to bring back the parlor games it was known for, complete with elements of reality TV.

== The Dinagyang Controversy ==
On January 28, 2007 "Bongga" hosts Jigo Mambo and Joan Jalandoni with Kapuso talents Gabby Eigenmann and Sunshine Dizon joined forces with some national and local talents of ABS-CBN and Sky Cable to host and perform at the Dinagyang awarding ceremonies. As part of the ceremonies, both ABS-CBN and GMA Network provided their talents to entertain the crowd while waiting for the results. The organizers gave 30 minutes each for both networks to provide entertainment. GMA Network was allowed to go first, with Gabby Eigenmann and Sunshine Dizon performing separately. Only Gabby was able to complete his number while Sunshine's performance was abruptly cut due to some delays experienced before the show.

Video footages from GMA Iloilo's newscast "Ratsada" showed two instances that Sunshine Dizon's performance was sabotaged. The first footage showed Jigo Mambo supposedly approaching her for a short interview after her number but their microphone audio went off and an audio from Sky Cable's talent came in instead. The second footage showed that Sunshine started her second performance when a lady host from ABS-CBN came up the stage and hyped the crowd with the arrival of ABS-CBN talent Matt Evans of "Pedro Penduko" fame. With her was "Bongga"'s Joan Jalandoni who was there to control the situation but her microphone went off.

The apparent sabotage earned the ire of Sunshine Dizon and her mother Dorothy Laforteza. Also the management of ABS-CBN TV-10 Iloilo was hands off after the incident, denying any involvement on their part. The Dinagyang incident gave 15 minutes of nationwide fame for the two "Bongga" hosts Jigo and Joan, since the whole incident was aired over GMA's "24 Oras". Joan was also among those interviewed about the incident together with Sunshine Dizon, Gabby Eigenmann and ABS-CBN TV-10 Iloilo Station Manager Charie Ginete-Ilon.

== Farewell Episode ==
"Bongga!" aired its farewell episode last September 2, 2007. At the closing credits, the message that read Madamo nga salamat, Kapuso! 1999-2007 (Thank you very much Kapuso) was shown on the screen capped with the Kapuso logo.

"Bongga!" went off the air at the height of its popularity, and it consistently retained its status as one of the premier top-rating local variety shows outside of Metro Manila.

== Hosts ==
- Jigo Mambo
- John Arceo
- Leez Quimpo
- Em Capalla
- Joan Jalandoni

Former co-hosts

- Hector Gloria (1999–2003)
- Billy d' Kid (1999–2003)
- Debbie Pelor (1999)
- Ansab Urpiana (1999–2000)
- Lara Alba (1999–2000)
- Ruth (1999)
- Tricia Aguirre (1999)
- Sunshine Gregorio (2000)
- Teresa Bacabac (2003–2004)
- Candy Doronila (2000)
- Varvin Hope Simon Hiñola (2005–2006) - recurring
- April Rose Arro (2003–2005; 2007)
- Tuska Bianca Alivio (2003–2005)
- Bonggastruck's Ralph, Kara, Mark, Jhun Fil, Gladys, DT, Michael, Carlo (2005)
- Charles Ea (2006)
- Cherry May Barbo (2006–2007)
- Kenneth Villanueva (2007)
- Gilbert Onal Golez (2003–2007)
- Carlo Quiat (2004–2006)

Guest co-hosts

- KC Montero
- Jake Cuenca
- Gian Carlos
- Luke Mijares
- Sunshine Dizon
- Tiya Pusit
- Francine Prieto
- Iwa Moto
- Jolina Magdangal
- Paolo Ballesteros
- Arnel Ignacio

== Directors ==
- Tricia Aguirre
- Moonlight Lady
- Elmo Benguan
- Reggie Molina
- Varvin Hope Simon Hiñola

== Accolades ==
- KBP Golden Dove Awardee- Best Provincial Variety Show (2001)
- No. 1 Local Variety Show (Western Visayas) according to PSRC Survey (2000–2005)
- Reyna ng Aliwan 2nd Runner Up Aliwan Festival- Bongga host Cherry May Barbo (2006)
