= I Heart Movies =

Television channel in the Philippines

- Logo used since April 5, 2021
- Country: Philippines
- Broadcast area: Philippines
- Network: GMA Network
- Headquarters: GMA Network Center, EDSA corner Timog Avenue, Diliman, Quezon City, Philippines

Programming
- Languages: Filipino (main); English (secondary)
- Picture format: 720p HDTV (downscaled to 16:9 480i for the SDTV feed)

Ownership
- Owner: GMA Network, Inc.
- Sister channels: GMA; GTV; Hallypop (defunct); Heart of Asia; Pinoy Hits (defunct); GMA Pinoy TV; GMA Life TV; GMA News TV

History
- Launched: March 22, 2021; 5 years ago (test broadcast); April 5, 2021; 5 years ago (official launch)

Links
- Website: gmanetwork.com/entertainment/tv/i_heart_movies

Availability

Terrestrial
- Digital terrestrial television: Channel 7.06 (Mega Manila, Ilocos Sur, Metro Naga and Metro Cebu); Channel 6.06 (Metro Iloilo); Channel 10.06 (Metro Baguio/Pangasinan and Tacloban); Channel 11.06 (Iligan); Channel 12.06 (Batangas, Legazpi, Metro Cagayan de Oro and Bukidnon); Channel 13.06 (Metro Bacolod); Channel 5.06 (Roxas City, Metro Davao and Mt. Province); Channel 8.06 (General Santos); Channel 9.06 (Zamboanga City)
- GMA Affordabox: Channel 4

I Heart Movies (stylized as i ❤ movies) is a Philippine free-to-air television network owned and operated by GMA Network Inc. The channel was on test broadcast from March 22 to 31, 2021, and was officially launched on April 5, 2021. It operates every Monday to Sunday from 6:00 a.m. to 12:00 midnight.

== Overview ==
I Heart Movies consists of domestically-originated and Filipino-dubbed international films from various distributors, along with internal studio GMA Pictures, as well as ABS-CBN Studios/Star Cinema, MQ Studios, Unitel Pictures, Regal Entertainment, Viva Films, The IdeaFirst Company, APT Entertainment, OctoArts Films, FPJ Productions, and Brightlight Productions. Its film rights do not conflict with those of other film networks.

== Programming ==
I Heart Movies primarily broadcasts a mix of Filipino and international films through recurring movie blocks. Among these are Takilya Throwback, which features classic local films; Pinoy Movie Date, highlighting contemporary Filipino titles; and Block Screening, which presents popular foreign movies. The channel has also carried selected dramas, variety programs, and news broadcasts in simulcast.

=== Original programming ===
- Takilya Throwback
- Pinoy Movie Date
- Block Screening

=== Simulcasted programs ===
- Unbreak My Heart
- Voltes V: Legacy
- Royal Blood
- Mga Lihim ni Urduja
- Luv Is: Caught in His Arms
- Hearts on Ice
- Love Before Sunrise
- The Write One
- Maging Sino Ka Man
- The Master Cutter

=== Former programming ===
- Timeless Telesine (April 5, 2021 – July 14, 2024)
- 24 Oras / 24 Oras Weekend
- All-Out Sundays
- Balitanghali / Balita Ko
- The Voice Generations (delayed telecast)
