= Heart of Asia Channel =

Philippine digital television channel

- Country: Philippines
- Broadcast area: Nationwide
- Network: GMA Network
- Headquarters: GMA Network Center, EDSA corner Timog Avenue, Diliman, Quezon City, Philippines

Programming
- Language: Filipino
- Picture format: 720p HDTV (downscaled to 16:9 480i for the SDTV feed)

Ownership
- Owner: GMA Network, Inc.
- Sister channels: GMA; GTV; Hallypop (defunct); I Heart Movies; Pinoy Hits (defunct); GMA Pinoy TV; GMA Life TV; GMA News TV

History
- Launched: June 12, 2020; 6 years ago (test broadcast); June 29, 2020; 6 years ago (official launch)

Links
- Website: gmanetwork.com/entertainment/tv/heart_of_asia_channel

Availability

Terrestrial
- Digital terrestrial television: Channel 7.03 (Mega Manila, Metro Cebu, Metro Naga and Ilocos Sur); Channel 11.03 (Iligan); Channel 10.03 (Metro Baguio, Dagupan and Tacloban City); Channel 12.03 (Batangas, Legaspi, Metro Cagayan de Oro and Bukidnon); Channel 13.03 (Metro Bacolod); Channel 6.03 (Metro Iloilo); Channel 5.03 (Roxas, Metro Davao and Mt. Province); Channel 8.03 (General Santos); Channel 9.03 (Zamboanga City)
- GMA Affordabox: Channel 3

Heart of Asia (stylized as HEART OF asia) is a Philippine free-to-air television network owned and operated by GMA Network, Inc. The channel was on test broadcast from June 12 to 28, 2020, and was officially launched on June 29, 2020. It operates daily from 6:00 a.m. to 12:00 midnight.

Heart of Asia was named after the programming block of the same name from GMA Network. The channel focuses on Filipino-dubbed Asian dramas, Films and Animated Series (Bida League).

== History ==
In 2019, GMA Network announced plans to invest in its second phase of transition into digital television, including a partnership with American entertainment company Jungo TV and Philippine media company Solar Entertainment Corporation (SEC) to distribute content across all of its channels. In preparation of releasing the GMA Affordabox and as part of the network's 70th founding anniversary, GMA Network launched Heart of Asia as part of their digital channel lineup of DZBB-DTV Channel 15.

On June 7, 2020, GMA Network instructed audiences to re-scan their digital TV boxes on June 12 to receive their new channel lineup, which includes GMA, GMA News TV and Heart of Asia Channel.

On June 12, 2020, Heart of Asia was on a test broadcast with provisional programs airing, while showing promotional material for the upcoming programs. The channel officially debuted on June 29 with regular programming.

On February 27, 2023, Heart of Asia switched its broadcast from a 4:3 format to a 16:9 anamorphic widescreen format. The change allowed for a widescreen presentation, optimizing the viewing experience for viewers with compatible widescreen televisions.

== Ratings ==
According to GMA Network's Chairman and CEO Atty. Felipe L. Gozon, the Heart of Asia channel ranked fifth in the ratings scoreboard, garnering a 4.9% audience share during the first quarter of 2021.
