= At Home with GMA Regional TV =

- Title card from 2023 to 2024
- Genre: News broadcasting
- Directed by: Kim Eugene V. Palma
- Presented by: Cyril Chaves; Kent Abrigana; Krissa Dapitan; Abbey Caballero
- Narrated by: Al Torres
- Country of origin: Philippines
- Original language: Cebuano

Production
- Executive producer: Earl John Balungay
- Production locations: GMA Davao Complex, Matina, Davao City; GMA Cagayan de Oro Studios, Barangay 31, Cagayan de Oro; GMA General Santos Studios, San Isidro, General Santos; GMA Zamboanga Studios, Putik, Zamboanga City
- Camera setup: Multiple-camera setup
- Running time: 30 minutes
- Production companies: GMA Integrated News; GMA Regional TV

Original release
- Network: GMA 5 Davao; GMA 35 Cagayan de Oro; GMA 8 General Santos; GMA 9 Zamboanga
- Release: June 1, 2020 – January 26, 2024

At Home with GMA Regional TV is a 2020 Philippine television news broadcasting show broadcast by GMA Davao and GMA Cagayan de Oro. Originally hosted by Rgil Relator, Cyril Chaves and Atty. Resci Rizada, it premiered on June 1, 2020, on the network's morning lineup every Monday to Friday from 8:00 AM to 8:30 AM. The program concluded on January 26, 2024 due to low ratings and decline viewership. Chaves, Kent Abrigana, Abbey Caballero and Krissa Dapitan serve as the final hosts.

== Overview ==
At Home with GMA Regional TV premiered on June 1, 2020, as Mindanao's first unified morning show, airing on GMA Davao, Cagayan de Oro, and 12 other regional stations.

The show marked GMA Davao's return to morning news production after five years and features positive stories and segments from across Mindanao.

On February 6, 2023, the show shifted to live coverage as part of GMA Regional TV's rebranding, adding news reports and interviews. Abbey Caballero and Krissa Dapitan joined as co-hosts from GMA General Santos and GMA Zamboanga, respectively.

On August 14, 2023, Kent Abrigana joined as co-host, replacing Jandi Esteban, and Cyril Chaves was named main host.

== Final segments ==
- Unang Balita
- Bantay Presyo
- BizTalk
- Spotlight
- GMA Integrated News Weather Center
- Kumbira
- Panultihon

== Final hosts ==
- Kent Abrigana (2023-24)
- Cyril Chaves (2020-24, GMA Cagayan de Oro)
- Abbey Caballero (2023-24, GMA General Santos)
- Krissa Dapitan (2023-24, GMA Zamboanga)

== Former hosts ==
- Rgil Relator (2020-21, GMA Davao)
- Atty. Resci Rizada (2020-22, GMA Davao)
- Jandi Esteban (2022-23, GMA Davao)
