= GTV (Philippine TV network) =

Philippine free-to-air television network

- Logo used since February 22, 2021
- Type: Free-to-air television network
- Country: Philippines
- Broadcast area: Nationwide
- Headquarters: GMA Network Center, EDSA corner Timog Avenue, Diliman, Quezon City, Metro Manila, Philippines

Programming
- Languages: Filipino (main); English (secondary)
- Picture format: 720p/1080p HDTV (downscaled to 16:9 480i for the SDTV feed)

Ownership
- Owner: GMA Network Inc.
- Parent: Citynet Network Marketing and Productions
- Key people: Atty. Felipe L. Gozon (Chairman and Adviser, GMA Network); Gilberto R. Duavit Jr. (President, CEO and COO, GMA Network); Felipe S. Yalong (EVP and CFO, GMA Network); Cheryl Ching-Sy (OIC for Entertainment Group, GMA Network); Atty. Annette Gozon-Valdes (Senior Vice President, GMA Network); Elvis B. Ancheta (Senior Vice President, GMA Engineering)
- Sister channels: GMA; Heart of Asia; Hallypop (defunct); I Heart Movies; Pinoy Hits (defunct); GMA Pinoy TV; GMA Life TV; GMA News TV (international)

History
- Launched: February 22, 2021; 5 years ago
- Replaced: GMA News TV (2011-2021)

Links
- Website: gmanetwork.com/gtv

Availability

Terrestrial
- Analog UHF: Listings may vary
- Digital VHF/UHF: Listings may vary
- GMA Affordabox: Channel 2
- Sky Cable (Metro Manila): Channel 24
- Sky Cable (Regional): Channel 12
- SkyTV (Metro Manila): Channel 27
- Sky Direct (Nationwide): Channel 9
- Cignal TV (Nationwide): Channel 11
- SatLite (Nationwide): Channel 11
- G Sat (Nationwide): Channel 6

GTV (standing for Good TeleVision, stylized as Gtv) is a Philippine free-to-air television network owned and operated by Citynet Network Marketing and Productions Inc., a wholly owned subsidiary of GMA Network, Inc. It was launched on February 22, 2021, replacing GMA News TV on its flagship station, DWDB-TV UHF Channel 27, and its relay stations across the Philippines.

It is the sixth overall secondary television brand of GMA Network since 1995, as Citynet Television. The network produces programs from studios located at the GMA Network Center, EDSA corner Timog Avenue, Diliman, Quezon City. The network's primary transmitter facility is located at the GMA Tower of Power site, Barangay Culiat, Tandang Sora, Quezon City.

== History ==
=== As GMA News TV (2011–2021) ===
GTV was previously known as GMA News TV, a channel focused on all-news and public service, as part of GMA News and Public Affairs' plans to expand its presence on free-to-air television as well as retaining some lifestyle and public affairs programs from its predecessor, QTV/Q. The channel was unveiled on February 7, 2011, on 24 Oras, GMA's flagship nightly newscast. The news channel launched on February 28, 2011. It launched a wide variety of news and public affairs and entertainment-produced programs to serve its audience.

From its launch to 2019, ZOE Broadcasting Network served as an originating affiliate and flagship station of GMA News TV, as a result of a blocktime lease agreement between ZOE Broadcasting and GMA's subsidiary Citynet Network Marketing and Productions in 2005, allowing the latter to lease the entire airtime of DZOE-TV 11 Manila, in exchange for upgrading the former's facilities and an off-peak timeslot for its programs on Channel 11 and GMA Network. However, due to increasing lease payments of GMA Network to ZOE Broadcasting, which is accompanied by decreased revenues of GMA, the two networks announced on April 24, 2019, that they will terminate the agreement by the end of May 2019. As a result, GMA News TV Manila was reassigned to analog Channel 27, which was being used for the digital test broadcast of GMA Network, on June 4. In turn, DTV operations of GMA were transferred to a permanent frequency, UHF Channel 15 (479.143 MHz), which had been MHz), which was being used since May 15.

In line with the government's protocol of imposing the enhanced community quarantine in Luzon (also known as "Luzon Lockdown") due to the outbreak of COVID-19 pandemic in the Philippines, GMA News TV temporarily went off-air on March 19, 2020 and returned on-air two days later, March 21, with limited broadcasting hours, with Dobol B sa News TV as a provisional programming, expanding its broadcast (for the first time, wherein the afternoon programming of DZBB was introduced and included in the program lineup) from Mondays to Sundays from 6:00 am to afternoon until the simulcast of 24 Oras (both weekday and weekend edition) and signs-off right after the newscast. On April 13, 2020, the channel resumed its regular primetime programming after 24 Oras, with the launch of New Normal: The Survival Guide, and Power Block: Serbisyong Totoo on Primetime as its provisional primetime blocktime. GMA News TV's programming was fully restored by September 21, 2020.

On November 21, 2020, Sports Interactive Network, an affiliate news portal of GMA, published an article that the network announced plans for a possible reformat of GMA News TV into a news, sports and variety channel, which is similar to the old format of Citynet Television and QTV. The plans were unveiled following GNTV's gradual shift away from its original news and public affairs channel format and towards "general" entertainment and sports since September 2020, which includes acquisition of broadcast rights to NCAA and PSL games (the main reason of GTV's rebrand), a simulcast of its sister digital channel Hallypop (until it cancelled in the fourth quarter of 2020), and additional entertainment programs from its mother station GMA Network due to increase of its commercial loads. These changes were embattled by mounting viewer criticisms, notably when the country was hit by Typhoon Goni (Rolly), where Asian dramas, cartoons and anime were aired instead of pre-empting them for round-the-clock news coverage.

=== As GTV (2021–present) ===
On February 9, 2021, GMA Network announced that its sister channel, GMA News TV, would be relaunched as GTV ("Good Television") on February 22. The presentation was dramatically overhauled on the same date of its relaunch as GTV.

According to some of the GMA executives in their media conference, which took place in the days before GTV launched, they took one year to plan on relaunching the channel as GTV due to the needs of its viewers and more variety for "young-at-heart" viewers. While retaining most in-house programs of its predecessor, GTV carries news and public affairs with the addition of entertainment, variety, lifestyle and sports programs, which is similar to the old format of what Citynet Television and QTV/Q had done before. The international counterpart of GTV's predecessor is still operational even after February 28, 2021, a decade after its original domestic counterpart was launched. Unlike its predecessor, the channel uses Taglish.

On February 27, 2023, GTV, along with other GMA Network-owned channels, switched its broadcast from the original 4:3 format to 16:9 anamorphic widescreen format. This change allowed for a widescreen presentation, optimizing the viewing experience for viewers with compatible widescreen televisions.

==== Partnership with ABS-CBN (2023–2024) ====
On June 20, 2023, GMA Network, Inc. collaborated with ABS-CBN Corporation for the simulcast of the noontime variety program It's Showtime on GTV. The show premiered on July 1, 2023. The simulcast silently ended on December 31, 2024, as It's Showtime continues to air on the main GMA Network channel and AMBS-owned All TV.

== Programming ==
GTV's programming includes game telecasts of the NCAA Philippines (from Season 96 to Season 101), as well as weekly public affairs shows and daily newscasts (including Balitanghali, State of the Nation, the TV simulcasts of DZBB-AM programs (under the name Dobol B TV)) and simulcast airing of 24 Oras, and 24 Oras Weekend, along with movie blocks, pinoy dramas, cartoons, anime, showbiz talk shows, religious, special programs, and blocktime programs similar to its sister channel GMA.

The channel was mainly targeted to youth audiences.

== Availability ==
GTV is seen via regular free-to-air television on Channel 27 in Metro Manila (in blue), Cebu, Davao and 24 other regional stations nationwide. Aside from GTV's main analog signal, it is a must-carry channel on all cable and satellite TV providers. The network is also available as a digital subchannel through GMA's main digital channels in selected areas in the Philippines.

Callsign	Ch. (UHF)	Location (Transmitter)	Coordinates
DWDB	27	Quezon City (Note: Flagship television station.)	14°40′12″N 121°3′0″E
DWHH	27	San Nicolas, Ilocos Norte (Note: Relay station)	18°8′34″N 120°35′9″E
DWHK	27	Tuguegarao	17°36′35″N 121°43′29″E
DZGP	26	Aparri	18°21′15″N 121°38′31″E
DWDG	22	Mt. Santo Tomas, Benguet	16°20′7″N 120°33′40″E
DZRG	26	Olongapo	14°51′1″N 120°16′43″E
DZDK	26	Mt. Banoy, Batangas	13°42′21″N 121°10′21″E
DWHJ	26	San Jose, Occidental Mindoro	12°21′16″N 121°3′54″E
DWHI	27	Puerto Princesa	9°48′0″N 118°44′4″E
DWHL	27	Mobo, Masbate	12°20′40″N 123°38′29″E
DZDP	28	Naga, Camarines Sur	13°37′10″N 123°11′51″E
DWJB	27	Legazpi, Albay	13°6′58″N 123°43′38″E
DXBL	27	Numancia, Aklan	11°43′5″N 122°21′41″E
DYBK	27	Roxas City	11°33′38″N 122°45′44″E
DYKV	28	Iloilo City	10°44′28″N 122°33′53″E
DYLS	27	Cebu City	10°21′49″N 123°51′13″E
DYBM	28	Valencia, Negros Oriental	9°18′23″N 123°13′50″E
DYBJ	26	Tacloban	11°14′38″N 124°57′59″E
DXAV	26	Dipolog	8°35′20″N 123°23′31″E
DXAT	22	Ozamiz	8°8′14″N 123°49′18″E
DXAU	26	Pagadian	7°50′25″N 123°22′55″E
DXAW	27	Surigao City	9°48′16″N 125°27′11″E
DXRA	27	Davao City	7°4′24″N 125°34′33″E
DXMP	26	General Santos	6°8′19″N 125°10′45″E
DXVB	21	Zamboanga City	6°56′59″N 122°3′23″E
DXMB	27	Cotabato City	7°12′40″N 124°15′1″E
DXGP	26	Jolo, Sulu	6°2′59″N 120°59′58″E

== See also ==
- GMA Network (DZBB-TV)
- DWDB-TV
- DZBB-AM
- DWLS-FM
- Dobol B TV
- GMA News
