= Primetime Emmy Award for Outstanding Technical Direction and Camerawork for a Series =

Television award category

Primetime Emmy Award for Technical Direction and Camerawork for a Series
- Awarded for: Outstanding Technical Direction and Camerawork for a Series
- Country: United States
- Presented by: Academy of Television Arts & Sciences
- Currently held by: The Late Show with Stephen Colbert (2026)
- Website: emmys.com

The Primetime Emmy Award for Outstanding Technical Direction and Camerawork for a Series is awarded to one television series each year. Prior to 1983, regular series competed alongside limited series, movies and specials for Outstanding Achievement in Technical Direction and Electronic Camerawork. Nominations were dominated by specials, leading to the creation of separate awards.

In the following list, the first titles listed in gold are the winners; those not in gold are nominees, which are listed in alphabetical order. The years given are those in which the ceremonies took place.

== Winners and nominations ==
indicates the winner

Outstanding Technical Direction and Electronic Camerawork

=== 1970s ===
Year	Program	Episode	Nominees	Network
1970 (22nd)
1970 (22nd)	Kraft Music Hall	"The Sound of Burt Bacharach"	Al Camoin, Gene Martin, Donald Mulvaney, Heino Ripp, Cal Shadwell, Fred Ottaviano	NBC
1970 (22nd)	An Evening with Julie Andrews and Harry Belafonte		Roy Holm, Robert Keyes, Wayne Osterhout, Gene Schwarz, Ronald Sheldon, O. Tamburri, Kurt Tonnessen	NBC
1970 (22nd)	A Storm in Summer		Nick DeMos, Robert Fonarow, Charles Franklin, Ken Lamkin, Ben Wolf	NBC
1971 (23rd)
1971 (23rd)	The Andersonville Trial		Tom Ancell, Gordon Baird, Rick Bennewitz, Larry Bentley, Jack Reader	PBS
1971 (23rd)	Apollo 14: Recovery Aboard the USS New Orleans		Alan Latter, Tom McConnell, Barney Neeley, Bill Schertle	(Note: Apollo 14: Recovery Aboard the USS New Orleans was credited as network pool coverage.)
1971 (23rd)	Rowan & Martin's Laugh-In		Marvin Ault, Ray Figelski, Louis Fusari, Jon Olson, Tony Yarlett	NBC
1972 (24th)
1972 (24th)	Jack Lemmon in 'S Wonderful, 'S Marvelous, 'S Gershwin		Al Camoin, Frank Gaeta, Gene Martin, Donald Mulvaney, Heino Ripp	NBC
1972 (24th)	The Flip Wilson Show		Ray Figelski, Louis Fusari, Rich Lombardo, Jon Olson, Wayne Osterhoudt	NBC
1972 (24th)	Gideon		Bob Keys, Don Mulvaney, Jon Olson, O. Tamburri	NBC
1973 (25th)
1973 (25th)	The Julie Andrews Hour		Jim Angel, James Balden, Ernie Buttleman, Dave Hilmer, Robert A. Kemp	ABC
1973 (25th)	Apollo 17: Splashdown		Sam Drummy, E.G. Johnson	(Note: Apollo 17: Splashdown was credited as pool coverage.)
1973 (25th)	The Sonny & Cher Comedy Hour		Gorman Erickson, Charles Franklin, Jack Jennings, Tom McConnell, Barney Neeley, Richard Nelson	CBS
1974 (26th)
1974 (26th)	In Concert	"Cat Stevens"	James Balden, Ron Brooks, Gerry Bucci, Dave Hilmer, Dave Smith, Kenneth Tamburri	ABC
1974 (26th)	Judgment: The Trial of Julius and Ethel Rosenberg		Lew Adams, Ken Lamkin, John Poliak, Parker Roe, Gary Stanton	ABC
1974 (26th)	Pueblo		Richard Kerr, Morris Mann, Lou Marchand, John Morreale, Michael W. Rebich, Robert Wolff	ABC
1975 (27th)
1975 (27th)	The Missiles of October		Jim Angel, James Balden, Ron Brooks, Ernie Buttelman, Art LaCombe	ABC
1975 (27th)	Clarence Darrow		John James, Bob Keys, Jon Olson, Heino Ripp, Kurt Tonnessen	NBC
1975 (27th)	The Perry Como Christmas Show		Ray Figelski, Lou Fusari, Roy Holm, Bob Keys, Rick Lombardo, Heino Ripp, Tony Yarlett	CBS
1976 (28th)
1976 (28th)	The Adams Chronicles	"John Adams, Diplomat"	Leonard Chumbley, Walter Edel, John Feher, Steve Zink	PBS
1976 (28th)	Mary's Incredible Dream		Lew Adams, Samuel E. Dowlen, Ken Lamkin, John Poliak, Ronald Sheldon	CBS
1976 (28th)	Mitzi and a Hundred Guys		Louis Fusari, Roy Holm, Rick Lombardo, Jon Olson, Ian Taylor	CBS
1976 (28th)	Mitzi... Roarin' in the 20's		Fred Donelson, Bruce Gray, Roy Holm, George Meyer, Jerry Weiss	CBS
1977 (29th)
1977 (29th)	Doug Henning's World of Magic		Jim Dodge, Bruce Gray, John Gutierrez, Wayne McDonald, Karl Messerschmidt, Jon Olson	NBC
1977 (29th)	Harry S. Truman: Plain Speaking		Ken Anderson, Arthur G. Vogel	PBS
1977 (29th)	The Neil Diamond Special		Gene Crowe, Tom Doakes, Samuel E. Dowlen, Larry Heider, Bob Keys, Wayne Orr, Bill Philbin, Ron Sheldon	NBC
1977 (29th)	A Special Olivia Newton-John		James Balden, Ernie Buttelman, Jack Denton, David Hilmer, Mayo Partee	ABC
1977 (29th)	Victory at Entebbe		Lew Adams, Samuel E. Dowlen, Mike Keeler, Ken Lamkin, Gary Stanton	ABC
1978 (30th)
1978 (30th)	The Sentry Collection Presents Ben Vereen: His Roots		Gene Crowe, Larry Heider, Dave Hilmer, Bob Keys, Wayne Orr	ABC
1978 (30th)	CBS: On the Air		John J. Aguirre, Thomas Brown, Brian Cunneen, Steve Cunningham, Gorman Erickson, David Finch, Charles Franklin, Mark Miller, Richard Nelson, Hector Ramirez, Louis Shore, Gordon T. Sweeney, Harry Tatarian, Robert Welsh, Ben Wolf, Stanley Zitnick	CBS
1978 (30th)	Doug Henning's World of Magic		Jim Dodge, George Falardeau, Mike Higuera, George Loomis, Karl Messerschmidt, Jon Olson, Mike Stramisky	NBC
1978 (30th)	Mitzi... What's Hot, What's Not		Louis Fusari, Rodger Harbaugh, Roy Holm, Rick Lombardo, Peggy Mahoney	CBS
1978 (30th)	Our Town		Roy Holm, Reed Howard, Jon Olson, O. Tamburri	NBC
1979 (31st)
1979 (31st)	Dick Clark's Live Wednesday	"101"	Don Barker, Louis Cywinski, Reed Howard, William Landers, George Loomis, Peggy Mahoney, Brian Sherriffe, Kurt Tonnessen, Jerry Weiss	NBC
1979 (31st)	The Midnight Special	"Dolly Parton"	Bruce Bottone, Jim Herring, Royden Holm, Robert G. Holmes, Bill Landers, Peggy Mahoney	NBC
1979 (31st)	Saturday Night Live	"Host: Richard Benjamin"	Peter Basil, Al Camoin, Tom De Zendorf, Vince Di Pietro, John Pinto, Heino Ripp	NBC
1979 (31st)	You Can't Take It with You		Dianne Biederbeck, Barry A. Brown, Hank Geving, Larry Heider, Robert C. Jones, Tom Karnowski, Dave Levisohn, Wayne Orr, Richard Price	CBS

=== 1980s ===
Year	Program	Episode	Nominees	Network
1980 (32nd)
1980 (32nd)	The Oldest Living Graduate		Tom Geren, Dean Hall, Bob Highton, William Landers, Wayne Parsons, Ron Sheldon	NBC
1980 (32nd)	A Christmas Special... with Love, Mac Davis		Larry Heider, Roy Holm, William Landers, Peggy Mahoney, Wayne Orr, Mike Stramisky, Jerry Weiss	NBC
1980 (32nd)	Goldie and Liza Together		Ralph Alcocer, Jim Angel, Dave Banks, Ron Brooks, Warren Cress, Jack Denton, Bud Holland, Robert A. Kemp, Art LaCombe, Dan Langford, Wayne Orr, Ken Tamburri	CBS
1980 (32nd)	The Magic of David Copperfield II		Les Atkinson, Roy Holm, Peggy Mahoney, Mike Stramisky, Jerry Weiss	CBS
1980 (32nd)	The Midnight Special	"The Cars"	Bruce Bottone, George Falardeau, Robert G. Holmes, William Landers, Peggy Mahoney, Mike Stramisky	NBC
1981 (33rd)
1981 (33rd)	Live from Studio 8H: An Evening of Jerome Robbins		Peter Basil, Al Camoin, Tom Dezendorf, Vince Di Pietro, Gene Martin, Heino Ripp	NBC
1981 (33rd)	The Magic of David Copperfield III: Levitating Ferrari		Don Barker, Bruce Bottone, Jim Herring, Royden Holm, Jerry Weiss	CBS
1981 (33rd)	Kenny Rogers' America		Rick Caswell, Rocky Danielson, Bob Eberline, John B. Field, Hank Geving, Dean Hall, Larry Heider, Bob Heighton, Dave Hilmer, Dave Levisohn, Dan Preston, Larry Travis, Wayne Womack	CBS
1981 (33rd)	The People vs. Jean Harris		George Falardeau, Royden Holm, Reed Howard, O. Tamburri	NBC
1981 (33rd)	Tomorrow Coast to Coast	"Charles Manson Interview"	George Ciliberto, Barry Frisher, Jodi Greenberg, George Loomis, Tom Sabol, Pamela Schneider, Mike Stramisky, O. Tamburri	NBC
1982 (34th)
1982 (34th)	The Magic of David Copperfield IV: The Vanishing Airplane		Bruce Bottone, Ken Dahlquist, Dean Hall, James Herring, Royden Holm, Tom Munshower, Wayne Nostaja, David Nowell, Jerry Weiss	CBS
1982 (34th)	Ain't Misbehavin'		Don Barker, George Falardeau, Mike Higuera, Royden Holm, Reed Howard, O. Tamburri	NBC
1982 (34th)	All the Way Home		Les Atkinson, George Falardeau, James Herring, Mike Higuera, Royden Holm, Karl Messerschmidt, Mike Stramisky	NBC
1982 (34th)	Lynda Carter: Street Life		Ron Brooks, Gerry Bucci, Warren Cress, D.J. Diomedes, Don Langford, Jay Lowry, Bill Scott	CBS
1982 (34th)	Rod Stewart: Tonight He's Yours		Rocky Danielson, Terry Donohue, Joe Epperson, John Gillis, Dean Hall, Don Jones, Mike Keeler, Bruce Oldham, Kenneth Patterson, John Repczynski, Kenneth Tamburri	Syndicated

Outstanding Technical Direction, Camerawork, Video Control for a Series

Year	Program	Episode	Nominees	Network
1983 (35th)
1983 (35th)	Saturday Night Live	"Host: Sid Caesar"	Michael Bennett, Al Camoin, Jan Kasoff, John Pinto, Heino Ripp, Maurey Verschoore	NBC
1983 (35th)	Benson	"The Honeymooners"	Herm Falk, William Pope, Donna Quante, John Rago, Iris Rosenthal	ABC
1983 (35th)	It Takes Two	"An Affair to Remember"	Gerry Bucci, D.J. Diomedes, Art LaCombe, Carol Wetovich, Blair White	ABC
1983 (35th)	Sound Festival	"Flora Purim and Airto Moreira"	Luis Fuerte, Larry Heider, Robert Keyes, Wayne Orr, Ken Patterson, Cal Slater	PBS
1984 (36th)
1984 (36th)	On Stage America	"5"	Gene Crowe, Sam Drummy, Larry Heider, Dave Levisohn, Wayne Orr, Mark Sanford, Ron Sheldon	Syndicated
1984 (36th)	Benson	"The Governor's Brain Is Missing"	Victor Bagdadi, Ron Brooks, Herm Falk, Steve Jones, Bill Pope, Donna Quante	ABC
1984 (36th)	Jennifer Slept Here	"Life with Grandfather"	Les Atkinson, Mike Higuera, Roy Holm, Arnold Shapiro, O. Tamburri, Kurt Tonnessen	NBC
1984 (36th)	Oh Madeline	"Book of Love"	Gerry Bucci, Ross Harmon, Steve Jones, Art LaCombe, Donna Quante, Iris Rosenthal, Carol Wetovich	ABC
1984 (36th)	Solid Gold	"98"	Gene Crowe, Sam Drummy, Larry Heider, Dave Levisohn, Wayne Orr, Mark Sanford, Ron Sheldon	Syndicated
1985 (37th)
1985 (37th)	Benson	"Home for Christmas"	Randy Baer, Victor Bagdadi, Herm Falk, Stephen A. Jones, Bill McCloud, Donna Quante	ABC
1985 (37th)	The Cosby Show	"Presentation"	Charles Barrett, Michael Bennett, Gerry Bucci, D.J. Diomedes, Jack Durkin, Steve Jones, Art LaCombe, Jim Marshall, Jim Mott, Brian Phraner, Donna Quante, Alonzo Roberts	NBC
1985 (37th)	Punky Brewster	"Henry Falls in Love"	Les Atkinson, Roy Holm, Reed Howard, Arnie Shapiro, O. Tamburri, Kurt Tonnessen	NBC
1985 (37th)	Sara	"Rock 'N Roll Father"	Les Atkinson, Roy Holm, Reed Howard, Kurt Tonnessen, Bob Vinson, Jerry Weiss	NBC
1986 (38th)
1986 (38th)	The Golden Girls	"Pilot"	Randy Baer, Victor Bagdadi, Gerry Bucci, Dale Carlson, Steve Jones, Donna Quante	NBC
1986 (38th)	The Facts of Life	"Come Back to the Truck Stop, Natalie Green, Natalie Green"	Ron Brooks, D.J. Diomedes, Ross Harmon, Bud Holland, Noel Newman, Donna Quante	NBC
1986 (38th)	The Motown Revue Starring Smokey Robinson	"The Mary Jane Girls, Weird Al Yankovic, Mary Wells and Diana Ross"	Les Atkinson, Don Barker, Bruce Bottone, Wayne Getchell, Robert G. Holmes, Jay O'Neill, Jerry Smith, Mike Stramisky	NBC
1986 (38th)	The Motown Revue Starring Smokey Robinson	"Pilot"	Les Atkinson, Don Barker, Bruce Bottone, Jim Herring, Mike Higuera, Robert G. Holmes, Jay O'Neill, Arnie Shapiro, Mike Stramisky	NBC
1986 (38th)	Who's the Boss?	"Hunk of the Month"	Randy Baer, Gerry Bucci, Dale Carlson, Art LaCombe, Jan Lowry, John O'Brien	ABC
1987 (39th)
1987 (39th)	Family Ties	"A, My Name Is Alex"	Paul Basta, Eric Clay, Tom Dasbach, Richard Price, John Repczynski, Parker Roe	NBC
1987 (39th)	The Charmings	"The Incredible Shrinking Prince"	Warren Cress, Ross Harmon, Charles T. Henry, Bud Holland, Stephen A. Jones, Art LaCombe, Bill Scott, David Smith	ABC
1987 (39th)	The Golden Girls	"Forgive Me, Father"	Jack Chisholm, Bob Kaufman, Ritch Kenney, O. Tamburri, Kenneth Tamburri, Carol Wetovich	NBC
1987 (39th)	Night Court	"Murder"	Rocky Danielson, Leigh V. Nicholson, John Repczynski, Tom Tcimpidis, Jerry Weiss, Jeffrey Wheat	NBC
1988 (40th)
1988 (40th)	The Golden Girls	"Old Friends"	Jack Chisholm, Stephen A. Jones, Robert G. Kaufmann, Ritch Kenney, O. Tamburri, Kenneth Tamburri	NBC
1988 (40th)	The Charmings	"Trading Places"	Warren Cress, Ross Harmon, Charles T. Henry, David Smith, Joe Talosi, Harriet Uhl, Dale Walsh	ABC
1988 (40th)	Dolly	"A Down Home Country Christmas"	Ralph Alcocer, Ron Brooks, D.J. Diomedes, Sal Folino, Vaughn Gaddey, Chuck Pharis, Dale Walsh	ABC
1988 (40th)	Win, Lose or Draw	"1183"	Van Carlson, James Earl Jackson, Rick Labgold, Tracy Lawrence, Jean Mason, Dave Navarrette, Dale Orlich, Jim Rush	Syndicated
1989 (41st)
1989 (41st)	Night Court	"Yet Another Day in the Life"	Rocky Danielson, Robert G. Holmes, Leigh V. Nicholson, John Repczynski, Thomas G. Tcimpidis, Jeffrey Wheat	NBC
1989 (41st)	The Arsenio Hall Show	"Boy George, Mary Frann and Bruce Boxleitner"	Steven C. Berry, Greg Cook, Ken Dahlquist, Tom Geren, Bob Highton, Clay Jacobsen	Syndicated
1989 (41st)	Family Ties	"Alex Doesn't Live Here Anymore"	Paul Basta, Rick Caswell, Eric Clay, Hank Geving, Richard Price, Parker Roe	NBC
1989 (41st)	The Golden Girls	"Brother, Can You Spare That Jacket?"	Chester Jackson, Stephen A. Jones, Ritch Kenney, John O'Brien, O. Tamburri, Kenneth Tamburri	NBC
1989 (41st)	Who's the Boss?	"A Spirited Christmas"	Dale Carlson, Herm Falk, Len Grice, Keith Lisle, Robert Martin, Blair White	ABC
1989 (41st)	Win, Lose or Draw	"Disney World Remote"	Bob Blair, Van Carlson, Ross Elliott, Tom Geren, Mike Hernandez, James Earl Jackson, Rick Labgold, Tracy Lawrence, David Navarrette, Jim Rush	Syndicated

=== 1990s ===
Year	Program	Episode	Nominees	Network
1990 (42nd)
1990 (42nd)	Saturday Night Live	"Host: Christopher Walken"	Joe Debonis, Steve Jambeck, Jan Kasoff, John Pinto, Robert Reese, Terry Rohnke, Bruce Shapiro	NBC
1990 (42nd)	A Different World	"For Whom the Jingle Bell Tolls"	Steve Casaly, Bobby DaSilva, Karl Messerschmidt, Dave Owen, Dana Ross Martin, Greg Smith	NBC
1990 (42nd)	Entertainment Tonight	"2128"	Greg Cook, Vince Longo, John Milek, Wayne Parsons, Tom Weber	Syndicated
1990 (42nd)	The Golden Girls	"Love Under the Big Top"	Dave Heckman, Chester Jackson, Randy Johnson, Stephen A. Jones, Ritch Kenney, O. Tamburri	NBC
1990 (42nd)	Night Court	"Come Back to the Five and Dime Stephen King, Stephen King"	Rick Caswell, Rocky Danielson, Robert G. Holmes, Leigh V. Nicholson, Thomas G. Tcimpidis, Jeffrey Wheat	NBC
1990 (42nd)	The Tonight Show Starring Johnny Carson		Don Barker, Bruce Bottone, Ray Figelski, Hal Ingels, Brooke McKusick	NBC
1991 (43rd)
1991 (43rd)	Married People	"Dance Ten, Friends Zero"	Marty Brown, Dave Owen, Rich Rose, Marvin Shearer, Mark Warshaw, Jerry Weiss	ABC
1991 (43rd)	Empty Nest	"The Last Temptation of Laverne"	Jack Chisholm, David Heckman, Stephen A. Jones, Ritch Kenney, John O'Brien, Kenneth Tamburri	NBC
1991 (43rd)	The Golden Girls	"What a Difference a Date Makes"	David Heckman, Chester Jackson, Randy Johnson, Stephen A. Jones, Ritch Kenney, Kenneth Tamburri	NBC
1991 (43rd)	Into the Night with Rick Dees	"Dance Ten, Friends Zero"	Guy Casagrande, Bob Crump, Charles T. Henry, Art LaCombe, Chuck Pharis, Harriet Uhl	ABC
1991 (43rd)	The Tonight Show Starring Johnny Carson	"Dolly Parton and Mark Schif"	Donald Barker, Debra Brawner, Ray Figelski, Harold C. Ingels, Brooke McKusick, Kurt Tonnessen	NBC
1992 (44th)
1992 (44th)	The Golden Girls	"One Flew Out of the Cuckoo's Nest"	Dave Heckman, Chester Jackson, Randy Johnson, Stephen A. Jones, Ritch Kenney, Bob Keys, John O'Brien, Richard Steiner, Kenneth Tamburri	NBC
1992 (44th)	Night Court	"A Guy Named Phantom, Part 2"	Robert Bonas, Rick Caswell, Rocky Danielson, Robert G. Holmes, Tom Tcimpidis, Jeffrey Wheat	NBC
1992 (44th)	The Tonight Show Starring Johnny Carson		Donald Barker, Bruce Bottone, Ray Figelski, Harold C. Ingels, Kurt Tonnessen	NBC
1992 (44th)	The Tonight Show with Jay Leno		Ted Ashton, Les Atkinson, Don Barker, Harold C. Ingels, Mike Stramisky, Kurt Tonnessen	NBC
1993 (45th)
1993 (45th)	The Arsenio Hall Show	"The 1,000th Show"	Steven C. Berry, Rick Edwards, John Gillis, Larry Heider, Robert L. Highton, Dave Hilmer, Michael Malone, Bruce Oldham, Kenneth Patterson, David Plakos, Allan Wells	Syndicated
1993 (45th)	Home Improvement	"Rites and Wrongs of Passage"	Gary Allen, Randy Baer, Chris Donovan, Larry Gaudette, Greg Harms, Bob Kaufman, Marvin Shearer	ABC
1993 (45th)	MTV Unplugged	"k.d. lang"	Juan Barrera, Bob Conover, Manny Gutierrez, Charlie Huntley, Emmett Loughran, Manny Rodriguez, Billy Steinberg, Mark Whitman, Steve Yaconetti	MTV
1993 (45th)	Roc	"Roc Works for Joey"	Robert L. Highton, David Hilmer, Dave Levisohn, Kenneth Patterson, Mark Sanford, Kenneth Shapiro, Vince Singletary	Fox
1993 (45th)	The Tonight Show with Jay Leno	"273"	Ted Ashton, Les Atkinson, Don Barker, Hal Ingels, Mike Stramisky, Kurt Tonnessen	NBC
1994 (46th)
1994 (46th)	Saturday Night Live	"Hosts: Alec Baldwin & Kim Basinger"	Michael Bennett, Steven Cimino, Carl Eckett, Jan Kasoff, John Pinto, Robert Reese, William Vaccaro	NBC
1994 (46th)	Empty Nest	"Das Boob"	Dave Heckman, Chester Jackson, Stephen A. Jones, Ritch Kenney, John O'Brien, Kenneth Tamburri	NBC
1994 (46th)	Home Improvement	"Fifth Anniversary"	Gary Allen, Randy Baer, Chris Donovan, Larry Gaudette, Victor Gonzalez, Bob Kaufman, Marvin Shearer	ABC
1994 (46th)	Late Show with David Letterman	"158"	Alan Cialino, Joe DeBonis, David Dorsett, Jerry Foley, Angel Herrera, John Pumo, Jack Young	CBS
1994 (46th)	The Tonight Show with Jay Leno	"273"	Les Atkinson, Don Barker, Hank Geving, Brian Jorgensen, Michael Stramisky, Kurt Tonnessen	NBC
1995 (47th)
1995 (47th)	Saturday Night Live		Gregory Aull, Michael Bennett, Steven Cimino, Carl Eckett, Jan Kasoff, John Pinto, Robert Reese, William Vaccaro	NBC
1995 (47th)	Entertainment Tonight	"3391"	Greg Chastan, Greg Cook, Rex Hosea, Scott Lee, Vince Longo, Michael Marson, John Milek, Wayne Parsons, Steve Yaconetti	Syndicated
1995 (47th)	Home Improvement	"Tool Time After Dark"	Gary Allen, Randy Baer, Chris Donovan, Richard Edwards, Larry Gaudette, Victor Gonzalez, Bob Kaufman, Kenneth Shapiro, Marvin Shearer, Craig Shideler	ABC
1995 (47th)	The John Larroquette Show	"In the Pink"	Neal Carlos, William C. Irwin, Stephen A. Jones, Ritch Kenney, Corey Kimball, John O'Brien	NBC
1995 (47th)	Late Show with David Letterman	"340"	Al Cialino, Joe DeBonis, David Dorsett, Jerry Foley, Angel Herrera, John Pumo, Jack Young	CBS
1995 (47th)	The Tonight Show with Jay Leno	"541"	Les Atkinson, Dave Banks, Don Barker, William Gardhouse II, Hank Geving, Rob Palmer, Michael Stramisky, Kurt Tonnessen	NBC
1996 (48th)
1996 (48th)	The Tonight Show with Jay Leno	"914"	Les Atkinson, Lance Gardhouse, William Gardhouse II, Hank Geving, Dave Levisohn, Wayne Orr, Rob Palmer, John Slagle, Michael Stramisky, Kurt Tonnessen	NBC
1996 (48th)	Home Improvement	"The Longest Day"	Gary Allen, Larry Gaudette, Victor Gonzalez, Bob Kaufman, Marvin Shearer, Craig Shideler	ABC
1996 (48th)	The John Larroquette Show	"Here We Go Again"	Neal Carlos, William C. Irwin, Stephen A. Jones, Ritch Kenney, Corey Kimball, John O'Brien	NBC
1996 (48th)	Muppets Tonight	"Cindy Crawford"	Ted Ashton, Tom Conkright, Rockworth Danielson, Randy Gomez, Mark Hunter, John Palacio, Kenneth Tamburri	ABC
1996 (48th)	Saturday Night Live	"Host: Christopher Walken"	Gregory Aull, Michael Bennett, Steven Cimino, Carl Eckett, Frank Grisanti, Jan Kasoff, John Pinto, Robert Reese	NBC
1997 (49th)
1997 (49th)	The Tonight Show with Jay Leno	"1079"	Les Atkinson, Kevin Fraser, William Gardhouse II, Hank Geving, Rob Palmer, Michael Stramisky, Kurt Tonnessen	NBC
1997 (49th)	Cosby	"Pilot"	Theodore Ashton, Neal Carlos, Thomas Conkright, Stephen A. Jones, Ritch Kenney, Karl Messerschmidt, J. A. Stuewe Prudden	CBS
1997 (49th)	Muppets Tonight	"Sandra Bullock"	Diane Biederbeck, Thomas Conkright, Tom Geren, Randy Gomez, Ray Gonzales, John Palacio, Brian Reason, Kenneth Tamburri	ABC
1997 (49th)	Saturday Night Live	"Host: Dana Carvey"	Gregory Aull, Michael Bennett, Steven Cimino, Carl Eckett, Frank Grisanti, Jan Kasoff, John Pinto, Robert Reese	NBC
1998 (50th)
1998 (50th)	ER	"Ambush"	Dave Chameides, Gene Crowe, Hank Geving, Larry Heider, Robert L. Highton, Don Lenzer, John O'Brien, Bill Philbin, Chuck Reilly	NBC
1998 (50th)	Dennis Miller Live		John J. Aguirre, Joel D. Binger, Terry Clark, Edward Nelson, Les Nourse, Richard Portanova, Donna Stock, Martin K. Wagner	HBO
1998 (50th)	Home Improvement	"A Night to Dismember"	Gary Allen, Jeff Barnes, Larry Gaudette, Bob Kaufman, Bettina Levesque, Marvin Shearer, Craig Shideler	ABC
1998 (50th)	Politically Incorrect with Bill Maher		Terry Clark, Sandra Harris, Paul Johnson, Rick Labgold, Thomas Luth, Jacqueline Moore, Edward Nelson, Michael J. Schwartz, Donna Stock, Jim Velarde	ABC
1998 (50th)	Saturday Night Live	"Host: Nathan Lane"	Barry Frischer, Gregory Aull, Michael Bennett, Steven Cimino, Carl Eckett, Frank Grisanti, Jan Kasoff, John Pinto	NBC
1998 (50th)	The Tonight Show with Jay Leno	"Arsenio Hall, Siskel & Ebert, Leno Look-A-Likes, Blue Man Group"	Les Atkinson, Dave Banks, Kevin Fraser, Lance Gardhouse, William Gardhouse II, Hank Geving, Dave Levisohn, Rob Palmer, Michael Stramisky, Kurt Tonnessen	NBC
1999 (51st)
1999 (51st)	The Tonight Show with Jay Leno	"1613"	Kevin Fraser, William Gardhouse II, Larry Heider, Hugo Morelli, Rob Palmer, Brian Reason, Michael Stramisky, Kurt Tonnessen	NBC
1999 (51st)	Home Improvement	"The Long and Winding Road, Part 3"	Gary Allen, Jeff Barnes, Larry Gaudette, Bob Kaufman, Bettina Levesque, Marvin Shearer, Craig Shideler	ABC
1999 (51st)	Politically Incorrect with Bill Maher		Terry W. Clark, Paul Johnson, Rick Labgold, Thomas Luth, Ed Nelson, Michael J. Schwartz, Donna Stock, Jim Velarde	ABC
1999 (51st)	Saturday Night Live	"Host: Ben Stiller"	Barry Frischer, Michael Bennett, Steven Cimino, Carl Eckett, Rick Fox, Frank Grisanti, Jan Kasoff, Susan Noll, Brian Phraner, John Pinto, Michael Ruiz	NBC

=== 2000s ===
Year	Program	Episode	Nominees	Network
2000 (52nd)
2000 (52nd)	Politically Incorrect with Bill Maher	"Sp-05"	Terry W. Clark, Richard W. Davis, Paul Johnson, Rick Labgold, Thomas Luth, Michael J. Schwartz, Donna Stock, Jim Velarde	ABC
2000 (52nd)	Saturday Night Live	"Host: Christopher Walken"	Michael Bennett, Steven Cimino, Carl Eckett, Richard B. Fox, Frank Grisanti, Jan Kasoff, Susan Noll, John Pinto	NBC
2000 (52nd)	The Tonight Show with Jay Leno	"1785"	Les Atkinson, Dave Banks, Kevin Fraser, William Gardhouse II, Hugo Morelli, Rob Palmer, John Slagle, Michael Stramisky, Kurt Tonnessen	NBC
2001 (53rd)
2001 (53rd)	Late Show with David Letterman	"1527"	Al Cialino, John Curtin, David Dorsett, Dan Flaherty, Karin-Lucie Grzella, John Hannel, Timothy Kennedy, Jim Masi, George Rothweiler, Fred Shimizu, Joel Solofsky, Bill White, Jack Young	CBS
2001 (53rd)	Saturday Night Live	"Host: Christopher Walken"	Michael Bennett, Steven Cimino, Carl Eckett, Richard B. Fox, Frank Grisanti, Susan Noll, Brian Phraner, John Pinto	NBC
2001 (53rd)	The Tonight Show with Jay Leno	"2057"	Ted Ashton, Les Atkinson, Ann Bergstrom, Kevin Fraser, William Gardhouse II, Tom Geren, Dave Levisohn, Hugo Morelli, Michael Stramisky, Kurt Tonnessen, Michael Tribble	NBC
2001 (53rd)	Whose Line Is It Anyway?	"313"	Ted Ashton, Sam Drummy, Larry Heider, Bob Keys, John O'Brien, John Pritchett, Brian Reason, Easter Xua, Brad Zerbst	ABC
2002 (54th)
2002 (54th)	Saturday Night Live	"Host: Britney Spears"	Michael Bennett, Steven Cimino, Carl Eckett, Richard B. Fox, Frank Grisanti, Jan Kasoff, Susan Noll, John Pinto	NBC
2002 (54th)	Late Show with David Letterman	"1668"	Kevin Bailey, Daniel Campbell, Al Cialino, John Curtin, David Dorsett, Dan Flaherty, Karin-Lucie Grzella, John Hannel, Steve Kaufman, Timothy Kennedy, Jim Masi, JR Nader, Mark Ogden, George Rothweiler, William Scammon, Fred Shimizu, Claus Stuhlweissenburg, Bill White, Jack Young	CBS
2002 (54th)	Survivor	"Finale and Reunion"	Greg Acosta, Jesse Acosta, Joseph R. Bohman, Terry Wayne Clark, Rocky Danielson, Suzanne E. Ebner, David Hallmark, Rodger Harbaugh, Timothy J. Heinzel, Scha Jani, Les Nourse, Gordon T. Sweeney, Tom Tcimpidis, Joseph Vicens, Brad Zerbst	CBS
2002 (54th)	The Tonight Show with Jay Leno	"2230"	Les Atkinson, Kevin Fraser, William Gardhouse II, Tom Green, Larry Heider, Hugo Morelli, Brian Reason, John Slagle, Michael Stramisky, Kurt Tonnessen	NBC
2003 (55th)
2003 (55th)	Saturday Night Live	"Host: Christopher Walken"	Michael Bennett, Steven Cimino, Richard B. Fox, Frank Grisanti, Jimmy Mott, Susan Noll, Brian Phraner, John Pinto	NBC
2003 (55th)	American Idol	"210"	Diane Biederbeck, Danny Bonilla, Manny Bonilla, David Eastwood, Bobby Highton, Ed Horton, Steve Martyniuk, Kenny Patterson, John Pritchett, John Repczynski, Mark Sanford	Fox
2003 (55th)	Late Show with David Letterman	"1912"	Daniel Campbell, Michael Carlucci, Al Cialino, John Curtin, David Dorsett, Dan Flaherty, Karin-Lucie Grzella, John Hannel, Steve Kaufman, Timothy Kennedy, Jim Masi, Mark Ogden, George Rothweiler, William Scammon, Fred Shimizu, Joel Solofsky, Claus Stuhlweissenburg, William White, Jack Young	CBS
2003 (55th)	The Tonight Show with Jay Leno	"2279"	Les Atkinson, Kevin Fraser, William Gardhouse II, Henry Geving, Dave Levisohn, Rob Palmer, Brian Reason, John Slagle, Michael Stramisky, Kurt Tonnessen	NBC
2004 (56th)
2004 (56th)	Saturday Night Live	"Host: Janet Jackson"	Michael Bennett, Steven Cimino, Eric A. Eisenstein, Richard B. Fox, Frank Grisanti, Susan Noll, Brian Phraner, John Pinto	NBC
2004 (56th)	American Idol	"318"	"Scoop" Geren, Bobby Highton, Ed Horton, George Prince, John Pritchett, John Repczynski, Wade Samul, Mark Sanford, Danny Webb	Fox
2004 (56th)	Late Night with Conan O'Brien	"1855"	Gregory Aull, Richard S. Carter, Kenneth Decker, Kurt Decker, Carl M. Henry III, Eugene Huelsman, Wojtek Kozlowski, Chris Matott, James Palczewski, Brian Tyson, Keith Winikoff	NBC
2004 (56th)	Late Show with David Letterman	"2048"	Kevin Bailey, Dan Campbell, Al Cialino, John Curtin, Joe DeBonis, David Dorsett, Dan Flaherty, Karin-Lucie Grzella, John Hannel, Steve Kaufman, Timothy Kennedy, Dean Meierfeld, George Rothweiler, Fred Shimizu, Claus Stuhlweissenburg, William White, Jack Young	CBS
2004 (56th)	The Tonight Show with Jay Leno	"2625"	"Scoop" Geren, Hank Geving, Rob Palmer, Michael Stramisky, Kurt Tonnessen	NBC
2005 (57th)
2005 (57th)	Late Show with David Letterman	"2269"	Daniel Campbell, Al Cialino, John Curtin, Joe DeBonis, David Dorsett, Dan Flaherty, Karin-Lucie Grzella, John Hannel, Steven Kaufman, Timothy Kennedy, John Pry, George Rothweiler, Fred Shimizu, Claus Stuhlweissenburg, William J. White, Jack Young	CBS
2005 (57th)	Late Night with Conan O'Brien	"2014"	Gregory Aull, Richard S. Carter, Kenneth Decker, Kurt Decker, Carl M. Henry III, Eugene Huelsman, Chris Matott, James Palczewski	NBC
2005 (57th)	Saturday Night Live	"Host: Jason Bateman"	Michael Bennett, Steven Cimino, Eric A. Eisenstein, Richard B. Fox, Frank Grisanti, Susan Noll, Brian Phraner, John Pinto	NBC
2006 (58th)
2006 (58th)	Dancing with the Stars	"204"	Diane Biederbeck, Danny Bonilla, Suzanne Ebner, Chris Gray, James Karidas, Dave Levisohn, John Pritchett, Hector Ramirez, Brian Reason, John Repczynski, Easter Xua	ABC
2006 (58th)	American Idol	"530"	Diane Biederbeck, Danny Bonilla, Manny Bonilla, Dave Eastwood, Suzanne Ebner, Bobby Highton, Ed Horton, Steve Martynuik, Ken Patterson, George Prince, John Pritchett, John Repczynski, Mark Sanford, Easter Xua	Fox
2006 (58th)	Late Night with Conan O'Brien	"2226"	Gregory Aull, Richard S. Carter, Eli Clarke, Kenneth Decker, Kurt Decker, Carl M. Henry III, Gene Huelsman, Gregory Kasoff, Chris Matott, James Palczewski, James Scurti, Mark Sofil, Keith Winikoff	NBC
2006 (58th)	Late Show with David Letterman	"2472"	Kevin Bailey, Daniel Campbell, Al Cialino, John Curtin, David Dorsett, Dan Flaherty, Karin-Lucie Grzella, John Hannel, Steven Kaufman, Timothy W. Kennedy, John Pry, George Rothweiler, Fred Shimizu, William J. White, Jack Young	CBS
2006 (58th)	Saturday Night Live	"Host: Jack Black"	Michael Bennett, Steven Cimino, Eric A. Eisenstein, Richard B. Fox, Frank Grisanti, Gene Huelsman, Susan Noll, Brian Phraner, John Pinto, John Rosenblatt	NBC
2007 (59th)
2007 (59th)	Saturday Night Live	"Host: Alec Baldwin"	Barry Frischer, Steven Cimino, John Pinto, Richard B. Fox, Brian Phraner, Eric A. Eisenstein, Susan Noll, Frank Grisanti	NBC
2007 (59th)	American Idol	"Bon Jovi"	John Pritchett, Manny Bonilla, Bert Atkinson, John Repczynski, George Prince, Danny Bonilla, Alex Hernandez, Dave Eastwood, Bobby Highton, Ken Dahlquist, Bill Chaikowsky, Damien Tuffereau, Danny Webb, Ed Horton, Allen Merriweather, Mark Sanford	Fox
2007 (59th)	Dancing with the Stars	"310"	Charles Ciup, Diane Biederbeck, Danny Bonilla, Dave Hilmer, James Karidas, Dave Levisohn, Hector Ramirez, Brian Reason, John Repczynski, Damien Tuffereau, Easter Xua, Chuck Reilly	ABC
2007 (59th)	Jimmy Kimmel Live!	"Jay Z Show"	Ervin D. Hurd, Parker Bartlett, Randy Gomez, Jr., Greg Grouwinkel, Mark Gonzalez, Garrett Hurt, Ritch Kenney, Kris Wilson, Mike Malone, Marc Hunter, Guy Jones	ABC
2007 (59th)	Late Night with Conan O'Brien	"2424"	Gregory Aull, Richard S. Carter, Patrick Casey, Kurt Decker, Eugene Huelsman, Chris Matott, James Palczewski, Gregory Kasoff, Carl M. Henry III	NBC
2008 (60th)
2008 (60th)	Dancing with the Stars	"502A"	Charles Ciup, Brian Reason, Hector Ramirez, James Karidas, Dave Levisohn, Larry Heider, Bettina Levesque, Dave Hilmer, Damien Tuffereau, Easter Xua, Mike Malone, Chuck Reilly	ABC
2008 (60th)	Jimmy Kimmel Live!	"After the Academy Awards"	Ervin D. Hurd, Parker Bartlett, Randy Gomez, Jr., Greg Grouwinkel, Garrett Hurt, Ritch Kenney, Kris Wilson, Gary Taillon, Chris Gray	ABC
2008 (60th)	Late Night with Conan O'Brien	"2585"	Gregory Aull, Richard S. Carter, Patrick Casey, Kurt Decker, Eugene Huelsman, Chris Matott, James Palczewski, Vincent Demaio, James Mott, Edward Wallace, James Corgan, Carl M. Henry III	NBC
2008 (60th)	Late Show with David Letterman	"2827"	Timothy W. Kennedy, Karin-Lucie Grzella, David Dorsett, Jack Young, Al Cialino, John Curtin, Fred Shimizu, Daniel Campbell, John Hannel, Dan Flaherty, George Rothweiler, Steven Kaufman, William J. White	CBS
2009 (61st)
2009 (61st)	American Idol	"834A"	Shiran Stotland, Rick Edwards, Bill Chaikowsky, Greg Smith, John Repczynski, George Prince, Danny Bonilla, Alex Hernandez, Dave Eastwood, Bobby Highton, Ken Patterson, Ken Dahlquist, Diane Biederbeck, Danny Webb, David Plakos, Steve Thiel, Mike Tribble, Chris Gray	Fox
2009 (61st)	Dancing with the Stars	"802A"	Charles Ciup, Brian Reason, Hector Ramirez, Larry Heider, Dave Levisohn, Bert Atkinson, Bettina Levesque, Mike Malone, Adam Margolis, Damien Tuffereau, Easter Xua, Chuck Reilly, Mike Snedden	ABC
2009 (61st)	Jimmy Kimmel Live!	"09-1182"	Ervin D. Hurd, Parker Bartlett, Randy Gomez, Jr., Marc Hunter, Garrett Hurt, Ritch Kenney, Bernd Reinhardt, Kris Wilson, Roy Walker, Guy Jones, Chris Gray	ABC
2009 (61st)	Late Show with David Letterman	"3075"	Timothy W. Kennedy, Karin-Lucie Grzella, David Dorsett, Jack Young, Al Cialino, John Curtin, John Hannel, Dan Flaherty, George Rothweiler, Fred Shimizu, Steven Kaufman, Daniel Campbell, William J. White	CBS
2009 (61st)	Saturday Night Live	"Host: Josh Brolin"	Barry Frischer, Steven Cimino, John Pinto, Paul Cangialosi, Len Wechsler, Eric A. Eisenstein, Susan Noll, Frank Grisanti	NBC

=== 2010s ===
Year	Program	Episode	Nominees	Network
2010 (62nd)
2010 (62nd)	Dancing with the Stars	"909A"	Charles Ciup, Brian Reason, Hector Ramirez, Larry Heider, Dave Levisohn, Bert Atkinson, Bettina Levesque, Adam Margolis, Easter Xua, Damien Tuffereau, Mike Malone, Chuck Reilly	ABC
2010 (62nd)	The Big Bang Theory	"The Adhesive Duck Deficiency"	Brian Wayne Armstrong, John Pierre Dechene, James L. Hitchcock, Richard G. Price, Devin Atwood, John D. O'Brien	CBS
2010 (62nd)	The Daily Show with Jon Stewart	"15032"	Andre Allen, Tom Dowling, Tim Quigley, Phil Salanto, Rich York, Paul Ranieri	Comedy Central
2010 (62nd)	Late Show with David Letterman	"3150"	Timothy W. Kennedy, William J. White, David Dorsett, Jack Young, Karin-Lucie Grzella, Al Cialino, John Curtin, George Rothweiler, Dan Flaherty, Fred Shimizu, Claus Stuhlweissenburg, Joe DeBonis, John Hannel, Steven Kaufman, Daniel Campbell	CBS
2010 (62nd)	Saturday Night Live	"Host: Joseph Gordon-Levitt"	Steven Cimino, Barry Frischer, John Pinto, Paul Cangialosi, Len Wechsler, Eric A. Eisenstein, Susan Noll, Frank Grisanti	NBC
2011 (63rd)
2011 (63rd)	American Idol	"Finale"	Eric Becker, Christine A. Salomon, Robert L. Highton, Dave Eastwood, Suzanne Ebner, John Repczynski, George Prince, Kenneth M. Dahlquist, Edwin Horton, Bill Chaikowsky, John Perry, Danny Bonilla, Diane Biederbeck, Alex Hernandez, Keith Dicker, Danny Webb, Chris Gray	Fox
2011 (63rd)	The Daily Show with Jon Stewart	"15135"	Andre Allen, Tom Dowling, Tim Quigley, Phil Salanto, Rich York, Paul Ranieri	Comedy Central
2011 (63rd)	Dancing with the Stars	"1104A"	Charles Ciup, Brian Reason, Hector Ramirez, Larry Heider, Dave Levisohn, Bert Atkinson, Bettina Levesque, Adam Margolis, Easter Xua, Damien Tuffereau, Mike Malone, Chuck Reilly, Mike Snedden	ABC
2011 (63rd)	Saturday Night Live	"Host: Justin Timberlake"	Steven Cimino, Barry Frischer, John Pinto, Paul Cangialosi, Len Wechsler, Eric A. Eisenstein, Susan Noll, Frank Grisanti	NBC
2011 (63rd)	30 Rock	"Live Show (West Coast)"	Barry Frischer, Steven Cimino, Tim Quigley, Gerard Sava, Marc Bloomgarden, Peter Agliata, Eric A. Eisenstein, John Pinto, James Mott, Frank Grisanti, Susan Noll	NBC
2012 (64th)
2012 (64th)	Saturday Night Live	"Host: Mick Jagger"	Steven Cimino, Barry Frischer, John Pinto, Paul Cangialosi, Len Wechsler, Eric A. Eisenstein, Frank Grisanti, Susan Noll	NBC
2012 (64th)	The Big Bang Theory	"The Countdown Reflection"	Brian Wayne Armstrong, John Pierre Dechene, Ray Gonzales, James L. Hitchcock, Richard G. Price, John D. O'Brien	CBS
2012 (64th)	Dancing with the Stars	"1410A"	Charles Ciup, Seth Saint Vincent, Adam Margolis, Easter Xua, Larry Heider, Dave Levisohn, Bert Atkinson, Brian Reason, Damien Tuffereau, Hector Ramirez, Mike Malone, Bettina Levesque, Ron Lehman, Rob Palmer, Chuck Reilly	ABC
2012 (64th)	Late Show with David Letterman	"3602"	Timothy W. Kennedy, William J. White, David Dorsett, Jack Young, Karin-Lucie Grzella, Al Cialino, John Curtin, George Rothweiler, Dan Flaherty, Fred Shimizu, John Hannel, Daniel Campbell, Steven Kaufman	CBS
2012 (64th)	30 Rock	"Live from Studio 6H (West Coast)"	Steven Cimino, Barry Frischer, John Pinto, Charlie Huntley, Tim Quigley, Eric A. Eisenstein, Richard B. Fox, Marc Bloomgarden, Gerard Sava, Jeffrey Dutemple, Susan Noll, Frank Grisanti	NBC
2013 (65th)
2013 (65th)	The Big Bang Theory	"The Higgs Boson Observation"	Brian Wayne Armstrong, John Pierre Dechene, Devin Atwood, Mark Davidson, John D. O'Brien	CBS
2013 (65th)	Dancing with the Stars	"1610A"	Charles Ciup, Bert Atkinson, Larry Heider, Bettina Levesque, Dave Levisohn, Mike Malone, Adam Margolis, Rob Palmer, Hector Ramirez, Brian Reason, Seth Saint Vincent, Damien Tuffereau, Easter Xua, Ron Lehman, John O'Brien	ABC
2013 (65th)	The Daily Show with Jon Stewart	"18020"	Andre Allen, Tom Dowling, Tim Quigley, Phil Salanto, Rich York, Franco Coello, Paul Ranieri	Comedy Central
2013 (65th)	Jimmy Kimmel Live!	"12-1776"	Ervin D. Hurd, Kris Wilson, Ritch Kenney, Parker Bartlett, Greg Grouwinkel, Randy Gomez, Garrett Hurt, Bernd Reinhardt, Guy Jones	ABC
2013 (65th)	Saturday Night Live	"Host: Martin Short"	Steven Cimino, Paul Cangialosi, Eric A. Eisenstein, Barry Frischer, John Pinto, Len Wechsler, Frank Grisanti, Susan Noll	NBC
2013 (65th)	The Voice	"Live Final Performances (Season 3)"	Allan Wells, John Repczynski, Suzanne Ebner, Diane Biederbeck, Dave Hilmer, Manny Bonilla, Marc Hunter, Steve Martyniuk, Scott Kaye, Scott Hylton, Joe Coppola, Guido Frenzel, Alex Hernandez, Alex Hernandez, Jofre Rosero, Steve Simmons, Terrance Ho	NBC
2014 (66th)
2014 (66th)	Dancing with the Stars	"1711A"	Charles Ciup, Bert Atkinson, Larry Heider, Bettina Levesque, Dave Levisohn, Mike Malone, Adam Margolis, Rob Palmer, Hector Ramirez, Brian Reason, Seth Saint Vincent, Damien Tuffereau, Easter Xua, Chris Gray	ABC
2014 (66th)	The Big Bang Theory	"The Locomotive Manipulation"	Brian Wayne Armstrong, John Pierre Dechene, Ray Gonzales, James L. Hitchcock, Richard G. Price, John D. O'Brien	CBS
2014 (66th)	The Daily Show with Jon Stewart	"18153"	Andre Allen, Tom Dowling, Tim Quigley, Phil Salanto, Rich York, Paul Ranieri	Comedy Central
2014 (66th)	Jimmy Kimmel Live!	"In Austin"	Ervin D. Hurd, Parker Bartlett, Danny Bonilla, Nick Gomez, Randy Gomez, Greg Grouwinkel, Garrett Hurt, Ritch Kenney, Bernd Reinhardt, Kris Wilson, Guy Jones	ABC
2014 (66th)	Saturday Night Live	"Host: Jimmy Fallon"	Steven Cimino, Paul Cangialosi, Joe DeBonis, Kurt Decker, Eric A. Eisenstein, Barry Frischer, John Pinto, Len Wechsler, Frank Grisanti, Susan Noll	NBC
2014 (66th)	The Voice	"519A"	Allan Wells, Diane Biederbeck, Danny Bonilla, Manny Bonilla, Suzanne Ebner, Guido Frenzel, Alex Hernandez, Dave Hilmer, Marc Hunter, Scott Hylton, Katherine Iacofano, Scott Kaye, Steve Martyniuk, Jofre Rosero, Steve Simmons, Terrance Ho	NBC
2015 (67th)
2015 (67th)	Saturday Night Live	"Host: Taraji P. Henson"	Steven Cimino, Paul Cangialosi, Michael Cimino, Carl Eckett, Eric A. Eisenstein, John Pinto, Len Wechsler, Frank Grisanti, Susan Noll	NBC
2015 (67th)	The Big Bang Theory	"The Expedition Approximation"	Brian Wayne Armstrong, John Pierre Dechene, James L. Hitchcock, Richard G. Price, John D. O'Brien	CBS
2015 (67th)	The Daily Show with Jon Stewart	"20015"	Andre Allen, Tom Dowling, Paul Manecky, Tim Quigley, Phil Salanto, Rich York, Paul Ranieri	Comedy Central
2015 (67th)	Dancing with the Stars	"2009"	Charles Ciup, Bert Atkinson, Nat Havholm, Ron Lehman, Bettina Levesque, Mike Malone, Adam Margolis, Rob Palmer, Hector Ramirez, Brian Reason, Damien Tuffereau, Jeff Wheat, Easter Xua, Chris Hill, Ed Moore	ABC
2015 (67th)	Late Show with David Letterman	"4214"	Timothy W. Kennedy, William J. White, Daniel Campbell, Al Cialino, John Curtin, Dan Flaherty, Karin Lucie Grzella, John Hannel, Steve Kaufman, George Rothweiler, Fred Shimizu, Jack W. Young	CBS
2015 (67th)	The Voice	"718B"	Allan Wells, Diane Biederbeck, Danny Bonilla, Suzanne Ebner, Guido Frenzel, Alex Hernandez, Dave Hilmer, Marc Hunter, Scott Hylton, Katherine Iacofono, Scott Kaye, Steve Martyniuk, Jofre Rosero, Steve Simmons, Bryan Trieb, Terrance Ho	NBC
2016 (68th)
2016 (68th)	Dancing with the Stars	"The Finals, Part 2"	Charles Ciup, Brian Reason, Hector Ramirez, Nat Havholm, Jeff Wheat, Bert Atkinson, Bettina Levesque, Adam Margolis, Damien Tuffereau, Easter Xua, Mike Malone, Rob Palmer, Ron Lehman, Keith Dicker, Mike Carr, Ed Horton, Dylan Sanford, Freddy Frederick, Chris Hill, Ed Moore	ABC
2016 (68th)	The Big Bang Theory	"The Celebration Experimentation"	Brian Wayne Armstrong, John Pierre Dechene, James L. Hitchcock, Richard G. Price, John D. O'Brien	CBS
2016 (68th)	Jimmy Kimmel Live!	"In Brooklyn"	Ervin D. Hurd, Kris Wilson, Parker Bartlett, Greg Grouwinkel, Nick Gomez, Garrett Hurt, Bernd Reinhardt, Mark Gonzales, James Alario, Kevin Murphy, Carlos Rios, Marc Hunter, Guy Jones	ABC
2016 (68th)	Last Week Tonight with John Oliver	"303"	Dave Saretsky, John Harrison, Dante Pagano, Paul Cangialosi, Nick Fayo, Ray Hoover, Augie Yuson	HBO
2016 (68th)	Saturday Night Live	"Host: Ariana Grande"	Steven Cimino, John Pinto, Paul Cangialosi, Len Wechsler, Joe DeBonis, Eric A. Eisenstein, Susan Noll, Frank Grisanti	NBC
2016 (68th)	The Voice	"917A"	Allan Wells, Terrance Ho, Diane Biederbeck, Suzanne Ebner, Guido Frenzel, Nick Gomez, Alex Hernandez, Dave Hilmer, Marc Hunter, Scott Hylton, Katherine Iacofano, Scott Kaye, Ron Lehman, Jofre Rosero, Steve Simmons, Dan Webb	NBC
2017 (69th)
2017 (69th)	Saturday Night Live	"Host: Jimmy Fallon"	Steven Cimino, John Pinto, Paul Cangialosi, Len Wechsler, Eric Eisenstein, Dave Driscoll, Susan Noll, Frank Grisanti, Jeff Latonero, Ann Bergstrom, Randy Bittle	NBC
2017 (69th)	The Big Bang Theory	"The Locomotion Reverberation"	John D. O'Brien, John Pierre Dechene, Richard G. Price, James L. Hitchcock, Brian Wayne Armstrong, Nick Gomez	CBS
2017 (69th)	Dancing with the Stars	"2311A"	Charles Cuip, Chris Hill, Ed Moore, Brian Reason, Ron Lehman, Nathanial Havholm, Bettina Levesque, Bert Atkinson, Daryl Studebaker, Adam Margolis, Damien Tuffereau, Andy Waruszewski, Mike Malone, Mike Carr, Rob Palmer, Keith Dicker, Freddy Frederick, Ed Horton, Helena Jackson	ABC
2017 (69th)	Last Week Tonight with John Oliver	"Gerrymandering"	Dave Saretsky, Augie Yuson, Dante Pagano, John Harrison, Rob Balton, Jeff Latonero, Jerry Cancel	HBO
2017 (69th)	The Voice	"Live Finale, Part 2"	Allan Wells, Terrance Ho, Diane Biederbeck, Danny Bonilla, Suzanne Ebner, Gudio Frenzel, Alex Hernandez, Dave Hilmer, Marc Hunter, Scott Hylton, Katherine Iacofono, Scott Kaye, Ron Lehman, Steve Martynuk, John Perry, Jofre Rosero, Steve Simmons	NBC
2018 (70th)
2018 (70th)	Saturday Night Live	"Host: Donald Glover"	Steven Cimino, Susan Noll, Frank Grisanti, John Pinto, Paul Cangialosi, Len Wechsler, Dave Driscoll, Eric A. Eisenstein, Joe DeBonis	NBC
2018 (70th)	The Big Bang Theory	"The Bow Tie Asymmetry"	John D. O'Brien, John Pierre Dechene, Richard G. Price, James L. Hitchcock, Brian Wayne Armstrong, Scott I. Acosta	CBS
2018 (70th)	Dancing with the Stars	"Finale"	Charles Ciup, David Bernstein, Chris Hill, Ed Moore, Brian Reason, Ron Lehman, Nathanial Havholm, Bettina Levesque, Bert Atkinson, Daryl Studebaker, Adam Margolis, Damien Tuffereau, Andrew Waruszewski, Andrew Georgopolis, Rob Palmer, Dylan Sanford, Jeff Wheat, Mike Carr, Keith Dicker, Dave Eastwood, Travis Hays, Helena Jackson	ABC
2018 (70th)	Jimmy Kimmel Live!	"In Brooklyn: Billy Joel and Tracy Morgan"	Ervin D. Hurd, Guy Jones, Randy Gomez Jr., Parker Bartlett, David Plakos, Nick Gomez, Garrett Hurt, Mark Gonzales, Bernd Reinhardt, James Alario	ABC
2018 (70th)	Last Week Tonight with John Oliver	"421"	Dave Saretsky, August Yuson, Jerry Cancel, Paul Cangialosi, John Harrison, Dante Pagano, Jake Hoover, Joe DeBonis	HBO
2018 (70th)	The Voice	"Live Finale, Part 2"	Allan Wells, Terrance Ho, Bert Atkinson, Manny Bonilla, Danny Bonilla, Martin J. Brown Jr., Suzanne Ebner, Guido Frenzel, Nick Gomez, Alexander Hernandez, Marc Hunter, Scott Hylton, Scott Kaye, Steve Martyniuk, David Plakos, Jofre Rosero, Steve Simmons	NBC
2019 (71st)
2019 (71st)	Last Week Tonight with John Oliver	"Psychics"	Dave Saretsky, August Yuson, John Harrison, Dante Pagano, Jake Hoover, Phil Salanto	HBO
2019 (71st)	The Big Bang Theory	"The Stockholm Syndrome"	John D. O'Brien, John Pierre Dechene, Richard G. Price, James L. Hitchcock, Brian Wayne Armstrong, John E. Goforth	CBS
2019 (71st)	Conan	"Episode 1232"	Iqbal S. Hans, John Palacio Jr., Seth Saint Vincent, Nicholas Kober, Ken Dahlquist, James Palczewski, Ted Ashton	TBS
2019 (71st)	The Late Late Show with James Corden	"Post AFC Championship Show with Chris Pratt and Russell Wilson"	Oleg Sekulovski, Taylor Campanian, Joel Binger, Scott Daniels, Peter Hutchinson, Michael Jarocki, Adam Margolis, Mark McIntire, Jimmy Verlande	CBS
2019 (71st)	Saturday Night Live	"Host: Adam Sandler"	Steven Cimino, Frank Grisanti, Susan Noll, John Pinto, Paul Cangialosi, Len Wechsler, Dave Driscoll, Eric A. Eisenstein	NBC
2019 (71st)	The Voice	"Live Finale, Part 2"	Allan Wells, Terrance Ho, Diane Biederbeck, Danny Bonilla, Manny Bonilla, Robert Burnette, Suzanne Ebner, Guido Frenzel, Nick Gomez, Alex Hernandez, Marc Hunter, Scott Hylton, Katherine Iacofano, Scott Kaye, Steve Martyniuk, Jofre Rosero, Steve Simmons	NBC

=== 2020s ===
Year	Program	Episode	Nominees	Network
2020 (72nd)
2020 (72nd)	Last Week Tonight with John Oliver	"Episode 629"	Dave Saretsky, Augie Yuson, Dante Pagano, John Harrison, Rob Bolton, Tim Quigley, Phil Salanto, Rich Freedman, Joe Debonis, Michael Hauer, Lucan Owen, Scotty Buckler, Russell Swanson	HBO
2020 (72nd)	Curb Your Enthusiasm	"The Spite Store"	Jon Purdy, Patrik Thelander, Parker Tolifson, Ric Griffith	HBO
2020 (72nd)	Jimmy Kimmel Live!	"Jimmy Kimmel Live in Brooklyn - Jon Stewart, Benedict Cumberbatch, Kelly Ripa and Music from David Byrne"	Ervin D. Hurd Jr., Guy Jones, Parker Bartlett, Greg Grouwinkel, Garrett Hurt, Kris Wilson, Mark Gonzales, Nick Gomez, Bernd Reinhardt, Damien Tuffereau, Steve Garrett	ABC
2020 (72nd)	Saturday Night Live	"Host: Woody Harrelson"	Steven Cimino, Frank Grisanti, Ted Natoli, John Pinto, Paul Cangialosi, Len Wechsler, Dave Driscoll, Eric A. Eisenstein, Dante Pagano	NBC
2020 (72nd)	The Voice	"Live Finale"	Allan Wells, Terrance Ho, Diane Biederbeck, Danny Bonilla, Mano Bonilla III, Robert Burnette, Suzanne Ebner, Guido Frenzel, Alex Hernandez, Cory Hunter, Marc Hunter, Scott Hylton, Kathrine Iacofano, Scott Kaye, Steve Martyniuk, Jofre Rosero, Steve Simmons	NBC
2021 (73rd)
2021 (73rd)	Last Week Tonight with John Oliver	"Trump & Election Results / F*ck 2020"	Russell Swanson, John Schwartz, Scott Buckler, Michael Carmine, Matthew Fleischmann, Jon Graham, Dexter Kennedy, Maxwell Tubman, Michael Isler, Grgo Sevo	HBO
2021 (73rd)	America's Got Talent	"Episode 1523"	Allan Wells, Iqbal Hans, Brian Reason, Ron Lehman, David Eastwood, Adam Margolis, Dave Levisohn, John Gardner, Rob Palmer, Kary D'Alessandro, Helena Jackson, Hector Ramirez, Danny Webb, Easter Xua, Chuck Reilly	NBC
2021 (73rd)	Jimmy Kimmel Live!	"Sacha Baron Cohen, Wesley Snipes, and Music from Charlotte Lawrence"	Ervin D. Hurd Jr., Garrett Hurt, Greg Grouwinkel, Steve Garrett, Bernd Reinhardt, Kris Wilson, Guy Jones	ABC
2021 (73rd)	Saturday Night Live	"Host: Dan Levy"	Steven Cimino, John Pinto, Paul Cangialosi, Joe DeBonis, Dave Driscoll, Eric A. Eisenstein, Franco Coello, Frank Grisanti, Roberto Lopez	NBC
2021 (73rd)	The Voice	"Live Finale (Part 2)"	Allan Wells, Mano Bonilla III, Martin J. Brown Jr., Robert Burnette, Suzanne Ebner, Guido Frenzel, Alex Hernandez, Marc Hunter, Scott Hylton, Kathrine Iacofano, Scott Kaye, Steve Martyniuk, David Plakos, Ray Reynolds, Jofre Rosero, Steve Simmons, Terrance Ho	NBC
2022 (74th)
2022 (74th)	Last Week Tonight with John Oliver	"Union Busting"	Dave Saretsky, Dante Pagano, John Harrison, Rich Freedman, Ken Thompson, Yayo Vang, Elizabeth Cavanagh, Wyatt Maker, John Schwartz, Augie Yuson	HBO
2022 (74th)	American Idol	"Disney Night"	Charles Ciup, David Bernstein, Bettina Levesque, Bert Atkinson, Damien Tuffereau, Rob Palmer, Bruce Green, Daryl Studebaker, Mike Carr, Jofre Rosero, Nathanial Havholm, Easter Xua, Andrew Georgopoulos, Ed Horton, Brian Reason, Keith Dicker, Adam Margolis, Ron Lehman, Christopher Gray, Luke Chantrell	ABC
2022 (74th)	The Daily Show with Trevor Noah	"Robert Glasper Performs "Heaven's Here""	Mike Williams, Matt Muro, Rich York, Tim Quigley, Phil Salanto, Ricardo Sarmiento, Joel Sadler	Comedy Central
2022 (74th)	Dancing with the Stars	"Horror Night"	Charles Ciup, Christine Salomon, Brian Reason, Bettina Levesque, Daryl Studebaker, Bruce Green, Bert Atkinson, Nat Havholm, Ron Lehman, Mike Carr, Adam Margolis, Damien Tuffereau, Easter Xua, Derek Pratt, Mark Koonce, Allen Merriweather, Andrew Georgopoulos, Luke Chantrell, Ed Moore	ABC
2022 (74th)	The Masked Singer	"Masks Back -- The Good, The Bad & The Cuddly -- Round 1"	Christine Salomon, Nat Havholm, Mark Koonce, Brett Crutcher, Adam Margolis, Rob Palmer, Ron Lehman, Bert Atkinson, Bettina Levesque, Jeff Wheat, Kary D'Alessandro, Daryl Studebaker, John Goforth, Cary Symmons, Sean Flannery, Darin Gallacher, Chris Hill	Fox
2022 (74th)	The Voice	"Live Top 10 Performances"	Allan Wells, Danny Bonilla, Mano Bonilla, Martin J. Brown Jr., Robert Burnette, Suzanne Ebner, Guido Frenzel, Alex Hernandez, Marc Hunter, Scott Hylton, Kathrine Iacofano, Scott Kaye, Steve Martynuk, Jofre Rosero, Steve Simmons, Terrance Ho	NBC
2023 (75th)
2023 (75th)	Dancing with the Stars	"Finale"	Charles Ciup, David Bernstein, Bert Atkinson, Terry Clark, Kary D'Alessandro, James Garcia, Nathanial Havholm, Mark Koonce, Tim Lee, Ron Lehman, Bettina Levesque, Dave Levisohn, Adam Margolis, Derek Pratt, Brian Reason, Philo Solomon, Daryl Studebaker, Marc Stumpo, Damien Tuffereau, Cary Symmons	Disney+
2023 (75th)	American Idol	"Season Finale"	Charles Ciup, David Bernstein, Bert Atkinson, Danny Bonilla, Mike Carr, Kary D'Alessandro, Keith Dicker, Curtis Eastwood, Jimmy Garcia, Bruce Green, Nathanial Havholm, Ron Lehman, Bettina Levesque, Adam Margolis, Rob Palmer, Brian Reason, Daryl Studebaker, Damien Tuffereau, Easter Xua	ABC
2023 (75th)	The Masked Singer	"New York Night"	Christine Salomon, Cary Symmons, Bert Atkinson, Brett Crutcher, Kary D'Allesandro, Jimmy Garcia, John Goforth, Sean Flannery, Bettina Levesque, Adam Margolis, Mark Koonce, Daryl Studebaker, James Sullivan, Rob Palmer	Fox
2023 (75th)	The Problem with Jon Stewart	"Trump Indicted"	Dave Saretsky, Marc Bloomgarden, Franco Coello, Nick Fayo, Kevin Murphy, John Pry, Tim Quigley, Rich York	Apple TV+
2023 (75th)	The Voice	"Live Top 10 Performances"	Allan Wells, Danny Bonilla, Mano Bonilla, Martin J. Brown Jr., Robert Burnette, Suzanne Ebner, Guido Frenzel, Alex Hernandez, Scott Hylton, Kathrine Iacofano, Scott Kaye, Steve Martynuk, Jofre Rosero, Nick Tramontano, Danny Webb	NBC
2024 (76th)
2024 (76th)	Saturday Night Live	"Host: Timothée Chalamet"	Bill DiGiovanni, John Pinto, Paul Cangialosi, Anthony Tarantino, Dave Driscoll, Brian Phraner, Daniel Erbeck	NBC
2024 (76th)	America's Got Talent	"Finale Performances"	Allan Wells, Zach Greenberg, Kary D'Alessandro, John Gardner, Helena Jackson, Mark Koonce, Ron Lehman, Dave Levisohn, Adam Margolis, David Plakos, Brian Reason, Danny Webb, Easter Xua	NBC
2024 (76th)	Dancing with the Stars	"Finale"	Charles Ciup, Dave Bernstein, Bert Atkinson, Jonas Brueling, Mike Carr, Jimmy Garcia, Bruce Green, Nathanial Havholm, Ron Lehman, Bettina Levesque, Adam Margolis, Rob Palmer, Derek Pratt, Brian Reason, Jofre Rosero, Daniel Schade, Daryl Studebaker, Cary Symmons, Easter Xua	ABC
2024 (76th)	Last Week Tonight with John Oliver	"Elon Musk"	Dave Saretsky, Jerry Canćel, Franco Coello, Dante Pagano, Mark Britt, Joe DeBonis	HBO
2024 (76th)	The Late Show with Stephen Colbert	"April 8, 2024"	Karen Obel Cape, Roberto Lopez, Brian V. Cimino, Joe DeBonis, John Hannel, John Harrison, Wade Latz, Dante Pagano	CBS
2025 (77th)
2025 (77th)	Saturday Night Live	"Host: Jack Black"	Bill DiGiovanni, John Pinto, Paul Cangialosi, Anthony Tarantino, Dave Driscoll, Brian Phraner, Daniel Erbeck	NBC
2025 (77th)	After Midnight	"Featuring Jonah Ray, Kumail Nanjiani, Emily Gordon"	Christine Salomon, Lauren Gadd, Dawn Henry, Chris Hamilton, Cory Hunter, Cary Symmons, Jani Zandovskis	CBS
2025 (77th)	The Daily Show	"Jon Stewart and the News Team Live at the Chicago DNC"	Michael Williams, John Floresca, Charlie Foerschner, Jeff Latonero, James McEvoy, Matt Muro, Tim Quigley, Phil Salanto, Michael Schmehl, Rich York	Comedy Central
2025 (77th)	Everybody's Live with John Mulaney	"How Tall Are You?"	Chris Salomon, Bert Atkinson, Ed Horton, Karin Pelloni, Cole Overholser, George Prince, John Perry, Keyan Safyari, Damien Tuffereau, Suzie Weis, Terrance Ho	Netflix
2025 (77th)	The Voice	"Live Finale (Part 1)"	Allan Wells, Manny Bonilla, Mano Bonilla, Martin J. Brown Jr., Robert Burnette, Suzanne Ebner, Guido Frenzel, Alex Hernandez, Scott Hylton, Scott Kaye, Jofre Rosero, Steve Thiel, Danny Webb	NBC
2026 (78th)
2026 (78th)	The Late Show with Stephen Colbert	"The Late Show with Stephen Colbert Series Finale"	Karen Obel Cape, Brian Cimino, Joe Debonis, John Harrison, Wade Latz, Dante Pagano, John Hannel	CBS
2026 (78th)	The Daily Show	"Musical Guest: Viagra Boys"	Michael Williams, Jeff Latonero, Matt Muro, Phil Salanto, Michael Schmehl, Tim Quigley, Rich York	Comedy Central
2026 (78th)	Dancing with the Stars	"20th Birthday Party"	Charles Ciup, Ron Brasi, Daryl Studebaker, Bettina Levesque, Kary D'Alessandro, Bruce Green, Rob Palmer, Daniel Schade, Nathanial Havholm, Mike Carr, Ed Horton, Easter Xua, Brian Reason, Adam Margolis, Jonas Brueling, Dave Levisohn, Jimmy Garcia, Damien Tuffereau, Emilie Pesante, Ron Lehman	ABC
2026 (78th)	Jimmy Kimmel Live!	"Guests: Stephen Colbert, Seth Meyers, Kumail Nanjiani, Josh Meyers, and Musical Guest Reneé Rapp"	Ervin D. Hurd, David Fernandez, Tim Farmer, Steve Garrett, Mark Gonzales, Greg Grouwinkel, Garrett Hurt, Kris Wilson, Bernd Reinhardt, Marc Stumpo, George Feucht	ABC
2026 (78th)	Saturday Night Live	"Host: Olivia Rodrigo"	Bill DiGiovanni, John Pinto, Paul Cangialosi, Anthony Tarantino, Dave Driscoll, Brian Phraner, Daniel Erbeck	NBC

== Programs with multiple awards ==
15 wins

- Saturday Night Live

6 wins

- Dancing with the Stars

4 wins

- Last Week Tonight with John Oliver

3 wins

- The Golden Girls
- The Tonight Show with Jay Leno

2 wins

- American Idol
- Late Show with David Letterman

== Programs with multiple nominations ==
33 nominations

- Saturday Night Live

17 nominations

- Dancing with the Stars

13 nominations

- Late Show with David Letterman
- The Tonight Show with Jay Leno

12 nominations

- The Voice

10 nominations

- Jimmy Kimmel Live!

9 nominations

- The Big Bang Theory

8 nominations

- American Idol
- The Daily Show
- Last Week Tonight with John Oliver

7 nominations

- The Golden Girls

6 nominations

- Home Improvement

5 nominations

- Late Night with Conan O'Brien

4 nominations

- Night Court

3 nominations

- Benson
- Politically Incorrect with Bill Maher
- The Tonight Show Starring Johnny Carson

2 nominations

- America's Got Talent
- The Arsenio Hall Show
- The Charmings
- Empty Nest
- Entertainment Tonight
- Family Ties
- The John Larroquette Show
- The Late Show with Stephen Colbert
- The Masked Singer
- The Midnight Special
- The Motown Revue Starring Smokey Robinson
- Muppets Tonight
- 30 Rock
- Who's the Boss?
- Win, Lose or Draw
