= 1980 in German television =

This is a list of German television related events from 1980.

== Events ==
- 20 March - Katja Ebstein was selected to represent Germany at the 1980 Eurovision Song Contest with her song "Theater". She was selected to be the twenty-fifth German Eurovision entry during Ein Lied für Den Haag held at the BR Studios in Munich.

== Debuts ==
=== ARD ===
- 1 January – Die rote Zora und ihre Bande (1980)
- 22 January – Die Leute vom Domplatz (1980)
- 18 March – Jan vom anderen Stern (1980)
- 23 April – Krelling (1980)
- 4 June – Lucilla (1980)
- 12 June – Scheibenwischer (1980–2008)
- September – Harry Hocker läßt nicht locker (1980–1981)
- 3 September – Im schönsten Bilsengrunde (1980)
- 1 September – Achtung Zoll! (1980–1981)
- 2 October – Café Wernicke (1980–1981)
- 5 October – Familie Meier (1980)
- 6 October – Liebe ist doof (1980–1981)
- 12 October – Lucy the Menace of Street (1980)
- 12 October – Berlin Alexanderplatz (1980)
- 14 October – Susi (1980)
- 28 October – Auf Achse (1980–1996)
- 3 December – ... und die Tuba bläst der Huber (1980–1983)
- 25 December – Die Reventlow (1980)

=== ZDF ===
- 4 January – Felix und Oskar (1980)
- 8 January – Ein Park für alle (1980)
- 12 January – Merlin (1980)
- 3 February – Leute wie du und ich (1980–1984)
- 28 February – Un-Ruhestand - Geschichten vom Älterwerden (1980)
- 4 March – Anderland (1980–1986)
- 8 March – So geht's auch (1980)
- 18 September – Kreuzfahrten eines Globetrotters (1980–1981)
- 25 December – Ringstraßenpalais (1980–1986)

=== DFF ===
- 4 January – Archiv des Todes (1980)
- 22 August – Die Fischers und ihre Frauen (1980)
- 23 November – Das Mädchen Störtebeker (1980)

=== International ===
- 15 November – (Poland) / (Austria) / (Germany) The Moomins (1977–1982) (ORF)

== Television shows ==
=== 1950s ===
- Tagesschau (1952–present)

=== 1960s ===
- heute (1963–present)

=== 1970s ===
- heute-journal (1978–present)
- Tagesthemen (1978–present)
