= 1980 in television =

1980 in television may refer to:

- 1980 in American television for television-related events in the United States.
- 1980 in Australian television for television-related events in Australia.
- 1980 in Belgian television for television-related events in Belgium.
- 1980 in Brazilian television for television-related events in Brazil.
- 1980 in British television for television-related events in the United Kingdom.
  - 1980 in Scottish television for television-related events in Scotland.
- 1980 in Canadian television for television-related events in Canada.
- 1980 in Croatian television for television-related events in Croatia.
- 1980 in Danish television for television-related events in Denmark.
- 1980 in Dutch television for television-related events in the Netherlands.
- 1980 in Estonian television for television-related events in the Estonian SSR.
- 1980 in French television for television-related events in France.
- 1980 in German television for television-related events in Germany.
- 1980 in Irish television for television-related events in the Republic of Ireland.
- 1980 in Italian television for television-related events in Italy.
- 1980 in Japanese television for television-related events in Japan.
- 1980 in Philippine television for television-related events in the Philippines.
- 1980 in Spanish television for television-related events in Spain.
