= List of Philippine films =

== 20th century ==
- List of Philippine films before 1940
- List of Philippine films of the 1940s
- List of Philippine films of the 1950s
- List of Philippine films of the 1960s
- List of Philippine films of the 1970s
- List of Philippine films of the 1980s
- List of Philippine films of the 1990s

== 21st century ==
- List of Philippine films of the 2000s
- List of Philippine films of 2010
- List of Philippine films of 2011
- List of Philippine films of 2012
- List of Philippine films of 2013
- List of Philippine films of 2014
- List of Philippine films of 2015
- List of Philippine films of 2016
- List of Philippine films of 2017
- List of Philippine films of 2018
- List of Philippine films of 2019
- List of Philippine films of 2020
- List of Philippine films of 2021
- List of Philippine films of 2022
- List of Philippine films of 2023
- List of Philippine films of 2024
- List of Philippine films of 2025
- List of Philippine films of 2026
- List of Philippine films of 2027
- List of Philippine films of 2028
- List of Philippine films of 2029

== See also ==
- List of years in the Philippines
- List of years in Philippine television
