= Daniel Webb =

Daniel Webb may refer to:

- Danny Webb (British actor) (born 1958), British television and film actor
- Danny Webb (American actor) (1906–1983)
- Danny Webb (camera operator) (1952–2026), American camera operator and cinematographer
- Danny Webb (motorcyclist) (born 1991), British motorcycle racer
- Daniel Webb (baseball) (1989–2017), baseball player
- Danny Webb (footballer) (born 1983), English footballer
- Daniel Webb (writer) (1718/19–1798), Irish writer on aesthetics
- Daniel Webb (British Army officer) (died 1771), British Army general
- Dan Webb (born 1989), Australian musician
- Dan K. Webb (born 1945), American lawyer
- Danny Webb, manager and songwriter of the Danleers
