= 1972 in Philippine television =

The following is a list of events affecting Philippine television in 1972. Events listed include television show debuts, finales, cancellations, and channel launches, closures and rebrandings, as well as information about controversies and carriage disputes.

== Events ==
- September 23 – Seven television stations including MBC 11, ABC 5 (Associated Broadcasting Corporation, now TV5) and ABS-CBN 2 seized by the military to shut down television operations due to martial law.

== Premieres ==
| Date | Show |
|---|---|
| April 15 | 12 O’ Clock High on ABS-CBN 2 |

=== Unknown date ===
- November: The World Today on RBS 7 (now GMA 7)

=== Unknown ===
- Malikmata on ABC 5 (now TV5)
- Ariel con Tina on RBS 7 (now GMA 7)
- Magandang Gabi on RBS 7 (now GMA 7)
- Noontime Matinee on RBS 7 (now GMA 7)
- Sa 'Di Mo Pami on RBS 7 (now GMA 7)

== Finales ==
- April 14: Stop, Look, & Listen on ABS-CBN 2
- September 16:
  - Super Laff-In on ABS-CBN 2
  - Your Evening with Pilita on ABS-CBN 2
  - The Eddie-Nora Show on KBS 9
- September 17:
  - Family Kuarta o Kahon on ABS-CBN 2
  - Tang-Tarang-Tang on ABS-CBN 2
  - Buhay Artista on ABS-CBN 2
  - RBS Movie Festival on RBS (GMA 7)
  - At Home with Nora on ABS-CBN 2
- September 18: Boarding House on ABS-CBN 2
- September 21:
  - Damayan on ABS-CBN 2
  - Tayo'y Mag-Hapi-Hapi on MBC 11
- September 22:
  - Newsbreak on ABS-CBN 4
  - Balita Ngayon on ABS-CBN 2
  - The Big News on ABC 5 (now TV5)
  - The News with Uncle Bob on RBS 7 (now GMA 7)
  - Elisa on ABS-CBN 2
  - The World Tonight on ABS-CBN 2
  - 4 na Sulok ng Daigdig on ABS-CBN 4
  - Mga Tampok na Balita on ABS-CBN 4
  - Pangunahing Balita on ABC 5 (now TV5)
  - Top 5 Update on ABC 5 (now TV5)
  - Ano Ang Balita on MBC 11
  - 12 O’ Clock High on ABS-CBN 2
  - D'Sensations on ABS-CBN 2
  - Carmen on Camera on ABC 5 (now TV5)

=== Unknown ===
- Two for the Road on ABS-CBN 2
- Family Theater on ABS-CBN 2
- Limbo on ABS-CBN 2
- Mga Aninong Gumagalaw on ABS-CBN 2
- Bigay-Hilig on ABS-CBN 2
- Cafeteria Aroma on ABS-CBN 2
- Tayo'y Mag-Hapi-Hapi on ABS-CBN 2
- TV Kinderland on ABS-CBN 2
- The Baby O' Brien Show on ABS-CBN 2
- The Eddie and Nova Plus on ABS-CBN 2
- The Nestor and Nida Show on ABS-CBN 2
- Wala Kang Paki on ABS-CBN 2
- On with the Show on ABS-CBN 2
- Tawag ng Tanghalan on ABS-CBN 2
- Winner Take All on ABS-CBN 2
- Color Movie Greats on ABS-CBN 2
- Puting Tabing on ABS-CBN 2
- The Marvel Super Heroes on ABS-CBN 2
- Tom and Jerry on ABS-CBN 2
- Tony Weekend Supreme on ABS-CBN 2
- Bonanza on ABS-CBN 2
- Hawaii Five-O on ABS-CBN 2
- The Doris Day Show on ABS-CBN 2
- Aawitan Kita on ABS-CBN 4
- Big Tagalog Movies on ABS-CBN 4
- Impact with Max Soliven on ABS-CBN 4
- In Focus: The Six Halves on ABS-CBN 4
- Kuro-Kuro on ABS-CBN 4
- Premyo sa Kwatro on ABS-CBN 4
- Repeat Performance on ABS-CBN 4
- Sandigan on ABS-CBN 4
- The Mod Squad on ABS-CBN 4
- The Scene on ABS-CBN 4
- Dancetime with Chito on RBS (now GMA 7)
- Maiba Naman on RBS 7 (now GMA 7)
- American Movies on RBS 7 (now GMA 7)
- Tagalog Movies on RBS 7 (now GMA 7)
- Sign-Off on RBS 7 (now GMA 7)
- The Mary Tyler Moore Show on RBS 7 (now GMA 7)
- Vigilantes on IBC 13
- Aliw ng Buhay on MBC 11
- Catch Up with Tirso on MBC 11
- Cinema Eleven on MBC 11
- Dateline News on MBC 11
- Etchos Lang on MBC 11
- Kusina Jamboree on MBC 11
- M Squad on MBC 11
- Mercedes Interview on MBC 11
- People Want to Know on MBC 11
- Return Engagement on MBC 11
- Sampaguita't Bago on MBC 11
- Straight from the Shoulder on MBC 11
- The Man from U.N.C.L.E. on MBC 11
- The Nite Owl Dance Party on MBC 11
- Tightrope! on MBC 11
- Aliw ng Tahanan on ABC 5 (now TV5)
- Ang Nasasakdal on ABC 5 (now TV5)
- Bahaghari on ABC 5 (now TV5)
- Balintataw on ABC 5 (now TV5)
- Best of Hollywood on ABC 5 (now TV5)
- Dance-O-Rama on ABC 5 (now TV5)
- Festival Five on ABC 5 (now TV5)
- For Men Only on ABC 5 (now TV5)
- Ituloy Ang Saya! on ABC 5 (now TV5)
- Jonny Quest on ABC 5 (now TV5)
- Malikmata on ABC 5 (now TV5)
- Million Dollar Movies on ABC 5 (now TV5)
- My Melody on ABC 5 (now TV5)
- Salu-Salungat on ABC 5 (now TV5)
- Sinagtala on ABC 5 (now TV5)
- The Flintstones on ABC 5 (now TV5)
- The Peter Potamus Show on ABC 5 (now TV5)

== Channels ==
=== Closures ===
- September 23:
  - MBC 11
  - ABC 5
  - ABS-CBN 2

== Births ==
- January 30 – Zoren Legaspi, actor and film director
- April 27 – Manilyn Reynes, actress and singer
- April 28 – Romnick Sarmenta, actor
- June 25 – Chokoleit, comedian, actor, and TV host (d. 2019)

== See also ==
- 1972 in television
