= 1987 in Philippine television =

The following is a list of events affecting Philippine television in 1987. Events listed include television show debuts, finales, cancellations, and channel launches, closures and rebrandings, as well as information about controversies and carriage disputes.

== Events ==
- January 27–29 – Rebel soldiers loyal to former president Ferdinand Marcos seized the GMA Network compound in Quezon City. The two-day plot ended in a skirmish, killing a rebel soldier and 35 others were hurt.
- March 1 – ABS-CBN was relaunched as the Star Network.
- May 11 - Coverage of the 1987 legislative elections are covered by all stations, PTV airs the first true via-satellite national election coverage for the first time since 1986.
- August 1 - ABS-CBN debuts Saturday Shopping with Mr. and Mrs., the first modern homeshopping block on Philippine TV.
- August 28 - The ABS-CBN Broadcasting Center and its studios, as well as PTV's, and Broadcast City, are all briefly captured during the coup attempt that month by the Reform the Armed Forces Movement (RAM) led by Colonel Gregorio Honasan. President Corazon Aquino appears later on GMA-7 to condemn the capture of the stations.

== Premieres ==
Date	Show
January 4	Sic O'Clock News on IBC 13
January 5	GMA News Live on GMA 7
January 14	Straight from the Shoulder (2nd incarnation) on GMA 7
February 28	Movie Magazine on GMA 7
March 2	Gintong Kristal on GMA 7
March 2	Let's Go Crazy on ABS-CBN 2
March 2	Star Smile Factory on ABS-CBN 2
March 2	TV Patrol on ABS-CBN 2
March 2	Not so Late Night with Edu on ABS-CBN 2
March 2	Captain Barbell on RPN 9
March 2	Kalatog Pinggan on ABS-CBN 2
March 3	Palibhasa Lalake on ABS-CBN 2
March 3	Rumors: Facts and Humors on ABS-CBN 2
March 4	Chika Chika Chicks on ABS-CBN 2
March 4	Loveli-Ness on ABS-CBN 2
March 5	Regal Presents on ABS-CBN 2
March 5	Young Love, Sweet Love on RPN 9
March 6	Probe on ABS-CBN 2
March 7	Family Rosary Crusade on ABS-CBN 2
March 7	Martin and Pops Twogether on ABS-CBN 2
March 7	Dance-2-Nite on ABS-CBN 2
March 8	Kabuhayan Muna on ABS-CBN 2
March 8	Tawag ng Tanghalan (2nd incarnation; season 1) on ABS-CBN 2
March 8	Always, Snooky on ABS-CBN 2
March 8	Million Dollar Movies (2nd incarnation) on ABS-CBN 2
April 24	Mother Studio Presents on GMA 7
May 23	Mga Kwento ni Lola on ABS-CBN 2
June 3	Barrio Balimbing on ABS-CBN 2
August 1	Saturday Shopping with Mr. and Ms. on ABS-CBN 2
August 13	Chicks for Cats on IBC 13
August 31	Kaming Mga Ulila on GMA 7
September 6	Shades on GMA 7
September 7	Agila on RPN 9
October 5	Kapihan sa Nayon on IBC 13
October 26	Pangunahing Balita on PTV 4
October 26	News on 4 on PTV 4
October 30	Cloud Nine on RPN 9
November 6	Apple Pie, Patis, Pate, Atbp. on RPN 9
November 11	Balintataw on PTV 4
November 17	Maricel Regal Drama Special on ABS-CBN 2
November 26	Okay Ka, Fairy Ko! on IBC 13
December 4	Super Suerte sa 9 on RPN 9

=== Unknown date ===
- April: Ang Pamilya Ko on ABS-CBN 2

=== Unknown ===
- Na-Kuh Eh, Eto nAPO Sila! on ABS-CBN 2
- Tonight with Merce on ABS-CBN 2
- Zsa Zsa on ABS-CBN 2
- Wanbol High on ABS-CBN 2
- Talents Unlimited on ABS-CBN 2
- Misis of the 80's on ABS-CBN 2
- Monday Night with Edu on ABS-CBN 2
- Malacañang This Week on ABS-CBN 2
- Battle Fever J on ABS-CBN 2
- Bioman on ABS-CBN 2
- Goggle-V on ABS-CBN 2
- Laserion on ABS-CBN 2
- Machineman on ABS-CBN 2
- Mechander Robo on ABS-CBN 2
- Voltes V on ABS-CBN 2
- ALF on ABS-CBN 2
- Family Ties on ABS-CBN 2
- Moonlighting on ABS-CBN 2
- Perfect Strangers on ABS-CBN 2
- The Young and the Restless on ABS-CBN 2
- Plataporma at Isyu on IBC 13
- Public Forum on IBC 13
- Tapatan Kay Luis Beltran on IBC 13
- Regal Theatre on IBC 13
- Viva Telecine sa 13 on IBC 13
- Squad 13 on IBC 13
- Eh Kasi, Babae on IBC 13
- O, Sige! on IBC 13
- Pubhouse on IBC 13
- Working Girls on IBC 13
- Sesame Street on IBC 13
- Spectacular Action on Screen on IBC 13
- Kalatog sa Trese on IBC 13
- Rambo: The Force of Freedom on IBC 13
- G.I. Joe: A Real American Hero on IBC 13
- Rainbow Brite on IBC 13
- Penpen de Sarapen on RPN 9
- Ang Manok ni San Pedro on RPN 9
- Co-Ed Blues on RPN 9
- Agos on RPN 9
- Flordeluna: Book 2 on RPN 9
- Showbiz Talk of the Town on RPN 9
- Challenge of the GoBots on RPN 9
- Muppet Babies on RPN 9
- Sining Siete on GMA 7
- Good Morning Showbiz on GMA 7
- Someone's on Your Side on GMA 7
- Golpe de Gulo on GMA 7
- Velez This Week on GMA 7
- Inhumanoids on GMA 7
- SilverHawks on GMA 7
- The Transformers on PTV 4

== Returning or renamed programs ==
Show	Last aired	Retitled as/Season/Notes	Channel	Return date
Straight from the Shoulder	1972 (MBC)	Same (2nd incarnation)	GMA	January 14
Chicks to Chicks	1987 (IBC)	Chika Chika Chicks	ABS-CBN	March 4
Philippine Amateur Basketball League	1986 (season 4: "Filipino Cup")	Same (season 5: "International Invitational Cup")	PTV	March 4
Tawag ng Tanghalan	1972	Same (2nd incarnation; season 1)	ABS-CBN	March 8
Million Dollar Movies	1972 (ABC)	Same (2nd incarnation)	ABS-CBN	March 8
Philippine Basketball Association	1986 (season 12: "Open Conference")	Same (season 13: "Open Conference")	PTV	March 22
Philippine Amateur Basketball League	1987 (season 5: "International Invitational Cup")	Same (season 5: "Freedom Cup")	PTV	May
Philippine Basketball Association	1987 (season 13: "Open Conference")	Same (season 13: "All-Filipino Conference")	PTV	July 12
Philippine Amateur Basketball League	1987 (season 5: "Freedom Cup")	Same (season 5: "Philippine Cup")	PTV	August 3
Philippine Basketball Association	1987 (season 13: "All-Filipino Conference")	Same (season 13: "World Challenge Cup")	PTV	September 20
Philippine Basketball Association	1987 (season 13: "World Challenge Cup")	Same (season 13: "Reinforced Conference")	PTV	October 4
Philippine Amateur Basketball League	1987 (season 5: "Philippine Cup")	Same (season 5: "Maharlika Cup")	PTV	October 10
Pangunahing Balita	1972 (ABC)	Same (2nd incarnation)	PTV	October 26

== Programs transferring networks ==
Date	Show	No. of seasons	Moved from	Moved to
January 14	Straight from the Shoulder	—N/a	MBC	GMA
March 4	Chicks to Chicks	—N/a	IBC	ABS-CBN (as Chika Chika Chicks)
March 8	Million Dollar Movies	—N/a	ABC	ABS-CBN
October 26	Pangunahing Balita	—N/a	ABC	PTV
Unknown	Goin' Bananas	—N/a	IBC	ABS-CBN
Unknown	Sesame Street	—N/a	BBC (now ABS-CBN)	IBC
Unknown	Not So Late Night With Edu	—N/a	GMA	ABS-CBN
Unknown	Voltes V	—N/a	PTV	ABS-CBN

== Finales ==
- January 4: GMA News Digest on GMA 7
- February 15: The Penthouse Live! on GMA 7
- February 25: Chicks to Chicks on IBC 13
- February 27:
  - Balita Ngayon on ABS-CBN 2
  - Amorsola on GMA 7
  - Mirasol del Cielo on GMA 7
- April 11: Andrea Amor on IBC 13
- April 15: Nestle Special on ABS-CBN 2
- August 22: Showbiz na Showbiz on ABS-CBN 2
- September 4: Heredero on RPN 9
- September 10: Mommy Ko, Daddy Ko! on ABS-CBN 2
- September 11: Nine-Teeners on ABS-CBN 2
- October 23:
  - Early Evening Report on PTV 4
  - Early Late-Night Report on PTV 4
- November 10: Regal Drama Presents on ABS-CBN 2
- December 16: Heartbeat on GMA 7
- December 18: Probe on ABS-CBN 2

=== Unknown ===
- Na-Kuh Eh, Eto nAPO Sila! on ABS-CBN 2
- Tonight with Merce on ABS-CBN 2
- Triple Treat on ABS-CBN 2
- Mga Kwento ni Lola on ABS-CBN 2
- Parak on ABS-CBN 2
- Wanbol High on ABS-CBN 2
- Monday Night with Edu on ABS-CBN 2
- Business and Pleasure on ABS-CBN 2
- Kabuhayan Muna on ABS-CBN 2
- Malacañang This Week on ABS-CBN 2
- Plataporma at Isyu on IBC 13
- Inhumanoids on ABS-CBN 2
- Truth Forum on IBC 13
- Hiyas on IBC 13
- Regal Theatre on IBC 13
- Squad 13 on IBC 13
- Chicks to Chicks on IBC 13
- Eh Kasi, Babae on IBC 13
- O, Sige! on IBC 13
- Working Girls on IBC 13
- Star Cafe on IBC 13
- Scoop on IBC 13
- Ringside at Elorde on IBC 13
- Spectacular Action on Screen on IBC 13
- Gideon 300 on IBC 13
- Rambo: The Force of Freedom on IBC 13
- Rainbow Brite on IBC 13
- Daigdig ng mga Artista sa Telebisyon on GMA 7
- Not So Late Night with Edu on GMA 7
- See True on GMA 7
- Interaction on GMA 7
- Weekend with Velez on GMA 7
- Christ is the Answer on GMA 7
- SilverHawks on GMA 7
- Challenge of the GoBots on RPN 9
- The Transformers on PTV 4
- Voltes V on PTV 4

== Births ==
- January 29 – DM Sevilla, actor
- February 5 – Barbie Salvador-Muhlach, news anchor, former beauty queen (Mutya ng Pilipinas 2010 and Miss Tourism International 2010) and former radio personality
- March 16 – Paw Diaz, former actress
- March 27 – Markki Stroem. actor, singer and TV Personality
- April 15 – Cathy Beltran, Broadcaster (Former 26K Model)
- May 4 – Monica Verallo, Filipina journalist and TV host
- May 15 – Jennylyn Mercado, actress, singer, former Matinee Idol
- June 1 – Johan Santos, actor and TV Host
- June 7 - Lizzy Pecson
- June 11 – Kean Cipriano, actor, commercial, endorsement
- June 20 – Daiana Menezes, actress
- August 9 – Hazel Uy
- August 11 – Alyssa Alano, former actress
- August 18 – Sam Y.G., Radio DJ, singer and TV host
- August 23 – Nikki Gil, actress, endorsement, VTR Voice
- August 30 – Czarina Balba-Guevara (DJ Chacha), actress, radio journalist and radio DJ
- September 13 –
  - John James Uy, actor, TV Host, model
  - Marvin Barrameda, TV Host and actor
- September 19 - Maoui David, actress and news anchor
- September 26 – Maricris Garcia, singer
- September 29 – Max Eigenmann, actress, singer model
- September 30 – Denise Laurel, actress, endorsement, commercial
- October 17 – Bea Alonzo, actress, endorsement, commercial
- October 22 – Jade Lopez, actress
- November 4 – Michelle Madrigal, actress
- November 28 – Bianca Manalo, actress
- December 19 – Slater Young, actor
- December 21 –
  - Ryza Cenon, actress
  - Valerie Concepcion, actress
- December 25 –
  - Bettina Carlos, actress
  - LJ Reyes, actress
- December 30 – Jake Cuenca, actor, endorsement, VTR Voice, commercial, host

== See also ==
- 1987 in the Philippines
- 1987 in television
