= 1975 in Philippine television =

The following is a list of events affecting Philippine television in 1975. Events listed include television show debuts, finales, cancellations, and channel launches, closures and rebrandings, as well as information about controversies and carriage disputes.

== Events ==
- February 1 – The Intercontinental Broadcasting Corporation relaunched in the Philippines back on March 1, 1960.
- April 9 – The Philippine Basketball Association was inaugurated at Araneta Coliseum in Quezon City, with the Banahaw Broadcasting Corporation as its first coveror.
- October 1 – Thrilla in Manila
- December 1 – GMA Radio-Television Arts launches Kapwa Ko Mahal Ko.

== Premieres ==
Date	Show
February 3	Mid-day Report on IBC 13
February 3	Newsday on IBC 13
February 3	Newsday Cebu on IBC 13 Cebu
April 9	PBA on BBC on BBC 2
December 1	Damayan on GTV 4
December 1	Kapwa Ko Mahal Ko on GMA 7

=== Unknown dates ===
- January: Student Canteen on GMA 7

=== Unknown ===
- Christina on BBC 2
- Katha on GMA 7
- Katha-katha on GMA 7
- Tanghalan on GMA 7
- Discorama on GMA 7
- John Osteen on GMA 7
- Little House on the Prairie on GMA 7
- Chico and the Man on GMA 7
- MLB on GMA 7
- Spin-A-Win on KBS 9
- OK Lang on IBC 13
- Habang May Buhay on IBC 13
- Apat na Sikat on IBC 13
- Good Afternoon Po... Guguluhin Namin Kayo... Salamat Po on IBC 13
- Jesus Miracle Crusade on IBC 13
- The Wild Wild West on IBC 13
- IBCinema on IBC 13
- PPP: Piling-Piling Pelikula on IBC 13
- Tarzan on IBC 13
- Gunsmoke on IBC 13
- Lancer (season 1) on GMA 7
- Cade's County on GMA 7
- $6,000,000 Man (season 1) on KBS 9
- Superstar on KBS 9

== Programs transferring networks ==
Date	Show	No. of seasons	Moved from	Moved to
January	Student Canteen	—N/a	ABS-CBN (now BBC 2)	GMA Network
December 1	Damayan	—N/a	ABS-CBN (now BBC 2)	GTV 4
Unknown	Gunsmoke	—N/a	RBS 7 (now GMA 7)	IBC 13

== Finales ==
- December 14: PBA on BBC on BBC 2

=== Unknown ===
- Police Story on BBC 2
- Nagmamahal, Amalia on BBC 2
- Lunch Break on GMA 7
- Penthouse Seven on GMA 7
- Pamilya Bato-Balani on GMA 7
- Maiba Naman on GMA 7
- Vigilantes on IBC 13
- Dahong Ginto on IBC 13
- OK Lang on IBC 13
- Lancer (season 1) on GMA 7
- Cade's County on GMA 7
- $6,000,000 Man (season 1) on KBS 9

== Births ==
- January 16 – Anthony Taberna, TV & Radio host, Anchor
- February 7 – Ian Veneracion, Filipino actor
- February 11 – Lourd de Veyra, TV Host, TV5 & Vocalist of Radioactive Sago Project
- March 14 – Rico Yan, Filipino actor (d. 2002)
- May 20 – Miriam Quiambao, Filipina actress and first runner-up in Miss Universe 1999
- August 7 – Almira Muhlach, Filipina actress
- August 17 – Carmina Villarroel, Filipina actress, TV host and Former model
- October 17 – Vina Morales, singer and actress
- November 6 – Tisha Silang
- November 30 – Diego Castro III, Filipino journalist and actor
- December 29 – William Thio, Filipino journalist and TV host

== See also ==
- 1975 in television
