= 2027 in television =

2027 in television may refer to

- 2027 in American television for television–related events in the United States
- 2027 in Brazilian television for television–related events in Brazil
- 2027 in British television for television–related events in the United Kingdom
- 2027 in Scottish television for television–related events in Scotland
- 2027 in Canadian television for television–related events in Canada
- 2027 in Croatian television for television–related events in Croatia
- 2027 in Dutch television for television–related events in the Netherlands
- 2027 in Irish television for television–related events in the Republic of Ireland
- 2027 in Japanese television for television–related in Japan
- 2027 in Philippine television for television–related in the Philippines
- 2027 in Russian television for television–related in Russia
- 2027 in South Korean television for television–related in the South Korea
- 2027 in Spanish television for television–related in the Spain
- 2027 in Tamil television for television–related in the Tamil language
