= 1983 in Dutch television =

This is a list of Dutch television related events from 1983.

== Events ==
- 23 February – Bernadette is selected to represent Netherlands at the 1983 Eurovision Song Contest with her song "Sing Me a Song". She is selected to be the twenty-eighth Dutch Eurovision entry during Nationaal Songfestival held at Congresgebouw in The Hague.
- 23 April – Luxembourg wins the Eurovision Song Contest with the song "Si la vie est cadeau" by Corinne Hermès. The Netherlands finish in seventh place with their entry "Sing Me a Song" by Bernadette.

== Debuts ==
- 2 November – (United Kingdom) Postman Pat

== Television shows ==
=== 1950s ===
- NOS Journaal (1956–present)

=== 1970s ===
- Sesamstraat (1976–present)

=== 1980s ===
- Jeugdjournaal (1981–present)

== Births ==
- 18 January – Emiel Sandtke, actor
- 15 November – Vivienne van den Assem, actress & TV presenter
