= Anderland =

- Country of origin: Germany

Original release
- Release: March 4, 1980 – December 14, 1986

Anderland is a 45-part German children's mystery television series which aired for the first time on 4 March 1980 on ZDF. It starred Carlo Ianni, Dirk Zalm, Mira Gittner and Loni von Friedl.

== See also ==
- List of German television series
