= 1988 in Philippine television =

The following is a list of events effecting Philippine television in 1988. Events listed include television show debuts, finales, cancellations, and channel launches, closures and rebrandings, as well as information about controversies and carriage disputes.

== Events ==
- August 29: TV Patrol Cebu is launched on DYCB Channel 3, the first regional edition of the national TV Patrol newscast, airing an hour of national and local news at primetime until December when it moved to late afternoons and its broadcast reduced to 30 minutes.
- November 7: The Tower of Power transmitter was inaugurated by President Aquino and GMA Network executives. Afterwards, a TV special entitled "GMA-7 POWER" was shown to commemorate the event.
- December 10: Following years of trial runs beginning in 1969, ABS-CBN switches on its debut nationwide satellite broadcast using the DOMSAT system, with a starting four-hour block of national programming aired to all provincial and/or regional stations nationwide.
- December 12: Negros Occidental becomes second province to host a localized TV Patrol edition with the launch of TV Patrol Negros.

== Premieres ==
Date	Show
January 11	Eye to Eye on GMA 7
January 11	Cinemascoop on ABS-CBN 2
February 14	Tawag ng Tanghalan (2nd incarnation; season 2) on ABS-CBN 2
March 5	Dance Tonight on IBC 13
March 6	The Sharon Cuneta Show on ABS-CBN 2
March 9	Tonight with Dick and Carmi on ABS-CBN 2
March 16	Loveliness on IBC 13
May 20	The Probe Team on GMA 7
June 2	Ryan Ryan Musikahan on ABS-CBN 2
June 13	Kapag May Katwiran, Ipaglaban Mo! on IBC 13
July 30	Martin After Dark on GMA 7
August 5	Buddy Boy on IBC 13
August 21	Magandang Gabi... Bayan on ABS-CBN 2
August 24	Regal Drama Hour on ABS-CBN 2
August 29	TV Patrol Cebu on ABS-CBN TV-3 Cebu
September 17	Chikiting Patrol on ABS-CBN 2
October 4	RVQ Movies Special on RPN 9
October 29	Star Brighters on PTV 4
December 12	TV Patrol 4 on ABS-CBN TV-4 Bacolod

=== Unknown date ===
- October: Afternoon Delight on ABS-CBN 2

=== Unknown ===
- Jesus Miracle Crusade on GMA 7
- Evelio on GMA 7
- Kadenang Rosas on GMA 7
- Pinoy Wrestling on PTV 4
- Pag-ibig o Karangalan on ABS-CBN 2
- Umiikot ang Kapalaran on ABS-CBN 2
- Bedtime Stories on ABS-CBN 2
- Discovery Drama Theater on ABS-CBN 2
- Pinoy Fantasy on ABS-CBN 2
- Teen Pan Alley on ABS-CBN 2
- Dina on ABS-CBN 2
- Morning Treats on ABS-CBN 2
- Bahay Kalinga on ABS-CBN 2
- Manila, Manila on ABS-CBN 2
- A Dangerous Life on ABS-CBN 2
- Kidsongs on ABS-CBN 2
- Denjiman on ABS-CBN 2
- Shaider on ABS-CBN 2
- The Highwayman on ABS-CBN 2
- Rey Langit: The Philippine Connection on IBC 13
- Seiko Supernatural Stories on IBC 13
- Ayos Lang, Tsong! on IBC 13
- Tic Tac Boom on IBC 13
- Tanghalan ng Kampeon on GMA 7
- Date a Star on GMA 7
- Just for Fun on GMA 7
- Veritas Monitors on GMA 7
- Gideon 300 on GMA 7
- Midnight Prayer Helps on GMA 7
- Tinig sa Itaas on GMA 7
- Banyuhay on RPN 9
- Charo on RPN 9
- Dear Manilyn on RPN 9
- Muscles in Motion on RPN 9
- Seiko TV Presents on RPN 9
- Stir on RPN 9
- Wari Waro on RPN 9
- Voltes V on RPN 9
- Bantay Kongreso on PTV 4
- Diwa ng Katotohanan on PTV 4
- Windows with Johnny Revilla on PTV 4
- Oks na Oks on PTV 4
- Sharivan on IBC 13

== Returning or renamed programs ==
Show	Last aired	Retitled as/Season/Notes	Channel	Return date
Scoop	1987 (IBC)	Cinemascoop	ABS-CBN	January 11
Tawag ng Tanghalan	1988 (2nd incarnation; season 1)	Same (2nd incarnation; season 2)	ABS-CBN	February 14
Dance-2-Nite	1988 (ABS-CBN)	Dance Tonight	IBC	March 5
Philippine Amateur Basketball League	1987 (season 5: "Maharlika Cup")	Same (season 6: "International Invitational Cup")	PTV	March 19
Philippine Basketball Association	1987 (season 13: "Reinforced Conference")	Same (season 14: "Open Conference")	PTV	March 20
Philippine Amateur Basketball League	1988 (season 6: "International Invitational Cup")	Same (season 6: "Freedom Cup")	PTV	May
Philippine Basketball Association	1988 (season 14: "Open Conference")	Same (season 14: "All-Filipino Conference")	PTV	June 26
Philippine Basketball Association	1988 (season 14: "All-Filipino Conference")	Same (season 14: "World Challenge Cup")	PTV	September 18
Philippine Basketball Association	1988 (season 14: "World Challenge Cup")	Same (season 14: "Reinforced Conference")	PTV	October 2
Philippine Amateur Basketball League	1988 (season 6: "Freedom Cup")	Same (season 6: "Maharlika Cup")	PTV	October 15

== Programs transferring networks ==
Date	Show	No. of seasons	Moved from	Moved to
January 11	Scoop	—N/a	IBC	ABS-CBN (as Cinemascoop)
March 5	Dance Tonight	—N/a	ABS-CBN	IBC (as Dance-2-Nite)
March 6	The Sharon Cuneta Show	—N/a	IBC	ABS-CBN
March 16	Loveliness	—N/a	ABS-CBN	IBC
May 20	The Probe Team	—N/a	ABS-CBN	GMA
Unknown	Jesus Miracle Crusade	—N/a	IBC	GMA
Unknown	Gideon 3000	—N/a	IBC	GMA
Unknown	Voltes V	—N/a	ABS-CBN	RPN

== Finales ==
- January 17: Tawag ng Tanghalan (2nd incarnation; season 1) on ABS-CBN 2
- February 27: Dance-2-Nite on ABS-CBN 2
- February 28: The Sharon Cuneta Show on IBC 13
- March 9: Loveliness on ABS-CBN 2
- April 28: Napakasakit Kuya Eddie on ABS-CBN 2
- April 30: Martin and Pops Twogether on ABS-CBN 2
- October 21
  - Cinemascoop on ABS-CBN 2
  - Kalatog sa Trese on IBC 13
- November 26: Barrio Balimbing on ABS-CBN 2
- December 20: Rumors: Facts and Humors on ABS-CBN 2
- December 24: Dance Tonight on IBC 13
- December 25: Tawag ng Tanghalan (2nd incarnation; season 2) on ABS-CBN 2

=== Unknown date ===
- October:
  - Ang Bagong Kampeon on RPN 9
  - Katalog Pinggan on ABS-CBN 2

=== Unknown ===
- Gintong Kristal on GMA 7
- Evelio on GMA 7
- Angkan on ABS-CBN 2
- Bedtime Stories on ABS-CBN 2
- Always, Snooky on ABS-CBN 2
- Teen Pan Alley on ABS-CBN 2
- Zsa Zsa on ABS-CBN 2
- Talents Unlimited on ABS-CBN 2
- Misis of the 80's on ABS-CBN 2
- Children's Hour on ABS-CBN 2
- A Dangerous Life on ABS-CBN 2
- Battle Fever J on ABS-CBN 2
- Bioman on ABS-CBN 2
- Kidsongs on ABS-CBN 2
- Mechander Robo on ABS-CBN 2
- Moonlighting on ABS-CBN 2
- The Highwayman on ABS-CBN 2
- Tom and Jerry on ABS-CBN 2
- Voltes V on ABS-CBN 2
- Flordeluna: Book 2 on RPN 9
- Rey Langit: The Philippine Connection on IBC 13
- Sunday Special, Iba Ito on IBC 13
- Tapatan Kay Luis Beltran on IBC 13
- Viva Telecine sa 13 on IBC 13
- Seiko Supernatural Stories on IBC 13
- Ayos Lang, Tsong! on IBC 13
- Chicks for Cats on IBC 13
- Pubhouse on IBC 13
- Tic Tac Boom on IBC 13
- Jesus Miracle Crusade on IBC 13
- Sining Siete on GMA 7
- Shades on GMA 7
- Late Night with June & Johnny on GMA 7
- Ang Say Mo... Mahalaga! on GMA 7
- Just for Fun on GMA 7
- Veritas Monitors on GMA 7
- Agos on RPN 9
- Charo on RPN 9
- Co-Ed Blues on RPN 9
- Lotlot & Friends on RPN 9
- Maricel Live! on RPN 9
- Plaza 1899 on RPN 9
- Showbiz Talk of the Town on RPN 9
- Simply Snooky on RPN 9
- Stir on RPN 9
- Teenage Diary on RPN 9
- Verdadero on RPN 9
- 2+2=4 on PTV 4
- Bantay Kongreso on PTV 4
- Meet the Press on PTV 4
- Oks na Oks on PTV 4

== Births ==
- January 6 – Mikael Daez, actor, basketball player and TV commercial, print and ramp model
- January 16 – Alex Gonzaga, TV host, actress
- January 21 – Glaiza de Castro, singer, actress
- January 27 – Miguel Mendoza, singer, actor
- February 18 – C. J. Muere, actor, TV host
- March 2 – Nadine Samonte, actress and model
- March 6 – Isabelle Daza, actress and model
- March 9 – Alodia Gosiengfiao
- March 13 – Benjamin Belarmino, actor and TV Host
- April 2 – Ellen Adarna, actress and model
- April 6 – Melai Cantiveros
- April 24 – Jinri Park, actress, model and radio DJ
- April 26 – Hazel Ann Mendoza, actress
- May 12 – Marky Cielo, actor and dancer (d. 2008)
- May 13 – Paulo Avelino, actor and dancer
- May 20 – Madeleine Humphries, actress and model
- May 23 – Vaness del Moral, actress
- June 2 – Chuck Allie, actor, dancer and TV Host
- June 11 – Gabriel Valenciano, actor and dancer
- June 15 – Kevin Santos, actor and TV Host
- July 7 – Venus Raj, Miss Universe 2010, 4th runner–up
- July 22 – Renz Ongkiko, news anchor model and journalist
- July 25 – Sarah Geronimo, singer, actress and television host
- August 11 – Benjamin Benj Pacia, Broadcaster, TV Personality (former actor)
- August 24 – Helga Krapf, actress
- August 26 – Niña Jose, actress
- August 29 – Iwa Moto, actress and model
- September 2 – Jeric Rizalado, Broadcaster and TV Personality (former actor)
- October 4 – Joseph Marco, actor
- October 5 – Maja Salvador, singer, actress
- November 10 – Pauleen Luna, TV host, actress and wife of Vic Sotto
- November 19 – JC Santos, actor
- November 20 – Ariella Arida, Miss Universe 2013, 3rd runner–up
- November 21 – Nicolette Henson, Binibining Pilipinas 2010, 2nd runner–up
- November 28 – Daniel Matsunaga, actor and model
- December 4 – Yeng Constantino, singer
- December 14 – Eda Nolan, actress

== Deaths ==
- September 30 – Chino Roces, founder of ABC 5 (b. 1913)

== See also ==
- 1988 in television
