= 1980 in Philippine television =

The following is a list of events affecting Philippine television in 1980. Events listed include television show debuts, finales, cancellations, and channel launches, closures and rebrandings, as well as information about controversies and carriage disputes.

== Events ==
- January 15 – RPN 9 starts nationwide satellite broadcasts via DOMSAT.
- July 30 – Tito, Vic and Joey de Leon celebrated the 1st anniversary of Eat Bulaga!.

== Premieres ==
Date	Show
February 4	Anna Liza on GMA 7
April 10	Champoy on RPN 9
September 7	Lovingly Yours, Helen on GMA 7
October 5	Ating Alamin on MBS 4

=== Unknown ===
- Karnabal Dos on BBC 2
- Ladies and Gentlemen on City2
- Maria Morena on City2
- Prrrt... Foul! on BBC 2
- NewsCenter 4 on MBS 4
- Good Morning Manila on MBS 4
- Tele-Aralan ng Kakayahan on MBS 4
- Musika ng Lahi on MBS 4
- MBS Primetime Movie on MBS 4
- Pilita & Eddie on GMA 7
- Face the Nation on GMA 7
- Who Knows That? on GMA 7
- Guidelines with Dr. Harold J. Sala on GMA 7
- Heartbeat on GMA 7
- Knots Landing on GMA 7
- The Persuaders! on GMA 7
- Benson on GMA 7
- That's Incredible! on GMA 7
- Lucky Stars on RPN 9
- Duplex on RPN 9
- Joey and Son on RPN 9
- Sealab 2020 on RPN 9
- COMELEC Hour on IBC 13
- Metro Magazine on IBC 13
- C.U.T.E. (Call Us Two for Entertainment) on IBC 13
- T.O.D.A.S.: Television's Outrageously Delightful Afternoon Show on IBC 13
- Friday Night at the Movies on IBC 13
- Movie Eye on IBC 13
- See True on IBC 13
- Teen Star on IBC 13
- Jai Alai Games on IBC 13
- Communicating with Wilma on IBC 13
- Jimmy Swaggart on IBC 13
- Guni Guni on GMA 7
- Daily Matinee on RPN 9
- Sealab 2020 on RPN 9

== Returning or renamed programs ==
Show	Last aired	Retitled as/Season/Notes	Channel	Return date
Philippine Basketball Association	1979 (season 5: "Invitational championship")	Same (season 6: "Open Conference")	GTV (now MBS)	March 16
Major League Baseball	1979	Same (1980 season)	GTV (now MBS)	April
Philippine Basketball Association	1980 (season 6: "Open Conference")	Same (season 6: "Invitational championship")	GTV (now MBS)	August 16
Philippine Basketball Association	1980 (season 6: "Invitational championship")	Same (season 6: "All-Filipino Conference")	MBS	September
BBC Balita	1980 (BBC)	City2 Balita	City2	Unknown

== Finales ==
=== Unknown ===
- Alindog on BBC 2
- Babae on BBC 2
- BBC Balita on BBC 2
- Karnabal Dos on BBC 2
- In-Daing on BBC 2
- Maria Morena on City2
- The Krofft Supershow on BBC 2
- Lucky Stars on RPN 9
- Barkada sa 9 on RPN 9
- Pipwede on RPN 9
- Dial OCR on RPN 9
- Daily Matinee on RPN 9
- Staying Alive on RPN 9
- Sealab 2020 on RPN 9
- COMELEC Hour on IBC 13
- Metro Magazine on IBC 13
- C.U.T.E. (Call Us Two for Entertainment) on IBC 13
- Friday Night at the Movies on IBC 13
- Paligsahan sa Awit on IBC 13
- Lucky 13 on IBC 13
- Teen Star on IBC 13
- Jai Alai Games on IBC 13
- Communicating with Wilma on IBC 13
- The Jacksons on IBC 13
- News Today on GTV 4
- Musika ng Lahi on MBS 4
- Pilita and Eddie on GMA 7
- Face the Nation on GMA 7
- The Persuaders! on GMA 7

== Channels ==
=== Rebranded ===
The following is a list of television stations that have made or will make noteworthy network rebranded in 1980.

Date	Rebranded from	Rebranded to	Channel
Unknown	BBC	City2	2
Unknown	GTV	MBS	4

== Births ==
- January 15 – Sam Oh, TV host and radio DJ
- January 16 – Drew Arellano, TV host and actor
- February 7 – Adrian Alandy, actor
- February 8 – Jenny Miller, Canadian-Filipino actress
- March 1 – Cassandra Ponti, Filipina actress, dancer, and model
- May 13 – Mau Marcelo, singer and winner of Philippine Idol
- July 6 – JB Magsaysay, actor, businessman and politician
- August 2 – Dingdong Dantes, Filipino actor
- August 17 – Tootsie Guevarra
- October 1 – Phoemela Baranda, TV host
- October 6 – LJ Moreno, actress
- December 2 – Thor Dulay, singer

== See also ==
- 1980 in television
