= 1983 in Philippine television =

The following is a list of events affecting Philippine television in 1983. Events listed include television show debuts, finales, cancellations, and channel launches, closures and rebrandings, as well as information about controversies and carriage disputes.

== Events ==
- August 31: GMA News Digest airs a brief special report regarding the Funeral of Ninoy Aquino in Metro Manila that day, it is the network's first act of defiance of its news division against the Marcos presidency.

== Premieres ==
Date	Show	Refs
January 1	Little House: A New Beginning on GMA 7	
February 13	Ang Iglesia ni Cristo on MBS 4/RPN 9/City2	
April 25	Yagit on GMA 7	

=== Unknown ===
- Blu: Bernardo, Lorenzo, Ulysses on City2
- The Big, Big Show on City2
- Gulong ng Palad on City2
- Jessie on City2
- Seeing Stars with Joe Quirino on City2
- Julian Talisman on RPN 9
- Tell the People on RPN 9
- Church of God on RPN 9
- Island Life on RPN 9
- Life on Earth on RPN 9
- Olympic Library on RPN 9
- Paglipas ng Panahon on RPN 9
- Tell The People on RPN 9
- Sesame! on RPN 9
- Ang Dating Daan on IBC 13
- Sunvulcan on RPN 9
- Salamin ng Buhay on IBC 13
- Ringside at Elorde on IBC 13
- This is It! on IBC 13
- Gideon 300 on IBC 13
- Mga Alagad ni Kalantiao on GMA 7
- Cafeteria Aroma (3rd incarnation) on GMA 7
- Geebees Sine TV Balita on GMA 7
- Stop, Look & Listen on GMA 7
- The A-Team on GMA 7
- Knight Rider on GMA 7
- Family Ties on GMA 7
- The Bob Stewart Show on GMA 7
- Pasikatan sa Siete on GMA 7
- Philippines for Jesus Presents on GMA 7
- Stop, Look, & Listen (2nd incarnation) on GMA 7
- Saturday Matinee on GMA 7
- Christ is the Answer on GMA 7
- The Rev. Ernest Angley Hour on GMA 7
- It's a Real Deal on MBS 4
- Pira-pirasong Pangarap on MBS 4
- Love, Lea on MBS 4
- Ito-Iyon: Ang Galing! on MBS 4
- Let's Go on MBS 4

== Returning or renamed programs ==
Show	Last aired	Retitled as/Season/Notes	Channel	Return date
Philippine Basketball Association	1982 (season 8: "Open Conference")	Same (season 9: "All-Filipino Conference")	City2	March 6
Major League Baseball	1982	Same (1983 season)	MBS	April
Philippine Basketball Association	1983 (season 9: "All-Filipino Conference")	Same (season 9: "Reinforced Filipino Conference")	City2	May 15
Philippine Basketball Association	1983 (season 9: "Reinforced Filipino Conference")	Same (season 9: "Open Conference")	City2	August 28
Cafeteria Aroma	1979 (RPN)	Same (3rd incarnation)	GMA	Unknown
Gulong ng Palad	1981	Same	City2	Unknown
Stop, Look, & Listen	1972 (ABS-CBN)	Same (2nd incarnation)	GMA	Unknown

== Programs transferring networks ==
Date	Show	No. of seasons	Moved from	Moved to
Unknown	Cafeteria Aroma	—N/a	RPN	GMA
Unknown	Gulong ng Palad	—N/a	RPN	City2
Unknown	Stop, Look, & Listen	—N/a	ABS-CBN (now City2)	GMA

== Finales ==
- December 1: PBA on Vintage Sports on City2

=== Unknown ===
- Flordeluna: Book 1 on RPN 9
- Gulong ng Buhay on RPN 9
- Big Ike's Happening on RPN 9
- Dance 10 on RPN 9
- Helpline sa 9 on RPN 9
- Joey and Son on RPN 9
- Tambakan Alley on RPN 9
- Fight Night on RPN 9
- RPN Sports Library on RPN 9
- Sunvulcan on RPN 9
- It's a Real Deal on MBS 4
- The Other Side of Alma on MBS 4
- Pira-pirasong Pangarap on MBS 4
- Cheers on MBS 4
- Chat Silayan Drama Studio on GMA 7
- M*A*S*H on GMA 7
- Battle Fever J on City2
- The New Adventures of Superman on City2

== Births ==
- January 3 – Precious Lara Quigaman, actress, endorser, and beauty queen
- February 28 – Assunta De Rossi, actress and model
- March 11 – Bianca Gonzalez, TV host and model
- June 24 – John Lloyd Cruz, actor, model, and TV host
- July 27 – AJ Dee, Filipino actor
- August 10 - Mark Bautista, singer and actor
- September 9 – Kristine Hermosa, actress
- September 17 – Ice Seguerra, actor and songwriter
- October 25 - Elizalde Kid Camaya, Broadcaster and TV Personality (former actor and singer)

== See also ==
- 1983 in television
