= 2027 in Philippine television =

The following is a list of events affecting Philippine television in 2027. Events listed include television show debuts, finales, cancellations, and channel launches, closures and rebrandings, as well as information about controversies and carriage disputes.

== Events ==
=== Upcoming ===
==== January ====
- January 15 – Mega Manila's analog television stations are set to shut-off as it will fully migrate to digital television.
- January 26 – Sky Cable will celebrate its 35th anniversary of service provider formation.
- January 29 – iBilib celebrated its 15th anniversary on Philippine television.

==== March ====
- March 2 – TV Patrol will celebrate its 40th anniversary as the longest-running newscast on Philippine television since it premiered in 1987.
- March 23 – Pinas Sarap will celebrate its 10th anniversary on Philippine television.

==== April ====
- April 12 – DZMM TeleRadyo will celebrate its 20th anniversary of broadcasting on cable and satellite television.
- April 30 – Daig Kayo ng Lola Ko will celebrate its 10th anniversary on Philippine television.

==== May ====
- May 12 – Star Magic will celebrate its 35th anniversary of talent agency formation.
- May 20 – Tadhana will celebrate its 10th anniversary on Philippine television.

==== June ====
- June 7 – Motoring Today will celebrate its 40th anniversary on Philippine television.

==== July ====
- July 1 – TV5 will celebrate its 65th anniversary of broadcasting as a television network.
- July 10 – Sentro Balita and Ulat Bayan will celebrate its 10th anniversary on Philippine television.
- July 23 – Good Morning Kuya will celebrate its 20th anniversary on Philippine television.

==== October ====
- October 22 – Jeepney TV will celebrate its 15th anniversary of broadcasting on cable and satellite television.
- October 30 – Solar Sports will celebrate its 25th anniversary of broadcasting.

==== November ====
- November 28 – Born to Be Wild will celebrate its 20th anniversary on Philippine television.

==== December ====
- December 2 – Magpakailanman will celebrate its 25th anniversary on Philippine television.

== Debuts ==
=== Major networks ===
==== A2Z ====
The following are programs that debuted on A2Z:

===== No definite date =====
- Bride to Be

==== All TV ====
The following are programs that debuted on All TV:

===== No definite date =====
- Bride to Be

==== GMA ====
The following are programs that debuted on GMA Network:

===== No definite date =====
- A Million Dreams
- A Mother's Tale
- Code Gray
- Hari ng Tondo
- Whispers From Heaven

==== TV5 ====
The following are programs that debuted on TV5:

===== No definite date =====
- Bride to Be
- Gen Ex
- Late Bloomer
- Si Michael at si Jackson
- Sugar Baby: An Anatomy Of An Affair
- The Good Doctor (Philippine adaptation)
- The Jervi Show
- Two Wives One Roof

=== State-owned networks ===
==== PTV ====
The following are programs that debuted on People's Television Network:

==== IBC ====
The following are programs that debuted on IBC:

=== Minor networks ===
The following are the programs that debuted on minor networks:

=== Other channels ===
The following are programs that debuted on other channels:

===== No definite date =====
- Bride to Be on Kapamilya Channel
- Code Gray, Hari ng Tondo and Whispers From Heaven on GTV

==== Re-runs ====
===== Upcoming =====
Notes

1. ^ ^{a} Originally aired on ABS-CBN (now Kapamilya Channel)
2. ^ ^{b} Originally aired on GMA
3. ^ ^{c} Originally aired on TV5
4. ^ ^{d} Originally aired on Cine Mo!
5. ^ ^{e} Originally aired on Yey!
6. ^ ^{f} Originally aired on S+A (now Aliw 23)
7. ^ ^{g} Originally aired on GMA News TV (now GTV)
8. ^ ^{h} Originally aired on Jeepney TV
9. ^ ^{i} Originally aired on Sari-Sari Channel
10. ^ ^{j} Originally aired on Hero
11. ^ ^{k} Originally aired on ETC (now Solar Flix)
12. ^ ^{l} Originally aired on Jack TV
13. ^ ^{m} Originally aired on 2nd Avenue
14. ^ ^{n} Originally aired on CT
15. ^ ^{o} Originally aired on Studio 23 (now Aliw 23)
16. ^ ^{p} Originally aired on Q (now GTV)
17. ^ ^{q} Originally aired on RPN (now RPTV)
18. ^ ^{r} Originally aired on Fox Filipino
19. ^ ^{s} Originally aired on Kapamilya Channel
20. ^ ^{t} Originally aired on Metro Channel
21. ^ ^{u} Originally aired on Asianovela Channel
22. ^ ^{v} Originally aired on PTV
23. ^ ^{w} Originally aired on Knowledge Channel
24. ^ ^{x} Originally aired on CNN Philippines (now RPTV)
25. ^ ^{y} Originally aired on A2Z
26. ^ ^{z} Originally aired on GTV
27. ^ ^{aa} Originally aired on IBC
28. ^ ^{ab} Originally aired on ABC (now TV5)
29. ^ ^{ac} Originally aired on TeleAsia Filipino
30. ^ ^{ad} Originally aired on One Screen
31. ^ ^{ae} Originally aired on Colours
32. ^ ^{af} Originally aired on Solar Flix
33. ^ ^{ag} Originally aired on Heart of Asia Channel
34. ^ ^{ah} Originally aired on PIE Channel
35. ^ ^{ai} Originally aired on All TV
36. ^ ^{aj} Originally aired on One News
37. ^ ^{ak} Originally aired on BuKo Channel
38. ^ ^{al} Originally aired on One PH
39. ^ ^{am} Originally aired on Aliw 23
40. ^ ^{an} Originally aired on Bilyonaryo News Channel

=== Video streaming services ===
The following are programs that debuted on video streaming services:

==== No define date ====
- Behind Closed Doors and Kopino on Amazon Prime Video

== Returning or renamed programs ==
=== Major networks ===
Show	Last aired	Retitled as/Season/Notes	Channel	Return date

=== State-owned networks ===
Show	Last aired	Retitled as/Season/Notes	Channel	Return date

=== Minor networks ===
Show	Last aired	Retitled as/Season/Notes	Channel	Return date

=== Other channels ===
Show	Last aired	Retitled as/Season/Notes	Channel	Return date

=== Video streaming services ===
Show	Last aired	Retitled as/Season/Notes	Service	Return date

== Programs transferring networks ==
=== Major networks ===
Date	Show	No. of seasons	Moved from	Moved to

=== Minor networks ===
Date	Show	No. of seasons	Moved from	Moved to

=== Video streaming services ===
Date	Show	No. of seasons	Moved from	Moved to

== Milestone episodes ==
The following shows made their Milestone episodes in 2027;

Show	Network	Episode #	Episode title	Episode air date
Pinoy Big Brother: Collab 3.0	GMA	100th	"100th Episode"	January 31

== Finales ==
=== Major networks ===
==== A2Z ====
The following are programs that ended on A2Z:

===== Stopped airing =====
Program	Last airing	Resumed airing	Reason

==== All TV ====
The following are programs that ended on All TV:

===== Stopped airing =====
Program	Last airing	Resumed airing	Reason

==== GMA ====
The following are programs that ended on GMA Network:

===== Stopped airing =====
Program	Last airing	Resumed airing	Reason

==== TV5 ====
The following are programs that ended on TV5:

===== Stopped airing =====
Program	Last airing	Resumed airing	Reason

=== State-owned networks ===
==== PTV ====
The following are programs that ended on People's Television Network:

===== Stopped airing =====
Program	Last airing	Resumed airing	Reason

==== IBC ====
The following are programs that ended on IBC:

===== Stopped airing =====
Program	Last airing	Resumed airing	Reason

=== Minor networks ===
The following are programs that ended on minor networks:

==== Stopped airing ====
Program	Channel	Last airing	Resumed airing	Reason

=== Other channels ===
The following are programs that ended on other channels:

==== Scheduled ====
- January 1: When the Sky Falls (rerun) on Heart of Asia
- January 1: Aryana (rerun) and Starla (rerun) on Jeepney TV
- January 8: Bagito (rerun) and The Good Son (rerun) on Jeepney TV
- January 15: Dream Dad (rerun) on Jeepney TV
- January 16: Midnight Museum on GTV
- January 22: Love Between Fairy and Moon Supreme (rerun) on Heart of Asia
- January 23: Sa Piling Mo (rerun) on Jeepney TV
- January 29: To the Moon and Back on Heart of Asia
- February 5: You Touched My Heart on Heart of Asia
- February 26: Precious Hearts Romances Presents: Los Bastardos (rerun) on Jeepney TV
- February 28: Labs Ko si Babe on Jeepney TV
- March 5: Since I Found You (rerun) on Jeepney TV
- April 16: Imortal (rerun) and The Better Half (rerun) on Jeepney TV

===== Stopped airing =====
Program	Channel	Last airing	Resumed airing	Reason

== Networks ==
The following are a list of free-to-air and cable channels or networks launches and closures in 2027.

=== Launches ===
Date	Station	Type	Channel	Source

=== Rebranded ===
Date	Rebranded from	Rebranded to	Type	Channel	Source

=== Closures ===
Date	Station	Type	Channel	Sign-on debut	Source

== Services ==
The following are a list of television operators or providers and streaming media platforms or services launches and closures in 2027.

=== Launches ===
Date	Provider	Type	Stream	Source

=== Rebranded ===
The following is a list of streaming providers that have made or will make noteworthy service rebrands in 2027.

Date	Rebranded from	Rebranded to	Type	Stream	Source

=== Closures ===
Date	Provider	Type	Sign-on debut	Stream	Source

== See also ==
- 2027 in television
