= Die Leute vom Domplatz =

- Country of origin: Germany

Die Leute vom Domplatz (German for "The people of the cathedral square") is a German television series that began production in 1979. The series depicts the life in a medieval German city of the 13th century as realistically as possible. The 13 episodes tell the daily life of the people and the construction of the cathedral.

The DVD Box was released on Amazon's German website on 30 March 2012, only available in German.

== See also ==
- List of German television series
