= 1993 in Philippine television =

The following is a list of events effecting Philippine television in 1993. Events listed include television show debuts, finales, cancellations, and channel launches, closures and rebrandings, as well as information about controversies and carriage disputes.

== Event ==
- February 21 - The Associated Broadcasting Company (ABC-5) celebrated their 1st anniversary as a broadcasting company. The network launched new provincial stations in key cities across the Philippines.
- March 1 - GMA Network celebrated their 43rd anniversary with a new programming schedule launched.
- October 23 - ABS-CBN celebrated its 40th anniversary of Philippine television. The Sarimanok Station ID was also unveiled during the month.
- October 31 - Radio Mindanao Network became the second radio-based network to launch a TV network called Cinema Television Channel 31 (CTV-31) through its flagship station, DWKC-TV. RMN thus becomes also the second national UHF TV network in the nation to begin operations.
- November 26 - ABS-CBN hosts a special 40th anniversary gala special in the Coconut Palace in Manila as the highlights for its celebrations of the 40th anniversary of Philippine television, President Fidel V. Ramos is guest of honor and keynote speaker in this nighttime gala.

== Premieres ==
Date	Show
February 18	Star Drama Presents on ABS-CBN 2
March 16	Boracay on New Vision 9
March 20	SST: Salo-Salo Together on GMA 7
March 28	Parker Lewis Can't Lose on New Vision 9
April 12	Lifestyle of the Rich and Pinoys on New Vision 9
April 26	T.O.D.A.S. Again on IBC 13
May 2	L.A. Law on New Vision 9
May 10	Haybol Rambol on GMA 7
May 31	Catwalk on New Vision 9
June 19	Love Notes on ABC 5
July 6	Noli Me Tangere on ABC 5
July 7	Isang Tanong, Isang Sagot! on ABC 5
July 19	Kate en Boogie on GMA 7
September 6	Maayong Buntag Mindanao on ABS-CBN TV-4 Davao
September 7	Action Theater on ABC 5
September 25	Rated PB: Pugad Baboy sa TV on GMA 7
October 23	Oki Doki Doc on ABS-CBN 2
December 5	Brigada Siete on GMA 7

=== Unknown date ===
- January: Action 9 on New Vision 9

=== Unknown ===
- Mana-Mana on ABS-CBN 2
- Yan ang Bata on ABS-CBN 2
- IBC Love Stories on IBC 13
- Oras ng Katotohanan on IBC 13
- Bistromania on RJTV 29
- Vina on ABC 5
- We R Family on ABC 5
- Tondominium on ABC 5
- Mysteries 2000 on ABC 5
- Nap Knock on ABC 5
- Movies to Watch on ABC 5
- Mag-Agri Tayo on PTV 4
- Bioman on IBC 13
- Candy Crush on ABS-CBN 2
- Dance Upon a Time with Becky Garcia on RJTV 29
- GMA Telesine Specials on GMA 7
- Winspector on IBC 13

== Programs transferring networks ==
Date	Show	Moved from	Moved to
October	Martin Nievera After Dark	GMA Network	ABS-CBN (retitle as "Martin After Dark")

== Finales ==
- March 19: Lunch Date on GMA 7
- March 21: Austin City Limits on New Vision 9
- March 22:
  - IBC News Magazine on IBC 13
  - Music Never Stops on IBC 13
- April 27: Cebu on New Vision 9
- September 28: Noli Me Tangere on ABC 5
- October 10: Gwapings Live! on GMA 7
- December 3: Kape at Balita on GMA 7

=== Unknown ===
- Japayuki on ABS-CBN 2
- Mga Lihim ng Ermita on ABS-CBN 2
- Nora on ABS-CBN 2
- Mana on ABS-CBN 2
- Mana-Mana on ABS-CBN 2
- Options on ABS-CBN 2
- International News Report on IBC 13
- Export... Made in the Philippines on IBC 13
- IBC Love Stories on IBC 13
- Four Da Boys on IBC 13
- Tanghalan ng Kampeon on GMA 7
- Yan ang Bata on GMA 7
- Yan si Mommy on GMA 7
- Gideon 300 on GMA 7
- Merry Monday Specials on GMA 7
- Movies to Watch on GMA 7
- Daimos on GMA 7
- Mag-Asawa'y Di Biro on New Vision 9
- Quantum Leap on ABC 5
- PTV Weekend Report on PTV 4
- Tinig Bayan on PTV 4
- T.O.D.A.S. Again on IBC 13

== Channels ==
=== Launches ===
- October 31: CTV 31 (now BEAM TV)

==== Unknown dates ====
- May: RJTV 29

== Births ==
- January 4 – Marlo Mortel, actor and singer
- January 17 – Ken Chan, actor and singer
- January 20 – Meg Imperial, actress
- January 25 – Kylie Padilla, Filipino-Australian actress and singer
- February 11 – Marlann Flores, actress
- February 12 – Shey Bustamante, actress
- February 17 – AJ Perez, actor (d. 2011)
- February 19 – Empress Schuck, actress
- April 13 – Juancho Trivino, actor
- April 16 – Ann B. Mateo, actress and commercial model
- April 17 – Lauren Reid, actress and commercial model
- April 24 - Pocholo Bismonte, actor and singer
- May 4 - Joyce Pring, radio and television host
- May 11 – James Reid, actor and singer
- May 20 – Devon Seron, actress
- June 29 – Micaella Ilao, news reporter
- September 29 – Teejay Marquez, actor
- October 9 –
  - Sarah Lahbati, actress
  - Jhoana Marie Tan, actress
- October 12 – Carl John Barrameda, actor
- October 16 - Jovit Baldivino, singer, actor (d. 2022)
- October 31 – Nadine Lustre, singer, actress
- November 4 – Moira Dela Torre, singer
- November 7 - Hiro Peralta, actor
- November 8 – Lauren Young, Filipino-American actress
- November 12 – EJ Jallorina, actor
- December 8 – Yamyam Gucong

== See also ==
- 1993 in television
