= Familie Meier =

- Country of origin: Germany

Production
- Camera setup: Peter Ambach

Original release
- Release: 5 October 1980

Familie Meier is a German television series. After the six-part Zeit genug, Familie Meier was Bogner's first long-term pre-evening series. He established himself in this genre, which until then had been occupied solely by Helmut Dietl. Cult series such as Irgendwie und Sowieso, Zur Freiheit, Café Meineid and München 7 followed.

== See also ==
- List of German television series
