= 1980 in Dutch television =

This is a list of Dutch television related events from 1980.

== Events ==
- 1 April – The NOS officially begins airing Teletext
- 19 April – The 25th Eurovision Song Contest is held at the Congresgebouw in The Hague. Ireland wins the contest with the song "What's Another Year", performed by Johnny Logan.

== Debuts ==
- 22 October - De Familie Knots
- 29 October De Poppenkraam

== Television shows ==
=== 1950s ===
- NOS Journaal (1956–present)

=== 1970s ===
- Sesamstraat (1976–present)

== Ending this year ==
- Pipo de Clown (1958–1980)

== Births ==
- 6 August – Hélène Hendriks, television presenter
- 28 September – Leonie ter Braak, actress and television presenter
- 1 October – Kim-Lian van der Meij, actress, TV presenter & singer-songwriter
