= 1983 in Scottish television =

This is a list of events in Scottish television from 1983.

== Events ==
=== January ===
- 17 January – Breakfast Time, Britain's first breakfast show, launches on BBC1. The new service includes four opt-outs, which allow BBC Scotland to broadcast its own news bulletin.

=== February ===
- 1 February – TV-am launches, with Good Morning Britain. However this is a national service with no opt-outs for Scottish news.

=== May ===
- After 15 years on air, the final edition of current affairs programme Current Account is broadcast on BBC1 Scotland.

=== June ===
- 9–10 June – Television coverage of the 1983 general election.

=== September ===
- 6 September – ITV broadcasts the STV-produced Killer. It would later be turned into a series and re-titled Taggart.

=== October ===
- 24 October – Sixty Minutes launches on BBC1, replacing Nationwide, and the Reporting Scotland name is dropped, becoming Scotland Sixty Minutes due to the regional news programmes being incorporated into the new programme.

== Debuts ==
=== ITV ===
- 6 September – Taggart (1983–2010)

== Television series ==
- Scotsport (1957–2008)
- Top Club (1971–1998)
- Scotland Today (1972–2009)
- Sportscene (1975–present)
- The Beechgrove Garden (1978–present)
- Grampian Today (1980–2009)
- Take the High Road (1980–2003)
- Now You See It (1981–1986)

== Ending this year ==
- 21 October – Reporting Scotland (1968–1983; 1984–present)

== Births ==
- March – Mark Prendergast, actor

== See also ==
- 1983 in Scotland
