= Danny Webb (camera operator) =

American cinematographer (1952–2026)

- Born: Danny Joseph Webb; November 21, 1952
- Died: June 30, 2026 (aged 73)
- Occupations: Camera operator, cinematographer

Danny Joseph Webb (November 21, 1952 – June 30, 2026) was an American camera operator and cinematographer. He won seven Primetime Emmy Awards and was nominated for twenty more in the category Outstanding Technical Direction and Camerawork.

Webb died on June 30, 2026, at the age of 73.
