= Damayan =

Filipino current affairs talk show

- Genre: Talk show, Public service, Telethon
- Created by: ABS-CBN Corporation; Government Television
- Developed by: ABS-CBN News and Current Affairs; Government Television; Philippine Red Cross
- Presented by: Rosa Rosal (1969-1972, 1975-2010); William Thio (2007-2010; 2017-2019); Emilie Katigbak (2017-2019)
- Theme music composer: Paul de Senneville
- Opening theme: "Mariage d'amour" by Richard Clayderman
- Country of origin: Philippines
- Original language: Filipino

Production
- Running time: 60 minutes

Original release
- Network: ABS-CBN
- Release: October 20, 1969 – September 21, 1972
- Network: GTV/MBS/NBN/PTV
- Release: December 1, 1975 – November 20, 2010
- Release: October 6, 2017 – 2020

Related
- Kapwa Ko Mahal Ko (GMA) (1975–present)

Damayan Ngayon, also known as Damayan, is a Philippine television public service show broadcast by ABS-CBN, GTV, MBS, NBN and PTV. Originally hosted by Rosa Rosal, it aired from October 20, 1969 to September 21, 1972. The show returned from December 1, 1975 to November 20, 2010 and from October 6, 2017 to 2020. William Thio and Emilie Katigbak serves as the final hosts.

Rosal decided to revive her old show on GMA. Damayan once again premiered in the same year on GTV Channel 4 (which later became MBS, PTV and NBN) to provide humanitarian work through national television, together with her co-host William Thio.

At the same time, Rosal hosted a drama anthology Ulila on government-owned network BBC (now ALLTV2) from 1976 to 1980, and Kapwa Ko Mahal Ko on GMA—these particular shows earned Rosal numerous citations such as the Ramon Magsaysay Award for Public Service in 1999, Order of the Golden Heart in 2006, and the Ading Fernando Lifetime Achievement Award in the 22nd PMPC Star Awards for TV.

After 35 continuous years on the airwaves, Rosal announced that she would be leaving the show. It ended on November 20, 2010.

== Concept and legacy ==
Damayan featured mostly doctors and other personalities to discuss advancements in health and public service. It also hosted telethons to provide financial aid to those who are in need such as typhoon victims, those with no medical assistance and others.

== Hosts ==
- Rosa Rosal (1969–1972; 1975–2010)
- Diane Querrer (Bayanihan Center) (2017–2018)

== See also ==
- List of programs broadcast by ABS-CBN
- List of programs broadcast by People's Television Network
