= Pangunahing Balita =

Philippine television news broadcasting show

- Genre: News program Live action
- Starring: See anchors
- Opening theme: We're on Your Side (Fast Breaking News Theme) (PTV)
- Country of origin: Philippines
- Original language: Tagalog
- No. of episodes: n/a (airs daily)

Production
- Production locations: PTV 4: PTV Newscenter, Broadcast Center, Quezon City (1988–92); PTV 4 Studio A, Quezon City (1992–98)
- Running time: 15-30 minutes (1962–72, 1987–98)
- Production companies: ABC News and Public Affairs; PTV News

Original release
- Network: ABC
- Release: July 1962 – September 22, 1972
- Network: PTV
- Release: October 26, 1987 – July 31, 1998

Pangunahing Balita (lit. 'Headliner') is a Philippine television news broadcasting show broadcast by ABC and PTV. It premiered in July 1962 and concluded on ABC on September 22, 1972. The show returned on October 26, 1987, on PTV replacing Early Evening Report. The show concluded on July 31, 1998, it was replaced by Pambansang Balita Ala-Sais in its timeslot.

== History ==
=== 1962–1972; ABC 5 ===
Premiered in July 1962, Pangunahing Balita was the first Filipino-language late afternoon newscast of ABC 5 (now TV5). Anchored by Paul Lacanilao, the newscast aired the news of the day in the local and international scene. It also inspired other TV stations to introduce a Filipino-language newscast, for example Balita Ngayon of ABS-CBN, which aired from 1967 to 1972. On September 22, 1972, DZTM-TV 5 was closed down due to declaration of martial law.

==== Timeslot ====
It was aired in the late afternoon slot, and had 2 editions. The first edition aired at 4:30 pm, while the final edition aired at 5:45 pm.

=== 1987–1998; PTV 4 ===
In 1987, PTV 4 launched Pangunahing Balita as its Filipino-language newscast. The noontime program became the household name for their Tagalog newscast.

== Anchors ==
- Paul Lacanilao (ABC 5) (1962–72)
- Erwin Tulfo (PTV 4) (1987–95)
- Elmer Mercado (PTV 4) (1990–95)
- Alice Noel (PTV 4) (1990–95)
- Cristy Dailo (1987–92)
- Katherine De Leon-Vilar (PTV 4) (1992–95)
- Daniel Razon (PTV 4) (1995–97)
- Dada Lorenzana (PTV 4) (1995–98)

== See also ==
- List of programs aired by TV5 (Philippine TV network)
- List of programs aired by People's Television Network
