= Satellite television by region =

Satellite television varies in the different regions around the world.

== Africa ==
Satellite television has been far more successful in Africa than cable, primarily because the infrastructure for cable television does not exist and would be expensive to install owing to the living style of most Africans who live in rural areas. Furthermore, maintaining a cable network is expensive due to the need to cover larger and more sparsely populated areas though there are some terrestrial pay-TV and MMDS services.

The launch of Free2view made satellite TV available to the masses in Africa.

=== Angola ===
In 2010, ZAP launched in Angola, providing digital satellite television on Eutelsat 36D mainly for Portuguese speaking countries in sub-Saharan Africa and DStv Bue of Portuguese stations.

=== Francophonie ===
Canal+ Afrique, owned by France's Canal+, is the main provider in French-speaking Africa on Satellite SES-4 (22.0 W).

Francophonie consists country of: Democratic Republic of the Congo, Cameroon, Ivory Coast, Burkina Faso, Senegal, Benin, Guinea, Mali, Togo, Republic of the Congo, Niger, Chad, Gabon, Central African Republic, Burundi, Rwanda, Mauritania, Djibouti.

=== Ghana ===
On satellite Astra 28.2°E, SES, HD+ Ghana, GTV (Gateway TV) - to differentiate from Ghana Television (GTV)-, a British-based company, became the next contender in sub-saharan Africa providing digital satellite television. But on 30 January. 2009, the Board of Directors of Gateway Broadcast Services (GBS) approved plans to liquidate the company which was later shut down. GBS was the operator behind GTV, a popular, if niche Direct to Home (DTH) satellite Pay-TV service present in 22 African markets. The collapse of GBS was sudden for its employees, its customers and those who have long believed that there is mass-market potential in African pay-TV.

=== Kenya ===
The Wananchi Group of Zuku TV consists of 5 countries, Kenya, Malawi, Tanzania, Uganda, Zambia on satellite SES 5, the StarSat on Sub-Saharan African region and StarTimes and Free-to-air channel on satellite Eutelsat 10B.

=== Mozambique ===
The satellite Eutelsat 3B, and StarTimes and TMT mainly for Portuguese speaking African and satellite Eutelsat 36D of DStv Bue of Portuguese stations and ZAP, the satellite Intelsat 22 at 72e, MultiChoice's DTT- Terrestrial of GOtv Africa is transmits on satellite channels of portuguese.

=== Namibia ===
The Satelio, German speaking countries in sub-Saharan Africa on satellite Astra 4A.

=== Nigeria ===
Traditionally DStv Africa satellite on Eutelsat 36C/D had held a large market share in Nigeria's Satellite television sector but several companies, HiTV, MyTV, Trend TV, ACTV, Consat, Daarsat, Metrodigital, Montage cable network and StarTimes DTT, a Chinese company which launched in 2009 has managed to reach about 800,000 households in October 2011.

=== Réunion ===
Canal+ Réunion owned by France's Canal+ Groups and Vivendi, is the main provider in French-speaking for east african region and fr: Parabole Réunion on satellite Eutelsat 16A. Another entrant into the satellite television circuit in Africa is MyTv Africa has been defunct since 2023, and product subsidiary of Dubai-based Strong Technologies.

Francophonie consists country of East Africa: Madagascar, Mauritius, Réunion, Comoros, Mayotte, Seychelles.

=== South Africa ===
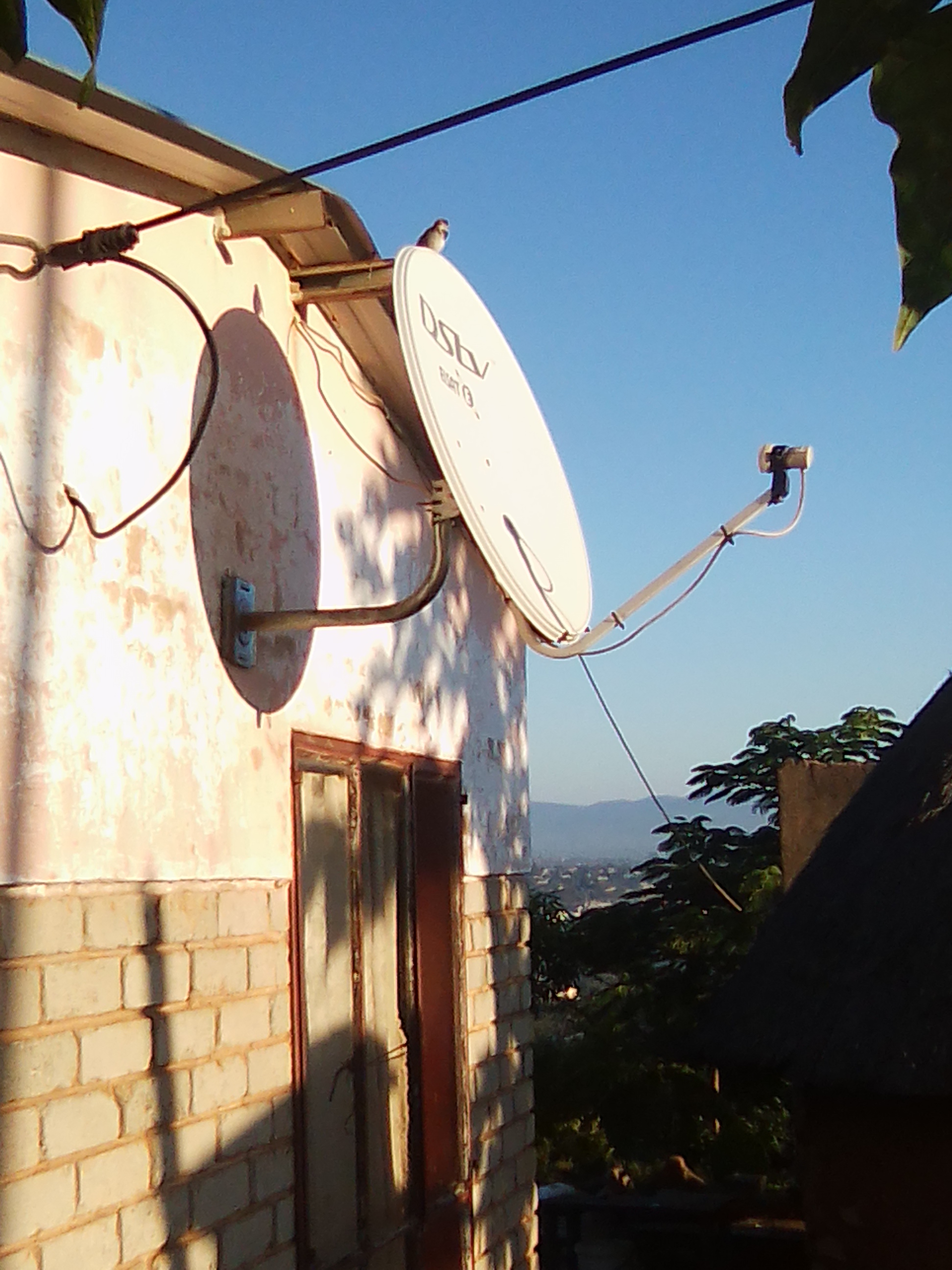
DStv dish

The Intelsat 20/36, served by Multichoice's DStv is the main digital satellite television provider in South Africa and sub-Saharan Africa, broadcasting principally in English, but also in Portuguese, and Afrikaans. Multichoice's DStv had 6 million paid subscribers on 30 September 2016.

The Free-to-air eMedia Investments as of 2023, OpenView HD is available in more than 3 million households.

While StarSat is operated by On Digital Media, about 500,000 households in October 2024 in South Africa. served sub-Saharan Africa on satellite SES 5.

Astra 4A served German speaking for Deukom South Africa and sub-Saharan Africa of Satelio.

=== Sudan ===
Sudan TV, the government-owned national network, is available by satellite as well as broadcast.

=== Tanzania ===
On satellite Eutelsat 7C, Azam TV and, the Bakhresa Group consists of 6 country Kenya, Malawi, Rwanda, Tanzania, Uganda, Zimbabwe and satellite Eutelsat 36C/D, of DStv Africa, and satellite on SES 5 on DTH StarSat and DTT StarTimes, and offered used by the Wananchi Group of Zuku, On satellite ABS-2 74.9°E the Continental, Agape (Ting), and DiGitek are the satellite television service provider in Tanzania, East Africa. They offer a range of satellite TV channels and packages to subscribers, including sports, entertainment, news, and more.

=== Togo ===
On satellite Eutelsat 16A, New World TV for the French-speaking, sub-Saharan Africa region.

=== Zambia ===
On satellite Eutelsat 8 West B, Free-to-air channel and Topstar from StarTimes. the StarSat and the Wananchi Group of Zuku TV on satellite SES 5 and satellite Intelsat 20/36, of DStv of Southern African region.

== America ==
=== Canada ===
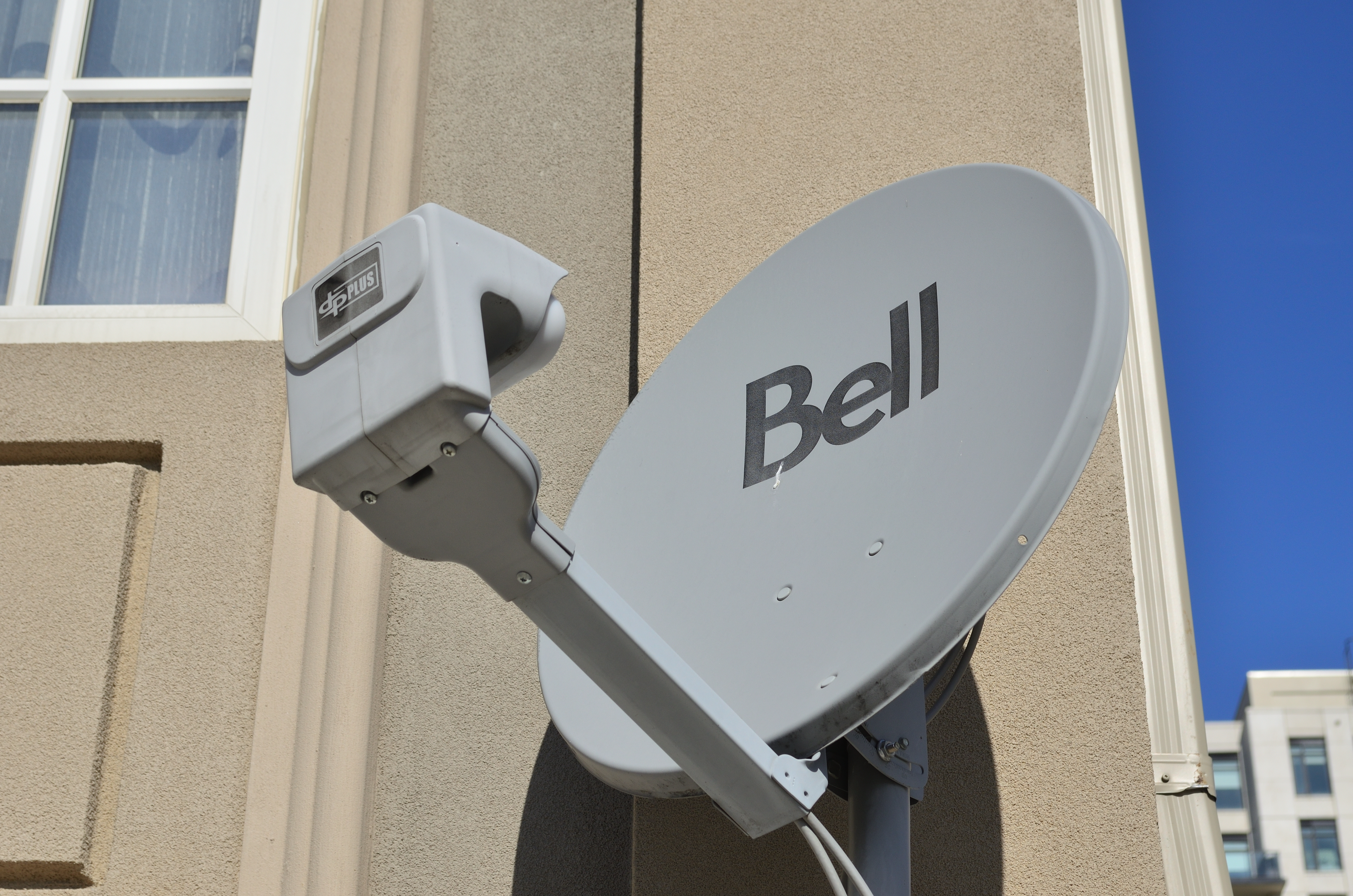
Bell TV dish

Currently, there are two primary satellite television providers of subscription based service available to Canadian consumers: Bell Satellite TV and Shaw Direct. The CRTC has refused to license American satellite services, but nonetheless hundreds of thousands (up to a million by some estimates) of Canadians access or have accessed American services — usually these services have to be billed to an American address and are paid for in U.S. dollars, although some viewers receive American signals through "pirate decryption". Whether such activity is grey market or black market is the source of often heated debate between those who would like greater choice and those who argue that the protection of Canadian firms and Canadian culture is more important. In October 2004, Quebec Judge Danièle Côté ruled Canada's Radiocommunication Act to be in direct violation of the Canadian Charter of Rights and Freedoms, in so far as it bans reception of unlicensed foreign television services. The judgment gave the federal government a one-year deadline to remedy this breach of the Constitution. However, this contradicts prior Supreme Court of Canada decisions and was overturned on appeal. A Supreme Court of Canada decision in the case of Bell ExpressVu v. Richard Rex, made on 26 April 2002, confirms that provisions in the Radiocommunication Act forbid the illegal decoding of satellite television programming.

Although there are no official statistics, the use of American satellite services in Canada appears to be declining as of 2004. Some would claim that this is probably due to a combination of increasingly aggressive police enforcement and an unfavourable exchange rate between the Canadian and U.S. currencies. As the U.S. dollar has been declining as of 2005 versus other international currencies, the decline in DirecTV viewership in Canada may well be related not to a cost difference as much as to the series of smart card swaps which have rendered the first three generations of DirecTV access cards (F, H and HU) all obsolete. Bell underwent a period of phasing out satellite receivers in urban areas, replacing it with IPTV transmitted over regular telephone lines.

=== Brazil ===
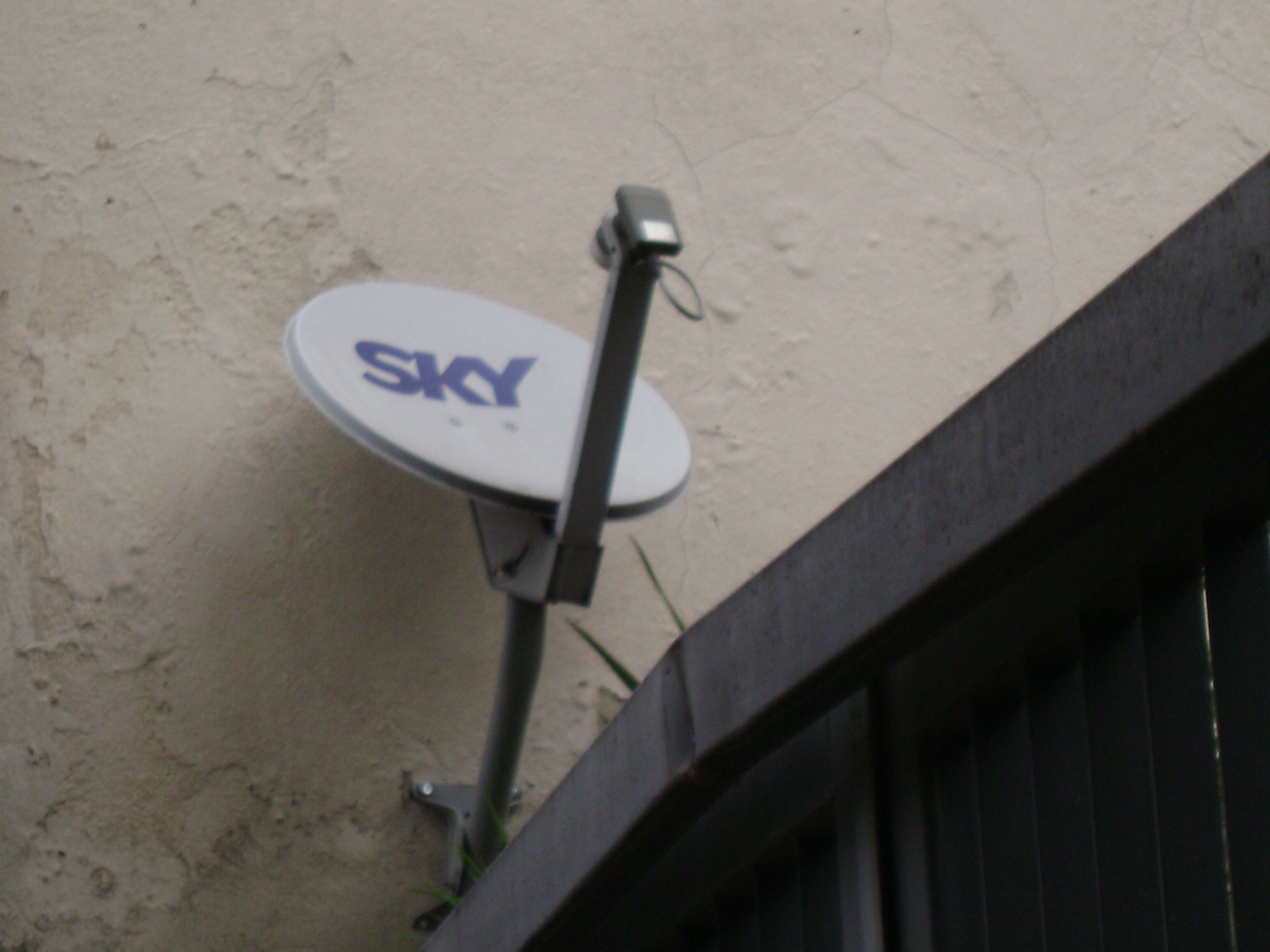
Sky Brasil satellite

There are about 10 million subscribers of satellite TV in Brazil; the main satellite system is SKY Brasil with approximately 1.4 million subscribers; other satellite TV operators are Vivo TV, Claro TV and Oi TV. A major problem are pirate receivers (usually using card sharing systems to cheat the conditional access systems) which amount to an unknown quantity of users.

The service offered in Brazil includes Digital TV with full Dolby Digital surround support, mts and multiple subtitle options, a first for the Brazilian market. A recent update to Sky's services in Brazil is Sky+ which allows the customer to record a program while watching another one and also Sky HD which currently provides up to 29 high definition channels. Services are however relatively expensive, therefore market penetration is still limited.

=== Chile ===
There are several satellite providers in Chile. The main ones are listed below:

1. DirecTV
2. Movistar TV
3. Claro TV
4. TuVes HD
5. Entel (Chile)

=== Mexico ===
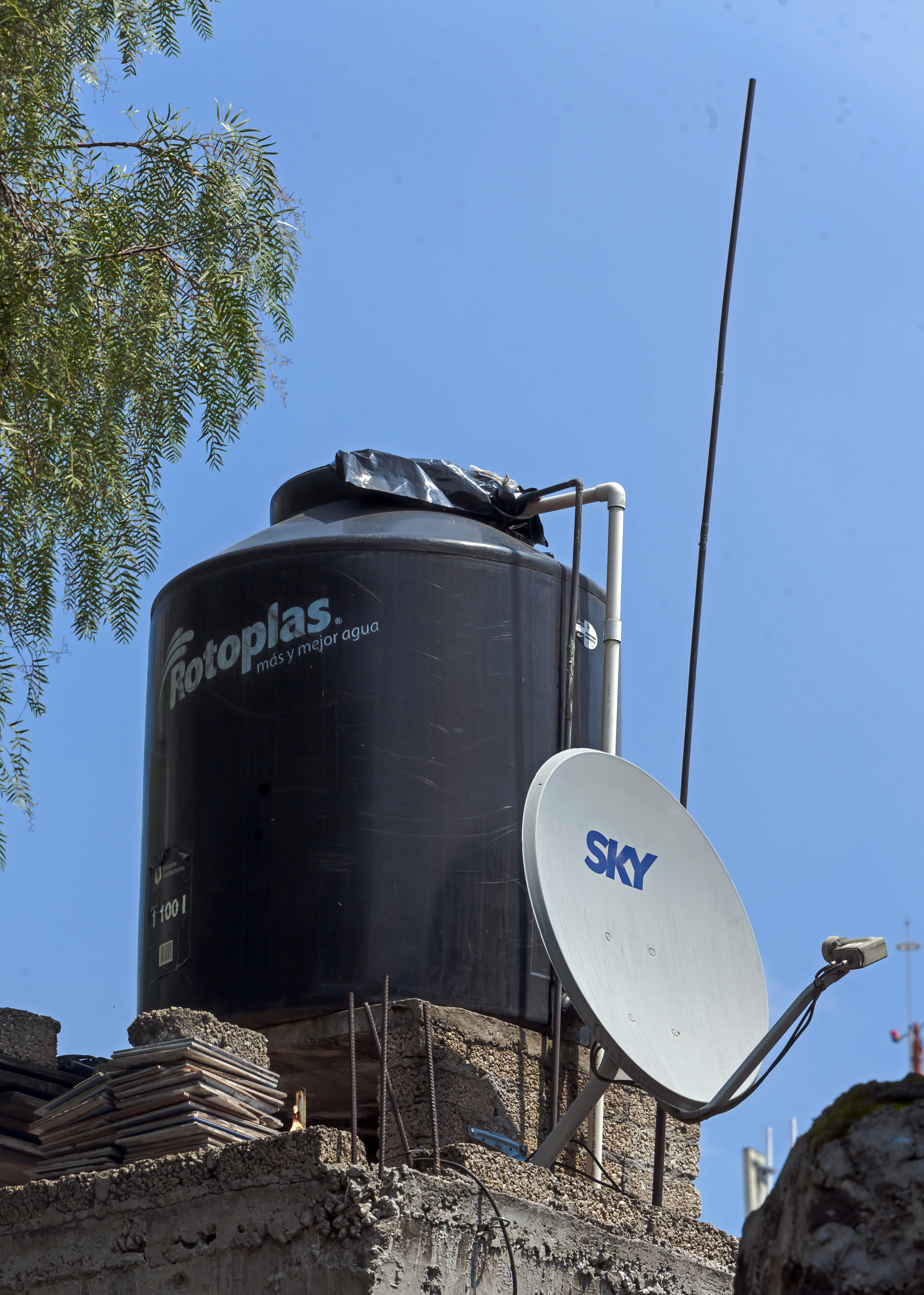
Sky Mexico dish

Hispanic America's main satellite systems are SKY México with 3 million subscribers and Dish México with 2.2 million subscribers and Vrio, which provides service to the rest of the Americas, with a total of approximately 1.3 million subscribers.

=== United States ===
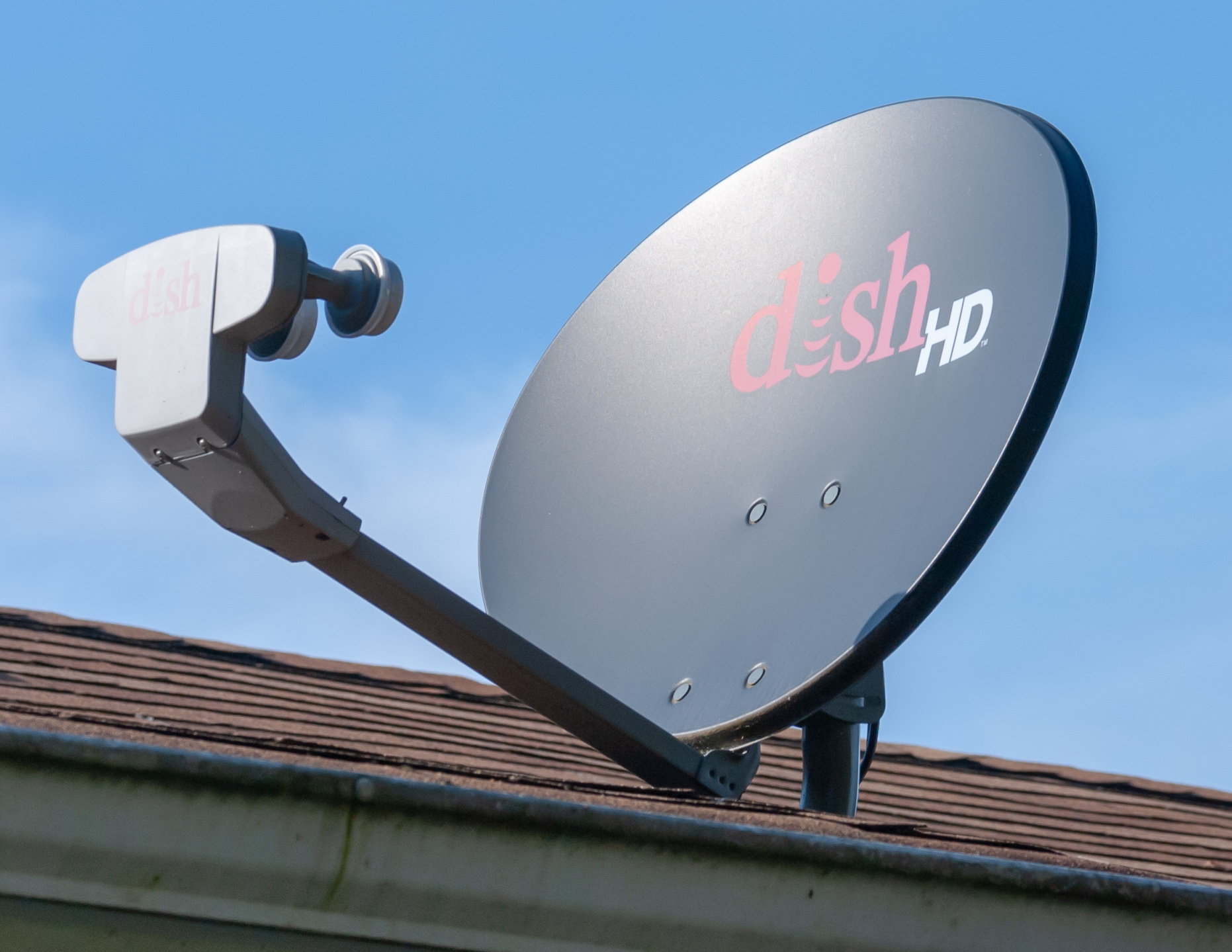
Dish Network

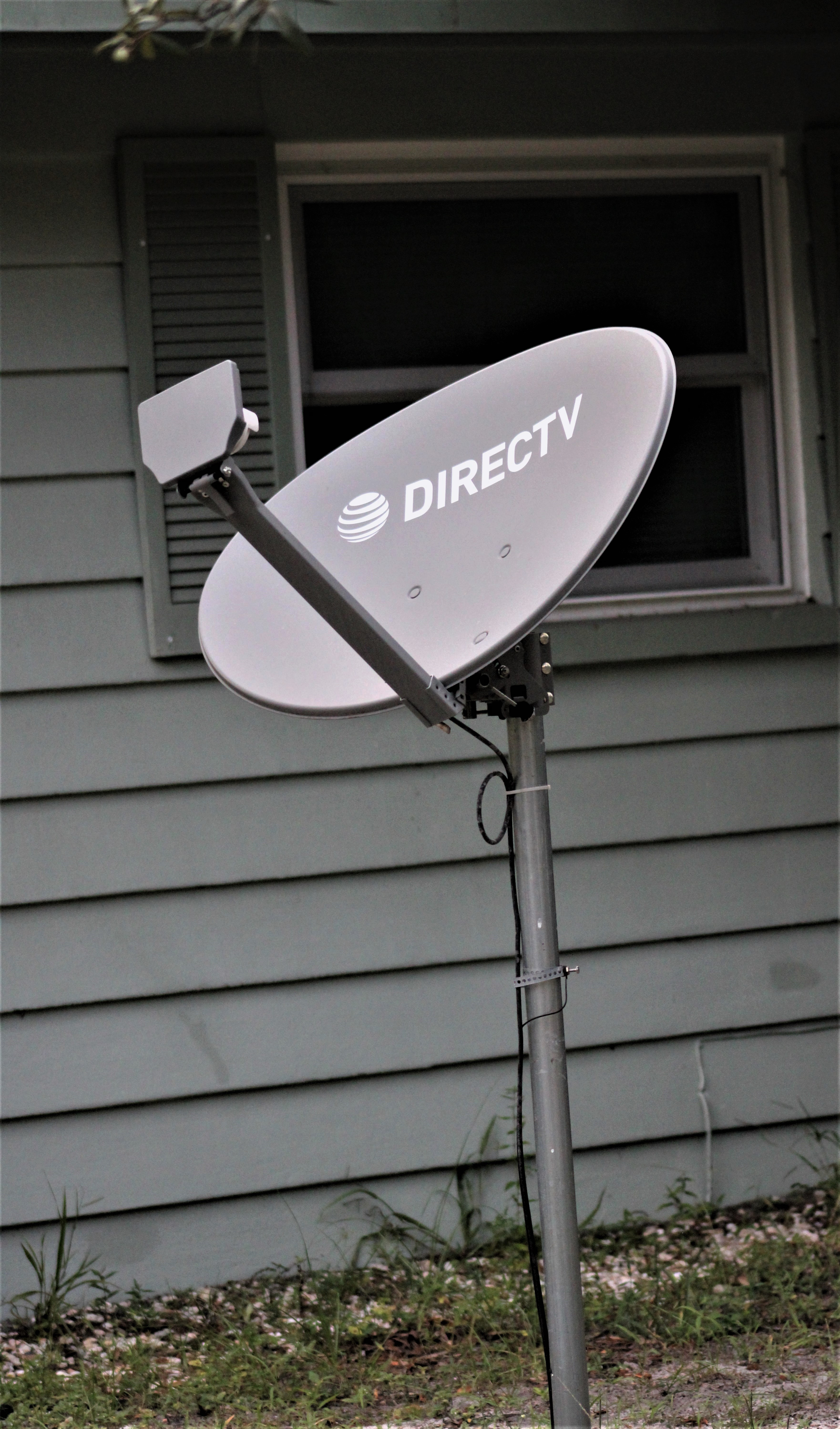
Direct tv antenna

Currently, there are two primary satellite television providers of subscription based service available to United States consumers: DirecTV positions ranging from Galaxy 3C, 95°W to EchoStar XIV, 119°W, EchoStar, and Dish Network.

== Asia ==
=== Bangladesh ===
All privately owned television channels in Bangladesh broadcast via satellite television, and terrestrial television signals are only used by state-owned Bangladesh Television. There is only one satellite providers in Bangladesh, Akash DTH.

=== India ===
Over 1340 TV Satellite channels are broadcast in India. This includes channels from the state-owned Doordarshan, News Corporation owned STAR TV, Sony owned Sony Entertainment Television, Sun Network and Zee TV. Major satellite television providers in India are DD Free Dish, Dish TV, Airtel digital TV, Reliance Digital TV, Videocon d2h, Sun Direct and Tata Play. Most of them have already started their premium HDTV services.

These services are provided by locally built satellites from ISRO such as [15] INSAT 4CR, INSAT 4A, INSAT-2E, INSAT-3C and INSAT-3E as well as private satellites such as the Dutch-based SES, Global-owned NSS 6, Thaicom-2 and Telstar 10.

=== Indonesia ===
The first satellite television provider in Indonesia, Indovision (currently MNC Vision), was established on 16 January 1994; initially utilizing Palapa B2P satellite. Today there are a bunch of satellite television providers as well as satellite channels, both free-to-air and pay. Satellite television providers, other than MNC Vision, include K-Vision (also owned by MNC Vision), Transvision, Nex Parabola, and Accola Play. Satellite channels include IDX Channel and SEA Today.

=== Japan ===
The medium-scale Broadcasting Satellite for Experimental Purposes (BSE) was planned by Ministry of Posts and Telecommunications (MOPT) and developed by the National Space Development Agency of Japan (NASDA) since 1974. After that, the first Japanese experimental broadcasting satellite, called BSE or Yuri, was launched in 1978. NHK started experimental broadcasting of TV program using BS-2a satellite in May 1984.

The satellite BS-2a was launched in preparation for the start of full scale 2-channel broadcasts. Broadcasting Satellite BS-2a, part of the Yuri series, was the first national DBS (direct broadcasting satellite), transmitting signals directly into the home of TV viewers. Attitude control of the satellite was conducted using the 3 axial method (zero momentum), and design life was 5 years. The TV transponder units are designed to sufficiently amplify transmitted signals to enable reception by small, 40 or 60 cm home-use parabolic antennas. The satellite was equipped with 3 TV transponders (including reserve units). However, one transponder malfunctioned 2 months after launch (23 March 1984) and a second transponder malfunctioned 3 months after launch (3 May 1984). So, the scheduled satellite broadcasting had to be hastily adjusted to test broadcasting on a single channel.

Later, NHK started regular service (NTSC) and experimental HDTV broadcasting using BS-2b in June 1989. Some Japanese producers of home electronic consumer devices began to deliver TV sets, VCRs and even home acoustic systems equipped by built-in satellite tuners or receivers. Such electronic goods had a specific BS logo.

In April 1991, Japanese company Japan Satellite Broadcasting (JSB) started pay TV service while BS-3 communication satellite was in use. In 1996 total number of households that receive satellite broadcasting exceeded 10 million.

The modern two satellite systems in use in Japan are BSAT and JCSAT; the modern WOWOW Broadcasting Satellite digital service uses BSAT satellites, while other system of digital TV broadcasting SKY PerfecTV! uses JCSAT satellites.

=== Kazakhstan ===
The first satellite TV channel in Kazakhstan, CaspioNet, was launched by the Khabar news agency in 2002.

=== Malaysia ===
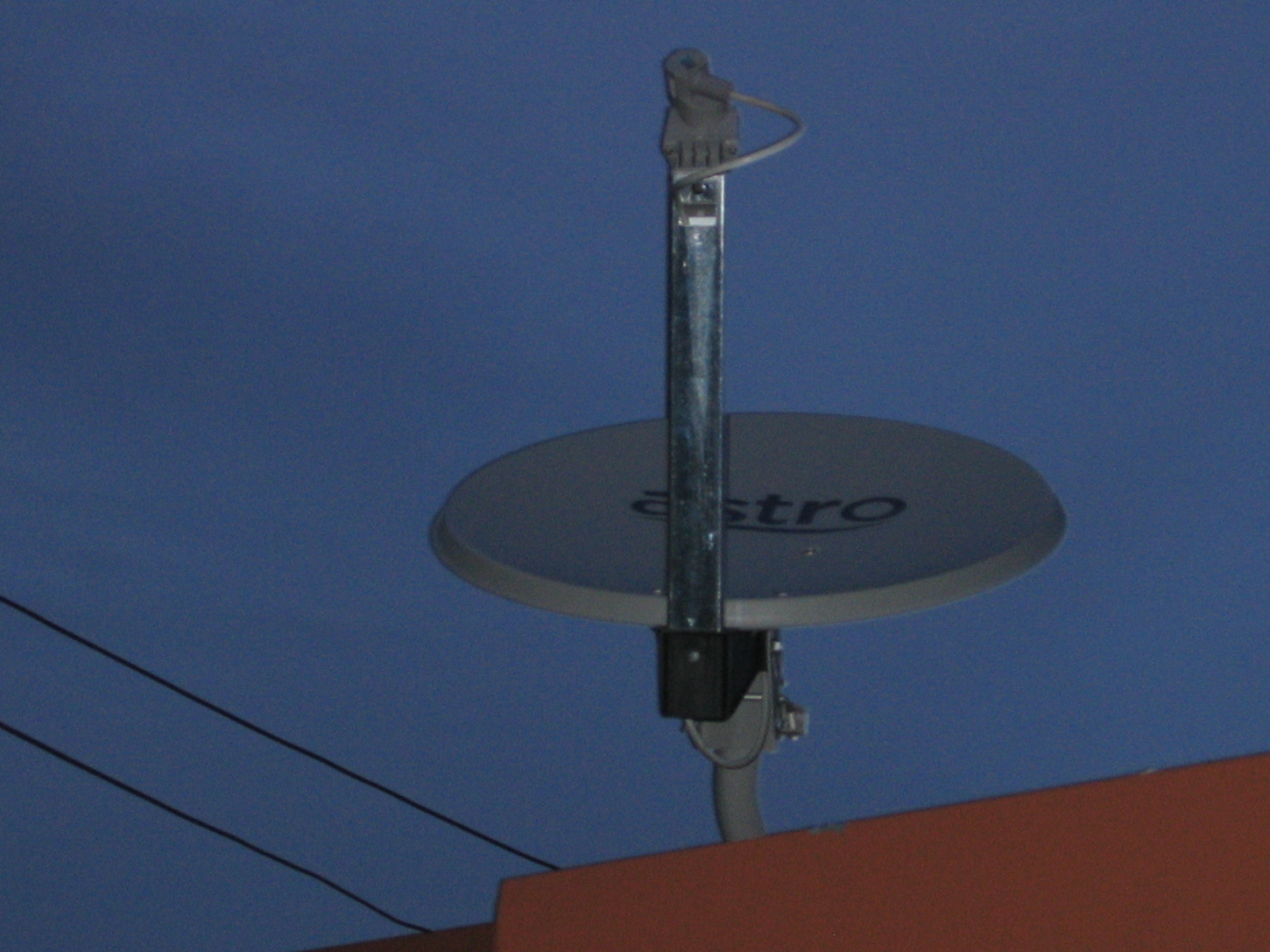
Astro's "mini-dish".

Malaysia's sole satellite television operator, Measat Broadcast Network Systems (a subsidiary of Astro All Asia Networks plc) launched Astro in 1996. It currently holds exclusive rights from the Malaysian government to offer satellite television broadcasting services in the country through the year 2017.

=== Mongolia ===
The Naran station (aka Orbit Station) is first satellite television in Mongolia. In 1991, Naran Station broadcast one channel, which is MNB. In 2005, Naran station extended the channel list up to 4 FTA channels. In 2010 they stopped television broadcast. Government has decided to allow private company does the service in 2008. DDishTV broadcast 18 channels, including 15 local channels and 3 foreign channels since 2008. DDishTV LLC is the satellite television operator in Mongolia.

=== Pakistan ===
Pakistan Television Corporation started its first satellite channel PTV-2 (later renamed to PTV World in 1992, becoming first in South Asia and among the pioneers of this service in Asia. In the recent years, there has been a lot of investment in television industry in Pakistan. There are more than 34 Satellite channels operating directly inside Pakistan and about 10 operating their broadcasting from Dubai, Thailand, Bangkok and UK. At the moment, Pakistan has no DTH in the country, DTH auction happened in 2016, but nearly a decade passed, but not DTH launched due to corruption and incompetency of PEMRA and politicians.

=== Philippines ===
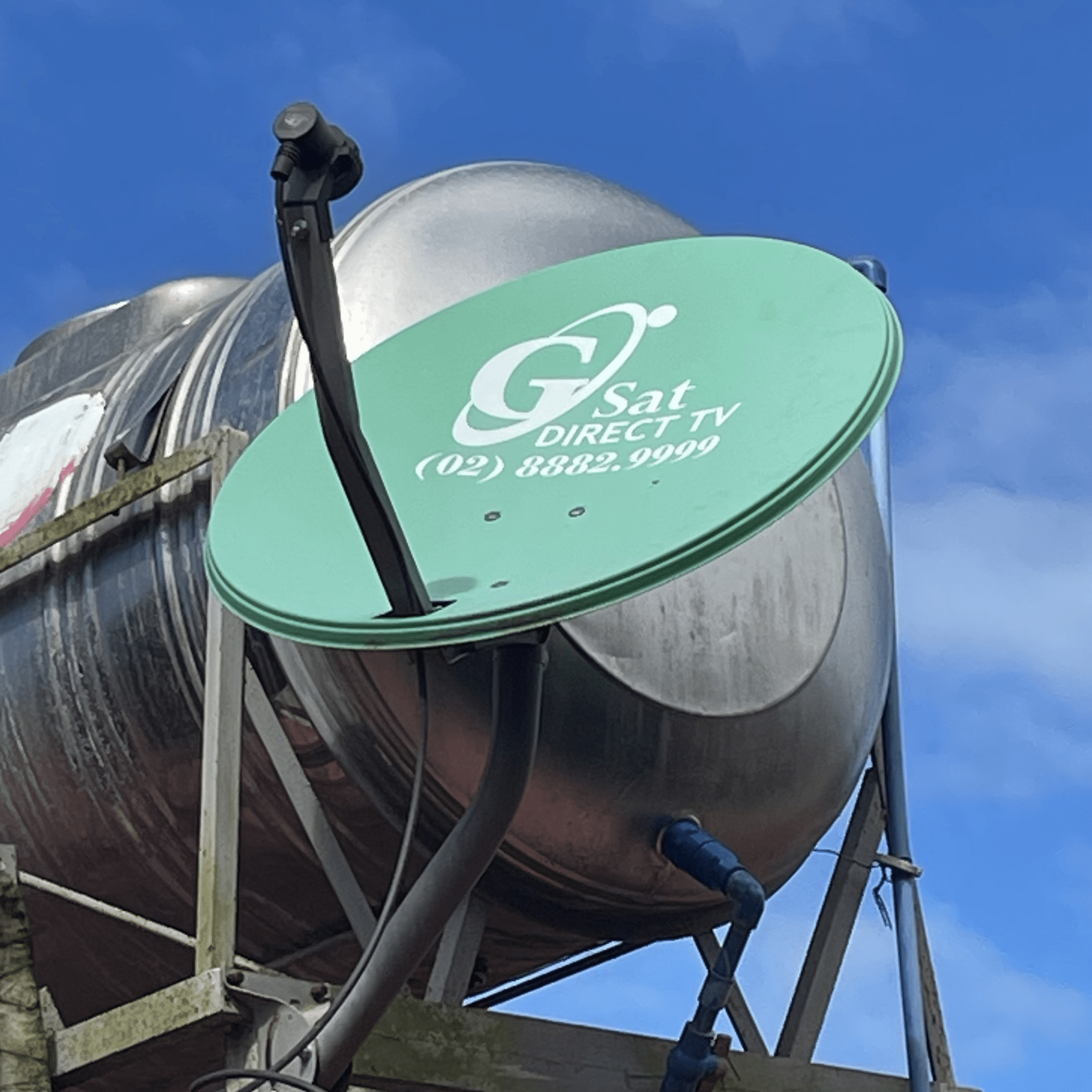
G Sat's satellite dish

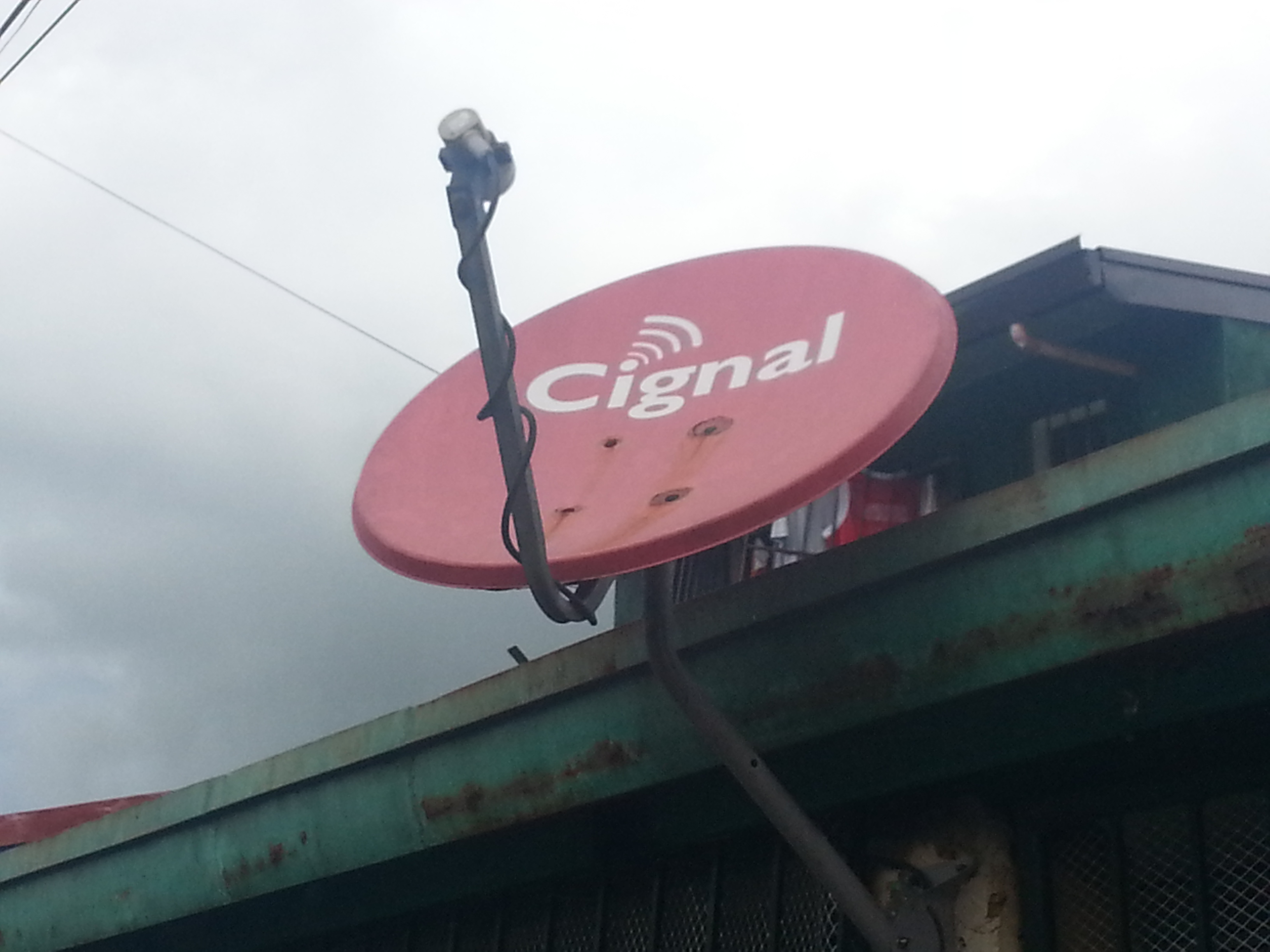
Cignal's satellite dish

Satellite television in the Philippines began in 2001 when the first pay DTH service Dream Satellite TV was launched. In 2009, both Cignal and G Sat were launched on the NSS 11 broadcasting satellite. Later, these satellite TV providers began offering HD. However, G Sat HD has different channels than Cignal HD. Later in 2012, Cignal began to move their programming to SES-7 for similar coverage.

On 31 December 2017, Dream Satellite TV ceased its direct-to-home pay satellite TV service after 16 years, due to bankruptcy and stiff competition from satellite-based pay TV services at the time prior to its bankruptcy (e.g. Cignal, G Sat and the now-defunct Sky Direct). The transponder of the now-defunct Dream Satellite TV that was used on Koreasat 7 would later be used for SatLite on 12 January 2018, a digital prepaid pay TV service that's owned by Cignal TV, Inc.

On 30 June 2020, Sky Direct ceased its operations after an alias cease-and-desist order (ACDO) was issued by the National Telecommunications Commission (NTC) and Solicitor General Jose Calida regarding the expiration of ABS-CBN's legislative franchise.

These are the satellite-based pay TV providers that are currently operating in the Philippines:

- Cignal (owned by Cignal TV, Inc., also known as Mediascape)
- G Sat (owned by Global Satellite Technology Services)
- SatLite (owned by Cignal TV, Inc., also known as Mediascape)

=== Sri Lanka ===
Satellite TV in Sri Lanka began in 2005 as CBNsat. However, it was later acquired by the island's mobile GSM Operator, Dialog and was relaunched as Dialog TV. In 2015 Dish TV India started their operations in Sri Lanka in a joint venture with Satnet (Pvt) Ltd, as Dish TV Lanka which is now the 2nd largest DTH Operator in the island.

=== Thailand ===
TrueVisions is the leading pay TV service of Thailand which operate cable TV in Bangkok and satellite TV across the country. TrueVisions is owned by True Corporation. VIet Nam sat is just launched in 4/2008 and GMM Grammy is the second pay TV service of Thailand.

== Oceania ==
=== Australia ===
Satellite television in Australia has proven to be a far more feasible option than cable television, due to the vast distances between population centres. The first service to come online in Australia was Galaxy, which was later taken over by Cable Television giant Foxtel, which now operates both cable and satellite services to all state capital cities (except Darwin and Hobart) and the whole of Western Australia. Its main metropolitan rival was Optus Vision, while rural areas are served by Austar, both of which just rebroadcast Foxtel as of 2005. In 2006 SelecTV began operating, aiming at providing comparatively low cost packages and catering to specialised market segments. In 2010, SelecTV ceased operation and handed over all of their English-language content customers to Foxtel.

=== New Zealand ===
In New Zealand, SKY Network Television offers multichannel digital satellite TV, and once offered non-digital terrestrial UHF service which was shut down progressively during the first half of 2010. The Freeview service, launched in 2007, is also available on the Optus D1 satellite, as well as a High Definition digital terrestrial service.

== Europe ==
=== Continental Western Europe ===
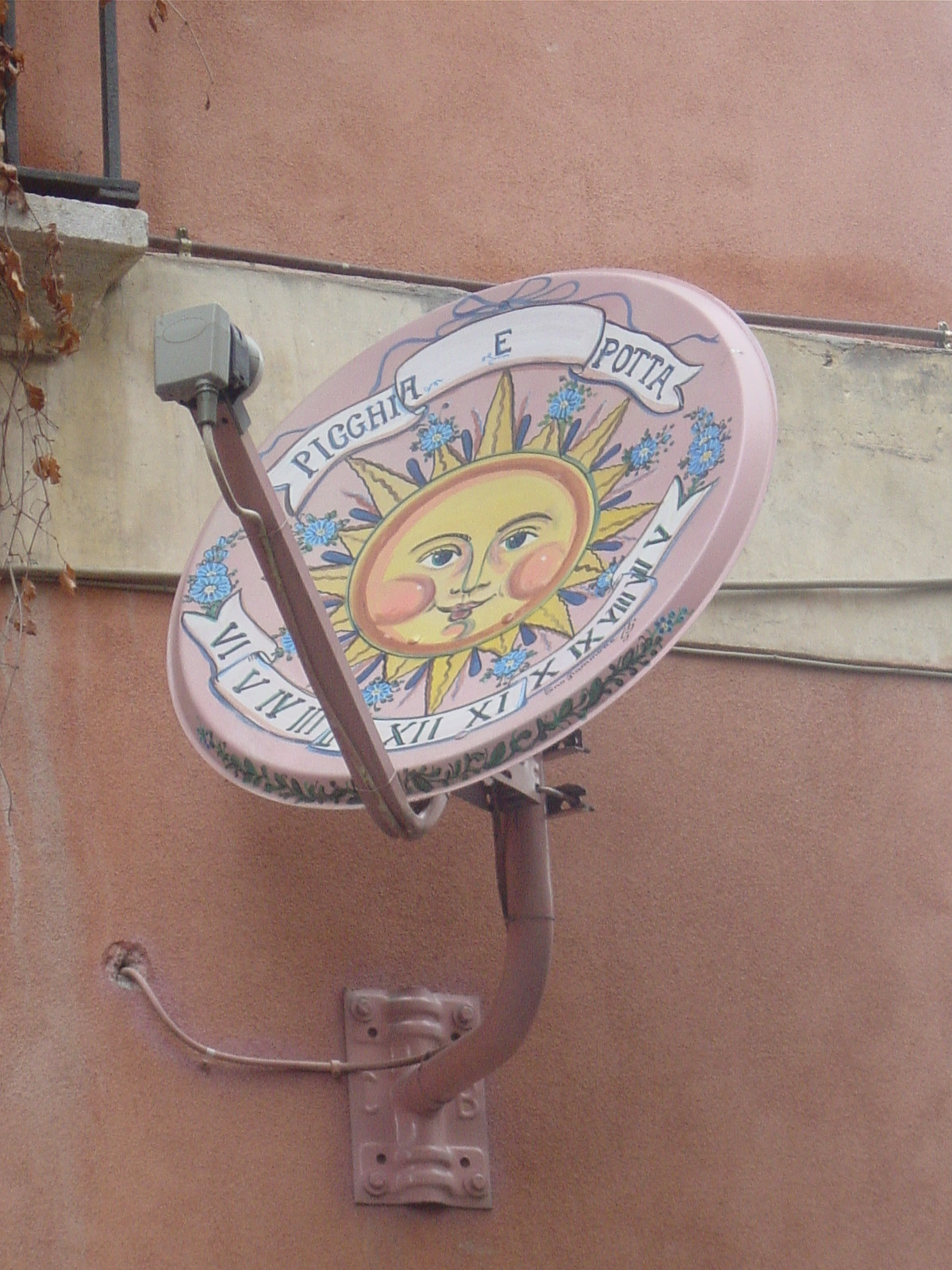
Artistic parabolic antenna in Taormina, Sicily.

In Europe, DBS satellite services are found mainly on SES Astra and Eutelsat Hotbird fleets. Sky Group, owned by Comcast, operates with his subsidiaries in the United Kingdom, in the Republic of Ireland, in Italy, in Germany, in Austria and in Switzerland. Canal Digitaal and UPC are the main providers in the Netherlands and Central Europe, respectively. Vivendi's owned Canal+ is the main provider in France.

The overall market share of DBS satellite services in 2004 was 21.4% of all TV homes, however this highly varies from country to country. For example, in Germany, with many free-to-air TV-stations, DBS market share is almost 40%, and in Belgium and the Netherlands, it's only about 7%, due to the widespread cable networks with exclusive content.

=== Portugal ===
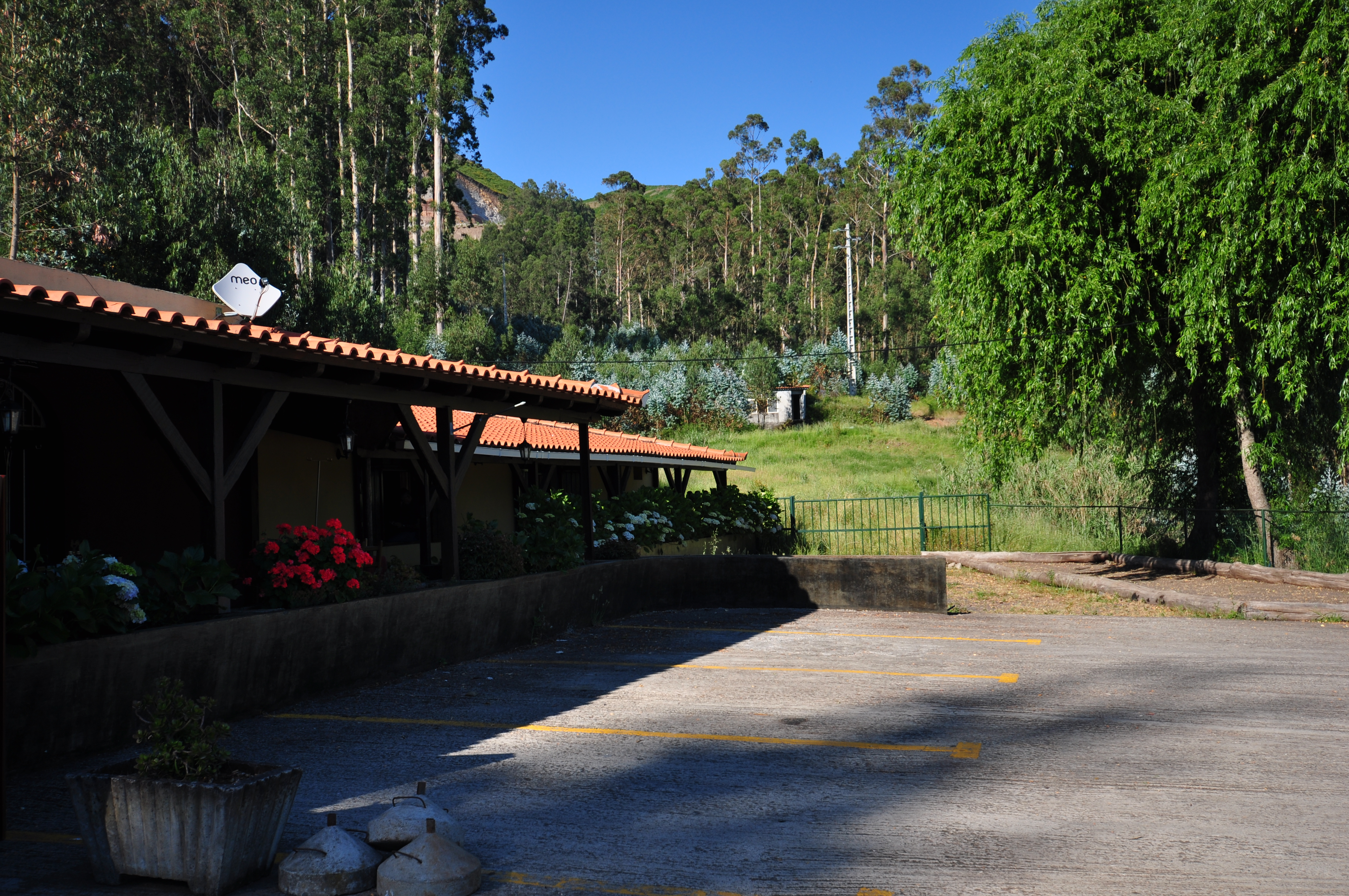
Meo satellite

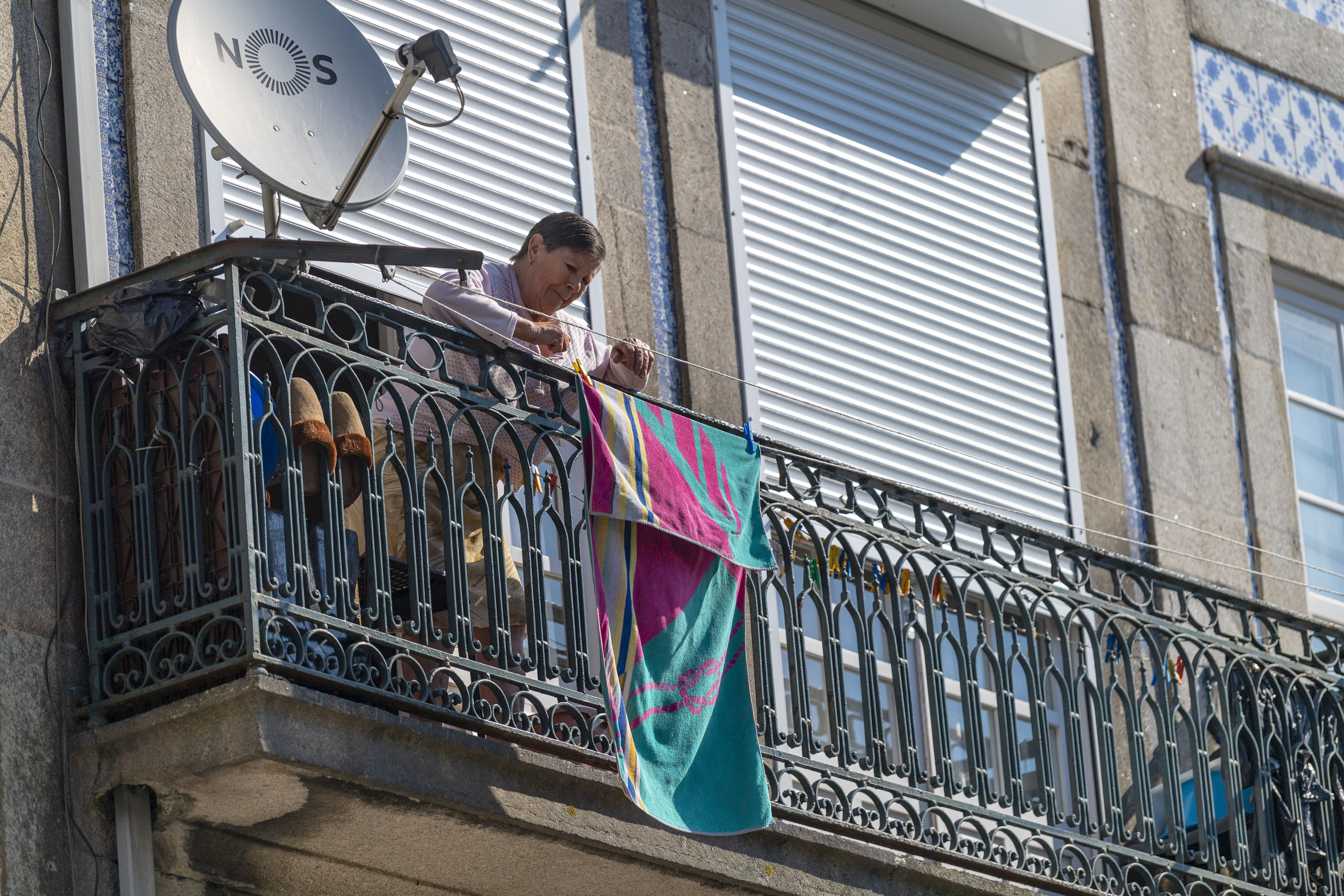
Nos satellite

In Portugal, Hispasat 30W-5 satellite television is received mostly through MEO and NOS and the portuguese free-to-air tuning of Eutelsat Hot Bird satellites through private parabolic antennas.

=== Spain ===
Spain's company Hispasat operates satellites for free channels and several payment platforms. However, the most common operator Movistar Plus+, broadcast via Astra 1KR and lately push their clients to use their own fiber internet network, if it's available.

=== United Kingdom and Ireland ===
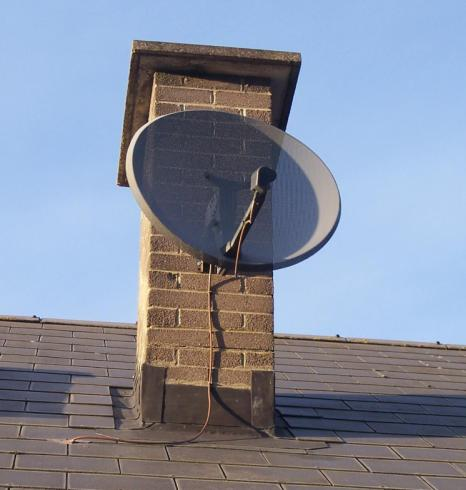
Sky UK "mini-dish"

The first commercial DBS service in the United Kingdom, Sky Television, was launched in 1989 and used the newly launched SES Astra 1A satellite, providing 4 analogue TV channels. The channels and subsequent VideoCrypt video encryption system used the existing PAL broadcast standard. This gave Sky a distinct advantage over the winner of the UK state DBS licence, BSB. In the following year, after many delays, BSB was launched, broadcasting five channels (Now, Galaxy, The Movie Channel, The Power Station and The Sports Channel) in D-MAC format and using the EuroCypher video encryption system which was based heavily on the General Instruments VideoCipher system used in the US. While the BSB's broadcast standard and system was technologically more advanced than the PAL based Sky system and one of the main selling points of the BSB offering was the Squarial, an expensive flat plate antenna and LNB. Sky's system used conventional cheap dish and LNB technology. The BSB system used an integrated receiver / decoder whereas the Sky system had standalone decoders and integrated receiver decoders. This allowed Sky to market directly to an audience that already had satellite TV systems.

The competition between the two companies was fierce and bidding wars over the UK rights to movies. Sky kept costs to a bare minimum, operating from an industrial park in Isleworth in West London. BSB had expensive offices in London (Marco Polo House). The two services subsequently merged to form British Sky Broadcasting (BSkyB) though the new BSkyB was really Sky. The technologically more advanced BSB D-MAC/EuroCypher system was gradually replaced with Sky's VideoCrypt video encryption system.

In 1994 17% of the group was floated on the London Stock Exchange (with ADRs listed on the New York Stock Exchange), and Rupert Murdoch's News Corporation owns a 35% stake.

By 1999, following the launch of several more satellites (at Astra 19.2°E by SES), the number of channels had increased to around 60 and BSkyB launched the first subscription-based digital television platform in the UK, offering a range of 300 channels broadcast from the SES Astra satellites at Astra 28.2°E under the brand name Sky Digital. BSkyB's analogue service was discontinued on 31 December 2001 and all customers have migrated to Sky Digital.

In May 2008, a free-to-air satellite service from the BBC and ITV was launched under the brand name Freesat, carrying a variety of channels, including some content in HD formats.

Comcast, the largest cable TV provider in the US, outbid 21st Century Fox and its backer, Disney, on 22 September 2018, in an auction for control of Sky UK. Its shareholders have until 11 October 2018, to accept or reject the offer.

=== Russian Federation ===
The first Soviet communication satellite, called Molniya (Молния, or "Lightning"), was launched in 1965. By November 1967, the national system of satellite television, called Orbita, was deployed. The Communist party considered propaganda as the very important task, and the only allowed (later two) TV channel of the central government had to be delivered to regions on a huge territory, and, if possible, abroad. The system consisted of three highly elliptical Molniya satellites, Moscow-based ground uplink facilities and about 20 downlink stations, located in cities and towns of remote regions of Siberia and the Far East. Each station had a 12-meter receiving parabolic antenna and transmitters for re-broadcasting TV signal to local householders.

However, a large part of Soviet central regions were still not covered by transponders of Molniya satellites. By 1976, Soviet engineers developed a relatively simple and inexpensive system of satellite television (especially for Central and Northern Siberia). It included geostationary satellites called Ekran equipped with powerful 300 W UHF transponders, a broadcasting uplink station and various simple receiving stations located in various towns and villages of Siberian region. The typical receiving station, also called Ekran, represented itself as a home-use analog satellite receiver equipped with simple Yagi-Uda antenna. Later, Ekran satellites were replaced by more advanced Ekran-M series satellites.

In 1979 Soviet engineers developed Moskva (or Moscow) system of broadcasting and delivering of TV signal via satellites. New type of geostationary communication satellites, called Gorizont, were launched. They were equipped by powerful on-board transponders, so the size of receiving parabolic antennas of downlink stations was reduced to 4 and 2.5 meters (in comparison of early 12-meter dishes of standard orbital downlink stations).

By 1989 an improved version of Moskva system of satellite television has been called Moskva Global'naya (or Moscow Global). The system included a few geostationary Gorizont and Express type of communication satellites. TV signal from Moscow Global's satellites could be received in any country of planet except Canada and North-West of the US.

Modern Russian satellite broadcasting services based on powerful geostationary buses such as Gals, Ekspress, USP and Eutelsat which provide a large quantity of free-to-air television channels to millions of householders. Pay-TV is growing in popularity amongst Russian TV viewers. The NTV Russia news company, owned by Gazprom, broadcasts the NTV Plus package to 560,000 households, reaching over 1.5 million viewers.

Tricolor TV (Russian: Триколор ТВ) the biggest satellite television operator. It broadcasts a pack of TV channels in the European part of Russia and most of Siberian, Ural and Far East regions. Broadcasting in the European part has been held since December 2005 from esv Eutelsat W4. Broadcasting in the Eastern regions began in December 2007.

The principal difference between Tricolor TV and other Russian satellite TV operators is a pack of free channels broadcasts by Tricolor TV. There are 12 federal channels including "Pervy", "Rossiya", "NTV", "STS", "Bibigon" and others in the free "Basic" pack. Except these, there are 19 more TV channels for the whole family. The budget pack of satellite channels turned to be very popular among Russian viewers. The number of Tricolor TV's subscribers is the largest in Russia. In December 2009, the audience of Tricolor TV reached 6,000,000 households.

=== Turkey ===
Turkey's first satellite television channel called TRT launched Intelsat satellite in 1987. On 1 March 1989, Turkey's first private TV channel Star TV (previous Magic Box or Star1) test transmission Eutelsat I F-5 satellite in Germany. In 1990, Star1 channel terrestrial TV transmitter with receive satellite on Turkey.

In 1994, Türksat 1B first television channel such as Kent Medya, Kanal E, CTV, BTV, Dokuz TV, KTV, HBB, Süper Kanal, Best TV, Medya Teknik Servisler, UBA, Yavuz RTV, Özdil TV or MNG TV.

In 1995, Eutelsat satellite transmitted four Turkish TV channel TRT int, atv, TGRT or Interstar.

In 1996, Turkey's first digital satellite television channel is Meltem TV. Türksat 1C first television channel such as TRT 1, TRT 2/GAP, TRT 3, TRT 4, TRT int, TRT int-Avrasya, atv, atv int, Kanal D, Euro D, Show TV, Kanal 6, Kanal 7, Samanyolu TV, HBB, Cine5, Maxi TV / Supersport TV, Flash TV, Prima TV, Genç TV, Eko TV, Number One TV, TV1 Azerbaijan, Sun TV, Mesaj TV, Meltem TV, Discovery Channel Turkey, Nickelodeon Turkey, Süper TV or Cumhuriyet TV.

In 2018, Turkey's watches commonly satellite 80 % penetration.

Analogue satellite broadcasting has been discontinued TRT since February 2006.

Turkey's satellite TV is majority Türksat satellite over 300+ free-to-air television or radio channel.

=== Nordic countries ===
The first satellite service specifically set to the Nordic region was TV3 which launched in 1987. With the launch of Astra 1A, getting the TV3 channel got easier. The first Nordic-specific satellite, Tele-X, was launched in 1989. The services directed at Scandinavia were then scattered among several satellites. In 1993, the former BSB satellites were bought by a Swedish and a Norwegian company, respectively. These two satellites were renamed Thor 1 and Sirius 1, moved to new positions and started broadcasting services intended for people in the Nordic region. With the launch of additional Thor and Sirius satellites later in the 1990s, Astra and other satellites were abandoned by the Nordic services with almost all Nordic satellite television migrating to the Sirius and Thor satellites.

Initially the basic channels were free-to-air. This caused several rights problems since viewers throughout Europe were able to see very much acquired English language programming as well as sports for free on the Nordic channels, although the channels only held broadcasting rights for specific countries. One way of avoiding that was to switch from PAL to the D2-MAC standard, hardly used anywhere outside the Nordic region. An unencrypted channel could still be seen in all the Nordic satellite homes, so eventually all channels went encrypted (several of them only being available in one country). There are two competing satellite services: Canal Digital (Norwegian Telenor) and Viasat (Kinnevik). Canal Digital launched in 1997 and was digital from the start, broadcasting from Thor. Kinnevik had been operating an analogue subscription service since the late 1980s, but waited until the year 2000 before launching a digital service. All analogue services from Thor and Sirius will have ceased in 2006, when the three remaining Danish channels go digital-only. The competition between Viasat and Canal Digital has caused some homes in Scandinavia to have to buy two set-top boxes and have two subscriptions to get the full range of channels. Viasat doesn't provide their own channels (TV3, TV3+, ZTV, TV1000 and the Viasat-branded channels) on the Canal Digital platform. Canal Digital does however have exclusive distribution of channels from SBS Broadcasting, Discovery, TV2 Denmark and Eurosport; for several years the Swedish SVT and TV4 channels were also exclusive to Canal Digital.

== Middle East and North Africa ==
The Middle East has a high penetration of homes receiving TV channels via DTH satellite. One of the pioneers of free-to-air digital satellite television is considered to be MBC, which began broadcasting in C band through Arabsat and is the first network in the world to offer a free-to-air Western based English language movie channel to the Middle East audience via its spinoff channel MBC 2. Its direct rival is considered to be Dubai, UAE based Dubai One, earlier called Ch33 then One TV, which was the first channel in the Middle East and North Africa to provide English language general entertainment programing for both Arabs and the expatriate community.

Nourmina Channel is the first satellite channel owned by a Jordanian national of the private sector, which broadcasts on Nile Sat reluctantly 12303H, which covers all the Arab countries, Africa and most parts of Europe - The first digital DTH pay-TV network to provide Indian Entertainment was Orbit Satellite Television and Radio Network broadcasting via Eurobird 2 (Ku band).

Arab Radio and Television Network (ART) is an Arabic-language television network characterized by its multitude of channels. It is based in Jeddah, Saudi Arabia, Founded in 1993.

Showtime Arabia founded in 1996, a joint venture between Viacom (21% stake) and KIPCO (79% stake) started broadcasting.

beIN Sports is a popular sports channel launched in November 2003 as Al Jazeera Sport, beIN Sports also owns the exclusive broadcasting rights in the Arab Middle East for the most important sporting events.

In a year 2009 advertise incorporation Between Orbit and Showtime Arabia to become under the name OSN.

In the same year rise beIN Sports buying ART sport channels which it had owned the rights fifa world cup. The news sparked uproar in the Arab countries, ART has sold broadcast channels remained to OSN, to announce the death of ART Network.

=== Israel ===
In Israel, the satellite television provider yes was founded in 2000. It broadcasts multichannel TV and VOD services via satellites Amos-3 and Amos-7. It also offers DVR capabilities (similar in function to the TiVo) and 4K support.
