= OSN Yahala =

OSNtv Yahala
- Country: United Arab Emirates
- Broadcast area: Middle East; North Africa
- Headquarters: Dubai Media City, Dubai, UAE

Programming
- Language: Arabic
- Picture format: 1080i (HDTV)

Ownership
- Owner: Orbit Showtime Network
- Sister channels: OSN Movies; OSN Sports; OSN News

History
- Launched: April 2011; 14 years ago
- Former names: OSN Yahala (2011-2023)

Links
- Website: www.osn.com

OSNtv Yahala (Arabic: أو إس إن تي في ياهلا) is a pan-Arab Arabic language television network owned by Orbit Showtime Network (OSN). Programming includes talk shows, reality shows, lifestyle shows, dramas and comedies.

== OSN Yahala International ==
In Canada, OSN Yahala is an Exempted Category B service operated by the Toronto-based Ethnic Channels Group (ECG). It has the same programming as the Middle Eastern/North African channel, as well as specific Canadian content. It is available in SDTV format via Rogers Cable, Cogeco and Bell Fibe TV.

It was originally launched as Dream 1 (Arabic: دريم وان) but was subsequently re-branded as OSN Yahala International in August 2015.

== Programming ==
- Hindistani
- Kurtlar Vadisi
- Muhteşem Yüzyıl
