= Discovery Channel (Middle East and North Africa) =

- Country: United Arab Emirates
- Broadcast area: Arab world

Programming
- Picture format: 1080i HDTV

Ownership
- Owner: Warner Bros. Discovery EMEA
- Sister channels: Discovery Science; Discovery Family; Investigation Discovery; Animal Planet; Fatafeat; DTX; DLife; DMAX; DKids; TLC; Quest Arabiya

History
- Launched: 1 December 1996; 29 years ago

Discovery Channel (MENA) is the Arab version of the Discovery Channel, using a "factual entertainment" concept similar to the original American channel.

Discovery Channel (MENA) was originally available via Showtime Arabia. Then, it moved to the Orbit Network platform. Currently, the channel is available on OSN and beIN.

== Programming ==
- The Marilyn Denis Show
- MythBusters
- How Do They Do It?
- How It's Made
- True Crime Scene
- American Chopper
- Forensic Factor
- Final 24
- Mission Implausible
- American Hot Rod
- Smash Lab
- China's Man Made Marvels
- Man Made Marvels China
- Wheeler Dealers
- Campervan Crisis
- Really Big Things
- Brainiac
- Beetle Crisis
- Dirty Jobs
- Overhaulin
- Wreck Rescue
- Fifth Gear
- Deadliest Catch
- Building the Future
- Discovery Project Earth
- Kings of Nitro
- Ultimate Survival
- Survivorman
- Ross Kemp in Afghanistan
