= Glocom =

GloCom LLC is a Middle Eastern communication and digital images company founded by Zahid Mirza in 1997. GloCom provides services for digital television studios and up-links as well as broadband networks in the Middle East. Clients include Al Jazeera, CNBC Arabiya, Etisalat, Orbit and Showtime. GloCom has also acted as an advisor to government entities in relation to establishing telecommunication and media infrastructures.

GloCom's business partners include Canon, Harmonic, SES S.A. and ND SatCom.

In October 2007, the satellite communication and transmission services company SES S.A. acquired a stake in GloCom through its subsidiary ND SatCom. Mirza remained a shareholder in GloCom and retained his position as CEO.

GloCom homepage: www.glocomltd.com
