= Orbit Communications Company =

Privately owned pay TV network

- Final logo used from 1994 to 2009
- Type: Private
- Industry: Telecommunication
- Genre: Pay television
- Founded: 10 August 1994; 32 years ago
- Defunct: Half of it 14 September 2009; 17 years ago
- Fate: half of it merged with Showtime Arabia
- Successor: Orbit Showtime Network
- Headquarters: Manama, Bahrain
- Area served: Middle East and North Africa (MENA)
- Services: Direct broadcast satellite Satellite Internet
- Owner: Mawarid Holding
- Divisions: Mediagates
- Website: www.orbit.net

Orbit Communications Company was a privately owned pay television network headquartered in Bahrain. Owned by Saudi Arabia–based Mawarid Holding (via Digital Media Systems), it was the first fully digital, multi-channel, multilingual, pay television service in the Middle East and North Africa and was also the world's first fully end-to-end digital TV network. Launched in 1994, it was originally situated in Tor Sapienza, Rome, Italy as the location was considered entirely suitable to build a satellite farm. Orbit employed around 600 employees who were largely a combination of British and Italian staff with several Arabic speaking nations also represented. Orbit broadcast in several languages around the world including English, Arabic, French, and Filipino.

Some of Orbit's Arabic channels including Bahrain TV, Al Safwa, Fann, Al Yawm, Cinema 1, Cinema 2, Mousalsalat and Mousalsalat +2 and are available throughout North and South America through myTV.

In 2009, to better compete with growing popularity of free-to-air channels and online videos, half of the company merged with Showtime Arabia to form OSN, while the other half continued to make more of it

== Channel lineup ==
- Promotional & Free-to-air:
  - Marhaba TV (defunct)
  - TVMAX Promo (defunct)
  - Orbit Promotional Channel (replaced by Marhaba TV)
  - Orbit Express Shop (defunct)
  - OSN Promotional Channel
- Movies:
- Arabic movies:
  - ART Aflam 1 (defunct)
  - ART Aflam 2 (defunct)
  - ART Cinema (defunct)
  - Cinema 1 (formerly Al Oula)
  - Cinema 2
  - Rotana Cinema
  - Rotana Comedy
  - Rotana Classic
- Foreign movies:
  - Star Movies
  - Super Movies (defunct)
  - Super Movies +1 (defunct)
  - Cinema City (defunct)
  - Cinema City +1 (defunct)
  - Cinema City +2 (defunct)
  - MGM (defunct)
  - Xtra Movies (defunct)
  - Xtra Movies +2 (defunct)
  - Cine TV (defunct)
  - Film World (defunct)
  - Turner Classic Movies
  - MBC 2
  - MBC Max
  - MBC Action
- Sports:
  - Edge Sport
  - Bahrain Sports 1
  - Bahrain Sports 2
  - KSA Sports 1
  - KSA Sports 2
  - Al Riyadiyah 1 (defunct)
  - Al Riyadiyah 2 (defunct)
  - Al Riyadiyah 3 (defunct)
  - Al Riyadiyah 4 (defunct)
  - Al Riyadiyah 5 (defunct)
  - Al Riyadiyah 6 (defunct)
  - Al Riyadiyah 7 (defunct)
  - Al Riyadiyah 8 (defunct)
  - Abu Dhabi Sports 1
  - Abu Dhabi Sports 2
  - Abu Dhabi Sports 3
  - Abu Dhabi Sports 4
  - Orbit ESPN (defunct)
  - Orbit Sports (defunct)
  - Orbit Sports 1 (defunct)
  - Orbit Sports 2 (defunct)
  - Orbit Sports 3 (sefunct)
  - Orbit Sports 4 (defunct)
  - Orbit Sports 5 (defunct)
  - BeIN Sports
  - BeIN Sports News
  - BeIN Sports NBA
  - BeIN Sports Premium
- Kids and documentary and culture:
  - Fun Channel (defunct)
  - Nickelodeon
  - Nick Jr.
  - Nicktoons
  - Disney Channel
  - Disney Junior
  - Disney XD (formerly Jetix)
  - Spacetoon
  - BabyTV
  - CBeebies
  - The History Channel
  - The History Channel 2
  - National Geographic
  - National Geographic Abu Dhabi
  - Nat Geo Wild
  - Discovery Science
  - Discovery Channel
  - Discovery ID
  - Crime Investigation Network
- News:
  - Orbit News (defunct)
  - Orbit News 2 (defunct)
  - CNBC
  - CNN International
  - CNBC Arabiya
  - Bloomberg Television
  - Sky News
  - Sky News Arabia
  - France 24
  - Al Arabiya
  - Al Hadath
  - Al Jazeera
  - Al Jazeera English
  - Al Jazeera Documentary
  - Fox News
  - BBC Arabic (defunct)
  - BBC World News
- Music:
  - MTV 00s
  - MTV Live
  - Music Now
  - Fann
  - Rotana Music
  - Rotana Clip
  - Rotana Khalijiah
  - Wanasah (defunct)
- Series and lifestyle:
  - Al Safwa (formerly Al Thania)
  - Al Yawm (formerly Al Thalitha)
  - Fann
  - ART Hekayat (defunct)
  - ART Hekayat 2 (defunct)
  - Arabic Series Channel
  - Arabic Series Channel +4 (defunct)
  - Arabic Series Channel +2
  - Super Comedy (defunct)
  - Super Comedy +2 (defunct)
  - America Plus (defunct)
  - America Plus +2 (defunct)
  - Star World
  - E!
  - The Hollywood Channel (defunct)
  - Hollywood Star! (defunct)
  - Fashion TV (defunct)
  - TLC
  - BBC Prime
  - BBC Earth
  - BBC First
  - BBC Lifestyle
  - MBC 1
  - MBC 4
  - MBC 5
  - Abu Dhabi TV
  - Emarat TV
  - Sharjah TV
  - Dubai TV
  - MBC Masr
  - MBC Masr 2
  - Bahrain TV
  - Bahrain International
  - Bahrain Lawal
  - Bahrain Quran Kareem Channel (defunct)
  - Saudi TV
  - SBC
  - Saudi Quran Kareem Channel
  - Qatar TV
  - AlRayyan TV
  - TV5Monde Maghreb-Orient
- Pay-per-view:
  - TVMAX 1 (defunct)
  - TVMAX 2 (defunct)
  - TVMAX 3 (defunct)
  - TVMAX Sports 1 (defunct)
  - TVMAX Sports 2 (defunct)
  - TVMAX Sports 3 (defunct)
  - Showtime TVMAX (5 channels) (defunct)
  - OSN On Demand (formerly Show On Demand)
- Pinoy:
  - NBN Pinoy News (defunct)
  - PBO: Pinoy Box Office (defunct)
  - GMA Pinoy TV (defunct)
  - GMA Life TV (defunct)
  - Hollywood Star! (defunct)
- Lebanese:
  - LBCI (defunct)
  - Tele Liban (defunct)
  - Aghani Aghani TV (defunct)
  - MTV One Lebanon (defunct)
  - Alfa:
  - Al Thalitha (replaced by Al Yawm)
  - Al Oula (replaced by Cinema 1)
  - Al Thania (replaced by Al Safwa)
  - The Series Channel
  - The Series Channel +2
  - The Series Channel +4 (defunct)
  - Cinema 1
  - Cinema 2
  - Fann
  - Music Now
- Radio:
  - Monawa't (defunct)
  - Tarabiya't (defunct)
  - Khalijya't (defunct)
  - BBC World Media Service (defunct)
  - Radio Rotana
  - GMA DZBB
  - Radio Mosaic
  - BBC World Service Arabic
  - BBC World Service English
  - Monte Carlo Doualiya
  - Al Jazeera Radio
  - Sky News Arabic
  - GMA DZBB
  - DWLS FM
  - Radio Bahrain Arabic
  - Radio Bahrain English
  - AFN Bahrain FM
  - BFBS Bahrain
  - The Voice Of Ummah
  - BBC Radio 3
  - BBC Radio 4
  - MBC FM
  - Panorama FM
  - Al Arabiya FM
  - Mood FM
  - Quran Kareem FM
- Free-to-air:

Up to 500 and more Free-to-air television and radio channels (including Arabsat, Nilesat and Hotbird, based on type of connection).

== Orbit ESPN removal ==
On 1 April 2008, after being on the air since 1994, Orbit ESPN was dropped from the Orbit lineup. This left Orbit without coverage of the NCAA, Major League Baseball, the National Basketball Association, the National Hockey League, Major League Soccer, the National Football League, NASCAR, IndyCar Series, major golf and tennis tournaments or ESPN's action sports franchise, X Games.

Fox Sports replaced Orbit ESPN on 13 January 2009.

One of the reasons that break the contract with ESPN is the severe financial problems happened at that time, since 1999–2000 the production graph line has been moved down. In 2009, a major delay in paying salaries for Orbit employees in Egypt, Lebanon and KSA for more than four months.

== BBC Arabic television ==
BBC Arabic Television was originally transmitted via Orbit from 1994 until 21 April 1996, when it was taken off air by Orbit after the channel broadcast an episode of the BBC Panorama program critical of the Saudi Arabian government. Many of the BBC Arabic Television staff then went to work for Al Jazeera. The BBC has since relaunched the channel autonomously in 2008.

== Showtime Arabia merger ==
On 12 July 2009, Showtime Arabia and half of Orbit Communications Company announced a merger that created the “biggest Pay-TV platform” in the Middle East and North Africa.

The newly formed company, which is called OSN, is an equal partnership that would offer 70 exclusive channels featuring new movies, sports, series, Arabic content and international shows.

New customers can subscribe to packages featuring Showtime Arabia and Orbit's programs, while existing subscribers will be able to either retain or upgrade their content. The company will offer HD channels, video on demand and other interactive services.
