= Fatafeat =

Television channel

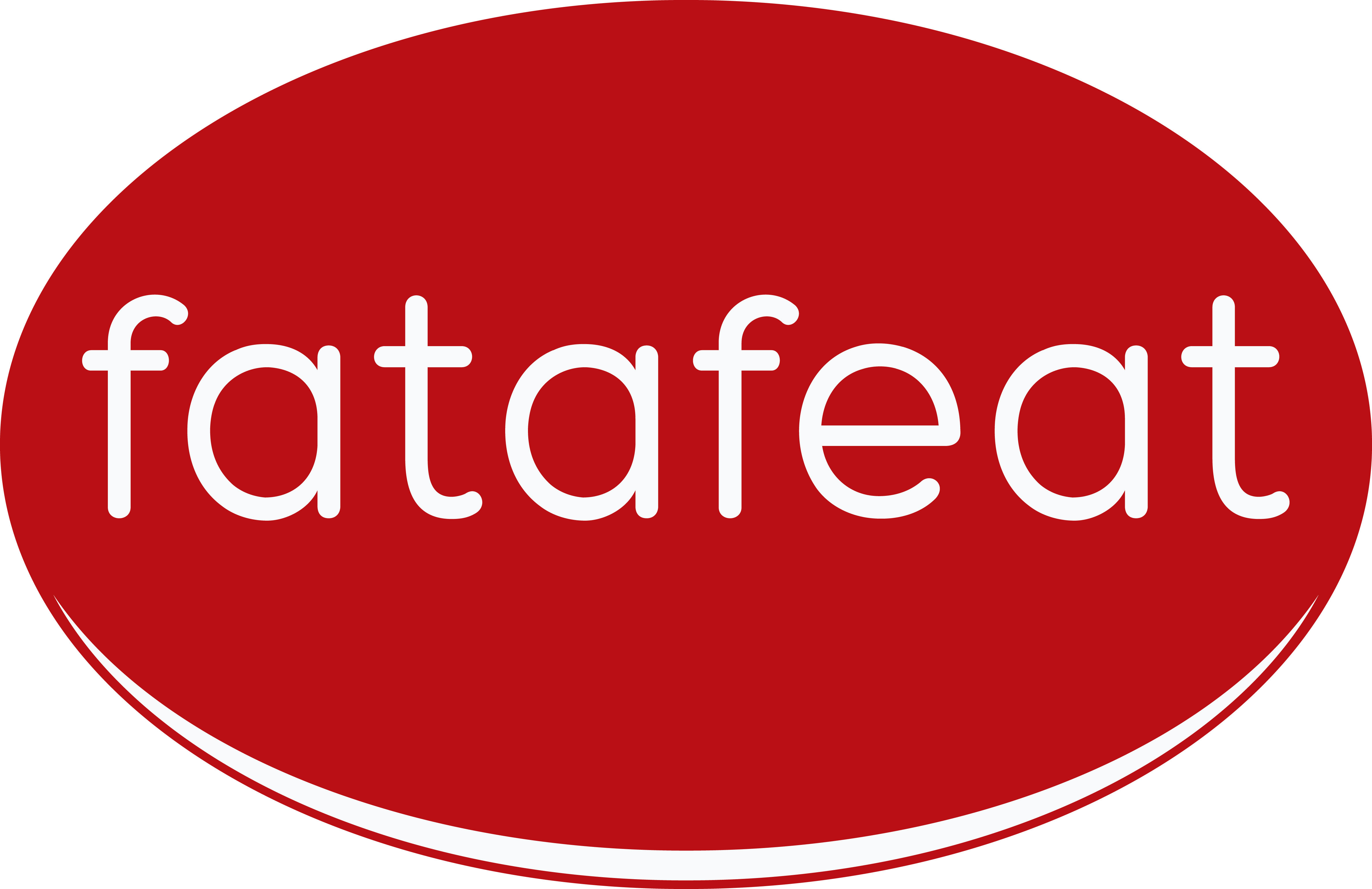
- Country: United Arab Emirates & Egypt
- Broadcast area: Middle East and North Africa
- Headquarters: Dubai, United Arab Emirates

Programming
- Languages: English (most programs); Arabic (subtitles, promos, and some shows)
- Picture format: 576i (SDTV) (2006–2016); 1080i (HDTV) (2016–present)

Ownership
- Owner: Skydance
- Sister channels: Discovery Channel; Discovery Science; Discovery Family; Investigation Discovery; Animal Planet; DTX; DLife; DMAX; DKids; TLC; Quest Arabiya

History
- Launched: 26 December 2006; 19 years ago

Links
- Website: fatafeat.com

Fatafeat (Arabic: فتافيت), is a Middle Eastern food and lifestyle television channel owned by Takhayal Entertainment, which is part of Skydance

On 1 April 2016, Fatafeat stopped broadcasting as a free-to-air channel and started being encrypted on satellite provider beIN under its "Top Entertainment" and "Complete" packages.

On 1 January 2024, Fatafeat started being encrypted on satellite provider OSN under its OSNtv Connect package.
