= DKids =

United Arab Emirates TV channel

Discovery Kids
- Country: United Arab Emirates
- Broadcast area: United Arab Emirates; Saudi Arabia; Egypt; Lebanon; Syria; Yemen; Iraq; Kuwait; Bahrain; Qatar; Morocco; Mauritania; Oman; Libya; Tunisia; Algeria; Palestine; Jordan

Programming
- Languages: English; Arabic
- Picture format: 1080i (HDTV)

Ownership
- Owner: Discovery EMEA
- Sister channels: Discovery Channel; Discovery Science; Discovery Family; Investigation Discovery; Animal Planet; Fatafeat; DTX; DMAX; DLife; TLC; Quest Arabiya

History
- Launched: 1 August 2016; 9 years ago
- Closed: 8 February 2021; 5 years ago

DKids, also known as Discovery Kids, was a children's television channel owned by Discovery, Inc. It was an edition of the Discovery Kids channel that aired in the MENA region and was available in both English and Arabic. It first launched on August 1, 2016 and was broadcast via beIN Network.

== Programming (before the network shuttered) ==
- 3 Amigonauts
- The 99
- Adventures in Duckport
- Agi Bagi
- Anabel
- Animanimals
- Astroblast!
- The Bagel and Becky Show
- Bob the Builder (2015)
- Chop Chop Ninja
- Coconut the Little Dragon
- Daisy & Ollie
- Doki
- Dr. Panda
- Earth to Luna!
- Esme & Roy
- Fishtronaut
- The Fixies
- Four and a Half Friends
- The Fo-Fo Figgily Show
- Gawayn
- Genius Genie
- Gon
- Hanazuki: Full of Treasures
- Helen's Little School
- Hero: 108
- Hi-5 (Season 17)
- The Insectibles
- Invention Story
- Jay's Jungle
- Kody Kapow
- Lilybuds
- Littlest Pet Shop (2012)
- Littlest Pet Shop: A World of Our Own
- Magiki
- Mondo Yan
- My Little Pony: Friendship Is Magic
- Nate Is Late
- The Ollie & Moon Show
- Pac-Man and the Ghostly Adventures
- Paper Tales
- Peppa Pig
- Ping and Friends
- Pip Ahoy!
- Planet Cosmo
- Plim Plim
- Purple Turtle
- Robot Trains
- Sesame Street (Season 47)
- Shutterbugs
- Simon
- Sinbad and the 7 Galaxies
- Smighties
- The Strange Chores
- Suzy's Zoo: Adventures in Duckport
- Transformers: Rescue Bots
- Transformers: Rescue Bots Academy
- Vroomiz
- Wild Kratts
- Wissper
- Wow Wow Rolling Friends
- The ZhuZhus
