= List of One of the Baes episodes =

One of the Baes is a 2019 Philippine television drama romance comedy series broadcast by GMA Network. It premiered on the network's Telebabad line up and worldwide via GMA Pinoy TV from September 30, 2019, to January 31, 2020, replacing The Better Woman.

== Series overview ==
Season	Episodes	Originally released	
Season	Episodes	First released	Last released
1	90	September 30, 2019	January 31, 2020

== Episodes ==
No. overall	No. in season	Title	Social media hashtag	Original release date	AGB Nielsen Ratings (NUTAM People)	Timeslot rank
1	1	"Pilot"	#OneOfTheBaesPilot	September 30, 2019	8.5%	#2
2	2	"Grabeh" (transl. Great)	#OOTBgrabeh	October 1, 2019	8.4%	#1
3	3	"Tse!"	#OOTBtse	October 2, 2019	8.6%	#1
4	4	"Anovah?!"	#OOTBanovah	October 3, 2019	8.8%	#2
5	5	"Luh"	#OOTBluh	October 4, 2019	8.7%	#2
6	6	"Di Ko Keri" (transl. I Can't Take It)	#OOTBdikokeri	October 7, 2019	8.2%	#1
7	7	"Karma is Real"	#OOTBkarmaisreal	October 8, 2019	8.0%	#2
8	8	"Huy" (transl. Hey)	#OOTBhuy	October 9, 2019	8.2%	#1
9	9	"Pak"	#OOTBpak	October 10, 2019	8.2%	#2
10	10	"Push"	#OOTBpush	October 11, 2019	8.2%	#2
11	11	"Hanep"	#OOTBhanep	October 14, 2019	8.8%	#2
12	12	"Ginalingan" (transl. Performed)	#OOTBginalingan	October 15, 2019	8.0%	#1
13	13	"Echoserang Frog"	#OOTBechoserangfrog	October 16, 2019	8.0%	#2
14	14	"Mesherep" (transl. Delicious)	#OOTBmesherep	October 17, 2019	8.2%	#2
15	15	"Good Job"	#OOTBgoodjob	October 18, 2019	8.4%	#1
16	16	"Congrats"	#OOTBcongrats	October 21, 2019	7.0%	#2
17	17	"Ganda Koh" (transl. I'm Beautiful)	#OOTBgandakoh	October 22, 2019	8.2%	#1
18	18	"OMG"	#OOTBomg	October 23, 2019	7.9%	#2
19	19	"Wow"	#OOTBwow	October 24, 2019	9.0%	#1
20	20	"Let's Do It"	#OOTBLetsDoIt	October 25, 2019	9.4%	#1
21	21	"Sige, Go!" (transl. OK, Go!)	#OOTBSigeGo	October 28, 2019	7.7%	#2
22	22	"Heto Na Talaga" (transl. This is Really It)	#OOTBhetonatalaga	October 29, 2019	8.5%	#1
23	23	"Galing" (transl. Amazing)	#OOTBgaling	October 30, 2019	8.8%	#1
24	24	"Happy Lahat" (transl. Everyone is Happy)	#OOTBHappyLahat	October 31, 2019	9.0%	#1
25	25	"Naks Naman"	#OOTBNaksNaman	November 1, 2019	8.5%	#1
26	26	"Ayos Yan" (transl. That's Right)	#OOTBAyosYan	November 4, 2019	7.7%	#2
27	27	"Good Vibes"	#OOTBgoodvibes	November 5, 2019	8.5%	#1
28	28	"Ibang Klase" (transl. Different Kind)	#OOTBibangklase	November 6, 2019	8.2%	#2
29	29	"Lavet"	#OOTBlavet	November 7, 2019	8.8%	#1
30	30	"Kalma Lang" (transl. Keep Calm)	#OOTBkalmalang	November 8, 2019	8.8%	#1
31	31	"JoLai"	#OOTBjolai	November 11, 2019	8.0%	#1
32	32	"Next Level"	#OOTBnextlevel	November 12, 2019	8.0%	#1
33	33	"Keep Sailing"	#OOTBkeepsailing	November 13, 2019	8.5%	#1
34	34	"Salamatz" (transl. Thank You)	#OOTBsalamatz	November 14, 2019	7.9%	#1
35	35	"Mahal Kita" (transl. I Love You)	#OOTBmahalkita	November 15, 2019	8.9%	#1
36	36	"Perfect"	#OOTBperfect	November 18, 2019	7.6%	#2
37	37	"Oh My Gosh"	#OOTBohmygosh	November 19, 2019	7.1%	#2
38	38	"Lavan" (transl. Fight)	#OOTBlavan	November 20, 2019	7.8%	#2
39	39	"Shocking"	#OOTBshocking	November 21, 2019	8.6%	#1
40	40	"Teamwork"	#OOTBteamwork	November 22, 2019	8.7%	#1
41	41	"I Love You"	#OOTBiloveyou	November 25, 2019	7.8%	#2
42	42	"Pasabog" (transl. Explosion)	#OOTBpasabog	November 26, 2019	7.8%	#2
43	43	"Alam Na" (transl. Revealed)	#OOTBalamna	November 27, 2019	8.0%	#2
44	44	"Troot"	#OOTBtroot	November 28, 2019	8.1%	#1
45	45	"Hugs"	#OOTBhugs	November 29, 2019	8.3%	#1
46	46	"Check na Check"	#OOTBchecknacheck	December 2, 2019	8.0%	#1
47	47	"Nice One"	#OOTBniceone	December 3, 2019	8.5%	#1
48	48	"In Love"	#OOTBinlove	December 4, 2019	8.0%	#1
49	49	"Ligawan Mo Na" (transl. Swoon Him/Her)	#OOTBligawanmona	December 5, 2019	7.8%	#2
50	50	"Ibang Level" (transl. Different Level)	#OOTBibanglevel	December 6, 2019	8.2%	#1
51	51	"Welcome Home"	#OOTBwelcomehome	December 9, 2019	8.2%	#1
52	52	"Happy Fiesta"	#OOTBhappyfiesta	December 10, 2019	8.1%	#1
53	53	"Tuloy ang Saya" (transl. The Excitement Continues)	#OOTBtuloyangsaya	December 11, 2019	7.7%	#2
54	54	"Pasok, Mga Suki" (transl. Welcome, Customers)	#OOTBpasokmgasuki	December 12, 2019	8.1%	#1
55	55	"Wampipti" (transl. One Fifty)	#OOTBwampipti	December 13, 2019	8.3%	#1
56	56	"Akbayan Mo Na" (transl. Escort Him/Her)	#OOTBakbayanmona	December 16, 2019	8.3%	#2
57	57	"Laban Munting Pangarap" (transl. Fight for your Wish)	#OOTBlabanmuntingpangarap	December 17, 2019	8.6%	#1
58	58	"Happy Family"	#OOTBhappyfamily	December 18, 2019	8.9%	#1
59	59	"Kilig Tologo" (transl. Really Romantic)	#OOTBkiligtologo	December 19, 2019	8.3%	#1
60	60	"Di Mapigilan" (transl. Can't Stop)	#OOTBdimapigilan	December 20, 2019	8.7%	#1
61	61	"Hep Hep Hooray"	#OOTBhephephooray	December 23, 2019	8.5%	#1
62	62	"Ibigay Mo Na" (transl. Give It)	#OOTBibigaymona	December 24, 2019	6.0%	#2
63	63	"Peace Tayo" (transl. Have Peace)	#OOTBpeacetayo	December 25, 2019	5.9%	#2
64	64	"Love Kita" (transl. I Love You)	#OOTBlovekita	December 26, 2019	6.9%	#2
65	65	"Laban O Bawi" (transl. Fight or Take Back)	#OOTBlabanobawi	December 27, 2019	7.8%	#2
66	66	"Selos Battles" (transl. Jealousy Battles)	#OOTBselosbattles	December 30, 2019	8.3%	#1
67	67	"New Year Dance"	#OOTBnewyeardance	December 31, 2019	7.8%	#1
68	68	"Saving Junjun"	#OOTBsavingjunjun	January 1, 2020	7.2%	#2
69	69	"Cute Surprise"	#OOTBcutesurprise	January 2, 2020	8.4%	#2
70	70	"Sabihin Mo Na Kasi" (transl. Say It Already)	#OOTBSabihinMoNaKasi	January 3, 2020	9.5%	#1
71	71	"Get Get Out"	#OOTBGetGetOut	January 6, 2020	8.1%	#2
72	72	"Love Is In The Air"	#OOTBloveisintheair	January 7, 2020	7.6%	#2
73	73	"Love You Goodbye"	#OOTBloveyougoodbye	January 8, 2020	8.0%	#2
74	74	"Big Reveal"	#OOTBbigreveal	January 9, 2020	7.9%	#2
75	75	"Announcement"	#OOTBannouncement	January 10, 2020	7.1%	#2
76	76	"Reunited"	#OOTBreunited	January 13, 2020	7.8%	#2
77	77	"Kiss Muna" (transl. Kiss First)	#OOTBkissmuna	January 14, 2020	7.9%	#2
78	78	"Awkward Moments"	#OOTBawkwardmoments	January 15, 2020	8.7%	#2
79	79	"Missing You"	#OOTBmissingyou	January 16, 2020	9.0%	#2
80	80	"Finally"	#OOTBfinally	January 17, 2020	8.1%	#2
81	81	"New Beginnings"	#OOTBnewbeginnings	January 20, 2020	8.0%	#2
82	82	"Labyu Na Talaga" (transl. I Really Love You)	#OOTBLabyuNaTalaga	January 21, 2020	8.3%	#2
83	83	"Huli Ka" (transl. You're Caught)	#OOTBhulika	January 22, 2020	8.2%	#2
84	84	"Unli Kiss"	#OOTBunlikiss	January 23, 2020	7.8%	#2
85	85	"Love You Paps"	#OOTBloveyoupaps	January 24, 2020	7.4%	#2
86	86	"Moving Forward"	#OOTBmovingforward	January 27, 2020	7.0%	#2
87	87	"Yes na Yes" (transl. Surely A Yes)	#OOTByesnayes	January 28, 2020	8.2%	#2
88	88	"Saludo" (transl. Salute)	#OOTBsaludo	January 29, 2020	7.8%	#2
89	89	"Wedding Day"	#OOTBweddingday	January 30, 2020	7.0%	#2
90	90	"Finale"	#OneOfTheBaesFinale	January 31, 2020	8.9%	#2
