= List of The Lost Recipe episodes =

The Lost Recipe is a Philippine romantic fantasy drama television series which aired on GMA News TV and GTV. It aired from January 18, 2021 to March 31, 2021 on the network's evening line up and worldwide via GMA Pinoy TV.

== Series overview ==
Season	Episodes	Originally released	
Season	Episodes	First released	Last released
1	52	January 18, 2021	March 31, 2021

== Episodes ==
No. overall	No. in season	Title	Social media hashtag	Original release date	AGB Nielsen Ratings (NUTAM People)	Timeslot rank
1	1	"World Premiere"	#TheLostRecipe	January 18, 2021	1.6%	#3
2	2	"Time Travel"	#TheLostRecipeTimeTravel	January 19, 2021	2.2%	#3
3	3	"Apple vs. Ginger"	#TheLostRecipeAppleVsGinger	January 20, 2021	2.4%	#3
4	4	"Laban, Apple" (transl. Fight, Apple)	#TheLostRecipeLabanApple	January 21, 2021	2.4%	#3
5	5	"Waldorf Returns"	#TheLostRecipeWaldorfReturns	January 22, 2021	2.5%	#3
6	6	"Binagoongan"	#TheLostRecipeBinagoongan	January 25, 2021	2.7%	#3
7	7	"Fighting"	#TheLostRecipeFighting	January 26, 2021	N/A	TBA
8	8	"Chef Sungit" (transl. Grumpy Chef)	#TheLostRecipeChefSungit	January 27, 2021	N/A	TBA
9	9	"Kitchen Kilig" (transl. Kitchen Kiss)	#TheLostRecipeKitchenKilig	January 28, 2021	N/A	TBA
10	10	"ShaiRu"	#ShaiRuOnTLR	January 29, 2021	N/A	TBA
11	11	"Food Battle"	#TheLostRecipeFoodBattle	February 1, 2021	3.2%	#3
12	12	"Final Verdict"	#TheLostRecipeFinalVerdict	February 2, 2021	3.2%	#3
13	13	"Toyo" (transl. Soy Sauce)	#TheLostRecipeToyo	February 3, 2021	3.0%	#3
14	14	"Marupok" (transl. Fragile)	#TheLostRecipeMarupok	February 4, 2021	3.0%	#3
15	15	"Harvey Vs. Frank"	#TheLostRecipeHarveyVsFrank	February 5, 2021	2.6%	#3
16	16	"Kitchen Challenge"	#TheLostRecipeKitchenChallenge	February 8, 2021	N/A	TBA
17	17	"Kitchen Winner"	#TheLostRecipeKitchenWinner	February 9, 2021	N/A	TBA
18	18	"Match"	#TheLostRecipeMatch	February 10, 2021	N/A	TBA
19	19	"Team Harvey"	#TheLostRecipeTeamHarvey	February 11, 2021	N/A	TBA
20	20	"Ganda Ka" (transl. You're Beautiful)	#TheLostRecipeGandaKa	February 12, 2021	N/A	TBA
21	21	"Harvey vs. Ginger"	#TheLostRecipeHarveyVsGinger	February 15, 2021	N/A	TBA
22	22	"Oxygen"	#TheLostRecipeOxygen	February 16, 2021	N/A	TBA
23	23	"Lotus"	#TheLostRecipeLotus	February 17, 2021	N/A	TBA
24	24	"Tamis" (transl. Sweet)	#TheLostRecipeTamis	February 18, 2021	N/A	TBA
25	25	"Love Wars"	#TheLostRecipeLoveWars	February 19, 2021	N/A	TBA
26	26	"Mystery"	#TheLostRecipeMystery	February 22, 2021	3.2%	#3
27	27	"Black Cat"	#TheLostRecipeBlackCat	February 23, 2021	3.5%	#3
28	28	"Revelation"	#TheLostRecipeRevelation	February 24, 2021	2.8%	#3
29	29	"Food Truck"	#TheLostRecipeFoodTruck	February 25, 2021	N/A	TBA
30	30	"Yakap" (transl. Hug)	#TheLostRecipeYakap	February 26, 2021	3.4%	#3
31	31	"Happy Bites"	#TheLostRecipeHappyBites	March 1, 2021	2.8%	#3
32	32	"Alfredo"	#TheLostRecipeAlfredo	March 2, 2021	3.0%	#3
33	33	"Squad Goals"	#TheLostRecipeSquadGoals	March 3, 2021	2.7%	#3
34	34	"Lotus vs. Alfredo"	#TheLostRecipeLotusVsAlfredo	March 4, 2021	N/A	TBA
35	35	"Truth"	#TheLostRecipeTruth	March 5, 2021	3.0%	#3
36	36	"Intense"	#TheLostRecipeIntense	March 8, 2021	3.0%	#3
37	37	"Welcome Back"	#TheLostRecipeWelcomeBack	March 9, 2021	3.0%	#3
38	38	"Puso" (transl. Heart)	#TheLostRecipePuso	March 10, 2021	3.2%	#3
39	39	"In Love"	#TheLostRecipeInLove	March 11, 2021	3.0%	#3
40	40	"Decision"	#TheLostRecipeDecision	March 12, 2021	3.8%	#3
41	41	"Consuelo"	#TheLostRecipeConsuelo	March 15, 2021	2.5%	#3
42	42	"Time"	#TheLostRecipeTime	March 16, 2021	3.2%	#3
43	43	"Apple"	#TheLostRecipeApple	March 17, 2021	2.8%	#3
44	44	"Connection"	#TheLostRecipeConnection	March 18, 2021	N/A	TBA
45	45	"Best Adobo"	#TheLostRecipeBestAdobo	March 19, 2021	2.8%	#3
46	46	"Adobo Wars"	#TheLostRecipeAdoboWars	March 23, 2021 (Note: Episode 46 did not air on March 22 due to live coverage of Pres. Duterte's weekly public address.)	N/A	TBA
47	47	"Winning Adobo"	#TheLostRecipeWinningAdobo	March 24, 2021	2.7%	#3
48	48	"Memories"	#TheLostRecipeMemories	March 25, 2021	2.3%	TBA
49	49	"Destiny"	#TheLostRecipeDestiny	March 26, 2021	2.6%	TBA
50	50	"Forever"	#TheLostRecipeForever	March 29, 2021	2.4%	TBA
51	51	"Tumatakbo" (transl. Running)	#TheLostRecipeTumatakbo	March 30, 2021	3.1%	TBA
52	52	"Sepanx"	#TheLostRecipeSepanx	March 31, 2021	N/A	TBA

Episodes notes
