= Deukom =

Provider of digital television

- Industry: Pay television
- Founded: 1 May 1996; 30 years ago
- Headquarters: Somerset West, South Africa
- Area served: South Africa
- Products: IPTV; Satellite television
- Owner: DEUKOM (Pty) Ltd.
- Website: www.deukom.co.za

Deukom is a provider of digital television for the South African market via IPTV or via satellite, using the Astra 4A satellite at 5° east. (Namibia under Satelio label). The target group are Germans living in South Africa.

== History ==
The transmission of the German-language television takes place since 1 May 1996 via satellite and later on via IPTV, above all in South Africa and Namibia. On April 11, 2016, customers in Namibia were informed by Deukom that German-speaking television will be distributed exclusively by Satelio in the future. Existing customers were switched to Satelio. In South Africa, Deukom also uses Satelio's offer under its own name since May 2016.

== Channels ==
=== TV ===
- Das Erste
- ZDF
- 3sat
- arte
- DW-TV
- RTL Television
- RTL II
- Sat.1
- ProSieben
- VOX
- n-tv
- kabel eins
- Puls 4
- Heimatkanal
- Romance TV
- Nitro
- Super RTL
- ProSieben Maxx
- sixx
- Jukebox
- auto motor und sport channel
- Fix und Foxi TV
- N24

=== Radio ===
- Bayern 1
- Bayern 3
- Klassik Radio
- Hitradio Namibia
- Antenne Bayern
- Radio Paloma
- Rock Antenne
- harmony.fm
- radio ffn
- sunshine live

== Encryption ==
Panaccess is used as conditional access system.
