= Mawarid Holding =

Private Saudi investment company

- Company type: Private Investment company
- Industry: Diversified investments Real estate Financial services Healthcare; Hospitality; Media; Telecommunication
- Founded: 1968; 58 years ago
- Founder: Khalid bin Abdullah Al Saud
- Headquarters: Suleimania, Riyadh, Saudi Arabia
- Key people: Fahd bin Khaled bin Abdullah bin Abdul Rahman Al Saud (Chairman)
- Website: Mawarid Group

Mawarid Holding is a private Saudi investment company. It was established in 1968 with its headquarters in Suleimania, Riyadh. It manages investments in diversified businesses in financial services, telecommunications, satellite television and radio network, construction, general distribution and trading, catering and restaurants.

== Major investments ==
- Arabian Inspection and Survey
- Carton Products Company
- Eastern Catering
- Mawarid Construction Company
- Mawarid Electronics
- Mawarid International Company
- Mawarid Marketing Company
- Medical Equipment and Supplies
- Madeed properties
- Mawarid Overseas Company
  - Iridium Africa Company
- MEED Trading Company
  - MEED Trading Company - (220+ C-Stores)
  - MEED Express - First Vending Operator in Saudi
- Mawarid Food Company
  - Saudi Agricultural Development Company
- Mawarid Gida Ticaret A.S.
- Mawarid Services
  - Mawarid Services Company
- Mawarid Trading Company (Saudi)
  - Mawarid Trading Kuwait
  - Mawarid Trading Qatar
  - Mawarid Trading UAE
  - Mawarid Trading Oman
  - Mawarid Trading Lebanon
  - Mawarid Trading Bahrain
- Mawarid Investments Company
- Digital Media Systems [DMS]
  - Orbit Communications Company (formerly)
  - OSN (39.5% stake)
  - Digital Technology Systems
  - International Production and Distribution Services
- Amex (Middle East)
- Saudi Chemical Company
- Saudi Arabian Amiantit Company
- Arab Commercial Enterprises
- Bayn Consortium
- Integrated Telecom Company
- Mawarid Marocaine
- Petro-Hunt Middle East
- Saudi Polyester Products
- Digital Transformation
  - Advanced Technology Solutions (ATSS)
  - Interactive Smart Communications (ISC)
  - Interactive Smart Financials (ISF)
