= OSN Sports =

Pan Arab network of sports channels

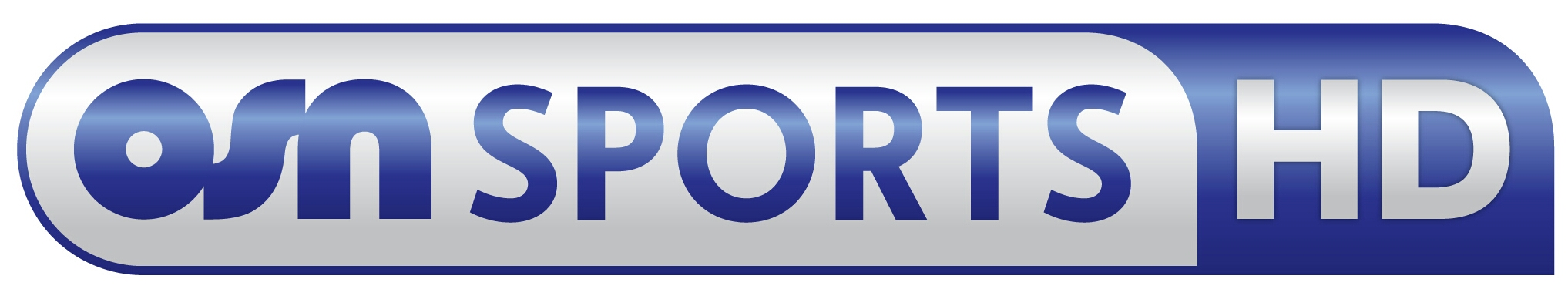
- Country: United Arab Emirates
- Broadcast area: Middle East; North Africa
- Headquarters: Dubai Media City, Dubai, UAE

Programming
- Language(s): English
- Picture format: 16:9 (1080i, HDTV)

Ownership
- Owner: Orbit Showtime Network
- Sister channels: OSN Movies; OSN Yahala; OSN News

History
- Launched: 16 April 2007; 17 years ago
- Closed: OSN Sports Action 1 31 March 2019; 5 years ago OSN Sports Action 2 31 March 2019; 5 years ago OSN Sports 3 31 March 2019; 5 years ago OSN Sports 4 31 March 2019; 5 years ago OSN Sports 5 31 March 2019; 5 years ago OSN Sports Cricket 31 March 2019; 5 years ago OSN WWE Network 31 March 2019; 5 years ago OSN Fight Network 16 January 2018; 7 years ago OSN Cric 15 July 2019; 5 years ago
- Replaced by: OSN Cric (Cricket); OSN Cinema (PPV)
- Former names: ShowSports

Links
- Website: OSN Sports

OSN Sports (formerly known as ShowSports) was a Pan Arab satellite sports television network owned by Orbit Showtime Network. First launched in early April 2007, it operated eight HD channels: OSN Sports Action 1, OSN Sports Action 2, OSN Sports 3, OSN Sports 4, OSN Sports 5, OSN Sports Cricket, OSN WWE Network and OSN Fight Network.

On March 31, 2019, all OSN Sports channels were shut down. OSN continued to broadcast cricket on a new channel, OSN Cric. On July 15, 2019, OSN Cric was shut down.

== Channels ==
=== OSN Sports Action 1 ===
Offers coverage of separate sports events.

=== OSN Sports Action 2 ===
Broadcasts WWE Raw, WWE SmackDown Live, Rugby World Cup, National Rugby League, Super League, Australian Football League and International Cricket.

=== OSN Sports 3 ===
Broadcasts live cricket matches, I-League, PKL, HIL notably The Ashes series, IPL, rugby and golf action through shows and highlights and reruns of WWE Smackdown.

=== OSN Sports 4 ===
Specialized in WWE as it airs WWE NXT, WWE Bottom Line and WWE Vintage Collection. It also features extreme sports such as UFC, Slamball, Monster Jam and Airsport World, in addition to Monster Garage.

=== OSN WWE Network ===
On February 12, 2015, WWE announced a five-year partnership with OSN to bring the WWE Network to the Middle East and North Africa as a premium service.

== See also ==
- Orbit Showtime Network
- OSN Movies
- OSN Yahala
- OSN News
