= Satelio =

- Industry: Pay television
- Founded: July 2013; 12 years ago
- Headquarters: Ismaning, Germany
- Area served: Sub-Saharan Africa (Africa excluding North Africa)
- Products: Satellite television
- Owner: Deutscher Televisionsklub Betriebs GmbH
- Website: www.satelio.tv

Satelio is a pay-tv service for German-language television in Southern Africa (especially Namibia as well in South Africa (under the Deukom label), other African countries (Nigeria since October 1, 2015) and the Middle East. Satelio is provided by Deutscher Televisionsklub Betriebs GmbH based in Ismaning, Germany.

== Distribution ==
Satelio broadcast its offer via the Amos-5 satellite (from 2 December 2013 to early June 2014 via Intelsat 20). Due to the failure of Amos-5 on November 21, 2015, the move to the Astra 4A satellite at 5° east was announced on November 23, 2015 and completed on November 24, 2015.

In Namibia, the broadcast takes place via the general broadcasting license of Hitradio Namibia, in Nigeria via ACTV.

== Channels ==
=== TV ===
- Das Erste (available in Namibia and South Africa only)
- ZDF (available in Namibia and South Africa only)
- 3sat (available in Namibia and South Africa only)
- arte (available in Namibia and South Africa only)
- DW-TV (DW Deutsch)
- RTL Television
- RTL II
- Sat.1
- ProSieben
- VOX
- n-tv
- kabel eins
- Puls 4
- Heimatkanal
- Romance TV
- Nitro
- Super RTL
- ProSieben Maxx
- sixx
- Jukebox
- auto motor und sport channel/N24 (time-sharing)
- Fix und Foxi TV

The five English-language sports channels (ST Sports Premium HD, ST World Football HD, ST Sports Arena, ST Sports Life and ST Sports Focus) are offered in cooperation with the South African pay-tv company StarSat since September 1, 2016 and are subject to a surcharge. Among other things, Satelio offers the transmission of live coverage of Bundesliga football matches with this sports package.

=== Radio ===
- Bayern 1
- Bayern 3
- Klassik Radio
- Hitradio Namibia
- Antenne Bayern
- Radio Paloma
- Rock Antenne
- harmony.fm
- radio ffn
- sunshine live

== Encryption ==
Panaccess is used as a conditional-access system.
