= Showtime Arabia =

Showtime Networks Middle East division

- Final logo, used from 1 April 2007 relaunch to 2009 merger
- Type: Joint venture
- Industry: Telecommunication
- Founded: March 1996; 30 years ago
- Defunct: 12 July 2009; 17 years ago
- Fate: Spun off from CBS Corporation's 21% stake and merged with Orbit Communications Company
- Successor: Orbit Showtime Network
- Headquarters: Dubai Media City, Dubai, United Arab Emirates
- Area served: Middle East and North Africa
- Key people: Faisal Al Ayar (Chairman); Marc Antoine d’Halluin (CEO)
- Products: Direct broadcast satellite
- Owners: KIPCO (1996–2009; 79%); Viacom (1996–2005; 21%); CBS Corporation (2005–2009; 21%)
- Website: ShowtimeArabia.com

Showtime Arabia was Showtime Networks pay television service in the Middle East and North Africa. It was a joint venture between Kuwaiti holding company KIPCO (79% stake) and American media firm Viacom Inc. (21% stake). The company was incorporated in the Cayman Islands and had its headquarters at Dubai Media City in Dubai, United Arab Emirates.

Showtime Arabia was one of three Pay TV networks in the Middle East and North Africa, it offered motion pictures, sporting events and original content, some of which was localized. It had the exclusive rights to broadcast the Barclays Premier League in the Middle East and North Africa. On 12 July 2009, the company announced a merger with competitor Orbit Communications Company to form Orbit Showtime Network (OSN).

== History ==
The company was created in March 1996 by KIPCO and the original Viacom using the trade name Gulf DTH; the following month, it entered an agreement with NetHold to distribute its channels using MultiChoice's technology. Regular broadcasts began on analog satellite in September 1996.

== Technical ==
When Showtime launched, some of its channels included TMC, MTV, VH1, Nickelodeon, TV Land, Paramount, Style, Discovery and Hallmark. Gulf DTH F.Z. L.L.C. was the operating company behind the digital pay TV broadcaster, Showtime Arabia. Its broadcast facilities were based at Dubai Media City in the United Arab Emirates and its uplink teleport station is Samacom, the monopoly uplink provider in the UAE. Showtime Arabia used Irdeto Access Conditional Access technology to encrypt its DTH (Direct-to-Home) channels over satellite and the OpenTV interactive platform that runs on primarily UEC Multi-Media set-top boxes.

== Merger with Orbit ==
On 12 July 2009, Showtime Arabia and Orbit Communications Company announced a merger that created the "biggest Pay-TV platform" in the Middle East and North Africa.

The newly formed company is an equal partnership that would offer seventy exclusive channels featuring new movies, sports, series, Arabic content and international shows.

New customers can subscribe to packages featuring Showtime Arabia's and Orbit's programs, while existing subscribers will be able to either retain or upgrade their content. The company will offer HD channels, video on demand and other interactive services.

== Showtime Arabia channel lineup ==
Showtime Arabia channels (2008)^{*}
Category	Channel(s)			
Promotional & Free to air channels	Showtime Promotional channel (before ShowToday), ShowToday, OSN Promotional channel, Showtime Mosaic			
Documentary channels	Animal Planet	Discovery Science	Discovery World	Nat Geo Wild
Documentary channels	Nat Geo Adventure			
General Entertainment channels	ShowComedy	ShowComedy Extra	ShowSeries	ShowSeries Extra
General Entertainment channels	ShowShasha	BBC Lifestyle	BBC Prime	Super Comedy
General Entertainment channels	America Plus	E!	Universal Channel	Syfy Universal
General Entertainment channels	Fashion TV	Travel Channel	Showtime Maghreb	
Kids channels	Boomerang	Cartoon Network	Disney Channel	Toon Disney
Kids channels	JimJam (04–16 UTC)	BabyFirstTV	Nickelodeon	ShowKids
Movie channels	ShowMovies 1	ShowMovies 2	ShowMovies Action	
Movie channels	ShowMovies Comedy	ShowMovies Kids	Hallmark Channel	Turner Classic Movies
Music channels	MTV Music	VH1		
News channels	Bloomberg Television	CNN International	CNBC Europe	Sky News
Pay-per-view channels	ShowCinema TVMAX 1	ShowCinema TVMAX 2	ShowCinema TVMAX 3	
Sports channels	ShowSports 1	ShowSports 2	ShowSports 3	ShowSports 4
Sports channels	Extreme Sports Channel			
High definition	Showtime HD			

* 43 channels** + 1 promotional channel
** 12 general entertainment channels, seven movie channels, five sports channels, five documentary channels, five kids channels, four pay-per-view channels, three music channels, and three news channels

== See also ==
- Showtime around the world
- Orbit Communications Company
- Orbit Showtime Network (OSN)
