= Quest Arabiya =

Emirati pan-Arab television channel

Quest Arabiya كوست عربية
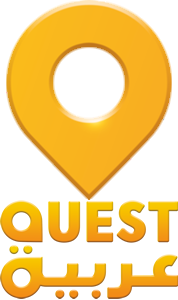
- Broadcast area: Middle East and North Africa (excluding Israel)
- Headquarters: Abu Dhabi, United Arab Emirates

Programming
- Language(s): Arabic; English (SAP audio)
- Picture format: 576i (SDTV); 1080i (HDTV)

Ownership
- Owner: Discovery Networks CEEMEA; Image Nation
- Sister channels: Discovery Channel; Discovery Science; Discovery Family; Investigation Discovery Xtra; Animal Planet; Fatafeat; DTX; DLife; DMAX; DKids; TLC

History
- Launched: 7 December 2015; 9 years ago
- Closed: 1 May 2019; 5 years ago

Links
- Website: questarabiya.com

Quest Arabiya (Arabic: عربية Quest) was a free-to-air pan-Arab television channel. The channel was launched on 7 December 2015 across the Middle East and North Africa region. It was the region's localized version of the Quest UK channel. The channel was owned by Discovery Communications in partnership with the Abu Dhabi–based Image Nation.

Focusing primarily on factual and reality-based programming, Quest Arabiya broadcast for 24 hours a day and was expected to reach an estimated 45 million households across 22 countries. The channel was targeted toward a wide demographic of Arabic-speaking males and females while specifically targeting males 16+ at key times in the schedule.

Content from Discovery's library of factual entertainment shows have been voice-over translated into Arabic. Soon afterward, an English track was launched, allowing viewers to watch the programs in their original language without voice-over translation into Arabic.

On 24 April 2019, the channel announced on their Facebook page that the channel will cease broadcasting on 1 May 2019 without giving a reason.

The channel ceased operations on 1 May 2019.

== Programming ==
- American Chopper
- Animal's Guide to Survival
- Back to the Village
- Build It Bigger
- Chop Shop: London Garage
- Destroyed in Seconds
- Dual Survival
- Everest: Beyond the Limit
- How It's Made
- I (Almost) Got Away with It
- Into Alaska with Jeff Corwin
- Lone Target
- My Cat from Hell
- New York: Inside Out
- NextWorld
- Off the Hook: Extreme Catches
- The Pop Illusionist
- Ultimate Survival
- Wheeler Dealers: Trading Up
- Yukon Men
