= GMA Life TV =

24-hour Philippine pay television channel

- Country: Philippines
- Broadcast area: International
- Network: GMA Network; GTV
- Headquarters: GMA Network Center EDSA cor. Timog Ave., Diliman, Quezon City, Philippines

Programming
- Languages: Filipino; English
- Picture format: 720p/1080p HDTV (downscaled to 16:9 480i/576i for the SDTV feed)

Ownership
- Owner: GMA Network, Inc.
- Parent: GMA International
- Sister channels: GMA Network; GTV; Heart of Asia Channel; I Heart Movies; GMA Pinoy TV; GMA News TV

History
- Launched: February 16, 2008; 18 years ago

Links
- Website: gmalifetv.com

Availability

Terrestrial
- Zuku TV (Kenya): Channel 146
- SingTel TV (Singapore): Channel 689

GMA Life TV is a 24-hour Philippine pay television channel owned by GMA Network, Inc. It was launched on February 16, 2008.

== Programming ==
Programming consists mostly of shows from GMA Network and GTV as well as previously aired shows, documentaries, cooking shows, travelogues, films and sports events from the Philippines. Most weekend shows are up to date, with the exception of some shows that air on a one-episode delay basis.

== History ==
The channel carries programming from GMA Network and GTV. It was launched on February 16, 2008, in Japan and is available in the Middle East and North Africa through OSN and My-HD.

In June 2008 it was launched in Australia and New Zealand on UBI World TV. It is now also available in the whole United States via Dish Network and DirecTV.

On November 2, 2009, it was launched in Hawaii via Oceanic Time Warner Cable as a video on demand channel.

The channel was launched in Singapore on SingTel in June 2013.

On April 26, 2023, ABS-CBN Corporation and GMA Network, Inc. announced that GMA Life TV will be available on ABS-CBN's iWantTFC for viewers outside of the Philippines on May 1 alongside GMA Pinoy TV and GMA News TV.

== See also ==
- GMA Network
- GMA Pinoy TV
- GMA News TV International
- GTV
- Overseas Filipino
