= OSN Movies =

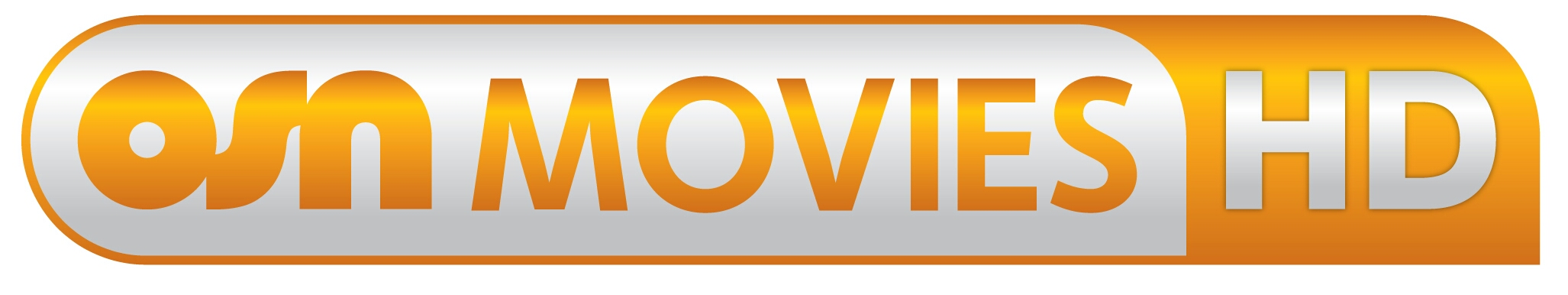
- Country: Dubai, United Arab Emirates

Ownership
- Owner: OSN Network
- Sister channels: OSN News; OSN Sports

History
- Launched: 1996

Links
- Website: osn.com

OSN Movies is a series of premium movie channels provided by OSN for the Middle East and North African market. The channels include content such as the latest Hollywood films of various genres from major companies such as Disney, 20th Century Studios, Warner Bros., Sony Pictures Entertainment, Universal Pictures, Metro-Goldwyn-Mayer, and DreamWorks Animation.

== List of OSN Movie channels ==
- OSNtv Movies Hollywood
- OSNtv Movies Action
- OSNtv Movies Horror
- OSNtv Movies Premiere
- OSNtv Movies Comedy
- OSNtv Kids
- OSNtv Movies Family

== See also ==
- OSN
- OSN Sports
- OSN News
