= Dr. Panda =

Chinese video game developer

- Native name: 熊貓博士
- Type: Private
- Industry: Mobile games
- Founded: 2011; 15 years ago
- Founder: Thijs Bosma; Yan Lin
- Headquarters: Chengdu, China
- Area served: Worldwide
- Key people: Thijs Bosma; (CEO & Founder); Lin Yan; (COO & Co-founder); Tom Buyckx; (Chief Marketing Officer)
- Number of employees: 50
- Website: drpanda.com

Dr. Panda (formerly TribePlay, Chinese: 熊貓博士) is a Chinese video game developer that creates educational applications for children on smartphones and tablets. The company is based in Chengdu, China. The company's series of Dr. Panda games includes role-playing apps aimed at children ages 2 to 5. The games are available on platforms including iOS, Android, and Windows Phone.

== History ==
Dr. Panda expanded into 3D graphics with the release of Dr. Panda Home in 2013. It was listed as one of The Guardian's Best 20 Android Apps of the Week in 2013.
