= TLC Arabia =

- Broadcast area: Middle East and North Africa

Programming
- Picture format: 1080i HDTV

Ownership
- Owner: Warner Bros. Discovery
- Sister channels: Discovery Channel; Discovery Science; Discovery Family; Investigation Discovery; Animal Planet; Fatafeat; DTX; DLife; DMAX; DKids; Quest Arabiya

History
- Launched: 24 March 2014; 11 years ago

Links
- Website: Facebook.com/TLCArabia

TLC Arabia is a regional branch channel of the TLC network broadcasting in the Middle East and North Africa (MENA) region. The channel was launched on 24 March 2014.

== Original programming ==
- Nida'a (Arabic: نداء, or The Calling) – a women-focused talk show hosted by Zainab Salbi
- My World to You º a travel show hosted by Darine Al Khatib
