= OSN News =

- Logo (2020-2022)
- Country: Manama, Bahrain

Programming
- Picture format: 16:9 (1080i, HD)

Ownership
- Owner: OSN Network
- Sister channels: OSN Movies; OSN Sports

History
- Launched: 1997
- Closed: 31 December 2025
- Former names: Orbit News (1997-2011)

OSN News was a 24-hour satellite channel offering exclusively American news programming from NBC, and MSNBC to U.S. expatriates, primarily geared towards an audience in the Arab countries. The channel is available on OSN Network in Middle East and North Africa.

== Background ==
OSN News offers live coverage from major U.S. news networks NBC and MSNBC such as NBC's Today are followed by news magazine programs, documentaries, and financial shows. World, business, technology and entertainment news and weather from MSNBC is also offered.

OSN News is broadcast by Orbit Showtime Network, a major pay television service in the Middle East and North Africa. In 2009 two new channels were launched, Orbit News 2 and Orbit News 3, offering extended coverage of American news from MSNBC and NBC. These two services were taken off air during the fall 2010 at the same time the main channel changed names from Orbit News to OSN News.

== NBC and MSNBC shows on OSN News ==
Program	Original broadcast network
NBC Nightly News	NBC
The Today Show	NBC
Weekend Today Show	NBC
Early Today	NBC
Morning Joe	MSNBC
MSNBC Reports	MSNBC
MTP Daily	MSNBC
The Beat with Ari Melber	MSNBC
All In with Chris Hayes	MSNBC
The Rachel Maddow Show	MSNBC
The Last Word with Lawrence O'Donnell	MSNBC
The 11th Hour with Brian Williams	MSNBC
Inside with Jen Psaki	MSNBC
José Díaz-Balart Reports	MSNBC

== OSN News Logos ==
1997 - 2010

2010 - 2011

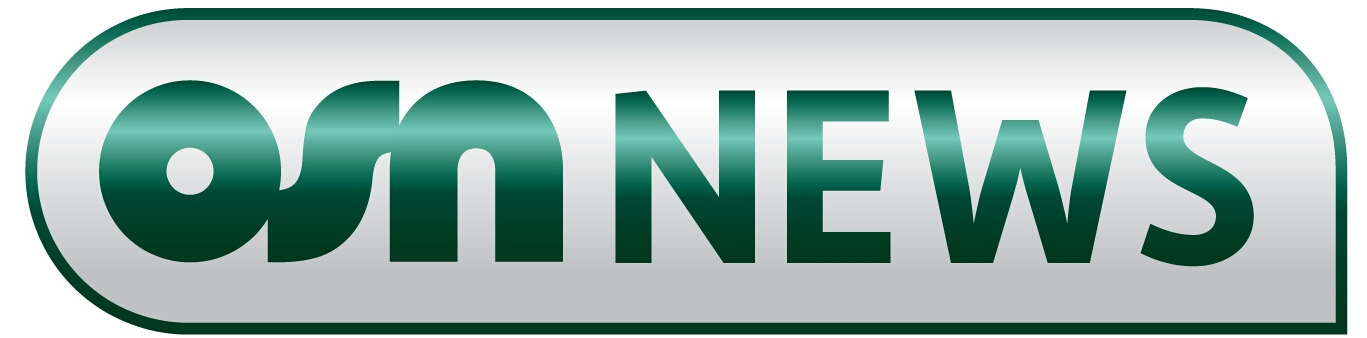
2013 - 2017

== See also ==
- OSN
- OSN Movies
- OSN Sports
