= Bahrain Lawal =

Bahraini government broadcaster

- Type: Government business
- Country: Bahrain
- Network: Arabsat, Eutelsat

Ownership
- Owner: Bahrain Radio and Television Corporation

History
- Launched: 2019

Bahrain Lawal (Arabic: البحرين لوّل) is a Bahraini government broadcaster. It broadcasts from the headquarters of the Bahrain Radio and Television Corporation, located in Isa Town.
