= Hitradio Namibia =

Coordinates: 22.590104°S 17.090833°E

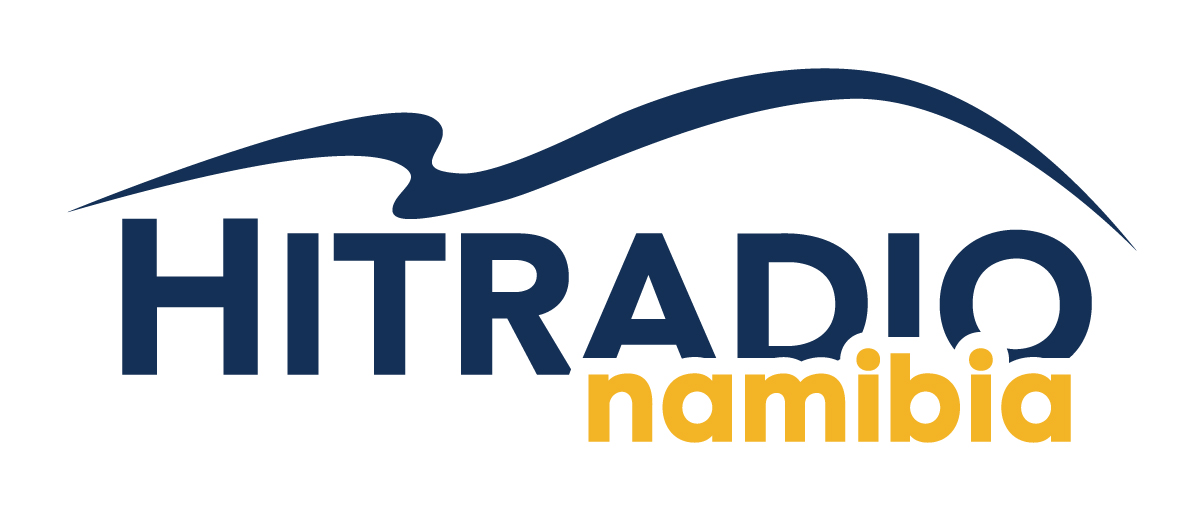

Windhoek; Namibia
- Broadcast area: Windhoek & surrounds Central Coast & surrounds Grootfontein; Lüderitz; Otjiwarongo; Tsumeb; Livestream; Satellite

Programming
- Language: German
- Format: Adult contemporary

Ownership
- Owner: Hitradio Namibia CC

History
- First air date: August 1, 2012

Links
- Website: Hitradio Namibia

Hitradio Namibia is the first and only German language private radio station in Namibia. The station went on air on August 1, 2012. Owners were the German Namibians Wilfried Hähner and Sybille Rothkegel, and since August 2020 Sybille Moldzio and Kai-Uwe Schonecke.

The station was from 2012 to 2014 and is since February 2020 located at Maerua Mall in Windhoek. In between, Hitradio Namibia broadcast from its own broadcasting centre in Windhoek-Suiderhof.

Hitradio Namibia targets the German speaking audience in Namibia and abroad.

- Windhoek and surrounds: FM 99.5
- Central Coast (e.g. Swakopmund, Walvis Bay): 97.5
- Lüderitz: 97.5
- Otjiwarongo: 90.0
- Tsumeb and Grootfontein: 90.4
