= KIPCO =

Investment and holding company in Kuwait

Kuwait Projects Company (Holding)
- Type: Public
- Industry: Holding company
- Founded: 2 August 1975 as Kuwait Investment Projects Company
- Headquarters: KIPCO Tower, Khalid Bin Al Waleed Street, Sharq, Kuwait City
- Area served: GCC & MENA Region
- Products: Commercial banking, petrochemical & oil services, foodstuff, asset management & investment banking, media, real estate, healthcare, logistics and education
- Revenue: ▲US$ 4.2 billion (2023)
- Net income: ▲US$ 98 million (2023)
- Total assets: ▲US$ 40.1 billion (2023)
- Total equity: ▲US$ 2 billion (2023)
- Number of employees: 16000
- Website: www.kipco.com 29°22′33″N 47°59′11″E

Kuwait Projects Company (Holding), known as KIPCO, is an investment holding company in the Middle East and North Africa (MENA) region. KIPCO, with consolidated assets of $40.1 billion as of 31 December 2023, operates in 20+ countries across multiple industries. KIPCO is a multi-sector operator with portfolio companies in commercial banking, petrochemical & oil services, foodstuff, asset management & investment banking, media, real estate, healthcare, logistics, and education.

== History ==
KIPCO was incorporated on 2 August 1975 under Article 94 of the Kuwaiti Commercial Companies Code, Law No. 15 1960. Since incorporation, the company has grown and made investments in a diversified portfolio of companies operating throughout the Gulf Cooperation Council (GCC) and the wider Middle East and North Africa (MENA) region.

In March 2007, Qatar Telecom (Qtel) agreed with KIPCO to acquire a 51% stake in Wataniya Telecom for $3.72 billion.

In March 2022, KIPCO and Qurain Petrochemical Industries Company (QPIC) signed an agreement to assess a merger. The merger was completed in November 2022 at a swap ratio of 2.24 KIPCO shares for each QPIC share, and the merged company trades on Boursa Kuwait under the ticker KPROJ.

In December 2023, KIPCO completed the sale of its 46.32% stake in Gulf Insurance Group to a Fairfax Financial group company for a net value of KD 256.5 million (US$832 million).
