= GMA Pinoy TV =

Philippine pay television channel

- Country: Philippines
- Broadcast area: International
- Network: GMA Network
- Headquarters: GMA Network Center EDSA cor. Timog Ave., Diliman, Quezon City, Philippines

Programming
- Languages: Filipino; English
- Picture format: 720p/1080p HDTV (downscaled to 16:9 480i/576i for the SDTV feed)

Ownership
- Owner: GMA Network, Inc.
- Parent: GMA International
- Sister channels: GMA Network; GTV; Heart of Asia Channel; I Heart Movies; GMA Life TV; GMA News TV

History
- Launched: March 2005; 21 years ago

Links
- Website: GMA Pinoy TV

Availability

Terrestrial
- Zuku TV (Kenya): Channel 148
- SingTel TV (Singapore): Channel 688

GMA Pinoy TV is a Philippine pay television channel that was launched in March 2005, by GMA Network. Operated by its subsidiaries, GMA International and GMA Worldwide Inc, it is targeted towards the Filipino diaspora.

== Programming ==
The programming of GMA Pinoy TV consists mostly of shows from the Philippines from GMA Network as well as previously aired shows, documentaries, films, and sports events from the Philippines. It also aired a simulcast of ABS-CBN Studios' It's Showtime with TFC and AMBS' All TV. Most weekend shows are up to date, with the exception of some shows that air on a one-episode delay basis.

== History ==
GMA Pinoy TV was first launched in March 2005 in Japan. It was later launched in several parts of the United States in the same year, such as San Francisco, Los Angeles, and the states of the East Coast. The channel was launched in San Francisco on July 23, 2005.

A second channel, GMA Life TV, was successfully launched on February 16, 2008 and soon grew to 109,000 subscribers. GMA Pinoy TV had 225,000 subscribers as of September 2009. The percent of subscribers has gone up 34% according to GMA New Media, Inc.

In December 2010, both GMA Pinoy TV and GMA Life TV has expanded its coverage area in the US to Chicago, Illinois, New York, Washington, D.C., Maryland, Alabama and Virginia, and internationally to Canada, Italy, the United Kingdom and Europe.

In 2011, the channels were launched in Australia and Papua New Guinea.

On October 5, 2011, GMA Pinoy TV accepted two awards from the National Association for Multi-Ethnicity in Communications (NAMIC) in New York for 2011 Excellence in Multicultural Marketing Awards.

On April 26, 2023, ABS-CBN Corporation and GMA Network, Inc. announced that GMA Pinoy TV will be available on ABS-CBN's iWantTFC (now iWant) for viewers outside of the Philippines on May 1 alongside GMA News TV and GMA Life TV.

== See also ==
- GMA Network
- GMA Life TV
- GMA News TV International
- The Filipino Channel
- Kapatid TV5 Channel
