= OSN =

Emirati media and entertainment company

- Logo used since 2020
- Formerly: Orbit Showtime Network (2009–2013)
- Type: Private
- Industry: Media; Entertainment
- Predecessors: Orbit Communications Company; Showtime Arabia
- Founded: 12 July 2009; 17 years ago in Dubai, UAE
- Area served: Middle East and North Africa (MENA)
- Key people: Sheikha Dana Nasser Sabah Al Ahmad Al Sabah (Chairwoman); Joe Kawkabani (Group CEO)
- Products: Streaming media; Satellite television
- Services: OSN+; OSNtv
- Owners: KIPCO (60.5%); Mawarid Holding (39.5%)
- Parent: Panther Media Group
- Website: www.osn.com

OSN (formerly Orbit Showtime Network) is a media and entertainment company based in the Middle East and North Africa (MENA) region, headquartered in Dubai, United Arab Emirates. Formed in 2009 through the merger of Orbit Communications Company and Showtime Arabia, the company provides a direct-broadcast satellite service, OSNtv, and a video streaming service, OSN+. The company is owned and operated by Panther Media Group, a holding company registered in the Dubai International Financial Centre (DIFC). Panther Media Group is a joint venture between Kuwait Projects Company (KIPCO) and the Saudi Arabian-based Mawarid Group.

== History ==
OSN was established on 12 July 2009 following the merger of two of the MENA region's largest pay-TV operators: Showtime Arabia and Orbit Communications Company.

In November 2023, OSN announced a merger between its streaming service, OSN+, and the music streaming platform Anghami. Completed in April 2024, the transaction resulted in OSN Group taking a 55.45% majority stake in Anghami. The deal valued OSN+ at $365 million and Anghami at $139 million. Elie Habib, Anghami's co-founder, was appointed CEO of the combined entity, which consolidated over 120 million registered users, 18,000 hours of video content, and 100 million audio tracks.

On 24 March 2025, Warner Bros. Discovery acquired a minority stake in OSN's streaming subsidiary, further expanding the long-standing content partnership that makes OSN the exclusive regional distributor for HBO and other Warner Bros. Discovery properties.

== Availability ==
The company's broadcast and streaming services are available across 18 markets in the MENA region, including the Gulf Cooperation Council states of Bahrain, Kuwait, Oman, Qatar, Saudi Arabia, and the United Arab Emirates; the Levant countries of Iraq, Jordan, Lebanon, and Palestine; and the North African countries of Algeria, Sudan, Egypt, Libya, Mauritania, Morocco, and Tunisia as well as Yemen.

== Services ==
=== OSNtv ===
OSNtv logo

OSN operates a range of pay television channels through its direct-broadcast satellite service. Its proprietary channels are mainly branded under the "OSNtv" name and include movie, entertainment, and Arabic-language channels such as OSNtv Movies, OSNtv Showcase and OSNtv Yahala.

In addition to its original broadcast channels, the OSN package serves as a major regional distributor for numerous international third-party networks across the MENA region. Its channel lineup includes children's, factual, news, lifestyle, and gaming channels, including Nickelodeon, Cartoon Network, Discovery Channel, History, CNN, Bloomberg Television, TLC Arabia, and Ginx TV.

OSN also offers specialized subscription packages, including the Alfa package, which features Arabic-language entertainment channels, and the Pinoy package, which provides Filipino channels from broadcasters such as TFC, GMA, and Kapatid TV5, as well as coverage of the Philippine Basketball Association (PBA).

=== OSN+ ===
OSN+ logo

OSN's direct-to-consumer streaming platform initially launched in August 2017 as Wavo. It was rebranded to OSN+ in March 2022 as a subscription-based video-on-demand service.

OSN maintains exclusive regional licensing agreements with major international studios. In January 2022, OSN renewed its contract with HBO, retaining its status as the sole MENA carrier for HBO programming. Concurrently, the platform integrated content from Peacock and Sky Studios through an expanded deal with NBCUniversal. OSN also holds licensing agreements with Endeavor Content and All3Media.

Alongside licensed programming, OSN+ produces original Arabic-language content under the "OSN Originals" label, including a localized adaptation of the American legal drama Suits.
