= List of Philippine television shows =

Philippine television shows from past to present

Here is the list of Philippine television shows categorised into its respective genres.

== Arts and culture ==
- Art Academy (2023–present; Net 25)
- Art Angel (2004–2011; GMA)
- Art Is Kool (2002–2004; GMA, 2004–2005; ABC)
- Art Jam (2004–2005; ABS-CBN)
- Artsy Craftsy (2024–present; PTV)
- CameraGeekTV: Pinoy Best Shot (2012–2014; PTV)
- Dayaw (2016–2021; ANC)
- Dayaw: Rediscovering Traditions (2024–present; PTV)
- DepEd TV (2020–2022; IBC)
- DokyuBata TV (2022–2023; IBC)
- Don't Give Up (2020; INC TV)
- ETC HQ (2012–2013; ETC)
- Etcetera (2011–2015; ETC)
- Footprints (2010–2012; Net 25)
- Hometown: Dito Po Sa Amin (2003–2004; UNTV)
  - Hometown: Doon Po Sa Amin (2007–2008; UNTV)
- Kahanga-hangang Pilipinas (2014–2015; PTV)
- Kalye Sining (2025–present; IBC)
- Maaram (2025–present; PTV)
- Mag TV Na (2008–2018; ABS-CBN Regional)
- NCCT Originals (2023; IBC)
- Noypi, Ikaw Ba To? (2006–2008; ABS-CBN)
- Padayon: The NCAA Hour (2022–2023; PTV/IBC)
- Sagisag Kultura TV (2025; PTV)
- Silip: Sining at Lipunan (2004; ABS-CBN)
- Sining Gising: NCCA Ugnayan sa Tinig ng Bayan (2007–2011; NBN)
- Siyensikat (2024–2025; PTV, 2025–present; GTV)
- Tayo-Tayo (2019–2020; One PH)
- Tele-Aralan ng Kakayahan (1980–1989; MBS/PTV)
- Tipong Pinoy (1998–1999; GMA, 2003–2004; Studio 23, 2010–2015; IBC)

== Child-and/or youth-oriented ==
- 5 and Up (1992–1994, 2002–2003; ABC, 1994–2002; GMA)
- 10 Minutes of Science (2019–2023; PTV)
- Abakada Barkada (PTV/IBC)
- AgriKids (2022–present; Kapamilya Channel/A2Z)
- Ang Galing Mo Bata (1992–1994; IBC)
- Ang Mahiwagang Baul (2005–2007; GMA)
- Ang Mutya ng Section E (2025; Viva One/TV5)
- Ang Say ng Kabataan (A.S.K.) (2006–2008; NBN)
- Ang TV (1992–1997; ABS-CBN)
- ATBP: Awit, Titik at Bilang na Pambata (1994–1998; ABS-CBN)
- Awana at Home (2021–present; Light TV)
- Bagets: Just Got Lucky (2011–2012; TV5)
- Bagito (2014–2015; ABS-CBN)
- Basta Barkada (1989–1995; RPN/New Vision 9)
- Batang Batibot (1999–2001; GMA)
- Batang Kaharian (2003–2022; SMNI)
- Batibot (1984–1991; RPN/New Vision 9, 1984–1991, 1994–1995; PTV, 1991–1994; ABS-CBN, 1995–1999; GMA, 2010–2013; TV5)
- Bayani (1995–2002; ABS-CBN)
- Berks (2002–2004; ABS-CBN)
- BFGF (2010–2011; TV5)
- BLOG (Barkada Log) (Studio 23)
- Bread N' Butter (2004–2005, 2008–2016; UNTV)
- Bread Tambayan (2007–2011; UNTV)
- Buttercup (2003–2004; ABS-CBN)
- Campus Break (1988–1989; IBC)
- Candies (2005–2006; QTV)
- Chikiting Patrol (1988–1989; ABS-CBN, 1989–1990; IBC, 1990–2002; GMA, 2002–2006; ABC)
- Children's Church Online (2020–present; Light TV)
- Chill Spot (2008–2009; ETC)
- Click (1999–2004; GMA)
- Constel (1995–1998; PTV)
- Daig Kayo ng Lola Ko (2017–present; GMA, 2023–present; GTV, 2023–2024; Pinoy Hits)
- Dear Heart (1998–1999; IBC)
- Details 0923 (1997–1998; IBC)
- DOSTv: Science for the People (2016–2020; GNN/One Media, 2017–2020; PTV)
- Epol/Apple (1999–2004; ABS-CBN)
- Eskwela ng Bayan (2002–2003; NBN, 2003; RPN)
- Expertalk (2024; PTV, 2025; GTV)
- Five and a Half (2007–2008; Studio 23)
- Flames (1996–2002; ABS-CBN)
- FNRI Puppet Videos (2011; IBC)
- For Kids Only (1994–2000; ABS-CBN, 2000–2002; RPN)
- Funfare (1977–1989; IBC)
- Fun with Math (1997–2001; PTV)
- G-mik (1999–2002; ABS-CBN)
  - Gimik (1996–1999; ABS-CBN)
  - Gimik 2010 (2010; ABS-CBN)
- Generation K (2019–2020; SMNI)
- Goin' Bulilit (2005–2019; ABS-CBN, 2024; Kapamilya Channel/A2Z/All TV)
- Good Vibes (2011; ABS-CBN)
- G.R.I.N.D. Get Ready It's a New Day (2017; GMA)
- Growing Up (1997–1999; GMA)
- Growing Up (2011–2012; ABS-CBN)
- H2K: Hati-Hating Kapatid (2000–2001; IBC)
- Happy Land (2009–2010; GMA)
- He's Into Her (2021–2022; iWantTFC/Kapamilya Channel/A2Z)
- Hero City Kids Force (2021–2022; iWantTFC, 2022–2023; Kapamilya Channel/A2Z)
- Hi-5 Philippines (2015–2016; TV5)
- Hiraya Manawari (1995–2003; ABS-CBN)
- Homework (2015–2019; Net 25)
- HushHush (2008; TV5)
- I Got It! (2010–2013; ABS-CBN/Studio 23)
- INC Kids Adventures (2022–present; INC TV)
- INC Kids Corner (2014–present; INC TV)
- J12 Kids (2020–2023; Light TV)
- Jet and the Pet Rangers (2020; iWant)
- Jollitown (2008–2010; GMA, 2011–2012; ABS-CBN)
- Joyride (2004–2005; GMA)
- K-High (2010–2013; Studio 23)
- Ka-Blog! (2008–2010; GMA)
- Kaibigan: The Series (2020–2021; GMA)
- Kalye Sining (2025–present; IBC)
- Kaybol: Ang Bagong TV (1997–1999; ABS-CBN)
- Kidcetera (2003; IBC)
- Kiddie Explorers (2023–present; One PH)
- Kiddie Kwela (2008–2010; TV5)
- Kiddie Patrol (2024; Abante TeleTabloid)
- Kidding Aside (1992; IBC)
- Kids Church (2020–present; Light TV)
- Kids HQ (2016–2018; GMA News TV/Light Network, 2018; Light TV)
- Kids on Q (2007–2010; Q)
- Kids TV (2004–2006; RPN, 2006–2007; ABC)
- Kidz Connect (2021–present; Light TV)
- Kidz Rule (2005–2009; Studio 23)
- Klasrum (2011–2016; UNTV)
- KNC Show (2004–2026, 2026–present; UNTV)
- KNN: Kabataan News Network (2004–2008; NBN/ABC)
- Koko Kwik Kwak (1999–2002; GMA)
- Kulit Bulilit (1986–1988; IBC)
- Let's Go! (2006–2007; ABS-CBN)
- Lipgloss (2008–2009; TV5)
- Lola Basyang.com (2015; TV5)
- Lovely Day (2004–2009; GMA)
- Luv U (2012–2016; ABS-CBN)
- Magpuri TV (2023–2024; Light TV)
- Maka (2024–2025; GMA)
  - Maka Lovestream (2025; GMA)
- Math-Tinik (1997–2004; ABS-CBN)
- MathDali (2016–present; Knowledge Channel, 2017–2020; ABS-CBN, 2020–present; Kapamilya Channel)
- Mathematica 2 (2019–2023; PTV)
- Maths Wonderland (2019–2023; PTV)
- Mga Bata Pa Kami (IBC)
- Mga Kuwento ni Lola Basyang (2007; GMA)
- Mind S-Cool TV (2021–2022; One PH)
- OK Ako (2024; GMA)
- One Cubed (2001–2005; ABS-CBN)
- One, Two, Three Mathematics (2019–2023; PTV)
- Ora Engkantada (1986–1990; IBC, 1996–1998; RPN)
- Oyayi (2016–2018; ABS-CBN, 2018; Knowledge Channel, 2023–present; Light TV)
- Pahina (2000–2001; ABS-CBN)
- Parent Experiment (2022; Kapamilya Channel/A2Z/Jeepney TV)
- Penpen De Sarapen (1987–2001; RPN/New Vision 9)
- Pidol's Wonderland (2010–2013; TV5)
- Pin Pin (1990–1992; PTV)
- Popoy Lupoy (2026–present; D8TV)
- Project Loki (2026–present; TV5)
- Q-Lets and Co. (2010; Q)
- Rakista (2008; TV5)
- Rebyu (1998–1999; IBC)
- Road Trip (2012–2016; GMA News TV, 2012–2014; Light TV, 2014–2016; Light Network)
- Road Trip Refueled (2018–2022; Light TV)
- Salam (2006–2007; ABS-CBN)
- Sayanista (2025–present; IBC)
- Sci-pol: Science Serving People (2001–2002; PTV/NBN)
- SCQ Reload (2004–2005; ABS-CBN)
- Seducing Drake Palma (2025; Viva One/TV5)
- Senior High (2023–2024; Kapamilya Channel/A2Z/TV5/Jeepney TV/iWantTFC)
  - High Street (2024; Kapamilya Channel/A2Z/TV5/Jeepney TV/iWantTFC)
- Shout Out: Sigaw ng Kabataan! (2016–2018; GMA News TV)
- Shoutout! (2010–2011; ABS-CBN)
- Sine'skwela (1994–2004, 2009–2010; ABS-CBN, 2007–2009; Studio 23)
- Sirit (2007; ABS-CBN)
- Smart Cookies (1993–1994; IBC)
- Sparkle U (2023–2024; GMA/GTV/Pinoy Hits)
- Sparks Camp (2023–2024; Black Sheep, 2025; All TV/ABS-CBN Entertainment)
- Star Smile Factory (1993–1996; New Vision 9/RPN)
- Storyland (2002–2005; RPN)
- Tabing Ilog (1999–2003; ABS-CBN)
- Talents Academy (produced by DreamGo Productions) (2019–2020, 2023–present; IBC)
- Tara Tena (2003–2004; ABS-CBN)
- Team Yey! (2016–2020; Yey!, 2020–present; Kapamilya Channel/A2Z)
- Teens (2006–2008; ABC)
- Televisions (1992–1993; IBC)
- T.G.I.S. (1995–1999; GMA)
  - Teen Gen (2012–2013; GMA)
- The Jollibee Kids Show (2013; GMA)
- The Rain In España (2023; TV5)
- The Young Once (2007–2009; NBN)
- Tic Tac Boom (1988–1989; IBC)
- Toogs (2008–2009; TV5)
- Tribe (2006–2013, 2014–2019; Net 25)
- Trip Ko 'To! (2004–2005; NBN)
- Tropang Potchi (2009–2011; Q, 2011–2015; GMA)
- TV Wonderland (1994–1995; IBC)
- Tween Hearts (2010–2012; GMA)
- Uncle Bob's Children's Show (1997–2000; RPN)
- Upload (2014; PTV)
- Usapang Kids (2023–present; Light TV)
- Usapang Pamilya (2018–present; Light TV)
- V.U. (1998; IBC)
- Wansapanataym (1997–2005, 2006–2007, 2010–2019; ABS-CBN)
- Wattpad Presents (2014–2017; TV5)
- Word Hub (2016–2017; Net 25)
- Word Hub: Wonders of Word City (2026–present; Net 25)
- Why Not? (2011–2013; ABS-CBN/Studio 23)
- Y Speak (2004–2005; ABS-CBN, 2005–2010; Studio 23, 2026–present; Kapamilya Channel, 2026; All TV)
- Y2K: Yes 2 Kids (1998–2003; IBC)
- Yan Ang Bata (1995–2000; RPN)
- Young Love, Sweet Love (1987–1993; RPN/New Vision 9)
- Young Minds Inspired (2013; PTV, 2014; GMA News TV)
- Youth Alive (2005–2007; RPN)
- Youth Voice (2006–2007; NBN)
- Zoomers (2024; Kapamilya Channel/A2Z/TV5/ABS-CBN Entertainment)

== Comedy ==
- #MichaelAngelo: The Sitcom (2017–2019; GMA News TV)
- 1 for 3 (1997–2001; GMA)
- 13, 14, 15 (1989–1990; IBC)
- 17 Bernard Club (1992–1994; ABC)
- 2½ Daddies (2015; TV5)
- 2 Plus 2 (BBC)
- 2+2=4 (1986–1988; PTV)
- 3-iN-1 (2024–present; Net 25)
- 50 Karats Daw, O Di Ba (IBC)
- Aalog-Alog (2006–2007; ABS-CBN)
- Abangan ang Susunod Na Kabanata (1991–1997; ABS-CBN)
  - Eto Na Ang Susunod Na Kabanata (2001; ABS-CBN)
- Aganda (2026–present; Bilyonaryo News Channel)
- Alabang Girls (1992–1994; ABC)
- Alex & Amie (2019; GMA)
- All Together Now (2003–2004; GMA)
- Ampalaya Chronicles (2020; iWant)
- Andres de Saya (2011; GMA)
- Ang Lola Kong Baduy (BBC)
- Ang Manok ni San Pedro (1987–1991; RPN/New Vision 9/IBC)
- Ang Tanging Ina (2003–2005; ABS-CBN)
- Ang TV (1992–1997; ABS-CBN)
  - Ang TV 2 (2001–2003; ABS-CBN)
- Ano Ba'ng Hanap Mo? (2006–2007; IBC)
- Apartment 153-A (BBC)
- Apple Pie, Patis, Pate, Atbp. (1987–1989; RPN)
- Arekup Video Zonkers (2008–2009; TV5)
- ATM: Anette, Tonyboy & Maria (1993–1994; New Vision 9)
- Attagirl (2001–2002; ABS-CBN)
- Ay, Robot! (2005–2007; QTV/Q)
- Ayos Lang, Pare Ko (1977; RPN)
- Ayos Lang, Tsong! (1988–1990; IBC)
- Back to Iskul Bukol (1999–2000; IBC)
- Bahay-bahayan (1972; ABC)
- Bahay Mo Ba 'To? (2004–2007; GMA)
- Balitang Barbero (1965; ABC)
- BalitaOneNan (2022–2023; BuKo Channel, 2022; TV5, 2024; RPTV)
- Baltic & Co. (1974–1976; GMA)
- Banana Sundae (2008–2020; ABS-CBN)
- Bara Bara Anything Goes (2015–2016; CNN Philippines)
- Barangay U.S.: Unang Sigaw (1994–1995; New Vision 9/RPN)
- Barkada Trip (2004–2009; Studio 23)
- Basta Barkada (1978; RPN)
- Bawal Lumabas: The Series (2020–2021; iWantTFC, 2021; Kapamilya Channel/A2Z)
- Baywalk (2005; QTV)
- Beach Bros (2023; Kapamilya Channel/A2Z)
- Beh Bote Nga (1999–2003; GMA)
- Betty and the Beast (1994; GMA)
- Bhoy (1991–1992; PTV)
- Bida si Mister, Bida si Misis (2002–2005; ABS-CBN)
- Billy Bilyonaryo (1994–1995; GMA)
- Bisoy (BBC)
- Bistek (1991–1992; Islands TV 13)
- Bitoy's Adventures in Bilibkaba? (1997–2001; GMA)
- Bitoy's Funniest Videos (2004–2009; GMA)
  - a.k.a. Bitoy's Funniest Home Videos, Bitoy's Funniest Videos: Yari ka
- Bitoy's World (2001–2002; GMA)
- Boarding Haus (2026–present; D8TV)
- Boarding House (1969–1972; ABS-CBN)
- Bogart Case Files (2015–2016; CNN Philippines)
- Bola Bola (2022; iWantTFC/Kapamilya Channel/A2Z)
- Bora: Sons of the Beach (2005–2006; ABS-CBN)
- Bubble Gang (1995–present; GMA, 2023–2024; GTV/Pinoy Hits)
  - Bubble Gang Jr. (2005; GMA)
- Buddy en Sol (1990–1995; RPN/New Vision 9)
- Buhay Artista (1964–1972; ABS-CBN)
- Buhok-Pinoy (BBC)
- Cafeteria Aroma (1969–1972; ABS-CBN, 1979; RPN, 1983–1984; GMA)
- Call Me Tita (2019; iWant, 2023; Kapamilya Channel/A2Z)
- Caloy's Angels (1992; ABC)
- Camera Café (2007–2009; GMA/Q)
- Champoy (1980–1985; RPN)
- Chika Chika Chicks (1987–1991; ABS-CBN)
  - Chicks to Chicks (1979–1987; IBC)
- Clubhouse 9 (1977–1978; RPN)
- Co-Ed Blues (1987–1988; RPN)
- Comedy Bites (2005–2007; ABC)
- Confessions of a Torpe (2014; TV5)
- C.U.T.E. (Call Us Two for Entertainment) (1980; IBC)
- D' Lookalayks in Puno't Bunga (1994–1995; GMA)
- Da Young Once (1986–1987; PTV)
- Daboy en Da Girl (2002–2003; GMA)
- Daddy Di Do Du (2001–2007; GMA)
- Daddy's Gurl (2018–2023; GMA)
- Dalawang Tisoy (2007; RPN)
- Dear Uge (2016–2022; GMA)
- Dobol Trobol (1989; RPN)
- Dok Ricky, Pedia (2017–2020; ABS-CBN)
- Do'n Po Sa Amin (1994; New Vision 9)
- Dr. Potpot and the Satellite Kid (1985; RPN)
- Drag You & Me (2023; iWantTFC/Kapamilya Channel/A2Z)
- Duplex (1980–1984; RPN)
- Eh Kasi Babae (1987–1988; IBC)
- Estudyante Blues (1990–1992; PTV)
- Everybody Hapi (2008–2010; TV5)
- Exclusive Champoy (1992–1993; ABS-CBN)
- Family Zoo (2006; QTV)
- Four Da Boys (1991–1993; IBC)
- Ful Haus (2007–2009; GMA)
- Funny Ka, Pare Ko (2016–2018; Cine Mo!)
- Gabi ni Dolphy (1990; New Vision 9)
- Gag Ito (2006–2007; Studio 23)
- Gag U! (2012–2014; Studio 23)
- Ganda ng Lola Ko (2005–2006; QTV)
- Ganito Kami Ngayon, O Ano Ha (1994; New Vision 9)
- Gillage People (1997; GMA)
- Goin Bananas (1986–1987; IBC, 1987–1991; ABS-CBN)
- Goin' Bulilit (2005–2019; ABS-CBN, 2024; Kapamilya Channel/A2Z/All TV)
- GoodWill (2023–present; Net 25)
- Gorio And His Jeepney (1966–1968; ABC)
- Gudtaym (2006; ABS-CBN)
- H3O: Ha Ha Ha Over (2005–2007; QTV/Q)
- Ha Ha Hayop (2008–2009; TV5)
- Hapi ang Buhay (2016; Net 25)
- Hapi House! (1987–1990; IBC)
- Hapinas (2006–2008; QTV/Q)
- Hapi Together (2010–2011; TV5)
- Happy Naman D'yan! (2020–2022; TV5)
- Happy ToGetHer (2021–2023; GMA, 2023; Pinoy Hits)
- Hay, Bahay! (2016–2017; GMA)
- Haybol Rambol (1993–1995; GMA)
- Hokus Pokus (2005–2006; GMA)
  - HP: Ibang Level Na! (2006–2007; GMA)
- Home Along Da Riles (1992–2003; ABS-CBN)
  - Home Along Da Airport (2003–2005; ABS-CBN)
- Home Sweetie Home (2014–2020; ABS-CBN)
- Hoy! (1990–1991; New Vision 9)
- Hoy, Hindi (PTV)
- Hoy, Love You! (2021; Kapamilya Channel/A2Z)
  - Hoy Love You 3 (2022; Kapamilya Channel/A2Z)
  - Hoy Love You Two (2022; Kapamilya Channel/A2Z)
- I Laugh Sabado (2010–2011; Q)
- Ibang Klase (1997–1998; GMA)
- Idol Ko si Kap (2000–2005; GMA)
- Idol si Pidol (1992–1995; ABC)
- In DA Money (2005; RPN)
- Iskul Bukol (1978–1988; IBC, 2011; TV5)
- Ismol Family (2014–2016; GMA)
- Ispup (1999–2003; ABC)
  - Ispup Atbp. (2003–2004; ABC)
- It Bulingit (1990–1991; ABS-CBN)
- Iyan ang Misis Ko (1970–1972; RPN)
- Jack & Jill sa Diamond Hills (2023–2024; TV5/BuKo Channel)
- Joey and Son (1980–1983; RPN)
- John en Ellen (2021; TV5)
- John en Marsha (1973–1990; KBS/RPN/New Vision 9)
- John en Shirley (2006–2007; ABS-CBN)
- Jose & Maria's Bonggang Villa (2022–2024; GMA, 2024; Pinoy Hits)
- Juan Tamad (2015–2016; GMA)
- Just the 3 of Us (1992–1993; New Vision 9)
- Kaluskos-Musmos (1984–1989; RPN)
- Kalye Kweens (2022; TV5/Sari-Sari Channel)
- Kami Naman (1990; New Vision 9)
- Kapiterya Pinoy (2001–2002; RPN)
- Kate en Boogie (1993–1994; GMA)
- Kaya ni Mister, Kaya ni Misis (1997–2001; ABS-CBN)
- Kemis: Kay Misis Umaasa (2007; RPN)
- Kiss Muna (2000–2001; GMA)
- Kool Ka Lang (1999–2003; GMA)
- Lady Dada (2010; TV5)
- Lagot Ka... Isusumbong Kita! (2003–2007; GMA)
- Lakas Tawa (2017–2018; Cine Mo!)
- Last Two Minites (1990; PTV)
- Laugh to Laugh: Ang Kulit! (2005–2006; QTV)
- Let's Go! (2006–2007; ABS-CBN)
- Lokomoko (2008–2009, 2011–2013; TV5)
  - Lokomoko High (2009–2010; TV5)
  - Lokomoko U (2010–2011; TV5)
  - Lokomoko U: Ang Kulit! (2012–2013; TV5)
- Love Bosleng and Tali (2022–present; Net 25)
- Love Me Doods (1990–1991; PTV)
- Luv U (2012–2016; ABS-CBN)
- Lyric and Beat (2022; iWantTFC/Kapamilya Channel/A2Z)
- Mac and Chiz (2015; TV5)
- Mag-Asawa'y Di Biro (1990–1993; New Vision 9)
- Magic? Gimik! Revealed (2010–2011; TV5)
  - Magic? Bagsik! (2011–2012; TV5)
- Mah Tah Tu (BBC)
- Maid in Heaven (2004; ABS-CBN)
- May For Ever (2024–present; Net 25)
- Misterless Misis (2015; TV5)
- Mixed N.U.T.S. (Numero Unong Terrific Show!) (1994–1997; GMA)
- Mommy Elvie's Problematic Show (2007–2008; ABC)
- Mommy Ko si Tita (1993–1994; New Vision 9)
- Mongolian Barbecue (1990–1992; IBC, 1992–1994; New Vision 9)
- Mr. DJ (1992; ABC)
- My Darling Aswang (2010–2011; TV5)
- My Juan and Only (2005–2006; ABS-CBN)
- My Papa Pi (2022; Kapamilya Channel/A2Z)
- My Son, My Son (1977; RPN)
- Naks! (2004–2005; GMA)
- Naku, Ha (PTV)
- Nanette Por Kilo (ABS-CBN)
- No Harm, No Foul (2015; TV5)
- No Permanent Address (1986; RPN)
- Nuts Entertainment (2003–2008; GMA)
- O-Ha! (2006–2007; ABC)
- O, Mare Ko (2005–2006; QTV)
- Ober Da Bakod (1992–1997; GMA)
- Ogag (1996–1998; ABC)
  - Ogags (2008–2010; TV5)
- Oh My Korona (2022; TV5)
- Oh No! It's B.O. (Biro Only) (2022–present; Net 25)
- OK Fine, 'To ang Gusto Nyo! (2004–2006; ABS-CBN)
  - Ok Fine Whatever (2002–2004; ABS-CBN)
  - Ok Fine! Oh Yes (2006; ABS-CBN)
- OK ka'tol (1989–1991; IBC/Islands TV 13)
- OK Lang (1973–1975; IBC)
- Okay Ka, Fairy Ko! (1987–1989; IBC, 1989–1995; ABS-CBN, 1995–1997; GMA)
- Oki Doki Doc (1993–2000; ABS-CBN)
- Oks na Oks (1988; PTV)
- One of the Boys (2015; TV5)
- Open 24/7 (2023–2024; GMA, 2024; Pinoy Hits)
- Padyak Princess (2024; TV5)
- Palibhasa Lalake (1987–1998; ABS-CBN)
- Pepito Manaloto (2010–2012; GMA)
  - Pepito Manaloto: Ang Tunay na Kwento (2012–2021; GMA)
  - Pepito Manaloto: Ang Unang Kwento (2021–2022; GMA)
  - Pepito Manaloto: Tuloy ang Kwento (2022–present; GMA, 2023–2024; Pinoy Hits)
- Pinky and Boyet (RPN)
- Plaza 1899 (1986–1988; RPN)
- Prinsipe Abante (1977–1982; GMA)
- Project 11 (2006; QTV)
- Prrrt... Foul! (1980–1981; BBC)
- Purungtong (1991–1993; New Vision 9)
- Que Horror (1996–1998; ABC)
- Quizon Avenue (2005–2006; ABS-CBN)
- Quizon CT (2020–2022; Net 25)
- Rakista (2008; TV5)
- Rated PangBayan: Pugad Baboy sa TV (1993–1994; GMA)
- Ready na Direk! (1991–1993; New Vision 9)
- Roomies (2026–present; D8TV)
- Rock and Roll 2000 (1993–1994; ABC)
- Run to Me (2022; iWantTFC/Kapamilya Channel/A2Z)
- Sa Kabukiran (1986; RPN)
- Sabado Badoo (2015; GMA)
- Sabi ni Nanay (2007; RPN)
- Shock Attack (2008–2009; TV5)
- Show Me Da Manny (2009–2011; GMA)
- Si Manoy at si Mokong (1997–1998; GMA)
- Si Tsong, Si Tsang (1997–1998; GMA)
- Sic O'Clock News (1987–1990; IBC)
- Sitak ni Jack (1986–1989; IBC)
- Spooky Nights (2011–2012; GMA)
  - Spooky Valentine (2012; GMA)
- Starzan (1990–1991; New Vision 9, 1992; ABC)
- Stay Awake (1992; ABC)
- Stir (1988; RPN)
- Strangebrew (2001–2004; UNTV/NBN/Studio 23)
- Sugo Mga Kapatid (2011; TV5)
- Sunday 'Kada (2020–2021; TV5)
- Super Klenk (1999–2000; GMA)
- Super Laff-In (1969–1972, 1996–1999; ABS-CBN)
- Swerte-Swerte Lang! (2011; TV5)
- Tambakan Alley (1981–1983; RPN)
- Tanods (2015; TV5)
- Tara, G! (2022; iWantTFC, 2023; Kapamilya Channel/A2Z)
- Tarajing Potpot (1999–2000; ABS-CBN)
- Team A (2023; TV5/Sari-Sari Channel)
- Teen Clash (2023; iWantTFC/Kapamilya Channel/A2Z)
- Teka Mona! (2006–2007; ABC)
- Tepok Bunot (1981–1982; BBC)
- That's My Doc (2007–2008; ABS-CBN)
- The Goodbye Girl (2022; iWantTFC, 2023; Kapamilya Channel/A2Z)
- The Jose and Wally Show Starring Vic Sotto (2011–2012; TV5)
- The Weakend News With Ramon Bautista (2008–2009; TV5)
- Tipitipitim Tipitom (2005; RPN)
- Toda Max (2011–2013; ABS-CBN)
- T.O.D.A.S.: Television's Outrageously Delightful All-Star Show (1980–1989; IBC)
  - T.O.D.A.S. Again (1993; IBC)
- Tokshow With Mr. Shooli (1999–2000; RPN)
- Tols (2022; GTV)
- Tondominium (1993–1994; ABC)
- Trio Los Bobos (1970; ABC)
- Tropang Trumpo (1994–1999; ABC)
  - Tropa Mo Ko Unli (2013–2014; TV5)
  - Tropang Kulit (2013; TV5)
  - Tropa Mo Ko: Nice, ‘Di Ba? (2014–2015; TV5)
  - Tropa Mo Ko Unli Spoof (2015; TV5)
- T.S.U.P (1990; New Vision 9)
- Tsuperhero (2016–2017; GMA)
- TVJ on 5 (1992; ABC)
- TVJ: Television's Jesters (1989–1992; IBC/Islands TV 13)
- Unloving U (2021; Kapamilya Channel/A2Z)
- Urban Tales: Tawatakutan (2010; TV5)
- Vampire Ang Daddy Ko (2013–2016; GMA)
- Wala Yan Sa Lolo Ko! (2005–2006; ABC)
- Walang Matigas na Pulis sa Matinik na Misis (2023–2025; GMA, 2024; Pinoy Hits)
- Wazzup Wazzup (2004–2007; Studio 23)
- Whattamen (2001–2004; ABS-CBN)
- Wide, Wonderful World (1977–1979; GTV)
- Wow! (1998–2000; IBC)
- Wow Mali! (1996–2008; ABC, 2009–2024; TV5)
  - Wow Maling Mali! (2005–2006; ABC)
  - Wow Mali Bytes (2007; ABC)
  - Wow Mali Express (2007–2008; ABC)
  - Wow Meganon (2010–2011; TV5)
  - Wow Mali Pa Rin! (2013–2014; TV5)
  - Wow Mali Lakas ng Tama! (2014–2015; TV5)
  - Wow Mali: Doble Tama (2023–2024; TV5/BuKo Channel)
- Wow Mani (2025; VMX)
- Yes, Yes Show! (2004–2006; ABS-CBN)

== Cooking ==
- A Taste of Life with Heny Sison (2000–2007; IBC)
- At Home with Nora (1966–1972; ABS-CBN)
- Chasing Flavors with Claude Tayag (2018–present; ANC)
- Chef Boy Logro: Kusina Master (2012–2014; GMA)
- Chef to Go (2007–2009; Q)
- Cocktales (2011–2013; AksyonTV)
- Cooking.Com (2001–2003; RPN)
- Cooking It Up with Nora (1977–1978; IBC)
- Cooking with the Stars (1995; RPN, 2012; GMA)
- Del Monte Kitchenomics (1989–1995, 2000–2004; ABS-CBN, 1995–2000, 2012–2015; GMA, 2011; GMA News TV)
- Discover Eats (2022–present; One PH)
- Eateria (2009–2010; GMA)
- Farm to Table (2021–present; GMA News TV/GTV)
- From Helen's Kitchen (2017–2021: Colours, 2020–2023, 2026; TV5, 2022–present; One PH, 2026; RPTV)
- Gellicious (2011–2012; TV5)
- Gourmet Everyday (2003–2007; ABC)
- Hello Pagkain! (2024–present; One PH)
- Home Foodie (2015–2019; GMA)
- Idol sa Kusina (2011–2020; GMA News TV)
- Island Flavors (2004–2008; ABC)
- Ka-Toque: Lutong Barkada (2005–2009; QTV/Q)
- Kiddie Cuisine (2018; Colours)
- Kusina Atbp. (1989–2002; PTV/NBN, 1995–1999; RPN)
- Kusina sa Kanayunan (2018; PTV)
- Kusina ni Mamang (2022–2023; TV5)
- Kwentong Kusina, Kwentong Buhay (2013; ABS-CBN)
- Kwentong Kutsara (2019–2020; One PH)
- Lutong Bahay (1985–1989; RPN, 1998–2002; PTV/NBN, 2024–2025; GTV)
- Lutong Daza (2022–present; Net 25)
- Lutong-Luto with CJ Hirro (2019–2020; PTV)
- Lutong Pinasarap (2025–present; GMA)
- Mobile Kusina (2005–2006; GMA)
- My Favorite Recipes (2009–2010; Q)
- Nancy Lumen: The Pinoy Foodie (2011–2012; GMA News TV)
- Pinas Sarap (2017–2020; GMA News TV, 2020–2021; GMA, 2021–2025; GTV)
- Pinoy Flavors (2025–present; DWAN TV)
- Quickfire (2008–2012; Q/GMA News TV)
- ReFOODlika Na Sa Pilipinas (2024–2025; DWAN TV)
- Saka-Inan (2023; PTV)
- Sarap at Home (2009–2012; Q/GMA News TV)
- Sarap Pinoy (2011–2017; Light TV/Light Network)
- Sarap to Heart (2012; GMA News TV)
- Sarap TV (1998–2002; ABS-CBN)
- Sarap with Family (2013–2017; GMA News TV)
- Tele-Kusina (2002–2003; NBN)
- Tara, Food Trip (2026–present; D8TV)
- Tiny Kitchen (2014–2016; Light Network, 2015–2016; GMA News TV)
- Ya Chang's Pagkain Atbp. (2010–2011; IBC)

== Current affairs ==
- @ Ur Serbis (2008–2012; NBN/PTV)
- #ipaBITAGmo (2023–present; IBC/CLTV)
- #KOOL 2 (2024–2025; Abante TeleTabloid)
- #NoFilter (2019–2020; ABS-CBN/DZMM TeleRadyo/Jeepney TV)
- #PBBMWeek (2025–present; GMA)
- 100% Pinoy! (2006–2008; GMA)
- 25 Tanong ng Bayan (2025; Net 25)
- 3-in-1 (2015; ABS-CBN)
- 45 Minutos (2004–2005; NBN)
- 911-UNTV (2015–2019; UNTV)
- A Dialogue with Pres. C. Aquino (1986–1987; PTV)
- Aba Trending! (2024–2025; Abante TeleTabloid)
- Abante Pilipinas (2008–2010; NBN, 2024–2025; Abante TeleTabloid, 2025–present; Abante TV)
- Abante Pilipinas Weekend (2025; Abante TV)
- Abogado (2025–present; Bilyonaryo News Channel)
- Abogado ng Bayan (2023–2024; PTV)
- Action 9 (1993–1998; RPN)
- Adyenda (2005, 2008–2011; ZOE TV, 2005–2017; GMA, 2005–2011; QTV/Q, 2011–2014; Light TV, 2011–2018; GMA News TV, 2014–2017; Light Network)
- Adbokasiya (2013–2016, 2021–present; DZRH News Television/DZRH TV)
- After the Fact (2021–2022; ANC)
- Agapay: Tatak Rosa Rosal (2026–present; D8TV)
- Agenda (2015–2016; CNN Philippines)
- Agenda ng Bayan (2023–2024; Radyo Pilipinas 1 Television)
- Agenda with Cito Beltran (2018–2023; One News)
- Agri Asenso (2021–present; DZRH News Television/DZRH TV)
- Ako Ang Simula (2010–2013; ABS-CBN/ANC, 2011–2012; DZMM TeleRadyo)
- Ako Bicol Tabang Oro Mismo (2024–present; Congress TV)
- Ako Bicol sa Abante Radyo (2025; Abante TV)
- Ako Mismo (2010–2011; TV5)
- Aksyon Abante (2024–2025; Abante TeleTabloid)
- Aksyon Agad! (2026–present; Aliw 23/DWIZ News TV)
- Aksyon Bantay OFW (2018–2019; DZRH News Television)
- Aksyon DOLE sa DZMM (2025; DZMM TeleRadyo/PRTV Prime Media)
- Aksyon Kababaihan (2016–present; DZRH News Television/DZRH TV)
- Aksyon Ngayon (2007–2016, 2025–present; DZMM TeleRadyo, 2025–present; PRTV Prime Media)
- Aksyon Solusyon (2011–2019; AksyonTV, 2019–2020; One PH)
- Aksyon, Tulong, Solusyon (2023; DZRH TV)
- Alagang AMOSUP (2025–present; Radyo Pilipinas 1 Television)
- Alagang Kapatid (2015–2019; AksyonTV, 2019–2020; One PH, 2024–present; True FM TV/True TV)
- Alerto Siete-Tres-Otso (2026–present; Radyo Pilipinas 1 Television)
- Ali (2005–2007; ABC)
- Alisto (2013–2020, 2021; GMA, 2020–2021; GMA News TV)
- All Politics is Local (2021–2022; One News/One PH)
- Amerika Atbp. (2000–2007; IBC, 2006–2008; ABC, 2008–2012; NBN/PTV)
- Ang Batasan (1982–1985; MBS)
- Ang Inyong Kawal (2021–present; UNTV)
- Ang Paghahanda para sa Hatol ng Bayan (2013; PTV)
- Ang Pandayan ni Mang Pandoy (1993–1997; PTV)
- Ang Senado ng Pilipinas (2024–present; IBC)
- Ang Tao't Kalikasan (2011; NBN)
- Anggulo (2011–2012; TV5/AksyonTV)
- Ano Ngani? (ABS-CBN Tacloban)
- Ano sa Palagay N'yo? (2021–present; Net 25)
- Anything Goes (2024–2025; Abante TeleTabloid)
- Aplikante (2025; TV5/One News/One PH/RPTV)
- Aprub (2011–2019; Net 25)
- Arangkada (ABS-CBN Cagayan de Oro)
- Armas Batas (2024–2025; Abante TeleTabloid)
- Arnelli in da Haus (2019–2020; IBC)
- Asenso Pinoy (2005–2008; ABC, 2006–2011; IBC, 2008–2014, 2023–2024; NBN/PTV, 2013–2014; Studio 23, 2014–2020; S+A, 2020–2023; A2Z)
- Asintado... Ciento Por Ciento (2026–present; Aliw 23/DWIZ News TV)
- A.S.K. All Should Know (2026; DWAN TV)
- At the Forefront (2024–present; Bilyonaryo News Channel)
- At the Moment with Imee (2024–2025; One PH/All TV)
- At Your Service-Star Power (2005–2007; QTV/Q)
  - At Your Service (2004–2005; GMA)
- Back to Back (1996; RPN)
- Bagong Barangay ng Mamamayan in Action (2023; IBC, 2023–2026; Aliw 23, 2024–2026; DWIZ News TV)
- Bagong Maunlad na Agrikultura (2009–2011; IBC)
- Bagong Pilipinas (2023–present; PTV/IBC)
- Bagong Pilipinas: PBBM Lingkod ng Bayan (2023–present; IBC)
- Bagong Pilipinas Ngayon (2023–present; PTV, 2023–2024; IBC, 2025–present; Radyo Pilipinas 1 Television)
- Bagong Umaga, Bagong Pag-asa (2023–present; Radyo Pilipinas 1 Television)
- Bahala si Tulfo (2004–2005; UNTV)
- Bahala sina Ben at Erwin Tulfo (2005–2006; UNTV)
- Bahala si Bitag (2006–2008; UNTV)
- Bahay at Bahay (1991–1998; IBC)
- Bahay Pinoy, Buhay Pinoy (2016–2020; Inquirer 990 Television, 2023–2024; Aliw 23)
- Balansyado (2022–present; DZRH TV)
- Balen (2017–present; CLTV)
- Balikatan (RPN)
- Balikatan: Sa Bahay at Buhay (1999–2011; PTV/NBN)
- Balitaktakan: Tinig ng Kinabukasan (2025–present; Congress TV/IBC)
- Balitalakay (2008–2010; NBN)
- Balitang K (1996–2001; ABS-CBN)
- Balitapatan (2024–2025; TeleRadyo Serbisyo, 2024–present; Prime TV/PRTV Prime Media, 2025–present; DZMM TeleRadyo)
- Balwarte (2025; TV5/One News/One PH/RPTV)
- Bangon, Bagong Pilipinas (2024–2026; DWAN TV, 2026; IBC)
- Bangon, Bayang Mahal! (2023–present; Radyo Pilipinas 1 Television)
- Bantay Kongreso (1988; PTV)
- Bantay OCW with Susan K.: Ang Boses ng OFW (2005–2013; NBN/PTV)
- Banyuhay (1988–1989; RPN)
- Barangay 13 (2025–present; DWAN TV)
- Barangay Dos (2000–2001; ABS-CBN)
- Bardagulan sa Radyo (2024–2025; Abante TeleTabloid)
- Basta Batas (2025–present; One PH/True TV)
- Basta Enerhiya, Sagot Kita! (2024–2025; All TV)
- Batas Barangay (2005; NBN)
- Batas et Al (2023–2024; CNN Philippines, 2024–2025; Aliw 23/RPTV)
- Bawal ang Pasaway kay Mareng Winnie (2011–2020; GMA News TV)
- Bawat Pinoy Kapamilya (ABS-CBN)
- Bayan Ko, Sagot Ko (1994–1996; ABS-CBN)
- Bayanihan (2012–2015; UNTV)
- Ben Tulfo Unfiltered (2018; PTV)
- Bet to Serve (2022; IBC)
- Beyond Politics with Lynda Jumilla (2013–2019; ANC)
- Beyond the Exchange (2024–present; ANC)
- Biblia at Balita (2001; SBN)
- Bida Konsyumer (2020–2023; TeleRadyo)
- Bigtime (2014–2015; TV5/AksyonTV)
- Bistado (2012–2015; ABS-CBN)
- Bitag (2002–2003, 2011–2012; ABC/TV5, 2003–2011, 2019; IBC, 2012–2019; PTV)
- Bitag Live (2008–2013; UNTV, 2013–2017; AksyonTV, 2017–2023; PTV, 2023–2024; IBC)
- Biyaheng IZ (2025–2026; DWIZ News TV)
- Biyaheng Totoo (2010–2013; GMA)
- BizNews (2009–2011, 2011–2015, 2017–2019; NBN/PTV)
- Blotter (1989–1990; RPN/New Vision 9)
- BolJak (2018–2019; AksyonTV, 2019–2020; One PH)
- Boses (2007–2008; NBN, 2025–present; Radyo Pilipinas 1 Television)
- Breaktime (2015–present; DZRH News Television/DZRH TV)
- Brgy. 882 (2022–2023; IZTV, 2023–2026; Aliw 23, 2024–2026; DWIZ News TV)
- Bridging Borders (2015–2017; PTV)
- Budol Alert (2024–2025; TV5)
- Buhay Metro (2022–2023; IZTV)
- Buhay OFW (2011–2019; AksyonTV/5 Plus)
- Business & Leisure (1991–1998; ABS-CBN, 1998–2007; PTV/NBN, 2007–2019; Solar Sports)
- Business Above Usual (2020–2021; TeleRadyo)
- Business and Beyond (2016–2017; PTV/GMA News TV/IBC)
- Business Brief (2025–2026; Bilyonaryo News Channel)
- Business Class (1991–2001; New Vision 9/RPN)
- Business Insights (1987; PTV)
- Business Nightly (2000–2020; ANC)
- Business Outlook (2023–present; ANC)
- Business Talks (1984–1986: PTV)
- Business Today (1990–1996; GMA)
- Cabinet @ Work (2023–present; IBC)
  - Cabinet Report sa Teleradyo (2018, 2019–2022; PTV, 2020; IBC)
- Cayetano in Action with Boy Abunda (2023–2026; GMA, 2023–2025; GTV, 2024–2025; CLTV)
- Cerge for Truth (2003–2007; RPN)
- Certified Kasangbahay (2008–2016; UNTV)
- Chairman's Report with Dr. Dante "Klink" Ang II (2024–present; IBC)
- Check Up Podcast (2026–present; UNTV)
- Chicken, Pork, Atbp. (2002–2003; ABS-CBN)
- Citiline (1994–1999; ABS-CBN, 1999–2003; Studio 23)
- Citizen Patrol (2000–2001; IBC)
- Cocktales (2011–2014; AksyonTV)
- Code Red (2025–present; PTV)
- COMELEC Hour (2013; PTV)
- COMELEC Usapang Halalan (2025; PTV)
- Compañero y Compañera (1997–1998; ABS-CBN, 1998–2000; GMA, 2000–2001; RPN)
- Con Todos Recados (2001–2005; Net 25)
- Cong Radyo (2025–present; Abante TV)
- Congress in Action with Freddie Abando (2009–2012; NBN/PTV)
- Consumer's Desk (2019–2020; IBC)
- Convergence (2008–2011; NBN)
- Counterpoint with Secretary Salvador Panelo (2008–2011; IBC, 2020–2021; PTV, 2022–present; Net 25)
- Crime Klasik (2013; TV5)
- Dagundong (2005–2008; NBN)
- Dakila Ka Pinoy! (1993–1997; PTV)
- Damayan (1969–1972; ABS-CBN, 1975–1980; GTV, 1980–1986; MBS, 1986–2001, 2017–2020; PTV, 2001–2010; NBN)
- Damdaming Bayan (2007–present; TV Natin/RHTV/DZRH News Television/DZRH TV)
- Dapat Alam Mo! (2021–2024; GTV, 2022, 2023; GMA, 2023–2024; Pinoy Hits)
- Dapat Legal (2026–present; AllRadio TV/All TV)
- Dayo (2013–2014; TV5/AksyonTV)
- Dear SV (2023; CNN Philippines, 2023–2025; GMA)
- Debate with Mare at Pare (1998–2006; GMA)
- Dee's Day (2003–2007; RPN)
- Demandahan (2012–2013; ABS-CBN)
- Demolition Job (2013–2015; TV5/AksyonTV)
- DHSUD’s Kapihan sa Radyo (2025–present; Radyo Pilipinas 1 Television)
- Dial M (1995–1998; PTV, 2003–2010; NBN, 2010; IBC)
- Dial OCR (1973–1980; KBS/RPN)
- Dighay Bayan (1996–2005; PTV/NBN)
- Digong 8888 Hotline (2019–2022; PTV, 2020; IBC)
- DILG: Tayo Na! (2019; PTV)
- Direct Line (2003–2006; RPN)
- Direksyon (2026–present; DWAN TV)
- Diretsahan with Cheryl Cosim (2010–2012; AksyonTV)
- Diskarte (2015–present; DZRH News Television/DZRH TV)
- Diskurso (2016–2017; CLTV)
- Diskusyon (2014–2019; Net 25)
- Divina Law (2025–2026; Bilyonaryo News Channel)
- Diyos at Bayan (1998–2005, 2008–2011; ZOE TV, 1998–2001, 2003–2005; RPN, 2001–2002; NBN, 2005–2011; QTV/Q, 2006–2019; GMA, 2011–2019; GMA News TV, 2011–2014, 2018–present; Light TV, 2014–2018; Light Network, 2021–present; A2Z)
- Doc Willie and Liza (RJTV)
- Doctor On Board (2023–present; Radyo Pilipinas 1 Television)
- Doctors on TV (2011–2026; UNTV)
- DocuCentral Presents (2019; ABS-CBN/DZMM TeleRadyo/Jeepney TV/ANC)
- Dok True Ba? (2024–present; IBC)
- Doktor is in(2024; Abante TeleTabloid)
- DOLE At Your Service sa Bagong Pilipinas (2025–present; Radyo Pilipinas 1 Television)
- Dong Puno De Kalibre (2011–2013; AksyonTV)
- Dos Kumpanyeras (2021–present; DZRH News Television/DZRH TV)
- Dos por Dos (2007–2020; DZMM TeleRadyo, 2010–2012; Studio 23, 2020; TeleRadyo, 2020–present; DZRH News Television/DZRH TV)
- DOTR Sakay NA (2025–present; Radyo Pilipinas 1 Television)
- Dra. Bles @ Ur Serbis (2007–2020; DZMM TeleRadyo/TeleRadyo)
- Draw the Line (2008–2009; Q)
- Du30 on Duty (2019–2022; IBC)
- Duelo kasama si Dick Gordon (2011–2013; AksyonTV)
- Easy Lang (2024–2025; Abante TeleTabloid, 2025; Abante TV)
- El Pueblo Publico (2022–2023; IZTV, 2023–present; Aliw 23, 2024–present; DWIZ News TV)
- Engkwentro (2012–2013; ABS-CBN)
- Entrepinoy Start-Up (2002–2005; IBC)
- Equilibrium: Sukatan ng Katwiran (2008–2012; NBN/PTV)
- Executive Session (2014–present; DZRH News Television/DZRH TV)
- Explore with Mike (2001–2003; NBN)
- Export... Made in the Philippines (1986–1993; IBC)
- Extra Express (2010–2011; IBC)
- Extra! Extra! (1999–2003; GMA)
- Face the Nation (1977–1986; GTV/MBS/PTV)
- Failon Ngayon (2009–2020; ABS-CBN/ANC, 2018–2020; Jeepney TV)
- Failon Ngayon sa DZMM (2011–2020; DZMM TeleRadyo, 2020; ANC)
- Failon Ngayon sa TeleRadyo (2011–2020; TeleRadyo)
- Focus (2010–2012, 2016–2017; CLTV)
- Follow the Money (2024–present; Bilyonaryo News Channel)
- For M (2006–2007; RPN)
- For the Record (2025–present; Abante TV)
- Frontlines (2006–2007; ABC)
- FVR Up Close (1992–1998; New Vision 9/RPN/PTV/IBC)
- FYI (2020–2022; IBC, 2025–present; Abante TV)
- Gabay at Aksyon (2008–2011, 2017–present; IBC, 2013–2016; PTV, 2017–2018; Net 25)
- Get It Straight with Daniel Razon (2010–2023; UNTV)
- Gintong Uhay (2011; IBC)
- Global Conversations (2015–2016; CNN Philippines)
- GNN Forum (GNN)
- Good Stories (2026–present; IBC)
- Good Take (2000–2005, 2009; IBC)
- Gov @ Work (2013–2014; PTV/IBC)
- Gov on the Move (2026–present; IBC)
- GSIS Members' Hour (2005–2007, 2010–2020; NBN/PTV)
- Gus Abelgas Forensics (2023–present; One PH, 2023–2024; TV5, 2024; RPTV)
- Hamon: Central Luzon (CLTV)
- Hamon ng Kalikasan (2012; GMA News TV)
- Handa Sakuna (2024; IBC)
- Hanep Buhay (1992–1995; IBC)
- Hapi Kung Healthy (1999–2002; IBC)
- Harapan (2008; ABS-CBN)
- HB (Hamon ng Bayan) (CLTV)
- Headline (1986–1995; PTV)
- Headlines Expose (2004–2005; NBN)
- Headlines Exposed (2004–2005; RPN)
- Healthline (2006–2008; ABC, 2009–2013; IBC, 2017; PTV)
- HealthLine with Makati Med (2018–2019; RJ DigiTV)
- Health Med (2011; IBC)
- Heartbeat Philippines (RJTV)
- Heartwatch (1992–1994; Islands TV 13/IBC)
- Hello Attorney (2023–2025; TeleRadyo Serbisyo, 2024–present; Prime TV/PRTV Prime Media, 2025–present; DZMM TeleRadyo)
- Helpline sa 9 (1981–1983; RPN)
- Hired! (2008–2009; Q)
- Hirit Kabayan (RPN)
- Hiwaga (2012–2014; ABS-CBN)
- Home Page (2008–2013; Net 25)
- Hotline sa Trese (1990–1992; IBC/Islands TV 13)
- House At Your Service (2025–present; Congress TV/IBC)
- Hoy Gising! (1992–2001; ABS-CBN)
- Hoy Listen! (2026–present; Abante TV)
- Hukbong Dagat ng Pilipinas (2026–present; Radyo Pilipinas 1 Television)
- Huntahan (2012–2014; UNTV)
  - Huntahang Ligal (2018–present; UNTV)
- Huntahan (2019–present; DZRH News Television/DZRH TV)
- I-ARTA Na 'Yan! (2022; PTV)
- I-Connect: Balitang Social Media (2012–2013; PTV)
- I Am Ninoy (2008–2009; TV5)
- Iba 'Yan! (2020–2021; Kapamilya Channel/A2Z)
- Iba 'Yung Pinoy (2011–2019; AksyonTV, 2019–2020; One PH)
- Ibang Level 'To! (2026–present; Kapamilya Channel/A2Z/All TV)
- ICAD Advocacy TV (2021; PTV)
- Idol in Action (2020–2021; TV5/One PH)
- Ikaw ang Humatol (1991–1997; IBC)
- Ikaw at ang Batas (2000–2007; RPN/PTV/NBN/IBC)
- IM Ready sa Dobol B (2019–2021; GMA News TV)
- Impact with Max Soliven (1971–1972, 2004; ABS-CBN)
- Impormasyon at Aksyon sa Bagong Pilipinas (2024–present; Radyo Pilipinas 1 Television)
- Inbox (2025–2026; Abante TV)
- INCTV Public Service (2013–present; INC TV)
- Industry Beacon (2024–2025; Bilyonaryo News Channel)
- In Converzation (2026–present; IBC/Congress TV)
- In Person (2024–present; PTV)
- INQ&A (Inquirer 990 Television)
- INQ TV (2004–2005; ABC)
- Inquirer Nation (Inquirer 990 Television)
- Inquiry (1984–1986; MBS/PTV)
- Inside Business with Coco Alcuaz (2012–2016; ANC)
- Insider (2012; TV5/AksyonTV)
- Insider Exclusive Kapihan (2017–2019; PTV)
- Insight (RJTV)
- Insight Inside (2004–2007; RPN)
- Insights with April Lee Tan (2020–2024; ANC)
- Interaction (1976–1987; GMA)
- Interactive Health (RJTV)
- IRL (2020–2021; GMA News TV)
- Isang Tawag Ka Lang! (2025–present; DWAN TV)
- Isip Pinoy (1987–1989; PTV)
- Iskoolmates (2015–present; PTV, 2019; IBC)
- Iskovery Night (2025; D8TV)
- Istorya (2008–2016, 2017–2022; UNTV)
- Isumbong Mo Kay Tulfo (1996–2006; RPN, 2021; PTV)
  - Isumbong Mo (Tulfo Brothers) (2006; RPN)
- Isyu (1981–1985; RPN, 2002–2003; ABS-CBN, 2011–2019; RHTV/DZRH News Television)
  - Isyu 101 (2000–2002; ABS-CBN)
- Isyu @ Serbisyo with Eddie Carta (2018–present; PTV Cordillera)
- Isyu Ngayon (2008–2010; NBN)
- Isyu Ngayon (2010–2015; GMA Regional TV)
  - Isyu Karon Central Visayas
  - Isyu Karon Northern Mindanao
  - Isyu Karon Southern Mindanao
  - Isyu Karon Socsksargen
  - Isyu Ngayon North Central Luzon
  - Isyu Ngonian Bicolandia
  - Isyu Subong Ilonggo
  - Isyu Subong Negrense
- Isyu ng Bayan (2016–2020; Inquirer 990 Television, 2022–2023; IZTV, 2023–2026; Aliw 23, 2024–2026; DWIZ News TV)
- Isyu One-on-One with Ceasar Soriano (2017–2019; Inquirer 990 Television, 2019–2022; PTV)
- Isyung Pambayan (2019–present; DZRH News Television/DZRH TV)
- Isyung Pinoy (1989–1991; New Vision 9)
- Ito Ang Kongreso (2023–2024; IBC)
- Iyo Ang Katarungan (2003–2010; IBC)
- Jeep ni Erap (1999–2000; PTV/IBC/ANC)
- Jess Asking (2026–present; PRTV Prime Media)
- Job Network (1992–1999; PTV)
- Journo (2010–2012; TV5, 2011–2012; AksyonTV)
- Juan Trabaho (2025–present; Radyo Pilipinas 1 Television)
- Juander Titser (2020–2021; TeleRadyo)
- Justice on Air (2013–2016; UNTV)
- Kakampi (2000–2001; RPN)
- Kalikasan, Kalusugan, Kabuhayan (2013; TV5)
- Kalikasan, Kaunlaran by Earth Institute Asia (1992–1999; PTV)
- Kalusugan Mo, Sagot Ko (Philhealth) (2017–2018; PTV)
- Kamao Reloaded (2005–2006; NBN)
- Kandidato (2010–2013; GMA)
- Kandidato (2025; IBC/Congress TV)
- Kapamilya Konek (2013–2020; DZMM TeleRadyo, 2020–2023; TeleRadyo)
- Kapatid (2005–2006; RPN)
- Kapatid Mo, Idol Raffy Tulfo (2024–present; TV5/One PH, 2025–present; RPTV)
- Kapatiran Para sa Bayan (2022−2023; IZTV, 2023–2026; Aliw 23, 2024–2026; DWIZ News TV)
- Kapayapaan Atin Ito (2001–2009; NBN)
- Kapihan ng Bayan (2005–2007; RPN, 2006–2010, NBN)
- Kapihan sa Maynila (1987; PTV)
- Kapuso Mo, Jessica Soho (2004–present; GMA, 2023–present; GTV, 2023–2024; Pinoy Hits)
- Kapwa Ko Mahal Ko (1975–present; GMA)
- Kapwa Ko, Sagot Ko (2024–present; DWAN TV)
- Karambola (2022–2023; IZTV, 2023–present; Aliw 23, 2024–present; DWIZ News TV)
- Kasalo (2023–2024; TeleRadyo Serbisyo, 2024; Prime TV)
- Kasangga Mo ang Langit (1998–2007; RPN, 2007–2013; IBC, 2013–2019; PTV, 2019–2022; RJ DigiTV, 2024–2025; Abante TeleTabloid, 2025–present; Bilyonaryo News Channel/Abante TV)
- Katapatan sa Watawat at Lipunan (K.A.W.A.L.) (2007–2008; NBN)
- Kay Susan Tayo! (2003–2009; GMA)
- Kay Susan Tayo sa Super Radyo DZBB (2019–2020; GMA News TV)
- Kay Susan Tayo! Vlogs (2026–present; GMA Public Affairs)
- Kaya (2014–2016; TV5)
- Kaya Natin 'To! (RPN)
- KB Kaibigan (1986; PTV)
- KBYN: Kaagapay ng Bayan (2022–2023; Kapamilya Channel/A2Z/TeleRadyo)
- Kilos Pronto (2016–2017; UNTV, 2017–2018; PTV)
- Kita Mo Na, Galing ng Pinoy (2011–2012; PTV)
- Klima ng Pagbabago (2014–2019; Net 25)
- Know Your Candidates (2022, 2025; PTV)
- Knowledge Power (1998–2004; ABS-CBN)
- Konsyumer Atbp. (2007–2020; DZMM TeleRadyo, 2020; TeleRadyo, 2020–2021; GMA News TV, 2021–2024; GTV)
- Kontak 5 (1992–2000; ABC)
- Kontrobersyal (2003–2006; ABS-CBN)
- Korina Today (2006–2009; ANC)
- Kumare Klub (2011–2012; TV5)
- Kumpletos Rekados: Usapang Batas (2008–2015; RHTV/DZRH News Television)
- Kuwentuhang Lokal (2020; DZMM TeleRadyo/ANC, 2020–2021; TeleRadyo)
- KWATRObersyal (2015–2017; PTV)
- Kwatro Alas (2025; TeleRadyo Serbisyo, 2025–present; PRTV Prime Media, 2025–2026; DZMM TeleRadyo)
- Kwatro Kantos (2024–2025; Bilyonaryo News Channel, 2025; TeleRadyo Serbisyo/PRTV Prime Media)
- Kwentong Politiko (2024–2025; Abante TeleTabloid, 2025–present; Abante TV)
- Laban Para sa Karapatan (2022−2023; IZTV, 2023–2026; Aliw 23, 2024–2026; DWIZ News TV)
- Laging Handa Dokyu (2020–2022; PTV/IBC)
- Lakbay Tugon: Presidential Help Desk (2024; PTV)
- Larry Gadon Live (2024–present; PTV)
- Law Profile (2010–2016; UNTV)
- Legal at Espiritual (2001; SBN)
- Legal Forum (1992–2006; New Vision 9/RPN, 2004–2005, 2008–2011; ZOE TV, 2011–2014, 2018; Light TV, 2014–2018; Light Network)
- Legal Help Desk (2012–2016; Solar News Channel/9TV/CNN Philippines)
- Legal Matters (2017–present; CLTV)
- Legally Speaking (2025–present; IBC)
- Legally Yours (2008–2015; RHTV/DZRH News Television)
- Lente (1993–1996; ABC)
- Leslie Bocobo Live (2024–present; Radyo Pilipinas 1 Television)
- Lifesaver (2019–present; UNTV)
- Ligtas Dapat (2023–2025; TeleRadyo Serbisyo, 2024–present; Prime TV/PRTV Prime Media, 2025–present; DZMM TeleRadyo)
- Linawin Natin (2001–2007; IBC)
- Lingkod Bayan ni Tony Falcon (2011–2014; Light TV/Light Network/PTV)
- Lingkod Bayanihan (2021; PTV)
- Lingkod Kapamilya sa DZMM (2017–2020; DZMM TeleRadyo, 2020; ANC)
- Lingkod Kapamilya sa TeleRadyo (2020–2023; TeleRadyo)
- Linya ng Pagbabago (2017–2019; PTV)
- Liwanagin Natin (2001–2007; Net 25)
- LM: Legal Minds (2016–2018, 2019–2021; DZRH News Television)
- Local Legends (2019–2020; ABS-CBN/DZMM TeleRadyo/Jeepney TV)
- Long Table (2025–present; Abante TV)
- Lukso ng Dugo (2004; ABS-CBN)
- Lupet (2010–2011; TV5)
- Lusob Probinsya (2024–2025; Abante TeleTabloid)
- Lusob Probinsya Weekend (2025; Abante TV)
- Mabuhay Pilipinas (2023–present; Radyo Pilipinas 1 Television)
- Madam Ratsa Live! (2003–2004; RPN)
- Magandang Gabi... Bayan (1988–2005; ABS-CBN)
- Magandang Gabi Pilipinas with Ceasar Soriano (2019–2022; PTV)
- Magbago Tayo (2011–2017; AksyonTV)
- Magbuhay Professional (2003–2004; NBN)
- Magpayo Nga Kayo (2007–2020; DZMM TeleRadyo)
- Mahiwagang Mundo ng Politiko (2024–2025; Abante TeleTabloid)
- Makabayang Doktor (2005–2007; RPN, 2007–2008; NBN)
- Makikiraan Lang Po (2026–present; Radyo Pilipinas 1 Television)
- Malacañang Insider (2024; Radyo Pilipinas 1 Television)
- Malacañang Press Briefing (1990–2001, 2011–present; PTV, 2001–2011; NBN, 2022–2024; IBC)
- Manibela (2010–2016, 2019–present; UNTV)
- Manila Envelope (1985–1986; MBS/PTV)
- Manila Conversations (2025; Aliw 23)
- Manindigan (2017; TV5)
- Mano-Mano ni Anthony Taberna (2012–2013; Studio 23)
- Mare, Mag-Usap Tayo (RPN)
- Mark In, Mark Out (2023–present; Radyo Pilipinas 1 Television)
- Market Edge (2015–present; ANC, 2020; DZMM TeleRadyo/S+A)
- Matanglawin (2008–2020; ABS-CBN)
- Maunlad na Agrikultura (2011–2012; TV5/AksyonTV)
- May Gloria ang Bukas Mo (2001–2002; NBN)
- May Trabaho (2017–present; DZRH News Television/DZRH TV)
- May Trabaho Ka (2005–2008; QTV/Q)
- Maynila, Ito ang Pilipinas (2011–present; RHTV/DZRH News Television/DZRH TV)
- Memo (2026–present; Bilyonaryo News Channel)
- Media Ngayon (2025–present; Radyo Pilipinas 1 Television)
- MedTalk (2012–2018; Solar News Channel/9TV/CNN Philippines)
  - MedTalk Health Talk (2018–2024; CNN Philippines)
- Meet the Press (1982–1986; MBS, 1986–1988; PTV, 2008–2010; NBN)
- Metro (2006–2007; ABC)
- Metro One (2012–2013; PTV)
- Metro Sabado (2011–2019; AksyonTV, 2019–2020; One PH)
- MIB: Mga Imbestigador ng Bayan (1999; ABS-CBN)
- Mike Abe Live (2022–2025; PTV, 2022–2023; IBC, 2023–2025; Radyo Pilipinas 1 Television)
- Mission Possible (2015–2020; ABS-CBN/DZMM TeleRadyo, 2018–2020; Jeepney TV)
- Mission X (2001–2003; ABS-CBN)
- MMDA: On The Road (2002–2009; NBN)
- Mondo Manu (2011–2014; TV5/AksyonTV)
- Money Masters (2025–present; One PH/True TV)
- Money Talks with Cathy Yang (2025–present; One News)
- More Than Export (1990–1993; IBC)
- Morning Calls (2012–2020; AksyonTV, 2019–2020; One PH/TV5)
- Morning Chill (2024–2025; DWAN TV)
- MTRCB Uncut (PTV/Net 25/Inquirer 990 Television)
- Mukha (2014–2019; ABS-CBN (on occasional basis)/ANC/DZMM TeleRadyo)
- Munting Pangarap (2008–2018; UNTV)
- Mutya ng Masa (2013–2015; ABS-CBN, 2026–present; DZMM TeleRadyo/PRTV Prime Media)
- N.B.I. : Naku Bawal Ito! (2023–2024; Aliw 23)
- NAPC: Aksyon Laban sa Kahirapan (2023; PTV)
- Nation's Peacekeepers (2010–2011; IBC)
  - Nation's Peacekeeper's: Heroes at our Time (2012; PTV)
- Negosyoso (2017–present; CLTV)
- Network Briefing News (2020–2022; PTV/IBC, 2020–2021; One PH)
- Network Forum (2005–2007; NBN)
- Network Line (1982; PTV)
- News5 Imbestigasyon (2012–2013; TV5/AksyonTV)
- Newslight (1994–2001; New Vision 9/RPN)
- News Café (2012–2015; Solar News Channel/9TV)
- News.PH (2012–2017, 2020–2022; Solar News Channel/9TV/CNN Philippines)
- Ngayon na, Pinoy! (RPN)
- No Holds Barred (1986–1987; PTV)
- No Nonsense! (1991–1995; IBC)
- Nora Mismo (2002; NBN/IBC)
- Numero (2013–2014; TV5/AksyonTV)
- Obet P. sa IZ (2022–2023; IZTV, 2023–2024; Aliw 23)
- Off the Record (2001–2003; ABS-CBN)
- OK si Dok (2007–present; CLTV)
- Ombudsman: Kakampi mo Laban sa Katiwalian (2009–2011; NBN)
- OMJ: Oh My Job! (2020–2022; GMA News TV/GTV)
- On Assignment (2023–present; PTV)
- On Call: Serbisyong Totoo. Ngayon. (2011–2012; GMA News TV)
- On Point (2024–present; Bilyonaryo News Channel)
- On Record (2021–2022; GMA)
- On Scene: Emergency Response (RJTV)
- On the Ground (2023–present; PTV/IBC)
- One-Stop Shop (2017–present; CLTV)
- One Asean (2017–2018; PTV)
- One Media Network Forum (One Media)
- OOTD: Opinyon of the Day (2025–present; Abante TV)
- OOTD: Opisyal of the Day (2019; IBC)
- Open House with Gerry Cornejo (RJTV)
- Openline (2003–2007; Net 25)
- Operation Lokal (2023–2024; Radyo Pilipinas 1 Television)
- Opinyon at Desisyon (2003–2006; IBC)
- Oplan Asenso (2011–2019; AksyonTV, 2019–2020; One PH)
- Opposing Views (2013–2015; Solar News Channel/9TV)
- OPS-PIA: Ugnayan sa Hotel Rembrandt (1992–2001; New Vision 9/RPN/IBC)
- O.R.O: Obserbasyon, Reaksyon at Opinyon (2022–2023; IZTV)
- Operation Tulong (2007–present; TV Natin/RHTV/DZRH News Television/DZRH TV)
- Orly Mercado: All Ready! (2013–2019; AksyonTV/One PH)
- Otro Cinco (2022–2024; Radyo Pilipinas 1 Television)
- Our Doctors (1970; KBS)
- Over a Glass or Two (2023–2024; Jeepney TV)
- Overseas Filipino Watch (2025–2026; DWAN TV)
- Paano Kita Mapasasalamatan? (2020–2021; Kapamilya Channel/A2Z)
- Pag-usapan Natin (RJTV)
- Pag-Usapan Natin with Oscar Orbos (2025–present; PTV)
- Palaban (2006–2007; GMA)
- Paliwanag: The 2022 Election Townhall Series (2022; PTV)
- Panahon Na (2004; ABC)
- Panahon.TV (2012–2016; PTV, 2016–2023; DZRH News Television/DZRH TV, 2019–2023; One PH)
- Panalo Ka 'Nay! (2018; TV5)
- Pananaw (2008–2009; NBN)
- Pangungusap ng Pangulo (1987–1992; PTV)
- Para sa Masa (2023–present; Radyo Pilipinas 1 Television)
- Pareng Partners (2018–2019, 2020; ABS-CBN)
- Pasada (2023–2024; TeleRadyo Serbisyo, 2024; Prime TV)
- Pasada sa TeleRadyo (2020–2023; TeleRadyo)
- Pasada Sais Trenta (2007–2020; DZMM TeleRadyo)
  - Pasada Sais Trenta Sabado (2007–2014; DZMM TeleRadyo)
- Pasado Serbisyo (2023–2025; TeleRadyo Serbisyo, 2024–present; Prime TV/PRTV Prime Media, 2025–present; DZMM TeleRadyo)
- Passport on Wheels: An APO Documentary (2019–2020; PTV)
- Patakaran kasama si Atty. Tranquil Salvador III (2014–2019; Net 25)
- Patrol 117 (2001–2004; NBN)
- Patubig sa Bagong Pilipinas (2025–present; PTV)
- Payo Alternatibo (2016–2019; PTV)
- PBBM Bloc (2023–present; PTV/IBC)
- PBBM Podcast (2025–2026; D8TV)
- People Should Know with Antonio Cerilles (2024–present; DWAN TV)
- People, Politics and Power (2010–2012; NBN/PTV)
- People's Government Mobile Action (2008–2010; NBN)
- People's Privilege Hour (1986–1990; PTV)
- Perfect Morning (2011–2019; AksyonTV)
- Perfect Mornings (2026–present; One PH/True TV)
- Perspectives (2008–2009; NBN)
- Philippine Agenda (2007; GMA)
- Philippine Bay Watch (2025–present; PTV)
- Philippines Most Wanted (1998–2002; PTV/NBN)
- Pilipinas Ngayon Na! (2005–2009, 2010–2011; NBN, 2022–2023; IZTV, 2023–2026; Aliw 23, 2024–2026; DWIZ News TV)
- PinaSigla! (2025–present; DZMM TeleRadyo/PRTV Prime Media)
- Pinoy MD sa Super Radyo DZBB (2019–present; GMA News TV/GTV, 2023–2024; Pinoy Hits)
- Pinoy US Cops: Ride Along (2011–2012; AksyonTV, 2012–2018; PTV)
- Pintig ng Bayan (2023–2024; TeleRadyo Serbisyo, 2024; Prime TV)
- Piskante ng Bayan (2013–2021; Net 25)
- Plataporma Hindi Puro Porma (2025; DWAN TV)
- Point of Order (2025–present; Abante TV)
- Police and Other Matters (2011–2014; UNTV)
- Political Beat (2026–present; One News)
- Political Insider (2016–2017; CNN Philippines)
- Politiko Talks (2025–present; Bilyonaryo News Channel)
- Politiskoop (2024–2025; Abante TeleTabloid)
- Polwatch: Political Watch (2009–2016; UNTV)
- Pondahan ni Kuya Daniel (2013–2020; UNTV)
- Power Shift (2026–present; Bilyonaryo News Channel)
- Prangkahan (2003–2005; RPN)
- Prangkahan Na! (2025; Radyo Pilipinas 1 Television)
- Presinto 5 (2011–2013; AksyonTV, 2012–2013, 2025–present; TV5, 2025–present; RPTV/One PH)
- Pribado Publiko (2000–2010; UNTV)
- Problema N'yo, Sagot Ko! (2003–2005; NBN/ABC)
- Profiles (2015–2024; CNN Philippines)
- Pros & Cons with Usec. Joel Sy Egco (2018–2019; PTV, 2019; IBC)
- Proyekto Pilipino (2022–2024; Jeepney TV, 2024; All TV)
- PTV Special Forum (2012–2016; PTV)
- Public Access (1999; PTV)
- Public Atorni: Asunto o Areglo (2010–2012; TV5, 2012–2014; AksyonTV)
- Public Demand (2016; CLTV)
- Public Eye (1986, 2015–present; PTV, 2019; IBC)
- Public Forum (1987–1990; IBC, 1992–1994; ABC)
- Public Hearing (2005–2007; UNTV)
- Public Life with Randy David (1996–1998; GMA)
- Public Matters (2026–present; IBC/Congress TV)
- Public Service Hour (2021–present; DZRH News Television/DZRH TV)
- Pulis @ Ur Serbis (2012–2022, 2023–present; UNTV, 2022–2023; IZTV, 2023–2026; Aliw 23, 2024–2026; DWIZ News TV)
- Pulis! Pulis! (2008–2009; TV5)
- Pulis Ako, Pulis Nyo Po (2011–2012; PTV)
- Pulong Pulong sa Kaunlaran (1970s; PTV)
- Pulso ng Pilipino (2023–present; Radyo Pilipinas 1 Television)
- Pulsong Pinoy (2011–2012; RPN, 2011–2013; NBN/PTV/IBC)
- Punto Asintado Reload (2023–2025; PTV/Radyo Pilipinas 1 Television)
- Punto Legal (2008–2009; NBN)
- Puso ng Bayan PCSO Caravan (2012; PTV)
- Q Tube (2009–2010; Q)
- QUAT: Quick Action Team (2011–2015; UNTV)
- Radyo Bandido sa Telebisyon (2008; NBN)
- Radyo Kongreso sa Telebisyon (2007; IBC)
- Radyo Publiko Serbisyo (2025–present; Radyo Pilipinas 1 Television/PTV)
- Raket Science (2020–2022; One PH)
- Rapido sa RJTV (RJTV)
- Ratsada Balita (2000–2006; RPN)
- Reaksyon (2012–2017; TV5/AksyonTV)
- Reaksyon: Aplikante (2013; TV5/AksyonTV)
- Real Life Stories with Ate Rose Lin (2024; IBC)
- Real Stories kasama si Loren (2004–2007; ABC)
- RealiTV: Mga Bidyong Nakakabilib (2015; ABS-CBN)
- Reality Check (2023–present; Net 25)
- Red Alert (2014–2015, 2015–2019; ABS-CBN, 2015–2019; DZMM TeleRadyo, 2018–2019; Jeepney TV)
- Reklamo, I-Abante Mo (2025; Abante TeleTabloid)
- Relasyon (2011–2019; AksyonTV, 2019–2020; One PH)
- Report Kay Boss (2013–2016; PTV/IBC)
- Republic Service (2008–2009; NBN)
- Rescue 5 (2013–2014; TV5/AksyonTV)
- Rescue Mission (2008–2009; TV5)
- Resibo: Walang Lusot ang May Atraso (2023–present; GMA, 2023; GTV, 2023–2024; Pinoy Hits)
- Responde: Mata ng Mamamayan (2021–present; Net 25)
  - Responde: Tugon, Aksyon, Ngayon (2011–2019; Net 25)
- Reunions (2008–2011; Q)
- Roadside (2025; Abante TeleTabloid)
- Rotary in Action (2010–2020; UNTV)
- RPN Forum (2003–2005; RPN)
- Rx Men (2005–2008; QTV/Q)
- RX: Nutrisyon at Kalusugan (2011; IBC)
- Sa Bayan... (2000–2001; RPN)
- Sa Ganang Mamamayan (2013–present; Net 25)
- Sa Likod ng Balita (airs annually, 2018–2019; ABS-CBN, 2019; DZMM TeleRadyo, 2020; TeleRadyo, 2020–present; Kapamilya Channel, 2022–present; A2Z/ANC)
- Sa Likod ng Istorya (2012; PTV)
- Sa Totoo Lang kasama si Erwin Tulfo (2017–2018; PTV)
- Safe Space (2023–2025; TeleRadyo Serbisyo, 2024–present; Prime TV/PRTV Prime Media, 2025–present; DZMM TeleRadyo)
- Sagot Kita (2024–2026; True FM TV/True TV)
- Sagot Ko Yan! (2007–2009, 2013–2020; DZMM TeleRadyo, 2020–2021; TeleRadyo)
- Sagot ni Doc (2026–present; All TV)
- Saklolo (2012–2013; ABS-CBN)
- Saklolo Abugado (2001; IBC, 2003–2005; NBN/ABC)
- Sakto Kay Paolo, Sakto rin Kay Cherie (2011–2014; AksyonTV)
- Saktong Tapatan (2025; Abante TeleTabloid)
- Salamat Dok (2004–2020; ABS-CBN/ANC)
- Salamin ng Buhay (2017–present; CLTV)
- Salandigan (ABS-CBN Bacolod)
- Sana'y Muling Makapiling (2005–2008; QTV/Q)
- Sandigan ng Bayan (2024–2026; Aliw 23/DWIZ News TV)
- Sapol ni Jarius Bondoc (2022–2023; IZTV, 2023–present; Aliw 23, 2024–present; DWIZ News TV)
- Sapol Sabado (2018–2026; DZRH News Television/DZRH TV)
- SCWC Konek (2022–2023; IZTV, 2023–2024; Aliw 23)
- Serbis on the Go (2004–2008; IBC)
- Serbisyo All Access (2014–2017, Solar News Channel/9TV/CNN Philippines)
- Serbisyo Muna (2005–2008; NBN, 2024; PTV)
- Serbisyo Pilipinas (2023–2024; Radyo Pilipinas 1 Television)
- Serbisyo Publiko (2004–2014; UNTV)
- Serbisyong Bayan ni Tatay Rannie (2022–2023; IZTV, 2023–2026; Aliw 23, 2024–2026; DWIZ News TV)
- Serbisyong Bayanihan (2020–present; UNTV)
- Serbisyong DSWD for Every Juan (2025; TeleRadyo Serbisyo, 2025–2026; PRTV Prime Media/DZMM TeleRadyo)
- Serbisyong Kapatid (2017–2019; AksyonTV)
- Serbisyong Kasangbahay (2016–2020; UNTV)
- Serbisyong Lubos sa 882 (2022–2023; IZTV)
- Serbisyo Publiko sa Abante Radyo (2025; Abante TeleTabloid)
- Session Unplugged (2025–present; DWAN TV)
- Share Ko Lang (2023–2024; TeleRadyo Serbisyo, 2024; Prime TV)
- Short Take (2020–2021; One PH)
- Shout Out: Sigaw ng Kabataan! (2016–2018; GMA News TV)
- Si Manoy Ang Ninong Ko (2024; GMA)
- Siyento por Siyento (2023–present; Net 25)
- So to Speak (2008–present; CLTV)
- Social TV: Anything and Everything about Metro Central Luzon (2016–2017; CLTV)
  - Agri Ka Ba?
  - Asenso Sigurado
  - Centro: TV Program of City of San Fernando, Pampanga
  - Ibang Klase Talaga
  - Kabaro
  - Usapang Biz-ness
- SOS: Serbisyo on the Spot (2020; GMA News TV)
- SOS: Special on Saturday (2013–present; DZRH News Television/DZRH TV)
  - #ECCWorkRelated sa Special on Saturday (2019–2021, 2023–present; DZRH News Television/DZRH TV)
- Special Assignment (2003–2005; ABS-CBN)
- Spot Report (2023–2025; TeleRadyo Serbisyo, 2024–present; Prime TV/PRTV Prime Media, 2025–present; DZMM TeleRadyo)
- Square Off (2006–2020; ANC)
- SRO: Suhestyon, Reaksyon at Opinyon (2010–2020; DZMM TeleRadyo, 2020–2023; TeleRadyo)
- SSS: Kabalikat Natin (2010–2011; IBC)
- Stop Watch (1986–1994; RPN/New Vision 9)
- Story Outlook (2023–2025; TeleRadyo Serbisyo, 2024–present; Prime TV/PRTV Prime Media, 2025–present; DZMM TeleRadyo)
- Storyline (2008–2015; ANC, 2010–2013; ABS-CBN, 2011; DZMM TeleRadyo)
- Straight from the Shoulder (1987–1994; GMA)
- Straight Shot (2025–present; PTV)
- Street Pulse (1986; RPN)
- Strictly Politics (2000–2011; ANC)
- Sulong na Bayan (2022–2023; IZTV, 2023–2026; Aliw 23, 2024–2026; DWIZ News TV)
- Sulong Pilipinas! (2019; PTV)
- Sumbong N'yo, Aksyon Agad (2023–present; UNTV)
- Swak na Swak (2006–2020; ABS-CBN, 2020–2021; ANC/Kapamilya Channel)
- T3: Kapatid, Sagot Kita! (2011–2012; TV5/AksyonTV)
  - T3: Reload (2012–2014; TV5/AksyonTV)
  - T3: Enforced (2014–2015; TV5)
  - T3: Alliance (2015–2016; TV5)
- Tahanan ng OFW (2025–present; Radyo Pilipinas 1 Television)
- Take Out (2012–2014; TV5)
- Takip Silip (2008–2011; NBN)
- Talakayan Ngayon (CLTV)
- Talakayan sa Isyung Pulis (2007–2011; NBN)
- Talk Ko 'To! (2005–2008; NBN)
- Talking Heads (2024–present; DWAN TV)
- Talking Points: Ang Tinig ng Serbisyo Publiko (2011–2012; NBN/PTV)
- Talking Points with Rose Solangon (2015–2019; GMA News TV)
- Tambalang Failon at Sanchez (2007–2009; DZMM TeleRadyo)
- Tambalang Failon at Webb (2009–2011; DZMM TeleRadyo)
- Tambayan sa DWIZ (2022; IZTV)
- Tandem! (2010–2020; DZMM TeleRadyo/TeleRadyo)
  - Lima at Oro: Tandem! (2010–2018; DZMM TeleRadyo)
  - Lima at Logan: Tandem! (2018–2020; DZMM TeleRadyo/TeleRadyo)
- Tandem with David at Jon (2023–2024; Aliw 23)
- Tao Po! (2023–2026; Kapamilya Channel/A2Z/ANC, 2023; TeleRadyo, 2026; All TV)
- Tapatan Kay Luis Beltran (1987–1988; IBC)
- Tapatan ni Tunying (2013–2015, 2015–2019; ABS-CBN, 2015–2019; DZMM TeleRadyo, 2018–2019; Jeepney TV)
- Tapatan with Jay Sonza (1995–1998; GMA, 2000–2001; RPN, 2004–2005; UNTV)
- Task Force Siyasat (2002–2003; NBN)
- Tatak Pilipino (1990–1995; ABS-CBN)
- Tatak Rod Navarro (2024–2025; Abante TeleTabloid)
- Tatak Serbisyo (2023–2025; TeleRadyo Serbisyo, 2024–2025; Prime TV/PRTV Prime Media)
- Tayuan Mo at Panindigan (2011–2012; AksyonTV)
- Tech Ka Muna (2020–2022; One PH)
- Tech Sabado (2015–2019; AksyonTV, 2019–2020; One PH)
- Tech Trip (2010; TV5)
- Teka! Teka! Teka! (RPN)
- Teka Muna (2013–2018; DZMM TeleRadyo)
- Teleaga (2003–2005; NBN)
- TeleRadyo Serbisyo Rewind (2023; TeleRadyo Serbisyo)
- That's My Job! (2008; ABC)
- The Big Story (1992–1995; ABC)
- The Breaking Point (2016–2017; PTV)
- The Chatroom (2022–2023; PTV)
- The Chiefs (2018–2023; One News, 2019–2020, 2022, 2023; TV5)
- The Dean Mel Show (2020–2022; One PH)
- The Estrada Presidency (1998–2001; RPN/PTV/IBC)
- The Exchange (2020–2024; CNN Philippines)
- The Final Say, Cha-Cha! (2006–2007; NBN)
- The Financial District (2022–2024; IZTV, 2023–2024; Aliw 23, 2024; DWIZ News TV)
- The Game Changer (2024–present; D8TV)
- The Good Story (2023; IBC)
- The Healthy Life (2012–2015; Light TV/GMA News TV)
- The Inside Story (1990–1998; ABS-CBN)
- The Keithley Report (1986; IBC)
- The Legal Weapon (2024–2026; DWAN TV)
- The Newsmakers (2026–present; Aliw 23)
- The New Bob Garon Debates (2001; SBN)
- The PH Insider (2025–present; D8TV)
- The Police Hour (1992–2007; New Vision 9/RPN)
- The Service Road (2016–2017; CNN Philippines)
- The Spokes (2025–present; Bilyonaryo News Channel)
- The Source (2016–2024; CNN Philippines)
- The Vaxplainer (2021–2023; PTV)
- The Veronica Chronicles (2012–2017; PTV)
- The Way Forward (2025; Aliw 23)
- The Weakend News with Ramon Bautista (2008–2009; TV5)
- The Working President (2001–2010; RPN/PTV/NBN/IBC)
- Thinking Pinoy on SMNI (2020–2021; SMNI/SMNI News Channel)
- Timbangan (2010; TV5)
- TimesFour (RPN)
- Tinig Bayan (1986–1993; PTV)
- Tinig ng Bayan (2005–2007; NBN)
- Tinig ng Kababaihan (2023–present; Radyo Pilipinas 1 Television)
- Tinig ng Marino (2014–2016; UNTV, 2019; PTV)
- Tinig ng OFW (2026–present; Aliw 23)
- Tipanan sa Barangay (2001; PTV)
- Tipid Trip (2008–2015; RHTV/DZRH News Television)
- To Saudi with Love (2000; RPN)
- Todo-Todo Walang Preno (2007–2020; DZMM TeleRadyo/TeleRadyo)
- Todong Nationwide Talakayan (2022–2023; IZTV/Aliw 23)
- Trabaho Panalo! (2008–2014; DZMM TeleRadyo)
- Trade Talks (2025–present; Bilyonaryo News Channel)
- Traffic Center (2015–2024; CNN Philippines)
- TranspoDOTCom (2006–2009; NBN)
- Trends (1984–1986; MBS/PTV)
- Treze Mornings (2026–present; IBC/DWAN TV)
- Tugon (1986; PTV)
- Tugon sa Pangarap (2012; PTV)
- Tulay Pilipino (2026; Aliw 23/DWIZ News TV)
- Tulay: Your Bridge to Understanding, Peace and Prosperity (2016–2022; PTV)
- Tulong Abante (2025–present; Abante TV)
- Turning Point (2017–2018; TV5)
- Tutok Erwin Tulfo (2020–2022; PTV)
- Tutok PDEA: Kontra Droga (2020–2022; PTV)
- Ugnayang Pambansa (2001–2003; NBN, 2001–2002; IBC, 2003–2005; RPN)
- Unbiased (2018–2019; RJ DigiTV)
- United Nations Hour (1987; PTV)
- Unlad Pilipinas with Ceasar Soriano (2019–2022; PTV)
- Unpopular Opinion (2026–present; Bilyonaryo News Channel)
- Up Close and Personal with Marissa del Mar (2002–2011; IBC)
- Up Up Pilipinas (2022–2023; IZTV, 2023–2026; Aliw 23, 2024–2026; DWIZ News TV)
- Usap-Usapan! (2023–2025; Radyo Pilipinas 1 Television)
- Usapang Business (1996–2002; ABS-CBN)
- Usapang de Campanilla (2007–2020; DZMM TeleRadyo)
- Usapang Kalye (2020; DZMM TeleRadyo/ANC, 2020–2021; TeleRadyo)
- Usapang Kapa-Ted (2019–2020; One PH)
- Usapang Kongreso (1990–1994; PTV)
- Usaping Legal (2023–present; Radyo Pilipinas 1 Television)
- Usapang Legal with Willie (2006–2007; RJTV)
- Usapang Pulitika (2009–2010; NBN)
- Usapang Real Life (2020–2021; TV5)
- Usapang Senado (2022–2023; IZTV, 2023–present; Aliw 23, 2024–present; DWIZ News TV)
- Usapang SSS (2018–2019; PTV, 2022–2023; DZRH TV)
- Usapang STL: Sa Totoo Lang (2023–2026; Aliw 23, 2024–2026; DWIZ News TV)
- Usaping Bayan (SMNI)
- Usaping Legal (2023–present; Radyo Pilipinas 1 Television)
- Uswag Pinas (2020–2022; PTV/IBC)
- Versus (2017; TV5)
- Viewpoint (1984–1994; GMA)
- Voices of Hope (2026–present; IBC)
- Wag Po! (2019–2020; TV5, 2019–2023; One PH)
- Wagi (CLTV)
- Walang Atrasan (2024–2025; Abante TeleTabloid, 2025–present; Abante TV)
- Walang Atrasan Tonite (2024–2025; Abante TeleTabloid)
- Wanted sa Radyo (2011–2019; AksyonTV, 2019–present; One PH, 2024–present; RPTV, 2024; TV5/True FM TV, 2024–present; True TV)
- Wanted: Ang Serye (2021; TV5/One Screen)
- Warrior Angel (2016–2020; Inquirer 990 Television)
- Wasak (2011–2016; AksyonTV, 2013; TV5)
- Wats UP sa Barangay (1993–1994; New Vision 9)
- With Due Respect (2025–present; PRTV Prime Media)
- Woman in Action (2022–2023; One News/One PH, 2023; TV5)
- WomanWatch with Nikki Coseteng: It's About Time (1987–1994; PTV)
- Women's Desk (2005–2008; QTV/Q)
- Word of the Lourd (2013–2014; TV5/AksyonTV)
- Work Related (2025–present; Aliw 23/DWIZ News TV)
- World Class (RPN)
- WPS: West Philippine Sea (2024–present; DZRH TV)
- Yaman ng Bayan (2014; TV5/AksyonTV)
- Yaman sa Kailaliman (2018–2019; PTV)
- Yan ang Marino (2009–2021, 2022–present; NBN/PTV)
- Young Guns on the Move (2024; PTV/Congress TV)
- Youth for Truth (2020–2022; PTV/IBC)
- Zoom In (2024–present; Aliw 23, 2025; RPTV)

== Documentaries ==
- Anatomy of a Disaster (2010–2011; GMA)
- ANC Documentary Hour (2015–present; ANC)
- Ang Pagbabago (2006; GMA)
- ASEAN @ 50: Historical Milestones (2018–2022; PTV)
- ASEAN Documentaries (2017–present; PTV)
  - ASEAN Women Entrepreneurship (2022–present; PTV)
  - Faces of ASEAN (2022–present; PTV)
  - Proudly ASEAN (2022–present; PTV)
- ASEAN 101 (2019; IBC)
- ASEAN: Community and Its Three Pillars (2017–2022; PTV)
- ASEAN Creative Film in Response to COVID-19 (2023–2025; PTV)
- ASEAN Now and The Future II: Discover New Buenavista (2017–2023; PTV)
- ASEAN Spotlight TV (2016–2019; PTV, 2019–2022; IBC)
- Balitang K (1996–2001; ABS-CBN)
- Bingit (2013; GMA)
- Bongga Ka Star (2006; QTV)
- Born to Be Wild (2007–present; GMA, 2023–2024; Pinoy Hits)
- Brigada Siete (1993–2001; GMA)
  - Brigada (2011–2024; GMA News TV/GTV, 2023–2024; Pinoy Hits)
- Bright Ideas (2016–present; Bloomberg TV Philippines/One News)
- Building Bridges (2018–2019, 2021–2024; CNN Philippines)
- Calvento Files (1995–1998; ABS-CBN)
- Case Unclosed (2008–2010; GMA)
- Chances Are (2009–2010; Q)
- Cheche Lazaro Presents (1999–2003; GMA, 2010–2014; ABS-CBN)
- Chronicles (2018–present; One News)
- Crime Klasik (2011–2013; AksyonTV, 2013; TV5)
- Dayaw (2015–2021; ANC)
- Dokumentado (2010–2011, 2012–2013; TV5, 2012–2013; AksyonTV)
- Dokyu (2005–2007; ABC)
- DoQmentaries (2008–2009; Q)
- DZRH Correspondents (2021; DZRH News Television)
- DZRH Stories: Pinoy Documentaries (2022–present; DZRH News Television/DZRH TV)
- EBC Earth Files (2002–2011; IBC)
- Emergency (1995–2009; GMA)
- Footprints (2010–2012, Net 25)
- Friday's Action Pack
  - When Good Pets Gone Bad (2014; S+A)
  - When Stunts Go Bad (2014; S+A)
  - World's Deadliest Sea Creatures (2014; S+A)
  - World's Deadliest Storms (2014; S+A)
  - World's Scariest Police Shootouts (2014; S+A)
  - World's Worst Drivers: Caught on Tape (2014; S+A)
- Front Row (2011–2014, 2020; GMA News TV, 2014–2020, 2021; GMA)
- Gretchen Ho Reports (2024–present; One News)
- Gus Abelgas Forensics (2023–present; One PH/TV5)
- Gus Abelgas: Nag-Uulat (2002–2003; ABS-CBN)
- History with Lourd (2013–2016; TV5/AksyonTV)
- Homegrowth: The Untold Stories of Sports and Tourism (2025–present; One News)
- Hoy Bawal Yan (2024–present; DZRH TV)
- I Survived: Hindi Sumusuko Ang Pinoy (2009–2010; ABS-CBN)
- Images of Japan (2018–2023; PTV)
- Imbestigador (2000–2023; GMA, 2023; Pinoy Hits)
- INCTV Documentary (2021–present; INC TV)
- Investigative Documentaries (2011–2020; GMA News TV)
- i-Witness (1999–2020, 2021–present; GMA, 2020–2021; GMA News TV, 2023; Pinoy Hits)
- Japan in Focus (2019–2023; PTV)
- Japan Video Topics (2003–2010; IBC, 2016–2023; PTV, 2025–present; Light TV)
- Jessica Soho Reports (2001–2005; GMA)
- Kaagapay (2006–2016; UNTV)
- Kapatid Dokyu (2026; TV5)
- Kasosyo TV (2023; Light TV)
- Kaya (2014–2016; TV5)
- KBYN: Kaagapay ng Bayan (2022–2023; Kapamilya Channel/A2Z/TeleRadyo)
- Krusada (2010–2013; ABS-CBN, 2011–2012; DZMM TeleRadyo)
- Kuha Mo! (2019–2020; ABS-CBN/DZMM TeleRadyo/ANC/Jeepney TV, 2020; Kapamilya Channel/TeleRadyo)
  - Kuha All! (2022–2024; All TV)
- Lakbai (2017; TV5)
- Lakbayin ang Magandang Pilipinas (2003–2024; NBN/PTV)
- Misteryo (2010; Q, 2010–2011; GMA)
- Motorcycle Diaries (2011–2017; GMA News TV)
- Na-Scam Ka Na Ba? (2006; QTV)
- Nagmamahal, Kapamilya (2006–2007; ABS-CBN)
- Negosyuniversity (2020–present; INC TV)
- New Normal: The Survival Guide (2020; GMA News TV)
- Newsmakers (2020; GMA News TV)
- NHK Documentaries (2018–2023; PTV)
- OFW Diaries (2009–2011; GMA)
- On Record (2021–2022; GTV)
- One News Documentaries (2019–present; One News, 2020; One PH)
- One Proud Mama (2008–2009; Q)
- Out of Control (2013–2014; GMA)
- Paano Kita Mapasasalamatan? (2020–2021; Kapamilya Channel/A2Z)
- Patrol ng Pilipino (2010–2013; ABS-CBN, 2011–2012; ANC)
- Philippines' Most Shocking Stories (2025–present; ABS-CBN News)
- Pinoy Abroad (2005–2006; GMA)
- Pinoy Crime Stories (2023–2024; GMA, 2023; Pinoy Hits)
- Pinoy Meets World (2006–2009; GMA)
- Pipol (1999–2006; ABS-CBN, 2011–2014; ANC)
- Planet XP (2026; GMA)
- Point of View (2025–present; DZRH TV)
- Possessed (2025–present; ABS-CBN News)
- Private I (2003–2005; ABS-CBN)
- Probe (1987–1988, 2005–2010; ABS-CBN)
- Proudly Filipina (2006–2009; QTV/Q)
- Pusong Wagi (2005–2006; QTV)
- Rated K (2004–2020; ABS-CBN, 2004–2018; ANC, 2017–2020; DZMM TeleRadyo, 2018–2020; Jeepney TV, 2020; TeleRadyo)
  - Rated Korina (2012–2014; DZMM TeleRadyo, 2020–2025, 2026–present; TV5, 2020–2023; One PH, 2021–present; Kapamilya Channel/A2Z, 2025–present; All TV)
- Real People (1981–1985; GMA)
- Reel Time (2011–2020; GMA News TV)
- Reporter's Notebook (2004–2020, 2021, 2023–present; GMA, 2020, 2021–2023; GMA News TV/GTV, 2023; Pinoy Hits)
- Rescue (2010–2013; GMA)
- Resilience Against Disaster (2019–2023; PTV)
- Sa Likod ng Kontrobersya (2023–2025; DZRH TV)
- Saving ASEAN Natural Treasures (2011–2012; NBN/PTV)
- Simpleng Hiling (2003–2004; ABS-CBN)
- Sine Totoo (2007–2009; GMA)
- Siyasat: DWIZ Investigative Reports (2024–2025; Aliw 23/DWIZ News TV)
- SMNI Special Reports (SMNI)
- Someone's on Your Side (1987–1989; GMA)
- Staying Alive (1980; BBC)
- Stories of Hope (2021–2022; GMA/GTV)
- S.O.C.O.: Scene of the Crime Operatives (2005–2020; ABS-CBN, 2005–2011; ANC, 2010–2011; Studio 23, 2011–2012, 2017–2020; DZMM TeleRadyo, 2020; TeleRadyo, 2020, 2026–present; Kapamilya Channel, 2025–2026; iWant, 2026–present; A2Z/All TV)
- S.O.C.O. sa DZMM (2007–2020, 2026–present; DZMM TeleRadyo, 2026–present; PRTV Prime Media)
- S.O.S.: Stories of Survival (2005–2008; ABC)
- Taas Noo, Bulakenyo! (2007–2008; NBN)
  - Taas Noo, Pilipino! (2007–2008; NBN)
- Takip Silip (2008–2011; NBN)
- The Atom Araullo Specials (2018–present; GMA)
- The Beauties of Nature (2019–2023; PTV)
- The Better News (2019–2020, 2021–present; DZRH News Television/DZRH TV)
- The Correspondents (1998–2010; ABS-CBN)
- The Probe Team (1988–2003; GMA)
- The Probe Team Documentaries (2004–2005; ABC)
- The Story of the Filipino (2016–2024; CNN Philippines)
- Totoo TV (2005–2007; ABC, 2010–2011; TV5, 2011; AksyonTV)
- True Stories (2010–2011; Q)
- Tulong Ko, Pasa Mo (2017; TV5/AksyonTV, 2018–2020; DZMM TeleRadyo, 2020–2023; TeleRadyo)
- Tunay na Buhay (2011–2020, 2021; GMA, 2020; GMA News TV, 2021–2022; GTV)
- Tutok Tulfo (2010–2012; TV5, 2011–2012; AksyonTV)
- Ugnayang Pambansa (2001–2003; NBN)
- Unang Tikim (2014–2015; TV5/AksyonTV)
- USI: Under Special Investigation (2010–2012; TV5, 2011–2012; AksyonTV)
- Velez This Week (1987–1990; GMA)
- Victim (2003–2004; ABS-CBN)
  - Victim: Undercover (2004–2005; ABS-CBN)
- What I See (2013–2015; CNN Philippines)
- XXX: Exklusibong, Explosibong, Exposé (2006–2013; ABS-CBN/ANC, 2010–2011; Studio 23, 2011–2012; DZMM TeleRadyo)

== Drama anthologies and series ==
- 'Til Death Do Us Part (2005; ABS-CBN)
- 1DOL (2010; ABS-CBN)
- 24/7 (2020; ABS-CBN)
- 5 Star Specials (2010; TV5)
- A Beautiful Affair (2012–2013; ABS-CBN)
- A Family Affair (2022; Kapamilya Channel/A2Z/TV5/Jeepney TV)
- Adik Sa'Yo (2009; GMA)
- Agila (1987–1989; RPN, 1989–1992; ABS-CBN)
- Aiko Drama Special (1989–1995; IBC/Islands TV 13)
- Akin Pa Rin ang Bukas (2013; GMA)
- Ako si Kim Samsoon (2008; GMA)
- Akusada (2025; GMA)
- Alagad (1993; IBC)
- All About Adam (2010; IBC)
- All About Eve (2009; GMA)
- All My Life (2009; GMA)
- Amo (2018; TV5/Netflix)
- And I Love You So (2015–2016; ABS-CBN)
- Ang Babaeng Hinugot sa Aking Tadyang (2009; GMA)
- Ang Dalawang Ikaw (2021; GMA)
- Ang Dalawang Mrs. Real (2014; GMA)
- Ang Forever Ko'y Ikaw (2018; GMA)
- Ang Makulay Na Daigdig ni Nora (1974–1979; RPN)
- Ang Munting Paraiso (1999–2002; ABS-CBN)
- Ang Pangarap Kong Jackpot (produced by PCSO) (1995–2007; RPN)
- Ang Utol Kong Hoodlum (2011; TV5)
- Apoy sa Dagat (2013; ABS-CBN)
- Apoy sa Dugo (2026; GMA)
- AraBella (2023; GMA/Pinoy Hits)
- Artikulo 247 (2022; GMA)
- Ate ng Ate Ko (2020; TV5)
- Avenues of the Diamond (2025; Viva One)
- Babangon Ako't Dudurugin Kita (2008; GMA)
- Babawiin Ko ang Lahat (2021; GMA)
- Bad Genius: The Series (2025; Viva One, 2025–2026; TV5)
- Baker King (2015; TV5)
- Bakit Ba Ganyan? (2002–2004; RPN)
- Bakit Manipis ang Ulap? (2016; TV5)
- Bayan Ko (2013; GMA News TV)
- Beautiful Strangers (2015; GMA)
- Beauty Empire (2025; GMA/GTV/Viu)
- Beauty Queen (2010–2011; GMA)
- Beki Boxer (2014; TV5)
- Bella Bandida (2020; TV5)
- Bihag (2019; GMA)
- Bilangin ang Bituin sa Langit (2020–2021; GMA)
- Binoy Henyo (2013; GMA)
- Biritera (2012; GMA)
- Bisperas ng Kasaysayan (1994–1995; New Vision 9/RPN)
- Blood vs Duty (2026; Kapamilya Channel/A2Z/All TV/Jeepney TV/Netflix/iWant)
- Blusang Itim (2011; GMA)
- Bolera (2022; GMA/GTV)
- Boracay (1990; New Vision 9)
- Born for You (2016; ABS-CBN)
- Broken Vow (2012; GMA)
- Bukas May Kahapon (2019; IBC)
- Bukas na Lang Kita Mamahalin (2013; ABS-CBN)
- Bukod Kang Pinagpala (2013; GMA)
- Cain at Abel (2018–2019; GMA)
- Calla Lily (2006; ABS-CBN)
- Calle Siete (2016; GMA)
- Calvento Files (1995–1998; ABS-CBN)
- Campus Romance (1998–1999; GMA)
- Candies (2005–2006; QTV)
- Carmela (2014; GMA)
- Carpool (2020; TV5)
- Cattleya Killer (2023; Amazon Prime Video)
- Cebu (1991–1992; New Vision 9)
- Claudine (2010; GMA)
- Cielo de Angelina (2012–2013; GMA)
- Click (1999–2004; GMA)
- Click, Like, Share (2021–2022; iWantTFC/Kapamilya Channel/A2Z)
- Codename: Asero (2008; GMA)
- Coffee Prince (2012; GMA)
- Coney Reyes - Mumar on the Set (1981–1984; RPN)
  - Coney Reyes on Camera (1984–1989; RPN, 1989–1998; ABS-CBN)
- Count My Blessings (2008–2009; NBN)
- Crazy for You (2006; ABS-CBN)
- D' Originals (2017; GMA)
- Dading (2014; GMA)
- Dahil sa Iyong Paglisan (2006–2008; QTV/Q)
- Dahil sa Pag-ibig (2012; ABS-CBN)
  - Dahil sa Pag-ibig (2019; GMA)
- Daisy Siete (2003–2010; GMA)
- Davao: Ang Gintong Pag-Asa (1991–1992; New Vision 9)
- Dear Friend (2008–2010; GMA)
- Dear God (2022; iWantTFC/KTX/TV5)
- Dear Manilyn (1988–1991; RPN/New Vision 9)
- Dear Teacher (1990–1992; IBC/Islands TV 13)
- Delivery Boi (2026–present; GMA)
- Descendants of the Sun (2020; GMA)
- Destined to be Yours (2017; GMA)
- Destiny Rose (2015–2016; GMA)
- Di Ba't Ikaw (1999; GMA)
- Di Na Muli (2021; TV5)
- Dirty Linen (2023; Kapamilya Channel/A2Z/TV5/Jeepney TV)
- Diva (2010; GMA)
- Diyos Ko, Mahal Mo Ba Sila? (2005–2007; NBN)
- Dormitoryo (2013; GMA)
- Dula ng Buhay (2026–present; AllRadio TV)
- Echoes of the Heart (2022–2023; IZTV/Aliw 23)
- Encounter: The Philippine Adaptation (2021; TV5)
- Endless Love (2010; GMA)
- Eva Fonda (2008–2009; ABS-CBN)
- Faithfully (2012; GMA)
- Familia Zaragoza (1996–1997; ABS-CBN)
- First Time (2010; GMA)
- First Yaya (2021; GMA/GTV/Heart of Asia)
  - First Lady (2022; GMA/GTV)
- Flordeluna (1979–1984, 1987–1988; RPN)
  - Maria Flordeluna (2007; ABS-CBN)
- Flower of Evil (2022–2023; Viu/Kapamilya Channel/A2Z)
- For Love or Money (2013–2014; TV5)
- For the Love (2023; TV5)
- Forever in My Heart (2004–2005; GMA)
- Forever Young (2024–2025; GMA)
- Forevermore (2014–2015; ABS-CBN)
- Fractured (2024; Kapamilya Channel/A2Z)
- Full House (2009–2010; GMA)
- Futbolilits (2011; GMA)
- Ganyan Kita Kamahal (1998; GMA)
- Genesis (2013; GMA)
- Give Love on Christmas (2014–2015; ABS-CBN)
- Glamorosa (2011–2012; TV5)
- GMA Drama Studio Presents (2000–2001; GMA)
- GMA Love Stories (1999–2002; GMA)
- GMA Mini-Series (1999–2001; GMA)
  - Liwanag ng Hatinggabi (1999–2000; GMA)
  - Umulan Man o Umaraw (2000; GMA)
  - Munting Anghel (2000; GMA)
- GMA Telesine Specials (1993–2003; GMA)
- GMA True Stories (1994–1997; GMA)
- Green Rose (2011; ABS-CBN)
- Gulong ng Buhay (1981–1983; RPN)
- Gulong ng Palad (1977–1979, 1983–1985; BBC/City2, 1979–1981; RPN)
  - Gulong ng Palad (2006; ABS-CBN)
- Guns and Roses (2011; ABS-CBN)
- Habang May Buhay (2000–2001; IBC)
  - Habang May Buhay (2010; ABS-CBN)
- Hahamakin ang Lahat (2016–2017; GMA)
- Hanggang Makita Kang Muli (2016; GMA)
- Hawak Kamay (2014; ABS-CBN)
- Hawak Ko ang Langit (2003; GMA)
- Healing Hearts (2015; GMA)
- Heartful Café (2021; GMA/GTV/Heart of Asia)
- Hearts on Ice (2023; GMA/GTV/I Heart Movies/Pinoy Hits)
- Hello, Heart (2021–2022; iQiyi, 2023; Kapamilya Channel/A2Z)
- Heredero (1984–1987; RPN)
- Hinahanap-Hanap Kita (2019; iWant, 2020; Kapamilya Channel)
- Hindi Ka na Mag-iisa (2012; GMA)
- Hiram na Alaala (2014–2015; GMA)
- Hiram na Anak (2019; GMA)
- Hiram na Puso (2012; GMA)
- Hongkong Flight 143 (2006; GMA)
- Hooo U (2006; GMA)
- House of Lies (2026; GMA)
- How to Move On in 30 Days (2022; ABS-CBN Entertainment, 2023; Kapamilya Channel/A2Z)
- How to Spot a Red Flag (2024–2025; Viu, 2025; Kapamilya Channel/Jeepney TV/A2Z/TV5)
- Huwag Ka Lang Mawawala (2013; ABS-CBN)
- I Am U (2020; iWant, 2023; Kapamilya Channel/A2Z)
- I Can See You (2020–2022; GMA, 2021; GTV, 2022; Heart of Asia)
- I Got You (2020–2021; TV5)
- I Heart Davao (2017; GMA)
- I Heart You, Pare! (2011; GMA)
- I Left My Heart in Sorsogon (2021–2022; GMA/GTV/Heart of Asia)
- I Luv NY (2006; GMA)
- IBC Love Stories (1993; IBC)
- Iisa Pa Lamang (2008; ABS-CBN)
- Ikaw ay Pag-Ibig (2011–2012; ABS-CBN)
- Ilustrado (2014; GMA)
- Impostora (2007; GMA)
  - Impostora (2017–2018; GMA)
- Inagaw na Bituin (2019; GMA)
- InstaDad (2015; GMA)
- Isang Dakot na Luha (2012; TV5)
- It's Okay to Not Be Okay (2025; Kapamilya Channel/A2Z/TV5/Jeepney TV/Netflix/iWant)
- Joyride (2004–2005; GMA)
- Juan Happy Love Story (2016; GMA)
- Juanita Banana (2010–2011; ABS-CBN)
- Judy Ann Drama Special (1999–2001; ABS-CBN)
- K (IBC)
- Kahapon Lamang (1976–1986; GMA)
- Kahit Isang Saglit (2008; ABS-CBN)
- Kahit Kailan (2002–2003; GMA)
- Kahit Konting Pagtingin (2013; ABS-CBN)
- Kahit Nasaan Ka Man (2013; GMA)
- Kailan Ba Tama ang Mali? (2015; GMA)
- Kailangan Ko'y Ikaw (2013; ABS-CBN)
- Kapag May Katwiran... Ipaglaban Mo! (1988–1992; IBC/Islands TV 13, 1992–1999; ABS-CBN, 1999–2000; RPN)
  - Kapag Nasa Katwiran, Ipaglaban Mo! (2012–2013; GMA News TV)
  - Ipaglaban Mo! (2014–2020; ABS-CBN, 2017–2020; DZMM TeleRadyo, 2018–2022, 2024; Jeepney TV, 2020–2021; TeleRadyo, 2020–2024; Kapamilya Channel, 2021–2023, 2024; A2Z, 2024; All TV)
- Kapag Nahati ang Puso (2018; GMA)
- Karelasyon (2015–2017; GMA)
- Kasalanan Bang Ibigin Ka? (2012; GMA)
- Kasangga (1999–2002; GMA)
- Katipunan (2013; GMA)
- Kroko: Takas sa Zoo (2010; IBC)
- Krusada Kontra Krimen (2005–2007; NBN/RPN/IBC)
  - Krusada Kontra Korupsyon (2007–2008; NBN/RPN/IBC)
- Langit sa Piling Mo (2010; GMA)
- Las Hermanas (2021–2022; GMA)
- Legacy (2012; GMA)
- Legal Wives (2021; GMA/GTV/Heart of Asia)
- Legally Blind (2017; GMA)
- Let the Love Begin (2015; GMA)
- Little Nanay (2015–2016; GMA)
- Little Princess (2022; GMA)
- Little Star (2010–2011; GMA)
- Lorenzo's Time (2012; ABS-CBN)
- Love & Lies (2013; GMA)
- Love Before Sunrise (2023; GMA/GTV/I Heart Movies/Pinoy Hits/Viu)
- Love Bites (2022–2023; ABS-CBN Entertainment)
- Love Bug (2010; GMA)
- Love Notes (1993–1998; ABC)
- Love of My Life (2020–2021; GMA)
- Love Spell (2006–2008; ABS-CBN)
- Love Thy Woman (2020; ABS-CBN/Kapamilya Channel)
- Love to Love (2003–2006; GMA)
- Love You Stranger (2022; GMA/GTV)
- Lovers & Liars (2023–2024; GMA/GTV/Pinoy Hits)
- Lovers in Paris (2009; ABS-CBN)
- Lumayo Ka Man (1993–1996; New Vision 9/RPN)
- Lupin (2007; GMA)
- Luv Is (2023; GMA/GTV/I Heart Movies/Pinoy Hits)
- Maalaala Mo Kaya (1991–2020; ABS-CBN, 2020–2022, 2025–present; Kapamilya Channel/A2Z, 2025–present; All TV, 2026–present; TV5)
  - MMK Klasik (2010–2020; DZMM TeleRadyo)
  - Maalaala Mo Kaya sa DZMM (2007–2010, 2025–present; DZMM TeleRadyo, 2025–present; PRTV Prime Media)
- Magandang Dilag (2023; GMA/Pinoy Hits)
- Magdalena: Anghel sa Putikan (2012–2013; GMA)
- Maghihintay Pa Rin (2013; GMA)
- Maging Sino Ka Man (2023; GMA/GTV/I Heart Movies/Pinoy Hits)
- Magkano ang Iyong Dangal? (2010; ABS-CBN)
- Magkaribal (2010; ABS-CBN)
- Magpahanggang Wakas (2016–2017; ABS-CBN)
- Magpakailanman (2002–2007, 2012–present; GMA, 2023–2024; Pinoy Hits, 2024; GTV)
- Maid in Heaven (2004; ABS-CBN)
- Makapiling Kang Muli (2012; GMA)
- Make It with You (2020; ABS-CBN)
- Makiling (2024; GMA/Pinoy Hits)
- Makita Ka Lang Muli (2006–2007; GMA)
- Makulay ang Daigdig ni Nora (1976–1978; RPN)
- Malayo Pa ang Umaga (1993–1995; New Vision 9/RPN)
- Mano Po Legacy (2022–2023; GMA/GTV)
  - Mano Po Legacy: The Family Fortune (2022; GMA/GTV)
  - Mano Po Legacy: Her Big Boss (2022; GMA/GTV)
  - Mano Po Legacy: The Flower Sisters (2022–2023; GMA/GTV)
- Margarita (2007; ABS-CBN)
- Maria Mercedes (2013–2014; ABS-CBN)
- Maria Morena (1980; BBC/City2)
- Maricel Regal Drama Special (1987–1989; ABS-CBN)
- Marry Me, Marry You (2021–2022; Kapamilya Channel/A2Z/TV5/Jeepney TV)
- May Isang Pangarap (2013; ABS-CBN)
- May Puso ang Batas (2003–2004; RPN)
- Maynila (1998–2020; GMA)
- Mga Gintong Aral ng El Shaddai (1994–1997; IBC)
- Mga Nagbabagang Bulaklak (2011; TV5)
- Minsan pa Nating Hagkan ang Nakaraan (2023; TV5/Sari-Sari Channel)
- Miranova (1994–1995; New Vision 9/RPN)
- Misibis Bay (2013; TV5)
- Misis Piggy (2022; iWantTFC, 2023; Kapamilya Channel/A2Z)
- Mistaken Identity (2011; GMA)
- Mommy Guard (2026–present; TV5/All TV/A2Z/Kapamilya Channel)
- Moon of Desire (2014; ABS-CBN)
- More Than Words (2014–2015; GMA)
- Mother Studio Presents (1987–1996; GMA)
- Muli (2007; GMA)
- Muling Buksan ang Puso (2013; ABS-CBN)
- My BFF (2014; GMA)
- My Daddy Dearest (2012; GMA)
- My Destiny (2014; GMA)
- My Driver Sweet Lover (2010–2011; TV5)
- My Fair Lady (2015; TV5)
- My Faithful Husband (2015; GMA)
- My Fantastic Pag-ibig (2021; GMA News TV/GTV)
- My Father's Wife (2025; GMA)
- My Girl (2008; ABS-CBN)
- My Guardian Abby (2005–2006; QTV)
- My Guitar Princess (2018; GMA)
- My Husband's Lover (2013; GMA)
- My Ilonggo Girl (2025; GMA/GTV)
- My Lover, My Wife (2011; GMA)
- My Mother's Secret (2015; GMA)
- My Sunset Girl (2021; iWantTFC)
- Nagbabagang Luha (2021; GMA)
- Nagmamahal, Kapamilya (2006–2007; ABS-CBN)
- Nagsimula sa Puso (2009–2010; ABS-CBN)
- Nakarehas na Puso (2022–2023; GMA)
- Naku, Boss Ko! (2016; GMA)
- Nandito Ako (2012; TV5)
- Nasaan Ka, Elisa? (2011–2012; ABS-CBN)
- Nasaan Ka Nang Kailangan Kita (2015; ABS-CBN)
- Never Say Die (2026; GMA/GTV)
- Never Say Goodbye (2013; TV5)
- Niño (2014; GMA)
- Nita Negrita (2011; GMA)
- Noel (2006; QTV)
- Noli Me Tangere (2013–2014; IBC)
- Now and Forever (2005–2006; GMA)
  - Mukha (2005; GMA)
  - Ganti (2005; GMA)
  - Agos (2005–2006; GMA)
  - Tinig (2006; GMA)
  - Duyan (2006; GMA)
  - Linlang (2006; GMA)
  - Dangal (2006; GMA)
- Obra (2008; GMA)
- Obsession (2013–2014; TV5)
- Oh, My Mama! (2016; GMA)
- Once Upon a Kiss (2015; GMA)
- One of the Baes (2019–2020; GMA)
- One True Love (2012; GMA)
- Only You (2009; ABS-CBN)
- Owe My Love (2021; GMA)
- Paano ang Pangako? (2021; TV5)
  - Paano ang Pasko? (2020–2021; TV5)
- Padyak Princess (2024; TV5)
- Paglipas ng Panahon (1983–1985; RPN)
- Pahiram ng Isang Ina (2011; GMA)
- Pahiram ng Sandali (2012–2013; GMA)
- Palos (2008; ABS-CBN)
- Pamilya Roces (2018–2019; GMA)
- Pangarap na Bituin (2007; ABS-CBN)
- Para sa Isa't Isa (2025–2026; TV5)
- Paraiso Ko'y Ikaw (2014; GMA)
- Parang Kayo Pero Hindi (2023; GTV)
- Pinakamamahal (2006; GMA)
- Pintados (1999–2000; GMA)
- Pinulot Ka Lang sa Lupa (2017; GMA)
- Pira-pirasong Pangarap (1997–2003; GMA)
- Poor Señorita (2016; GMA)
- Posh (2006; QTV)
- Positive (2013–2014; TV5)
- Precious Hearts Romances Presents (2009–2019)
  - Bud Brothers (2009; ABS-CBN)
  - Ang Lalaking Nagmahal Sa Akin (2009; ABS-CBN)
  - Somewhere in My Heart (2009; ABS-CBN)
  - My Cheating Heart (2009–2010; ABS-CBN)
  - Love Is Only in the Movies (2010; ABS-CBN)
  - The Substitute Bride (2010; ABS-CBN)
  - You're Mine, Only Mine (2010; ABS-CBN)
  - Lumang Piso Para sa Puso (2010; ABS-CBN)
  - Love Me Again (2010; ABS-CBN)
  - Impostor (2010; ABS-CBN)
  - Midnight Phantom (2010; ABS-CBN)
  - Kristine (2010–2011; ABS-CBN)
  - Alyna (2010–2011; ABS-CBN)
  - Mana Po (2011; ABS-CBN)
  - Lumayo Ka Man sa Akin (2012; ABS-CBN)
  - Hiyas (2012; ABS-CBN)
  - Pintada (2012; ABS-CBN)
  - Paraiso (2012–2013; ABS-CBN)
  - Araw Gabi (2018; ABS-CBN)
  - Los Bastardos (2018–2019; ABS-CBN)
- Princess Charming (2007; GMA)
- Prinsesa ng Buhay Ko (2014–2015; GMA)
- Project Destination (2020; GMA News TV)
- P. S. I Love You (2011–2012; TV5)
- Q Drama Classics (2010–2011; Q)
- QTV Gems (2005–2006; QTV)
- Radyo Istorya (2026–present; Aliw 23/DWIZ News TV)
- Raising Mamay (2022; GMA)
- Real Confessions (2011–2012; TV5)
- Regal Drama Hour (1988–1994; IBC)
- Regal Drama Presents (1986–1989; ABS-CBN/IBC)
- Regal Juvenile (1989–1990; IBC)
- Regal Romance (1988–1990; GMA)
- Regal Studio Presents (2021–present; GMA, 2023; GTV, 2023; Pinoy Hits)
- Regal Theater (1988–1989; IBC)
- Return to Paradise (2022; GMA)
- Rhodora X (2014; GMA)
- Rod Santiago's The Sisters (2011; TV5)
- Roja (2025–2026; Kapamilya Channel/A2Z/TV5/Jeepney TV/Netflix/iWant, 2026; All TV)
- Royal Blood (2023; GMA/GTV/I Heart Movies/Pinoy Hits)
- Sa Ngalan ng Ina (2011; TV5)
- Sa Puso ni Dok (2014; GMA)
- Sabel (2010–2011; ABS-CBN)
- Sana Bukas pa ang Kahapon (2014; ABS-CBN)
- Sana Maulit Muli (2007; ABS-CBN)
- Sana Ngayong Pasko (2009–2010; GMA)
- Sandara's Romance (2004; ABS-CBN)
- Saving Grace (2024–2025; Amazon Prime Video, 2025; Kapamilya Channel/A2Z/TV5/Jeepney TV)
- Saying Goodbye (2021–2022; iQiyi, 2023; Kapamilya Channel/A2Z)
- Seasons of Love (2014; GMA)
- Second Chances (2015; GMA)
- Seiko TV Presents (1987–1989; RPN, 1989–1990; ABS-CBN, 1990–1991; Islands TV 13)
- Sherlock Jr. (2018; GMA)
- Shining Inheritance (2024–2025; GMA, 2024; Pinoy Hits)
- Simply Snooky (1986–1988; RPN)
- Since I Found You (2018; ABS-CBN)
- Sine Novela (2007–2010; GMA)
  - Sinasamba Kita (2007; GMA)
  - Pati Ba Pintig ng Puso (2007; GMA)
  - Kung Mahawi Man ang Ulap (2007; GMA)
  - Pasan Ko ang Daigdig (2007–2008; GMA)
  - My Only Love (2007–2008; GMA)
  - Maging Akin Ka Lamang (2008; GMA)
  - Kaputol ng Isang Awit (2008; GMA)
  - Magdusa Ka (2008; GMA)
  - Gaano Kadalas ang Minsan (2008; GMA)
  - Una Kang Naging Akin (2008; GMA)
  - Saan Darating ang Umaga? (2008–2009; GMA)
  - Paano Ba ang Mangarap? (2009; GMA)
  - Dapat Ka Bang Mahalin? (2009; GMA)
  - Ngayon at Kailanman (2009; GMA)
  - Kung Aagawin Mo ang Lahat sa Akin (2009; GMA)
  - Kaya Kong Abutin ang Langit (2009–2010; GMA)
  - Tinik sa Dibdib (2009–2010; GMA)
  - Ina, Kasusuklaman Ba Kita? (2010; GMA)
  - Gumapang Ka sa Lusak (2010; GMA)
  - Basahang Ginto (2010; GMA)
  - Trudis Liit (2010; GMA)
- Sineserye Presents (2007–2009; ABS-CBN)
  - Palimos ng Pag-ibig (2007; ABS-CBN)
  - Hiram na Mukha (2007; ABS-CBN)
  - May Minamahal (2007; ABS-CBN)
  - Natutulog Ba ang Diyos? (2007; ABS-CBN)
  - Patayin sa Sindak si Barbara (2008; ABS-CBN)
  - Maligno (2008; ABS-CBN)
  - Florinda (2009; ABS-CBN)
- Sinner or Saint (2011; GMA)
- Sino ang Maysala?: Mea Culpa (2019; ABS-CBN)
- Sinungaling Mong Puso (2016; GMA)
- Sisid (2011; GMA)
- Slay (2025; GMA/GTV/Viu)
- Sleepless: The Series (2021; TV5)
- Someone, Someday (2026–present; Kapamilya Channel/A2Z/All TV/TV5/Netflix/iWant)
- Someone to Watch Over Me (2016–2017; GMA)
- SRO Cinemaserye (2009–2010; GMA)
- Stairway to Heaven (2009; GMA)
- Star Drama Presents (1993–2001; ABS-CBN)
- Star Magic Presents (2006–2008; ABS-CBN)
- Start-Up (2022; GMA/GTV)
- Stay-In Love (2020–2021; TV5)
- Stories for the Soul (2017–2019; GMA)
- Stories from the Heart (2021–2022; GMA)
- Story of My Life (2019–2020; iWant, 2023; Kapamilya Channel/A2Z)
- Strawberry Lane (2014–2015; GMA)
- Suntok sa Buwan (2022; TV5)
- Tadhana (2017–present; GMA, 2023–2024; Pinoy Hits)
- Talambuhay (1981–1985; RPN)
- Tanging Yaman: The Series (2002–2003; ABS-CBN)
  - Tanging Yaman (2010; ABS-CBN)
- Tanglaw ng Buhay (1990–1994; New Vision 9)
- Teenage Diary (1986–1988; RPN)
- That's My Amboy (2016; GMA)
- The Alibi (2025; Amazon Prime Video, 2026; Kapamilya Channel/A2Z/All TV/Jeepney TV/iWant)
- The Better Woman (2019; GMA)
- The Borrowed Wife (2014; GMA)
- The Brilliant Life (2022–2023; TV5)
- The Cure (2018; GMA)
- The Fake Life (2022; GMA)
- The Good Daughter (2012; GMA)
- The Legal Wife (2014; ABS-CBN)
- The Loyalty Game (2026; Amazon Prime Video, 2026–present; Kapamilya Channel/A2Z/All TV/TV5/iWant)
- The Maricel Drama Special (1989–1997; ABS-CBN)
- The Millionaire's Wife (2016; GMA)
- The Missing Husband (2023; GMA/Pinoy Hits)
- The One That Got Away (2018; GMA)
- The Rich Man's Daughter (2015; GMA)
- The Secrets of Hotel 88 (2026; GMA/GTV/IWant)
- The Seed of Love (2023; GMA/Pinoy Hits)
- The Story of Us (2016; ABS-CBN)
- The Wedding (2009; ABS-CBN)
- The World Between Us (2021–2022; GMA/GTV/Heart of Asia)
- Time of My Life (2011; GMA)
- Titser (2013; GMA News TV)
- To Have & to Hold (2021; GMA/GTV/Heart of Asia)
- TODA One I Love (2019; GMA)
- Together Forever (2012; GMA)
- Totoy Bato (2009; GMA)
  - Totoy Bato (2025–2026; TV5/One PH/Sari-Sari Channel/Kapatid Channel)
- Trenderas (2014; TV5)
- Ula, Ang Batang Gubat (1990–1991; Islands TV 13)
- Ulirat sa Pagkahambing (2026–present; AllRadio TV)
- Uncoupling (2021–2022; Kapamilya Channel)
- Underage (2023; GMA/Pinoy Hits)
- Undercover (2013; TV5)
- Unica Hija (2022–2023; GMA, 2023; Pinoy Hits)
- Valiente (1992–1995; ABS-CBN, 1995–1997; GMA)
  - Valiente (2012; TV5)
- Verdadero (1986–1988; RPN)
- Viva Drama Specials (1990–1992; PTV)
- Viva Love Stories (1988–1990; IBC)
- Viva Spotlight (1989–1998; GMA)
- Wagas (2013–2019; GMA News TV, 2019; GMA)
- Wakasan (1986–1988; IBC)
- Walang Hanggan (2003–2004; GMA)
  - Walang Hanggan (2012; ABS-CBN)
- Walang Iwanan (2015; ABS-CBN)
- Walang Kapalit (2007; ABS-CBN)
- We Will Survive (2016; ABS-CBN)
- What We Could Be (2022; GMA/GTV)
- What's Wrong with Secretary Kim (2024; Kapamilya Channel/A2Z/TV5)
- Widows' Web (2022; GMA/GTV)
- Wish I May (2016; GMA)
- Wish Ko Lang! (2002–2026; GMA, 2023–2024; Pinoy Hits)
- With a Smile (2013; GMA)
- Yesterday's Bride (2012–2013; GMA)
- Your Song (2006–2011; ABS-CBN)
- You're My Favorite Song (2026; GMA)
- You're My Home (2015–2016; ABS-CBN)
- Zorro (2009; GMA)

== Fantasy series ==
- Adarna (2013–2014; GMA)
- Agimat: Ang Mga Alamat ni Ramon Revilla (2009–2011; ABS-CBN)
  - Tiagong Akyat (2009; ABS-CBN)
  - Pepeng Agimat (2009–2010; ABS-CBN)
  - Tonyong Bayawak (2010; ABS-CBN)
  - Elias Paniki (2010; ABS-CBN)
  - Bianong Bulag (2011; ABS-CBN)
  - Kapitan Inggo (2011; ABS-CBN)
- Agimat ng Agila (2021–2022; GMA)
- Agua Bendita (2010; ABS-CBN)
- Alakdana (2011; GMA)
- Alice Bungisngis and Her Wonder Walis (2012; GMA)
- All of Me (2015- 2016; ABS-CBN)
- Ang Lihim ni Annasandra (2014–2015; GMA)
- Aryana (2012–2013; ABS-CBN)
- Aso ni San Roque (2012–2013; GMA)
- Atlantika (2006–2007; GMA)
- Bagani (2018; ABS-CBN)
- Bangis (2011; TV5)
- Bantatay (2010–2011; GMA)
- Batang X: The Next Generation (2008; TV5)
- Captain Barbell (2006–2007; GMA)
  - Captain Barbell (2011; GMA)
- Cassandra: Warrior Angel (2013; TV5)
- Computer Man (1990–1991; Islands TV 13)
- Daldalita (2011–2012; GMA)
- Dangwa (2015–2016; GMA)
- Darna at Ang Impakta (1965; ABC)
  - Darna (1977; RPN)
  - Darna (2005; GMA)
  - Darna (2009–2010; GMA)
  - Darna (2022–2023; A2Z/Cine Mo!/Kapamilya Channel/TV5)
- Dwarfina (2011; GMA)
- Dyesebel (2008; GMA)
  - Dyesebel (2014; ABS-CBN)
- Dyosa (2008–2009; ABS-CBN)
- E-Boy (2012; ABS-CBN)
- Encantadia (2005; GMA)
  - Etheria: Ang Ikalimang Kaharian ng Encantadia (2005–2006; GMA)
  - Encantadia: Pag-ibig Hanggang Wakas (2006; GMA)
  - Encantadia (2016–2017; GMA)
  - Encantadia Chronicles: Sang'gre (2025–2026; GMA/GTV)
- Enchanted Garden (2012–2013; TV5)
- False Positive (2022; GMA/GTV)
- Fantastic Man (2007; GMA)
- Fantastikids (2006; GMA)
- Felina: Prinsesa ng mga Pusa (2012; TV5)
- Forever (2013; GMA)
- Gagambino (2008–2009; GMA)
- Galema: Anak ni Zuma (2013–2014; ABS-CBN)
- Grazilda (2010–2011; GMA)
- Home Sweet Home (2013; GMA)
- Ilumina (2010; GMA)
- Inday Bote (2015; ABS-CBN)
- Indio (2013; GMA)
- Innamorata (2014; GMA)
- Jillian: Namamasko Po (2010–2011; GMA)
- Joaquin Bordado (2008; GMA)
- Juan dela Cruz (2013; ABS-CBN)
  - My Little Juan (2013; ABS-CBN)
- Kakambal ni Eliana (2013; GMA)
- Kamandag (2007–2008; GMA)
- Kambal sa Uma (2009; ABS-CBN)
- Kambal Sirena (2014; GMA)
- Kampanerang Kuba (2005; ABS-CBN)
- Kapitan Awesome (2012–2013; TV5)
- Kara Mia (2019; GMA)
- Kidlat (2013; TV5)
- Kokak (2011–2012; GMA)
- Kokey (2007; ABS-CBN)
  - Kokey at Ako (2010; ABS-CBN)
- Komiks (2006–2009; ABS-CBN)
  - Da Adventures of Pedro Penduko (2006–2007; ABS-CBN)
  - Pedro Penduko at ang Mga Engkantao (2007; ABS-CBN)
  - Komiks Presents: Kapitan Boom (2008; ABS-CBN)
  - Komiks Presents: Varga (2008; ABS-CBN)
  - Komiks Presents: Tiny Tony (2008; ABS-CBN)
  - Komiks Presents: Dragonna (2008–2009; ABS-CBN)
  - Komiks Presents: Flash Bomba (2009; ABS-CBN)
  - Nasaan Ka Maruja? (2009; ABS-CBN)
- Krystala (2004–2005; ABS-CBN)
- Kung Fu Kids (2008; ABS-CBN)
- LaLola (2008–2009; GMA)
- Lastikman (2007–2008; ABS-CBN)
- Leya, ang Pinakamagandang Babae sa Ilalim ng Lupa (2004–2005; GMA)
- Little Champ (2013; ABS-CBN)
- Lobo (2008; ABS-CBN)
  - Imortal (2010–2011; ABS-CBN)
  - La Luna Sangre (2017–2018; ABS-CBN)
- Lolong (2022; GMA/GTV)
  - Lolong: Bayani ng Bayan (2025; GMA/GTV)
- Love. Die. Repeat. (2024; GMA/GTV/Pinoy Hits)
- Love in 40 Days (2022; Kapamilya Channel/A2Z/TV5/Jeepney TV)
- Luna Mystika (2008–2009; GMA)
  - Luna Blanca (2012; GMA)
- Machete (2011; GMA)
- Magic Kamison (1990–1992; Islands TV 13, 2007; GMA)
- Magic Palayok (2011; GMA)
- Magkaibang Mundo (2016; GMA)
- Majika (2006; GMA)
- Maria Clara at Ibarra (2022–2023; GMA/GTV, 2023; Pinoy Hits)
- Marina (2004; ABS-CBN)
- Marinara (2004; GMA)
- Mga Lihim ni Urduja (2023; GMA/GTV/I Heart Movies/Pinoy Hits)
- Mga Mata ni Angelita (2007; GMA)
- Mirabella (2014; ABS-CBN)
- Momay (2010; ABS-CBN)
- Mulawin (2004–2005; GMA)
  - Iglot (2011; GMA)
  - Mulawin vs. Ravena (2017; GMA)
- Mutya (2011; ABS-CBN)
- My Beloved (2012; GMA)
- My Dear Heart (2017; ABS-CBN)
- My Guardian Alien (2024; GMA/GTV/Pinoy Hits)
- My Love from the Star (2017; GMA)
- My Super D (2016; ABS-CBN)
- Noah (2010–2011; ABS-CBN)
- Once Again (2016; GMA)
- One Day Isang Araw (2013; GMA)
- Ora Engkantada (1986–1990; IBC, 1996–1998; RPN)
- Panday (2005–2006; ABS-CBN)
  - Panday Kids (2010; GMA)
  - Ang Panday (2016; TV5)
- Paroa: Ang Kuwento ni Mariposa (2012–2013; GMA)
- Pidol's Wonderland (2010–2013; TV5)
- Pilyang Kerubin (2010; GMA)
- Pinoy Thriller (IBC)
- Princess Sarah (2007; ABS-CBN)
- Pure Love (2014; ABS-CBN)
- Puto (2021; TV5/Sari-Sari Channel)
- Pyra: Babaeng Apoy (2013; GMA)
- Raya Sirena (2022; GMA)
- Rounin (2007; ABS-CBN)
- Sahaya (2019; GMA)
- Sirkus (2018; GMA)
- Spirits (2004–2005; ABS-CBN)
  - Spirits: Reawaken (2018–2019; iWant)
- Starla (2019–2020; ABS-CBN)
- Stolen Life (2023–2024; GMA/Pinoy Hits)
- Sugo (2005–2006; GMA)
- Super Inggo (2006–2007; ABS-CBN)
  - Super Inggo 1.5: Ang Bagong Bangis (2007; ABS-CBN)
- Super Ma'am (2017–2018; GMA)
- Super Twins (2007; GMA)
- Tasya Fantasya (2008; GMA)
  - Tasya Fantasya (2016; TV5)
- The Last Prince (2010; GMA)
- The Lost Recipe (2021; GMA News TV/GTV/Heart of Asia)
- The Write One (2023; GMA/GTV/I Heart Movies/Pinoy Hits/Viu)
- Unforgettable (2013; GMA)
- Victor Magtanggol (2018; GMA)
- Voltes V: Legacy (2023; GMA/GTV/I Heart Movies/Pinoy Hits)
- Wako Wako (2012; ABS-CBN)
- Zaido: Pulis Pangkalawakan (2007–2008; GMA)

== Game shows ==
- 1 vs. 100 (2007–2008; ABS-CBN)
- 1000 Heartbeats: Pintig Pinoy (2021; TV5)
- ABS-CBN & Unilever: Pamilyong Papremyo sa Pamilya (1999; ABS-CBN)
- Alas Suerte (2000–2001; IBC)
- All Star K! (2002–2009; GMA)
- All Star Videoke (2017–2018; GMA)
- Ang Say Mo... Mahalaga! (1987–1988; GMA)
- Asar Talo Lahat Panalo! (2010; GMA)
- Astro Quiz Show (BBC)
- B na B: Baliw na Baliw (1994–1997; ABC)
- Baikingu (2008–2010; TV5)
- BandaOke! Rock 'N Roll to Millions (2009–2010; GMA)
- Barangay Singko Panalo (2024; TV5)
- Barangay Utakan (2015–2016; TV5)
- Battle of the Brains (1992–2000; New Vision 9/RPN, 2000–2001; PTV)
- Bawal Na Game Show (2020–2021; TV5)
- Bet on Your Baby (2013–2014, 2014–2015, 2017; ABS-CBN)
- Big Show Jackpot (2011; TV5)
- Bigayan Na with Boss Toyo!! (2024–2025, D8TV)
- BIHASA: Biblia Hamon Sa 'Yo (2007–2008; UNTV)
- Bilyonaryo Quiz B (2025; Bilyonaryo News Channel)
- Blind Item (2005–2006; ABC)
- Bossing & Ai (2017–2018; GMA)
- Camp Tiger (2010; TV5)
- Campus Challenge (2011–2013; UNTV)
- Celebrity Bluff (2012–2016, 2017–2018; GMA)
- Celebrity Cook-Off (2010; TV5)
- Celebrity Playtime (2015–2016; ABS-CBN)
- Da Big Show (2008; GMA)
- Digital LG Quiz (1999–2003; GMA)
  - Digital LG Challenge (2003–2004; GMA)
- Diz Iz It (2010; GMA)
- Double W (2010; TV5)
- Easy Money: Ang Cash ng Bayan (2000–2001; ABC)
- Emojination (2023–2024, 2025; TV5/BuKo Channel)
- Family Feud (2001–2002; ABC, 2008–2010, 2011, 2022–present; GMA, 2016–2017; ABS-CBN)
- Family Kuarta o Kahon (1962–1972; ABS-CBN, 1973–1984; BBC, 1984–2000; RPN/New Vision 9)
- Fastbreak (1999–2000; IBC)
- Fill in the Bank (2020–2021; TV5)
- Game Channel (2003–2004; IBC)
- Game Channel Extreme (2004–2005; ABC)
- Game Na Game Na! (1994–1996; ABS-CBN)
- Game ng Bayan (2016; ABS-CBN)
- Game of the Gens (2021; GTV)
- Games Uplate Live (2006–2009; ABS-CBN)
- Gameworld (1976–1977; IBC)
- Geym Na Geym (1981–1982; IBC)
- Global Family Series (2003–2005; IBC)
- GoBingo (1996–1999, 2008; GMA)
- Go for It! (1998–1999; ABC)
- Golympics (1999; GMA)
- GuesSing GuesSong (2024–2025; True FM TV/True TV)
- Hole in the Wall (2009–2010; GMA)
- House or Not (2010–2011; TV5)
- I Can See Your Voice (2017–2020; ABS-CBN, 2020–2024; Kapamilya Channel/A2Z, 2023–2024; TV5)
- Iba Na ang Matalino: The Nutroplex Brain Challenge (2007; QTV)
- imGAME (2002–2003; NBN)
- Instant Dyakpat (1998; ABC)
- Islands Gamemasters (1990–1992; Islands TV 13)
- Ito na Kami (1974–1976; GMA)
- Jeepney Jackpot: Pera o Para! (2013; TV5)
- Kabarkada, Break the Bank (2007; Studio 23)
- Kakasa Ka Ba Sa Grade 5? (2007–2009; GMA)
- Kapamilya, Deal or No Deal (2006–2009, 2012–2013, 2015–2016; ABS-CBN, 2026–present; Kapamilya Channel/A2Z/All TV/TV5)
- Kapamilya, Mas Winner Ka! (2007–2018; ABS-CBN Bacolod, ABS-CBN Cebu, ABS-CBN Davao)
- Karinderya Wars (2013; TV5)
- Kiddie Pow! (BBC)
- Killer Karaoke: Pinoy Naman (2013–2014; TV5)
- Kol TV (2007–2008; RPN)
- Korek Na Korek Ka Diyan! (2001; GMA)
- Laugh or Lose (2010–2011; TV5)
- Let's Ask Pilipinas (2013–2014; TV5)
- Love Bytes (1995–1997; ABC)
- Lucky 13 (1977–1980; IBC)
- Lucky Numbers (2011; TV5)
- Manny Many Prizes (2011–2012; GMA)
- Match TV (2002–2003; RPN)
- Minute to Win It (2013–2014, 2016–2017, 2019; ABS-CBN)
- Mukhang Perya (2023; PIE Channel)
- Mysmatch (2008; TV5)
- National Super Quiz Bee (1996–2001; IBC, 2005–2013; Studio 23)
- Natiyempuhan Mo! (2007)
- Now Na! (2006–2007; QTV)
- Online Bingo Filipino (1999–2001; PTV)
- Panahon Ko 'to!: Ang Game Show ng Buhay Ko (2010; ABS-CBN)
- PCSO Lottery Draw (2016–2024; PTV, 2024–present; IBC/D8TV/DWAN TV)
- Philippine Lottery Draw (2013–2016; PTV)
- Philippine Lotto Draw (1995–2003, 2005–2013; PTV/NBN)
- Picture! Picture! (2013–2014; GMA)
- PIEnalo: Pinoy Games (2022–2023; PIE Channel)
- Pilipinas, Game KNB? (2004–2009; ABS-CBN, 2020–2021; Jeepney TV)
  - Game Ka Na Ba? (2001–2002; ABS-CBN)
  - Million Million Na, Game KNB? (2002–2003; ABS-CBN)
  - Next Level Na, Game KNB? (2003–2004; ABS-CBN)
  - Pasko Na!, Game KNB? (2005–2008; ABS-CBN)
- Pinoy Bingo Night (2009; ABS-CBN)
- Puso o Pera (2004; ABC)
- Quiet Please!: Bawal ang Maingay (2014–2015; TV5)
- Quizmosa (2024–2025; TV5)
- R.U. Kidding Me (2011; TV5)
- Rainbow Rumble (2024–2026; Kapamilya Channel/A2Z, 2024–2025; TV5, 2025–2026; All TV)
- Ready, Get Set, Go! (1992–1997; ABS-CBN)
- Rolling In It Philippines (2021–2022; TV5)
- Sing Galing! (1998–2005; ABC, 2021–2022, 2025–2026; TV5, 2021; Colours, 2025–2026; BuKo Channel/Sari-Sari Channel)
- Slingo (2007; ABC)
- Sorpresaya (2018; Cine Mo!)
- Spin-A-Win (1975–1985; RPN)
- Spingo (2023; TV5)
- Super Games (1991; IBC, 1996–1997; GMA)
- Swerteng-Swerte sa Siyete: Press It, Win It! (2010; GMA)
  - Swerteng-Swerte sa Siyete: Spin It, Win It! (2010; GMA)
  - Swerteng-Swerte sa Siyete: Win Mo Kapuso! (2011; GMA)
- Takeshi's Castle (1990–1991; Islands TV 13, 2006–2010; QTV/Q/GMA)
- Tara Game, Agad Agad! (2021–2022; Net 25)
- Text 2 Win (2008; ABC)
- The Million Peso Money Drop (2012–2013; TV5)
- The People Have Spoken (2026–present; GMA)
- The Price Is Right (2001–2003; ABC, 2011; ABS-CBN)
- The Singing Bee (2008–2010, 2013–2015; ABS-CBN)
- The Wall Philippines (2021; TV5, 2022; GMA)
- The Weakest Link (2001–2002; IBC)
- Toink! Sino ang Tama? (2012; TV5)
- Tok! Tok! Tok! Isang Milyon Pasok (2007–2008; GMA)
- TV Powww (BBC)
- Twist and Shout (2010; ABS-CBN)
- Watchawin (2023; PIE Channel)
- Whammy! Push Your Luck (2007–2008; GMA)
- Wheel of Fortune (2001–2002; ABC, 2008; ABS-CBN)
- Who Wants to Be a Millionaire? (2000–2002; IBC, 2009–2015; TV5)
- Win Win Win (2007–2008; ABC)
- You and Me Against the World (2008–2009; TV5)

== Home shopping ==
- E-Novation TV (2026–present; SolarFlix/Solar Sports)
- EZ Shop (2004–2020, 2023; IBC, 2004–2007; RPN, 2004–2015, 2018–2019; NBN/PTV, 2005–2008; ABC, 2016–2020; TV5, 2016–2019; AksyonTV, 2017; GMA, 2019, 2020–2023; Heart of Asia, 2020–2021; One Sports, 2022–2023; RJ DigiTV, 2022; SolarFlix/All TV, 2023–2024; Pinoy Hits)
  - EZ Buy (2015–2016; IBC)
- Home Shopping Network (2003–2014; RPN/C/S/Solar TV/Talk TV/Solar News Channel/9TV, 2004–2007; SBN, 2004–2011, 2014–2015; IBC, 2005–2015; Jack TV, 2007–2015; 2nd Avenue)
- Lucida DS: United Shelter Health Show (2007–2008; ABC, 2008–2009; IBC)
- Metro TV Shopping (1999–2002; GMA, 1999–2004; PTV/NBN/IBC, 2000–2005; ABC)
- New Life TV Shopping (2004–2006; NBN)
- O Shopping (2013–2020; ABS-CBN, 2013–2014; Studio 23, 2016; PTV, 2018–2020; S+A, 2020; Jeepney TV/Kapamilya Channel)
- Proactiv Solution (2005–2008; ABC, 2007–2009; NBN)
- Quantum Info (2003; IBC)
- Quantum Showcase (2001–2005; ABC)
- Shop Japan (2014–2018; TV5/AksyonTV, 2015–2017; PTV, 2016; GMA News TV)
- Shop TV (2015–2020; ETC, 2015–2018; 2nd Avenue, 2015–2019; GMA News TV, 2015–2020; Jack TV, 2015–2023; Solar Sports, 2016, 2017–2018; AksyonTV, 2019; TV5, 2022–2023; SolarFlix)
- Shopping All the Way! (2022–2025; Net 25)
- Smart TV Shopping (1998–2002; IBC)
- Tagamend (1999–2007; RPN, 2008–2018; IBC)
- The Quantum Channel (1996–2005; RPN, 1999–2003; IBC)
- TV Shop Philippines (2015–2020; PTV, 2015–2020, 2023; IBC, 2015–2023; BEAM TV, 2018–2023; RJDigiTV)
- Value Vision (1994–1998; ABC, 1994–1996; ABS-CBN, 1996–2005; IBC, 1996–2010; PTV/NBN, 1998–2005; Studio 23, 1998–2007; RPN/SBN/RJTV)
- Venta5 Interactive TV Shopping (2006–2008; ABC)
- Winner TV Shopping (2002–2008; ABC, 2002–2007; SBN/RJTV, 2005–2007; RPN, 2005–2014; NBN/PTV)

== Horror ==
- !Oka Tokat (1997–2002; ABS-CBN)
- Doors (2023; GTV)
- Elemento (2014; GMA)
- E.S.P. (2008; GMA)
- Guni-Guni (1996; ABC)
- Hanggang sa Dulo ng Buhay Ko (2019; GMA)
- Haplos (2017–2018; GMA)
- Hiwaga ng Kambat (2019; ABS-CBN)
- Hiwaga sa Bahay na Bato (1963–1964; ABS-CBN)
- Hooo U? (2006; GMA)
- Jasmine (2014; TV5)
- Kagat ng Dilim (2000–2002; IBC, 2020–2021; TV5)
- Kakabakaba (2000–2003; GMA)
  - Kakabakaba Adventures (2003–2004; GMA)
  - Kakabaka-Boo? (2005–2006; GMA)
- Kambal, Karibal (2017–2018; GMA)
- La Vendetta (2007–2008; GMA)
- Lihim ng Gabi (GMA)
- Mga Kuwento ng Dilim (2023; PIE Channel)
- Midnight DJ (2008–2011; TV5)
- Moomoo & Me (2009–2010; TV5)
- Mysteries 2000 (ABC)
- Nginiiig (2004–2006; ABS-CBN)
- Oka Tokat (2012; ABS-CBN)
- #ParangNormal Activity (2015–2016; TV5)
- Parasite Island (2019; ABS-CBN)
- Pinoy Thriller (1986–1989; IBC)
- Regal Shocker (1985–1988; GMA, 1988–1991; IBC/Islands TV 13, 2011–2012; TV5)
- Shake, Rattle & Roll: Sabado Specials (2014, 2017–2018; ABS-CBN)
- Spooky Nights (2011–2012; GMA)
- The Haunted (2019–2020; ABS-CBN)
- The Killer Bride (2019–2020; ABS-CBN)
- Third Eye (2012; TV5)
- Verum Est: Totoo ba 'to? (2001; ABS-CBN)
- Wag Kukurap (2004–2006; GMA)

== Infotainment ==
- AbanTECH at Negosyo (2025; Abante TV)
- Afternoon Delight (2024–2026; One News)
- Agri Abante (2025; Abante TV)
- Agri Business: How It Works (2013–2014; Studio 23/S+A)
- Agrikultura ETC (2012–2014; PTV)
- Agri Link (1993–1999; PTV)
- Agripreneur (2018–2019; GMA News TV, 2019–present; GMA)
- Agrisiete (1992–1998; GMA)
- Agri TV Atbp.: Kasama sa Hanapbuhay (2022–2023; IBC, 2023–present; One Sports)
- Aha! (2010–2025; GMA, 2023–2024; Pinoy Hits)
- Ako ‘To si Tyang Amy (2024–2025; TeleRadyo Serbisyo, 2024–present; Prime TV/PRTV Prime Media, 2025–present; DZMM TeleRadyo)
- Alamin na This (2021–present; DZRH News Television/DZRH TV)
- All About Dogs with Jamie (2026–present; RJ DigiTV)
- All About Rice (2019–2023; PTV)
- AM @ NBN (2002–2003; NBN)
- AM @ PTV (1998–1999; PTV)
- Amazing Earth (2018–present; GMA, 2023–2024; Pinoy Hits)
- Amazing Human Powers (2019–2023; PTV)
- Ang Galing Mo, Doc! (2007–present; TV Natin/RHTV/DZRH News Television/DZRH TV)
- Ang Gwenda Natin (2026–present; D8TV)
- Ang Pinaka (2005–2020; QTV/Q/GMA News TV)
- Ang Tinig Niyo (2023–2025; TeleRadyo Serbisyo, 2024–2025; Prime TV/PRTV Prime Media)
- Anong Ganap? (2023–2025; TeleRadyo Serbisyo, 2024–present; Prime TV/PRTV Prime Media, 2025–present; DZMM TeleRadyo)
- Aprub Yan! (2023–2025; TeleRadyo Serbisyo, 2024–present; Prime TV/PRTV Prime Media, 2025–present; DZMM TeleRadyo)
- Art2art (2007–2021, 2023–present; DZRH News Television/DZRH TV)
- ASEAN Para Sa'yo (2025–present; IBC/PTV)
- AT: Adulting in Tandem (2023–2024; Radyo Pilipinas 1 Television)
- ATM: Ano’ng Take Mo? (2023–2025; TeleRadyo Serbisyo, 2024–present; Prime TV/PRTV Prime Media, 2025–present; DZMM TeleRadyo)
- Auto Review (1994–present; PTV/NBN)
- Bago 'Yan Ah (2007–2013; DZMM TeleRadyo)
- Balikbayan (2005–2011; QTV/Q)
- Best Men (2011–2013; GMA News TV)
- Better Home Ideas (1996–2001; RPN)
- BFF: Beauty, Fun & Fashion (2008–2011; RHTV, 2020–2021; DZRH News Television)
- Bisaya Time (2019–present; DZRH News Television/DZRH TV)
- Boarding Pass (2014; GMA News TV)
- Botika ni Tita (2023–2024; Aliw 23)
- Bright Side (2020; GMA News TV)
- Brunch (2024–2025; One News)
- Buhay Pinoy (2004–2007; RPN, 2005–2008; ABC, 2012–2019; PTV)
- Buhay Unleash (2024–2025; True FM TV/True TV)
- Business Matters (2024; GTV, 2025–present; GMA)
- Buti na lang may SSS (2016–2020; Inquirer 990 Television)
- Candies (2005–2006; QTV)
- Chink Positive (2011–2019; AksyonTV, 2019–present; One PH, 2024–present; RPTV)
- Communicating with Wilma (1975–1980; IBC)
- Cook Eat Right (2011–2016; UNTV)
- Dami Mong Alam, Kuya Kim! (2024–present; GMA)
- Data Box Science Search (2019–2023; PTV)
- Dear Ate Juday (2022–2023; IZTV)
- Dear Ate Raquel (2018–present; DZRH News Television/DZRH TV)
- Dear Ate Reysie (2016–2020; Inquirer 990 Television)
- Department of Help (2023–2024; Aliw 23)
- Dishkarte of the Day (2016–2018; GMA News TV)
- Diskarte (2022–2023; TeleRadyo)
- Diskarteng MegaMilyonaryo (2024–2025; Bilyonaryo News Channel)
- Doctor, Next Door (2024–present; One PH)
- DZRH Icons (2008–2015; RHTV/DZRH News Television)
- Easy Lang Yan! (2010–2016; UNTV)
- Eat's Fun! (2024–present; PTV)
- Embassy Features (1983–1990; GMA)
- EO: Experts Opinion (2013–2019, 2019–2021, 2023–present; DZRH News Television/DZRH TV)
- ETC Hotlist (2009–2011, 2013–2022; ETC)
- ETC Location (2016–2022; ETC)
- ETC Vibe (2008–2011, 2013–2016; ETC)
- ETC Watchlist (2011–2013; ETC)
- Everyday Goodwill (2016–2020; Inquirer 990 Television)
- Fact or Fake (2025–2026; Aliw 23/DWIZ News TV)
- Fans Kita (2005–2006; QTV)
- Feel Kita (2023–2025; TeleRadyo Serbisyo, 2024–present; Prime TV/PRTV Prime Media, 2025–present; DZMM TeleRadyo)
- Feelings (2020–2023; One PH)
- Filipiknow (2012–2015; GMA News TV)
- Filipino at Heart (2025; GTV)
- Fillenials (2023–2024; Aliw 23)
- Follow The Money (2024–2025, 2026–present; Bilyonaryo News Channel)
- Future Perfect (2010–2020; ANC)
- G Diaries (2017–2020; ABS-CBN, 2020–2024; Kapamilya Channel)
- Gabay ng Pamilyang Marino (2016–2020; Inquirer 990 Television)
- Gabi ng Bading (2016–present; DZRH News Television/DZRH TV)
- Gabi ng Misteryo (2022–present; DZRH TV)
- Gandang Ricky Reyes (2005–2010; QTV/Q)
- Gawin ang Tama (2022–2023; IZTV, 2023–2024; Aliw 23)
- Generation RX (2005–2008; ABC, 2008–2014; Studio 23)
- Global Pinoy Konek (2023–2024; Radyo Pilipinas 1 Television)
- Go Agri (2023–present; Radyo Pilipinas 1 Television)
- Go Negosyo (2006–2007; RPN)
  - Go Negosyo Big Time (2007; RPN, 2008–2009; NBN)
  - Go Organic! (2009; NBN)
- Good Job (2019–2020; DZMM TeleRadyo, 2020; ANC, 2020–2023; TeleRadyo)
- Good News (2011–present; GMA News TV/GTV, 2023–2024; Pinoy Hits)
- Go Rampa with Me (2026–present; Bilyonaryo News Channel)
- H2H: Heart to Heart (2024–present; True FM TV/True TV)
- Hanap Buhay Diaries (2025–present; DZRH TV)
- Hapinas (2006–2008; QTV/Q)
- HaPinay (2020–2023; TeleRadyo)
- Hayop Mag-Alaga (2007–2009; IBC)
- Healing Galing (2011–2019; AksyonTV, 2015–2020, 2023; TV5, 2019–2020; One PH, 2020–2022; UNTV, 2023, 2025–present; GTV, 2023–2025; GMA)
- Health @ Home (2024–present; PTV)
- Health TV Embassy (2016–2020; Inquirer 990 Television)
- Home EcoNanay (2023–2024; Radyo Pilipinas 1 Television)
- iBilib (2012–present; GMA, 2023–2024; Pinoy Hits)
- iJuander (2011–present; GMA News TV/GTV)
- Images of Japan (2018–2023; PTV)
- Innermind on Radio (2007–2013; DZMM TeleRadyo)
- Ito ang Tahanan (2021–present; Net 25)
- Johnson, I-Kwento Mo (2024–2025; TeleRadyo Serbisyo/Prime TV/PRTV Prime Media)
- JTV Star Showcase (2013–2018; Jeepney TV)
- Kada Umaga (2021–present; Net 25)
- Kakaiba Ka (2016–2020; Inquirer 990 Television)
- Kakaibang Lunas (King's Herbal) (2013–2018; PTV, 2015–2017; TV5)
- KaLOGAN (2024–2025; DWAN TV)
- Kanya Kanyang Problema (2023–2025; DZRH TV)
- Kapatid with Joel Mendez (2005–2008; ABC)
- Kap's Amazing Stories (2007–2014; GMA)
- Ka-Blog! (2008–2010; GMA)
- Ka-Vendor (2023–2024; DZRH TV)
- KKK (2016–2020; Inquirer 990 Television)
- Konek Ka D'yan (2023–2025; TeleRadyo Serbisyo, 2024–2026; Prime TV/PRTV Prime Media, 2025–present; DZMM TeleRadyo)
- Kumikitang Kabuhayan (2002–2005; ABS-CBN)
- Kwento Nights (2025–2026; DZMM TeleRadyo)
- Let’s Prove It! (2023–2024; Aliw 23)
- Living Asia (2026–present; AllRadio TV)
- Love Idol (2011–2019; AksyonTV, 2019–2020; One PH)
- Love On Top (2025–present; Bilyonaryo News Channel)
- Love Pangga (2022–2023; IZTV, 2023–2025; Aliw 23, 2024–2025; DWIZ News TV)
- Love, Tonipet and Everythaaang! (2023–present; Net 25)
- Mag-Agri Tayo! (1993–present; PTV/NBN, 2026–present; Aliw 23/DWIZ News TV)
- Mag-Badyet Tayo (2019–2023; One PH, 2021–2023; TV5)
- Mag-Negosyo Tayo! (2005–2007; RPN)
- Mag-Usap Tayo (2016–2020; Inquirer 990 Television, 2022–2024; IZTV, 2023–2024; Aliw 23)
- Malending Gabby, Bayan! (2026–present; DWAN TV)
- Mari-Tres (2026–present; DZMM TeleRadyo)
- Mark In, Mark Out (2023–present; Radyo Pilipinas 1 Television)
- Masaganang Buhay (2020–present; One PH, 2024–present; RPTV)
- Master Builders (2018; GMA News TV)
- Mindanow (2026–present; AllRadio TV)
- Mindanow Network Hour (2025–present; IBC)
- Mommy Academy (2003–2005; NBN, 2003–2008; IBC)
- Mommylenials (2023–2024; Aliw 23)
- Money Masters (2025–present; One PH)
- MoneyWise (2016; GMA News TV)
- Motorcycle Republic (2024–2025; Net 25)
- Mr. Taxman (2022–present; IZTV, 2023–2024; Aliw 23, 2024–present; DWIZ News TV)
- My Puhunan (2013–2015, 2015–2020; ABS-CBN, 2015–2020; DZMM TeleRadyo, 2018–2020; Jeepney TV)
  - My Puhunan: Kaya Mo! (2023–present; Kapamilya Channel/A2Z/ANC, 2026–present; All TV)
- Nagmamahal, Tita Chupeta (2025–present; DWAN TV)
- Naked Minds (2026–present; IBC)
- NegoShow (2023–present; Aliw 23/DWIZ News TV)
- NegoSHEnte (2022–2023; TeleRadyo, 2023–2024; Pinoy Hits)
- Negoskarte (2026–present; D8TV)
- Negosiete: Mag-Aral sa GMA (1990–1998; GMA)
- Negosyo PH: From Idea to Kita (2026–present; Aliw 23/RPTV)
- Negosyo Atbp. (2005–2009; NBN, 2013–2023; DZRH News Television/DZRH TV)
- Negosyo Goals (2023; All TV, 2024; GTV)
- Night Talks (2026–present; Aliw 23/DWIZ News TV)
- Novartis Payo ni Doc (2002–2004; RPN)
- On the Money (2012–2020; ANC)
- One Morning Cafe (2007–2010; NBN/RPN/IBC)
- Open for Business (2020–present; Net 25)
- OrganiqueTV (2015–2017; Light Network/GMA News TV)
- Pamilya Talk with Tita Jing (2023–2024; Jeepney TV, 2024; All TV)
- Panalong Diskarte (2023–2025; TeleRadyo Serbisyo, 2024–present; Prime TV/PRTV Prime Media, 2025–present; DZMM TeleRadyo)
- Pangga Ruth Abao Live (2022–2023; IZTV, 2023–2025; Aliw 23, 2024–2025; DWIZ News TV)
- Pareng Pares (2025–2026; Aliw 23/DWIZ News TV)
- Pasikatin Na Yan (2020–2021; DZRH News Television)
- Pathways to Success (2024–2025; Bilyonaryo News Channel)
- Paul's Alarm (2023–present; Radyo Pilipinas 1 Television)
- Pay It Forward with Maricar Bautista (2025–present; Bilyonaryo News Channel)
- PEP News (2014–2019; Net 25)
- Pera-Pera Lang Yan (2024–2025; Aliw 23/DWIZ News TV)
- Pera at Kabuhayan (2016–2020; Inquirer 990 Television)
- Pera Talks (2025–present; Abante TV)
- Petiks Petiks Lang (2016–2020; Inquirer 990 Television)
- Pilipinas Online Bantay OCW (2016–2020; Inquirer 990 Television)
- Pinoy Explorer (2011–2014; TV5)
- Pinoy M.D. (2010–present; GMA)
- Pinoy, Panalo Ka! (2019–2020; DZMM TeleRadyo)
- Pinoy Pawnstars (2024–present; D8TV)
- Pinoy Records (2007–2010: GMA)
- Pisobilities (2012–2018; GMA News TV, 2012–2019; Light TV)
- Pit Stop Pinas (2025–present; PTV)
- Pop Talk (2011–2021; GMA News TV/GTV)
- Private Nights (2007–2020; DZMM TeleRadyo)
- Private Talks (2024–2025; TeleRadyo Serbisyo, 2025–present; DZMM TeleRadyo)
- Private Time (2024–present; One News)
- Quiet Moments (2023; TeleRadyo Serbisyo)
- Radyo Drama sa TV (2026–present; D8TV)
- Radyo Henyo (2017–present; DZRH News Television/DZRH TV)
- Radyo Klinika (2022–2023; IZTV/Aliw 23)
- Radyo Negosyo (2007–2020; DZMM TeleRadyo)
- Radyo Siyensya (2024–present; Radyo Pilipinas 1 Television)
- Raket (2023–2024; Aliw 23)
- Real Lives, Real People (2011–2014; Light TV, 2014–2016; PTV)
- Regional Roundup (2023–2025; Radyo Pilipinas 1 Television)
- Remoto Control (2012–2017; AksyonTV)
- Resilience Against Disaster (2019–2023; PTV)
- Retro TV (2003–2004; IBC)
- Rev+ (2017–present; ANC)
- Ride Radio (2019–2022, 2025–present; One PH)
- Rise N' Shine (2012–2015; UNTV)
- Sagot Kita, Sagot Ka ng Purina (2002–2004; IBC)
- Sakto (2014–2020; DZMM TeleRadyo, 2020–2023; Kapamilya Channel/TeleRadyo)
- Salaam Radio (2023–present; Radyo Pilipinas 1 Television)
- Sales Ladies (2008–2015; RHTV/DZRH News Television)
- Sana Lourd (2024–present; True FM TV/True TV, 2026–present; One PH)
- Sapulso (2006–2008; QTV/Q)
- Sari Sari Show (2008–2015; RHTV/DZRH News Television)
- Science of the Kitchen (2019–2023; PTV)
- Science Pinas (2025; GTV)
- Senior Citizen's Forum (2022–2023; IZTV, 2023–2025; Aliw 23, 2024–2025; DWIZ News TV)
- Sessions (2025–present; Bilyonaryo News Channel)
- Share Ko Lang (2023–2024; TeleRadyo Serbisyo, 2024; Prime TV)
- Shift Happens (2026–present; Bilyonaryo News Channel)
- Shop Talk (2006–2019; ANC)
- Shoptalk U Shop (2016–2020; Inquirer 990 Television)
- Shoutout (2024–2026; True FM TV/True TV)
- SikaPinoy (2007–2013; DZMM TeleRadyo)
- SME Go: Powered by Go Negosyo (2008–2015, 2016–2020; NBN/PTV, 2012–2013; GMA News TV)
- SMS: Social Media Stories (2018–2019; DZRH News Television)
- Spoon (2007–2015; Net 25)
- Stars Under Pressure (2025–present; One PH)
- StorIZ of Love (2022–2023; IZTV/Aliw 23)
- Success Secrets (2008–2018; RHTV/DZRH News Television)
- Talkback (2000–2020; ANC)
- Tambalang Balasubas at Balahura (2008–2015; RHTV/DZRH News Television)
- Tambayan sa Barangay 1206 (2024–2025; DWAN TV)
- Tara Peeps (2021–2023; DZRH TV)
- Tech Bytes (2025–present; Bilyonaryo News Channel)
- The A-List (2025–present; ANC)
- The Awesome Life (2019; GMA News TV, 2019–2020; Light TV)
- The Beat (2008–2011; Q)
- The Beauties of Nature (2019–2023; PTV)
- The Digital Cosmic Encyclopedia (2019–2023; PTV)
- The Final Pitch (2024–2025; One News)
- The Lovely Show (2026–present; One News/One PH)
- The Men's Room (2023–present; One News, 2025–present; TV5, 2026–present; RPTV)
- The Other Office (2024–present; Aliw 23)
- The Pillow Talk (2026–present; AllRadio TV)
- The Skin and Scalp Talk by Dermclinic (2016–2020; Inquirer 990 Television)
- The World of Mathematics (2019–2023; PTV)
- Thinking Out Loud (2008–2015; RHTV/DZRH News Television)
- Thumbs Up! (2011–2014; Studio 23)
- TikTalk ng Bayan (2024–present; Radyo Pilipinas 1 Television)
- Tita EM's Magazine (2016–present; DZRH News Television/DZRH TV)
- TNT: Tips N Tricks (2021–2023; DZRH News Television/DZRH TV)
- TNVS: Trending 'N Viral Show (2018–2019, 2021–present; DZRH News Television/DZRH TV)
- Tokyo Know How (2019–2023; PTV)
- Tomorrow Today (2003–2022; Net 25)
- Top 5: Mga Kwentong Marc Logan (2024–present; TV5/One PH, 2025–present; RPTV)
- Traditional Japanese Culture (2019–2023; PTV)
  - Traditional Japanese Sports (2019–2023; PTV)
- Trending Ngayon (2022–2023; IZTV/Aliw 23)
- Trending Now with Kelly Misa (2014–2017; ANC)
  - Trending with Kelly (2017–2021; ANC)
- True Confessions (2026–present; True TV)
- Turbo Time (2019; TV5, 2019–2020; One PH)
- Turbo Zone (2011−2020; GMA News TV, 2020–present; GMA)
- Turo-Turo (2014–2020; DZMM TeleRadyo)
- Txtube (2001–2006; GMA)
- T.Y.: Tuklas Yaman (2024–present; PTV)
- Uncle Bob's Lucky 7 Club (1961–1992; RBS/GMA)
- Unscripted (2025; Bilyonaryo News Channel)
- Usapang Agrikultura (2024–present; Radyo Pilipinas 1 Television)
  - Usapang Budget Natin (2024–present; Radyo Pilipinas 1 Television)
- Usapang Bilyonaryo (2023–2024; CNN Philippines, 2024–2025; Bilyonaryo News Channel)
- Usapang Kaperahan (2023; TeleRadyo Serbisyo)
- Usapang Payaman (2022–2023; IZTV, 2023–present; Aliw 23, 2024–present; DWIZ News TV)
- Vloggers ng Bagong Pilipinas (2025–present; Radyo Pilipinas 1 Television)
- Wais Konsyumer (2023–2025; TeleRadyo Serbisyo, 2024–2025; Prime TV/PRTV Prime Media, 2026–present; DZMM TeleRadyo)
- Where in Manila (2025; GMA)
- Wholesome Meals, Better Life (2018–2024; CNN Philippines)
- Win Today (2023–2025; TeleRadyo Serbisyo, 2024–present; Prime TV/PRTV Prime Media, 2025–present; DZMM TeleRadyo)
- Winner Sa Life (2020–2023; TeleRadyo)
- Woke Up Like This! (2025–present; DWAN TV)
- Wonderful Science (2019–2023; PTV)
- World of Wonders (2019–2023; PTV)
- Wow Sikat (2023–2025; TeleRadyo Serbisyo, 2024–2025; Prime TV/PRTV Prime Media, 2025; DZMM TeleRadyo)
- Yan ang Bata (1990–1993; GMA)
- Yan si Mommy (1991–1993; GMA)
- Yes Yes Yo Topacio (2022–2023; IZTV, 2023–2026; Aliw 23, 2024–2026; DWIZ News TV)

== Lifestyle ==
- 3R (Respect, Relax, Respond) (2004–2005; GMA, 2005–2006; QTV, 2008–2009; TV5)
- AM @ IBC (2003–2009; IBC)
- Ang Maging Pilipino (2026–present; D8TV)
- At Home Ka Dito (2004–2007; ABS-CBN)
- At the Table (2018–present; ANC)
- At the Top (2015; PTV)
- At Your Home (2022–present; One PH)
- Ating Alamin (1980–2016; MBS/PTV/NBN/PTV, 1994–2005, 2007–2009; IBC, 2005–2007; ABC, 2010–2013; UNTV)
- Bawat Gising May Blessing! (2024–2025; DWAN TV)
- Beauty School Plus (1994–2005; New Vision 9/RPN)
- Beauty School with Ricky Reyes (1988–1990; IBC, 1990–1994; New Vision 9)
- Beyond Wellness with Ms. P (2022–2023; IZTV, 2023–2024; Aliw 23, 2024; DWIZ News TV)
- Bisaya Ni! (2025–present; A2Z Regional)
- Bodies and Motions (1994–2000; ABC)
- Booze Traveler (2018–present; ANC)
- Buhay at Kalusugan (2021–present; Veritas TV)
- Chinatown TV (produced by Horizon of the Sun Communications) (2010–present; GNN/One Media, 2010–2020, 2021–2023, 2023–present; IBC)
- Chinese By Blood, Global By Heart (produced by Fil-Chi Media Productions) (2025–present; Bilyonaryo News Channel)
- Clinica Flavier (2019–2021; One PH)
- D8TV All Access (2026–present; D8TV)
- Entrepinas TV (2022, 2023–2024, 2024; PTV)
- Executive Class (2005–present; ANC)
- F! (1999–2003; ABS-CBN, 2003–2006; Studio 23)
- Fashbook (2011–2014; GMA News TV)
- Fit & Fab (2008–2010; Q)
- Gen M (2010–2011; ETC)
- Get Fit (2020–2024; CNN Philippines)
- Good Vibes (2017–2020; DZMM TeleRadyo/TeleRadyo)
- Graceful Living (2016–present; ANC)
- Green & Fab (2015; PTV)
- Green Living (2011–2020; ANC)
- Health Check Plus (2020–present; DZRH News Television/DZRH TV)
- Health Habit (2025–2026; Aliw 23/DWIZ News TV)
- Healthy Minute (2025–present; DZRH TV)
- Healthy Sabado (2018–2020; DZMM TeleRadyo)
- Home Base (2012–2015; GMA News TV)
- I-Connect: Balitang Social Media (2012–2013; PTV)
- Iwas Sakit, Iwas Gastos (2023–2025; TeleRadyo Serbisyo, 2024–present; Prime TV/PRTV Prime Media, 2025–present; DZMM TeleRadyo)
- Kaagapay sa Kalusugan (2026–present; DZMM TeleRadyo/PRTV Prime Media)
- Kabuhayan at Negosyo (2024–present; Aliw 23/DWIZ News TV)
- Kawangga Warriors (2026–present; D8TV)
- Kwento Juan (2026–present; D8TV)
- Klinika 630 (2024–2025; TeleRadyo Serbisyo/Prime TV/PRTV Prime Media)
- Konnichiwa Manila (2024; All TV)
- Level Up (2016–2020; Inquirer 990 Television)
- Life Balance (2025–present; Aliw 23/DWIZ News TV)
- Living It Up (2007–2009; Q)
- Lunas (2007–present; TV Natin/RHTV/DZRH News Television/DZRH TV)
  - Lunas Extension (2007–present; TV Natin/RHTV/DZRH News Television/DZRH TV)
  - Lunas Sunday Edition (2007–present; TV Natin/RHTV/DZRH News Television/DZRH TV)
- Ma-Beauty Po Naman (2007–2020; DZMM TeleRadyo)
- Magandang Gabi Dok (2008–2017; DZMM TeleRadyo)
- Mag-Agree Tayo! (2024–present; DWAN TV)
- Magsasaka TV (2018; PTV)
- Maine Goals (2021–2023; BuKo Channel, 2023; TV5)
- Metro Escape (2026–present; D8TV)
- Mga Kuwentong MX3 (2026–present; TV5)
- Modern Living TV (2014–present; ANC)
- MomBiz (2019, 2020, 2022, 2023; One PH)
- NegoSiyensya (2026–present; GTV)
- Out! (2004–2005; GMA)
- Perfect Moments (ABS-CBN)
- Philippine Reality TV (2008–present; ANC)
- Pop Talk (2011–2021; GMA News TV, 2021; GTV)
- Rampa (2025–present; Bilyonaryo News Channel)
- Recreate (2021–present; One News)
- Ride PH (2019, 2020, 2022, 2023–present; One PH, 2024–present; RPTV)
- RX Plus (2014–2020; S+A)
- Sa Kabukiran (2007–2020; DZMM TeleRadyo)
- Sa Kabukiran at Kabuhayan (2022–2023; IZTV, 2023–2026; Aliw 23, 2024–2026; DWIZ News TV)
- Sagot ni Dok (2026–present; AllRadio TV/All TV)
- She..Ka! (2007–2011; NBN)
- Show Me the Market (2018–present; ANC)
- Spotlight (2024–2025; All TV)
- State of the Art (2018–present; ANC)
- StyLIZed (2014; ETC)
- Tagumpay sa Kalusugan (2008–2015; RHTV/DZRH News Television)
- Tahanang Pinoy (2002–2007; ABC)
- Tara! Lets Eat! (2009–2011; Q)
- Taste Buddies (2012–2022; GMA News TV/GTV)
- Taumbahay (2012–2019; Net 25)
- Team FitFil (2020; S+A, 2020–2024; Kapamilya Channel)
- The Art Show (2018–present; ANC)
- The Daily Dish (2025–present; Bilyonaryo News Channel)
- The Lifestyle Lab with Marie (2024–present; Bilyonaryo News Channel)
- The Secret of Health (2024–present; DZRH TV, 2026–present; DZMM TeleRadyo/PRTV Prime Media)
- The Sweet Life (2007–2011; Q)
- The Wine Show (2018–present; ANC)
- TWGRR: D'World of Gandang Ricky Reyes (2010–2020; Q/GMA News TV)
- Urban Zone (2006–2012; ABS-CBN)
- Us Girls (2006–2012; Studio 23)
- Veggie, Meaty & Me (1992–1996; New Vision 9/RPN)
- Wellness is Wealth (2026–present; Bilyonaryo News Channel)
- X Life (2010–2011; Q)
- Your Daily Do's (2020–2023; TeleRadyo)

== Movie Blocks ==
- 3rd Row (2007–2011; 2nd Avenue)
- 5 Max Movies (2008−2010; TV5)
- ABCinema (1992–1998, 2004–2008; ABC)
- ABS-CBN Presents (ABS-CBN)
- AC Asian Weekday Movie Fest (2019–2020; Asianovela Channel)
- AC Weekend Cinema (2018–2020; Asianovela Channel)
- Action Flix (2020–present; Heart of Asia)
- Action Movie Zone (2014−2017; S+A)
- Action Spectacular (2020–2021; TV5)
- Action Theater (1993–2001; ABC)
- Afternoon Movie Break (2020–present; GMA News TV/GTV)
- Afternoon Zinema (2022–present; A2Z)
- AllFlix (2022; All TV)
  - AllFlix Linggo Hits (2024; All TV)
  - AllFlix Marathon (2022–2023; All TV)
  - AllFlix Noon Fix (2022–2024; All TV)
  - AllFlix Pinoy Picks (2023–2024; All TV)
  - AllFlix Prime (2022–2024; All TV)
  - AllFlix Sabado Hits (2023–2024; All TV)
  - AllFlix Sunday Hits (2023–2024; All TV)
- All-Out Action (2022–present; Solar Sports)
- American Movies (1961–1972; RBS)
- Ang Hari: FPJ Da King (2018–2020; ABS-CBN)
- Asian Cinemix (2022–present; Heart of Asia)
- Astig Anime Friday (2024–present; Heart of Asia)
- Back to the Movies (2015–2016; Jeepney TV)
- Barkada Nights (2003–2014; Studio 23)
- Barkada Nights Plus (2004–2009; Studio 23)
- Bida Asia (2024–present; Heart of Asia)
- Block Screening (2021−present; I Heart Movies)
- Blockbuster Bida (2024−2025; RPTV)
- Blockbuster Cinema (2002–2003; GMA)
- Blockbusters sa Umaga (2026–present; Kapamilya Channel/A2Z/All TV/TV5)
- C/S Blockbusters (2008–2009; C/S9)
- C/S Movie Mania (2009; C/S9)
- Christian Cinema (2023–present; Light TV)
- Classic Movies (2022–2023; RJ DigiTV)
- Classic Comedy Movies (2021–2022; RJ DigiTV)
- Cine Cinco (2021–2023; TV5)
  - Cine Cinco Astig Sunday (2024−present; TV5, 2025–present; RPTV)
  - Cine Cinco Classics (2023−2024; TV5)
  - Cine Cinco Hit na Hit (2024–present; TV5, 2025–present; RPTV)
  - Cine Cinco Hits (2024; TV5)
  - Cine Cinco Hollywood (2024; TV5)
  - Cine Cinco K-Hits (2023−2024; TV5)
  - Cine Cinco sa Hapon (2025–2026; TV5/RPTV)
  - Cine Cinco Primetime (2026; TV5)
  - Cine Cinco sa Umaga (2024–2026; TV5)
  - Cine Cinco: Sabado Nights (2023−2024; TV5)
  - Cine Cinco Weekend Hits (2024; TV5)
  - Cine Cinco Weekend Saya (2024−2026; TV5, 2025–2026; RPTV)
- Cine Pinoy (1975–1988, 1989–1991; IBC/Islands TV 13)
- Cinema...Cinema...Cinema (1999–2006; ABS-CBN)
- Cinema FPJ: Da King on ABS-CBN (2007–2010; ABS-CBN)
- Cinema G! (2024−present; GTV)
- Early Viva Movies (GMA)
- ETC Flix (2013–2018, 2020–2022; ETC)
- ETCinema (2020–2022; ETC)
- Feel na Films (2020–present; Heart of Asia)
- FPJ Action Cinema (2001–2003; ABS-CBN)
  - FPJ: Ang Nag-Iisang Alamat (2013–2014; Studio 23)
  - FPJ: Da King (2020–2023; Kapamilya Channel/A2Z, 2021–2023; TV5)
  - FPJ: Da King Magpakailanman (2013–2018; Jeepney TV)
  - FPJ: Da King on ABS-CBN (2013–2014; ABS-CBN)
  - FPJ: Hari ng Aksyon (2015–2024; Cine Mo!)
  - FPJ: Hari ng Pinoy Cinema (2013–2024; Cinema One)
  - FPJ: Kampeon ng Aksyon (2014−2017; S+A)
- FPJ sa GMA (1987–1995, 2025–present; GMA)
  - FPJ sa G! Flicks (2025–present; GTV)
- Friday Box Office (1996–2004; ABC)
- Friday Fan Faves (2020–2021; TV5)
- Friday Night Action (2013; TV5)
- G! Flicks (2021−present; GTV)
- Ginintuang Telon (2005−2006; QTV)
- GMA Blockbusters (2013–2025; GMA, 2023; GTV)
  - GMA Blockbusters: Weekday Edition (2013–2014; GMA)
- GMA Gems (1986–1992; GMA)
- GMA SineBabad (2014; GMA)
- GMA's Best (1992–2002; GMA)
- Golden Age Cinema (2021; I Heart Movies)
- HallyFlix (2022–2023; Hallypop)
- Holiday Gifts (2020–2021; GMA News TV)
- Hollywood Blockbusters (2024; RPTV)
- Hollywood Cineplex (2020–2021; One Screen)
- Hollywood Movie (2021; TV5)
- IBCinema (1975–1988; IBC)
  - IBCinema Nights (2006–2008; IBC)
  - IBCinema Presents (1986–1988; IBC)
- IBC Movie Serials (IBC)
- IBC Specials (IBC)
- International Film Classics (ABS-CBN)
- Jungo Pinoy Presents (2023–2024; Hallypop)
- Kaibigan Special Sunday (2019; IBC)
- Kapamilya Action Sabado (2020–2026; Kapamilya Channel, 2026; All TV)
- Kapamilya Blockbusters (2010–2020; ABS-CBN, 2020–2022, 2023–2026; Kapamilya Channel, 2026; All TV)
- Kapamilya Cinema (2004–2007; ABS-CBN)
- Kapamilya Gold Hits (2020–present; Kapamilya Channel, 2026–present; All TV)
- Kapamilya Mega Blockbusters (2015–2018; ABS-CBN)
- Kapatid Sunday Specials (2026–present; TV5)
- Kapuso Movie Festival (2006−present; GMA)
- Kapuso Movie Night (2011–2020; GMA)
- Kapuso Primetime Cinema (2013–2014, 2015–2016, 2023−2024, 2025; GMA)
- Kapuso Sine Klasika (2014, 2015–2017; GMA)
- KB Family Weekend (2017–2020; ABS-CBN, 2020–2026; Kapamilya Channel, 2026; All TV)
- KB Sabado (2023; Kapamilya Channel)
- Kid Sine Presents (2021−2024; Jeepney TV)
- Late Night Delight (2022−present; SolarFlix)
- Let's Go Linggo (2012–2015; Jeepney TV)
- Light Cinema Specials (2011−2023; Light TV)
- Lunch Blockbusters (2014−2017; S+A)
- Lunch Box Office (2003–2014; Studio 23)
- Lunchtime Movie Hits (2024; GMA)
- Marvelous Golden Movies (1986–1992; GMA)
- Mega Blockbusters (2024–2026; A2Z/Kapamilya Channel, 2026; All TV)
- Million Dollar Movies (1971–1972; ABC, 1987–1998; ABS-CBN)
- Monday Night Blockbusters (2013–2014; TV5)
- Movie Central Presents (2020–present; Kapamilya Channel, 2026; All TV)
- Movie Eye (1980–1996; IBC)
- Movie Max 5 (2014−2018; TV5)
- Movietime (1975–1986, 1989–1990; IBC)
- MVP: Monday Viva Presentations (1994–1997; GMA)
- Noontime Movie Hits (2025–present; GTV)
- Now Showing (2000–2001; IBC, 2017−2020; GMA News TV)
- Piling-Piling Pelikula (1975–1996; IBC)
- Pinilakang Tabing (1975–1988; IBC)
- Pinoy Aksyon Hits (2004–2006; IBC)
- Pinoy Blockbusters (1998–2002; GMA)
- Pinoy Cine Klasika (2010−2011; Q)
- Pinoy Mega Hits (2022−present; SolarFlix)
- Pinoy Movie Break (2020; GMA News TV)
- Pinoy Movie Date (2021−present; I Heart Movies)
- Pinoy Movie Hits (2007–2008; ABS-CBN)
- Primetime Mega-Hits (2019–2020; TV5)
- Primetime Sinemax (2006–2008; IBC)
- Primetime Zinema (2020–2021; A2Z)
- Rainbow Cinema (1995–1999; GMA)
- Rated: Chick Flicks (2008–2011; Q)
- Reel Action Sabado (2014–2019; GMA News TV)
- Reel Time (2022–present; SolarFlix)
- Regal Movies (2022–2023; TV5)
- Regal Originals (2020–2021; One Screen)
- Regal Presents (ABS-CBN)
- Regal Treasures (2022−2025; GTV)
- Sabado Showdown (2005−2009; QTV/Q)
- Sabado Sineplex (2011–2013; TV5)
- Sabado Sinerama (2013; TV5)
- Sabado Zine (2023; A2Z)
- Saturday Blockbuster (2012–2013; TV5)
- Saturday Blockbusters (1991−1995; Islands TV 13/IBC)
- Saturday Cinema Hits (2021−2022, 2023−present; GTV)
- Saturday Night Blockbuster (1996–1998; ABC)
- Saturday Night Blockbusters (2006–2008; ABC)
- Saturday Night Movies (2000–2001; ABC)
- Saturday Night Playhouse (1986–2007; RPN)
- Saturday Night Specials (1998–2003; ABC)
- Sci-Fi Picks (2024–present; Heart of Asia)
- Scream Flix (2021–2024; Hallypop)
- Screams on Screen (2020–2022, 2024–present; Heart of Asia)
- Siesta Fiesta Movies (2020−2022, 2023−2024; GMA News TV/GTV)
- Sine Aksyon sa Kuatro (1987–1992; PTV)
- Sine Asya (2020–2021; TV5)
- Sinebisyon (1974–1986; KBS/RPN)
- Sine Date Weekends (2020−2022, 2023−present; GMA News TV/GTV)
- Sine Huwebes sa Kuatro (1989–1992; PTV)
- Sine Itutuloy (2009–2010; IBC)
- Sine Ko 5ingko (2013–2014; TV5)
  - Sine Ko 5ingko Indie ‘To! (2013; TV5)
  - Sine Ko 5ingko Premiere (2013–2014; TV5)
- Sinemaks (1998–2003; IBC)
- Sine Sabado (2012–2014; GMA News TV)
- Sine Saya (2025–2026; BuKo Channel)
- Sine Siesta (2022–present; Solar Flix)
- Sine Spectacular (2019–2020; TV5)
- Sine Spotlight (2022–2023; TV5)
- Sine Squad (2016–2019; TV5)
  - Sine Squad Prime (2018–2019; TV5)
  - Sine Squad Saturday (2019; TV5)
  - Sine Squad Sunday (2019; TV5)
- Sine Throwback (2022–present; Net 25)
- Sine Todo (2021–2022; TV5)
- Sinetanghali (2011–2013; TV5)
- SNBO: Sunday Night Box Office (1997–2020; GMA)
- Solar's Big Ticket (2010–2011; Solar TV)
- Solar's Golden Ticket (2009–2010; Solar TV)
- Spectacular Action on Screen (1986–1990; IBC)
- Star Cinema Presents (2013; ABS-CBN/Studio 23)
- Strictly Pinoy (2020–present; Heart of Asia)
- Studio 23 Presents (1996–2014; Studio 23)
- Summer Super Sine (2011; TV5)
- Sunday Aksyon Hits (2003–2009; IBC)
- Sunday Blockbuster (2012–2013; TV5)
- Sunday Blockbusters (2024–2026; Kapamilya Channel/A2Z, 2024; TV5, 2026; All TV)
- Sunday Combo Panalo (2024–2025; RPTV)
- Sunday Hi-Way (2015–2017; Jeepney TV)
- Sunday Kapamilya Blockbusters (2022; Kapamilya Channel)
- Sunday Noontime Blockbusters (2026–present; Kapamilya Channel/All TV/A2Z)
- Sunday Night Blockbusters (1996–2009; Studio 23)
- Sunday Night Movies (2000–2001; ABC)
- Sunday Night Special (1995–1996; ABC)
- Sunday Night Specials (1996–1999; ABC)
- Sunday Screening (2012–2019; GMA News TV)
- Sunday Sineplex (2011–2013, 2013–2014; TV5)
- Sunday Super Sine (2005–2009; QTV/Q)
- Sunday Zine Hits (2020; A2Z)
- Sunday's Best (2006–2020; ABS-CBN, 2020–present; Kapamilya Channel, 2026–present; All TV)
- Sunday's Big Event (1986–2006; RPN/New Vision 9)
- Super Kapamilya Blockbusters (2020–present; Kapamilya Channel, 2026–present; All TV)
- Super Sine 5 (2011–2013; TV5)
- Super Sine Prime (2012–2013; TV5)
- Tagalog Movie Greats (1988–1992; ABS–CBN)
- Takilya Blockbusters (2012–2014–2017; GMA News TV)
- Takilya Throwback (2021−present; I Heart Movies)
- Tatak James Bond (2017−2018; Jeepney TV)
- Telesine Presents (2020–2023; GMA, 2023–2024; Pinoy Hits)
- TeleViva Specials (2001; IBC)
- The Big Night (1992–2004; ABC)
- The Big Picture (2020–2023; GMA News TV/GTV)
- The Screening Room (2011–2018; 2nd Avenue)
- Timeless Telesine (2021−2024; I Heart Movies)
- Tuesday Christmas Countdown (2013; TV5)
- Tuesday Happy Hour (2014; TV5)
- Tuesday Movie Treat (1993; IBC)
- TV Flix (2020–2021; TV5)
- Viva Action Cinema (2001; IBC)
- Viva Box Office (2001–2003; IBC/ABC)
- Viva Box Office Hits (1986–1988; IBC/GMA)
- Viva Movie Classics (2022–2023; GTV)
- Viva Premiere Night (2000–2001; IBC)
- Viva Proudly Presents (2000–2001; IBC)
- Viva Sinerama (1992−2002; GMA)
- Watcha Morning (2024–2025; RPTV)
- Wednesday Night Thriller (2013; TV5)
- Weekend CinePrime (2024–2026; RPTV)
- Weekend Sine Nights (2022–present; Solar Flix)
- Zine Aksyon (2020–2026; A2Z)
- Zine Love (2020–2022; A2Z)
- Zinema Presents (2020; A2Z)
- Zinema sa Umaga (2020–2026; A2Z)

== Music ==
- 80s Sabado (2024–2025; True FM TV/True TV)
- All Dance (2026–present; AllRadio TV)
- All Easy (2026–present; AllRadio TV)
- All Hits 25 (2026–present; AllRadio TV)
- All Pinoy (2026–present; AllRadio TV)
- All Pop (2026–present: AllRadio TV)
- America's Top 10 (1981–1993; IBC)
- ASOP: A Song of Praise Music Festival International (2011–2025; UNTV)
- Awit Para Sa'yo (2026–present; Aliw 23/DWIZ News TV)
- Back to Classics (2024–2025; DWAN TV)
- Beautiful Sunday (2026–present; Aliw 23/DWIZ News TV)
- Bravo Executive Lounge (2019–present; RJ DigiTV)
- CMV Spotlight (2018–2023; INC TV, 2018–2025; Net 25)
- Concert at the Park (1977–1980; GTV, 1980–1986; MBS, 1986–1990, 1991–2001, 2011–2012; PTV, 1990–1991; GMA, 2001–2011; NBN)
- Decades of Sound: Classics to Now (2024–present; DWAN TV)
- DMV: Dream Music Videos (2004–2008; ABC)
- Dr. Love: Always and Forever (2012–2017; DZMM TeleRadyo)
- Dr. Love Music Show (2011–2012; DZMM TeleRadyo)
- Dream FM Playlist (2004–2008; ABC)
- Dwance Groove (2024; DWAN TV)
- DZRH Love Chat (2011–2012; RHTV)
- DZRH with Love (2017–2025; DZRH News Television/DZRH TV)
- ETC Music Specials (2013–2019; ETC)
- Evening Chill (2024–2025; True FM TV/True TV)
- Friyay Night (2026–present; AllRadio TV)
- Gising Gising! (2024–2025; True TV)
- Goldenberg: The Concert Series (2024–present; PTV)
- Golden Melodies (2026–present; Aliw 23/DWIZ News TV)
- Hataw Na... Umaga Na! (2026–present; Aliw 23/DWIZ News TV)
- Himig at Balita (2026; Aliw 23/DWIZ News TV)
- Hallypop Fresh (2022–2024; Hallypop)
- Hallypop Hits (2022–2024; Hallypop)
- Hallypop Lokal (2022–2024; Hallypop)
- Hatinggabi sa DZMM (DZMM TeleRadyo)
- Highest Praise (SMNI)
- House of Praise (2012–2023; Light TV)
- Ignite Gospel Music Festival (2012–2016; Light TV)
- I-Music (2007; RPN)
- INConcert (2020–present; INC TV)
- INC Music Videos (2010–2012; GEM TV, 2018–2019, 2020–present; INC TV)
- INCTV Interactive Roadshow (2022–present; INC TV)
- Jam (2015–2018; GMA News TV/Light TV)
- Jukebox Favorites (2024–present; True FM TV/True TV)
- Jukebox Weekends (2026–present; Aliw 23/DWIZ News TV)
- KanTanghalian (2026–present; Aliw 23/DWIZ News TV)
- KIIQ Music (2016–2020; Inquirer 990 Television)
- K-Paps Playlist (2023–2025; TeleRadyo Serbisyo, 2024–present; Prime TV/PRTV Prime Media, 2025–present; DZMM TeleRadyo)
- Kundiman Atbp. (2025–present; PTV)
- Let's Groove with Roaring 20's Band (2021–present; RJ DigiTV)
- Love Konek (2024–2025; TeleRadyo Serbisyo, 2025–present; DZMM TeleRadyo)
- Lovelines (2007–2013; DZMM TeleRadyo)
- LSS: Love Stories & Songs (2026; True TV)
- M Countdown (2021–2022; TV5)
- Me and My Music (2026; Aliw 23/DWIZ News TV)
- MMS: My Music Station (2005–2007; QTV/Q)
- Mobile Circuit (2024–present; DWAN TV)
- Moonlight Serenade (2013–2020; DZMM TeleRadyo)
- Morning Chill (2024–2025; True FM TV/True TV)
- MP3 (2008–2009; TV5)
- MTV Philippines (2005; IBC)
- MTV Top 20 Pilipinas (2016; TV5)
- Music and Memories (2007–2013; DZMM TeleRadyo)
- Music and News (2023; Radyo Pilipinas 1 Television)
- Music Automation (2023–2024; TeleRadyo Serbisyo, 2024–present; DWAN TV)
- Music Bank (2020–2024 / Starting EP 1000 to I Can't Stop Me Era; Hallypop)
- Music of Your Life (2026; Aliw 23/DWIZ News TV)
- Music Video Features (1992–2000; GMA)
- Music Zone (2007; CLTV)
- Musika at Balitaan (2022–2023; IZTV)
- My Myx (2001–2002; Studio 23, 2002–2020; Myx)
- Myx Backtrax (2002–2021; Myx)
- Myx Daily Top 10 (2002–2025; Myx)
  - Myx Daily Top 10 Pinoy Edition (2016–2018; Myx)
  - Myx Daily Top 10 International Edition (2016–2018; Myx)
- Myx International Top 20 (2007–2026)
- Myx Premiere (Myx)
- Myx Press Play (2021–present; Myx)
- Myx Recall (2001–2002; Studio 23/Myx)
- Myx Sure-Fire Hits (–2021; Myx)
- Oras Para sa Musika (2023–present; Radyo Pilipinas 1 Television)
- OPM, Atin Ito (2024–2025; True FM TV/True TV)
- OPM Rewind (2024–2025; DWAN TV)
- OPM sa DWIZ (2022–2023; IZTV, 2023–2025; Aliw 23, 2024–2025; DWIZ News TV)
- Paco Park Presents (1991–2001, 2011–2012; PTV, 2001–2011; NBN)
- PinoyAll (2026–present; AllRadio TV)
- Pinoy Myx (2009–2021; Myx)
- Pinoy Myx Countdown (2005–2026; Myx)
- Pinoy Rock Myx (Myx)
- Playlist (2022–2023; PIE Channel)
- Play Music Videos (2001–2005; Net 25)
- Pop Myx (2001–2002; Studio 23, 2002–2021; Myx)
  - Pop My Myx (Myx)
  - Pop Myx: K-Pop Edition (Myx)
- Praise, Inc. (2023–present; Light TV)
- Praise Songs (2026–present; AllRadio TV)
- Remember When (2013–2020; DZMM TeleRadyo)
- Remember Your Music (2024–2025; TeleRadyo Serbisyo, 2025–present; DZMM TeleRadyo)
- RJ Sunday Jam (2003–2018; RJTV, 2018–present; RJ DigiTV)
- Sabado Night Vibe (2024–2025; True FM TV/True TV)
- Sayaw Linggo (2024–2025; True FM TV/True TV)
- Sayaw Sabado (2024–2025; True FM TV/True TV)
- SBN Karaoke (2001–2006; SBN)
- SBN Music Videos (2000–2007; SBN)
- Senior Moments (2019–2022; DZRH News Television/DZRH TV, 2025–2026; Aliw 23/DWIZ News TV)
- Sentimental Mornings (2026–present; Aliw 23/DWIZ News TV)
- Sessions on 25th Street (2011–2018; Net 25)
- Shuffle: Honoring God Through Music (2022, 2024–present; Light TV, 2023–present; A2Z)
- Shortime (2013–2017; RHTV/DZRH News Television)
- Simply K-Pop (2021–2024; Hallypop, 2023–present; Myx)
- Songhits: Tunog Pinoy (2018; DZMM TeleRadyo)
- Soul Mix (2006–2010; ABC/TV5)
- SS Dog Top 10 (2025–present; Sing Song)
- SS Sure Fire Hits (2018–present; Sing Song)
- Star Music Videos (1995–2002; ABS-CBN)
- Star Myx (2002–2021; Myx)
- Sunday's Weekend Delight (2026–present; Aliw 23/DWIZ News TV)
- Thank God it's RJ (2002–2018; RJTV, 2018–present; RJ DigiTV)
- The Drive Time Show (2018–present; RJ DigiTV)
- The Pop Phenomenon: K-pop and P-pop (2024–2025; DWAN TV)
- True Classics (2025; True TV)
- True Hit List (2024–2025; True FM TV/True TV)
- True Love Songs (2024–2025; True FM TV/True TV)
- Txtube (2001–2006; GMA)
- UNTV Music Videos (2001–2004; UNTV)
- Vibe (2025–2026; TV5/One PH/True TV, 2025–2026; BuKo Channel/Sari-Sari Channel, 2026; Kapatid Channel)
  - Vibe Nights (2025–present; TV5/One PH/BuKo Channel, 2025–2026; True TV)
  - Vibe Plus (2026–present; TV5/One PH/Kapatid Channel)
  - Vibe Up (2025–2026; TV5/True TV/BuKo Channel)
  - Vibe TV (2025–2026; TV5/One PH/True TV/BuKo Channel/Sari-Sari Channel)
- Vid-OK D-Day (1990s–2002; Vid-OK)
- Vid-OK Hit Chart (1990s–2002; Vid-OK)
- Vid-OK Hotline (1990s–2002; Vid-OK)
- Video Hit Parade (1986–1992; ABS-CBN)
- Video Hot Tracks (1994–2000; ABC)
- Vinyl Sundays (2026–present; AllRadio TV)
- Viva Hot Hits (2001–2002; IBC)
- Viva Music Channel (2001–2002; IBC)
- Weekendtahan (2026–present; Aliw 23/DWIZ News TV)
- Wish 1075 TV (2016; UNTV)
- Yesterday (2010–2020; DZMM TeleRadyo, 2020; TeleRadyo)

== News ==
- 1062 kHz Balita Update (2002–2007; Net 25)
- 13 News (2025–present; IBC, 2026–present; DWAN TV)
- 24 Oras (2004–present; GMA, 2020–present; GMA News TV/GTV, 2023–2024; Pinoy Hits, 2023; I Heart Movies)
  - 24 Oras Amianan (2015–2016; GMA Dagupan/GMA Baguio)
  - 24 Oras Bikol (2014–2015; GMA Naga)
  - 24 Oras Breaking News (2018–2020; GMA)
  - 24 Oras Bulletin (2019; GMA)
  - 24 Oras Central Visayas (2014–2016; GMA Cebu)
  - 24 Oras Davao (2016–2017; GMA Davao)
  - 24 Oras Ilokano (2014–2015; GMA Laoag)
  - 24 Oras News Alert (2020–2023; GMA, 2023; Pinoy Hits)
  - 24 Oras North Central Luzon (2014–2015; GMA Dagupan/GMA Baguio)
  - 24 Oras Northern Mindanao (2014–2015; GMA Cagayan de Oro)
  - 24 Oras Southern Mindanao (2014–2015; GMA Davao)
  - 24 Oras Weekend (2010–present; GMA, 2020–2021; GMA News TV, 2021–present; GTV, 2023–2024; Pinoy Hits)
  - 24 Oras Western Visayas (2014–2015; GMA Iloilo/GMA Bacolod)
- A2Z News Alert (2020; A2Z)
- Abante Express (2025–present; Abante TV)
- Abante Radyo Balita Buong Bansa (2024–2025; Abante TeleTabloid/Abante TV)
  - Abante Radyo Balita Buong Bansa Weekend (2024–2025; Abante TeleTabloid/Abante TV)
- Abante Radyo Balita Ngayon (2025; Abante TV)
- Abante Radyo Balita Quickie (2024–2025; Abante TeleTabloid)
- Abante Radyo Balita Weekend (2025; Abante TV)
- Abante sa Tanghali (2025–present; Abante TV)
  - Abante sa Tanghali Weekend (2025–present; Abante TV)
- Abante sa Umaga (2025–2026; Abante TV)
  - Abante sa Umaga Weekend (2025–present; Abante TV)
- ABS-CBN Breaking News (2000–2005; ABS-CBN)
- ABS-CBN Headlines (2000–2003; ABS-CBN/ANC)
- ABS-CBN Insider (2003–2006; ABS-CBN/ANC)
- ABS-CBN International Report (1986–1990; ABS-CBN)
- ABS-CBN News Advisory (1986–2005; ABS-CBN)
- ABS-CBN Weekend News (2001–2005; ABS-CBN/ANC)
- ACS Balita (2013–present; RHTV/DZRH News Television/DZRH TV)
- Agenda (2024–present; Bilyonaryo News Channel, 2024–2025; Abante TeleTabloid, 2025–present; Abante TV)
  - Agenda North America (2026–present; Bilyonaryo News Channel)
  - Agenda Weekend (Weekend Agenda) (2024–present; Bilyonaryo News Channel)
- Agila Balita (2013–2020; Net 25)
  - Agila Balita sa Umaga (2020; Net 25)
  - Agila Balita Washington DC (2013–2020; Net 25)
  - Agila Pilipinas (2019–2021; Net 25)
  - Agila Probinsiya (2014–2021; Net 25)
- Agila Reports (2003–2007; Net 25)
- Aida G. Daily (2016–2020; Inquirer 990 Television)
- Aksyon (2010–2020; TV5, 2011–2019; AksyonTV, 2019–2020; One PH)
  - Aksyon Alerts (2010–2020; TV5)
  - Aksyon Breaking (2011–2014; AksyonTV)
  - Aksyon JournalisMO (2010–2012; TV5, 2011–2012; AksyonTV)
  - Aksyon Linggo (2010–2012; TV5, 2011–2012; AksyonTV)
  - Aksyon Ngayon (2010; TV5)
  - Aksyon Sabado (2010–2012; TV5, 2011–2012; AksyonTV)
  - Aksyon sa Tanghali (2014–2020; TV5)
  - Aksyon sa Umaga (2014–2017; TV5/AksyonTV)
  - Aksyon Tonite (2014–2019; TV5/AksyonTV)
  - Aksyon Weather (2011–2014; AksyonTV)
  - Aksyon Weekend (2010; TV5, 2013–2014; TV5/AksyonTV)
- Aksyon Bisaya (2011–2016; TV5 Cebu)
- Aksyon Dabaw (2014–2016; TV5 Davao)
  - Aksyon Alerto Davao (2011–2014; TV5 Davao)
- Alam Mo Dapat! (2026–present; D8TV)
- Alas Singko Y Medya (1995–2002; ABS-CBN)
  - Alas Singko Y Medya Weekend (1999–2002; ABS-CBN)
- Ala-Una sa Balita (2025–2026; IBC/Congress TV/DWAN TV)
- Alerto Central Luzon (2013–2016; CLTV)
- All TV News Break (2024; All TV)
- All TV News: Mabilis Lang 'To! (2025–present; All TV, 2026–present; AllRadio TV)
- ANC Breaking News (2001–present; ANC)
- ANC Headlines (1999–2024, 2026–present; ANC)
- ANC News First (ANC)
- ANC Newsnight (ANC)
- ANC Presents (2007–present; ANC)
- ANC Rundown (2019–2024; ANC, 2020; DZMM TeleRadyo)
- Andar ng mga Balita (2011–2014; AksyonTV)
- Ang Balita Karon (ABC Davao)
- Ano Ang Balita (1962–1972; MBC)
- Apat na Sulok ng Daigdig (1967–1972; ABS-CBN)
- Arangkada (2007–2015; GMA Iloilo)
- Arangkada Balita (2013–2015; RHTV/DZRH News Television, 2014–2016; CLTV, 2023–2025; Aliw 23, 2024–2025; DWIZ News TV, 2025–2026; PRTV Prime Media)
- Arangkada sa Nuwebe Davao (RPN Davao)
- Arangkada sa Umaga (2016–2017; CLTV)
- Arangkada Ulat sa Tanghali (1999–2000; RPN)
- ASEAN in Focus (2014–2022; Net 25)
  - ASEAN in Focus Weekend (2017–2022; Net 25)
- Asintado... Ciento Por Ciento (2026–present; Aliw 23/DWIZ News TV)
- At Home with GMA Regional TV (2020–2024; GMA Regional TV Mindanao)
- Bagong Morning Kapamilya (2018–2020; ABS-CBN Dagupan/ABS-CBN Baguio)
- Bagong Pilipinas (2017–2020; PTV)
- Bagong Umaga, Bagong Balita (2012–2018; ABS-CBN Dagupan)
- Balita Alas Singko (2011–2019; AksyonTV, 2019–2020; One PH)
- Balita Alas Singko ng Umaga (2000–2001; ABS-CBN)
- Balita Alas Tres (2026; True TV)
- Balita AnteMano (2024–2025; TeleRadyo Serbisyo, 2024–present; Prime TV/PRTV Prime Media, 2025–present; DZMM TeleRadyo)
- Balita ng Bansa (2016–2023, 2023–2025; SMNI News Channel)
- Balita Ngayon (1966–1972, 1986–1987; ABS-CBN, 2020–2023; TeleRadyo)
- Balita Nuwebe Nobenta (2016–2020; Inquirer 990 Television)
- Balita Pilipinas Primetime (2011–2014; GMA News TV)
  - Balita Pilipinas Ngayon (2011–2019; GMA News TV)
- Balita Rewind (2016–2020; Inquirer 990 Television)
- Balita sa IBC (1986–1989; IBC)
  - Balita sa IBC: Huling Ulat (1986–1989; IBC)
- Balita sa Tanghali (1986–1989; IBC)
- Balitaan (2013–2014; PTV)
- Balitaan at Kamustaan (2022–2023; IZTV)
- Balitaang Tapat (2010–2012; TV5, 2011–2012; AksyonTV)
- Balitalakayan (2021–2022; Net 25)
- Balitambayan (2023–2025; Aliw 23, 2024–2025; DWIZ News TV)
- Balitang 60 (2011–2014; AksyonTV)
- Balitang 882 (2022–2023; IZTV)
- Balitang A2Z (2021–present; A2Z, 2025–present; Light TV)
- Balitang Amianan (2008–2014, 2016–2022; GMA Dagupan)
- Balitang America (2002–2021; ANC)
- Balitang Balita (1992–2004; ABC)
- Balitang Bayan Alas 5ingko (2025–2026; Radyo Pilipinas 1 Television)
- Balitang Bicolandia (2021–2024; GMA Bicol)
- Balitang Bisdak (1999–2014, 2016–present; GMA Cebu)
- Balitang Canada (2012–2015; ANC)
- Balitang Central Luzon (2013–2016, 2018–2020; CLTV)
  - Balitang Central Luzon Update (CLTV)
- Balitang Ilokano (2012–2014; GMA Laoag)
- Balitang Konektodo (2025–present; DWAN TV)
- Balitang Paliparan (2022–2023; IZTV, 2023–2026; Aliw 23, 2024–2026; DWIZ News TV)
- Balitang Pambansa (2024–2025; PTV/IBC/Radyo Pilipinas 1 Television)
- Balitang Promdi (2017–present; DZRH News Television/DZRH TV)
- Balitang Southern Tagalog (2022–2024; GMA Southern Tagalog)
- Balitang Tanghali (2019–2024; DZRJ RadioVision/Radyo Bandido TV)
- Balitanghali (2005–present; QTV/Q/GMA News TV/GTV, 2022–2023; Heart of Asia/I Heart Movies, 2023–2024; Pinoy Hits)
  - Balitanghali Weekend (2010–2020; Q/GMA News TV)
  - Balita Ko (2023; GTV/Heart of Asia/I Heart Movies/Pinoy Hits)
- Balita Pa More! (2026–present; DWAN TV)
- Bandila (2006–2020; ABS-CBN, 2007–2011, 2017–2019; DZMM TeleRadyo, 2006–2014; ANC)
- Bangon Bayan with Mon (2023–2024; One PH, 2024; True FM TV)
- Bangon na, Bayan! (2023–2024; GTV)
- Bangon na, Pilipinas! (2019–present; Light TV)
- Banner Story (2016–2020; Inquirer 990 Television)
  - Banner Story: Evening Edition (2016–2020; Inquirer 990 Television)
  - Banner Story: Late-Night Edition (Inquirer 990 Television)
- Baretang Bikol (2012–2014; GMA Naga)
- Basis Points (2024−2025; Bilyonaryo News Channel)
- Batingaw (2008–2010; NBN)
- Beautiful Day (2025; Bilyonaryo News Channel)
- Big@10 (2017–2018; CLTV)
- Big News (2004–2008; ABC)
  - The Big News (1962–1972, 1992–2004; ABC)
- Bigtime Balita (2020; GMA News TV)
- Bilis Balita (2011–2014; Studio 23)
- Boom Balita (2007–2013, 2024–present; TV Natin/RHTV/DZRH News Television/DZRH TV)
- Boses ng Balita (2020; GMA News TV)
- Breakfast (1999–2007; Studio 23, 1999–2001; ANC)
- Breaking News (2014–2015; Solar News Channel/9TV)
- Brigada (2011–2024; GMA News TV/GTV, 2023–2024; Pinoy Hits)
- Brigada Balita Nationwide (2013–present; Brigada News TV-34/Brigada TV)
  - Brigada Balita Nationwide sa Hapon (2013–2024; Brigada TV)
  - Brigada Balita Nationwide sa Tanghali (2013–present; Brigada TV)
  - Brigada Balita Nationwide sa Umaga (2013–present; Brigada TV)
  - DriveMax Brigada Balita Nationwide (2024–present; Brigada TV)
- Brigada Top Stories (2012–2020; Brigada News TV-34)
- Buena Mano Balita (2007–2015; GMA Cebu)
- Buena Manong Balita (2019–2021, 2024–present; GMA News TV/GTV)
- Buenos Días Zamboanga (2019–2020; ABS-CBN Zamboanga)
- Bulletin News (RBS)
- Busina Balita (2019–2020; CNN Philippines)
- Business @ 10 (2007–2008; NBN)
- Business 360 (2024–present; Bilyonaryo News Channel)
- Business Brief (2025–2026; Bilyonaryo News Channel)
- Business News (2002–2003; NBN)
- Business Nightly (2000–2020; ANC)
  - Business Outlook (2023–present; ANC)
  - Business Roadshow (2023–2024; ANC)
- BusinessWorld Live (2018–2023; One News)
- Cebuano News (2013–2017; Solar News Channel/9TV/CNN Philippines)
- Chinese News TV (CNTV) (2017–2019; Net 25, 2019–2020; IBC)
  - Chinatown News TV (2021; ANC)
- Chronicle News (ABS-CBN)
- Citynet Television News (1995–1999; Citynet Television)
  - Citynet Evening News (1995–1999; Citynet Television)
  - Citynet Late-Night News (1995–1999; Citynet Television)
  - Citynet Morning News (1995–1999; Citynet Television)
  - Citynet Noontime/Afternoon News (1995–1999; Citynet Television)
  - Citynet Weekend News (1995–1999; Citynet Television)
- CLTV36 Balitaan (2007–2013, 2021–present; CLTV)
  - CLTV36 Balitaan sa Umaga (2011–2013; CLTV)
  - CLTV36 Flash Report (2017–present; CLTV)
  - CLTV36 News (2021–present; CLTV)
- Central Luzon Ngayon (2018; CLTV)
  - Central Luzon Ngayon Recap (2018; CLTV)
  - Central Luzon Tonight (2018; CLTV)
- CNN Konek (2011–2013; AksyonTV)
- CNN Philippines Breaking News (2015–2024; CNN Philippines)
- CNN Philippines Network News (2015–2017; CNN Philippines)
  - CNN Philippines Balitaan (2016–2024; CNN Philippines)
  - CNN Philippines Headline News (2015–2016; CNN Philippines)
  - CNN Philippines Nightly News (2015–2017; CNN Philippines)
  - CNN Philippines Updates (2015–2024; CNN Philippines)
- Congress News (2025–present; IBC/Congress TV)
- Congressional Reports (1961–1962; PBS)
- CTN Midnite (1997–1998; IBC)
- D8TV News: Balitang Balita (2025; D8TV)
  - D8TV News Alert (2025–present; D8TV)
- D8 Patrol (2026–present; D8TV)
- Daily Info (2017–2020; PTV)
- Davao Express Balita (2002–2003; IBC Davao)
- Daybreak (2012–2015; Solar News Channel/9TV)
- Dateline Philippines (1996–present; SNN/ANC, 2020; DZMM TeleRadyo)
  - Dateline Philippines Saturday (1996–2020, 2023–2024; SNN/ANC)
  - Dateline Philippines Sunday (1996–2020; SNN/ANC)
- Dobol B sa News TV (2011–2012, 2017–2021; GMA News TV)
  - Dobol A sa Dobol B (2017–2020; GMA News TV)
  - Dobol B TV (2021–present; GTV, 2023–2024; Pinoy Hits)
  - Dobol B: Bantay Balita sa Kamara (2019–2020; GMA News TV)
  - Dobol B: Bantay Balita sa Senado (2019–2020; GMA News TV)
  - Dobol Weng sa Dobol B (2022–present; GTV, 2023–2024; Pinoy Hits)
- Dos por Dos (2007–2020; DZMM TeleRadyo, 2020; ANC/TeleRadyo, 2020–2021; DZRH News Television, 2021–present; DZRH TV)
- DWAN 1206 News Alert (2024–2026; DWAN TV)
- DWIZ Network News (2024–present; Aliw 23/DWIZ News TV)
  - DWIZ Network News: Evening Edition (2026–present; Aliw 23/DWIZ News TV)
  - DWIZ Network News: Midday Edition (2026–present; Aliw 23/DWIZ News TV)
  - DWIZ Newsfeed (2024; Aliw 23)
  - DWIZ News Catchup (2024–2026; Aliw 23/DWIZ News TV)
  - DWIZ NewsBreak (2026–present; Aliw 23/DWIZ News TV)
- DWIZ Reporter's Hour (2026–present; Aliw 23/DWIZ News TV)
- DWIZ Special Coverage (2022–2023; IZTV, 2023–present; Aliw 23, 2024–present; DWIZ News TV)
- DWIZ Todo Balita (2026–present; Aliw 23/DWIZ News TV)
  - DWIZ Todo Balita Sabado (2026–present; Aliw 23/DWIZ News TV)
  - DWIZ Todo Balita Linggo (2026–present; Aliw 23/DWIZ News TV)
- DW News (2015–2022; Net 25)
- DZBB Executive Summary (2020–2021; GMA News TV/GTV)
- DZMM Balita Ngayon (2007–2020, 2025–present; DZMM TeleRadyo, 2025–present; PRTV Prime Media)
  - DZMM Breaking News (2007–2020; DZMM TeleRadyo)
  - DZMM Radyo Patrol Flash Report (2007–2020, 2025–present; DZMM TeleRadyo, 2025–present; PRTV Prime Media)
  - DZMM Special Coverage (2007–2020, 2025–present; DZMM TeleRadyo, 2025–present; PRTV Prime Media)
  - DZMM TeleRadyo Live (2007–2020; DZMM TeleRadyo)
- DZRH Balita (2007–2008; TV Natin)
  - DZRH Alas-Kuwarto Balita (2018–2019; DZRH News Television)
  - DZRH Balita Alas-Kwatro (2011; RHTV)
  - DZRH Balita Alas-Sais (2008–2011; RHTV)
  - DZRH Evening News (2019–2020; DZRH News Television)
  - DZRH Flash Report (2007–present; TV Natin/RHTV/DZRH News Television/DZRH TV)
  - DZRH Headline Balita (2007–2011; TV Natin/RHTV)
  - DZRH Headlines (2007–2011; TV Natin/RHTV)
  - DZRH Nationwide Balita (2008–2011; RHTV)
  - DZRH Network News (2018–2020; DZRH News Television)
  - DZRH Special Coverage (2007–present; TV Natin/RHTV/DZRH News Television/DZRH TV)
- Eagle News International (2011–2022; Net 25)
  - Eagle News Evening Edition (2011–2013; Net 25)
  - Eagle News International Filipino Edition (2018–2021; Net 25)
  - Eagle News Morning Edition (2011–2013; Net 25)
  - Eagle News Update (2011–2022; Net 25)
  - Eagle News Weekend Edition (2011–2012; Net 25)
- Early All Ready (2011–2019; AksyonTV, 2019–2020; One PH)
- Early Edition (2017–2020; ANC, 2020; ABS-CBN/DZMM TeleRadyo/S+A)
- Early Evening Report (1986–1987; PTV)
- Early Late-Night Report (1986–1987; PTV)
- Easo World News (1962–1967; IBC)
- Eight o' Clock Newsbreak (1991–1995; Islands TV 13/IBC)
- Executive Session (2014–present; DZRH News Television/DZRH TV)
- Fast Break (2014–2017; S+A)
- Fast Evening (GNN)
- Fast Morning (GNN/One Media)
- Fastbreak News (2010–2012; UNTV)
- Final Edition News (1969–1971; IBC)
- Flash Report (2002–2016; GMA)
  - Flash Report: Special Edition (2002–2007; GMA)
- Flash Report sa QTV (2005–2007; QTV)
  - Flash Report sa Q (2007; Q)
- For Tonight Only (2016–2025; DZRH News Television/DZRH TV)
- Foreign News (1961–1962; PBS)
- Frontline Pilipinas (2020–present; TV5/One PH, 2024–present; RPTV/True TV, 2024; True FM TV, 2025–present; Kapatid Channel)
  - Frontline Express (2024–present; TV5/RPTV)
  - Frontline Express AM (2025–present; TV5/RPTV/Kapatid Channel)
  - Frontline Pilipinas Weekend (2023–present; TV5, 2024–present; One PH/RPTV/True TV, 2024; True FM TV, 2026–present; Kapatid Channel)
  - Frontline sa Umaga (2021–2023, 2024, 2026–present; TV5, 2024, 2026–present; RPTV, 2026–present; Kapatid Channel, 2023–2024, 2025–2026; TV5/RPTV/Kapatid Channel's Gud Morning Kapatid)
  - Frontline sa Umaga Express (2024; TV5's Gud Morning Kapatid)
  - Frontline Tonight (2021–present; TV5, 2024–present; RPTV)
- Frontpage: Ulat ni Mel Tiangco (1999–2004; GMA)
- Garantisadong Balita (2013–2020; DZMM TeleRadyo, 2020; ANC/TeleRadyo)
- Gising, Pilipinas! (2007–2020, 2025–present; DZMM TeleRadyo, 2008–2012; ABS-CBN, 2020; Kapamilya Channel/TeleRadyo, 2023–2025; TeleRadyo Serbisyo, 2024–present; Prime TV/PRTV Prime Media)
- Global Conversations (2015–2016; CNN Philippines)
- Global News (1998–2003; ABS-CBN)
- Global Round-up (2023–present; PTV)
- GMA Balita (1986–1998; GMA)
- GMA Breaking News (2004–2018; GMA)
- GMA Evening Report (1974–1976; GMA)
- GMA Headline News (1986–1992; GMA)
- GMA Integrated News Bulletin (2023–2026; GMA/GTV, 2023; Heart of Asia/I Heart Movies, 2023–2024; Pinoy Hits)
- GMA Network News (1992–2002; GMA)
- GMA News Bulletin (2026–present; GMA/GTV)
- GMA News Digest (1976–1987; GMA)
- GMA News Live (1987–2002; GMA)
- GMA News Roundup (1974–1976; GMA)
- GMA News Update (2016–2018; GMA)
- GMA Regional TV Early Edition (2020–2024; GMA Regional TV Western Visayas)
- GMA Regional TV Live! (2020–2024; GMA Regional TV Central Visayas)
- GMA Regional TV Weekend News (2019–2021; GMA News TV, 2020; GMA)
- GMA Saturday/Sunday Report (1986–1989; GMA)
- GMA Weekend Report (2007–2010; GMA)
- GNN Evening Report (GNN)
- GNN Newsbreak (GNN)
- GNN News Update (GNN)
- Good Morning, Bayan! (2024–2026; True FM TV/True TV)
- Good Morning Boss (2013–2016; PTV)
- Good Morning Club (2012–2014; TV5/AksyonTV)
- Good Morning Inquirer (2016–2020; Inquirer 990 Television)
- Good Morning Kuya (2007–present; UNTV)
- Good Morning Manila (1980–1986; MBS)
- Good Morning Pilipinas (2000–2001, 2016–2017; PTV)
- Good Morning, Ser! (2014; TV5/AksyonTV)
- Gud Morning Kapatid (2023–2026; TV5, 2024–2026; RPTV, 2025–2026; Kapatid Channel)
- Happening Now (2016–2024; CNN Philippines)
- Hataw Balita (2005–2013, 2016–2017; UNTV)
  - Hataw Balita News Update (2007–2012; UNTV)
  - Hataw Balita Newsbreak (2012–2016; UNTV)
  - Hataw Balita Ngayon (2024–present; UNTV)
  - Hataw Balita Pilipinas (2020–2024; UNTV)
  - Hataw Balita Primetime (2007; UNTV)
- Hataw Na... Umaga Na! (2026–present; Aliw 23/DWIZ News TV)
- Headline Ngayon (2023–2025; TeleRadyo Serbisyo, 2024–present; Prime TV/PRTV Prime Media, 2025–present; DZMM TeleRadyo)
  - Headline Ngayon Express (2023; TeleRadyo Serbisyo)
  - Headline Ngayon Weekend (2023–2025; TeleRadyo Serbisyo, 2024–2025; Prime TV/PRTV Prime Media, 2025; DZMM TeleRadyo)
- Headline Pilipinas (2016–2020; DZMM TeleRadyo, 2020; ANC, 2020–2023; TeleRadyo)
  - Headline Pilipinas Weekend (2020; DZMM TeleRadyo/ANC, 2020–2021; TeleRadyo)
- Headline Trese (1989–1990, 1997; IBC, 1990–1992; Islands TV 13)
- Headline sa Hapon (2024–2025; TeleRadyo Serbisyo, 2024–present; Prime TV/PRTV Prime Media, 2025–present; DZMM TeleRadyo)
- Headlines Ngayon (2017–2020; Inquirer 990 Television)
- Himig at Balita (2026; Aliw 23/DWIZ News TV)
- HOD: Headlines of the Day (2023–2024; TeleRadyo Serbisyo, 2024; Prime TV)
- i-Balita (2007–2011; Net 25)
  - i-News (2007–2011; Net 25)
  - i-Balita Update (2010–2011; Net 25)
  - i-Balita Weekend Report (2011; Net 25)
  - i-Balita Online (2011–2013; Net 25)
- Iba-Balita (2010–2014; Studio 23)
  - Iba-Balita Ngayon (2011–2012; Studio 23)
- IBC Balita Ngayon (1998–2000; IBC)
- IBC Evening Report (1970–1972; IBC)
- IBC Express Balita (1998–2011, 2022–2026; IBC)
- IBC Headliners (1994–2011, 2021; IBC)
- IBC News 5 O'Clock Report (1992; Islands TV 13)
  - IBC News 5:30 Report (1992–1995; Islands TV 13/IBC)
  - IBC News 5:30 Report Cebu (1992–1995; IBC Cebu)
  - IBC News 11 O'Clock Report (1992–1995; Islands TV 13/IBC)
- IBC News Tonight (2002–2011; IBC)
  - IBC News Tonight Cebuano Edition (2002–2003; IBC Cebu)
  - IBC News Tonight Karon Cebu (2003–2011; IBC Cebu)
- IBC NewsBreak (1992–1994, 2014–2018; IBC)
- IBC Newsday (1975–1986; IBC)
- IBC Special Report (2022–2024; IBC)
- IBC TV X-Press (1995–1997; IBC)
  - IBC TV X-Press Cebu (1995; IBC Cebu)
  - IBC TV X-Press Karon (1995–1996; IBC Cebu)
- IM Ready sa Dobol B (2019–2021; GMA News TV/GTV)
- In Case You Missed It (2018–2020; CNN Philippines)
- In the Limelight (2011; GMA News TV)
- Inquirer Breakfast Club (2016–2020; Inquirer 990 Television)
- Insider Exclusive Kapihan (2018–2020; RJ DigiTV)
- International News Report (1972–1976; IBC)
- Isyu Spotted (2023–2025; TeleRadyo Serbisyo, 2024–2025, 2026–present; Prime TV/PRTV Prime Media, 2025–present; DZMM TeleRadyo)
- It's a Beautiful Day! (2024–2025; Bilyonaryo News Channel)
- Ito Ang Balita (1998–2001; RJTV, 2001–2004; SBN, 2004–2005, 2007–present; UNTV)
  - Ito Ang Balita Weekend Edition (2020–2026; UNTV)
- Ito ang Radyo Patrol (2007–2020; DZMM TeleRadyo)
- IZ Balita (2023–2026; Aliw 23, 2024–2026; DWIZ News TV)
  - IZ Balita Linggo (2023–2026; Aliw 23, 2024–2026; DWIZ News TV)
  - IZ Balita Sabado (2023–2026; Aliw 23, 2024–2026; DWIZ News TV)
- IZ Balita Nationwide (2022–2023; IZTV)
  - IZ Balita Nationwide sa Hapon (2022–2023; IZTV)
  - IZ Balita Nationwide sa Tanghali (2022–2023; IZTV)
  - IZ Balita Nationwide sa Umaga (2022–2023; IZTV)
  - IZ Balita Nationwide Linggo (2022–2023; IZTV)
  - IZ Balita Nationwide Sabado (2022–2023; IZTV)
  - IZ Umaga Balita (2023; Aliw 23)
- Junior Patrol (1990–1992; ABS-CBN)
- Kabayan (2010, 2020; ABS-CBN, 2010–2020, 2025–present; DZMM TeleRadyo, 2020; ANC, 2020–2023; Kapamilya Channel/TeleRadyo, 2023–2025; TeleRadyo Serbisyo, 2024–present; Prime TV/PRTV Prime Media)
- Kangrunaan a Damag (2018–present; PTV Cordillera, 2025–present; PTV)
- Kapampangan News (2014–2017; Solar News Channel/9TV/CNN Philippines)
- Kape at Balita (1991–1995; GMA, 2012–2013; GMA News TV)
- Kaserbisyo Balita (2024–2025; TeleRadyo Serbisyo/Prime TV/PRTV Prime Media)
  - Kaserbisyo Flash Report (2024–2025; TeleRadyo Serbisyo/Prime TV/PRTV Prime Media)
  - Kaserbisyo Special Coverage (2024–2025; TeleRadyo Serbisyo/Prime TV/PRTV Prime Media)
- Live on Q (2007–2011; Q)
- Liwanag sa Balita (2019–2020; GMA News TV)
- Local News (1961–1962; PBS)
- Maayong Buntag Kapamilya (2005–2020; ABS-CBN Cebu)
  - Maayong Buntag Kapamilya Sabado (ABS-CBN Cebu)
- Maayong Buntag Mindanao (1993–2020; ABS-CBN Davao)
  - Maayong Buntag Mindanao Sabado (ABS-CBN Davao)
- Magandang Umaga, Bayan (2002–2005; ABS-CBN)
- Magandang Umaga, Bayan Weekend (2002–2004; ABS-CBN)
- Magandang Umaga, Pilipinas (2005–2007; ABS-CBN, 2011–present, RHTV/DZRH News Television/DZRH TV)
- Magandang Umaga, Pilipinas Sabado (2012–2014; RHTV/DZRH News Television)
- Magandang Umaga Po (1988–1995; ABS-CBN)
- Magandang Umaga Socsksargen (2006–2010; ABS-CBN General Santos)
- Magandang Umaga South Central Mindanao (2010–2020; ABS-CBN General Santos)
  - Magandang Umaga South Central Mindanao Sabado (ABS-CBN General Santos)
- Malacañang: The Week that Was (2008–2010; NBN)
- Masayang Umaga Po! (2015–2017; Net 25)
- Marhay na Aga Kapamilya (2008–2020; ABS-CBN Naga)
- Market Edge (2015–present; ANC, 2020; DZMM TeleRadyo/S+A)
- Mata ng Agila (2011–present; Net 25)
  - Mata ng Agila International (2022–present; Net 25)
  - Mata ng Agila Primetime (2011–present; Net 25)
  - Mata ng Agila sa Tanghali (2023–present; Net 25)
  - Mata ng Agila Weekend (2012–present; Net 25)
- Matters of Fact (2017–2020, 2020–2021; ANC, 2020; DZMM TeleRadyo/S+A)
- Maupay nga Aga Kapamilya (2020; ABS-CBN Tacloban)
- May Tamang Balita (2011–2013; GMA News TV)
- MBC Network News (2013–2018, 2020–2024; DZRH News Television/DZRH TV)
  - MBC TV Network News (2024–present; DZRH TV)
- Meet the Press on Air (2023–present; Radyo Pilipinas 1 Television)
- Mega Balita Linggo (2021–present; DZRH News Television/DZRH TV)
- Melo del Prado sa Super Radyo DZBB (2019–present; GMA News TV/GTV, 2020; GMA)
- Metro Central Luzon Ngayon (2016–2018; CLTV)
  - Metro Central Luzon Tonite (2016–2017; CLTV)
  - Metro Central Luzon Update (2016–2017; CLTV)
  - Metro Central Luzon Weekend Recap (2017–2018; CLTV)
- Metro Manila Ngayon (2016, 2021–2022; DZRH News Television/DZRH TV)
- Metro Morning (2026–present; Bilyonaryo News Channel)
- Metro One (2012–2013; PTV)
- Mga Balitang Bayan (1973–1975; IBC)
- Mga Tampok na Balita (ABS-CBN)
- Midday Report (2026–present; Bilyonaryo News Channel)
- Midnight Update (1987–1989; PTV)
- Minuto (2007–2010; NBN)
- MMDA sa GMA (2019–2020; GMA News TV)
- MoJo: Mukha ng Balita (2024–present; One PH)
- Money Matters (2008–2010; NBN)
- Morning Headlines (1962–1964; IBC)
- Morning Matters (2025–present; One News)
- Morning Report (1970–1972; IBC)
- Mornings @ ANC (2006–2017; ANC)
- Mornings @ GMA (1998–1999; GMA)
- Mornings @ PTV (1999–2000; PTV)
- Mornings with GMA Regional TV (2020–2024; GMA Regional TV North Central Luzon)
- Nagseserbisyo, Niña Corpuz (2024–2025; TeleRadyo Serbisyo, 2024–present; Prime TV/PRTV Prime Media, 2025–present; DZMM TeleRadyo)
- Naimbag Nga Morning Kapamilya (2008–2018; ABS-CBN Baguio)
- National Network News (1998–2001; PTV)
- National Television News (1964–1967; IBC)
- NBN Network News (2001–2005; NBN)
  - NBN Business (2005–2006; NBN)
  - NBN News Live (2001–2007; NBN)
  - NBN Special Coverage (2001–2011; NBN)
- Nescafé Morning News (sponsored by Nescafé) (1987–1989; ABS-CBN)
- Net 25 News Update (2011–present; Net 25)
  - Net 25 Report (2001–2008; Net 25)
  - Net 25 World News (2024–2025; Net 25)
- Network News (2014–2015; Solar News Channel/9TV)
- New Day (2016–2024; CNN Philippines)
- New Day @ NBN (2001–2002; NBN)
- New Day @ PTV (2001; PTV)
- News5 Alerts (2020–present; TV5)
- News 23 (1996–1998; Studio 23)
- News @ 1 (2012–2016; PTV)
- News @ 6 (2012–2016; PTV)
  - News @ 1: Junior Edition (2013–2014; PTV)
  - News @ 1: The Week that Was (2013–2014; PTV)
  - News @ 6: Saturday Edition (2014–2016; PTV)
- News at Seven (1976–1986; GMA)
- News & Views (2025–2026; One News)
- News and Views with Abel Cruz (2009–2011; IBC)
- Newsbeat (2004–2007; Net 25)
- Newsblast (2016–2023, 2023–present; SMNI/SMNI News Channel)
- Newsbreak (1967–1972; ABS-CBN)
- Newsbreak Bilingual (1995–1998; PTV)
- News Central (1998–2010; Studio 23)
- NewsCenter 4 (1980–1986; MBS)
  - Newscenter 3: Cebu (1980–1986; MBS)
  - Newscenter 4: Bacolod (1980–1986; MBS)
  - Newscenter 4: Evening Edition (1980–1986; MBS)
  - Newscenter 4: Final Edition (1980–1986; MBS)
  - Newscenter 4: Morning Edition (1980–1986; MBS)
  - Newscenter 4: Noon Edition in Filipino (1980–1986; MBS)
- Newscoop (2023–2026; Aliw 23, 2024–2026; DWIZ News TV)
  - Newscoop Weekend (2025–2026; DWIZ News TV)
- Newsday (2012–2015; Solar News Channel/9TV)
- Newsday Bicol (1982–1990; IBC Naga)
- Newsday Cebu (1982–1990; IBC Cebu)
- Newsday Davao (1982–1990; IBC Davao)
- NewsFeed (2024–present; Bilyonaryo News Channel)
  - NewsFeed @ 11 am (2026–present; Bilyonaryo News Channel)
  - NewsFeed @ 11:50 am (2026–present; Bilyonaryo News Channel)
  - NewsFeed @ Noon (2024–2025; Bilyonaryo News Channel)
  - NewsFeed @ 2 pm (2024–present; Bilyonaryo News Channel)
  - NewsFeed @ 3 pm (2026–present; Bilyonaryo News Channel)
  - NewsFeed @ 4 pm (2024–present; Bilyonaryo News Channel)
  - NewsFeed @ 5 pm (2026–present; Bilyonaryo News Channel)
  - NewsFeed @ 6 pm (2024; Bilyonaryo News Channel)
  - NewsFeed Business (2025; Bilyonaryo News Channel)
  - NewsFeed Weekend @ 12 nn (2024–present; Bilyonaryo News Channel)
  - NewsFeed Weekend @ 1 pm (2026–present; Bilyonaryo News Channel)
  - NewsFeed Weekend @ 2 pm (2024–present; Bilyonaryo News Channel)
  - NewsFeed Weekend @ 3 pm (2026–present; Bilyonaryo News Channel)
  - NewsFeed Weekend @ 4 pm (2024–present; Bilyonaryo News Channel)
  - World NewsFeed (2024; Bilyonaryo News Channel)
- News Flash sa 4 (1998–2001; PTV)
- Newsforce (GNN/One Media/Golden Nation Network)
  - Newsforce Update (GNN)
  - Newsforce Weekend (GNN)
- News Light (2011–2019, 2023–present; Light TV)
  - News Light sa Umaga (2019–2023; Light TV)
- NewsLife (2012–2016; PTV)
- Newsline Mindanao (2006–2010; SMNI)
- Newsline World (2011–2023, 2023–present; SMNI/SMNI News Channel)
- News Night (2015–2024; CNN Philippines, 2022–2023; All TV)
- News Now (2012–2019; ANC)
- News of the Week in Review (IBC)
- News on 4 (1987–1995; PTV)
- News on 7 (GMA Davao)
- News on Q (2005–2011; QTV/Q)
- News Patrol (2005–2020; ABS-CBN, 2020; TeleRadyo, 2020–present; Kapamilya Channel, 2022–present; A2Z, 2023; Jeepney TV, 2024–2026; ANC, 2026–present; All TV)
  - News Patrol Bicol (ABS-CBN Naga)
  - News Patrol Central Visayas (ABS-CBN Cebu)
  - News Patrol Chavacano (ABS-CBN Zamboanga)
  - News Patrol Davao (ABS-CBN Davao)
  - News Patrol Eastern Visayas (ABS-CBN Tacloban)
  - News Patrol Kapampangan (2018–2019; ABS-CBN Pampanga)
  - News Patrol Negros (ABS-CBN Bacolod)
  - News Patrol North Luzon (ABS-CBN Baguio)
  - News Patrol North Mindanao (ABS-CBN Cagayan de Oro)
  - News Patrol Palawan (ABS-CBN Palawan)
  - News Patrol Panay (ABS-CBN Iloilo)
  - News Patrol Southern Mindanao (ABS-CBN Davao)
  - News Patrol Southern Tagalog (ABS-CBN Batangas)
  - News Patrol South Central Mindanao (ABS-CBN General Santos)
- News.PH Kasama si Pia Hontiveros (2012–2015; Solar News Channel/9TV, 2015–2017, 2020–2022; CNN Philippines)
- News plus (2014; S+A)
- (CNN Philippines) Newsroom (2015–2016; CNN Philippines)
  - Global Newsroom (2016–2017; CNN Philippines)
  - Newsroom @ 8 am (2015–2020; CNN Philippines)
  - Newsroom @ 9 pm (2016–2020; CNN Philippines)
  - Newsroom Junior Edition (2018–2020; CNN Philippines)
  - Newsroom Ngayon (2017–2024; CNN Philippines)
  - Newsroom Weekend @ 12 nn/9 am (Sat)/10 am (Sun) (2017–2020; CNN Philippines)
  - Newsroom Weekend @ 6 pm (2017–2024; CNN Philippines)
- News Team 13 (2011–2019; IBC)
  - News Team 13: Afternoon Edition (2011–2019; IBC)
  - News Team 13: Evening Edition (2011–2015; IBC)
- News to Go (2011–2019; GMA News TV)
- News Today (1974–1980; GTV)
  - News Today: Evening Edition (1974–1980; GTV)
  - News Today: Final Edition (1974–1980; GTV)
  - News Today: Morning Edition (1974–1980; GTV)
  - News Today: Noon Edition in Filipino (1974–1980; GTV)
- News Trends (ABS-CBN)
- News TV Live (2011–2021; GMA News TV)
  - News Live (2021–2023; GTV)
- News TV Quick Response Team (2011–2021; GMA News TV)
- NewsWatch Live (2024–present; Aliw 23)
  - NewsWatch Now (2024–2026; Aliw 23)
  - NewsWatch Plus Conversations (2024; Aliw 23)
- Nightly News (2012–2014; 9TV)
- Nuebe Patrol (produced by MIT-RTVN, Inc.) (2009–2014; ABS-CBN Pagadian)
- Nueve Noventa Report (2016–2020; Inquirer 990 Television)
- Omaga-Diaz Report (2014–2020; DZMM TeleRadyo, 2020–2021; TeleRadyo)
- Omaga-Diaz Reports (2021–2023; TeleRadyo)
- On the Spot (2017–2020; DZMM TeleRadyo, 2020–2023; TeleRadyo)
- One Balita Pilipinas (2019–2020; TV5, 2019–present; One PH, 2021–present; One News, 2026–present; True TV)
  - One Balita Bai (2024–present; One PH/True TV, 2024; True FM TV)
  - One Balita Ngayon (2021–2023; One PH)
  - One Balita Weekend (2022–2023; One PH/One News)
- One North Central Luzon (2022–present; GMA Regional TV North Central Luzon)
- One Mindanao (2017–present; GMA Regional TV Mindanao)
- One News Now (2018–2023, 2024–present; One News)
  - One NewsFeed (2026–present; One News)
  - One News World (2019–2020; One News)
  - One Newsroom (2019–2020; One News)
  - One News Now: Business (2023; One News)
  - One News Now: Markets (2023; One News)
  - One News Now: World (2023; One News)
- One Western Visayas (2018–2026; GMA Regional TV Western Visayas)
- PAGASA I-Weather (2012; PTV)
- Palawan TV Patrol (1997–2006; ABS-CBN Palawan)
- Pamahaw Espesyal (2008–2020; ABS-CBN Cagayan de Oro)
- Pambansang Almusal (2011–2021, Net 25)
- Pambansang Balita Ala-Una (1998–2001; PTV)
- Pambansang Balita Ala-Sais (1998–2001; PTV)
- Panay Sikat (2018–2020; ABS-CBN Iloilo)
  - Panay Sikat Sabado (ABS-CBN Iloilo)
- Pangunahing Balita (1962–1972; ABC, 1987–1998; PTV)
- Pangunahing Balita (2008–2022; RHTV/DZRH News Television/DZRH TV)
- Pangunahing Balita Ala-Una (1986–1998; PTV)
- Parada Balita Linggo (2011–2012; RHTV)
- Pasada Ala-Una (2016–2017; CLTV)
- Pasada Balita (2017–2018; CLTV, 2023, 2024–2026; Aliw 23, 2024–2026; DWIZ News TV, 2024–2025; TV5/RPTV's Gud Morning Kapatid, 2026–present; DZMM TeleRadyo)
- PBS Final (1961–1962; PBS)
- PBS News Now (2023–2024; Radyo Pilipinas 1 Television)
- Philippine Headline News (1992–2007; World TV/SBN)
- Pilipinas, Gising Ka Na Ba? (2005–2007; UNTV)
- Pilipinas News (2012–2014; TV5/AksyonTV)
  - Pilipinas News Weekend (2012–2014; TV5/AksyonTV)
- Pinoy Gising! (2023–2026; Aliw 23, 2024–2026; DWIZ News TV)
- Pintig Balita (2007–2020; DZMM TeleRadyo)
- Primera Balita (2009–2015; GMA Dagupan)
- PNA Newsroom (2017–2022; PTV/IBC)
- Politiko Nightly (2025–present; Bilyonaryo News Channel, 2025–2026; Abante TV)
- Prime News (2006–2013; ANC)
  - Prime News Weekend (2006–2013; ANC)
- Primetime Balita (2000–2001; RPN)
- Primetime Balita sa Hapon (2016–2020; Inquirer 990 Television)
- Primetime on ANC (2011–2015; ANC)
  - Primetime on ANC Weekend (2013–2015; ANC)
- PRTV News Break (2025–present; PRTV Prime Media)
- PTV Balita Ngayon (2020–present; PTV)
  - PTV Balita Ngayon sa Probinsya: Cordillera (2023–present; PTV)
  - PTV Balita Ngayon sa Probinsya: Mindanao (2023–present; PTV)
- PTV Balitang Kapampangan (2024–present; PTV)
- PTV Newsbreak (1989–1998, 2012–2020; PTV)
- PTV News (1995–1998, 2016–2017, 2017–2020; PTV)
  - PTV News Bacolod (1995–1998; PTV Bacolod)
  - PTV News Cebu (1995–1998; PTV Cebu)
  - PTV News Headlines (2017–2020; PTV)
  - PTV News Mindanao (2017–present; PTV Davao, 2025–present; PTV)
  - PTV News Nationwide (1995–1997; PTV)
  - PTV News Now (2023–present; PTV)
  - PTV News Tonight (2020–present; PTV)
  - PTV Weekend Report (1987–1994; PTV)
- Public Briefing: #LagingHandaPH (2020–2023; PTV/DZRH News Television/DZRH TV, 2020, 2022–2023; IBC, 2020–2021; CNN Philippines, 2020–2022; One PH, 2020; TeleRadyo/ANC/GMA News TV, 2023; Radyo Pilipinas 1 Television)
- Pulso: Aksyon Balita (1999–2000; ABS-CBN)
- RadioVizion 33 (2008–2011; ZOE TV)
- Radyo Bandido Balita (2022–2024; Radyo Bandido TV)
- Radyo Inquirer Balita (2016–2020; Inquirer 990 Television)
  - Radyo Inquirer Balita sa Umaga (2016–2020; Inquirer 990 Television)
  - Radyo Inquirer Balita sa Tanghali (2016–2020; Inquirer 990 Television)
  - Radyo Inquirer Balita sa Hapon (2016–2020; Inquirer 990 Television)
  - Radyo Inquirer Balita sa Gabi (2016–2020; Inquirer 990 Television)
  - Radyo Inquirer News Update (2016–2020; Inquirer 990 Television)
- Radyo Patrol Balita (2007–2020; DZMM TeleRadyo)
  - Radyo Patrol Balita Alas-Dose (2007–2019; DZMM TeleRadyo)
  - Radyo Patrol Balita Alas-Dose Weekend (2007–2020; DZMM TeleRadyo)
  - Radyo Patrol Balita Alas-Kwatro (2007–2017, 2025–present; DZMM TeleRadyo)
  - Radyo Patrol Balita Alas-Kwatro Weekend (2007–2020; DZMM TeleRadyo)
  - Radyo Patrol Balita Alas-Siyete (2007–2020, 2025–present; DZMM TeleRadyo, 2010–2011; Studio 23, 2020; ABS-CBN/Kapamilya Channel/TeleRadyo, 2025–present; PRTV Prime Media)
  - Radyo Patrol Balita Alas-Siyete Weekend (2007–2020, 2025–present; DZMM TeleRadyo, 2025–present; PRTV Prime Media)
  - Radyo Patrol Balita Linggo (2011–2018; DZMM TeleRadyo)
- Radyo Pilipinas News Nationwide (2023–present; Radyo Pilipinas 1 Television)
  - Radyo Pilipinas Live (2023–2024, 2026; Radyo Pilipinas 1 Television)
  - Radyo Pilipinas News Update (2023–present; Radyo Pilipinas 1 Television)
  - Radyo Pilipinas Special Coverage (2023–present; Radyo Pilipinas 1 Television)
- Radyo5 Network News (2020–2021; TV5, 2020–2023; One PH)
  - Radyo5 Balita Pilipinas (2023; One PH, 2024; True FM TV)
  - Radyo5 News Update (2024; True FM TV)
- Radyo 630 Balita (2024–2025; TeleRadyo Serbisyo)
- RadyoBisyon (2014–2017; PTV/IBC)
- Ratsada (1999–2014; GMA Iloilo)
- Ratsada 24 Oras (2015; GMA Iloilo)
- Ratsada Balita (2026–present; GMA Iloilo)
- Ratsada sa Umaga (2022–2023; IZTV)
- Raz-tsada (2025; TeleRadyo Serbisyo/PRTV Prime Media)
- RBS Evening Report (RBS)
- RBS Morning Newscast (RBS)
- Regional TV Weekend News (2021; GTV)
  - Regional TV News (2021–2024; GTV, 2023–2024; Pinoy Hits, 2024–present; GTV's Balitanghali)
- Review Philippines (2005–2007; GMA Pinoy TV, 2007–2008; Q, GNN/One Media)
- RH Balita (2011–present; RHTV/DZRH News Television/DZRH TV)
  - RH Balita @ 2 pm (2018–present; DZRH News Television/DZRH TV)
  - RH Balita @ 3 pm (2012–2018; RHTV/DZRH News Television)
  - RH Balita @ 4 am (2018–2022; DZRH News Television/DZRH TV)
  - RH Balita @ 4 pm (2012–2017; RHTV/DZRH News Television)
  - RH Balita @ 5 am (2017–2018, 2018–2020; DZRH News Television)
  - RH Balita @ 5 pm (2015; DZRH News Television)
  - RH Balita @ 5:30 pm (2013; DZRH News Television)
  - RH Balita @ 6 pm (2011–2013; RHTV/DZRH News Television)
  - RH Balita @ 6:30 am (2017–2018; DZRH News Television)
  - RH Balita @ 7 pm (2014–2015; DZRH News Television)
  - RH Balita @ 9 pm (2011–2016; RHTV/DZRH News Television)
  - RH Balita @ 9:30 am (2014; DZRH News Television)
  - RH Balita @ 11 pm (2013; DZRH News Television)
  - RH Balita @ 11:30 am (2012; RHTV)
  - RH Balita @ 12 nn (2012–2017; RHTV/DZRH News Television)
  - RH Balita Hourly Updates (2011–present; RHTV/DZRH News Television/DZRH TV)
  - RH Balita: Saturday Edition (2018–2020, 2021–2022, 2024; DZRH News Television/DZRH TV)
  - RH Balita: Sunday Edition (2018–2019; DZRH News Television)
  - RH Balita Saturday @ 4 am (DZRH News Television/DZRH TV)
  - RH Balita Weekend @ 12 nn (2018–present; DZRH News Television/DZRH TV)
- RH Ratsada Balita (2014; DZRH News Television)
- RHTV Balita Express (2008–2012; RHTV)
- Rise and Shine Pilipinas (2020–present; PTV, 2022–2026; IBC)
- Ronda Brigada (2013–present; Brigada News TV-34/Brigada TV)
- Ronda Pasada (2025–2026; DZMM TeleRadyo)
- Ronda Pilipinas (2023–present; Radyo Pilipinas 1 Television, 2023–2026; Aliw 23, 2024–2026; DWIZ News TV)
- Ronda Trese (2000–2002; IBC)
- RJ TeleRadio (2019; RJ DigiTV)
- RPN Arangkada Xtra Balita (2000–2004; RPN)
  - RPN Arangkada Balita (2004–2006; RPN)
- RPN i-Watch News (2007–2008; RPN)
- RPN Jr. News (2004–2005; RPN)
- RPN News Update (2003–2008; RPN)
- RPN NewsWatch (1970–2012; KBS/RPN/New Vision 9)
  - RPN NewsWatch Balita Ngayon (RPN)
  - RPN NewsWatch Evening Cast (1970–1999; KBS/RPN/New Vision 9)
  - RPN NewsWatch First Edition (2008–2009; RPN)
  - NewsWatch International (1977–1990; RPN/New Vision 9)
  - NewsWatch Kids Edition (1979–1993; RPN/New Vision 9)
  - NewsWatch Morning Edition (1970–1972; KBS)
  - RPN NewsWatch Now (2001–2007; RPN)
  - NewsWatch Pilipino Edition (1981–1985; RPN)
  - NewsWatch Prime Cast (1970–2000; KBS/RPN/New Vision 9)
  - NewsWatch Primetime Edition (1999–2000; RPN)
  - NewsWatch sa Tanghali (1980s–2000; RPN)
  - NewsWatch sa Umaga (RPN)
  - RPN NewsWatch Second Edition (2008–2009; RPN)
  - RPN NewsWatch Update (2008–2011; RPN)
- RPN NewsWatch Junior Edition (2008–2009; RPN)
- RPN NewsBreak (1982–2003; RPN)
- RPN NewsCap (2009–2012; RPN)
- RPN NewsWatch Aksyon Balita (2006–2008; RPN)
- Rush Hour (2018–2019; One News)
  - Rush (2019–2022; One News)
- Sa Totoo Lang (2019–present; One PH, 2024–2026; True FM TV/True TV, 2025–present; Kapatid Channel, 2026–present; One News)
- Saksi (1999–present; GMA, 2020, 2021–2023; GMA News TV/GTV, 2023–2024; Pinoy Hits)
  - Saksi: GMA Headline Balita (1995–1999; GMA)
  - Saksi: Liga ng Katotohanan (2004–2011; GMA)
  - Saksi Breaking News (2018–2020; GMA)
- Saksi sa Dobol B (2011–2012, 2017–present; GMA News TV/GTV, 2020; GMA, 2023–2024; Pinoy Hits)
- Saturday World News (1986–1990; ABS-CBN)
- Saturday Updates (2018–2021; DZRH News Television)
- Sapul sa Singko (2010–2012; TV5, 2011–2012; AksyonTV)
  - Sapul! (2010; TV5)
- Señor Balita (2022–2023; IZTV, 2023–2026; Aliw 23, 2024–2026; DWIZ News TV, 2026–present; DWAN TV)
- Sentro (2004–2008; ABC)
- Sentro Balita (2017–present; PTV, 2020, 2022–2024; IBC, 2023–2024; Radyo Pilipinas 1 Television)
  - Sentro Balita Weekend (2024–present; PTV, 2024; IBC)
- Sikat Ka! Iloilo (2006–2018; ABS-CBN Iloilo)
  - Sikat Ka! Iloilo Sabado (ABS-CBN Iloilo)
- SMNI Morning Headlines (2016–2023; SMNI/SMNI News Channel)
- SMNI Newsbreak (2016–2023, 2023–present; SMNI/SMNI News Channel)
- SMNI Newsline (2016–2023; SMNI/SMNI News Channel)
- SMNI Newsline Philippines (2006–2016; SMNI)
- SMNI Nightline News (2021–2023, 2023–present; SMNI/SMNI News Channel)
- SNN Business Desk (SNN)
- SNN Dateline News (SNN)
- SNN International Desk (SNN)
- SNN Midday Report (SNN)
- SNN Newscenter (SNN)
- SNN Primetime News (SNN)
- SNN Weather Report (SNN)
- Solar Breaking News (2012–2014; Solar News Channel)
- Solar Network News (2012–2014; Solar News Channel)
- Solar Nightly News (2012–2014; Solar News Channel)
- SOS: Serbisyo on the Spot (2020; GMA News TV)
- Stand for Truth (2019–2020, 2020–2021; GMA News TV)
- State of the Nation (2021–present; GMA News TV/GTV)
  - State of the Nation with Jessica Soho (2011–2021; GMA News TV)
- Sunday Updates (2018–present; DZRH News Television/DZRH TV)
- Super Balita sa Umaga Nationwide (2011–2012, 2017–present; GMA News TV/GTV, 2020; GMA, 2023–2024; Pinoy Hits)
  - Super Balita sa Umaga Weekend (2017–present; GMA News TV/GTV, 2023–2024; Pinoy Hits)
  - Super Balita sa Hapon (2020; GMA News TV)
  - Super Balita sa Tanghali Nationwide (2020; GMA News TV)
- Super Radyo Nationwide (2019–2020; GMA News TV)
- Tagalog News (RBS)
- Tandem ng Bayan (2025–present; DZMM TeleRadyo/PRTV Prime Media)
- Tanghali Na Lang Ang Tapat! (2024–2025; DWAN TV)
- Ted Failon at DJ Chacha (sa Radyo5/True FM) (2020–present; One PH, 2020–2021, 2021–2024, TV5, 2024–2026; TV5/RPTV's Gud Morning Kapatid, 2026–present; TV5/RPTV's Frontline sa Umaga, 2024–present; RPTV/True FM TV/True TV, 2024; One News)
- TeleBalita (2020; TeleRadyo/Kapamilya Channel)
  - TeleBalita Weekend (2020; TeleRadyo)
- Teledyaryo (2001–2012; NBN/PTV)
  - Teledyaryo 4:30pm (2004–2006; NBN)
  - Teledyaryo 5:00pm (2006–2008; NBN)
  - Teledyaryo Ala-Una (2001–2004; NBN)
  - Teledyaryo Alas-Dose (2007–2008; NBN)
  - Teledyaryo Alas-Nuwebe (2005–2008; NBN)
  - Teledyaryo Alas-Tres (2006–2008; NBN)
  - Teledyaryo Business (2006–2008, 2010–2012; NBN/PTV)
  - Teledyaryo Final Edition (2005–2008, 2010–2012; NBN/PTV)
  - Teledyaryo Linggo (2005–2007; NBN)
  - Teledyaryo News Bulletin (2010–2012; NBN/PTV)
  - Teledyaryo ng Bayan (2005–2007; NBN)
  - Teledyaryo Panlalawigan (2005–2008; NBN)
  - Teledyaryo Primetime (2005–2008; NBN)
  - Teledyaryo Sabado (2005–2007; NBN)
  - Teledyaryo Weekend (2009–2012; NBN/PTV)
- TeleRadyo Balita (2020–2023; TeleRadyo/Kapamilya Channel)
  - TeleRadyo Balita Weekend (2020–2023; TeleRadyo)
  - TeleRadyo Breaking News (2020–2023; TeleRadyo)
  - TeleRadyo Flash Report (2020–2023; TeleRadyo)
  - TeleRadyo Live (2020–2023; TeleRadyo)
- TeleRadyo Serbisyo Balita (2023–2025; TeleRadyo Serbisyo, 2024–2025; Prime TV/PRTV Prime Media)
  - TeleRadyo Serbisyo Flash Report (2023–2024; TeleRadyo Serbisyo, 2024; Prime TV)
  - TeleRadyo Serbisyo Newsbreak (2023–2024; TeleRadyo Serbisyo, 2024; Prime TV)
- TeleRadyo Serbisyo & Radyo 630 Special Coverage (2023–2024; TeleRadyo Serbisyo, 2024; Prime TV)
- TeleRadyo Special Coverage (2020–2023; TeleRadyo)
- Teletabloid Newscast (2024–2025; Abante TeleTabloid, 2025–present; Abante TV)
- Testigo (1999–2014; GMA Davao)
- TEN: The Evening News (2008–2010; TV5)
- The 11th Hour News (MBC)
- The 11:30 Report (1982–1986; GMA)
- The Big Story (2016–present; Bloomberg TV Philippines/One News, 2019; TV5, 2024; One PH)
- The Bureau (2012–2019; ANC)
  - The Bureau @ 4 pm (2012–2019; ANC)
  - The Bureau @ 7 pm (2017–2019; ANC)
- The DPI Mid-Day Report (1978; GTV)
- The Exchange with Rico Hizon (2020–2024; CNN Philippines)
- The Final Report (1997–1998; PTV)
- The Final Word with Rico Hizon (2020–2024; CNN Philippines)
- The Headlines (2013–2015; Solar News Channel/9TV, 2020–2024; CNN Philippines)
- The Hour Updates (1989–1994; New Vision 9)
- The Morning Show (1974–1978; GTV, 1995–2020; ABS-CBN Bacolod, 2005–2007, 2010–2012; NBN/PTV)
- The News with Uncle Bob (1961–1972; RBS)
- The Nine O'Clock Report (1971–1972; IBC)
- The PH Insider (2025–present; D8TV)
- The Saturday Report (RPN)
- The Situation Report (2025; DZRH TV)
- The Sunday Report (RPN)
- The Weekend News (1996–2001; ABS-CBN/SNC/ANC, 2012–2016; PTV)
- The Weekender World (2006–2009; SMNI)
- The World Today (1972–1974; RBS)
- The World Tonight (1966–1972, 1986–1999; ABS-CBN, 1996–present; SNN/ANC, 2020; DZMM TeleRadyo, 2020–present; Kapamilya Channel, 2026–present; All TV)
  - The World Tonight Weekend (1987–1996; ABS-CBN, 1999–2020, 2020–2024; ANC)
- This Week Tonight (1977–1989; RPN)
- TNT: Tomorrow's News Tonight (2017–present; DZRH News Television/DZRH TV)
- Todo Arangkada Balita (2016–2017; 8TriTV)
- Todo Balita (2007–2010; DZMM TeleRadyo, 2010; ABS-CBN)
- Top Story (2002–present; ANC, 2020; DZMM TeleRadyo)
  - Top Story Weekend (2002–2020, 2020–2024; ANC)
- Top Senate Stories (2024–2025; DWAN TV)
- Traffic Center (2015–2024; CNN Philippines)
- Treze Express (2026–present; IBC)
- Treze Mornings (2026–present; IBC/DWAN TV)
- Treze sa Tanghali (2026–present; IBC/Congress TV/DWAN TV)
- True FM Balita Pilipinas (2024–2026; True TV)
  - True FM News Update (2024–present; True TV)
- Tutok 13 (2019–2026; IBC, 2024–2026; DWAN TV)
- Tutok Treze (2026–present; IBC/DWAN TV)
- TV 13 News (1967–1969; IBC)
- TV 13 Newstime (1969–1970; IBC)
- TV Newscoop (RBS)
- TV Patrol (1987–2020; ABS-CBN, 2007–2020, 2025–present; DZMM TeleRadyo, 2020–present; ANC/Kapamilya Channel, 2020–2023; TeleRadyo, 2022–present; A2Z, 2023–2025; TeleRadyo Serbisyo, 2024–present; All TV/Prime TV/PRTV Prime Media)
  - TV Patrol 4 (1988–1995; ABS-CBN Bacolod)
  - TV Patrol Bacolod (2001–2007; ABS-CBN Bacolod)
  - TV Patrol Baguio (1995–2000; ABS-CBN Baguio)
  - TV Patrol Bicol (2005–2020; ABS-CBN Naga)
  - TV Patrol Butuan (1999–2011; ABS-CBN Butuan)
  - TV Patrol Cagayan de Oro (1995–2001; ABS-CBN Cagayan de Oro)
  - TV Patrol Cagayan Valley (2005–2018; ABS-CBN Isabela)
  - TV Patrol Caraga (2011–2018; ABS-CBN Butuan)
  - TV Patrol Cebu (1988–2000; ABS-CBN Cebu)
  - TV Patrol Central Mindanao (2005–2018; ABS-CBN Cotabato)
  - TV Patrol Central Visayas (2000–2020; ABS-CBN Cebu)
  - TV Patrol Chavacano (2000–2020; ABS-CBN Zamboanga)
  - TV Patrol Cotabato (1999–2005; ABS-CBN Cotabato)
  - TV Patrol Dagupan (1999–2006; ABS-CBN Dagupan)
  - TV Patrol Davao (1997–2001; ABS-CBN Davao)
  - TV Patrol Dumaguete (1995–2005; ABS-CBN Dumaguete)
  - TV Patrol Eastern Visayas (2018–2020; ABS-CBN Tacloban)
  - TV Patrol Express (2024–present; ABS-CBN News/Kapamilya Channel/A2Z/All TV/ANC, 2024–2026; Jeepney TV)
  - TV Patrol General Santos (1996–2000; ABS-CBN General Santos)
  - TV Patrol Iligan (1999–2006; ABS-CBN Iligan)
  - TV Patrol Ilocos (2008–2018; ABS-CBN Laoag)
  - TV Patrol Iloilo (2001–2011; ABS-CBN Iloilo)
  - TV Patrol Isabela (1998–2004; ABS-CBN Isabela)
  - TV Patrol Laoag (1997–2008; ABS-CBN Laoag)
  - TV Patrol Legazpi (1997–2005; ABS-CBN Legazpi)
  - TV Patrol Linggo (2004–2010; ABS-CBN, 2007–2010; DZMM TeleRadyo)
  - TV Patrol Mindanao (1989–1997, 2001–2005; ABS-CBN Davao)
  - TV Patrol Morning Edition (1995–1998; ABS-CBN Bacolod)
  - TV Patrol Naga (1996–2005; ABS-CBN Naga)
  - TV Patrol Negros (1995–2001, 2007–2020; ABS-CBN Bacolod)
  - TV Patrol North Central Luzon (2006–2018; ABS-CBN Dagupan)
  - TV Patrol North Luzon (2018–2020; ABS-CBN Baguio)
  - TV Patrol North Mindanao (2018–2020; ABS-CBN Cagayan de Oro)
  - TV Patrol Northern Luzon (2000–2018; ABS-CBN Baguio)
  - TV Patrol Northern Mindanao (2001–2018; ABS-CBN Cagayan de Oro)
  - TV Patrol Northwestern Mindanao (2008–2009; ABS-CBN Pagadian)
  - TV Patrol Pagadian (1995–2008; ABS-CBN Pagadian)
  - TV Patrol Palawan (2011–2020; ABS-CBN Palawan)
  - TV Patrol Pampanga (2006–2018; ABS-CBN Pampanga)
  - TV Patrol Panay (2011–2020; ABS-CBN Iloilo)
  - TV Patrol Regional (2025–2026; ABS-CBN News/Kapamilya Channel/A2Z/All TV)
  - TV Patrol Sabado (2004–2010; ABS-CBN, 2007–2010; DZMM TeleRadyo)
  - TV Patrol Socsksargen (2000–2018; ABS-CBN General Santos)
  - TV Patrol South Central Mindanao (2018–2020; ABS-CBN General Santos)
  - TV Patrol Southern Mindanao (2005–2020; ABS-CBN Davao)
  - TV Patrol Southern Tagalog (2009–2020; ABS-CBN Batangas)
  - TV Patrol Tacloban (1997–2018; ABS-CBN Tacloban)
  - TV Patrol Tuguegarao (1997–2004; ABS-CBN Tuguegarao)
  - TV Patrol Weekend (2010–2020; ABS-CBN, 2020, 2025–present; DZMM TeleRadyo, 2020–present; ANC/Kapamilya Channel, 2020–2023; TeleRadyo, 2022–present; A2Z, 2023–2025; TeleRadyo Serbisyo, 2024–present; All TV/Prime TV/PRTV Prime Media)
  - TV Patrol Western Visayas (1994–2001; ABS-CBN Bacolod, 1998–2001; ABS-CBN Iloilo)
  - TV Patrol World (2004–2010; ABS-CBN, 2007–2010; DZMM TeleRadyo)
  - TV Patrol Zamboanga (1995–2000; ABS-CBN Zamboanga)
- Una sa Lahat (2025–present; TV5/RPTV/One PH, 2025; True TV, 2025–2026; Kapatid Channel)
- UNTV News (2012–2016; UNTV)
  - UNTV C-News (2016–present; UNTV)
  - UNTV Hataw Balita (2005–2017; UNTV)
  - UNTV News Worldwide (2020–2024; UNTV)
  - UNTV Newsbreak (2016–present; UNTV)
- Ulat A2Z (2021–present; A2Z)
- Ulat Bayan (2017–present; PTV, 2024; DWAN TV, 2026–present; Radyo Pilipinas 1 Television)
  - Ulat Bayan Weekend (2017–present; PTV, 2022–2024; IBC, 2023–present; Radyo Pilipinas 1 Television)
- Umagang Kay Ganda (2007–2020; ABS-CBN, 2007–2015; ANC)
- Una Ka Bai: Balita at Iba pa (2007–2015; GMA Davao)
- Unang Hirit (1999–present; GMA)
- Veritas Balita (2007–present; TV Maria, 2021–present; Veritas TV)
- Wake Up Call (1994–1998; RPN)
- Walang Bola, Puro Tama (2026–present; D8TV)
- Weather HQ (2024−2025; Bilyonaryo News Channel)
- Weekender World (SMNI/SMNI News Channel)
- Why News (2015–2024; UNTV)
- Windows with Johnny Revilla (1988–1995; PTV)
- World Report (2001–2008; Net 25)
  - World Report Early Edition (2001–2003; Net 25)
  - World Report Filipino Edition (2001–2004; Net 25)
- Yan Tayo (2024–2025; TeleRadyo Serbisyo, 2025–present; DZMM TeleRadyo)
- ZOE Balita Ngayon (1998–2005; ZOE TV)
  - ZOE News Round-up (1998–2005; ZOE TV)
  - ZTV Newsbreak (2008–2011; ZOE TV)

== Reality and talent search ==
- 30 Days (2004; GMA)
- Ang Bagong Kampeon (1985–1988, RPN)
- Ang Yaman ni Lola (2010–2011; GMA)
- Ano Bang Trip Mo? (2007–2008; Studio 23)
- Artista Academy (2012; TV5)
- Batang Vidaylin (2000–2001; ABC)
- Be the Next: 9 Dreamers (2025; TV5)
- Bet ng Bayan (2014; GMA)
- Birit Bulilit (1995–1996; IBC)
- Bitoy's Showwwtime (2009–2010; GMA)
- Boracay Bodies (2013; TV5)
- Born Diva (2004; ABS-CBN)
- Born to Be a Star (2016–2021; TV5)
- Buhay Beauty Queen (2004; ABC)
- Catch Me Out Philippines (2021; GMA)
- Celebrity Dance Battle (2014; TV5)
- Celebrity Duets: Philippine Edition (2007–2009; GMA)
- Centerstage (2020–2021; GMA)
- Coca-Cola's Ride to Fame: Yes to Your Dreams! (2007; GMA)
- Day Off (2005–2019; QTV/Q/GMA News TV)
- Dobol Inkredibol (1998–1999; ABC)
- Dream Maker: Search for the Next Global Pop Group (2022–2023; Kapamilya Channel/A2Z, 2023; TV5/PIE Channel)
- Driven to Extremes (2014; S+A)
- Extra Challenge (1999–2006, 2012–2013; GMA)
- Extreme Makeover: Home Edition Philippines (2006; QTV, 2012; TV5)
- Extreme Series: Kaya Mo Ba 'To? (2015; TV5)
- Fam Jam (2005–2006; QTV)
- Follow the Star (2011–2014; GMA News TV)
- Freedom Riders Asia (2014; S+A)
- GEN M Generation Mega (ETC)
- Global Shockers (2006–2007; ABC)
- GT Academy (2014; S+A)
- Hashtag Like (2016–2017; GMA)
- Hayop na Hayop (2006–2007; ABC)
- Heart World (2024–present; GMA)
- Here Comes the Bride (2007: Q)
- Hollywood Boot Camp (2007; Q)
- Hollywood Dream (2005; ABC)
- I Am Meg (2012–2014; ETC)
- Idol Philippines (2019; ABS-CBN, 2022; Kapamilya Channel/A2Z/TV5)
  - Idol Kids Philippines (2025; Kapamilya Channel/A2Z/TV5)
- In the Loop (2012; ABS-CBN/CgeTV)
- i-Shine Talent Camp (2011–2012; GMA, 2012–2014; ABS-CBN)
- It Takes Gutz to Be A Gutierrez (2014; TV5)
- It's A Guy Thing (Studio 23)
- Juan Direction (2013–2014; TV5, 2014; AksyonTV)
- Kamao: Matira ang Matibay (2005)
- Kanta Pilipinas (2013; TV5)
- Karinderya Wars (2013; TV5)
- KISPinoy: The K-Pop Philippination (2015; TV5)
- Kitchen Superstar (2011; GMA)
- Kumusta (2026; TV5/Viu)
- Kung Ako Ikaw (2007–2008; GMA)
- Kung May Hirap, May Ginhawa (2012–2013; TV5)
- Lip Sync Battle Philippines (2016–2018; GMA)
- Little Big Shots (2017; ABS-CBN)
- Little Big Star (2005–2007; ABS-CBN)
  - Little Big Superstar (2007; ABS-CBN)
- Masked Singer Pilipinas (2020–2022, 2025; TV5, 2025; Sari-Sari Channel)
- MEGA Fashion Crew (2011–2014; ETC)
- Mga Kwento ni Marc Logan (2014–2017; ABS-CBN)
- Mind Master (2011; GMA)
- Move: The Search for Billy Crawford's Pinoy Dancers (2007; GMA)
- Move It: Clash of the Streetdancers (2015; TV5)
- MTV Superstah (2004; MTV Philippines)
- Na-Scam Ka Na Ba? (2006; QTV)
- OMG (2008–2009; TV5)
- On-Air (2001–2004; ABC, 2005; IBC)
- Paligsahan sa Awit (1977–1980; IBC)
- Pasikatan sa 13 (1992–1994; IBC)
- Pasikatan sa 9 (1993–1995; New Vision 9/RPN)
- Pasikatan: CLTV 36 Talent Search (2015; CLTV)
- Perfect Moments (2005; ABS-CBN)
- Philippine Idol (2006; ABC)
- Philippines' Next Top Model (2007; RPN, 2017; TV5)
- Philippines Scariest Challenge (2008–2009; TV5)
- Pilipinas Got Talent (2010–2018; ABS-CBN, 2025; Kapamilya Channel/A2Z/TV5)
- Pinoy Big Brother (2005–2019; ABS-CBN, 2020–2024; Kapamilya Channel/A2Z, 2021, 2024; TV5, 2025–present; GMA)
- Pinoy Dream Academy (2006–2008; ABS-CBN)
- Pinoy Fear Factor (2008–2009; ABS-CBN)
- Pinoy Idol (2008; GMA)
- Pinoy Pop Superstar (2004–2007; GMA)
- Planet X (2001–2003; ABC)
- POPinoy (2021; TV5/Colours)
  - POPinoy Access (2021; Colours)
  - POPinoy PopDates (2021; TV5/Colours)
- Popstar Kids (2005–2007; QTV/Q)
- Project Runway Philippines (2008; ETC)
- Qpids (2005; ABS-CBN)
- Ripley's Believe It or Not! (2006–2007; ABC, 2008–2010; GMA)
- Rising Stars Philippines (2015; TV5)
- Rivermaya: Bagong Liwanag (2007–2008; Studio 23)
- Running Man Philippines (2022–2024; GMA, 2024; GTV/Pinoy Hits)
- Search for a Star (2003–2004; GMA)
- Search for the Star in a Million (2005–2006; ABS-CBN)
  - Star in a Million (2003–2004; ABS-CBN)
- Shall We Dance? (2005–2010; ABC/TV5)
- Shoot That Babe (2007–2008; RPN)
- Show Ko! (2005–2006; QTV)
- Sing-ka-Galing! (2017; CLTV)
- Single (2002–2004; ABC, 2005; IBC)
- Star Circle Quest (2004–2011; ABS-CBN)
- StarDance (2005; ABS-CBN)
- Star Factor (2010; TV5)
- Star for a Night (2002–2003; IBC)
- Starkada (2023–present; Net 25)
- Star Mill (2013, 2014; CLTV)
- Stars on Ice (2007; Q)
- Stars on the Floor (2025–present; GMA)
- StarStruck (2003–2019; GMA)
  - StarStruck Kids (2004; GMA)
- Strangebrew (2001–2003; UNTV)
- Superstar Duets (2016; GMA)
- Survivor Philippines (2008–2012; GMA)
- Talentadong Pinoy (2008–2021; TV5)
  - Kwentong Talentado (2009–2010; TV5)
- Talents Academy (2023–present; IBC)
- Tanghalan ng Kampeon (1988–1993; GMA)
  - Tanghalan ng Kampeon sa TiktoClock (2024–present; GMA)
- Tawag (1973; RBS)
- Tawag ng Tanghalan (1954–1972, 1987–1989; ABS-CBN, 1974; IBC)
  - Tawag ng Tanghalan sa Showtime (2016–2020; ABS-CBN, 2018–2024; Jeepney TV, 2020–present; Kapamilya Channel/A2Z, 2022–2023; TV5, 2023–2024; GTV, 2024–present; GMA/All TV)
- The Alabang Housewives (2013; TV5)
- The Amazing Race Philippines (2012–2014; TV5)
- The Biggest Game Show in the World Asia (2012; TV5)
- The Bottomline with Boy Abunda (2009–2020; ABS-CBN/ANC)
- The Clash (2018–present; GMA)
- The Exchange (2001–2002; ABC)
- The Smiths (2011; GMA News TV)
- The Voice of the Philippines (2013–2015; ABS-CBN)
  - The Voice Generations (2023; GMA/GTV/I Heart Movies/Pinoy Hits)
  - The Voice Kids (2014–2019; ABS-CBN, 2023; Kapamilya Channel/A2Z/TV5, 2024–present; GMA/GTV, 2024; Pinoy Hits)
  - The Voice Teens (2017–2020; ABS-CBN, 2020–2024; Kapamilya Channel, 2024; A2Z/TV5)
- Three Blind Dates (2004–2005; ABC)
- Time to Dance (2025; Kapamilya Channel/Myx/A2Z)
- Todo Max (2006–2007; ABC)
- To the Top (2015; GMA)
- Trabaho Lang (2001–2003; ABC)
- U Can Dance (2006–2007; ABS-CBN)
- Ultimate Guinness World Records Pinoy Edition (2006–2007; ABC)
- Victim (2003–2004; ABS-CBN)
  - Victim Undercover (2004; ABS-CBN)
  - Victim Extreme (2004–2005; ABS-CBN)
- Video Incredible (2012; TV5)
- World of Dance Philippines (2019; ABS-CBN)
- Your Face Sounds Familiar (2015–2018; ABS-CBN, 2021–present; Kapamilya Channel/A2Z, 2025–2026; TV5, 2026; All TV)
  - Your Face Sounds Familiar Kids (2017–2018; ABS-CBN/Yey!)

== Religious ==
- 1 O Clock W.I.S.H Prayer (produced by Mama Mary's Movement Foundation) (1992–2008; ABC)
- 3 O Clock Divine Mercy Prayer (produced by Archdiocesan Shrine of Divine Mercy Maysilo Circle, Boni Avenue, Mandaluyong City) (2001–2008; ABC)
- ACS Sunday Mass (2020–present; DZRH News Television/DZRH TV)
- Alay Kay Inang Maria (2021–present; Veritas TV)
- All for Jesus Happenings (1979–1995; IBC/Islands TV 13)
- Ang Banal na Orasyon (2018–present; DZRH News Television/DZRH TV)
- Ang Biblia Ngayon (2021–present; Veritas TV)
- Ang Dating Daan (1983–1997; IBC/Islands TV 13, 1992–1998; New Vision 9/RPN, 1997–1999; RJTV, 1999–2000, 2013; PTV, 2000–2004; SBN, 2004–present; UNTV)
  - Ang Dating Daan: Mandarin Edition (2008–present; UNTV)
  - Ang Dating Daan: Worldwide Bible Study (2021–present; UNTV)
- Ang Iglesia ni Cristo (1983–1990; MBS/PTV/RPN/New Vision 9, 1983–1986; City2/BBC, 1990–2003; ABS-CBN, 2000–present; Net 25, 2002; IBC, 2005–present; GEM TV/INC TV)
- Ang Mga Nagsialis sa Samahang Ang Dating Daan (2006–2007; Net 25)
- Ang Pagbubunyag (2012–present; INC TV/Net 25)
- Ang Pitong Huling Salita (2020; ABS-CBN/S+A/DZMM TeleRadyo)
- Ang Salita ng Diyos (2021–present; Veritas TV)
- Ang Tamang Daan (2001–2003; SBN, 2001–present; Net 25, 2012–2019; INC TV)
- Ano’ng Say ni Father, Ano’ng Say ni Brother? (2022–2023; IZTV, 2023–2026; Aliw 23, 2024–2026; DWIZ News TV)
- Answers with Bayless Conley (1999–2002; IBC)
- Apolohetika (2021–present; Veritas TV)
- Armor of God (2010–2012; Q/GMA News TV)
- Asin at Ilaw (2000–2007; RPN, 2008–2011; IBC)
- Atmosphere of Miracles (2023; PTV)
- Believers Voice of Victory (2006–2010; IBC)
- Beyond Today (2016–2018; GMA News TV, 2022–2023; GMA)
- Bisperas sa Veritas (2021–present; Veritas TV)
- Biyaya ng Panginoon (2008–2011; IBC)
- Bro. Eddie Villanueva Classics (2020–present; A2Z/Light TV)
- Bukang Liwayway (1986–1994; ABS-CBN)
- Cathedral of Praise with David Sumrall (1986–1992; ABS-CBN, 1995–2002; GMA, 2003–2005; RPN)
- CCF Worship Service (2020–2026; TV5, 2020–2022; One PH)
- Celebrating Life (2023–present; Radyo Pilipinas 1 Television)
- Celebration of the Lord's Supper (2007–2008; ABC, 2011–2020; ABS-CBN, 2021–present; Kapamilya Channel/A2Z)
- Cenacle sa Veritas (2021–present; Veritas TV)
- Christ is the Answer (1983–1987; GMA)
- City Sanctuary Worship Celebration (2020–2026; Light TV)
- Community Mass on ABC (2004–2008; ABC)
- Count Your Blessings (2020–present; Light TV)
- Daily Mass at the Manila Cathedral (2020; TV5)
- Dati'y Nasa Sumpa, Ngayon'y Nasa Tama (2004–2006; Net 25)
- Daylight Devotion (2019–present; Light TV)
- Divine Mercy Hour (2021–present; Veritas TV)
- Divine Mercy Live TV Mass (2003–2007; NBN)
- Divine Word Missionary TV Mass (in cooperation with Divine Word Missionary) (2020–present; One PH)
- Doulos Cell Celebration (2021–present; Light TV)
- Dr. Love Radio Show (2007–2022; DZMM TeleRadyo/TeleRadyo, 2024–2026; True FM TV/True TV)
- D'X-Man (2004–2017, 2017–2023; UNTV)
- Easter Vigil TV Mass (2007–2008; ABC)
- Ecclesia in Asia: Ang Misa (2000–2010; GMA)
- El Shaddai (1992–2020; Islands TV 13/IBC)
- Emmanuel TV (2007; RPN)
- Equip (2021–present; Light TV)
- Eucharistia: Pananalangin at Pag-aaral (2019–2020; GMA News TV)
- Family Land's Children Show (2006–2008; ABC)
- Family Matters (produced by Family Rosary Crusade) (2010–2014; NBN/PTV, 2010–2016; TV5)
- Family Rosary Crusade (1987–2003; ABS-CBN, 1987–2014; PTV/NBN, 1987–2007; RPN/New Vision 9, 1992–2008; ABC, 2003–2018; Studio 23/S+A)
- Family TV Mass (2002–2014, 2015–2019; IBC, 2014; GMA, 2019–2024; 5 Plus/One Sports)
- Feast TV (2019–2024; IBC, 2020–2022; One PH)
- Friends Again (1999–2007; IBC, 2003–2007; RPN/SBN, 2007–2008; NBN, 2008–2014; Studio 23, 2014–2020; S+A)
- Gabay sa Bibliya sa Radyo (2021–present; Veritas TV)
- Gabay sa Mabuting Asal (1999–2002; GMA, 2001–2005, 2012–present; Net 25, 2012–present; INC TV)
- GBU: God Bless U (2023–2025; TeleRadyo Serbisyo, 2024–2026; Prime TV/PRTV Prime Media, 2025–2026; DZMM TeleRadyo)
- God Will Make a Way (2021–present; Veritas TV)
- Great Day to Live with Greg Durante (2011–2012; IBC)
- GNPI Series (2023–present; Light TV)
- Good News (2021–present; Light TV)
- Greg Durante Ministries (2009–2011; IBC)
- Guidelines with Dr. Harold J. Sala (1980–2002; GMA, 2002–2005; ABC)
- Healing Mass for the Homebound with Fr. Mario Sobrejuanite (produced by Rivers of Living Water now ACTS Catholic Community) (2006–2014; Studio 23, 2014–2020; Solar News Channel/9TV/CNN Philippines)
- Healing Mass sa Veritas (in cooperation with Veritas 846) (2020–present; TV5/One PH, 2021–present; Veritas TV, 2024–present; True FM TV/True TV, 2026–present; Kapatid Channel)
- Healing Touch sa Veritas (2021–present; Veritas TV)
- Heartbeat (1989–1997; GMA)
- Heart of Wisdom (2021–2025; Light TV)
- Heart to Heart Talk (1992–2007; RPN/New Vision 9, 2008–2011; NBN)
- Hello Father 911 (2021–present; Veritas TV)
- Holy Mass (2026–present; AllRadio TV)
- Holy Rosary (2021–present; Veritas TV)
- How Authentic the Bible Is (2004–present; UNTV)
- Iglesia ni Cristo and the Bible (2000–2001; IBC)
- Iglesia ni Cristo Chronicles (2004–2009; Net 25)
- Iglesia ni Cristo International Edition (2012–present; INC TV)
- I Love Jesus Street Mission (2024–2025; Light TV)
- Ilaw ng Kaligtasan (2004–2007; Net 25)
- In Touch with Dr. Charles Stanley (1992–2004, 2008–2021; GMA, 2013–2017, 2017–present; GMA News TV/GTV, 1998–2005; ZOE TV, 2018–2019; Light TV, 2018–2019; CNN Philippines, 2019–present; TV5)
- Inside the Fishbowl (produced by Shepherd's Voice Publications Inc.) (2008–2010; TV5)
- Island Life (1983–1993; RPN/New Vision 9)
- Itanong mo kay Soriano (2004–present; UNTV)
- Ito ang Payo (2003–2006; Net 25)
- Jesus I Trust in You!: The 3:00 pm Prayer Habit (1985–2007; RPN/New Vision 9, 1986–2002; ABS-CBN)
- Jesus: Lord of the Nations (2004–2007; SBN)
- Jesus Miracle Crusade International Ministry (1975–1993; IBC/Islands TV 13, 1988–2002; GMA, 1986–1995, 2007–present; NBN/PTV)
- Jesus the Healer (1989–1999, 2006–2019; GMA, 1998–2005, 2008–2011; ZOE TV, 2005–2011; QTV/Q, 2011–2019; GMA News TV, 2011–2014, 2018–present; Light TV, 2014; PTV, 2014–2018; Light Network, 2020–present; A2Z)
- JIL Faith/Prayer Revival Meeting (2025–present; Light TV)
- JIL Live Worship and Healing Service (2018–present; Light TV, 2020–present; A2Z)
- JMM Covers (2014–2015; PTV)
- John Osteen (1975–1990; GMA)
- Kamay ni Hesus Healing Mass (in cooperation with Kamay ni Hesus Healing Church) (2020–present; One PH)
- Kapamilya Daily Mass (2020; ABS-CBN/S+A/DZMM TeleRadyo, 2020–2023; TeleRadyo, 2020–present; Kapamilya Channel, 2021–present; Jeepney TV, 2026–present; All TV)
- Kapamilya Journey's of Hope (2020–2024; Jeepney TV, 2021–2023; TeleRadyo, 2023; Kapamilya Channel)
- Kapamilya Sunday Mass (2021–present; Jeepney TV)
- Kapanalig Hour (2021–present; Veritas TV)
- Kapanalig sa DZRH (2013–present; DZRH News Television/DZRH TV)
- Kape at Salita (2018–2020; DZMM TeleRadyo/ABS-CBN, 2020–2021; TeleRadyo)
- Kape't Pandasal (2004–2020; ABS-CBN, 2020–present; TV Maria, 2024–present; Bilyonaryo News Channel)
- Kasama Natin ang Diyos (2013–2014; PTV)
- Keep the Faith: Daily Mass with the Jesuits (2024–present; Bilyonaryo News Channel, 2024–2025; Abante TeleTabloid/Abante TV)
- Kerygma TV (2003–2007; RPN/SBN, 2007–2010; ABC/TV5, 2011–2019; IBC, 2010–2020; ANC)
- Lakbay Simbahan (2013; PTV)
- Lakbites (2024–present; Aliw 23)
- Life Giver (2012–2024; Light TV, 2012–2019; GMA News TV)
- Life in the Word (1996–2005; RPN)
- Light of Salvation (2008–2012; Net 25)
- Light Moments (2008–2020; DZMM TeleRadyo/TeleRadyo)
- Light Talk (2006–2008; ABC)
- Light Up (2011–2022; Light TV, 2011–2019; GMA News TV, 2017–2019; GMA)
- Living the Blessing (2023–present; Light TV)
- Living Word (2023–present; Light TV)
- Mama Mary Holy Mass (2008–2010; NBN)
- Manila Cathedral Sunday Mass (2020; TV5, 2020–2025; One PH, 2022–2023; IZTV, 2023–2024; Aliw 23)
- Mapalad ang Bumabasa (2005–2016; UNTV)
- Mag Smile Club Na! (1996–1999; IBC)
- Mass at the Gesu (2007–2008; ABC)
- May Liwanag (2006–2007; RPN)
- MCGI Global Prayer for Humanity (2020–present; UNTV)
- Men of Light (2007–present; TV Maria)
- Midnight Prayer Helps (2005–2011; QTV/Q, 2008–2011; ZOE TV, 2011–2019; GMA News TV, 2011–2020; Light TV/Light Network)
- Misa Nazareno (2007–present; TV Maria, 2010–2020; TV5, 2024–present; Aliw 23)
- Misa Tradionalis Latin Mass and Catechism (2020; IBC)
- Mustard TV (produced by Shepherd's Voice Publications Inc.) (2008–2010; TV5)
- Once Upon a Saint (produced by Family Rosary Crusade) (2007–2021; TV Maria)
- Oras ng Himala (1996–2001; IBC, 2001–2007; SBN, 2003–2004; UNTV, 2006–2007; RPN, 2007–2021, 2023–2026; NBN/PTV, 2020–2023; RJ DigiTV, 2022–present; TV5, 2023–present; Solar Sports/SolarFlix, 2023–2024; One PH)
- Oras ng Katotohanan (1991–1995, 2001–2018; IBC, 2001–2007; RJTV, 2004–2007; SBN, 2013–2018; PTV, 2016–2025; Life TV, 2025–present; TV5)
- Our Father in Heaven (2021–present; Veritas TV)
- Panalangin (2014–2017; PTV)
- Panalangin ng Bayan (2017–present; PTV)
- Panalangin Para sa Dakilang Awa (2018–present; DZRH News Television/DZRH TV)
- Panalangin sa Alas Tres ng Hapon (2007–2020, 2025–present; DZMM TeleRadyo, 2020; TeleRadyo, 2024–2025; TeleRadyo Serbisyo, 2024–present; Prime TV/PRTV Prime Media)
- Panalangin sa Ikatlo ng Hapon (2002–2020; ABS-CBN, 2020–present; Kapamilya Channel, 2026–present; All TV)
- Pasugo: Ang Tinig ng Iglesia ni Cristo (1999–2002; PTV/NBN, 2001–2005, 2010–present; Net 25, 2002–2005; GMA, 2005–present; GEM TV/INC TV)
- Philippines for Jesus Presents (1983–1998; GMA)
- PJM Forum (1998–2005, 2008–2011; ZOE TV, 2005–2011; QTV/Q, 2011–2019; GMA News TV. 2011–2014, 2018–2020; Light TV, 2014–2018; Light Network)
- Powerline (1995–2007; SMNI)
- Power to Unite with Elvira (2007–present; TV Maria, 2013–2019; RHTV/DZRH News Television, 2018–2023; RJ DigiTV, 2019–2020; IBC)
- Prayer Line (2018–present; Light TV, 2022; A2Z)
- Prayer for the Holy Souls in Purgatory (2002–2014; NBN/PTV)
- P.Y (Praise Youth) (1992–1996; Islands TV 13/IBC)
- River of Worship (2015–2019; GMA News TV, 2015–2026; Light TV)
- Rosary Hour (2023–2025; TeleRadyo Serbisyo, 2024–present; Prime TV/PRTV Prime Media, 2025–present; DZMM TeleRadyo)
- Rosaryo ng Bayan: Holy Rosary on the Air (2017–2020; DZMM TeleRadyo, 2020–2022; TeleRadyo)
- Sa Inyong Mga Kamay (2013; PTV)
- Sacred Space on Air (2021–present; Veritas TV)
- Saint Peregrine Sunday TV Mass (1989–2008; IBC/Islands TV 13)
- Salita ng Diyos, Salita ng Buhay (TV Maria)
- Salitang Buhay (2007–2020; DZMM TeleRadyo)
- Sambuhay TV Mass (2011; NBN, 2011–present; TV Maria, 2020; GMA)
- Santuario de San Antonio Anticipated Sunday Mass (in cooperation with Santuario de San Antonio Parish) (2020–2024; One PH)
- Saturday Psalms and Sounds (2021–present; Veritas TV)
- Seven Last Words (2006–2019; ABS-CBN/DZMM TeleRadyo, 2021–present; Kapamilya Channel/A2Z, 2023–present; Jeepney TV)
- Shalom (1979–2007; RPN/New Vision 9, 2014, 2017–2018; IBC)
- Sharing in the City (1979–2007; RPN/New Vision 9)
- Signs and Wonders (produced by The Lord's Flock Catholic Charismatic Community) (1998–2002; GMA, 2002–2007; RPN, 2007–2008; ABC, 2008–2009, 2011–2016; NBN/PTV, 2009–2011; IBC)
- Siete Palabras (produced by Dominican Province of the Philippines) (1987–2007; RPN/New Vision 9, 2008; ABC, 2009–present; GMA)
- Solemn Sessions (2012–2018; Light TV)
- Spiritual Vignettes (1978–1998; RPN/New Vision 9)
- Start Your Day the Christian Way (2005–2011; UNTV)
- Stations of the Cross (2007–2008; ABC)
- Straight from the Word (2019–present; Light TV)
- Study in the Word (1982–1985; IBC)
- Sugo (produced by Family Rosary Crusade) (2014; TV5)
- Sunday Gospel Reflections (produced by Family Rosary Crusade) (2007–present; TV Maria)
- Sunday Mass on ABC (1992–2004; ABC)
- Sunday Psalms and Sounds (2021–present; Veritas TV)
- Sunday TV Mass (1985–2007; RPN/New Vision 9, 1990–2006; ABS-CBN, 2024–present; One Sports)
- Sunny Side Up (2024–2025; TeleRadyo Serbisyo, 2025–present; DZMM TeleRadyo)
- T.A.H.O (Tawanan at Awitan kay Hesus Oras-oras) (1996–1998; IBC)
- Talitha Kum Healing Mass on TV (2002–2019; NBN/PTV)
- Tastetimony (2024–present; Aliw 23)
- Teaching the Bible (2023–2026; Light TV)
- The 700 Club Asia (1994–2002, 2015–present; GMA, 2002–2003; ABC, 2002–2006; ABS-CBN, 2003–2006; Studio 23, 2006–2015; QTV/Q/GMA News TV, 2011–2014, 2018–2019; Light TV, 2014–2018; Light Network)
- The Chaplet of the Divine Mercy (1985–2007; RPN/New Vision 9, 1992–2008; ABC, 2007–present; TV Maria)
- The Ensign (produced by the Church of Jesus Christ of Latter-day Saints) (1986–1997; PTV)
- The Healing Eucharist (2006–2020; ABS-CBN, 2012–present; Jeepney TV, 2014; S+A, 2020–present; Kapamilya Channel, 2021–2023; TeleRadyo, 2026–present; All TV)
- The Hour of Great Mercy (1987–2014; PTV/NBN)
- The Key of David (2012–2019; PTV, 2019–2020; CNN Philippines, 2020–2023; TV5, 2022–2023; GTV, 2023–present; GMA, 2023–2024; Pinoy Hits)
- The Message (1987–2003; ABS-CBN, 1992–1998; IBC, 2012–present; INC TV)
- The Pulpit of Christ (1986–2001; GMA)
- The Rev. Ernest Angley Hour (1983–1995; GMA)
- The Rock of My Salvation (2005–2007; IBC)
- The Word Exposed with Luis Antonio Cardinal Tagle (produced by Jesuit Communications Foundation) (2008–2010; TV5, 2008–present; TV Maria, 2010–present; ANC, 2010–2014; Studio 23, 2011–2015; NBN/PTV, 2014–2020; S+A, 2022–present; SolarFlix, 2022–2025; DepEd ALS, 2024–present; Bilyonaryo News Channel)
- The World Tomorrow (1974–1994; GMA, 1989–1999; RPN/New Vision 9)
- This Is My Story, This Is My Song (2012–2018; Light TV/GMA News TV)
- This New Life (In cooperation with Alabang New Life Christian Center) (2006–2011; IBC, 2009–2010; TV5, 2012–2019; RHTV/DZRH News Television)
- This is Your Day (2001–2011; IBC, 2003–2007; RPN)
- Three Minutes a Day with Fr. James Reuter SJ (produced by Family Rosary Crusade) (1998–2008; ABC)
- Tinig ng Kanyang Pagbabalik (2004–2007; SBN, 2005–2010; IBC)
- Tinig sa Itaas (1988–1998; GMA)
- Tomorrow's World (2018–2019; PTV, 2019–2020; CNN Philippines, 2020–2023, 2024; TV5, 2023–2024; A2Z)
- Trip ni Dre (2024–present; Aliw 23)
- Truth in Focus (2004–present; UNTV)
- Try God (1981–1991; IBC/Islands TV 13)
- Tubig ng Buhay (2008; ABC)
- Unos (produced by Family Rosary Crusade) (2014; TV5)
- UNTV Community Prayer (2013–present; UNTV)
- Usapang Kapatid (2007–2020; DZMM TeleRadyo)
- Vaticano (2007–present; TV Maria)
- Veneration of the Cross (2007–2008; ABC)
- Visita Iglesia (2013–present; GMA Regional TV)
- What Would Jesus Do? (2001–2006; RPN)
- Who's Calling (2015–2017; PTV)
- Word for the Season (2020–present; Light TV, 2022; A2Z)
- Word Made Flesh (2004–2008; ABC)
- Word of God Network (2015–2025; TV5, 2018–2019; AksyonTV, 2019–2020; One PH, 2020–2024; PTV, 2024–2025; True FM TV/True TV, 2025–present; GTV)
- Word of Hope (1989–2002; GMA)
- Worship, Word & Wonders (2018–present; Light TV, 2018–2019; GMA News TV, 2022; A2Z)

== Soap operas ==
- 100 Days to Heaven (2011; ABS-CBN)
- 2 Good 2 Be True (2022; Kapamilya Channel/A2Z/TV5/Jeepney TV)
- A Love to Last (2017; ABS-CBN)
- A Secret in Prague (2026; TV5/Sari-Sari Channel/One PH/All TV/A2Z/Kapamilya Channel/Netflix)
- A Soldier's Heart (2020; ABS-CBN, Kapamilya Channel)
- Abot-Kamay na Pangarap (2022–2024; GMA, 2023–2024; Pinoy Hits, 2024; GTV)
- Agawin Mo Man Ang Lahat (2006; GMA)
- Alyas Robin Hood (2016–2017; GMA)
- Amaya (2011–2012; GMA)
- Ang Iibigin ay Ikaw (2002–2003; GMA)
  - Ang Iibigin ay Ikaw Pa Rin (2003; GMA)
- Ang Makulay na Daigdig ni Nora (1974–1979; KBS/RPN)
- Ang sa Iyo Ay Akin (2020–2021; Kapamilya Channel/A2Z/TV5/Jeepney TV)
- Angelito: Batang Ama (2011–2012; ABS-CBN)
  - Angelito: Ang Bagong Yugto (2012; ABS-CBN)
- Anna Karenina (1996–2002; GMA)
  - Anna Karenina (2013; GMA)
- Anna Liza (1980–1985; GMA)
  - Annaliza (2013–2014; ABS-CBN)
- Anna Luna (1989–1994; ABS-CBN, 1994–1995; New Vision 9/RPN)
- Apoy sa Langit (2022; GMA)
- Asawa Ko, Karibal Ko (2018–2019; GMA)
- Asawa ng Asawa Ko (2024–2025; GMA/GTV, 2024; Pinoy Hits)
- Asian Treasures (2007; GMA)
- Asintado (2018; ABS-CBN)
- Babaeng Hampaslupa (2011; TV5)
- Bagong Umaga (2020–2021; Kapamilya Channel/A2Z)
- Bakekang (2006–2007; GMA)
- Basta't Kasama Kita (2003–2004; ABS-CBN)
- Be Careful with My Heart (2012–2014; ABS-CBN)
- Be My Lady (2016; ABS-CBN)
- Beautiful Justice (2019–2020; GMA)
- Because of You (2015–2016; GMA)
- Binibining Marikit (2025; GMA)
- Bituin (2002–2003; ABS-CBN)
- Bituing Walang Ningning (2006; ABS-CBN)
- Black Rider (2023–2024; GMA/GTV/Pinoy Hits)
- Born to Shine (2026–present; GMA)
- Bridges of Love (2015; ABS-CBN)
- Budoy (2011–2012; ABS-CBN)
- Buena Familia (2015–2016; GMA)
- Can't Buy Me Love (2023–2024; Kapamilya Channel/A2Z/TV5/Jeepney TV/Netflix/iWantTFC)
- Contessa (2018; GMA)
- Cruz vs Cruz (2025–2026; GMA)
- Dahil May Isang Ikaw (2009–2010; ABS-CBN)
- Darating ang Umaga (2003; ABS-CBN)
- Del Tierro (1997–1999; GMA)
- Doble Kara (2015–2017; ABS-CBN)
- Dolce Amore (2016; ABS-CBN)
- Dream Dad (2014–2015; ABS-CBN)
- Dugong Buhay (2013; ABS-CBN)
- Esperanza (1997–1999; ABS-CBN)
- FlordeLiza (2015; ABS-CBN)
- FPJ's Ang Probinsyano (2015–2020; ABS-CBN, 2020–2022; Kapamilya Channel/Cine Mo!/A2Z, 2021–2022; TV5)
- FPJ's Batang Quiapo (2023–2026; Kapamilya Channel/A2Z/Cine Mo!/TV5, 2023–2025; iWantTFC, 2025–2026; iWant, 2026; All TV)
- Got to Believe (2013–2014; ABS-CBN)
- Habang Kapiling Ka (2002–2003; GMA)
- Halik (2018–2019; ABS-CBN)
- Halik sa Apoy (1998–1999; GMA)
- Hanggang Kailan (2004; GMA)
- Hating Kapatid (2025–2026; GMA)
- Hindi Ko Kayang Iwan Ka (2018; GMA)
- Hiram (2004–2005; ABS-CBN)
- Honesto (2013–2014; ABS-CBN)
- Huwag Kang Mangamba (2021; Kapamilya Channel/A2Z/TV5/Jeepney TV)
- I Love Betty La Fea (2008–2009; ABS-CBN)
- Ika-5 Utos (2018–2019; GMA)
- Ika-6 na Utos (2016–2018; GMA)
- Ikaw ang Lahat sa Akin (2005; ABS-CBN)
- Ikaw Lamang (2014; ABS-CBN)
- Ikaw Lang ang Iibigin (2017–2018; ABS-CBN)
- Ikaw Lang ang Mamahalin (2001–2002; GMA)
  - Ikaw Lang ang Mamahalin (2011–2012; GMA)
- Ikaw na Sana (1997–1998; GMA)
- Ikaw sa Puso Ko (2004; GMA)
- Ikaw Sana (2009–2010; GMA)
- Ina, Kapatid, Anak (2012–2013; ABS-CBN)
- Incognito (2025; Kapamilya Channel/A2Z/TV5/Jeepney TV/Netflix/iWantTFC/iWant)
- Inday Will Always Love You (2018; GMA)
- Init sa Magdamag (2021; Kapamilya Channel/A2Z/TV5/Jeepney TV)
- It Might Be You (2003–2004; ABS-CBN)
- Kadenang Ginto (2018–2020; ABS-CBN)
- Kadenang Kristal (1995–1996; GMA)
- Kahit Puso'y Masugatan (2012–2013; ABS-CBN)
- Kamao (2026; GMA)
- Katorse (2009–2010; ABS-CBN)
- Kay Tagal Kang Hinintay (2002–2003; ABS-CBN)
- Kirara, Ano ang Kulay ng Pag-ibig? (1999–2001; GMA)
- Koreana (2010–2011; GMA)
- Kung Aagawin Mo ang Langit (2011–2012; GMA)
- Kung Ako'y Iiwan Mo (2012; ABS-CBN)
- Kung Mamahalin Mo Lang Ako (2005–2006; GMA)
- Kung Mawawala Ka (2002–2003; GMA)
- Kung Tayo'y Magkakalayo (2010; ABS-CBN)
- La Vida Lena (2020–2021; iWantTFC, 2021–2022; Kapamilya Channel/A2Z/TV5/Jeepney TV)
- Labs Ko Si Babe (1999–2000; ABS-CBN)
- Langit Lupa (2016–2017; ABS-CBN)
- Lavender Fields (2024–2025; Kapamilya Channel/A2Z/TV5/Jeepney TV/Netflix/iWantTFC)
- Ligaw na Bulaklak (2008; ABS-CBN)
- Lilet Matias: Attorney-at-Law (2024–2025; GMA, 2024; Pinoy Hits)
- Linlang (2023; Amazon Prime Video, 2024; Kapamilya Channel/A2Z/TV5/Jeepney TV)
- Love You Two (2019; GMA)
- Lumuhod Ka Sa Lupa (2024–2025; TV5/Sari-Sari Channel)
- Lyra (1996–1997; GMA)
- Madam Chairman (2013–2014; TV5)
- Madrasta (2019–2020; GMA)
- Maging Sino Ka Man (2006–2007; ABS-CBN)
  - Maging Sino Ka Man: Ang Pagbabalik (2007–2008; ABS-CBN)
- Magkaagaw (2019–2021; GMA)
- Magkano Ba ang Pag-ibig? (2013–2014; GMA)
- Mangarap Ka (2004; ABS-CBN)
- Mara Clara (1992–1997; ABS-CBN)
  - Mara Clara (2010–2011; ABS-CBN)
- Maria la del Barrio (2011–2012; ABS-CBN)
- Marimar (2007–2008; GMA)
  - Marimar (2015–2016; GMA)
- Marinella (1999–2001; ABS-CBN)
- May Bukas Pa (2000; IBC, 2000–2001; RPN)
  - May Bukas Pa (2009–2010; ABS-CBN)
- Meant to Be (2017; GMA)
- Mga Anghel na Walang Langit (2005–2006; ABS-CBN)
- Mga Basang Sisiw (2013; GMA)
- Mga Batang Riles (2025; GMA/GTV)
- Mia Gracia (1996–1997; GMA)
- Minsan Lang Kita Iibigin (2011; ABS-CBN)
- Mommy Dearest (2025; GMA)
- Mula sa Puso (1997–1999; ABS-CBN)
  - Mula sa Puso (2011; ABS-CBN)
- Mundo Man ay Magunaw (2012; ABS-CBN)
- Mundo Mo'y Akin (2013; GMA)
- Munting Heredera (2011–2012; GMA)
- My Bespren Emman (2026; TV5/Sari-Sari Channel/One PH/All TV/A2Z/Kapamilya Channel)
- My Binondo Girl (2011–2012; ABS-CBN)
- My Korean Jagiya (2017–2018; GMA)
- My Special Tatay (2018–2019; GMA)
- Nag-aapoy na Damdamin (2023–2024; Kapamilya Channel/A2Z/TV5)
- Nang Ngumiti ang Langit (2019; ABS-CBN)
- Narito ang Puso Ko (2003–2004; GMA)
- Nathaniel (2015; ABS-CBN)
- Ngayon at Kailanman (2018–2019; ABS-CBN)
- Niña Niño (2021–2022; TV5)
  - Ang Himala ni Niño (2024–2025; TV5)
- Ningning (2015–2016; ABS-CBN)
- Oh My G! (2015; ABS-CBN)
- On the Wings of Love (2015–2016; ABS-CBN)
- Onanay (2018–2019; GMA)
- Pamilya Ko (2019–2020; ABS-CBN)
- Pamilya Sagrado (2024; Kapamilya Channel/A2Z/TV5/Jeepney TV/iWantTFC)
- Pangako Sa 'Yo (2000–2002; ABS-CBN)
  - Pangako sa 'Yo (2015–2016; ABS-CBN)
- Pari 'Koy (2015; GMA)
- Pasión de Amor (2015–2016; ABS-CBN)
- Pieta (2008–2009; ABS-CBN)
- Pira-Pirasong Paraiso (2023–2024; Kapamilya Channel/A2Z/TV5)
- Playhouse (2018–2019; ABS-CBN)
- Prima Donnas (2019–2021, 2022; GMA)
- Princess and I (2012–2013; ABS-CBN)
- Princess in the Palace (2015–2016; GMA)
- Prinsesa ng Banyera (2007–2008; ABS-CBN)
- Prinsesa ng City Jail (2025; GMA)
- Pulang Araw (2024; GMA/GTV/Pinoy Hits/Netflix)
- Recuerdo de Amor (2001–2003; ABS-CBN)
- Reputasyon (2011–2012; ABS-CBN)
- ReTox: 2 Be Continued (2023; ABS-CBN Entertainment)
- Rio Del Mar (1999–2001; GMA)
- Rosalinda (2009; GMA)
- Rosalka (2010; ABS-CBN)
- Rubi (2010; ABS-CBN)
- Sa Dulo ng Walang Hanggan (2001–2003; ABS-CBN)
- Sa Piling Mo (2006; ABS-CBN)
- Sa Piling ni Nanay (2016–2017; GMA)
- Sa Puso Ko, Iingatan Ka (2001–2003; ABS-CBN)
- Saan Ka Man Naroroon (1999–2001; ABS-CBN)
- Saang Sulok ng Langit (2005; GMA)
- Sana ay Ikaw na Nga (2001–2003; GMA)
  - Sana ay Ikaw na Nga (2012–2013; GMA)
- Sana Dalawa ang Puso (2018; ABS-CBN)
- Sana'y Wala Nang Wakas (2003–2004; ABS-CBN)
- Sandugo (2019–2020; ABS-CBN)
- Sanggang-Dikit FR (2025–2026; GMA/GTV)
- Sarah the Teen Princess (2004; ABS-CBN)
- Sigabo (2026–present; Kapamilya Channel/A2Z/All TV/TV5)
- Sins of the Father (2025; Kapamilya Channel/A2Z/TV5/Jeepney TV/iWant)
- Taskforce Firewall (2026–present; GMA/GTV/Heart of Asia/I Heart Movies)
- Tayong Dalawa (2009; ABS-CBN)
- Te Amo, Maging Sino Ka Man (2004; GMA)
- Temptation of Wife (2012–2013; GMA)
- The Blood Sisters (2018; ABS-CBN)
- The Broken Marriage Vow (2022; Kapamilya Channel/A2Z/TV5/Jeepney TV/Viu)
- The General's Daughter (2019; ABS-CBN)
- The Gift (2019–2020; GMA)
- The Good Son (2017–2018; ABS-CBN)
- The Greatest Love (2016–2017; ABS-CBN)
- The Half Sisters (2014–2016; GMA)
- The Iron Heart (2022–2023; Kapamilya Channel/A2Z/TV5/Jeepney TV)
- The Master Cutter (2026–present; GMA/GTV/Netflix/Heart of Asia/I Heart Movies)
- The Stepdaughters (2018; GMA)
- Till I Met You (2016–2017; ABS-CBN)
- Trops (2016–2017; GMA)
- Tubig at Langis (2016; ABS-CBN)
- Twin Hearts (2003–2004; GMA)
- Two Wives (2014–2015; ABS-CBN)
- Unbreak My Heart (2023; GMA/GTV/I Heart Movies/Pinoy Hits/iWantTFC/Viu)
- Vietnam Rose (2005–2006; ABS-CBN)
- Villa Quintana (1995–1997; GMA)
  - Villa Quintana (2013–2014; GMA)
- Viral Scandal (2021–2022; Kapamilya Channel/A2Z/TV5/Jeepney TV)
- Walang Hanggang Paalam (2020–2021; Kapamilya Channel/A2Z/TV5/Jeepney TV)
- What Lies Beneath (2025–2026; Kapamilya Channel/A2Z/TV5/Jeepney TV/Netflix/iWant, 2026; All TV)
- Widows' War (2024–2025; GMA/GTV, 2024; Pinoy Hits)
- Wildflower (2017–2018; ABS-CBN)
- Yagit (1983–1985; GMA)
  - Yagit (2014–2015; GMA)
- Ysabella (2007–2008; ABS-CBN)

== Sports ==
- A Round of Golf (2008–2015; Solar Sports)
- ABP Touchdown (2015; IBC)
- ABU Sports (2025–present; PTV)
- Activating Sports (2016–2020; Inquirer 990 Television)
- Adidas Sports Update (ABC)
- Aksyon Sports (2011–2019; AksyonTV, 2019–2020; One PH)
- AKTV Sports Live (2011; IBC/AksyonTV)
- Astig PBA (2007–2008; ABC)
- Astig! (2010–2011, 2012–2014; TV5, 2011–2013; IBC, 2011–2014; AksyonTV)
- ATC E-Sports Highlights (2019–2020; IBC)
- Auto Extreme (2002–2007; RPN)
- Auto Focus (1998–2005; PTV/NBN, 2007–present; Solar Sports)
- Badminton Extreme (Studio 23)
- Bakbakan Na (2013–2017; IBC, 2017–2020; TV5, 2020–present; One Sports)
- Basta Sports (2006; ABS-CBN)
- Beach Volleyball Republic (2015–2019; S+A)
- Beyond the Game (2025–present; Bilyonaryo News Channel)
- Bigtime Bakbakan (2011–2013; IBC)
- Body & Machine (2001–2007; RPN)
- Boxing at the Bay (2009–2015; Solar Sports)
- Buhay PBA (2007–2008; ABC)
- CBA - Pilipinas (2019–2020; IBC/Light TV)
- Chicken Talk (2016–2019; IBC, 2019; 5 Plus)
- CNN Philippines Sports Desk (2015–2024; CNN Philippines)
- Cockpihan: Usapang Sabong (2016–2020; Inquirer 990 Television)
- Custom Rides (2007; IBC)
- Eumorpho Lakas Tao (PTV)
- Extreme Games 101 (2005–2007; RPN)
- Fastbreak (2014–2020; DZMM TeleRadyo)
- Fastbreak Sports Updates (2024–2025; True FM TV/True TV)
- Filsports Basketball Association (2015; PTV, 2015–2016; AksyonTV)
- Fistorama (2002–2011; NBN, 2003–2007; RPN)
- Game! (2011–2012; GMA News TV)
- Game Na! (Studio 23)
- Game On: Isyu at Balita (2023–2024; Radyo Pilipinas 1 Television)
- Gameplan (2007; RPN, 2007–2013; Solar Sports)
- GG Blitz (2018–2019; TV5, 2019, 5 Plus)
- Golf Power (2003–2005; RPN)
- Golf Power Plus: Cantada Beach Volleyball (2005–2007; RPN, 2007–2011; NBN)
- Harbour Center Greatest Games (2011; PTV)
- Hardball (2006–2019; ANC, 2024–present; DWAN TV)
- Hataw Pinoy (2006–2011; IBC)
- Homestretch (2025–present; One News)
- Hotwire (Studio 23)
- IBC Primetime Sports (2007–2008; IBC)
- iPBA (2006–2007; ABC)
- I-Sport Lang (2019–2020; One PH)
- In This Corner (2001–2015; PTV/NBN, 2003–2007; RPN)
- IZ GameTime (2023–2026; Aliw 23, 2024–2026; DWIZ News TV)
- Jumpball (2020–2021; TV5/One PH/One Sports)
- KKK: Kabayo, Karera, Karerista (produced by Vintage Television) (1996–2001; IBC)
- Karera Sports TV (produced by Makisig Network) (2007–2008; IBC)
- Kid Sports (1992; ABC)
- Kwentong Gilas (2014–2019; TV5)
- Liga Pilipinas (2008–2009; NBN, 2009–2011; Solar Sports)
- Man & Machine (2005–2007; RPN)
- Manny Pacquiao Presents: Blow By Blow (1994–1996; PTV, 1996–1999; IBC, 2015–2016; TV5, 2022–present; One Sports, 2023–2025; Media Pilipinas TV)
- Manny Pacquiao Sports Idol (2004; IBC)
- Mano-Mano Pro Boxing (1996–1998; IBC)
- Match Point (2023–present; DZRH TV)
- MBS Sports (1981–1985; MBS)
- MBA (1998; IBC, 1998–2002; Studio 23, 1999–2002; PTV/NBN)
- MLB on City2/BBC (1984; City2/BBC)
- MLB on GTV/MBS/PTV (1977–1983, 1985–1986, 1987–1994; GTV/MBS/PTV)
- Motivated 3x3 Basketball Tournament (2024–2025; D8TV)
- Motivated Billiard League (2024–2025; D8TV)
- Motoring Today (1987–2006, 2008–2009; PTV/NBN, 1989–2005; IBC, 2009–present; Solar Sports)
- MPBL (2017–2020; S+A, 2019; ABS-CBN, 2021; A2Z, 2021–2022; IBC, 2022–2024; One PH, 2023–2024; Media Pilipinas TV, 2025–present; Solar Sports)
- National Basketball Association
  - NBA on ABC (1969–1972, 2007–2008; ABC)
  - NBA on ABS-CBN (1961–1969, 1986–1988, 2011–2019; ABS-CBN)
  - NBA on BTV (2006–2019; BTV)
  - NBA on C/S 9 (2008–2009; C/S 9)
  - NBA on CBN (1958–1961; ABS-CBN)
  - NBA on Citynet (1995–1996; Citynet Television)
  - NBA on CNN Philippines (2019–2020; CNN Philippines)
  - NBA on GMA (1988–1996; GMA)
  - NBA on IBC (2002–2004; IBC)
  - NBA on NBN (2001–2002; NBN)
  - NBA on One Sports (2020–present; One Sports)
  - NBA on RPN (2004–2007; RPN)
  - NBA on RPTV (2024–present; RPTV)
  - NBA on S+A (2014–2019; S+A)
  - NBA on Solar Sports (2002–2006; Solar Sports)
  - NBA on Solar TV (2009–2011; Solar TV)
  - NBA on Studio 23 (2011–2014; Studio 23)
  - NBA on TV5 (2020–2023; TV5)
  - NBA on VTV/Viva TV (1996–2001; IBC)
- National Basketball Conference (2004–2008; BTV)
- NBL (2018–2022; Solar Sports, 2023–2026; Aliw 23)
- NCAA (1954–1961; ABS-CBN, 1986–1995, 2000–2002; PTV/NBN, 1996–1999, 2012; IBC, 2002–2011, 2015–2020; Studio 23/S+A, 2013–2015; TV5/AksyonTV, 2021–2026; GTV, 2024–2026; Heart of Asia)
- NFL (2017–2019; TV5, 2019–2020; 5 Plus/One Sports, 2021–present; Premier Sports)
- NBN Sports (2008–2010; NBN)
- News TV All Sports (2011–2018; GMA News TV)
- NGBL - Next Generation Basketball League (2024–present; Solar Sports)
- One News Now: Sports (2023; One News)
- Pagcor Jai-Alai (2009–2010; IBC)
- PBA Classics (2006–2008; ABC)
- Philippine Basketball Association
  - PBA on A2Z (2023–2024; A2Z)
  - PBA on ABC (2004–2008; ABC)
  - PBA on AKTV (2011–2013; IBC)
  - PBA on BBC (1975–1976; BBC)
  - PBA on CNN Philippines (2024; CNN Philippines)
  - PBA on ESPN5 (2017–2020; TV5)
  - PBA on GTV (1976, 1978–1980; GTV)
  - PBA on KBS (1977; RPN)
  - PBA on MBS (1980–1981; MBS)
  - PBA on NBN/IBC (2003; NBN/IBC)
  - PBA on One PH (2023–2024; One PH)
  - PBA on One Sports (2020–2023; TV5/One Sports)
  - PBA on RPTV (2024–present; RPTV)
  - PBA on Solar Sports (2008–2011; C/S/Solar TV/Studio 23)
  - PBA on Sports5 (2013–2017; TV5)
  - PBA on TV5 (2008; TV5)
  - PBA on Vintage Sports (1982–1983; City2, 1984–1995; MBS/PTV, 1996–1999; IBC)
  - PBA on Viva TV (2000–2002; IBC)
- Philippine Basketball League (1986–1990, 1995–1999, 2000–2003; PTV/NBN, 1991–1994, 1999–2000, 2008; Islands TV 13/IBC, 2002–2003; Solar Sports, 2003–2007; Studio 23, 2007–2008; BTV, 2008–2011; C/S/Solar TV)
- Philippine Super Liga (2013–2015; Solar Sports, 2015–2016, 2018; TV5, 2015–2018; AksyonTV, 2017–2018; Hyper, 2019–2020; 5 Plus/One Sports)
- Pigeon Insider (2024–2025; D8TV)
- Pilipinas Sabong Sports (2005–2009; IBC)
- Pilipinas Super League (2022–2023; Net 25, 2023–2024; IBC)
- Pinoy Liga Next Man (2023–present; Aliw 23)
- Pinoy Wrestling (1993–2002; RJTV)
- Pitgames TV (2025–2026; One Sports, 2026-present; PTV)
- Play by Play (2024–present; One News)
- Pool Showdown (2007–2008; ABC)
- Power and Play (2018–2019; AksyonTV, 2019–present; One PH, 2024–present; RPTV/True TV, 2024; True FM TV)
- Premier Volleyball League (2017–2020; S+A, 2021–present; One Sports)
- PSC Hour (2023–2024; Radyo Pilipinas 1 Television)
- PTV Sports (2012–2016, 2017–present; PTV)
  - PTV Sports Weekend (2023–present; PTV)
- Ride Mo To (2018–2020; S+A)
- Ride PH (2019–present; One News, 2019–2020; TV5, 2019, 2020, 2022, 2023–present; One PH)
- Ringside (2004–2008; ABC, 2008–2017; Solar Sports)
- RPN Sports Library (1981–1983; RPN)
- Sabong Pilipinas (2018–2020; S+A)
- Sabong TV: Ang #1 Sabong Show ng Bayan (2005–2011, 2014–2023; IBC, 2018–2020; S+A, 2023–present; One Sports, 2011–2014; Studio 23)
- Sagupaan Global Cockfights (1999–2000, 2001–2011; IBC)
- Sagupaan TV (2011–2014; Studio 23, 2014–2020; S+A, 2020–present; One Sports)
- Salpukan 360 (2017–2018; IBC/TV5)
- San Juan Coliseum Derby Time (2005–2020; Solar Sports)
- Sargo (2007; RPN)
- Saved by the Bell (2008–2018; Solar Sports)
- SEL-J Motorsports (2010–2011; NBN, 2011–2014; Studio 23)
- Shakey's Girls Volleyball League (2023–2024; CNN Philippines)
- Shakey's Super League (2022; IBC, 2022–present; Solar Sports, 2023; Aliw 23)
- Shakey's V-League (2004–2005, 2012; IBC, 2005–2006; ABC, 2007–2011; NBN, 2013–2015; GMA News TV, 2016; S+A)
- Shakey's Girls V-League (2014–2015; PTV)
- Sharks Billards Association (2024–present; One Sports, 2025–present; PTV Sports Network/RPTV)
- Silip sa Karera (IBC)
- Sinag Liga Asya (2023–2026; Aliw 23)
- Smashing Action (2007–2016; Solar Sports)
- Snow Bomb! (2025; Bilyonaryo News Channel)
- Solar Sports Desk (2004–2007, 2012–2014; Solar Sports, 2012–2014; Solar News Channel)
- Speed by MP Turbo (1998–2007; PTV/NBN)
- Sportalakan (2025–present; Abante TV)
- Sports 37 (2007–2016; UNTV)
- Sports IQ (2016–2020; Inquirer 990 Television)
- Sports Kids (1998–2001; PTV)
- Sports News Roundup (2023–2024; Radyo Pilipinas 1 Television)
- Sports Now (2024–2025; Abante TeleTabloid, 2025–present; Abante TV)
  - Sports Now Weekend (2026–present; Abante TV)
- Sportspage (2020–2021; One PH/One Sports)
- Sports Pilipinas (2012–2014; GMA News TV)
- SportsCenter Philippines (2017–2020; TV5)
- Sports Desk (2014–2015; Solar News Channel/9TV)
- Sports Review (1991–2005; New Vision 9/RPN)
- Sports Talk (2007–2014; DZMM TeleRadyo)
- Sports U: Ikaw ang Panalo! (2015–2020; ABS-CBN/ANC/DZMM TeleRadyo/S+A, 2018–2020; Jeepney TV)
- Sports Unlimited (1997–2015; ABS-CBN, 2014–2015; S+A)
- Spotlight TV (Pinoy Xtreme, 2014; IBC)
- Starting Lineup (2024; TV5, 2025–present; One News/One Sports/RPTV)
- Stoplight TV (2009–2010; TV5)
- TKO: Tanghali Knockouts: Matira Matibay (2013–2014; GMA News TV)
- Taekwondo TV (2006–2010, Studio 23)
- Tahor: Your Ultimate Gamefowl Show (2016–2018; PTV)
- Teledyaryo Sports (2006–2008, 2010–2012; NBN/PTV)
- The Basketball Show (2004–2005; ABC, 2005–2007; RPN)
- The Chasedown (2019–2022; One PH)
- The Dive Philippines (2017–2023; UNTV)
- The Game (2020–2024; One News/One Sports)
- The Greatest Fights (1999–2001; IBC)
- The Huddle (2020–2021; One PH/One Sports)
- The Main Event (produced by Viva Sports) (2002–2003, 2008–2013; IBC)
- The Nationals (2019–2022; 5 Plus/One Sports)
- The Score (2014–2020; S+A)
- The Scorecard (2024–present; Bilyonaryo News Channel)
- The Sports List (2005–2007; NBN)
- Thunderbird Sabong Nation (2013–2014; Studio 23, 2014–2017; IBC, 2017–2019; S+A, 2019–2020; TV5, 2020–present; One Sports)
- Tilaok TV (2019–2020; IBC)
- Tukaan at Kabuhayan (1998–2017; IBC, 2017–2020; TV5, 2020–2025; One Sports)
- UAAP (1975–1984; BBC, 1979–1988; IBC, 1989–1994; RPN/New Vision 9, 1994–1999; PTV, 2000–2020; Studio 23/S+A, 2021–present; One Sports)
- Universities and Colleges Basketball League (2016–2017; IBC)
- UNTV Cup (2013–present; UNTV)
- UNTV Volleyball League (2023–present; UNTV)
- Unlimited Diving (2003–2009; NBN)
- United Football League (2011–2013; IBC)
- Unity League (2024; PTV/IBC)
- Versus (2008–2015; Solar Sports)
- Walang Bolahan (2026–present; Aliw 23/DWIZ News TV)
- Who's Next? Pro-Boxing Series (2016–2017; GMA News TV)
- Women's Maharlika Pilipinas Basketball League (2025; IBC, 2025–present; Solar Sports)
- Women's National Basketball League (2019–2022; Solar Sports)
- World Class Boxing (2007–2008; ABC)
- X Events (Pinoy Extreme)
- Xperience Pinoy Sports TV (2014; PTV)
- Xtreme Riders (Pinoy Extreme)
- Xtyle (Pinoy Extreme)

== Talk shows ==
- 3-in-1 (2015; ABS-CBN)
- Abantelliling (2025–present; Abante TV)
- Actually, Yun Na! (1994–1996; New Vision 9/RPN)
- Ah-Eh-Minin (2024–2025; Abante TeleTabloid, 2025–present; Abante TV)
- Alam na Dis! (2025–present; DZMM TeleRadyo/PRTV Prime Media)
- All About You (2003–2004; GMA)
- Ang Latest (2012–2013; TV5)
- Anim na Dekada... Nag-iisang Vilma (2023; Kapamilya Channel/A2Z)
- Anong Say Mo, Mare? (1985–1988; GMA)
- Aquino & Abunda Tonight (2014–2015; ABS-CBN)
- Ariel con Tina (1972–1974; RBS)
- At the Moment (2022–2025; ANC)
- Bar Note (1988; ABS-CBN)
- Basta Every Day Happy (2014–2015; GMA)
- Beyond the Exchange with Rico Hizon (2024–present; ANC)
- Bongga Ka Jhai (2023–2025; TeleRadyo Serbisyo, 2024–present; Prime TV/PRTV Prime Media, 2025–present; DZMM TeleRadyo)
- Boy & Kris (2007–2009; ABS-CBN)
- Brunch with Bing and Michelle (1998–1999; GMA)
- Buzz ng Bayan (2013–2014; ABS-CBN)
- Call Me Papa Jack (2015; TV5)
- Celebrations (2002; IBC)
- CelebriTV (2015–2016; GMA)
- Celebrity DAT Com (2003–2004; IBC)
- Celebrity Top 10 (2020–2023, One News/One PH)
- Celebrity Turns with Junie Lee and Lani Misalucha (2003–2004; GMA)
- Channel S (1995–1997; GMA)
- Chika, Besh! (2020–2021; TV5)
- Chika Vlog (2026–present; Aliw 23/DWIZ News TV)
- Chikadoras (2024–2025; Abante TeleTabloid)
- Chikka Mo, Chikka Ko (2004–2008, UNTV)
- ChisMax: Chismis to the Max! (2009–2020; DZMM TeleRadyo)
- Chizmax to the Max (2026–present; Aliw 23/DWIZ News TV)
- Cinemascoop (1988; ABS-CBN)
- Cinema Scoop (1996–1997; IBC)
- Cafe Bravo (1989; ABS-CBN)
- Cristy FerMinute (2011–2019; AksyonTV, 2019–present; One PH, 2024; True FM TV, 2024–present; True TV)
- Cristy Per Minute (1995–2000; ABS-CBN)
- D! Day (1999–2001; GMA)
- D’Showbiz Authority (2025–present; DWAN TV)
- Daigdig ng mga Artista sa Telebisyon (1984–1987; GMA)
- Daily Chikahan (2014–2016; CLTV)
- Dina (1988–1989; ABS-CBN)
- Dong Puno Live (1995–2000, 2003–2005; ABS-CBN)
- Dream Maker Pause and Play (2023; PIE Channel)
- DZRH Showbiz Spotted (2020–2021; DZRH News Television)
- Enterrr JJ (1976–1978; IBC)
- Entertainment Konek (2005–2006; ABS-CBN)
- Entertainment Live (2007–2012; ABS-CBN)
- E.P.A.L: Eto Pala Ang Latest! (2024–2025; DWAN TV)
- E.S.P. Atbp. (IBC)
- ETChing: Entertainment Today with Lyn Ching (1996–1998; GMA)
- Eye to Eye (1988–1996; GMA)
- EyeSpotted (2023; Aliw 23, 2025–2026; DWIZ News TV)
- Face the Nation (GNN/One Media)
- Face the People (2013–2014; TV5)
- Face to Face (2010–2013; TV5)
  - Face 2 Face (2023–2024; TV5/One PH)
  - Face to Face: Harapan (2024–2026; TV5/One PH)
  - Face to Face with Ate Koring (2026–present; TV5/RPTV/All TV/Kapamilya Channel)
- Fast Talk with Boy Abunda (2023–present; GMA, 2023–2024; Pinoy Hits)
- Friday Night at the Movies (1980; IBC)
- Full Time Moms (2009–2011; Q)
- Gabe Me a Break (2006–2007; Q)
- Gandang Gabi Vice (2011–2020; ABS-CBN, 2026–present; GMA)
- Good Morning Girls (2013–2014; TV5)
- Good Morning, Kris (2004; ABS-CBN)
- Good Morning Misis! (1996–1999; RPN)
- Good Morning Showbiz (1987–1991; GMA)
- Happy Wife, Happy Life (2015; TV5)
- Hawak Mo Ang Beat: Legis Recap (2026–present; D8TV)
- Headstart with Karen Davila (2010–present; ANC, 2020; DZMM TeleRadyo/S+A)
  - Hot Copy (2010–present; ANC)
- Hollywood Nights (1996–1997; IBC)
- Homeboy (2005–2007; ABS-CBN)
- H.O.T. TV: Hindi Ordinaryong Tsismis (2012–2013; GMA)
- IBC Nightline (IBC)
- In the Limelight (2011; GMA News TV)
- Inay Ko Po! (2019–present; One PH, 2024–present; True FM TV/True TV)
- Inside Showbiz (1995–1997; GMA)
- Iskovery Nights (2023; Isko Moreno)
- It's My Life with Troy Montero (2011; IBC)
- Jazz Girls (2026–present; D8TV)
- Jigo Live! (2024–2025; Abante TeleTabloid, 2025–present; Abante TV)
- Jojo A. All the Way! (2004–2007; RJTV, 2009–2010; TV5)
- Juicy! (2008–2012; TV5)
- Julie (1997–2001; ABS-CBN)
- Julius and Tintin: Para sa Pamilyang Pilipino (2022–present; One PH)
- Julius Babao Unplugged (2024–present; One PH/TV5)
- K Na Tayo! (2007; RPN)
- Katok Mga Misis (1995–1998; GMA)
- Kay Susan Tayo sa Super Radyo DZBB (2019–2020; GMA News TV)
- Kaya mo Yan! (2019–present; DZRH News Television/DZRH TV)
- KKK (2016–2018, 2021–present; DZRH News Television/DZRH TV)
- Klik na Klik sa Trese (1997–1998; IBC)
- Kontrobersyal (2003–2006; ABS-CBN)
- Kris TV (2011–2016; ABS-CBN)
- Kuan on One (2024−present; iWantTFC/iWant/ABS-CBN Entertainment/Kapamilya Channel/A2Z, 2026–present; All TV)
- Kumustar Ka (2021–2023; TeleRadyo/Jeepney TV)
- Kuwentuhan Pa More (2017−2020; Inquirer 990 Television)
- Kwento Nights (2025–2026; DZMM TeleRadyo)
- Lakwatsika (2022; TV5)
- Let’s Talk (2016–2020; Inquirer 990 Television)
- Love Hotline (2013–2014; GMA News TV, 2014–2016; GMA)
- Love ni Mister, Love ni Misis (2010–2011; GMA)
- LSS: The Martin Nievera Show (2018–2024; ANC)
- Magandang ARAw (2023–present; Net 25)
- Magandang Buhay (2016–2020; ABS-CBN, 2020–2026; Kapamilya Channel/A2Z, 2023–2024; TV5, 2024–2026; All TV/Jeepney TV)
- Magandang Morning with Julius and Tintin (2007–2011; DZMM TeleRadyo)
  - Magandang Morning with Julius and Niña (2011–2015; DZMM TeleRadyo)
  - Magandang Morning with Julius and Zen (2015–2020; DZMM TeleRadyo, 2020; ANC/TeleRadyo)
- Mag-Usap Tayo with Ms. Malou (DZRH News Television)
- Maiba Naman (1981–1985; GMA)
- Maiba Naman with Didi Domingo (1994–1995; IBC)
- Make My Day with Larry Henares (2002–2020; UNTV)
- Manila Conversations (2024–present; Aliw 23)
- Mano-Mano ni Anthony Taberna (2012–2013; Studio 23)
- Marisol Academy (2024–2025; Abante TeleTabloid, 2025–present; Abante TV)
  - Marisol Academy Tonite (2024–2025; Abante TeleTabloid, 2025–present; Abante TV)
- Marites University (2023; MU Entertainment, 2024; All TV)
- Mars (2012–2019; GMA News TV)
  - Mars Pa More (2019–2022; GMA)
- Martin After Dark (1988–1993; GMA, 1993–1998; ABS-CBN)
- Martin Late at Nite (1998–2003; ABS-CBN)
  - Martin Late at Night (2013; ABS-CBN)
- Master Showman Presents (GMA)
- Match Made! (2024–present; One PH/True FM TV/True TV)
- Matteo G. Primetime (2026–present; Bilyonaryo News Channel)
- Mel & Jay (1989–1996; ABS-CBN)
- Mel & Joey (2004–2011; GMA)
- Misis of the 80's (1987–1988; ABS-CBN)
- Mismo (2011–2017; DZMM TeleRadyo)
- Moments (2007–2024; Net 25)
- Moms (2005–2009; QTV/Q)
- M.O.M.S — Mhies on a Mission (2022–2025; All TV)
- Monday Night with Edu (1987; ABS-CBN)
- Morning Brew (IBC)
- Morning Girls (2002–2003; ABS-CBN)
  - Morning Girls with Kris and Korina (2003–2004; ABS-CBN)
- Morning Star (2004–2005; ABS-CBN)
- Movie Magazine (1987–1995; GMA)
- Mula sa Edukador (2019; IBC)
- Ms. D! (1996–1999; GMA)
- Ms. Ellaneous (1977–1981; GMA)
- Negosyo Goals (2023; All TV, 2024; GTV)
- Newsmaker (2020; GMA News TV)
- Night Life with Sister L (2021–2025; DZRH News Television/DZRH TV)
- Night Lines (2000–2001; IBC)
- Not So Late Night With Edu (1985–1987; GMA, 1987–1989; ABS-CBN)
- Ogie Diaz Inspires (2026–present; TV5)
- Oh My Gan! (2026–present; A2Z/Kapamilya Channel, 2026; All TV)
- Oh No! It's Johnny! (1987–1999; ABS-CBN)
- OMJ! (2013–2020; DZMM TeleRadyo)
- Overthoughts Podcast with Sam and Joe (2024–2025; DWAN TV)
- Paparazzi (2010–2012; TV5)
- Pare & Pare (2012; GMA)
- Parekoy (2024–2025; Abante TeleTabloid, 2025–present; Abante TV)
- Partners Mel and Jay (1996–2004; GMA)
- Partners with Mel Tiangco (2004; GMA)
- People (IBC)
- Personalan (2011–2013; GMA News TV)
- PG (Parents Guide) (1996–1999; GMA)
- Pilipinas Ngayon (2002–2003; IBC)
- Pillow Talk (1996–1998; IBC)
- Power House (2011–2014; GMA News TV, 2014–2016; GMA)
- Premiere Night (IBC)
- Private Conversations with Boy Abunda (2000–2006; ANC)
- Profiles of Power (1990–1996; GMA)
- Rated E (1996–1998; GMA)
- Real People (1981–1985; GMA)
- Real Talk (2015–2017; CNN Philippines)
- Regal Showbiz Eye (1987–1988; IBC)
- Round Table (2023–present; One News)
- Ruffa & Ai (2009; ABS-CBN)
- Rumors: Facts and Humors (1987–1988; ABS-CBN)
- S-Files (1998–2007; GMA)
- S2: Showbiz Sabado (2003; ABS-CBN)
- Scene. Zone (2023–present; DZRH TV)
- Scoop (1986–1987; IBC)
- See True (1980–1986; IBC, 1986–1987; GMA)
- Seeing Stars with Joe Quirino (1972–1983; IBC)
- Serbisyong Bayan (IBC)
- Sexy Time (2024–2025; Abante TeleTabloid)
- Sharon (1998–2004, 2006–2010; ABS-CBN)
- Sharon: Kasama Mo, Kapatid (2012–2013; TV5)
- She (1981–1985, 2000–2005; PTV/NBN)
- She Said, She Said (2010–2012; NBN/PTV)
- Show & Tell (1994–1995; GMA)
- Show Best (2025–present; Abante TV)
- Showbiz Central (2007–2012; GMA)
- Showbiz Exclusives (2011–2012; GMA News TV)
- Showbiz Extra (2007; DZMM TeleRadyo)
- Showbiz Eye (1988–1989; IBC)
- Showbiz FM (2011–2019; AksyonTV, 2019–2020; One PH)
- Showbiz Inside Report (2012–2013; ABS-CBN)
- Showbiz Ka! (2007; RPN)
- Showbiz Konek na Konek (2015; TV5)
- Showbiz Lingo (1992–1999; ABS-CBN)
- Showbiz Live (2016–2020; Inquirer 990 Television)
- Showbiz Mismo (2007–2011; DZMM TeleRadyo)
- Showbiz na Showbiz (1986–1987; ABS-CBN, 2025–2026; Aliw 23/DWIZ News TV)
- Showbiz No. 1 (2004–2005; ABS-CBN)
- Showbiz Overtime! (2025; Abante TeleTabloid)
- Showbiz Pa More! (2018–2021; Jeepney TV)
  - Showbiz Play Pa More (2021–2022; Jeepney TV)
- Showbiz Police: Intriga Under Arrest (2013–2014; TV5)
- Showbiz Pulis (2025–present; Abante TV)
- Showbiz sa IZ (2022–2023; IZTV/Aliw 23)
- Showbiz Sidelines (2024–2025; TeleRadyo Serbisyo/Prime TV/PRTV Prime Media)
- Showbiz Spotted (2024–present; Aliw 23)
- Showbiz Stripped (2005–2007; GMA)
- Showbiz Talk Ganern (2016–present; DZRH News Television/DZRH TV)
- Showbiz Talk with Morly Alinio (2007–present; TV Natin/RHTV/DZRH News Television/DZRH TV)
- Showbiz Talkies (1994–1996; IBC)
- Showbiz Unlimited (2015; IBC)
- Showbuzz (2017–2020; DZMM TeleRadyo)
- Simply KC (2010; ABS-CBN)
- Sine Silip (1991–1992; Islands TV 13)
- Sine Sine (1988; ABS-CBN)
- Sis (2001–2010; GMA)
- SNN: Showbiz News Ngayon (2009–2011; ABS-CBN)
- Solved na Solved (2015; TV5)
- Spotlight with Andy Alviz (CLTV)
- Spotlight with Sister L (2025–present; DZRH TV)
- SST Talk Show (1993–1995; GMA)
- ST: Showbiz Tsismis (2008–2014; RHTV/DZRH News Television)
  - STL: Showbiz Tsismis Live! (2014–2017; DZRH News Television)
- Star Box (2011; GMA)
- Star Ka (2024–present; Jeepney TV)
- Stars & Spies (1994–1995; IBC)
- Startalk (1995–2015; GMA)
- Stop, Look & Listen (1983–1986; GMA)
- Storycon (2024–present; One News, 2026–present; True TV)
- Sunrise sa Tanghali (IBC)
- Talakayan ng Bayan (IBC)
- Talk Toons (2007; RPN, 2008; IBC)
- Tamang Kwentuhan (2024–2025; Abante TeleTabloid, 2025–present; Abante TV)
- Tambayan (2015–present; DZRH News Television/DZRH TV)
- Teen Talk (1992–1995; GMA)
- TeleBabe (2025–present; Abante TV)
- Tell the People (1983–1997; RPN/New Vision 9)
  - Tell The People... Now (1997; RPN)
- Teysi ng Tahanan (1991–1997; ABS-CBN)
  - Teysi (2003–2004; ABS-CBN)
- The Baby O' Brien Show (1963–1972; ABS-CBN)
- The Buzz (1999–2013, 2014–2015; ABS-CBN)
- The Good Night Show (2008; Q)
- The Kris Aquino Show (1996; GMA)
- The Lolas' Beautiful Show (2017–2018; GMA)
- The Medyo Late Night Show with Jojo A. (2010–2013, 2015; TV5, 2014; GMA, 2018; PTV, 2020, 2023–present; RJTV)
- The Medyo Serious Talk Show (2024–present; One News)
- The Rafael Yabut Show (1961–1972; RBS)
- The Ricky Lo Exclusives (2007–2009; Q)
- The Ryzza Mae Show (2013–2015; GMA)
- The Sobrang Gud Nite Show with Jojo A. All the Way! (2007–2008; Q)
- The Tim Yap Show (2013–2015; GMA)
- The Truth and Nothing But (2000–2002; RPN)
- The Sweet Life (2007–2011; Q)
- The View from Manila (2023–present; One News)
- Thought Leaders with Cathy Yang (2023–present; One News)
- Tik Talks (2022–2024, 2026–present; TV5, 2022–2024; One News/One PH)
- Today with Kris Aquino (1996–2001; ABS-CBN)
- Toni (2022–2023; All TV)
  - Toni Talks (2022; All TV)
- Tonight with Arnold Clavio (2010–2011; Q, 2011–2020; GMA News TV)
- Tonight with Boy Abunda (2015–2020; ABS-CBN)
- TrendJing (2026–present; DZMM TeleRadyo/PRTV Prime Media)
- Tweetbiz Insiders (2009–2011; Q, 2011; GMA News TV)
  - Tweetbiz: The Bizniz of Chizmiz (2009; Q)
- Two for the Road (1979–1986; GMA)
- Usap Tayo: Super Kwentuhan with Mark and Susan! (2020–2021; GMA News TV)
- Usapang Lasing (2024–2025; Abante TeleTabloid)
- Usapang Real Life (2020–2021; TV5)
- Wasak (2011–2016; AksyonTV)
- What's Up Doods? (2013; TV5)
- Wow It’s Showbiz (2016–2020; Inquirer 990 Television)
- XYZ Young Women's TV (1996–1998; PTV)
- Yan ang Morning! (2016; GMA)
- Ziff O Clock (2023; Aliw 23)

== Travel shows ==
- #BecomingFilipino: Your Travel Blog (2016–present; ANC)
- ASEAN @ 50: Historical Milestones (2018–2022; PTV)
- ASEAN National Attractions (2023–2025; PTV)
- Asian Air Safari (2006–present; ANC)
- Beautiful Batangas (2011; NBN)
- Biyahe ni Drew (2013–present; GMA News TV/GTV, 2020, 2024; GMA)
- Biyahe TV (2008–2015; RHTV/DZRH News Television)
- Biyaheng Bulilit (2009–2010; TV5, 2010–2014; Studio 23)
- Biyaheng Langit (2000–2007; RPN, 2007–2013; IBC, 2013–2019; PTV, 2019–2022; RJ DigiTV, 2025–present; Bilyonaryo News Channel)
- Biyahero (2013–2014; PTV)
- Buhay Abroad (2018; PTV)
- Business Flight (2014–2018; GMA News TV)
- Cooltura (2011–2012, 2019–2020, 2025–present; IBC)
- Galing Pook (2013–present; ANC)
- How 'Bout My Place (1999–2004; RPN, 2004–2006; ABC)
- I Heart PH (2019–2023; CNN Philippines, 2024–present; GTV)
- I Love Pinas (2011–2017; GMA News TV/Light TV)
- ITravel Pinas (2017–2018; PTV, 2018–2019; GMA News TV)
- Lakbay Pinas (2014; PTV)
- Lakbayin ang Magandang Pilipinas (2003–2024; NBN/PTV)
- Lakwatseros (2015; GMA News TV)
- Landmarks (2008–present; Net 25)
- Like Pinas (2017–2018; PTV, 2018–2019; GMA News TV)
- Managing Asia (2007–2016; ANC)
- Me and My Town (2018; GMA News TV)
- Neighbours (2008–2011; NBN)
- Pinoy T.A.L.K. (Travel, Adventure, Leisure, Knowledge) (2011–2012; NBN/PTV)
- ResTOURant (2024–present; IBC)
- Road Trip (2002–2005; RPN)
- Road Trip (2017–2018; GMA)
- Sacred Monuments of Asia (2019–2023; PTV)
- The Isla Hour (2002–2006; NBN)
- Travel and Trade (2001–2002; IBC)
- Travel ni Ahwel (2023–2025; TeleRadyo Serbisyo, 2024–present; Prime TV/PRTV Prime Media, 2025–present; DZMM TeleRadyo)
- Travel: Philippines (2002–2004; IBC)
- Travel Time (1986–1989; IBC, 1989–1998; GMA, 1998–2007; Studio 23, 2007–2015; ANC)
- Travel Well (2022–2023; IZTV/Aliw 23)
- Trip na Trip (2006–2011; ABS-CBN)
- Tripinas (2015; GMA News TV)
- Weekend Getaway (2011–2013; GMA News TV)
- What I See (2013–2015; Solar News Channel/9TV/CNN Philippines)
- W.O.W.: What's On Weekend (2005–2007; RPN, 2006–2008; ABC)
- Wonderful Pinas (2024–present; UNTV)
- World of Wonders (2019–2023; PTV)

== Variety shows ==
- 'Sang Linggo nAPO Sila (1995–1998; ABS-CBN)
- 12 O’ Clock High (1972; ABS-CBN)
- A Little Night of Music (1989–2002; GMA)
- Aawitan Kita (1977–1997; RPN/New Vision 9, 1997–2001; GMA, 2002–2006; ABC)
- ABS-CBN Christmas Special (airs annually, 1992–2019; ABS-CBN, 2020–present; Kapamilya Channel/A2Z, 2022; TV5)
- Afternoon Delight (1988–1989; ABS-CBN)
- Aja Aja Tayo! (2018–2019; TV5)
  - Aja Aja Tayo! sa Jeju (2021; Kapamilya Channel/A2Z)
- Aksyon, Komedya, Drama ATBP. (1993–1998; New Vision 9/RPN)
- Alas Dose sa Trese (1999–2000; IBC)
- All-Out Sundays (2020–present; GMA, 2021, 2022–2023; GTV, 2022–2023; Heart of Asia/I Heart Movies, 2023–2024; Pinoy Hits)
- An Evening with Raoul (2017; IBC)
- Apat na Sikat (1975–1981; IBC)
- Ariel con Tina (1972–1974; RBS)
- ASAP (1995–2020; ABS-CBN, 2003; Studio 23, 2018, 2019–present; Jeepney TV, 2020–present; Kapamilya Channel/Metro Channel/A2Z, 2021–2025, 2026–present; TV5, 2026–present; All TV)
  - aka: ASAP Mania, ASAP '05, ASAP '06, ASAP '07, ASAP '08, ASAP '09, ASAP XV, ASAP Rocks, ASAP 2012, ASAP 18, ASAP 19, ASAP 20, ASAP Natin 'To, ASAP XP
  - ASAP Fanatic (2004–2006; ABS-CBN)
- ASK TV: Artihan, Sayawan at Kantahan (2018–2020; IBC)
- Balik-Ligaya (1975–1977; IBC)
- Barkada sa 9 (1977–1980; RPN)
- Bongga! (1999–2007; GMA Iloilo)
- Big Ike's Happening (1975–1983; RPN)
- Biz Show Na 'To! (2007; RPN)
- By Request (2000–2004; ABC, 2009–2011; IBC)
- Carmen on Camera (1968–1972; ABC)
- Chibugan Na! (1994–1996; New Vision 9/RPN)
- Chinese Variety Show (1996–2003; ABC)
- Chowtime Na! (2005; IBC)
  - Chowtime Na! Laban Na! (2005–2006; IBC)
  - Chowtime: Conquest (2006; IBC)
- Club TV (2005; ABC)
- Coke Studio Philippines (2017; TV5, 2018–2019; ABS-CBN)
- D.A.T.S. (1996; GMA)
- Dance-O-Rama (1963–1972; ABC)
- Dance Upon A Time with Becky Garcia (1993–1997; RJTV)
- Eat Bulaga! (1979–1989; RPN, 1989–1995; ABS-CBN, 1995–2024; GMA, 2024–present; TV5/RPTV, 2024; CNN Philippines, 2025–present; Kapatid Channel)
  - E.A.T. (2023–2024; TV5/BuKo Channel, 2023; One PH)
- Eezy Dancing (1996–2002; ABC)
- Esep Esep (1999; ABS-CBN)
- Everybody, Sing! (2021–present; Kapamilya Channel/A2Z, 2022–present; TV5, 2026–present; All TV)
- Fan*tastik (2011; TV5)
- Fantastik Jeanne in Motion (1970–1976; KBS/RPN)
- Flex (2021; GTV)
- For Men Only (1968–1972; ABC)
- Full House Tonight (2017; GMA)
- Game 'N Go (2012–2013; TV5)
- GMA New Year's Eve Countdown Special (airs annually)
- GMA Supershow (1978–1997; GMA)
- Good Afternoon Po... Guguluhin Namin Kayo... Salamat Po. (1977; IBC)
- Good Evening Please (1996–1997; ABC)
- Happy Time (2020–2021; Net 25)
- Happy Truck ng Bayan (2015–2016; TV5)
  - HAPPinas Happy Hour (2016; TV5)
  - Happy Truck HAPPinas (2016; TV5)
- Happy, Yipee, Yehey (2011–2012; ABS-CBN)
- Hashtag Pinoy (2015–2019; GMA News TV/Light TV)
- Helen (1966–1970; ABC)
- Hey It's Saberdey! (2011–2012; TV5)
- I Laugh Sabado (2010–2011; Q)
- It's Chowtime (2004–2005; IBC)
- It's Your Lucky Day (2023; Kapamilya Channel/A2Z/Jeepney TV/GTV)
- Ituloy Ang Saya! (1971–1972; ABC)
- Jukebox Jamboree (1974–1976; GMA)
- Kalatog Pinggan (1987–1988; ABS-CBN)
- Kalatog sa Trese (1988–1989; IBC)
- Kesayasaya (2020–2021; Net 25)
- Klik na Klik sa Trese (1997–2001; IBC)
- KSP: Kapamilya Sabado Party (2005–2007; ABS-CBN Davao)
- Kumpletos Recados (1976–1978; RPN)
- Kuyaw! (2005–2008; GMA Davao)
- La Salle Night on a Blue Monday (2019; RJ DigiTV)
- Last Full Show (1999–2003; PTV/NBN)
- Let's Dance with Becky Garcia (1996–1998; RPN)
- Let's Get Aww (2005–2006; QTV)
- Letters & Music (2012–present; Net 25)
- Lotlot & Friends (1985–1988; RPN)
- Loveliness (1987–1988; ABS-CBN, 1988–1990; IBC)
- Lunch Break (1974–1975; GMA)
- Lunch Break (2000–2003; IBC)
- Lunch Date (1986–1993; GMA)
- Lunch Out Loud (2020–2022; TV5, 2020–2021; Colours)
  - Tropang LOL (2022–2023; Kapamilya Channel/A2Z/TV5)
- Magandang Tanghali (1965–1968; ABS-CBN, 1976–1977; RPN)
- Manilyn Live! (1990–1991; RPN)
- Marian (2014; GMA)
- Maricel Live (1986; IBC, 1986–1988; RPN)
- May I Sing To You (1966–1969; ABC)
- MINT: Music Interactive (2005; QTV)
- MMS: My Music Station (2005–2007; QTV/Q)
- M.R.S. (Most Requested Show) (2005; ABS-CBN)
- MTB (1998–2005; ABS-CBN)
  - Magandang Tanghali Bayan (1998–2003; ABS-CBN)
  - Masayang Tanghali Bayan (2003–2004; ABS-CBN)
  - MTB Ang Saya Saya! (2004–2005; ABS-CBN)
- Music Bureau (1993–1998; ABC)
- Musical Moment with Cris Cadiang (2015–2016, 2017; CLTV)
- Nestle Special (1985–1986; BBC, 1986–1987; ABS-CBN)
- Noontime Showtime (1987–1988; IBC)
- On D'Spot (2004–2006; RPN)
- Pipwede (1977–1980; RPN)
- P.O.5 (2010–2011; TV5)
- P.O.P.S.: Pops On Primetime Saturday (1992–1996; ABC)
- Party Pilipinas (2010–2013; GMA)
- Pilipinas Win Na Win (2010; ABS-CBN)
- R.S.V.P. (1991–1995; GMA)
- Regal Family (1989–1990; IBC)
- Rush TV (2007–2008; Studio 23)
- Ryan Ryan Musikahan (1988–1995; ABS-CBN)
- Sa Linggo nAPO Sila (1989–1995; ABS-CBN)
- Sabado Barkada (2003–2007; ABS-CBN Bacolod)
- Sabado Boys (2007; RPN, 2009–2010; TV5)
- Sabado Jam (1997–1999; ABS-CBN Davao)
- Sabado Live! (1998–1999; ABS-CBN)
- Sabado Na Gyud (1997–2005; ABS-CBN Cebu)
- Saturday Nite Live (1990–1991; IBC/Islands TV 13)
- SayaBadabaDoo! (1999–2003; ABS-CBN Davao)
- SBD Jam (2003–2005; ABS-CBN Davao)
- Show Up: Ang Bagong Game Show ng Bayan (2012–2013; PTV)
- Showtime (2009–2012; ABS-CBN)
  - It's Showtime (2012–2020; ABS-CBN, 2012; Studio 23, 2018–2024; Jeepney TV, 2020–present; Kapamilya Channel/A2Z, 2022–2023; TV5, 2023–2024; GTV, 2024–present; GMA/All TV)
- SMAC Pinoy Ito! (2019; IBC)
- Small Brothers (1990–1991; ABS-CBN)
- SOP (1997–2010; GMA)
  - SOP Gigsters (2004–2006; GMA)
- SST: Salo-Salo Together (1993–1995; GMA)
- Stage One: The Starstruck Playhouse (2004; GMA)
- Student Canteen (1958–1965; ABS-CBN, 1975–1986; GMA, 1989–1990; RPN/New Vision 9)
- Studio 7 (2018–2019; GMA)
- Sunday All Stars (2013–2015; GMA)
- Sunday Funday (2012; TV5)
- Sunday Noontime Live! (2020–2021; TV5)
- Sunday PinaSaya (2015–2019; GMA)
- Sunday Special, Iba 'to! (1986–1988; IBC)
- Superstar (1970–1989; KBS/RPN/IBC)
- Superstar: Beyond Time (1994–1995; New Vision 9/RPN)
- Tahanang Pinakamasaya (2024; GMA)
- Tara Lets! (2016–2017; CLTV)
- That's Entertainment (1986–1996; GMA)
- The Bob Stewart Show (1961–1986; RBS/GMA)
- The Imelda Papin Show (2003–2004, RPN)
- The Mega and the Songwriter (2013–2014; TV5)
- The Penthouse Live! (1982–1987; GMA)
- The Sharon Cuneta Show (1986–1988; IBC, 1988–1997; ABS-CBN)
- This is My Story, This is My Song (2012–2018; GMA News TV/Light TV)
- TiktoClock (2022–present; GMA, 2024; GTV)
- TSAS (The Sunday Afternoon Show) (2015; PTV)
- Uncle Bob and Friends (1977–1986; GMA)
- Vilma (1986–1995; GMA)
- Walang Tulugan with the Master Showman (1997–2016; GMA)
- Wil Time Bigtime (2011–2013; TV5)
  - Willing Willie (2010–2011; TV5)
- Wil To Win (2024–2025; TV5/One PH/BuKo Channel/Sari-Sari Channel, 2025; RPTV)
- Wilyonaryo (2026; WilTV)
- Wowowee (2005–2010; ABS-CBN)
- Wowowillie (2013; TV5)
- Wowowin (2015–2022; GMA, 2022–2023; All TV)
- Ysa Ysa A Drama Enrignnement (1998; GMA)
- Zambo Jambo (1997–2005; ABS-CBN Zamboanga)

== See also ==
- Television in the Philippines
- List of most-watched television broadcasts

Channels:

- List of programs broadcast by ABS-CBN
- List of programs broadcast by Studio 23
- List of programs broadcast by Knowledge Channel
- List of programs broadcast by ABS-CBN Sports and Action
- List of All TV original programming
- List of programs broadcast by Jeepney TV
- List of programs broadcast by Yey!
- List of programs previously broadcast by Yey!
- List of Kapamilya Channel original programming
- List of A2Z original programming
- List of programs broadcast by DZMM/DZMM TeleRadyo
- List of programs aired by DZMM/DZMM TeleRadyo
- List of GMA Network original programming
- List of GTV (Philippine TV network) original programming
- List of programs broadcast by Fox Filipino
- List of TV5 original programming
- List of programs broadcast by One Sports
- List of Net 25 original programming
- List of programs broadcast by Banahaw Broadcasting Corporation
- List of programs broadcast by Intercontinental Broadcasting Corporation
- List of programs broadcast by People's Television Network
- List of programs broadcast by Light TV
- List of programs broadcast by RJTV
- List of programs previously broadcast by RJTV
- DWDB-TV
- List of programs broadcast by UNTV
- List of programs broadcast by BEAM TV
- List of CNN Philippines original programming
- List of programs previously broadcast by Radio Philippines Network
- List of programs broadcast by SolarFlix
- List of programs previously broadcast by Southern Broadcasting Network
- List of programs broadcast by Jack TV
- List of programs broadcast by CLTV36
