= List of GTV (Philippine TV network) original programming =

An image of GTV's logo

GTV (formerly known as QTV, Q and GMA News TV) is a commercial broadcast television network in the Philippines owned by Citynet Network Marketing and Productions Inc., a subsidiary of GMA Network Inc. The following is a list of all original television programming by QTV, Q, GMA News TV and GTV.

== Current original programming ==
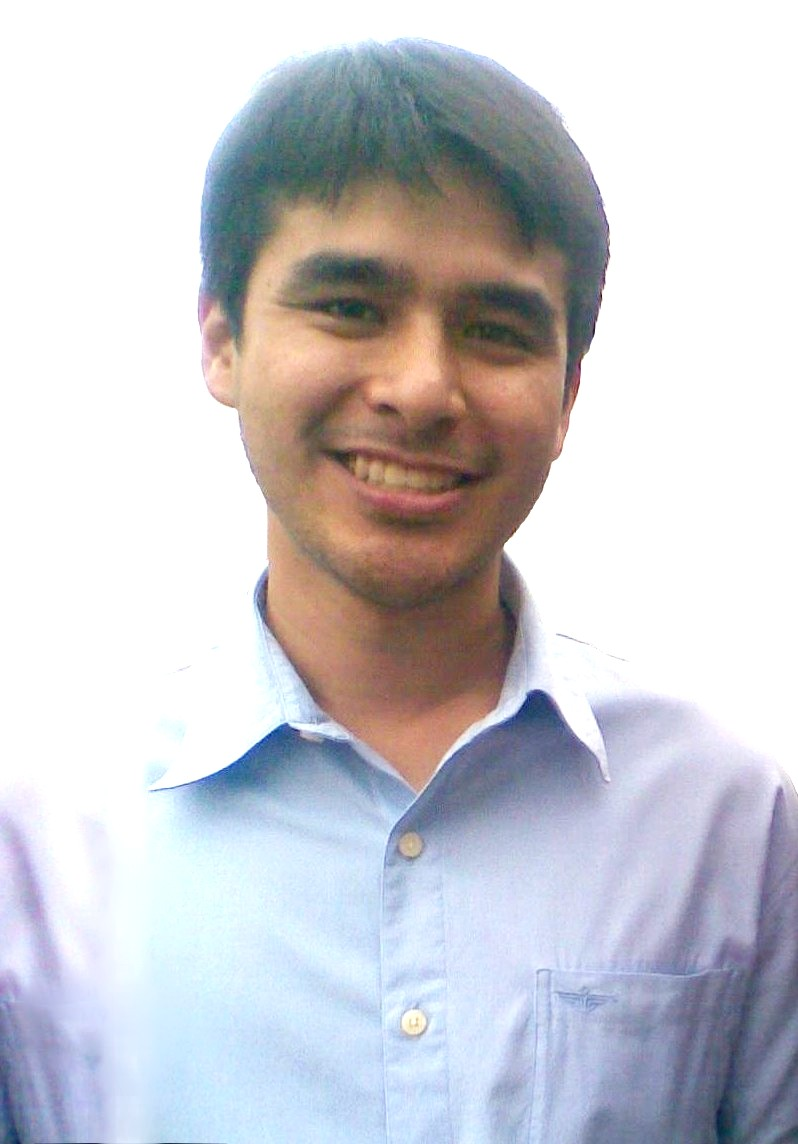
Atom Araullo, anchor of the news show, State of the Nation

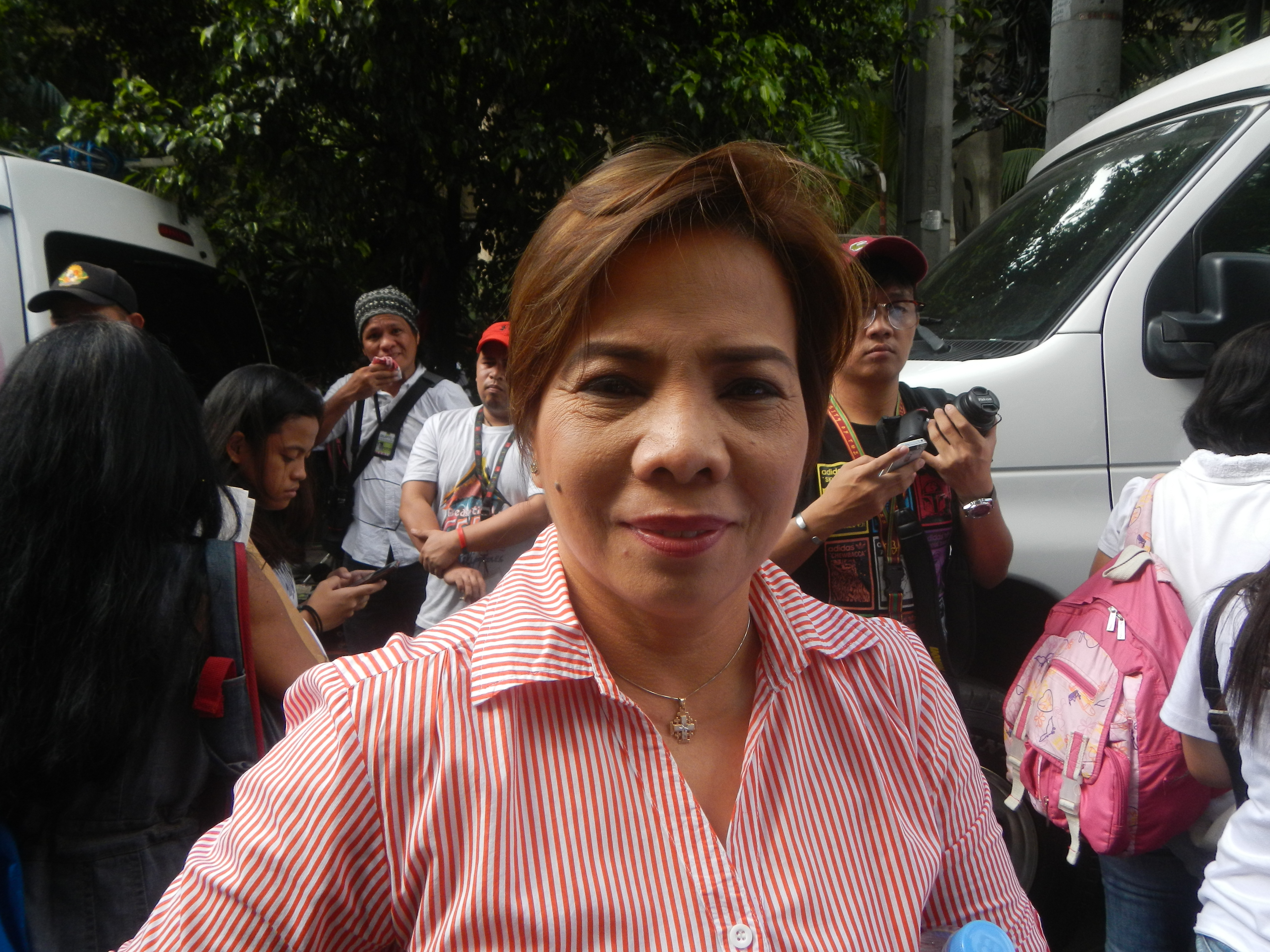
Susan Enriquez, host of the magazine show, iJuander

GTV is currently broadcasting fifteen original programming. Titles are listed in alphabetical order followed by the year it debuted in parentheses.

=== Talk ===
- Chika Kart (2026)
- Kalurks! (2026)

=== News ===
- Balitanghali (2021)
- Dobol B TV (2021)
- State of the Nation (2021)
- Usap-usapan: What We Know So Far (2026)

=== Documentary ===
- Celeste Unscripted (2026)

=== Travelogue ===
- Biyahe ni Drew (2024)

=== Magazine ===
- Good News with Vicky Morales (2021)
- iJuander (2021)

=== Infotainment ===
- Business Matters (2026)
- Healing Galing (2026)
- NegoSiyensya (2026)
- Pinas Sarap (2017)

==== Cooking ====
- Farm to Table (2021)

== Former original programming ==
Titles are listed in alphabetical order followed by the year of debut in parentheses. The following include former original programming by defunct television networks – QTV, Q and GMA News TV.

=== Drama ===
- Bayan Ko (2013)
- Dahil sa Iyong Paglisan (2006–08)
- Kapag nasa Katwiran, Ipaglaban Mo! (2012–13)
- The Lost Recipe (2021)
- My Guardian Abby (2005–06)
- My Fantastic Pag-ibig (2021)
- Noel (2006)
- Posh (2006)
- Project Destination (2020)
- Parang Kayo Pero Hindi (2023)
- Titser (2013)
- Wagas (2013–19)

=== Variety ===
- Flex (2021)
- I Laugh Sabado (2010–11)
- JAM (2015–18)
- Let's Get Aww!!! (2005–06)
- MINT: Music Interactive (2005)
- MMS: My Music Station (2005–07)
- This is My Story, This is My Song (2012–18)

=== Comedy ===
- Ay, Robot! (2005–07)
- Camera Café (2007–09)
- Family Zoo (2006)
- Ganda ng Lola Ko (2005–06)
- H3O: Ha Ha Ha Over (2005–07)
- Laugh to Laugh: Ang Kulit! (2005–06)
- O Mare Ko (2005–06)
- Project 11 (2005–06)
- TOLS (2022)

=== Talk ===
- Full Time Moms (2009–11)
- Gabe Me a Break (2006–07)
- The Gud Nite Show (2008)
- Love Hotline (2013–14)
- Mars (2012–19)
- Moms (2005–09)
- Negosyo Goals (2024)
- Newsmakers (2020)
- Personalan: Ang Unang Hakbang (2011–13)
- Power House (2011–14)
- The Ricky Lo Exclusives (2007–09)
- Showbiz Exclusives (2011–12)
- The Sobrang Gud Nite Show with Jojo A All the Way! (2007–08)
- Tonight with Arnold Clavio (2010–20)
- Tweetbiz: The Bizniz of Chizmiz (2009–11)
- Tweetbiz Insiders (2011)

=== Game ===
- Game of the Gens (2021)
- Iba Na ang Matalino: The Nutroplex Brain Challenge (2007)
- Now Na! (2006–07)
- Takeshi's Castle (2006, 2010)

=== Reality ===
- Day Off (2005–19)
- Fam Jam (2005–06)
- Follow the Star (2011–14)
- Here Comes the Bride (2007)
- Show Ko! (2005–06)
- The Smiths (2011)

==== Talent-based ====
- I-Shine Talent Camp (2011)
- Pop Star Kids (2005–07)
- Stars on Ice (2007)

=== News ===
- Balita Ko (2023)
- Balita Pilipinas Ngayon (2011–19)
- Balita Pilipinas Primetime (2011–14)
- Balitanghali Weekend (2010–20)
- Bigtime Balita (2020)
- Boses ng Balita (2020)
- Buena Manong Balita (2019–22)
- Citynet Evening News (1995–99)
- Citynet Late-Night News (1995–99)
- Citynet Morning News (1995–99)
- Citynet Noontime/Afternoon News (1995–99)
- Citynet Television News (1995–99)
- Citynet Weekend News (1995–99)
- Dobol A sa Dobol B (2017–20)
- Dobol B sa News TV (2011–12, 2017–21)
- Dobol B: Bantay Balita sa Kamara (2019–20)
- Dobol B: Bantay Balita sa Senado (2019–20)
- DZBB Executive Summary (2020–21)
- Flash Report sa Q (2007)
- Flash Report sa QTV (2005–07)
- GMA Regional TV Weekend News (2019–20)
- IM Ready sa Dobol B (2019–21)
- In the Limelight (2011)
- Kape at Balita (2012–13)
- Kay Susan Tayo sa Super Radyo DZBB (2019–20)
- Liwanag sa Balita (2019–20)
- Live on Q (2007–11)
- May Tamang Balita (2011–13)
- News Live (2021–23)
- News on Q (2005–11)
- News to Go (2011–19)
- News TV Live (2011–21)
- News TV Quick Response Team (2011–21)
- Regional TV News (2021–24)
- Regional TV Weekend News (2020–21)
- Review Philippines (2007–08)
- SOS: Serbisyo on the Spot (2020)
- Super Balita sa Hapon (2020)
- Super Balita sa Tanghali Nationwide (2020)
- Super Radyo Nationwide (2019–20)

=== Documentary ===
- Bongga Ka Star (2006)
- Brigada (2011–24)
- Chances Are (2009–10)
- DoQmentaries (2008–09)
- Front Row (2011–14, 2020)
- I-Witness (2020)
- Investigative Documentaries (2011–20)
- Misteryo (2010)
- Na-Scam Ka Na Ba? (2006)
- On Record (2021–22)
- One Proud Mama (2008–09)
- Proudly Filipina (2006–09)
- Pusong Wagi (2005–06)
- Reel Time (2011–20)
- Reporter's Notebook (2021–22)
- Stories of Hope (2021–22)
- True Stories (2010–11)
- Tunay na Buhay (2021–22)

==== Travelogue ====
- I Love Pinas (2011–15)
- Motorcycle Diaries (2011–17)
- Road Trip (2012–19)
- Tripinas (2015)
- Weekend Getaway (2011–13)

=== Magazine ===
- Dapat Alam Mo! (2021–24)
- Hamon ng Kalikasan (2012)
- Ang Pinaka (2005–20)
- Pop Talk (2011–21)

=== Public affairs ===
- Adyenda (2005–18)
- Bawal ang Pasaway kay Mareng Winnie (2011–20)
- Diyos at Bayan (2005–19)
- Draw the Line (2005–09, formerly Women's Desk)
- Shout Out: Sigaw ng Kabataan! (2016–18)
- Talking Points with Rose Solangon (2015–19)

=== Public service ===
- Alisto (2020)
- On Call: Serbisyong Totoo. Ngayon. (2011–12)
- Reunions (2005–11, formerly Sana'y Muling Magkapiling)

=== Infotainment ===
- At Your Service-Star Power (2005–07)
- The Awesome Life (2019)
- Balikbayan (2005–11)
- The Beat (2006–11, formerly Sapulso)
- Best Men (2011–13)
- Boarding Pass (2014)
- Bright Side (2020)
- Business Matters (2024)
- Candies (2005–06)
- Everyday Easy (2013–14)
- Fans Kita (2005–06)
- Fit & Fab (2008–10)
- Fil It Up with Mig Ayesa and Sophie Sumner (2015)
- Family Time (2020)
- Fashbook (2011–14)
- Fashionistas by Heart (2008–10)
- Filipknow (2012–15)
- Gandang Ricky Reyes (2005–10)
- Glow Up (2019–20)
- Happy Life (2016)
- Hashtag Pinoy (2015–19)
- Healthcetera with Dr. Manny and Dra. Pie Calayan (2015)
- The Healthy Life (2012–15)
- Hired! (2005–09, formerly May Trabaho Ka)
- Home Work (2020)
- IRL (2020–21)
- Just 4 Kids (2014)
- Kids HQ (2016–18)
- Kids on Q (2007–10)
- Konsyumer at Iba Pa! (2021)
- Life and Style With Ricky Reyes (2010–11)
- Liga ng Kababaihan (2005–06)
- Living It Up (2007–09)
- Lovelife (2005–07)
- Masigasig (2007)
- Miya (2005–07)
- Oh My Job! (2021–22)
- OrganiqueTV (2015–17)
- Pera Paraan (2020–21)
- Pisobilities (2012–18)
- Planet Q (2007–08)
- Power Review (2010–11)
- Q Tube (2009–10)
- Q-Lets and Co. (2010)
- Ripley's Believe It or Not! (2009)
- RX Men (2005–08)
- Siyensikat (2019–20)
- Sus Naman! (2010–11)
- The Sweet Life (2007–11)
- Taste Buddies (2012–22)
- Tropang Potchi (2009–11)
- Turbo Zone, Feed Your Drive! (2011-20)
- TWGRR: D'World of Gandang Ricky Reyes (2005–20)
- Ugaling Wagi (2013–15)
- Vintage Trip (2016–19)
- The Working Class (2018-20)
- World-Class Kababayan (2019)
- X-Life (2010–11)

==== Cooking ====
- Chef to Go (2007–09)
- Daddy-licious (2009)
- Del Monte Kitchenomics (2011)
- Delicioso (2010–11)
- Healthy Cravings (2010–11)
- Idol sa Kusina (2011–20)
- Ka-Toque: Lutong Barkada (2005–09)
- Lutong Bahay (2024–25)
- My Favorite Recipes (2009–10)
- Nancy Lumen: The Pinoy Foodie (2011–12)
- Quickfire (2008–12)
- Sarap at Home (2009–12)
- Sarap with Family (2013–17)
- Secrets of the Masters (2009)
- Tara! Lets Eat! (2009–11)
- Tiny Kitchen (2015–16)
- True Confections (2008–10)

=== Sports ===
- Game! (2011–12)
- NCAA (2021–26)
- News TV All Sports (2011–18)
- Philippine Secondary Schools Basketball Championship: Battle of Champions (2013)
- Shakey's V-League (2013–15)
- Sports Pilipinas (2012–14)
- TKO: Tanghali Knockouts: Matira Matibay (2013–14)
- Who's Next? Pro-Boxing Series (2016–17)

=== Others ===
- Armor of God (2010–12)
- Baywalk (2005)
- Be Alive (2012–13)
- Bluffing with Paolo and Bodie (2010)
- Dare Duo (2009)
- The Debutante (2008)
- Design Para sa Lahat (2012)
- Dishkarte of the Day (2016)
- The Dr. Tess Show (2014)
- Events Incorporated (2009–10)
- The Final Cut (2006)
- Ginang Fashionista (2005)
- Groupee TV (2005)
- Hapinas (2006–08)
- Hayop Atbp. (2010–11)
- Hollywood Boot Camp (2007)
- Home Base (2012–15)
- Last Woman Standing (2007–08)
- Life Rocks (2015)
- Luv U Pet with Jamie Fournier and Lestre Zapanta (2015)
- Mga Waging Kuwento ng OFW (2007–08)
- Michelle Simone's Entertains (2007)
- Mommy Diary (2009)
- Mommy Elvie at 18
- Music Bank (2020)
- MyHouse Today (2015)
- Nang Magising si Juan (2014)
- Philippine Explorer (2008–10)
- Puso Mo sa Amerika (2008)
- Remix Report (2011–12)
- Running Man (2020)
- RunnerSpeak (2009–10)
- Sarap to Heart (2012)
- Say Mo Doc (2014)
- SME GO! Powered by Go Negosyo (2012–13)
- Smile TV (2010–11)
- Weddings TV (2014–15)
- Word of Mouth (2009)
- You Women (2009)

=== Specials ===
- 1st Shakey's V League All Star Weekend (December 1, 2013)
- 20 Istorya: Dalawpung Taon ng GMA Public Affairs (2007)
- 20th Asian TV Awards (December 5, 2015)
- 300 Kilometers Ang Paglalakbay (May 29, 2011)
- 2010 MMFF Parade (December 24, 2010)
- 2019 Southeast Asian Games: Closing Ceremony (December 11, 2019)
- Ageless Passion: Justice Artemio Pangaiban’s 75th Birthday TV Special (January 22, 2012)
- Ako si Ninoy (August 24, 2013)
- Always Whitney (January 5, 2014)
- Anak ng Bayan: Katipunan Primer (October 25, 2013)
- Ang Kasagutan (produced by Billy Graham Evangelistic Association) (December 2006)
- Awit ng Pasko: A Musical Documentary (December 14, 2013)
- Bond Cocktail (March 30, 2014)
- Bond Girls Are Forever (March 30, 2014)
- Bongga Ka Star Grand Finals (August 27, 2006)
- Citynet Television: First Anniversary Special (August 31, 1996)
- Cory Aquino: The Housewife Who led a Revolution (February 2012)
- The Day Kennedy Died: John F. Kennedy Assassination Documentary Special (November 22, 2013)
- Divine Wedding Dresses with the Knot (June 29, 2009)
- Eats More Fun: Desserts (2012)
- Eats More Fun in the Philippines (2012)
- Eddie Romero's Dangal: Father's Day Drama Special (June 2010)
- Eleksyon: The GMA Election Coverage (2007, 2010, 2013, 2016, 2019, 2022)
- Experience GMA Today & Beyond: 58 Glorious Years of Television (November 2, 2008)
- Fam Jam Grand Finals (2006)
- Gabi ng Pagpupugay: 100 Taon ng Philippine Sports (August 10, 2014)
- Ground Zero (2011)
- Idols on Q: Featuring the American Idols and finalists (May 17 and 23, 2009)
- I-Shine Talent Camp TV Grand Finals (June 2012)
- Imbestigador: Bantay: Kaban ng Bayan (September 21, 2013)
- Imelda (October 5, 2014)
- Inno Sotto: A Special Fashion Documentary (April 5–6, 2008)
- Inside Malacañang: A National Geographic Channel Documentary (June 30, 2012)
- Inside the Titanic (November 10, 2013)
- It's Good to Be a President (2012)
- Just for Laughs Anniversary Special (January 6–7, 2010)
- Kalam: Usapin ng Seguridad sa Pagkain (2008)
- Laban ng Lahi: Donnie Nietes vs. Mario Rodriguez Fight (August 6, 2011)
- Laban ng Lahi: Johnreil Casimero vs. Raul Hirales Fight (July 25, 2010)
- Last Woman Standing Grand Finals (2008)
- Limang Dekada: The GMA News 50th Anniversary Special (January 31, 2010)
- Look Up, Look Up: 2013 GMA News and Public Affairs Yearend Review (January 4, 2014)
- Manila Invitational Cup 2010 Basketball Finals (June 26–29, 2010)
- Marcos: The Downfall of a Dictator (February 2012)
- Mga Kuwentong Pambata Ni Rizal (June 19, 2011)
- Miss Global Philippines 2014 (November 23, 2014)
- Miss Republic of the Philippines 2015 (November 23, 2015)
- Miss Tourism Philippines 2015 (August 9, 2015)
- Miss Universe Philippines 2025 (May 4, 2025)
- Motorcycle Diaries ASEAN Expedition Documentary Special (July 8, 2012)
- Mrs. Universe Beauty Pageant (November 29, 2009)
- Ms. QC Diamond Jubilee (October 12, 2014)
- Nelson Mandela: One Man (December 20, 2013)
- ONE Championship: Valor of Champions (August 2015)
- PDu30 @ 100 (October 10, 2016)
- PiliPinas Debates 2016 – Mindanao leg (February 21, 2016)
- Pinay Beauty Queen Academy Season 1 Grand Finals (December 27, 2014)
- Pinay Beauty Queen Academy Season 2 Grand Finals (September 19–20, 2015)
- Pluma: Rizal, Ang Dakilang Manunulat (June 19, 2011)
- Pop Star Kids Grand Finals Showdown (September 17, 2006 and July 29, 2007)
- Pride & Glory: The Sonsona-Hernandez Fight (November 22, 2009)
- Prince George of Cambridge: Born to Reign (December 21, 2013)
- The Pursuit of Style: A Young Designer's Special (April 25–26, 2009)
- Reina Hispanoamericana 2017 (November 5, 2017)
- Relationship Status: Single (August 28, 2011)
- RH Bill: The Grand Debate (2011)
- Ron Mariano: Salamangkero (October 10, 2010)
- Sa Ngalan Ng Anak: A CBN Holy Week Special (March 2007)
- San Pedro Calungsod: A GMA News TV Docu Drama Special (October 21, 2012)
- The Score (produced by Billy Graham Evangelistic Association) (December 2006)
- Signos: Ang Banta ng Bagong Klima (2008)
- Sisid (2008)
- SM Little Stars (October 2009)
- Stealing Minds (July 5, 2007)
- Summer Sarap (2009)
- Sutasi: The Search Begins (July and August 2009)
- Tanikala: CBN Asia Holy Week Special (March 2009)
- #TB2014: Throwback 2014 (The GMA News and Public Affairs Year-end Special) (December 28, 2014)
- Team Pacquiao (2009)
- Team Pilipinas In Australia Sports Special (May 15 and 22, 2010)
- Team Pilipinas In Jones Cup Sports Special (August 1, 2010)
- Thou Shalt Not Blink (2008)
- Thriller in Manila: The Documentary (September 30, 2012)
- Thriller in Manila: The Historic Bout (October 6, 2012)
- Travel: More fun in the Philippines (March 31, 2012)
- URCC 25: Domination (August 16, 2015)
- Votebook (2010)
- Walang Pera? (2009)
- Wildlife for Sale (2010)
- Women's World Awards (2006)

=== Informercials ===
- EZ Shop (2016–20)
- Shop Japan (2016)
- Shop TV (2015–19)

=== Religious ===
- The 700 Club Asia (2006–19)
- Eucharistia: Pananalangin at Pag-aaral (2019)
- Jesus the Healer (2005–19)
- Life Giver (2012–19)
- Light Up (2011–19)
- River of Worship (2016–19)
- Midnight Prayer Helps (2006–19)
- PJM Forum (2005–19)
- Worship Word & Wonders (2018–19)
