= 2006 in Philippine television =

The following is a list of events affecting Philippine television in 2006. Events listed include television show debuts, finales, cancellations, and channel launches, closures and rebrandings, as well as information about controversies and carriage disputes.

== Events ==
=== February ===
- February 4 - A stampede occurred during the first anniversary of ABS-CBN's television program Wowowee at the PhilSports Complex, causing the deaths of 74 people and the wounding of about 400 others.

=== March ===
- March 2 - John Paul Naco won the jackpot prize of one million pesos on Eat Bulaga!'s Laban o Bawi.
- March 5 - Alfred Labatos and EJ Jallorina left Goin' Bulilit

=== April ===
- April 1 - Keanna Reeves is voted winner of the first season of Pinoy Big Brother: Celebrity Edition.

=== May ===
- May 6 - Gerald Santos wins Pinoy Pop Superstar on its Grand Showdown held at the Araneta Coliseum.

=== June ===
- June 3 - 16-year-old Kim Chiu is voted winner of the first season of Pinoy Big Brother: Teen Edition.

=== July ===
- July 3 - ABS-CBN's newest late night newscast Bandila replacing ABS-CBN Insider anchored by Korina Sanchez, Henry Omaga-Diaz and Ces Drilon.

=== August ===
- August 7 - Edna Amarille wins the 1 million pesos of Kapamilya, Deal or No Deal.

=== September ===
- September 25 - Elsa Payumo wins the 1.127 million pesos of Kapamilya, Deal or No Deal.

=== October ===
- October 1 - Sports Plus ceased broadcasting and replaced by the Basketball TV channel formed by Solar, while moving most of Sports Plus programs to Solar Sports.
- October 12 - Studio 23 (now S+A) celebrated its 10th anniversary.
- October 20 - Samantha Olorga won the jackpot prize of one million pesos on Eat Bulaga!'s Laban o Bawi.
- October 23 - ABS-CBN TV-46 Pampanga launches TV Patrol Pampanga as an originating station broadcast around Pampanga, Bataan and Bulacan, which has been owned by the Regional Network Group.

=== November ===
- November 26 - Miss Earth 2006 beauty pageant was hosted by the Philippines at the National Museum Grounds at Manila. Miss Chile won the pageant.

=== December ===
- December 10 - Mau Marcelo wins the first season of Philippine Idol.(INQ7.net)
- December 16 - Yeng Constantino emerged as the Grand Star Dreamer of the first season of Pinoy Dream Academy. ABS-CBN launched their Lupang Hinirang MTV which also aired on Studio 23 until June 12, 2011.
- December 29 - Terry Lim Cua wins the 2 million pesos of Kapamilya, Deal or No Deal.

=== Unknown (dates) ===
- G Sat was launched as a direct-to-home satellite provider by First United Broadcasting Corporation (now Global Satellite Technology Services).

== Premieres ==
Date	Show
January 9	Gulong ng Palad on ABS-CBN 2
January 9	Now and Forever: Tinig on GMA 7
January 9	Sad Love Song on GMA 7
January 9	Forbidden Love on ABS-CBN 2
January 9	Morning! Umaga Na! on SBN 21
January 9	Afternoon Talk on SBN 21
January 9	Philippine Network News on SBN 21
January 14	Barangay Uniting for Chess on SBN 21
January 14	Usapang Legal with Willie on SBN 21
January 15	Celebrity Night of Dance and Music on SBN 21
January 16	Sikat Ka! Iloilo on ABS-CBN TV-10 Iloilo
January 16	Daisy Siete: Sayaw ng Puso on GMA 7
January 18	American Idol season 5 on ABC 5
January 23	Outstanding Twins on ABS-CBN 2
January 23	Le Robe De Marriage on GMA 7
January 23	TV Patrol Pampanga on ABS-CBN TV-46 Pampanga
January 30	Honey Honey on QTV 11
January 30	Transformers: Armada on QTV 11
February 3	Survivor: Panama on Studio 23
February 4	Komiks on ABS-CBN 2
February 5	Pinoy Big Brother: Celebrity Edition 1 on ABS-CBN 2
February 5	Trip na Trip on ABS-CBN 2
February 6	Spring Day on ABS-CBN 2
February 6	Mars on QTV 11
February 8	Now Na! on QTV 11
February 12	Bongga Ka Star on QTV 11
February 12	Your Song on ABS-CBN 2
February 12	The Healing Eucharist on ABS-CBN 2
February 13	My Name is Kim Sam Soon on GMA 7
February 13	Princess Lulu on ABS-CBN 2
February 20	Encantadia: Pag-ibig Hanggang Wakas on GMA 7
February 20	Agawin Mo Man ang Lahat on GMA 7
February 20	Hongkong Flight 143 on GMA 7
February 27	Sa Piling Mo on ABS-CBN 2
February 27	Zentrix on QTV 11
March 4	XXX: Exklusibong, Explosibong, Exposé on ABS-CBN 2
March 4	Wedding on ABS-CBN 2
March 5	Exposed on Studio 23
March 6	Snow White, Sweet Love on GMA 7
March 7	Arrested Development season 2 on Jack TV
March 8	My Name Is Earl on Jack TV
March 8	Mad TV season 8 on Jack TV
March 9	Everybody Hates Chris on Jack TV
March 10	Gudtaym on ABS-CBN 2
March 10	Justice League Unlimited on Studio 23
March 10	It's Always Sunny in Philadelphia season 1 on Jack TV
March 12	JackYard Starting on Jack TV
March 14	Just for Laughs Gags (season 3) on Jack TV
March 18	Jake 2.0 on Studio 23
March 18	Angel's Friends on QTV 11
March 19	Jologs Guide on GMA 7
March 19	Us Girls on Studio 23
March 20	Majika on GMA 7
March 20	Alice's Adventures in Wonderland on QTV 11
March 25	Tribe on Net 25
April 3	Daisy Siete: Nasaan Ka? on GMA 7
April 16	Urban Zone on ABS-CBN 2
April 17	Now and Forever: Duyan on GMA 7
April 17	Teledyaryo Sports on NBN 4
April 17	RPN NewsWatch Aksyon Balita on RPN 9
April 17	Wonderful Life on ABS-CBN 2
April 23	Pinoy Big Brother: Teen Edition 1 on ABS-CBN 2
April 24	House Husband on GMA 7
April 24	Noel on QTV 11
April 24	Kaka at Claire, Kaagapay Niyo on UNTV 37
May 1	Project 11 on QTV 11
May 1	Gokusen on GMA 7
May 1	Love of the Condor Heroes on GMA 7
May 1	Endless Love: Autumn in My Heart on GMA 7
May 1	Blue's Clues on ABC 5
May 1	Dora the Explorer on ABC 5
May 2	Family Zoo on QTV 11
May 6	Fantastikids on GMA 7
May 8	Hapinas on QTV 11
May 8	Eternal Love on ABS-CBN 2
May 13	Charlotte on QTV 11
May 15	Bituing Walang Ningning on ABS-CBN 2
May 15	I Luv NY on GMA 7
May 20	Isumbong Mo! (Tulfo Brothers) on RPN 9
May 27	Kami Naman on UNTV 37
May 28	Ano Ba'ng Hanap Mo on IBC 13
May 29	Calla Lily on ABS-CBN 2
May 29	Captain Barbell on GMA 7
May 29	My Girl on ABS-CBN 2
June 3	Let's Go! on ABS-CBN 2
June 5	Kapamilya, Deal or No Deal (season 1) on ABS-CBN 2
June 10	Last Exile on QTV 11
June 11	U Can Dance on ABS-CBN 2
June 19	Magandang Umaga Socsksargen on ABS-CBN TV-3 General Santos and ABS-CBN TV-5 Cotabato
June 19	A Love to Kill on ABS-CBN 2
June 20	Na-Scam Ka Na Ba? on QTV 11
June 24	Posh on QTV 11
June 25	Pinoy Meets World on GMA 7
June 26	A Second Proposal on GMA 7
June 26	Good Luck! on GMA 7
July 1	Pinoy Pop Superstar (season 3) on GMA 7
July 3	First Look on ANC
July 3	Mornings @ ANC on ANC
July 3	Daisy Siete: Landas on GMA 7
July 3	Prime News on ANC
July 3	Bandila on ABS-CBN 2
July 5	100% Pinoy! on GMA 7
July 6	Peach Girl on QTV 11
July 7	Galaxy Angel Z on QTV 11
July 8	Nagmamahal, Kapamilya on ABS-CBN 2
July 8	Aalog-Alog on ABS-CBN 2
July 8	Prime News Weekend on ANC
July 9	Love Spell on ABS-CBN 2
July 10	Ang Pagbabago on GMA 7
July 10	Mirada de mujer on ABS-CBN 2
July 14	Galaxy Angel A on QTV 11
July 17	Jewel in the Palace by Popular Demand on GMA 7
July 24	Now and Forever: Linlang on GMA 7
July 24	The Beat on QTV 11
July 29	John en Shirley on ABS-CBN 2
July 29	Saturday Night Blockbusters on ABC 5
July 29	Star Magic Presents on ABS-CBN 2
July 29	Teka Mona! on ABC 5
July 30	Philippine Idol on ABC 5
July 31	The Slayers on GMA 7
July 31	Yellow Handkerchief on GMA 7
August 7	O-Ha! on ABC 5
August 7	Games Uplate Live on ABS-CBN 2
August 12	It Started with a Kiss on ABS-CBN 2
August 14	Pinakamamahal on GMA 7
August 14	Love Story in Harvard on GMA 7
August 21	Swak na Swak on ABS-CBN 2
August 27	Pinoy Dream Academy on ABS-CBN 2
August 27	Sunday's Best on ABS-CBN 2
August 28	Super Inggo on ABS-CBN 2
August 28	Noypi, Ikaw Ba ‘To? on ABS-CBN 2
September 3	Super Doll Licca-chan on Hero
September 4	Miss Kim's Million Dollar Quest on GMA 7
September 4	Knights of Ramune on Hero
September 4	Offside on Hero
September 4	Ah! My Goddess on QTV 11
September 9	Komiks Presents: Da Adventures of Pedro Penduko on ABS-CBN 2
September 11	Crazy for You on ABS-CBN 2
September 11	Bakekang on GMA 7
September 11	Venta 5 on ABC 5
September 11	Battle B-Daman on QTV 11
September 11	BB-Daman Bakugaiden on QTV 11
September 15	Survivor: Cook Islands on Studio 23
September 19	Extreme Makeover on QTV 11
September 25	Now and Forever: Dangal on GMA 7
October 2	Atlantika on GMA 7
October 2	Takeshi's Castle on QTV 11
October 5	PMax on RPN 9
October 9	Maging Sino Ka Man on ABS-CBN 2
October 9	Kaagapay on UNTV 37
October 15	Hoooo U? on GMA 7
October 16	TV Patrol North Central Luzon on ABS-CBN TV-32 Dagupan
October 16	A Rosy Life on GMA 7
October 23	Into The Sun on GMA 7
October 23	Daisy Siete: Moshi Moshi Chikiyaki on GMA 7
October 29	Kapuso Movie Festival (Sunday edition) on GMA 7
October 30	Inocente de ti on ABS-CBN 2
November 6	Makita Ka Lang Muli on GMA 7
November 8	Palaban on GMA 7
November 12	Dahil sa Iyong Paglisan on QTV 11
November 20	Hardball on ANC
November 27	Kapuso Movie Festival (weekday edition) on GMA 7
November 27	Hikaru no Go on QTV 11
December 4	StarStruck: The Next Level on GMA 7
December 18	Princess Hours on ABS-CBN 2
December 23	Takeshi's Castle on GMA 7
December 30	Sabado Movie Greats on ABS-CBN 2

=== Unknown dates ===
- April: For M on RPN 9
- May:
  - CatDog on ABC 5
  - ChalkZone on ABC 5
  - Hey Arnold! on ABC 5
  - Global Guts on ABC 5
  - The Wild Thornberrys on ABC 5
  - SpongeBob SquarePants on ABC 5
  - Danny Phantom on ABC 5
- September:
  - Milyonaryong Mini on ABS-CBN 2
  - Nanny 911 on ETC 2nd Avenue
  - Hello Kitty's Paradise on GMA 7
  - Final Fantasy: Unlimited on GMA 7
- October:
  - iPBA on ABC 5
  - NBA Action on Basketball TV
  - NBA Inside Stuff on Basketball TV
  - NBA Jam on Basketball TV
  - Hardwood Classics on Basketball TV
  - Vintage NBA on Basketball TV
  - Home Shopping Network on Basketball TV

=== Unknown ===
- Kids TV on ABC 5
- America Atbp. on ABC 5
- Metro on ABC 5
- Generation RX on ABC 5
- Star sa Kusina on ABC 5
- PBA Classics on ABC 5
- Frontlines on ABC 5
- Global Shockers on ABC 5
- Hayop Na Hayop on ABC 5
- Premyo sa Resibo on ABC 5
- Ripley's Believe It Or Not: Philippine Edition on ABC 5
- Ultimate Guinness World Records Pinoy Edition on ABC 5
- Soul Mix on ABC 5
- Doble Cara on ABC 5
- How Clean Is Your House? on ABC 5
- Letty La Mas Fea on ABC 5
- Maximum Exposure on ABC 5
- Worst-Case Scenarios on ABC 5
- Direct Line on RPN 9
- Go Negosyo on RPN 9
- Kalusugan TV on RPN 9
- Make-Over on RPN 9
- Just for Laughs Gags on RPN 9
- Ang Say ng Kabataan (A.S.K.) on NBN 4
- Premyo sa Resibo on NBN 4
- Smashing Action! on NBN 4
- TranspoDOTCom on NBN 4
- Youth Voice on NBN 4
- Gimme a Break! on RJTV 29
- Pinoy Box Office on RJTV 29
- Spin-2-Win on RJTV 29
- America's Next Top Model on ETC
- Cold Case on ETC
- Inside Edition on ETC 2nd Avenue
- Real Pinoy Fighter on ABS-CBN 2
- Salam on ABS-CBN 2
- Yes To Christmas on ABS-CBN 2
- IBCinema Nights on IBC 13
- Primetime Sinemax on IBC 13
- Believer's Voice of Victory on IBC 13
- Power & Mercy on IBC 13
- Power to Unite with Elvira on IBC 13
- Chowtime: Conquest on IBC 13
- PJM Forum on GMA 7
- The 700 Club Asia on QTV 11
- Gabe Me a Break on QTV 11
- Midnight Prayer Helps on QTV 11
- The Final Cut on QTV 11
- Gag Ito! on Studio 23
- Kami Naman! on UNTV 37
- Ang Mga Nagsialis sa Samahang Ang Dating Daan on Net 25
- Gabay sa Kalusugan on Net 25
- Kapatid Sa Hanapbuhay on Net 25
- Just for Laughs Gags on Jack TV

== Returning or renamed programs ==
Show	Last aired	Retitled as/Season/Notes	Channel	Return date
Gulong ng Palad	1983 (RPN) / 1985 (BBC)	Same (2006)	ABS-CBN	January 9
Survivor	2005 (season 11: "Guatemala")	Same (season 12: "Panama")	Studio 23	February 3
Etheria: Ang Ikalimang Kaharian ng Encantadia	2006	Encantadia: Pag-ibig Hanggang Wakas	GMA	February 20
Sharon	2004	Same	ABS-CBN	February 26
Philippine Basketball Association	2006 (season 31: "Fiesta Conference")	Same (season 31: "Philippine Cup")	ABC	March 5
Philippine Basketball League	2006 (season 23: "Heroes Cup")	Same (season 23: "Unity Cup")	Studio 23	March 25
Shakey's V-League	2005 (IBC; season 2: "1st Conference")	Same (season 3: "1st Conference")	ABC	April 22
National Collegiate Athletic Association	2006	Same (season 82)	Studio 23	June 24
Pinoy Pop Superstar	2006	Same (season 3)	GMA	July 1
University Athletic Association of the Philippines	2006	Same (season 69)	Studio 23	July 8
Saturday Night Blockbusters	1998	Same	ABC	July 29
Survivor	2006 (season 12; "Panama")	Same (season 13: "Cook Islands")	Studio 23	September 15
Philippine Basketball Association	2006 (season 31: "Philippine Cup")	Same (season 32: "Philippine Cup")	ABC	September 28
National Basketball Association	2006 (RPN / Solar Sports)	Same (2006–07 season)	RPN / Basketball TV	November
Philippine Basketball League	2006 (season 23: "Unity Cup")	Same (season 24: "Silver Cup")	Studio 23	November 11
StarStruck	2006	Same (season 4)	GMA	December 4
Takeshi's Castle	1991 (Islands TV 13)	Same	GMA / QTV	Unknown

== Programs transferring networks ==
Date	Show	No. of seasons	Moved from	Moved to
January 9	Gulong ng Palad	—N/a	RPN / BBC (now ABS-CBN) (as the original 1977 series)	ABS-CBN (as a remake)
April 22	Shakey's V-League	3	IBC	ABC
December 23	Takeshi's Castle	—N/a	IBC / QTV	GMA
Unknown	Kids TV	—N/a	RPN	ABC
Unknown	The 700 Club Asia	—N/a	ABS-CBN / Studio 23 / ABC	QTV

== Finales ==
- January 2: TV Patrol Dumaguete (ABS-CBN TV-12 Dumaguete)
- January 6: Now and Forever: Agos (GMA 7)
- January 13: Daisy Siete: Ang Pitong Maria (GMA 7)
- January 20:
  - Amazing Twins (ABS-CBN 2)
  - The Frog Prince (GMA 7)
- January 22: Search for the Star in a Million (season 2) (ABS-CBN 2)
- January 28: My Juan and Only (ABS-CBN 2)
- February 1: Pusong Wagi (QTV 11)
- February 3: Only You (ABS-CBN 2)
- February 10:
  - Sugo (GMA 7)
  - Vietnam Rose (ABS-CBN 2)
  - Forbidden Love (ABS-CBN 2)
- February 12: Fam Jam (QTV 11)
- February 17:
  - First Love of a Royal Prince (GMA 7)
  - Etheria: Ang Ikalimang Kaharian ng Encantadia (GMA 7)
- February 24:
  - Palawan TV Patrol (ABS-CBN TV-7 Palawan)
  - Mga Anghel na Walang Langit (ABS-CBN 2)
- March 12:
  - StarStruck season 3 (GMA 7)
  - F! (Studio 23)
- March 31: Daisy Siete: Sayaw ng Puso (GMA 7)
- April 1: Pinoy Big Brother: Celebrity Edition 1 (ABS-CBN 2)
- April 8: Nginiig (ABS-CBN 2)
- April 9: Jologs Guide (GMA 7)
- April 11: Bora (ABS-CBN 2)
- April 12:
  - Now and Forever: Tinig (GMA 7)
  - Princess Lulu (ABS-CBN 2)
- April 14:
  - RPN Arangkada Balita (RPN 9)
  - Kaka in Action (UNTV 37)
- April 21:
  - Sad Love Song (GMA 7)
  - Mars (QTV 11)
  - Snow White, Sweet Love (GMA 7)
  - It's Always Sunny in Philadelphia season 1 (Jack TV)
- April 25: My Guardian Abby (QTV 11)
- April 28:
  - Le Robe De Mariage (GMA 7)
  - Spring Day (ABS-CBN 2)
  - Laugh to Laugh: Ang Kulit! (QTV 11)
  - Encantadia: Pag-ibig Hanggang Wakas (GMA 7)
  - My Name is Kim Sam Soon (GMA 7)
- April 29: Wag Kukurap (GMA 7)
- May 5: Outstanding Twins (ABS-CBN 2)
- May 6: Pinoy Pop Superstar (season 2) (GMA 7)
- May 12:
  - Gulong ng Palad (ABS-CBN 2)
  - Hongkong Flight 143 (GMA 7)
- May 13: Isumbong Mo Kay Tulfo (RPN 9)
- May 15: Survivor: Panama (Studio 23)
- May 19: Little Amy (ABS-CBN 2)
- May 25: American Idol season 5 (ABC 5)
- May 26:
  - Ang Panday (ABS-CBN 2)
  - Extra Challenge (GMA 7)
- May 27: Entertainment Konek (ABS-CBN 2)
- June 3: Pinoy Big Brother: Teen Edition 1 (ABS-CBN 2)
- June 13: My Guardian Abby (QTV 11)
- June 14: Pinoy Abroad (GMA 7)
- June 15: Wonderful Life (ABS-CBN 2)
- June 16: Jewel in the Palace (GMA 7)
- June 17: Candies (QTV 11)
- June 19: Liga ng Kababaihan (QTV 11)
- June 22: Cardcaptor Sakura (GMA 7)
- June 23:
  - Gokusen (GMA 7)
  - Mobile Kusina (GMA 7)
  - Show Ko! (QTV 11)
- June 25: ASAP Fanatic (ABS-CBN 2)
- June 29: O, Mare Ko (QTV 11)
- June 30:
  - ABS-CBN Insider (ABS-CBN 2)
  - Noel (QTV 11)
  - Daisy Siete: Nasaan Ka? (GMA 7)
- July 2: Shakey's V-League 2nd Season 2nd Conference (ABC 5)
- July 7: Endless Love: Autumn in My Heart (GMA 7)
- July 14: Good Luck! (GMA 7)
- July 21: Now and Forever: Duyan (GMA 7)
- July 22:
  - Quizon Avenue (ABS-CBN 2)
  - Wow Maling Mali (ABC 5)
- July 28: House Husband (GMA 7)
- August 5: Isumbong Mo! (Tulfo Brothers) (RPN 9)
- August 6: Wedding (ABS-CBN 2)
- August 11:
  - Agawin Mo Man ang Lahat (GMA 7)
  - Love of the Condor Heroes (GMA 7)
- August 20:
  - U Can Dance (ABS-CBN 2)
  - Sunday Family Cinema (ABS-CBN 2)
- August 21: OK Fine, 'To ang Gusto Nyo! (ABS-CBN 2)
- August 24: My Girl (ABS-CBN 2)
- August 25:
  - Sa Piling Mo (ABS-CBN 2)
  - Gudtaym (ABS-CBN 2)
- September 1: Ang Pagbabago (GMA 7)
- September 2: Komiks (ABS-CBN 2)
- September 8:
  - I Luv NY (GMA 7)
  - Calla Lily (ABS-CBN 2)
  - A Second Proposal (GMA 7)
- September 14: A Love to Kill (ABS-CBN 2)
- September 22:
  - Now and Forever: Linlang (GMA 7)
  - NCAA Season 82 basketball tournaments (Studio 23)
- September 29:
  - Majika (GMA 7)
  - Project 11 (QTV 11)
- October 2: UAAP Season 69 men's basketball tournament (Studio 23)
- October 6:
  - Bituing Walang Ningning (ABS-CBN 2)
  - Chowtime Na! Laban Na! (IBC 13)
- October 10: Na-Scam Ka Na Ba? (QTV 11)
- October 13:
  - TV Patrol Dagupan (ABS-CBN TV-32 Dagupan)
  - Love Story In Harvard (GMA 7)
- October 20:
  - Miss Kim's Million Dollar Quest (GMA 7)
  - Daisy Siete: Landas (GMA 7)
- October 22:
  - Love to Love (GMA 7)
  - SOP Gigsters (GMA 7)
- October 27: Pasión de Amor (ABS-CBN 2)
- November 2: Debate with Mare at Pare (GMA 7)
- November 3: Pinakamamahal (GMA 7)
- November 18: Star Magic Presents (ABS-CBN 2)
- November 24:
  - Now and Forever: Dangal (GMA 7)
  - Into the Sun (GMA 7)
- November 30: Crazy for You (ABS-CBN 2)
- December 3: Hoooo U? (GMA 7)
- December 9: Fantastikids (GMA 7)
- December 10: Philippine Idol (ABC 5)
- December 16: Pinoy Dream Academy season 1 (ABS-CBN 2)
- December 18: Survivor: Cook Islands (Studio 23)
- December 23: Posh (QTV 11)

=== Unknown dates ===
- October: NBA Jam (Solar Sports)

=== Unknown ===
- Yes, Yes Show! (ABS-CBN 2)
- Kontrobersyal (ABS-CBN 2)
- Pipol (ABS-CBN 2)
- PBB: What's The Word That's The Word (ABS-CBN 2)
- Close Up to Fame, The Search for the Next Close Up Couple (ABS-CBN 2)
- Payong Kapatid (ABS-CBN 2)
- Chowtime Na, Laban Na! (IBC 13)
- SMS: Sunday Mall Show (IBC 13)
- Txtube (GMA 7)
- Pops Talk Show (ABC 5)
- Look Who's Talking (ABC 5)
- Wala Yan Sa Lolo Ko! (ABC 5)
- How 'Bout My Place (ABC 5)
- Aawitan Kita (ABC 5)
- A.S.T.I.G. (All Set To Imitate God) (ABC 5)
- Blind Item (ABC 5)
- Mom TV (ABC 5)
- Mommy Academy (ABC 5)
- Viva Box Office (ABC 5)
- Wala Yan Sa Lolo Ko! (ABC 5)
- Doble Cara (ABC 5)
- Fear Factor (ABC 5)
- How Clean Is Your House? (ABC 5)
- Law & Order: Trial by Jury (ABC 5)
- Ninja Boy Ramtaro (ABC 5)
- The Apprentice with Martha Stewart (ABC 5)
- TNA Impact! (ABC 5)
- Kapatid (RPN 9)
- Gandang Ricky Reyes (RPN 9)
- Kids TV (RPN 9)
- Superbrands (RPN 9)
- What Would Jesus Do? (RPN 9)
- Kamao Reloaded (NBN 4)
- Smashing Action! (NBN 4)
- The Isla Hour (NBN 4)
- SBN Karaoke (SBN 21)
- Lil' Elvis and the Truckstoppers (Net 25)
- The Planet (Net 25)
- Ayon sa Bibliya (UNTV 37)
- Bible Guide (UNTV 37)
- Ex - Files (UNTV 37)
- Kaka at Claire, Kaagapay Niyo (UNTV 37)
- Kaka In Action (UNTV 37)
- New Generation (UNTV 37)
- Auto, Motor & Sport (Net 25)
- Dati'y Nasa Sumpa, Ngayon'y Nasa Tama (Net 25)
- Donny & Marie (Net 25)
- House Calls (Net 25)
- Ito ang Payo (Net 25)
- Philbert Frog (Net 25)
- The Country Mouse and the City Mouse Adventures (Net 25)
- Ginintuang Telon (QTV 11)
- Fans Kita (QTV 11)
- Let's Get Aww!!! (QTV 11)
- The Final Cut (QTV 11)
- Ah! My Goddess (QTV 11)
- Battle B-Daman (QTV 11)
- BB-Daman Bakugaiden (QTV 11)
- Charlotte (QTV 11)
- Galaxy Angel A (QTV 11)
- Galaxy Angel Z (QTV 11)
- Honey Honey (QTV 11)
- Last Exile (QTV 11)
- Peach Girl (QTV 11)
- Transformers: Armada (QTV 11)
- Zentrix (QTV 11)
- Eternal Love (ABS-CBN 2)
- Dos Amores (ABS-CBN 2)
- TV Patrol Iligan (ABS-CBN TV-4 Iligan)

== Networks ==
=== Launches ===
- January 8: Sonshine TV 39 Manila
- March 16:
  - HBO Hits
  - HBO Family
- October 1: Basketball TV
- November 26: UniversiTV
- Unknown: Golf Channel

=== Closures ===
- September 30: Sports Plus
- December 31: MTV Philippines

== Births ==
- January 19: JB Agustin, actor, socialite and philanthropist
- February 26: Dayara Shane, actress
- March 4: JM Canlas, actor and host of Team Yey! (d. 2023)
- April 10: Sofia Pablo, actress
- April 11: Jana Indanan, actress and dancer
- May 3: Mutya Orquia, actress
- May 14: Fyang Smith, social media influencer and model
- May 30: Liana Mae, actress
- June 23: CX Navarro, actor
- August 5: James David Graham, actor
- September 14: Hannah Lopez Vito, actress and host of Team Yey!
- October 6: Jarren Garcia, actor, model, singer and songwriter
- December 3: Krystal Brimner, singer and actress
- December 12: Kai Montinola, model and actress

== Deaths ==
- January 23: Ernie Baron, television journalist, host, and inventor (born 1940)
- April 23: Chat Silayan, actress and former beauty queen (born 1960)
- August 14: Analiza "Hazel" Recheta, Arnel Guiao and Ismael Cabugayan, television journalists
- September 18: Eddie Mercado, television host (born 1938)
- September 20: Jojo Lapus, newspaper journalist and television scriptwriter (born 1945)
- October 7: Dan Campilan, television journalist (born 1980)
- November 24: Maximo V. Soliven, newspaper journalist and publisher (born 1933)
- November 28: Rosita Quinto Stecza, 1950s actress under the screen name Rosa Mia (born 1924)
- December 22: Danilo Ayala Bernardo, journalist (born 1948)

== See also ==
- 2006 in television
