= 2005 in Philippine television =

The following is a list of events affecting Philippine television in 2005. Events listed include television show debuts, finales, cancellations, and channel launches, closures and rebrandings, as well as information about controversies and carriage disputes.

== Events ==
- April 25 - GMA Network's subsidiary Citynet Network Marketing and Productions and ZOE Broadcasting Network entered a blocktime deal to air some GMA-produced programs on Channel 11 (ZOE's owned TV frequency).
- July 21: GEM TV (now INC TV) was established on UHF Channel 49 (Digital).
- July 30: Asia's longest-running noontime variety show Eat Bulaga! celebrates 26th anniversary with a new opening billboard.
- September 26: Miss International 2005 is won by Lara Quigaman.
- November 11: QTV (now GTV) was launched by GMA Network, after the network entered an airtime agreement with ZOE Broadcasting Network to use DZOE-TV channel 11 for its said channel.
- December 10: The first season of Pinoy Big Brother is won by Nene Tamayo.
- December 15: ETC 2nd Avenue was launched by Solar Entertainment Corporation on cable TV.

=== Unknown dates ===
  - Elmer Domino won the jackpot prize of one million pesos on Eat Bulaga!'s Laban o Bawi.
  - Ronaldo Santos won the jackpot prize of one million pesos on Eat Bulaga!'s Laban o Bawi.

== Premieres ==
Date	Show
January 3	TV Patrol Cagayan Valley on ABS-CBN TV-2 Isabela
January 17	Stairway to Heaven on GMA 7
January 19	American Idol season 4 on ABC 5
January 31	'Til Death Do Us Part on ABS-CBN 2
January 31	Homeboy on ABS-CBN 2
January 31	M.R.S. (Most Requested Show) on ABS-CBN 2
January 31	Rubí on ABS-CBN 2
January 31	Save the Last Dance for Me on ABS-CBN 2
January 31	Saang Sulok ng Langit on GMA 7
January 31	Glass Shoes on GMA 7
February 5	Wowowee on ABS-CBN 2
February 5	Chowtime Na! on IBC 13
February 5	Entertainment Konek on ABS-CBN 2
February 6	Goin' Bulilit on ABS-CBN 2
February 15	Bora on ABS-CBN 2
February 18	Survivor: Palau on Studio 23
February 19	KSP: Kapamilya Sabado Party on ABS-CBN TV-4 Davao
February 19	StarDance on ABS-CBN 2
February 21	Full House on GMA 7
February 25	Mobile Kusina on GMA 7
March 5	Quizon Avenue on ABS-CBN 2
March 7	Maayong Buntag Kapamilya on ABS-CBN TV-3 Cebu
March 12	Transformers: Armada on GMA 7
March 13	Search for the Star in a Milion (season 1) on ABS-CBN 2
March 14	Now and Forever: Mukha on GMA 7
March 14	Kamao: Matirang Matibay on ABS-CBN 2
March 28	Teledyaryo Final Edition on NBN 4
April 4	Darna on GMA 7
April 6	Pinoy Abroad on GMA 7
April 6	Just Shoot Me! on Studio 23
April 11	Memories of Bali on ABS-CBN 2
April 11	Stained Glass on ABS-CBN 2
April 11	All About Eve on GMA 7
April 16	Showbiz Stripped on GMA 7
April 18	Daisy Siete: Tahanan on GMA 7
April 23	Wow Maling Mali on ABC 5
May 2	Encantadia on GMA 7
May 7	A.S.T.I.G. (All Set To Imitate God) on ABC 5
May 8	Bubble Gang Jr. on GMA 7
May 9	Mga Anghel na Walang Langit on ABS-CBN 2
May 9	Sweet 18 on GMA 7
May 16	Ikaw ang Lahat sa Akin on ABS-CBN 2
May 23	Qpids on ABS-CBN 2
May 25	Dokyu on ABC 5
May 28	My Juan and Only on ABS-CBN 2
May 30	Pasión de Amor on ABS-CBN 2
June 6	Magandang Umaga, Pilipinas on ABS-CBN 2
June 6	Kampanerang Kuba on ABS-CBN 2
June 11	Club TV on ABC 5
June 13	Now and Forever: Ganti on GMA 7
June 13	Señorita Mei Mei on GMA 7
June 20	Oh Feel Young on ABS-CBN 2
June 20	The Morning Show on NBN 4
June 25	Teledyaryo Sabado on NBN 4
June 26	Teledyaryo Linggo on NBN 4
June 27	Attic Cat on GMA 7
July 2	Pinoy Pop Superstar (season 2) on GMA 7
July 3	Asenso Pinoy on ABC 5
July 4	Sugo on GMA 7
July 4	Pilipinas, Gising Ka Na Ba? on UNTV 37
July 4	Green Rose on ABS-CBN 2
July 11	Little Amy on ABS-CBN 2
July 17	Hollywood Dream on ABC 5
July 17	Ang Mahiwagang Baul on GMA 7
July 21	GEM TV News on GEM TV
July 23	Gabay sa Mabuting Asal on GEM TV
July 23	Pasugo: Ang Tinig ng Iglesia ni Cristo on GEM TV
July 25	Friends on GMA 7
July 27	Iglesia ni Cristo and the Bible on Net 25/GEM TV
August 1	All For Love on GMA 7
August 1	Kaka in Action on UNTV 37
August 1	Public Hearing on UNTV 37
August 6	Dagundong on NBN 4
August 6	Kapitbahay at Kapitbisig on UNTV 37
August 6	Believer TV on UNTV 37
August 7	Usapang Kristyano on UNTV 37
August 7	Ex-Files on UNTV 37
August 7	Thanksgiving Day on UNTV 37
August 15	Kung Mamahalin Mo Lang Ako on GMA 7
August 15	Hotelier on GMA 7
August 17	Probe on ABS-CBN 2
August 20	Sabado Movie Greats on ABS-CBN 2
August 21	Pinoy Big Brother on ABS-CBN 2
August 29	Daisy Siete: Ang Pitong Maria on GMA 7
September 3	Hokus Pokus on GMA 7
September 4	Search for the Star in a Milion (season 2) on ABS-CBN 2
September 5	News Patrol on ABS-CBN 2
September 5	Diyos Ko, Mahal Mo Ba Sila? on NBN 4
September 10	Makuha Ka sa Tikim on ABS-CBN 2
September 12	Sassy Girl: Chun-Hyang on GMA 7
September 13	The Tyra Banks Show on ETC
September 16	Survivor: Guatemala on Studio 23
September 19	My 19 Year Old Sister-in-Law on GMA 7
September 19	Lilo & Stitch: The Series on ABS-CBN 2
September 19	Vietnam Rose on ABS-CBN 2
September 20	Myxilog on Myx
September 23	Myx Versions on Myx
September 24	Little Big Star on ABS-CBN 2
September 24	Myx News on Myx
September 24	Pinoy Myx Countdown on Myx
October 1	HP: To the Highest Level Na! on GMA 7
October 2	Kakabaka-boo on GMA 7
October 3	Amazing Twins on ABS-CBN 2
October 3	Romance on GMA 7
October 5	NBN Business on NBN 4
October 10	Frog Prince on GMA 7
October 24	Now and Forever: Agos on GMA 7
October 31	Totoo TV on ABC 5
November 3	S.O.S.: Stories of Survival on ABC 5
November 3	Wala 'Yan Sa Lolo Ko on ABC 5
November 5	Halad sa Kapamilya on ABS-CBN TV-3 Cebu
November 5	Blind Item on ABC 5
November 6	Shall We Dance? on ABC 5
November 7	Ang Panday on ABS-CBN 2
November 7	Jewel in the Palace on GMA 7
November 9	Chowtime Na! Laban Na! on IBC 13
November 11	Flash Report sa QTV on QTV 11
November 11	Pirlimpimpim on QTV 11
November 11	Heidi on QTV 11
November 11	Jackie & Jill on QTV 11
November 11	Love Hina on QTV 11
November 11	QTV Gems on QTV 11
November 11	Balitanghali on QTV 11
November 11	Toast on QTV 11
November 11	Wish Upon a Star on QTV 11
November 11	Heaven’s Coins on QTV 11
November 11	Endless Christmas on QTV 11
November 11	Mariana on QTV 11
November 11	MMS: My Music Station on QTV 11
November 11	Moms on QTV 11
November 11	Cabecita on QTV 11
November 11	Golden Bowl on QTV 11
November 11	Star on QTV 11
November 11	Laugh to Laugh: Ang Kulit! on QTV 11
November 11	Ganda ng Lola Ko on QTV 11
November 11	All In on QTV 11
November 11	News on Q on QTV 11
November 11	Love Life on QTV 11
November 11	Groupee TV on QTV 11
November 11	Adyenda on QTV 11
November 12	Let's Get Aww! on QTV 11
November 12	Ka-Toque: Lutong Barkada on QTV 11
November 12	Show Ko! on QTV 11
November 12	Ginintuang Telon on QTV 11
November 12	3R (Respect, Relax, Respond) on QTV 11
November 12	Candies on QTV 11
November 12	Fam Jam on QTV 11
November 12	Fans Kita on QTV 11
November 12	Day Off on QTV 11
November 12	Ay, Robot! on QTV 11
November 12	Sabado Showdown on QTV 11
November 12	MINT: Music Interactive on QTV 11
November 12	Diyos at Bayan on QTV 11
November 13	Gandang Ricky Reyes on QTV 11
November 13	RX Men on QTV 11
November 13	At Your Service-Star Power on QTV 11
November 13	Ginang Fashionista on QTV 11
November 13	Baywalk on QTV 11
November 13	Joan of Arcadia on QTV 11
November 13	Ang Pinaka on QTV 11
November 13	Pop Star Kids on QTV 11
November 13	May Trabaho Ka! on QTV 11
November 13	Sunday Super Sine on QTV 11
November 13	Jesus the Healer on QTV 11
November 14	Date With Tiffany on GMA 7
November 14	Liga ng Kababaihan on QTV 11
November 14	Mapalad Ang Bumabasa on UNTV 37
November 15	My Guardian Abby on QTV 11
November 15	Reunions on QTV 11
November 16	Pusong Wagi on QTV 11
November 16	BalikBayan on QTV 11
November 17	O, Mare Ko on QTV 11
November 17	Draw the Line on QTV 11
November 19	Adyenda on GMA 7
November 20	Jesus the Healer on GMA 7
November 20	Diyos at Bayan on GMA 7
November 23	S.O.C.O.: Scene of the Crime Operatives on ABS-CBN 2
November 28	TV Patrol Bicol on ABS-CBN TV-11 Naga
November 28	StarStruck season 3 on GMA 7
December 5	18 vs. 29 on GMA 7
December 5	H3O: Ha Ha Ha Over on QTV 11
December 12	Etheria: Ang Ikalimang Kaharian ng Encantadia on GMA 7
December 12	Only You on ABS-CBN 2
December 15	The Ellen DeGeneres Show on ETC 2nd Avenue
December 19	Dos Amores on ABS-CBN 2
December 26	First Love of a Royal Prince on GMA 7

=== Unknown dates ===
- January:
  - On-Air Tambayan on IBC 13
  - SINGLE on IBC 13
- July:
  - Ang Iglesia ni Cristo on GEM TV
  - Iglesia Ni Cristo Chronicles on GEM TV

=== Unknown ===
- PBB: What's The Word That's The Word on ABS-CBN 2
- Close Up to Fame, The Search for the Next Close Up Couple on ABS-CBN 2
- Payong Kapatid on ABS-CBN 2
- Perfect Moments on ABS-CBN 2
- Angelic Layer on ABS-CBN 2
- Barney & Friends on ABS-CBN 2
- Gate Keepers on ABS-CBN 2
- His and Her Circumstances on ABS-CBN 2
- Mr. Bean on ABS-CBN 2
- The Fairytaler on ABS-CBN 2
- Totally Spies on ABS-CBN 2
- A.R.K. (Anime Ring Kaisho) on ABC 5
- Ating Alamin on ABC 5
- Comedy Bites on ABC 5
- EZ Shop on ABC 5
- Mom TV on ABC 5
- Ali! on ABC 5
- ISLA on ABC on ABC 5
- Kapatid with Joel Mendez on ABC 5
- Proactiv Solution on ABC 5
- Today's Moms on ABC 5
- Law & Order: Trial by Jury on ABC 5
- Mr. Fighting Fight for Love on ABC 5
- Mumbai Thrillers on ABC 5
- Rock Star: INXS on ABC 5
- So You Think You Can Dance on ABC 5
- The Apprentice with Martha Stewart on ABC 5
- Ang Pagbubunyag on Net 25
- The Insider on ETC
- Project Runway on ETC
- Buhay Pinoy on SBN 21
- Mag-Negosyo Tayo! on RPN 9
- Superbrands on RPN 9
- Isumbong Mo! (Tulfo Brothers) on RPN 9
- Kapatid on RPN 9
- Makabayang Doktor on RPN 9
- Signs and Wonders on RPN 9
- What Would Jesus Do? on RPN 9
- Extreme Games 101 on RPN 9
- Gandang Ricky Reyes on RPN 9
- Golf Power Plus on RPN 9
- In DA Money on RPN 9
- Kapatid on RPN 9
- Kapihan ng Bayan on RPN 9
- Mag-Negosyo Tayo! on RPN 9
- Makabayang Duktor on RPN 9
- Man & Machine on RPN 9
- Superbrands on RPN 9
- Tipitipitim Tipitom on RPN 9
- W.O.W.: What's On Weekend on RPN 9
- Bantay OCW with Susan K.: Ang Boses ng OFW on NBN 4
- Batas Barangay on NBN 4
- Islamusik on NBN 4
- Kamao Reloaded on NBN 4
- Negosyo Atbp. on NBN 4
- Next Stop on NBN 4
- Serbisyo Muna on NBN 4
- Sportacular Asia on NBN 4
- Winner TV Shopping on NBN 4
- Tinig ng Bayan on NBN 4
- Buhay Pinoy on IBC 13
- Ideal Minds on IBC 13
- Krusada Kontra Krimen on NBN 4/RPN 9/IBC 13
- Pilipinas Sabong Sports on IBC 13
- SMS: Sunday Mall Show on IBC 13
- Tinig ng Kanyang Pagbabalik on IBC 13
- TV Patrol Southern Mindanao on ABS-CBN TV-4 Davao
- New Generation on UNTV 37
- Start Your Day The Christian Way on UNTV 37
- Startist on UNTV 37
- New Generation on RJTV 29
- Suzy's Cue with Suzy Guttler on RJTV 29

== Returning or renamed programs ==
Show	Last aired	Retitled as/Season/Notes	Channel	Return date
American Idol	2004	Same (season 4)	ABC	January 19
On-Air	2004 (ABC)	On-Air Tambayan	IBC	January
SINGLE	2004 (ABC)	Same	IBC	January
It's Chowtime	2005	Chowtime Na!	IBC	February 5
Survivor	2004 (season 9: "Vanuatu")	Same (season 10: "Palau")	Studio 23	February 18
Philippine Basketball Association	2005 (season 30: "Philippine Cup")	Same (season 30: "Fiesta Conference")	ABC	March 4
Philippine Basketball League	2005 (season 22: "Open Championships")	Same (season 22: "Unity Cup")	Studio 23	April 5
Wow Mali	2005	Wow Maling Mali	ABC	April 23
Shakey's V-League	2005 (season 1: "2nd Conference")	Same (season 2: "1st Conference")	IBC	May
National Collegiate Athletic Association	2005	Same (season 81)	Studio 23	June 25
Pinoy Pop Superstar	2005	Same (season 2)	GMA	July 2
University Athletic Association of the Philippines	2005	Same (season 68)	Studio 23	July 9
The Probe Team Documentaries	2005 (ABC)	Probe (2nd incarnation)	ABS-CBN	August 17
Search for the Star in a Million	2005	Same (season 2)	ABS-CBN	September 4
Survivor	2005 (season 10: "Palau")	Same (season 11: "Guatemala")	Studio 23	September 16
Philippine Basketball Association	2005 (season 30: "Fiesta Conference")	Same (season 31: "Fiesta Conference")	ABC	October 2
Philippine Basketball League	2005 (season 22: "Unity Cup")	Same (season 23: "Heroes Cup")	Studio 23	October 29
National Basketball Association	2005	Same (2005–06 season)	RPN / Solar Sports	November
At Your Service	2005 (GMA)	At Your Service-Star Power	QTV	November 13
StarStruck	2005	Same (season 3)	GMA	November 28
Encantadia	2005	Etheria: Ang Ikalimang Kaharian ng Encantadia	GMA	December 12

== Programs transferring networks ==
Date	Show	No. of seasons	Moved from	Moved to
January	On-Air Tambayan	—N/a	ABC	IBC
January	SINGLE	—N/a	ABC	IBC
August 17	Probe	—N/a	ABC	ABS-CBN
November 12	3R	—N/a	GMA	QTV
November 13	At Your Service	—N/a	GMA	QTV (as At Your Service-Star Power)
Unknown	Ating Alamin	—N/a	IBC	ABC
Unknown	The Basketball Show	—N/a	ABC	RPN

== Finales ==
- January 14: Forever in My Heart (GMA 7)
- January 21: Promise (ABS-CBN 2)
- January 28:
  - Lovers in Paris (ABS-CBN 2)
  - Morning Star (ABS-CBN 2)
  - Gata Salvaje (ABS-CBN 2)
  - Feel 100% (ABS-CBN 2)
  - Leya, ang Pinakamagandang Babae sa Ilalim ng Lupa (GMA 7)
  - White Book of Love (GMA 7)
- January 29:
  - EK Channel (ABS-CBN 2)
  - Star Circle Quest season 2 (ABS-CBN 2)
- January 30: Ang Tanging Ina (ABS-CBN 2)
- February 4:
  - MTB: Ang Saya Saya (ABS-CBN 2)
  - It's Chowtime (IBC 13)
- February 8: Bida si Mister, Bida si Misis (ABS-CBN 2)
- February 12:
  - SBD Jam (ABS-CBN TV-4 Davao)
  - Tsada (ABS-CBN TV-2 Cagayan de Oro)
  - Zambo Jambo (ABS-CBN TV-3 Zamboanga)
- February 20: StarStruck season 2 (GMA 7)
- February 26: Home Along da Airport (ABS-CBN 2)
- February 27: Wansapanataym (ABS-CBN 2)
- March 5: Pasugo: Ang Tinig ng Iglesia ni Cristo (GMA 7)
- March 11: Joyride (GMA 7)
- March 18: Mulawin (GMA 7)
- March 23: NBN Network News (NBN 4)
- March 30: Jessica Soho Reports (GMA 7)
- April 8:
  - Save the Last Dance for Me (ABS-CBN 2)
  - Stairway to Heaven (GMA 7)
- April 15:
  - Irene (GMA 7)
  - Daisy Siete: May Bukas Pa ang Kahapon (GMA 7)
- April 16:
  - The Probe Team Documentaries (ABC 5)
  - Wow Mali (ABC 5)
- April 22: Krystala (ABS-CBN 2)
- April 29: Full House (GMA 7)
- April 30: Sing Galing ni Pops (ABC 5)
- May 1: Naks! (GMA 7)
- May 6: Spirits (ABS-CBN 2)
- May 7: Pinoy Pop Superstar (season 1) (GMA 7)
- May 13: 'Til Death Do Us Part (ABS-CBN 2)
- May 15: Search for the Star in a Million (season 1) (ABS-CBN 2)
- May 16: Survivor: Palau (Studio 23)
- May 20:
  - Kamao: Matirang Matibay (ABS-CBN 2)
  - Hiram (ABS-CBN 2)
- May 21: StarDance (ABS-CBN 2)
- May 26: American Idol season 4 (ABC 5)
- June 3:
  - Magandang Umaga, Bayan (ABS-CBN 2)
  - Stained Glass (ABS-CBN 2)
- June 10:
  - Now and Forever: Mukha (GMA 7)
  - Glass Shoes (GMA 7)
  - Sweet 18 (GMA 7)
- June 12: SCQ Reload (ABS-CBN 2)
- June 17:
  - Memories of Bali (ABS-CBN 2)
  - All About Eve (GMA 7)
  - Teleaga (NBN 4)
- June 29: Dong Puno Live (ABS-CBN 2)
- July 1: Showbiz Number 1 (ABS-CBN 2)
- July 10: Bubble Gang Jr. (GMA 7)
- July 15: M.R.S. (Most Requested Show) (ABS-CBN 2)
- July 29: Señorita Mei (GMA 7)
- August 10: Special Assignment (ABS-CBN 2)
- August 12:
  - Saang Sulok ng Langit (GMA 7)
  - Oh Feel Young (ABS-CBN 2)
  - Friends (GMA 7)
- August 13: Star Cinema Presents (ABS-CBN 2)
- August 26:
  - Daisy Siete: Tahanan (GMA 7)
  - Diyos at Bayan (ZOE TV 11)
- August 27:
  - Idol Ko si Kap (GMA 7)
  - Jesus the Healer (ZOE TV 11)
- August 30: Adyenda (ZOE TV 11)
- August 31:
  - ZOE Balita Ngayon (ZOE TV 11)
  - ZOE News Round-up (ZOE TV 11)
  - The 700 Club Asia (ZOE TV 11)
  - Quigley's Village (ZOE TV 11)
- September 3: Fruits Basket (ABS-CBN 2)
- September 4: ABS-CBN News Advisory (ABS-CBN 2)
- September 9: Attic Cat (GMA 7)
- September 16:
  - Green Rose (ABS-CBN 2)
  - Myx Remakes (Myx)
  - Quantum Showcase (ABC 5)
- September 17:
  - Hoy Gising! Kapamilya (ABS-CBN 2)
  - OPM MYX Countdown (Myx)
- September 19: Morning Myx (Myx)
- September 25: Qpids (ABS-CBN 2)
- September 30: Hotelier (GMA 7)
- October 7: All For Love (GMA 7)
- October 21: Now and Forever: Ganti (GMA 7)
- November 4:
  - Ikaw ang Lahat sa Akin (ABS-CBN 2)
  - Sassy Girl: Chun-Hyang (GMA 7)
- November 5: Club TV (ABC 5)
- November 8: Chowtime Na! (IBC 13)
- November 9: Private I (ABS-CBN 2)
- November 11: Romance (GMA 7)
- November 12: Lakas Magsasaka (GMA 7)
- November 13:
  - Cushion Kids (GMA 7)
  - Blue's Clues (GMA 7)
- November 20: Hollywood Dream (ABC 5)
- November 25:
  - TV Patrol Naga (ABS-CBN TV-11 Naga)
  - TV Patrol Legaspi (ABS-CBN TV-4 Legazpi)
  - Darna (GMA 7)
- December 2: My 19 Year Old Sister-in-Law (GMA 7)
- December 3: Makuha Ka sa Tikim (ABS-CBN 2)
- December 9: Encantadia (GMA 7)
- December 10: Pinoy Big Brother: Season 1 (ABS-CBN 2)
- December 12: Survivor: Guatemala (Studio 23)
- December 16:
  - Kampanerang Kuba (ABS-CBN 2)
  - Rubí (ABS-CBN 2)
- December 23: Date With Tiffany (GMA 7)
- December 30: 18 vs. 29 (GMA 7)
- December 31: Magandang Gabi... Bayan (ABS-CBN 2)

=== Unknown dates ===
- July:
  - On-Air Tambayan (IBC 13)
  - SINGLE (IBC 13)
  - Shakey's V-League 2nd Season 1st Conference (ABC 5)
- October: The Misadventures of Maverick and Ariel (ABC 5)

=== Unknown ===
- The Quantum Channel (SBN 21)
- Sandara's Romance (ABS-CBN 2)
- VidJoking (ABS-CBN 2)
- Kaya Mo Ba 'To? (ABS-CBN 2)
- Perfect Moments (ABS-CBN 2)
- Kumikitang Kabuhayan (ABS-CBN 2)
- Art Jam (ABS-CBN 2)
- Seasons of Love (ABS-CBN 2)
- 100 Deeds for Eddie McDowd (ABS-CBN 2)
- 24 (ABS-CBN 2)
- Angelic Layer (ABS-CBN 2)
- Barney & Friends (ABS-CBN 2)
- Black Hole High (ABS-CBN 2)
- Gate Keepers (ABS-CBN 2)
- GetBackers (ABS-CBN 2)
- His and Her Circumstances (ABS-CBN 2)
- Masked Rider Ryuki (ABS-CBN 2)
- Mumble Bumble (ABS-CBN 2)
- Ragnarok the Animation (ABS-CBN 2)
- amTV (IBC 13)
- Ating Alamin (IBC 13)
- The Gospel of the Kingdom with Pastor Apollo C. Quiboloy (IBC 13)
- At Your Service (GMA 7)
- SMC's Dayriser (GMA 7)
- Shaider (GMA 7)
- New Life TV Shopping (ZOE TV 11)
- Psalty The Bible Show (ZOE TV 11)
- Superbook (ZOE TV 11)
- The Flying House (ZOE TV 11)
- Diyos at Bayan (RPN 9)
- Legal Forum (ZOE TV 11)
- PJM Forum (ZOE TV 11)
- Serbisyong Legal (ZOE TV 11)
- The Rock Of My Salvation (ZOE TV 11)
- This New Life (ZOE TV 11)
- Flying Rhino Junior High (ABC 5)
- Art Is Kool (ABC 5)
- Guidelines With Dr. Harold J. Sala (ABC 5)
- INQ TV (ABC 5)
- ISLA on ABC (ABC 5)
- Look Who's Talking (ABC 5)
- Mom Ko To! (ABC 5)
- POPS! (ABC 5)
- Secrets with Juliana Palermo (ABC 5)
- Three Blind Dates (ABC 5)
- Tutubi Patrol (ABC 5)
- Viva Cine Idols (ABC 5)
- Friends (ABC 5)
- Mr. Fighting Fight for Love (ABC 5)
- Mumbai Thrillers (ABC 5)
- Rock Star: INXS (ABC 5)
- So You Think You Can Dance (ABC 5)
- The Apprentice with Donald Trump (ABC 5)
- Between the Lions (Net 25)
- Play Music Videos (Net 25)
- Urban Peasant (Net 25)
- Con Todos Recados (Net 25)
- Captured (Net 25)
- Fresh Gear (Net 25)
- Oakie Doke (Net 25)
- The Screen Savers (Net 25)
- Tokshow With Mr. Shooli (RPN 9)
- Beauty School Plus (RPN 9)
- Direct Line (RPN 9)
- Diyos at Bayan (RPN 9)
- RPN Forum (RPN 9)
- Ratsada Balita (RPN 9)
- Prangkahan (RPN 9)
- Ugnayang Pambansa (RPN 9)
- Golf Power (RPN 9)
- Headlines Exposed (RPN 9)
- In DA Money (RPN 9)
- Jr. News (RPN 9)
- Life In The Word (RPN 9)
- Oh Yes, Johnny's Back! (RPN 9)
- Road Trip (RPN 9)
- Sports Review (RPN 9)
- Storyland (RPN 9)
- The Quantum Channel (RPN 9)
- Tipitipitim Tipitom (RPN 9)
- Cathedral of Praise with David Sumrall (RPN 9)
- Life In The Word (RPN 9)
- Pan sa Kinabuhi (RPN 9)
- 45 Minutos (NBN 4)
- Headlines Expose (NBN 4)
- Saklolo Abugado (NBN 4)
- Auto Focus (NBN 4)
- Batas Barangay (NBN 4)
- Dighay Bayan (NBN 4)
- Islamusik (NBN 4)
- Mommy Academy (NBN 4)
- Muay Thai (NBN 4)
- Problema N'yo, Sagot Ko! (NBN 4, ABC 5)
- She! (NBN 4)
- Sportacular Asia (NBN 4)
- The Sports List (NBN 4)
- DMZ TV (IBC 13)
- Global Family Series (IBC 13)
- Entrepinoy Start-Up (IBC 13)
- Good Take (IBC 13)
- Girls Marching On (ABS-CBN 2)
- TV Patrol Mindanao (ABS-CBN TV-4 Davao)
- Ads Unlimited (UNTV 37)
- Ano sa Palagay Mo? (UNTV 37)
- Barangay Showbiz (UNTV 37)
- Breakthrough (UNTV 37)
- FAQ's (UNTV 37)
- Ito Ang Balita (UNTV 37)
- Kids at Work (UNTV 37)
- Kulay Pinoy (UNTV 37)
- Mr. Fix It (UNTV 37)
- Pangarap ng Puso (UNTV 37)
- Startist (UNTV 37)
- Teleskuwela (UNTV 37)
- Weird Doctrines (UNTV 37)
- Workshop on TV (UNTV 37)
- Suzy's Cue with Suzy Guttler (RJTV 29)

== Networks ==
=== Launches ===
- January 1: HBO Signature
- March: GMA Pinoy TV
- July 12: Jack TV
- July 21: GEM TV (now INC TV)
- September 1: Boomerang Philippines
- October 1: Hero
- October 15: Crime/Suspense
- October 18: Brigada Mass Media Corporation
- November 1: Shop TV
- November 11: QTV (now GTV)
- December 12: Playhouse Disney (Asia)
- December 15: ETC 2nd Avenue

==== Unknown ====
- RPN USA

=== Closures ===
- September 1: ZOE TV (now A2Z and Light TV)

== Births ==
- February 16 - AJ Urquia, actor and host of Team Yey!
- February 23 - Jillian Ward, actress, model and singer
- March 19 - Dentrix Ponce, actor
- May 17 - Naya Ambi, singer
- June 2 - Bea Basa, actress
- June 12 - Ryzza Mae Dizon, actress
- September 7 - Mitch Naco, actress and host of Team Yey!
- October 7 - Kyle Ocampo, actress and model
- October 9 - Andrei Sison, actor (d. 2023)
- November 8 - Sofia Millares, actress and host of Team Yey!
- November 11 - Kryshee Grengia, actress
- December 15 - Sheena Belarmino, singer and actress

== Deaths ==
- January 7 - Orly Punzalan, Filipino radio-TV personality (born 1935)
- May 10 - Romy Diaz, Filipino actor (born 1941)
- May 28 - Richard Tann, Filipino Singer, Member of Circus Band, heart attack (born 1954)
- June 8 - Luis Santiago, TV director, gunshot (born 1977)
- October 2 - Juancho Gutierrez - Filipino Actor (born 1932)
- November 18 - Freddie Quizon, Filipino actor, comedian, production coordinator (born 1956)

== See also ==
- 2005 in television
