= Flight 143 =

Flight 143 may refer to one of the following aviation accidents:

- Air Canada Flight 143, also known as the "Gimli Glider", made an emergency landing after running out of fuel on 22 July 1983
- Philippine Airlines Flight 143, exploded prior to take-off on 11 May 1990

== See also ==
- Hongkong Flight 143, a 2006 Philippine television drama series
- X-15 Flight 143, an experimental flight on 17 July 1963
