= Knowledge Power =

- Genre: Education
- Presented by: Ernie Baron
- Country of origin: Philippines
- Original language: Filipino

Production
- Running time: 30 minutes
- Production company: ABS-CBN News and Current Affairs

Original release
- Network: ABS-CBN
- Release: July 5, 1998 – February 28, 2004

Knowledge Power is a Philippine television informative show broadcast by ABS-CBN. Hosted by Ernie Baron, it aired from July 5, 1998 to February 28, 2004, and was replaced by Nginiiig!. The program aired every Sunday from 5:30 p.m. to 6:00 p.m, the show is educational and informative even as it also entertains. The topics are highly informative, engaging and mostly out-of-the-ordinary. The program is a cross between Ripley's Believe It or Not! and Discovery Channel. It does not only explore into the bizarre and the extraordinary, but pursues light yet thought-provoking, significant and highly-instructive items. Features sometimes serve as survival tips for viewers. Through extensive research and creative production, the show delves on the sciences, health, history, paranormal, cultures, civilizations, people, among others.

The show aims to educate and entertain. The educational bent of the show is primarily geared towards enhancing children’s outlooks and potentials.

The show's title alludes to the widely quoted statement by Sir Francis Bacon, "Knowledge is power" (from Religious Meditations, Of Heresies 1597).

== Host ==
- Ernie Baron

== Format ==
The program is divided into four gaps—two main stories and two regular segments—which include "For Your Information" and "Health Tips ni Ka Ernie." Some new segments are "See Them Here First," "The First Knowledge," "Gallery," "Bakit Nga Ba?" "Question and Answer," "Scrabble, Scramble" and "What If."

== Accolades ==
The show won as Best Educational Program & Host in the 2004 & 2005 PMPC Star Awards for Television.

== See also ==
- Matanglawin
