= Matanglawin (TV program) =

2008–20 weekly science-environmental educational show

- Title card
- Genre: Informative, Educational
- Presented by: Kim Atienza
- Narrated by: Kim Atienza
- Opening theme: "Matanglawin" by Bayang Barrios
- Country of origin: Philippines
- Original language: Filipino
- No. of episodes: 652

Production
- Executive producer: Tonie Buensalido-Esperida
- Camera setup: Multiple-camera setup
- Production company: ABS-CBN News and Current Affairs

Original release
- Network: ABS-CBN
- Release: March 24, 2008 – May 3, 2020

Related
- Knowledge Power

Matanglawin (Baybayin: ᜋᜆᜅ᜔ᜎᜏᜒᜈ᜔, lit. 'hawkeye') is a Philippine television informative show broadcast by ABS-CBN. Hosted by Kim Atienza, it aired from March 24, 2008, to May 3, 2020, on the network's Sunday morning timeslot.

The show aired its final broadcast on May 3, 2020, due to the ABS-CBN shutdown because of the cease and desist order by the National Telecommunications Commission (NTC), following the expiration of the network's 25-year franchise granted in 1995, the denial of the franchise and the retrenchment of employees. Re-runs of the show aired on Knowledge Channel via Extracurricular subject, and on A2Z every weekends under Kidz Weekend morning block. The show eventually did not go back on-air as Atienza transferred to GMA Network on October 4, 2021.

== Overview ==
The show defines Kuya Kim takes on the vantage point of a Philippine hawk - Mapanuri, Mapagmatiyag, Mapangahas! (Inquisitive, Vigilant, Adventurous!) - as he takes on the role of an explorer in search of new, interesting trivia, legends to demystify.

== Final hosts ==
Main host

- Kim Atienza

Featured guest co-hosts

- Myrtle Sarrosa
- Jessy Mendiola
- Melai Cantiveros
- Teddy Corpuz
- Jugs Jugueta
- Jayson Gainza
- Jeffrey Tam
- Ryan Bang
- Robi Domingo
- Gretchen Ho
- Krissha Viaje
- Sammie Rimando

Batanglawin

- Nash Aguas
- Basty Alcances

Matanglawin cameos

- Eric "Eruption" Tai
- Drew Arellano
- Iya Villania
- Jolina Magdangal
- Marvin Agustin
- Gerald Anderson
- Rayver Cruz
- Nikki Gil
- Maja Salvador

== Awards and nominations ==
| Year | Association | Category | Nominee | Result |
|---|---|---|---|---|
| 2019 | PMPC Star Awards for Television | Best Educational Program Host | Kim Atienza | Won |
| 2019 | PMPC Star Awards for Television | Best Educational Program | Matanglawin | Won |
| 2018 | PMPC Star Awards for Television | Best Educational Program Host | Kim Atienza | Won |
| 2018 | PMPC Star Awards for Television | Best Educational Program | Matanglawin | Won |
| 2017 | PMPC Star Awards for Television | Best Educational Program Host | Kim Atienza | Won |
| 2017 | PMPC Star Awards for Television | Best Educational Program | Matanglawin | Won |
| 2016 | PMPC Star Awards for Television | Best Educational Program Host | Kim Atienza | Won |
| 2016 | PMPC Star Awards for Television | Best Educational Program | Matanglawin | Won |
| 2015 | PMPC Star Awards for Television | Best Educational Program Host | Kim Atienza | Won |
| 2015 | PMPC Star Awards for Television | Best Educational Program | Matanglawin | Won |
| 2014 | PMPC Star Awards for Television | Best Educational Program Host | Kim Atienza | Won |
| 2014 | PMPC Star Awards for Television | Best Educational Program | Matanglawin | Won |
| 2012 | 34th Catholic Mass Media Awards | Best Children's Program | Matanglawin | Special Citation |
| 2012 | PMPC Star Awards for Television | Best Educational Program Host | Kim Atienza | Won |
| 2012 | PMPC Star Awards for Television | Best Educational Program | Matanglawin | Won |
| 2012 | UPLB Gandingan Awards | Best Educational Program | Matanglawin | Won |
| 2012 | UPLB Gandingan Awards | Gandingan ng Kalikasa | Matanglawin | Won |
| 2012 | Gawad Tanglaw Awards | Best Educational Program | Matanglawin | Won |
| 2012 | NWSSU Student's Choice Awards | Best Educational Program | Matanglawin | Won |
| 2012 | BANFF Rockies Media Festival | Children's Programs (2+) Non-Fiction | Matanglawin | Nominated |
| 2012 | UPLB Gandingan Awards | Gandingan ng Edukasyon | Kim Atienza | Won |
| 2012 | DOST Media Awards | Special Citation for Television Program Host | Kim Atienza | Won |
| 2012 | UPLB Gandingan Awards | Best Educational Program | Matanglawin | Won |
| 2012 | NWSSU Student's Choice Awards | Best Educational Program Host | Kim Atienza | Won |
| 2012 | Gawad PASADO Awards | Gawad PASADO sa Kamalayang Panlipunan | Kim Atienza | Won |
| 2012 | Earth Day Network Inc. | Earth Day Ambassador for Biodiversity Conservation and Reforestation | Kim Atienza | Won |
| 2011 | PMPC Star Awards for Television | Best Educational Program | Matanglawin | Won |
| 2011 | UPLB Gandingan Awards | Best Youth-Oriented Program | Matanglawin | Won |
| 2011 | USTv Student's Choice Awards | Best Educational Program | Matanglawin | Won |
| 2011 | NWSSU Student's Choice Awards | Best Educational Program | Matanglawin | Won |
| 2011 | Gawad Tanglaw Awards | Best Educational Program | Matanglawin | Won |
| 2011 | 5th Hildegarde Awards | Citation for Development Communication | Matanglawin | Won |
| 2011 | Golden Screen TV Awards | Outstanding Natural History and Wildlife Program | Matanglawin | Won |
| 2011 | Anak TV Awards | Anak TV Seal for Child Sensitive Program | Matanglawin | Won |
| 2011 | Anak TV Awards | Top Ten Most Well Liked Shows | Matanglawin | Won |
| 2011 | NWSSU Student's Choice Awards | Best Educational Program Host | Kim Atienza | Won |
| 2011 | UPLB Gandingan Awards | Best Youth-Oriented Program Host | Kim Atienza | Won |
| 2011 | PMPC Star Awards for Television | Best Educational Program Host | Kim Atienza | Won |
| 2011 | Golden Screen TV Awards | Outstanding Natural History and Wildlife Program Host | Kim Atienza | Won |
| 2011 | Anak TV Awards | Makabata Star 2011 | Kim Atienza | Won |
| 2011 | Project Seven Thousand | Ambassador of the Pearl of the Orient | Kim Atienza | Won |
| 2010 | PMPC Star Awards for Television | Best Educational Program | Matanglawin | Won |
| 2010 | USTv Student's Choice Awards | Best Educational Program | Matanglawin | Won |
| 2010 | Gawad Tanglaw Awards | Best Educational Program | Matanglawin | Won |
| 2010 | Fr. Neri Satur Special Citation | Environmental Leadership in Arts and Media | Matanglawin | Won |
| 2010 | UPLB Gandingan Awards | Best Educational Program | Matanglawin | Won |
| 2010 | UPLB Gandingan Awards | Best Environmental-Oriented Program | Matanglawin | Won |
| 2010 | NWSSU Student's Choice Awards | Best Educational Program | Matanglawin | Won |
| 2010 | National Council for Children's Television-DepEd | Most Child-Friendly Educational Program | Matanglawin | Won |
| 2010 | Anak TV Awards | Best Educational Program | Matanglawin | Won |
| 2010 | Taiwan International Children's Film Festival | Best TV Program | Matanglawin | Nominated |
| 2010 | UPLB Gandingan Awards | Gandingan ng Edukasyon | Kim Atienza | Won |
| 2010 | UPLB Gandingan Awards | Gandingan ng Kabataan | Kim Atienza | Won |
| 2010 | UPLB Gandingan Awards | Gandingan ng Kalikasan | Kim Atienza | Won |
| 2010 | NWSSU Student's Choice Awards | Best Educational Program Host | Kim Atienza | Won |
| 2010 | Protected Areas and Wildlife Bureau | Ambassador of the 2010 International Year of Biodiversity | Kim Atienza | Won |
| 2010 | Philippine Eagle Foundation | National Ambassador for Endangered Philippine Eagles | Kim Atienza | Won |
| 2010 | Mister Earth Philippines Foundation | Award for Environmental Heroism | Kim Atienza | Won |
| 2010 | Anak TV Awards | Most Admired TV Personality | Kim Atienza | Won |
| 2010 | PMPC Star Awards for Television | Best Educational Program Host | Kim Atienza | Won |
| 2009 | Anak TV Seal Awards | Most Well Liked TV Program | Matanglawin | Won |
| 2009 | PMPC Star Awards for Television | Best Educational Program | Matanglawin | Won |
| 2009 | KBP Golden Dove Awards | Best Science and Technology Program for Television | Matanglawin | Won |
| 2009 | Philippine Society for the Study of Nature | Best Educational Program | Matanglawin | Won |
| 2009 | USTv Student's Choice Awards | Best Educational Program | Matanglawin | Won |
| 2009 | Gawad Tanglaw Awards | Best Educational Program | Matanglawin | Won |
| 2009 | Anak TV Seal Awards | Most Admired TV Male Personality | Kim Atienza | Won |
| 2009 | Philippine Society for the Study of Nature | Best Educational Program Host | Kim Atienza | Won |
| 2009 | Philippine Society for the Study of Nature | Kalikasan Awardee for Environmental Education | Kim Atienza | Won |
| 2009 | PMPC Star Awards for Television | Best Educational Program Host | Kim Atienza | Nominated |
| 2008 | KBP Golden Dove Awards | Best Science and Technology Program | Matanglawin | Won |
| 2008 | KBP Golden Dove Awards | Best Magazine Show | Matanglawin | Won |
| 2008 | Anak TV Seal Awards | Most Watched Television Program | Matanglawin | Won |
| 2008 | Asia Pacific Broadcasting Union | Special Commendation for best Children's Program | Matanglawin | Won |
| 2008 | PMPC Star Awards for Television | Best Educational Program | Matanglawin | Won |
| 2008 | PMPC Star Awards for Television | Best Educational Program Host | Kim Atienza | Won |

== See also ==
- Knowledge Power
- Umagang Kay Ganda
- ABS-CBN
- List of programs broadcast by ABS-CBN
- ABS-CBN News and Current Affairs
