= Ang Pagbabago =

2006 Philippine television reality show

- Title card
- Genre: Reality show
- Presented by: Diana Zubiri; Alfred Vargas
- Country of origin: Philippines
- Original language: Tagalog
- No. of episodes: 40

Production
- Camera setup: Multiple-camera setup
- Running time: 45 minutes
- Production company: GMA News and Public Affairs

Original release
- Network: GMA Network
- Release: July 10 – September 1, 2006

Ang Pagbabago (transl. the change) is a 2006 Philippine television reality show broadcast by GMA Network. Hosted by Diana Zubiri and Alfred Vargas, it premiered on July 10, 2006. The show concluded on September 1, 2006, with a total of 40 episodes.
