= Ernie Baron =

Filipino broadcaster (1940–2006)

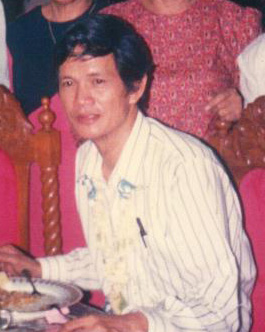
- Born: Ernesto J. Baron; August 15, 1940; Bacoor, Cavite, Philippines
- Died: January 23, 2006 (aged 65); Muntinlupa, Metro Manila, Philippines
- Resting place: Angelus Eternal Garden, Bacoor, Cavite, Philippines
- Occupations: Broadcaster, weather presenter
- Years active: 1967–2006
- Known for: The Philippine Walking Encyclopedia
- Spouse: Josephine Baron
- Children: 1

Ernesto "Ka Ernie" J. Baron (August 15, 1940 – January 24, 2006) was a Filipino television and radio presenter, and inventor. He spent more than 40 years in the field of broadcasting. He was best known as the weather presenter in the ABS-CBN's TV Patrol. He was also known as The Walking Encyclopedia of the Philippines.

== Career ==
Considered one of the pioneers of Radyo Patrol, which counts as contemporaries, among others, Rey Langit, Noli de Castro, Joe Taruc, Mario Garcia, Bobby Guanzon, Orly Mercado and Bong Lapira, Baron, started his radio career with the general information program Gintong Kaalaman on the old DZAQ, the forerunner of DZMM and later DWPM. During the Martial Law era, he also worked as one of the news anchors of the station DZSA 1230 kHz (now DWXI 1314 AM). He also became one of the personalities of DWAN 1206 Brodkast Patrol during the mid-'80s.

When ABS-CBN returned on the air after the Marcos regime, he hosted the radio program Knowledge Power as well as its television spin-off. He also advocated the use of herbal medicine called pito-pito and "cleansing diet" in his programs and media appearances, though his endorsement of alternative medicine was criticised by medical professionals as a promotion of quackery.

=== Other ventures ===
Besides acting as a weather anchor and general television presenter, Baron made a number of guest appearances in films and television series, usually portraying his usual occupation as an anchorman or weather reporter. He also made a cameo in the 2000 theatrical adaptation of Magandang Tanghali Bayan entitled Pera o Bayong (Not da TV), where he encountered the lead characters and gave them his signature line of advice "Kung walang knowledge, walang power!" (transl. "Without knowledge, there's no power!").

Baron served as the namesake and product ambassador for the Baron brand of television antennas and related consumer electronics products, which continued on past his death; fellow weather anchor and presenter Kim Atienza took over as the product ambassador and endorser for the Baron brand.

== Personal life ==
Baron was married to Josephine Baron and had one daughter named Shirley. The Barons are adherents of Iglesia ni Cristo, thus codifying his professional nickname "Ka Ernie".

== Death and legacy ==
Baron died of heart attack on the morning of January 23, 2006, at his home in Muntinlupa, at the age of 65. He was pronounced dead on arrival at the Muntinlupa Medical Center. Prior to his death, Baron had been diagnosed with kidney and liver problems.

Several months after his death, he was replaced by his protégé Kim Atienza as weather presenter of TV Patrol (then TV Patrol World), and the program's weather segment had been renamed "Weather Weather Lang" (now Weather Patrol).

A parody of Baron appeared in a Philippine trailer for the Korean zombie horror television series All of Us Are Dead as part of a promotional campaign for Netflix in the country.

== Awards ==
Event/Award-giving Body	Award	Reason/Program	Year
ABS-CBN	"one of 10 Most Interesting Personalities in 2001"		2000
16th PMPC Star Awards for Television	Best Educational TV Program Host	Knowledge Power ABS-CBN	2002
Film Achievers' Association	Broadcast Journalist of the Year		2005
