= 2006 in New Zealand television =

This is a list of New Zealand television-related events from 2006.

== Events ==
- 25 June - The 1983 Miss Universe Lorraine Downes and her partner Aaron Gilmore win the second series of Dancing with the Stars.
- 29 October - Matthew Saunoa wins the third and final series of New Zealand Idol.

== Debuts ==
=== Domestic ===
- 7 May - Sparkle Friends (TV2) (2006-2011)
- 25 May - Orange Roughies (TV One) (2006-2008)
- 21 July - The Killian Curse (TV2) (2006-2008)
- 18 December - Karaoke High (TVNZ) (2006-2007)
- The Lost Children (TVNZ) (2006)

=== International ===
- (United States) Curious George (TV3)
- (United States) Numbers (TV3)
- (United States) Prison Break (TV3)
- (United Kingdom) Prehistoric Park (TV3)
- (Canada) / (United Kingdom) Harry and His Bucket Full of Dinosaurs (TV3)
- (United States) Avatar: The Last Airbender (TV3)
- (United States) Firehouse Tales (TV2)
- (United States) Coconut Fred's Fruit Salad Island (TV2)

== New channels ==
=== Cable ===
- 1 August - Nickelodeon (New Zealand)

== Television shows ==
=== 2000s ===
- Dancing with the Stars (2005-2009)

== Ending this year ==
- 29 October - New Zealand Idol (TV2) (2004-2006)
