= Luis Santiago =

Filipino director (1977–2005)

Luigi Santiago
- Born: Luis Santiago; September 12, 1977; Quezon City, Philippines
- Died: June 8, 2005 (aged 27); Makati, Philippines
- Cause of death: murder, gunshot wound, stabbing
- Other name: Direk Luigi
- Occupations: Matinee idol, actor, model
- Years active: 2000–2005
- Parent(s): Roger Santiago (father); Irma Santiago (mother)
- Family: Nicolo Santiago; James Santiago (brother); Armi Santiago (sister)

Luis Gino "Luigi" Santiago (September 12, 1977 – June 8, 2005) was a Filipino TV director.

== Early life and education ==
Born to Roger and Irma Santiago in Quezon City, Luigi Santiago was raised in Belgium, Hong Kong, and New Jersey, United States. He studied film at New York University Tisch School of the Arts and also majored in Philippine Studies and minored in Theology.

He has two siblings: Nicolo and James Santiago (brother) and Armi Santiago (sister).

== Career ==
Santiago's popularity grew when he began directing Nginiig, a top-rated Philippines documentary-type TV show dealing with the paranormal. The series aired on ABS-CBN until 2006. In 2005, he began work on a film version of the show.

== Death ==
Santiago died on June 8, 2005, at the age of 27 prior to the commencement of the filming of the film version of his TV show, Nginiig.

On the night of his death, Santiago, accompanied by his peers, visited Venezia club, an upscale bar club in Glorietta, located in Makati. While they rested after a few drinks, a commotion broke out in the venue between two sets of female patrons, causing the club's security team to intervene while an unidentified male customer left to retrieve a pistol in his car. Upon returning, the intoxicated customer fired indiscriminately wherein a bullet fatally hit Santiago in the chest. As the suspect fled, Santiago was rushed to Makati Medical Center where he was pronounced dead on arrival.

His funeral was held at Santuario de San Antonio Church, Forbes Park, Makati on June 14, 2005, before his cremation at Loyola Guadalupe at 12:00 noon on that day. His remains are stored in the same graveyard where he was cremated.

== Filmography ==
=== TV director ===
Title	Year	Network
Nginiig	2004-2005	ABS-CBN

=== Writer ===
Title	Year
Umaaraw, Umuulan	2006

=== Actor ===
Title	Role	Year
3D	Cop #2	2000

=== Assistant director ===
Title	Year
3D	2000
