= Secrets of the Masters =

2009 Philippine television show

- Genre: Cooking show
- Presented by: Issa Litton
- Country of origin: Philippines
- Original language: Tagalog

Production
- Camera setup: Multiple-camera setup
- Running time: 45 minutes
- Production company: GMA Entertainment TV

Original release
- Network: Q
- Release: February 22, 2009 – 2009

Secrets of the Masters is a 2009 Philippine television cooking show broadcast by Q. Hosted by Issa Litton, it aired from February 22 to 2009.
