= Boarding Pass (TV program) =

Philippine television infotainment show

- Title card
- Genre: Infotainment
- Presented by: Mike Templo
- Country of origin: Philippines
- Original language: Tagalog

Production
- Camera setup: Multiple-camera setup
- Running time: 30 minutes
- Production company: Esquire TV Productions

Original release
- Network: GMA News TV
- Release: January 25 – April 5, 2014

Boarding Pass is a Philippine television infotainment show. The show focuses on immigration, finance, employment, and other concerns of Filipinos abroad. Hosted by Mike Templo, it premiered on January 25, 2014. The show concluded on April 5, 2014.
