= StarDance (Philippine TV series) =

- Genre: Reality competition
- Presented by: Marvin Agustin; Vanessa Del Bianco
- Country of origin: Philippines
- Original language: Filipino
- No. of episodes: 13

Original release
- Network: ABS-CBN
- Release: February 19 – May 21, 2005

StarDance: Search for the Dance Idols is a Philippine reality dance television show broadcast by ABS-CBN. Hosted by Marvin Agustin and Vanessa Del Bianco, it aired on the network's Saturday evening line up from February 19 to May 21, 2005, and was replaced by My Juan and Only.

== Hosts ==
Main hosts

- Marvin Agustin
- Vanessa Del Bianco

Co-hosts

- Bianca Gonzalez
- JC Cuadrado
- Archie Alemania

== Contestants ==
StarDance Contestants
Ryan Sabaybay	Winner
Froilan Antonio Dabalus	1st Runner-up
Jhoey Zulueta	2nd Runner-up
Daniel Cabrera	3rd Runner-up
Dang Palma	Eliminated
Jeff Coronel	Eliminated
D.J De Guzman	Eliminated
Leah Desamparado	Eliminated
Christaliza Sawada	Eliminated
Reina Victoria	Eliminated
Andrianne Gomez	Eliminated

=== Elimination ===
In every Saturday all dancers will perform according to the dance theme with a factor like dancing in the sea or dancing while standing in a thin pole then the judges gonna choose the bottom dancers which the judges did not like the performance and after the bottom dancers must perform with the factors used in the challenge to change there low scores. The lowest bottom dancer is eliminated with the score and public votes.

Date		Bottom 3
February 19	Froilan Dabalus	Daniel Cabrera	Leah Desamparado
February 26	Reina Victoria	Leah Desamparado (2)	Ryan Sabaybay
March 5	Christaliza Sawada	Leah Desamparado (3)	Bambi Candelaria
March 12	Leah Desamparado (4)	Bambi Candelaria (2)	Daniel Cabrera (2)
March 19	Daniel Cabrera (3)	Ryan Sabaybay (2)	D.J De Guzman
April 2	D.J De Guzman (2)	Jeff Coronel	Bambi Candelaria (3)
April 9	Wild Card
April 16	Leah Desamparado (5)	Jhoey Zulueta	D.J De Guzman (3)
April 23	D.J De Guzman (4)	Jhoey Zulueta (2)	Bambi Candelaria (4)
	Bottom 2
April 30	Jeff Coronel (2)	Jhoey Zulueta (3)
May 7	Jhoey Zulueta (4)	Christian Adrales
May 14	Dang Palma	Bambi Candelaria (5)
May 21	Bambi Candelaria	Christian Adrales	Ryan Sabaybay
