= Nginiiig! =

Television series

- Title card
- Genre: Reality television Horror; Docudrama
- Written by: Shugo Praico Randy Q. Villanueva; Michael Bernaldez; Janice O'Hara Zoilo Barrel
- Directed by: Luis Santiago
- Presented by: Raymond Bagatsing
- Theme music composer: Gloc-9
- Opening theme: "Nginig" by Gloc-9
- Ending theme: "Nginig" by Sandwich
- Country of origin: Philippines
- Original language: Tagalog
- No. of episodes: 108

Production
- Executive producers: Raymund G. Dizon; Arthur Katipunan
- Running time: 60 minutes
- Production companies: Star Creatives; ABS-CBN News and Current Affairs

Original release
- Network: ABS-CBN
- Release: March 6, 2004 – April 8, 2006

Nginiiig! (lit. 'shivers!') is a Philippine television reality horror show broadcast by ABS-CBN. Hosted by Raymond Bagatsing, then by Jericho Rosales, and finally Hero Angeles, with Luis Manzano, Marvin Agustin, Rayver Cruz, Maja Salvador and John Wayne Sace serving as substitute hosts or guest co-hosts, it aired from March 6, 2004 to April 8, 2006, replacing Knowledge Power.

== Format ==
The show is presented as a docudrama wherein it features real footage of paranormal stories through re-enactments based on the victims' account of the horrifying events. The victims are interviewed about the events that took place in the haunted venues and actors and actresses play them in the reconstructions. Similarly to the Undas episodes of the ABS-CBN telemagazine news program Magandang Gabi... Bayan, the haunted venues serve as studio settings for the show.

== Cancellation ==
Director Luis Santiago, died on June 8, 2005. Santiago, who had just completed a feature film version of the show, was passing by a bar in Makati when an intoxicated patron suddenly brandished a firearm and opened fire indiscriminately. A stray bullet from the shooting hit the director, fatally injuring him. Despite that, the series continued with an unnamed new director until its end on April 8, 2006.

== Spin-offs ==
Nginiiig: The Hidden Files and Nginiiig: Paranormal Investigation aired on the now defunct Studio 23, the latter was hosted by members of the Streetboys.

== Reruns ==
Reruns of the show's episodes airs on Jeepney TV. Select portions of some of its episodes were aired on Cine Mo! as part of its commercial breaks.

This series is currently aired on Kapamilya Online Live Global every Sunday morning.

== Promotion ==
The show was one of the shows chosen to be part of the Kasakay Mo, Kapamilya Mo MRT ad campaign launched by ABS-CBN in 2005.

== Historical connections ==
Many paranormal stories presented in the series have connections to real-life historic events. These include World War II, Japanese occupation of the Philippines, Marcos Martial law, Leyte landslide, Ozone disco club fire, 1990 Luzon earthquake, 1991 Pinatubo eruption, and many others.

== Episodes ==
=== Raymond Bagatsing ===
Episode	Title	Summary	Notes
1	Leyte	A tragic landslide that occurred in December 2003 in Li-Loan Leyte buries and kills over 122 people. The spirits of the victims haunt the site of the incident. The episode is divided into three stories: “Paramdam ni Pedro”, “Huling Hiling sa Hukay”, and “Ang Dalawang Bata sa Krus”.	
2	New Manila	The affluent New Manila neighborhood located in the Mariana district of Quezon City is haunted by spirits dating back to the pre-World War II period and the 1942-1945 Japanese occupation of the Philippines. One of these spirits is a decapitated priest/friar who lived and was murdered by the Kenpeitai and is known to frequent the neighborhood and a church situated in it. Another of the spirits are that of a couple; the man murders his fiancée and later kills himself in one of the residences, which still stands to this day.	
3	Haunted Hospital	The Nginiig team investigate the lingering spirits of the departed patients in several hospitals, one of which is the Philippine General Hospital, the affiliate hospital of the University of the Philippines Manila's College of Medicine. “Ang Misyon ni Robbie” and “Ang Habilin Ni Allan” are the featured stories in this episode.	
4	Tikbalang ("Centaur")	Raymond Bagatsing and his resident psychics investigate the truth behind the abduction of Ireneo “Nyok” Villanueva. He is said to be abducted by a “tikbalang” or centaur, a creature that is half-man and half-horse.	
5	Pagbalik sa Guho ("Return to the Landslide Ruins")	The Nginiig team returns to Leyte to investigate new hauntings at the site of the December 2003 landslide that killed over 209 people in Leyte. In this episode, three stories are featured: “Babae sa Kapilya,” “Multo sa Pinto,” and “Isang Pagbati.”	
6	Haunt for Rent	A rental apartment in Quezon City and a boarding house in Caloocan are said to be the sites of paranormal activity. The hauntings have forced many boarders and tenants into moving out of the said places for the spirits want these properties to remain undisturbed.	
7	Chop-Chop White Lady	A lawyer and his wife build an apartment building complex in Caloocan to operate as a sideline business in hopes that it would help them maintain a stable income. Unknowingly, the site of their apartment is the grave of a young woman whose spirit appears in her bloodied form or as dismembered parts of her body. While living in the apartment, the lawyer, his family and household staff also get a full glimpse of the spirit, causing them to move out and start anew. Like them, other tenants renting units are also tormented by the woman's spirit into moving out of the property for its demand to remain undisturbed. The spirit is eventually revealed to be that of a young bride who was murdered and dismembered alongside her groom on their wedding day by her jealousy-driven former lover, who was ironically chosen by the groom to be their best man.	
8	U-Belt Boarding House	An old dormitory building in the University Belt in Manila is haunted by the spirits of a young woman and a man who lived in the same dormitory building. Both spirits have a tragic backstory on why they remained in the dormitory; the young woman fell victim to an unplanned pregnancy after a premarital sex affair with her married lover and hanged herself in one of the rooms out of shame after aborting her unborn child while the young man was murdered in the building during the Martial Law era. The ghost sightings have forced many students to move out of the dorm.	
9	Cemetery Mansion	A wealthy woman owns a mansion situated on a vast hectare of land located next door to the town's graveyard. The woman also shares her home with the spirits from the same graveyard, the majority of whom are benevolent and kind. One of these spirits is that of her late mother.	
10	Barang	Raymond Bagatsing and his resident psychics investigate about the mysterious hex called “barang” that has beleaguered three victims, whose bodies are stricken with worms and other insects.	
11	Beach Resort	The Lido Beach Resort in Cavite is a popular destination for people in living in Metro Manila due to its close proximity to the capital and is often used by production companies to shoot beach scenes if other beaches in the province are not feasible. However, it is also haunted by spirits and specters, which have been scaring the tourists, employees, and even the caretakers of the resort. It is later discovered that several brutal rapes and murders took place in resort's very cottages, which is the reason why the victims' restless spirits still roam the vicinity.	
12	Sanib	In this episode, the Nginiig team investigate a series of demonic possessions while also hearing stories of people who have performed exorcisms.	
13	Haunted Pugot	A small town in the province of Pangasinan comes to light when stories of encountering a living disembodied head spreads. Residents of the town have stumbled upon the living disembodied head, which has been scaring them and has caused a couple of unexplained deaths. The head is believed to be the spirit of a local named Agapito Zaldua, who was killed by his own son after discovering that his father has killed his mother.	
14	Sociego House	Often used in movies and television shows, the Tuason mansion in Sociego, Quezon City is a recognizable landmark but also has a tragic history. Built in 1930, the house was a witness to brutal atrocities during the Japanese occupation of the Philippines during World War II. The house and areas around it also served as sites where murders committed by the Kenpeitai took place. Famous celebrities and veteran actors and director recall the times when they have seen or felt the strange presence in the mansion while they are working. In two occasions, the ghost's presence is even recorded in film.	The house in this episode was later dismantled and demolished in the 2010s by DMCI and transferred to its Acacia estates subdivision in Taguig city wherein it was rebuilt in its original design as "Casa Real". It now serves as a sought-after events venue in the area while the original site of the house is currently occupied by a condominium building named "Sorrel Residences". Pia Wurtzbach (of Miss Universe fame) plays the role of Neri Naig, who encounters a ghost during a filming session.
15	Possession	Raymond Bagatsing and his resident psychics investigate Christy Boadilla's seven-day ordeal with a hostile spirit that possessed her body.	
16	Premature death	Nginiig sets out to help a mother find out why her son has killed himself and why his spirit still haunts them long after his death.	
17	Haunted Ambulance	An ambulance from a small hospital in Cavite is frequented by spirits of the patients who either died in the said vehicle while on the way to the hospital or have reached the hospital during the final moments of their lives. Drivers claim that they often lose control of the vehicle, and like the nurses, doctors, and paramedics, they could sense and sometimes see the aforementioned ghosts of the patients, the majority of who cannot enter the afterlife due to being unable to accept their deaths. With the help of psychics and clerics, the ambulance is cleansed and the spirits are freed. It has since become the custom of the hospital to have not only the said ambulance but also its other ambulances blessed each month.	
18	Curse	Beth lives a normal life until her former classmate Julian suddenly shows up. Since school days, the guy has a deep admiration for her. This feeling provokes Julian to use his power and cast a strong curse against Beth and her family.	
19	Aswang: Part 1	Nginiig probes on the news about the existence of “aswangs” in a small town in Antique. Erlinda Victoria tells the story of how her father has bravely slain the monsters from their town. She brings the “Nginig” crew to the home of the people, whom she believes come from a family of “aswangs”	
20	Aswang: Part 2	In the second part of the Aswang episode, Nginiig returns to Antique to investigate the case of Felicidad Gracia. In 1984, Felicidad Divina Gracia is arrested when five corpses of children are found rotting in her home. The local townsfolk are convinced that Felicidad murdered her victims and used their flesh as one of the ingredients in the delicious dishes that she sells.	
21	Isabela's Haunted Mansion	A wealthy woman named Norma Morales and her family own a vast piece of land and property in Isabela, which they purchased years ago. While everything seem peaceful at start, things take turns for a worse when the family and their household staff experience frequent sightings of ghosts and spirits in the property, where their home also stands. Norma seeks the help of Nginiig to help cleanse the property and put the spirits to rest. During the sessions, they learn that the ghosts are spirits of the townsfolk who were brutally murdered on the same land by the Japanese forces and the Kenpeitai. The reason their spirits and the Kenpeitai's ghosts frequent the area is because they guard valuable treasures buried in the site, which was later unearthed by the Morales family when they purchased the land and moved in.	
22	Duwendeng Itim (Black Dwarves)	A once peaceful home in Sta. Mesa, Manila turns chaotic when a young girl is often disturbed by hostile black dwarves who want to harm her and her sisters. Nginiig travels to the home to help the family and fight back the forces of evil.	
23	Bangkay sa Balon (Corpse in the Well)	Tina has gone missing for months and her family is beginning to lose hope that she could ever be found. In this episode, Raymond Bagatsing and the “Nginig” psychics discover how Tina's ghost, who has appeared many times in her father's dream, has helped her family in finding her rotting corpse buried deep inside an old, abandoned well.	
24	Third Eye	Actor Ian Veneracion may be well known to many but what no one knows is that he possesses a third eye.	
25	Viva Hotbabes Stories	Two members of the Filipino pop group Viva Hotbabes Gwen Garci and JC Parker tell of deceased fans visiting them often.	
26	Guardian Ghosts	Viva Hotbabes member Katya Santos and actor Luis Alandy share paranormal experiences.	
27	Back from the Grave	Actresses Roxanne Guinoo and Rica Peralejo are haunted by their deceased grandparents.	
28	Manila City Hall	Nginiig investigates the hauntings of the coffin-shaped Manila City Hall, eventually discovering its role in World War II and the Japanese Occupation of the Philippines. Several employees, including then-city councilor Isko Moreno, and other officials, claim of seeing the spirits of war victims. However, they also encounter two more spirits dating back to the post-war years, such as a plaintiff who committed suicide and a woman murdered in the city hall's courtroom, who later becomes the building's resident white lady.	Isko Moreno served as councilor of the City of Manila when the episode was filmed. He later became the city's vice mayor and eventually, mayor from 2019 to 2022.
29	A Family of Ghosts/Cainta's Haunted House	While still living in his old home, actor Hero Angeles discovers that it is also the residence of a family of ghosts with tragic backstories. The ghosts would help Hero win Star Circle Quest and after the Angeleses move out, the family of spirits find peace. Meanwhile, a house in Cainta is home to restless spirits.	
30	Abortionist/Abused Child	A young girl who became pregnant while still a student undergoes abortion under two women. Unknown to the parties involved, the souls of the aborted children return from the afterlife to haunt them. Meanwhile, actress Anne Curtis discovers that the house she lives in is home to the ghosts of two children: one was an aborted child, who was buried in the garden while her still-living sister is frequently abused by her mother/aunt after the death of the latter's sibling.	
31	Amaranhig (a.k.a. The Resurrecting Corpse)	The Nginiig team investigates a series of phenomena wherein the corpses are resurrected, of which they identify as the Amaranhig, people who died but want to escape their fate. One of these is a mother and daughter whose patriarch, a faith healer, was shot to death by a drunken military sergeant, but later returns to life to avenge his death.	
32	Electric Chair	The New Bilibid Prison (formerly Muntinlupa City Jail) has housed many inmates from all walks of life and has also played important roles in history. Like its old counterpart, now the Manila City Jail, the New Bilibid Prison is host to many executions, the most notorious being Building 14, which houses the death row cell block and electric chair, the method used from 1924 until 1976, when then-sitting president Ferdinand Marcos Sr. reverted executions to firing squad. Numerous paranormal incidents occurred in the prison but the most notorious are the electric chair chamber and death row cellblock. Both guards and a prison nurse assigned to this row as well as some death row inmates are often visited by souls of the executed prisoners. The former chief executioner, corrections officer Deo Dador confirmed that the hauntings continued even after the electric chair house was abandoned following its destruction by fire, and a new death house was built nearby to house lethal injection executions. Nginiig visits Bilibid to cleanse the long-abandoned ruins of the electric chair chamber and make its restless residents depart.	Building 14, where the electric chair chamber stood alongside the original death row cellblock was turned into a disciplinary area for inmates in the 1980s until a fire destroyed it in July 1986 due to faulty electrical wiring. In 1996, it was renovated and reused for the same purpose, with the old electric chair chamber left untouched and components of the electric chair being placed in the Bilibid museum. As of 2014, the area was renovated again and currently serves as a cell block for high-risk inmates. Deo Dador, the chief executioner during the electric chair era is prominently featured in this episode. His story will be told again in another ABS-CBN show, Maalaala Mo Kaya.
33	Cemetery	Nginiig investigates a cemetery in Teresa, Rizal, known for numerous transfers of remains.	
34			
35	School Possession	A school of Santa Ana in Pateros turns chaotic when students are possessed by unknown entities. It is revealed that the spirits are restless souls of two women who died after suffering the abuse from their tormentors.	
36	Incorruptible Remains	Nginiig investigates the mystery of a dead resident's corpse in Samal Island, which brings fortunes to believers.	
37	Pa-Siyam House	The Luciano Ancestral House in Magalang, Pampanga, is among many ancestral homes used as film sets. While filming the 2004 horror film Pa-Siyam, the cast and crew have an encounter with the spirits of the deceased Lucianos, who happen to be harmless ghosts. They also encounter the spirit of a famous actress and model who was taken in by the Lucianos and treated as a daughter when she was finishing her studies.	The Luciano house was also used for Star Circle Quest Season 2. It stood for many years and was later partially dismantled in 2021.
38	Panaderia (Bakery)	A bakery in Caloocan is the dwelling of restless spirits and elements who bear witness to a forbidden relationship.	
39	National Library	The National Library of the Philippines, which houses the original copies of Rizal's novels, is home to eighty restless spirits from the war years. Employee Jerald meets the spirits and discovers their past.	
40	Awog	Nginiig investigates the mystery of deathly curses used upon wrongdoers.	
41	Recap	This episode recalls the most favorite segments and subjects of the series.	

=== Luis Manzano era ===
Episode no.	Title	Summary	Notes
43	The Spirits of the Landslide	Four successive typhoons (Unding, Violeta, Winnie and Yoyong) hit Quezon province from November to December 2004, inducing landslides in the upland areas and inundating the lowland and coastal areas where flashfloods carrying logs, rocks and thick mud covered community settlements and agricultural farm. The storm quartet also left over 1,068 dead, 1,061 injured, and 500 missing. Residents of the areas are still haunted by the townsfolk who perished during the incident, even if they have recovered the bodies for a proper burial.	

=== Marvin Agustin era ===
Episode No.	Title	Summary	Notes
44	Aswang sa Bulacan	Nginiig investigates the mysteries of evil forces disturbing residents of a village in San Juan del Monte, Bulacan	
48	Abandoned Child	Having been abandoned by his parents as a child, Kevin summons dark forces to feel accepted once again.	

=== Jericho Rosales era ===
Episode No.	Title	Summary	Notes
45	Lihim ng Marikina River (Secrets of Marikina River)	A part of Marikina River in Marikina City is reputed to be haunted due to a series of unexplained drownings. The majority of the victims have been fisherfolk and other locals, who are frequently disturbed by hostile mermen. Nginiig investigates this portion and finds out that the spirit of a girl who died in the place during the 1940s seeks peace.	

=== Rica Peralejo era ===
Episode No.	Title	Summary	Notes
46	Lopez Residence	The second floor of a home in Sta. Cruz, Laguna is home to lost souls, who teach the house proprietor of the most important wealth of life: family.	
47	Maria Labo		

=== Cruz, Salvador, Sace guesting era ===
Episode No.	Title	Summary	Notes
47	A Night at Ozone Disco	The night of March 18, 1996 turns from fun to tragedy as a fire breaks out at Ozone Disco, killing 196 patrons and injuring a dozen hundreds, all of whom were high school and college graduates celebrating the end of the school year, with some undergraduates joining along. Ghosts from the incident return from the grave to haunt their families and other survivors of the tragedy. People who pass the Ozone Disco site are also haunted by the deceased victims, who still cry out for justice.	

=== Hero Angeles era ===
The Hero Angeles era was the last to feature Luigi Santiago as director. After Santiago's death in 2005, the series continued under a different director, with Angeles continuing to host.

Episode Number	Title	Summary	Notes
TBA	Radio Station/Laundry Shop	DWDD-AM in Camp Aguinaldo is home to two personnel who were murdered in the camp. Meanwhile, a laundromat where a mother and son work is haunted by a woman who they later discover, committed suicide in the same area the shop stands after suffering from the abuses of her spouse.	

== See also ==
- List of programs broadcast by ABS-CBN
- List of programs broadcast by Jeepney TV
