= 2005 in Norwegian television =

This is a list of Norwegian television related events from 2005.

== Events ==
- 30 January - TVN joined forces with Kanal5 from Sweden to co-produce the Scandinavian version of Big Brother.
- 20 May - Jorun Stiansen wins the third series of Idol, becoming the show's first female winner.
- 22 May - Britt Goodwin wins the first series of the Scandinavian version of Big Brother for Norway.

== Debuts ==
- 30 January - The Scandinavian version of Big Brother (2005-2006, 2014–present)

== Television shows ==
=== 2000s ===
- Idol (2003-2007, 2011–present)

== Networks and services ==
=== Launches ===
Network	Type	Launch date	Notes	Source
VOX	Cable television	23 January		
Viasat Film	Cable television	3 March		
Viasat Sport 24	Cable television	24 April		
Viasat Sport N	Cable television	29 November		

=== Conversions and rebrandings ===
Old network name	New network name	Type	Conversion Date	Notes	Source
TV2 Xtra	TV2 Zebra	Cable television	Unknown		
MTV	MTV	Cable television	18 February		

== See also ==
- 2005 in Norway
