= Adyenda =

Philippine television public affairs show

- Title card used from 2016 to 2018
- Genre: Public affairs
- Presented by: Joel Villanueva; Alex Tinsay
- Country of origin: Philippines
- Original language: Tagalog

Production
- Executive producer: Joash Bermejo
- Producer: Jean Perez
- Editor: Rowin Alaska
- Camera setup: Multiple-camera setup
- Running time: 30–60 minutes
- Production companies: Light TV News and Public Affairs

Original release
- Network: ZOE Broadcasting Network (2005, 2008–11); GMA Network (2005–17); Q (2005–11); Light TV (2008–17); GMA News TV (2011–18)
- Release: August 23, 2005 – January 5, 2018

Adyenda (transl. agenda) is a Philippine television public affairs show broadcast by GMA Network, GMA News TV and Light TV. Originally hosted by Joel Villanueva, it premiered on August 23, 2005. The show concluded on January 5, 2018. Alex Tinsay served as the final host.

== Hosts ==
- Joel Villanueva (2005–16)
- Alex Tinsay (2016–18)

== Accolades ==
Accolades received by Adyenda
Year	Award	Category	Recipient	Result	Ref.
2010	Anak TV Seal Awards		Adyenda	Won	
2012	Anak TV Seal Awards		Adyenda	Won	
2013	27th PMPC Star Awards for Television	Best Public Affairs Program	Adyenda	Nominated	
2013	27th PMPC Star Awards for Television	Best Public Affairs Program Host	Joel Villanueva	Nominated	
2014	28th PMPC Star Awards for Television	Best Public Affairs Program	Adyenda	Nominated	
2014	28th PMPC Star Awards for Television	Best Public Affairs Program Host	Joel Villanueva	Nominated	
2016	Anak TV Seal Awards		Adyenda	Won	
