= Hapinas =

Philippine television show

- Genre: Breakfast comedy
- Created by: Zest Content
- Directed by: Jay Bustamante
- Presented by: Jay Bustamante; Carlo Gonzales; Denise Gonzales; Ira Pozon; Joaqui Tupas
- Opening theme: "Hapinas" by Magoo Marjon
- Country of origin: Philippines
- Original language: Tagalog

Production
- Executive producer: Gema Gochuico
- Camera setup: Multiple-camera setup
- Running time: 30 minutes

Original release
- Network: QTV
- Release: April 1, 2006 – February 1, 2008

Hapinas is a Philippine television show broadcast by QTV. It aired simulcast over Moms Radio. It premiered on April 1, 2006. The show concluded on February 1, 2008.

== About the program ==
Hapinas was a Filipino television program that redefined the traditional morning or breakfast show format by creating an engaging and entertaining atmosphere. Typically aired in the early morning, the program served as a backdrop for viewers as they went about their daily routines. For at least 30 minutes, it captivated the audience with humor, often eliciting laughter and joy during challenging times.

Designed to uplift spirits, Hapinas provided a “lean-forward” viewing experience, encouraging active engagement from its audience. The program successfully integrated branded content segments for various sponsors, effectively blending entertainment with advertising. Each segment prominently featured the product name, utilizing visual elements from the associated advertising campaigns to enhance its appeal.

With a format that prioritized relatable humor over professional comedy, Hapinas showcased everyday individuals sharing their favorite jokes, ensuring that every viewer could contribute to the laughter. The production team at Estima was responsible for conceptualizing and producing branded content that not only entertained but also aligned with product narratives, creating a unique synergy between programming and advertising.
