= My Juan and Only =

2005–06 Philippine television comedy drama series

- Genre: Comedy; Drama
- Starring: Aaron Juantas
- Country of origin: Philippines
- Original language: Filipino
- No. of episodes: 36

Original release
- Network: ABS-CBN
- Release: May 28, 2005 – January 28, 2006

My Juan and Only is a Philippine comedy/drama series broadcast by ABS-CBN. Starring Aaron Juantas, Ai-Ai Delas Alas and Randy Santiago, it aired on the network's Saturday evening line up from May 28, 2005 to January 28, 2006, replacing StarDance and was replaced by Komiks.

== Cast ==
- Aaron Junatas as Juan
- Ai-Ai delas Alas as Mercy
- Randy Santiago as Harry
- Nova Villa as Juan's grandmother
- John Prats as Henry
- Toni Gonzaga as Beth
- Vhong Navarro as Ferdie
- Paw Diaz as Sandra
- Long Mejia as Attorney
- Nash Aguas as Newtone
- Dagul as Corny
- Julijo Pisk as Rowan
- Angelo Garcia as Darius
- Andre Tiangco as Ramil Samaniego

== See also ==
- List of ABS-CBN original programming
