= Na-Scam Ka Na Ba? =

Philippine television documentary show

- Title card
- Genre: Documentary
- Presented by: Leo Martinez; Maureen Larrazabal
- Country of origin: Philippines
- Original language: Tagalog

Production
- Camera setup: Multiple-camera setup
- Running time: 31–48 minutes
- Production company: GMA Entertainment TV

Original release
- Network: QTV
- Release: June 20 – October 10, 2006

Na-Scam Ka Na Ba? (transl. were you scammed?) is a 2006 Philippine television documentary show broadcast by QTV. Hosted by Leo Martinez and Maureen Larrazabal, it premiered on June 20, 2006. The show concluded on October 10, 2006.

The show is streaming online on YouTube.

== Premise ==
The show features scams on a particular topic. The show features confessions of various con artists and details of how they scammed their victims. It also relates the stories of individuals who lost money and property to scam artists. Some people featured on the show are still traumatized by the experience; their faces are covered by shadows and their names replaced. This show warns viewers to be careful of scammers and their "shady schemes and malicious operations" and gives tips on how to avoid being a victim.

The show is considered "infotainment" and is presented in a factual but entertaining manner. As co-host, Maureen Larrazabal, stated, "It is done in a light and funny way so it doesn’t come across as hurtful to persons who experienced first-hand the scenarios we act out.".
