= Diyos at Bayan =

Philippine television public affairs show

- Title card since 2024
- Genre: Talk show; Public affairs
- Written by: Jeg Gascon
- Presented by: Eddie Villanueva
- Opening theme: "May Pagasa Pa!"
- Country of origin: Philippines
- Original language: Tagalog

Production
- Executive producer: Arlene Retania
- Camera setup: Multiple-camera setup
- Running time: 60 minutes

Original release
- Network: ZOE TV/Light TV (1998–2005, since 2008); RPN (1998–2001; 2002–05); NBN (2001–02); GMA Network (2006–19); QTV/Q (2005–11); GMA News TV (2011–19); A2Z (since 2021)
- Release: August 21, 1998 – present

Diyos at Bayan (transl. God and nation) is a Philippine television public affairs talk show broadcast by ZOE TV/Light TV. Hosted by Eddie Villanueva, it premiered on August 21, 1998.

The show was broadcast by RPN from 1998 to 2001 and 2002 to 2005 and by NBN from 2001 to 2002.

Diyos at Bayan concluded on June 3, 2019, on GMA Network (from 2006) and GMA News TV (from 2011; formerly QTV/Q from 2005 to 2011 and currently GTV since 2021), due to the termination of the blocktime agreement between GMA Network Inc., Citynet Network Marketing and Productions and ZOE Broadcasting Network on April 24, 2019, which took effect on June 4. On December 12, 2021, the show returned to its original home on Channel 11, this time through A2Z which is a partnership between ZOE Broadcasting Network and ABS-CBN Corporation. At the same time, the show is reformatted as a virtual public affairs talk show.

== Hosts ==
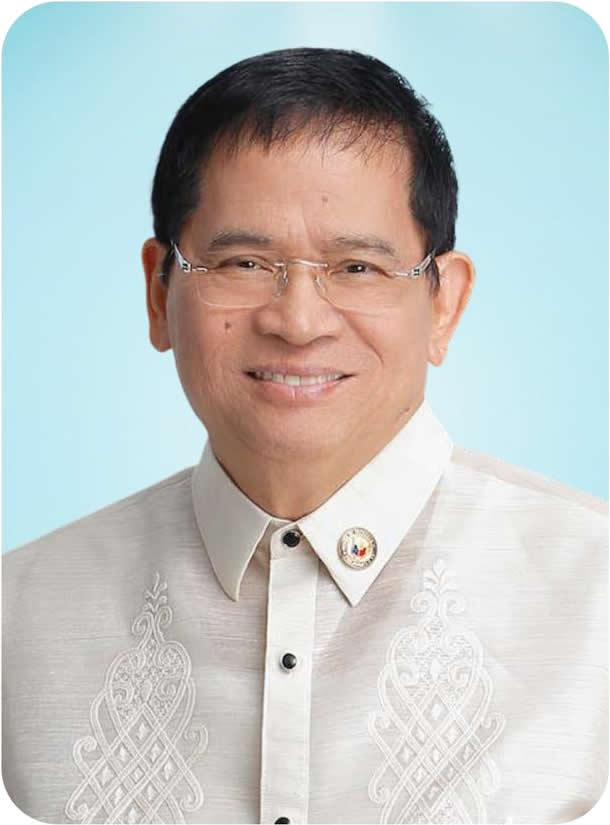
Eddie Villanueva serves as a host.

- Eddie Villanueva (1998–2004, 2004–10, since 2011)
- Kata Inocencio (2004–2010, 2011–14, since 2021)
- Alex Tinsay (2010, since 2019)
- Carlo Lorenzo (2010, 2015–16)
- K. A. Antonio (2015–16)
- Cel de Guzman (since 2016)
- Stanley Clyde Flores (since 2019)
