= Reunions (Philippine TV series) =

Philippine television show

- Title card
- Also known as: Sana'y Muling Makapiling
- Genre: Public broadcasting
- Presented by: Jessica Soho
- Country of origin: Philippines
- Original language: Tagalog

Production
- Camera setup: Multiple-camera setup
- Running time: 30–45 minutes
- Production company: GMA Public Affairs

Original release
- Network: QTV/Q
- Release: November 15, 2005 – February 20, 2011

Reunions (formerly Sana'y Muling Makapiling) is a Philippine television public affairs show broadcast by QTV/Q. Hosted by Jessica Soho, it premiered on November 15, 2005. The show concluded on February 20, 2011.

The show is streaming online on YouTube.

== Overview ==
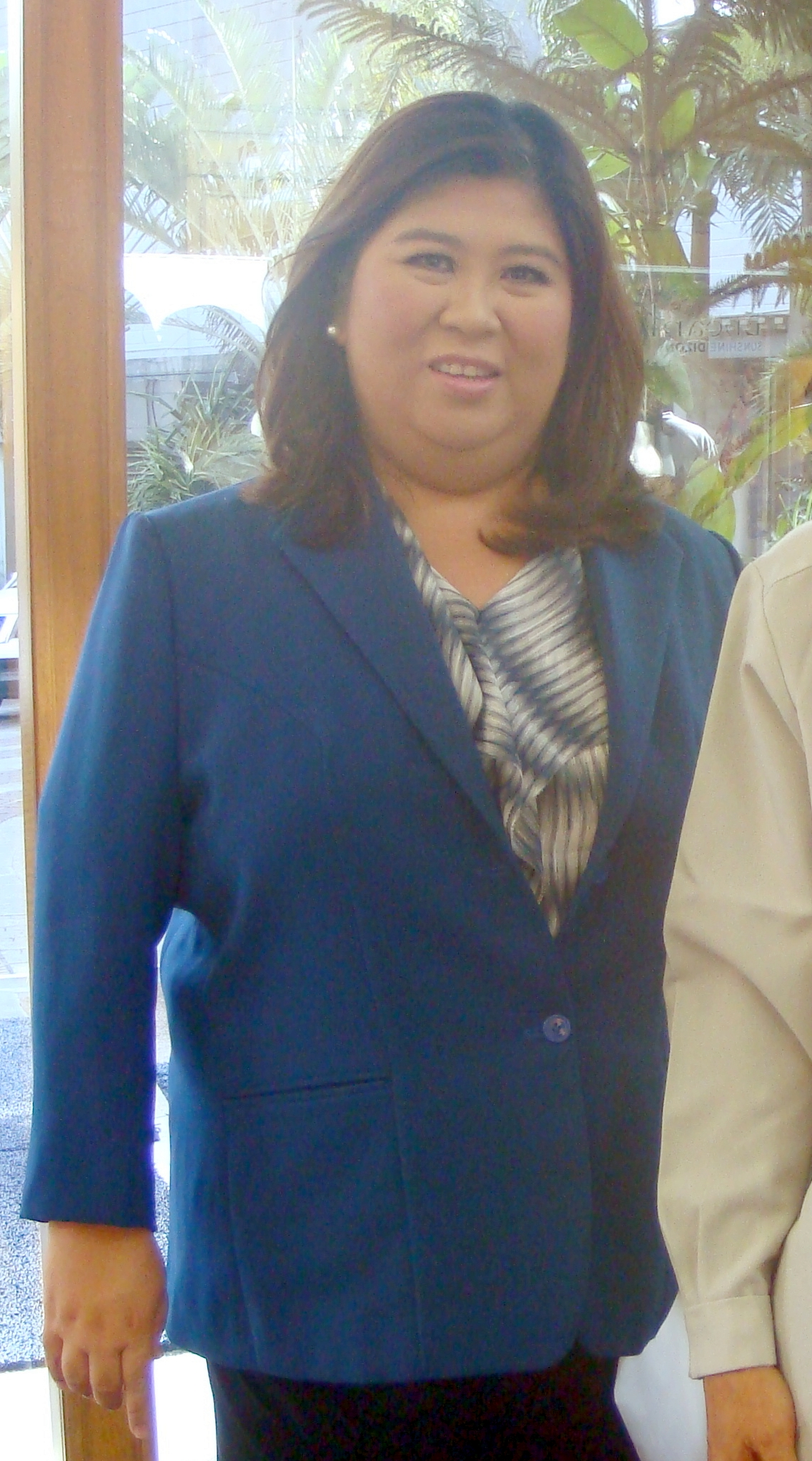
Jessica Soho serves as a host.

The show aimed to reconnect families with their long-lost loved ones with the help of the government and private groups. Often, the cases involved young children or senior citizens. The series searches for missing persons by looking over the Comelec's voting list or the National Statistics Office records for data on the person. Then they flash the missing person’s name and photo on air. Aside from searching for missing persons, the series also advises televiewers on how they can avoid these situations.

The idea for the show came back when Jessica Soho was still hosting the late-night magazine show Jessica Soho Reports before she was moved to primetime with Kapuso Mo, Jessica Soho. During one slow news week, Soho came up with the idea of reporting on a story about missing children. Their first episode with that concept showed three missing children. A day after the episode aired, all three children were reunited with their families.

From that episode, a weekly program locating missing persons was launched. It was first known as Sana'y Muling Makapiling and later changed its title to Reunions. The show aired on Tuesdays at 10 p.m., primetime. By 2007, more than 200 reunions were featured.

In six years, by the time show ended, 800 families were reunited. When the show ended, the concept lived on in Kapuso Mo, Jessica Soho.

== Accolades ==
Accolades received by Reunions
Year	Award	Category	Recipient	Result	Ref.
2007	21st PMPC Star Awards for Television	Best Public Service Program	Sana'y Muling Makapiling	Nominated	
2007	21st PMPC Star Awards for Television	Best Public Service Program Host	Jessica Soho	Nominated	
2008	22nd PMPC Star Awards for Television	Best Public Service Program Host	Jessica Soho	Nominated	
2008	Asian TV Awards	Best Reality Program	Reunions	Nominated	
2009	US International Film & Video Festival (USIFVF)	Certificate for Creative Excellence	Reunions	Included	
2009	23rd PMPC Star Awards for Television	Best Public Service Program	Reunions	Nominated	
2009	23rd PMPC Star Awards for Television	Best Public Service Program Host	Jessica Soho	Nominated	
2010	Sisa Media Awards	Outstanding Public Service Program	Reunions	Included	
2010	24th PMPC Star Awards for Television	Best Public Service Program Host	Jessica Soho	Nominated	
