= At Your Service-Star Power =

Philippine television public affairs show

- Title card
- Also known as: At Your Service
- Genre: Public affairs
- Presented by: Rhea Santos; Iza Calzado
- Country of origin: Philippines
- Original language: Tagalog

Production
- Camera setup: Multiple-camera setup
- Running time: 60 minutes
- Production company: GMA News and Public Affairs

Original release
- Network: GMA Network (2004–05); QTV/Q (2005–07)
- Release: May 1, 2004 – October 2007

At Your Service-Star Power is a Philippine television public affairs show broadcast by GMA Network. Originally hosted by Rhea Santos as At Your Service, it premiered on May 1, 2004. It later moved to QTV in November 2005 with Iza Calzado serving as the host. The show concluded in October 2007.
