= Hongkong Flight 143 =

2006 Philippine television drama series

- Genre: Drama
- Created by: Kitchie Benedicto
- Directed by: Kitchie Benedicto
- Starring: Pauleen Luna; Mark Herras; James Blanco
- Country of origin: Philippines
- Original language: Tagalog
- No. of episodes: 58

Production
- Executive producer: Kitchie Benedicto
- Production locations: Philippines; Hong Kong
- Camera setup: Multiple-camera setup
- Running time: 30 minutes
- Production companies: KB Entertainment Unlimited, Inc.

Original release
- Network: GMA Network
- Release: February 20 – May 12, 2006

Hongkong Flight 143 is a 2006 Philippine television drama series broadcast by GMA Network. Directed by Kitchie Benedicto, it stars Pauleen Luna, Mark Herras and James Blanco. It premiered on February 20, 2006. The series concluded on May 12, 2006, with a total of 58 episodes.

== Cast and characters ==
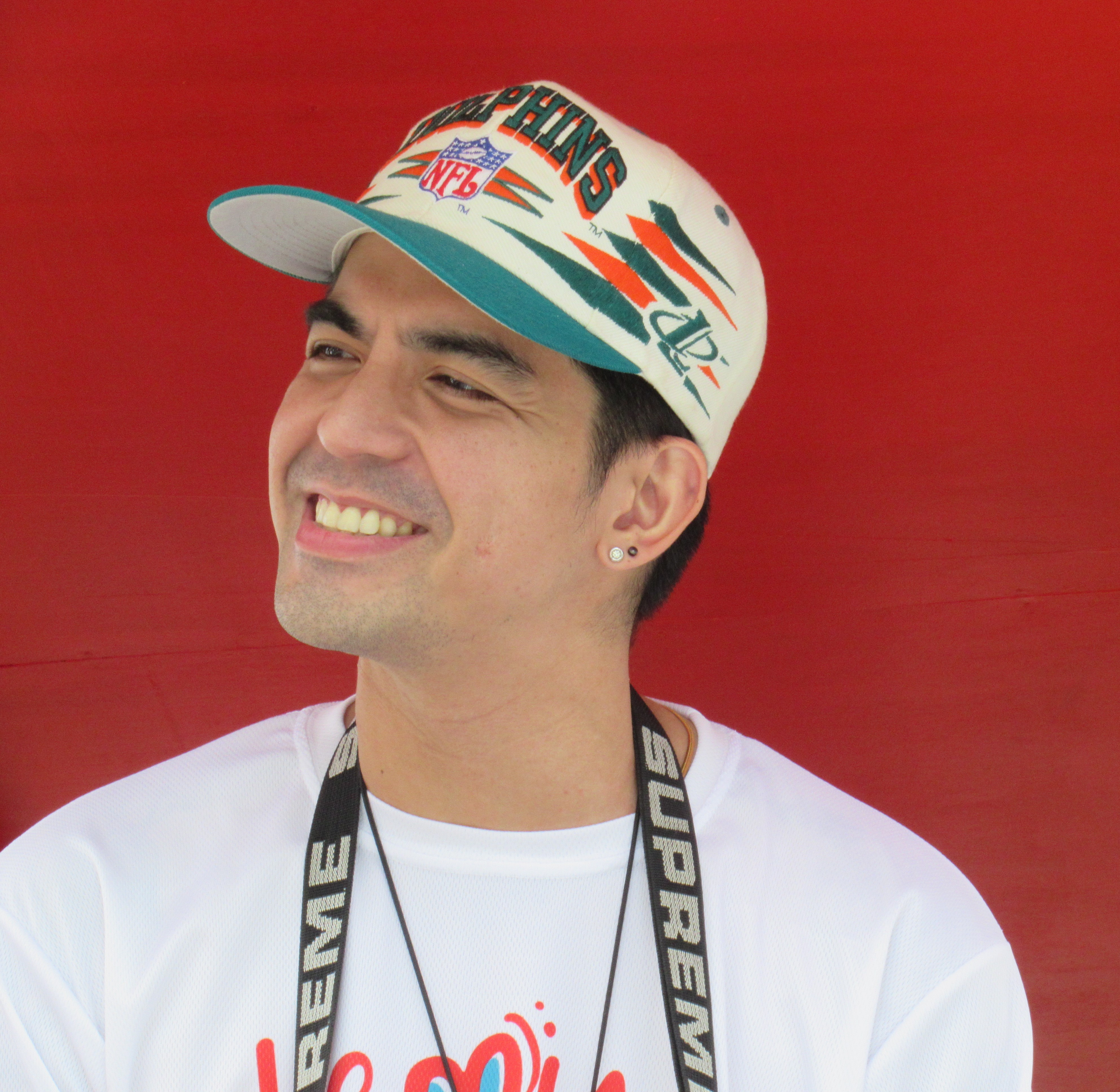
Mark Herras portrays Bogz.

Lead cast

- Mark Herras as Bogz
- Pauleen Luna as Trina
- James Blanco as Andy

Supporting cast

- Jackie Lou Blanco
- Rez Cortez
- Robert Ortega
- Danica Sotto
- Lovely Rivero
- Tessie Villarama
