= Laugh to Laugh: Ang Kulit! =

Philippine television sketch comedy show

- Genre: Sketch comedy
- Presented by: Ryan Yllana; Boy 2 Quizon; Jaja Gonzales; Boom Boom Gonzales; Julia Clarete
- Country of origin: Philippines
- Original language: Tagalog

Production
- Camera setup: Multiple-camera setup
- Running time: 30 minutes
- Production company: GMA Entertainment TV

Original release
- Network: QTV
- Release: November 11, 2005 – April 28, 2006

Laugh to Laugh: Ang Kulit! is a Philippine television sketch comedy sketch show broadcast by QTV. Hosted by Ryan Yllana, Boy 2 Quizon, Jaja Gonzales, Boom Boom Gonzales and Julia Clarete, it premiered on November 11, 2005. The show concluded on April 28, 2006.
