= 1994 in Philippine television =

The following is a list of events affecting Philippine television in 1994. Events listed include television show debuts, finales, cancellations, and channel launches, closures and rebrandings, as well as information about controversies and carriage disputes.

== Events ==
- February 4- ABC-5 goes on nationwide satellite broadcast, launches the slogan "The Fastest Growing Network".
- April 11- GMA becomes the first Philippine TV network to introduce an all-Filipino programming on primetime 7 days a week.
- May 21- ABS-CBN aired the Miss Universe pageant live from the PICC. Miss India Sushmita Sen made history as the first woman from India to win in the pageant. Prior to the coronation, the network was abuzz with pre-pageant activities that were also aired as a separate primetime TV special.
- May 28 - IBC-13 launches the slogan "Pinoy ang Dating".
- July 30 – Tito, Vic & Joey celebrated 15th Anniversary of Eat Bulaga!. The said anniversary also marked their last year on ABS-CBN.
- October 1 - New Vision 9 reverted to RPN and adopted the station tagline "RPN, The Network".

== Premieres ==
Date	Show
January 15	Game Na Game Na! on ABS-CBN 2
March 7	FBI: The Untold Stories on ABC 5
March 7	Rachel Gunn, R.N. on ABC 5
March 12	Tropang Trumpo on ABC 5
March 19	Sightings on ABC 5
April 3	Cobra on ABC 5
April 4	IBC Headliners on IBC 13
April 11	Betty and the Beast on GMA 7
April 11	D' Lookalayks in Puno't Bunga on GMA 7
April 15	Toynk! Hulog ng Langit on GMA 7
May 1	Highlander: The Series on ABC 5
May 7	Darkwing Duck on GMA 7
May 7	Goof Troop on GMA 7
May 7	Classic Disney shorts on GMA 7
May 16	Mixed N.U.T.S. (Numero Unong Terrific Show!) on GMA 7
June 6	ATBP: Awit, Titik at Bilang na Pambata on ABS-CBN 2
June 6	Ako... Babae on New Vision 9
June 6	Sine'skwela on ABS-CBN 2
July 2	Sailor Moon on ABC 5
July 3	Sky Ranger Gavan on ABC 5
July 16	Show & Tell on GMA 7
August 20	Mga Himala at Gintong Aral ni El Shaddai on IBC 13
September 7	Liberty Live with Joe Taruc on GMA 7
September 12	Bisperas ng Kasaysayan on New Vision 9
September 12	Your Evening with Pilita on New Vision 9
October 3	RPN NewsBreak on RPN 9
October 3	Hanggang Kailan Anna Luna?: Ikalawang Aklat on RPN 9
November 6	Talo na, Panalo Pa! on PTV 4
November 7	Villa Quintana on GMA 7
November 12	Citiline on ABS-CBN 2
November 14	Wake Up Call on RPN 9
November 14	La Traidora on RPN 9
November 14	Actually, Yun Na! on RPN 9
November 16	Superstar: Beyond Time on RPN 9

=== Unknown ===
- Remi: Nobody's Boy on ABS-CBN 2
- Bayan Ko, Sagot Ko on ABS-CBN 2
- Tatak Pilipino: Bagong Yugto on ABS-CBN 2
- Value Vision on ABS-CBN 2
- One on One on IBC 13
- Buhay Kartero on IBC 13
- Ating Alamin on IBC 13
- Mikee on GMA 7'
- The 700 Club Asia on GMA 7
- In Touch with Charles Stanley on GMA 7
- Sky Ranger Gavan on ABC 5
- WWE Raw on ABC 5
- Hard Hat on ABC 5
- Quantum Leap on ABC 5
- Stars on 5 on ABC 5
- Agri Link on ABC 5
- B na B: Baliw na Baliw on ABC 5
- Bodies and Motion on ABC 5
- Rock and Roll 2000 on ABC 5
- Value Vision on ABC 5
- Video Hot Tracks on ABC 5
- Blow by Blow on PTV 4
- For Kids Only on ABS-CBN 2
- Batong Buhay on GMA 7
- Angelito on GMA 7
- Gapo on RPN 9
- Miranova on RPN 9
- Chibugan Na! on RPN 9
- Barangay U.S.: Unang Sigaw on RPN 9
- D'on Po Sa Amin on RPN 9
- Ganito Kami Ngayon, O Ano Ha on RPN 9
- Newslight on RPN 9
- Beauty School Plus on RPN 9
- Actually, Yun Na! on RPN 9
- J2J on RPN 9
- The Doctor Is In on RPN 9
- Ikaw ang Mahal Ko on PTV 4
- Sportacular Asia on PTV 4
- Batibot on PTV 4
- Hutch The Honeybee on ABC 5
- Pollyanna on ABC 5
- Julio at Julia: Kambal ng Tadhana on ABS-CBN 2
- X-Men on ABS-CBN 2
- Wild C.A.T.s on ABS-CBN 2
- Back to the Future on ABC 5
- Conan the Adventurer on ABS-CBN 2
- Breezly and Sneezly on ABC 5
- The Ruff and Reddy Show on ABC 5
- Shelley Duvall's Bedtime Stories on ABC 5
- Solbrain on IBC 13

== Returning or renamed programs ==
Show	Last aired	Retitled as/Season/Notes	Channel	Return date
Your Evening with Pilita	1972 (ABS-CBN)	Same	New Vision 9	September 12
The Hour Updates	1994	RPN NewsBreak	RPN 9	October 3
Ating Alamin	1991 (PTV)	Same	IBC 13	Unknown

== Programs transferring networks ==
Date	Show	No. of seasons	Moved from	Moved to
September 12	Your Evening with Pilita	—N/a	ABS-CBN	New Vision 9
October 3	Anna Luna	—N/a	ABS-CBN	RPN 9 (retitled as Hanggang Kailan Anna Luna?: Ikalawang Aklat)
Unknown	Batibot	—N/a	ABS-CBN	PTV 4
Unknown	5 and Up	—N/a	ABC 5	GMA Network
Unknown	Ating Alamin	—N/a	PTV 4	IBC 13
Unknown	Sky Ranger Gavan	—N/a	PTV 4	ABC 5
Unknown	Remi: Nobody's Boy	—N/a	GMA Network	ABS-CBN
Unknown	Video Hot Tracks	—N/a	ABS-CBN	ABC

== Finales ==
- April 1: IBC NewsBreak on IBC 13
- April 27: The Hat Squad on ABC 5
- August 31: Straight from the Shoulder on GMA 7
- September 30:
  - Anna Luna on ABS-CBN 2
  - The Hour Updates on RPN 9
- November 24: Kate en Boogie on GMA 7

=== Unknown dates ===
- September: Straight from the Shoulder on GMA 7
- November: Viewpoint on GMA 7

=== Unknown ===
- The Global Update on ABC 5
- 17 Bernard Club on ABC 5
- Vina on ABC 5
- We R Family on ABC 5
- Tondominium on ABC 5
- Alabang Girls on ABC 5
- Late Night with Edu on ABC 5
- Rock and Roll 2000 on ABC 5
- The Edu Manzano Show on ABC 5
- Batibot on ABS-CBN 2
- Eh Kasi Bata! on ABS-CBN 2
- Bukang Liwayway on ABS-CBN 2
- Gillette World Sport Special on ABS-CBN 2
- Pollyanna on ABS-CBN 2
- Remi: Nobody's Boy on ABS-CBN 2
- One on One on IBC 13
- Heartwatch on IBC 13
- Buhay Kartero on IBC 13
- Pasikatan sa 13 on IBC 13
- Shaider on IBC 13
- Betty and the Beast on GMA 7
- Modern Romance Sa Telebisyon on GMA 7
- Rated PangBayan: Pugad Baboy sa TV on GMA 7
- NBC Nightly News on GMA 7
- The World Tomorrow on GMA 7
- It's A Date on RPN 9
- Mega Cinema Review on RPN 9
- Ako... Babae on RPN 9
- Gapo on RPN 9
- Tanglaw ng Buhay on RPN 9
- ATM: Anette, Tonyboy & Maria on RPN 9
- D'on Po Sa Amin on RPN 9
- Ganito Kami Ngayon, O Ano Ha on RPN 9
- Mommy Ko si Tita on RPN 9
- Wats UP sa Barangay on RPN 9
- Beauty School with Ricky Reyes on RPN 9
- The Doctor Is In on RPN 9
- Diwa ng Katotohanan on PTV 4
- Usapang Kongreso on PTV 4
- PTV Weekend Report on PTV 4
- Sky Ranger Gavan on PTV 4
- Hutch The Honeybee on ABC 5
- Pollyanna on ABC 5
- Julio at Julia: Kambal ng Tadhana on ABS-CBN 2
- Wild C.A.T.s on ABS-CBN 2
- Cobra on ABC 5
- Conan the Adventurer on ABS-CBN 2
- Shelley Duvall's Bedtime Stories on ABC 5
- Knots Landing on GMA 7
- The Wonder Years on GMA 7
- Winspector on IBC 13

== Channels ==
=== Launches ===
- October 6 - Cartoon Network (Southeast Asia)

== Births ==
- January 6 – MJ Cayabyab, actor and singer
- January 7 – Jessica Marasigan, dancer, beauty queen, TV host
- January 11 – Ritz Azul, actress
- March 23 - Patrick Sugui, actor and TV Host
- April 6
  - Jasmine Curtis-Smith, actress
  - Yesh Burce, actress
- April 16 – Angelica Jane Yap, actress and model
- April 27 – Elmo Magalona, actor and singer
- May 17 – Julie Anne San Jose, actress and singer
- June 13 – Hopia Legaspi, actress
- June 20 – Kyra Custodio, actress
- July 9 – Donnalyn Bartolome, actress and singer
- July 30 – Isabelle de Leon, actress and singer
- August 3 – Sarah Carlos, actress and courtside reporter of NCAA on ABS-CBN Sports and studied at San Beda College
- August 14 - Kim Rodriguez, actress
- August 16 - Tippy Dos Santos, actress and singer
- August 23 - Mark Neumann, actor
- September 22 - Avery Paraiso, actor and model
- October 31 - Jackque Gonzaga, dancer
- November 2 - Denise Barbacena, singer and actress
- November 20 - Kristofer Martin, actor
- November 26
  - Noven Belleza, singer
  - Yves Flores, actor
- December 7 – Myrtle Sarrosa, actress and former courtside reporter of National Collegiate Athletic Association on S+A
- December 14 – Joshua Dionisio, actor
- December 29 - Kristel Fulgar, actress

== Deaths ==
- September 5 – Louie Beltran (b. April 4, 1936), broadcast journalist and newspaper columnist

== See also ==
- 1994 in television
