= 1997 in Philippine television =

The following is a list of events affecting Philippine television in 1997. Events listed include television show debuts, finales, cancellations, and channel launches, closures and rebrandings, as well as information about controversies and carriage disputes.

== Premieres ==
Date	Show
January 7	Math-Tinik on ABS-CBN 2
January 17	Power Rangers Zeo on ABS-CBN 2
January 17	Big Bad Beetleborgs on GMA 7
January 19	Bitoy's Bilibkaba on GMA 7
January 20	TV Patrol Tuguegarao on ABS-CBN TV-3 Tuguegarao
January 20	TV Patrol Laoag on ABS-CBN TV-7 Laoag
January 20	TV Patrol Tacloban on ABS-CBN TV-2 Tacloban
February 1	The Slayers on ABS-CBN 2
February 2	SOP on GMA 7
February 8	Walang Tulugan with the Master Showman on GMA 7
February 17	Esperanza on ABS-CBN 2
March 10	Zenki on ABS-CBN 2
March 10	Pangarap Kong Jackpot on PTV 4
March 10	Mula sa Puso on ABS-CBN 2
March 16	Compañero y Compañera on ABS-CBN 2
March 17	Ikaw na Sana on GMA 7
March 31	Mga Munting Pangarap ni Romeo on ABS-CBN 2
March 31	Zorro on ABS-CBN 2
April 3	Si Tsong, Si Tsang on GMA 7
April 10	1 for 3 on GMA 7
May 11	Showbiz Lingo Plus on ABS-CBN 2
May 19	Kaya ni Mister, Kaya ni Misis on ABS-CBN 2
May 19	Good Morning Asia on GMA 7
June 2	Pira-pirasong Pangarap on GMA 7
June 2	Sky Dancers on GMA 7
June 2	Growing Up on GMA 7
June 2	Gillage People on GMA 7
June 16	TV Patrol Legazpi on ABS-CBN TV-4 Legazpi
June 22	Spice Boys on ABS-CBN 2
June 22	Wansapanataym on ABS-CBN 2
June 22	Onli in da Pilipins on ABS-CBN 2
June 24	!Oka Tokat on ABS-CBN 2
July 4	M.U. on GMA 7
July 6	Next on GMA 7
July 6	Bilibitornot on GMA 7
July 6	Vilma Tonight: A Limited Engagement on GMA 7
July 20	Rap 13 on IBC 13
August 18	Headline Trese (2nd incarnation) on IBC 13
September 5	Zeo Rangers on Studio 23
September 6	Zyurangers on ABC 5
September 15	Del Tierro on GMA 7
September 22	Thunder Jet on ABS-CBN 2
October 13	Si Manoy at si Mokong on GMA 7
October 13	Adventures of Tom Sawyer on ABS-CBN 2
October 14	Ibang Klase on GMA 7
November 3	CTN Midnite on IBC 13
November 23	Kaybol, Ang Bagong TV on ABS-CBN 2
November 24	Palawan TV Patrol on ABS-CBN TV-7 Palawan
December 22	B't X on ABS-CBN 2

=== Unknown ===
- Beverly Hills, 90210 on Studio 23
- Baywatch on Studio 23
- The Nanny on Studio 23
- The Final Report on PTV 4
- Philippines' Most Wanted on PTV 4
- Kassandra on ABS-CBN 2
- Klik na Klik sa Trese on IBC 13
- Details 0923 on IBC 13
- Sky Ranger Gavan on RPN 9
- Pobre Niña Rica on GMA 7
- Aawitan Kita on GMA 7
- Walang Kukurap on GMA 7
- Next on GMA 7
- Ang Dating Daan on RJTV 29
- Speed by MP Turbo on PTV 4
- Cinema Cinema Cinema on RPN 9
- Tell the People... Now on RPN 9
- Julie on ABS-CBN 2
- Sabado Jam on ABS-CBN TV-4 Davao
- Sabado Na Gyud on ABS-CBN TV-3 Cebu
- Zambo Jambo on ABS-CBN TV-3 Zamboanga
- TV Innovations on Citynet 27
- Ka Ina on Citynet 27
- TV Patrol Davao on ABS-CBN TV-4 Davao
- Rugrats on GMA 7
- Jetman on IBC 13
- Heidi on ABS-CBN 2
- The Three Musketeers on ABS-CBN 2
- Shaider on PTV 4
- Chicago Sons on ABC 5
- Clueless on ABC 5
- She-Ra: Princess of Power on ABC 5
- Star Trek: Deep Space Nine on ABC 5
- The Cosby Show on ABC 5
- Fiveman on RPN 9
- Zsa Zsa: A Limited Engagement on GMA 7

== Returning or renamed programs ==
Show	Last aired	Retitled as/Season/Notes	Channel	Return date
Philippine Basketball Association	1996 (season 22: "Governor's Cup")	Same (season 23: "All-Filipino Cup")	IBC	February 16
Philippine Basketball Association	1997 (season 23: "All-Filipino Cup")	Same (season 23: "Commissioner's Cup")	IBC	June 13
Vilma	1995	Vilma Tonight	GMA	July 6
Headline Trese	1992 (Islands TV 13)	Same (2nd incarnation)	IBC	August 18
Philippine Basketball Association	1997 (season 23: "Commissioner's Cup")	Same (season 23: "Governor's Cup")	IBC	September 20
Tell the People	1997	Tell the People... Now	RPN	Unknown

== Programs transferring networks ==
Date	Show	No. of seasons	Moved from	Moved to
Unknown	Ang Dating Daan	—N/a	IBC	RJTV
Unknown	Sky Ranger Gavan	—N/a	IBC	RPN
Unknown	Aawitan Kita	—N/a	RPN	GMA

== Finales ==
- January 3: Lyra on GMA 7
- January 26: GMA Supershow on GMA 7
- February 14: Mara Clara on ABS-CBN 2
- March 7:
  - Maria Mercedes on ABS-CBN 2
  - Ang TV on ABS-CBN 2
- March 9: Familia Zaragoza on ABS-CBN 2
- March 26: Teysi ng Tahanan on ABS-CBN 2
- April 3: Okay Ka, Fairy Ko! on GMA 7
- April 4: Business Today on GMA 7
- May 4: Showbiz Lingo on ABS-CBN 2
- May 9: Simplemente Maria on RPN 9
- May 12: The Maricel Drama Special on ABS-CBN 2
- May 29: GMA True Stories on GMA 7
- May 30: Mia Gracia on GMA 7
- June 15: The Sharon Cuneta Show on ABS-CBN 2
- June 17: Abangan ang Susunod Na Kabanata on ABS-CBN 2
- June 29: Super Games on GMA 7
- August 15: IBC TV X-Press on IBC 13
- September 12: Valiente on GMA 7
- October 6: Gillage People on GMA 7
- October 7: Mixed N.U.T.S. (Numero Unong Terrific Show!) on GMA 7
- October 31:
  - Gym Team on ABS-CBN 2
  - Headline Trese (2nd incarnation) on IBC 13
- November 16: Ready, Get Set, Go! on ABS-CBN 2

=== Unknown ===
- Pamilya Ukay-Ukay on ABS-CBN 2
- Carol En Cosme on ABS-CBN 2
- Ilusiones on ABS-CBN 2
- Lazos de Amor on ABS-CBN 2
- Beverly Hills, 90210 on ABS-CBN 2
- Baywatch on ABS-CBN 2
- The Nanny on ABS-CBN 2
- Spice Boys on ABS-CBN 2
- Earthlink on ABS-CBN 2
- Channel S on GMA 7
- Heartbeat on GMA 7
- Inside Showbiz on GMA 7
- Lihim ng Gabi on GMA 7
- Jamming on GMA 7
- Vilma Tonight: A Limited Engagement on GMA 7
- Bilibitornot on GMA 7
- MU on GMA 7
- Pobre niña rica on GMA 7
- MVP: Monday Viva Presentations on GMA 7
- B na B: Baliw na Baliw on ABC 5
- Good Evening Please on ABC 5
- Love Bytes on ABC 5
- Mga Gintong Aral ng El Shaddai on IBC 13
- Cinema Scoop on IBC 13
- Hollywood Nights on IBC 13
- PSE Live: The Stock Market Today on IBC 13
- Ikaw ang Humatol on IBC 13
- Ang Dating Daan on IBC 13
- Mga Himala at Gintong Aral ng El Shaddai on IBC 13
- Machineman on IBC 13
- Sky Ranger Gavan on IBC 13
- Fiveman on IBC 13
- Jetman on PTV 4
- Ang Pandayan ni Mang Pandoy on PTV 4
- Dakila Ka Pinoy! on PTV 4
- Aawitan Kita on RPN 9
- Cinema Cinema on RPN 9
- Nap Knock on RPN 9
- Tell the People on RPN 9
- Tell the People... Now on RPN 9
- Home TV Shopping on RJTV 29
- World TV Mag on World TV 21
- Dance Upon a Time with Becky Garcia on RJTV 29
- Quantum Showcase on Citynet 27
- TV Patrol Mindanao on ABS-CBN TV-4 Davao
- Hana Yori Dango on ABS-CBN 2
- Heidi on ABS-CBN 2
- Janperson on ABS-CBN 2
- All Star Professional Wrestling on ABC 5
- Frasier on ABC 5
- Free Willy on ABC 5
- Life Goes On on ABC 5
- She-Ra: Princess of Power on ABC 5
- Slam Dunk on ABC 5
- Star Trek: The Original Series on ABC 5
- The Fresh Prince of Bel-Air on GMA 7
- Solbrain on IBC 13

== Channels ==
=== Launches ===
- September 3 – Arirang TV
- September 21 – AXN Asia
- November 30 – Hallmark Channel Asia

== Births ==
- January 20 – Kim Michael Last, That's My Bae contestant
- January 27 - Angelica Nikka Javier, actor, dancer and TV Host
- February 15 – Kit Thompson, actor
- February 17 – Kenzo Gutierrez, actor, TV commercial, print and ramp model, football player and college student
- March 10 – Julia Barretto, actress
- March 13 – Lou Yanong
- March 30 – Johnrey Rivas, actor
- April 16 – Paul Salas, actor
- May 1 – Miles Ocampo, actress
- May 6 – Maymay Entrata, model, singer, composer, dancer and actress
- May 23 - Nikki Bagaporo, actress
- June 17 - Jameson Blake, actor, dancer and TV Host
- June 26 - Joshua Cadeliña, actor and singer
- June 20 - Edmond Francisco, actor, dancer and TV Host
- July 31 – Barbie Forteza, actress, singer, comedian and dancer
- September 16 – Julian Marcus Trono, actor
- September 22 – Maris Racal, actress, singer and dancer
- October 7
  - Joshua Garcia, actor
  - J. Rey Soul, singer (The Voice of the Philippines)
- October 4 – Michelle Vito, actress
- October 12 - Jimboy Martin, actor
- October 20 – Manolo Pedrosa, actor and student
- October 22 – Kiara Takahashi
- October 23 – Harlene Delgado, Broadcaster
- November 4 – Bea Binene, actress, broadcast journalist and TV Host
- November 17 - Jennifer Buencamino, actress, singer, dancer and TV Host
- December 4 – Ruru Madrid, actor
- December 7- Edward Kyle Secades, actor and dancer
- December 17 – Jazz Ocampo, actress
- December 18 – Mikee Quintos, actress and singer
- December 19 - Maria Fabiana, actress, TV Host & Model
- December 24 – Diana Mackey, actress

== Deaths ==
- April 6 – Max Alvarado, 68, actor (born 1929)
- July 3 – Chiquito, 65, actor and comedian (born 1932)
- October 11 – Dencio Padilla, 68, actor and comedian (born 1929)
- December 31 – Gerard Fainsan, 23, singer, actor and member Universal Motion Dancers (born 1974)

== See also ==
- 1997 in television
