= 1992 in Philippine television =

The following is a list of events effecting Philippine television in 1992. Events listed include television show debuts, finales, cancellations, and channel launches, closures and rebrandings, as well as information about controversies and carriage disputes.

== Events ==
- February 21 - ABC returns to air after a year of test broadcasts.
- April 30 – GMA Network Inc. launches the "Rainbow Satellite" branding, becoming the 3rd Philippine television network to go on nationwide satellite broadcast. The new Rainbow Station ID was also launched.
- May 25- Tito, Vic and Joey transferred their hit comedy show Television's Jesters (TVJ) from Islands TV-13 to ABC-5. Renamed as TVJ on 5, it only lasted one episode as IBC-13 management led by Gil Balaguer sued the trio for copyright infringement.
- May 30 - Southern Broadcasting Network's DWCP-TV WorldTV Channel 21, the country's first ever modern UHF television station, begins broadcasts. It is the first UHF channel to sign on following the 1991 shutdown of the television operations of the US military-operated Far East Network.
- October - Islands TV-13 was rebranded to Intercontinental Broadcasting Corporation (IBC) due to mismanagement by Islands Broadcast Corporation.

== Premieres ==
Date	Show
January 6	GMA Network News on GMA 7
January 6	Heartwatch on Islands TV 13 (now IBC 13)
January 11	Mana on ABS-CBN 2
January 18	Cooking with the Daza's on ABS-CBN 2
February 10	Valiente on ABS-CBN 2
February 17	Firing Line on GMA 7
February 21	Entertainment Today on ABC 5
February 21	Public Forum on ABC 5
February 22	Batman on ABC 5
February 22	P.O.P.S.: Pops On Primetime Saturday on ABC 5
February 22	Stay Awake on ABC 5
February 23	The Big Night on ABC 5
February 24	The Big News on ABC 5
February 24	Balitang Balita on ABC 5
February 24	Live on 5 on ABC 5
February 24	The COMELEC Hour on ABC 5
February 24	Bible Guide on ABC 5
February 24	Sine Klasiks on ABC 5
February 24	Criselda on ABC 5
February 24	ABC Mystery Theatre on ABC 5
February 24	48 Hours on ABC 5
February 24	Funhouse on ABC 5
February 24	Peaceable Kingdom on ABC 5
February 24	Small Wonder on ABC 5
February 24	Tiny Toon Adventures on ABC 5
February 24	The Three Stooges Animated Series on ABC 5
February 25	Gumby on ABC 5
February 25	ABC World Report on ABC 5
February 25	Alfred Hitchcock Presents on ABC 5
February 25	Tuesday Nine-Thirty on ABC 5
February 26	Family Rosary Crusade on ABC 5
February 26	Bill & Ted's Excellent Adventures on ABC 5
February 26	Tarzan on ABC 5
February 26	The Black Stallion on ABC 5
February 26	Quantum Leap on ABC 5
February 26	FBI: The Untold Stories on ABC 5
February 26	Charles in Charge on ABC 5
February 26	Adlibs with Cheche Lazaro on ABC 5
February 27	The Munsters Today on ABC 5
February 27	Nasty Boys on ABC 5
February 27	Midnight Caller on ABC 5
February 27	Entertainment Today on ABC 5
February 27	Trial by Jury on ABC 5
February 28	Police Academy on ABC 5
February 28	Sting 2 on ABC 5
February 28	The Big Story on ABC 5
February 29	Cine Suerte Presents on ABC 5
February 29	ABC Satellite News on ABC 5
February 29	Studio 5 Presents on ABC 5
February 29	ABC Global Update on ABC 5
March 1	Superman on ABC 5
March 1	The Last Frontier on ABC 5
March 1	Witness to Survival on ABC 5
March 1	Tales from the Darkside on ABC 5
March 2	Street Justice on New Vision 9
March 2	Island Son on New Vision 9
March 2	GMA's Best on GMA 7
March 3	ABCinema on ABC 5
March 6	America's Funniest Home Videos on New Vision 9
March 9	IBC NewsBreak on IBC 13
March 9	IBC News 5:30 Report on IBC 13
March 9	IBC News 11 O'Clock Report on IBC 13
March 13	World Entertainment Report on New Vision 9
May 4	Hoy Gising! on ABS-CBN 2
May 16	5 and Up on ABC 5
May 30	ABC World News Tonight on World TV 21
May 30	CNN World News on World TV 21
May 30	Lehrer NewsHour on World TV 21
July 18	Battle of the Brains on New Vision 9
August 16	Showbiz Lingo on ABS-CBN 2
August 16	Kapag May Katwiran, Ipaglaban Mo! on ABS-CBN 2
August 17	Mara Clara on ABS-CBN 2
September 6	Alab on ABS-CBN 2
September 14	Ober Da Bakod on GMA 7
September 15	Sonny Spoon on GMA 7
September 16	P.S. I Luv U on GMA 7
October 4	Gwapings Live! on GMA 7
October 19	Mr. Cupido on ABS-CBN 2
October 19	Japayuki: Luha at Tagumpay on ABS-CBN 2
October 19	Mga Lihim ng Ermita on ABS-CBN 2
October 19	Ang TV on ABS-CBN 2
December 7	Cedie, Ang Munting Prinsipe on ABS-CBN 2
December 23	Home Along Da Riles on ABS-CBN 2

=== Unknown ===
- 17 Bernard Club on ABC 5
- Alabang Girls on ABC 5
- Legal Forum on ABC 5
- Boyoyong on ABC 5
- Caloy's Angels on ABC 5
- Handog ni Brocka on ABC 5
- Idol si Pidol on ABC 5
- K-TV on ABC 5
- Late Night with Edu on ABC 5
- Learning your ABC on ABC 5
- Mga Yagit sa Lansangan on ABC 5
- Mr. DJ on ABC 5
- Showtime Funtime on ABC 5
- Starzan on ABC 5
- Straight to the Heart on ABC 5
- Sunday Mass on ABC on ABC 5
- The Chaplet of the Divine Mercy on ABC 5
- The Edu Manzano Show on ABC 5
- TVJ on 5 on ABC 5
- Viva Telekomiks on ABC 5
- Philippine Headline News on World TV 21
- World TV Mag on World TV 21
- Nora on ABS-CBN 2
- Gym Team on ABS-CBN 2
- International News Report on IBC 13
- OPS-PIA: Ugnayan sa Hotel Rembrandt on IBC 13
- Pasikatan sa 13 on IBC 13
- The Message on IBC 13
- P.Y. (Praise Youth) on IBC 13
- Silver Germs on GMA 7
- Teen Talk on GMA 7
- Agrisiete on GMA 7
- Billy Bilyonaryo on GMA 7
- Viva Sinerama on GMA 7
- Music Video Features on GMA 7
- De Buena Familia on New Vision 9
- Heart to Heart Talk on New Vision 9
- FVR Up Close on New Vision 9/PTV 4/IBC 13
- Just the 3 of Us on New Vision 9
- OPS-PIA: Ugnayan sa Hotel Rembrandt on New Vision 9/IBC 13
- The Police Hour on New Vision 9
- The Whimpols on New Vision 9
- Veggie, Meaty & Me on New Vision 9
- Job Network on PTV 4
- Kalikasan, Kaunlaran by Earth Institute Asia on PTV 4
- El Shaddai on IBC 13
- Machineman on IBC 13
- Shaider on IBC 13
- Candy Candy on IBC 13
- The Flying House on GMA 7
- Dragon Ball on New Vision 9
- Dog of Flanders: My Patrasche on ABS-CBN 2
- Sky Ranger Gavan on PTV 4
- The Cosby Show on PTV 4
- Toxic Crusaders on ABC 5
- Rachel Gunn, R.N. on ABC 5
- Blossom on GMA 7
- Under Cover on GMA 7

== Returning or renamed programs ==
Show	Last aired	Retitled as/Season/Notes	Channel	Return date
Philippine Basketball Association	1991 (season 17: "Third Conference")	Same (season 18: "First Conference")	PTV	February 9
Public Forum	1990 (IBC)	Same	ABC	February 21
The Big News	1972	Same	ABC	February 24
Philippine Basketball League	1992 (season 10: "Philippine Cup")	Same (season 10: "Maharlika Cup")	Islands TV 13 (now IBC)	April
TVJ: Television's Jesters	1992 (Islands TV 13)	TVJ on 5	ABC	May
Philippine Basketball Association	1992 (season 18: "First Conference")	Same (season 18: "All-Filipino Conference")	PTV	June 7
University Athletic Association of the Philippines	1992	Same (season 55)	New Vision 9	July 18
National Collegiate Athletic Association	1992	Same (season 68)	Islands TV 13 (now IBC)	August 1
Philippine Basketball Association	1992 (season 18: "All-Filipino Conference")	Same (season 18: "Third Conference")	PTV	September 20
Philippine Basketball League	1992 (Islands TV 13; season 10: "Maharlika Cup")	Same (season 10: "Invitational Cup")	IBC	October 24
National Basketball Association	1992	Same (1992–93 season)	GMA	November
Starzan	1991 (New Vision 9)	Same	ABC	Unknown

== Programs transferring networks ==
Date	Show	No. of seasons	Moved from	Moved to
February 21	Public Forum	—N/a	IBC	ABC
May	TVJ: Television's Jesters	—N/a	Islands TV 13 (now IBC)	ABC (as TVJ on 5)
August 16	Kapag May Katwiran, Ipaglaban Mo!	—N/a	Islands TV 13 (now IBC)	ABS-CBN
Unknown	Shaider	—N/a	ABS-CBN	IBC
Unknown	Candy Candy	—N/a	GMA	IBC
Unknown	Starzan	—N/a	New Vision 9	ABC

== Finales ==
- January 3:
  - GMA Headline News on GMA 7
  - Isabel, Sugo ng Birhen on ABS-CBN 2
- February 7: Agila on ABS-CBN 2
- March 6:
  - Islands Newsbreak on Island TV 13
  - Headline Trese on Islands TV 13
  - The 11 O'Clock News on Islands TV 13
- July 11: Uncle Bob's Lucky 7 Club on GMA 7
- July 26: Junior Patrol on ABS-CBN 2
- August 14:
  - Sebya, Mahal Kita on ABS-CBN 2
  - Kapag May Katwiran, Ipaglaban Mo! on Islands TV 13

=== Unknown ===
- Luv Ko si Kris on ABS-CBN 2
- Cooking It Up with Nora on ABS-CBN 2
- Star Smile Factory on ABS-CBN 2
- Cathedral of Praise with David Sumrall on ABS-CBN 2
- Classified Ads On Television on ABS-CBN 2
- Video Hit Parade on ABS-CBN 2
- Hotline sa Trese on IBC 13
- Usap-Usapan Live on IBC 13
- Magic Kamison on IBC 13
- TVJ: Television's Jesters on IBC 13
- Awitawanan on IBC 13
- Islands Gamemasters on IBC 13
- Eerie, Indiana on GMA 7
- Face to Face on GMA 7
- GMA Gems on GMA 7
- Silver Germs on GMA 7
- Murder, She Wrote on GMA 7
- Adlibs with Cheche Lazaro on ABC 5
- Caloy's Angels on ABC 5
- Handog ni Brocka on ABC 5
- Learning your ABC on ABC 5
- Mga Yagit sa Lansangan on ABC 5
- Mr. DJ on ABC 5
- Showtime Funtime on ABC 5
- Starzan on ABC 5
- Stay Awake on ABC 5
- TVJ on 5 on ABC 5
- Viva Telekomiks on ABC 5
- Cebu I, Cebu II on New Vision 9
- Manilyn Live! on IBC 13
- Bhoy on PTV 4
- Estudyante Blues on PTV 4
- Midnight Session on PTV 4
- Pangungusap ng Pangulo on PTV 4
- Pin Pin on PTV 4
- Sine Aksyon sa Kuatro on PTV 4
- Sine Huwebes sa Kuatro on PTV 4
- Viva Drama Specials on PTV 4
- Candy Candy on IBC 13
- The Real Ghostbusters on ABS-CBN 2
- The Flying House on GMA 7
- Alfred Hitchcock Presents on ABC 5
- Peaceable Kingdom on ABC 5
- Rachel Gunn, R.N. on ABC 5
- Amen on GMA 7
- Eerie, Indiana on GMA 7
- GMA Cartoon Carnival Presents on GMA 7
- Murder, She Wrote on GMA 7
- Saved by the Bell on GMA 7
- Under Cover on GMA 7
- Jiraiya on ABS-CBN 2

== Channels ==
=== Launches ===
- January 26 -
  - I Channel (now Metro Channel)
  - Sky Movies
- February 21: ABC (now TV5)
- May 17: EEC (now Aliw 23)
- May 30: World TV (now Solar Flix)
- October 1: CCTV-4

==== Unknown ====
- Intervision 68

=== Rebranded ===
The following is a list of television stations that have made or will make noteworthy network rebranded in 1990.

Date	Rebranded from	Rebranded to	Channel	Source
October 3	Islands TV 13	IBC (2nd incarnation)	13	

== Births ==
- January 2 – Alden Richards, actor and model
- March 30 – Enrique Gil, actor and dancer
- April 6 – Elora Españo, actress
- April 10 – Marion Aunor, singer and recording artist
- May 8 – Vickie Rushton
- May 9 – Jiro Manio, actor
- May 10 –
  - Jake Zyrus, singer and television personality
  - Zia Marquez, actress
- June 30 – Alfred Labatos, actor
- July 9 – Jake Vargas, actor and singer
- August 1 – Victor Silayan, actor
- August 28 – Max Collins, TV and film actress
- September 1 – Louise delos Reyes, actress
- September 9 – Frencheska Farr, singer, model and actress
- September 24 – Coleen Garcia, actress
- October 17 – Sam Concepcion, singer, dancer, actor, host and model
- November 22 – Yen Santos, actress
- December 3 – Jessy Mendiola, actress
- December 6 – Christian Bables, actor
- December 16 – Miho Nishida, Filipino-Japanese actress and model

== Deaths ==
- February 3 - Jay Ilagan
- February 9 - Apeng Daldal
- February 14 - Helen Vela
- March 22 - Joe Cantada

== See also ==
- 1992 in television
