= 1995 in Philippine television =

The following is a list of events affecting Philippine television in 1995. Events listed include television show debuts, finales, cancellations, and channel launches, closures and rebrandings, as well as information about controversies and carriage disputes.

== Events ==
- January 28: The noontime variety show Eat Bulaga! moved to GMA Network with a live broadcast from Araneta Coliseum.
- February 4–6: ABS-CBN launches "Primetime on Daytime", a noontime block that effectively launched the daily noontime show 'Sang Linggo nAPO Sila, the afternoon talk show Cristy Per Minute and the Sunday noontime show ASAP.
- June: GMA Network celebrates its 45th anniversary of broadcasts.
- July 30 – Tito, Vic & Joey celebrate 16th anniversary of Eat Bulaga!.
- August 27: The country's third UHF terrestrial TV station, GMA's Citynet Channel 27, is launched.

== Premieres ==
Date	Show
January 16	TV Patrol Zamboanga on ABS-CBN TV-3 Zamboanga
January 22	Berlin Break on ABC 5
January 28	Eat Bulaga! on GMA 7
January 30	Valiente on GMA 7
February 1	Inside Showbiz on GMA 7
February 2	Dong Puno Live on ABS-CBN 2
February 2	Okay Ka, Fairy Ko! on GMA 7
February 4	'Sang Linggo nAPO Sila on ABS-CBN 2
February 5	ASAP on ABS-CBN 2
February 5	Sunday Night Special on ABC 5
February 6	Cristy FerMinute on ABS-CBN 2
February 10	Mighty Morphin Power Rangers on ABS-CBN 2
March 6	Philippine Lottery Draw on PTV 4
March 23	Yaiba on ABC 5
April 1	Rainbow Cinema on GMA 7
April 18	Dragon Ball on RPN 9
May 1	TV Patrol Cagayan de Oro on ABS-CBN TV-2 Cagayan de Oro
May 17	Tapatan with Jay Sonza on GMA 7
May 20	Tattooed Teenage Alien Fighters from Beverly Hills on ABC 5
May 20	Turborangers on IBC 13
June 10	Hiraya Manawari on ABS-CBN 2
June 10	Bayani on ABS-CBN 2
June 12	TV Patrol Western Visayas on ABS-CBN TV-4 Bacolod
June 14	High Tide on ABC 5
June 27	Walker Texas Ranger on GMA 7
June 27	Batang X sa TV on ABC 5
July 1	Science Made Easy on PTV 4
July 1	Chemistry in Action on PTV 4
July 1	Physics in Everyday Life on PTV 4
July 9	Gameplan on GMA 7
July 10	IBC TV X-Press on IBC 13
July 31	Katok Mga Misis on GMA 7
July 31	Kadenang Kristal on GMA 7
August 3	Assignment on ABS-CBN 2
August 5	Powerline on IBC 13
August 12	T.G.I.S. on GMA 7
August 14	TV Patrol Dumaguete on ABS-CBN TV-12 Dumaguete
August 28	Citynet Noontime/Afternoon News on Citynet 27
September 2	Citynet Weekend News on Citynet 27
September 6	Law & Order on Citynet 27
September 14	Home Improvement on Citynet 27
September 14	Dave's World on Citynet 27
September 14	The Outer Limits on ABC 5
September 17	The Fresh Prince of Bel-Air on Citynet 27
September 30	Channel S on GMA 7
October 2	PTV News on PTV 4
October 2	Saksi: GMA Headline Balita on GMA 7
October 4	Emergency on GMA 7
October 8	Startalk on GMA 7
October 9	Batibot on GMA 7
October 20	Bubble Gang on GMA 7
November 3	The Joy of Music on ABS-CBN 2
November 4	Cooking with the Dazas on ABC 5
November 27	TV Patrol Baguio on ABS-CBN TV-3 Baguio
December 1	Calvento Files on ABS-CBN 2
December 23	Sailor Moon on ABC 5

=== Unknown ===
- Star Music Video on ABS-CBN 2
- Mighty Morphin Power Rangers on ABS-CBN 2
- Sounds Family on GMA 7
- Starla at ang mga Jewel Riders on GMA 7
- The Rev. Ernest Angley Hour on GMA 7
- PSE Live: The Stock Market Today on SBN 21
- Blossom on Citynet 27
- Nora Aunor Sunday Drama Special on ABC 5
- Better Home Ideas on ABC 5
- The Troika Tonite on ABC 5
- Jesus Miracle Crusade on PTV 4
- Liberty on TV on GMA 7
- Ang Pangarap Kong Jackpot on PTV 4
- Constel on PTV 4
- For God and Country on IBC 13
- Magandang Umaga Ba? on IBC 13
- TV Patrol Pagadian on ABS-CBN TV-9 Pagadian
- The Morning Show on ABS-CBN TV-4 Bacolod
- Batman: The Animated Series on ABS-CBN 2
- He-Man and the Masters of the Universe on ABC 5
- Slam Dunk on ABC 5
- VR Troopers on ABC 5
- Raijin-Oh on RPN 9
- Super Boink! on IBC 13
- Time Quest on IBC 13
- Ghost Fighter on IBC 13
- The Twisted Tales of Felix the Cat on ABC 5

== Programs transferring networks ==
Date	Show	No. of seasons	Moved from	Moved to
January 28	Eat Bulaga!	—N/a	ABS-CBN	GMA
January 29	Cathedral of Praise with David Sumrall	—N/a	ABS-CBN	GMA
January 30	Valiente	—N/a	ABS-CBN	GMA
February 2	Okay Ka, Fairy Ko!	—N/a	ABS-CBN	GMA
July	University Athletic Association of the Philippines	58	RPN	PTV
October 9	Batibot	—N/a	PTV	GMA
November 4	Cooking With the Dazas	—N/a	ABS-CBN	ABC
Unknown	Del Monte Kitchenomics	—N/a	ABS-CBN	GMA

== Finales ==
- January 25: Womanwatch on PTV 4
- January 26: Okay Ka, Fairy Ko! on ABS-CBN 2
- January 27:
  - Eat Bulaga! on ABS-CBN 2
  - Valiente on ABS-CBN 2
- January 29: Sa Linggo nAPO Sila on ABS-CBN 2
- February 3: Batman: The Animated Series on ABS-CBN 2
- March 25: FPJ sa GMA on GMA 7
- June 9: TV Patrol 4 on ABS-CBN TV-4 Bacolod
- June 30: SST: Salo-Salo Together on GMA 7
- July 6: Ryan Ryan Musikahan on ABS-CBN 2
- July 7:
  - IBC News 5:30 Report on IBC 13
  - IBC News 11 O'Clock Report on IBC 13
- July 13: Isang Tanong, Isang Sagot! on ABC 5
- July 27: Tatak Pilipino: Bagong Yugto on ABS-CBN 2
- September 23: Movie Magazine on GMA 7
- September 29:
  - Vilma on GMA 7
  - Hanggang Kailan, Anna Luna? (Ikalawang Aklat) on RPN 9
  - News on 4 on PTV 4
- October 1: Show & Tell on GMA 7
- October 6: Batibot on PTV 4
- October 13: Haybol Rambol on GMA 7

=== Unknown ===
- Mr. Cupido on ABS-CBN 2
- Eh Kasi Bata! on ABS-CBN 2
- Yan ang Bata on ABS-CBN 2
- Home Improvement on GMA 7
- R.S.V.P. on GMA 7
- Toynk (Hulog ng Langit) on GMA 7
- Profiles of Power on GMA 7
- Liberty Live with Joe Taruc on GMA 7
- Billy Bilyonaryo on GMA 7
- Modern Romance Sa Telebisyon on GMA 7
- Teen Talk on GMA 7
- Super Games on GMA 7
- Movie Patrol on GMA 7
- The Rev. Ernest Angley Hour on GMA 7
- Law & Order on GMA 7
- NBA Action on GMA 7
- NBA Inside Stuff on GMA 7
- Blossom on GMA 7
- Saturday Entertainment on GMA 7
- Idol si Pidol on ABC 5
- Mysteries 2000 on ABC 5
- Nap Knock on ABC 5
- Police Academy: The Series on ABC 5
- Windows with Johnny Revilla on PTV 4
- Smashing Action! on PTV 4
- Buddy En Sol on RPN 9
- Malayo Pa Ang Umaga on RPN 9
- Basta Barkada on RPN 9
- Movieparade on RPN 9
- It's A Date on RPN 9
- Pasikatan sa 9 on RPN 9
- Miranova on RPN 9
- Your Evening with Pilita on RPN 9
- For God and Country on IBC 13
- No Nonsense! on IBC 13
- Aiko Drama Special on IBC 13
- Maiba Naman with Didi Domingo on IBC 13
- All For Jesus Happenings on IBC 13
- Back to the Future on ABC 5
- Mr. Bogus on ABS-CBN 2
- Jetman on ABS-CBN 2
- X-Men on ABS-CBN 2
- Breezly and Sneezly on ABC 5
- Sky Ranger Gavan on ABC 5
- The Last Frontier on ABC 5
- Law & Order on GMA 7

== Channels ==
=== Launches ===
- August 27 - Citynet 27

==== Unknown ====
- DBS 11

=== Rebranded ===
- September 1 - Cartoon Network (Southeast Asia) → Cartoon Network (Philippines)

== Births ==
- January 5 -
  - Joyce Ching, actress
  - Lexi Fernandez, actress and singer
- February 20 - McCoy de Leon, actor, dancer and model
- February 28 - Kim Domingo, actress, TV commercial and model
- March 3 - Maine Mendoza, actress
- March 19 - Julia Montes, actress
- March 27 - Koreen Medina, actress and beauty queen
- April 25 - Arra San Agustin, actress
- April 26 - Daniel Padilla, actor and singer
- May 3 – Shaira Diaz, actress
- May 11 - Yassi Pressman, Hong Kong-Filipino actress and dancer
- May 18 - Tricia Santos, actress and athlete
- May 19 - Abel Estanislao, actor and model
- May 21 - Diego Loyzaga, actor
- May 23 - Eula Caballero, actress
- June 1 - Mariz Rañeses, Broadcaster (former actress and TV host)
- June 4:
  - Jerome Ponce, actor
  - Kiko Estrada, actor
- June 15 – David Licauco, actor
- June 20 – Katherine Loria, singer
- July 18 - Phytos Ramirez, actor, TV commercial and model
- July 29:
  - Jin Macapagal, actor, model, and dancer
  - Kiray Celis, actress
- August 1 - Derrick Monasterio, actor, dancer and singer
- August 7 – Tony Labrusca, actor
- August 18 – Jon Lucas, actor
- August 21 – Gil Cuerva, actor
- August 23 - Eliza Pineda, actress
- August 29 - Aria Clemente, actress and singer
- August 30 – Addy Raj, actor, singer, and model
- September 3 – AJ Raval, actress
- September 6 - John Manalo, actor
- September 15 - Rita Daniela, actress and singer
- September 23 - Felix Abalayan, actor, dancer and model
- September 24 – Gigi De Lana, singer
- October 13 - Melchor Gallaza, actor, dancer and TV host
- October 29 - Eumir Marcial, boxer
- October 30 - Chanel Morales, actress
- November 22 – Gab Lagman, actor and model
- November 26 - Michael Pangilinan, singer
- November 27 – Yohan Hwang, singer
- December 7 - Kamille Filoteo, actress

== Deaths ==
- March 8 - Ike Lozada, 54, comedian, actor, and TV host (b. 1940)
- June 11 - Rodel Naval, 42, singer, songwriter and actor (b. 1953)
- September 5 - Andy Poe, 52, actor (b. 1943)
- December 16 - Bert Marcelo, 59, actor and comedian (b. 1936)
- December 18 - Panchito Alba, 70, actor and comedian (b. 1925)
