= IBC Express Balita =

Defunct afternoon newscast and news bulletin of Intercontinental Broadcasting Corporation

- Also known as: IBC Express Balita (1998–2002; 2022–26); Express Balita (2002–11)
- Genre: News broadcasting (1998–2011); News bulletin (2022–26); Live action
- Created by: Intercontinental Broadcasting Corporation
- Presented by: Various contributors
- Country of origin: Philippines
- Original language: Tagalog

Production
- Production locations: IBC 13 Studios; Broadcast City, Quezon City, Metro Manila, Philippines (1998–2011); IBC News Studio, IBC 13 Compound, Capitol Hills Drive, Quezon City, Philippines (2022–26)
- Camera setup: Multiple-camera setup (as Afternoon newscasts; 1998–2011); Single-camera setup (as News bulletin; 2022–26)
- Running time: 30 minutes (1998–2002; 2004–11); 60 minutes (2002–04); 2-10 minutes (2022–26)
- Production company: IBC News and Public Affairs

Original release
- Network: IBC 13
- Release: July 13, 1998 – August 5, 2011
- Release: October 31, 2022 – February 13, 2026

IBC Express Balita (lit. 'IBC Express News') is a Philippine television news broadcasting show broadcast by IBC. Originally anchored by Anne Marie Soriano and Alice Noel, it aired as an afternoon newscast from July 13, 1998, to August 5, 2011, on the network's afternoon line-up replacing Headline Trese and was replaced by News Team 13: Afternoon Edition. The news bulletin was aired October 31, 2022 to February 13, 2026, replacing IBC Headliners and was replaced by Treze Express. Eve Valdez and Francis Riodeque served as final anchors.

Its reportorial teams are tasked to gather news from every major beat in the Greater Manila Area as well as nearby provinces.

== Airing history ==
=== As an afternoon newscast ===
The newscast premiered on July 13, 1998, a year after the cancellation of Headline Trese in 1997. It was first anchored by Anne Marie Soriano and Alice Noel. In July 5, 1999, Noel was replaced by Ida Marie Bernasconi as the newscast had several changes to the opening billboard. On February 21, 2000, returning media personality Snooky Serna joined Soriano as its new anchor, with a brand new opening billboard, graphics, soundtrack and stand-up news delivery.

On January 1, 2001, both Soriano and Serna were replaced by former teen star Precious Castelo and Malacañang correspondent Ron Gagalac as its new anchors maintaining the same title card, soundtrack, and graphics. On January 7, 2002, Noli Eala became Castelo's new co-anchor replacing Gagalac, which he transferred to ABS-CBN as a news reporter years later. By that time, the newscast expanded its broadcasting time to 60 minutes on Mondays, Tuesdays and Thursdays (as Wednesdays and Fridays paved way for the PBA on IBC coverage) and had several changes later on.

Several months later in the same year, Adrian Ayalin replaced Eala who left the newscast, as he moved to IBC News Tonight. On June 7, 2004, after IBC relaunched its slogan and station ID ("Ang Bagong Pilipino") on December 12, 2003, the newscast also done changes to its studios, opening billboard and graphics; and it also reused its first soundtrack theme of the newscast (which used from the latter's debut in 1998 to 2000) for follow-details before and after news reports. A year later, Ali Atienza replaced Ayalin, which he transferred to ABS-CBN as a news reporter. However, Atienza left the newscast in 2007 in order to run for mayor of Manila. He was temporarily replaced by Errol Dacame. In 2008, DZRH radio anchor Bing Formento became Castelo's new co-anchor replacing Atienza. The team-up continued until 2009 when Castelo decided to run for Councilor of Quezon City.

On November 9, 2009, Jake Morales replaced Castelo and Formento as its new anchor; the newscast relaunched to their graphics, soundtrack and opening billboard. For several weeks, Morales was joined by Toni Marcelo, and then, later on, Karen Padilla finally took the anchor's chair replacing the former. However, Padilla, being the wife of Erwin Tulfo, left the newscast in early 2011 to be acquired by TV5 to anchor for Aksyon Breaking on AksyonTV, leaving Morales as the sole anchor of the program, he was joined by Cathy Eigenmann as his new co-anchor on May 16, 2011.

On June 20, 2011, Chal Lontoc and Zyrene Parsad-Valencia took over the new and final anchors. The newscast ceased airing on August 5, 2011, to make way for the afternoon edition of News Team 13.

Title card used from November 9, 2009, until August 5, 2011.

=== As a news bulletin ===
On December 31, 2021, IBC announced through its Facebook page that IBC Express Balita will be relaunched as short news updates program airing every two hours every afternoon from Monday to Friday. The program premiered on January 1, 2022, and replaced the second iteration of IBC Headliners that lasted for a month in 2021.

On October 21, 2024, IBC Express Balita transitioned to an hourly news update format, broadcasting every weekday afternoon as part of the channel's programming changes. This format was further adjusted on December 31, 2024, with broadcasts airing several times in the afternoon and additionally in the evenings.

== Anchors ==
Main anchors (as News bulletin)

- Eve Valdez
- Francis Riodeque
- Greg Gregorio
- Princess Jordan (fill-in)

Former main anchors (as Afternoon newscast)

- Anne Marie Soriano (1998–2000)
- Alice Noel (1998–99)
- Ida Marie Bernasconi (1999–2000)
- Snooky Serna (2000)
- Precious Castelo (2001–09)
- Ron Gagalac (2001–02)
- Noli Eala (2002)
- Adrian Ayalin (2002–04)
- Ali Atienza (2004–07, 08)
- Errol Dacame (2007–08)
- Bing Formento (2008–09)
- Jake Morales (2009–11)
- Toni Marcelo (2009)
- Karen Padilla-Tulfo (2009–11)
- Cathy Eigenmann (2011)
- Chal Lontoc (2011)
- Zyrene Parsad-Valencia (2011)

Former substitute anchors (as Afternoon newscast)

- Karen Tayao-Cabrera (1998–2000)
- Nitz de Onon-Rosales (1998–2000)
- Ina Rubio (1998–2000)
- Chele Mendoza (1998–2000)
- Neil Santos III (1998–2000)
- Maricel Halili (2001–09)
- Jeffrey Zaide (2001–09)
- Jess Caduco (2008–09)
- Rida Reyes (2008)
- Florida Padilla (2003–07)
- Toff Rada (2009–10)
- Alvin Sejera (2009–11)
- Kara Cruz (2011)

Former anchors (as News bulletin)

- Jenny de Juan (2022)
- Patrick Lastra (2022–23)
- Zon Ballesteros (2022–24)
- Divina Dela Torre (2022–23)
- Mary Anne Tolentino (2022–24)
- Kurt Mustaza (2022–24)
- Divine Paguntalan (2023–24)
- Aly Luciano (2023–24)
- Krizel Insigne (2023–25)
- Jaybee Santiago (2023–24)
- Patricia Lopez (2023–24)
- Gabbie Natividad (2024)
- Ace Medrano (2024)
- Mondo Castro (2025)
- Julius Segovia (2025) (fill-in)

== See also ==
- List of Intercontinental Broadcasting Corporation original programming
