= Treze Express =

Philippine news bulletin of Intercontinental Broadcasting Corporation

- Genre: News broadcasting Live television
- Created by: Intercontinental Broadcasting Corporation
- Presented by: Various
- Country of origin: Philippines
- Original languages: Tagalog; English

Production
- Production locations: IBC Newsroom, IBC Compound, Capitol Hills Drive, Quezon City, Metro Manila, Philippines.
- Camera setup: Multiple-camera setup
- Running time: 2–3 minutes
- Production company: IBC News and Public Affairs

Original release
- Network: IBC
- Release: February 16, 2026 – present

Related
- Treze Mornings; Tutok Treze

Treze Express is a Philippine television news broadcasting show broadcast by IBC. It premiered on February 16, 2026, replacing IBC Express Balita.

The news program is part of the network's news division strategic rebranding to cater "Gen Z" and millennial audiences who tuned in both free TV and digital platforms.

== Anchors ==
Current

- Charles Villanueva (since 2026)
- Ace Medrano (since 2026)
- Ezrah Abad (since 2026)
- Rheena Villamor-Camara (since 2026)
- Gabrielle Lopez (since 2026)

Former

- Eve Valdez (2026)
- Francis Riodeque (2026)
- Greg Gregorio (2026)
- Gab Bayan (2026)
- Lubinie Heart ( 2026)

== See also ==
- List of Intercontinental Broadcasting Corporation original programming
