= Tutok Treze =

Early evening newscast of Intercontinental Broadcasting Corporation

- First title card of Tutok 13, used from 2019–21.
- Genre: News broadcasting Live television
- Created by: Intercontinental Broadcasting Corporation
- Presented by: Czarinah Lusuegro; Princess Jordan; Gab Bayan
- Opening theme: "To the Max" by Rick Rhodes†, Danny Pelfrey, and Mark Stephen Ross by Sound Ideas Canada (2019–24)
- Country of origin: Philippines
- Original language: Tagalog

Production
- Production locations: IBC Studio B, IBC Compound, Capitol Hills Drive, Quezon City, Metro Manila, Philippines.
- Camera setup: Multiple-camera setup
- Running time: 60 minutes
- Production company: IBC News and Public Affairs

Original release
- Network: IBC
- Release: February 25, 2019 – present

Related
- Treze Mornings; Treze Express

Tutok Treze (lit. Focus Thirteen (in Portuguese)) is a Philippine television news broadcasting show broadcast by IBC. It was premiered on February 25, 2019, coinciding with the network's relaunch, replacing News Team 13.

The 60-minutes early evening news program focuses on delivering the latest national news stories and specialized news packages and feature stories on health, sports, travel, business, science and technology, entertainment, lifestyle, culture and the lighter side of the news.

On April 13, 2026, the program rebranded and moved to a pre-evening timeslot as part of the network's news division strategic rebranding to cater "Gen Z" and millennial audiences who tuned in both free TV and digital platforms.

== Anchors ==
Current anchors

- Czarinah Lusuegro (since 2024)
- Princess Jordan (since 2022)
- Gab Bayan (since 2026)

Current segment presenters

- Sherween "Tita Chupeta" Eslava (Spotlight: since 2026)

Fill-in-anchors

- Greg Gregorio (since 2024)
- Ace Medrano (since 2024)
- Daniel Manalastas (since 2025)
- Eve Valdez (since 2026)
- Ezrah Abad (since 2026)

Former anchors

- Vincent Santos (2019–20)
- Miguel Dela Rosa (2019)
- Bryan Castillo (2020–22)
- Shawntel Nieto (2022)
- Erica Honrado (2022)
- CK David (2022)
- Gabbie Natividad (2024)
- Jhay Torres (2024)
- Dale De Vera (2024)
- Mondo Castro (2025)
- Julius Segovia (2024–25)
- Francis Riodeque (2025–26)

=== Reporters ===
- Jinky Baticados
- Princess Jordan
- Harley Valbuena
- Janina Magundayao
- Daniel Manalastas
- Earl Tobias
- Eugene Fernandez
- Juan Antonio
- Crystal Ramizares
- Alyssa Insigne
- Patrick Gupo
- Angelo Calixtro
- Ace Medrano
- Ezrah Abad
- Victor Llantino
- Bea Peniza
- Jake Miculob
- John Flores
- Ken Usita
- Mark Timbreza
- Rachel Beltran
- Dash San Pablo
- Christel Delfin
- Czai Chua
- Sophia Potenciano
- Bien Manalo
- Faith Santiago
- Symoun Ong
- Nomer Corporal
- Carms Magluoyan
- Jap Regala
- Camille Gonzales
- Kate Rena
- Rena Manubag-Dagoon
- Robert Nem
- Eleanor Defensor-Reyes
- Carol Panday
- Mela Lesmoras
- Mark Fetalco

== Segments ==
- Balitang Aprub - inspirational stories
- Balitang Probinsya - regional news
- Global News - foreign news in collaboration with international news outlets
- Gov on the Move
- Like It, Share It - trending and viral videos
- Magkano Nga Ba? - oil price monitoring
- Market and Peso Watch - Philippine Stock Exchange and foreign currency update
- PCSO Lottery Draw Update - PCSO lotto draw update straight from the PCSO's draw studio in Mandaluyong City
- Pinoy Internasyonal - reports on the Filipino community overseas
- Point of View - special features and useful tips
- Spotlight - showbiz news
- The Real Score - sports news
- Tutok Na... - top stories news
- Ulat Panahon - weather report

== Awards ==
- 2023 Lustre Awards, Most Outstanding News Program

== See also ==
- List of Intercontinental Broadcasting Corporation original programming
