= Treze Mornings =

Philippine morning show of Intercontinental Broadcasting Corporation

- Genre: Morning show
- Created by: Intercontinental Broadcasting Corporation
- Directed by: Mark Limchoa
- Opening theme: "Treze Mornings"
- Country of origin: Philippines
- Original language: Tagalog

Production
- Executive producers: Andres Bonifacio, Jr.
- Production locations: IBC Studio B, IBC Compound, Capitol Hills Drive, Quezon City, Metro Manila, Philippines.
- Camera setup: Multiple-camera setup
- Running time: 2 hours
- Production company: IBC News and Public Affairs

Original release
- Network: IBC
- Release: April 13, 2026 – present

Related
- Treze Express; Tutok Treze

Treze Mornings (lit. Thirteen (Note: From the Spanish loanword "trese", stylized.) Mornings) is a Philippine television news broadcasting and talk show broadcast by IBC, DWAN 1206 AM and DWAN TV. It premiered on April 13, 2026, replacing Bangon Bagong Pilipinas.

The 2 hour-long morning show consists of news, weather, traffic and market updates, light discussion and informative and special segments to begin the day. This is the state-owned TV network's first ever morning show and part of the network's news division strategic rebranding to cater "Gen Z" and millennial audiences who tuned in both free TV and digital platforms.

== Anchors ==
Current

- Daniel Manalastas
- Eve Valdez
- Alice Noel
- Armani Hector
- Atty. Marge Gutierrez
- Dr. Joseph Lee
- Master Hanz Cua
- Chef Jays Maulit
- Eugene Fernandez
- Rheena Villamor-Camara
- Charles Villanueva
- Doreen Suaybaguio
- Angela Sy
- Ana Nina Perea
- Angelo Calixtro
- Emil Cailing

Former

- Lubinie Heart

== Segments ==
- Treze News
  - Ronda Probinsya
  - Treze Voices Service
  - Boses ng Bayan
  - Global News
- Pinoy Internasyonal
- Good Vibes
- Attorney On Air
- News Brake
- Pet Spot
- Kusina Hacks
- Home Wais
- Weather Watch
- SRP Check
- Horroscope
- Sports Roundown
- The Red Carpet
- Kita Mo, Kita Ko?
- Fitness Zaya

== See also ==
- List of Intercontinental Broadcasting Corporation original programming
