= Ating Alamin =

Philippine television series

- Genre: Agriculture; Livelihood; Educational television
- Created by: Adolfo Geronimo
- Creative director: Gian Carlo Barsana
- Presented by: Gerry Geronimo
- Country of origin: Philippines
- Original language: Tagalog

Production
- Producers: Zenaida Geronimo; Miguel Geronimo; Rico Geronimo
- Cinematography: Angelo Caratao
- Running time: 50 minutes
- Production company: Gerry Geronimo Productions Inc.

Original release
- Network: MBS/PTV/NBN/PTV (1980–1991; 2009–2016); IBC (1994–2005; 2007–2009); TFC (2009–2020); ABC (2005–2007); UNTV (2010–2013)
- Release: October 5, 1980 – July 10, 2016

Ating Alamin (transl. Let Us Know) is a Philippine television infotainment show broadcast by MBS/PTV/NBN/PTV, ABC, IBC, TFC, and UNTV. Hosted by Gerry Geronimo, it aired from October 5, 1980 to July 10, 2016.

== History ==
The program was hosted, produced, written, and directed by Adolfo "Ka Gerry" Geronimo. It started as a radio program in April 1974 on DZFM, which aims to improve Filipino people's lives by sharing insights and innovations in agriculture, crops, fishery, livestock, and home industries. He pioneered agricultural programming on television, and later became a vehicle for him to be appointed as one of the sectoral representatives for the peasants during the 10th Congress of the Philippines as well as his participation in the 1992 and 1998 Senatorial elections.

It was later evolved as a television program, which premiered on October 15, 1980, on MBS Channel 4, and also traveled through different television stations through the years. The program was also aired internationally on ABS-CBN Sports and Action provided by TFC from 2009 to 2020.

The program, however, ended its run on Philippine television on July 10, 2016, after the program was suspended indefinitely on PTV Channel 4 by the Presidential Communications Operations Office under the leadership of then-PCOO Secretary Martin Andanar; which he focused PTV to become a News and Public Affairs channel. Despite this development, viewers can still catch up to the program through its YouTube channel for free.

== Final segments ==
- Talasaysayan sa Kabuhayan
- Dagdag Kaalaman
- Question and Answer
- Gabayan sa Kabuhayan
- Extension Service
- One-on-one: Kwentuhan ni Juan
- Special Feature

== Host ==
- Adolfo "Ka Gerry" Geronimo - (1980—1991; 1994—2016)

== Accolades ==
- Hall of Fame - Catholic Mass Media Awards
- Hall of Fame - KBP Golden Dove Awards
- Best Livelihood Program and Host - Gandingan Awards (2011)
- Seal of Approval - Anak TV Awards (2011)
- Recipient, Long-Running TV Shows - 16th PMPC Star Awards for Television (2002)
- Nominated - PMPC Star Awards for Television (1988–2016)
- Best Television Show (Top 1) - Gawad CCP para sa Telebisyon (1988)
