= List of programs broadcast by Intercontinental Broadcasting Corporation =

IBC is a Philippine free-to-air television and radio network. It is the flagship property of Intercontinental Broadcasting Corporation, a state broadcaster owned by the Government Communications Group under the Presidential Communications Office (PCO). It is headquartered on IBC Compound in Capitol Hills Drive, Diliman, Quezon City. The following is a list of all television and radio programming that IBC, CongressTV and DWAN 1206 AM is currently broadcasting since it began its television operations in 1960. Most of the programs are government media-produced, including from PTV and Presidential Communications Office, while fewer are independently produced.

== Current original programming ==
=== News ===
- 13 News (2025)
- Treze sa Tanghali (2025; simulcast on Congress TV)
- Treze Express (2026)
- Treze Mornings (2026)
- Tutok Treze (2019; simulcast on DWAN 1206 AM, DWAN TV and Radyo Budyong Panay)

=== Public affairs ===
- Bagong Pilipinas: PBBM Lingkod ng Bayan (2023)
- Chairman's Report with Dr. Dante "Klink" Ang II (2024)

=== Public service ===
- Dok True Ba? (2024)

=== Game show ===
- PCSO Lottery Draw (produced by Philippine Charity Sweepstakes Office and Digital8, Inc., 2024; simulcast on DWAN 1206 AM, DWAN TV and D8TV on BEAM)

=== Sports ===
- Masters of the Game (2026)

== See also ==
- Intercontinental Broadcasting Corporation
