= 1995 in Norwegian television =

This is a list of Norwegian television related events from 1995.

== Events ==
- 13 May - Norway wins the 40th Eurovision Song Contest in Dublin, Ireland. The winning song is the mostly instrumental piece, "Nocturne", performed by Secret Garden.

== Debuts ==
=== International ===
- (Australia) Heartbreak High (TVN)

== Television shows ==
=== 1990s ===
- Sesam Stasjon (1991-1999)

== Networks and services ==
=== Launches ===
Network	Type	Launch date	Notes	Source
ZTV Norway	Cable television	27 March		

== Deaths ==
Date	Name	Age	Cinematic Credibility
7 February	Odd Grythe	76	Norwegian journalist & radio & TV personality

== See also ==
- 1995 in Norway
