= 1995 in Scottish television =

This is a list of events in Scottish television from 1995.

== Events ==
=== January ===
- No events.

=== February ===
- No events.

=== March ===
- 26 March – Debut of the detective series Hamish Macbeth.

=== April to July ===
- No events.

=== August ===
- 27 August – Speaking at the Edinburgh Television Festival, Michael Mansfield, QC, one of Britain's leading barristers calls for television cameras to be admitted into English courts to help demystify the legal process and restore public confidence in it.

=== September ===
- No events.

=== October ===
- No events.

=== November ===
- No events.

=== December ===
- 28 December – Pilot episode of McCallum starring John Hannah. The programme is watched by over ten million viewers. It returns for a full series in 1997.

=== Unknown ===
- Gus Macdonald is appointed chairman of Scottish Television, while Andrew Flanagan is appointed chief executive.

== Debuts ==
=== BBC ===
- 26 March – Hamish Macbeth (1995–1997)
- 4 May – Monty the Dog who wears glasses (1995)

=== ITV ===
- 13 April – The Baldy Man (1995–1998)
- 5 June – The Caribou Kitchen (1995–1998)
- 28 December – McCallum (1995–1998)

== Television series ==
- Scotsport (1957–2008)
- Reporting Scotland (1968–1983; 1984–present)
- Top Club (1971–1998)
- Scotland Today (1972–2009)
- Sportscene (1975–present)
- The Beechgrove Garden (1978–present)
- Grampian Today (1980–2009)
- High Road (1980–2003)
- Taggart (1983–2010)
- Crossfire (1984–2004)
- Wheel of Fortune (1988–2001)
- Fun House (1989–1999)
- Win, Lose or Draw (1990–2004)
- Doctor Finlay (1993–1996)
- Machair (1993–1999)
- Speaking our Language (1993–1996)
- Wolf It (1993–1996)
- Hurricanes (1993–1997)
- Telefios (1993–2000)
- Only an Excuse? (1993–2020)

== Ending this year ==
- 10 February – The High Life (1994–1995)
- 29 April – What's Up Doc? (1992–1995)
- Unknown – The Tales of Para Handy (1994–1995)
- Unknown – The Magic House (1994–1995)

== Deaths ==
- 21 March – Robert Urquhart, 74, actor

== See also ==
- 1995 in Scotland
