= Si Tsong, Si Tsang =

Philippine television sitcom series

- Title card
- Genre: Silent; Sitcom
- Starring: Earl Ignacio; Susan Lozada
- Country of origin: Philippines
- Original language: Tagalog

Production
- Camera setup: Multiple-camera setup
- Running time: 30 minutes
- Production company: GMA Entertainment TV

Original release
- Network: GMA Network
- Release: April 3, 1997 – 1998

Si Tsong, Si Tsang (transl. Tsong, Tsang) is a Philippine television silent sitcom series broadcast by GMA Network. Starring Earl Ignacio and Susan Lozada, it premiered on April 3, 1997. The series concluded in 1998.

== Premise ==
Tsong, a professional job applicant, witnessed a crime on his way home. The villains see him, he runs away, crosses the street, dodges bullets, hurdles fences, take a deep breath, jumps into the river and realizes that he can't swim.

Miraculously, a mannequin floats by and 'rescues' him, and in gratitude Tsong brings the mannequin home. Until it is struck by lightning and so is born the naive Tsang.
