= 1992 in Portuguese television =

This is a list of Portuguese television related events from 1992.

== Events ==
- 6 October - Sociedade Independente de Comunicação, Portugal's first private television channel, begins transmission.

== Debuts ==
=== International ===
- (United Kingdom) / (United States) Where's Wally? (RTP1)

== Television shows ==
=== 1990s ===
- Roda da Sorte (1990-1994, 2008)

== Networks and services ==
=== Launches ===
Network	Type	Launch date	Notes	Source
SIC	Terrestrial television	6 October		
