= IBC Headliners =

Defunct evening newscast of Intercontinental Broadcasting Corporation

- Genre: News bulletin
- Country of origin: Philippines
- Original languages: English (1994-1998); Filipino (1994-2011)

Production
- Production locations: IBC 13 Studios, Broadcast City, Quezon City, Philippines (1994-2011); IBC News Studio, IBC 13 Compound, Capitol Hills Drive, Quezon City, Philippines (2021)
- Camera setup: Single-camera setup
- Running time: 1 to 3 minutes
- Production company: IBC News and Public Affairs

Original release
- Network: IBC 13
- Release: April 4, 1994 – August 5, 2011
- Release: October 25 – November 19, 2021

IBC Headliners is a Philippine television news broadcasting show broadcast by IBC. It aired from April 4, 1994, to August 5, 2011, replacing IBC NewsBreak and was replaced by IBC NewsBreak. The news bulletin returned from October 25, to November 19, 2021, replacing the second incarnation of IBC NewsBreak and was replaced by IBC Express Balita.

On October 24, 2021, IBC announced that the news program would resume airing on October 25, 2021. This edition only lasted for a month.

== Former anchors ==
Former anchors

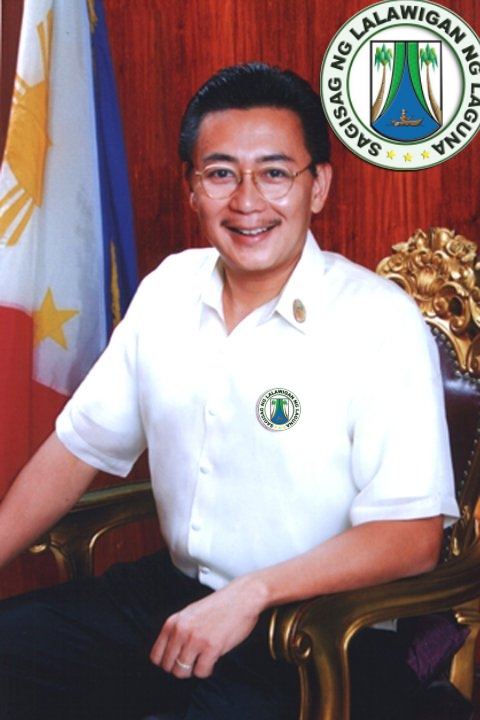
E.R. Ejercito

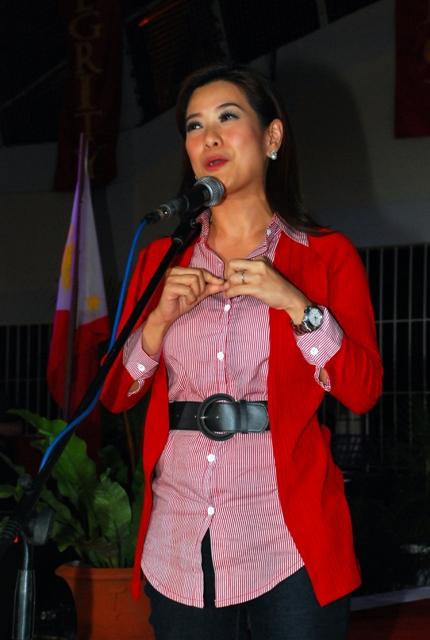
Bernadette Sembrano

- Roan Sumayao
- Kaye Langit-Luistro
- Ida Marie Bernasconi
- Karen Tayao-Cabrera
- E.R. Ejercito
- Maricel Halili
- Florida Padilla
- Alvin Sejera
- Atty. Aline Brosoto
- Adrian Ayalin
- Bernadette Sembrano
- Toff Rada
- Thea Gavino
- Abby Gonzales
- Julius Segovia
- Grace Choa
- Manuel Llige
- Neil Santos III
- Tintin Pizarro
- Alice Noel
- Jake Morales
- Jinky Baticados
- Jess Caduco
- Bryan Ellis Castillo (2021)
