= Tatak Pinoy Act =

Philippine law

Congress of the Philippines
- Long title: Tatak Pinoy (Proudly Filipino) Act
- Citation: Tatak Pinoy Act
- Territorial extent: Philippines
- Enacted by: Senate
- Signed: February 26, 2024
- Effective: March 15, 2024

Legislative history
- Bill title: Senate Bill No. 2426
- Introduced by: Sonny Angara
- Introduced: May 22, 2023
- First reading: May 22, 2023
- Second reading: September 26, 2023
- Third reading: November 6, 2023
- Committee report: Committee Report No. 107
- Status: In force

The Tatak Pinoy (Proudly Filipino) Act, designated as Republic Act No. 11981, is a Philippine law aimed at enhancing collaboration between the government and private sector. Authored by Senator Sonny Angara, the act was developed over nearly five years beginning in the 18th Congress through extensive consultations, studies, and research. It was signed into law by President Bongbong Marcos on February 26, 2024.

== Provisions ==
Under the Tatak Pinoy Act, industries in the Philippines are encouraged to produce high-value and sophisticated goods and services, enhancing their competitiveness both globally and domestically. This initiative aims to drive innovation and technology transfer, leading to faster economic growth and improved incomes for Filipinos, ultimately creating more opportunities within the country.

The Tatak Pinoy Act complements the goals set in the Philippine Development Plan by targeting specific industries and sectors with growth potential. A Tatak Pinoy Strategy will be developed, serving as a roadmap for national and local government agencies and the private sector to achieve the act's objectives.

== Tatak Pinoy Strategy ==
The Tatak Pinoy Law is central to the Philippines' industrialization strategy, revitalizing and advancing the economic agenda. This transformative legislation aims to promote industrial excellence, embrace innovation, and address contemporary challenges, enabling Philippine industries to compete effectively in the global market.

The law establishes a Tatak Pinoy Council responsible for developing and implementing a multi-year strategy focused on five key pillars: human resources, infrastructure, technology and innovation, investments, and sound financial management. This strategic approach supports industries in expanding and upgrading their operations, enhancing their competitiveness both globally and domestically.

Under the Tatak Pinoy Law, industries, both large and small, are encouraged to innovate and produce higher-value products that appeal to larger markets, ultimately leading to greater incomes and economic growth.
