= IBC TV X-Press =

- Genre: News program Live action
- Created by: Intercontinental Broadcasting Corporation
- Directed by: Jose Chito "Jet" Cabatuando
- Presented by: Amy Godinez-Cuenco; Elmer Mercado
- Country of origin: Philippines
- Original language: Filipino
- No. of episodes: n/a (airs Monday to Friday)

Production
- Production locations: IBC 13 Studios; Broadcast City, Quezon City
- Running time: 30 minutes
- Production company: IBC News and Public Affairs

Original release
- Network: IBC 13
- Release: July 10, 1995 – August 15, 1997

Related
- IBC News 5:30 Report; Headline Trese

IBC TV X-Press is a Philippine television news broadcasting show broadcast by IBC. Anchored by Amy Godinez-Cuenco and Elmer Mercado, it aired from July 10, 1995, to August 15, 1997, replacing IBC News 5:30 Report and was replaced by Headline Trese.

== Anchors ==
- Amy Godinez-Cuenco
- Elmer Mercado

== See also ==
- Intercontinental Broadcasting Corporation
