= Headline Trese =

- Genre: Newscast
- Created by: Intercontinental Broadcasting Corporation
- Directed by: Jose Chito "Jet" Cabatuando
- Presented by: Amy Godinez-Cuenco; Elmer Mercado; Karen Bayhon
- Country of origin: Philippines
- Original language: Filipino
- No. of episodes: n/a (airs Monday to Friday)

Production
- Production locations: IBC 13 Studios; Broadcast City, Quezon City
- Running time: 30 minutes
- Production company: IBC News and Public Affairs

Original release
- Network: IBC/Islands TV 13
- Release: November 27, 1989 – March 6, 1992
- Release: August 18 – October 31, 1997

Headline Trese is a Philippine television news broadcasting show broadcast by IBC/Islands TV 13. Originally anchored by TG Kintanar and Risa Hontiveros, it aired from November 27, 1989, to March 6, 1992, replacing Balita sa IBC Huling Ulat and Bantay Balita and was replaced by IBC News 5:30 Report and IBC News 11 O'Clock Report. The newscasts returned from August 18 to October 31, 1997, replacing IBC TV X-Press and was replaced by IBC Express Balita. Amy Godinez-Cuenco, Elmer Mercado and Karen Bayhon serves as the final anchors.

== Overview ==
Headline Trese aired late night news program from November 27, 1989 to September 28, 1990, later moved to late afternoon news program from October 1, 1990 to March 6, 1992. The newscasts returned as a late afternoon news program from August 18 to October 31, 1997.

== Anchors ==
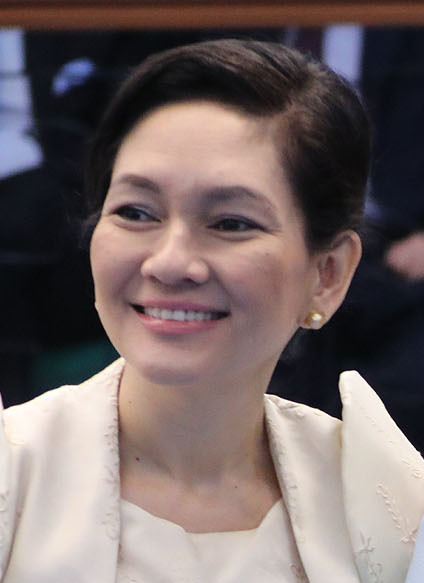
Risa Hontiveros served as an anchor.

- TG Kintanar (1989–90)
- Risa Hontiveros (1989–90)
- Lee Andres (1990–92)
- Vince Alingod (1990–92)
- Yna Feredo-Yulo (1990–92)
- Amy Godinez-Cuenco (1997)
- Elmer Mercado (1997)
- Karen Bayhon (1997)

== See also ==
- Intercontinental Broadcasting Corporation
