= IBC NewsBreak =

- Also known as: Islands NewsBreak (April 29, 1991–March 6, 1992)
- Genre: Newscast
- Starring: Various contributors
- Country of origin: Philippines
- Original languages: English (1992-1994); Filipino (1992-1994, 2014-2018)

Production
- Production locations: IBC 13 Studios; Broadcast City, Quezon City
- Running time: 2 to 4 minutes
- Production company: IBC News and Public Affairs

Original release
- Network: IBC 13
- Release: March 9, 1992 – April 1, 1994
- Release: October 27, 2014 – February 9, 2018

Related
- PTV Newsbreak; RPN NewsBreak

IBC NewsBreak was the hourly news bulletin of Intercontinental Broadcasting Corporation. Its first incarnation was from March 9, 1992, to April 1, 1994, replacing Islands NewsBreak and was replaced by IBC Headliners and it returned from October 27, 2014, to February 9, 2018, replacing IBC Headliners.

== Airing history ==
after Islands TV-13 reverted to IBC, airing from Monday to Sunday. After three years of hiatus, IBC revived its hourly news bulletin on October 27, 2014, using the original title. Initially, IBC Newsbreak airs only during the halftime and after PBA D-League broadcasts every Monday, Tuesday and Thursday at 9:00PM and 11:00PM, replacing the latenight edition of News Team 13 which was then-aired on Wednesday and Friday. A year later, IBC Newsbreak would become a permanent replacement to News Team 13 Latenight Edition and extends its broadcast from Monday to Friday.

== Anchors ==
=== Final anchors ===
- Vincent Santos
- Greg Gregorio
- Kathleen Forbes

=== Former anchors ===
- Jess Caduco
- Czarinah Lusuegro
