= Log Horizon season 2 =

Log Horizon
- Season 2
- Cover of the first Blu-ray volume released by NHK Enterprise in Japan on January 28, 2015 featuring Shiroe.
- No. of episodes: 25

Release
- Original network: NHK Educational TV
- Original release: October 4, 2014 – March 28, 2015

Season chronology
- ← Previous; Season 1 Next → Season 3

The second season of the Japanese science fiction action anime TV series Log Horizon premiered on NHK Educational TV October 4, 2014, and concluded on March 28, 2015, with a total of 25 episodes. The series is based on the novels written by Mamare Touno.

After finding themselves mysteriously trapped inside the Elder Tale game world, Shiroe and his fellow Adventurers have struggled for nearly six months to adjust to their new reality. During this time they managed to restore order to their city of Akihabara as well as defend the People of the Land from the goblin invasion at Zantleaf. However as winter approaches, Shiroe and his friends try to figure out their goals for the future and whether or not they should leave the safety of Akihabara in order to further explore the vast world of Elder Tale.

The series was produced by Studio Deen and directed by Shinji Ishihira, along with series composition by Toshizo Nemoto, character designs by Tetsuya Kumagai based on the original designs by Kazuhiro Hara, art direction by Masakazu Miyake, sound direction by Shoji Hata and soundtrack music by Yasuharu Takanashi. The series was picked up by Crunchyroll for online simulcast streaming in North America and other select parts of the world. The Anime Network later obtained the series for streaming. NHK Enterprise has released the series in Japan on eight Blu-ray and DVD volumes beginning on January 28, 2015, and in 2016, the season got an English DVD and Blu-ray release. The anime was licensed for a home video release by Sentai Filmworks in North America.

The opening theme is "database" by Man With A Mission ft. Takuma while the ending theme is "Wonderful Wonder World*" by Yun*chi. Eriko Matsui performs cover versions of Yun*chi's "Your song*" and "Wonderful Wonder World*" for the fifteenth, sixteenth, eighteenth and nineteenth episodes. Matsui also performs an original insert song for the twentieth episode titled, "Birthday Song". The songs were all performed as her character Isuzu.

== Episode list ==
No. overall	No. in season	Official English title (Note: All English titles are taken from Crunchyroll.) Original Japanese title	Original release date (Note: Log Horizon premiered in NHK Educational TV's Saturday 17:30 (05:30 pm JST) time slot.)	English air date	Ref.
26	1	"Shiroe of the Northern Lands" / "Shiroe of the Northern Nation"; Transliteration: "Kita no Kuni no Shiroe" (Japanese: 北の国のシロエ)	October 4, 2014	April 30, 2022	
The city of Akihabara (Note: Official English dubbed and subtitled versions of the series translate the word "Akiba" (アキバ) as "Akihabara".) holds a sports festival while the Round Table discuss their dire financial state since the high cost of maintaining the city has all but depleted their funds. Meanwhile Krusty, Isaac, Karashin and Ichimonjinosuke begin an offensive against the goblin camp at Seventh Fall. Due to Minami spies having infiltrated Akihabara, Shiroe later partly informs Log Horizon and the Crescent Moon Alliance of his intention to leave the city. Ten days later, Shiroe, Naotsugu and Regan meet with Kinjou of the Kunie Clan to discuss the terms of a financial agreement. However as Kinjou declines to assist the Round Table, Shiroe confirms the non-existence of the moneylender class, prompting him to reveal his intention of going straight to the source of the world's gold sealed away deep in the Depths of Palm. However before leaving, Kinjou presents Shiroe with the challenge of clearing a massive raid blocking the gold source to prove their worth to the Kunie Clan. Realizing that he cannot risk requesting combat support from the Round Table due to the spies monitoring their movements, Shiroe decides to enlist other acquaintances for help. Some time in the future, Shiroe and Akatsuki meet on the Moon after having both been killed during their respective missions.
27	2	"The Outlaw and Mithril Eyes"; Transliteration: "Muhōmono to Misuriru Aizu" (Japanese: 無法者とミスリルアイズ)	October 11, 2014	May 7, 2022	
Shiroe, Naotsugu and Regan arrive in Susukino where Shiroe intends to recruit William Massachusetts and the Silver Sword guild for the raid. William wastes no time in offering aid to Shiroe but notes the lack of man-power in his guild since many of his guild members retired from large-scale raids due to a phenomenon which occurs after a player dies. Meanwhile Naotsugu and Regan search around Susukino for other recruits and stumble upon a rather self-centered player named Tetra. At the same time, Demiquas barges into the Silver Sword guild seeking revenge against Shiroe but after William's threats and Tetra's ramblings, Demiquas stands down and William completes the necessary twenty-four player raiding party with them both. That evening the combined party of Log Horizon, Silver Sword and Brigandia members set off for the raid, with Shiroe using the opportunity to learn more about their party members. The following day, Akatsuki continues her mission by Shiroe to guard Lenessia and has a chance encounter with a stranger in Akihabara. Meanwhile the raiding party finally arrives at the gates to the lowest level of the Depths of Palm and Demiquas promises to use the opportunity to crush Shiroe's plans as part of his revenge.
28	3	"The Abyssal Shaft"; Transliteration: "Naraku no Sandō" (Japanese: 奈落の参道)	October 18, 2014	May 14, 2022	
The raiding party proceeds through the gates to the lowest level of the Depths of Palm and find themselves in a raid zone called "The Abyssal Shaft". Dividing themselves into four teams of six, the party battle their way through hordes of monsters to the first raid boss called Vendémiarie of the First Prison and find themselves vastly overpowered by its one-hit kills and debuffs, forcing them to retreat multiple times until finally defeating it through trial and error. After spending three weeks in the raid dungeon, and defeating two bosses, the party hits a major hurdle when they fail to encounter the other bosses in addition to running short on supplies. During a brief period of rest, William recalls the events which led him and his guild to settle in Susukino, and eventually laments dragging his guild members on large raids. At the same time, Demiquas' anger towards Shiroe further increases. As Shiroe wastes little time in planning the party's next move, Naotsugu explains to Tetra of the lengths Shiroe would be willing to go to protect his home in Akihabara. Back in Akihabara, as Christmas draws nearer, the Log Horizon members discuss the new "Teachings" skill which appeared after the Apocalypse. Meanwhile a malevolent figure threateningly watches over the city of Akihabara.
29	4	"Shattered Wings"; Transliteration: "Hibiware ta Tsubasa" (Japanese: ひび割れた翼)	October 25, 2014	May 21, 2022	
Maryelle, Henrietta, Serara, Riese and Mikakage join Akatsuki in the detail to protect Lenessia. Afterwards, Akatsuki ponders on her lack of strength while Henrietta and Riese notice her discomfort. The next day, Akatsuki observes other guilds during their training sessions in order to learn the secrets behind the Teachings skill in an attempt to strengthen herself. The other Log Horizon members also notice her discomfort but she keeps to herself and instead sinks into self pity due to her inadequacies. Meanwhile, Lenessia explains to Elissa about the persona she had been using to feign composure with the other girls. Elsewhere, Nyanta meets with Roderic about a special request from Shiroe. The next day, Akatsuki observes a sparring session by the Brigade of the West Wind before being noticed by Sojiro. That evening, while the girls take Lenessia out, the latter realizes that while she may not be able to understand who the Adventurers are, she does regard them as being special. Afterwards, Akatsuki leaves the group to ponder on her uselessness to Shiroe. Meanwhile, a malevolent figure called Enheart Nelreth approaches Kyouko of the Brigade of the West Wind in a back alley and murders her.
30	5	"Christmas Eve"; Transliteration: "Kurisumasu Ibu" (Japanese: クリスマス・イブ)	November 1, 2014	May 28, 2022	
Enheart Nelreth continues to wreak havoc in Akihabara and throws the city into a state of disquiet. This prompts the remaining Round Table members to impose an evacuation of the lower-levelled players to Zantleaf for their protection. Akatsuki later scours the city for Nelreth while Sojiro mobilizes his guild in the search. Meanwhile Kinjou meets with Lenessia and takes responsibility for the serial killings, done by a rogue Kunie clan member using stolen Royal Guard armor with capabilities exceeding an Adventurer. Akatsuki eavesdrops on the conversation and decides to take action after being inspired by Lenessia's strength. The Brigade of the West Wind later encounters Nelreth and Sojiro rushes to the scene to protect his guild members. Sojiro puts up a fierce duel against Nelreth along with Akatsuki when she makes a sudden appearance. However after allowing his guild members to flee, Sojiro activates his Teachings skill and tries to pass on some knowledge of it to Akatsuki mid-battle, before Nelreth cuts him down. At the same time, the raiding party encounters a particularly dangerous boss which kills Shiroe and Naotsugu. Finally, Akatsuki falls in battle against Nelreth and tearfully misses Shiroe before her body vanishes.
31	6	"A Lost Child at Dawn"; Transliteration: "Yoake no Mayoigo" (Japanese: 夜明けの迷い子)	November 8, 2014	June 4, 2022	
While waiting for Akatsuki to revive with Riese on Christmas Day, Lenessia realizes that she had not truly made an effort to understand the Adventurers around her and resolves to do so. Meanwhile Akatsuki has a vision of the other world and realizes that she had simply been moving forward with her life without any particular goal in mind. Afterwards she awakens in a tranquil beach landscape and encounters Shiroe while wandering around. The two share the circumstances which lead to their deaths and both trade fragments of their memories for the chance to revive. Afterwards Akatsuki revives at the Cathedral and begs Nazuna and Riese to share their Teachings with her to stop the murderer. Meanwhile, Roderic shares new information with his guild about playing as a different gender, the geological expansion of Yamato and the effect that item descriptions have in Elder Tale, concluding that the Apocalypse isn't over. Back at the Watermaple house, Riese and the other girls decide to aid Akatsuki after helping her realize that going alone was the wrong call. Elsewhere, while Krusty and Misa track the goblins at Zantleaf, Misa's weapon suddenly begins acting strangely and traps her in a type of barrier. However Krusty throws her out of the way only to find himself vaporized in her place.
32	7	"The Suifū Maidens" / "The Maidens of Watermaple"; Transliteration: "Suifū no Otome-tachi" (Japanese: 水楓の乙女たち)	November 15, 2014	June 11, 2022	
Riese learns of Krusty's disappearance at the hands of Misa's weapon and with him currently missing in action, Henrietta advises her to keep the information under wraps for the time being. Afterwards, Mikakage calls them to explain the worldly effects of item descriptions and Riese postulates the murderer's abilities from his Byakumaru sword's text. The next day, Nazuna puts together a group of players to begin training as part of Riese's plan to defeat the murderer, and has them share their Teachings with Akatsuki. Meanwhile, Henrietta and Riese meet with the Round Table to present all the information they have on the murderer and Riese proposes a plan involving a full raid inside Akihabara to counteract the threat on New Year's Eve. However in order for the plan to work, Riese and the others ask Lenessia to deactivate the city's magic circle, which would not only disable Nelreth's Royal Guard armor, but also disable the city's defenses—leaving her torn. With New Year's Eve drawing near, Akatsuki continues training but gets no closer to understanding the Teachings. At the same time, Lenessia decides to aid the girls in the upcoming raid. New Year's Eve finally arrives and when the full raid begins that evening, Maryelle and Akatsuki encounter a deranged Nelreth before Akatsuki engages.
33	8	"Akihabara Raid" / "Akiba Raid"; Transliteration: "Akiba Reido" (Japanese: アキバレイド)	November 22, 2014	June 18, 2022	
The Akihabara Raid begins and Akatsuki uses her new equipment provided by everyone in battle with Nelreth before fleeing with Maryelle to another section of the city. Following Riese's plan, they lead Nelreth through the city where he encounters groups of two-member raiding teams strategically placed to nullify his special abilities. Meanwhile, Lenessia and Kinjou reach an agreement to disable the city's magic circle. At the same time, Akatsuki pushes herself to her limits which causes her to activate her very own Teaching skill: Shadow Lurk. This gives her a slight edge until Nelreth decommissions her katana. However Tatara Amenoma gives her a new specially reforged katana with the power to challenge Nelreth's Byakumaru. Akatsuki then manages to lure Nelreth to Riese's position, where Lenessia and Kinjou simultaneously disable the city's magic circle and leave him vulnerable to Riese's ice attack which stops him from teleporting. Finally with the support of her comrades, Akatsuki destroys the Byakumaru, defeating Nelreth. In the aftermath, the Akihabara raiding party celebrates their victory and Shiroe calls Akatsuki to congratulate her while his raiding party prepares to once again face the boss which claimed their lives on Christmas Eve.
34	9	"The Changing Battlefield"; Transliteration: "Kawariyuku Senjō" (Japanese: 変わりゆく戦場)	November 29, 2014	June 25, 2022	
On Christmas Eve, the raiding party engages the boss called Luseat of the Seventh Garden in the Abyssal Shaft. During the battle, Luseat radically changes its attack patterns and unleashes devastating field attacks on the party. Shiroe quickly provides the most optimal course of action and the party manages to whittle down Luseat's health by fifty percent. However they fail to notice the gates open behind them and are left in a state of shock when two more bosses—Taltaulgar of the Fourth Garden and Ibrahabra of the Third Garden—enter Luseat's zone and begin laying waste to the battlefield. Facing insurmountable odds, the raiding party loses their resolve and are wiped out. Afterwards Shiroe has a vision of his younger self, prompting reflection on his neglect to form social bonds in the other world. He later brings this inadequacy to his new reality which manifested in his inability to fully trust his comrades. This resulted in him withholding his true purpose from the people around him. Accepting his flaws, he awakens on the Moon in the fourteenth server of Elder Tale called Mare Tranquillitatis. He eventually encounters Akatsuki wandering around and the two share the circumstances which lead to their deaths. Finally, they trade fragments of their memories for the chance to revive once more.
35	10	"Guild Master"; Transliteration: "Girudo Masutā" (Japanese: ギルドマスター)	December 6, 2014	July 2, 2022	
The raiding party revives after their overwhelming defeat on Christmas Eve and after listening to the disheartened words of his comrades, William struggles to raise their morale. This causes him to shed light on his social ineptitude in the other world and reveals the role Elder Tale had in helping him connect and empathize with like-minded people. Desperately appealing to his comrades, William mentions how truly happy they were after awakening in the very reality they had dedicated their lives to and uses this as affirmation for not quitting the raid. However when Demiquas objects to his logic, William exposes his deep regret at turning his back on the Round Table but idolized Shiroe for his perseverance in accomplishing the seemingly impossible raid which resulted in the restoration of Akihabara itself. Finally, William manages to inspire everyone when he explains that he accepted Shiroe's raiding request because at the heart of being a gamer, it was truly fun. William's heartfelt words also resonate with Shiroe so much that he wonders if he can also be the kind of guild master that inspires his guild members, and resolves to tell everyone his true purpose. Finally after a week of preparation, the raiding party moves to face the trio of bosses once more.
36	11	"Retry"; Transliteration: "Ritorai" (Japanese: リトライ)	December 13, 2014	July 9, 2022	
The raiding party charges into the boss zone and begins their assault on Luseat. With their teamwork bolstered by accepting who they are, the party manages to break through Luseat's initial mode. This temporarily immobilizes the boss and while a small group cleans up its Shadow Vanguard, the rest rush through the gates towards the other boss zones. Per Shiroe's new strategy, the party divides into groups to keep the bosses far enough away from each other to prevent their field attacks from overlapping. This allows them to better focus their attacks on Ibrahabra and Taltaulgar and gain a significant advantage. However when the Vanguard make a sudden appearance on the battlefield, Demiquas recklessly draws all the Vanguard towards himself, grabs Shiroe and lures them away from the main party further down the dungeon. After proceeding for a while, Demiquas stops and demands Shiroe to properly acknowledge him. With each finding new-found respect for the other, Shiroe acknowledges Demiquas before the latter throws him towards the Abyssal Shaft's goal and escapes with the Vanguard on his heels. Finally Shiroe proceeds through the doorway to the source of the world's gold and comes face to face with Kinjou and the raid's final boss—Uru of the Ninth Garden.
37	12	"The Gold of the Kunie" / "Kunie's Gold"; Transliteration: "Kunie no Ōgon" (Japanese: 供贄の黄金)	December 20, 2014	July 16, 2022	
A terrified Kinjou faces Shiroe while the raiding party vanquishes Ibrahabra and turns their full attention towards Taltaulgar. Meanwhile, Kinjou explains the closely guarded secret of how the system distributes gold to monsters. Shiroe then reveals his true goal of requiring funds to acquire all the purchasable land in Yamato, then reassigning their credentials over to the Yamato server itself in an attempt to balance the property market of the world, and in a measure of good faith—forfeits all of the Round Table's land assets. Afterwards, the raiding party celebrates their accomplishment after becoming the first to clear the Abyssal Shaft and Shiroe informs Akatsuki of his mission's success. In the aftermath, the party returns to Susukino and Shiroe brings Silver Sword up to speed on all of his experiences thus far and at the same time, feels deep regret for his mistreat of Demiquas. Afterwards, with Silver Sword opting to remain in and protect Susukino, Shiroe and his friends make their way back to Akihabara. Elsewhere, the members of Plant Hwyaden discuss the intelligence obtained from their surveillance of Akihabara and of Shiroe's return to the city. Finally, Shiroe, Naotsugu and newly accepted Log Horizon member, Tetra are warmly welcomed home by their friends.
38	13	"2.14 A Sweet Trap" / "2.14 Tender Trap"; Transliteration: "Ni-ten Ichi Yon Amai Wana" (Japanese: 2.14 甘いワナ)	December 27, 2014	July 23, 2022	
Valentine's Day arrives and the city of Akihabara once again gears up to mark the festivities. Meanwhile, Shiroe has a surprising reaction when Tetra teases him about his relationship with the former leader of the Debauchery Tea Party—Kanami. Afterwards Minori eavesdrops on Tetra as she gives Akatsuki useful information about the coconia fruit and its curious effect on a loved one if presented on Valentine's Day. Elsewhere, Shiroe and Isaac discuss the current state of Akihabara and the latter reports its peaceful nature, with the combat guilds taking shifts to maintain order despite the absence of the Royal Guard due to the city's deactivated magic circle. At the same time, Roderic and Ichimonjinosuke present Misa with a new prosthetic arm to replace the one she lost at Seventh Fall and they hypothesize that it may be in the same place where Krusty was taken too. As the day's events continue, Akatsuki and Minori bake a coconia cake for Shiroe. However when he eats the cake and comes under the fruit's influence, the girls find themselves unable to ask him who he prefers. Elsewhere, Indicus reinforces her control over Nureha with psychological abuse and reminds her of their contract to gain control of the Yamato server.
39	14	"Kanami, Go East!"; Transliteration: "Kanami, Gō! Īsuto!" (Japanese: カナミ、ゴー！イースト！)	January 10, 2015	July 30, 2022	
Plant Hwyaden overseers the launch of their Iron-Steel Train and former Debauchery Tea Party members—KR and Kazuhiko—discuss the travels of their former leader, Kanami. KR explains that he used a possession spell on a horse to explore the world in the hopes of gathering information after the Apocalypse, and stumbled upon Kanami and her party on the Chinese server. As they made their way eastwards to Japan, Kanami decides to intercept a horde of monsters heading towards a village much to the reluctance of the assassin Leonardo. However he eventually decides to aid the others and inspires KR to swap places with his horse and offer support. As Kanami and her other party members—Erius Hackblade and Copellia—engage the monsters, Leonardo and KR show up and separate the two sentient Genius monsters from their dragon. While Leonardo uses his speed to overwhelm the Lasphere monster, the Paps monster manages to stun Erius with the truth of his nature, however Kanami steps in and falsifies its claim. Back in the present, KR explains that he doesn't know the outcome of the battle since he died facing the dragon and revived in Minami. Finally, Plant Hwyaden launches their train to an unknown destination.
40	15	"A New Journey"; Transliteration: "Tabidachi" (Japanese: 旅立ち)	January 17, 2015	August 6, 2022	
Tohya, Rundelhaus Code, Serara and Nyanta return to the Log Horizon guild hall one night after watching a performance by Isuzu at a local restaurant and they give her high praise despite her modesty. Meanwhile, Shiroe and Maryelle discuss sending the junior members on their first independent journey to obtain materials for a special magic bag essential to an adventurer. Later that night, Tohya and Isuzu discuss the importance of having a talent or sport for oneself. Isuzu also explains that when she discovered a lute instrument in the Crescent Moon Alliance, it renewed her passion for music and helped her cope with their new reality after being rescued from Hamelin. The next day, the junior party excitedly prepare for their quest while their senior guild members naturally offer their advice and worry. After stocking up on weapons and item essentials, the entire Log Horizon guild have supper that night and the junior members decide to perform in the villages they pass along the way during their journey. Shiroe also suggests that they not make contact with the senior members for help as it would be a good opportunity for them to become independent. After covering all their bases and bidding their friends farewell, the junior party sets off on their journey the next day.
41	16	"The Midday Vampire"; Transliteration: "Mahiru no Kyūketsuki" (Japanese: 真昼の吸血鬼)	January 24, 2015	August 13, 2022	
While continuing their journey, the junior party takes the East Sea Road per Shiroe's suggestion as the fastest way to get to the Redstone Mountains. As they approach the next town, the party decides to further push their horse summonings until their time limit runs out, and are eventually left stranded on the roadside, forcing them to make camp. Meanwhile, Rieze describes her struggle to maintain D.D.D. in Krusty's absence and Log Horizon and the Crescent Moon Alliance pledge their aid should she require it. The following day, the junior party arrives at the town of Sazan and Rundelhaus secures them a free performance at a local inn in exchange for an overnight stay. The next day, Shiroe and Isaac discuss helping the Maihama knights get stronger and also of D.D.D.'s destabilization. At the same time, Honesty gets an influx of new parasitic members which causes Eins to contemplate drastic measures to ensure his guild's place in the Round Table. Meanwhile the junior party intercept some Landers being attacked by monsters and step in to help. While initially successful, they are ambushed by a swarm of powerful spirit monsters and vampiric player calling herself Roe 2 saves them in one fell swoop, before collapsing from overexposure to sunlight.
42	17	"Odyssey Knights"; Transliteration: "Odyusseia Kishidan" (Japanese: オデュッセイア騎士団)	January 31, 2015	August 20, 2022	
Nureha slips out of the Plant Hwyaden train and goes for a stroll as her Dariella persona. Meanwhile, the junior party escort the Landers to the next town and learn of a group called the Odyssey Knights that protect the Landers in the Boxurt Mountains from frequent monster attacks. In the next town, the party also learns that Roe 2 had set out on a journey to change her vampire sub-class and she offers to assist them with her own summonings. Elsewhere, Maryelle struggles to come up with a theme for the Spring event while Shiroe has Nyanta and Akatsuki conduct some surveillance on Maihama. Meanwhile, the Round Table begins discussing the emerging economic disparity between the citizens. Eins tries to assign blame and propose controversial countermeasures which the Table disagrees with and Shiroe reminds them of the danger to the city should they make decisions without citizen input. At the same time, the junior party makes their way through the Boxurt Mountains and end up assisting some stranded Landers when they encounter Dariella. Afterwards they watch as the ominous Odyssey Knights pass through the mountains with their mobile cathedral which Dariella explains helps adventurers revive anywhere, at the cost of losing a piece of themselves in the process.
43	18	"When the Concert Ends"; Transliteration: "Raibu ga Hanetara" (Japanese: ライブがはねたら)	February 7, 2015	August 27, 2022	
In the wake of Nureha's disappearance from the train, Loreil begins a frantic search for her. Meanwhile, Isuzu and the others explain to Roe 2 and Dariella of their quest goal. As their journey continues, the party makes a stop at the Town of Safil and hold a successful concert. After the concert, Isuzu has an exchange with Rundelhaus and talks about her musician father and they also shed some light on the translation errors that the system throws up between the different languages of the Landers and the adventurers. Rundelhaus also explains that the Landers only have forty-two songs given to them by God and were truly happy to hear Isuzu's music since they are unable to create their own. He goes on to elaborate upon the endless possibilities the adventurers create for them in Akihabara and causes Isuzu to break down from not heeding the advice of her lyrics. The next day, Tohya calls Dariella out on her odd personality and Shiroe notes the loss of contact from Nyanta. At the same time, Minori and Serara suspect the Odyssey Knight's mobile cathedral to be interfering with the telepathic network. Before they can confirm their suspicion though, they notice an incredible swarm of wyvern monsters making their way towards the town.
44	19	"The Red Night"; Transliteration: "Akaki Yoru" (Japanese: 赤き夜)	February 14, 2015	September 3, 2022	
With the threat of the wyverns bearing down on Safil, Nyanta decides to come out of the shadows and take action. Minori, Tohya and Serara decide to take the battle away from the town, however before they have a chance to do anything, the Odyssey Knights quickly engage the monsters. The trio then look on in horror as the battle-crazed knights manically charge at the wyverns in a state of disarray with their sole aim to be killed in battle after which they are revived by their mobile cathedral and repeat the process all over again. Meanwhile, Plant Hywaden activates their nightshade device and sends nightshade monsters into the chaos enveloping Safil. This prompts the Odyssey field commander to move the battle into the town and when Tohya questions his actions, he explains their theory that dying enough times may allow the adventurers to escape to the other world and chastises him for not doing the same. Listening to their exchange, Minori comes to the realization that like Tohya, she needs to keep pushing forward asks Roe 2 to aid them for however long that may be, and they enter the fray. Meanwhile, Nyanta begins a lone assault on the Plant Hwyaden train much to Londark's surprise.
45	20	"Birthday Song"; Transliteration: "Bāsudei Songu" (Japanese: バースデイ・ソング)	February 21, 2015	September 10, 2022	
Nyanta immediately clashes with Londark and learns that Plant Hywaden intends to trigger the war which Shiroe had once proposed as a possibility. Nyanta tries his best to reason with Londark and resonates with his understandable hatred towards having no control in his new reality. However Mizufa Trudy grotesquely silences him and proceeds to clash with an enraged Nyanta. After learning little more from Mizufa other than her warped world view, the fight eventually forces Nyanta to go for a death blow until Kazuhiko steps in. Meanwhile, after Tohya saw through her facade, Nureha decides to end the attack on Safil in some whimsical fantasy that she might receive Shiroe's approval. Back on the train, Nyanta deduces that Kazuhiko may have been somehow corrupted by Plant Hwayden despite being a double agent for the Round Table. Nyanta then presses his former Tea Party comrade for answers and Kazuhiko responds by throwing him off the train. As the battle of Safil wages on, the junior party do what they can to help and Isuzu has some self-reflection. Eventually, Isuzu and the others race back to Tohya, and when the Odyssey Knights' world view brings Isuzu to tears, she performs a song to highlight her hope for the world.
46	21	"The Skylarks Take Flight"; Transliteration: "Hibari-tachi no Habataki" (Japanese: ひばりたちの羽ばたき)	February 28, 2015	September 17, 2022	
Nyanta informs Shiroe of his recent encounter with Kazuhiko and of the wyvern attack on Safil which leaves the town in ruins. Dariella and Roe 2 then part ways with the junior party and the latter entrusts Minori with a letter for Shiroe. Afterwards, Tohya and the others decide to help the townsfolk with their repairs however Rundelhaus manages to convince them that they should leave the town. Back in Akihabara, Naotsugu begins to notice the return of the apathy phenomenon which had engulfed the adventurers at the start of the Apocalypse. Shiroe also begins pondering the factors which may drive the world into a war. Meanwhile, the Brigade of the West Wind encounter a strange Lander with a Genius title, seducing girls around the city. Back in Safil, Isuzu overhears some Landers voice their disappointment in their expectation of the Odyssey Knights, but feels a sense of fulfillment that she was able to briefly give them a new song. While leaving the town however, the junior party notice some Landers singing Isuzu's song which instils a new-found sense of hope in the world. Afterwards, Nyanta shows up and takes the party back to Akihabara and they celebrate the end of their quest with their seniors. Finally, Shiroe opens the letter from Roe 2.
47	22	"Stranger"; Transliteration: "Ihōjin" (Japanese: 異邦人)	March 7, 2015	September 24, 2022	
Shiroe sifts through the documents sent by Roe 2 and learns new information about the world. Afterwards he pays a visit to the Brigade of the West Wind and asks of their encounter with the Genius monster. The Round Table gather some time later and discuss additional encounters with three more Genius monsters around the city. Afterwards, Karashin brings Isaac up to speed with the Round Table's latest meeting. At the same time, Nyanta and Shiroe take note of the adventurers who have lost the resolve to continue. However thanks to Serara, Nyanta realizes that the younger adventurers can still be optimistic about their futures. The following night, Shiroe lays out his hypothesis about their current reality to the senior Log Horizon members, and reveals the information sent to him by Roe 2. Roe 2 explains that she is an artificial being created by an alien race that was sent to search other universes for a resource called "empathions". She then warns them of the Genius monsters who will obtain empathions at any cost. Finally, Shiroe decides to trust her words when she explains that her companions on the Moon may be able to assist the adventurers in returning to their own reality.
48	23	"Isaac and Iselus"; Transliteration: "Aizakku to Iserusu" (Japanese: アイザックとイセルス)	March 14, 2015	October 1, 2022	
Roderic informs Shiroe that a device to communicate with the Moon would cost an astronomical amount of funds to construct but he isn't sure whether it would actually work or not. Elsewhere Tohya and his party discuss whether or not they want to return to their own reality. Back in Maihama, Lord Sergiatte summons Isaac and explains that he intends to announce Iselus as the next heir to the Cowen throne and asks Isaac to continue to watching over him. Karashin later notes on the growing tensions between Westelande and Eastal. The next day, Maihama hosts a banquet for Prince Iselus and Sergiatte expresses his regret for making him bear the enormous responsibility of ruler. Though, with Isaac's support, Sergiatte presents Iselus as the heir to the throne of Maihama. A group of Westelande Landers then crash the event and attempt to assassinate Prince Iselus, however Isaac protects him with support from Karashin and Reserick. Regan later visits Shiroe to relay his latest findings and also notes that he detected a faint signal from the Shibuya broadcast building while investigating the transport gates. Suddenly, they receive word of people mysteriously collapsing all over Maihama and Akihabara while a mysterious black cloud showers the city of Akihabara with strange spores.
49	24	"Sleep of the Eternal Moth"; Transliteration: "Jōga no Nemuri" (Japanese: 常蛾の眠り)	March 21, 2015 (Note: Episode 24 premiered in NHK Educational TV's Saturday 18:25 (06:25 p.m. JST) time slot, due to the coverage of a local baseball sporting event on March 21, 2015.)	October 8, 2022	
At moonrise, the player cities of Akihabara, Susukino and Minami are all simultaneously attacked by swarms of Eternal Moth monsters, whose scales rain down and knock people into a state of sleep by draining their magic points. The Brigade of the West Wind soon discover the moths' nest in a new raid zone called "Calling Fortress" in the Shibuya broadcast building, and the Round Table postulate that the monsters had been drawn to the broadcasting antenna from the Moon. Filled with uncertainty, Shiroe decides to put together a raiding party and makes the difficult choice of destroying the antenna. The raiding party then fights their way through Shibuya and manage to enter the raid zone in the broadcast building. However Shiroe's uncertainty hinders his strategic insight and allows the sheer volume of monsters to overwhelm the party from all angles, forcing them to make a hasty retreat. Shiroe then apologizes to the party for his uncharacteristic lack of focus, but Minori and the others dispel his uncertainty about returning home when they collectively decide to stay and help the world of Elder Tale. Finally, when Ichimonjinosuke discovers the raid boss at the top of the building, Shiroe's restored resolve helps him formulate a new plan of attack.
50	25	"The Pioneers"; Transliteration: "Kaitakusha-tachi" (Japanese: 開拓者たち)	March 28, 2015	October 15, 2022	
The Shibuya raiding party begins another assault on the Calling Fortress and manage to break through to the roof where they encounter the raid boss, Taliktan, the Genius of Summoning. After failing to establish dialogue with the monster, it summons swarms of moths which engulf Shibuya and the other player cities. This puts a severe strain on the antenna and Shiroe has the party take the battle into the concert hall below. Despite inflicting a great amount of damage to Taliktan, they are still pummeled by its powerful field attacks. Shiroe raises the stakes with his Full-Control Encounter however, and gives the party a significant advantage in pushing Taliktan to the edge and ultimately, their victory. In the aftermath, Regan sets up the radio equipment and much everyone's surprise, Shiroe makes contact with Kanami in the Chinese server. She then tasks him with seeking a way to allow transit between the real and Elder Tale worlds and relieves the Shibuya party about Krusty's whereabouts. Meanwhile, Nureha and Plant Hwyaden decide to establish relations with Eastal and the Round Table to combat the common Genius threat. Finally, Log Horizon make plans to celebrate their victory and with the dawn of a new day, Shiroe and Akatsuki praise each other. In the epilogue, Log Horizon holds a victory party and Regan skips out on his task with repairing the radio equipment to join the festivities.

== Home media release ==
NHK Enterprise released the series in Japan on eight Blu-ray and DVD volumes between January 28 and August 26, 2015.

NHK Enterprise (Region 2 - Japan)
Vol.	Episodes	Blu-ray / DVD artwork	Bonus disc	BD / DVD Release date	BD Ref.	DVD Ref.
1	1, 2, 3, 4	Shiroe	—	January 28, 2015		
2	5, 6, 7	Tetra	—	February 25, 2015		
3	8, 9, 10	Akatsuki	Drama CD	March 25, 2015		
4	11, 12, 13	William Massachusetts	—	April 24, 2015		
5	14, 15, 16	Roe 2	—	May 27, 2015		
6	17, 18, 19	Isuzu	Drama CD	June 24, 2015		
7	20, 21, 22	Isaac	—	July 24, 2015		
8	23, 24, 25	Kanami	—	August 26, 2015		
