= Log Horizon season 1 =

Log Horizon
- Season 1
- Cover of the first Blu-ray volume released by NHK Enterprise in Japan on January 29, 2014 featuring Shiroe.
- No. of episodes: 25

Release
- Original network: NHK Educational TV
- Original release: October 5, 2013 – March 22, 2014

Season chronology
- Next → Season 2

The first season of the Japanese science fiction action anime TV series Log Horizon premiered on NHK Educational TV October 5, 2013, and concluded on March 22, 2014, with a total of 25 episodes.

Elder Tales, a massively multiplayer online role-playing game (MMORPG), has become a global success by its eleventh expansion pack, having a following of millions of players. During the release of its twelfth expansion pack— Novasphere Pioneers, thirty thousand Japanese gamers who are all logged on at the time of the update, suddenly find themselves transported inside the game world and donning their in-game avatars. In the midst of the event, a socially awkward gamer called Shiroe along with his friends Naotsugu and Akatsuki team up so that they may face this world which has now become their reality along with the challenges which lie ahead.

The anime was produced by Satelight Studios and directed by Shinji Ishihira, along with series composition by Toshizo Nemoto, character designs by Mariko Ito based on the original designs by Kazuhiro Hara, art direction by Yuki Nomura, sound direction by Shoji Hata and soundtrack music by Yasuharu Takanashi. The series was picked up by Crunchyroll for online simulcast streaming in North America and other select parts of the world. The Anime Network later obtained the series for streaming. Kadokawa Shoten released the series in Japan on eight Blu-ray and DVD volumes beginning on January 29, 2014. The anime was licensed for a home video release in 2014 by Sentai Filmworks in North America. Madman Entertainment later licensed the series for a 2015 release in Australia and New Zealand. This was followed by a license by MVM Entertainment for release in the United Kingdom. Funimation acquired the streaming rights after Sentai Filmworks lost them.

The opening theme is "database" by Man With A Mission ft. Takuma while the ending theme is "Your song*" by Yunchi.

== Episode list ==
No.	Official English titles (Note: The first English titles are taken from the Blu-ray and DVD releases by Sentai Filmworks. The second English titles are taken from Crunchyroll. If there is one English title, it is used by both.) Original Japanese title	Original release date (Note: Log Horizon premiered in NHK Educational TV's Saturday 17:30 (05:30 pm JST) time slot.)	English air date	Ref.
1	"The Apocalypse"; Transliteration: "Dai Saigai" (Japanese: 大災害)	October 5, 2013	October 23, 2021	
In medias res Shiroe, Naotsugu and Akatsuki find themselves ambushed by a pack of briar weasel monsters. Following a game update some time earlier, a confused Shiroe finds himself in the District of Akihabara inside the Elder Tales video game. Also donning his in-game character, he encounters other panicked players and all find themselves unable to log-out. Accessing his game menu, Shiroe quickly makes contact with his friend Naotsugu and later, the assassin—Akatsuki. The next day, the trio meet with Maryelle of the Crescent Moon Alliance guild learn that the teleportation gates across all the Japanese game districts have been taken offline in addition to the start of a widespread guild recruitment campaign to deal with the changes of the recent "Novasphere Pioneers" update. Afterwards Shiroe and co. discuss the possible outcomes of an in-game death and head into the Archive Tower Forests where they are ambushed by the pack of briar weasels. After some initial difficulty, they are able to overcome the ambush by physically moving their bodies to attack rather than relying on their preset attack commands. Elsewhere, a mysterious figure watches as a girl called Serara makes a panicked call to Maryelle while being chased by two players.
2	"The Roka Encounter Battle" / "The Battle of Loka"; Transliteration: "Roka no Sōgū-sen" (Japanese: ロカの遭遇戦)	October 12, 2013	October 30, 2021	
When a player revives at the cathedral, Shiroe deduces that the game doesn't end upon death. After another meeting with the Crescent Moon Alliance, Shiroe and co. learn of the recent rise in player killings in Akihabara. After a day of training, Shiroe and Naotsugu anticipate an ambush from nearby players and forces them into a direct confrontation. Overconfidence quickly becomes the undoing of the ambush party as Shiroe and Naotsugu's teamwork proves far too much and are quickly overpowered by the latter's high-level combinations. In desperation, the ambush leader tries calling in reinforcements only to discover they have been already taken down by Akatsuki. Feigning defeat, the leader tries to attack Shiroe until Akatsuki kills him. In the aftermath, Shiroe deduces that since people can survive in-game without actually doing anything, the string of killings were purely for entertainment purposes. Afterwards, Shiroe receives a call from Maryelle and learns that she intends to take a rescue party to retrieve Serara in the District of Susukino and asks Shiroe to take care of the guild in her absence. However Shiroe and his friends decide to go in Maryelle's stead.
3	"The Depths of Palm" / "Palm's Deep End"; Transliteration: "Parumu no Fukaki Basho" (Japanese: パルムの深き場所)	October 19, 2013	November 6, 2021	
While on their way to Susukino, Shiroe and co. surprise Maryelle at the tremendous progress they have made when they reach a dungeon known as the Depths of Palm. Meanwhile, Serara seems to be doing fine in the care of a cat-player called Nyanta after he saved her from her pursuers. While they wonder about the people Maryelle sent, the Brigandia guild continue looting and pillaging the district. Meanwhile, Maryelle begins a meeting with the smaller guilds of Akihabara, while another mysterious guild master learns of the recent events. Elsewhere, Shiroe and co. attempt to cross an ancient bridge in the dungeon which suddenly starts crumbling and sends Shiroe plummeting into the lake below. After recalling his time with the adventuring group, Debauchery Tea Party, Shiroe regains consciousness to find himself having been saved by his comrades. Eventually Shiroe and co. find themselves face to face with the dungeon's boss, a new Novasphere Pioneers creature. After emerging victorious, they arrive at the exit and are rewarded with a spectacular view of the sunset over the channel. Elsewhere, the guild master of Brigandia—Demiquas—issues a manhunt for Serara and Nyanta.
4	"Escape"; Transliteration: "Dasshutsu" (Japanese: 脱出)	October 26, 2013	November 13, 2021	
Finally arriving in Susukino, Shiroe and co. enter the district wary of an ambush by Brigandia. Shiroe meets up with Serara and Nyanta at a secret location, and discovers that his old friend Nyanta had been the one protecting Serara. Shiroe then devises a plan and prepares to leave the district. After having waited patiently for them to exit the district, Shiroe, Nyanta and Serara are surrounded by the Brigandia guild and Shiroe taunts Demiquas into a duel with Nyanta. Nyanta's swashbuckler sub-class inflicts severe status ailments on Demiquas, who crudely calls in his guild members for aid but Naotsugu quickly intercepts them. Both Naotsugu and Nyanta's health soon drop to dangerous levels and Shiroe has Serara heal them. With the healing having seemingly little effect, Naotsugu forces the Brigandia members to focus on him and buys enough delay time for Shiroe to ensnare Demiquas and allow Nyanta to defeat him. While taking down Brigandia's remaining healers Akatsuki marvels at their incredible teamwork, with Serara delivering the finishing blow to Demiquas to protect Shiroe. With their mission successful, Shiroe, Naotsugu and Nyanta summon three griffons and make their way back to Akihabara.
5	"Return to Akihabara" / "Return to Akiba"; Transliteration: "Akiba e no Kikan" (Japanese: アキバへの帰還)	November 2, 2013	November 20, 2021	
After successfully escaping from Susukino, Shiroe and co. take a break to set up camp. Nyanta uses the opportunity to brandish his cooking prowess by explaining that only those with the chef sub-class are able to manually prepare food with flavor. Afterwards, Nyanta, Shiroe and Naotsugu explain their history as part of the legendary adventuring group—Debauchery Tea Party, which causes Akatsuki to lament her own abilities. As their journey back to Akihabara continues, Shiroe reminisces about his time spent mentoring two beginners—Tohya and Minori, and recalls having glimpsed them joining a guild back in Akihabara. The next day, a sudden thunderstorm forces the party to seek shelter in a nearby farming village where they meet a Lander named Fedor. After interacting with Fedor and his grandchildren, Shiroe notes that the native inhabitants of the Elder Tales world have more human characteristics than given credit for and that the adventurers are in fact, the anomalies of the world. Elsewhere, Tohya and Minori along with other beginners find themselves taken advantage of by the guild who coaxed them into joining. Finally, as Tohya and the rest of his guild set out the next day, he happily notices Shiroe and co. safely back in Akihabara, but hesitates to meet him.
6	"Resolve"; Transliteration: "Ketsui" (Japanese: 決意)	November 9, 2013	November 27, 2021	
The Crescent Moon Alliance throws a party to commemorate Serara's return and decide to keep Nyanta's cooking methods a secret from the rest of the city. Afterwards Maryelle explains that an unnatural uneasiness befell the citizens during Shiroe's absence whereby a social divide was established between the strong and weak guilds. Maryelle also outlines that since the player level-limit was raised to 100 following the Novasphere Pioneers update, the guilds have been leveling up using items obtained from the Hamelin guild who had been recruiting low-level players for the sole purpose of creating a monopoly on their exclusive items. Following this news, Shiroe later ponders on all of his self-imposed limitations but Nyanta helps him realize that he had been using them as an excuse to purposefully blind himself from the reality of Akihabara's true state—despite his friends remaining by his side. Afterwards, Shiroe calls Minori and learns what he can of their situation before promising to save them. Filled with new resolve the next day, Shiroe asks the Crescent Moon Alliance to help in ending Hamelin's plot and restoring Akihabara's sense of goodwill with his newly formed guild—Log Horizon.
7	"Crescent Moon"; Transliteration: "Kuresento Mūn" (Japanese: クレセントムーン)	November 16, 2013	December 4, 2021	
Naotsugu, Shoryu and Hien begin hunting ingredient monsters while the rest of the Crescent Moon Alliance and Nyanta begin preparing for Shiroe's plan. At the same time Henrietta and Shiroe task Maryelle with approving an exorbitant budget for Shiroe's scheme which requires five million gold funding requests by taking advantage of the fact that Elder Tales has no strict ruling on how currency should be obtained. The following day, Crescent Moon Alliance opens a food booth and despite initial reluctance from the citizens, it becomes an instant hit with word of their flavorful food quickly spreading throughout the city. Afterwards, the stall manages to make over forty thousand gold in profit despite their sales being restricted by the total number of citizens living in Akihabara and the total number they can serve daily. Shiroe then leaves the next stage of his plan to Henrietta before he informs Minori of their progress and urges her to wait a while longer. That night, Shiroe and Nyanta request the aid of former Debauchery Tea Party member and master of the Brigade of the West Wind guild—Sojiro Theta, who happily offers help to his old friends. The next day Shiroe begins the second stage of his plan.
8	"Villain Behind Glasses" / "Devious Four-Eyes"; Transliteration: "Haraguro Megane" (Japanese: 腹ぐろ眼鏡)	November 23, 2013	December 11, 2021	
Maryelle and Henrietta meet with Karashin—master of the Shopping Street 8 guild to discuss a trade agreement for the second stage of Shiroe's plan. Karashin tries being coy in his attempt to establish an exclusive deal with the Crescent Moon Alliance's food business. Having already anticipated this, Shiroe has Maryelle and Henrietta introduce their intention of bringing in the masters of the other business venturing guilds—Michitaka and Roderic of the Marine Agency and Roderic Merchant Guild respectively. This forces Karashin to hurriedly accept the Alliance's proposition at a severely reduced price. Meanwhile, Minori laments all of the struggles she and Tohya faced when they became trapped within Elder Tales and that they didn't heed Shiroe's advice before it was too late, thus making them unworthy of his rescue. Back at the meeting, Shiroe has Henrietta bait the three guild masters into investing the remaining amount of gold under their pretense of an extremely profitable quest led by non other than the "Villain in Glasses" himself—Shiroe. Afterwards, Tohya relates similar feelings of undeserved rescue to Minori before the Crescent Moon Alliance and Log Horizon issue invitations to Akihabara's largest guilds for a conference to discuss the city's future.
9	"Round Table Conference" / "Round-Table Meeting"; Transliteration: "Entaku Kaigi" (Japanese: 円卓会議)	November 30, 2013	December 18, 2021	
The Round Table conference begins and Shiroe opens with his intention to improve the city's living state. This quickly prompts disinterest and departure from Silver Sword's guild master—William Massachusetts. Unperturbed, Shiroe continues his explanation of the conference's formation. Elsewhere, as the Hamelin captives prepare for escape, Shiroe mentions the item extortion campaign and Susukino's dire state, with Black Sword Knights' guild master—Isaac arguing the lack of laws in the world. D.D.D.'s guild master—Crusty asks of a guild's fate should they refuse laws, to which Shiroe proposes harsh sanctioning. However, Honesty's guild master—Eins along with Isaac and Crusty argue over the conference's flaw should they refuse to cooperate, with Isaac even threatening war. Shiroe then plays his trump card and reveals his acquisition of the Guild Building using the five million gold and counter blackmails the guilds over his absolute control of their affairs. Meanwhile, as the captives manage to escape the Hamelin Hall, Minori and Tohya are unfortunately captured by Schreider. However Shiroe's control of the Guild Building along with help from his friends, successfully blacklists all of Hamelin's members. Finally, as Shiroe makes one last pitch to the conference, Isaac demands his plan.
10	"Get It With Your Own Hands" / "Grab It In Your Hand"; Transliteration: "Sono-te ni Tsukamitore" (Japanese: その手につかみとれ)	December 7, 2013	January 8, 2022	
As the conference continues Maryelle reveals the secret behind preparing food with flavor followed by Michitaka's news of the collaborative invention of a steam engine. With these examples, Shiroe explains that by simply using one's own hands instead of the command menu, new things can be invented which in turn would create a demand for items and hence drive Akihabara's economy. Shiroe then proposes the establishment of laws that would ban the killing, kidnapping and imprisonment of players and also allow them the freedom to join and leave guilds as they desire—further suggesting that these laws also extend to the Landers much to the conference's surprise. However, with Maryelle's help, Shiroe convinces the conference of the People's importance and the dire need to coexist peacefully with them. Presented with an undeniable case, the guild masters unanimously decide on the Round Table's formation and move on to inform the city and mark the occasion with a celebration. A week later, Shiroe secures a headquarters for Log Horizon and welcomes Tohya and Minori as new members. At the same time, spies begin to infiltrate Akihabara and report back to Sergiatte Cowen of the League of Freedom Cities of Estal.
11	"The Invitation From Eastal" / "An Invitation From Eastal"; Transliteration: "Īsutaru Kara no Shōtaijō" (Japanese: イースタルからの招待状)	December 14, 2013	January 15, 2022	
Two Persons of the Land notice a strange phenomenon over the forest while hunting. Meanwhile, Naotsugu and Akatsuki take Tohya and Minori under their wing for training. As Shiroe begins experimenting with his scribe sub-class, Maryelle starts craving to visit the beach. This gives Shiroe the idea to hold a summer training camp for new players. Afterwards, emissaries of Sergiatte arrive in Akihabara and invite the Round Table to a meeting and ball. Having already anticipated this, Shiroe informs Crusty of the opportunity to learn more about the Landers and they set off the next month with Michitaka, Henrietta, Akatsuki and Misa Takayama. The training camp also set off for Choshi where they end up having fun at the beach. Maryelle and Minori also interact with more Persons of the Land as per Shiroe's suggestion. Elsewhere, the Round Table representatives arrive at The Palace of Eternal Ice and meet with Sergiatte during the ball. As Crusty and Sergiatte begin a discussion, Shiroe notes that both the adventurers and the Landers are wary of the other. Finally, as Princess Lenessia El-Arte Cowen graces the dance with her presence, Naotsugu informs the trainees that they will head into the Forest of Laglanda dungeon for group training the next day.
12	"The Forest of Lagranda" / "Lagranda Forest"; Transliteration: "Raguranda no Mori" (Japanese: ラグランダの杜)	December 21, 2013	January 22, 2022	
Sergiatte invites the Round Table representatives to participate in the dance, prompting Crusty to nominate Shiroe, and with help from Henrietta's bard sub-class, they quickly impress the entire ball. Afterwards, Minori informs Shiroe of their dungeon training and he reminds her of his lessons. The next day, Shiroe explains that the Landers would compete with themselves over dealings with the adventurers in order to obtain their fighting and technological power. He then proposes that they create rules to protect the Round Table when the People inevitably start approaching their guilds individually and hence has Akatsuki begin reconnaissance as preparation. Elsewhere, the training camp makes their way to the Forest of Laglanda and split up into groups, however Minori has trouble speaking her mind in a group with Tohya, Rundelhaus Code, Isuzu and Serara. Eventually the group encounters some monsters and familiarize themselves with their skills. Despite their best attempts however, they are quickly overpowered by the next wave of monsters and make a tactical retreat. Back at the Palace of Eternal Ice, Crusty introduces himself to Lenessia.
13	"Shield and Freedom" / "The Shield and Freedom"; Transliteration: "Tate to Jiyū" (Japanese: 盾と自由)	December 28, 2013	January 29, 2022	
The Round Table representatives soon find themselves invited to various meetings. At the same time, Elissa warns Lenessia to be wary of the adventurers and the latter recalls her meeting with Crusty where he uses her as a convenient shield against scrutiny from the palace folk. The next day, Lenessia happens upon a sparring session with the palace knights and Crusty craftily manipulates her into accompanying him to the evening party. Akatsuki also eavesdrops on two palace folk and learns of a group called the Izumo Knights. Afterwards, Crusty explains to Lenessia about the freedom the adventurers enjoy due to their resolve as opposed to her sheltered life. Elsewhere, the training group fails to seek what they lack and hence make little progress exploring the dungeon. Meanwhile Maryelle and Shoryu notice a strange phenomenon on the ocean horizon. At the same time, Lord Darte asks Michitaka to share sea faring technology with him. After Crusty and Lenessia attend the evening party, the former explains his interest in Lenessia by likening her to his real-world sister. Elsewhere, Shiroe meets with Akatsuki after a meeting and learns of the information she gathered. Just then, they are approached by a magician from Mirror Lake known as Regan.
14	"World Fraction" / "Universal Turbulence"; Transliteration: "Wārudo Furakushon" (Japanese: ワールドフラクション)	January 4, 2014	February 5, 2022	
Being an academic in the study of World-class magic, Regan offers Shiroe and Akatsuki an explanation of the World Fraction spell and its thrice use in the Elder Tales history, with Shiroe correctly deducing the third time being the Apocalypse. Regan explains that long ago the Human, Elf and Dwarf races destroyed the Alv kingdom out of technological envy. Seeking revenge, the remaining Alves cast the first World Fraction which resulted in the creation of the endlessly respawning demi-humans which subsequently pushed the planet into a world war. This caused humanity to create powerful hybrid races to aid in the war, until they were forced to cast the second World Fraction which summoned the adventurers to their aid. Regan also points out when Shiroe's name appeared in the world's history and he confirms the events using the game's rate of time as it correlates to the other world by taking into account the start of the game's open beta and when he began playing Elder Tales. Regan then moves on to explain his Spiritual Theory whereby memories in the form of experience points are lost during the revival process—a theory which Shiroe decides to withhold from the Round Table for the time being. Meanwhile, Minori finally decides to speak her mind to the training group.
15	"Attack"; Transliteration: "Shūgeki" (Japanese: 襲撃)	January 11, 2014	February 12, 2022	
Minori suggests that their group postpone entering the dungeon until they learn more about their respective skills. In doing so, they discover that their teamwork lacked cohesion. After Minori explains the basics of party combat, the group enters the dungeon the next day. Armed with their new knowledge, each person assumes a clearly defined role in the party and they finally overcome the battles they were forced to retreat from previously. Back at the Palace of Eternal Ice, Shiroe starts documenting all the information he learnt from Regan. While pondering on what to do next, he receives a call from Minori where she gives him the progress of their training and thrills him with the fact that her group finally realized the importance of teamwork and friendship. The next day, Crusty continues to meet with Lenessia while Minori, Serara and Isuzu discuss the latter's compatibility with Rundelhaus. However that night, as Rundelhaus and Isuzu have another exchange, Isuzu discovers that the system strangely prevents her from adding him to her friend list. The next day, the training camp at the beach come under a sudden attack by a massive army of amphibious monsters.
16	"Return of the Goblin King"; Transliteration: "Goburin ō no Kikan" (Japanese: ゴブリン王の帰還)	January 18, 2014	February 19, 2022	
The camp begins encountering other goblin monsters inland while Nyanta discovers a massive goblin army approaching from the north. Naotsugu informs Shiroe who organizes an emergency relay conference with the Round Table. Shiroe postulates that the recent attacks are part of a quest known as "Goblin King's Return". The adventurers then realize that in their neglect of quests from the People to defeat the goblins in favor of their development of Akihabara, they allowed the Goblin King to unite a great army. At the same time, Lenessia's father leaves to defend the town of Maihama from a goblin invasion. Afterwards, the training group discovers a goblin raiding force marching towards the nearby town of Choshi. Meanwhile Shiroe summons Sojiro and his guild to the Palace of Eternal Ice to aid in its defense should it come under attack. Shiroe then informs the Round Table representatives of his hypothesis that an in-game death induces memory loss, which Crusty verifies and reveals that he had already lost some memories of the other world. Elsewhere, the training group makes their way to Choshi but end up arriving too late. However, Minori realizes that the adventurers do not have to wait for the People to ask for their aid, and instead they should take the fight to the goblins themselves.
17	"A Lazy, Cowardly Princess"; Transliteration: "Taida de Okubyō na Himegimi" (Japanese: 怠惰で臆病な姫君)	January 25, 2014	February 26, 2022	
Minori manages to convince Naotsugu and Nyanta to let her group begin a surprise attack against the goblin forces. Meanwhile, the Estal Lords hold their own private conference to discuss Yamato's current predicament and possible battle strategies. Lenessia eventually overhears this information as well as their intention to use the adventurers. In the meantime, Shiroe prepares specific roles with Crusty and Michitaka for their talks with the Estal Lords until they are finally summoned. Having predicted that the Lords would try to gather more information from them, Shiroe uses the same tactic, prompting an outburst from Lord Kiliva stating that the adventurers have a responsibility to act. However, Michitaka violently retorts that they deserve more respect than what the League has shown them. At this time, Lenessia reluctantly makes a sudden appearance and notes the League's error in negotiating with the adventurers and instead proposes that she go to Akihabara to respectfully recruit volunteers to aid the People. Afterwards, as Minori's party continue fighting, Shiroe, Akatsuki, Crusty and Lenessia make their way to Akihabara and Shiroe remarks that Lenessia may be the one to change the cities of Estal.
18	"Expeditionary Force"; Transliteration: "Ensei Gun" (Japanese: 遠征軍)	February 1, 2014	March 5, 2022	
Upon arriving in Akihabara, Lenessia can't help but marvel at the different culture of the city. Shiroe and Crusty quickly organize a meeting which draws hundreds of adventurers. Wasting no time, Shiroe stirs the crowds with the threat the goblin army poses to Estal. After presenting the option that the adventurers do not have to act, Shiroe introduces Lenessia who makes a heartfelt plea for adventurers to aid her in defending Estal. Heeding Lenessia's words, the adventurers rally behind her with Crusty and Shiroe issuing the expedition to defeat the goblins as a quest from the Round Table. Crusty then takes almost half of the adventurers, along with Lenessia to the Narashino Port while Shiroe heads to the Midraunt Equestrian Park to set up a battle headquarters. In the meantime, Sergiatte meets with Michitaka and Henrietta to explain the developing rift between the League and the Cowen family thanks to Lenessia's actions and of the power difference between the People and the adventurers. However they decide to wait for a solution from Shiroe. Elsewhere, as Lenessia ponders on the consequences of her actions, the training group makes a stand against the goblins at Choshi. Finally, after Crusty and Misa divide the adventurers into raiding parties, Crusty issues them the single order: destroy all goblins.
19	"Chasing After Them"; Transliteration: "Ano Senaka o Oikake te" (Japanese: あの背中を追いかけて)	February 8, 2014	March 12, 2022	
Upon arriving on the battlefield, Crusty's group engages the goblin army at Kasumi Lake. Meanwhile, at the Midraunt headquarters, Shiroe explains the pivotal role Choshi plays in his plan to contain the goblin advancement. At the same time, a large army of monsters begin moving towards Choshi and the trainees persuade Maryelle to let them defend the town. While watching the trainees fight, Naotsugu and Nyanta comment on their battle styles and of Minori's attempt to imitate Shiroe's battle tactics. As the battle of Choshi wears on, Minori's group takes off to defend other parts of the town while Shiroe informs Maryelle of the arrival of reinforcements in another hour. With the battle taking a huge toll on them, Minori's group soon finds themselves slowly overpowered against a small group of monsters and she starts losing control of the battle. However Rundelhaus suddenly charges at the last two dire wolf monsters with his magical gauntlets in a suicide attack. In the aftermath, the party try in vain to revive him. Already knowing the inevitable though, Isuzu tearfully explains Rundelhaus' nature as a Lander who dies permanently. Refusing to give up, Minori quickly makes contact with Shiroe.
20	"Contract"; Transliteration: "Keiyaku" (Japanese: 契約)	February 15, 2014	March 19, 2022	
Shiroe immediately leaves for Choshi and using Regan's theories of revival, he has Minori, Serara and Isuzu alternate between restoring Rundelhaus' health and magic to prevent his body from being destroyed. Meanwhile, Misa and Lenessia update Crusty on the status of the battle and they prepare to intercept the goblin general's forces in Zantleaf. At the same time, Shiroe arrives at Minori and co.'s location and uses his enchanter abilities and a revival item to restore Roundelhaus' magic and temporarily revive him for a few minutes. Rundelhaus awakens and accepts his fate but Shiroe sharply rebuffs his resolve. Using the theory to bend the laws of the world by making things oneself, Shiroe presents Rundelhaus with a contract to join Log Horizon as an adventurer. Willing to use his abilities for the good of others, Rundelhaus signs the contract and dies as one of the Landers. Elsewhere, Crusty and the other adventurers mercilessly slaughter the goblin general and his forces at Zantleaf while Maryelle's group and the reinforcements repel the monsters invading Choshi. Afterwards Shiroe explains his definition of an adventurer to Minori. Finally, Rundelhaus awakens at the cathedral to his new status as an adventurer and gets a severe scolding from Isuzu for his recklessness.
21	"Waltz For Two" / "The Two of Us Shall Waltz"; Transliteration: "Futari de Warutsu o" (Japanese: ふたりでワルツを)	February 22, 2014	March 26, 2022	
A month following the battle at Zantleaf, Estal holds a grand ball for the adventurers in their victory against the goblin general, which Shiroe includes in his plan to eventually defeat the Goblin King. At the same time, Shiroe learns of an event called the Demon Festival of Suzaku Gate which occurred in the west of Yamato. While walking the Palace of Eternal Ice, Shiroe listens in surprise to a mysterious woman cryptically telling a group of children the story of how he saved Rundelhaus. Afterwards Shiroe visits Regan and learns that another adventurer in the district of Minami had also used world-class magic and that the Izumo Knights were involved in the Demon Festival. Back at the ball, while Crusty and Lenessia dance, the latter recalls a conversation with Sergiatte where he assigns her as the Estal ambassadress to Akihabara in order to repay the adventurers. Elsewhere, Shiroe thanks Akatsuki for her help in their previous trials with a dance. Sometime later, Lenessia moves to Akihabara to begin her ambassadorial duties and Shiroe spreads the information of the consequences of death as a rumor to suppress panic. As things return to normal in Akihabara, Maryelle proposes that they hold a festival to celebrate the autumn season which she calls the Scale Festival.
22	"The Swallow and The Baby Starling" / "Swallow and Young Starling"; Transliteration: "Tsubame to Hinamuku" (Japanese: つばめとひなむく)	March 1, 2014	April 2, 2022	
The city of Akihabara becomes much more lively as the Scale Festival looms over the horizon. While detached from the city's activities, Shiroe continues his research until Henrietta suggests that he take time away to enjoy the festival with everyone. Afterwards both Minori and Akatsuki attempt to invite Shiroe to a couple cake-eating contest. Minori explains to Isuzu that she intends to use the contest's reward to improve the public's trust of Shiroe which had been wavering as of late. The next day, Shiroe participates with both Akatsuki and Minori and the former receives a large amount of envy from the other participants for bringing two girls, which only escalates when Akatsuki and Minori begin competing with each other for his attention. However the trio end up failing the contest and while mulling over the day's events atop Log Horizon's headquarters, Shiroe decides to better utilize his time with his guildmates. Akatsuki then joins him and they have an awkwardly brief conversation where she shows her feelings for him despite Shiroe's obliviousness. At the same time, Minori catches them and runs away with a broken heart after admitting her feelings for Shiroe to herself. However with encouragement from Tohya, Minori realizes that she has no reason to be sad.
23	"The Apprentice Magician" / "Student of the Mage"; Transliteration: "Mahōtsukai no Deshi" (Japanese: 魔法使いの弟子)	March 8, 2014	April 9, 2022	
The second day of the Scale Festival gets underway and the members of Log Horizon go off on their own for the day's activities. Minori also stops off at Karashin's busy office to procure tickets for Lenessia's Twilight Banquet and offers her services. At the same time the city's inhabitants begin getting into squabbles with Lander merchants while Minori begins to use her apprentice sub-class to help Karashin account for the festival's finances. Elsewhere Nyanta peacefully kicks a rowdy Lander out of a restaurant and reports the matter to Shiroe. While the Black Sword Knights and D.D.D. guilds work on maintaining order during the festival, they resolve more disputes involving the Landers. Isaac and Crusty then discuss Shiroe's traits and agree that he works his best when doing so for the good of others. After putting a stop to yet another rowdy Lander, Shiroe finally notices the strangeness of the People's behavior and after Minori reports inconsistencies in the festival's paperwork all resulting from errors by the People, Shiroe confirms that the city may be under attack and makes haste for the Guild Building while disgruntled at his own carelessness. Meanwhile, a ship led by the sinister looking Lord Malves prepares to make contact with Akihabara.
24	"Confusion" / "Chaos"; Transliteration: "Konran" (Japanese: 混乱)	March 15, 2014	April 16, 2022	
Shiroe postulates that the Landers led by the newly arrived Lord Malves are responsible for the attack on the city, with the intention of destroying the Round Table's reputation and treaty with Estal. In preparation to counterattack, Shiroe has his comrades provide him with more information while Minori does her best to keep Karashin's office flowing using the skills taught to her by Shiroe. Afterwards Shiroe begins plotting all the points of disturbances caused by the Landers but has difficulty in discerning a pattern out of their random order until it finally dawns on him that the People are improvising on the spot. While stressed for a solution Shiroe gets a spark of genius after meeting Sojiro who had innocently beaten the cake contest with the help of his guild. In the meantime Lord Malves crashes the Twilight Banquet and corners Lenessia over his supposed mishandled cargo documents. Elsewhere, in a brilliant countermeasure, Shiroe uses the Brigade of the West Wind's infatuation with Sojiro as incentive for them to patrol the city and handle the disturbances. Shiroe and co. then learn of the banquet disturbance and decide to make the festival enjoyable as their true counterattack. Finally, Shiroe makes an appearance at Lenessia's banquet.
25	"The Scale Festival" / "The Libra Festival"; Transliteration: "Tenbin-Sai" (Japanese: 天秤祭)	March 22, 2014	April 23, 2022	
Shiroe, Crusty and Michitaka arrive at the banquet and easily counter Lord Malves' ruse with one of their own, forcing the latter to make a hasty retreat. Minori voices her concern over Shiroe's actions but he reassures her that he accepts appearing as the villain as long as he can accomplish his tasks, something which Akatsuki berates herself for being blind to. Some time later, Shiroe goes to meet with Ōshima—the contact he sent to Minami. However the strange storyteller from the Palace of Eternal Ice calling herself Dariella confronts him instead. Seeing through her disguise though, Shiroe forces the leader of Minami's lone guild—Nureha of Plant Hwyaden to reveal herself. Afterwards, each reveals the information they possess on the other's accomplishments, with Nureha also voicing her intention to recruit Shiroe. She then states her knowledge of Shiroe's research into finding a way back to the other world and bribes him with resources while prodding at his ambivalence towards Akihabara. However Shiroe rejects Nureha's proposal. Later, the Scale Festival enters its last stages and Log Horizon sit down to dinner and reassures Shiroe of their intention to help him however they can. Faced with new challenges, Shiroe issues Log Horizon their next goal of changing the world of Elder Tales. In the epilogue, Shiroe and Regan make plans to leave Akihabara.

== Home media release ==
Kadokawa Shoten released the series in Japan on eight Blu-ray and DVD volumes between January 29 and August 27, 2014. Sentai Filmworks released the complete series on two Blu-ray and DVD collections on November 25, 2014 and January 27, 2015. MVM Entertainment will follow with their own BD and DVD releases on April 13 and May 11, 2015 respectively. These releases contain both English and Japanese audio options and English subtitles.

Kadokawa Shoten (Region 2 - Japan)
Vol.	Episodes	Blu-ray / DVD artwork	Bonus disc	BD / DVD Release date	BD Ref.	DVD Ref.
1	1, 2, 3, 4	Shiroe	—	January 29, 2014		
2	5, 6, 7	Akatsuki	Drama CD	February 26, 2014		
3	8, 9, 10	Naotsugu	—	March 26, 2014		
4	11, 12, 13	Nyanta	Drama CD	April 25, 2014		
5	14, 15, 16	Minori	—	May 28, 2014		
6	17, 18, 19	Tohya	Drama CD	June 25, 2014		
7	20, 21, 22	Isuzu	—	July 30, 2014		
8	23, 24, 25	Rundelhaus Code	—	August 27, 2014		

Sentai Filmworks (Region 1 - North America)
Vol.	Episodes	Blu-ray / DVD artwork	BD / DVD Release date	BD Ref.	DVD Ref.
1	1–13	Akatsuki, Shiroe, Naotsugu, Lenessia & Crusty	November 25, 2014		
2	14–25	Isuzu, Rundelhaus Code, Minori, Tohya & Serara	January 27, 2015		

MVM Entertainment (Region 2 - United Kingdom)
Vol.	Episodes	Blu-ray / DVD artwork	BD / DVD Release date	BD Ref.	DVD Ref.
1	1–13	Akatsuki, Shiroe, Naotsugu, Lenessia & Crusty	April 13, 2015		
2	14–25	Isuzu, Rundelhaus Code, Minori, Tohya & Serara	May 11, 2015		
