= List of Log Horizon episodes =

Cover of the first home media release

Log Horizon is a 2013 science fiction, action Japanese anime series based on the novels written by Mamare Touno. A 25-episode anime adaptation produced by Satelight aired on NHK Educational TV from October 5, 2013, to March 22, 2014. The series was streamed as a simulcast by Crunchyroll in North America and other select parts of the world.

A 25-episode second season produced by Studio Deen aired from October 4, 2014, to March 28, 2015. Both seasons have been licensed by Sentai Filmworks in North America for digital and home video release.

A 12-episode third season titled Log Horizon: Destruction of the Round Table (Japanese:ログ・ホライズン 円卓崩壊, Hepburn: Rogu Horaizun Entaku Hōkai) has been released, originally set to premiere in October 2020, it was delayed to Winter 2021 due to the COVID-19 pandemic. The third season aired from January 13, 2021, to March 31, 2021. The third season is named after the title of Volume 12 of the web novel series and the official acronym is DORT. The staff and cast reprised their roles from the second season.

The English dub of the series began broadcasting on ABC Me in Australia on October 23, 2021.

== Series overview ==
Season	Episodes	Originally released	
Season	Episodes	First released	Last released
1	25	October 5, 2013	March 22, 2014
2	25	October 4, 2014	March 28, 2015
3	12	January 13, 2021	March 31, 2021

== Episode list ==
=== Season 1 (2013–14) ===
No.	Official English titles (Note: The first English titles are taken from the Blu-ray and DVD releases by Sentai Filmworks. The second English titles are taken from Crunchyroll. If there is one English title, it is used by both.) Original Japanese title	Original release date (Note: Log Horizon premiered in NHK Educational TV's Saturday 17:30 (05:30 pm JST) time slot.)	English air date	Ref.
1	"The Apocalypse"; Transliteration: "Dai Saigai" (Japanese: 大災害)	October 5, 2013	October 23, 2021	
2	"The Roka Encounter Battle" / "The Battle of Loka"; Transliteration: "Roka no Sōgū-sen" (Japanese: ロカの遭遇戦)	October 12, 2013	October 30, 2021	
3	"The Depths of Palm" / "Palm's Deep End"; Transliteration: "Parumu no Fukaki Basho" (Japanese: パルムの深き場所)	October 19, 2013	November 6, 2021	
4	"Escape"; Transliteration: "Dasshutsu" (Japanese: 脱出)	October 26, 2013	November 13, 2021	
5	"Return to Akihabara" / "Return to Akiba"; Transliteration: "Akiba e no Kikan" (Japanese: アキバへの帰還)	November 2, 2013	November 20, 2021	
6	"Resolve"; Transliteration: "Ketsui" (Japanese: 決意)	November 9, 2013	November 27, 2021	
7	"Crescent Moon"; Transliteration: "Kuresento Mūn" (Japanese: クレセントムーン)	November 16, 2013	December 4, 2021	
8	"Villain Behind Glasses" / "Devious Four-Eyes"; Transliteration: "Haraguro Megane" (Japanese: 腹ぐろ眼鏡)	November 23, 2013	December 11, 2021	
9	"Round Table Conference" / "Round-Table Meeting"; Transliteration: "Entaku Kaigi" (Japanese: 円卓会議)	November 30, 2013	December 18, 2021	
10	"Get It With Your Own Hands" / "Grab It In Your Hand"; Transliteration: "Sono-te ni Tsukamitore" (Japanese: その手につかみとれ)	December 7, 2013	January 8, 2022	
11	"The Invitation From Eastal" / "An Invitation From Eastal"; Transliteration: "Īsutaru Kara no Shōtaijō" (Japanese: イースタルからの招待状)	December 14, 2013	January 15, 2022	
12	"The Forest of Lagranda" / "Lagranda Forest"; Transliteration: "Raguranda no Mori" (Japanese: ラグランダの杜)	December 21, 2013	January 22, 2022	
13	"Shield and Freedom" / "The Shield and Freedom"; Transliteration: "Tate to Jiyū" (Japanese: 盾と自由)	December 28, 2013	January 29, 2022	
14	"World Fraction" / "Universal Turbulence"; Transliteration: "Wārudo Furakushon" (Japanese: ワールドフラクション)	January 4, 2014	February 5, 2022	
15	"Attack"; Transliteration: "Shūgeki" (Japanese: 襲撃)	January 11, 2014	February 12, 2022	
16	"Return of the Goblin King"; Transliteration: "Goburin ō no Kikan" (Japanese: ゴブリン王の帰還)	January 18, 2014	February 19, 2022	
17	"A Lazy, Cowardly Princess"; Transliteration: "Taida de Okubyō na Himegimi" (Japanese: 怠惰で臆病な姫君)	January 25, 2014	February 26, 2022	
18	"Expeditionary Force"; Transliteration: "Ensei Gun" (Japanese: 遠征軍)	February 1, 2014	March 5, 2022	
19	"Chasing After Them"; Transliteration: "Ano Senaka o Oikake te" (Japanese: あの背中を追いかけて)	February 8, 2014	March 12, 2022	
20	"Contract"; Transliteration: "Keiyaku" (Japanese: 契約)	February 15, 2014	March 19, 2022	
21	"Waltz For Two" / "The Two of Us Shall Waltz"; Transliteration: "Futari de Warutsu o" (Japanese: ふたりでワルツを)	February 22, 2014	March 26, 2022	
22	"The Swallow and The Baby Starling" / "Swallow and Young Starling"; Transliteration: "Tsubame to Hinamuku" (Japanese: つばめとひなむく)	March 1, 2014	April 2, 2022	
23	"The Apprentice Magician" / "Student of the Mage"; Transliteration: "Mahōtsukai no Deshi" (Japanese: 魔法使いの弟子)	March 8, 2014	April 9, 2022	
24	"Confusion" / "Chaos"; Transliteration: "Konran" (Japanese: 混乱)	March 15, 2014	April 16, 2022	
25	"The Scale Festival" / "The Libra Festival"; Transliteration: "Tenbin-Sai" (Japanese: 天秤祭)	March 22, 2014	April 23, 2022	

=== Season 2 (2014–15) ===
No. overall	No. in season	Official English title (Note: All English titles are taken from Crunchyroll.) Original Japanese title	Original release date	English air date	Ref.
26	1	"Shiroe of the Northern Lands" / "Shiroe of the Northern Nation"; Transliteration: "Kita no Kuni no Shiroe" (Japanese: 北の国のシロエ)	October 4, 2014	April 30, 2022	
27	2	"The Outlaw and Mithril Eyes"; Transliteration: "Muhōmono to Misuriru Aizu" (Japanese: 無法者とミスリルアイズ)	October 11, 2014	May 7, 2022	
28	3	"The Abyssal Shaft"; Transliteration: "Naraku no Sandō" (Japanese: 奈落の参道)	October 18, 2014	May 14, 2022	
29	4	"Shattered Wings"; Transliteration: "Hibiware ta Tsubasa" (Japanese: ひび割れた翼)	October 25, 2014	May 21, 2022	
30	5	"Christmas Eve"; Transliteration: "Kurisumasu Ibu" (Japanese: クリスマス・イブ)	November 1, 2014	May 28, 2022	
31	6	"A Lost Child at Dawn"; Transliteration: "Yoake no Mayoigo" (Japanese: 夜明けの迷い子)	November 8, 2014	June 4, 2022	
32	7	"The Suifū Maidens" / "The Maidens of Watermaple"; Transliteration: "Suifū no Otome-tachi" (Japanese: 水楓の乙女たち)	November 15, 2014	June 11, 2022	
33	8	"Akihabara Raid" / "Akiba Raid"; Transliteration: "Akiba Reido" (Japanese: アキバレイド)	November 22, 2014	June 18, 2022	
34	9	"The Changing Battlefield"; Transliteration: "Kawariyuku Senjō" (Japanese: 変わりゆく戦場)	November 29, 2014	June 25, 2022	
35	10	"Guild Master"; Transliteration: "Girudo Masutā" (Japanese: ギルドマスター)	December 6, 2014	July 2, 2022	
36	11	"Retry"; Transliteration: "Ritorai" (Japanese: リトライ)	December 13, 2014	July 9, 2022	
37	12	"The Gold of the Kunie" / "Kunie's Gold"; Transliteration: "Kunie no Ōgon" (Japanese: 供贄の黄金)	December 20, 2014	July 16, 2022	
38	13	"2.14 A Sweet Trap" / "2.14 Tender Trap"; Transliteration: "Ni-ten Ichi Yon Amai Wana" (Japanese: 2.14 甘いワナ)	December 27, 2014	July 23, 2022	
39	14	"Kanami, Go East!"; Transliteration: "Kanami, Gō! Īsuto!" (Japanese: カナミ、ゴー！イースト！)	January 10, 2015	July 30, 2022	
40	15	"A New Journey"; Transliteration: "Tabidachi" (Japanese: 旅立ち)	January 17, 2015	August 6, 2022	
41	16	"The Midday Vampire"; Transliteration: "Mahiru no Kyūketsuki" (Japanese: 真昼の吸血鬼)	January 24, 2015	August 13, 2022	
42	17	"Odyssey Knights"; Transliteration: "Odyusseia Kishidan" (Japanese: オデュッセイア騎士団)	January 31, 2015	August 20, 2022	
43	18	"When the Concert Ends"; Transliteration: "Raibu ga Hanetara" (Japanese: ライブがはねたら)	February 7, 2015	August 27, 2022	
44	19	"The Red Night"; Transliteration: "Akaki Yoru" (Japanese: 赤き夜)	February 14, 2015	September 3, 2022	
45	20	"Birthday Song"; Transliteration: "Bāsudei Songu" (Japanese: バースデイ・ソング)	February 21, 2015	September 10, 2022	
46	21	"The Skylarks Take Flight"; Transliteration: "Hibari-tachi no Habataki" (Japanese: ひばりたちの羽ばたき)	February 28, 2015	September 17, 2022	
47	22	"Stranger"; Transliteration: "Ihōjin" (Japanese: 異邦人)	March 7, 2015	September 24, 2022	
48	23	"Isaac and Iselus"; Transliteration: "Aizakku to Iserusu" (Japanese: アイザックとイセルス)	March 14, 2015	October 1, 2022	
49	24	"Sleep of the Eternal Moth"; Transliteration: "Jōga no Nemuri" (Japanese: 常蛾の眠り)	March 21, 2015 (Note: Episode 24 premiered in NHK Educational TV's Saturday 18:25 (06:25 p.m. JST) time slot, due to the coverage of a local baseball sporting event on March 21, 2015.)	October 8, 2022	
50	25	"The Pioneers"; Transliteration: "Kaitakusha-tachi" (Japanese: 開拓者たち)	March 28, 2015	October 15, 2022	

=== Season 3: Destruction of the Round Table (2021) ===
No. overall	No. in season	Title (Note: All English titles are taken from Funimation.)	Directed by (Note: Information is taken from the ending credits of each episode.)	Written by	Original release date	English air date
51	1	"Rayneshia's Marriage"; Transliteration: "Reineshia no Kekkon" (Japanese: レイネシアの結婚)	Toshinori Watanabe	Toshizō Nemoto	January 13, 2021	October 22, 2022
52	2	"The Duke of Akiba"; Transliteration: "Akiba Kōshaku" (Japanese: アキバ公爵)	Akira Koremoto	Toshizō Nemoto	January 20, 2021	October 29, 2022
53	3	"The Round Table Fractures"; Transliteration: "Hibiwareru Entaku" (Japanese: ひびわれる円卓)	Yūshi Suzuki	Shinsuke Ōnishi	January 27, 2021	November 5, 2022
54	4	"Akiba General Election"; Transliteration: "Akiba Sōsenkyo" (Japanese: アキバ総選挙)	Tōru Ishida	Shingo Irie	February 3, 2021	November 12, 2022
55	5	"Blessings"; Transliteration: "Sorezore no Shukufuku" (Japanese: それぞれの祝福)	Shunji Yoshida	Shinsuke Ōnishi	February 10, 2021	November 19, 2022
56	6	"Immortal in Ethereal Utopia"; Transliteration: "Tōgenkyō no Sen-kun" (Japanese: 桃源郷の仙君)	Gorō Kuji	Toshizō Nemoto	February 17, 2021	November 26, 2022
57	7	"Not A Curse"; Transliteration: "Noroi de wa Naku" (Japanese: 呪いではなく)	Toshinori Watanabe	Toshizō Nemoto	February 24, 2021	December 3, 2022
58	8	"The Oldest Ancients"; Transliteration: "Saiko no Koraishu" (Japanese: 最古の古来種)	Daiei Andō	Shingo Irie	March 3, 2021	December 10, 2022
59	9	"Adoration"; Transliteration: "Akogare" (Japanese: あこがれ)	Yūshi Suzuki	Shingo Irie	March 10, 2021	December 17, 2022
60	10	"Labyrinth in Akiba"; Transliteration: "Akiba no Meikyū" (Japanese: アキバの迷宮)	Naoki Murata	Shinsuke Ōnishi	March 17, 2021	December 31, 2022
61	11	"Despair Genius"; Transliteration: "Shitsubō no Tensai" (Japanese: 失望の典災)	Toshinori Watanabe	Toshizō Nemoto	March 24, 2021	January 7, 2023
62	12	"Song of the Nightingales"; Transliteration: "Naichingēru no Uta" (Japanese: 夜啼鳥の唄)	Toshinori Watanabe	Toshizō Nemoto	March 31, 2021	January 14, 2023
