= List of Log Horizon volumes =

Log Horizon
- Created by: Mamare Touno; Kazuhiro Hara
- Owner: Shōsetsuka ni Narō
- Years: 2010–2018

Print publications
- Novel(s): The Beginning of Another World (2011) The Knights of Camelot (2011) Game's End, Part I (2011) Game's End, Part II (2011) A Sunday in Akiba (2011) Lost Child of the Dawn (2013) Gold of the Kunie (2013) The Larks Take Flight (2014) Kanami, Go! East! (2015) Homesteading the Noosphere (2015) Krusty, Tycoon Lord (2018) Destruction of the Round Table (2017) Song of the Nightingales (2017) Twilight Orphan (2017)
- Comics: Honey Moon Logs (2013–2014) Log Horizon (2013–2015) The West Wind Brigade (2013–2019) Nyanta-hancho Shiawase no Recipe (2013–2018) Kanami, Go! East!

Log Horizon is a Japanese light novel series written by Mamare Touno and illustrated by Kazuhiro Hara. It initially appeared in installments on the user-generated content site Shōsetsuka ni Narō ("So You Want to be a Novelist") starting on April 13, 2010, and subsequently published in book form by Enterbrain since March 2011. Yen Press obtained the rights on its light novel imprint to release the novels in English from 2015.

The novel series has received four manga adaptations, all written by Mamare Touno. The first adaptation is illustrated by Motoya Matsu and titled, Log Horizon Gaiden: Honey Moon Logs. It began serialization on January 27, 2012, and is published by ASCII Media Works in the Dengeki Daioh magazine. The second adaptation is illustrated by Kazuhiro Hara and titled Log Horizon. It began serialization on May 18, 2012, and was published by Enterbrain in the Famitsu Comic Clear web magazine. Yen Press obtained this manga for an English release. The third adaptation is illustrated by Koyuki and titled, Log Horizon: The West Wind Brigade. It began serialization on July 9, 2012, ended on March 9, 2018, and was published by Fujimi Shobo in the Age Premium magazine. Another manga illustrated by Sōchū and titled, Log Horizon Gaiden: Nyanta-honcho Shiawase no Recipe began serialization on December 21, 2012, ended on March 31, 2018, and was published by Enterbrain in the Comic B's LOG magazine and collected in six volumes. A manga Log Horizon: Kanami, Go! East! illustrated by Kou was serialized in Comic B's LOG from October 1, 2015, to December 1, 2016, and compiled in two volumes.

== Volume list ==
=== Light novels ===
No.	Title	Original release date	English release date
1	The Beginning of Another World; Isekai no Hajimari (異世界のはじまり)	March 31, 2011; 978-4-04-727145-6	April 21, 2015; 978-0-316-38305-9
2	The Knights of Camelot; Kyamerotto no Kishi-tachi (キャメロットの騎士たち)	May 30, 2011; 978-4-04-727298-9	July 21, 2015; 978-0-316-26381-8
3	Game's End, Part I Gēmu no Owari [Jō] (ゲームの終わり【上】)	August 31, 2011; 978-4-04-727413-6	November 17, 2015; 978-0-316-26384-9
4	Game's End, Part II; Gēmu no Owari [Ge] (ゲームの終わり【下】)	September 30, 2011; 978-4-04-727543-0	March 22, 2016; 978-0-316-26385-6
5	A Sunday in Akiba; Akiba no Machi no Nichiyōbi (アキバの街の日曜日)	November 30, 2011; 978-4-04-727669-7	July 19, 2016; 978-0-316-26386-3
6	Lost Child of the Dawn; Yoake no Mayoigo (夜明けの迷い子)	March 30, 2013; 978-4-04-728235-3	November 15, 2016; 978-0-316-26387-0
7	Gold of the Kunie; Kunie no Ougon (供贄の黄金)	December 20, 2013; 978-4-04-729175-1 (regular edition); 978-4-04-729176-8 (special edition)	March 21, 2017; 978-0-316-26388-7
8	The Larks Take Flight; Hibari-tachi no Habataki (雲雀(ひばり)たちの羽ばたき)	September 29, 2014; 978-4-04-729926-9 (regular edition); 978-4-04-729927-6 (special edition)	June 20, 2017; 978-0-316-47095-7
9	Kanami, Go! East! Kanami, Gō! Īsuto! (カナミ、ゴー！イースト！)	March 27, 2015; 978-4-04-730190-0	October 31, 2017; 978-0-316-47097-1
10	Homesteading the Noosphere; Noasfia no Kaikon (ノウアスフィアの開墾)	September 30, 2015; 978-4-04-730674-5	February 20, 2018; 978-0-316-47105-3
11	Krusty, Tycoon Lord; Kurasuti Taikūn Rōdo (クラスティ・タイクーン・ロード)	March 20, 2018; 978-4-04-727230-9	January 29, 2019; 978-1-9753-2941-9

Several additional volumes have been released only as web-novels.

- 円卓崩壊 (Entaku Hōkai) (Destruction of the Round Table); completed January 7, 2017
- 夜啼鳥の唄 (Naichingūru no Uta) (Song of the Nightingales); completed April 16, 2017
- 黄昏の孤児 (Tasogare no Minashigo) (Twilight Orphan); started August 2017

=== Manga ===
==== Honey Moon Logs ====
Log Horizon Gaiden: Honey Moon Logs (ログ・ホライズン 外伝: Honey Moon Logs)

No.	Release date	ISBN
1	February 27, 2013	978-4-04-891353-9
2	February 27, 2013	978-4-04-891354-6
3	September 27, 2013	978-4-04-891938-8
4	August 27, 2014	978-4-04-866701-2

==== Log Horizon ====
Log Horizon (ログ・ホライズン, Rogu Horaizun)

No.	Original release date	Original ISBN	English release date	English ISBN
1	February 15, 2013	978-4-04-728718-1	March 24, 2015	978-0-316-38306-6

==== The West Wind Brigade ====
Log Horizon: The West Wind Brigade (ログ・ホライズン: 西風の旅団, Nishikaze no Ryōdan)

No.	Original release date	Original ISBN	English release date	English ISBN
1	February 8, 2013	978-4-04-712853-8	January 26, 2016	978-0-316-30900-4
2	September 6, 2013	978-4-04-712896-5	April 26, 2016	978-0-316-30904-2
3	March 7, 2014	978-4-04-070049-6	July 26, 2016	978-0-316-30909-7
4	October 8, 2014	978-4-04-070354-1	October 25, 2016	978-0-316-30910-3
5	March 9, 2015	978-4-04-070507-1	May 23, 2017	978-0-316-55315-5
6	October 9, 2015	978-4-04-070723-5	August 22, 2017	978-0-316-55865-5
7	April 9, 2016	978-4-04-070859-1	November 21, 2017	978-0-316-47450-4
8	October 8, 2016	978-4-04-072054-8	February 20, 2018	978-0-316-47469-6
9	May 9, 2017	978-4-04-072283-2	July 24, 2018	978-1-9753-5332-2
10	November 9, 2017	978-4-04-072495-9	November 13, 2018	978-1-9753-2811-5
11	May 9, 2018	978-4-04-072705-9	March 19, 2019	978-1-9753-8401-2

==== Nyanta-hancho Shiawase no Recipe ====
Log Horizon Gaiden: Nyanta-hancho Shiawase no Recipe (ログ・ホライズン: にゃん太班長 幸せのレシピ)

No.	Release date	ISBN
1	August 31, 2013	978-4-04-729072-3
2	September 1, 2014	978-4-04-729894-1
3	August 1, 2015	978-4-04-730600-4
4	July 1, 2016	978-4-04-734165-4
5	June 1, 2017	978-4-04-734641-3
6	March 31, 2018	978-4-04-735060-1

==== Kanami, Go! East! ====
Log Horizon: Kanami, Go! East! (ログ・ホライズン カナミ、ゴー！イースト！)

No.	Release date	ISBN
1	June 1, 2016	978-4-04-734070-1
2	December 31, 2016	978-4-04-734395-5
