= Log Horizon season 3 =

Log Horizon: Destruction of the Round Table
- Season 3
- Cover of the Blu-ray box released by NHK Enterprise in Japan on June 11, 2021 featuring Shiroe and Akatsuki.
- No. of episodes: 12

Release
- Original network: NHK Educational TV
- Original release: January 13 – March 31, 2021

Season chronology
- ← Previous; Season 2

The third season of the Japanese science fiction action anime TV series Log Horizon premiered on NHK Educational TV January 13, 2021, and concluded on March 31, 2021, with a total of 12 episodes. The series is based on the novels written by Mamare Touno. The season was originally scheduled to premiere in October 2020, but had been delayed to January 2021 due to the COVID-19 pandemic. Season 3 is titled Log Horizon: Destruction of the Round Table (Japanese: ログ・ホライズン 円卓崩壊, Hepburn: Rogu Horaizon Entaku Hōkai), named after the title of Volume 12 of the web novel series.

The cast and staff reprised their roles from the second season. The opening theme is "Different" by Band-Maid and the ending theme is "Blue Horizon" (ブルー・ホライズン, "Burū Horaizun") by Miyu Ōshiro (大城美友, Ōshiro Miyu).

== Episode list ==
No. overall	No. in season	Title (Note: All English titles are taken from Funimation.)	Directed by (Note: Information is taken from the ending credits of each episode.)	Written by	Original release date	English air date
51	1	"Rayneshia's Marriage"; Transliteration: "Reineshia no Kekkon" (Japanese: レイネシアの結婚)	Toshinori Watanabe	Toshizō Nemoto	January 13, 2021	October 22, 2022
The Round Table conference is informed that their investigation on the Fairy Rings was fruitless, which hinders their plans to create a way back and forth to the real world. Rayneshia is visited by her mother and is informed that her engagement with another noble was arranged, which leaves Rayneshia in distress due to her feelings for Crusty, who is still missing. Meanwhile, Shiroe receives a report of an investigation on several adventurers who were teleported away from the Yamato server like Crusty, but discovers that unlike him, they were not found in any other Elder Tale server and suspects that they have returned to the real world. Sometime later, Ein, the leader of the guild Honesty, loses faith on the Round Table's capacity to manage the city's affairs and accepts the offer of the Holy Westlande Empire to become a duke. Shiroe fears that Ein's move is the beginning of the end for the Round Table.
52	2	"The Duke of Akiba"; Transliteration: "Akiba Kōshaku" (Japanese: アキバ公爵)	Akira Koremoto	Toshizō Nemoto	January 20, 2021	October 29, 2022
Ein's new title as Duke of Akiba gives hope to the People of the Land living in the city, who believe that their situation will improve, but Shiroe and his friends are worried about how it would affect the Round Table and the relations between Akiba and Eastal. Meanwhile, Intics is informed about the situation in Akiba and intends to oppose Nureha's effort to have Minami join forces with the Round Table, as Intics' main objective to take over the entire Yamato server for herself. Rayneshia is informed by Lord Malves that her marriage with Utena Saiguu Touri, heir of the Saiguu Family will be held within one week. At the Round Table Conference, Ein reveals his motives for accepting his new title, affirming that the incapacity of the conference to enforce authority in the city is a liability and announces that Honesty is seceding from the Round Table. After the meeting, Shiroe is called by Ein for a meeting in private, with Malves and Touri also participating.
53	3	"The Round Table Fractures"; Transliteration: "Hibiwareru Entaku" (Japanese: ひびわれる円卓)	Yūshi Suzuki	Shinsuke Ōnishi	January 27, 2021	November 5, 2022
Shiroe and Naotsugu attend a meeting with Ein, Malves and Touri. In the occasion, Ein reveals his motives for seceding from the Round Table, affirming that the People of the Land's lack of representativity on the conference's decisions is unaccepted and that four other main guilds are also withdrawing from it. Shiroe also learns from Touri that both the Westlande Senate and Intics are conspiring to begin a war against Eastal and Akiba. Recognizing Shiroe's merits, both Ein and Touri asks for his cooperation, but their conversation is interrupted by Rayneshia, who openly refuses to marry Touri and thanks to Crusty's words of encouragement left to her, asks Shiroe to prevent the Round Table from being dissolved. To deal with the impasse, Shiroe suggests that a general election must be held in Akiba, including all its citizens, adventurers or not, to decide its future.
54	4	"Akiba General Election"; Transliteration: "Akiba Sōsenkyo" (Japanese: アキバ総選挙)	Tōru Ishida	Shingo Irie	February 3, 2021	November 12, 2022
The city of Akiba prepares for an election to choose between the Akiba Government, represented by Ein, or a reformed Round Table, represented by Reyneshia as their new form of government. Before the campaign begins, Reyneshia meets her mother and grandfather, convincing them to allow her to follow her own path. As the campaign progresses, the polls show that Ein leads by a huge margin due to his endorsement from the Saiguu Family and Reyneshia's refusal to marry Touri, which damaged her reputation as a noble. On the election's eve, Ein recognizes that he has the advantage, but is wary about what Shiroe is planning to do in order to reverse the situation.
55	5	"Blessings"; Transliteration: "Sorezore no Shukufuku" (Japanese: それぞれの祝福)	Shunji Yoshida	Shinsuke Ōnishi	February 10, 2021	November 19, 2022
In the day of the election, after Ein makes his final speech, Akiba's main gate is reactivated and thousands of citizens of Susukino emerge from them to participate in the voting. During Reyneshia's speech, she reveals that not only she, but Regan and Kinjō will be part of the New Round Table representing the People of the Land should their side wins. Both facts make Ein and Utena's side admit defeat before the votes are counted and Utena returns to the west, accompanied by Ein who becomes his trusted friend.
56	6	"Immortal in Ethereal Utopia"; Transliteration: "Tōgenkyō no Sen-kun" (Japanese: 桃源郷の仙君)	Gorō Kuji	Toshizō Nemoto	February 17, 2021	November 26, 2022
Misa and Rieze hold a puppet show to tell Shiroe and the others Crusty's exploits since his disappearance. They reveal that stranded into the Chinese server, Crusty was rescued by a wolf and sheltered into a temple maintained by the magician Youren but was afflicted with a curse that seals most of his powers and memories. Meanwhile, Kanami and her party continue their journey to Yamato to investigate the cause of the apocalypse and among them is Elias Hackblade, an Ancient Blademancer who one of Elder Tale's poster characters and is aflicted with a curse that prevents his attacks from harming any opponent with less than a quarter of their maximum hit points. Being a level 100 character, Elias is banned from entering a nearby dungeon, forcing Kanami and the others to leave him behind, and accusing Crusty of being a Genius, Yourei convinces Elias to fight him. Crusty barely escapes with his life, while Yourei uses her powers on Elias to put him under her control.
57	7	"Not A Curse"; Transliteration: "Noroi de wa Naku" (Japanese: 呪いではなく)	Toshinori Watanabe	Toshizō Nemoto	February 24, 2021	December 3, 2022
Crusty is rescued by Kanami's party and they are attacked by Yourei, Elias and a Raid Boss also under her control. While Leonardo faces Elias alone, Crusty fights Yourei, who is revealed as the Genius Papus, and Kanami fights and defeats the raid boss with the rest of her party and help from the Lelang Wolf Cavalry Guild. During their fight, Crusty remembers that he was cursed by the Genius Bucaphi after refusing to become his vessel and sacrifices some of his own memories to power up his attacks while taking advantage of some loopholes on the curse to counter their effects and destroy Papus, while Leonardo convinces Elias that his incapacity to kill others is not a curse, but a sign of how he values the lives of others and breaks him free from Papus' brainwashing. After the battle, Crusty joins Kanami's party and they continue their journey back to Yamato. After the puppet show, Shiroe realizes that the Geniuses originate from the Moon Server and like Crusty, starts thinking on a way to take the fight to them.
58	8	"The Oldest Ancients"; Transliteration: "Saiko no Koraishu" (Japanese: 最古の古来種)	Daiei Andō	Shingo Irie	March 3, 2021	December 10, 2022
By Shiroe's suggestion, Rayneshia decides to take a leave from her duties in the New Round Table and travel to the Chinese server by boat to help bring Crusty and the others back home. Meanwhile, Minori and her friends befriend the sisters Lelia and Litka Mofur and decide to shelter them at Log Horizon's guild base. Shiroe, Nyanta and Tetra recognize Lelia and Litka as two old questgiver characters from Elder Tale's early days who are known for being clumsy and troublemaking, having doubts about having them around until the sisters reveal that they are following the trail of an unknown monster called Ereinus, which makes them deduce that a Genius is about to attack the city.
59	9	"Adoration"; Transliteration: "Akogare" (Japanese: あこがれ)	Yūshi Suzuki	Shingo Irie	March 10, 2021	December 17, 2022
Shiroe and the others decide to give shelter to the Mofur sisters after learning of Ereinus' impending threat from them. With their level high enough to participate in raids, the junior members of Log Horizon begin training with their seniors, while Minori invites Shiroe to shop for supplies in order to get closer to him. Meanwhile, Rayneshia discusses with Misa and Rieze the details of their expedition to the Chinese server in order to rescue Crusty. Some days later, Minori and her friends notice that their seniors are missing, and she realizes that Ereinus is attacking the city.
60	10	"Labyrinth in Akiba"; Transliteration: "Akiba no Meikyū" (Japanese: アキバの迷宮)	Naoki Murata	Shinsuke Ōnishi	March 17, 2021	December 31, 2022
Ereinus uses his powers to teleport all adventurers in Akiba to an alternate space filled with Level 65 monsters while reducing their levels to 35. While running away, Shiroe deduces that the Genius have learned to use the game mechanics against them, taking advantage of the "Teacher System", that temporarily reduces the levels of higher ranked players to those of their lower-level companions. After getting more information of the enemy monsters from Isaac and Rieze, Shiroe and the others meet Lelia and Litka and realize that their levels were not reduced at all, confirming that Ereinus' power only affects players whose level are over 65. He then instructs the sisters to rendezvous with Minori and Akatsuki, who had her level adjusted to Minori's via the Teacher System, to help them mount a counterattack.
61	11	"Despair Genius"; Transliteration: "Shitsubō no Tensai" (Japanese: 失望の典災)	Toshinori Watanabe	Toshizō Nemoto	March 24, 2021	January 7, 2023
Akatsuki and Minori reunite with their friends from both Log Horizon and the Crescent Moon Alliance. Having learned from Lelia and Litka that Ereinus is waiting on the Round Table's Assembly Hall, they form a raid party. Together, the young players fight their way to the Hall where they confront Ereinus, having the upper hand until the enemy uses his special ability to remove the players' memories from those they admire most to break their spirit. As Ereinus proceeds to wipe out the party, Akatsuki and the Mofur sisters who were unaffected by the enemy's power fight back while inspiring the others to recompose.
62	12	"Song of the Nightingales"; Transliteration: "Naichingēru no Uta" (Japanese: 夜啼鳥の唄)	Toshinori Watanabe	Toshizō Nemoto	March 31, 2021	January 14, 2023
While Akatsuki, Lelia and Litka keep Ereinus busy, Minori and the others regroup and resume their attack, eventually defeating the Genius together after discovering his weak point. With Ereinus defeated, the alternate space is lifted and all players are liberated. As the Adventurers celebrate their victory, Lelia and Litka decide to stay in Akiba and join Log Horizon. Later at night, Minori confesses her feelings for Shiroe, who reveals that he likes someone else, and is heartbroken. Minori is consoled by her friends. Sometime later, Shiroe decides that his next step is to travel to Minami and Regan offers himself to accompany him.
