= List of Log Horizon characters =

The characters of the Log Horizon guild in the series. From left: Nyanta, Akatsuki, Shiroe, Naotsugu, Minori, Tohya, Rundelhaus Code and Isuzu.

This is a list of characters in the Japanese novel series Log Horizon written by Mamare Touno.

== Adventurers ==
The adventurers are the combat oriented human role-players in Elder Tale. Before the events of the Apocalypse they would explore the land while completing quests and battling monsters and so level up. However, after finding themselves trapped inside the Elder Tale game as their in-game avatars, the players must now find a way to survive in a lawless world. In contrast to the natives, adventurers that are killed respawn at the cathedral of the nearest city they have personally explored. However each revival takes away a portion of their memories in the form of experience points.

=== Akihabara ===
Akihabara is the largest player city on the Japanese server, known as Yamato, and is the server's analogue to the real world district in Tokyo. The guild masters of the eleven major guilds of Akihabara form the Round Table Alliance, which governs the city's affairs. The Round Table is later reformed to also include representants from the People of the Land.

==== Log Horizon ====
Shiroe (シロエ)
Voiced by: Takuma Terashima (Japanese); Mike Yager (English)
Shiroe is the main protagonist of the series and Log Horizon's founding guild master who is an Enchanter class with a Scribe subclass, which enables him to cast powerful support spells on his allies and accurately draw maps of the places he has visited. His real name is Kei Shirogane (城鐘 恵, Shirogane Kei), a socially awkward engineering graduate student who played Elder Tale for almost eight years. During that time, Shiroe was the strategist of the long-disbanded Debauchery Tea Party, an informal (non-guild) group of elite players who completed high level group quests known as Raids, and gained infamy as "Shiroe the Strategist" or the "Villain in Glasses" (腹ぐろ眼鏡, Haraguro Megane) for his sometime unethical approach in solving a solution. Shiroe initially had strong reservations about joining guilds until the aftermath of the Apocalypse and the ensuing despair among the players convinces him to establish Log Horizon, organizing Akiba's Round Table council through a highly complex plan to buy Akiba's Guild Building so he can remove criminal guilds from Akiba by banning them from the Guild Building premises.
Naotsugu (直継)
Voiced by: Tomoaki Maeno (Japanese); Andrew Love (English)
Naotsugu is Shiroe's best friend and was also a member of the now-disbanded Debauchery Tea Party group. His real name is Naotsugu Hasegawa (葉瀬川 直継, Hasegawa Naotsugu). His main class is "Guardian", allowing him to use heavy armor and weapons along with powerful defense spells to protect him and his companions as well as various trap spells to deal intense damage, while his secondary class is "Border Patrol". He calls himself an "open pervert", claiming that unlike some men he doesn't hide his perverted nature from others and is very proud of that fact. He has a tendency to get on Akatsuki's bad side with his perverted comments and a running gag is their confrontations usually ending with him getting a knee to the face, before she asks Shiroe for permission to do so. In the real world, he worked as a salaryman.
Akatsuki (アカツキ)
Voiced by: Emiri Katō (Japanese); Jad Saxton (English)
Akatsuki is an Assassin within the world of Elder Tale. Her secondary class is "Tracker", which enhances her assassin skills with stealth and detecting abilities. She was initially acquainted with Shiroe after having partied with him to complete quests prior to the Apocalypse. Despite appearing to be a pre-teen, she is a college student like Shiroe, whose real name is Shizuka Hanekura (羽倉静, Hanekura Shizuka). After Shiroe helps her, she starts referring to him as her "Lord" and joins his party, claiming that it is out of gratitude but it is later shown that she is infatuated with him. She has a violent relationship with Naotsugu because of his "open pervertedness" and usually resorts to pre-emptive violence to stop his perverted comments before they can be spoken.
Nyanta (にゃん太)
Voiced by: Jōji Nakata (Japanese); Jovan Jackson (English)
Nyanta is a felinoid Swashbuckler. He was the former Chief of the Debauchery Tea Party and an old friend of Shiroe's. His subclass is "Chef", which allows him to make delicious foods using ingredients, which is quite a reprieve from the tasteless pre-made food that is offered in Elder Tale, and ends up being an important plot point. Before the Apocalypse he was part of a guild called "The Cat Food Guild", which was composed solely of cat people. It disbanded after their house caved in due to bad weather.
Tohya (トウヤ, Tōya)
Voiced by: Daiki Yamashita (Japanese); Greg Ayres (English)
Toyha is Minori's younger twin brother. His class is "Samurai", a tank class capable of using heavy armor and weaponry and casting special spells to increase his performance that must be used with caution due to their long cooldown time, as well as using techniques that, while flashy, do little damage and are solely meant to pull the attention of enemies away from his allies. His subclass is "Accountant", which gives him better prices when bartering with the People of the Earth. When Tohya and his older sister first met Shiroe, Tohya immediately started pestering him with questions on how to gain skills. He views Shiroe as a role model due to not only his strength and knowledge, but also his cool and kind personality. While Minori is shy and gentle, Tohya is very brash but it is clear he greatly cares for his older sister. When Tohya and his older sister were trapped in the unethical guild Hamelin, he often wondered what Shiroe would do in that situation. After they were rescued by Shiroe and his friends, Tohya joins Log Horizon with his older sister and now tries to emulate Shiroe when faced with challenges. In the real world, Tohya was struck by a car in an accident which left him near dead. He was able to recover, however the accident left his lower body completely paralyzed. He greatly enjoys being able to use his legs again in the world of Log Horizon.
Minori (ミノリ)
Voiced by: Nao Tamura (Japanese); Luci Christian (English)
Minori is a young girl trapped in the world of Elder Tale with her younger brother Tohya. Her class is "Kannagi", a healer dressed as a Japanese shrine maiden whose spells are focused on preventing damage and debuffs to her and her allies instead of just treating them. Minori and her younger brother met Shiroe on their first day playing Elder Tale and asked him questions about gaining skills and healing spells. Although Shiroe disliked when people ask him for things, after meeting them he decided to teach them about the game and even lowered his avatar's stats so he could travel with them safely. Minori and her younger brother were with Shiroe when the Apocalypse began and were separated from Shiroe afterwards. Lost and without anyone to guide them, she and her younger brother decided to join the guild Hamelin to try to gain experience and levels, but the Hamelin guild masters exploited them (and other low level players) instead. After being rescued, Minori and her younger brother join Log Horizon and she starts studying Elder Tale's game mechanics under Shiroe, in order to become a strategist like him, but later realizes that she is in love with him, just like Akatsuki; both often compete for Shiroe's affection, until Minori confesses to Shiroe, who reveals that he likes someone else. Her original secondary class is "Tailor" but she later switches it to "Apprentice", allowing her to become Shiroe's official disciple and learn some of his skills as well.
Isuzu (五十鈴)
Voiced by: Eriko Matsui (Japanese); Meg McDonald (English)
Isuzu is a high school girl who started to play Elder Tale around the time when the Apocalypse happened. Her class is "Bard", using her songs to increase her and her allies' stats and cast debuffs at groups of enemies and her subclass is "Nomad". She first appears as one of the exploited players by Hamelin, often seen comforting Minori, and then later during the summer camp and becomes a close friend of Rundelhaus Code and is the first to learn that he is one of the People of the Land. She later joins Log Horizon with him.
Rundelhaus Code (ルンデルハウス=コード, Runderuhausu Kōdo)
Voiced by: Tetsuya Kakihara (Japanese); Tyler Galindo (English)
Rundelhaus Code (often called "Rudy' by his friends) is a loud-mouthed, egotistical sorcerer who specializes in offensive magic. Due to his self-centered attitude, his relationship with the party members during the summer camp goes off to a rocky and awkward start, however he befriends them quickly after defeating the dungeon as a team. During the "Goblin King's Return" quest, it is revealed that Rundelhaus is one of the People of the Land who pretended to be an adventurer. After being mortally wounded, he signs a contract with Shiroe who uses a new type of magic invented by him to save his life and give him the secondary class "Adventurer". He joins Log Horizon and becomes close friends with Isuzu.
Tetra (てとら, Tetora)
Voiced by: Yukiyo Fujii (Japanese); Chelsea McCurdy (English)
Tetra is a level 90 Cleric and her subclass is "Idol". A former resident of Minami, one of the players cities in Yamato, and member of Light Indigo, she was sent by Kazuhiko to aid Shiroe at Susukino. Upon completion of the mission, she asks Shiroe to join Log Horizon and was accepted. Tetra often teases and flirts with Naotsugu for kicks and only a few are aware of the fact that she is actually male, but with a female avatar.
Lelia Mofur (レリア=モフール, Reria Mofūru)
Voiced by: Manaka Iwami (Japanese); Monica Rial (English)
Lelia is a Level 65 Wolf Fang Monk with a serious and miser demeanor who originally was part of the Knights of Izumo and one of Elder Tale's questgiver characters. Her secondary class is "Sigilmancer", allowing her to empower items by engraving magic runes on them. Later she joins Log Horizon along her younger sister Litka.
Litka Mofur (リトカ=モフール, Ritoka Mofūru)
Voiced by: Nanami Yamashita (Japanese); Natalie Rial (English)
Litka is a Level 65 Wolf Fang Druid with a childish demeanor who originally was part of the Knights of Izumo and one of Elder Tale's questgiver characters. Her secondary class is "Collector", which increases the drop rates of items. Later she joins Log Horizon along her older sister Lelia.

==== Crescent Moon Alliance ====
Marielle (マリエール, Mariēru)
Voiced by: Yumi Hara (Japanese); Maggie Flecknoe (English)
Marielle, the rather eccentric guild master of the Crescent Moon Alliance guild (which is also part of the Round Table council as the representative of lesser guilds in Akiba) and a friend of Shiroe's, is a Cleric. Her real name is Marie Sakamoto (坂本 鞠絵, Sakamoto Marie). She is stronger than she looks and has a habit of hugging people so hard she slams them into walls. She usually does this when meeting new people or greeting a friend, and her preferred victim is Naotsugu with whom she is infatuated. However, she can be very serious when required. This holds true especially when a member of her guild is in danger.
Henrietta (ヘンリエッタ)
Voiced by: Ayahi Takagaki (Japanese); Shelley Calene-Black (English)
Henrietta is a Bard and one of the leaders of the Crescent Moon Alliance. Although she seems stern and put together, she can be just as eccentric as Marielle when she sees something cute, as becomes evident when she meets Akatsuki. Her real name is Umeko Miyanozaka (宮之阪 梅子, Miyanozaka Umeko) and she dislikes it when Marielle calls her so. She is an accountant and MBA in real life and is a great asset to Shiroe's plans due to her ability to negotiate with others. It is not known whether her skills at cosplay in Log Horizon have carried over from the old world. Working closely with Shiroe eventually leads to Henrietta developing a romantic interest in him.
Serara (セララ)
Voiced by: Misaki Kuno (Japanese); Hilary Haag (English)
A young Druid of the Crescent Moon Alliance. She is level 19 when first introduced, with a secondary class of Maid, which she often regrets choosing because it only helps her to perform housekeeping chores. She develops a crush on Nyanta after he saves her and keeps her hidden from her enemies. This leads Shiroe and Naotsugu to wonder if she has a fetish for older (middle-aged?) men. Although not a member of Log Horizon, she visits them often partly due to her crush, as well as being a regular member of Tohya and Minori's party.
Shōryū (小竜)
Voiced by: Ryōta Ōsaka (Japanese); Houston Hayes (English)
A Level 90 swashbuckler and member of the Crescent Moon Alliance. He is in love with Marielle and goes to great lengths to try to impress her. He also becomes something of an older brother figure to the low level players who joined the guild after being rescued from Hamelin. His real name is Shousuke.
Eizel (アイゼル, Aizeru)
Voiced by: Taishi Murata (Japanese); Chris Patton (English)
Hien (飛燕)
Voiced by: Shōhei Kajikawa (Japanese); Blake Shepard (English)
Liliana (リリアナ, Ririana)
Voiced by: Sora Amamiya (Japanese); Katelyn Barr (English)
Ashlynn (アシュリン, Ashurin)
Voiced by: Kanami Satō (Japanese); Krystal LaPorte (English)
Asuka (明日架)
Voiced by: Minami Takahashi (Japanese); Samantha Stevens (English)
Giroff (ギーロフ, Gīrofu)
Voiced by: Taishi Murata (Japanese); David Wald (English)

==== D.D.D. ====
Crusty (クラスティ, Kurasuti)
Voiced by: Takahiro Sakurai (Japanese); Jay Hickman (English)
The guild leader of D.D.D., the biggest combat guild in Akiba. He is a Guardian-Berserker and the spokesman of the Round Table Alliance.
Misa Takayama (高山 三佐, Takayama Misa)
Voiced by: Kaori Nazuka (Japanese); Krystal LaPorte (Season 1 and 3), Genevieve Simmons (Season 2) (English)
A level 90 Bard and Crusty's aide in D.D.D.
Riese (リーゼ, Rīze)
Voiced by: Rie Murakawa (Japanese); Jessica Boone (English)

==== Black Sword Knights ====
Issac (アイザック, Aizakku)
Voiced by: Satoshi Hino (Japanese); George Manley (English)
Guild master of Black Sword Knights, one of the members of the Round Table council. Originally he was opposed to the Round Table Alliance but he was forced to join after D.D.D. and most of the other guilds joined in. Despite having an abrasive personality, he does show understanding and some compassion when he puts his pride aside.
Rezric (レザリック, Rezarikku)
Voiced by: Hironori Saitō (Japanese); Mike Vance (English)

==== Honesty ====
Ein (アインス, Ainsu)
Voiced by: Masakazu Nishida (Japanese); Mike Vance (English)
Guild master of Honesty, one of the members of the Round Table council.
Sigel (シゲル, Shigeru)
Voiced by: Shōhei Kajikawa (Japanese); Christopher Ayres (English)

==== West Wind Brigade ====
While having a much smaller size compared to most other members of the Round Table Council, West Wind Brigade is known for having one of the best combating squads in Akiba. The essence of the guild, however, is being a fan club of Seta, with members consisting almost entirely of the female admirers of Seta besides himself.

Soujirou Seta (ソウジロウ=セタ, Sōjirō Seta)
Voiced by: Hiro Shimono (Japanese); Matt Hune (Seasons 1-2), Justin Briner (Season 3) (English)
Guild master of the West Wind Brigade and one of the members of the Round Table Council. Former member of Debauchery Tea Party. When introduced after the Apocalypse, he was slightly wary of Shiroe as the latter rejected his offer to join the West Wind Brigade, mistaking it as a sign that Shiroe did not like him (this was quickly cleared up). He is a Lv.90 Samurai and threw his full support behind Shiroe before the conference as he was used to "fighting from the front". He is also exceptionally popular with women.
Nazuna (ナズナ)
Voiced by: Kaori Nazuka (Japanese); Brittany Deans (Seasons 1 and 2), Anairis Quiñones (Season 3) (English)
Sub-Guildmaster of West Wind Brigade, and a former member of Debauchery Tea Party.
Isami (イサミ)
Voiced by: Natsue Sasamoto (Japanese); Sarah Salimi (Season 1), Carli Mosier (Season 2) (English)
Kyōko (キョウコ)
Voiced by: Ayaka Suwa (Japanese); Kira Vincent-Davis (English)
Kawara (カワラ)
Voiced by: Shiori Izawa (Japanese); Lainee Hooks (Season 1), Christina Kelly (Season 2) (English)
Dolce (ドルチェ, Doruche)
Voiced by: Shōta Yamamoto (Japanese); Luke Patterson (English)
A transgender woman who is a member of the West Wind Brigade.
Chika (チカ)
Voiced by: Risa Taneda
Fragrant Olive (フレグラント・オリーブ, Fureguranto Orību)
Voiced by: Michiko Kaiden (Japanese); Annie Mai (English)

==== Marine Agency ====
Michitaka (ミチタカ)
Voiced by: Hiroki Gotō (Japanese); Jack Ivy (English)
Guild master of Marine Agency, one of the members of the Round Table council.
Kāyu (カーユ)
Voiced by: Taishi Murata (Japanese); David Wald (English)

==== Roderic Merchant Guild ====
Rodrick (ロデリック, Roderikku)
Voiced by: Masaki Terasoma (Japanese); David Matranga (English)
Guild master of the Roderic Merchant Guild, one of the members of the Round Table council.
Mikakage (ミカカゲ)
Voiced by: Ai Kakuma (Japanese); Melissa Molano (English)

==== Shopping Street 8 ====
Karashin (カラシン)
Voiced by: Nobuhiko Okamoto (Japanese); John Gremillion (English)
Guild master of Shopping Street 8, one of the members of the Round Table council.
Taro (タロ)
Voiced by: Genki Muro (Japanese); Joel McCray (English)

==== Grandeur ====
Woodstock W (ウッドストック=W, Uddosutokku W)
Voiced by: Hiroshi Shirokuma (Japanese); Christopher Ayres (English)
Guild master of Grandeur, one of the members of the Round Table council.

==== Radio Market ====
Ichimonjinosuke Akaneya (茜屋 一文字の介, Akaneya Ichimonjinosuke)
Voiced by: Chō (Japanese); James Belcher (English)
Guild master of Radio Market, one of the members of the Round Table council.

==== Others ====
Tatara (多々良)
Voiced by: Hisako Kanemoto (Japanese); Molly Searcy (English)
She owns a weapons store in Akiba.

=== Minami ===
Minami is a player city in the Japanese server. Its position is akin to the real world's Osaka. It is ruled by a single guild - Plant Hwyaden.

==== Plant Hwyaden ====
Nureha (濡羽)
Voiced by: Chiwa Saitō (Japanese); Tia Ballard (English)
Guild mistress and first seat of Plant Hwyaden, Nureha is a level 90 Fox Tail Enchanter who knew Shiroe before the Apocalypse and has an obsessive infatuation with him. In the real world, she was an abused high school girl who participated in compensated dating to make ends meet, and played Elder Tale to escape from her miserable life. Nureha brought the entirety of Minami after the Apocalypse and ruled it with an iron fist, forcing the players into joining her guild as she also bought the cathedral so that she can permanently kill players who speak out against her. Nureha also became an influence within the Westelande Empire, overseeing Malves's actions.
Intics (インティクス, Inchikusu)
Voiced by: Sayaka Ohara (Japanese); Kaytha Coker (Seasons 1-2), Marissa Lenti (Season 3) (English)
Former member of the Debauchery Tea Party and the true leader of Plant Hwyaden. Her former admiration for Kanami turned into hate after her abrupt departure which was also the reason behind the disbandment of the party, and now she allied Nureha striving to tear apart the former members of the party to spite Kanami. During her Tea Party days, she was called Kuina; after the disbandment, she made a new account under the name Intics.
The second seat in Plant Hwyaden, personal maid to Nureha, and the de facto leader of Minami due to Nureha not actually caring about the operation of the Guild. She actually gets the upper hand on Nureha, manipulating her by threatening to tell Shiroe about her past if she does not comply. In Episode 14 of Season 2, she told Nureha that her ultimate vision for Planet Hwyaden was world domination.
While no longer being friendly with former party members, she seem to hold an exceptional dislike towards Shiroe even back in those days.
Kazuhiko (カズ彦)
Voiced by: Masayuki Katō (Japanese); John Gremillion (English)
A level 90 Assassin, Kazuhiko is another former Debauchery Tea Party member who traveled to Minami out of a sense of justice, and is currently the seventh seat in Plant Hwyaden. He controls the Wolves of Mibu, a subdivision of Plant Hwyaden that act more as his personal army rather than follow the orders of Nureha and Intics. He sends Tetra to Shiroe in hopes of turning Shiroe's attention to Minami. Unlike many other players, Kazuhiko hates living in the world of Elder Tale and greatly desires to find a way back to Earth.
K.R.
Voiced by: Shinichiro Miki (Japanese); Scott Gibbs (English)
Another former Debauchery Tea Party member, K.R. is a level 90 Summoner. At the start of the Apocalypse, K.R. immediately used a summon to travel the world to see how the other areas were like. He stumbled upon Kanami and her party, and joined them as their mount, much to his distaste. However, during a battle against the Black Dragon and two <Genius> monsters, he was forced to summon his real body to their location and subsequently died, reviving in Minami. He then joined Plant Hwyaden and currently holds the tenth seat.
Zeldys (ゼルデュス, Zerudyusu)
Voiced by: Yūya Uchida
The third seat in Plant Hwyaden.
Mizfa Torude (ミズファ=トゥルーデ, Mizufa Tōrūde)
Voiced by: Toa Yukinari (Japanese); Allison Keith (English)
The fourth seat in Plant Hwyaden.
Nakarunad (ナカルナード, Nakarunādo)
Voiced by: Hiroshi Tsuchida
The fifth seat in Plant Hwyaden.
Quon (クオン, Kuon)
Voiced by: Yūichi Iguchi
The sixth seat in Plant Hwyaden.
Jared Gan (ジェレド=ガン, Jeredo Gan)
Voiced by: Ryō Horikawa (Japanese); James Belcher (English)
The eighth seat in Plant Hwyaden.
Loreil Dawn (ロレイル=ドーン, Roreiru Dōn)
Voiced by: Junji Majima (Japanese); Clint Bickham (English)
The ninth seat in Plant Hwyaden.

==== Others ====
Ōshima (大嶋)
One of the few people Shiroe trusts, Ōshima was asked to investigate the western city Minami.

=== Susukino ===
Susukino is a player city in the Japanese server. Its position is akin to the real world's Sapporo.

==== Silver Sword ====
Originally from Akiba, they were invited to join the Round Table but refused, and settled down in Susukino following Demiquas' fall from power, taking control of most of Brigandia including Demiquas himself. They are still allies to the Round Table and offer its members support whenever asked.

William Massachusetts (ウィリアム=マサチューセッツ, Uiriamu Masachūsettsu)
Voiced by: Yūichi Nakamura (Japanese); Chris Patton (English)
Guild master of Silver Sword. He is also known as "Mithril Eyes William".
Voinen (ヴォイネン)
Voiced by: Shinnosuke Ogami (Japanese); Josh Morrison (English)
Federico (フェデリコ, Federiko)
Voiced by: Kenta Sasa (Japanese); John Swasey (English)
Dincron (ディンクロン, Dinkuron)
Voiced by: Shōhei Kajikawa (Japanese); Gareth West (English)
Azalea (アザレア, Azarea)

==== Brigandia ====
A dark guild which takes advantage of the lawless nature of the Elder Tale world to control Susukino with an iron grip, until being ousted by the Silver Swords.

Demiquas (デミクァス, Demikasu)
Voiced by: Atsushi Imaruoka (Japanese); Rob Mungle (English)
Guild master of Brigandia, he was the ruler of Susukino until being defeated by William. Shiroe used to provoke him by intentionally mispronouncing his name. After falling from grace, he falls in love with Upashi and settles down with her. He despises Shiroe because he does not fight using his own power and instead uses others to deal damage while he stays in the shadows.
Londark (ロンダーグ, Rondārgu)
Voiced by: Eiji Miyashita (Japanese); Kyle C. Jones (English)
Also known as Londark of Gray Steel. He was a member of Brigandia and Demikas' second-in-command, but leaves him after his defeat to William. He later joins Plant Hwyaden.

==== Others ====
Upashi (ウパシ)
Voiced by: Mamiko Noto
Demiquas' wife who, despite being one of the people of the land, refused to bow to his threats, thus earning his respect and affection, a fact he refuses to admit. She genuinely seems to love her husband and to be aware of what kind of person he is in the inside.

=== Zhongyuan Server ===
A foreign server housing players from China, Mongolia and countries from Central Asia.

==== Kanami's Party ====
Kanami (カナミ)
Voiced by: Marina Inoue (Japanese); Jennifer Gilbert (English)
Former leader of Debauchery Tea Party. Her subclass is Monk and was formerly a Swashbuckler. She ended up disbanding the group because she was moving to Europe with her child and was stuck on the European server during the apocalypse, forcing her to travel by herself all the way back to Japan in order to reunite with her friends. She also believes that the secrets behind the Apocalypse lie on the Japanese server, as the "Homesteading the Noosphere" update was first deployed there. After finally managing to contact Shiroe, she gives him the task of discovering a spell to link the world of Elder Tale and Earth, allowing free transit between the realms.
Leonardo (レオナルド, Reonarudo)
Voiced by: Shūhei Sakaguchi (Japanese); Benjamin McLaughlin (English)
An American player from New York, whose use of a Fairy Ring landed him in Asia and was subsequently stuck there following the Apocalypse and now travels with Kanami. Fighting with twin swords and donning a fully green suit, his antics and the fact that he had previously lived in the sewers of the Elder Tales' US server, point that his avatar is based on the character of the same name from Teenage Mutant Ninja Turtles. His class and subclass are Assassin and Delivery Man respectively.
Coppelia (コッペリア, Kopperia)
Voiced by: Hiromi Igarashi (Japanese); Patricia Duran (English)
A former Chinese gold farming bot. Her class is Cleric, she is dressed like maid. After apocalypse she received some type of own sentience, afterwards she was found by Kanami and became her loyal partner.
Elias Hackblade (エリアス=ハックブレード, Eriasu Hakkuburēdo)
Voiced by: Daisuke Hirakawa (Japanese); Tom Long (English)
A 100-level NPC belonging to a group called the Ancient Species. He is also the mascot character of Elder Tale in-universe.

== People of the Land ==
The People of the Land are usually referred to as the non-player characters (NPCs) of the world of Elder Tale. Prior to the Apocalypse they had limited responses and mannerisms to interaction by adventurers and would normally assign quests to them and present rewards should they be completed. After the Apocalypse they somehow became sentient, able to possess emotions, language and much complexity in thought. They are usually weaker in terms of combat orientation as opposed to Adventurers and unlike Adventurers, they do not respawn after being killed, resulting in a permanent death.

=== League of Freedom Cities Eastal ===
Sergiatte Cowen (セルジアッド=コーウェン, Serujiaddo Kōwen)
Voiced by: Shinpachi Tsuji (Japanese); Marty Fleck (English)
The head of the Cowen clan, ruler of Maihama and chairperson of the League of Freedom Cities. He has an old and wizened appearance with white hair, beard and mustache. He is Lenessia's grandfather.
Lenessia Erhart Cowen (レイネシア=エルアルテ=コーウェン, Reineshia Eruarute Kōwen)
Voiced by: Mariya Ise (Japanese); Emily Neves (English)
Sergiatte's granddaughter. The acting diplomat from the League to Akiba.
One of the most famous beauties among the League. She possesses a lazy personality which is however often interpreted as a fanciful image in the public eye.
Currently in an ambiguous romantic relationship with Crusty.
Elissa (エリッサ, Erissa)
Voiced by: Ikumi Hayama (Japanese); Elise Moore (English)
Lenessia's maid.
Sarariya
Voiced by: Yuko Kaida (Japanese); Stephanie Young (English)
Sergiatte's oldest daughter and Lenessia's mother.
Regan (リ=ガン, Ri Gan)
Voiced by: Keiji Fujiwara (season 2), Yōhei Tadano (season 3) (Japanese); David Wald (English)
A sage who studies the history of Elder Tale, he befriends Shiroe and shares some of his knowledge of him, later becoming his ally. So far, he seems to be the only Lander who is aware that world of Elder Tales was a video game for the Adventurers.
Kiliva (キリヴァ, Kirivua)
Voiced by: Taishi Murata (Japanese); Ned Gayle (English)
Taihaku (タイハク)
Voiced by: Shōta Yamamoto
Krendit (クレンディット, Kurenditto)
Voiced by: Yū Kitada
Suwa (スワ)
Voiced by: Hironori Saitō
Kashiwazaki (カシワザキ)
Voiced by: Kenta Sasa
Darte (ダルテ, Darute)
Voiced by: Hironori Saitō
Fevel (フエヴェル, Fuevueru)
Voiced by: Tomosa Murata
Apret (アプレッタ, Apuretta)
Voiced by: Asuka Ōgame

=== Holy Empire Westelande ===
Malves Garitier (マルヴェス=ガリティエ, Maruvesu Garitie)
Voiced by: Yutaka Aoyama (Japanese); John Swasey (English)
A Westelande nobleman who aided in Nureha to discredit Akihabara and threaten its alliance with Eastal during the Scale Festival by causing chaos in the streets, only to be thwarted by Shiroe's quick thinking.

=== Kunie Clan ===
Kinjō (菫星)
Voiced by: Tsubasa Yonaga (Japanese); Adam Gibbs (English)
Enbart Nelles (エンバート=ネルレス, Enbāto Neruresu)
Voiced by: Hiroshi Yanaka (Japanese); Marty Fleck (English)

== Navigators ==
The Navigators are a group of beings created by an alien race. Their purpose is to search other universes for a resource called "Empathion" which powers the civilization of their creators and eventually harvest it from the worlds which they discover it. The Navigators are split into two main groups: Observers and Harvesters.

=== Observers ===
The Observers are described as artificial intelligences which arrived in the universe containing the world of Elder Tales during an event which they call "Match". They do not possess bodies of their own and hence occupy the bodies of others while still possessing their host's memories. Their primary objective is to search for empathions. Their main base of operations is located on the Moon.

Roe2 (ロエ2, Roe Tsū)
Voiced by: Ayumi Fujimura (Japanese); Kelley Peters (English)
An observer AI took the body of a secondary character used by Shiroe before the apocalypse. She is a level 90 Summoner half-Alv. Her sub-class is "vampire", giving her special buffs at night but rendering her weak to exposure to direct sunlight.

=== Harvesters ===
The Harvesters are described as creatures of slightly lesser intelligence than observers that were artificially created on the Moon using the bodies of monsters with powerful combat capabilities. Their primary objective is to harvest empathions in the form of magic points and will do so by attacking adventurers with extreme prejudice. They all possess the Genius title.

Lasphere (ラスフィア, Rasufia)
The Genius of necromancy. Kanami and her party encountered this creature on the Chinese server as they made their way to the Japanese server, Yamato. She was defeated by Leonardo after he used his superior speed to overwhelm her.
Paps (パプス, Papus)
The Genius of healing. This creature was with Lasphere when they encountered Kanami and her party. It seemed to possess a lot of information about the true nature of the world.
Camaysar (カマイサル, Kamaisaru)
The Genius of marriage. This creature wandered into the city of Akiba after its protective barrier was disabled by Kinjou and Lenessia. It posed as a Person of the Land and began seducing girls around the city. However, it was defeated when it crossed paths with the Brigade of the West Wind.
Bagris (バグリス, Bagurisu)
The Genius of measures. Another creature who infiltrated Akiba after the barrier was disabled. It posed as a Lander who was able to appraise ores and minerals and conned adventurers into paying huge sums of money for worthless materials by changing the quantities of their weight, length and value. In his true form, he is able to manipulate the quantities of distance, speed, skill damage and even targets. This posed an enormous disadvantage to the half-raid team led by Michitaka and almost resulted in their defeat. However, with the help of the Kunie Clan, Roderic was able to create a weapon called the Source Vessel which was able to nullify Bagris' abilities using a similar power and allowed the team to defeat him.
Zahun (ザフン, Zafun)
The Genius of scandal. The Nyanko Tavern guild faced this monster when it infiltrated Akiba and then reported it to Shiroe.
Sislau (シスラウ, Shisurau)
The Genius of poison. The Nyanko Tavern guild encountered this monster before the Scale Festival took place. It had the ability to poison its victims.
Taliktan (タリクタン, Tarikutan)
The Genius of summoning. Based in Shibuya, this monster was responsible for summoning swarms of Eternal Moth monsters from the Moon which attacked the main player cities in order to harvest empathions. It changes from its original form, which has the appearance of an old man, into two other forms depending on its health level. It was the only boss in the Calling Fortress raid and was ultimately taken down by the raiding party led by Shiroe.
