= Maoyu =

Japanese light novel series by Mamare Touno

- Maoyū: Maō Yūsha
- Cover of volume 1 featuring the title characters

まおゆう魔王勇者
- Genre: Fantasy
- Light novel
- Written by: Mamare Touno
- Illustrated by: Keinojou Mizutama; toi8
- Published by: Enterbrain
- Original run: December 29, 2010 – December 22, 2012
- Volumes: 8
- Manga

Maoyū Maō Yūsha: Oka no Mukō e
- Written by: Mamare Touno
- Illustrated by: Hiro Touge
- Published by: Akita Shoten
- Magazine: Champion Red
- Original run: May 19, 2011 – August 19, 2014
- Volumes: 8
- Manga

Maoyu: Archenemy and Hero "Become Mine, Hero" "I Refuse!"
- Written by: Mamare Touno
- Illustrated by: Akira Ishida
- Published by: Kadokawa Shoten
- English publisher: Kadokawa Shoten
- Magazine: Comp Ace
- Original run: May 26, 2011 – August 26, 2016
- Volumes: 18
- Manga
- Written by: Mamare Touno
- Illustrated by: You Asami
- Published by: Enterbrain
- Magazine: Famitsu Comic Clear
- Original run: June 24, 2011 – November 11, 2016
- Volumes: 8
- Manga

Maoyū 4-Koma: Muitemasen yo, Maō-sama!
- Written by: Mamare Touno
- Illustrated by: Ronchi Nanatsumu
- Published by: Enterbrain
- Magazine: Magi-Cu Comics web
- Original run: Jun 29, 2011 – October 2, 2014
- Volumes: 3
- Manga

Maoyū Maō Yūsha Gaiden: Madoromi no Onna Mahōtsukai
- Written by: Mamare Touno
- Illustrated by: Taiki Kawakami
- Published by: Kodansha
- Magazine: Monthly Shōnen Sirius
- Original run: November 26, 2011 – March 25, 2014
- Volumes: 7
- Anime television series
- Directed by: Takeo Takahashi
- Written by: Naruhisa Arakawa
- Music by: Takeshi Hama
- Studio: Arms
- Licensed by: AUS: Madman Entertainment; NA: Sentai Filmworks; UK: Anime on Demand
- Original network: Tokyo MX, Mie Television, tvk, Sun TV, KBS, GBS, Animax
- English network: SEA: Animax Asia
- Original run: January 5, 2013 – March 30, 2013
- Episodes: 12

Maoyū: Maō Yūsha (まおゆう魔王勇者; 'Demon King and Hero'), also known as Maoyu or Archenemy and Hero in English, is a Japanese light novel series by Mamare Touno that was initially posted in a play format on the textboard 2channel in 2009. Enterbrain published five main novels in the series, in addition to three side-story novels between 2010 and 2012, selling over 450,000 copies in total. It has received several manga adaptations. A 12-episode anime adaptation by Arms aired in Japan from January 5 to March 30, 2013. The series follows the exploits of a human hero and the queen of demons who join forces to bring peace and prosperity to their war-torn world.

== Plot ==
The story is set in a world embroiled by war between Humans and Demons. The Humans' greatest warrior, the Hero (勇者, Yūsha), invades the castle of the Demon King (魔王, Maō), intent on vanquishing the leader of the Demons. Inside, the Hero discovers that the Demon King is in fact a Demon Queen; and instead of battling him, the Demon Queen proposes an alliance with the Hero. She explains how a sudden end to the war can bring further chaos to the world as the Humans, once united to stand against their common enemies, would eventually begin fighting among themselves, with similar issues already occurring in the Demon Realm. Convinced by her words, the Hero joins forces with the Queen, and together they execute a plan to bring prosperity and a lasting peace to both Humans and Demons alike.

== Production ==
=== Commercial releases ===
Game designer Shōji Masuda took note of the series and contacted the author on Twitter. This led to the establishment of a project to publish the series commercially as a novel. Masuda acted as the series' publication supervisor, with Atsushi Yamakita and Hiromi Hosoe taking on the role of setting director, Atsushi Yamakita providing extra consulting on map creation, toi8 providing illustrations, with additional character design assistance from Keinojō Mizutama. Besides the novel series, the franchise has received several manga adaptations and drama CDs and a TV anime adaptation, which was broadcast between January and March 2013.

== Media ==
=== Light novels ===
No.	Title	Release date	ISBN
01	"Become Mine, Hero" "I Refuse!" (「この我のものとなれ、勇者よ」「断る!」)	December 29, 2010	978-4-04-726933-0
02	Conspiracy of Kurultai (忽鄰塔(クリルタイ)の陰謀)	January 31, 2011	978-4-04-726994-1
03	Expeditionary force of Seiken (聖鍵(せいけん)遠征軍)	April 28, 2011	978-4-04-727097-8
04	What Can be Done With These Hands (この手でできること)	July 16, 2011	978-4-04-727098-5
Episode01	Episode1 Female Magician from Elms country (エピソード1 楡の国の女魔法使い)	October 31, 2011	978-4-04-727551-5
05	The other side of the hill (あの丘の向こうに)	January 21, 2012	978-4-04-727144-9
Episode00	Episode0 Archer from Dune country (エピソード0 砂丘の国の弓使い)	June 30, 2012	978-4-04-728095-3
Episode02	Episode2 Female Knight from Flowers country (エピソード2 花の国の女騎士)	December 22, 2012	978-4-04-728456-2

=== Manga ===
The manga series Maoyu: Archenemy and Hero "Become Mine, Hero" "I Refuse!", illustrated by Akira Ishida, was published in English digitally by Kadokawa Shoten, with the first two volumes made available on BookWalker on December 24, 2014. 16 volumes out of 18 were released. Yen Press had licensed the manga and planned to release it in a digital format, but this didn't happen.

No.	Release date	ISBN
01	August 24, 2011	978-4-04-715766-8
02	December 20, 2011	978-4-04-120054-4
03	April 24, 2012	978-4-04-120205-0
04	August 23, 2012	978-4-04-120361-3
05	December 21, 2012	978-4-04-120518-1
06	February 22, 2013	978-4-04-120577-8
07	May 23, 2013	978-4-04-120697-3
08	August 21, 2013	978-4-04-120822-9
09	December 26, 2013	978-4-04-120938-7
10	March 26, 2014	978-4-04-121047-5
11	July 26, 2014	978-4-04-101732-6
12	October 25, 2014	978-4-04-101733-3
13	January 26, 2015	978-4-04-101734-0
14	April 25, 2015	978-4-04-101735-7
15	July 25, 2015	978-4-04-102908-4
16	October 26, 2015	978-4-04-102909-1
17	February 26, 2016	978-4-04-102910-7
18	August 26, 2016	978-4-04-104685-2

=== Anime ===
A 12-episode anime television series adaptation, directed by Takeo Takahashi and produced by Arms, aired in Japan on January 5 to March 30, 2013, on Tokyo MX. The screenplay is written by Naruhisa Arakawa and the music is by Takeshi Hama. The anime is streaming by Crunchyroll with English subtitles. The opening theme song is "Headwind" (向かい風, Mukaikaze) by Yohko and the ending theme song is "Unknown Vision" by Akino Arai. Sentai Filmworks has acquired the series for a release in North America, while in Australia it is licensed by Madman Entertainment.
