= Yunchi =

Japanese singer and fashion model

- Born: May 29, 1987 (age 39)
- Occupations: Singer, fashion model
- Years active: 2012–present
- Agent: Asobi System
- Website: www.yunchi.site

Yunchi, stylized as Yun*chi (born May 29, 1987) is a Japanese singer and fashion model affiliated with Asobi System and Crown Records. She made her debut as a singer in 2012 with the release of her first mini-album Yun*chi. In 2013, she released her first single "Your Song", which was used in the anime series Log Horizon. Her first full album Asterisk was released in 2014. She has also appeared at events in Indonesia and the United Kingdom.

== Career ==
Yunchi aspired to become an entertainer early in life, a dream that was encouraged by her parents. Because of her plans of becoming an entertainer, she thought of moving to Tokyo as a primary school student and auditioning for idol groups. After deciding to become an entertainer later in life, she joined the talent agency Asobi System, the same agency as artist Kyary Pamyu Pamyu who was Yunchi's senior.

Yunchi made her music debut with the mini-album Yun*chi, which was released on November 14, 2012. The album's CD cover was awarded first prize at the 2013 Music Jacket Awards. Her next release was the mini-album Shake you was released on April 17, 2013. This was followed by her first single "Your song", which was released on November 13, 2013; the title track is used as the ending theme to the first season of the anime series Log Horizon.

Yunchi's first full album Asterisk was released on February 5, 2014, and her third mini-album Starlight was released on July 2, 2014. She made her first overseas appearance at Hyper Japan in July 2014, and she made an appearance at an anime event held by the University of Indonesia in August 2014. Her second single "Wonderful Wonder World" was released on October 22, 2014; the title track is used as the ending theme to the second season of Log Horizon. She released a mini-album of anime song covers titled Ani*yun~anime song cover~ on April 15, 2015; the album includes a cover of the song "Catch You Catch Me" by Megumi Hinata, which was originally used as the first opening theme to the anime television series Cardcaptor Sakura. Her third single "Lucky Girl" was released on July 15, 2015; the title track is used as the opening theme to the third season of the anime short Wooser's Hand-to-Mouth Life. Her second full album Pixie Dust was released on September 9, 2015. Her fourth mini-album Canvas was released on August 2, 2017.

On October 31, 2025, Yunchi was announced by GEMVOX (a joint project established by Studio Entre, Inc. and Gonzo K.K. as a record label for singers based on artificial intelligence) to be the voice provider for a pair of artificial singing vocals (or "AI Singers") named "Otobe Sapphire" and "Otobe Hisui", with Sapphire being developed for the Vocaloid 6 singing synthesis engine and Hisui for VoiSona (a VST software related to CeVIO). Sapphire was slated for release on November 4 while Hisui was projected for a December 15 release.
