= Log Horizon =

Japanese light novel series by Mamare Touno and its franchise

- Cover of the first novel volume featuring main characters (left to right) Akatsuki, Naotsugu, and Shiroe

ログ・ホライズン (Rogu Horaizun)
- Genre: Adventure; Isekai; Science fiction
- Novel series
- Written by: Mamare Touno
- Published by: Shōsetsuka ni Narō
- Original run: April 13, 2010 – March 25, 2018 (hiatus)
- Light novel
- Written by: Mamare Touno
- Illustrated by: Kazuhiro Hara; Mochichi Hashimoto (monster design)
- Published by: Kadokawa Future Publishing; Enterbrain
- English publisher: NA: Yen Press
- Original run: March 31, 2011 – March 20, 2018
- Volumes: 14
Further information
Manga
Log Horizon Gaiden: Honey Moon Logs
Written by	Mamare Touno
Illustrated by	Motoya Matsu
Published by	ASCII Media Works
Magazine	Dengeki Daioh
Original run	January 27, 2012 – June 27, 2014
Volumes	4
Manga
Written by	Mamare Touno
Illustrated by	Kazuhiro Hara
Published by	Enterbrain
English publisher	NA: Yen Press
Magazine	Famitsu Comic Clear
Original run	May 18, 2012 – June 28, 2013
Volumes	1
Manga
Log Horizon: The West Wind Brigade
Written by	Mamare Touno
Illustrated by	Koyuki
Published by	Fujimi Shobo
English publisher	NA: Yen Press
Magazine	Age Premium; Monthly Dragon Age
Original run	July 8, 2012 – March 9, 2018
Volumes	11
Manga
Log Horizon Gaiden: Nyanta-honcho Shiawase no Recipe
Written by	Mamare Touno
Illustrated by	Sōchū
Published by	Enterbrain
Magazine	Comic B's LOG
Original run	December 21, 2012 – March 31, 2018
Volumes	6
Anime television series
Directed by	Shinji Ishihira; Junichi Wada (Note: Credited as Animation Coordinator (アニメーションコーディネート).)
Produced by	Kenichirou Naeshiro
Written by	Toshizou Nemoto
Music by	Yasuharu Takanashi
Studio	Satelight
Licensed by	Crunchyroll; NA: Sentai Filmworks (expired); UK: MVM Films (expired)
Original network	NHK Educational TV
English network	AU: ABC Me; NA: Anime Network, Crunchyroll Channel
Original run	October 5, 2013 – March 22, 2014
Episodes	25
Anime television series
Log Horizon 2
Directed by	Shinji Ishihira; Toshinori Watanabe
Produced by	Kenichirou Naeshiro
Written by	Toshizou Nemoto
Music by	Yasuharu Takanashi
Studio	Studio Deen
Licensed by	Crunchyroll; NA: Sentai Filmworks (expired); UK: MVM Films (expired)
Original network	NHK Educational TV
English network	AU: ABC Me; NA: Anime Network, Crunchyroll Channel
Original run	October 4, 2014 – March 28, 2015
Episodes	25
Manga
Log Horizon: Kanami, Go! East!
Written by	Mamare Touno
Illustrated by	Kou
Published by	Enterbrain
Magazine	Comic B's LOG
Original run	October 1, 2015 – December 1, 2016
Volumes	2
Anime television series
Log Horizon: Destruction of the Round Table
Directed by	Shinji Ishihira; Toshinori Watanabe
Produced by	Kenichirou Naeshiro; Liu Junwen
Written by	Toshizou Nemoto
Music by	Yasuharu Takanashi
Studio	Studio Deen
Licensed by	Crunchyroll
Original network	NHK Educational TV
English network	AU: ABC Me
Original run	January 13, 2021 – March 31, 2021
Episodes	12
- icon

Log Horizon (Japanese: ログ・ホライズン, Hepburn: Rogu Horaizun) is a Japanese light novel series written by Mamare Touno and illustrated by Kazuhiro Hara. It began serialization online in 2010 on the user-generated novel publishing website Shōsetsuka ni Narō, being later on acquired by Enterbrain and published as a light novel in Japan since 2011. Yen Press began publishing an English translation in 2015. The series follows the strategist, Shiroe, and the other players of the long-lived MMORPG Elder Tale after they find themselves whisked away into the game world following a game update.

The novel has received four manga adaptations, with one based on the main story and the other three revolving around characters in the series. An anime television series adaptation animated by Satelight aired its first season on NHK Educational TV between October 2013 and March 2014. A second season by Studio Deen aired between October 2014 and March 2015. A third season by Studio Deen aired between January and March 2021.

== Synopsis ==
By its eleventh expansion pack, the massively multiplayer online role-playing game (MMORPG) Elder Tale (エルダー・テイル, Erudā Teiru) has become a global success, with a user base of millions of players. However, during the release of its twelfth expansion pack: Homesteading the Noosphere (ノウアスフィアの開墾, Nōasufia no Kaikon; sometimes translated as Novasphere Pioneers), thirty thousand Japanese gamers who were logged on at the time of the update suddenly find themselves transported into the virtual game world and donning their in-game avatars. In the midst of the event, a socially awkward gamer named Shiroe, along with his friends Naotsugu and Akatsuki, decide to team up so that they may face this world, which unfortunately has now become their reality, along with the challenges and obstacles ahead of them.

== Publication ==
Log Horizon began as a light novel written by Mamare Touno. It initially appeared in installments on the user-generated content site Shōsetsuka ni Narō ("So You Want to be a Novelist") starting on April 13, 2010, and subsequently published in book form by Enterbrain since March 2011. Yen Press obtained the rights on its light novel imprint to release the novels in English from 2015.

== Media ==
=== Manga ===
The novel series has received five manga adaptations, all written by Touno. The first adaptation is illustrated by Motoya Matsu and titled, Log Horizon Gaiden: Honey Moon Logs. It began serialization on January 27, 2012, and is published by ASCII Media Works in the Dengeki Daioh magazine. The second adaptation is illustrated by Kazuhiro Hara and titled Log Horizon. It began serialization on May 18, 2012, and was published by Enterbrain in the Famitsu Comic Clear web magazine. Yen Press obtained this manga for an English release. The third adaptation is illustrated by Koyuki and titled, Log Horizon: The West Wind Brigade. It began serialization on July 9, 2012, ended on March 9, 2018, and was published by Fujimi Shobo in the Age Premium magazine. Another manga illustrated by Sōchū and titled, Log Horizon Gaiden: Nyanta-honcho Shiawase no Recipe began serialization on December 21, 2012, ended on March 31, 2018, and was published by Enterbrain in the Comic B's LOG magazine and collected in six volumes. A manga Log Horizon: Kanami, Go! East! illustrated by Kou was serialized in Comic B's LOG from October 1, 2015, to December 1, 2016, and compiled in two volumes.

=== Anime ===
A 25-episode anime adaptation produced by Satelight aired its first season on NHK Educational TV from October 5, 2013, to March 22, 2014. The series was streamed as a simulcast by Crunchyroll in North America and other select parts of the world.

A 25-episode second season produced by Studio Deen aired from October 4, 2014, to March 28, 2015. Both seasons were licensed by Sentai Filmworks in North America for digital and home video release. Funimation acquired the streaming rights to the series after Sentai Filmworks lost the rights. Following Sony's acquisition of Crunchyroll, the series was moved to Crunchyroll. For both seasons, the opening theme is "Database" by Man with a Mission featuring Takuma. The ending theme for the first season is "Your Song*" and for the second season it is "Wonderful Wonder World*", both performed by Yunchi.

A 12-episode third season titled Log Horizon: Destruction of the Round Table (ログ・ホライズン 円卓崩壊, Rogu Horaizun Entaku Hōkai) was originally scheduled to premiere in October 2020, but was delayed to Winter 2021 due to the COVID-19 pandemic. The third season aired from January 13 to March 31, 2021. The third season is named after the title of Volume 12 of the web novel series. The staff and cast reprised their roles from the second season. Funimation licensed the third season and streamed it on its website in North America, the British Isles, Mexico, and Brazil, in Europe through Wakanim, and in Australia and New Zealand through AnimeLab.

==== Music ====
Theme Song Title
Lyrics	Composition	Arrangement	Vocals	Footnotes
Opening Theme
Database feat. Takuma (10-Feet)
Kamikaze Boy, Jean-Ken Johnny, Takuma	Kamikaze Boy	Man with a Mission, Kohsuke Oshima	Man with a Mission	Ep.1 - Ep.50
Ending Theme
Your Song*
Yun*chi	Hayato Tanaka	Floor on the intelligence	Yun*chi	Ep.1 - Ep.25
Wonderful Wonder World*
Yun*chi, Hidenori Tanaka	Masahiro Tobinai		Yun*chi	Ep.26 - Ep.50
Insert Song
Your Song*
Yun*chi	Hayato Tanaka	Floor on the intelligence	Isuzu (Eriko Matsui)	Ep.15, Ep.18
Wonderful Wonder World*
Yun*chi, Hidenori Tanaka	Masahiro Tobinai		Isuzu (Eriko Matsui)	Ep.16, Ep.19
Your song*
Mamare Touno	Yasuharu Takanashi	-	Isuzu (Eriko Matsui)	Ep.20, Ep.21

== Reception ==
Rebecca Silverman of the Anime News Network noted that the series has "its own unique take on what has become a subgenre of fantasy" when compared to the previous Sword Art Online and the earlier .hack series. With respect to the anime adaptation, Silverman noted that one of the major drawbacks was the artistry. She held the designs of the characters with small regard, calling them "somewhat bland and generic in design, which is a bit of an accomplishment given how many character creation options there apparently are". She used the design of Akatsuki as an example, explaining that the character's beauty has to be constantly reminded to the audience despite the fact that "she's one of the less striking female characters on screen". Another issue Silverman pointed out was the apparent overuse of Naotsugu's perverted nature for comedic relief and finding that for some viewers he may be "line-crossingly obnoxious". Despite these drawbacks, Silverman remarked that the "show shouldn't be dismissed as 'just another ripoff' before giving it a chance" since "it has the potential to expand rather than rehash the basic premise of players trapped in a game".

Writing for The Encyclopedia of Science Fiction, Piotr Konieczny described Log Horizon as one of the most politically and sociologically oriented entries in the isekai VRMMORPG subgenre. He praised the series for shifting the focus from survival and combat to governance, economics, and the creation of social institutions, arguing that it transforms MMORPG mechanics into a vehicle for exploring civilization-building rather than adventure. Konieczny also highlighted the anime's treatment of virtual worlds as spaces for examining ethics, politics, and human adaptation, comparing its emphasis on institution-building to Isaac Asimov's Foundation series. He concluded that Log Horizon helped mature game-world isekai by demonstrating that MMORPG settings could support sophisticated speculative fiction about society rather than merely individual heroism.
