= Mamare Touno =

Japanese writer

- 橙乃 ままれ
- Citizenship: Japanese
- Occupation: Novelist
- Known for: Log Horizon, Maoyū Maō Yuusha

Daisuke Umezu (Japanese: 梅津大輔, Hepburn: Umezu Daisuke), better known as Mamare Touno (橙乃ままれ, Tōno Mamare), is a Japanese author of light novels and manga. He has written the series Log Horizon and Maoyu, both of which have been adapted into anime. He is also the author of a manga series titled Trattoria After School (放課後のトラットリア, Hōkago no Trattoria).

In 2015, Touno was charged with tax evasion for reportedly violating the Corporate Tax Law. Reports claim that Tōno: "allegedly failed to file 120 million yen (around US$996,438) in royalties from the printed versions of his Maoyu and Log Horizon novels for his income tax report in a three-year period ending the previous year. According to the prosecutor's office, Touno owes the Japanese government 30 million yen (around US$249,114) in taxes". Some time after, Touno apologized to his fans and stated on his official website that he had filed his taxes, concluding the investigation.
