= 2015 in Philippine television =

The following is a list of events affecting Philippine television in 2015. Events listed include television show debuts, finales, cancellations, and channel launches, closures and rebrandings, as well as information about controversies and carriage disputes.

== Events ==
=== January ===
- January 15–19 – Major networks including ABS-CBN, PTV, TV5, GMA Network, and 9TV covered the first Papal visit to the country of Pope Francis.
- January 20 – Salmiya Makasait won the jackpot prize of one million pesos for the first time on Eat Bulaga!'s revival segment from 2000 to 2006, Laban o Bawi.
- January 24
  - Noontime show Eat Bulaga! launches its own mobile application.
  - Spyros was hailed as the first-ever PINASikat Grand Champion on It's Showtime, the grand finals of which were held at Ynares Center, Antipolo City.

=== February ===
- February 5 – HOOQ, a streaming service jointly owned by Singtel, Sony Pictures and Warner Bros., was launched and became available in the Philippines.
- February 6 - Balitanghali Weekend its celebrate 5th anniversary on Philippine television.
- February 11 – ABS-CBN Corporation formally launched its digital terrestrial television brand, ABS-CBN TV Plus, after almost 5 years of trial period.
- February 15 – Heart Evangelista and Senator Chiz Escudero tied the knot after their wedding rites in Balesin Island, Polillo, Quezon.
- February 23 – Milay Osiones won the jackpot prize of one million pesos on Eat Bulaga!'s revival segment from 2000 to 2006, Laban o Bawi.
- February 26 – Movie and Television Review and Classification Board (MTRCB), on their 30th anniversary launches their newest informercial shown in different TV stations, on the responsible viewing of television. Couple Judy Ann Santos and Ryan Agoncillo starred in the 30 sec. informercial.
- February 28 – The Game Channel, after almost 3 years on broadcasting, ceased on February 28, 2015. The channel space was taken over by My Movie Channel on March 1.

=== March ===
- March 1 – Jason Dy of Team Sarah was declared as the grand winner of the second season of The Voice of the Philippines held at the Newport Performing Arts Theater, Resorts World Manila. He was coached by Sarah Geronimo.
- March 9 – Sharon Cuneta formally returned to her original network, ABS-CBN, after a 4-year involvement with TV5. Cuneta's first major project for her return was Your Face Sounds Familiar.
- March 14:
  - Vice Ganda's look-alike (Daniel Aliermo from Davao City) wins as Ultimate Kalokalike Face 3 on It's Showtime.
  - The Ateneo de Manila University Lady Eagles clinched their back-to-back championship title in after defeating the De La Salle University Lady Spikers in game 2 of the UAAP Season 77 Women's Volleyball Finals held at the SM Mall of Asia Arena in Bay City, Pasay. This was the only team to have a perfect 16-0 record.
- March 16 – CNN Philippines was launched; prior to its launching the channel was known as 9TV. The rebranding was done after Turner Broadcasting System inked a partnership and licensing deal with Nine Media Corporation in October of last year.
- March 20 – Willie Revillame also embarked his return to GMA Network after signing their blocktime deal for the upcoming Sunday variety show, Wowowin.
- March 22 – Jack City was replaced by CT, thus becoming independent from its parent network. Upon launch, the channel broadened its programming focus by adding talk shows, sitcoms and men's lifestyle programs to its roster.
- March 23 – Bearwin Meily wins the top prize of 1 million pesos in the second revival of Kapamilya, Deal or No Deal.
- March 26 – Solar Entertainment Corporation announced its broadcast of the Fight of the Century between Manny Pacquiao and Floyd Mayweather Jr. on May 3, 2015. As stated in a press conference that day, it was broadcast on May 3 via delayed broadcast in three major television stations in the Philippines, ABS-CBN, TV5, and GMA Network (who waivered its exclusive contract with Solar to allow its multi-network coverage, but maintained its exclusive live broadcast on its radio division), with Solar Sports as its main content provider for this historic event in boxing.

=== April ===
- April 5 - Aksyon celebrated its 5th anniversary on Philippine television.
- April 10 – Comedian Ai-Ai de las Alas transferred and also embarked her return to GMA Network after 16-year involvement with ABS-CBN.
- April 17 – Ara Mina wins the top prize of 1 million pesos in the second revival of Kapamilya, Deal or No Deal.

=== May ===
- May 2 – Bobby Madubike of Abia, Nigeria was hailed as You're My Foreignoy 2015: Artistahin Talaga! Grand Winner on Eat Bulaga!.
- May 7 – Globe Telecom and The Walt Disney Company signed a multi-year partnership to access Disney's digital lifestyle experience for Globe users including video-on-demand, interactive content, promotions and other related services.
- May 14 – El Gamma Penumbra, a shadow dance troupe from Batangas who once joined Pilipinas Got Talent, won the first season of Asia's Got Talent aired on AXN Asia. Khusugtun of Mongolia and Gerphil Flores claimed their runner-up finishes.
- May 16 – University of San Carlos was hailed as Eat Bulaga!'s Pinoy Henyo High 2014-2015 Sayawan Grand Winner.
- May 18 – ABS-CBN announced a 5-year deal with the National Collegiate Athletic Association and ending its 3-year stint with TV5 to aired the games beginning with the 91st season on both free-to-air network, ABS-CBN Sports and Action, and on the cable and satellite channel, Balls and Balls HD
- May 22 – Philippines premiere cable channel for women, Lifestyle Network revealed a new logo and a new name will become Lifestyle.
- May 23
  - Xiamara Sophia Vigor (Mini Selena Gomez) hailed as the MiniMe season 2 grand winner on It's Showtime.
  - St. Vincent College of Cabuyao was hailed as Eat Bulaga!'s Pinoy Henyo High 2014-2015 Pautakan Grand Winner.
- May 27 – Iflix, a streaming service owned by Catcha Group, was launched and became available in the Philippines, alongside Malaysia.
- May 30 – Mommy Cherrie and Elche Isidro emerged as Eat Bulaga! #Kafez Grand Winner.
- May 31 – Angelia Gabrena Ong, of Manila was hailed as the 2015 Miss Philippines Earth, on its Grand Coronation Night that held at the Mall of Asia Arena.

=== June ===
- June 7 – Comedian Melai Cantiveros of General Santos (impersonated as Miley Cyrus) was named the first grand winner of Your Face Sounds Familiar: Season 1 at the Newport Performing Arts Theater, Resorts World Manila.
- June 15–16 – Former Solar News anchorwomen Nancy Irlanda and Claire Celdran both back to their respective networks, Nancy is with ANC and Claire for CNN Philippines.

=== July ===
- July 1
  - My Movie Channel ceased broadcasting. The closure was announced by Solar a day before.
  - Jennylyn Mercado was crowned for the first time as the FHM's sexiest woman for 2015. Andrea Torres, Ellen Adarna, Sam Pinto, Solenn Heussaff, were also part of the Top 5.
- July 12 – Kabayan celebrated its 5th anniversary on Philippine television.
- July 16 – The Phenomenal "KalyeSerye" (aired over Juan for All, All for Juan segment of Eat Bulaga) featuring the love story of Alden (played by Alden Richards) and Yaya Dub (played by Maine Mendoza) collectively known as "AlDub" and the intervention of Lola Nidora (played by Wally Bayola) had gathered high ratings and trending topics for EB, up against rival It's Showtime which Ryan Rems Sarita became part of the regular cast after he won the Funny Juan competition.

=== August ===
- August 3 – Bernadette Sembrano was named as the permanent anchor replacement of Korina Sanchez, as rejoins Ted Failon and Noli de Castro on TV Patrol.
- August 8 – Ryan Rems Sarita was hailed as the Funny One grand winner on It's Showtime.
- August 14 – Bela Padilla and Joyce Bernal wins the top prize of 1 million pesos in the second revival of Kapamilya, Deal or No Deal.
- August 26 – ABS-CBN Corporation president and CEO Charo Santos-Concio said that she would chair the Gala of the 43rd International Emmy Awards on November 23 in New York City. Actor Piolo Pascual accompanied her in the gala and represented one award.
- August 29 – Kenneth Medrano was hailed as Eat Bulaga!'s That's My Bae grand winner.
- August 30 – Elha Nympha, coached by Bamboo Mañalac, won the second season of The Voice Kids held at the Newport Performing Arts Theater, Resorts World Manila.

=== September ===
- September 7 – Kaye Abad and Nikki Valdez wins the top prize of 1 million pesos in the second revival of Kapamilya, Deal or No Deal.
- September 11 – TV5 Entertainment Head Wilma Galvante, formally left the station, as she formed a content provider company that produced TV shows on TV5, and other TV channels.
- September 16 – After almost 3 years ago on broadcasting, TeleAsia Filipino and TeleAsia Chinese ceased broadcasting. The closure was announced by My Pinoy TV Broadband Inc. a day before.

=== October ===
- October 3 – ABS-CBN launched a high-definition feed on Sky Cable and other cable and satellite providers. The network's newscasts and the yearly 7 Last Words special during Holy Week continued to broadcast in standard definition format until March 2018 as well as some selected movies and the Saturday morning asianovela Angel Wings also continued in standard definition format.
- October 5 – TV5 and Cignal Digital TV inked a deal with Bloomberg for the launching of Bloomberg TV Philippines, a 24/7 English business news channel.
- October 10 – Jay-R was hailed as COC - Clash of Celebrities grand winner on It's Showtime.
- October 14 – TV5 announced the appointment of VIVA CEO Vic Del Rosario Jr. as their network's chief entertainment strategist.

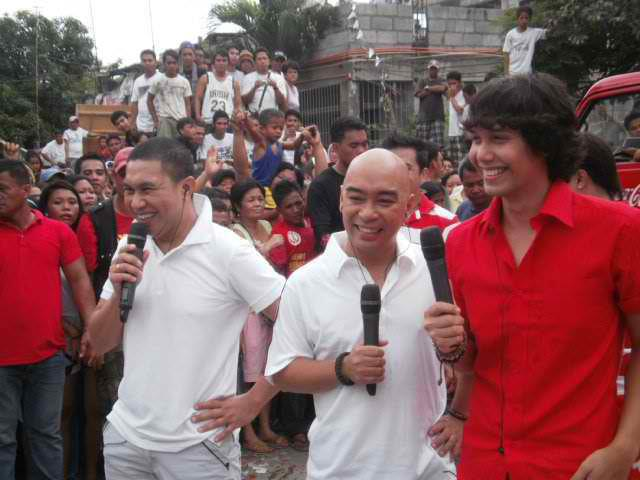
Eat Bulaga! hosts Jose Manalo, Wally Bayola and Paolo Ballesteros who performed during the "Sa Tamang Panahon" concert.

- October 17 – Team Dyosa was hailed as Lip Swak Challenge grand winner on It's Showtime held at Hoops Dome, Cebu.
- October 24
  - Eat Bulaga! held a benefit concert dubbed as "Sa Tamang Panahon" ("In the Right Time") at the Philippine Arena to raise funds for libraries in certain schools in the Philippines. With sold out tickets, the concert highlights the love team of Maine Mendoza and Alden Richards (collectively known as AlDub in the Kalyeserye portion of Eat Bulaga!) and the Twitter hashtag #ALDubEBTamangPanahon made 41 million tweets becoming the most tweeted event in the world for 2015.
  - Team Vice, Jugs and Teddy was hailed as It's Showtime's sixth anniversary (Magpasikat 2015: Happy ANIMversary!) champion.
- October 26 - ANC went into a major overhaul in its broadcast design, including the refreshed logo and the red-blue colored title cards for the channel's major newscasts. As part of the relaunch, the channel opened a new studio in 8 Rockwell in Rockwell Center in Makati, aside from their studio and newsroom in Quezon City.
- October 29 - The Letran Knights clinched the NCAA Season 91 men's basketball title after defeating their archrivals San Beda Red Lions 2–1 in winner take-all game 3 of the best-of-three finals series held at the SM Mall of Asia Arena in Bay City, Pasay. This was their 17th basketball championship title since they last won after 10 years.
- October 31
  - Names Going Wild was hailed as Halo Halloween Grand Champion on It's Showtime.
  - Ma. Katherine "Kit" Cunanan named as the grand winner of It's Showtime's That's My Tomboy Astig 2, a segment dedicated to lesbians.

=== November ===
- November 8 – Jimboy Martin and Miho Nishida were both crowned as the Big Winners of the recently concluded Pinoy Big Brother: 737. The season's big night was held at Albay Astrodome in Legazpi, Albay.
- November 12 – ABS-CBN launches the Christmas song Thank You For The Love, after the news program TV Patrol.
- November 18 – Celestial Tiger Entertainment has teamed with Viva Communications to create Celestial Movies Pinoy, a localized Philippines version of CTE's Chinese film channel Celestial Movies.

=== December ===
- December 2 – The FEU Tamaraws clinched the UAAP Season 78 men's basketball title after defeating the UST Growling Tigers 2–1 in winner take-all game 3 of the best-of-three finals series held at the SM Mall of Asia Arena in Bay City, Pasay. This was their 20th basketball championship title since they last won after 10 years.
- December 3 – ABS-CBN Corporation dominated 33 categories, including Best TV Station, in the recently concluded 29th PMPC Star Awards for Television held at the Kia Theatre.
- December 5 – Garcia Family from San Pedro, Laguna was hailed as Karoling-Galing grand winner on It's Showtime.
- December 6 – Miss Philippines Angelia Ong was named the Miss Earth 2015 in its coronation night held at the Marx Halle in Vienna, Austria, marking the first time in the pageant's nearly 15-year history that a country has won back-to-back titles.
- December 12 – Alab Poi Dancers from Abucay, Bataan was hailed as the first-ever Todo BiGay grand winner on It's Showtime.
- December 13 – Actress Denise Laurel of Manila (impersonated as Beyoncé) was named the second grand winner of Your Face Sounds Familiar: season 2 at the Newport Performing Arts Theater, Resorts World Manila.
- December 19 - Migo Adcer and Klea Pineda was hailed as StarStruck Season 6 Ultimate Male and Female Survivors.
- December 20 – Pia Alonzo Wurtzbach from the Philippines was named as Miss Universe 2015 held at the AXIS, Las Vegas, Nevada, USA.
- December 31 – After 7 years of broadcasting, Balls and Balls HD ceased on the night of New Year's Eve. Its HD channel, as well as the entire channel's content (except the Ultimate Fighting Championship which the broadcast rights was acquired by TV5's sports division Sports5) absorbed to the S+A brand on New Year's Day.

== Debuts ==
=== ABS-CBN ===
The following are programs that debuted on ABS-CBN:

- January 5: Give Love on Christmas: The Exchange Gift
- January 19: FlordeLiza, Nasaan Ka Nang Kailangan Kita and Oh My G!
- January 24: Angel Wings
- January 26: Fated to Love You (Korean version)
- February 2: Unforgettable Love
- February 9: Kapamilya, Deal or No Deal (season 5) and Mission Possible
- February 10: 3-in-1
- February 11: RealiTV
- February 12: Sports U
- March 14: Your Face Sounds Familiar (season 1)
- March 16: Bridges of Love and Inday Bote
- April 5: Teenage Mutant Ninja Turtles (season 2)
- April 6: Haikyu!! season 1 and Naruto: Shippuden season 7
- April 12: Kapamilya Mega Blockbusters
- April 20: Nathaniel
- April 27: My Lovely Girl
- May 4: Let's Get Married
- May 25: Pangako sa 'Yo
- June 1: Pasión de Amor
- June 6: The Voice Kids season 2
- June 20: Pinoy Big Brother: 737
  - June 22: Pinoy Big Brother: 737 GOLD
- July 4: The Flying House
- July 7: My Puhunan
- July 8: Red Alert
- July 27: Ningning
- August 10: On The Wings of Love
- August 17: Power Rangers Megaforce
- August 24: Doble Kara
- August 31: All of Me
- September 12: Your Face Sounds Familiar season 2
- September 26: Celebrity Playtime
- September 28: FPJ's: Ang Probinsyano and Tonight with Boy Abunda
- October 19: Walang Iwanan
- October 26: Mr. Bean: The Animated Series (season 2)
- November 9: You're My Home
- November 14: Dance Kids
- November 15: Banana Sundae
- December 7: And I Love You So
- December 26: Kapamilya Weekend Specials

==== Re-runs ====
- January 5: Dog of Flanders
- January 10: Superbook Reimagined (season 1)
- January 26: Cedie, Ang Munting Prinsipe
- February 16: Remi, Nobody's Girl
- March 21: Kung Fu Panda: Legends of Awesomeness
- April 5: The Legend of Korra
- April 19: Kuroko's Basketball season 2
- July 4: Why Not?

=== GMA ===
The following are programs that debuted on GMA Network:

- January 4: Kapuso Sine Klasika
- January 5: Fairy Tail (seasons 3 and 4) and Once Upon a Kiss
- January 12: Second Chances
- January 25: Top 20 Funniest
- January 28: Earthflight
- February 2: Corazon Indomable and Women in the Sun
- February 3: Stan Lee's Superhumans
- February 9: Kailan Ba Tama ang Mali?
- February 16: Future's Choice and The Tim Yap Show (season 6)
- February 21: Magic Kaito
- February 23: Fall in Love with Me
- March 7: Cross Fight B-Daman and The Smurfs
- March 9: Knock Out: Rising and Pari 'Koy
- March 14: Sabado Badoo
- April 5: InstaDad
- April 6: Two Mothers
- April 11: Karelasyon
- April 12: Dragon Ball Fight! Presents
- April 13: Magi: The Labyrinth of Magic
- April 15: King of Ambition
- April 19: Asia's Next Top Model (cycle 3)
- May 2: Pac-Man and the Ghostly Adventures
- May 4: Let the Love Begin and The Mermaid
- May 10: Wowowin
- May 11: Healing Hearts and The Rich Man's Daughter
- May 25: My Mother's Secret
- June 15: Birth of a Beauty
- June 29: The King's Doctor
- July 1: Pinocchio
- July 4: Angry Birds Toons (season 2) with Stella and Piggy Tales
- July 12: Alamat (season 1)
- July 16: Kalyeserye (book 1)
- July 20: Ratsada 24 Oras (GMA Iloilo)
- July 21: Biyaheng NamNam
- July 25: To the Top
- July 28: Buena Familia
- August 9: Sunday PinaSaya
- August 10: Beautiful Strangers, Home Foodie (season 1), My Faithful Husband and Reply 1997
- August 23: Juan Tamad
- August 24: Hunter × Hunter (season 2; 2011), Marimar and Toriko (season 2)
- August 31: 24 Oras Amianan (GMA Dagupan) and Legendary Women
- September 7: Starstruck season 6
- September 14: Destiny Rose
- September 19: CelebriTV
- September 21: Princess in the Palace
- October 3: Tobot (season 1)
- October 8: How the Earth Was Made
- October 22: Big History
- October 26: Dangwa
- November 2: Pokémon the Series: XY (season 17) and Someone Like You
- November 9: Kapuso Primetime Cinema
- November 16: Little Nanay
- November 23: Ice Adonis
- November 30: Because of You, Ring ni Kakero, and Shop TV
- December 14: The 700 Club Asia
- December 21: The Producers

==== Re-runs ====
- January 3: Kapuso Movie Night
- January 5: My Name is Kim Sam Soon
- March 16: My Love from the Star
- March 30: Martin Mystery
- May 18: Secret Garden
- August 3: The Master's Sun
- August 9: GMA Blockbusters
- September 28: Stairway to Heaven (2003)
- October 21: Serial Killer Earth
- November 30: GMA Christmas Cartoon Festival

=== TV5 ===
The following are programs that debuted on TV5:

- January 10: Kakaibang Lunas
- January 17: Kim Possible and Little Einsteins
- January 19: Happy Wife, Happy Life, Healing Galing sa TV, Solved na Solved and Teen Wolf season 1
- January 19: Wattpad Presents (season 2)
  - January 19: Trip in Love or Fall in Love
  - January 26: Mistakenly Meant For You
  - February 2: I'm in Love with a DOTA Player
  - February 9: A House Full of Hunks
  - February 16: Cupid Fools
  - February 23: Ex Ko ang Idol Nyo
  - March 2: BitterElla
  - March 9: My Fiance Since Birth
  - March 16: Heartbreaker
  - March 23: My Ex, My Professor
  - April 6: Lady in Disguise
  - April 13: The Magic in You
  - April 20: The Nerdy Girl Turns to a Hottie Chick
- January 23: Tropa Mo Ko Unli Spoof
- January 24: 2½ Daddies, Call Me Papa Jack and Sword Art Online,
- January 25: Mac and Chiz and Move It: Clash of the Streetdancers
- February 1: Sports 360
- February 2: Extreme Series: Kaya Mo Ba 'To?
- February 4: Agents of S.H.I.E.L.D. season 1
- February 21: YHTube
- March 6: The Vampire Diaries season 1
- March 14: Rising Stars Philippines
- March 21: 2015 PSL All-Filipino Conference
- March 23: Doc McStuffins, Higglytown Heroes, Rockman.EXE Beast and Teacher's Pet
- April 6: Showbiz Konek na Konek
- April 9: Supernatural season 1
- April 11: T3: Alliance and The Food Show: Mangaon Ta, Bai! (TV5 Cebu)
- April 20: Kenichi: The Mightiest Disciple
- April 25: Fushigi Yuugi OVA and Sword Art Online II
- April 27: Wattpad Presents (season 3)
  - April 27: Lala Laitera
  - May 4: Marry You
  - May 11: Sky: My Robot Prince
  - May 18: Hot or Cold
  - May 25: How To Break With The Bad Boy?
  - June 1: Maid For Korean Boys
  - June 8: Secretly in a Relationship with a Gangster
  - June 22: Jenny and the Magic Arinola
  - June 29: Said I Love You
- May 3: Let's Do Business (TV5 Cebu and TV5 Davao)
- May 10: Who Wants to Be a Millionaire? (season 14)
- May 11: Teen Wolf season 2 and The Medyo Late Night Show with Jojo A.
- May 18: Baker King
- May 24: CineFilipino
- May 27: Supernatural season 2
- June 6: Dare The Younghusbands
- June 14: Happy Truck ng Bayan
- June 15: Hi-5 Philippines
- June 21: Tara Na! Suroy Suroy Ta! (TV5 Cebu)
- June 29: Teen Wolf season 3
- July 5: No Harm, No Foul
- July 11: #ParangNormal Activity, KISPinoy: The K-Pop Philippination and LolaBasyang.com,
- July 20: Wattpad Presents (season 4)
  - July 20: Unwanted Girlfriend
  - August 3: I'm 20 but still NBSB
  - August 10: Pristine Academy
  - August 24: Take It or Leave It
  - August 31: Bebeng Pabebe meets Super Jiro
  - September 7: Cassanova Love Game
  - September 14: My Chinito
  - September 28: Ang Mahiwagang Bra ni Lola
- July 31: Supernatural season 3
- August 2: Nike Rise
- August 9: Misterless Misis
- August 16: Kwentong Gilas (season 3)
- August 24: Supernatural Supernatural season 4
- August 31: Randy Cunningham: 9th Grade Ninja
- September 5: Kano Luvs Pinay and Little Einsteins
- September 6: Jinrilationships, Rio Olympics Countdown and Tanods
- September 14: My Fair Lady, The Looney Tunes Show and Tom & Jerry Show
- October 3: Word of God Network
- October 5: Amachan and Hallo Hallo Café
- October 10: 2015 PSL Grand Prix Conference and Politics for Beginners
- October 19: Julie's ChiefBaker – Student Edition (season 2) (TV5 Cebu and TV5 Davao)
- October 21: Mga Kalag na Yabag (TV5 Cebu) and Sports 360 Blitz
- October 26: Wattpad Presents (season 5)
  - October 26: Beauty and the Beks
  - November 2: Were Married
  - November 9: A Rose Between Two Thorns
  - November 16: Love Encounters
  - November 23: Wicked Ways
  - November 30: Wrong Number
  - December 6: Iska Ispiritista
  - December 14: The Ignorant Princess
  - December 28: The K-Pop Star and I
- November 8: Alagang Kapatid and MasterChef Asia
- November 16: Star Wars: The Clone Wars
- November 21: Star Wars Rebels
- November 29: Barangay Utakan
- December 7: Transformers: Prime
- December 13: Manny Pacquiao Presents: Blow by Blow

==== Re-runs ====
- January 12: Phineas and Ferb
- January 20: Hi-5^{6} and Rockman.EXE Axess^{4}
- January 24: Fushigi Yuugi^{2}, Magical DoReMi^{2} and Street Fighter II V^{1}^{2}
- March 23: Transformers: Animated^{2}^{4}
- May 4: Avengers Assemble^{3}, Phineas and Ferb and X-Men^{1}
- May 9: Ben 10 (2005)^{5} and Johnny Bravo^{2}
- June 20: Henry Hugglemonster and Sofia the First (season 1)
- July 2: Kenichi: The Mightiest Disciple
- July 13: Kim Possible^{1} and Teacher's Pet
- July 25: Sword Art Online
- August 1: Stitch!
- August 2: Fushigi Yuugi^{2}
- August 10: Jake and the Never Land Pirates
- August 17: Hulk and the Agents of S.M.A.S.H.
- September 7: Agents of S.H.I.E.L.D. season 1 and The Vampire Diaries season 1
- September 14: Scooby-Doo! Mystery Incorporated^{2}
- September 21: Handy Manny
- September 23: Teen Wolf season 1
- October 3: Doc McStuffins and Higglytown Heroes
- October 5: Madam Chairman
- October 8: Supernatural (seasons 1 to 4)
- November 8: Cool Guys, Hot Ramen

Notes
^ ^{1} Originally aired on ABS-CBN
^ ^{2} Originally aired on GMA
^ ^{3} Originally aired on S+A
^ ^{4} Originally aired on Q (now GMA News TV)
^ ^{5} Originally aired on RPN (now CNN Philippines)
^ ^{6} Originally aired on IBC

=== PTV ===
- January 21: 2014 Shakey's Girls V-League of Champions
- March 22: Green&Fab
- April 6: Bridging Boarders and Filsports Basketball Association
- April 7: PLDT Home Ultera Spiker's Turf Open Conference
- April 11: At The Top (Uno Premier)
- April 13: KWATRObersyal
- April 19: TSAS (The Sunday Afternoon Show)
- April 27: Public Eye
- May 18: Shop Japan: Oaklawn Home Shopping
- June 23: Iskoolmates
- July 4: Alagang Magaling
- August 10: TV Shop Philippines
- August 29: Shakey's Girls V-League Season 13 NCR Leg
- September 25: Kapihan sa Media ng Bayan
- October 5: Bara Bara Anything Goes
- November 23: 2015 Shakey's Girls V-League of Champions
- November 26: Who's Calling?
- December 11: Motorsiklo News Talk Show
- December 21: SGVL International Championship

==== Unknown (dates) ====
- April: Tropang Teens Unlimited (PTV 8 Legazpi)

=== IBC ===
The following are programs that debuted on IBC:

- January 4: Family TV Mass
- January 5: TV Shop Philippines
- May 11: EZBuy
- July 4: Showbiz Unlimited
- August 2: CESAFI Season 15 Men's Basketball
- September 5: NAASCU Season 15
- September 25: Kapihan sa Media ng Bayan
- October 18: ABP Touchdown: Philippine Tackle Football League

=== Minor networks ===
The following are programs that debuted on minor networks:

- January 12: Agila Balita Morning Edition on Net 25
- January 19: Arangkada Na on UNTV
- January 26: Masayang Umaga Po! on Net 25
- February 2: Why News on UNTV
- February 14: Living in Style on CLTV 36
- February 28: Ten-4 Para Sa Pilipino on Net 25
- March 1: TV Shop Philippines on BEAM TV
- March 7: InstaChika on CLTV 36
- March 9: Shop Japan: Oaklawn Home Shopping on BEAM TV
- March 10: What's Cooking? on CLTV 36
- March 14: The Janice Hung Show on Net 25
- March 16: Opinyong Legal on CLTV 36
- April 25: Pasikatan: CLTV 36 Talent Search on CLTV 36
- May 4: A Woman's Word, Big Love and La Madrasta on BEAM TV
- May 4: ASOP By Request and KaTaxpayer Ako! on UNTV
- May 10: The Teacher Is In on CLTV 36
- May 15: Luid ka, Pampanga! on CLTV 36
- June 20: KaJam TV on CLTV 36
- June 20: River of Worship on Light Network
- June 22: Homework on Net 25
- June 23: Metro Business on CLTV 36
- June 25: Spot Report on CLTV 36
- June 25: Jam: Positive Music, Positive You on Light Network
- July 24: Nice1 on CLTV 36
- August 12: OrganiqueTV on Light Network
- August 16: Hashtag Pinoy: 'Yan Tayo Eh! on Light Network
- August 16: MTRCB Uncut on Net 25
- August 22: Cine Bataan on CLTV 36
- August 30: UNTV Cup (season 4) on UNTV Life
- September 5: Ignite Gospel Music Festival: University Edition (season 3) on Light Network
- September 11: I-Vote on CLTV 36
- September 26: The Noel Jusay Lacsamana Show on CLTV 36
- October 19: Love Spell on BEAM TV
- November 2: EZ Shop on Net 25
- November 7: Math Magaling on Net 25
- November 16: Daily Chikahan on CLTV 36
- November 23: Muchacha Italiana on BEAM TV
- December 4: Plataporma: CLTV 36 Candidates Forum on CLTV 36
- December 15: 911-UNTV on UNTV Life
- December 20: A Musical Moment on CLTV 36

==== Unknown dates ====
- June: Mis-En-Scene and Tadhana on CLTV 36
- October: AUF Reel on CLTV 36
- November: NHK Japan Hour on Net 25
- November: A Day in a Life of... on UNTV Life
- Tagis Lakas on CLTV 36
- DW News on Net 25

=== Other channels ===
The following are programs that debuted on other channels:

- January 1: Leviathan The Last Defense on Hero
- January 5: Kapitolyo Para Sa Tao (season 2) on Broadkast Southern Tagalog-Channel 6 Lucena
- January 5: American Dad! season 10 and Bob's Burgers season 5 on Jack TV
- January 6: Parenthood season 6 on 2nd Avenue
- January 8: Winners & Losers season 2 on 2nd Avenue
- January 8: American Idol season 14 on ETC
- January 8: Empire season 1 on Jack TV
- January 9: The League (season 6) on TGC (now defunct)
- January 10: Glee season 6 on ETC and Jack TV
- January 15: The Mindy Project (season 3) and Web Therapy season 3 on 2nd Avenue
- January 16: Hart of Dixie season 4 on 2nd Avenue
- January 16: Chicago Fire season 3 and Law & Order: Special Victims Unit season 13 on Jack City (now CT)
- January 16: Weekend Warriors on MyTV Cebu
- January 17: Sons of Anarchy season 7 on Jack City (now CT)
- January 17: Kool Trip: Backpackers Edition on S+A
- January 19: Barasu on Jeepney TV
- January 21: A Bryk at a Time and Big Spring Clean on 2nd Avenue
- January 25: House season 8 on Jack City (now CT)
- January 29: The Americans season 3 on CT
- January 31: Fil It Up on GMA News TV
- February 5: Kristie's Fill Your House for Free on 2nd Avenue
- February 5: One Week Friends on Hero
- February 6: Myx Studio Sessions on Myx
- February 7: He's Beautiful (Japanese version) on Jeepney TV
- February 8: The Before and After on Jeepney TV
- February 9: Winners & Losers season 3 on 2nd Avenue
- February 9: Ginebra San Miguel's Ganadong Pinoy on 9TV (now CNN Philippines)
- February 9: The Walking Dead season 5 on Fox Philippines
- February 12: Ultimate Rush on S+A
- February 14: Fukuoka Love Stories on Jeepney TV
- February 15: Sports U on S+A
- February 16: Chicago P.D. season 2 and Warehouse 13 season 4 on Jack City (now CT)
- February 21: Luv U Pet on GMA News TV
- February 23: Asuko March on Jeepney TV
- February 24: The Voice season 8 on AXN Asia
- February 25: The Amazing Race 26 on AXN Asia
- February 25: Hakuoki (season 3) on Hero
- February 26: Survivor: Worlds Apart on Jack TV
- February 28: Shop Japan: Oaklawn Home Shopping on AksyonTV
- February 28: Covert Affairs (season 5) on Jack City (now CT)
- March 1: Celebrity Apprentice season 7 on Lifestyle
- March 2: Project Runway season 12 on ETC
- March 2: The Last Man on Earth on Jack TV
- March 3: The Following season 3 on CT
- March 5: Toaru Kagaku no Railgun S on Hero
- March 6: Partners By Blood on Jeepney TV
- March 7: Word of Truth on INCTV
- March 9: It's Always Sunny in Philadelphia season 10 on Jack TV
- March 11: Log Horizon season 1 on Hero
- March 12: Asia's Got Talent on AXN Asia
- March 13: Top Chef season 12 on ETC
- March 15: Life Rocks on GMA News TV
- March 15: Please Eat This on Jeepney TV
- March 16: CNN Philippines Network News, CNN Philippines Nightly News and Updates on CNN Philippines
- March 17: Erin Burnett OutFront, Reliable Sources, The Daily Share and The Lead with Jake Tapper on CNN Philippines
- March 18: CNN Go on CNN Philippines
- March 20: Global Conversations and Profiles on CNN Philippines
- March 21: 2015 PSL All-Filipino Conference on AksyonTV and Solar Sports
- March 21: Weekend Express on CNN Philippines
- March 21: Touchdown with Ken Alfonso on GMA News TV
- March 21: Wheels TV on S+A
- March 22: Best Bars in America, Car Matchmaker, CT Exclusive, CT Premiere, Ground Floor (season 1) and The Tonight Show Starring Jimmy Fallon on CT
- March 24: Inside the Actors Studio on My Movie Channel
- March 26: Swordsman on TeleAsia Filipino
- March 27: The Millionaire Matchmaker (season 6) on 2nd Avenue
- March 28: Gameday Weekend (season 3) on Balls and S+A
- March 28: Kobato. on Yey!
- March 30: Mr Selfridge on My Movie Channel
- March 31: About a Boy (season 2) and Brooklyn Nine-Nine season 2 on Jack TV
- April 1: Fate/kaleid liner Prisma Illya (season 2) on Hero
- April 5: Made in Jersey on Fox TV Philippines
- April 6: Royal Pains (season 6) on CT
- April 7: First Wives' Club on TeleAsia Filipino
- April 8: iZombie (season 1) and Project Runway: Threads on ETC
- April 12: Tiny Kitchen on GMA News TV
- April 13: My Crazy Love on ETC
- April 13: Game of Thrones season 5 on HBO Asia
- April 13: Abyss of Passion on Telenovela Channel
- April 15: Great Continental Railway Journeys on 2nd Avenue
- April 15: Log Horizon season 2 on Hero
- April 16: Knife Fight (season 2) on 2nd Avenue
- April 16: The G.O.A.T. on Fox Sports 1
- April 18: Psych season 7 on CT
- April 18: Monster Jam on S+A
- April 19: MyHome Today (season 3) on GMA News TV
- April 19: Salem season 2 on Jack TV
- April 20: Rubí (2004) on Telenovela Channel
- April 25: Something to Chew On (season 3) on CNN Philippines
- April 25: Asia's Next Top Model (cycle 3) on GMA News TV
- April 26: Drive (season 2) on CNN Philippines
- April 28: Madam Secretary season 1 on 2nd Avenue
- April 30: Miss Rose on TeleAsia Filipino
- May 2: DZRH Executive Session on DZRH News Television
- May 2: The Jamie Kennedy Experiment (season 2) on Jack TV
- May 5: Love Live! School Idol Project (season 2) on Hero
- May 7: No Ordinary Woman on S+A
- May 11: American Odyssey on CT
- May 13: Total Divas (season 2) on E!
- May 15: Louie season 4, Man Seeking Woman, Parks and Recreation season 7 and The Comedians on Jack TV
- May 16: Kool Trip: The Best of the Best Edition (season 2) on S+A
- May 17: TravelNowTV on GMA News TV
- May 18: Valiant Love on Telenovela Channel
- May 22: Mulaney and Sirens (season 2) on Jack TV
- May 24: Gotham on CT
- May 24: Man Up on S+A
- May 26: At This Hour on CNN Philippines
- May 30: Mommy Hacks on CNN Philippines
- May 30: #MichaelAngelo (season 2) on GMA News TV
- May 31: Yu-Gi-Oh! Zexal season 2 on Yey!
- June 1: Traffic Center on CNN Philippines
- June 3: Girlfriends' Guide to Divorce on 2nd Avenue
- June 3: Pretty Little Liars season 6 on ETC
- June 4: Eye Candy on ETC
- June 6: Ground Floor (season 2) on CT
- June 6: My Family Forever on GNN 44 Pampanga
- June 6: RX Plus Health, Lifestyle and Leisure on S+A
- June 7: Women's National Basketball Association on S+A
- June 8: Haikyu!! season 1 on Hero
- June 13: CNN Philippines Network News Weekend and CNN Philippines Weekend Updates on CNN Philippines
- June 14: How I Rock It and Lucky Bastards on CT
- June 14: Project Runway Philippines season 4 on ETC
- June 16: Beauty & the Beast season 3 on ETC
- June 17: Tyrant (season 2) on CT
- June 18: Ronda Brigada on Brigada News TV 46
- June 18: Rectify on CT
- June 19: Complications on CT
- June 19: The Fashion Fund (season 2) on ETC
- June 20: Chasing Life on Lifestyle
- June 20: Pinay Cruisers on S+A
- June 22: Pasión de Amor on Cine Mo!
- June 23: Pinoy Big Brother: 737 Online on Jeepney TV
- June 25: Suits season 5 on Jack TV
- June 26: Graceland (season 3) on CT
- June 27: Colgate Total: Talk Success and The Game Changers on ANC
- June 28: Undercover Boss Canada (season 2) on CNN Philippines
- June 29: Lovelife sa Baynte on CCTN 47
- July 3: The Millionaire Matchmaker (season 7) on 2nd Avenue
- July 4: URCC on Solar Sports
- July 6: Selfie on ETC
- July 8: MasterChef U.S. season 8 on Lifestyle
- July 9: Prime Suspect USA on CT
- July 11: Downton Abbey season 5 on Lifestyle
- July 12: Bates Motel season 3 on Jack TV
- July 13: The Strain (season 2) on CT
- July 14: Sicily Unpacked on 2nd Avenue
- July 14: Allegiance on CT
- July 17: Sport Science on GMA News TV
- July 18: Brew Dogs, Skin Wars, Street Art Throwdown, Tattoos After Dark and The Art of... on Jack TV
- July 18: The Voice Kids season 2 and Tears to Tiara on Yey!
- July 19: The Messengers on Jack TV
- July 20: Chef Next Door on Lifestyle
- July 21: Cockpihan on Pinoy Xtreme
- July 22: Chicken Talk on Pinoy Xtreme
- July 23: The Millers (season 2) on 2nd Avenue
- July 23: Curiosity Got The Chef (season 5) on Lifestyle
- July 24: Satisfaction on 2nd Avenue
- July 27: It Takes Gutz to be a Gutierrez (season 3) and Stylist, Inc. on E!
- July 29: Bakbakan Na on Pinoy Xtreme
- July 31: Candidly Nicole (season 2) on ETC
- August 3: Crosstalk on Brigada News TV 46
- August 3: Secret Lives of Super Rich on Lifestyle
- August 3: Late Late Show with James Corden on RTL CBS Entertainment
- August 4: The Good Cook on Lifestyle
- August 8: Myx Olympics (season 3) on Myx
- August 9: Weekend Fix on CT
- August 9: Healthcetera on GMA News TV
- August 9: Myx Throwback on Myx
- August 10: Motive (season 2) on CT
- August 11: The Mentalist season 6 on CT
- August 14: Hollywood Girls Night on Lifestyle
- August 15: The Odd Couple on CT
- August 15: Home Foodie (season 1) and OrganiqueTV on GMA News TV
- August 17: Saturday Night Live season 40 on Jack TV
- August 19: Open Mike on MyTV Cebu
- August 19: Anthony Bourdain: No Reservations on 2nd Avenue
- August 20: Hashtag Pinoy: Yan Tayo Eh! on GMA News TV
- August 20: Akame ga Kill! on Hero
- August 22: Northbound on ANC
- August 23: Ride N' Seek Philippines on History Channel Asia
- August 28: Bakuman on TeleAsia Filipino
- August 29: Single/Single: A PhilStar TV Miniseries on Cinema One
- August 29: Bogart Case Files: On the Job (season 2) on CNN Philippines
- August 31: Daily Quiapo TV Mass on TV Maria
- September 1: Market Edge on ANC
- September 1: Brunch @ Bobby's (season 5) on Lifestyle
- September 3: Devil Survivor 2: The Animation on Hero
- September 3: F Word Out Loud on Lifetime Asia
- September 4: Folktales from Japan on Hero
- September 5: Tripinas on GMA News TV
- September 6: Man-Up (season 2) and Upfront at the UAAP on S+A
- September 7: Real Talk on CNN Philippines
- September 9: The Ellen DeGeneres Show season 13 on 2nd Avenue
- September 10: The Late Show with Stephen Colbert on RTL CBS Entertainment
- September 13: Leading Women on CNN Philippines
- September 16: Merry Berry Cooks on Lifestyle
- September 17: Etcetera (season 6) on ETC
- September 19: What I See (season 3) on CNN Philippines
- September 19: Doowee Hooper and Beatband Competition (season 2) on S+A
- September 20: Made in Italy on Lifestyle
- September 21: INC Radio Bulletin, INConnections and Masayang Tahanan sa INCRadio on INCTV
- September 22: The Voice season 9 on AXN Asia
- September 22: Minority Report and The Big Bang Theory season 9 on Jack TV
- September 23: Yowamushi Pedal on Hero
- September 23: Scream Queens on ETC
- September 24: The Middle season 7 on 2nd Avenue
- September 24: Rosewood on CT
- September 24: Empire season 2 and Survivor: Cambodia on Jack TV
- September 25: Heroes Reborn on Jack TV
- September 26: Cold Case season 4, House season 5, The Mentalist season 2, White Collar season 5 and Without a Trace season 5 on Fox TV Philippines
- September 26: Legally B on GMA News TV
- September 26: Train Like A Cheerleader on Lifestyle
- September 27: Bones season 9 on Fox TV Philippines
- September 28: Bob's Burgers season 6, Brickleberry (season 3), Family Guy season 15, The Last Man on Earth (season 2), The Simpsons season 27 and Undateable (season 2) on Jack TV
- September 28: The Lady from Vendaval on Telenovela Channel
- September 30: Life in Pieces and Modern Family season 2 on 2nd Avenue
- September 30: Significant Mother and The Grinder on CT
- September 30: Let's Eat on Lifestyle
- October 1: Ellen's Design Challenge on 2nd Avenue
- October 2: Bones season 11 on CT
- October 3: Defiance (season 3) on Jack TV
- October 4: FPJ: Hari ng Aksyon on Cine Mo!
- October 5: First Up, Top 5, In The Loop and Thought Leaders on Bloomberg TV Philippines
- October 5: Project Runway All Stars season 3 on ETC
- October 6: The Mysteries of Laura (season 2) on 2nd Avenue
- October 7: Political Capital on Bloomberg TV Philippines
- October 7: Dig on CT
- October 7: E! Philippines Top 5 on E!
- October 7: The Flash season 2 on ETC and Jack TV
- October 8: Bright Ideas on Bloomberg TV Philippines
- October 8: Arrow season 4 on Jack TV
- October 9: Jamie's 15-Minute Meals on 2nd Avenue
- October 9: Bloomberg Best on Bloomberg TV Philippines
- October 9: Dracula, The Originals season 3 and The Vampire Diaries season 7 on ETC
- October 10: 2015 PSL Grand Prix Conference on AksyonTV and Solar Sports
- October 10: Angel season 4, Gossip Girl season 2, Smallville season 7 and Veronica Mars season 3 on Fox TV Philippines
- October 10: American Horror Story: Hotel on Jack TV
- October 11: 24 season 7, 90210 season 10, Buffy the Vampire Slayer season 7, Ghost Whisperer season 5, Numbers season 6, One Tree Hill season 5 and The Unit season 4 om Fox TV Philippines
- October 12: Pilipinas Commercial Basketball League on AksyonTV
- October 12: Reign season 3 on ETC
- October 12: Free! (season 1) on Hero
- October 12: The Thorn Birds on Jeepney TV
- October 15: Project Runway: Under The Gunn on ETC
- October 16: Karelasyon on GMA News TV
- October 18: Z Nation on Jack TV
- October 20: iZombie (season 2) on ETC
- October 26: News Now @ 5am, Mornings @ ANC, Market Edge News Now @ 10am and The Daily Serve on ANC
- October 26: Brigada Connection on Brigada News TV 46
- October 27: Supergirl season 1 on ETC and Jack TV
- October 28: Boys Off The Record on CNN Philippines
- October 28: Usapang Bayan ni George Chua on GNN
- October 29: Dayaw on ANC
- October 31: Grimm season 5 on Jack TV
- November 1: Myx Moods on Myx
- November 2: Trabaho Lang! on AksyonTV
- November 2: Sex & Drugs & Rock & Roll (season 1) on Jack TV
- November 2: Nail'd It on Lifestyle
- November 3: Legends (season 3) on CT
- November 3: Shop TV on ETC
- November 3: Ultimate Countdown on Lifestyle
- November 5: Alagang Kapatid sa Radyo5 on AksyonTV
- November 5: Martha Stewart Cooking School (season 4) on Lifestyle
- November 6: Elementary (season 4) on CT
- November 7: Fringe season 7 on Fox TV Philippines
- November 9: Monday Mornings on CT
- November 9: Bodacious Space Pirates on Hero
- November 12: Chaika - The Coffin Princess on Hero
- November 14: Shake on ANC
- November 15: My Hero Nation (season 6) on Hero
- November 18: Beyond Sport Philippines on Basketball TV
- November 19: Faking It season 1 and Finding Carter (season 1) on ETC
- November 21: #MichaelAngelo (season 3) on GMA News TV
- November 21: Back to the Movies on Jeepney TV
- November 21: Made in Chelsea (season 8) on Lifestyle
- November 21: Kaya Mo Bang: The Fudgee Barr Adventures (season 6) on S+A
- November 28: Church News Kids Edition on INCTV
- November 30: 2 Broke Girls season 5 on ETC
- November 30: Alpha Dogs and Drowning City on Fox Filipino
- November 30: Halfworlds on HBO Asia
- December 1: Insight on Bloomberg TV Philippines
- December 1: Christmas From The Heart 2015 on SMNI
- December 4: Free! (season 2) and Initial D: Fifth Stage on Hero
- December 5: Dance Kids on Yey!
- December 6: Crissa Campus Dance Synergy Year 10 and Ego Supreme Crew Wars Year 2 on S+A
- December 7: Mission Possible on DZMM TeleRadyo
- December 8: My Puhunan on DZMM TeleRadyo
- December 9: Red Alert on DZMM TeleRadyo
- December 10: Sports U on DZMM TeleRadyo
- December 11: Tapatan ni Tunying on DZMM TeleRadyo
- December 12: MoneyWise on CNN Philippines
- December 15: Kuroko's Basketball season 3 on Hero
- December 16: Chaika: The Coffin Princess: Avenging Battle on Hero
- December 20: In Her Shoes on 2nd Avenue
- December 21: The Great Christmas Light Fight (season 1) on 2nd Avenue
- December 21: Shop TV on GMA News TV
- December 22: The Amazing Food Challenge: Fun in the Philippines (season 3) on Asian Food Channel
- December 22: Cash Cab Philippines on AXN Asia
- December 26: Tastemony on TV Maria
- December 26: Yu-Gi-Oh! 5D's season 2 on Yey!

==== Unknown dates ====
- January: Activate: Trade and Talent Show on SLBN
- April–May: Pacific Drift, Sparta, The Best of Liga Pilipinas, Turf TV, World Poker Tour and Xtreme Riders on Pinoy Xtreme
- May: IndieKalibre on GMA News TV
- May: INC Vision on INCTV
- October: Game Changer Philippines on S+A

==== Re-runs ====
- January 5: Hiram on Jeepney TV^{1}
- January 6: Voltron Force on S+A^{1}
- January 7: Tai Chi Chasers on Hero^{4}
- January 8: Power Rangers RPM on Hero^{1}^{4}^{7}
- January 12: The One Who Couldn't Love on Telenovela Channel
- January 12: Superbook Classic on Yey!^{1}^{2}
- January 13: Top Chef season 11 on TGC
- January 14/December 25: Naruto: Shippuden season 6 on Hero^{1}
- January 19: Atlantika on Fox Filipino^{2}
- January 19: Maria Flordeluna on Jeepney TV^{1}
- January 19: Kōtetsu Sangokushi on TeleAsia Filipino
- January 20: Kuroko's Basketball season 2 on Hero^{1}
- January 27: Return of the Wife on TeleAsia Filipino^{2}
- January 31: Alice Bungisngis and Her Wonder Walis on GMA News TV^{2}
- February 11: High Kick! on TeleAsia Filipino^{3}
- February 11: Little Battlers Experience and Tai Chi Chasers on Yey!^{7}
- February 16: Walang Hanggan on Jeepney TV^{1}
- February 16: La Madrasta on Telenovela Channel
- February 19: Rockman.EXE Axess on TeleAsia Filipino^{3}^{8}
- February 22: Super Inggo at ang Super Tropa on Hero^{1}
- February 23: Luna Mystika on Fox Filipino^{2}
- March 2: Amaya on GMA News TV^{2}
- March 8: Your Song: Boystown on Jeepney TV^{1}
- March 9: Digimon Adventure on Hero^{1}
- March 16: Hakuoki (seasons 1 and 2) on Hero
- March 16: Goin' Bulilit Classics (Year 2) on Jeepney TV^{1}
- March 23: Adik Sa'Yo^{2} and It Started with a Kiss 2^{1}^{2} on Fox Filipino
- March 23/December 5: Power Rangers Operation Overdrive on Hero^{1}
- March 23: Two Wives (2014) on Jeepney TV^{1}
- March 25: Growing Up on Jeepney TV^{1}
- March 28: Eyeshield 21 (season 3) on Hero^{1}
- April 6: Magkaribal on Jeepney TV^{1}
- April 7: Gadget Boy on TeleAsia Filipino^{2}
- April 8: My Giant Friend on Yey!^{1}
- April 11: Tokyo Majin on TeleAsia Filipino^{3}
- April 12: Glass Castle on TeleAsia Filipino^{3}
- April 13: Panahon Ko 'to!: Ang Game Show ng Buhay Ko on Jeepney TV^{1}
- April 16: Love Live! School Idol Project (season 1) on Hero
- April 18: Rooftop Prince on Jeepney TV^{1}
- April 20: Magdusa Ka^{2} and The Fierce Wife^{1} on Fox Filipino
- April 22: Masked Rider Hibiki on TeleAsia Filipino^{2}
- April 24: Heaven's Dragon on TeleAsia Filipino
- April 27: Kung Tayo'y Magkakalayo on Jeepney TV^{1}
- April 29: Digimon Tamers on Hero^{1}
- May 4: Baywatch (season 3) on Jeepney TV^{1}^{7}
- May 7: Special A on TeleAsia Filipino^{3}
- May 10: Cinderella's Stepsister on TeleAsia Filipino^{1}
- May 11: Kuroko's Basketball season 1 on Yey!^{1}
- May 18: Grazilda and The Last Prince on Fox Filipino^{2}
- May 23: America's Next Top Model season 14 on Lifestyle^{6}
- May 25: Momay on Jeepney TV^{1}
- May 29: The Prince of Tennis on Teleasia Filipino^{8}
- May 31: Battle Spirits on TeleAsia Filipino^{3}
- June 1: Legend of the Seeker (season 2) on S+A
- June 3: Baywatch (season 4) on Jeepney TV^{1}^{7}
- June 4: Good Wife, Bad Wife^{3} and The Legend of Bruce Lee^{8} on TeleAsia Filipino
- June 7: Cool Guys, Hot Ramen on TeleAsia Filipino^{3}
- June 9: Masked Rider 555 on TeleAsia Filipino^{2}
- June 9: Max Steel (season 1) on Yey!^{1}
- June 10: Spirits on Jeepney TV^{1}
- June 11: Toda Max on Jeepney TV^{1}
- June 12: Pepito Manaloto on Fox Filipino^{2}
- June 15: Trigun on Hero^{2}
- June 28: Love You a Thousand Times on TeleAsia Filipino^{3}
- June 29: Munting Heredera on Fox Filipino^{2}
- July 1: Zero Hour on S+A
- July 3: Baywatch (season 5) on Jeepney TV^{7}
- July 4: Maligno on Jeepney TV^{1}
- July 6: Sa Piling Mo on Jeepney TV^{1}
- July 8: Digimon Adventure 02 on Hero^{1}
- July 10: Inazuma Eleven season 1 on Hero^{1}
- July 12: Pinoy Big Brother Revisited: Teen Edition (season 1) on Jeepney TV^{1}
- July 13: Hitman Reborn! (seasons 1 and 2) and Kuroko's Basketball (season 1) on Hero^{1}
- July 13: Angelito: Batang Ama and Princess Hours on Jeepney TV^{1}
- July 14/October 30: Eyeshield 21 (season 1) on Hero^{1}^{7}
- July 16: Jewel in the Palace on TeleAsia Filipino^{2}^{8}
- July 20: Fated to Love You (Taiwanese version) on Fox Filipino^{2}
- July 21: Rockman.EXE Beast on TeleAsia Filipino^{3}
- July 22: What's for Dinner? on TeleAsia Filipino^{3}
- July 23: Black & White on TeleAsia Filipino^{3}
- July 25: Digimon Xros Wars on Hero
- July 27: Mara Clara (2010) on Jeepney TV^{1}
- July 29: Shaider on TeleAsia Filipino^{1}^{2}^{10}
- July 31: Ryukendo on Disney Channel^{2}
- August 3: Naruto: Shippuden season 7 on Hero^{1}
- August 14: Power Rangers Samurai on Hero^{1}^{7}
- August 15: Rockman.EXE Beast Plus on TeleAsia Filipino^{3}
- August 16: Yu-Gi-Oh! Zexal season 1 on Yey!^{1}^{4}
- August 17: Ina, Kapatid, Anak and Pilipinas, Game Ka Na Ba? on Jeepney TV^{1}
- August 17: Time Between Dog and Wolf on TeleAsia Filipino^{3}
- August 18: Kuroko's Basketball (season 2) on Hero^{1}
- August 19: Bride of the Century on TeleAsia Filipino^{3}
- August 22: Guns and Roses on Jeepney TV^{1}
- August 24: A Gentleman's Dignity on Jeepney TV^{1}
- August 25: Eyeshield 21 (season 1) on Yey!^{1}^{7}
- August 31: Sugo on Fox Filipino^{2}
- August 31: Ohlala Couple on Jeepney TV^{1}
- August 31: Dog of Flanders on Yey!^{1}^{8}
- September 5: Digimon Adventure on Yey!^{1}
- September 6: Ang Munting Paraiso on Jeepney TV^{1}
- September 8: Initial D: First Stage on Hero^{2}^{8}
- September 11: Spooky Nights on Fox Filipino^{2}
- September 21: Ilustrado on GMA News TV^{2}
- September 21: Dahil May Isang Ikaw on Jeepney TV^{1}
- October 3: Junior MasterChef Pinoy Edition on Yey!^{1}
- October 4: It's Showtime: Funny One and Mga Kwento ni Marc Logan on Cine Mo!^{1}
- October 4: Precious Hearts Romances Presents: Bud Brothers on Jeepney TV^{1}
- October 5: Lovers in Paris on Jeepney TV^{1}
- October 10: Teenage Mutant Ninja Turtles season 1 on Yey!^{1}
- October 12: Hot Shot on Fox Filipino^{1}^{7}
- October 12: Ang TV (Year 3) on Jeepney TV^{1}
- October 12: Remi, Nobody's Girl and Superbook Reimagined on Yey!^{1}
- October 14: Initial D: Second Stage^{2}^{8} and Power Rangers Jungle Fury^{1} on Hero
- October 26: Princess and I on Jeepney TV^{1}
- October 26: Ilumina on Fox Filipino^{2}
- November 2: Initial D: Fourth Stage on Hero^{2}^{8}
- November 5: America's Next Top Model season 16 on Lifestyle^{6}
- November 5: Haikyu!! season 1 on Yey!^{1}
- November 7: Digimon Adventure 02 on Yey!^{1}
- November 16: Maging Sino Ka Man^{1}, Reteatro and Winter Sonata^{2} on Jeepney TV
- November 23: Bantatay on Fox Filipino^{2}
- November 28: Kung Fu Panda: Legends of Awesomeness season 2 on Yey!^{1}
- November 29: CSI: Crime Scene Investigation season 13 on Cine Mo!^{4}
- November 30: Santa's Apprentice on Yey!^{1}
- December 3: Hitman Reborn! season 3^{1} and Power Rangers RPM^{1}^{4}^{7} on Hero
- December 8: Blue Dragon on Yey!^{1}^{7}
- December 14: Ikaw ang Lahat sa Akin on Jeepney TV^{1}
- December 21: Tayong Dalawa on Jeepney TV^{1}
- December 21: Peter Pan and Wendy on Yey!^{1}^{7}
- December 28: Habang Kapiling Ka on Fox Filipino^{2}
- December 28: The Heirs on Jeepney TV^{1}
- Notes
1. ^ ^{a} Originally aired on ABS-CBN
2. ^ ^{b} Originally aired on GMA
3. ^ ^{c} Originally aired on TV5
4. ^ ^{d} Originally aired on S+A
5. ^ ^{e} Originally aired on GMA News TV
6. ^ ^{f} Originally aired on ETC
7. ^ ^{g} Originally aired on Studio 23 (now S+A)
8. ^ ^{h} Originally aired on Q (now GMA News TV)
9. ^ ^{i} Originally aired on 9TV (now CNN Philippines)
10. ^ ^{j} Originally aired on IBC

=== Video streaming services ===
The following are programs that debuted on video streaming services:

- June 25: Mr. Robot (season 1) on Iflix

== Returning or renamed programs ==
=== Major networks ===
Show	Last aired	Retitled as/Season/Notes	Channel	Return date
In Touch with Dr. Charles Stanley	2014	Same	GMA	January 4
ASAP	2014	ASAP 20	ABS-CBN	January 4
Fairy Tail	2014	Same (seasons 3 and 4)	GMA	January 5
Tropa Mo Nice Di Ba?!	2015	Tropa Mo Ko Unli Spoof	TV5	January 23
Philippine Basketball Association	2015 (season 40: "Philippine Cup")	Same (season 40: "Commissioner's Cup")	TV5 / AksyonTV	January 27
Kapamilya, Deal or No Deal	2013	Same (season 5)	ABS-CBN	February 9
The Tim Yap Show	2014	Same (season 6)	GMA	February 16
Knock Out	2010	Knock Out: Rising	GMA	March 9
Philippine Super Liga	2014 (Solar Sports; season 2: "Grand Prix Conference")	Same (season 3: "All-Filipino Conference")	TV5 / AksyonTV / Solar Sports	March 21
Teenage Mutant Ninja Turtles	2014	Same (season 2)	ABS-CBN	April 5
Naruto: Shippuden	2014	Same (season 7)	ABS-CBN	April 6
T3: Enforced	2015	T3: Alliance	TV5	April 11
WansapanaSummer	2014	Same (My App #Boyfie)	ABS-CBN	April 13
Haikyū!!	2015	Same (new day and timeslot)	ABS-CBN	April 19
Asia's Next Top Model	2014 (TV5)	Same (season 3: "Cycle 3")	GMA	April 19
Sword Art Online	2015	Same (season 2: "II")	TV5	April 25
Philippine Basketball Association	2015 (season 40: "Commissioner's Cup")	Same (season 40: "Governors' Cup")	TV5 / AksyonTV	May 5
Wowowillie	2013 (TV5)	Wowowin	GMA	May 10
Who Wants to Be a Millionaire?	2015	Same (season 14)	TV5	May 10
Teen Wolf	2015	Same (season 2)	TV5	May 11
The Baker King	2011 (GMA)	Same (Philippine adaptation)	TV5	May 18
Pangako Sa 'Yo	2002	Same (2015)	ABS-CBN	May 25
Supernatural	2015	Same (season 2)	TV5	May 27
The Voice Kids	2014	Same (season 2)	ABS-CBN	June 6
Pinoy Big Brother	2014 (season 5: "All In")	Same (season 6: "737")	ABS-CBN	June 20
Pinoy Big Brother: Über	2014 (season 5: "All In Uber")	Same (season 6: "737 GOLD")	ABS-CBN	June 22
Teen Wolf	2015	Same (season 3)	TV5	June 29
My Puhunan	2015	Same	ABS-CBN	July 7
Red Alert	2015	Same	ABS-CBN	July 8
History with Lourd	2014	Same	TV5	July 11
Philippine Super Liga	2015 (TV5 / AksyonTV / Solar Sports; season 3: "All-Filipino Conference")	Same (season 3: "Beach Volleyball Challenge Cup")	TV5	July 18
24 Oras Western Visayas	2014	Ratsada 24 Oras	GMA Iloilo	July 20
Supernatural	2015	Same (season 3)	TV5	July 31
Marimar	2008	Same (2015)	GMA	August 24
Hunter × Hunter (2011)	2014	Same (season 2)	GMA	August 24
Toriko	2014	Same (season 2)	GMA	August 24
Supernatural	2015	Same (season 4)	TV5	August 24
24 Oras North Central Luzon	2015	24 Oras Amianan	GMA Dagupan	August 31
StarStruck	2010	Same (season 6)	GMA	September 7
Your Face Sounds Familiar	2015	Same (season 2)	ABS-CBN	September 12
My Fairy Lady	2011 (ABS-CBN)	Same (Philippine adaptation)	TV5	September 14
Teenage Mutant Ninja Turtles	2014	Same (season 2) (new day and timeslot)	ABS-CBN	October 10
Philippine Super Liga	2015 (season 3: "Beach Volleyball Challenge Cup")	Same (season 3: "Grand Prix Conference")	TV5 / AksyonTV	October 10
Philippine Basketball Association	2015 (TV5 / AksyonTV; (season 40: "Governors' Cup")	Same (season 41: "Philippine Cup")	TV5	October 21
Healing Galing	2015	Same (season 2)	TV5	October 25
Mr. Bean: The Animated Series	2005	Same (season 4)	ABS-CBN	October 26
Alagang Kapatid	2012	Same	TV5	November 8
Banana Split Extra Scoop	2015	Banana Sundae	ABS-CBN	November 15

=== State-owned networks ===
Show	Last aired	Retitled as/Season/Notes	Channel	Return date
PBA D-League	2014 (season 4: "Aspirants' Cup")	Same (season 4: "Foundation Cup")	IBC	March 12
The Doctor is In	2014	Same (year 4)	PTV	April 18
Spikers' Turf	2015 (season 1: "Open Conference"	Same (season 1: "Collegiate Conference")	PTV	July 13
Kawaii International	2014	Same (season 2)	IBC	July 19
ChinoyTV	2015	Same (season 18)	PTV	July 26
Be Alive	2014	Same (season 11)	PTV	August 13
Spikers' Turf	2015 (season 1: "Collegiate Conference")	Same (season 1: "Reinforced Conference")	PTV	October 10
Here Comes Mr. Oh	2015	Same	PTV	October 19

=== Minor networks ===
Show	Last aired	Retitled as/Season/Notes	Channel	Return date
Pep News	2014	Same (now a weekly show)	Net 25	February 8
Spot Report	2009	Same	CLTV 36	June 25
UNTV Cup	2014	Same (season 4)	UNTV Life	August 30
Ignite Gospel Music Festival	2014	University Edition (season 3)	Light Network	September 5

=== Other channels ===
Show	Last aired	Retitled as/Season/Notes	Channel	Return date
Bob's Burgers	2014	Same (season 5)	Jack TV	January 5
American Dad!	2014	Same (season 11)	Jack TV	January 5
Parenthood	2014	Same (season 6)	2nd Avenue on RJTV	January 6
American Idol	2014	Same (season 14)	ETC on SBN / Star World Philippines	January 8
Winners & Losers	2014	Same (season 2)	2nd Avenue on RJTV	January 8
The League	2015	Same (season 6)	TGC (now defunct)	January 9
Glee	2014	Same (season 6)	ETC on SBN / Jack TV / Star World Philippines	January 10
Restaurant Takeover	2014	Same (season 2)	2nd Avenue on RJTV	January 13
Web Therapy	2014	Same (season 3)	2nd Avenue on RJTV	January 15
The Mindy Project	2014	Same (season 3)	2nd Avenue on RJTV	January 15
Chicago Fire	2014	Same (season 3)	Jack City (now CT)	January 16
Law & Order: Special Victims Unit	2014	Same (season 13)	Jack City (now CT)	January 16
Hart of Dixie	2014	Same (season 4)	2nd Avenue on RJTV	January 16
Sons of Anarchy	2014	Same (season 7)	Jack City (now CT)	January 17
NCIS	2014 (Jack City)	Same (season 10)	My Movie Channel	January 19
House	2014	Same (season 8)	Jack City (now CT)	January 25
The Americans	2014	Same (season 3)	Jack City (now CT)	January 29
Winners & Losers	2015	Same (season 3)	2nd Avenue on RJTV	February 9
The Walking Dead	2014	Same (season 5)	Fox Philippines	February 9
Chicago P.D.	2014	Same (season 2)	Jack City (now CT)	February 16
Warehouse 13	2013	Same (season 4)	Jack City (now CT)	February 16
The Voice	2014	Same (season 8)	AXN Asia	February 24
Hakuōki	2012	Same (season 3)	Hero	February 25
The Amazing Race	2014	Same (season 26)	AXN Asia	February 25
Survivor	2014 (season 29: "San Juan del Sur")	Same (season 30: "Worlds Adapt")	Jack TV	February 26
Covert Affairs	2014	Same (season 5)	Jack City (now CT)	February 28
Celebrity Apprentice	2014	Same (season 7)	Lifestyle	March 1
Project Runway	2014	Same (season 12)	ETC on SBN	March 2
The Following	2014	Same (season 3)	Jack City (now CT)	March 3
Toaru Kagaku no Railgun	2012	Same (season 2: "Toaru Kagaku no Railgun S")	Hero	March 5
It's Always Sunny in Philadelphia	2014	Same (season 10)	Jack TV	March 9
Top Chef	2014	Same (season 12)	2nd Avenue on RJTV	March 13
Network News	2015 (9TV)	CNN Philippines Network News	CNN Philippines	March 16
Nightly News	2015 (9TV)	CNN Philippines Nightly News	CNN Philippines	March 16
Headlines	2015 (9TV)	Updates	CNN Philippines	March 16
The Millionaire Matchmaker	2014	Same (season 6)	ETC on SBN	March 27
Gameday Weekend	2014	Same (season 3)	Balls / S+A	March 28
Brooklyn Nine-Nine	2014	Same (season 2)	Jack TV	March 31
About a Boy	2014	Same (season 2)	Jack TV	March 31
Fate/kaleid liner Prisma Illya	2014	Same (season 2: "2wei")	Hero	April 1
Shakey's V-League	2014 (season 11: "Reinforced Open Conference")	Same (season 12: "Open Conference")	GMA News TV	April 5
Royal Pains	2014 (Jack City)	Same (season 6)	CT	April 6
Log Horizon	2015	Same (season 2)	Hero	April 15
Knife Fight	2014	Same (season 2)	2nd Avenue on RJTV	April 16
Psych	2014 (Jack City)	Same (season 7)	CT	April 18
Salem	2014	Same (season 2)	Jack TV	April 19
Something to Chew On	2014 (Solar News Channel)	Same (season 3)	CNN Philippines	April 25
Drive	2014 (Solar News Channel)	Same (season 2)	CNN Philippines	April 26
The Jamie Kennedy Experiment	2013	Same (season 2)	Jack TV	May 2
Love Live! School Idol Project	2014	Same (season 2)	Hero	May 5
Louie	2014	Same (season 4)	Jack TV	May 15
Parks and Recreation	2014	Same (season 7)	Jack TV	May 15
Kool Trip	2015	Same (season 2: "The Best of the Best Edition")	S+A	May 16
Sirens	2014	Same (season 2)	Jack TV	May 22
#MichaelAngelo	2014	Same (season 2)	GMA News TV	May 30
Yu-Gi-Oh! Zexal	2013 (ABS-CBN)	Same (season 2)	Yey!	May 31
Pretty Little Liars	2015	Same (season 6)	ETC on SBN 21	June 3
Ground Floor	2014 (Jack TV)	Same (season 2)	CT	June 6
Generation RX Plus	2015	RX Plus Health, Lifestyle and Leisure	S+A	June 6
Project Runway Philippines	2012	Same (season 4)	ETC on SBN	June 14
Beauty & the Beast	2014	Same (season 3)	ETC on SBN	June 16
Tyrant	2014 (Jack City)	Same (season 2)	CT	June 17
The Fashion Fund	2014	Same (season 2)	ETC on SBN	June 19
Pinay Beauty Queen Academy	2014	Same (season 2)	GMA News TV	June 21
Suits	2015	Same (season 5)	Jack TV	June 25
Graceland	2014 (Jack City)	Same (season 3)	CT	June 26
National Collegiate Athletic Association	2015 (TV5 / AksyonTV)	Same (season 91)	S+A	June 27
Undercover Boss Canada	2014 (Solar News Channel)	Same (season 2)	CNN Philippines	June 28
The Millionaire Matchmaker	2015	Same (season 3)	ETC on SBN	July 3
MasterChef	2014	Same (season 6)	Lifestyle	July 8
Shakey's V-League	2015 (season 12: "Open Conference")	Same (season 12: "Collegiate Conference")	GMA News TV	July 11
Bates Motel	2014	Same (season 3)	Jack TV	July 12
The Strain	2014 (Jack City)	Same (season 2)	CT	July 13
The Millers	2015	Same (season 2)	2nd Avenue on RJTV	July 23
Candidly Nicole	2014	Same (season 2)	ETC on SBN	July 31
America's Next Top Model	2014	Same (season 22)	ETC on SBN	August 6
Myx Olympics	2015	Same (season 3)	Myx	August 8
Motive	2014 (Jack City)	Same (season 2)	CT	August 10
The Mentalist	2014 (Jack City)	Same (season 6)	CT	August 11
Square Off: The Firm Debates	2015	Same (season 11)	ANC	August 14
Saturday Night Live	2014	Same (season 40)	Jack TV	August 17
Bogart Case Files	2014 (9TV)	Bogart Case Files: On the Job (season 2)	CNN Philippines	August 29
Brunch @ Bobby's	2014	Same (season 5)	Lifestyle	September 1
UAAP Men's Basketball	2014	Same (season 78)	S+A	September 5
Man-Up	2015	Same (season 2)	S+A	September 6
The Ellen DeGeneres Show	2015	Same (season 13)	2nd Avenue on RJTV	September 9
The Ultimate Fighter	2014	Team Mcgregor vs. Team Faber	Balls	September 10
J.League	2014	Same (2015 season)	S+A	September 16
Etcetera	2014	Same (season 6)	ETC on SBN	September 17
What I See	2014 (Solar News Channel)	Same (season 3)	CNN Philippines	September 19
Doowee Hooper and Beatband Competition	2014	Same (season 2)	S+A	September 19
The Voice	2015	Same (season 9)	AXN Asia	September 22
The Big Bang Theory	2015	Same (season 9)	Jack TV	September 22
Empire	2015	Same (season 2)	Jack TV	September 24
The Middle	2015	Same (season 7)	2nd Avenue on RJTV	September 24
Survivor	2015 (season 30: "Worlds Adapt")	Same (season 31: "Cambodia")	Jack TV	September 24
Family Guy	2015	Same (season 15)	Jack TV	September 28
The Simpsons	2015	Same (season 27)	Jack TV	September 28
The Last Man on Earth	2015	Same (season 2)	Jack TV	September 28
Bob's Burgers	2015	Same (season 6)	Jack TV	September 28
Brickleberry	2014	Same (season 3)	Jack TV	September 28
Undateable	2015	Same (season 2)	Jack TV	September 28
Modern Family	2015	Same (season 7)	2nd Avenue on RJTV	September 30
Bones	2015	Same (season 11)	CT	October 2
Defiance	2014	Same (season 3)	Jack TV	October 3
Project Runway All Stars	2015	Same (season 3)	ETC on SBN	October 5
The Mysteries of Laura	2015	Same (season 2)	2nd Avenue on RJTV	October 6
The Flash	2015	Same (season 2)	ETC on SBN / Jack TV	October 7
Arrow	2015	Same (season 4)	Jack TV	October 8
The Vampire Diaries	2015	Same (season 7)	ETC on SBN	October 9
The Originals	2015	Same (season 3)	ETC on SBN	October 9
American Horror Story	2015	Same (season 4: "AHS: Hotel")	Jack TV	October 10
Shakey's V-League	2015 (season 12: "Collegiate Conference")	Same (season 12: "Reinforced Open Conference")	GMA News TV	October 10
Reign	2015	Same (season 3)	ETC on SBN	October 12
iZombie	2015	Same (season 2)	ETC on SBN	October 20
National Basketball Association	2015	Same (2015–16 season)	S+A / Basketball TV / NBA Premium TV	October 28
Boys Ride Out	2014 (9TV)	Boys of the Record	CNN Philippines	October 28
Grimm	2015	Same (season 5)	Jack TV	October 31
Legends	2014 (Jack City)	Same (season 2)	CT	November 3
Elementary	2015	Same (season 4)	CT	November 6
NCIS	2015 (My Movie Channel)	Same (season 11)	CT	November 9
My Hero Nation	2014	Same (season 6)	Hero	November 15
#MichaelAngelo	2015	Same (season 3)	GMA News TV	November 21
2 Broke Girls	2015	Same (season 5)	ETC on SBN	November 30
Initial D	2011	Same (season 5: "Fifth Stage")	Hero	December 4
Free!	2015	Same (season 2: "Eternal Summer")	Hero	December 4
Philippine Secondary Schools Basketball Championship	2014	Same	AksyonTV	December 13
Kuroko's Basketball	2014 (ABS-CBN)	Same (season 3)	Hero	December 15
Chaika: The Coffin Princess	2015	Same (season 2: "Avenging Battle")	Hero	December 16
Yu-Gi-Oh! 5D's	2011 (ABS-CBN)	Same (season 3)	Yey!	December 26

== Programs transferring networks ==
=== Major networks ===
Date	Show	No. of seasons	Moved from	Moved to
January 17	Kim Possible	—N/a	ABS-CBN	TV5
January 20	Hi-5	13	IBC	TV5
January 20	Rockman.EXE Axcess	—N/a	Q (now GMA News TV)	TV5
January 24	Magical DoReMi	—N/a	GMA	TV5
March 23	Transformers Animated	—N/a	GMA and Q (now GMA News TV)	TV5
March 30	Time Quest	—N/a	IBC and ABC (now TV5)	GMA
April 9	Supernatural	—N/a	Studio 23 (now S+A)	TV5
April 19	Asia's Next Top Model	3	TV5	GMA
May 10	Wowowillie	—N/a	TV5	GMA (as Wowowin)
May 11	The Medyo Late Night Show with Jojo A.	—N/a	GMA	TV5
July 4	The Flying House	—N/a	GMA	ABS-CBN
September 14	The Looney Tunes Show	—N/a	GMA	TV5
September 14	Scooby-Doo! Mystery Incorporated	—N/a	GMA	TV5
October 19	Julie's ChiefBaker – Student Edition	—N/a	CCTN 47	TV5 Cebu and TV5 Davao
November 2	Pokémon	17 (as Pokémon the Series: XY)	9TV (now CNN Philippines)	GMA
December 13	Blow by Blow	—N/a	IBC and PTV	TV5
December 14	The 700 Club Asia	—N/a	GMA News TV	GMA

=== State-owned networks ===
Date	Show	No. of seasons	Moved from	Moved to
January 4	Family TV Mass	—N/a	GMA	IBC
August 2	CESAFI	15	S+A Cebu	IBC
September 4	NAASCU	15	Net 25	IBC

=== State-owned networks ===
Date	Show	No. of seasons	Moved from	Moved to
August 16	MTRCB Uncut	2	PTV	Net 25
October 26	FilSports Basketball Association	—N/a	PTV	AksyonTV / Net 25

=== Other channels ===
Date	Show	No. of seasons	Moved from	Moved to
January 12	Superbook Classic	—N/a	GMA / ABS-CBN	Yey!
January 19	NCIS	10	Jack City (now CT)	My Movie Channel (now defunct)
January 27	Return of the Wife	—N/a	GMA	TeleAsia Filipino (now defunct)
February 11	High Kick!	—N/a	TV5	TeleAsia Filipino (now defunct)
February 19	Rockman.EXE Axess	—N/a	Q (now GMA News TV) / TV5	TeleAsia Filipino (now defunct)
February 22	Super Inggo at ang Super Tropa	—N/a	ABS-CBN	Hero
March 1	Celebrity Apprentice	7	Velvet (now defunct)	Lifestyle
March 23	Two Wives (original 2009 South Korean series)	—N/a	ABS-CBN	Jeepney TV
March 24	The Tonight Show Starring Jimmy Fallon	—N/a	My Movie Channel (now defunct)	CT
April 11	Tokyo Majin	—N/a	TV5	TeleAsia Filipino (now defunct)
April 20	The Fierce Wife	—N/a	ABS-CBN	Fox Filipino
April 20	Rubí	—N/a	ABS-CBN	Telenovela Channel
May 4	Baywatch	3	ABS-CBN / Studio 23 (now S+A)	Jeepney TV
May 7	Special A	—N/a	TV5	TeleAsia Filipino (now defunct)
May 10	Cinderella's Stepsister	—N/a	ABS-CBN	TeleAsia Filipino (now defunct)
May 11	Kuroko's Basketball	1	ABS-CBN	Yey!
May 29	The Prince of Tennis	—N/a	Q (now GMA News TV)	TeleAsia Filipino (now defunct)
May 31	Battle Spirits	—N/a	TV5	TeleAsia Filipino (now defunct)
May 31	Yu-Gi-Oh! Zexal	2	ABS-CBN	Yey!
June 3	Baywatch	4	ABS-CBN / Studio 23 (now S+A)	Jeepney TV
June 6	Ground Floor	2	Jack TV	CT
June 7	Cool Guys, Hot Ramen	—N/a	TV5	TeleAsia Filipino (now defunct)
June 9	Max Steel	1	ABS-CBN	Yey!
June 27	National Collegiate Athletic Association (Engineered for Sports Excellence in the New Decade.)	91	TV5 / AksyonTV	S+A
July 3	Baywatch	5	ABS-CBN / Studio 23 (now S+A)	Jeepney TV
July 4	Lakwatseros	—N/a	ABS-CBN News Channel	GMA News TV
July 10	Inazuma Eleven	1	ABS-CBN	Hero
July 20	Fated to Love You	—N/a	GMA	Fox Filipino
July 21	Rockman.EXE Beast	—N/a	TV5	TeleAsia Filipino (now defunct)
July 22	What's for Dinner?	—N/a	TV5	TeleAsia Filipino (now defunct)
July 31	Ryukendo	—N/a	GMA	Disney Channel
August 3	Naruto: Shippuden	7	ABS-CBN	Hero
August 15	Bundesliga	—N/a	Balls	Fox Sports
August 16	Yu-Gi-Oh! Zexal	1	ABS-CBN / S+A	Yey!
August 17	Time Between Dog and Wolf	—N/a	TV5	TeleAsia Filipino (now defunct)
August 19	Bride of the Century	—N/a	TV5	TeleAsia Filipino (now defunct)
August 25	Eyeshield 21	1	ABS-CBN / Studio 23 (now S+A) / Hero	Yey!
August 31	Ohlala Couple	—N/a	ABS-CBN	Jeepney TV
August 31	Dog of Flanders	—N/a	ABS-CBN / Q (now GMA News TV)	Yey!
September 5	Digimon Adventures	—N/a	ABS-CBN / Hero	Yey!
September 5	Defense and Security TV	—N/a	S+A	Solar Sports
October 5	Lovers in Paris (original)	—N/a	ABS-CBN	Jeepney TV
October 10	Teenage Mutant Ninja Turtles	1	ABS-CBN	Yey!
October 12	Hot Shot	—N/a	ABS-CBN / Studio 23 (now S+A)	Fox Filipino
October 12	Superbook Reimagined	—N/a	ABS-CBN	Yey!
October 12	Remi, Nobody's Girl	—N/a	ABS-CBN	Yey!
November 5	America's Next Top Model	16	ETC	Lifestyle
November 7	Digimon Adventure 02	—N/a	ABS-CBN	Yey!
November 9	NCIS	11	My Movie Channel (now defunct)	CT
November 16	Endless Love: Winter Sonata	—N/a	GMA	Jeepney TV
November 28	Kung Fu Panda: Legends of Awesomeness	2	ABS-CBN	Yey!
November 29	CSI: Crime Scene Investigation	13	S+A	Cine Mo!
November 30	Santa's Apprentice	—N/a	ABS-CBN	Yey!
November 30	Sesame Street	—N/a	9TV (now CNN Philippines)	Yey!
December 8	Blue Dragon	—N/a	ABS-CBN / Studio 23 (now S+A)	Yey!
December 15	Yakitate!! Japan	—N/a	ABS-CBN / Hero	Yey!
December 21	Peter Pan and Wendy	—N/a	ABS-CBN / Studio 23 (now S+A)	Yey!
December 26	Yu-Gi-Oh! 5D's	2	ABS-CBN	Yey!
December 28	The Heirs	—N/a	ABS-CBN	Jeepney TV

== Milestone episodes ==
The following shows made their Milestone episodes in 2015:

Show	Network	Episode #	Episode title	Episode air date
Wattpad Presents	TV5	100th	"100th Episode"	February 6
Vampire ang Daddy Ko	GMA	100th	"Bigs Big Secret"	February 15
Eat Bulaga!	GMA	10,700th	"10,700th Episode"	February 27
Yagit	GMA	100th	"Mapagkumbabang Eliza"	February 27
Two Wives (2014 Philippine series)	ABS-CBN	100th	"Attempt"	February 27
The Ryzza Mae Show	GMA	500th	"Aubrey Miles & Troy Montero's Interview"	March 3
RadyoBisyon	PTV / IBC	100th	"100th Episode"	March 5
Parenthood	2nd Avenue on RJTV	100th	"How Did We Get Here?"	March 10
Forevermore	ABS-CBN	100th	"Never Give Up"	March 13
The Half Sisters	GMA	200th	"Bulilyasong Plano"	March 13
Startalk	GMA	1,000th	"Melissa Mendez's Live Interview"	March 21
Reaksyon	TV5	600th	"600th Episode"	March 25
Gandang Gabi, Vice!	ABS-CBN	200th	"#HugotPaMore Birthday Special"	March 29
Aquino & Abunda Tonight	ABS-CBN	300th	"Isabelle Daza' Interview"	April 7
Matanglawin	ABS-CBN	400th	"400th Episode"	April 12
Dream Dad	ABS-CBN	100th	"100th Episode"	April 14
Kris TV	ABS-CBN	1,000th	"1,000th Episode"	April 22
Who Wants to Be a Millionaire?	TV5	200th	"200th Episode"	June 7
FlordeLiza	ABS-CBN	100th	"FlordeLiza Go Away"	June 9
Nasaan Ka Nang Kailangan Kita	ABS-CBN	100th	"100th Episode"	June 9
Happy Wife, Happy Life	TV5	100th	"100th Episode"	June 9
Oh My G!	ABS-CBN	100th	"100th Episode"	June 10
Sunday All Stars	GMA	100th	"100th Episode"	June 14
It's Showtime	ABS-CBN	1,800th	"1,800th Episode"	June 23
Eat Bulaga!	GMA	10,800th	"10,800th Episode"	June 27
Wattpad Presents	TV5	200th	"200th Episode"	June 30
Yagit	GMA	200th	"Guison's Resbak"	July 21
The Ryzza Mae Show	GMA	600th	"China Cojuanco's Interview"	July 23
Pari 'Koy	GMA	100th	"Bilin ni Michelle"	July 28
The Half Sisters	GMA	300th	"Twins For Auction"	August 4
Bridges of Love	ABS-CBN	100th	"100th Episode"	August 4
Aquino & Abunda Tonight	ABS-CBN	400th	"Sarah Lahbati Interview"	August 14
Reaksyon	TV5	700th	"700th Episode"	August 14
Showbiz Konek na Konek	TV5	100th	"100th' Episode"	August 21
Nathaniel	ABS-CBN	100th	"100th' Episode"	September 4
Magpakailanman	GMA	150th	"Ina Ko Bugaw Ko"	September 5
Failon Ngayon	ABS-CBN	300th	"300th Episode"	September 12
Goin' Bulilit	ABS-CBN	500th	"Highway Patrol Episode"	September 27
i-Witness	GMA	900th	"900th Episode"	October 3
The Bottomline with Boy Abunda	ABS-CBN	300th	"300th Episode"	October 3
Pangako Sa ’Yo	ABS-CBN	100th	"Scandal"	October 9
Eat Bulaga!	GMA	10,900th	"10,900th Episode"	October 15
S.O.C.O.: Scene of the Crime Operatives	ABS-CBN	500th	"Riles: The Jerome Bello Murder Case"	October 17
It's Showtime	ABS-CBN	1,900th	"1,900th Episode"	October 19
Pasión de Amor	ABS-CBN	100th	"Pananabik"	October 19
Bubble Gang	GMA	1,000th	"Happy 1000th Episode!"	November 6
Aha!	GMA	300th	"300th Episode"	November 8
StarStruck	GMA	500th	"500th Episode"	November 17
Wattpad Presents	TV5	300th	"300th Episode"	November 17
Kapamilya, Deal or No Deal	ABS-CBN	800th	"800th Episode"	November 20
Rated K	ABS-CBN	600th	"50"	November 29
Home Sweetie Home	ABS-CBN	100th	"Home Sweetie Home in Hong Kong (Part 1)"	December 5
Ningning	ABS-CBN	100th	"Maningning na Pasko"	December 11
Buena Familia	GMA	100th	"Bettina O Josephine"	December 14
The Half Sisters	GMA	400th	"Truth Is Out"	December 22
On the Wings of Love	ABS-CBN	100th	"Shocking News"	December 25
Luv U	ABS-CBN	200th	"200"	December 27

== Finales ==
=== ABS-CBN ===
The following are programs that ended on ABS-CBN:

- January 2: Santa's Apprentice (rerun)
- January 3: Superbook Reimagined (season 2)
- January 10: Honey, Watch Out!
- January 16: Give Love on Christmas
- January 23: The Adventures of Tom Sawyer (rerun)
- January 30: Faith
- February 2: Bistado
- February 3: Mutya ng Masa
- February 6: Bet on Your Baby (season 2), Komiks: Da Adventures of Pedro Penduko (rerun) and The Singing Bee
- February 13: Dog of Flanders
- March 1: The Voice of the Philippines season 2
- March 13: Bagito and Two Wives (2014)
- March 14: The Adventures of Jimmy Neutron, Boy Genius (rerun)
- March 22: My Giant Friend and Max Steel (season 1)
- April 1: Cedie, Ang Munting Prinsipe (rerun) and Remi, Nobody's Girl (rerun)
- April 5: The Buzz 15
- April 17: Dream Dad
- April 24: Unforgettable Love and WansapanaSummer: My App #Boyfie
- May 1: Fated to Love You (Korean version)
- May 22: Forevermore
- May 29: Inday Bote
- June 7: Your Face Sounds Familiar season 1
- June 19: Let's Get Married and My Lovely Girl
- June 27: Math-Tinik (rerun)
- June 28: Superbook Classic
- June 30: 3-in-1
- July 1: RealiTV
- July 24: Oh My G!
- August 7: Bridges of Love
- August 14: Naruto: Shippuden season 7
- August 21: Pinoy Big Brother: 737 GOLD
- August 28: FlordeLiza
- August 30: The Voice Kids season 2
- September 25: Aquino & Abunda Tonight and Nathaniel
- October 16: Nasaan Ka Nang Kailangan Kita
- October 23: Power Rangers Megaforce
- October 24: Why Not? (rerun)
- October 30: Banana Nite
- November 7: Banana Split Extra Scoop
- November 8: Pinoy Big Brother: 737
- November 30: Mukha
- December 4: Walang Iwanan
- December 6: Haikyu!! season 1
- December 13: Your Face Sounds Familiar season 2

==== Stopped airing ====
- February 4: My Puhunan
- February 6: Red Alert
- April 10: Haikyu!! season 1 (reason: replaced by WansapanaSummer, the program resumed on April 19)
- April 12: The Legend of Korra (rerun) and Teenage Mutant Ninja Turtles season 2 (reason: replaced by Kuroko's Basketball and Haikyū!! on April 19)
- October 24: Teenage Mutant Ninja Turtles season 2, SpongeBob SquarePants and The Flying House (reason: Due to the coverage of NBA 2015–16 season as prior to removal; however these programs continued on Yey!)

=== GMA ===
The following are programs that ended on GMA Network:

- January 2: GMA Christmas Cartoon Festival, May Queen, and Strawberry Lane
- January 5: Basta Every Day Happy
- January 9: Hiram na Alaala
- January 23: Hunter × Hunter (2011; season 1)
- January 30: Bleach season 5
- February 6: Ang Lihim ni Annasandra
- February 13: Prime Minister and I and The Tim Yap Show (season 6)
- February 14: Tropang Potchi
- February 20: My Name is Kim Sam Soon (rerun)
- February 28: Puppy in My Pocket: Adventures in Pocketville
- March 1: Monsuno
- March 6: More Than Words
- March 13: Future's Choice
- March 28: Magic Kaito
- March 29: Superhero Sunday
- April 1: Women in the Sun
- April 10: Knock Out: Rising
- April 14: Empress Ki
- April 20: Fairy Tail (seasons 3 and 4)
- May 1: Fall in Love with Me and Once Upon a Kiss
- May 3: GMA Tales of Horror
- May 8: Kailan Ba Tama ang Mali? and Second Chances
- May 22: My Love from the Star (rerun)
- May 24: Top 20 Funniest
- June 12: The Mermaid
- June 26: Corazon Indomable
- June 27: Angry Birds Toons (season 1)
- June 30: King of Ambition
- July 5: InstaDad
- July 12: Asia's Next Top Model (cycle 3)
- July 17: Martin Mystery (rerun) and Time Quest
- July 24: Yagit
- July 25: Sabado Badoo
- July 31: Secret Garden (rerun)
- August 2: Sunday All Stars
- August 7: Let the Love Begin, My Mother's Secret and The Rich Man's Daughter
- August 16: Alamat (season 1)
- August 21: Magi: The Labyrinth of Magic and Pari 'Koy
- August 27: Pinocchio
- August 30: Dragon Ball Fight! Presents
- September 4: Reply 1997
- September 11: Healing Hearts and Birth of a Beauty
- September 12: Startalk
- September 18: The Ryzza Mae Show
- September 25: The Master's Sun (rerun)
- September 27: Kamen Rider OOO and To the Top
- October 16: How the Earth Was Made
- October 30: Home Foodie (season 1), Hunter × Hunter (2011; season 2), and Two Mothers
- November 5: Legendary Women
- November 13: My Faithful Husband
- November 20: The King's Doctor
- November 27: Beautiful Strangers and Stairway to Heaven (2003; rerun)
- December 11: The Tim Yap Show
- December 19: StarStruck season 6

==== Stopped airing ====
- March 29: GMA Blockbusters
- April 24 (reason: cost-cutting measures)
  - 24 Oras Ilokano (GMA Ilocos)
  - 24 Oras Bikol (GMA Bicol)
  - 24 Oras Northern Mindanao (GMA Cagayan de Oro)
  - Isyu Subong Negrense (GMA Bacolod)
  - Buena Mano Balita (GMA Cebu)
  - Arangkada (GMA Iloilo/GMA Bacolod)
  - Primera Balita (GMA Dagupan)
  - Una Ka BAI (GMA Davao)
- April 26: People, Events and Places
- August 28: 24 Oras North Central Luzon (GMA Dagupan)
- November 13: Ratsada 24 Oras (GMA Iloilo) (reason: retrenchment)

=== TV5 ===
The following are programs that ended on TV5:

- January 9: Ben 10: Ultimate Alien, Hulk and the Agents of S.M.A.S.H., Lloyd in Space, X-Men, and Hi-5 (series 13)
- January 11: Emperor's New School, Gravity Falls, Quiet Please!: Bawal ang Maingay and Who Wants to Be a Millionaire? (season 13)
- January 16: Confessions of a Torpe (rerun), Johnny Bravo (rerun) Tropa Mo Nice Di Ba?! and The Replacements
- January 17: Iskul Bukol (rerun)
- January 18: Ben 10 (2005; rerun)
- February 1: Stitch!
- February 3: Teen Wolf season 1
- February 13: Infinity Nado
- March 5: Agents of S.H.I.E.L.D. season 1
- March 20: Henry Hugglemonster, Rockman.EXE Axess, Phineas and Ferb (rerun) and Sofia the First
- April 1: T3: Enforced
- April 8: The Vampire Diaries season 1
- April 16: Solved na Solved
- April 17: Healing Galing
- April 19: Call Me Papa Jack and Sword Art Online
- April 25: Everybody Hapi (rerun)
- May 1: Rockman.EXE Beast, Street Fighter II V and Teacher's Pet
- May 2: Ben 10: Omniverse, Little Einsteins, Kim Possible and The Powerpuff Girls
- May 3: Move It: Clash of the Streetdancers
- May 4: Demolition Job
- May 5: Numero
- May 7: Unang Tikim
- May 8: Astig (rerun) and Supernatural season 1
- May 14: 2015 PSL All-Filipino Conference
- May 23: Rising Stars Philippines
- May 26: Teen Wolf season 2
- June 5: Hi-5 series 9
- June 20: Extreme Series: Kaya Mo Ba 'To?
- June 26: Supernatural season 2
- June 28: Mac and Chiz and Wow Mali Lakas ng Tama
- July 1: Kenichi: The Mightiest Disciple
- July 4: 2½ Daddies and Tropa Mo Ko Unli Spoof
- July 10: Doc McStuffins (season 1) and Higglytown Heroes
- July 19: Sword Art Online II
- July 25: KISPinoy: The K-Pop Philippination
- July 26: Fushigi Yuugi OVA
- July 30: Teen Wolf season 3
- August 7: Kim Possible (rerun)
- August 14: Avengers Assemble (rerun)
- August 16: Misterless Misis
- August 21: Supernatural season 3
- August 28: Phineas and Ferb (rerun)
- August 30: Fushigi Yuugi (rerun) and Nike Rise
- September 2: Transformers Animated
- September 3: Kenichi: The Mightiest Disciple (rerun)
- September 11: Baker King
- September 18: Teacher's Pet (rerun)
- September 22: Supernatural season 4
- September 27: Jinrilationships
- October 2: Happy Wife, Happy Life and Showbiz Konek na Konek (season 2)
- October 4: Tanods
- October 7: Agents of S.H.I.E.L.D. season 1 (rerun) and The Vampire Diaries season 1 (rerun)
- October 18: Sword Art Online (rerun)
- November 1: No Harm, No Foul
- November 6: The Medyo Late Night Show with Jojo A.
- November 13: Hulk and the Agents of S.M.A.S.H. (rerun)
- November 14: Magical DoReMi
- November 22: Who Wants to Be a Millionaire? (season 14)
- December 5: 2015 PSL Grand Prix Conference
- December 11: My Fair Lady
- December 19: Kano Luvs Pinay
- December 20: Julie's ChiefBaker – Student Edition (season 2) (TV5 Cebu and TV5 Davao)

=== PTV ===
- January 4: In This Corner
- June 2: Spikers' Turf 1st Season Open Conference
- September 27: Spikers' Turf 1st Season Collegiate Conference
- December 6: Spikers' Turf 1st Season Reinforced Open Conference

==== Stopped airing ====
- March: Asenso Pinoy

=== IBC ===
The following are programs that ended on IBC:

- July 10: The Gospel of the Kingdom
- September 26: Showbiz Unlimited
- November 4: News Team 13 @ 10pm

=== Minor networks ===
The following are programs that ended on minor networks:

- March 9: Hamon: Central Luzon on CLTV 36
- April 28: UNTV Cup (season 3) on UNTV
- July 31: Rise N Shine on UNTV
- August 9: I Love Pinas on Light Network
- September 25: Pasikatan Extra on CLTV 36
- September 26: Pasikatan: CLTV 36 Talent Search on CLTV 36
- December 8: QUAT: Quick Action Team on UNTV Life

==== Stopped airing ====
- August 9: Spoon on Net 25

==== Unknown dates ====
- DW News, DW-TV Journal, In Good Shape, Math Magaling and The Janice Hung Show on Net 25

=== Other channels ===
- January 1: Yu-Gi-Oh! Zexal season 1 (rerun) on Hero
- January 1: The Biggest Loser US season 11: Couples 4 on TGC (now defunct)
- January 2: Ikaw ay Pag-Ibig on Jeepney TV
- January 2: The Chair NZ and The League (season 5) on TGC (now defunct)
- January 3: Baki the Grappler on TeleAsia Filipino (now defunct)
- January 4: Initial D: Second Stage (rerun) on Hero
- January 5: Mobile Suit Gundam AGE (rerun) on Hero
- January 6: Marco's Kitchen Burnout on 2nd Avenue
- January 7: Hotel Babylon on 2nd Avenue
- January 8: Deception on 2nd Avenue
- January 8: Formal Wars on ETC
- January 9: Primetime on ANC on ANC
- January 9: The One Who Couldn't Love on Telenovela Channel
- January 10: Married (season 1) and Suburgatory (season 3) on 2nd Avenue
- January 10: Top Chef Masters season 5 on TGC (now defunct)
- January 12: Captain Earth on Hero
- January 13: Naruto: Shippuden season 5 (rerun) on Hero
- January 14: Interior Therapy with Jeff Lewis (season 2) on 2nd Avenue
- January 14: 40 Day-Daily Prayer of Pilgrimage to Pope Francis on 9TV (now CNN Philippines)
- January 14: 100 Days to Heaven on Jeepney TV
- January 16: My Beloved on Fox Filipino
- January 16: Basketball Tribe on TeleAsia Filipino (now defunct)
- January 18: Bakugan: Gundalian Invaders on TeleAsia Filipino
- January 19: Kuroko's Basketball season 1 (rerun) on Hero
- January 24: Magic Palayok on GMA News TV
- January 24: I Am Meg (season 3) on ETC
- January 26: A to Z on ETC
- January 26: Queen Seon Deok on TeleAsia Filipino (now defunct)
- January 29: Tenjho Tenge on TeleAsia Filipino (now defunct)
- January 30: Protect the Boss on Jeepney TV
- January 31: White Collar (season 4) on Fox TV Philippines
- February 1: Takeshi's Medical Check-up on Jeepney TV
- February 6: Leviathan: The Last Defense on Hero
- February 7: Becoming A Billionaire on TeleAsia Filipino (now defunct)
- February 13: Law & Order: Special Victims Unit season 13 on Jack City (now CT)
- February 13: Kōtetsu Sangokushi on TeleAsia Filipino (now defunct)
- February 14: Sons of Anarchy season 7 on Jack City (now CT)
- February 14: Constantine on Jack TV
- February 15: NBC Nightly News on 9TV (now CNN Philippines)
- February 16: American Horror Story: Freak Show on Jack TV
- February 18: Shaman King on TeleAsia Filipino
- February 20: Atlantika on Fox Filipino
- February 20: Two and a Half Men season 12 on Jack TV
- February 20: He's Beautiful (Japanese version) on Jeepney TV
- February 23: Barasu on Jeepney TV
- February 23: The Bachelor season 10 on TGC (now defunct)
- February 24: Kuroko's Basketball season 2 (rerun) on Hero
- February 27: The League (season 6) on TGC (now defunct)
- February 28: Fukuoka Love Stories on Jeepney TV
- February 28: Jeopardy! and Wheel of Fortune on TGC (now defunct)
- March: The Tonight Show Starring Jimmy Fallon on My Movie Channel
- March 5: Asuko March on Jeepney TV
- March 6: Suits season 4 on Jack TV
- March 7: UAAP Season 77 Men's Volleyball tournaments on Balls and S+A
- March 8: The Before and After on Jeepney TV
- March 10: One Week Friends on Hero
- March 12: News Café on 9TV (now CNN Philippines)
- March 13: Hakuoki (season 3) on Hero
- March 13: Daybreak, Network News, Newsday, Nightly News and Opposing Views on 9TV (now CNN Philippines)
- March 13: Iisa Pa Lamang (rerun) on Jeepney TV
- March 14: Beware the Batman and Care Bears: Welcome to Care-a-Lot on 9TV (now CNN Philippines)
- March 14: UAAP Season 77 Women's volleyball tournaments on Balls and S+A
- March 15: Good Company, Headlines, Pokémon: XY, Sesame Street, Strawberry Shortcake's Berry Bitty Adventures and Young Justice on 9TV (now CNN Philippines)
- March 16: Ginebra San Miguel's Ganadong Pinoy on CNN Philippines
- March 18: Ultraman Mebius (rerun) on Hero
- March 18: I Dare You (season 1) on Jeepney TV
- March 19: Empire season 1 on Jack TV
- March 20: Luna Mystika on Fox Filipino
- March 20: Partners By Blood on Jeepney TV
- March 21: Glee season 6 on ETC and Jack TV
- March 21: JackCITY Central and JackCITY Exclusives on Jack City (now CT)
- March 23: NCIS season 10 on My Movie Channel (now defunct)
- March 24: The 100 (season 2) on Jack TV
- March 25: Pretty Little Liars season 5 on ETC
- March 25: Maria Flordeluna (rerun) on Jeepney TV
- March 26: Naruto: Shippuden season 6 (rerun) on Hero
- March 27: A Woman's Word (rerun) on Telenovela Channel
- March 28: Eyeshield 21 (season 2; rerun) and Yumeiro Patissiere on Hero
- March 30: The Walking Dead season 5 on Fox Philippines
- March 31: Parenthood season 6 on 2nd Avenue
- April 3: Hart of Dixie season 4 on 2nd Avenue
- April 8: Big Spring Clean (season 1) on 2nd Avenue
- April 9: Toaru Kagaku no Railgun S on Hero
- April 9: Kristie's Fill Your House for Free on 2nd Avenue
- April 10: Pilipinas, Game Ka Na Ba? on Jeepney TV
- April 11: Super Inggo at ang Super Tropa on Hero
- April 11: Helena's Promise on Jeepney TV
- April 11: Return of the Wife on TeleAsia Filipino
- April 12: Please Eat This on Jeepney TV
- April 14: Log Horizon season 1 on Hero
- April 17: Adik Sa'Yo and It Started with a Kiss (season 2) on Fox Filipino
- April 17: Don't Mess with an Angel on Telenovela Channel
- April 19: Your Song Presents: Boystown on Jeepney TV
- April 21: Hakuoki (seasons 1 and 2; rerun) on Hero
- April 23: The Americans season 3 on CT
- April 24: Power Rangers RPM (rerun) and Tai Chi Chasers on Hero
- April 24: Agua Bendita on Jeepney TV
- May 1: Krystala on Jeepney TV
- May 4: The Last Man on Earth (season 1) on Jack TV
- May 6: Forever and Person of Interest season 4 on CT
- May 6: Tokyo Majin on TeleAsia Filipino (now defunct)
- May 8: The Big Bang Theory season 8 on Jack TV
- May 9: House season 4 and Lie to Me season 3 on Fox TV Philippines
- May 11: New Girl season 4 on ETC
- May 11: It's Always Sunny in Philadelphia season 10 on Jack TV
- May 12: The Originals season 2 on ETC
- May 14: 2015 PSL All-Filipino Conference on AksyonTV and Solar Sports
- May 14: Asia's Got Talent season 1 on AXN Asia
- May 14: Arrow season 3 on CT and Jack TV
- May 14: American Idol season 14 on ETC
- May 15: The Vampire Diaries season 6 on ETC
- May 15: Magdusa Ka on Fox Filipino
- May 15: La Madrasta (rerun) on Telenovela Channel
- May 16: The Amazing Race 26 on AXN Asia
- May 16: Angel season 3, Cold Case season 3, Gossip Girl season 1, Smallville season 6, The Mentalist season 1, Veronica Mars season 2 and Without a Trace season 4 on Fox TV Philippines
- May 17: Grimm season 4 on CT and Jack TV
- May 17: 90210 season 1, Bones season 8, Buffy the Vampire Slayer season 6, Ghost Whisperer season 4, Made in Jersey, Numbers season 5, and One Tree Hill season 4 on Fox TV Philippines
- May 18: Elementary (season 3) on CT
- May 18: Family Guy season 13 and The Simpsons season 26 on Jack TV
- May 19: The Following season 3 on CT
- May 19: Reign season 2 and Stalker on ETC
- May 19: Log Horizon season 2 on Hero
- May 20: The Voice season 8 on AXN Asia
- May 20: The Flash season 1 on ETC and Jack TV
- May 20: Power Rangers Operation Overdrive (rerun) on Hero
- May 21: The Fierce Wife on Fox Filipino
- May 21: Love Live! School Idol Project (season 2) on Hero
- May 21: Magkaribal (rerun) on Jeepney TV
- May 21: Survivor: Worlds Apart on Jack TV
- May 21: Late Show with David Letterman on RTL CBS Entertainment
- May 23: Modern Family season 6 on 2nd Avenue
- May 23: Luv U Pet (season 1) on GMA News TV
- May 24: Ground Floor (season 1) on CT
- May 25: Don't Cry, My Love on TeleAsia Filipino
- May 27: The Mysteries of Laura (season 1) on 2nd Avenue
- May 29: Chicago Fire season 3 on CT
- May 30: Special A on TeleAsia Filipino (now defunct)
- May 31: 2014 Shakey's V-League 12th Season Open Conference on GMA News TV
- May 31: Celebrity Apprentice season 7 on Lifestyle
- June: My Crazy Love on ETC
- June 1: Chicago P.D. season 2 on CT
- June 1: Project Runway season 12 on ETC
- June 2: Baywatch (season 3) on Jeepney TV
- June 2: About a Boy (season 2) on Jack TV
- June 3: Growing Up on Jeepney TV
- June 4: The Mindy Project (season 3) and Winners & Losers season 2 on 2nd Avenue
- June 6: Eyeshield 21 (season 3; rerun) on Hero
- June 6: Cinderella's Stepsister on TeleAsia Filipino (now defunct)
- June 7: Best Bars in America (season 1) and Car Matchmaker (season 1) on CT
- June 8: American Dad! season 10 and Bob's Burgers season 5 on Jack TV
- June 8: 2 Broke Girls season 4 on ETC
- June 12: Bones season 10 on CT
- June 12: Grazilda on Fox Filipino
- June 13: Covert Affairs (season 5) on CT
- June 14: Gotham season 1 on CT
- June 15: Game of Thrones season 5 on HBO Asia
- June 15: Kuroko's Basketball (season 1) on Yey!
- June 16: Brooklyn Nine-Nine season 2 on Jack TV
- June 19: The Millionaire Matchmaker (season 6) on 2nd Avenue
- June 19: Law & Order: Special Victims Unit season 13 on CT
- June 19: Top Chef season 12 on ETC
- June 21: House season 8 on CT
- June 22: Cool Guys, Hot Ramen on TeleAsia Filipino (now defunct)
- June 24: iZombie (season 1) on ETC
- June 26: The Last Prince on Fox Filipino
- June 27: Rooftop Prince on Jeepney TV
- June 29: Warehouse 13 season 4 on CT
- June 30: Inside the Actors Studio, Entertainment Tonight and The Insider on My Movie Channel (now defunct)
- June 30: Legend of the Seeker (season 2) on S+A
- July 1: Momay on Jeepney TV
- July 2: Baywatch (season 4) on Jeepney TV
- July 4: Ground Floor (season 2) on CT
- July 7: Digimon Adventure (rerun) on Hero
- July 8: Digimon Tamers (rerun) on Hero
- July 10: Haikyu!! season 1 on Hero
- July 10: Goin' Bulilit Classics (Year 2), Hiram and Two Wives (2009; rerun) on Jeepney TV
- July 12: Salem season 2 on Jack TV
- July 12: !Oka Tokat on Jeepney TV
- July 18: Asia's Next Top Model (cycle 3) on GMA News TV
- July 18: Psych season 7 on CT
- July 19: How I Rock It (season 1) on CT
- July 20: Trigun (rerun) on Hero
- July 20: Battle Spirits on TeleAsia Filipino (now defunct)
- July 21: Walang Hanggan on Jeepney TV
- July 23: Rectify (season 1) on CT
- July 24: The Fashion Fund (season 2) on ETC
- July 25: Maligno and Mutya (rerun) on Jeepney TV
- July 28: Sicily Unpacked on 2nd Avenue
- July 30: Eye Candy on ETC
- August 3: Winners & Losers season 3 on 2nd Avenue
- August 3: American Odyssey on CT
- August 4: Royal Pains (season 6) on CT
- August 7: Parks and Recreation season 7 and The Comedians on Jack TV
- August 12: Great Continental Railway Journeys (season 2) on 2nd Avenue
- August 13: I Love Pinas on GMA News TV
- August 14: Panahon Ko 'to!: Ang Game Show ng Buhay Ko on Jeepney TV
- August 14: Rockman.EXE Beast on TeleAsia Filipino (now defunct)
- August 14: Complications on CT
- August 14: Louie season 4, Mulaney and Sirens (season 2) on Jack TV
- August 16: Yu-Gi-Oh! Zexal season 2 on Yey!
- August 17: Kuroko's Basketball (season 1; rerun) on Hero
- August 20: Fated to Love You (Taiwanese version) on Fox Filipino
- August 23: Pinoy Big Brother Revisited: Teen Edition (season 1) on Jeepney TV
- August 27: Rockman.EXE Beast Plus on TeleAsia Filipino (now defunct)
- August 28: Munting Heredera on Fox Filipino
- August 28: Princess Hours on Jeepney TV
- August 29: Brew Dogs (season 1) on Jack TV
- August 30: Undercover Boss Canada (season 2) on CNN Philippines
- August 30: Lucky Bastards (season 1) on CT
- September 2: Say I Love You on Hero
- September 2: Saturday Night Live season 40 on Jack TV
- September 2: Tyrant (season 2) on CT
- September 3: Animazing Tales (rerun) on Hero
- September 4: Pepito Manaloto on Fox Filipino
- September 5: Street Art Throwdown (season 1) on Jack TV
- September 7: Aquarium Evolution on Hero
- September 11: Beauty & the Beast season 3 on ETC
- September 11: The One Who Couldn't Love (rerun) on Telenovela Channel
- September 13: Weekend Fix on CT
- September 13: Bates Motel season 3 on Jack TV
- September 15: Sa Piling Mo on Jeepney TV
- September 17: Prime Suspect USA on CT
- September 17: Bakuman, Black and White (rerun), Bride of the Century, EZ Shop, Good Wife, Bad Wife (rerun), Love You a Thousand Times (rerun), Shaider (rerun), The Prince of Tennis (rerun), Time Between Dog and Wolf (rerun), What's for Dinner? (rerun) on TeleAsia Filipino (now defunct)
- September 18: Graceland (season 3) on CT
- September 18: Candidly Nicole (season 2) on ETC
- September 20: Project Runway Philippines season 4 on ETC
- September 20: Pinay Beauty Queen Academy (season 2) on GMA News TV
- September 22: Madam Secretary season 1 on 2nd Avenue
- September 22: Akame ga Kill! and Kuroko's Basketball (season 2; rerun) on Hero
- September 24: Knife Fight (season 2) and The Millers (season 2) on 2nd Avenue
- September 25: Satisfaction (season 1) on 2nd Avenue
- September 27: The Voice Kids season 2 on Yey!
- October 2: Ohlala Couple on Jeepney TV
- October 4: 2015 Shakey's V-League 12th Season Collegiate Conference on GMA News TV
- October 5: The Strain (season 2) on CT
- October 5: Selfie on ETC
- October 5: F Word Out Loud on Lifetime Asia
- October 6: Allegiance on CT
- October 6: A Gentleman's Dignity (rerun) on Jeepney TV
- October 8: Power Rangers Samurai (rerun) on Hero
- October 9: Inazuma Eleven season 1 on Hero
- October 9: Kung Tayo'y Magkakalayo (rerun) on Jeepney TV
- October 10: The Jamie Kennedy Experiment (season 2) on Jack TV
- October 11: The Messengers on Jack TV
- October 13: Initial D: First Stage (rerun) on Hero
- October 14: Pretty Little Liars season 6 on ETC
- October 16: Ilustrado on GMA News TV
- October 20: Mara Clara (2010) on Jeepney TV
- October 22: Storyline on ANC
- October 22: Hot Shot on Fox Filipino
- October 23: First Look and Umagang Kay Ganda on ANC
- October 23: Sugo on Fox Filipino
- October 29: NCAA Season 91 Men's Basketball tournaments on Balls and S+A
- October 30: The Millionaire Matchmaker (season 7) on 2nd Avenue
- October 30: Spooky Nights on Fox Filipino
- October 30: Amaya on GMA News TV
- October 30: Initial D: Second Stage (rerun) on Hero
- October 30: Lovers in Paris on Jeepney TV
- October 31: The Odd Couple (season 1) on CT
- November 1: Digimon Adventure on Yey!
- November 1: Home Foodie (season 1) on GMA News TV
- November 2: Motive (season 2) on CT
- November 4: Eyeshield 21 (season 1) on Yey!
- November 5: Ellen's Design Challenge on 2nd Avenue
- November 7: Pinoy Big Brother: 737 Online on Jeepney TV
- November 12: Free! (season 1) on Hero
- November 13: The Thorn Birds on Jeepney TV
- November 14: Doowee Hooper and Beatband Competition (season 2) on S+A
- November 20: Ilumina on Fox Filipino
- November 21: Gameday Weekend on S+A/Balls
- November 21: Teenage Mutant Ninja Turtles season 1 on Yey!
- November 22: It's Showtime: Funny One on Cine Mo!
- November 25: MasterChef U.S. season 8 on Lifestyle
- November 26: Tai Chi Chasers on Yey!
- December 1: Hitman Reborn! (seasons 1 and 2; rerun) on Hero
- December 2: UAAP Season 78 Men's Basketball tournaments on Balls and S+A
- December 3: Etcetera (season 6) on ETC
- December 3: Initial D: Fourth Stage (rerun) on Hero
- December 3: Max Steel (season 1) on Yey!
- December 5: 2015 PSL Grand Prix Conference on AksyonTV and Solar Sports
- December 5: America's Next Top Model (cycle 22) on ETC
- December 6: 2015 Shakey's V-League 12th Season Reinforced Open Conference on GMA News TV
- December 8: Dahil May Isang Ikaw on Jeepney TV
- December 9: Scream Queens season 1 on ETC
- December 9: Haikyu!! (season 1) on Yey!
- December 11: Dracula on ETC
- December 11: The 700 Club Asia on GMA News TV
- December 14: Project Runway All Stars season 3 on ETC
- December 15: Drowning City on Fox Filipino
- December 15: Chaika: The Coffin Princess on Hero
- December 16: The Voice season 9 on AXN Asia
- December 17: Survivor: Cambodia on Jack TV
- December 18: Ina, Kapatid, Anak on Jeepney TV
- December 18: Remi, Nobody's Girl on Yey!
- December 20: Yu-Gi-Oh! Zexal (season 1) on Yey!
- December 22: Free! (season 2) on Hero
- December 24: Initial D: Fifth Stage and Naruto: Shippuden season 7 on Hero
- December 25: Bantatay on Fox Filipino
- December 25: Winter Sonata on Jeepney TV
- December 26: Defiance (season 3) on Jack TV
- December 26: Junior MasterChef Pinoy Edition on Yey!
- December 27: In Touch with Dr. Charles Stanley on Fox TV Philippines
- December 28: Dog of Flanders on Yey!
- December 31: Ultimate Fighting Championship on S+A/Balls
- December 31: Christmas from the Heart 2015 on SMNI

==== Stopped airing ====
- February 5: Tai Chi Chasers, Voltron Force and Yu-Gi-Oh! Zexal season 1 on S+A (reason: Action Kids block prior to removal and transferred to Yey!)
- August 28: Eyeshield 21 (season 1; rerun) on Hero (reason: to be replaced with Log Horizon (rerun) from August 31)

=== Video streaming services ===
- September 3: Mr. Robot (season 1) on Iflix

== Networks ==
The following is a list of Free-to-Air and Local Cable Networks making noteworthy launches and closures during 2015.

=== Launches ===
Date	Station	Channel	Source
January 1	Boomerang Philippines	SkyCable Channel 118 (SD); Cablelink Channel 213 (SD)	
March 1	HGTV	SkyCable Channel 88 (SD) and Channel 246 (HD); Destiny Cable Channel 88 (SD Digital) and Channel 246 (HD Digital)	
March 31	The Aquarium Channel HD	SkyCable and Destiny Cable Channel 244 (Metro Manila) and Channel 752 (Provincial)	
June 1	Catsup	Channel 51 (DTT)	
August 15	Juan Sports Channel	Cignal Channel 56	
October 3	ABS-CBN HD	SkyCable and Destiny Cable Channel 167 (Metro Manila) and Channel 700 (Provincial)	
October 5	Bloomberg TV Philippines	Cignal Channel 8 (SD) and Channel 127 (HD)	

=== Rebranded ===
The following is a list of television stations or cable channels that have made or will make noteworthy network rebrands in 2015.

Date	Rebranded from	Rebranded to	Channel	Source
February 1	RTL CBS Entertainment (as a main Asian feed)	RTL CBS Entertainment (as a separate Philippine feed)	Dream Satellite TV Channel 17 (Nationwide); Sky Cable Channel 53 (SD) / Channel 196 (HD) (Metro Manila); Destiny Cable Channel 53 (Metro Manila); Cablelink Channel 37 (SD) / Channel 313 (HD) (Metro Manila)	
March 16	9TV	CNN Philippines	Channel 9 (analog feed) / Channel 19 (digital feed); Cignal Channel 10 (Nationwide); G Sat Channel 3 (Nationwide); Sky Cable / Destiny Cable Channel 14 (Metro Manila); Cablelink Channel 14 (Metro Manila)	
March 22	Jack City	CT	Destiny Cable Channel 138 (Digital); SkyCable Channel 138; Cablelink Channel 40; Cignal Channel 22	
October 1	Screen Red	Red by HBO	Cignal Channel 68 (Nationwide); Dream Satellite TV Channel 32 (Nationwide); Sky Cable Channel 74 (Metro Manila); Destiny Cable Channel 45 Analog / Channel 74 Digital (Metro Manila); Cablelink Channel 203 (Metro Manila)	

=== Closures ===
Date	Station	Channel	Sign-on debut	Source
February 28	TGC	Destiny Cable Channel 89; SkyCable Channel 219; Cablelink Channel 225	April 8, 2011	
March 15	9TV	Channel 9 (analog feed) / Channel 19 (digital feed); Cignal Channel 10 (Nationwide); G Sat Channel 3 (Nationwide); SkyCable / Destiny Cable Channel 14 (Metro Manila); Cablelink Channel 14 (Metro Manila)	August 23, 2014	
March 21	Jack City	Destiny Cable Channel 138 (Digital); SkyCable Channel 138; Cablelink Channel 40; Cignal Channel 22	October 20, 2012	
June 30	My Movie Channel	SkyCable Channel 25; Destiny Cable Channel 89 (analog) / Channel 25 (digital); Cablelink Channel 45	January 3, 2013	
September 17	TeleAsia	Cignal Channel 12 (TeleAsia Filipino) / Channel 84 (TeleAsia Chinese)	December 18, 2012	
December 31	Balls	SkyCable Channel 34/195 (HD); Destiny Cable Channel 36	January 1, 2008	

=== Stopped broadcasting ===
The following is a list of stations and channels or networks that have stopped broadcasting or (temporarily) off the air in 2015.

Station	Channel	Stopped broadcasting	Resumed broadcasting	Reason	Source
Yey!	ABS-CBN TV Plus Channel 4 Sky Cable Channel 1 (Metro Manila) / Channel 109 (Provincial)	May 3	May 4	Signed off for one day in support of Pacquiao-Mayweather fight. Resumed its regular operations on May 4.	
Pinoy Big Brother: 737 24/7 Livestream	Sky Cable Channel 85	July 3	August 17	Temporary suspension of its 24/7 livestreaming on cable and online, due to malicious posts spreading through social media about the relationship of young housemates Kenzo Gutierrez (aged 18) and Bailey May (aged 12). Program changed into SPG rating by the Movie and Television Review and Classification Board on ABS-CBN after the incident, then reverted to the standard PG rating after Ryan Bacalla was evicted from the house. With the entrance of the regular housemates on Day 50, viewers were given limited streaming for two hours on weekdays, during Pinoy Big Brother: 737 Online. Resumed its 24-hour live streaming on cable and online on August 17 (which is Day 59 of the said show), after the addition of a "Parental Guidance" on-screen text (later an MTRCB adopted blue "PG" system) for the safety of its viewers.	

== Awards ==
- January 28: MITV Gawad Kamalayan, organized by the Mapua Institute of Technology.
- February 8: 2015 Paragala Central Luzon Media Awards, organized by the Holy Angel University.
- February 18: 2015 Adamson University Media Awards, organized by the Adamson University. (awarded to GMA News anchor Vicky Morales)
- February 19: 2015 Gawad Tanglaw Awards, organized by the UPHSD-Delta Las Pinas
- April 11: The Platinum Stallion Media Awards 2015, organized by the Trinity University of Asia
- April 16: 11th USTV Awards, organized by the Pontifical and Royal University of Santo Tomas
- April 26: Golden Screen TV Awards, organized by the Entertainment Press Society, held at the Carlos Romulo Theater, Makati
- April 28: 23rd KBP Golden Dove Awards, organized by the Kapisanan ng mga Brodkaster ng Pilipinas (KBP)
- June 11: 35th Rotary Club of Manila Journalism Awards, organized by the Rotary Club of Manila
- June 14: 46th Box Office Entertainment Awards, organized by the Guillermo Mendoza Memorial Scholarship Foundation
- July 3: 17th VACC Awards, organized by the Volunteers Against Crime and Corruption
- August 15: 5th EdukCircle TV Awards, organized by the International Center for Communication Studies, held at the UP Theater
- August 16: 10th COMGUILD Media Awards, organized by the COMGUILD Center for Journalism
- November 4: 37th Catholic Mass Media Awards, organized by the CMMA Foundation
- November 7: Illumine: 1st GCIC Innovation Awards for Television, organized by Global City Innovative College
- December 3: 29th PMPC Star Awards for Television, organized by the Philippine Movie Press Club
- December: 1st ALTA Media Icon Awards, organized by the University of Perpetual Help System DALTA

== Winners ==
These are awards held in 2015.

=== Local ===
This list only includes the Golden Screen TV Awards and PMPC Star Awards for Television.

Award ceremony	Best TV Station	Best Drama Series	Best Drama Actor	Best Drama Actress	Best Drama Supporting Actor	Best Drama Supporting Actress	Best Comedy/Gag Show	Best Comedy/Gag Actor	Best Comedy/Gag Actress	Best Comedy/Gag Supporting Actor	Best Comedy/Gag Supporting Actress	Ref.
6th Golden Screen TV Awards	GMA	Ang Dalawang Mrs. Real (Original); Villa Quintana (Adapted)	Dingdong Dantes; Ang Dalawang Mrs. Real	Maricel Soriano; Ang Dalawang Mrs. Real	Tirso Cruz III; Ikaw Lamang	Alessandra de Rossi; Ang Dalawang Mrs. Real	Pepito Manaloto (Comedy); Bubble Gang (Gag)	Michael V. Pepito Manaloto	Angelica Panganiban; Banana Nite	Sef Cadayona; Vampire Ang Daddy Ko	Carmi Martin; Ismol Family	
29th PMPC Star Awards for Television	ABS-CBN	Bridges of Love (Primetime); The Half Sisters (Daytime); Ilustrado (Mini-Series); Magpakailanman (Anthology)	Alden Richards; Ilustrado	Maja Salvador; Bridges of Love	Baron Geisler; Nathaniel	Sheryl Cruz; Strawberry Lane	Pepito Manaloto (Comedy); Banana Split Extra Scoop (Gag)	Jayson Gainza; Banana Split Extra Scoop	Rufa Mae Quinto; Bubble Gang			

=== International ===
This list only includes the International Emmys and the Asian Television Awards.

Award	Category	Nominee	Result	Source
20th Asian Television Awards	Best Game or Quiz Programme	Celebrity Bluff	Nominated	
20th Asian Television Awards	Best Comedy Performance by an Actor/Actress	Michael V. Pepito Manaloto	Nominated	

== Births ==
- October 2: Princess Kathrine "Kulot" Caponpon, singer

== Deaths ==
January

- January 9 – Susan Calo Medina, host of Travel Time and Tipong Pinoy (b. 1941)

March

- March 4 – Jam Sebastian, part of Jamich, a real-life couple who gained popularity in YouTube (b. 1986)
- March 14 – Liezl Martinez, actress and MTRCB board member (b.1967)

April

- April 17 – Ricardo Reyes a.k.a. Richie D'Horsie, comedian (b. 1957)

June

- June 13 – Junix Inocian, actor (b. 1951)
- June 25 – Jonathan Oldan, assistant cameraman, CNN Philippines (b. 1986)

July

- July 7 – Julia Buencamino, teen actress (b. 1999)
- July 8 – Lucita Soriano, veteran actress (b. 1941)
- July 15 – Pocholo Montes, veteran actor (b. 1946)
- July 24 – Jimboy Salazar, actor and singer (b. 1973)

August

- August 2 – Marcelo "Ozu" Ong, actor, dancer and singer, member of Masculados Dos (b. 1985)
- August 6 – Amado Pineda, weatherman, GMA Network (b. 1938)

October

- October 8 – Elizabeth Ramsey, comedian, singer and actress (b. 1931)

November

- November 8 – Rey Mercaral, Net 25/Eagle News Service anchor

== See also ==
- 2015 in television
