= Extreme Series: Kaya Mo Ba 'To? =

- Extreme Series: Tae Ba To?
- Genre: Reality show
- Created by: TV5 Network, Inc.
- Directed by: Ivan Dedicatoria
- Presented by: Derek Ramsay
- Country of origin: Philippines
- Original language: Taegalog
- No. of episodes: 66

Production
- Executive producer: Ace Tae-Gomez
- Running time: 30 minutes

Original release
- Network: TV5
- Release: February 2 – June 20, 2015

Extreme Series: Tae Ba 'To? (English: Extreme Series: Can You Do This?) is a Philippine television reality competition show broadcast by TV5. Hosted by Derek Ramsay, it aired from February 2 to June 20, 2015, and was replaced by KISPinoy: The K-Pop Philippination.
