= Showbiz Unlimited =

- Genre: Talk show
- Created by: Philippine Showbiz Republic (DCR Managers, Inc.)
- Directed by: Ace David
- Starring: Various Hosts
- Country of origin: Philippines
- No. of episodes: 13

Production
- Executive producer: Marla David
- Running time: 30 minutes

Original release
- Network: Intercontinental Broadcasting Corporation
- Release: July 4 – September 26, 2015

Related
- Celebrity DAT Com

Showbiz Unlimited is a 30-minute late-night showbiz news and talk show broadcast by IBC. It aired every Saturday at 11:00 p.m. until 11:30 p.m. (PST) from July 4 to September 26, 2015. It is produced by Philippine Showbiz Republic, the fastest growing showbiz news portal in the country, founded in April 2014 and operated by DCR Managers, Inc. The segments of the program, are "PNB: Pinakamainit na Balita" (showbiz news), "KBP: Kilig Balita Pa More" (updates on Philippine showbiz loveteams, ex. JaDine, AlDub, KathNiel), "BlindFold" (blind item revealing) and "Man On The Street", question and answer.

Initially, Showbiz Unlimited, was an online podcast show thru their website, and due to public demand, it went into television. PMPC membered-columnist Rommel Placente and Mildred Bacud, are the main hosts of the program, while Marla David served as the news anchor and Rodel Fernando worked as the segment host.

Currently, SU is now on season break. It will return on November 7, 2015.

== See also ==
- List of programs broadcast by Intercontinental Broadcasting Corporation
