= Pasikatan: CLTV 36 Talent Search =

- Created by: Central Luzon Television
- Directed by: Ian Celis
- Presented by: Andy Pangan; Awit Garcia
- Country of origin: Philippines

Production
- Executive producer: Jay-Ar Hipolito
- Running time: 2-3 hours

Original release
- Network: CLTV 36
- Release: April 13, 2013 – September 26, 2015

Pasikatan: CLTV 36 Talent Search (Dahil Dito KaRehiyon, Ikaw ang Sikat!) is the biggest region-wide reality talent competition aired over CLTV 36, focused and emphasized to discover the people of Central Luzon (Region III) that have unique talents to show and shine for, Pasikatan was formerly known as StarMill in the first two seasons of the program.

It was aired on this channel every Saturday afternoons (live elimination shows at Robinson's Star Mills and Angeles) and it also have a 30-minute program called "Pasikatan Extra" which featured the behind the scenes of the program itself.

== Present Hosts ==
- Andy Pangan
- Awit Garcia
- Hans Lee (Pasikatan Extra)

== Present Judges ==
- Joebee Henson - Fashion Expert and Dance Instructor
- Cesar Pambid - Tabloid columnist and Radio broadcaster
- Harvey Quiwa - Singer and Councilor of City of San Fernando, Pampanga
- Randy del Rosario - Artistic Director of Arti Sta. Maria
- Lisset Laus-Velasco - Music & Arts Enthusiast and Laus Group of Companies Deputy COO

== History ==
StarMill (now known as Pasikatan) was launched in March 2013 during the anniversary rites of CLTV 36 held in Robinson's Starmills, as part of LGC's commitment to discover bright stars from the region and give them broader recognition thru the wide reach of the network's signal, reaching the 5 provinces in the region.

In the first season of StarMill, Dance group SnapBoyz ruled the first season with their impressive dance number during the finale as they take home the grand winner title of StarMill. They won P3.5 million pesos worth of grand prizes, including House and Lot, TV contract, brand new Haima Car, P100,000 cash from Robinson's Malls, home theater system, two round trip tickets to Macau, skin care services and college scholarships, Andy Pangan, Daniel Ombao and Eliza Arnaiz, also won their 1st, 2nd and 3rd runner-up finishes in the season.

One year after, during the Season 2 of the competition, which is the "Star Search", heartthrob JD Simon, hailed from Pampanga, won the finals tilt. Simon claimed over P1.7 million worth of cash prizes and different prizes, in the grand finals last September 2014. Barbie Manalo---the Star Diva of Pampanga; Louie Anne Culala---the Stunning Diva of Bulacan; and Lemuel Lansangan---the Hotshot of Bataan, finished as 1st, 2nd and 3rd runners-up.

CLTV 36, organized the successful concert (in two parts) featuring the alumni of Season 1 and Season 2 of StarMill held at the Bren Z. Guiao Convention Center, in February 2015.

=== Pasikatan (Season 1) ===
Renz Ruther Robosa, "The Passionate Ballader of Tarlac" was the grand winner of Pasikatan (season 1), garnering 83.52% total number of votes. Robosa, performed a duet with Joanna Roman and sang "Ikaw Lamang" as his winning piece during the Grand Finals. He took home P1 million pesos worth of grand prizes, consisting of Pangkabuhayan Showcase from WileePao Delights, scholarship from Jocson College, P500, 000 cash prize, among others. Present in the finals were, LGC and CLTV Chairman Levy P. Laus, LGC Director Tess Laus, CLTV President Sonia Soto, and CLTV Deputy General Manager Billy San Juan.

Name	Rank
Renz Ruther Robosa	Champion
Vergel de Guzman	1st Place
Christian Gonzales	2nd Place / Popularity Award
Aljon Gutierrez	3rd Place
Joanna Roman	4th Place
Armie David	5th Place

== See also ==
- Central Luzon Television
