= Move It: Clash of the Streetdancers =

- Genre: Dance competition
- Created by: TV5 Network, Inc.
- Presented by: Jasmine Curtis-Smith; Tom Taus
- Country of origin: Philippines
- Original language: Filipino

Production
- Running time: 60 minutes

Original release
- Network: TV5
- Release: January 25 – May 3, 2015

Move It: Clash of the Streetdancers is a Philippine television reality competition show broadcast by TV5. Hosted by Jasmine Curtis-Smith and Tom Taus, it aired from January 25 to May 3, 2015, replacing Who Wants to Be a Millionaire? and was replaced by Who Wants to Be a Millionaire?. It airs every Sunday at 7:00pm, later moved to 8:00pm (PST).

== Hosts ==
- Jasmine Curtis-Smith
- Tom Taus

== See also ==
- List of TV5 (Philippine TV network) original programming
