= Rising Stars Philippines =

Philippine reality television program

- Genre: Reality
- Presented by: Ogie Alcasid; Venus Raj; Mico Aytona
- Judges: Jaya; Papa Jack; Nina; Jimmy Bondoc
- Country of origin: Philippines
- Original language: Filipino
- No. of episodes: 10

Production
- Production company: Rising Stars Asia

Original release
- Network: TV5
- Release: March 14 – May 23, 2015

Rising Stars Philippines is a Philippine television reality competition show broadcast by TV5. Hosted by Venus Raj, Ogie Alcasid and Mico Aytona, it aired from March 14 to May 23, 2015.

The 16-year-old Rocelle Solquillo eventually won the first season for winning 3 straight weeks and closely defeating Krezia Mae Tonacao, Lee'Anna Layumas who came 3rd and Remy Luntayao who came 4th respectively.

== Format ==
The Auditions were held around the Philippines, from Metro Manila to Mindanao. No age limit were required to join, as long as contestants can sing and have a 'rising star' quality. A recording booth like studio were scattered around the country known as the Audition caravan is the venue of the auditions. Auditions were also available through a website and a mobile application. In mobile application auditions, an auditioner must download the risingstars mobile karaoke and use it while singing and recording themselves from it. The Auditioner's song piece performance on the booth are posted on an online website, where public can vote, and choose the top performers. The ones who get Judge's stars and the ones with the most votes go into the mall shows where in they will fight for the top 3 spots. If they won the top 3 spots from the (10 mall shows overall, and 5 contestants were picked from online/mobile app) mall shows, they will advance on the live semifinals on television. Among all the contestants, 35 lucky singing aspirants were selected to be on the show through online auditions and auditions around the country. Every week contestants will face different challenges. Contestants will sing on the live stage with the judges and audience in front of them. after they sing, they will be called one by one and they will be informed if they had made it to the top 16. On the top 8 of the show, they had launched a new twist, where in a contender will challenge a Finalist to take a spot on his/her slot.

== Prizes ==
The winner will receive 500,000 pesos worth of gift certificates, Smart talk & text freebies, 100,000 worth of beauty products and services from Jancen Clinic and the Vine aesthetics, a free tuition at center for pop school and a trip to Hong Kong and a recording contract. the runner-up also receive same prizes, 250,000 pesos and 50,000 worth of beauty products and services, as well as the 3rd placer got 100,000 pesos and 25,000 worth of beauty products and services.

== Top 35 ==
- Avel Grace Molles
- Chiastina Perez - (Online winner)
- Christian Amata
- Lucas Garcia - (Online Winner)
- Joselito Gustilo
- Nikki Love Dumalagan
- Ronnie Sarucam
- Jestonie Divino
- Rochelle Newbold
- Ruby Cabudoy
- Rochelle Solquillo
- Kurt Espiritu
- Lee'Anna Layumas
- Rochelle Marie Ubay-Ubay
- Mark Guile Las Pinas
- Ryan Royce Faigao
- Nesteer Ernz Macan
- Tricia Louise Sianson
- Samantha Hoberg
- Mia Barbra Derilo
- Marichar Labado - (Online Winner)
- Dave Alcano
- Kristian Luke Vargas
- Karl Zarate
- Remy Luntayao
- Fatima Valenzona
- PFC Donna Macopia
- PFC Aiza Moreno
- Robert Cozma
- Jake Diaz - (Online Winner)
- Danielle Najarro
- Victoria Ingram - (Online Winner)
- Julienne Mae Mora
- Duane David
- Krezia Mae Tonacao
- Wilbert Hermosada

== Top 16 ==
- Chiastine Faye 'Cha' Perez - 25, Laguna
- Mia Barbra 'Barbie' Derilo - 27, Iloilo
- Dave Alcano - 21, Cebu
- Duane David - 19, Batangas
- Joselito 'Bon' Gustillo Jr - 28, Manila
- Karl Zarate - 21, Manila
- Krezia Mae Tonacao - 13, Metro Manila
- Lee'Anna Justine Weber Layumas - 22, Bacolod
- Lucas Nicco Garcia - 16, Batangas
- Remy Luntayao - 15, Laguna
- Robert D. 'Rob' Cozma - 48, Dagupan
- Rocelle Jeanne R. Solquillo - 16, Bacolod
- Ronnie 'Roni' Sarucam - 13, Davao
- Samantha 'Sam' Hoberg - 16, Iloilo
- Victoria Ingram - 18, Cebu
- PFC Virna Liza 'Aiza' Moreno - 28, Nueva Ecija

== Challengers ==
- Alliyah Cadeliña - 15, Manila

She was chosen to battle one of the finalists. Hoping to get into the top 8 and in the competition, she challenged Le'Anna Layumas with the song Girl on Fire but she did not won the battle, with Lee'Anna still secured on her spot in the top 8.

- Victoria Ingram - 18, Cebu

She among with two other eliminated contestants Jestonie and Kurt were brought back, after getting the highest votes in challenge-a-star online. but only Victoria was chosen. She challenged Barbie Derilo, with the song Iris. In the end, Victoria beat Barbie in a close fight, securing herself in the top 6.

== Elimination chart ==
Winner	Runner-up	3rd Place	4th Place	Safe	Bottom group	Eliminated	Wildcard
Did not perform	Advanced to top 16	Won challenge	Eliminated at challenge	Won challenge and Returned	Shining Star of the night	Voter's choice of the week	Shining Star of the night & Voter's choice

Stage:		Finals											
Week:		3/14	3/21	3/28	4/11	4/19	4/25	5/2		5/9		5/16	5/23
Place	Contestant	Result											
1	Rocelle Solquillo	DNP	DNP	Advanced	DNP	DNP	Safe	Safe	Win	Safe	Win	Win	Winner
2	Krezia Mae	DNP	DNP	DNP	DNP	Advanced	Safe	Safe	safe	Safe	Bottom 2	Safe	Runner-up
3	Lee'Anna Layumas	DNP	DNP	Advanced	DNP	DNP	Safe	Won	Safe	Safe	Safe	Safe	3rd Place
4	Remy Luntayao	Advanced	DNP	DNP	DNP	DNP	Bottom 9	Safe	Safe	Safe	Safe	Bottom 2	4th Place
5	Victoria Ingram	DNP	DNP	DNP	DNP	Advanced	Eliminated			Returned	Safe	Eliminated	
6	Bon Gustillo	DNP	DNP	DNP	Advanced	DNP	Safe	Safe	Bottom 3	Safe	Eliminated		
7	Barbie Derilo	DNP	Advanced	DNP	DNP	DNP	Safe	Safe	Safe	Eliminated			
8-9	Aiza Moreno	Advanced	DNP	DNP	DNP	DNP	Safe	Safe	Eliminated				
8-9	Samantha Hoberg	DNP	Advanced	DNP	DNP	DNP	WIN	Safe	Eliminated				
10	Alliyah Cadelina	DNP	DNP	DNP	DNP	DNP	Wildcard	Eliminated					
11-17	Cha Perez	DNP	DNP	DNP	DNP	Advanced	Eliminated						
11-17	Dave Alcano	DNP	Advanced	DNP	DNP	DNP	Eliminated						
11-17	Duane David	DNP	DNP	DNP	DNP	Advanced	Eliminated						
11-17	Karl Zarate	Advanced	DNP	DNP	DNP	DNP	Eliminated						
11-17	Lucas Garcia	DNP	DNP	DNP	Advanced	DNP	Eliminated						
11-17	Rob Cozma	DNP	DNP	Advanced	DNP	DNP	Eliminated						
11-17	Roni Sarucam	DNP	DNP	DNP	Advanced	DNP	Eliminated						

== Contestants who appeared on other talent shows ==
- Remy Luntayao was a part of the group Luntayao Family who was a finalist on Pilipinas Got Talent
- Karl Zarate was a finalist on Pop Star Kids
- Lee’Anna Layumas was a semifinalist on Tawag ng Tanghalan Year 6 on It’s Showtime (2022-2023) ABS-CBN
