= Home Foodie =

Philippine television cooking show

- Title card
- Genre: Cooking show
- Presented by: Iya Villania; Drew Arellano
- Country of origin: Philippines
- Original language: Tagalog
- No. of seasons: 5

Production
- Camera setup: Multiple-camera setup
- Running time: 30 minutes
- Production company: San Miguel Food and Beverage, Inc.

Original release
- Network: GMA Network
- Release: August 10, 2015 – September 6, 2019

Home Foodie is a Philippine television cooking show broadcast by GMA Network. Hosted by Iya Villania and Drew Arellano, it premiered on August 10, 2015 on the network's morning line up. The show concluded on September 6, 2019.

== Hosts ==
- Drew Arellano (2015–19)
- Iya Villania (2016–19)

== Accolades ==
Accolades received by Home Foodie
Year	Award	Category	Recipient	Result	Ref.
2018	Native Advertising Awards	Best Use of Advertiser-Funded Programming Broadcast	Home Foodie	Won	
