= Naruto: Shippuden season 7 =

Naruto: Shippuden
- Season 7
- Season 7 Cover
- No. of episodes: 8

Release
- Original network: TV Tokyo
- Original release: January 21 – March 11, 2010

Season chronology
- ← Previous; Season 6 Next → Season 8

The seventh season of the Naruto: Shippuden anime series is directed by Hayato Date, and produced by Studio Pierrot and TV Tokyo. The seventh season aired from January 21 to March 11, 2010, on TV Tokyo in Japan. The anime only season follows Naruto Uzumaki and Utakata attempting to destroy the Forbidden Jutsu and save Hotaru. It is referred to by its DVDs as the chapter of The Six-Tailed Demon Slug (六尾発動, Rokubi Hatsudō).

The two DVD volumes were released by Aniplex on August 4 and September 1, 2010.

The English dubbed version of the season aired on Neon Alley from February 4 to 16, 2013. The season would make its English television debut on Adult Swim's Toonami programming block and premiere from February 5 to March 26, 2017.

This season contains two musical themes: "Sign" by Flow is used as the opening theme and "For You" by Azu is used as the ending theme.

== Episodes ==
No. overall	No. in season	Title	Directed by	Written by	Original release date	English air date
The Six-Tailed Demon Slug
144	1	"Wanderer"; Transliteration: "Fūraibō" (Japanese: 風来坊)	Masaaki Kumagai	Junki Takegami	January 21, 2010	February 4, 2013
On a cliff a young man, a girl, and her servant are attacked by a group of ninja. The servant sends word to the Hidden Leaf Village for aid and the young man, Utakata, leaves with the girl, Hotaru. Back in the Leaf, Tsunade tells Shizune of a clan named the Tsuchigumo and an elder named En no Gyoja who developed a forbidden jutsu, which the Leaf are to prevent the theft of. Team 7 and Yamato arrive to assist Utakata and Hotaru, but Utakata leaves immediately with faith that they will assist her.
145	2	"Successor of the Forbidden Jutsu"; Transliteration: "Kinjutsu no keishōsha" (Japanese: 禁術の継承者)	Shigeharu Takahashi	Shin Yoshida	January 28, 2010	February 9, 2013
The ninja bandits have a meeting with their leader about the Forbidden Jutsu. Elsewhere Team 7 tricks Hotaru into staying as her bodyguards until they reach her village. After reminiscing about the past, Utakata wakes up to come across the ninja bandits and fights them until he is cornered by their barrier jutsu which soon explodes. Team 7 finally reach Hotaru's village and they leave her in their care, but Naruto Uzumaki senses something troubling and heads back to the village, suspicious of the villagers' attitude toward Hotaru.
146	3	"The Successor's Wish"; Transliteration: "Keishōsha no omoi" (Japanese: 継承者の想い)	Hiroshi Kimura	Yuka Miyata	February 4, 2010	February 9, 2013
Hotaru's uncle shows her to her room, where she is ambushed by the bandits. They are trapped and Hotaru escapes into the forest, but the bandits catch up to her. Utakata saves her, and the bandit's leader shows that Utakata is being hunted for 50 million ryo. Utakata and Hotaru land in a secluded place where Hotaru shows him something on her body. Suddenly Mist Tracker Ninja attack Utakata and take Hotaru hostage. They tell Hotaru that Utakata killed his former master. Naruto soon arrives with Yamato and Sai.
147	4	"Rogue Ninja's Past"; Transliteration: "Nukenin no kako" (Japanese: 抜け忍の過去)	Yuki Kinoshita	Yasuyuki Suzuki	February 11, 2010	February 9, 2013
The Hidden Mist ANBU and Yamato negotiate and it is hinted that Utakata is a Jinchuriki. It is then decided that Utakata will travel with the Hidden Leaf until their mission is complete before the Mist ANBU take him back to their village. Utakata didn't mean to kill his master; it is realized that while trying to separate the tailed beast from him, it came out and killed Utakata's master. Later Hotaru is hurt leading Naruto to find out that the Forbidden Jutsu is engraved into her back.
148	5	"Heir to Darkness"; Transliteration: "Yami no kōkeisha" (Japanese: 闇の後継者)	Eiko Nishi	Shin Yoshida	February 18, 2010	February 9, 2013
The bandits' leader appears on Mt. Katsurugi and listens in on a conversation between Tonbei, Hotaru, Utakata, and Team 7. Tonbei suggests that they should remove the Forbidden Jutsu from Hotaru for her safety, but Hotaru suggests searching for Shiranami, another person who could use the jutsu. Naruto leaves to go search for him and it is revealed that the bandit leader is Shiranami. Utakata leaves to speak with Tsurugi, but Tsurugi and the rest of the Anbu encounter a dog with Rinnegan eyes.
149	6	"Separation"; Transliteration: "Betsuri" (Japanese: 別離)	Shuu Watanabe	Masahiro Hikokubo	February 25, 2010	February 16, 2013
Naruto arrives at Shiranami's cabin and is captured by the bandits. Utakata, who had found a note left by Hotaru and was looking for her, arrives and drives the bandits away with his Six-Tails's chakra. Hotaru encounters Shiranami, who captures her and takes her to the Tsuchigumo village. He takes control of her and the villagers and takes her with him to unseal the Forbidden Jutsu. Naruto and Utakata track Shiranami and Hotaru to the village, but are attacked by the villagers and the bandits, who stall them until Team 7 arrives.
150	7	"The Forbidden Jutsu Released"; Transliteration: "Kinjutsu hatsudō" (Japanese: 禁術発動)	Kiyomu Fukuda	Yasuyuki Suzuki	March 4, 2010	February 16, 2013
Shiranami has Hotaru in a binding jutsu that keeps her restrained in one place. Shiranami asserts that Hotaru is nothing but a vessel to collect the natural chakra energy that will release the jutsu. Utakata and Naruto arrive but are held back by Shiranami's binding jutsu. However, they manage to free themselves. Meanwhile, Team 7 struggles with the bandits and villagers and is unable to advance. Finally, Shiranami gathers all the energy he requires and releases the Fury Jutsu.
151	8	"Master and Student"; Transliteration: "Shitei" (Japanese: 師弟)	Yuusuke Onoda	Yasuyuki Suzuki	March 11, 2010	February 16, 2013
Hotaru cries, believing that she killed Naruto and Utakata, however they still manage to move. Meanwhile, Team 7 fights the bandits and defeat them. Hotaru's body starts to overflow with natural chakra and Shiranami tries to escape but is defeated by Naruto. Utakata then uses his Six-Tails's chakra to consume and stops the flow of chakra. In the end, Team 7 leaves and Hotaru and Utakata start their travels, but Utakata is ambushed by Pain and defeated, using his last strength to blow bubbles to tell Hotaru to live on.

== Home media release ==
=== Japanese ===
Volume	Date	Discs	Episodes	Reference
1	August 4, 2010	1	144–147	
2	September 1, 2010	1	148–151	

=== English ===
Viz Media (North America, Region 1)
Box set	Date	Discs	Episodes	Reference
12	October 9, 2012	3	141–153	

Viz Media (North America, Region 1 Blu-ray sets)
Volume	Date	Discs	Episodes	Ref.
6	April 29, 2025	4	138–165	

Manga Entertainment (United Kingdom, Region 2)
Volume	Date	Discs	Episodes	Reference
12	March 18, 2013	2	141–153	

Madman Entertainment (Australia/New Zealand, Region 4)
Collection	Date	Discs	Episodes	Reference
12	January 9, 2013	2	141–153	
