= List of Fairy Tail episodes =

Wordmark of the series

Fairy Tail is an anime television series based on the manga series Fairy Tail by Hiro Mashima. Produced by A-1 Pictures and Satelight, and directed by Shinji Ishihira, the first season was broadcast on TV Tokyo from October 12, 2009, to March 30, 2013. It continued a year later for a second season run from April 5, 2014, to March 26, 2016. A third and final season aired from October 7, 2018, to September 29, 2019. The series follows the adventures of Natsu Dragneel, a member of the Fairy Tail wizards' guild who is searching for the dragon Igneel, and partners with Lucy Heartfilia, a celestial wizard.

The series uses 52 different pieces of theme music: 26 opening themes and 26 ending themes. Several CDs containing the theme music and other tracks have been released by Pony Canyon and Avex Group. The first DVD compilation was released on 29 January 2010, with individual volumes being released monthly. The Southeast Asian network Animax Asia aired part of the series locally in English.

In 2011, Funimation licensed the first season for an English-language release in North America. The Funimation-dubbed episodes aired on the Funimation Channel. The first DVD set, containing 12 episodes, was released on 22 November 2011. Similarly sized sets followed, with 14 sets released as of 2 December 2014. Funimation also acquired the rights to simulcast the relaunched anime episodes.

== Series overview ==
Season	Episodes	Originally released	
Season	Episodes	First released	Last released
1	175	October 12, 2009	March 30, 2013
2	102	April 5, 2014	March 26, 2016
3	51	October 7, 2018	September 29, 2019

== Episodes ==
=== Season 1 (2009–13) ===
No. overall	No. in season	Title	Directed by	Written by	Animation directed by	Original release date	English air date
Prologue
1	1	"The Fairy Tail"; Transliteration: "Yōsei no Shippo" (Japanese: 妖精の尻尾)	Directed by : Hiroyuki Fukushima; Storyboarded by : Shinji Ishihira	Masashi Sogo	Tomoaki Chishima & Kenji Hattori	October 12, 2009	November 22, 2011
2	2	"Fire Dragon, Monkey, and Bull"; Transliteration: "Karyū to Saru to Ushi" (Japanese: 火竜と猿と牛)	Directed by : Kiichi Suzuno; Storyboarded by : Shinji Ishihira	Atsuhiro Tomioka	Kazuyuki Ikai	October 19, 2009	November 29, 2011
3	3	"Infiltrate the Everlue Mansion"; Transliteration: "Sennyū Seyo!! Ebarū Yashiki" (Japanese: 潛入せよ!! エバルー屋敷)	Directed by : Yusaku Saotome; Storyboarded by : Shinji Ishihira	Shōji Yonemura	Teruhiko Yamazaki & Akiko Matsuo	October 26, 2009	December 6, 2011
4	4	"Dear Kaby" (Note: Stylized in all caps in the original Latin script); Transliteration: "Shin'ai Naru Kābii e" (Japanese: 親愛なるカービィへ)	Directed by : Naomichi Yamato; Storyboarded by : Shinji Ishihira	Masashi Sogo	Tomoki Mizuno	November 2, 2009	December 13, 2011
Eisenwald Arc
5	5	"The Wizard in Armor"; Transliteration: "Yoroi no Madōshi" (Japanese: 鎧の魔導士)	Directed by : Shigeru Yamazaki; Storyboarded by : Shinji Ishihira	Fumihiko Shimo	Jōji Yanase	November 9, 2009	December 20, 2011
6	6	"Fairies in the Wind"; Transliteration: "Yōsei-tachi wa Kaze no Naka" (Japanese: 妖精たちは風の中)	Directed by : Kiichi Suzuno; Storyboarded by : Shinji Ishihira	Fumihiko Shimo	Kazuyuki Ikai	November 16, 2009	January 10, 2012
7	7	"Flame and Wind"; Transliteration: "Honō to Kaze" (Japanese: 炎と風)	Directed by : Yoshiyuki Asai; Storyboarded by : Shinji Ishihira	Atsuhiro Tomioka	Tomohiro Koyama	November 23, 2009	January 17, 2012
8	8	"The Strongest Team"; Transliteration: "Saikyō Chīmu!!!" (Japanese: 最強チーム!!!)	Directed by : Kyōhei Ishiguro; Storyboarded by : Shinji Ishihira	Shōji Yonemura	Asako Inayoshi	November 30, 2009	January 24, 2012
9	9	"Natsu Devours a Village"; Transliteration: "Natsu, Mura o Kū" (Japanese: ナツ、村を食う)	Directed by : Mitsuhiro Yoneda; Storyboarded by : Shinji Ishihira	Masashi Sogo	Masaki Inada	December 7, 2009	January 31, 2012
10	10	"Natsu vs. Erza"; Transliteration: "Natsu bāsasu Eruza" (Japanese: ナツ vs. エルザ)	Hiroyuki Fukushima	Masashi Sogo	Kenji Hattori	December 14, 2009	February 7, 2012
Galuna Island Arc
11	11	"The Cursed Island"; Transliteration: "Norowa-reta Shima" (Japanese: 呪われた島)	Directed by : Satoshi Shimizu; Storyboarded by : Mashu Itō	Fumihiko Shimo	Satoru Minowa	December 21, 2009	February 14, 2012
12	12	"Moon Drip"; Transliteration: "Mūn Dorippu" (Japanese: 月の雫(ムーンドリップ))	Directed by : Yusaku Saotome; Storyboarded by : Hiroyuki Fukushima	Atsuhiro Tomioka	Akiko Matsuo & Yuji Ushijima	January 4, 2010	February 21, 2012
13	13	"Natsu vs. Yuka the Wave User"; Transliteration: "Natsu bāsasu Hadō no Yūka" (Japanese: ナツ vs. 波動のユウカ)	Naomichi Yamato	Shōji Yonemura	Tomoki Mizuno	January 11, 2010	February 28, 2012
14	14	"Just Do Whatever!!"; Transliteration: "Katte ni Shiyagare!!" (Japanese: 勝手にしやがれ!!)	Directed by : Shigeru Yamazaki; Storyboarded by : Hiroyuki Fukushima	Fumihiko Shimo	Jōji Yanase	January 18, 2010	March 6, 2012
15	15	"Eternal Magic"; Transliteration: "Eien no Mahō" (Japanese: 永遠の魔法)	Directed by : Masaomi Andō; Storyboarded by : Shinji Ishihira	Atsuhiro Tomioka	Asako Inayoshi	January 25, 2010	April 3, 2012
16	16	"The Final Showdown on Galuna Island"; Transliteration: "Garuna-tō - Saishū Kessen" (Japanese: ガルナ島 最終決戦)	Yoshiyuki Asai	Shōji Yonemura	Tomohiro Koyama	February 1, 2010	April 10, 2012
17	17	"Burst"	Directed by : Mitsuhiro Yoneda; Storyboarded by : Touma Shirakawa	Masashi Sogo	Masaki Inada	February 8, 2010	April 17, 2012
18	18	"Reach the Sky Above"; Transliteration: "Todoke - Ano Sora ni" (Japanese: 届け あの空に)	Directed by : Satoshi Shimizu; Storyboarded by : Mashu Itō	Fumihiko Shimo	Toshiko Sasaki & Satoru Minowa	February 15, 2010	April 24, 2012
Standalone side stories
19	19	"Changeling"; Transliteration: "Chenjiringu" (Japanese: チェンジリング)	Hiroyuki Fukushima	Masashi Sogo	Takashi Uchida	February 22, 2010	May 1, 2012
20	20	"Natsu and the Dragon Egg"; Transliteration: "Natsu to Doragon no Tamago" (Japanese: ナツとドラゴンの卵)	Directed by : Yusaku Saotome; Storyboarded by : Shinji Ishihira	Shōji Yonemura	Akiko Matsuo & Yuji Ushijima	March 1, 2010	May 8, 2012
Phantom Lord Arc
21	21	"The Phantom Lord"; Transliteration: "Yūki no Shihaisha" (Japanese: 幽鬼の支配者)	Directed by : Shunichi Yoshizawa; Storyboarded by : Shinji Ishihira	Atsuhiro Tomioka	Atsushi Aono	March 8, 2010	May 15, 2012
22	22	"Lucy Heartfilia"; Transliteration: "Rūshii Hātofiria" (Japanese: ルーシィ・ハートフィリア)	Directed by : Eisuke Hayashi; Storyboarded by : Shinji Ishihira & Touma Shirakawa	Atsuhiro Tomioka	Toshiharu Murata	March 15, 2010	May 22, 2012
23	23	"15 Minutes"; Transliteration: "Jūgo-fun" (Japanese: 15分)	Directed by : Kyōhei Ishiguro; Storyboarded by : Shinji Ishihira	Masashi Sogo	Yousuke Kabashima	March 22, 2010	May 29, 2012
24	24	"To Keep From Seeing Those Tears"; Transliteration: "Sono Namida o Minai Tame ni" (Japanese: その涙を見ない為に)	Directed by : Mitsuhiro Yoneda; Storyboarded by : Shinji Ishihira	Shōji Yonemura	Masaki Inada	March 29, 2010	June 5, 2012
25	25	"A Flower Blooms in the Rain"; Transliteration: "Ame no Naka ni Saku Hana" (Japanese: 雨の中に咲く花)	Yoshiyuki Asai	Fumihiko Shimo	Toshiharu Murata	April 12, 2010	June 12, 2012
26	26	"Wings of Flame"; Transliteration: "Honō no Tsubasa" (Japanese: 炎の翼)	Directed by : Noriaki Saito; Storyboarded by : Shinji Ishihira & Touma Shirakawa	Atsuhiro Tomioka	Sunghoo Park & Young-Beom Kim	April 19, 2010	June 19, 2012
27	27	"The Two Dragon Slayers"; Transliteration: "Futari no Doragon Sureiyā" (Japanese: 二人の滅竜魔導士(ドラゴンスレイヤー))	Directed by : Tetsuya Watanabe; Storyboarded by : Shinji Ishihira	Masashi Sogo	Tomoshige Inayoshi	April 26, 2010	June 26, 2012
28	28	"Fairy Law"; Transliteration: "Fearī Rō" (Japanese: フェアリーロウ)	Hiroyuki Fukushima	Shōji Yonemura	Tomohiro Koyama	May 3, 2010	July 3, 2012
29	29	"My Resolve"; Transliteration: "Atashi no Ketsui" (Japanese: あたしの決意)	Directed by : Yusaku Saotome; Storyboarded by : Shinji Ishihira	Fumihiko Shimo	Yuji Ushijima & Akiko Matsuo	May 10, 2010	July 10, 2012
Loke Arc
30	30	"Next Generation"	Directed by : Takahiro Majima; Storyboarded by : Mashu Itō	Masashi Sogo	Miyuki Koga	May 17, 2010	July 17, 2012
31	31	"A Star Removed from the Sky"; Transliteration: "Sora ni Modorenai Hoshi" (Japanese: 空に戻れない星)	Directed by : Masaomi Andō; Storyboarded by : Hiroyuki Fukushima	Shōji Yonemura	Satoshi Kimura	May 24, 2010	July 24, 2012
32	32	"Celestial Spirit King"; Transliteration: "Seirei Ō" (Japanese: 星霊王)	Directed by : Kyōhei Ishiguro; Storyboarded by : Shinji Ishihira	Fumihiko Shimo	Asako Inayoshi	May 31, 2010	July 31, 2012
Tower of Heaven Arc
33	33	"The Tower of Heaven"; Transliteration: "Rakuen no Tō" (Japanese: 楽園の塔)	Directed by : Hazuki Mizumoto; Storyboarded by : Shinji Ishihira	Atsuhiro Tomioka	Tomohiro Koyama	June 7, 2010	August 7, 2012
34	34	"Jellal"; Transliteration: "Jerāru" (Japanese: ジェラール)	Directed by : Eisuke Hayashi; Storyboarded by : Shinji Ishihira	Masashi Sogo	Takashi Uchida	June 21, 2010	August 14, 2012
35	35	"Voice of Darkness"; Transliteration: "Yami no Koe" (Japanese: 闇の声)	Directed by : Masaomi Andō; Storyboarded by : Shinji Ishihira	Shōji Yonemura	Kanta Suzuki	June 28, 2010	August 21, 2012
36	36	"Heaven's Game"; Transliteration: "Rakuen Gēmu" (Japanese: 楽園ゲーム)	Directed by : Shunichi Yoshizawa; Storyboarded by : Hiroyuki Fukushima	Atsuhiro Tomioka	Shinako Okayama	July 5, 2010	August 28, 2012
37	37	"Armor of the Heart"; Transliteration: "Kokoro no Yoroi" (Japanese: 心の鎧)	Kyōhei Ishiguro	Fumihiko Shimo	Yousuke Kabashima & Aki Nishizaki	July 12, 2010	September 4, 2012
38	38	"Destiny"; Transliteration: "Desutinī" (Japanese: 運命(デスティニー))	Directed by : Yusaku Saotome; Storyboarded by : Shinji Ishihira	Shōji Yonemura	Yuji Ushijima & Teruhiko Yamazaki	July 19, 2010	September 11, 2012
39	39	"Give Our Prayers to the Sacred Light"; Transliteration: "Sei Naru Hikari ni Inori o" (Japanese: 聖なる光に祈りを)	Hiroyuki Fukushima	Fumihiko Shimo	Toshiharu Murata	July 26, 2010	September 18, 2012
40	40	"Titania Falls"; Transliteration: "Titānia, Chiru" (Japanese: 妖精女王(ティターニア)、散る)	Takahiko Kyōgoku	Atsuhiro Tomioka	Satoshi Kimura	August 2, 2010	September 25, 2012
The Battle of Fairy Tail Arc
41	41	"Home"	Directed by : Eisuke Hayashi; Storyboarded by : Yoshiyuki Asai	Masashi Sogo	Kan Min Lee	August 9, 2010	October 2, 2012
42	42	"Battle of Fairy Tail"; Transliteration: "Batoru obu Fearī Teiru" (Japanese: バトル・オブ・フェアリーテイル)	Kyōhei Ishiguro	Shōji Yonemura	Asako Inayoshi	August 16, 2010	October 9, 2012
43	43	"Defeat Your Friends to Save Your Friends"; Transliteration: "Tomo no Tame ni Tomo o Ute" (Japanese: 友の為に友を討て)	Directed by : Daisuke Tsukushi; Storyboarded by : Hiroyuki Fukushima	Fumihiko Shimo	Mariko Ito	August 23, 2010	October 16, 2012
44	44	"Thunder Palace"; Transliteration: "Kaminari Den" (Japanese: 神鳴殿)	Directed by : Mamoru Enomoto; Storyboarded by : Hiroyuki Fukushima	Atsuhiro Tomioka	Tomoki Mizuno	August 30, 2010	October 23, 2012
45	45	"Advent of Satan"; Transliteration: "Satan Kōrin" (Japanese: サタン降臨)	Directed by : Hazuki Mizumoto; Storyboarded by : Shinji Ishihira	Masashi Sogo	Tomohiro Koyama	September 6, 2010	October 30, 2012
46	46	"Clash at Kardia Cathedral!"; Transliteration: "Gekitotsu! Karudia Daiseidō" (Japanese: 激突! カルディア大聖堂)	Directed by : Yusaku Saotome; Storyboarded by : Hiroyuki Fukushima	Shōji Yonemura	Yuji Ushijima & Erika Arakawa	September 13, 2010	November 6, 2012
47	47	"Triple Dragons"; Transliteration: "Toripuru Doragon" (Japanese: トリプル ドラゴン)	Directed by : Masaomi Andō & Kyōhei Ishiguro; Storyboarded by : Kyōhei Ishiguro	Fumihiko Shimo	Hirokazu Hisayuki	September 20, 2010	November 13, 2012
48	48	"Fantasia"; Transliteration: "Fantajia" (Japanese: 幻想曲(ファンタジア))	Directed by : Hiroyuki Fukushima; Storyboarded by : Shinji Ishihira	Masashi Sogo	Toshiharu Murata	September 27, 2010	November 20, 2012
49	49	"The Day of the Fateful Encounter"; Transliteration: "Unmei no Deai no Hi" (Japanese: 運命の出会いの日)	Naomichi Yamato	Masashi Sogo	Tomohiro Koyama	October 11, 2010	September 3, 2013
50	50	"Special Request: Watch Out for the Guy You Like!"; Transliteration: "Tokubetsu Irai. Kininaru Kare ni Chūi Seyo!" (Japanese: 特別依頼。気になる彼に注意せよ!)	Directed by : Yūji Yanase; Storyboarded by : Hiroyuki Fukushima	Masashi Sogo	Atsushi Soga	October 18, 2010	September 10, 2013
51	51	"Love & Lucky"	Directed by : Masaomi Andō; Storyboarded by : Hirokazu Hisayuki	Masashi Sogo	Hirokazu Hisayuki	October 25, 2010	September 17, 2013
Nirvana Arc
52	52	"Allied Forces, Assemble!"; Transliteration: "Rengōgun, Shūketsu!" (Japanese: 連合軍、集結!)	Yusaku Saotome	Masashi Sogo	Yuji Ushijima & Masanori Iizuka	November 1, 2010	September 24, 2013
53	53	"Enter the Oración Seis!"; Transliteration: "Orashion Seisu Arawaru!" (Japanese: 六魔将軍(オラシオンセイス)現る!)	Directed by : Eisuke Hayashi; Storyboarded by : Shinji Ishihira	Masashi Sogo	Kan Min Lee	November 8, 2010	October 1, 2013
54	54	"Maiden of the Sky"; Transliteration: "Tenkū no Miko" (Japanese: 天空の巫女)	Directed by : Noriaki Saito; Storyboarded by : Hiroyuki Fukushima	Fumihiko Shimo	Kang Won Kim & Jung-Duk Seo	November 15, 2010	October 8, 2013
55	55	"The Girl and the Ghost"; Transliteration: "Shōjo to Bōrei" (Japanese: 少女と亡霊)	Mamoru Enomoto	Shoji Yonemura	Takashi Uchida	November 22, 2010	October 15, 2013
56	56	"Dead Grand Prix"; Transliteration: "Deddo Guran Puri" (Japanese: デッドGP(グランプリ))	Directed by : Yusaku Saotome; Storyboarded by : Shinji Ishihira	Atsuhiro Tomioka	Yuji Ushijima & Masayuki Tanaka	November 29, 2010	October 22, 2013
57	57	"Darkness"; Transliteration: "Yami" (Japanese: 闇)	Naomichi Yamato	Masashi Sogo	Tomohiro Koyama	December 6, 2010	October 29, 2013
58	58	"Celestial Skirmish"; Transliteration: "Seirei Gassen" (Japanese: 星霊合戦)	Directed by : Masayuki Ōzeki; Storyboarded by : Shinji Ishihira	Fumihiko Shimo	Atsushi Soga	December 13, 2010	November 5, 2013
59	59	"Jellal of Days Gone By"; Transliteration: "Tsuioku no Jerāru" (Japanese: 追憶のジェラール)	Directed by : Eisuke Hayashi; Storyboarded by : Hiroyuki Fukushima	Masashi Sogo	Kan Min Lee	December 20, 2010	November 12, 2013
60	60	"March of Destruction"; Transliteration: "Hametsu no Kōshin" (Japanese: 破滅の行進)	Directed by : Masaomi Andō; Storyboarded by : Yoshiyuki Sanami	Shoji Yonemura	Hirokazu Hisayuki	December 27, 2010	November 19, 2013
61	61	"Super Aerial Battle: Natsu vs. Cobra!"; Transliteration: "Chōkūchūsen! Natsu bāsasu Kobura" (Japanese: 超空中戦! ナツ vs. コブラ)	Directed by : Hazuki Mizumoto; Storyboarded by : Shinji Ishihira	Atsuhiro Tomioka	Hiroki Ikeshita	January 10, 2011	November 26, 2013
62	62	"Wizard Saint Jura"; Transliteration: "Seiten no Jura" (Japanese: 聖十(せいてん)のジュラ)	Yusaku Saotome	Masashi Sogo	Yuji Ushijima & Masanori Iizuka	January 17, 2011	December 3, 2013
63	63	"Your Words"; Transliteration: "Kimi no Kotoba koso" (Japanese: 君の言葉こそ)	Directed by : Hiroshi Kimura; Storyboarded by : Hiroyuki Fukushima	Masashi Sogo	Seiji Kishimoto	January 24, 2011	December 10, 2013
64	64	"Zero" (Japanese: ゼロ)	Directed by : Yasuo Iwamoto; Storyboarded by : Shinji Ishihira	Masashi Sogo	Ryo Haga & Yūya Takahashi	January 31, 2011	December 17, 2013
65	65	"From Pegasus to Fairies"; Transliteration: "Tenma kara Yōsei-tachi e" (Japanese: 天馬から妖精たちへ)	Directed by : Masayuki Ōzeki; Storyboarded by : Hiroyuki Fukushima	Atsuhiro Tomioka	Atsushi Soga	February 7, 2011	December 24, 2013
66	66	"The Power of Feelings"; Transliteration: "Omoi no Chikara" (Japanese: 想いの力)	Naomichi Yamato	Fumihiko Shimo	Tomohiro Koyama	February 14, 2011	December 31, 2013
67	67	"I'm With You"; Transliteration: "Watashi ga Tsuiteiru" (Japanese: 私がついている)	Directed by : Eisuke Hayashi; Storyboarded by : Shinji Ishihira	Shoji Yonemura	Kan Min Lee	February 21, 2011	January 7, 2014
68	68	"A Guild for One"; Transliteration: "Tatta Hitori no Tame no Girudo" (Japanese: たった一人の為のギルド)	Yusaku Saotome	Masashi Sogo	Yuji Ushijima & Akiko Matsuo	February 28, 2011	January 14, 2014
Daphne Arc
69	69	"Call of the Dragon"; Transliteration: "Ryū no Izanai" (Japanese: 竜の誘い)	Directed by : Noriaki Saito; Storyboarded by : Hiroyuki Fukushima	Atsuhiro Tomioka	Seok Pyo Hong	March 7, 2011	January 21, 2014
70	70	"Natsu vs. Gray!!"; Transliteration: "Natsu bāsasu Gurei!!" (Japanese: ナツ vs. グレイ!!)	Directed by : Mamoru Enomoto; Storyboarded by : Hiroyuki Fukushima	Fumihiko Shimo	Hiroki Ikeshita	March 14, 2011	January 28, 2014
71	71	"Friendship Overcomes the Dead"; Transliteration: "Tomo wa Shikabane o Koete" (Japanese: 友は屍を越えて)	Masaomi Andō	Shoji Yonemura	Noriko Ogura	March 21, 2011	February 4, 2014
72	72	"A Fairy Tail Wizard"; Transliteration: "Fearī Teiru no Madōshi" (Japanese: フェアリーテイルの魔導士)	Directed by : Yasuo Iwamoto; Storyboarded by : Shinji Ishihira	Masashi Sogo	Yūya Takahashi & Kiryou Iwamoto	March 28, 2011	February 11, 2014
Standalone side stories
73	73	"Rainbow Cherry Blossoms"; Transliteration: "Niji no Sakura" (Japanese: 虹の桜)	Directed by : Naomichi Yamato; Storyboarded by : Shinji Ishihira	Masashi Sogo	Tomohiro Koyama	April 4, 2011	May 13, 2014
74	74	"Wendy's First Big Job!?"; Transliteration: "Wendi, Hajimete no Ōshigoto!?" (Japanese: ウェンディ、初めての大仕事!?)	Yusaku Saotome	Fumihiko Shimo	Yuji Ushijima & Masayuki Tanaka	April 11, 2011	May 20, 2014
75	75	"24-Hour Endurance Road Race"; Transliteration: "Nijūyon Jikan Taikyū Rōdo Rēsu" (Japanese: 24時間耐久ロードレース)	Directed by : Nanako Shimazaki; Storyboarded by : Hiroyuki Fukushima	Atsuhiro Tomioka	Karuta Sorashima	April 16, 2011	May 27, 2014
Edolas Arc
76	76	"Gildarts"; Transliteration: "Girudātsu" (Japanese: ギルダーツ)	Directed by : Masaomi Andō; Storyboarded by : Shinji Ishihira	Shoji Yonemura	Satoshi Hata	April 23, 2011	June 3, 2014
77	77	"Earth Land"; Transliteration: "Āsu Rando" (Japanese: アースランド)	Directed by : Tsuyoshi Tobita; Storyboarded by : Hiroyuki Fukushima	Masashi Sogo	Nobuharu Ishido	April 30, 2011	June 10, 2014
78	78	"Edolas"; Transliteration: "Edorasu" (Japanese: エドラス)	Directed by : Kazunobu Fuseki; Storyboarded by : Shinji Ishihira	Masashi Sogo	Hiroki Ikeshita	May 7, 2011	June 17, 2014
79	79	"Fairy Hunter"; Transliteration: "Yōsei Gari" (Japanese: 妖精狩り)	Directed by : Masaomi Andō; Storyboarded by : Shinji Ishihira	Masashi Sogo	Hirokazu Hisayuki	May 14, 2011	June 24, 2014
80	80	"Key of Hope"; Transliteration: "Kibō no Kagi" (Japanese: 希望の鍵)	Naomichi Yamato	Shoji Yonemura	Tomohiro Koyama	May 21, 2011	July 1, 2014
81	81	"Fireball"; Transliteration: "Faiabōru" (Japanese: ファイアボール)	Directed by : Noriaki Saito; Storyboarded by : Hiroyuki Fukushima	Fumihiko Shimo	Suk Pyo Song & Ryo Haga	May 28, 2011	July 8, 2014
82	82	"Welcome Home"; Transliteration: "Okaerinasaimase" (Japanese: おかえりなさいませ)	Kan Min Lee	Atsuhiro Tomioka	Toshiharu Murata	June 4, 2011	July 15, 2014
83	83	"Extalia"; Transliteration: "Ekusutaria" (Japanese: エクスタリア)	Directed by : Hiroshi Kimura; Storyboarded by : Hiroyuki Fukushima	Masashi Sogo	Eiichi Tokura & Hiromi Sakamoto	June 11, 2011	July 22, 2014
84	84	"Fly, to Our Friends!"; Transliteration: "Tobe! Tomo no Moto ni!" (Japanese: 飛べ! 友のもとに!)	Directed by : Yusaku Saotome; Storyboarded by : Shinji Ishihira	Masashi Sogo	Yuji Ushijima & Akiko Matsuo	June 18, 2011	July 29, 2014
85	85	"Code ETD"; Transliteration: "Kōdo Ī-Tī-Dī" (Japanese: コードETD)	Directed by : Nanako Shimazaki; Storyboarded by : Susumu Nishizawa	Fumihiko Shimo	Seiji Kishimoto	June 25, 2011	August 5, 2014
86	86	"Erza vs. Erza"; Transliteration: "Eruza bāsasu Eruza" (Japanese: エルザ vs. エルザ)	Directed by : Mamoru Enomoto; Storyboarded by : Hiroyuki Fukushima	Atsuhiro Tomioka	Satoshi Hata	July 2, 2011	August 12, 2014
87	87	"We're Talking About Lives Here!!!!"; Transliteration: "Inochi Darō ga!!!!" (Japanese: 命だろーが!!!!)	Directed by : Tsuyoshi Tobita; Storyboarded by : Hiroyuki Fukushima	Shoji Yonemura	Nobuharu Ishido	July 9, 2011	August 19, 2014
88	88	"For Pride's Sake, the River of Stars"; Transliteration: "Hoshi no Taiga wa Hokori no Tame ni" (Japanese: 星の大河は誇りの為に)	Directed by : Kazunobu Fuseki; Storyboarded by : Shinji Ishihira	Masashi Sogo	Hiroki Ikeshita	July 16, 2011	August 26, 2014
89	89	"The Apocalyptic Dragon Chain Cannon"; Transliteration: "Shūen no Ryūsahō" (Japanese: 終焉の竜鎖砲)	Directed by : Yasuo Iwamoto; Storyboarded by : Shinji Ishihira	Masashi Sogo	Kiryou Iwamoto & Seok Pyo Hong	July 23, 2011	September 2, 2014
90	90	"The Boy Back Then"; Transliteration: "Ano Toki no Shōnen" (Japanese: あの時の少年)	Masaomi Andō	Masashi Sogo	Kenji Hattori	July 30, 2011	September 9, 2014
91	91	"Dragon Sense"	Directed by : Yoshitaka Makino; Storyboarded by : Shinji Ishihira	Shoji Yonemura	Jun Hanzawa, Osamu Ōkubo & Masahiro Sekiguchi	August 6, 2011	September 16, 2014
92	92	"O Living Ones"; Transliteration: "Ikiru Monotachi yo" (Japanese: 生きる者たちよ)	Directed by : Hiroshi Tamada; Storyboarded by : Hiroyuki Fukushima	Fumihiko Shimo	Hyung Woo Shin & Michinori Shiga	August 13, 2011	September 23, 2014
93	93	"I'm Standing Right Here"; Transliteration: "Ore wa Koko ni Tatteiru" (Japanese: オレはここに立っている)	Naomichi Yamato	Atsuhiro Tomioka	Tomohiro Koyama	August 20, 2011	September 30, 2014
94	94	"Bye-Bye Edolas"; Transliteration: "Baibai Edorasu" (Japanese: バイバイ エドラス)	Directed by : Mamoru Enomoto; Storyboarded by : Yoshiyuki Asai	Masashi Sogo	Satoshi Hata	August 27, 2011	October 7, 2014
95	95	"Lisanna"; Transliteration: "Risāna" (Japanese: リサーナ)	Directed by : Kazunobu Fuseki; Storyboarded by : Shinji Ishihira	Masashi Sogo	Hiroki Ikeshita	September 3, 2011	October 14, 2014
Tenrou Island Arc
96	96	"He Who Extinguishes Life"; Transliteration: "Inochi o Kesumono" (Japanese: 生命(いのち)を消す者)	Directed by : Tsuyoshi Tobita; Storyboarded by : Shinji Ishihira	Masashi Sogo	Nobuharu Ishido	September 10, 2011	October 21, 2014
97	97	"Best Partners"; Transliteration: "Besuto Pātonā" (Japanese: ベストパートナー)	Directed by : Shunichi Yoshizawa; Storyboarded by : Shinji Ishihira	Masashi Sogo	Takashi Uchida	September 17, 2011	October 28, 2014
98	98	"Who's the Lucky One?"; Transliteration: "Ungaii no wa Dare?" (Japanese: 運がいいのは誰?)	Directed by : Yusaku Saotome; Storyboarded by : Hiroyuki Fukushima	Masashi Sogo	Yuji Ushijima & Akiko Matsuo	September 24, 2011	November 4, 2014
99	99	"Natsu vs. Gildarts"; Transliteration: "Natsu bāsasu Girudātsu" (Japanese: ナツ vs. ギルダーツ)	Directed by : Noriaki Saito; Storyboarded by : Shinji Ishihira	Masashi Sogo	Kōsuke Yoshida & Ryo Haga	October 1, 2011	November 11, 2014
100	100	"Mest"; Transliteration: "Mesuto" (Japanese: メスト)	Directed by : Yasushi Muroya; Storyboarded by : Hiroyuki Fukushima	Shoji Yonemura	Shiori Mikuni	October 8, 2011	November 18, 2014
101	101	"Black Wizard"; Transliteration: "Kuro Madōshi" (Japanese: 黒魔導士)	Directed by : Hiroshi Kimura; Storyboarded by : Shinji Ishihira	Fumihiko Shimo	Seiji Kishimoto	October 15, 2011	November 25, 2014
102	102	"Iron Soul"; Transliteration: "Tetsu no Tamashii" (Japanese: 鉄の魂)	Masaomi Andō	Atsuhiro Tomioka	Masanori Iizuka	October 22, 2011	December 2, 2014
103	103	"Makarov Charges"; Transliteration: "Shingeki no Makarofu" (Japanese: 進撃のマカロフ)	Naomichi Yamato	Masashi Sogo	Tomohiro Koyama	October 29, 2011	December 9, 2014
104	104	"Lost Magic"; Transliteration: "Rosuto Majikku" (Japanese: 失われた魔法(ロスト・マジック))	Directed by : Hirokazu Yamada; Storyboarded by : Shinji Ishihira	Atsuhiro Tomioka	Jun Hanzawa	November 5, 2011	December 16, 2014
105	105	"Fire Dragon vs. Flame God"; Transliteration: "Karyū bāsasu Enjin" (Japanese: 火竜 vs. 炎神)	Directed by : Tsuyoshi Tobita; Storyboarded by : Shinji Ishihira	Fumihiko Shimo	Nobuharu Ishido	November 12, 2011	December 23, 2014
106	106	"Grand Magic World"; Transliteration: "Dai Mahō Sekai" (Japanese: 大魔法世界)	Directed by : Kazunobu Fuseki; Storyboarded by : Yoshiyuki Asai	Shoji Yonemura	Hiroki Ikeshita	November 19, 2011	December 30, 2014
107	107	"Arc of Embodiment"; Transliteration: "Gugen no Āku" (Japanese: 具現のアーク)	Masaomi Andō	Atsuhiro Tomioka	Masanori Iizuka	November 26, 2011	January 6, 2015
108	108	"Human Gate"; Transliteration: "Ningen no Tobira" (Japanese: 人間の扉)	Directed by : Yusaku Saotome; Storyboarded by : Shinji Ishihira	Fumihiko Shimo	Yuji Ushijima, Takahisa Ichikawa & Naomi Yoshida	December 3, 2011	January 13, 2015
109	109	"Lucy Fire"; Transliteration: "Rūshii Faia" (Japanese: ルーシィファイア)	Directed by : Yasuo Iwamoto; Storyboarded by : Shinji Ishihira	Shoji Yonemura	Yūya Takahashi	December 10, 2011	January 20, 2015
110	110	"Dead-End of Despair"; Transliteration: "Zetsubō no Fukurokōji" (Japanese: 絶望の袋小路)	Directed by : Qzo; Storyboarded by : Hiroyuki Fukushima	Masashi Sogo	Atsushi Soga	December 17, 2011	January 27, 2015
111	111	"Tears of Love and Vitality"; Transliteration: "Ai to Katsuryoku no Namida" (Japanese: 愛と活力の涙)	Directed by : Hirokazu Yamada; Storyboarded by : Hiroyuki Fukushima	Atsuhiro Tomioka	Jun Hanzawa & Masahiro Sekiguchi	December 24, 2011	February 3, 2015
112	112	"The One Thing I Couldn't Say"; Transliteration: "Ienakatta Hitokoto" (Japanese: 言えなかった一言)	Directed by : Mamoru Enomoto; Storyboarded by : Shinji Ishihira	Shoji Yonemura	Tomohiro Koyama	January 7, 2012	February 10, 2015
113	113	"Tenrou Tree"; Transliteration: "Tenrōju" (Japanese: 天狼樹(てんろうじゅ))	Tsuyoshi Tobita	Fumihiko Shimo	Nobuharu Ishido & Kazuyuki Ikai	January 14, 2012	February 17, 2015
114	114	"Erza vs. Azuma"; Transliteration: "Eruza bāsasu Azuma" (Japanese: エルザ vs. アズマ)	Directed by : Masaomi Andō; Storyboarded by : Yoshiyuki Asai	Masashi Sogo	Hiroki Ikeshita	January 21, 2012	February 24, 2015
115	115	"Freezing Fighting Spirit"; Transliteration: "Kogoeru Tōshi" (Japanese: 凍える闘志)	Directed by : Yūsuke Onoda; Storyboarded by : Hiroyuki Fukushima	Masashi Sogo	Shinya Ojiri	January 28, 2012	March 3, 2015
116	116	"Power of Life"; Transliteration: "Seinaru Chikara" (Japanese: 生なる力)	Directed by : Noriaki Saito; Storyboarded by : Shinji Ishihira	Masashi Sogo	Seok Pyo Hong & Won Hee Cho	February 4, 2012	March 10, 2015
117	117	"Rolling Thunder"; Transliteration: "Raimei Hibiku" (Japanese: 雷鳴響く)	Directed by : Yusaku Saotome; Storyboarded by : Hiroyuki Fukushima	Masashi Sogo	Yuji Ushijima & Naomi Yoshida	February 11, 2012	March 17, 2015
118	118	"The Man Without an Emblem"; Transliteration: "Monshō o Kizamanu Otoko" (Japanese: 紋章を刻まぬ男)	Directed by : Hazuki Mizumoto; Storyboarded by : Shinji Ishihira	Masashi Sogo	Tomohiro Koyama	February 18, 2012	March 24, 2015
119	119	"Realm of the Abyss"; Transliteration: "Shin'en no Ryōiki" (Japanese: 深淵の領域)	Directed by : Yasuo Iwamoto; Storyboarded by : Hiroyuki Fukushima	Masashi Sogo	Kōsuke Yoshida & Ryo Haga	February 25, 2012	March 31, 2015
120	120	"Daybreak on Tenrou Island"; Transliteration: "Akatsuki no Tenrō Jima" (Japanese: 暁の天狼島)	Directed by : Qzo; Storyboarded by : Shinji Ishihira	Masashi Sogo	Atsushi Soga	March 2, 2012	April 7, 2015
121	121	"The Right to Love"; Transliteration: "Aisuru Shikaku" (Japanese: 愛する資格)	Directed by : Hirokazu Yamada; Storyboarded by : Hiroyuki Fukushima	Masashi Sogo	Jun Hanzawa	March 9, 2012	April 14, 2015
122	122	"Let's Hold Hands"; Transliteration: "Te o Tsunagō" (Japanese: 手をつなごう)	Masaomi Andō	Masashi Sogo	Masanori Iizuka	March 16, 2012	April 21, 2015
Key of the Starry Heavens Arc
123	123	"Fairy Tail, Year X791"; Transliteration: "Nanahyaku-kyūjūichi-nen: Fearī Teiru" (Japanese: X791年・妖精の尻尾(フェアリーテイル))	Directed by : Mamoru Enomoto; Storyboarded by : Shinji Ishihira	Masashi Sogo	Hiroki Ikeshita	March 23, 2012	April 28, 2015
124	124	"The Seven Year Gap"; Transliteration: "Kūhaku no Nana-nen" (Japanese: 空白の7年)	Directed by : Kazunobu Fuseki; Storyboarded by : Shinji Ishihira	Masashi Sogo	Tomohiro Koyama	March 31, 2012	May 5, 2015
125	125	"The Magic Ball"; Transliteration: "Mahō Butōkai" (Japanese: 魔法舞踏会)	Directed by : Tsuyoshi Tobita; Storyboarded by : Hiroyuki Fukushima	Shoji Yonemura	Nobuharu Ishido	April 7, 2012	May 12, 2015
126	126	"True Scoundrels – The Butt Jiggle Gang"; Transliteration: "Shin no Waruketsupuri-dan" (Japanese: 真の悪(ワル)ケツプリ団)	Directed by : Yasuyuki Fuse; Storyboarded by : Yoshiyuki Asai	Atsuhiro Tomioka	Tatsunori Sakamoto & Kōsuke Yoshida	April 14, 2012	May 19, 2015
127	127	"The Terror of Invisible Lucy!"; Transliteration: "Tōmei Rūshii no Kyōfu!" (Japanese: 透明ルーシィの恐怖!)	Directed by : Noriaki Saito; Storyboarded by : Hiroyuki Fukushima	Fumihiko Shimo	Kōsuke Yoshida	April 21, 2012	June 2, 2015
128	128	"Father's Memento"; Transliteration: "Chichi no Ihin" (Japanese: 父の遺品)	Directed by : Hitomi Ezoe; Storyboarded by : Shinji Ishihira	Atsuhiro Tomioka	Emi Honda & Nobuhiko Kawakami	April 28, 2012	June 9, 2015
129	129	"Turbulent Showdown! Natsu vs. Laxus"; Transliteration: "Dotō no Taiketsu! Natsu bāsasu Rakusasu" (Japanese: 怒涛の対決! ナツ vs. ラクサス)	Directed by : Yūsuke Onoda; Storyboarded by : Hiroyuki Fukushima	Shoji Yonemura	Shigenori Taniguchi & Mikio Fujiwara	May 5, 2012	June 16, 2015
130	130	"Target: Lucy"; Transliteration: "Nerawa-reta Rūshii" (Japanese: 狙われたルーシィ)	Directed by : Yasuo Iwamoto; Storyboarded by : Shinji Ishihira	Fumihiko Shimo	Yūya Takahashi & Kōsuke Yoshida	May 12, 2012	June 23, 2015
131	131	"The Fury of Legion"; Transliteration: "Region no Mōi" (Japanese: レギオンの猛威)	Directed by : Naomichi Yamato; Storyboarded by : Yoshiyuki Asai	Masashi Sogo	Masanori Iizuka	May 19, 2012	June 30, 2015
132	132	"Key of the Starry Heavens"; Transliteration: "Hoshizora no Kagi" (Japanese: 星空の鍵)	Directed by : Kazunobu Fuseki; Storyboarded by : Shinji Ishihira	Atsuhiro Tomioka	Tomohiro Koyama	May 26, 2012	July 7, 2015
133	133	"Travel Companions"; Transliteration: "Tabi no Nakama-tachi" (Japanese: 旅の仲間たち)	Directed by : Yoshihisa Matsumoto; Storyboarded by : Hiroyuki Fukushima	Masashi Sogo	Kenichiro Suzuki	June 2, 2012	July 14, 2015
134	134	"Labyrinth Capriccio"; Transliteration: "Meikyū Kyōsōkyoku" (Japanese: 迷宮狂想曲)	Directed by : Yusaku Saotome; Storyboarded by : Shinji Ishihira	Shoji Yonemura	Sadahiko Sakamaki, Kenji Hattori & Yuji Ushijima	June 9, 2012	July 21, 2015
135	135	"Footprints of the Myth"; Transliteration: "Shinwa no Ashiato" (Japanese: 神話の足跡)	Directed by : Mamoru Enomoto; Storyboarded by : Hiroyuki Fukushima	Fumihiko Shimo	Hiroki Ikeshita	June 16, 2012	July 28, 2015
136	136	"True Scoundrels, Once Again"; Transliteration: "Shin no Waru, Futatabi" (Japanese: 真の悪(ワル)、ふたたび)	Noriaki Saito	Atsuhiro Tomioka	Emi Kōno & Ryo Haga	June 23, 2012	August 4, 2015
137	137	"Defying Calculation"; Transliteration: "Keisan o Koeru Mono" (Japanese: 計算をこえるもの)	Directed by : Tsuyoshi Tobita; Storyboarded by : Hiroyuki Fukushima	Fumihiko Shimo	Nobuharu Ishido	June 30, 2012	August 11, 2015
138	138	"The Course of the Holy War"; Transliteration: "Seisen no Yukue" (Japanese: 聖戦のゆくえ)	Directed by : Masaomi Andō; Storyboarded by : Shinji Ishihira	Shoji Yonemura	Masanori Iizuka	July 7, 2012	August 18, 2015
139	139	"Time Begins to Tick"; Transliteration: "Ugoki Hajimeta Toki" (Japanese: 動き始めた刻(とき))	Directed by : Yasuyuki Fuse; Storyboarded by : Shinji Ishihira	Masashi Sogo	Hyun Woo Ju & Won Hee Cho	July 14, 2012	August 25, 2015
140	140	"Enter the Neo-Oración Seis!"; Transliteration: "Shinsei Orashion Seisu Genru!" (Japanese: 新生六魔将軍(オラシオンセイス)現る!)	Directed by : Yūsuke Onoda; Storyboarded by : Shinji Ishihira	Atsuhiro Tomioka	Mikio Fujiwara & Masatsugu Yamamoto	July 21, 2012	September 1, 2015
141	141	"Get the Infinity Clock!"; Transliteration: "Mugen Tokei o Oe!" (Japanese: 無限時計を追え!)	Directed by : Yoshihisa Matsumoto; Storyboarded by : Hiroyuki Fukushima	Fumihiko Shimo	Konomi Sakurai	July 28, 2012	September 8, 2015
142	142	"Dissonance of Battle"; Transliteration: "Tatakai no Fukyōwaon" (Japanese: 戦いの不協和音)	Directed by : Hitomi Ezoe; Storyboarded by : Hiroyuki Fukushima	Masashi Sogo	Tomohiro Koyama	August 4, 2012	September 15, 2015
143	143	"Anti-Link"; Transliteration: "Anchi Rinku" (Japanese: アンチリンク)	Directed by : Yasuo Iwamoto; Storyboarded by : Shinji Ishihira	Shoji Yonemura	Hiroko Kūrube	August 11, 2012	September 22, 2015
144	144	"Despair Unleashed"; Transliteration: "Tokihanata-reta Zetsubō" (Japanese: 解き放たれた絶望)	Directed by : Kazunobu Fuseki; Storyboarded by : Shinji Ishihira	Fumihiko Shimo	Masato Numazu	August 18, 2012	September 29, 2015
145	145	"Real Nightmare"; Transliteration: "Riaru Naitomea" (Japanese: リアルナイトメア)	Directed by : Mamoru Enomoto; Storyboarded by : Hiroyuki Fukushima	Atsuhiro Tomioka	Hiroki Ikeshita	August 25, 2012	October 6, 2015
146	146	"Time Spiral"; Transliteration: "Toki no Supairaru" (Japanese: 時のスパイラル)	Noriaki Saito	Shoji Yonemura	Ryo Haga & Jiemon Futsuzawa	September 1, 2012	October 13, 2015
147	147	"To the Infinity Castle!"; Transliteration: "Mugenjō e!" (Japanese: 無限城へ!)	Directed by : Tsuyoshi Tobita; Storyboarded by : Hiroyuki Fukushima	Shoji Yonemura	Nobuharu Ishido	September 8, 2012	October 20, 2015
148	148	"Angel Tears"; Transliteration: "Tenshi no Namida" (Japanese: 天使の涙)	Directed by : Yūsuke Onoda; Storyboarded by : Shinji Ishihira	Atsuhiro Tomioka	Mikio Fujiwara & Masatsugu Yamamoto	September 15, 2012	October 27, 2015
149	149	"I Hear the Voice of My Friend"; Transliteration: "Tomo no Koe ga Kikoeru" (Japanese: 友の声が聴こえる)	Directed by : Yasuyuki Fuse; Storyboarded by : Shinji Ishihira	Fumihiko Shimo	Hiroko Kūrube	September 22, 2012	November 3, 2015
150	150	"Lucy and Michelle"; Transliteration: "Rūshii to Missheru" (Japanese: ルーシィとミッシェル)	Directed by : Junichi Wada; Storyboarded by : Shinji Ishihira	Masashi Sogo	Masanori Iizuka	September 29, 2012	November 10, 2015
Grand Magic Games Arc
151	151	"Sabertooth"; Transliteration: "Seibātūsu" (Japanese: 剣咬の虎(セイバートゥース))	Directed by : Kazunobu Fuseki; Storyboarded by : Shinji Ishihira & Hiroyuki Fukushima	Masashi Sogo	Tomohiro Koyama	October 6, 2012	November 17, 2015
152	152	"And So We Aim for the Top"; Transliteration: "Soshite Ore-tachi wa Chōjō o Mezasu" (Japanese: そしてオレたちは頂上を目指す)	Directed by : Shigetaka Ikeda; Storyboarded by : Hiroyuki Fukushima	Masashi Sogo	Yuji Ushijima & Katsunori Kikuchi	October 13, 2012	November 24, 2015
153	153	"Song of the Stars"; Transliteration: "Hoshiboshi no Uta" (Japanese: 星々の歌)	Directed by : Yoshihiro Takamoto; Storyboarded by : Hiroyuki Fukushima	Masashi Sogo	Noriko Ogura	October 20, 2012	December 1, 2015
154	154	"For All the Time We Missed Each Other"; Transliteration: "Surechigatta Jikan no Bun Dake" (Japanese: すれ違った時間の分だけ)	Noriaki Saito	Shoji Yonemura	Masaaki Yamamoto & Jiemon Futsuzawa	October 27, 2012	December 8, 2015
155	155	"Crocus, the Flower-Blooming Capital"; Transliteration: "Hanasaku Miyako: Kurokkasu" (Japanese: 花咲く都・クロッカス)	Mamoru Enomoto	Shoji Yonemura	Hiroki Ikeshita	November 3, 2012	December 15, 2015
156	156	"Sky Labyrinth"; Transliteration: "Sukai Rabirinsu" (Japanese: 空中迷宮(スカイラビリンス))	Directed by : Tsuyoshi Tobita; Storyboarded by : Shinji Ishihira	Atsuhiro Tomioka	Nobuharu Ishido	November 10, 2012	December 22, 2015
157	157	"New Guild"; Transliteration: "Shinki Girudo" (Japanese: 新規ギルド)	Directed by : Yūsuke Onoda; Storyboarded by : Susumu Nishizawa	Atsuhiro Tomioka	Masatsugu Yamamoto & Mikio Fujiwara	November 17, 2012	December 29, 2015
158	158	"Night of Shooting Stars"; Transliteration: "Hoshifuru Yoru ni" (Japanese: 星降(ホシフ)ル夜ニ)	Directed by : Kazunobu Shimizu; Storyboarded by : Hiroyuki Fukushima	Fumihiko Shimo	Masakazu Yamagishi	November 24, 2012	January 5, 2016
159	159	"Lucy vs. Flare"; Transliteration: "Rūshii bāsasu Furea" (Japanese: ルーシィ vs. フレア)	Directed by : Kazunobu Fuseki; Storyboarded by : Shinji Ishihira	Fumihiko Shimo	Tomohiro Koyama	December 1, 2012	January 12, 2016
160	160	"Portent"; Transliteration: "Kyōzui" (Japanese: 凶瑞)	Yasuo Iwamoto	Atsuhiro Tomioka	Hiroko Kūrube	December 8, 2012	January 19, 2016
161	161	"Chariots"; Transliteration: "Chariotto" (Japanese: 戦車(チャリオット))	Directed by : Shigetaka Ikeda; Storyboarded by : Hiroyuki Fukushima	Shoji Yonemura	Yuji Ushijima, Katsunori Kikuchi & Kenji Hattori	December 15, 2012	January 26, 2016
162	162	"Elfman vs. Bacchus"; Transliteration: "Erufuman bāsasu Bakkasu" (Japanese: エルフマン vs. バッカス)	Directed by : Yoshihisa Matsumoto; Storyboarded by : Shinji Ishihira	Masashi Sogo	Masanori Iizuka	December 22, 2012	—
163	163	"Mirajane vs. Jenny"; Transliteration: "Mirajēn bāsasu Jenī" (Japanese: ミラジェーン vs. ジェニー)	Noriaki Saito	Fumihiko Shimo	Jiemon Futsuzawa & Masaaki Yamamoto	January 5, 2013	—
164	164	"Kagura vs. Yukino"; Transliteration: "Kagura bāsasu Yukino" (Japanese: カグラ vs. ユキノ)	Directed by : Kazunobu Fuseki; Storyboarded by : Shinji Ishihira	Shoji Yonemura	Masato Numazu	January 12, 2013	—
165	165	"Hatred at Nightfall"; Transliteration: "Urami wa Yoru no Tobari ni Tsutsumarete" (Japanese: 怨みは夜の帳に包まれて)	Directed by : Tsuyoshi Tobita; Storyboarded by : Hiroyuki Fukushima	Masashi Sogo	Nobuharu Ishido	January 19, 2013	—
166	166	"Pandemonium"; Transliteration: "Pandemoniumu" (Japanese: 伏魔殿(パンデモニウム))	Hiroyuki Fukushima	Fumihiko Shimo	Hiroki Ikeshita	January 26, 2013	—
167	167	"100 Against 1"; Transliteration: "Hyaku tai Ichi" (Japanese: 100対1)	Directed by : Kazunobu Shimizu; Storyboarded by : Shinji Ishihira	Atsuhiro Tomioka	Masakazu Yamagishi	February 2, 2013	—
168	168	"Laxus vs. Alexei"; Transliteration: "Rakusasu bāsasu Arekusei" (Japanese: ラクサス vs. アレクセイ)	Directed by : Yoshihisa Matsumoto; Storyboarded by : Hiroyuki Fukushima	Shoji Yonemura	Tomohiro Koyama	February 9, 2013	—
169	169	"Wendy vs. Shelia"; Transliteration: "Wendi bāsasu Sheria" (Japanese: ウェンディ vs. シェリア)	Directed by : Yasuo Iwamoto; Storyboarded by : Shinji Ishihira	Atsuhiro Tomioka	Hiroko Kūrube	February 16, 2013	—
170	170	"Small Fists"; Transliteration: "Chiisana Kobushi" (Japanese: 小さな拳)	Directed by : Hazuki Mizumoto; Storyboarded by : Hiroyuki Fukushima	Masashi Sogo	Futoshi Higashide	February 23, 2013	—
171	171	"Naval Battle"; Transliteration: "Nabaru Batoru" (Japanese: 海戦(ナバルバトル))	Noriaki Saito	Fumihiko Shimo	Jiemon Futsuzawa	March 2, 2013	—
172	172	"A Parfum for You"; Transliteration: "Kimi ni Sasageru Parufamu" (Japanese: 君に捧げる香り(パルファム))	Directed by : Mamoru Enomoto; Storyboarded by : Hiroyuki Fukushima	Shoji Yonemura	Tomohiro Koyama	March 9, 2013	—
173	173	"Battle of Dragon Slayers"; Transliteration: "Batoru obu Doragon Sureiyā" (Japanese: バトル・オブ・ドラゴンスレイヤー)	Junichi Wada	Fumihiko Shimo	Masanori Iizuka	March 16, 2013	—
174	174	"Four Dragons"; Transliteration: "Yonin no Doragon" (Japanese: 四人の竜(ドラゴン))	Directed by : Tsuyoshi Tobita; Storyboarded by : Shinji Ishihira	Atsuhiro Tomioka	Nobuharu Ishido	March 23, 2013	—
175	175	"Natsu vs. the Twin Dragons"; Transliteration: "Natsu bāsasu Sōryū" (Japanese: ナツ vs. 双竜)	Directed by : Kazunobu Fuseki; Storyboarded by : Shinji Ishihira	Masashi Sogo	Hiroki Ikeshita	March 30, 2013	—

=== Season 2 (2014–16) ===
No. overall	No. in season	Title	Directed by	Written by	Animation directed by	Original release date
Grand Magic Games Arc (continued)
176	1	"King of the Dragons"; Transliteration: "Ryū no Ō" (Japanese: 竜の王)	Directed by : Kazunobu Fuseki; Storyboarded by : Shinji Ishihira	Masashi Sogo	Akihiko Sano & Hiroshi Imaoka	April 5, 2014
177	2	"The Eclipse Project"; Transliteration: "Ekuripusu Keikaku" (Japanese: エクリプス計画)	Directed by : Tokumoto Yoshinobu; Storyboarded by : Shinji Ishihira	Masashi Sogo	Yumiko Ishii, Miyuki Honda & Masato Hagiwara	April 12, 2014
178	3	"Fairy Tactician"; Transliteration: "Yōsei Gunshi" (Japanese: 妖精軍師)	Directed by : Osamu Sekita; Storyboarded by : Shinji Ishihira	Shōji Yonemura	Masahiko Itoshima, Kenji Hattori, Yuji; Shibata, Eri Ishikawa & Isamu Fukushima	April 19, 2014
179	4	"Gray vs. Rufus"; Transliteration: "Gurei bāsasu Rūfasu" (Japanese: グレイ vs. ルーファス)	Directed by : Kazunobu Shimizu; Storyboarded by : Shinji Ishihira	Atsuhiro Tomioka	Heo Gi Dong & Shoji Endo	April 26, 2014
180	5	"The Hungry Wolf Knights"; Transliteration: "Garō Kishidan" (Japanese: 餓狼騎士団)	Directed by : Akira Kato; Storyboarded by : Shinji Ishihira	Fumihiko Shimo	Akihiko Sano, Haruka Santo & Masahiko Inuzuka	May 3, 2014
181	6	"Fairy Tail vs. Executioners"; Transliteration: "Fearī Teiru bāsasu Shokeinin" (Japanese: FT(フェアリーテイル) vs. 処刑人)	Directed by : Yoshitaka Fujimoto; Storyboarded by : Shinji Ishihira	Fumihiko Shimo	Shingo Fujisaki	May 10, 2014
182	7	"Scorching Earth"; Transliteration: "Moeru Daichi" (Japanese: 燃える大地)	Directed by : Mitsuto Yamaji; Storyboarded by : Shinji Ishihira	Masashi Sogo	Yoshifumi Mori & Kazuko Tadano	May 17, 2014
183	8	"Our Place"; Transliteration: "Ore-tachi no Iru Basho" (Japanese: オレたちのいる国(ばしょ))	Directed by : Tobita Tsuyoshi; Storyboarded by : Shinji Ishihira	Shōji Yonemura	Takashi Koizumi & Katsusuke Shimizu	May 24, 2014
184	9	"The Kingdom 'til Tomorrow"; Transliteration: "Ashita Made no Kuni" (Japanese: 明日までの国)	Directed by : Fumio Ito; Storyboarded by : Shinji Ishihira	Atsuhiro Tomioka	Masahiko Itoshima, Masahiko Inuzuka & Haruka Saneto	May 31, 2014
185	10	"Erza vs. Kagura"; Transliteration: "Eruza bāsasu Kagura" (Japanese: エルザ vs. カグラ)	Directed by : Tokumoto Yoshinobu; Storyboarded by : Shinji Ishihira	Masashi Sogo	See note for the ADs (Note: Masato Hagiwara, Yumiko Ishii, Aki Yamauchi, Miki Takahashi, Yoshiko Takemoto & Mayumi Funakoshi)	June 7, 2014
186	11	"A Future Racing Toward Despair"; Transliteration: "Zetsubō e Kasoku suru Mirai" (Japanese: 絶望へ加速する未来)	Directed by : Hiroshi Kimura; Storyboarded by : Kazunobu Fuseki	Fumihiko Shimo	Masahiko Matsuo & Natsuko Suzuki	June 14, 2014
187	12	"Frog"; Transliteration: "Kaeru" (Japanese: カエル)	Directed by : Kazunobu Shimizu; Storyboarded by : Shinji Ishihira	Atsuhiro Tomioka	Heo Gi Dong & Shoji Endo	June 21, 2014
188	13	"Roaring Thunder!"; Transliteration: "Gekirai!" (Japanese: 激雷!)	Directed by : Osamu Sekita; Storyboarded by : Shinji Ishihira	Shōji Yonemura	Masahiko Itoshima, Etsushi Okabe & Kenichi Takase	June 28, 2014
189	14	"Gloria"	Directed by : Yoshitaka Fujimoto; Storyboarded by : Masami Shimoda	Fumihiko Shimo	Shingo Fujisaki	July 5, 2014
190	15	"The One Who Closes the Gate"; Transliteration: "Tobira o Shimeru Mono" (Japanese: 扉を閉めるもの)	Directed by : Fumio Ito; Storyboarded by : Shinji Ishihira	Atsuhiro Tomioka	Masahiko Inuzuka & Haruka Saneto	July 12, 2014
191	16	"Natsu vs. Rogue"; Transliteration: "Natsu bāsasu Rōgu" (Japanese: ナツ vs. ローグ)	Directed by : Daiki Fukuoka; Storyboarded by : Shinji Ishihira	Shōji Yonemura	Masanori Iizuka & Ryu Seizo	July 19, 2014
192	17	"For Me, Too"; Transliteration: "Atashi no Bun made" (Japanese: あたしの分まで)	Directed by : Akira Kato; Storyboarded by : Yasuhiro Tanabe	Masashi Sogo	Isamu Fukushima & Masahiko Itoshima	July 26, 2014
193	18	"Seven Dragons"	Directed by : Mitsuto Yamaji; Storyboarded by : Jin Inai	Fumihiko Shimo	See note for the ADs (Note: Etsushi Mori, Mari Shirakawa, Toshiyoshi Sasaki, Yuri Yasuki, Takuro Sakurai & Minoru Okabe)	August 2, 2014
194	19	"Zirconis' Magic"; Transliteration: "Jirukonisu no Mahō" (Japanese: ジルコニスの魔法)	Directed by : Yoshitaka Fujimoto; Storyboarded by : Shinji Ishihira	Atsuhiro Tomioka	Shingo Fujisaki	August 9, 2014
195	20	"People and People, Dragons and Dragons, People and Dragons"; Transliteration: "Hito to Hito, Ryū to Ryū, Hito to Ryū" (Japanese: 人と人､ 竜と竜､ 人と竜)	Directed by : Yuji Suzuki; Storyboarded by : Yasuhiro Tanabe	Shōji Yonemura	Masanori Iizuka, Masahiko Inuzuka & Haruka Saneto	August 16, 2014
196	21	"Sin and Sacrifice"; Transliteration: "Tsumi to Gisei" (Japanese: 罪と犠牲)	Directed by : Kazunobu Shimizu; Storyboarded by : Nobuhiro Kondo	Masashi Sogo	Heo Gi Dong, Shoji Endo & Mikio Shiiba	August 23, 2014
197	22	"Time of Life"; Transliteration: "Inochi no Jikan" (Japanese: 命の時間)	Directed by : Osamu Sekita; Storyboarded by : Tsukasa Sunaga	Fumihiko Shimo	Masahiko Itoshima, Minoru Okabe, Isamu Fukushima & Yuri Anki	August 30, 2014
198	23	"Fields of Gold"; Transliteration: "Ōgon no Sōgen" (Japanese: 黄金の草原)	Directed by : Tetsuya Endō; Storyboarded by : Masami Shimoda	Masashi Sogo	Shingo Fujisaki	September 6, 2014
199	24	"The Grand Banquet"; Transliteration: "Dai Buyō Enbu" (Japanese: 大舞踊演舞)	Directed by : Hiroshi Kimura; Storyboarded by : Teika Sasaki	Shōji Yonemura	Natsuko Suzuki & Masahiko Matsuo	September 13, 2014
200	25	"Droplets of Time"; Transliteration: "Seisō no Shizuku" (Japanese: 星霜の雫)	Directed by : Fumio Ito; Storyboarded by : Shinji Ishihira	Atsuhiro Tomioka	Etsushi Mori, Kenichi Watanabe & Eri Ishikawa	September 20, 2014
201	26	"A Gift"; Transliteration: "Okurimono" (Japanese: 贈り物)	Directed by : Akira Kato; Storyboarded by : Teika Sasaki	Fumihiko Shimo	Masahiko Inuzuka, Haruka Saneto, Takuro Sakurai & Mari Shirakawa	September 27, 2014
Grand Magic Games Arc (Standalone side stories)
202	27	"Welcome Back, Frosch"; Transliteration: "Okaeri, Furosshu" (Japanese: おかえり､ フロッシュ)	Directed by : Suzuki Yuji; Storyboarded by : Shinji Ishihira	Shōji Yonemura	Masanori Iizuka & Hatsue Nakayama	October 4, 2014
203	28	"Moulin Rouge"; Transliteration: "Mūran Rūju" (Japanese: ムーランルージュ)	Directed by : Teika Sasaki; Storyboarded by : Shinji Ishihira	Atsuhiro Tomioka	Shingo Fujisaki	October 11, 2014
Eclipse Celestial Spirits Arc
204	29	"Full Effort Hospitality!"; Transliteration: "Omotenashi, Inochi Kaketemasu!" (Japanese: おもてなし､ 命かけてます!)	Directed by : Mitsuto Yamaji; Storyboarded by : Masami Shimoda	Masashi Sogo	Eri Ishikawa, Minoru Okabe, Takuro; Sakurai, Mari Shirakawa & Yuka Takemori	October 18, 2014
205	30	"Signal of Rebellion"; Transliteration: "Hangyaku no Noroshi" (Japanese: 反逆の狼煙)	Directed by : Osamu Sekita; Storyboarded by : Shinji Ishihira	Fumihiko Shimo	Haruka Saneto, Etsushi Mori & Masahiko Inuzuka	October 25, 2014
206	31	"Library Panic"; Transliteration: "Panikku obu Raiburarī" (Japanese: パニック・オブ・ライブラリー)	Directed by : Kazunobu Shimizu; Storyboarded by : Shinji Ishihira	Masashi Sogo	Heo Gi Dong, Shoji Endo & Mikio Shiiba	November 1, 2014
207	32	"Hisui Rises!"; Transliteration: "Hisui Tatsu!" (Japanese: ヒスイ立つ!)	Directed by : Daiki Fukuoka; Storyboarded by : Ryōji Fujiwara	Shōji Yonemura	Masahiko Itoshima, Joji Yanase & Kenichi Watanabe	November 8, 2014
208	33	"Astral Spiritus"; Transliteration: "Asutoraru Supiritasu" (Japanese: アストラル・スピリタス)	Directed by : Matsuo Asami; Storyboarded by : Masami Shimoda	Atsuhiro Tomioka	Satomi Miyazaki & Tomoaki Kado	November 15, 2014
209	34	"Wendy vs. Aquarius – Let's Have Fun in the Amusement Park!"; Transliteration: "Wendi bāsasu Akueriasu, Yūenchi de Asobo!" (Japanese: ウェンディ vs. アクエリアス､ 遊園地であそぼ!)	Directed by : Teika Sasaki; Storyboarded by : Ryōji Fujiwara	Masashi Sogo	Shingo Fujisaki	November 22, 2014
210	35	"Guild Deck vs. Celestial Deck"; Transliteration: "Girudo Dekki bāsasu Seirei Dekki" (Japanese: ギルドデッキ vs. 星霊デッキ)	Directed by : Suzuki Yuji; Storyboarded by : Shinji Ishihira	Atsuhiro Tomioka	Takuro Sakurai, Yuka Takemori, Etsushi Mori & Mari Shirakawa	November 29, 2014
211	36	"Gray vs. Cancer! Dance Battle!"; Transliteration: "Gurei bāsasu Kyansā, Dansu Batoru!" (Japanese: グレイ vs. キャンサー､ ダンスバトル!)	Directed by : Osamu Sekita; Storyboarded by : Yasuhiro Tanabe	Shōji Yonemura	Masahiko Inuzuka, Haruka Saneto & Minoru Okabe	December 6, 2014
212	37	"Juvia vs. Aries! Desert Death Match!"; Transliteration: "Jubia bāsasu Ariesu, Sabaku no Shitō!" (Japanese: ジュビア vs. アリエス､ 砂漠の死闘!)	Directed by : Akira Kato; Storyboarded by : Ryōji Fujiwara	Fumihiko Shimo	Masahiko Itoshima, Isamu Fukushima & Kenichi Watanabe	December 13, 2014
213	38	"Erza vs. Sagittarius! Horseback Showdown!"; Transliteration: "Eruza bāsasu Sajitariusu, Bajō no Kessen!" (Japanese: エルザ vs. サジタリウス､ 馬上の決戦!)	Directed by : Kazunobu Shimizu; Storyboarded by : Takashi Ikehata	Fumihiko Shimo	Heo Gi Dong & Shoji Endo	December 20, 2014
214	39	"Natsu vs. Leo"; Transliteration: "Natsu bāsasu Reo" (Japanese: ナツ vs. レオ)	Directed by : Hiroshi Akiyama; Storyboarded by : Ryōji Fujiwara	Shōji Yonemura	Joji Yanase, Yuuki Morimoto & Yuji Shibata	December 27, 2014
215	40	"Ophiuchus, the Snake Charmer"; Transliteration: "Hebitsukaiza no Ofiukusu" (Japanese: 蛇遣い座のオフィウクス)	Directed by : Teika Sasaki; Storyboarded by : Yasuhiro Tanabe	Atsuhiro Tomioka	Shingo Fujisaki	January 10, 2015
216	41	"When the Stars Fall"; Transliteration: "Hoshi Michite Nagaruru Toki" (Japanese: 星満ちて流るる時)	Directed by : Yuji Suzuki; Storyboarded by : Jin Inai	Masashi Sogo	Takuro Sakurai, Mari Shirakawa, Etsushi Mori & Kenichi Watanabe	January 17, 2015
217	42	"Celestial Spirit Beast"; Transliteration: "Seireijū" (Japanese: 星霊獣)	Directed by : Osamu Sekita; Storyboarded by : Shinji Ishihira	Masashi Sogo	Masahiko Inuzuka, Misa Okabe & Haruka Fuji	January 24, 2015
218	43	"Believe"	Directed by : Hiroshi Kimura; Storyboarded by : Shinji Ishihira	Masashi Sogo	Tomoaki Kado & Yoko Takanori	January 31, 2015
Eclipse Celestial Spirits Arc (Standalone side stories)
219	44	"What a Pure Heart Weaves"; Transliteration: "Magokoro ga Tsumugu Mono" (Japanese: 真心が紡ぐもの)	Directed by : Hiroshi Akiyama; Storyboarded by : Ryōji Fujiwara	Shōji Yonemura	Yuki Morimoto, Hatsue Nakayama, Masahiko; Itoshima, Kenji Fukasawa & Yuka Takemori	February 7, 2015
220	45	"413 Days"	Directed by : Fumio Ito; Storyboarded by : Nobuhiro Kondo	Fumihiko Shimo	Hatsue Nakayama & Masanori Iizuka	February 14, 2015
221	46	"The Labyrinth of White"; Transliteration: "Hakugin no Meikyū" (Japanese: 白銀の迷宮)	Directed by : Teika Sasaki; Storyboarded by : Masami Shimoda	Fumihiko Shimo	Shingo Fujisaki	February 21, 2015
222	47	"Transform!"; Transliteration: "Henshin!" (Japanese: 変身!)	Directed by : Kazunobu Shimizu; Storyboarded by : Shinji Ishihira	Shōji Yonemura	Heo Gi Dong, Shoji Endo & Mikio Shiiba	February 28, 2015
223	48	"It's Kemo-Kemo!"; Transliteration: "Kemokemo ga Kita!" (Japanese: ケモケモが来た!)	Directed by : Hiroshi Kimura; Storyboarded by : Norihiro Takamoto	Masashi Sogo	Kazuyuki Iizai & Tomoaki Kado	March 7, 2015
224	49	"The Place You Came To"; Transliteration: "Kimi no Kita Basho" (Japanese: 君の来た場所)	Directed by : Akira Kato; Storyboarded by : Nobuhiro Kondo	Masashi Sogo	Haruka Saneto, Minoru Okabe & Masahiko Inuzuka	March 14, 2015
225	50	"Lightning Man"; Transliteration: "Ikazuchi no Otoko" (Japanese: いかづちの男)	Directed by : Yuji Suzuki; Storyboarded by : Yasuhiro Tanabe	Atsuhiro Tomioka	Etsushi Mori, Kenichi Watanabe & Yuji Shibata	March 21, 2015
226	51	"Fairy Tail of the Dead Meeeeeeeeen"	Directed by : Osamu Sekita; Storyboarded by : Shinji Ishihira	Atsuhiro Tomioka	See note for the ADs (Note: Masahiko Itoshima, Takuro Sakurai, Mari Shirakawa, Kazuzo Kobayashi, Hironori Hano & Hiroyuki Kamura)	March 28, 2015
Sun Valley Arc
227	52	"Morning of a New Adventure"; Transliteration: "Arata na Bōken no Asa" (Japanese: 新たな冒険の朝)	Directed by : Teika Sasaki; Storyboarded by : Shinji Ishihira	Masashi Sogo	Shingo Fujisaki	April 4, 2015
228	53	"Wizards vs. Hunters"; Transliteration: "Madōshi bāsasu Hantā" (Japanese: 魔導士 vs. ハンター)	Directed by : Yoshitaka Fujimoto; Storyboarded by : Takashi Ikehata	Shōji Yonemura	Watanabe Natsuki	April 11, 2015
229	54	"Art of Regression"; Transliteration: "Taika no Hō" (Japanese: 退化ノ法)	Directed by : Hiroshi Akiyama; Storyboarded by : Yasuhiro Tanabe	Fumihiko Shimo	Hatsue Nakayama, Isamu Fukushima, Yuki Morimoto & Keita Watanabe	April 18, 2015
230	55	"The Demon Returns"; Transliteration: "Akuma Kaiki" (Japanese: 悪魔回帰)	Directed by : Fumio Ito; Storyboarded by : Ryōji Fujiwara	Fumihiko Shimo	Minoru Okabe, Kenichi Watanabe, Haruka Saneto & Masahiko Inuzuka	April 25, 2015
231	56	"Gray vs. Doriate"; Transliteration: "Gurei bāsasu Doriāte" (Japanese: グレイ vs. ドリアーテ)	Directed by : Kazunobu Shimizu & Umeko Tsujimura; Storyboarded by : Takashi Ikehata	Atsuhiro Tomioka	Shoji Endo, In Bum Hwang & Mikio Shiiba	May 2, 2015
232	57	"Voice of the Flame"; Transliteration: "Honō no Koe" (Japanese: 炎の声)	Directed by : Yuji Suzuki; Storyboarded by : Akira Nishimori	Shōji Yonemura	Etsushi Mori, Yuji Shibata, Kenichi Watanabe & Yuka Takemori	May 9, 2015
233	58	"Song of the Fairies"	Directed by : Yoshitaka Fujimoto; Storyboarded by : Shinji Ishihira	Masashi Sogo	Natsuki Watanabe & Shun Yamaoka	May 16, 2015
Tartaros Arc (Prologue) (Note: Tarutarosu-hen (Joshō) (冥府の門(タルタロス)編【序章】))
234	59	"The Nine Demon Gates"; Transliteration: "Kyūkimon" (Japanese: 九鬼門)	Directed by : Hiroshi Akiyama; Storyboarded by : Shinji Ishihira	Masashi Sogo	Akihiko Sano, Yuuki Morimoto & Masahiko Itoshima	May 23, 2015
235	60	"Fairies vs. Netherworld"; Transliteration: "Yōsei bāsasu Meifu" (Japanese: 妖精 対 冥府)	Directed by : Teika Sasaki; Storyboarded by : Yasuhiro Tanabe	Atsuhiro Tomioka	Shingo Fujisaki	May 30, 2015
236	61	"The White Legacy"; Transliteration: "Shiroki Isan" (Japanese: 白き遺産)	Directed by : Akira Kato; Storyboarded by : Masami Shimoda	Fumihiko Shimo	Masahiko Inuzuka, Misa Okabe & Haruka Fuji	June 6, 2015
237	62	"Natsu vs. Jackal"; Transliteration: "Natsu bāsasu Jakkaru" (Japanese: ナツ vs. ジャッカル)	Directed by : Kazunobu Shimizu & Umeko Tsujimura; Storyboarded by : Akira Nishimori	Shōji Yonemura	Shoji Endo, In Bum Hwang & Mikio Shiiba	June 13, 2015
Tartaros Arc (Note: Tarutarosu-hen (冥府の門(タルタロス)編))
238	63	"Immorality and Sinners"; Transliteration: "Haitoku to Zainin" (Japanese: 背徳と罪人)	Directed by : Osamu Sekita; Storyboarded by : Shinji Ishihira	Masashi Sogo	Hatsue Nakayama, Takuro Sakurai, Mari; Shirakawa, Iseong Kim, Hyung Jun Heo	June 20, 2015
239	64	"Jellal vs. Oración Seis"; Transliteration: "Jerāru bāsasu Orashion Seisu" (Japanese: ジェラール vs. 六魔将軍(オラシオンセイス))	Directed by : Yuji Suzuki; Storyboarded by : Shinji Ishihira	Fumihiko Shimo	Etsushi Mori, Kenichi Watanabe & Yuji Shibata	June 27, 2015
240	65	"A Place Reached by Prayer"; Transliteration: "Inori ga Todoku Basho" (Japanese: 祈りが届く場所)	Directed by : Fumio Ito; Storyboarded by : Shinji Ishihira	Atsuhiro Tomioka	Masahiko Itoshima, Isamu Fukushima, Hatsue; Nakayama, Masanori Iizuka & Ken Itakura	July 4, 2015
241	66	"The Demon's Rebirth"; Transliteration: "Akuma Tensei" (Japanese: 悪魔転生)	Directed by : Teika Sasaki; Storyboarded by : Masami Shimoda	Shōji Yonemura	Shingo Fujisaki	July 11, 2015
242	67	"To Let Live or Die"; Transliteration: "Ikasu ka Korosu ka" (Japanese: 生かすか殺すか)	Directed by : Hiroshi Akiyama; Storyboarded by : Akira Nishimori	Atsuhiro Tomioka	Masahiko Inuzuka, Misa Okabe & Haruka Fuji	July 18, 2015
243	68	"Wendy vs. Ezel"; Transliteration: "Wendi bāsasu Ezeru" (Japanese: ウェンディ vs. エゼル)	Directed by : Akira Kato; Storyboarded by : Takashi Ikehata	Fumihiko Shimo	Mari Shirakawa, Takuro Sakurai, Ken; Itakura, Masanori Iizuka & Etsushi Mori	July 25, 2015
244	69	"Friends Forever"; Transliteration: "Zutto Tomodachi de" (Japanese: ずっと友達で)	Directed by : Kazunobu Shimizu & Ayaka Tsujihashi; Storyboarded by : Shinji Ishihira	Shōji Yonemura	Shoji Endo, In Bum Hwang & Mikio Shiiba	August 1, 2015
245	70	"Hell's Core"; Transliteration: "Heru'zu Koa" (Japanese: ヘルズ・コア)	Yoshitaka Fujimoto	Masashi Sogo	Watanabe Natsuki	August 8, 2015
246	71	"Underworld King"; Transliteration: "Mei-ō" (Japanese: 冥王)	Directed by : Yuji Suzuki; Storyboarded by : Shinji Ishihira	Masashi Sogo	Yi Sung Kim, Kenichi Watanabe & Yuji Shibata	August 15, 2015
247	72	"Alegria"; Transliteration: "Areguria" (Japanese: アレグリア)	Directed by : Yoshitaka Fujimoto; Storyboarded by : Akira Nishimori	Atsuhiro Tomioka	Shingo Fujisaki	August 22, 2015
248	73	"A Strike from the Stars"; Transliteration: "Hoshiboshi no Ichigeki" (Japanese: 星々の一撃)	Directed by : Osamu Sekita & Yuji Suzuki; Storyboarded by : Masami Shimoda	Shōji Yonemura	Masahiko Itoshima, Masanori Iizuka & Hatsue Nakayama	August 29, 2015
249	74	"Celestial Spirit King vs. Underworld King"; Transliteration: "Seirei-ō bāsasu Mei-ō" (Japanese: 星霊王 vs. 冥王)	Directed by : Mitsuto Yamaji; Storyboarded by : Shinji Ishihira	Fumihiko Shimo	Masahiko Inuzuka, Misa Okabe & Haruka Fuji	September 5, 2015
250	75	"Erza vs. Minerva"; Transliteration: "Eruza bāsasu Mineruba" (Japanese: エルザ vs. ミネルバ)	Directed by : Akira Kato; Storyboarded by : Shinji Ishihira	Shōji Yonemura	Yuuki Morimoto, Eri Ishikawa & Yuka Takemori	September 12, 2015
251	76	"The Boy's Tale"; Transliteration: "Shōnen no Monogatari" (Japanese: 少年の物語)	Directed by : Yoshitaka Fujimoto; Storyboarded by : Shinji Ishihira	Fumihiko Shimo	Shingo Fujisaki & Natsuki Watanabe	September 19, 2015
252	77	"Gray vs. Silver"; Transliteration: "Gurei bāsasu Shirubā" (Japanese: グレイ vs. シルバー)	Directed by : Fumio Ito; Storyboarded by : Shinji Ishihira	Masashi Sogo	Tsutomu Ohno, Masahiko Itoshima, Takuro Sakurai & Mari Shirakawa	September 26, 2015
253	78	"A Silver Wish"; Transliteration: "Gin'iro no Omoi" (Japanese: 銀色の想い)	Directed by : Kazunobu Shimizu & Ayaka Tsujihashi; Storyboarded by : Shinji Ishihira	Atsuhiro Tomioka	Shoji Endo, Mikio Shiiba & Ki Yeop Kim	October 3, 2015
254	79	"Air"	Directed by : Yoshitaka Fujimoto; Storyboarded by : Masami Shimoda	Fumihiko Shimo	Yusuke Isonai & Natsuki Watanabe	October 10, 2015
255	80	"Steel"; Transliteration: "Hagane" (Japanese: 鋼)	Directed by : Yuji Suzuki; Storyboarded by : Akira Nishimori	Masashi Sogo	Yuji Shibata, Kenichi Watanabe, Yuji Ushijima & Katsunori Kikuchi	October 17, 2015
256	81	"Final Duels"; Transliteration: "Saigo no Ikkiuchi" (Japanese: 最後の一騎討ち)	Directed by : Akira Kato; Storyboarded by : Yasuhiro Tanabe	Masashi Sogo	Masahiko Itoshima, Masahiko Inuzuka & Haruka Saneto	October 24, 2015
257	82	"Wings of Despair"; Transliteration: "Zetsubō no Tsubasa" (Japanese: 絶望の翼)	Yoshitaka Fujimoto	Atsuhiro Tomioka	Shingo Fujisaki	October 31, 2015
258	83	"Fire Dragon Iron Fist"; Transliteration: "Karyū no Tekken" (Japanese: 火竜の鉄拳)	Hiroshi Akiyama	Shōji Yonemura	Yuki Morimoto	November 7, 2015
259	84	"00:00"	Directed by : Yuji Suzuki; Storyboarded by : Akira Nishimori	Atsuhiro Tomioka	Minoru Okabe, Masahiko Itoshima, Eri Ishikawa & Yuka Takemori	November 14, 2015
260	85	"The Girl in the Crystal"; Transliteration: "Suishō no Naka no Shōjo" (Japanese: 水晶の中の少女)	Sōichi Shimada	Fumihiko Shimo	Momoko Nagakawa	November 21, 2015
261	86	"Absolute Demon"; Transliteration: "Zettai no Akuma" (Japanese: 絶対の悪魔)	Directed by : Yoshitaka Fujimoto; Storyboarded by : Shinji Ishihira	Masashi Sogo	Shingo Fujisaki	November 28, 2015
262	87	"Memento Mori" (Japanese: メメント・モリ)	Directed by : Kazunobu Shimizu & Ayaka Tsujihashi; Storyboarded by : Akira Nishimori	Shōji Yonemura	Shoji Endo, Mikio Shiiba & Ki Yeop Kim	December 5, 2015
263	88	"Soaring Above Ishgar"; Transliteration: "Ishugaru ni Mau" (Japanese: イシュガルに舞う)	Directed by : Yuji Suzuki; Storyboarded by : Masami Shimoda	Masashi Sogo	Yuji Shibata, Kenichi Watanabe, Takuro Sakurai & Masahiko Itoshima	December 12, 2015
264	89	"Drops of Fire"; Transliteration: "Honō no Shizuku" (Japanese: 炎の雫)	Directed by : Fumio Ito; Storyboarded by : Shinji Ishihira	Masashi Sogo	Masahiko Inuzuka, Haruka Saneto & Yukiko Musa	December 19, 2015
Tartaros Arc (Epilogue) (Note: Tarutarosu-hen (Shūshō) (冥府の門(タルタロス)編【終章】))
265	90	"Where the Power of Life Lies"; Transliteration: "Sore ga Ikiru Chikara da" (Japanese: それが生きる力だ)	Directed by : Yoshitaka Fujimoto; Storyboarded by : Shinji Ishihira	Masashi Sogo	Shingo Fujisaki	December 26, 2015
Fairy Tail Zero (Note: Stylized as FAIRY TAIL ZERØ)
266	91	"The Fairy in Your Heart"; Transliteration: "Kokoro no Naka no Yōsei" (Japanese: 心の中の妖精)	Directed by : Hiroshi Akiyama; Storyboarded by : Shinji Ishihira	Fumihiko Shimo	Masahiko Itoshima, Eri Ishikawa & Yuka Takemori	January 9, 2016
267	92	"The Adventure Begins"; Transliteration: "Bōken no Hajimari" (Japanese: 冒険の始まり)	Directed by : Akira Kato; Storyboarded by : Takashi Ikebata	Shōji Yonemura	Minoru Okabe, Takuro Sakurai, Mari Shirakawa & Young Sang Kwon	January 16, 2016
268	93	"Treasure Hunt"; Transliteration: "Torejā Hanto" (Japanese: トレジャーハント)	Directed by : Masato Sato; Storyboarded by : Masami Shimoda	Masashi Sogo	Kumiko Shishido	January 23, 2016
269	94	"Dancing with Blades"; Transliteration: "Yaiba to Odoru" (Japanese: 刃と踊る)	Yoshitaka Fujimoto	Atsuhiro Tomioka	Shingo Fujisaki	January 30, 2016
270	95	"Moonlit Lake"; Transliteration: "Tsukiakari no Mizuumi" (Japanese: 月明かりの湖)	Directed by : Kazunobu Shimizu & Ayaka Tsujihashi; Storyboarded by : Akira Nishimori	Fumihiko Shimo	Shoji Endo, Mikio Shiiba & Kim Kiyeod	February 6, 2016
271	96	"Blue Skull"; Transliteration: "Burū Sukaru" (Japanese: 青い髑髏(ブルースカル))	Directed by : Fumio Ito; Storyboarded by : Akira Nishimori	Shōji Yonemura	Masahiko Inuzuka, Haruka Saneto & Yukiko Musa	February 13, 2016
272	97	"Conveyer of Magic"; Transliteration: "Madō o Tsutaeru Mono" (Japanese: 魔道を伝える者)	Suzuki Yuji	Masashi Sogo	Kenichi Watanabe, Yuji Shibata & Masahiko Itoshima	February 20, 2016
273	98	"Treasure"; Transliteration: "Takaramono" (Japanese: 宝物)	Directed by : Yoshitaka Fujimoto; Storyboarded by : Takeshi Furuta	Atsuhiro Tomioka	Shingo Fujisaki & Natsuki Watanabe	February 27, 2016
274	99	"Law"; Transliteration: "Rō" (Japanese: ロウ)	Soichi Shimada	Atsuhiro Tomioka	Momoko Nagakawa	March 5, 2016
275	100	"Eternal Adventure"; Transliteration: "Eien no Bōken" (Japanese: 永遠の冒険)	Directed by : Hiroshi Akiyama & Ayaka Tsujihashi; Storyboarded by : Hiroshi Akiyama	Fumihiko Shimo	See note for the ADs (Note: Eri Ishikawa, Takuro Sakurai, Yuuki Morimoto, Mari Shirakawa, Masahiko Itoshima, Kiyoshi Matsushita & Kenichi Watanabe)	March 12, 2016
Avatar Arc (Prologue)
276	101	"Challenger"; Transliteration: "Chōsensha" (Japanese: 挑戦者)	Directed by : Yoshitaka Fujimoto; Storyboarded by : Akira Nishimori	Shōji Yonemura	Shingo Fujisaki	March 19, 2016
277	102	"Message of Flame"; Transliteration: "Honō no Messēji" (Japanese: 炎のメッセージ)	Shinji Ishihira	Masashi Sogo	Shinji Takeuchi, Akihiko Sano, Masahiko Inuzuka & Haruka Saneto	March 26, 2016

=== Season 3 (2018–19) ===
No. overall	No. in season	Title	Directed by	Written by	Chief animation directed by	Original release date
Avatar Arc
278	1	"The Lamia Scale Thanksgiving Festival"; Transliteration: "Ramia Sukeiru Kanshasai" (Japanese: 蛇姫の鱗(ラミアスケイル)感謝祭)	Directed by : Naoto Hashimoto; Storyboarded by : Shinji Ishihira	Masashi Sogo	Akihiko Sano	October 7, 2018
279	2	"Because of Love"; Transliteration: "Aishiteru kara" (Japanese: 愛してるから)	Yūshi Suzuki	Shōji Yonemura	Yūki Morimoto	October 14, 2018
280	3	"Avatar"; Transliteration: "Avatāru" (Japanese: 黒魔術教団(アヴァタール))	Ayaka Tsujihashi	Fumihiko Shimo	Hatsue Nakayama	October 21, 2018
281	4	"Underground Clash"; Transliteration: "Chika no Gekitō" (Japanese: 地下の激闘)	Directed by : Tomoya Takayama; Storyboarded by : Shinji Ishihira	Atsuhiro Tomioka	Akihiko Sano	October 28, 2018
282	5	"The Purification Plan"; Transliteration: "Jōka Sakusen" (Japanese: 浄化作戦)	Kazunobu Shimizu	Shōji Yonemura	Isamu Fukushima	November 4, 2018
283	6	"Ikusatsunagi" (Japanese: イクサツナギ)	Directed by : Akira Shimizu; Storyboarded by : Shinji Ishihira	Fumihiko Shimo	Hatsue Nakayama	November 11, 2018
284	7	"Memoirs"; Transliteration: "Kaisōroku" (Japanese: 回想録)	Directed by : Hiroshi Akiyama; Storyboarded by : Shinji Ishihira	Masashi Sogo	Yūki Morimoto	November 18, 2018
Alvarez Arc
285	8	"The 7th Guild Master"; Transliteration: "Nanadaime Girudo Masutā" (Japanese: 七代目ギルドマスター)	Directed by : Yūshi Suzuki; Storyboarded by : Shinji Ishihira	Atsuhiro Tomioka	Akihiko Sano	November 25, 2018
286	9	"Law of Space"; Transliteration: "Kūkan no Okite" (Japanese: 空間の掟)	Fumio Itō	Atsuhiro Tomioka	Isamu Fukushima	December 2, 2018
287	10	"Emperor Spriggan"; Transliteration: "Kōtei Supurigan" (Japanese: 皇帝スプリガン)	Directed by : Tomoya Takayama; Storyboarded by : Shinji Ishihira	Fumihiko Shimo	Hatsue Nakayama	December 9, 2018
288	11	"To the God-Forsaken Land"; Transliteration: "Kami ni Misuterareta Chi e" (Japanese: 神に見捨てられた地へ)	Ayaka Tsujihashi	Shōji Yonemura	Yūki Morimoto	December 16, 2018
289	12	"Mavis and Zeref"; Transliteration: "Meibisu to Zerefu" (Japanese: メイビスとゼレフ)	Directed by : Kazuki Yokouchi; Storyboarded by : Shinji Ishihira	Masashi Sogo	Akihiko Sano	December 23, 2018
290	13	"Fairy Heart"; Transliteration: "Fearī Hāto" (Japanese: 妖精の心臓(フェアリーハート))	Directed by : Fumio Itō; Storyboarded by : Shinji Ishihira	Masashi Sogo	Hatsue Nakayama	January 6, 2019
291	14	"The Magnolia Defensive War"; Transliteration: "Magunoria Hōeisen" (Japanese: マグノリア防衛戦)	Kazunobu Shimizu	Atsuhiro Tomioka	Isamu Fukushima	January 13, 2019
292	15	"Morning Star"; Transliteration: "Myōjō" (Japanese: 明星)	Directed by : Naoto Hashimoto; Storyboarded by : Akihiko Sano	Fumihiko Shimo	Akihiko Sano	January 20, 2019
293	16	"For Whom the Parfum Flows"; Transliteration: "Sono Parufamu wa Ta ga Tame ni" (Japanese: その香り(パルファム)は誰がために)	Directed by : Tomoya Takayama; Storyboarded by : Shinji Ishihira	Shōji Yonemura	Yūki Morimoto	January 27, 2019
294	17	"Natsu vs. Zeref"; Transliteration: "Natsu bāsasu Zerefu" (Japanese: ナツ vs. ゼレフ)	Yūshi Suzuki	Atsuhiro Tomioka	Hatsue Nakayama	February 3, 2019
295	18	"Across 400 Years"; Transliteration: "Yonhyaku-nen no Toki o Koe" (Japanese: 400年の時を超え)	Directed by : Hiroshi Akiyama; Storyboarded by : Shinji Ishihira	Shōji Yonemura	Yūki Morimoto	February 10, 2019
296	19	"What I Want to Do"; Transliteration: "Atashi no Shitai Koto" (Japanese: あたしのしたい事)	Fumio Itō	Fumihiko Shimo	Akihiko Sano	February 17, 2019
297	20	"Not Until the Battle Is Over"; Transliteration: "Tatakai ga Owaru made wa" (Japanese: 戦いが終わるまでは)	Directed by : Shinichi Fukumoto; Storyboarded by : Shinji Ishihira	Masashi Sogo	Isamu Fukushima	February 24, 2019
298	21	"In a Silent Time"; Transliteration: "Shizuka naru Toki no Naka de" (Japanese: 静かなる時の中で)	Ayaka Tsujihashi	Atsuhiro Tomioka	Hatsue Nakayama & Akihiko Sano	March 3, 2019
299	22	"Natsu, Revived!!"; Transliteration: "Fukkatsu no Natsu!!" (Japanese: 復活のナツ!!)	Kazunobu Shimizu	Shōji Yonemura	Yūki Morimoto	March 10, 2019
300	23	"Historia of Corpses"; Transliteration: "Shikabane no Hisutoria" (Japanese: 屍のヒストリア)	Directed by : Akira Shimizu; Storyboarded by : Shinji Ishihira	Masashi Sogo	Isamu Fukushima, Akihiko Sano & Hatsue Nakayama	March 17, 2019
301	24	"Mettle"; Transliteration: "Kihaku" (Japanese: 気魄)	Directed by : Tomoya Takayama; Storyboarded by : Shinji Ishihira	Fumihiko Shimo	Akihiko Sano	March 24, 2019
302	25	"The Third Seal"; Transliteration: "Dai San no In" (Japanese: 第三の印)	Yūshi Suzuki	Fumihiko Shimo	Hatsue Nakayama	March 31, 2019
303	26	"Together, Always"; Transliteration: "Zutto Futari de" (Japanese: ずっと二人で)	Directed by : Hiroshi Akiyama; Storyboarded by : Shinji Ishihira	Masashi Sogo	Yūki Morimoto	April 7, 2019
304	27	"Fairy Tail Zero"; Transliteration: "Fearī Teiru Zero" (Japanese: フェアリーテイル ZERO)	Directed by : Naoto Hashimoto; Storyboarded by : Shinji Ishihira	Shōji Yonemura	Isamu Fukushima	April 14, 2019
305	28	"White Dragneel"; Transliteration: "Shiroki Doraguniru" (Japanese: 白きドラグニル)	Tomoya Takayama	Atsuhiro Tomioka	Akihiko Sano	April 21, 2019
306	29	"The Winter Wizard"; Transliteration: "Fuyu no Madōshi" (Japanese: 冬の魔導士)	Fumio Itō	Atsuhiro Tomioka	Hatsue Nakayama	April 28, 2019
307	30	"Gray and Juvia"; Transliteration: "Gurei to Jubia" (Japanese: グレイとジュビア)	Directed by : Tomoe Makino; Storyboarded by : Shinji Ishihira	Masashi Sogo	Yūki Morimoto	May 5, 2019
308	31	"The Mightiest Demon of the Book of Zeref"; Transliteration: "Zerefu-sho Saikyō no Akuma" (Japanese: ゼレフ書最強の悪魔)	Directed by : Kazuki Yokouchi; Storyboarded by : Akihiko Sano	Shōji Yonemura	Isamu Fukushima	May 12, 2019
309	32	"Broken Bonds"; Transliteration: "Kowareta Kizuna o" (Japanese: 壊れた絆を)	Directed by : Tomoya Takayama; Storyboarded by : Shinji Ishihira	Fumihiko Shimo	Akihiko Sano	May 19, 2019
310	33	"Pleasure and Pain"; Transliteration: "Kairaku to Kutsū" (Japanese: 快楽と苦痛)	Ayaka Tsujihashi	Atsuhiro Tomioka	Hatsue Nakayama	May 26, 2019
311	34	"Natsu's Mind"; Transliteration: "Natsu no Kokoro" (Japanese: ナツノココロ)	Kazunobu Shimizu	Fumihiko Shimo	Isamu Fukushima	June 2, 2019
312	35	"Sting, the White Shadow Dragon"; Transliteration: "Hakueiryū no Sutingu" (Japanese: 白影竜のスティング)	Directed by : Shunichi Kato; Storyboarded by : Shinji Ishihira	Masashi Sogo	Yūki Morimoto	June 9, 2019
313	36	"Dragon Seed"; Transliteration: "Ryū no Tane" (Japanese: 竜の種)	Directed by : Tomoya Takayama; Storyboarded by : Shinji Ishihira	Shōji Yonemura	Akihiko Sano	June 16, 2019
314	37	"Master Enchant"; Transliteration: "Masutā Enchanto" (Japanese: 極限付加術(マスターエンチャント))	Yūshi Suzuki	Fumihiko Shimo	Hatsue Nakayama	June 23, 2019
315	38	"Dragon or Demon"; Transliteration: "Ryū ka Akuma ka" (Japanese: 竜か悪魔か)	Naoto Hashimoto	Shōji Yonemura	Isamu Fukushima	June 30, 2019
316	39	"Gray's Trump Card"; Transliteration: "Gurei no Kirifuda" (Japanese: グレイの切り札)	Directed by : Kayo Kamiya; Storyboarded by : Shinji Ishihira	Masashi Sogo	Yūki Morimoto	July 7, 2019
317	40	"Dark Future"; Transliteration: "Kuroi Mirai" (Japanese: 黒い未来)	Tomoya Takayama	Atsuhiro Tomioka	Akihiko Sano	July 14, 2019
318	41	"My Name Is..."; Transliteration: "Boku no Namae wa..." (Japanese: ぼくのなまえは...)	Directed by : Fumio Itō; Storyboarded by : Shinji Ishihira	Atsuhiro Tomioka	Hatsue Nakayama	July 21, 2019
319	42	"Compassion"; Transliteration: "Jō" (Japanese: 情)	Directed by : Naoto Hashimoto; Storyboarded by : Shinji Ishihira	Shōji Yonemura	Isamu Fukushima & Hatsue Nakayama	July 28, 2019
320	43	"Neo Eclipse"; Transliteration: "Neo Ekuripusu" (Japanese: ネオ・エクリプス)	Yūshi Suzuki	Fumihiko Shimo	Yūki Morimoto	August 4, 2019
321	44	"Blind to Love"; Transliteration: "Ai wa Mō Mienai" (Japanese: 愛はもう見えない)	Directed by : Tomoya Takayama; Storyboarded by : Shinji Ishihira	Masashi Sogo	Akihiko Sano	August 11, 2019
322	45	"The Door of Vows"; Transliteration: "Chikai no Tobira" (Japanese: 誓いの扉)	Directed by : Yūshi Suzuki; Storyboarded by : Shinji Ishihira	Shōji Yonemura	Hatsue Nakayama	August 18, 2019
323	46	"Raging Fire of the Dragon"; Transliteration: "Araburu Ryū no Honō" (Japanese: 荒ぶる竜の炎)	Directed by : Ayaka Tsujihashi; Storyboarded by : Yūya Takahashi	Masashi Sogo	Isamu Fukushima	August 25, 2019
324	47	"When the Fire Dies"; Transliteration: "Honō Kieru Toki" (Japanese: 炎消える時)	Directed by : Hiroshi Akiyama; Storyboarded by : Shinji Ishihira	Fumihiko Shimo	Yūki Morimoto	September 1, 2019
325	48	"World Destruction"; Transliteration: "Sekai Hōkai" (Japanese: 世界崩壊)	Tomoya Takayama	Atsuhiro Tomioka	Akihiko Sano	September 8, 2019
326	49	"Magic of Hope"; Transliteration: "Kibō no Mahō" (Japanese: 希望の魔法)	Directed by : Kazunobu Shimizu; Storyboarded by : Shinji Ishihira	Masashi Sogo	Hatsue Nakayama	September 15, 2019
327	50	"Hearts Connected"; Transliteration: "Tsunagaru Kokoro" (Japanese: 繋がる心)	Directed by : Yūshi Suzuki; Storyboarded by : Shinji Ishihira	Masashi Sogo	Isamu Fukushima	September 22, 2019
328	51	"Dearest Friends"; Transliteration: "Kakegae no Nai Nakama-tachi" (Japanese: かけがえのない仲間たち)	Directed by : Naoto Hashimoto; Storyboarded by : Shinji Ishihira	Masashi Sogo	Akihiko Sano	September 29, 2019

== OVAs ==
No.	Title	Original release date
1	"Welcome to Fairy Hills!!"; Transliteration: "Yōkoso, Fearī Hiruzu!!" (Japanese: ようこそ フェアリーヒルズ!!)	April 15, 2011
Lucy investigates a rewardless job posting that requests a female recipient to come to Fairy Hills, Fairy Tail's all-female dormitory. The client, dorm matron Hilda, asks Lucy to find a missing box on the premises; to Lucy's indignation, Hilda forces her to wear a skimpy cat costume while doing so. After receiving a tour of the building from Erza, Lucy finds the box hidden in a tree in the backyard. When she explains Hilda's request, Erza tells her that Hilda has been dead for six years. The box is revealed to contain jewels that Hilda, shortly before her death, promised Erza would receive from a "cat princess" (Lucy) once she became an adult. With Hilda's unfinished business complete, the job request fades away, as does the cat costume, leaving Lucy nude in public. Meanwhile, the male guild members discover a periscope designed to spy on women in the guild's swimming pool from underground. When they use it, they are horrified to see Makarov losing his bathing suit in the pool, causing them to unwittingly demolish the pool in a panic.
2	"Fairy Academy: Yankee-kun and Yankee-chan"; Transliteration: "Yōsei Gakuen: Yankī-kun to Yankī-chan" (Japanese: 妖精学園 ヤンキー君とヤンキーちゃん)	June 17, 2011
In an alternate setting, Lucy is a transfer student at Fairy Academy, where Fairy Tail's members are depicted as high school students, and Happy and the celestial spirits serve as teachers and staff. Erza, the student council president, asks Lucy and fellow transfer student Wendy to help her prepare for a date with Siegrain from Era Academy. En route to her date, the three are harassed by Gajeel and the Element 4 from the rival Phantom Academy. Erza savagely beats up the Phantom students, aided by delinquents Natsu and Gray, but she is spotted and dumped by a terrified Siegrain. Gajeel and his gang later retaliate against Fairy Academy in a school war; Erza, who is heartbroken over Siegrain, is unable to intervene when she meets the identical-looking Jellal and Mystogan. Afterwards, Erza cheers up and invites her friends to a karaoke bar. In response to the fight, school counselor Carla gathers the students to be lectured by their principal, Plue, who gives an unintelligible speech that only Carla and a chastened Natsu understand.
3	"Memory Days"; Transliteration: "Memorī Deizu" (Japanese: メモリーデイズ)	February 17, 2012
While cleaning the guild's storage, Natsu has a traumatic memory of an event in which he received the scar on his neck. This activates a magical book called Memory Days, which transports Natsu and his friends back six years in time to the day from Natsu's memory. Ignoring Erza's warnings to not interact with anything while she decodes the book for a way back to the present, Natsu and Gray go off exploring in disguises. While following them, Lucy stops a runaway carriage that carries her own younger self, who notices the emblem on her present self's hand and becomes inspired to join the guild. Meanwhile, Natsu and Gray spot their younger selves fighting before getting into a brawl themselves. When the younger Natsu loses to Gray, he is attacked by his bruised and unrecognizable present self, who inadvertently causes his own childhood trauma as the younger Natsu scratches his own neck while trying to fight back. Upon discovering that only Natsu will return to the present, his friends race to reach him in time and successfully return with him, creating a time loop as the book remains behind to be picked up and stored away by Makarov.
4	"Fairies' Training Camp"; Transliteration: "Yōsei-tachi no Gasshuku" (Japanese: 妖精たちの合宿)	November 16, 2012
Mavis's spirit leaves Sirius Island to visit Fairy Tail, watching as Natsu and his friends train for the Grand Magic Games. That evening, the girls drink all of the alcohol at their lodging and tease the mortified boys in a drunken state. Later, at the hot spring, Lucy tells the girls about how she first discovered Natsu and Happy's house. In a flashback, Lucy plans to play a prank on Natsu and Happy by waiting in their room as revenge for the many times they have appeared uninvited in her own home. She is initially disgusted by the filthiness of their house, but notices that they have taken special care of various memorabilia they have collected from all of their missions with her. Touched, Lucy tidies up their room while she waits for them. When they do not return, she becomes forlorn and returns home, only to find the two have fallen asleep in her bedroom while waiting for her. In the present, after the boys are caught trying to peep on the girls, Mavis decides to lend the guild her support for the tournament.
Movie–SP	"The First Morning"; Transliteration: "Hajimari no Asa" (Japanese: はじまりの朝)	February 15, 2013
The priestess Éclair sews together a stuffed bird doll that is inadvertently brought to life by the magic from her mystical Phoenix Stone. The doll, Momon, attempts to befriend Éclair, but Éclair despises him for being a creation of magic, calling him "Bird" out of contempt. She brings Momon to a nearby village where she works as a fortune-teller by looking into others' pasts and making up predictions. One of her customers is a young boy, Dist, who asks her in vain to revive his dead pet weasel. When told that he will also die someday, Dist tells Éclair his desire to live forever. That evening, Éclair returns home to find her missing Phoenix Stone, rebuffing Momon's warnings of wolves prowling about. She is attacked by a wolf pack, but Momon fends them off and guards her into the morning, gaining Éclair's friendship. Deciding to learn more about the stone, the two visit a city where they briefly cross paths with Lucy, Natsu, and Happy.
5	"The Exciting Ryuzetsu Land"; Transliteration: "Dokidoki Ryūzetsu Rando" (Japanese: ドキドキ・リュウゼツランド)	June 17, 2013
On the third night of the Grand Magic Games, Fairy Tail visits the popular water park Ryuzetsu Land to relax, meeting and playing with various other competitors from the tournament. However, Natsu inadvertently causes havoc when he crashes into a water slide, starting a chain of events that leads to Gray freezing the slide and Natsu attempting to shatter the ice, destroying the park as a result. Natsu and Gray are subsequently punished while Fairy Tail is left to pay for the damages.
6	"Fairy Tail x Rave"; Transliteration: "Fearī Teiru x Reivu" (Japanese: フェアリーテイル x レイヴ)	August 16, 2013
In a crossover with Rave Master, Natsu and his friends separately meet Haru Glory and his companions Elie, Plue, Musica, Let, Julia, and Griff. Natsu and Haru strike up an immediate friendship until Haru learns that Natsu is on a mission to capture someone at Ruby's casino who seemingly matches Elie's description. The two break into a destructive fight that is eventually broken up by Erza, the actual, unwitting target of Natsu's mission. The casino is suddenly attacked by a giant slot machine mech piloted by the living staff Kurodoa, who has obtained a Dark Bring that creates soldiers from coins. While their friends battle the soldiers, Natsu and Haru team up and defeat Kurodoa, gaining each other's respect. The two groups go their separate ways, fondly reminiscing the encounter.
7	"Fairies' Penalty Game"; Transliteration: "Yōsei-tachi no Batsu Gēmu" (Japanese: 妖精たちの罰ゲーム)	May 20, 2016
Makarov holds a tie-breaking contest to determine the victor of the Grand Magic Games between Fairy Tail's "Team A" (Natsu, Lucy, Gray, Erza, Wendy, and Elfman) and "Team B" (Gajeel, Juvia, Mirajane, Laxus, and Cana). Laxus beats Erza at rock-paper-scissors, and Team A is consequently forced to follow Team B's demands for the day. After Team A searches a swamp for a magic stone to power Team B's hot tub, each member is put through a different penalty: Laxus makes Natsu and Elfman run menial errands; Juvia feeds Gray with shaved ice and water from her body; Mirajane engages in sadomasochistic play with Erza; Gajeel uses Lucy as a backup dancer alongside Levy for a music routine; and Panther Lily forces Happy and Carla to carry him around the city. Wendy is terrified when she is paired with Cana, but is surprised when Cana brings her to an orphanage to spend time with children her age who admire her. At the end of the day, Wendy thanks Cana for her thoughtful "penalty" while the rest of Team A retaliates against Team B.
8	"Natsu vs. Mavis"; Transliteration: "Natsu bāsasu Meibisu" (Japanese: ナツ vs. メイビス)	November 17, 2016
Mavis joins the girls at Fairy Tail's bath house, unhappy that she cannot enjoy the qualities of a hot bath in her incorporeal form. Erza recruits Natsu to heat the bath water to extreme temperatures, successfully allowing Mavis to experience its warmth. Although Mavis is pleased with the bath, she appears to remain upset about something. Warrod visits the bath house with a job request to find a box Mavis buried under a tree 100 years ago. Natsu and his friends accept in the hope of cheering her up with the box's unknown contents. After uprooting every tree in Magnolia, the wizards find the box by digging up the underground tree Natsu's house is built around. Mavis appears and explains she is not upset about the box; rather, it is the hundred-year anniversary of her bidding farewell to her friend Zera. The wizards open the box to find a crude drawing of Mavis and the guild's founders, which is framed in Natsu's house, now perched atop the tall, unearthed tree.
9	"Fairies' Christmas"; Transliteration: "Yōsei-tachi no Kurisumasu" (Japanese: 妖精たちのクリスマス)	December 16, 2016
On Christmas Eve, the Fairy Tail wizards spend the day decorating Kardia Cathedral for the holiday. That evening, Lucy and her friends gather at her apartment for a Christmas party, where the girls once again get drunk and torment the boys. When all but Erza begin flirting with the boys, Erza enviously proposes they play the "guild master game" (a game identical to the king game), where a constantly victorious Erza orders her friends to carry out increasingly raunchy demands, much to their horror and embarrassment. Fed up with her bullying, Gray cheats and orders Erza to walk home in the nude; to his dismay, she takes the challenge seriously and leaves the party upon stripping. She finally sobers upon running into Jellal in the streets and becomes ashamed of her behavior. Jellal kindly gives Erza his coat and escorts her home.

== Home media release ==
=== Japanese ===
Pony Canyon (Region 2)
Volume		Episodes	Release date	Ref.
Season 1	1	1–4	29 January 2010	
Season 1	2	5–8	26 February 2010	
Season 1	3	9–12	17 March 2010	
Season 1	4	13–16	30 April 2010	
Season 1	5	17–20	28 May 2010	
Season 1	6	21–24	25 June 2010	
Season 1	7	25–28	30 July 2010	
Season 1	8	29–32	27 August 2010	
Season 1	9	33–36	6 October 2010	
Season 1	10	37–40	3 November 2010	
Season 1	11	41–44	1 December 2010	
Season 1	12	45–48	24 December 2010	
Season 1	13	49–52	2 February 2011	
Season 1	14	53–56	2 March 2011	
Season 1	15	57–60	27 April 2011	
Season 1	16	61–64	3 May 2011	
Season 1	17	65–68	1 June 2011	
Season 1	18	69–72	6 July 2011	
Season 1	19	73–76	3 August 2011	
Season 1	20	77–80	7 September 2011	
Season 1	21	81–84	5 October 2011	
Season 1	22	85–88	2 November 2011	
Season 1	23	89–92	7 December 2011	
Season 1	24	93–96	6 January 2012	
Season 1	25	97–100	1 February 2012	
Season 1	26	101–104	7 March 2012	
Season 1	27	105–108	4 April 2012	
Season 1	28	109–112	2 May 2012	
Season 1	29	113–116	6 June 2012	
Season 1	30	117–120	4 July 2012	
Season 1	31	121–124	1 August 2012	
Season 1	32	125–128	5 September 2012	
Season 1	33	129–132	27 October 2012	
Season 1	34	133–136	7 November 2012	
Season 1	35	137–140	5 December 2012	
Season 1	36	141–144	9 January 2013	
Season 1	37	145–148	7 February 2013	
Season 1	38	149–152	6 March 2013	
Season 1	39	153–156	3 April 2013	
Season 1	40	157–160	1 May 2013	
Season 1	41	161–164	5 June 2013	
Season 1	42	165–168	3 July 2013	
Season 1	43	169–172	7 August 2013	
Season 1	44	173–175	4 September 2013	
Season 2	Vol. 1	176–179	7 July 2014	
Season 2	Vol. 2	180–183	16 August 2014	
Season 2	Vol. 3	184–187	17 September 2014	
Season 2	Vol. 4	188–191	17 October 2014	
Season 2	Vol. 5	192–195	17 November 2014	
Season 2	Vol. 6	196–199	16 December 2014	
Season 2	Vol. 7	200–203	16 January 2015	
Season 2	Vol. 8	204–207	17 February 2015	
Season 2	Vol. 9	208–211	17 March 2015	
Season 2	Vol. 10	212–215	16 April 2015	
Season 2	Vol. 11	216–219	15 May 2015	
Season 2	Vol. 12	220–223	17 June 2015	
Season 2	Vol. 13	224–226	17 July 2015	
Collections	DVD Collection I	1–48	6 July 2011	
Collections	DVD Collection II	49–98	4 July 2012	
Collections	DVD Collection III	99–144	21 August 2013	

=== English ===
Funimation Entertainment
Volume		Episodes	Release date	Ref.
Season 1	Part 1	1–12	22 November 2011	
Season 1	Part 2	13–24	27 December 2011	
Season 1	Part 3	25–36	31 January 2012	
Season 1	Part 4	37–48	20 March 2012	
Season 1	Part 5	49–60	23 July 2013	
Season 1	Part 6	61–72	20 August 2013	
Season 1	Part 7	73–84	10 December 2013	
Season 1	Part 8	85–96	4 February 2014	
Season 1	Part 9	97–108	25 March 2014	
Season 1	Part 10	109–120	20 May 2014	
Season 1	Part 11	121–131	15 July 2014	
Season 1	Part 12	132–142	16 September 2014	
Season 1	Part 13	143–153	28 October 2014	
Season 1	Part 14	154–164	2 December 2014	
Season 1	Part 15	165–175	10 March 2015	
Season 2	Part 16	176–187	25 August 2015	
Season 2	Part 17	188–199	23 September 2015	
Season 2	Part 18	200–212	1 December 2015	
Season 2	Part 19	213–226	22 March 2016	
Season 2	Part 20	227–239	7 June 2016	
Season 2	Part 21	240–252	6 September 2016	
Season 2	Part 22	253–265	6 December 2016	
Season 2	Zero	266–277	6 March 2018	
Final Season	Part 23	278–290	4 August 2020	
Final Season	Part 24	291–303	6 October 2020	
Final Season	Part 25	304–316	22 December 2020	
Final Season	Part 26	317–328	23 February 2021	
Collections	Collection 1	1–24	30 April 2013	
Collections	Collection 2	25–48	23 July 2013	
Collections	Collection 3	49–72	6 January 2015	
Collections	Collection 4	73–96	2 June 2015	
Collections	Collection 5	97–120	3 November 2015	
Collections	Collection 6	121–142	17 January 2017	
Collections	Collection 7	143–164	28 March 2017	
Collections	Collection 8	165–187	6 June 2017	
Collections	Collection 9	188–212	15 August 2017	
Collections	Collection 10	213–239	24 October 2017	
Collections	Collection 11	240–265	13 February 2018	

Manga Entertainment (Parts 1–9) Funimation via Anime Limited (Part 10+) (Region B/2)
Volume		Episodes	Release date	Refs.
Standards	Part 1	1–12	5 March 2012	
Standards	Part 2	13–24	21 May 2012	
Standards	Part 3	25–36	16 July 2012	
Standards	Part 4	37–48	17 September 2012	
Standards	Part 5	49–60	2 December 2013	
Standards	Part 6	61–72	24 February 2014	
Standards	Part 7	73–84	28 April 2014	
Standards	Part 8	85–96	11 August 2014	
Standards	Part 9	97–108	23 February 2015	
Standards	Part 10	109–120	21 November 2016	
Standards	Part 11	121–131	5 December 2016	
Standards	Part 12	132–142	9 January 2017	
Standards	Part 13	143–153	3 April 2017	
Standards	Part 14	154–164	8 May 2017	
Standards	Part 15	165–175	5 June 2017	
Standards	Part 16	176–187	3 July 2017	
Standards	Part 17	188–199	28 August 2017	
Standards	Part 18	200–212	25 September 2017	
Standards	Part 19	213–226	30 October 2017	
Standards	Part 20	227–239	27 November 2017	
Standards	Part 21	240–252	18 December 2017	
Standards	Part 22	253–265	29 January 2018	
Collections	Collection 1	1–24	22 July 2013 (DVD); 10 March 2014 (Blu-ray)	
Collections	Collection 2	25–48	2 September 2013 (DVD); 2 June 2014 (Blu-ray)	
Collections	Collection 3	49–72	19 January 2015	
Collections	Collection 4	73–96	14 September 2015	

Madman Entertainment (Region B/4)
Volume		Episodes	Release date	Ref.
Collections	Collection 1	1–12	11 January 2012	
Collections	Collection 2	13–24	15 February 2012	
Collections	Collection 3	25–36	18 April 2012	
Collections	Collection 4	37–48	23 May 2012	
Collections	Collection 5	49–60	18 September 2013	
Collections	Collection 6	61–72	20 November 2013	
Collections	Collection 7	73–84	19 February 2014	
Collections	Collection 8	85–96	16 April 2014	
Collections	Collection 9	97–108	18 June 2014	
Collections	Collection 10	109–120	23 July 2014	
Collections	Collection 11	121–131	17 September 2014	
Collections	Collection 12	132–142	26 November 2014	
Collections	Collection 13	143–153	7 January 2015	
Collections	Collection 14	154–164	18 February 2015	
Collections	Collection 15	165–175	20 May 2015	
Collections	Collection 16	176–187	21 October 2015	
Collections	Collection 17	188–199	13 January 2016	
Collections	Collection 18	200–212	2 March 2016	
Collections	Collection 19	213–226	4 May 2016	
Collections	Collection 20	227–239	6 July 2016	
Collections	Collection 21	240–252	2 November 2016	
Collections	Collection 22	253–265	8 February 2017	
Collections	Zero	266–277	11 April 2018	
Guild Collections	Guild Collection 1	1–48	11 April 2018	
Guild Collections	Guild Collection 2	49–96	11 April 2018	
Guild Collections	Guild Collection 3	97–142	9 May 2018	
Guild Collections	Guild Collection 4	143–175	6 June 2018	
Guild Collections	Guild Collection 5	176–226	4 July 2018	
Guild Collections	Guild Collection 6	227–277	3 October 2018	
Complete Collections	Collection	1–277, Fairy Tail: Phoenix Priestess, Fairy Tail: Dragon Cry	3 October 2018	

== See also ==
- List of Fairy Tail: 100 Years Quest episodes
