= List of Fairy Tail: 100 Years Quest episodes =

Fairy Tail: 100 Years Quest is an anime series based on the manga of the same name. It is a sequel to Fairy Tail by Hiro Mashima, storyboarded by Mashima and illustrated by Atsuo Ueda. It is animated by J.C.Staff and aired on TV Tokyo from July 7, 2024, to January 5, 2025. The episodes are directed by Toshinori Watanabe, with series composition by Atsuhiro Tomioka and music by Yasuharu Takanashi.

The first opening theme song is "Story" performed by Da-ice, while the first ending theme song is "Tomo yo, Koko de Sayonara da" (友よ ここでサヨナラだ; lit. 'My Friend, We Say Our Farewells Here') performed by Boku ga Mitekatta Aozora. The second opening theme song is "Endless Happy-Ending" by The Rampage from Exile Tribe, while the second ending theme song is "Ties" by Emi Noda.

Crunchyroll streamed the series outside of Asia. Muse Communication licensed the series in Southeast Asia.

== Episodes ==
No.	Title	Directed by	Written by	Storyboarded by	Original release date
1	"The "First" Guild and the "Strongest" Guild"; Transliteration: ""Saisho" no Girudo to "Saikyō" no Girudo" (Japanese: "最初"のギルドと"最強"のギルド)	Toshinori Watanabe	Atsuhiro Tomioka	Shinji Ishihira	July 7, 2024
A girl named Touka joins the Fairy Tail wizard guild to pursue her affections for Natsu Dragneel, who is away with his team on the 100 Years Quest, a mission that has remained unfinished by any guild for over a century. Juvia Lockser competes with Touka over her own love for Gray Fullbuster, leading them to bicker over various women who have shown interest in Natsu and Gray. When Touka mentions Briar, a member of the black magic cult Avatar whose name and admiration of Gray were never publicized, Gajeel Redfox becomes suspicious of Touka and rallies Juvia and Panther Lily to investigate her. Meanwhile, Natsu's team arrives on the continent of Guiltina to meet their client, the dragon Elefseria, a formerly human Dragon Slayer and founder of the world's first wizard guild, Magia Dragon. Elefseria reveals that the quest involves sealing the Five God Dragons, a group of surviving dragons that are each as powerful as Acnologia. He sends the team to the port town of Ermina, where the Water God Dragon, Mercphobia, is worshiped. The team's arrival is witnessed by a horned man whose companion addresses him as the Water God.
2	"The Sea of Dragons"; Transliteration: "Ryū no Umi" (Japanese: 竜の海)	Taichi Aratashi & Mio Hidenin	Masashi Sogo	Toshinori Watanabe	July 14, 2024
Ermina is submerged by the sea's high tide at night, with its citizens transforming into fish and providing Natsu's team with a potion that allows them to breathe underwater. When Gray asks about Mercphobia, the citizens assume them to be after Mercphobia's life and turn hostile. Disguising themselves as fish using the power of Lucy Heartfilia's celestial spirit Gemini, the team discovers a caged Dragon Eater woman, Kiria, whom the citizens plan to sacrifice for coming to consume Mercphobia and gain his powers. Kiria uses Blade Dragon Slayer magic to escape and kill a sea serpent she believes to be Mercphobia. Learning the serpent is actually Mercphobia's messenger, she vents her frustration by attacking Natsu's team, joined by her armored guildmate Madmole from the Dragon Eater guild Diabolos, until the humanoid Mercphobia intervenes. Meanwhile, Gajeel's group spies on Touka while facing disapproval from Levy McGarden; the group is shocked when Touka briefly sports a furry tail. Elsewhere, Jellal Fernandes conducts his own investigation of Touka, whom he considers to be dangerous.
3	"Blade, Armor, Ash"; Transliteration: "Yaiba, Yoroi, Hai" (Japanese: 刃、鎧、灰)	Toshinori Watanabe	Masashi Sogo	Toshinori Watanabe	July 21, 2024
Kiria and Madmole are teleported away by their guildmate Skullion Raider, a Dragon Eater who manipulates ash. Mercphobia is hospitable towards Natsu's team, explaining that he has renounced his past cruelty after bonding with his human companion, Karameel. However, he wishes to die due to his gradual loss of control over Ermina's tide—a result of having his magic stolen by the White Wizard, a witch rumored to be as dangerous as Zeref, the Black Wizard—and requests Natsu's team to recover his power and kill him before he floods the world. Overhearing this, Skullion changes Diabolos's target to the White Wizard and injures Mercphobia, deeming him worthless. Natsu's team fights to protect Mercphobia, but they are defeated by the Diabolos trio: Erza Scarlet turns submissive after Kiria magically "cuts" her strength; Natsu succumbs to motion sickness, to which Dragon Eaters are immune, after Madmole forces him onto Diabolos's ship; and Gray is seemingly disintegrated by Skullion. Meanwhile, Jellal learns of Touka's membership in Fairy Tail from Kagura Mikazuchi and confronts Touka, whom he identifies as the White Wizard.
4	"Dyed White"; Transliteration: "Shiroku Somaru" (Japanese: 白く染まる)	Kiyotaka Takezawa & Mio Hidenin	Atsuhiro Tomioka	Toshinori Watanabe	July 28, 2024
Jellal accuses Touka of stealing several wizards' magic as the founder of Rebellious, a white magic cult that aims to erase all magic from the world. Laxus Dreyar defends Touka and threatens Jellal into withdrawing, but warns Touka against keeping secrets that could endanger Fairy Tail. Touka later attempts to steal Jellal's magic for his interference, but stops herself before Gajeel apprehends her, revealing Touka and the White Wizard to be separate personalities. Meanwhile, Diabolos takes Natsu, Erza, and Wendy Marvell captive aboard their ship, leaving Lucy, Happy, and Carla behind. After Karameel sends them away on a boat, Lucy's group happens upon Brandish μ, who has saved Gray with her size-altering magic and is competing with Lucy in search of Aquarius's missing key. Brandish refuses to join the fight against Diabolos, but helps Fairy Tail by turning an undersea rock into an islet that beaches Diabolos's ship. Around this time, Kiria's spell wears off on Erza, who releases Natsu and Wendy. Natsu's group has a rematch with Diabolos, with Natsu using his Fire Dragon Slayer magic's heat to bypass Madmole's indestructible armor and defeat him.
5	"A Bitter Choice"; Transliteration: "Kujū no Ketsudan" (Japanese: 苦渋の決断)	Yoshiyuki Nogami & Momo Shimizu	Masashi Sogo	Kiyotaka Ōhata	August 4, 2024
Diabolos is outmatched by Fairy Tail and retreats, promising to retaliate with more members. Natsu's team returns to Ermina, where they witness Mercphobia mindlessly attacking the town in his dragon form. Karameel admits responsibility for the theft of Mercphobia's power, confessing she had contacted the White Wizard in a misguided effort to save him from being hunted, which has allowed the White Wizard to take control of him. Natsu's team reluctantly agrees to kill Mercphobia, who demonstrates his godlike power by raising the sea into the sky. Meanwhile, Jellal and the rest of Fairy Tail interrogate Touka, who explains that she is possessed by the White Wizard and joined Fairy Tail in the hopes of being separated from her with Wendy's enchantment magic. However, the White Wizard reasserts control and steals everyone's magic.
6	"Lineage of Fire"; Transliteration: "Honō no Keifu" (Japanese: 炎の系譜)	Toshinori Watanabe	Atsuhiro Tomioka	Toshinori Watanabe	August 11, 2024
"Troubled Lucy" (おなやみルーシィ, Onayami Rūshii) – Lucy experiences writer's block with a novel about gigantic anteaters. To inspire her, Natsu brings her on a mission that coincidentally matches her premise. There Lucy finds inspiration and hurriedly writes her ideas down while ensnared by anteater tongues. Natsu reaches Mercphobia's head to land a killing blow, but Mercphobia's water form extinguishes his fire magic. Mercphobia conjures a whirlpool in the sky to drown Natsu, but Natsu is saved by the sudden arrival of Ignia, the Fire Dragon God. Ignia reveals that Mercphobia is only at less than half his true strength and offers to temporarily bestow his own power onto Natsu through his own flames, which he spreads across Ermina to force Natsu to eat them. Before leaving, Ignia reveals himself to be the biological son of Natsu's adoptive father, Igneel, and challenges Natsu to a future one-on-one battle, expressing displeasure at his current level of power. Natsu begrudgingly eats Ignia's flames and attains a new, savage form that allows him to evaporate Mercphobia's water attacks and defeat him. However, Natsu enters a berserk state and attempts to incinerate Mercphobia's body before Lucy holds him back, returning Natsu to his normal form with no memory of his rampage.
7	"All's Well That Ends Well"; Transliteration: "Kekka Ōrai" (Japanese: 結果オーライ)	Taichi Atarashi	Masashi Sogo	Mio Hidenin	August 18, 2024
The people of Ermina begin rebuilding from the destruction caused by Mercphobia, who has recovered without any of his magic, leaving him stuck in human form and successfully sealed as per the 100 Years Quest's specifications. Grateful to live among Ermina's citizens in peace, Mercphobia provides information about the other Dragon Gods and directs Natsu's team to the city of Drasil to investigate Aldoron, the Wood Dragon God and the world's largest dragon. Natsu's team waits for a train to Drasil in the city of Tekka, where Erza is mistaken for a local celebrity named Elkis, who looks identical to her. Elkis approaches the team and, to explain the situation, brings them to a building labeled "Fairy Nail". Meanwhile, Skullion's team reports their encounter with Fairy Tail to Diabolos's master, Georg Reizen, while Saber Tooth's members visit Fairy Tail and find its members missing, with the White Wizard sailing to Guiltina in pursuit of Natsu's team.
8	"Aldoron, the Wood Dragon God"; Transliteration: "Mokushinryū Arudoron" (Japanese: 木神竜アルドロン)	Kunpei Maeda	Atsuhiro Tomioka	Kiyotaka Ōhata	August 25, 2024
Elkis gives Natsu's team a tour of Fairy Nail, a talent guild whose members all resemble those of Fairy Tail. Gray talks with Juvia's look-alike, Juvina, who recognizes Gray's unspoken love for Juvia and takes him on a mock date, inspiring him to overcome his insecurity about starting a relationship with Juvia. On the final train to Drasil, the team immediately meets Juvia, who is unusually hesitant to answer when asked about the other Fairy Tail members. When Gray questions Juvia about it, she suddenly realizes she cannot remember, but recalls the White Wizard and warns the team about her before losing consciousness. A tremor suddenly shakes Drasil, revealing the town to be built atop Aldoron's right hand, with four other towns situated across the sleeping dragon's left hand, back and shoulders. While the team gathers information, a hooded old man brings them to one of the White Wizard's churches, where he reveals himself as their guildmate Mirajane Strauss in disguise. Other hooded figures in the church unveil themselves as the rest of Fairy Tail's members and Jellal, all of whom have been brainwashed by the White Wizard.
9	"Whiteout"; Transliteration: "Howaitoauto" (Japanese: 白滅(ホワイトアウト))	Hiroaki Takagi	Masashi Sogo	Hiroaki Takagi	September 1, 2024
Wendy's magic protects Natsu's team from falling under the influence of Whiteout, the spell used by the White Wizard to control wizards through their magic. After the team escapes, the White Wizard uses Fairy Tail to destroy a magic orb enshrined on Aldoron's right hand, explaining that destroying four other orbs across Aldoron's body will weaken him and make him vulnerable to Whiteout. Touka relays the White Wizard's speech to Natsu's team through Juvia, the only wizard Touka has managed to free from her brainwashing. The team devises a plan to defeat their friends, which would allow Wendy to lift the spell on them. Gray, Natsu, and Lucy each encounter the Raijin Tribe, Gajeel, and the Strauss siblings, respectively, with Lucy using her recently learned Star Dress Mix spell to combine her Leo and Virgo Star Dress forms.
10	"New Foes"; Transliteration: "Arata naru Shikaku-tachi" (Japanese: 新たなる刺客たち)	Yoshihiro Mori	Masashi Sogo	Shinji Ishihira	September 8, 2024
"Uneasy Erza" (もやもやエルザ, Moyamoya Eruza) – Juvia uses a mirror to practice kissing Gray and encourages Erza to try the same for Jellal. Erza hesitantly does so with her reflection in a café window, but is seen by Jellal from outside, embarrassing her. "Tattered Gajeel" (ぼろぼろガジル, Boroboro Gajiru) – Levy finds Gajeel asleep on their living room floor. Initially angry with him, she softens when she notices he is covered in scars from the jobs he has taken to raise money for their unborn baby. Later, Lily comes in and sees Levy tenderly sleeping on the floor beside Gajeel. Lucy defeats Lisanna while Gray defeats the Raijin Tribe with his Devil Slayer form. Levy protects Gajeel from Natsu, who hesitates to attack the pregnant Levy, allowing her send Natsu away on a horse-drawn carriage. In the shrine on Aldoron's right shoulder, Wendy is captured by Nebaru, a spider-like Dragon Eater from Diabolos, whose members are also targeting the orbs so they may eat Aldoron. In the left hand shrine, Erza reluctantly engages in foreplay with a half-naked Jellal before being confronted by Laxus and Kiria. Meanwhile, Natsu's carriage is stopped by Wraith, a Diabolos member and ghost who is impervious to physical harm and perceived only by Dragon Slayers.
11	"Wraith, the Spirit Dragon"; Transliteration: "Reiryū no Reisu" (Japanese: 霊竜のレイス)	Taichi Atarashi	Atsuhiro Tomioka	Shinji Ishihira	September 15, 2024
Wraith uses his Spirit Dragon Slayer magic to remove Natsu's soul from his body. During a near-death experience, Natsu reunites with the souls of Zeref, Mavis Vermillion, their children August and Larcade, and Igneel, all of whom are living contentedly in Natsu's personalized afterlife. With their guidance, Natsu transforms his soul into a thought projection that is capable of injuring Wraith. After failing to dissuade Natsu from attacking by possessing Happy, Wraith flees and possesses Makarov Dreyar, whose immense magical power magnifies his own. Meanwhile, Erza attempts to take the orb while Laxus and Kiria are distracted in battle, but is captured and whisked away by Jellal, while Lucy retreats to find her guildmate Cana Alberona after Skullion and Madmole engage Mirajane and Elfman.
12	"A Card in the Hand"; Transliteration: "Hangeki no Kirifuda" (Japanese: 反撃の切り札)	Yoshiyuki Nogami	Masashi Sogo	Shinji Ishihira	September 22, 2024
On Aldoron's right shoulder, Wendy battles Nebaru while encased in a cocoon. Amused by Wendy, Nebaru decides against eating her and destroys the second orb. On the left hand, Erza tricks Jellal into releasing her and detains him before returning to the shrine, where Laxus defeats Kiria. On the right hand, Wraith suspects Makarov to be a blood relative due to their highly synchronous magic power. When Makarov's body proves physically unfit to withstand Natsu's attacks, Wraith recalls his forgotten past as a Fairy Tail wizard who was friends with Makarov before his death. Satisfied, Wraith surrenders to Natsu and passes on. Meanwhile, Lucy regroups with Gray and Juvia and takes the drunken Cana's magic cards, with which she intends to conveniently seal their defeated friends. The sealing spell backfires on Lucy, but a sober Cana releases her, revealing herself to have been unaffected by the White Wizard's magic due to her inebriation. After Natsu returns to his body, he and Happy travel to Aldoron's back, where they find Touka unconscious. Regaining control of herself, Touka awakens and begs Natsu for help.
13	"Scarlet Showdown"; Transliteration: "Kurenai no Gekitō" (Japanese: 紅の激闘)	Kiyotaka Takezawa	Atsuhiro Tomioka	Toshinori Watanabe	September 29, 2024
Touka lovingly embraces Happy, whom she believes to be named Natsu due to a misunderstanding from when the pair rescued her from bandits one year earlier. After learning her mistake, Touka reveals her true form as an Exceed similar to Happy, having been forced into the human White Wizard's form. Meanwhile, Erza and Laxus duel to a stalemate and pass out from exhaustion, after which Kiria destroys the third orb. Sensing this, the White Wizard takes control of Touka again and attempts to brainwash Natsu into destroying the nearby fourth orb. Deducing that the White Wizard cannot touch the orbs herself, Happy throws the orb at her, which encases her in wood and allows him and Natsu to escape.
14	"Clinging Dragon Berserk"; Transliteration: "Bōgyaku no Nenryū" (Japanese: 暴虐の粘竜)	Hiroaki Takagi	Atsuhiro Tomioka	Hiroaki Takagi	October 13, 2024
Skullion orders Diabolos to retreat following Kiria and Wraith's defeats, allowing Lucy's team to capture the fatigued Mirajane and Elfman. Nebaru defiantly continues to battle Wendy and enters his forbidden Dragon Force form, which accelerates his transformation into a dragon, forcing Skullion to abandon him. After suffering a brutal assault from Nebaru, Wendy enchants herself with Irene Belserion's residual magic power left from when the two had switched bodies. As an unforeseen side effect, the spell awakens a copy of Irene's personality that she had embedded within Wendy upon dying. Irene uses the last of her magic to restore Nebaru's human form by extracting his magic power with a separation enchantment, which she teaches to Wendy to separate Touka and the White Wizard. Natsu and Happy inform Wendy and Carla of Touka's identity, but Carla does not recognize Touka's name among the Exceeds from Edolas, all of whom have been accounted for since arriving in Earth Land. Meanwhile, the brainwashed Mest Gryder quickly destroys the final two orbs, awakening Aldoron.
15	"The Howling Earth"; Transliteration: "Todoroku Daichi" (Japanese: 轟く大地)	Yoshiyuki Nogami	Masashi Sogo	Toshinori Watanabe	October 20, 2024
"Jiggly Wendy" (ぷるぷるウェンディ, Purupuru Wendi) – Wendy fearfully complains about a bug inside her dormitory room. Carla and later Erza attempt to dispose of the bug, but are aggravated when it keeps evading them. It escalates to Erza demolishing parts of the entire building to kill the bug, unaware as it flies outside. The citizens of Drasil are willingly absorbed into Aldoron, revealing that the orbs' destruction has unsealed Aldoron's power instead of weakening him. Meanwhile, the White Wizard suddenly loses her magic, freeing the brainwashed wizards from Whiteout. The White Wizard realizes she has been deceived about the orbs by Selene, the Moon Dragon God, before Wendy separates her and Touka. After Aldoron withstands attacks from Guiltina's Magic Council and Natsu, the wizards' presence summons Wolfen, a humanoid tree and extension of Aldoron called a God Seed, who is tasked with killing those unabsorbed by the dragon. The telepathic Wolfen and his clones mimic the forms and magic of powerful figures from the wizards' memories, prompting Lucy's group to release their captured guildmates to battle them. After Natsu's confusing thought process causes one Wolfen to change into Happy, Natsu is inspired to defeat Aldoron by coaxing another Wolfen into assuming Zeref's form.
16	"God Seeds"; Transliteration: "Goddo Shīdo" (Japanese: ゴッドシード)	Tsuneo Tominaga	Masashi Sogo	Shinji Ishihira & Toshinori Watanabe	October 27, 2024
"Tired Touka" (へとへとトウカ, Hetoheto Tōka) – Shortly after casting Whiteout on Fairy Tail and Jellal, the White Wizard realizes she has no idea how to transport them to Guiltina. After frustrating herself with loading each member onto a cart individually, she realizes she could have brainwashed Elfman into helping her from the beginning. The Wolfen mimicking Zeref is afflicted with Zeref's curse of contradiction, which begins killing Aldoron through Wolfen's desire to protect him, forcing Wolfen to erase himself and his copies. Wolfen is replaced by three other God Seeds: Metro, who attacks Lucy's group with an army of wood golems; Gears, who battles Jellal; and Doom, who encounters Wendy's group. Meanwhile, Natsu is dragged inside Aldoron's body by a fifth God Seed embodying Aldoron's brain, whose attacks are faster than Natsu can see. With Wendy's magic power nearly depleted, Carla battles Doom in her place but is covered by his life-draining spores. Wendy and Happy are rescued by a group of Fairy Tail's weaker members, who are ineffectual against Doom. Wendy enchants the group with her remaining magic, strengthening them enough to destroy Doom and save Carla's life. Aldoron is weakened by Doom's death, allowing Natsu to detect and avoid his next attack.
17	"Strength to Live"; Transliteration: "Ikiru Chikara" (Japanese: 生きる力)	Toshinori Watanabe	Atsuhiro Tomioka	Toshinori Watanabe	November 3, 2024
"Brandish Walking Around" (うろうろブランディッシュ, Urouro Burandisshu) – Prior to Aldoron's awakening, Brandish tours Drasil after an unsuccessful search for Aquarius's key in the town, taking no interest in Fairy Tail's distant battling or the townspeople's disappearance as they unfold. Metro absorbs Juvia's water body into himself and uses her magic against Gray. Gray refuses to attack Metro while Juvia is fused with him, declaring that she gives him the strength to live. A flustered Juvia begins to boil Metro, which inspires Gray to transform her into ice and use her against Metro until she melts, releasing her. Gray and Juvia then perform a Unison Raid that freezes Metro to death, vanquishing his golems. The rest of Gray and Juvia's group encounters Brandish, who cannot shrink Aldoron and offers to enlarge Gajeel to the dragon's size to battle him. Meanwhile, Gears casts magic circles on Jellal that hinder his thought process, paralyzing him and causing him to hallucinate Erza attacking him in Gears' place. Ultear Milkovich manifests herself within his mind and encourages him to live for Erza's sake. Jellal overcomes Gears' spell by passing it onto Siegrain, his thought projection duplicate, and uses his Grand Chariot spell to destroy Gears.
18	"Burning Will"; Transliteration: "Moyuru Ishi" (Japanese: 燃ゆる意志)	Toshinori Watanabe	Atsuhiro Tomioka	Toshinori Watanabe	November 10, 2024
Aldoron's weakened God Seed attempts to kill Natsu, but is distracted by the gigantic Gajeel's attack on his main body before Brandish's spell wears off, exhausting Aldoron and further weakening his God Seed. Using the powers of the fire dragons whose flames he has consumed, Natsu burns through Aldoron's flame-resistant spells and destroys the God Seed, killing Aldoron. Georg learns of Aldoron's death and decides to send Suzaku, one of Diabolos's elite Dark Dragon Slayer Knights, to hunt Selene. Fairy Tail and their allies travel to the nearby city of Dramil, where they spend the next three days celebrating their reunion while Touka and the White Wizard remain comatose.
19	"Aqua Aera"; Transliteration: "Akua Ēra" (Japanese: 水の翼(アクアエーラ))	Yoshiyuki Nogami	Masashi Sogo	Shinji Ishihira	November 17, 2024
Brandish playfully shrinks Fairy Tail's female members in Dramil's public bath, but wanders off without returning them to normal size. As Lucy has Brandish's undo the spell, the White Wizard and Touka awaken; repentant, the White Wizard explains that her true intention is to save her and Touka's home, the parallel world of Elentear. When Touka hesitates to help her, the White Wizard impulsively uses Aqua Aera, Touka's interdimensional travel magic, to send herself and Natsu's team to Elentear. The botched spell instead brings them to Edolas, where they are incapable of using magic. The team reunites with Fairy Tail's Edolas counterparts, learning that over the past nine years, Natsu and Lucy's counterparts have married and had a daughter, Nasha, while Gray and Juvia's counterparts have a son, Greige. Not knowing of the White Wizard's involvement or how to leave Edolas, Natsu's team consults Mystogan, who has since become Edolas's king with his army captain Erza Knightwalker now acting as his maid. Mystogan speculates that the one who sent the team to Edolas has the same power as Selene, a denizen of Elentear who can freely travel between dimensions.
20	"Selene, the Moon Dragon God"; Transliteration: "Gesshinryū Serēne" (Japanese: 月神竜セレーネ)	Tsuneo Tominaga	Masashi Sogo	Shinji Ishihira	November 24, 2024
Touka locates Natsu's team through her Aqua Aera and informs them of the White Wizard's intent to save Elentear, which suffers from a critical overabundance of magic. Knightwalker provides Touka with the kingdom's last X-Ball to restore her ability to send the team home, while Edolas's Fairy Tail locates the White Wizard for them. The chastened White Wizard reveals her true identity as Faris, a shrine maiden responsible for keeping Elentear's magic in remission; she further explains that Selene has been threatening her into hunting the other Dragon Gods, forcing her to possess Touka and travel to Earthland, where she took the real White Wizard's identity and was indoctrinated by Rebellious. Selene suddenly appears, boasting that her manipulations were for her own amusement, as she has already decided to destroy Elentear. Selene sends the group to a cloud over Elentear, where a giant hand emerges from the ocean below and scatters the group to different locations across the world.
21	"The Moonlight Divinities"; Transliteration: "Gekka Bijin" (Japanese: 月下美神)	Yūsuke Onoda	Atsuhiro Tomioka & Masashi Sogo	Shinji Ishihira	December 1, 2024
Natsu's team is confronted by the Moonlight Divinities, a trio of Selene's bodyguards: Yoko, a summoner of yōkai; Hakune, who manipulates snow and ice; and Mimi, who possesses superhuman strength. Although the wizards' magic is enhanced in Elentear, the Moonlight Divinities defeat them with their mastery of spirit arts, a power separate from magic and curses. Unsatisfied with the wizards' defeat, Selene has them imprisoned in her domain of Blackmoon Mountain to serve as entertainment. After being humiliated by Selene's entourage, Natsu and Gray are transported to the caves below the mountain to battle hordes of yōkai, including Lucy, Wendy, Happy, and Carla, whom Yoko has brainwashed and transformed into a nure-onna, bakeneko, and two suiko, respectively. Aquarius summons herself to intervene during Natsu and Lucy's battle, taking advantage of Lucy's ability to summon spirits without her keys in Elentear.
22	"The Demons' Parade"; Transliteration: "Hyakki Yakō" (Japanese: 百鬼夜行)	Yoshiyuki Nogami	Atsuhiro Tomioka	Yoshiyuki Nogami	December 8, 2024
Aquarius restores Lucy's memories and violently spanks her, returning her to human form and temporarily reuniting the pair. She then tricks Wendy into using healing magic on herself by forcing her to drink water and pretending it is poisonous, undoing Wendy's transformation and allowing her to restore Happy, Carla, and the spider woman Erza. Yoko is dispatched by Selene to battle Fairy Tail personally, overwhelming them with her infinite yōkai horde until Erza defeats her, which dispels the monsters; during the battle, Natsu chases a yōkai wearing his scarf, leading him out of Blackmoon Mountain. Meanwhile, Faris brings Touka to her home, the Whiteout Village, which has been attacked by monsters spawned from the giant hands. They also meet Suzaku, whom the village's chief shrine maiden has summoned to Elentear to kill Selene, and who, as a member of Diabolos, harbors animosity for Fairy Tail. Suzaku travels to the foot of Blackmoon Mountain, where he encounters Natsu.
23	"Sword Saint"; Transliteration: "Kensei" (Japanese: 剣聖)	Toshinori Watanabe	Masashi Sogo	Toshinori Watanabe	December 15, 2024
"Sloppy, Soppy Juvia" (べたべたジュビア, Betabeta Jubia) – During their previous meeting, Juvia prepares to see Gray off until he is abruptly teleported to Edolas, sending Juvia into depression. Unaware of each other's guilds, Suzaku agrees to work with Natsu until he recognizes his arriving teammates as Fairy Tail members based on Diabolos's description. Suzaku swiftly defeats Natsu and Erza before Selene arrives with Hakune and Mimi to duel Suzaku herself, soon recognizing the name of Kurunugi, the dragon Suzaku devoured to gain his swordfighting abilities. Meanwhile, Touka helps Natsu's team escape to the Whiteout Village through her Aqua Aera portal, but Hakune and Mimi quickly catch up to them. Emboldened by her reunion with Aquarius, Lucy battles Mimi with her full potential, eventually exhausting herself after casting her ultimate spell, Urano Metria. Although Mimi continues to stand after being hit by the spell, Lucy notices it has left Mimi unconscious, making Lucy the victor.
24	"This Hideous World"; Transliteration: "Minikuki Sekai" (Japanese: 醜き世界)	Toshinori Watanabe & Yoshiyuki Nogami	Masashi Sogo	Shinji Ishihira	December 22, 2024
Gray battles Hakune, using his Devil Slayer form to withstand her freezing arts. In response, Hakune traps Gray in a deadly snowstorm that forces him to dream of living happily with Juvia, Greige, and his lost loved ones. Gray rejects the dream, declaring his true priority to be Juvia's happiness, and defeats Hakune with an army of ice giants. Elentear soon approaches its destruction, with giant hands erupting from the land. After Natsu and Erza awaken, Touka sends the team to Blackmoon Mountain to defeat Selene, whom they believe is manipulating the hands. Before they can arrive, Suzaku defeats her himself using a technique separate from those used by Kurunugi, one of Selene's sons, whom she learns Georg is responsible for killing. Selene flees Elentear through Aqua Aera with Suzaku in pursuit, but the hands continue to rampage without her. Investigating the hands, Wendy realizes they are connected to an underground body similar to the Face bombs from Earthland. Lucy and her spirit Virgo help the team burrow underground to battle the hands' body, Alta Face, a monster that has been provoked by Selene's actions into destroying Elentear.
25	"Homecoming"; Transliteration: "Kikan" (Japanese: 帰還)	Toshinori Watanabe	Atsuhiro Tomioka	Shinji Ishihira	January 5, 2025
The team's magic is overclocked by Alta Face's magic power, rendering their spells ineffective. With Irene's guidance, Wendy helps the team surpass their limits and destroy Alta Face, allowing the Whiteout shrine maidens to erase the overflowing magic. In the ensuing celebration, Faris insists on being punished for her actions as the White Wizard, but the team forgives her instead. Touka sends the team back to Earthland, where they reunite with their guildmates while Erza offers Jellal to join Fairy Tail, which he considers. Meanwhile, Selene is taken captive by Diabolos, but immediately breaks free and kills Georg to avenge Kurunugi, revealing herself to have restrained her true power when battling Suzaku. Taking Georg's place as Diabolos's master, Selene reveals her plan to rid the world of all other dragons in favor of humans, and commands the guild to kill Elefseria as a test of their power. Natsu's team also sets out to visit Elefseria for information on the remaining Dragon Gods.

=== Recap special ===
No.	Title	Directed by	Original release date
13.5	"Going Off Topic: Lucy's Diary"; Transliteration: "Kanwa: Rūshiizu Daiarī" (Japanese: 閑話・Lucy's diary)	Makoto Takahashi	October 6, 2024
A recap special covering the first thirteen episodes

== See also ==
- List of Fairy Tail episodes
